= Bethel Village, Indiana =

- Unincorporated community Census designated place
- Bartholomew County's location in Indiana

- Location in Bartholomew County
- Coordinates: 39°09′05″N 85°55′31″W
- Country: United States
- State: Indiana
- County: Bartholomew
- Township: Wayne
- Elevation: 610 ft (190 m)
- Time zone: UTC-5 (Eastern (EST))
  - Summer (DST): UTC-4 (EDT)
- ZIP code: 47201
- Area codes: 812 & 930
- GNIS feature ID: 2830309

Bethel Village is an unincorporated community and census designated place (CDP) in Wayne Township, Bartholomew County, in the U.S. state of Indiana.

== History ==
In 1890, the population was 124 residents. It was 142 in 1900, and was 85 in 1930.

== Demographics ==
The United States Census Bureau delineated Bethel Village as a census designated place in the 2022 American Community Survey.
