= Mid-March 2025 North American blizzard =

Blizzard and tornado outbreak in the Midwest

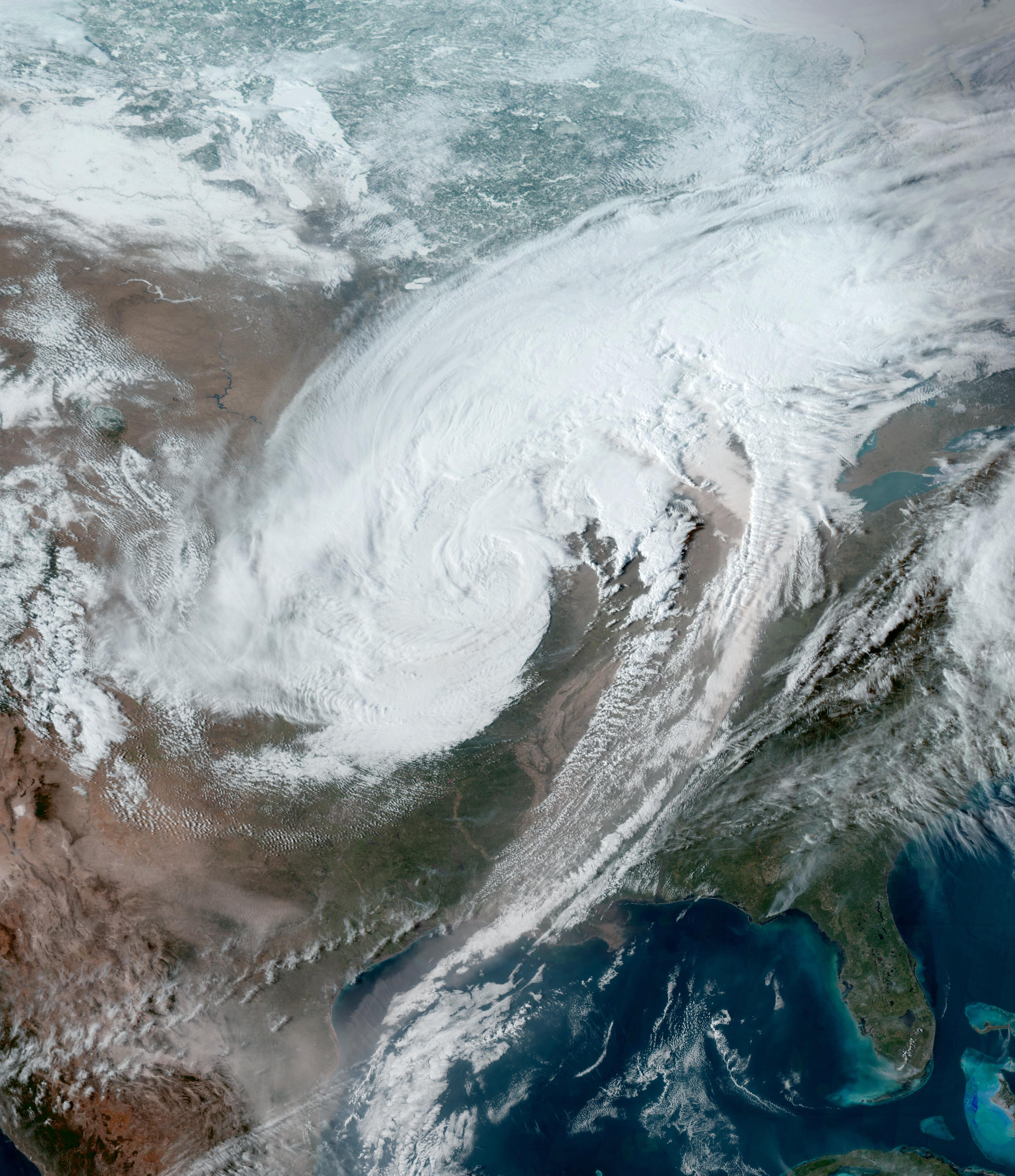
- Satellite image of the blizzard over the Midwest on March 19

Meteorological history
- Formed: March 17, 2025
- Dissipated: March 21, 2025

Blizzard
- Lowest pressure: 984 hPa (mbar); 29.06 inHg
- Max. snowfall: 26.77 in (68.0 cm), near Mammoth Lakes, California

Tornado outbreak
- Tornadoes: 15
- Max. rating: EF2 tornado
- Duration: March 19, 2025
- Highest winds: Tornadic – 112 mph (180 km/h) (Bartholomew County, Indiana EF2 on March 19)
- Largest hail: 1.25 inches (3.2 cm) in Ames, Iowa

Overall effects
- Power outages: >250,000
- Part of the 2024–25 North American winter

A strong winter storm, nicknamed Winter Storm Nyla by The Weather Channel, produced significant impacts across the United States. Notably, a strong blizzard occurred over the High Plains and Midwest, where winter weather and blizzard warnings were issued. Thunderstorm development created the risk for severe weather and tornadoes, especially in northern Illinois and Indiana, spawning 15 tornadoes on March 19.

== Meteorological history ==
Map plotting the storm's track and intensity, according to the Saffir–Simpson scale Map key Saffir–Simpson scale Tropical depression (≤38 mph, ≤62 km/h) Tropical storm (39–73 mph, 63–118 km/h) Category 1 (74–95 mph, 119–153 km/h) Category 2 (96–110 mph, 154–177 km/h) Category 3 (111–129 mph, 178–208 km/h) Category 4 (130–156 mph, 209–251 km/h) Category 5 (≥157 mph, ≥252 km/h) Unknown Storm type Tropical cyclone Subtropical cyclone Extratropical cyclone, remnant low, tropical disturbance, or monsoon depression

On March 17, the NWS forecasted that a relatively strong upper-level trough would move into California by the afternoon, with updrafts strong enough and instability high enough to produce lightning and small hail. That day, lightning, snow, and hail up to an inch in diameter were reported across northern California. The trough passed through California and the Great Basin area throughout the afternoon of the 18th, placing the system over the Midwest by the late evening. Moisture was present in the air, but due to limited atmospheric instability, the primary threat would be potentially severe hail centered over Iowa in the overnight and morning hours. On the morning of the 19th, large amounts of up to quarter-sized hail fell across parts of Iowa. Additionally, large amounts of snow fell in a relatively narrow band stretching from Kansas to Wisconsin. Coupled with high winds, whiteout conditions were created in some of these areas. Thundersnow was reported in these areas.

By the afternoon of the 19th, atmospheric destabilization occurred ahead of a cold front and dry line, allowing for widespread thunderstorm development over central Illinois. High winds brought by the system allowed for supercell development, although their strength was limited due to relatively low instability and moisture in the air following a larger outbreak days earlier. However, the environment remained volatile and tornadoes, potentially strong, remained a possibility throughout the afternoon. 15 tornadoes were confirmed, including three that passed through Gary, Indiana and one EF2 tornado, the strongest of the outbreak. The strongest of the Gary tornadoes, rated EF1, caused an injury when a roof collapsed on a woman.

An intense dirty rain event was caused by the system; dust, as well as wildfire smoke, was lofted into the atmosphere by the system, which fell as rain over a large region. Dirty rain was reported in Chicago, Illinois, Des Moines, Iowa, Nashville, Tennessee, and Toledo, Ohio.

== Impact ==
Blizzard conditions and downed power lines from strong winds forced parts Interstate 70 and Interstate 80 to shut down. Dust transported from northern Mexico and Texas caused poor air quality as far away as Iowa. Over 250,000 people across the country have been left without power due to the storm.

At least 38 wildfires have broken out across Arkansas, causing the obstruction or closure of many roads.

Three tornadoes struck Gary, Indiana on March 19. Damage was sustained to the McCullough Academy, a public school, as a tornado sheared its roof and damaged several classrooms and the gymnasium. Another tornado injured a woman after her roof collapsed. A shelter was established at the Monroe Center for those displaced by the tornadoes.

== Confirmed tornadoes ==
Confirmed tornadoes by Enhanced Fujita rating
EFU	EF0	EF1	EF2	EF3	EF4	EF5	Total
1	9	4	1	0	0	0	15

=== March 19 event ===
List of confirmed tornadoes – Wednesday, March 19, 2025 (Note: All dates are based on the local time zone where the tornado touched down; however, all times are in Coordinated Universal Time for consistency.)
EF#	Location	County / Parish	State	Start Coord.	Time (UTC)	Path length	Max width
EFU	ESE of Banner	Tazewell	IL	40.5°N 89.85°W	19:49–19:50	0.67 mi (1.08 km)	30 yd (27 m)
EFU	A video of this brief tornado was recorded but no damage was found.						
EF1	N of Rardin	Coles	IL	39.608°N 88.11°W	21:52–21:54	0.72 mi (1.16 km)	50 yd (46 m)
EF1	A farm outbuilding was destroyed and siding was torn from a house.						
EF0	Southeastern Joliet	Will	IL	41.4895°N 88.0604°W	22:00–22:01	0.25 mi (0.40 km)	90 yd (82 m)
EF0	This brief tornado caused shingle damage to a home, uprooted trees, and tossed metal panels and parts of a carport over 200 yd (180 m). One vehicle was also blown over before the tornado dissipated.						
EF0	Eastern New Lenox	Will	IL	41.4984°N 87.9488°W	22:10–22:21	1.53 mi (2.46 km)	60 yd (55 m)
EF0	A weak tornado caused damage to shingles, trees, and fencing.						
EF0	Eastern Frankfort	Will	IL	41.487°N 87.7943°W	22:18–22:19	0.33 mi (0.53 km)	75 yd (69 m)
EF0	This brief tornado moved through a residential area near a forest preserve, breaking branches and uprooting a few small trees before dissipating.						
EF1	Steger	Will	IL	41.4624°N 87.6528°W	22:28–22:30	1.62 mi (2.61 km)	90 yd (82 m)
EF1	This tornado moved east-northeast through residential and commercial areas, causing shingle damage to multiple homes and removing part of a metal warehouse roof with debris scattered across nearby railroad tracks. Damage elsewhere included broken branches and minor tree damage before the tornado dissipated.						
EF0	Lynwood	Cook	IL	41.5167°N 87.5632°W	22:35–22:36	0.29 mi (0.47 km)	50 yd (46 m)
EF0	This brief tornado damaged the roofs of two industrial buildings and scattered debris across the area before lifting shortly after crossing a roadway.						
EF0	Highland	Lake	IN	41.539°N 87.473°W	22:43–22:45	1.85 mi (2.98 km)	50 yd (46 m)
EF0	This high-end EF0 tornado touched down near a commercial area, damaging a roof before moving through residential neighborhoods where it broke branches, damaged shingles, and uprooted a few trees. One large tree fell onto a home, causing roof damage, and fences were also affected. The tornado weakened as it continued northeast, with lighter tree damage before dissipating.						
EF0	Black Oak	Lake	IN	41.5654°N 87.4123°W	22:46–22:47	0.44 mi (0.71 km)	50 yd (46 m)
EF0	This tornado struck the Gary neighborhood of Black Oak. Two large trees were uprooted and the glass doors of a casino were blown out.						
EF1	Tolleston	Lake	IN	41.5775°N 87.3902°W	22:47–22:48	0.71 mi (1.14 km)	50 yd (46 m)
EF1	This high-end EF1 tornado occurred in the Gary neighborhood of Tolleston caused significant damage, ripping the roof off a school gymnasium, damaging several homes, and bending power poles and light fixtures. One person was injured when part of a roof collapsed.						
EF0	Downtown Gary	Lake	IN	41.5897°N 87.3515°W	22:50–22:52	1.83 mi (2.95 km)	50 yd (46 m)
EF0	This brief tornado moved through Downtown Gary, uprooting several small trees and scattering tree debris across roadways near Norton Park and east of the business district. It weakened and dissipated before reaching US 12.						
EF0	S of Logansport	Cass	IN	40.7213°N 86.3559°W	23:54–23:55	0.89 mi (1.43 km)	50 yd (46 m)
EF0	A weak tornado caused minor shingle and fence damage between two homes, bent a TV tower, and later uprooted or snapped about twenty shallow-rooted trees in a wooded area before lifting in an open field.						
EF0	NE of Macy to SSW of Akron	Miami, Fulton	IN	40.99°N 86.08°W	00:20–00:23	2.7 mi (4.3 km)	100 yd (91 m)
EF0	This high-end EF0 tornado touched down in a wooded area, flipping an outbuilding and scattering debris. It reached peak intensity near a barn that sustained extensive damage, with roofing and siding materials thrown across fields. The tornado continued northeast, flipping sections of an irrigation system and causing tree damage before dissipating.						
EF2	W of Rosstown to S of Newbern	Bartholomew	IN	39.1056°N 85.946°W	00:44–00:57	13.55 mi (21.81 km)	350 yd (320 m)
EF2	This low-end EF2 tornado began near I-65 and tracked northeast to near Hartsville, producing mostly weak damage. The tornado reached peak intensity upon collapsing metal farm buildings and lofting debris up to half a mile. Along its path, several utility poles were broken and small metal transmission towers were twisted before the tornado dissipated.						
EF1	Southern Hebron to WSW of Villa Hills	Boone	KY	39.0426°N 84.7044°W	02:54–02:56	3.15 mi (5.07 km)	90 yd (82 m)
EF1	This tornado touched down at an industrial site in the far southern part of Hebron, west of KY 237, partially removing a roof and uprooting trees. Moving east-northeastward, the tornado struck Cincinnati/Northern Kentucky International Airport where it caused extensive wall and roof damage to a building, shifted a Boeing 747 five feet, and damaged a dozen cars from flying debris. The tornado also damaged HVAC systems and more trees before lifting.						

== See also ==
- Weather of 2025
- Tornadoes of 2025
  - List of United States tornadoes from January to March 2025
