= Petersville =

Petersville may refer to:

== Company ==
- Petersville (company)

== Places ==
=== Australia ===
- Petersville, South Australia, a locality in the Yorke Peninsula Council

=== Canada ===
- Petersville Parish, New Brunswick

=== United States ===
- Petersville, Alaska
- Petersville, Indiana
- Petersville, Iowa
- Petersville, Maryland, a historic village in southwestern Frederick County
- Petersville, Wisconsin, a ghost town

== See also ==
- Peterville, Prince Edward Island, Canada
