= Rachel Quick Buttz =

American memoirist and poet

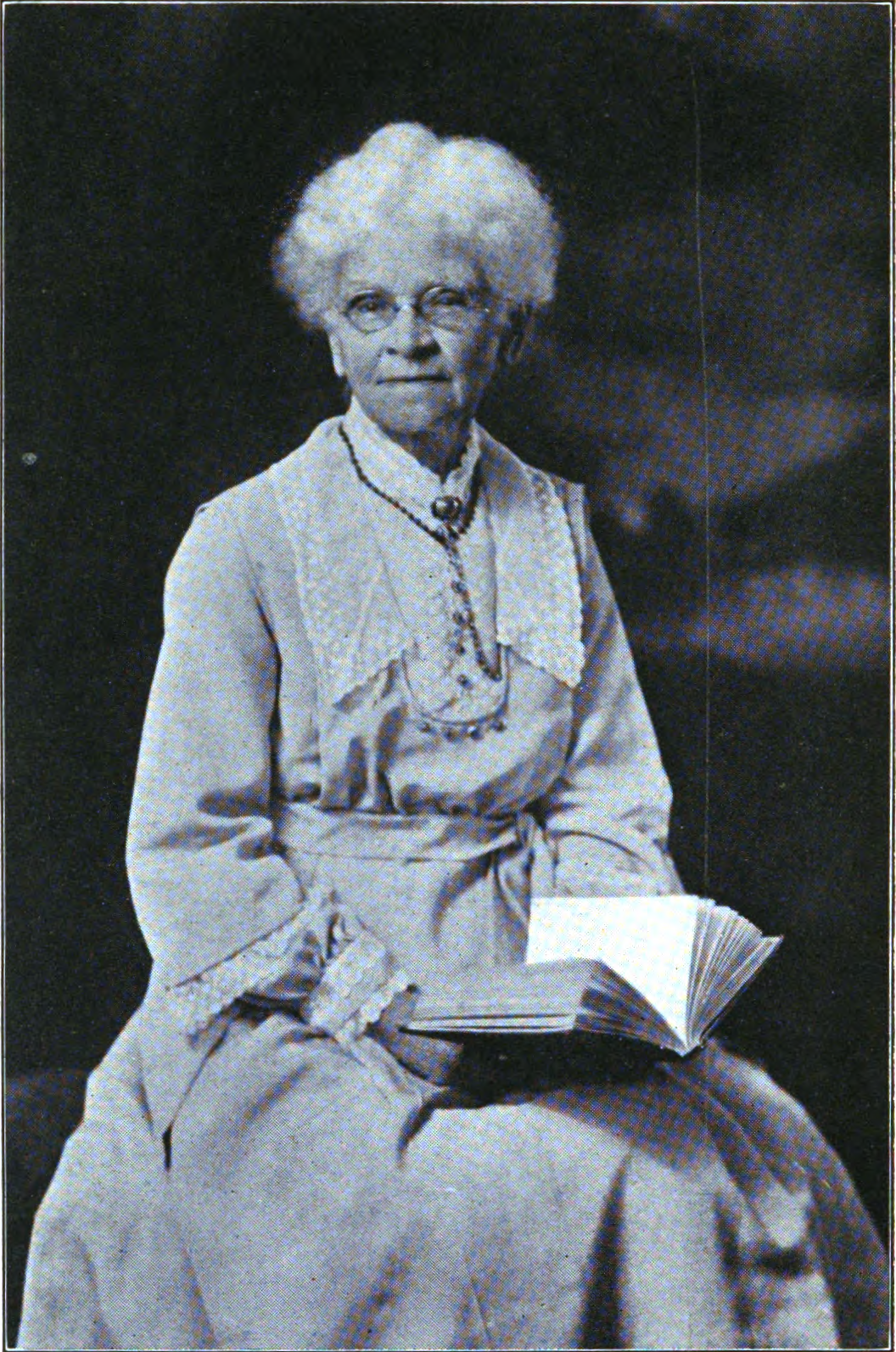
- Born: October 14, 1847; Bartholomew County
- Died: September 6, 1923 (aged 75); Bartholomew County
- Occupation: Writer
- Spouse(s): Samuel Buttz
- Parent(s): Tunis Quick

Rachel Nelson Quick Buttz (October 14, 1847 – September 6, 1923) was an American memoirist and poet.

She was born Rachel Nelson Quick near Columbus, Indiana on October 14, 1847, the daughter of Tunis Quick, a judge and state legislator, and Susannah Record Quick. She graduated from North-Western Christian University (now Butler University) in 1871, which was one of the earliest coeducational colleges in the United States. She married Samuel Buttz.

Buttz published two books. Blades and Blossoms (1911) was a collection of poetry. A Hoosier Girlhood (1924) was a memoir of her childhood that she wrote for her daughter Mabel.

Rachel Quick Buttz died on September 6, 1923, aged 75, in Bartholomew County, Indiana.

== Bibliography ==
- Blades and Blossoms. Boston, 1911.
- A Hoosier Girlhood. Boston, 1924.
