= Harrison Township, Bartholomew County, Indiana =

Harrison Township
- Township
- Location in Bartholomew County
- Coordinates: 39°11′20″N 86°01′42″W
- Country: United States
- State: Indiana
- County: Bartholomew

Government
  - Type: Indiana township

Area
  - Total: 23.73 sq mi (61.5 km^{2})
  - Land: 23.38 sq mi (60.6 km^{2})
  - Water: 0.35 sq mi (0.91 km^{2}) 1.47%
- Elevation: 751 ft (229 m)

Population (2020)
  - Total: 4,169
  - Density: 163.5/sq mi (63.1/km^{2})
- ZIP codes: 47201, 47448
- GNIS feature ID: 0453377

Harrison Township is one of twelve townships in Bartholomew County, Indiana, United States. As of the 2010 census, its population was 3,823 and it contained 1,528 housing units.

== Geography ==
According to the 2010 census, the township has a total area of 23.73 square miles (61.5 km^{2}), of which 23.38 square miles (60.6 km^{2}) (or 98.53%) is land and 0.35 square miles (0.91 km^{2}) (or 1.47%) is water. Camp Atterbury borders the township to the north.

=== Cities, towns, villages ===
- Columbus (west edge)

=== Unincorporated towns ===
- Bethany
- Stony Lonesome

(This list is based on USGS data and may include former settlements.)

=== Adjacent townships ===
- Columbus Township (east)
- Wayne Township (southeast)
- Ohio Township (south)
- Van Buren Township, Brown County (southwest)
- Washington Township, Brown County (west)

=== Cemeteries ===
The township cemeteries are Haislup and Lawton. Most of these have illegible grave markers and maintenance of the sites are the responsibility of the township trustee.

=== Major highways ===
- Indiana State Road 46

=== Lakes ===
- Lawsons Lake
- North Harrison Lake
- South Harrison Lake
- Tamerix Lake
- Youth Park Lake

== Services ==
Harrison Township provides many of its own services or contracts them out. Residents have either Southwest Water Company supply water or have local wells. Electricity is provided by Duke, cable television by Comcast, and high-speed cable Internet access by Comcast.

Fire protection is provided by the Harrison Township Volunteer Fire Department (HTVFCO). EMS by Columbus Regional Hospital (CRH) Ambulance Service. Law Enforcement is provided by Bartholomew County Sheriff Department.

== School districts ==
- Bartholomew Consolidated School Corporation

== Political districts ==
- Indiana's 6th congressional district
- State House District 59
- State Senate District 41
