= Mineral Springs, Indiana =

- Unincorporated community and Census-designated place
- Location within Indiana Location within the United States
- Coordinates: 39°07′56″N 85°51′39″W
- Country: United States
- State: Indiana
- County: Bartholomew
- Township: Wayne
- Elevation: 607 ft (185 m)
- Time zone: UTC-5 (Eastern (EST))
  - Summer (DST): UTC-4 (EDT)
- ZIP code: 47201
- GNIS feature ID: 2830313

Mineral Springs is an unincorporated community in Sand Creek Township, Bartholomew County, in the U.S. state of Indiana.

== Geography ==
Mineral Springs is located approximately 5.5 miles southeast of Columbus, Indiana.

== Demographics ==
The United States Census Bureau defined Mineral Springs as a census designated place in the 2022 American Community Survey.
