= North Ogilville, Indiana =

- Unincorporated community
- Bartholomew County's location in Indiana

- Location in Bartholomew County
- Coordinates: 39°07′55″N 86°00′28″W
- Country: United States
- State: Indiana
- County: Bartholomew
- Township: Ohio
- Elevation: 653 ft (199 m)
- Time zone: UTC-5 (Eastern (EST))
  - Summer (DST): UTC-4 (EDT)
- ZIP code: 47201
- FIPS code: 18-54990
- GNIS feature ID: 440282

North Ogilville is an unincorporated community in Ohio Township, Bartholomew County, in the U.S. state of Indiana. North Ogilville is located north of Ogilville on State Route 58, hence the name.
