= Pleasant View Village, Indiana =

- Unincorporated community Census designated place
- Location within Indiana Location within the United States
- Coordinates: 39°20′10.2″N 85°58′34.1″W
- Country: United States
- State: Indiana
- County: Bartholomew
- Township: German

Area
  - Total: 0.197 sq mi (0.51 km^{2})
  - Land: 0.197 sq mi (0.51 km^{2})
  - Water: 0.000 sq mi (0 km^{2})
- Elevation: 663 ft (202 m)

Population (2023)
  - Total: 741
- Time zone: UTC-5 (Eastern (EST))
  - Summer (DST): UTC-4 (EDT)
- FIPS code: 18-60696
- GNIS feature ID: 2830316

Pleasant View Village is an unincorporated community and census designated place (CDP) in German Township, Bartholomew County, in the U.S. state of Indiana.

== Demographics ==
Historical population
Census	Pop.	Note	%±
2023 (est.)	714

The United States Census Bureau defined Pleasant View Village as a census designated place in the 2022 American Community Survey.
