= Clay Township, Bartholomew County, Indiana =

Clay Township
- Township
- Location in Bartholomew County
- Coordinates: 39°13′26″N 85°49′02″W
- Country: United States
- State: Indiana
- County: Bartholomew

Government
  - Type: Indiana township

Area
  - Total: 23.16 sq mi (60.0 km^{2})
  - Land: 23.15 sq mi (60.0 km^{2})
  - Water: 0.01 sq mi (0.026 km^{2}) 0.04%
- Elevation: 640 ft (195 m)

Population (2020)
  - Total: 3,145
  - Density: 141.3/sq mi (54.6/km^{2})
- ZIP codes: 47201, 47203, 47246
- GNIS feature ID: 0453204

Clay Township is one of twelve townships in Bartholomew County, Indiana, United States. As of the 2010 census, its population was 3,271 and it contained 1,320 housing units.

== Geography ==
According to the 2010 census, the township has a total area of 23.16 square miles (60.0 km^{2}), of which 23.15 square miles (60.0 km^{2}) (or 99.96%) is land and 0.01 square miles (0.026 km^{2}) (or 0.04%) is water.

=== Cities, towns, villages ===
- Columbus (east edge)

=== Unincorporated towns ===
- Jewell Village
- Petersville

This list is based on USGS data and may include former settlements.

=== Adjacent townships ===
- Haw Creek Township (northeast)
- Clifty Township (east)
- Rock Creek Township (southeast)
- Columbus Township (west)
- Flat Rock Township (northwest)

=== Cemeteries ===
The township contains these two cemeteries: Sand Hill and Sharon.

=== Major highways ===
- U.S. Route 31
- State Road 9
- State Road 46

=== Landmarks ===
- Otter Creek County Golf Course

== School districts ==
- Bartholomew Consolidated School Corporation

== Political districts ==
- Indiana's 6th congressional district
- State House District 57
- State Senate District 41
