= Ohio Township, Bartholomew County, Indiana =

Township in the United States

Ohio Township
- Township
- Location in Bartholomew County
- Coordinates: 39°07′31″N 86°01′40″W
- Country: United States
- State: Indiana
- County: Bartholomew

Government
  - Type: Indiana township

Area
  - Total: 20.26 sq mi (52.5 km^{2})
  - Land: 19.75 sq mi (51.2 km^{2})
  - Water: 0.51 sq mi (1.3 km^{2}) 2.52%
- Elevation: 676 ft (206 m)

Population (2020)
  - Total: 1,756
  - Density: 90.5/sq mi (34.9/km^{2})
- ZIP code: 47201
- GNIS feature ID: 0453682

Ohio Township is one of twelve townships in Bartholomew County, Indiana, United States. As of the 2010 census, its population was 1,787 and it contained 782 housing units.

== Geography ==
According to the 2010 census, the township has a total area of 20.26 square miles (52.5 km^{2}), of which 19.75 square miles (51.2 km^{2}) (or 97.48%) is land and 0.51 square miles (1.3 km^{2}) (or 2.52%) is water.

=== Unincorporated towns ===
- Grandview Lake
- North Ogilville
- Ogilville

(This list is based on USGS data and may include former settlements.)

=== Adjacent townships ===
- Harrison Township (north)
- Columbus Township (northeast)
- Wayne Township (east)
- Jackson Township (south)
- Van Buren Township, Brown County (west)

=== Cemeteries ===
The township contains these two cemeteries: Roth and Saint Paul.

=== Lakes ===
- Noblitt Lake

== School districts ==
- Bartholomew Consolidated School Corporation

== Political districts ==
- Indiana's 9th congressional district
- State House District 65
- State Senate District 41
