= Jewell Village, Indiana =

- Unincorporated community
- Bartholomew County's location in Indiana

- Location in Bartholomew County
- Coordinates: 39°11′55″N 85°50′59″W
- Country: United States
- State: Indiana
- County: Bartholomew
- Township: Clay
- Elevation: 656 ft (200 m)
- Time zone: UTC-5 (Eastern (EST))
  - Summer (DST): UTC-4 (EDT)
- ZIP code: 47203
- Area codes: 812 & 930
- GNIS feature ID: 437005

Jewell Village is an unincorporated community in Clay Township, Bartholomew county, in the U.S. state of Indiana.

== History ==
Jewell Village was likely named on account of there being many people named Jewell in the vicinity.
