= Kansas, Indiana =

- Ghost town
- Bartholomew County's location in Indiana

- Location in Bartholomew County
- Coordinates: 39°19′53″N 86°01′57″W
- Country: United States
- State: Indiana
- County: Bartholomew
- Platted: 1855
- Elevation: 692 ft (211 m)
- Time zone: UTC-5 (Eastern (EST))
  - Summer (DST): UTC-4 (EDT)
- ZIP code: 47201
- Area codes: 812 & 930
- GNIS feature ID: 452133

Kansas was a former unincorporated community in Bartholomew County, in the U.S. state of Indiana.

The community now lies within the boundaries of Camp Atterbury.

== History ==
Kansas was laid out in 1855. A post office was established at Kansas in 1856, and remained in operation until it was discontinued in 1863.
