= Burnsville, Indiana =

- Unincorporated community
- Bartholomew County's location in Indiana

- Location in Bartholomew County
- Coordinates: 39°10′22″N 85°44′25″W
- Country: United States
- State: Indiana
- County: Bartholomew
- Township: Rock Creek
- Elevation: 686 ft (209 m)
- Time zone: UTC-5 (Eastern (EST))
  - Summer (DST): UTC-4 (EDT)
- ZIP code: 47203
- FIPS code: 18-09406
- GNIS feature ID: 431858

Burnsville is an unincorporated community in Rock Creek Township, Bartholomew County, in the U.S. state of Indiana.

== History ==
Burnsville was founded in 1845. It was named for its founder, Brice Burns. Burnsville had a post office between 1852 and 1903.
