= Jackson Township, Bartholomew County, Indiana =

Jackson Township
- Township
- Location in Bartholomew County
- Coordinates: 39°03′53″N 86°02′13″W
- Country: United States
- State: Indiana
- County: Bartholomew

Government
  - Type: Indiana township

Area
  - Total: 20.8 sq mi (54 km^{2})
  - Land: 20.62 sq mi (53.4 km^{2})
  - Water: 0.18 sq mi (0.47 km^{2}) 0.87%
- Elevation: 597 ft (182 m)

Population (2020)
  - Total: 962
  - Density: 46/sq mi (18/km^{2})
- ZIP codes: 47201, 47274
- GNIS feature ID: 0453430

Jackson Township is one of twelve townships in Bartholomew County, Indiana, United States. As of the 2010 census, its population was 949 and it contained 463 housing units.

== Geography ==
According to the 2010 census, the township has a total area of 20.8 square miles (54 km^{2}), of which 20.62 square miles (53.4 km^{2}) (or 99.13%) is land and 0.18 square miles (0.47 km^{2}) (or 0.87%) is water.

=== Unincorporated towns ===
- Mount Healthy
- Waymansville

(This list is based on USGS data and may include former settlements.)

=== Adjacent townships ===
- Ohio Township (north)
- Wayne Township (east)
- Hamilton Township, Jackson County (south)
- Pershing Township, Jackson County (southwest)
- Van Buren Township, Brown County (west)

=== Major highways ===
- Indiana State Road 58

=== Lakes ===
- Lutheran Lake

== School districts ==
- Bartholomew Consolidated School Corporation

== Political districts ==
- Indiana's 9th congressional district
- State House District 65
- State Senate District 41
