= Waynesville, Indiana =

- Unincorporated community Census designated place
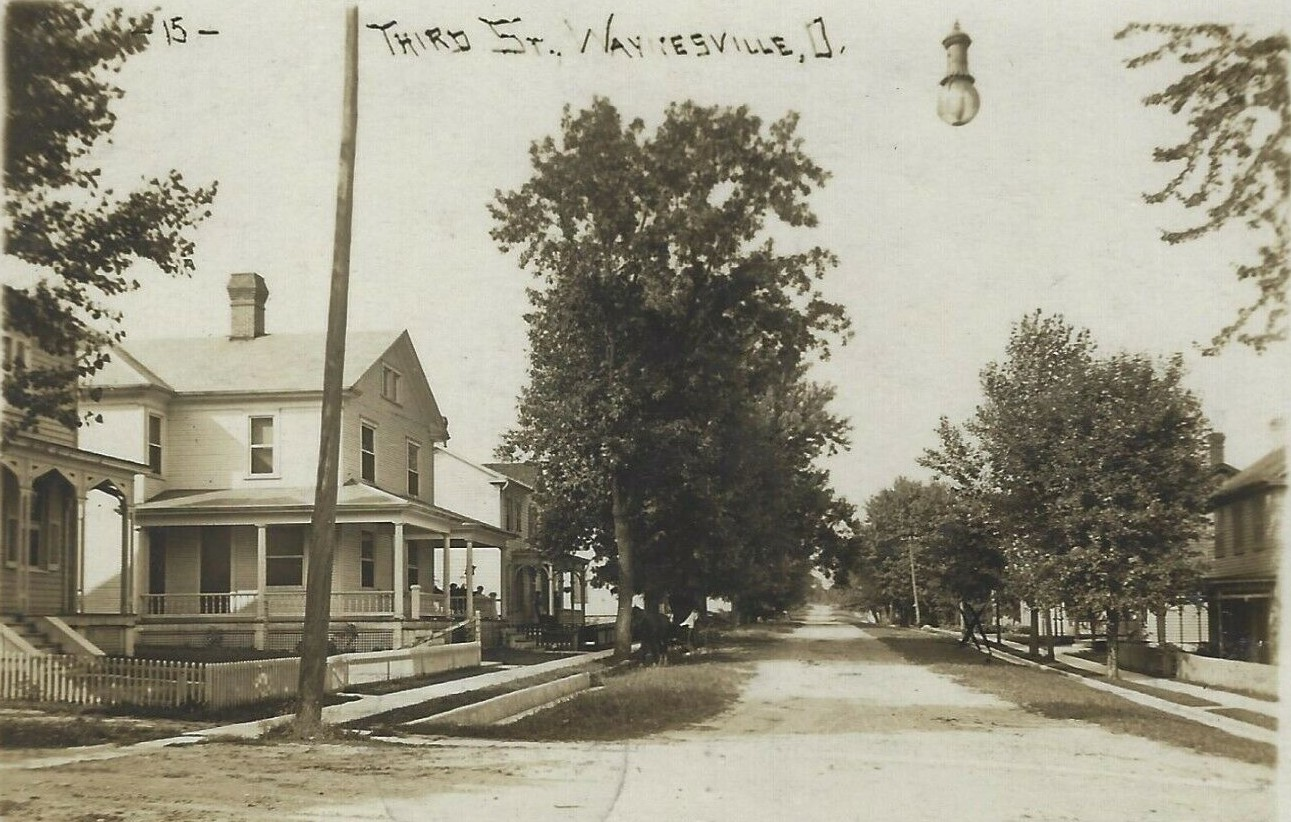
- Waynesville in 1912

- Bartholomew County's location in Indiana

- Location in Bartholomew County
- Coordinates: 39°06′47″N 85°53′28″W
- Country: United States
- State: Indiana
- County: Bartholomew
- Township: Wayne
- Elevation: 600 ft (180 m)
- Time zone: UTC-5 (Eastern (EST))
  - Summer (DST): UTC-4 (EDT)
- ZIP code: 47201
- FIPS code: 18-82034
- GNIS feature ID: 2830319

Waynesville is an unincorporated community and census designated place (CDP) in Wayne Township, Bartholomew County, in the U.S. state of Indiana.

== History ==
A post office was established at Waynesville in 1853 and remained in operation until it was discontinued in 1907.

== Demographics ==
Historical population
Census	Pop.	Note	%±
1870	104		—
2023 (est.)	113
U.S. Decennial Census

Waynesville has appeared once as a separate return in the Decennial U.S. Census. In 1870, the community has a population of 104.

The United States Census Bureau defined Waynesville as a census designated place in the 2022 American Community Survey.
