= Waymansville, Indiana =

- Unincorporated community
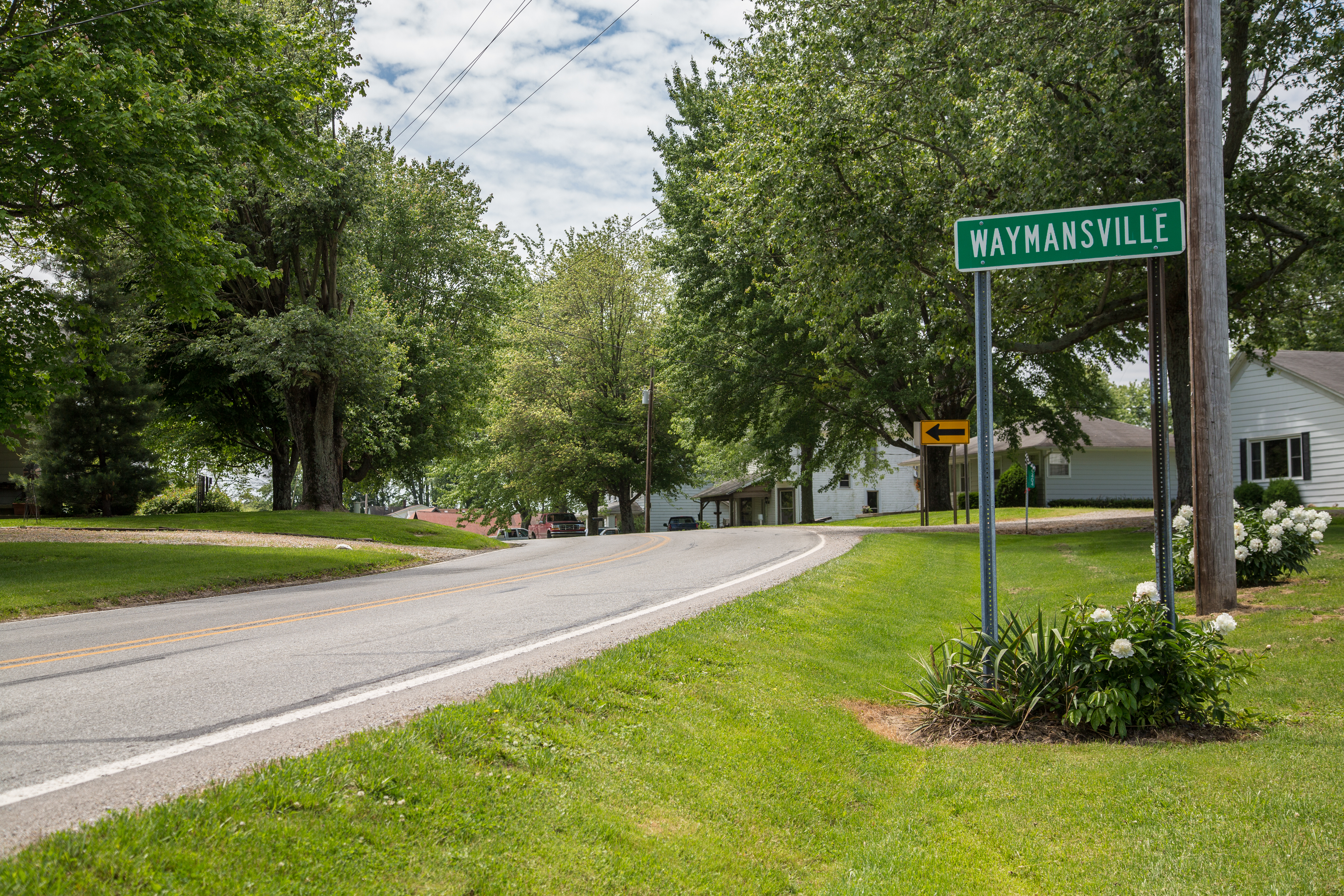

- Bartholomew County's location in Indiana

- Location in Bartholomew County
- Coordinates: 39°03′47″N 86°02′35″W
- Country: United States
- State: Indiana
- County: Bartholomew
- Township: Jackson
- Elevation: 610 ft (190 m)
- Time zone: UTC-5 (Eastern (EST))
  - Summer (DST): UTC-4 (EDT)
- ZIP code: 47201
- FIPS code: 18-81602
- GNIS feature ID: 451610

Waymansville is an unincorporated community in Jackson Township, Bartholomew County, in the U.S. state of Indiana.

== History ==
Waymansville had a post office between 1860 and 1940. The community was named for its founder, Charles L. Wayman. Waymansville has one church, named St. Peter Lutheran Church. It was founded in 1871 and is a member of the Lutheran Church - Missouri Synod.

== Demographics ==
Historical population
Census	Pop.	Note	%±
1870	55		—
U.S. Decennial Census

Waymansville appeared as a separately-returned community in the U.S. Census of 1870, when it had a reported population of 55 residents.
