= Ivy Tech Community College Columbus =

Coordinates: 39°15′0″N 85°54′10″W

- Motto: "OUR COMMUNITIES. YOUR COLLEGE."
- Type: Public
- Established: 1963
- Chancellor: Steven B. Combs
- Undergraduates: 9,200
- Location: Columbus, Indiana, USA (United States)
- Campus: 4475 Central Avenue, Columbus, IN, 47203
- Website: https://www.ivytech.edu/columbus

The Columbus Region of Ivy Tech Community College serves Bartholomew County, Johnson County, Jackson County, Decatur County, Jennings County, and Shelby County. Other instructional locations include: Franklin, Greensburg, North Vernon, Shelbyville, and Seymour.

== Academics ==
Associate degrees, Applied associate degrees, and Certificates are awarded.
