= Jonesville, Indiana =

- Town
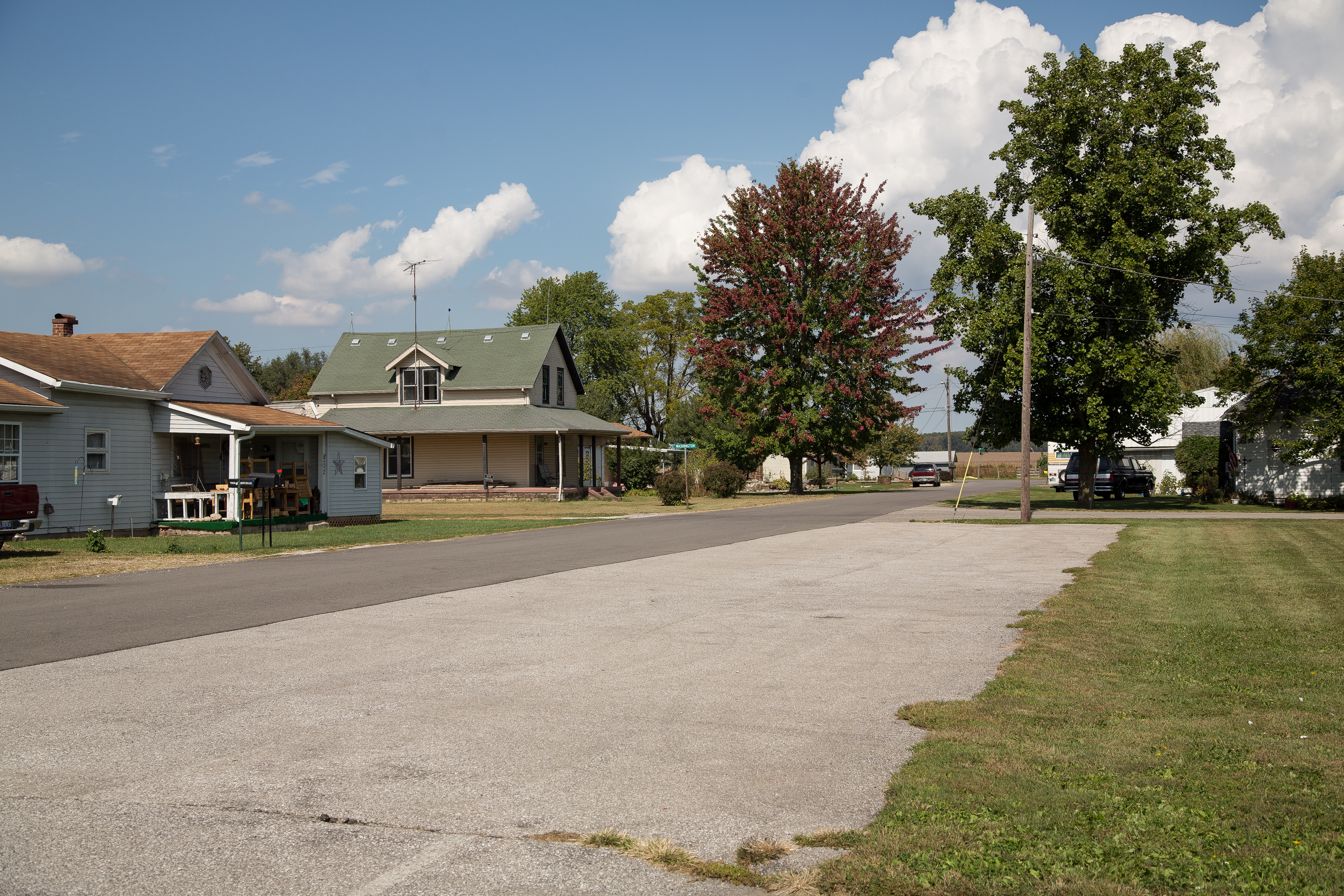

- Location of Jonesville in Bartholomew County, Indiana.
- Coordinates: 39°03′35″N 85°53′16″W
- Country: United States
- State: Indiana
- County: Bartholomew
- Township: Wayne
- Established: 1851
- Named after: Benjamin Jones

Area
  - Total: 0.14 sq mi (0.37 km^{2})
  - Land: 0.14 sq mi (0.37 km^{2})
  - Water: 0 sq mi (0.00 km^{2})
- Elevation: 591 ft (180 m)

Population (2020)
  - Total: 178
  - Density: 1,256.0/sq mi (484.93/km^{2})
- Time zone: UTC-5 (EST)
  - Summer (DST): UTC-5 (EST)
- ZIP code: 47247
- Area code: 812
- FIPS code: 18-38916
- GNIS feature ID: 2397012

Jonesville is a town in Wayne Township, Bartholomew County, in the U.S. state of Indiana. The population was 178 at the 2020 census. It is part of the Columbus, Indiana metropolitan statistical area.

== History ==
Jonesville was founded in 1851. It was named for its founder, Benjamin Jones. A post office was established in Jonesville in 1852.

== Geography ==
According to the 2010 census, Jonesville has a total area of 0.13 square miles (0.34 km^{2}), all land.

=== Climate ===
The climate in this area is characterized by hot, humid summers and generally mild to cool winters. According to the Köppen Climate Classification system, Jonesville has a humid subtropical climate, abbreviated "Cfa" on climate maps.

== Demographics ==
Historical population
| Census | Pop. | Note | %± |
|---|---|---|---|
| 1870 | 206 | | — |
| 1880 | 266 | | 29.1% |
| 1900 | 268 | | — |
| 1910 | 213 | | −20.5% |
| 1920 | 213 | | 0.0% |
| 1930 | 162 | | −23.9% |
| 1940 | 181 | | 11.7% |
| 1950 | 225 | | 24.3% |
| 1960 | 196 | | −12.9% |
| 1970 | 202 | | 3.1% |
| 1980 | 213 | | 5.4% |
| 1990 | 221 | | 3.8% |
| 2000 | 220 | | −0.5% |
| 2010 | 177 | | −19.5% |
| 2020 | 178 | | 0.6% |
U.S. Decennial Census

=== 2010 census ===
As of the census of 2010, there were 177 people, 77 households, and 51 families living in the town. The population density was 1,361.5 inhabitants per square mile (525.7/km^{2}). There were 86 housing units at an average density of 661.5 per square mile (255.4/km^{2}). The racial makeup of the town was 92.7% White, 2.3% Native American, 3.4% from other races, and 1.7% from two or more races. Hispanic or Latino of any race were 4.0% of the population.

There were 77 households, of which 19.5% had children under the age of 18 living with them, 44.2% were married couples living together, 13.0% had a female householder with no husband present, 9.1% had a male householder with no wife present, and 33.8% were non-families. 24.7% of all households were made up of individuals, and 10.4% had someone living alone who was 65 years of age or older. The average household size was 2.30 and the average family size was 2.75.

The median age in the town was 45.1 years. 17.5% of residents were under the age of 18; 7.9% were between the ages of 18 and 24; 24.3% were from 25 to 44; 31% were from 45 to 64; and 19.2% were 65 years of age or older. The gender makeup of the town was 50.3% male and 49.7% female.

=== 2000 census ===
As of the census of 2000, there were 220 people, 83 households, and 60 families living in the town. The population density was 1,701.8 inhabitants per square mile (657.1/km^{2}). There were 93 housing units at an average density of 719.4 per square mile (277.8/km^{2}). The racial makeup of the town was 95.00% White, 3.64% African American, 0.45% Native American, 0.45% from other races, and 0.45% from two or more races. Hispanic or Latino of any race were 0.45% of the population.

There were 83 households, out of which 36.1% had children under the age of 18 living with them, 63.9% were married couples living together, 6.0% had a female householder with no husband present, and 27.7% were non-families. 22.9% of all households were made up of individuals, and 8.4% had someone living alone who was 65 years of age or older. The average household size was 2.65 and the average family size was 3.12.

In the town, the population was spread out, with 28.2% under the age of 18, 6.4% from 18 to 24, 29.5% from 25 to 44, 20.0% from 45 to 64, and 15.9% who were 65 years of age or older. The median age was 33 years. For every 100 females, there were 122.2 males. For every 100 females age 18 and over, there were 113.5 males.

The median income for a household in the town was $30,694, and the median income for a family was $48,750. Males had a median income of $30,781 versus $23,333 for females. The per capita income for the town was $17,995. About 3.1% of families and 4.7% of the population were below the poverty line, including none of those under the age of eighteen and 8.6% of those 65 or over.

== Notable person ==
- Lora L. Corum - winner of the 1924 Indy 500
