= Grammer, Indiana =

- Unincorporated community
- Bartholomew County's location in Indiana

- Location in Bartholomew County
- Coordinates: 39°09′10″N 85°43′33″W
- Country: United States
- State: Indiana
- County: Bartholomew
- Township: Rock Creek
- Elevation: 722 ft (220 m)
- Time zone: UTC-5 (Eastern (EST))
  - Summer (DST): UTC-4 (EDT)
- ZIP code: 47232
- FIPS code: 18-28620
- GNIS feature ID: 2830310

Grammer is an unincorporated community in Rock Creek Township, Bartholomew County, in the U.S. state of Indiana.

== History ==
A post office was established at Grammer in 1893 and remained in operation until it was discontinued in 1972. Grammer was likely named for a railroad official. The town had two general stores operating simultaneously in the 1940s and 1950s as well as a barber shop and grain elevator. Grammer School, built in 1899, operated as a 1-8 school until consolidating with Rock Creek School in 1958.

== Demographics ==
The United States Census Bureau delineated Grammer as a census designated place in the 2022 American Community Survey.

== Notable people ==
- Jim McWithey, Indy car driver
