= Walesboro, Indiana =

- Unincorporated community and Census-designated place
- Bartholomew County's location in Indiana

- Location in Bartholomew County
- Coordinates: 39°08′33″N 85°54′43″W
- Country: United States
- State: Indiana
- County: Bartholomew
- Township: Wayne
- Elevation: 607 ft (185 m)
- Time zone: UTC-5 (Eastern (EST))
  - Summer (DST): UTC-4 (EDT)
- ZIP code: 47201
- GNIS feature ID: 2830318

Walesboro is an unincorporated community in Wayne Township, Bartholomew County, in the U.S. state of Indiana.

== History ==
A post office was established at Walesboro (also historically spelled Wailesborough, Wailesboro, and Waylesburg) in 1852, and it remained in operation until 1907. The community was named for its founder, John P. Wales.

== Geography ==
The community is located on Indiana State Road 11 and is three miles east of Interstate 65.

== Demographics ==
Historical population
Census	Pop.	Note	%±
1870	101		—
2023 (est.)	778

Walesboro has appeared in only one Decennial U.S. Census as a separately-returned community. In 1870, it was reported to have 101 inhabitants.

The United States Census Bureau delineated Wadesville as a census designated place in the 2022 American Community Survey.
