= Rock Creek Township, Bartholomew County, Indiana =

Rock Creek Township
- Township
- Location in Bartholomew County
- Coordinates: 39°09′58″N 85°45′22″W
- Country: United States
- State: Indiana
- County: Bartholomew

Government
  - Type: Indiana township

Area
  - Total: 26.59 sq mi (68.9 km^{2})
  - Land: 26.58 sq mi (68.8 km^{2})
  - Water: 0.02 sq mi (0.052 km^{2}) 0.08%
- Elevation: 699 ft (213 m)

Population (2020)
  - Total: 1,402
  - Density: 53.6/sq mi (20.7/km^{2})
- ZIP codes: 47203, 47232, 47244, 47283
- GNIS feature ID: 0453808

Rock Creek Township is one of twelve townships in Bartholomew County, Indiana, United States. As of the 2010 census, its population was 1,424 and it contained 566 housing units.

== Geography ==
According to the 2010 census, the township has a total area of 26.59 square miles (68.9 km^{2}), of which 26.58 square miles (68.8 km^{2}) (or 99.96%) is land and 0.02 square miles (0.052 km^{2}) (or 0.08%) is water.

=== Unincorporated towns ===
- Burnsville
- Grammer

=== Extinct towns ===
- Plumsock

=== Adjacent townships ===
- Clifty Township (north)
- Jackson Township, Decatur County (east)
- Geneva Township, Jennings County (south)
- Sand Creek Township (southwest)
- Columbus Township (west)
- Clay Township (northwest)

=== Cemeteries ===
The township contains the following cemeteries: Donaldson, Parkison (Bannister), Burnsville Christian, Carson (private), and a portion of Little Sandcreek Baptist. Two cemeteries have vanished: Morgan and Strickland.

=== Major highways ===
- Indiana State Road 7
- Indiana State Road 9

== School districts ==
- Bartholomew Consolidated School Corporation

== Political districts ==
- Indiana's 9th congressional district
- State House District 57
- State Senate District 41

== Politics ==
Rock Creek Township has been cited by some in Indiana politics as being a barometer to the rest of the state's political disposition during elections. This is in large part due to the even distribution of both Republicans and Democrats in the township. In addition to Indiana, some stories have surfaced that tell of national news agencies checking on the township vote totals during the early and middle half of the 20th century for the same reasons.
