= Mount Healthy, Indiana =

- Unincorporated community
- Bartholomew County's location in Indiana

- Location in Bartholomew County Mount Healthy (Indiana) Mount Healthy (the United States)
- Coordinates: 39°04′50″N 86°02′16″W
- Country: United States
- State: Indiana
- County: Bartholomew
- Township: Jackson
- Elevation: 643 ft (196 m)
- Time zone: UTC-5 (Eastern (EST))
  - Summer (DST): UTC-4 (EDT)
- ZIP code: 47201
- FIPS code: 18-51426
- GNIS feature ID: 451244

Mount Healthy is an unincorporated community in Jackson Township, Bartholomew County, in the U.S. state of Indiana.

== History ==
A post office was established at Mount Healthy in 1850, and remained in operation until it was discontinued in 1888. Mount Healthy was named for its lofty elevation and its natural mineral water springs. In the past, people would come to Mount Healthy to purchase mineral water. The town was laid out in 1851 by William Howbert and had 18 lots and streets were eighty eight feet wide. The town was originally intended as an influential education center and was home to the Mt. Healthy Seminary. The spring water business which also sprang up bottled the water and it was distributed by an Indianapolis firm. At its peak, the town had around 50 inhabitants.
