= Stony Lonesome, Indiana =

- Unincorporated community
- Bartholomew County's location in Indiana

- Location in Bartholomew County
- Coordinates: 39°12′03″N 86°03′44″W
- Country: United States
- State: Indiana
- County: Bartholomew
- Township: Harrison
- Elevation: 725 ft (221 m)
- Time zone: UTC-5 (Eastern (EST))
  - Summer (DST): UTC-4 (EDT)
- ZIP code: 47201
- FIPS code: 18-73592
- GNIS feature ID: 444229

Stony Lonesome (also spelled Stoney Lonesome) is an unincorporated community in Harrison Township, Bartholomew County, in the U.S. state of Indiana.

== History ==
Stony Lonesome was likely named on account of its rocky and isolated terrain. The community has been noted for its unusual place name.
