= Bethany, Bartholomew County, Indiana =

Bethany
- Unincorporated community
- Bartholomew County's location in Indiana

- Location in Bartholomew County
- Coordinates: 39°10′26″N 86°03′55″W
- Country: United States
- State: Indiana
- County: Bartholomew
- Township: Harrison
- Elevation: 896 ft (273 m)
- Time zone: UTC-5 (Eastern (EST))
  - Summer (DST): UTC-4 (EDT)
- ZIP code: 47201
- Area codes: 812 & 930
- GNIS feature ID: 430859

Bethany is an unincorporated community in Harrison Township, Bartholomew County, in the U.S. state of Indiana.

== History ==
An old variant name of the community was called South Bethany. A post office was established under this name in 1861, and remained in operation until it was discontinued in 1903.

== Demographics ==
Historical population
Census	Pop.	Note	%±
1870	54		—
U.S. Decennial Census

Bethany appeared as a separately-returned community in only one U.S. Census. In 1870, the census reported that the town had a population of 54 residents.
