= Ogilville, Indiana =

- Unincorporated community
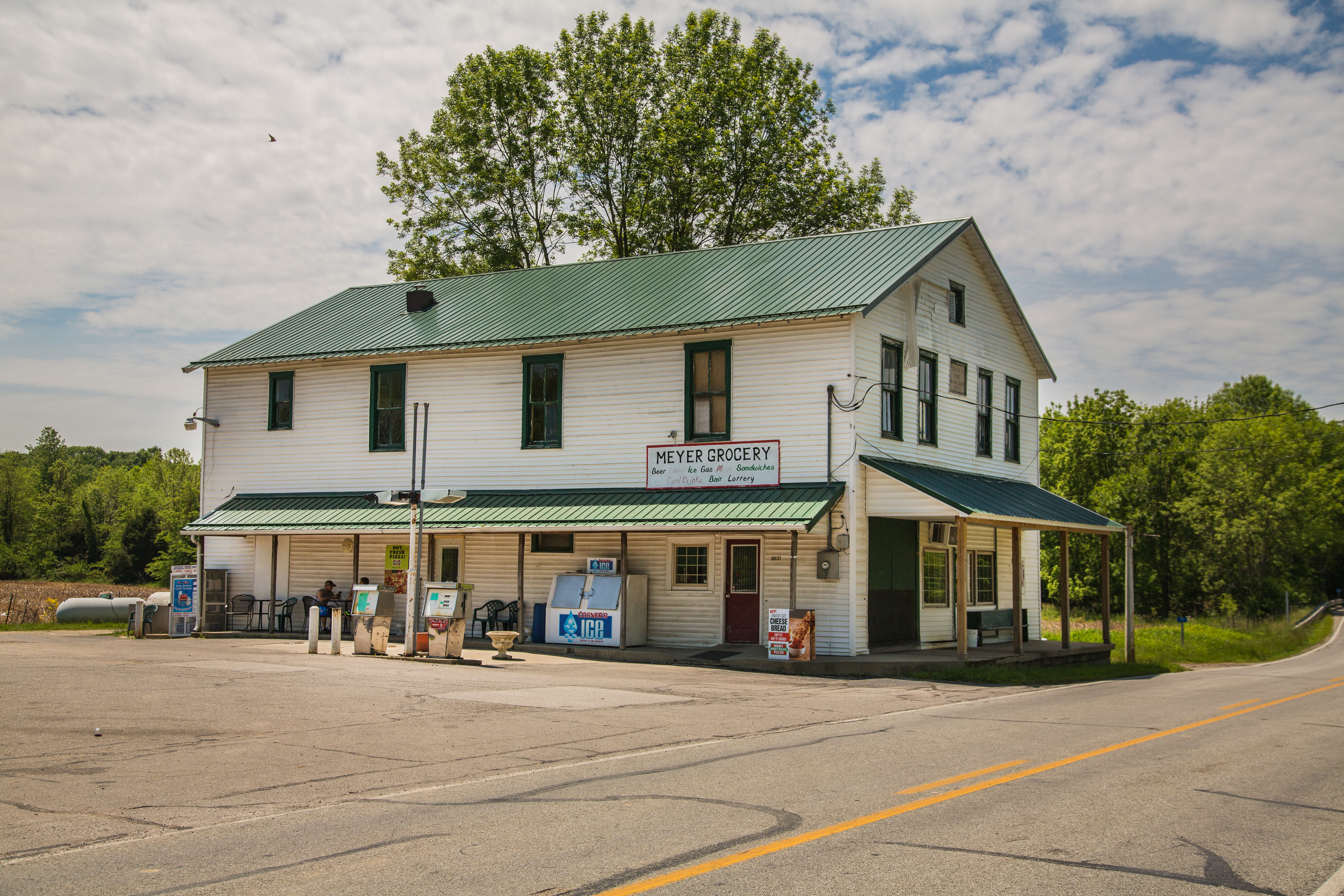
- Meyer Grocery in Ogilville

- Bartholomew County's location in Indiana

- Location in Bartholomew County
- Coordinates: 39°07′33″N 86°00′55″W
- Country: United States
- State: Indiana
- County: Bartholomew
- Township: Ohio
- Elevation: 633 ft (193 m)
- Time zone: UTC-5 (Eastern (EST))
  - Summer (DST): UTC-4 (EDT)
- ZIP code: 47201
- FIPS code: 18-56106
- GNIS feature ID: 440518

Ogilville is an unincorporated community in Ohio Township, Bartholomew County, in the U.S. state of Indiana. The community is located along State Road 58 close to where it crosses over East Fork White Creek. It is located southwest on SR 58 of North Ogilville.

== History ==
The town was originally named Moore's Vineyard and was first started in 1850 with the opening of a grist and saw mill along with a general store. At the same time in 1850, Burris Moore was the first Postmaster. The original name was changed to Ogilville around 1889. It was likely named for the Ogilvie family of settlers. A post office was established at Ogilville in 1893, and remained in operation until it was discontinued in 1931.
