= Camp Atterbury-Muscatatuck =

Indiana National Guard post located in southern Indiana

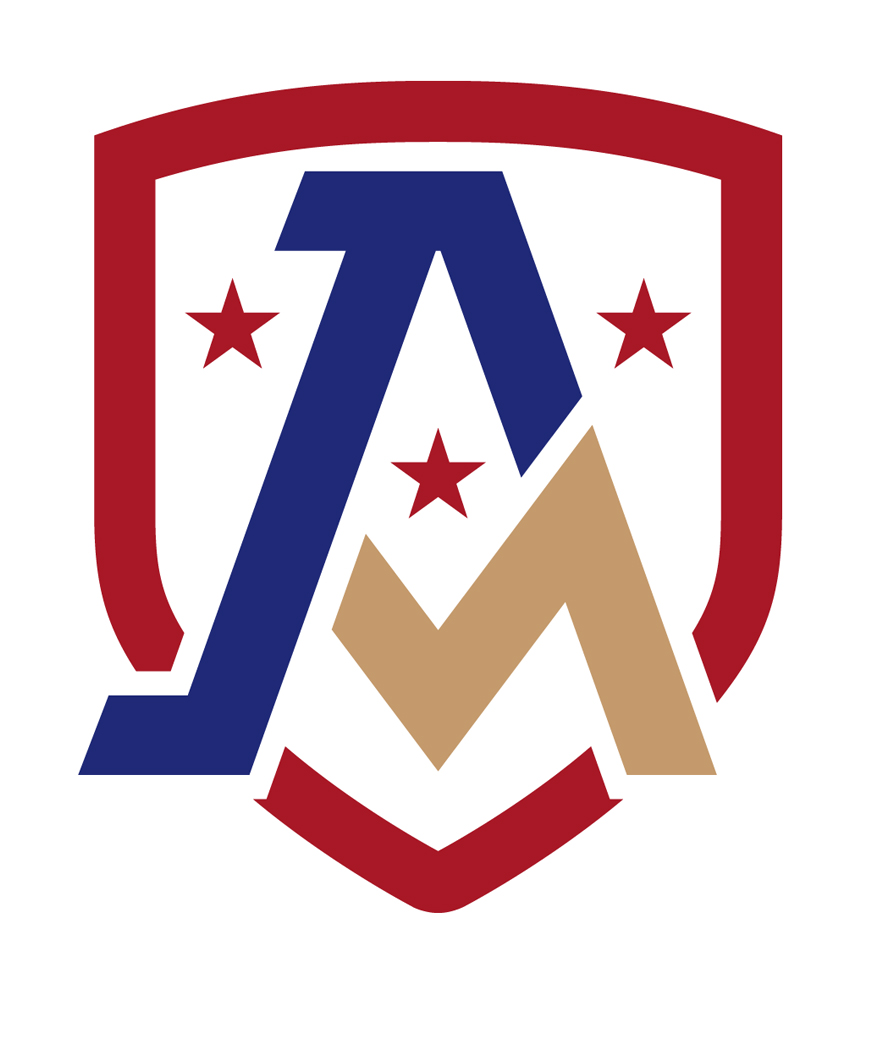
- Camp Atterbury Joint Maneuver Training Center

Site information
- Type: Army and Air National Guard post
- Controlled by: United States
- Website: Official Website

Site history
- Built: 1942
- In use: 1942–46, 1950–54, 1969–present

Garrison information
- Current commander: COL Daniel Bell
- CDP
- Location in the United States Location in Indiana
- Coordinates: 39°21′N 86°02′W
- Country: United States
- State: Indiana
- Counties: Bartholomew, Johnson, Brown

Area
  - Total: 34,000 acres (14,000 ha)
- Time zone: UTC−5 (Eastern (EST))
- ZIP code: 46124
- Area code: 812

Camp Atterbury-Muscatatuck is a federally owned military post, licensed to and operated by the Indiana National Guard, located in south-central Indiana, 4 miles (6.4 km) west of Edinburgh, Indiana, and U.S. Route 31. The camp's mission is to provide full logistical and training support for up to two brigade-sized elements simultaneously. The camp offers a variety of training ranges, live-fire venues, managed airspace with air-to-ground fighting capabilities and a live, virtual, and constructive (LVC) simulation and exercise center. It is also the normal Annual Training location for National Guard and Reserve forces located in Indiana.

Established in 1942, Camp Atterbury's nicknames include "CAIN" and "The Rock." Its motto is Preparamus, meaning "We Are Ready."

== History ==
=== Site selection and construction ===
In January 1941 the U.S. War Department issued orders to consider potential sites for a new U.S. Army training center in Indiana. After the Hurd Engineering Company surveyed an estimated 50,000 acres (200 km^{2}), an area was selected for the camp in south-central Indiana, approximately 30 miles (48 km) south of Indianapolis, 12 miles (19 km) north of Columbus, and 4 miles (6.4 km) west of Edinburgh. The site, which includes portions of Johnson, Bartholomew, and Brown counties, was selected because of its terrain (some of it is level; other parts are hilly), its location near larger urban areas (such as Indianapolis, the state capital, and Columbus, the Bartholomew County seat of government), and its proximity to transportation (adjacent to a Pennsylvania Railroad line and U.S. Highway 31). On 28 April 1941, the U.S. War Department announced its intention to establish a military training camp that would be capable of housing 30,000 soldiers.

On 6 January 1942, one month after the attack on Pearl Harbor and the United States' entry into World War II, the U.S. War Department announced its decision to proceed with its plan to build Camp Atterbury. Initial land acquisition for the camp encompassed 40,351.5348 acres (163.296868 km^{2}) in 643 tracts. The land acquisition cost an estimated $3.8 million ($63,021,181 in 2022 chained dollars). In addition to the land, the site encompassed numerous farmsteads, the towns of Pisgah and Kansas, fifteen cemeteries, and five schools. Four of the area's fifteen cemeteries remained intact; the grave sites in the other cemeteries were exhumed and relocated.

Initial work at the site began in February 1942. The U.S. Army contracted John Richard Walsh as a real estate project manager to oversee the initial development at the camp that would accommodate and train a full-sized, triangular division of 40,000 soldiers. Various civilian contractors built the camp over a period of six months from February to August 1942. At the peak of construction in June 1942, there were 14,491 workers on the payroll. An estimated 700 vehicles and daily bus service provided transportation from nearby towns and an on-site concession tent served meals to 600 workers at a time.

On 6 February 1942, the War Department announced that the camp would be named in honor of Brigadier General William Wallace Atterbury, a New Albany, Indiana, native who received a Distinguished Service Medal for his contributions during World War I. In addition, Camp Atterbury was nicknamed Mudbury during its construction because of its muddy grounds, the result of heavy spring rains during 1942.

=== Official anniversary ===
Unlike most military installations, Camp Atterbury did not have an official dedication. Six months after construction started, Soldiers began to be unceremoniously transported to the camp to begin training. Instead, Camp Atterbury's anniversary falls on 15 August 1942, when the 83rd Infantry Division was activated. The camp was opened to visitors, and nearly 25,000 Hoosiers watched the opening ceremonies.

Camp Atterbury's second anniversary falls two months earlier, on 2 June 1942. Traditionally, Soldiers mark the activation of a post with the day that the first numbered Order is written. Camp Atterbury's first order rolled off a mimeograph machine on this day in the Camp's first headquarters building, a red brick house on hospital road and the former house of Dale Parmalee, a local farmer.

=== World War II-era facilities ===
Costs for initial construction were approximately $35 million ($580,458,248 in 2021 chained dollars). Buildings included soldiers' barracks, officers' quarters, mess halls, warehouses, post exchanges (PXs), chapels, theaters, and indoor and outdoor recreational facilities, as well as administrative and other support buildings, such as a library and post office. Facilities to provide water, sewer, and electricity were also installed in addition to construction of a spur of the Pennsylvania Railroad adjacent to the camp. The camp's training facilities also included twenty-one firing ranges and about thirty buildings arranged as a small town, nicknamed Tojoburg, to provide soldiers with field practice in a village setting.

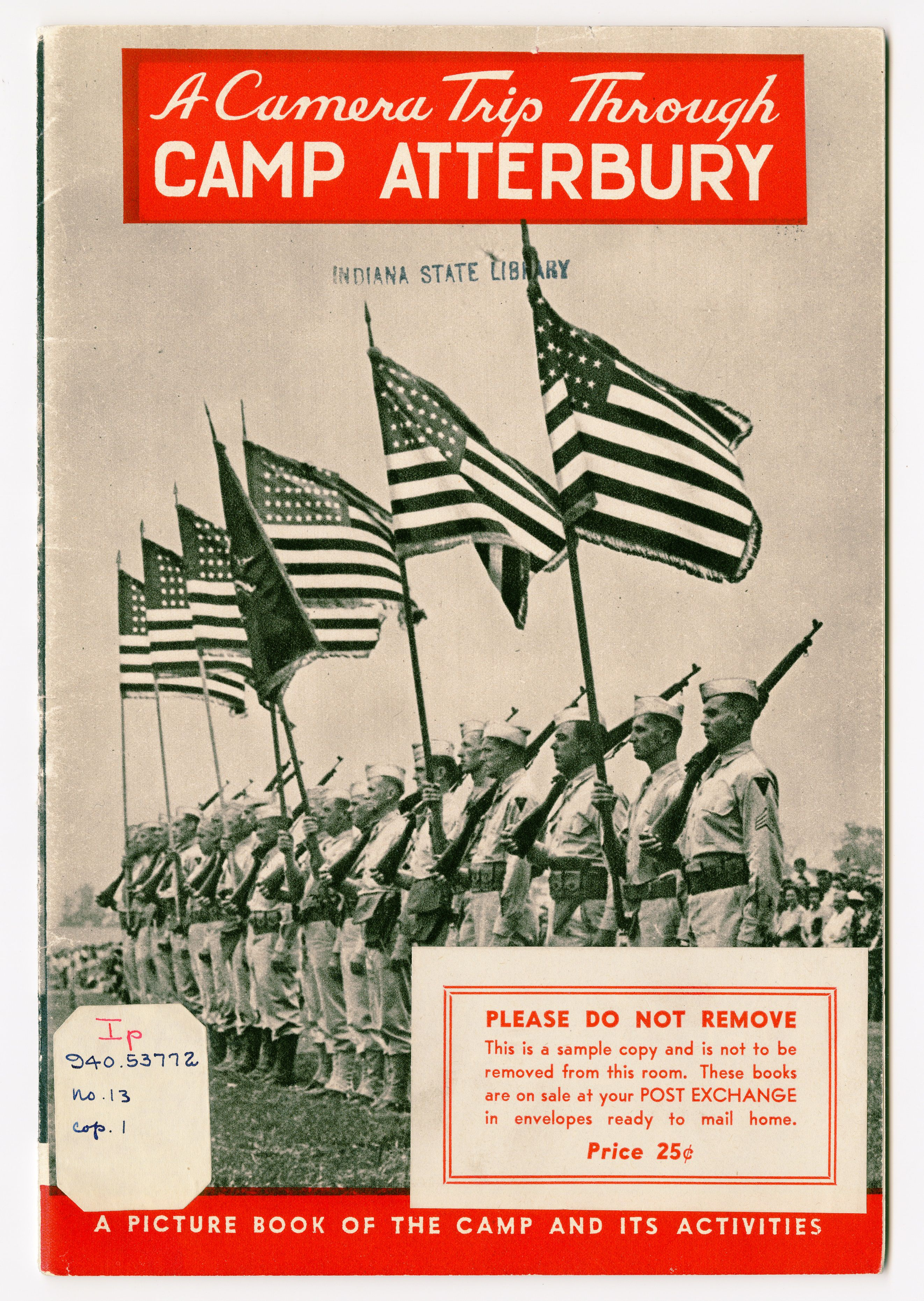
A booklet featuring photographs of the activities at Camp Atterbury during World War II.

At its largest, Camp Atterbury had 1,780 buildings and provided housing to 44,159 Officers and Soldiers, including: 499 Enlisted men barracks, 40 Bachelor Officer Quarters (BOQs), 23 Women's Army Corps (WAC) barracks, 61 Prisoners-of-War (POW) barracks, 193 Mess halls, 12 Chapels, 5 Service clubs, 3 Officer clubs, 6 Theatres, 4 Gymnasiums, 4 Swimming pools, 1 Hospital and convalescent center (68 building-campus occupying 80 acres).

=== Hospital and Convalescent Center ===
Camp Atterbury was the site of a state-of-the-art 1,700-bed hospital on approximately 75 acres (0.30 km^{2}) of land. Initial construction included forty-three, two-story buildings for patient wards, treatment facilities, mess halls, a post exchange, an auditorium, and a recreation center, as well as housing for medical officers, enlisted men, and nursing staff. Thirty-one of these concrete-block buildings had interconnecting corridors. With later expansion and remodeling, the facility evolved into a 6,000-bed hospital and convalescent center. In July 1942 a medical training school was established at Camp Atterbury and as demand for its services increased, the hospital was further expanded and remodeled. In August 1942 additional buildings were erected to provide space to train field hospital units.

In April 1944, when the post hospital was designated as a specialized general hospital for treatment of soldiers wounded in combat, it was under the command of Colonel Haskett L. Conner. The facility included 2,000 beds for hospital patients and a separate rehabilitation center for 3,000 convalescing soldiers. On 8 May 1944, the hospital was renamed Wakeman General Hospital, in honor of Colonel Frank B. Wakeman, a New York native. Colonel Wakeman attended Valparaiso University as an undergraduate student prior to his service in the Medical Corps during World War I, and received a medical degree from Indiana University in 1926 before returning to active duty in the U.S. Army Medical Corps. Colonel Wakeman served as Chief of the Training Division, Office of the Surgeon General of the U.S. Army, prior to his death in March 1944.

In July 1944 the Women's Army Corps Medical Department Enlisted Technicians' School was relocated to Camp Atterbury from Hot Springs, Arkansas. In a little more than a year, an estimated 3,800 WACs received their medical technology training at Wakeman Hospital. Some of them remained at Camp Atterbury after their training, while others continued their service at other U.S. Army hospitals.

In late 1944 and early 1945, the hospital and convalescent center's facilities were further expanded and remodeled in anticipation of an increase in demand for its services. Effective 5 April 1944, the 3547th Service Unit replaced the WAC and medical section of the 1560th Service Unit, and on 18 August, the hospital received its first casualties from England and France. The wounded arrived by airplane from Atterbury Army Air Field (modern-day Columbus Municipal Airport), about twelve miles away, and by train on the Pennsylvania Railroad.

Wakeman General, the largest hospital in the Fifth Service Command, was "one of the best equipped among the forty-three specialized general hospitals in the United States" in the 1940s. It specialized in plastic, neuro-, and orthopedic surgery and reconstructive treatment, and was especially known for its plastic eye replacements. By January 1945 Wakeman had a medical detachment of 1,600 personnel and about 700 civilians serving 6,000 patients. In addition to its staff, the hospital had the American Red Cross and a group of local women, known as the Gray Ladies, as volunteers to assist its patients. The Red Cross and United Service Organizations also provided entertainment in the form of recreational activities, shows, and special events.

On 20 April 1945, the Wakeman General and Convalescent Hospital, whose total capacity eventually reached 10,000 patients, was designated as the Wakeman Hospital Center. Soldiers who remained at Camp Atterbury for an extended period of recovery were housed in barracks within the camp about two miles from the hospital. Wakeman Hospital remained under the command of Lieutenant Colonel Ray M. Conner, followed by Colonel Frank L. Cole in May 1945 and Colonel Paul W. Crawford in January 1946. The convalescent center was under the command of Colonel Harry F. Becker.

Wakemen treated an estimated 85,000 patients during the war. It closed at the end of 1946 after its remaining patients were transferred to other hospitals. The WAC Medical Department Enlisted Technicians' School was relocated to San Antonio, Texas.

=== Commanders ===
During World War II, Camp Atterbury was under the command of a succession of military officers from its establishment in 1942 to its closure in 1946. Colonel Welton M. Modisett, who served as its first post commander, arrived in May 1942. He continued to serve in that capacity during the camp's use as a military training center and prisoner internment camp. Brigadier General Ernest A. Bixby succeeded Colonel Modisett as post commander in June 1945, when the camp was active as reception and separation center. Colonel Herbert H. Glidden succeeded General Bixby in June 1946, followed in August by Colonel John L. Gammett, who had been the commander in charge of the internment camp, and Colonel Carter A. McLennon, who arrived in September. Colonel McLennon was Camp Atterbury's commander when it closed in December 1946.

=== Units trained during World War II ===
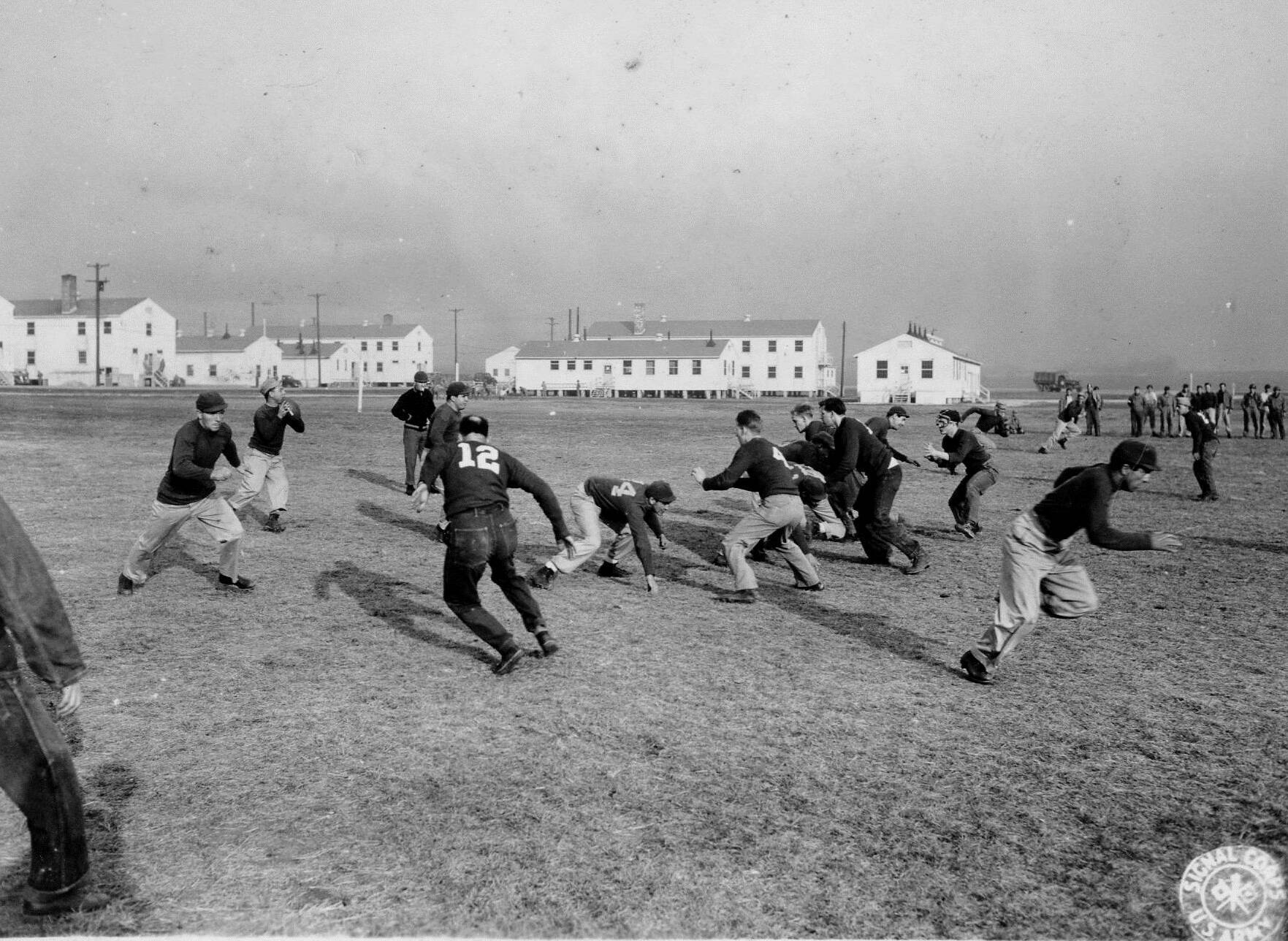
The 773rd Tank Destroyer Battalion winning the touch football championship at Camp Atterbury during World War II

During its use as a military training facility between 1942 and 1944, four U.S. Army infantry divisions trained at the camp before they were deployed overseas: the 30th, 83rd, 92nd, and 106th infantry divisions. Camp Atterbury also trained numerous service support units.

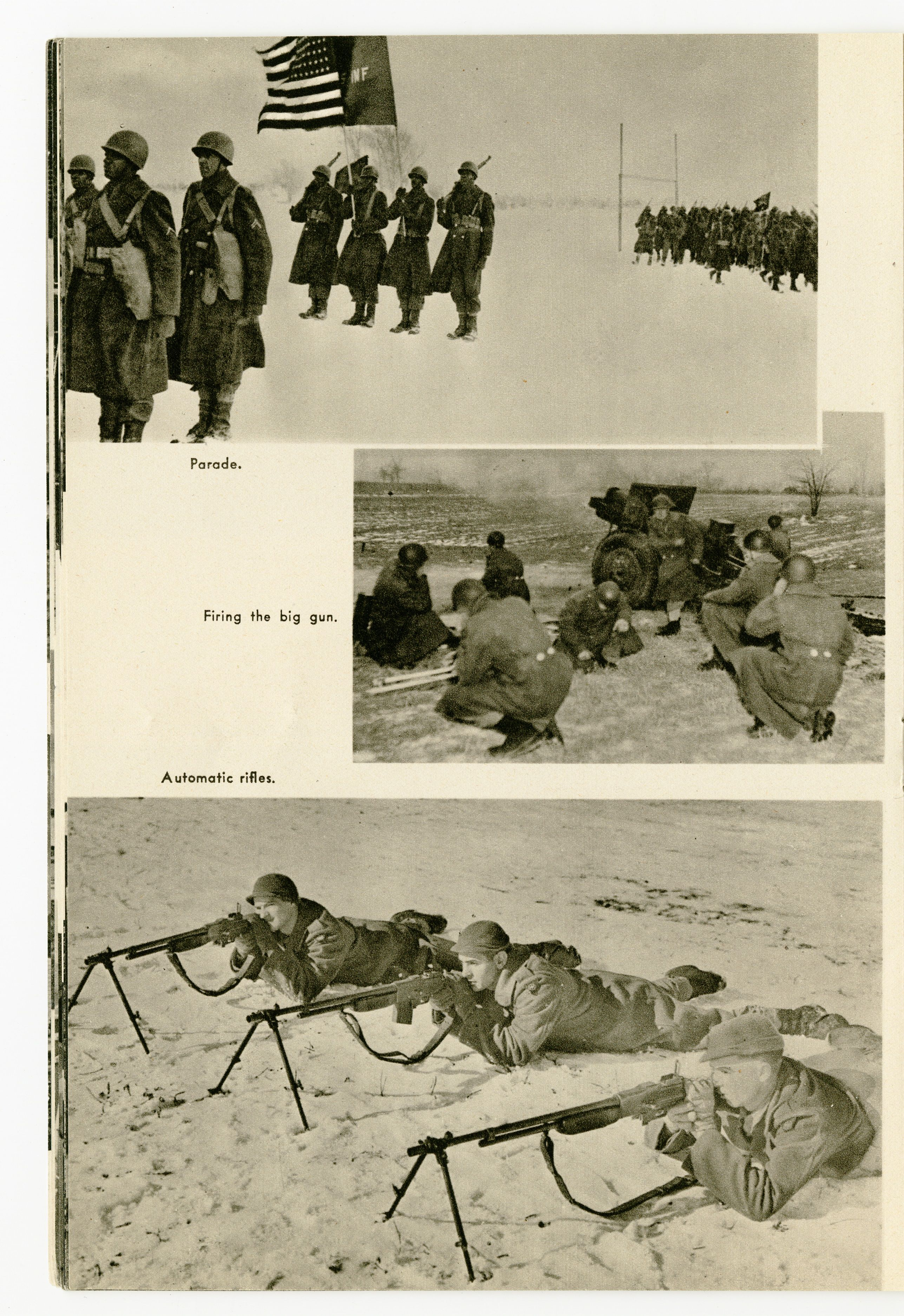

In 1942 the U.S. Army's 83rd Division, under the command of Major General John C. Milliken, was the first infantry division to arrive for training at Camp Atterbury. Reactivated on 15 August 1942, the division and its auxiliary units later grew to include about 25,000 service personnel. In March 1943 the 83rd established a U.S. Army Ranger training school at the camp. The division left Camp Atterbury in June 1943 for further training in Tennessee and Kentucky before shipping out to England and the European Theater of Operations in April 1944.

The 365th Infantry Regiment and the 597th Field Artillery Battery, two units of the 92nd Division, under the command of Colonel Walter A. Elliott, were reactivated at Camp Atterbury on 15 October 1942. Composed of African American servicemen, the two units remained at the camp until 26 April 1943, when they joined the remaining 92nd Division forces at Fort Huachuca, Arizona. The 92nd sailed for North Africa in June 1944, and served in the Mediterranean Theater of Operations.

The 30th "Old Hickory" Division, under the command of Major General Leland S. Hobbs, arrived on 13 November 1943, for a ten-week stay at the camp. The division left on 30 January 1944, for Massachusetts, and sailed to England in February 1944.

The 106th "Golden Lion" Division, under the command of Major General Alan W. Jones, arrived at Camp Atterbury in March 1944 and left on 9 October 1944. The 106th Division, the largest to train at Camp Atterbury, was sent to the Ardennes, where it was forced to surrender in the Battle of the Bulge in December 1944.

Numerous auxiliary and service units also trained at Camp Atterbury, including some of the units from the Eighth Detachment, Special Troops, Second Army, which was under the command of Colonel Richard C. Stickney. Medical units also trained at Wakeman Hospital and practiced in the field. Another unit, the U.S. 39th Evacuation Hospital, under the command of Lieutenant Colonel Allen N. Bracher, was activated on 30 August 1942, and departed from Camp Atterbury on 7 June 1943, for Tennessee. It was sent overseas in March 1944. The 101st Infantry Battalion (Separate) under the command of Colonel Vincent Conrad, arrived at the camp in December 1942. It was given the nickname of the Austrian battalion because some of its members were political refugees from Austria, including three archdukes (Felix, Carl Ludwig, and Rudolf), who were the sons of Charles I of Austria and the brothers of Otto von Habsburg. A few months later, when the battalion was disbanded in 1943, its members were reassigned.

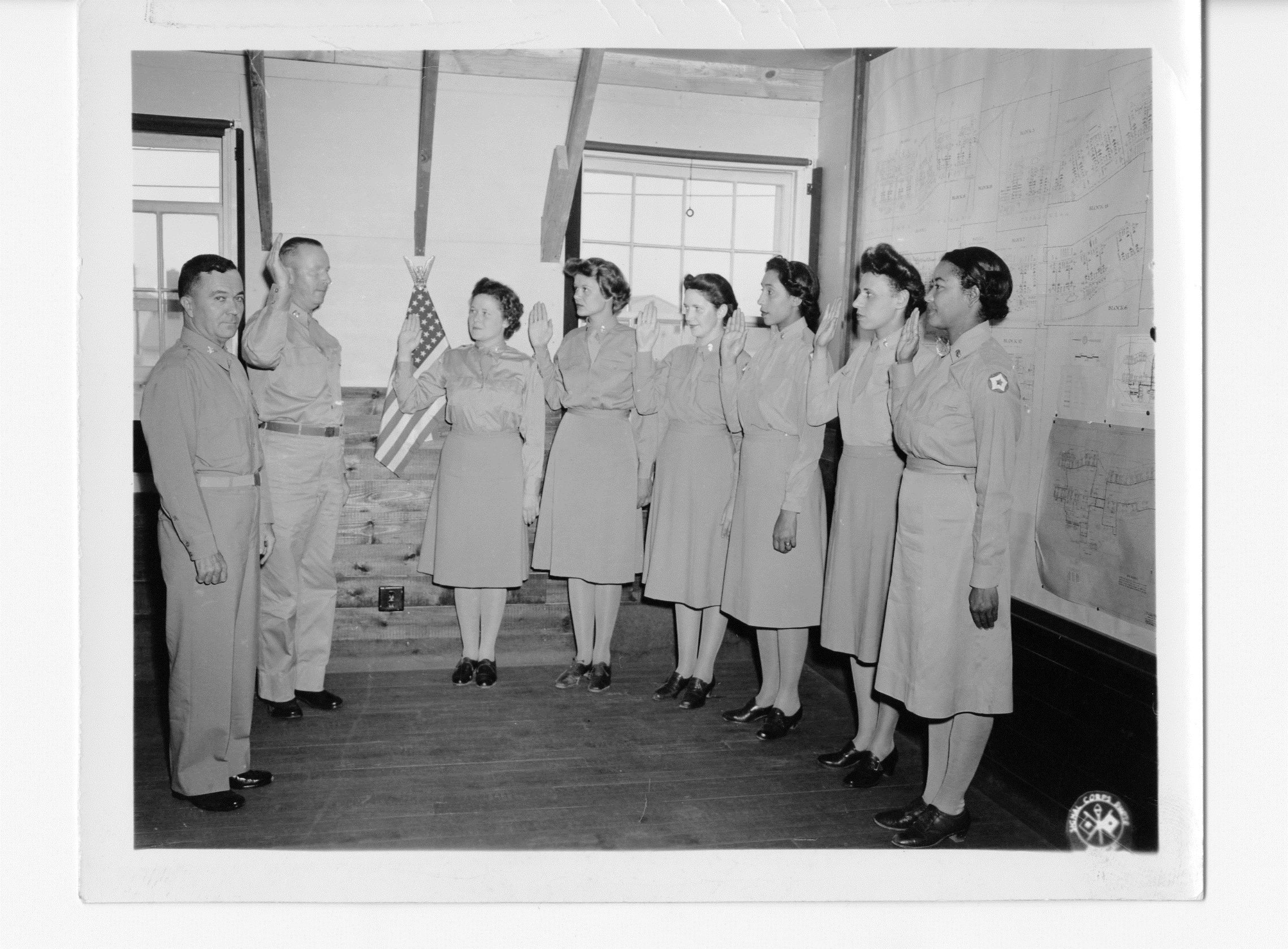
WAC officers sworn in at Camp Atterbury on August 27, 1943.

The 1584th Special Training Unit (renamed the 1560th SCU Special Training Unit in February 1944) provided academic training for military personnel at the camp beginning in November 1943. The 1562nd operated a school to train bakers and cooks for military service.

In 1942 Indiana officials reported that the camp would receive Women's Army Auxiliary Corps personnel to serve in various capacities at the camp. (The WAACs became known as the Women's Army Corps, or WACs, on 15 May 1942.) Facilities were erected for their use in a separate block of buildings, away from the other service personnel. Similar in construction to others at the camp, the women's buildings included barracks, mess halls, an administrative building, and recreational facilities. The first contingent of 130 women arrived at Camp Atterbury on 6 March 1943, from a training center at Daytona Beach, Florida. This all-white group served as the 44th Headquarters Company, under the command of Second Officer Helen C. Grote, who had trained at Fort Des Moines Provisional Army Officer Training School in Des Moines, Iowa. (The 44th Post Headquarters Company was renamed the Headquarters Section of the 3561st Service Unit on 21 June 1943.) Another contingent of 141 women arrived at the camp on 22 May 1943, under the command of Second Officer Sarah E. Murphy. This all-black group of WACs performed duties at Wakeman Hospital as part of the 3561st Service Unit and cared for wounded soldiers returning from combat.

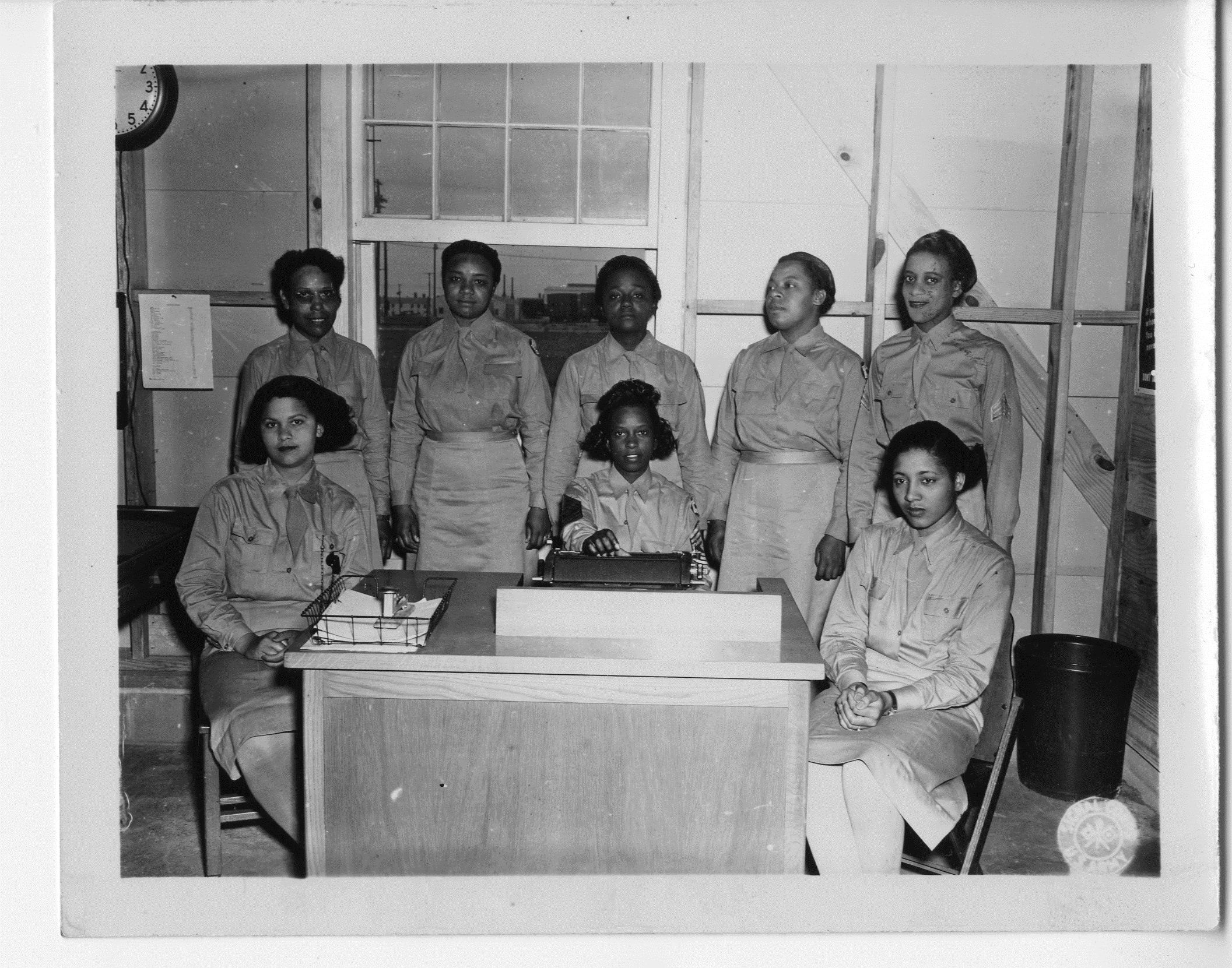
Members of the enlisted administrative force of the Medical Section, 3561st Service Unit of the Women's Army Auxiliary Corps (WAAC), at Camp Atterbury, June 22, 1943.

=== Camp newspapers and radio stations ===
Camp Atterbury established its own newspaper during the war. The first issue of The Atterbury Crier was published on 25 September 1942. The name of the free publication was subsequently changed to The Camp Crier, with its first issue published on 5 March 1943. Wakeman General's publication, The Probe, was combined with the camp's general newspaper in January 1946. The last issue of The Camp Crier was published on 14 June 1946. In addition to the camp newspaper, some of the individual units published their own mimeographed newsletters under names such as The Jerk, The Buzz Saw, The Fighter, The Wardier, and a Wakeman Hospital newsletter called The Splint and Litter, among others.

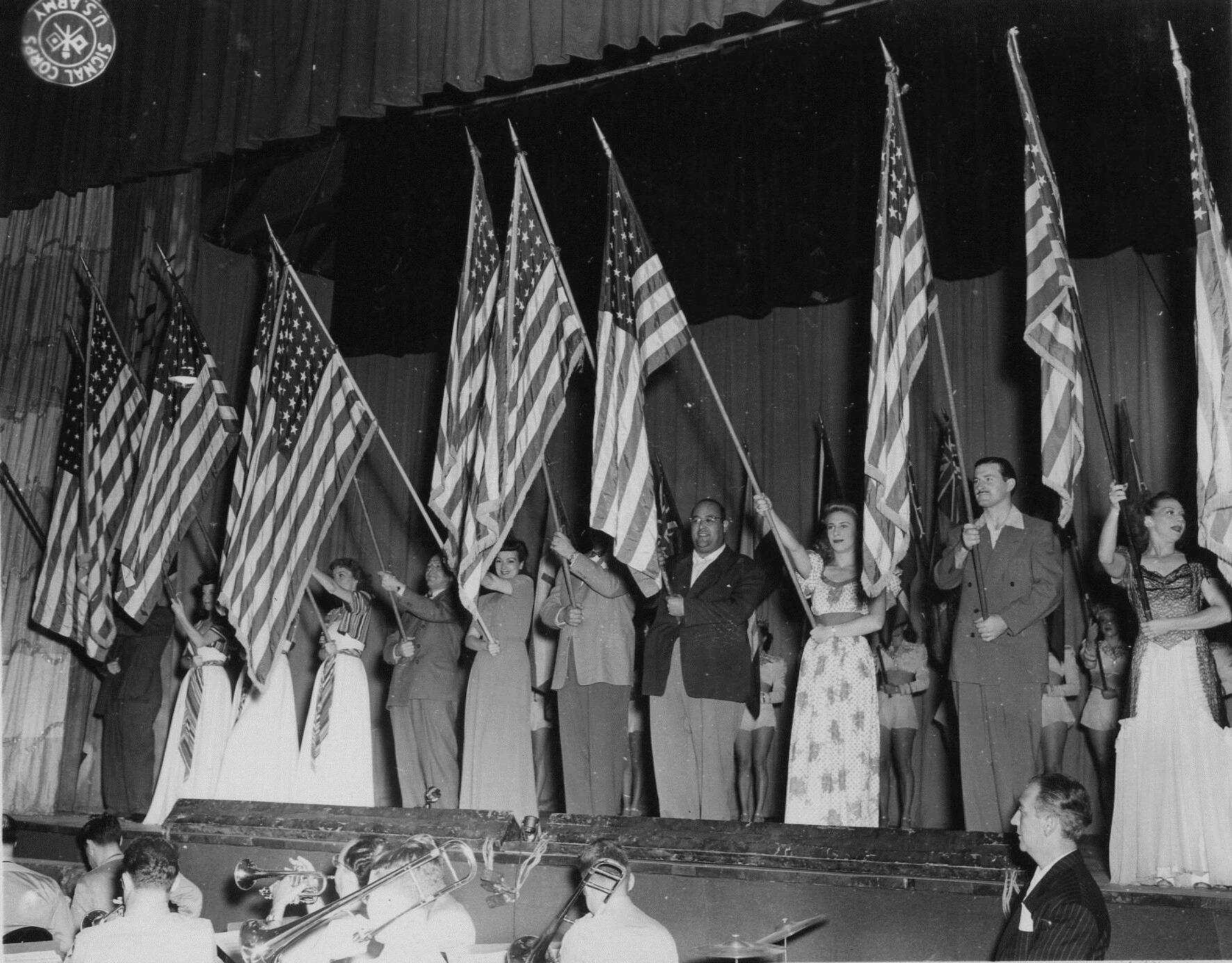
USO show "Hellzapoppin" at Camp Atterbury, June 30, 1943

Wakeman Hospital also had its own radio station, WAKE. Camp Atterbury's first wartime, all-soldiers radio show, called "It's Time For Taps," aired from Indianapolis on Thursday, 8 October 1942, at 1310 AM kHz.

=== Internment camp ===
From 30 April 1943, to 26 June 1946, a portion of Camp Atterbury was enclosed with a double barbed-wire fence and surrounded by guard towers for use as a prisoner-of-war camp. Administered under the terms of the Geneva Convention of 1929, the internment camp was one of 700 established in the United States. Over the three years and two months of its operation, the internment camp received an estimated 15,000 soldiers, most of them Italian and German. During its operation there were seventeen prisoner deaths, but no escapes. The internment camp was closed in June 1946 and dismantled. In 1970 the remains of the prisoners who died at Camp Atterbury were exhumed from the POW cemetery at the camp and moved to Camp Butler National Cemetery, near Springfield, Illinois.

Located on 45 acres (0.18 km^{2}) on the extreme western edge of Camp Atterbury, about 1 mile (1.6 km) from the camp's regular troops, the internment camp included separate compounds for the prisoners within a stockade. Its facilities were intended to house and feed up to 3,000 the prisoners at a time. Seriously injured prisoners were treated at Wakeman Hospital. On 15 December 1942, the U.S. Army activated the 1537th Service Unit to perform duty at the prison camp. After receiving specialized training, the service unit arrived in February 1943 to prepare for the arrival of the prisoners of war. For the duration of its use, the internment camp was under the command of Lieutenant Colonel John L. Gammell. Father Maurice F. Imhoff, a Roman Catholic priest, was assigned as the camp's chaplain.

The prison compound was equipped similarly to Camp Atterbury's other facilities; however, the U.S. Army service unit was housed outside the perimeter of the internment camp. Prisoners were organized into three battalions and the camp was divided into three sections. They worked as general camp laborers and at offsite locations, usually as agricultural laborers in groups of ten or more, accompanied by a military guard. Prisoners were paid eighty cents per day for their labor, in addition to a ten-cent per diem from the U.S. government. They were also allowed leisure time at the camp.

The first group of 767 prisoners, most of them Italians, arrived on 30 April 1943, and another group of 400 arrived the following day. By September there were nearly 3,000 prisoners at the camp. All the Italian prisoners had been removed from Camp Atterbury by 4 May 1944.

In 1943 Lieutenant Colonel John Gammel gave the Italian prisoners permission to erect a small chapel about 1 mile (1.6 km) from the internment compound. Dedicated to the Blessed Mother, it was named "The Chapel in the Meadow." The three-sided structure, which measured 11 feet (3.4 m) by 16 feet (4.9 m), was built of brick and stucco from scrap materials found at the camp. The exterior had bright blue stucco walls and plain white columns. A cross surmounted the south end of its gable roof. The east and west sidewalls each had an opening in the shape of a cross. Its interior was decorated with a faux-painted marble altar installed at the back. Another altar was built for outdoor use. Religious paintings decorated the interior walls and ceiling.

The "Chapel in the Meadow" was not demolished when the internment was dismantled, but it fell into disrepair and was vandalized after the war. The chapel was restored and dedicated in 1989. It is the only extant structure from the prisoner-of-war compound. Camp Atterbury's former prisoners and their descendants have returned to the site for annual reunions. In 2017 the Indiana Historical Society re-created a replica of the chapel for its exhibit, "You Are There 1943: Italian POWs at Atterbury," which runs from 4 April 2017, through 11 August 2018, at the Eugene and Marilyn Glick Indiana History Center in downtown Indianapolis.

In addition to the chapel, the Italian prisoners left behind two stone-carved memorials that are still at the camp. A large stone that rests inside the camp's east entrance carries the inscription: "Camp Atterbury–1942". The Italians also carved a commemorative stone with the inscription: "Atterbury Internment Camp, 1537th S. U., 12-15-42," in reference to the U.S. unit in charge of the prison compound. This stone lies within the perimeter of the former internment camp.

After the departure of the last Italian prisoners on 4 May, another group of prisoners of war, most of them German, began arriving on 8 May 1944. About 5,700 were housed at the camp by September. When the internment camp exceeded its capacity, some of the German prisoners were relocated. By October the number of German prisoners had reached 8,898. An estimated 3,700 of them were housed in satellite camps in other areas of Indiana, where they were closer to the communities who needed them for labor. German prisoners primarily worked as agricultural laborers, as the Italian prisoners had done, but they were especially needed for work at area canning factories. The last German prisoners of war to leave Wakeman Hospital departed on 28 June 1946, for New Jersey.

=== Reception and separation centers ===
In August 1944 the reception (induction) center at Fort Benjamin Harrison, northeast of Indianapolis, was moved to Camp Atterbury, where it was organized as a separate unit in October 1944. U.S. Army inductees stayed in camp about a week before their transfer to a training center. About 9,000 inductees per month passed through Camp Atterbury's reception center before its operations were moved to Fort Knox at the end of 1946. In addition to the inductees, about 3,000 military personnel who were awaiting reassignment passed through Camp Atterbury's reception station, organized as a separate unit in November 1944. Military personnel arriving at the reception station usually stayed twelve to twenty-four hours before they were sent home or reassigned to other duties after a brief furlough. By September 1945 the reception station was processing about 60,000 returning soldiers per month. It closed on 31 July 1946.

Camp Atterbury's separation center, organized as a separate unit at the camp in October 1944, was one of eighteen facilities in the United States that was responsible for handling U.S. Army discharges. Shortly after Victory over Japan Day in August 1945, Brigadier General Ernest Aaron Bixby, the camp's commanding officer, announced that its huge receiving and separation centers (the U.S. Army's second-largest separation center during World War II) were discharging a daily average of 1,000 U.S. Army troops with sufficient points (85 points or more) or qualifying dependency.

On 12 December 1945, Camp Atterbury discharged 2,971 soldiers, its highest number on a single day up to that date. On 2 August 1946, the last U.S. Army soldier to be processed and discharged at Camp Atterbury was Technical Sergeant Joseph J. "Joe" Stuphar of Poland, Ohio. The induction and separation center officially closed on 2 August 1946; however, about 10,000 military and civilian personnel remained at Camp Atterbury to keep the reception center, military police activities, and Wakeman General Hospital in operation. A total of 537,344 enlisted men and 39,495 officers were discharged from military service at Camp Atterbury's separation center during the war.

=== Deactivation and closure ===
The U.S. Army suspended operations at Camp Atterbury on 4 August 1946 and the War Department proceeded with plans to transfer Wakeman Hospital's remaining patients to other hospitals. The first public announcement that the induction and separation center at the camp would close was made on 10 May 1946. On 18 September 1946, after the U.S. War Department announced that Wakeman Hospital would be declared surplus by 31 December, Indiana governor Ralph F. Gates reported from his office in Indianapolis that the hospital might be used after the first of the year as a temporary state mental hospital until the construction of the new northern Indiana mental hospital was completed. However, after Camp Atterbury and Wakeman Hospital were deactivated in December 1946, the Indiana National Guard established its headquarters at the site. Camp Atterbury remained on stand-by status until 1950, when it was reactivated as a military training center.

=== Korean War: The Camp That Died Twice ===
At the onset of the Korean War, Camp Atterbury was reactivated with the arrival of the 28th Infantry Division on 14 September 1950, in a 450-vehicle convoy. The 28th Division left the camp in November 1951. The 31st Infantry Division also trained at Camp Atterbury. When it departed for Camp Carson, Colorado, in 1954, operations were suspended at Camp Atterbury and it was once again deactivated.

=== Indiana National Guard Installation: Modern Camp Atterbury ===
Camp Atterbury remained dormant until the 1960s. On 31 December 1968, the U.S. Army discontinued its use as a federal military installation. The Indiana National Guard assumed oversight of the camp in January 1969. From the 1970s through the 1990s, the camp supported the Indiana National Guard and its missions during the Vietnam War, Operation Desert Shield, and the Gulf War's Operation Desert Storm.

Originally encompassing about 40,352 acres (163.30 km^{2}) the military training site has been reduced to approximately 30,000 acres (120 km^{2}). During the 1960s the Indiana Department of Natural Resources leased more than 6,000 acres (24 km^{2}) of land within Camp Atterbury to establish the Atterbury State Fish and Wildlife Area. Other acreage has been leased to the Atterbury Job Corps, the U.S. Department of Labor, the Johnson County, Indiana Parks Department, and Hoosier Park.

The installation also gained importance following the September 11, 2001 attacks, when it served as a National Guard training facility. The Camp Atterbury Joint Maneuver Training Center (CAJMTC) was activated in February 2003. Since 2003 thousands of regular and reserve forces have trained at the camp prior to their deployment to Afghanistan, Iraq, Kosovo and other locations around the world. Camp Atterbury is one of two National Guard bases with this mission; Camp Shelby in Mississippi is the other. Since 2009 Camp Atterbury has also trained thousands of civilians from the Inter-Agency and U.S. Department of Defense in the "DoD Civilian Expeditionary Workforce" program as they prepare to mobilize in support of stability operations in Iraq, Afghanistan, and Kuwait.

=== Acquisition of Muscatatuck ===
In July 2005, Camp Atterbury's size was increased an estimated 1,000 acres (4.0 km^{2}) after it obtained the Muscatatuck State Development Center, a former state mental facility founded in the 1920s. The site included sixty-eight buildings, an 180-acre (0.73 km^{2}) reservoir, a submerged neighborhood, an extensive tunnel system, and many other features. Renamed Muscatatuck Urban Training Center (MUTC), it was acquired with the intention of converting it into the Department of Defense's premier urban training center.

=== 2008 tornado ===
On 3 June 2008, a tornado hit Camp Atterbury, damaging an estimated forty buildings. Two injuries were reported. Despite the estimated multimillion-dollar damage to the camp, training continued for more than 2,000 troops, including a U.S. Marine unit that was at the site during the tornado outbreak. Four days later, the National Guard and U.S. Marines at Camp Atterbury were utilized in response to the June 2008 Midwest floods.

=== Expansion ===
In April 2010 plans were announced to reclaim an estimated 1,200 acres (4.9 km^{2}) of land for construction of Indiana National Guard offices, barracks, and other facilities. Since then, Camp Atterbury has reclaimed a portion of its old borders north of Hospital Road. The North Cantonment Area includes state-of-the art barracks, dining facilities, a fire station, and training areas. While the old grounds of Wakeman Hospital and several other northern training areas are still owned by Johnson County or the Atterbury Fish and Wildlife Area, Camp Atterbury hopes to return to its original 1942 borders.

=== 2021 Afghan evacuees ===
Upon the ending of the War in Afghanistan (2001–2021), Camp Atterbury was home to around 7,500 Afghan refugees in Operation Allies Welcome (OAW). The first 1,000 refugees arrived on September 1, 2021. The refugees included American citizens, Afghan allies who helped in the American military effort, and those deemed vulnerable Afghans by the U.S. Government. The last Afghan refugees would leave the camp by mid-2022. According to officials, "the refugees include American citizens, Afghan allies who helped in the military effort, and those deemed vulnerable Afghans by the U.S. government."

=== Support of Ukraine ===
Following the Russian invasion of Ukraine in February 2022, by April, Camp Atterbury prepared M113 armored vehicles and other equipment for shipment to Ukraine.

== Modern operations ==
=== Camp Atterbury ===
A Squad Leader in Provincial Reconstruction Team Kapisa briefs the mission to his squad before training to respond to IED attacks at Camp Atterbury

An LAV-25 conducting gunnery at Camp Atterbury (0:35)
A Co, 4th Bn, 68th Armor Reg of the 1st BCT, 82nd ABN DIV conducts live fire qualifications with LAV-25A2s at the Maneuver Live Fire Gunnery Range (2019)

Today, Camp Atterbury Joint Maneuver Training Center (CAJMTC) provides training and testing support to Army National Guard (ARNG), Active, Reserve and Joint Forces as a proposed Regional Collective Training Capability (RCTC) installation, provides users with state-of-the-art multi-domain training opportunities, and serves as a Primary Mobilization Force Generation Installation (pMFGI) as identified by United States Army Forces Command (FORSCOM). CAJMTC consists of approximately 26,000 acres of maneuver training space, a 6,000-acre impact area, urban training venues, and an approximately 3,000-acre cantonment area. It offers a variety of training ranges, live-fire venues, managed airspace with air-to-ground firing capabilities and an LVC simulation and exercise center. CAIN has secure facilities, simulations, ranges, configurable classrooms and conference spaces to provide users with experiences that are versatile and mission specific. The facility combines a walking campus, new barracks complex and multiple life support features to units conducting large-scale training and pre-operational testing. It also hosts the Indiana Air Range Complex.

=== Regional Training Institute ===
HQ 138th Regiment (Combat Arms) Indiana Regional Training Institute (RTI) provides regionalized combat arms individual training, including Military Occupational Specialty (MOS) Qualification (MOSQ), Additional Skill Identifiers (ASIs), and Non-Commissioned Officer (NCO) Education System (NCOES) training as part of the One Army School System. Additionally, the Indiana RTI conducts a fully accredited Warrant Officer Candidate School (WOCS), Officer Candidate School (OCS), US Army Combat Medic, MOS 68W Sustainment Course and Combat Lifesaver Course. The Indiana RTI, along with other Camp Atterbury units, supports the National Deployment Center (NDC) in training civilians for future deployments.

=== Joint Simulation Training Exercise Center ===
The JSTEC provides space capable of supporting large-scale exercises, major simulations, mobilizations, homeland security training and other large training events. The facility consists of eight buildings comprising approximately 80,000 sq. ft. of indoor training space. The 25,000 sq. ft. main building serves as the exercise control space for major simulations exercises. The remaining buildings are flexible and configurable to meet individual unit training needs. The facility has ample command post pads that are digitally connected to the simulations network infrastructure and can support multiple divisions and brigades simultaneously. In addition to a robust network protected distribution system for classified exercises, the site has a dedicated JTEN 2.0 node which allows digital connectivity to exercises throughout the world.

=== Atterbury Rail Deployment Center ===
The Atterbury Rail Deployment Facility (ARDF) or "railhead" has the ability to load/unload a Brigade Combat Team in 72 hours, can handle 120 rail cars per day, and serves a vital part in mobilization and expeditionary operations for all units in the Midwest.

=== Muscatatuck Training Center ===
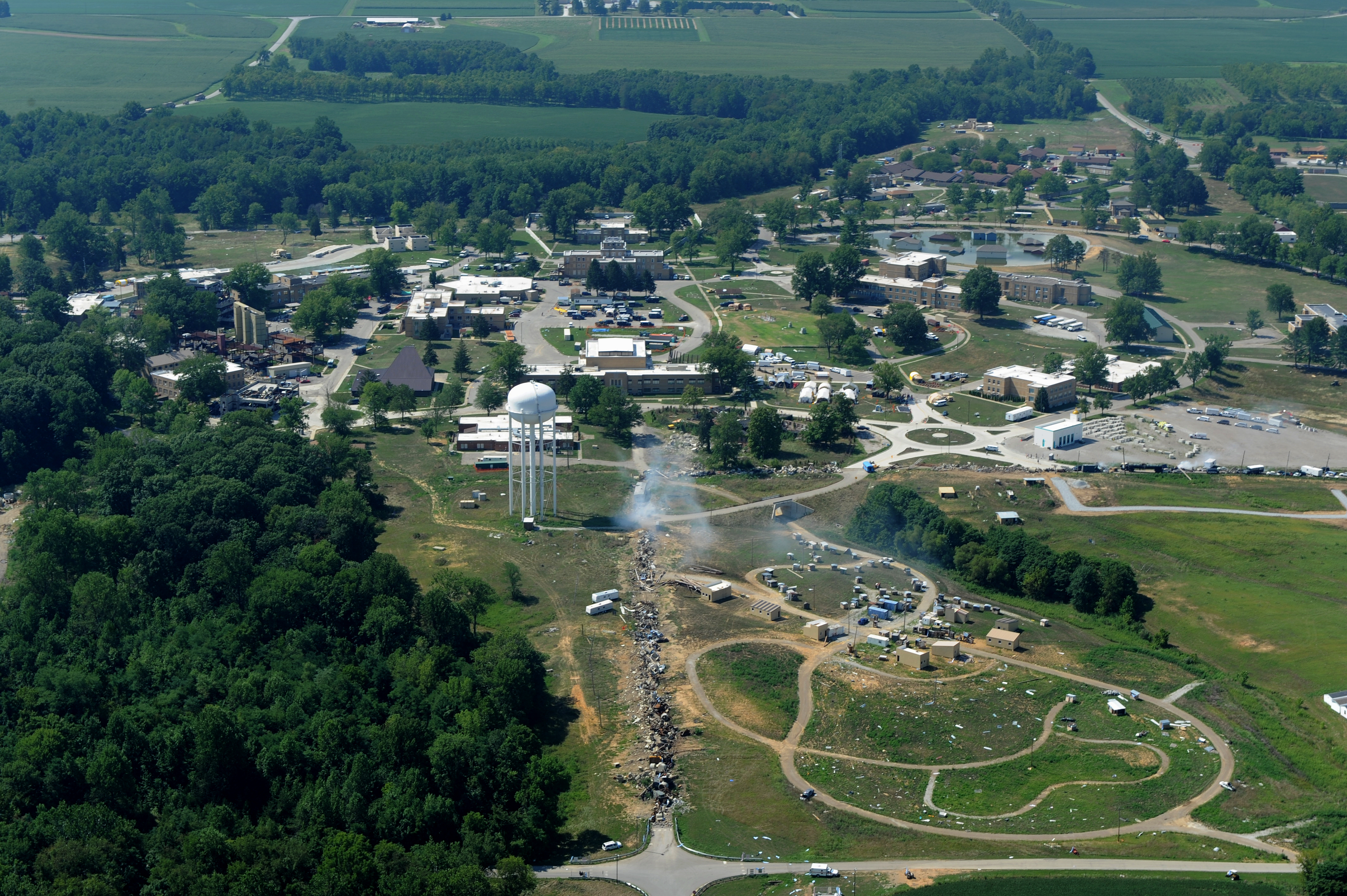
Muscatatuck Urban Training Center

Muscatatuck (MuTC) offers users a globally unique, urban and rural, multi-domain operating environment that is recognized as the Department of Defense's (DoD's) largest and most realistic urban training facility serving those who work in national defense. It consists of a city that includes a built physical infrastructure, a well-integrated cyber-physical environment, an electromagnetic effects system and human elements. Since its acquisition in 2005, Muscatatuck has been converted into a multi-domain environment that includes a physical metropolitan infrastructure, a 1,000-acre urban and rural landscape with more than 190 brick-and-mortar structures with roughly 1.5 million square feet under roof, 1.8 miles of subterranean tunnels, a cave complex, more than nine miles of roads, managed airspace, a 185-acre reservoir, and a cyber live-fire range. The Cyber Training Center is capable of supporting live offensive and defensive operations for all three tenants of Multi-Domain Operations (MDO) at any echelon through LVC training platforms. This integrated MDO environment touches the 21st Century battlefield domains of land, air, maritime, cyberspace and space and includes the electromagnetic spectrum and information environment. As users regularly add role-players to create dense urban terrain (DUT), the unpredictable realism slows operations while increasing the speed and complexity of tactical engagements.

=== Indiana Air Range Complex ===
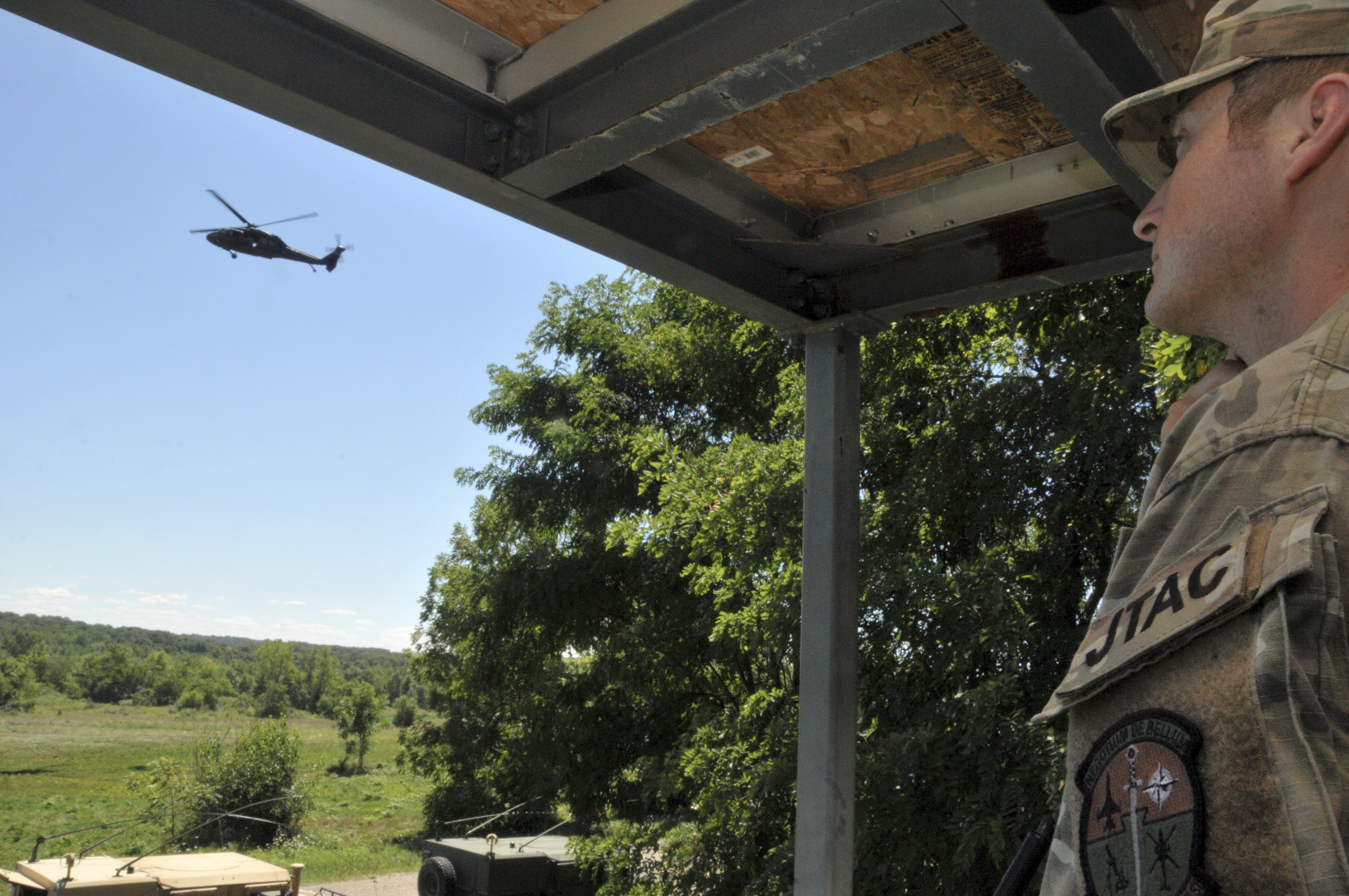
Joint Terminal Attack Controller from the 113th Air Support Operations Squadron communicates with Forward Observers from 1-150th Aviation during Exercise Northern Strike

The Indiana Air Range Complex (IARC) enables training and testing activities utilizing special use and managed airspace supporting both kinetic and non-kinetic air-to-ground operations. It consists of Camp Atterbury, Muscatatuck Urban Training Center and Jefferson Range and the supporting associated special-use airspace. The IARC supports unmanned aerial systems (UAS), Close Air Support training and two Indiana Air National Guard Wings, co-located on civilian airports.

== See also ==
Bakalar Air Force Base (formerly Atterbury Army Air Base)
