= Petersville, Indiana =

- Unincorporated community and Census-designated place
- Bartholomew County's location in Indiana

- Location in Bartholomew County
- Coordinates: 39°13′35″N 85°49′09″W
- Country: United States
- State: Indiana
- County: Bartholomew
- Township: Clay
- Elevation: 656 ft (200 m)
- Time zone: UTC-5 (Eastern (EST))
  - Summer (DST): UTC-4 (EDT)
- ZIP code: 47203
- FIPS code: 18-59400
- GNIS feature ID: 2830315

Petersville is an unincorporated community in Clay Township, Bartholomew County, in the U.S. state of Indiana.

== History ==
A post office was established at Petersville in 1873, and remained in operation until it was discontinued in 1900. The community was named for its founder, Peter T. Blessing.

== Demographics ==
The United States Census Bureau designated Petersville as a census designated place in the 2022 American Community Survey.
