= International School of Columbus =

Location
- Columbus, Indiana; United States
- 39°11′55″N 85°53′26″W

Information
- Type: Public Charter school High School Middle School
- Motto: Give Them The World
- Established: 2009
- Closed: 2013
- Principal: Jonah Sims
- Colors: Blue, White, Green
- Mascot: Jaguar
- Website: International School of Columbus

The International School of Columbus (ISC) was a free, public, Charter school located in Columbus, Indiana. It was founded in 2009. It was an International Baccalaureate World School. It taught grades 7−12. The International School of Columbus was open to any students living in Indiana.

The International School of Columbus is a college prep school. It offers the International Baccalaureate that students can choose to go for in their 11th and 12th grade years. The International School of Columbus excels in Science Olympiad each year. The International School of Columbus had its first graduation in 2013.

== Faculty ==
The principal of ISC was Jonah Sims. Sims was named one of the 2013 20 Under 40.

== Student body ==
The International School of Columbus currently has 132 students during the 2012–13 school year. The student body is reflective of the entire community and is 86% white, 4% Asian, 4% Multiracial, 3% African American, and 3% Hispanic. ISC students on average score 2.8 percentage points above the state average on ISTEPexams. ISC students on average score 8.9 percentage points above the state average in Indiana End-of-Course Assessments (ECAs). In 2012 all 15 students that took the Algebra 1 ECA passed.

== School trips ==
The International School of Columbus takes 2 major school field trips each year. One of them is a regional field trip, the other an international field trip. The International School of Columbus has visited,

- Gettysburg, Pennsylvania
- St. Louis, Missouri
- Sharpsburg, Maryland (Antietam)
- Costa Rica
- Machu Picchu

== Shutdown ==
On October 21, 2013, the International School of Columbus announced that they would be forced to close due to lack of proper funding. They gave students the rest of the week to transition to other schools smoothly, and then officially closed their doors on October 25, 2013.
