= Rosstown, Indiana =

- Unincorporated community
- Bartholomew County's location in Indiana

- Location in Bartholomew County
- Coordinates: 39°06′33″N 85°55′46″W
- Country: United States
- State: Indiana
- County: Bartholomew
- Township: Wayne
- Elevation: 630 ft (190 m)
- Time zone: UTC-5 (Eastern (EST))
  - Summer (DST): UTC-4 (EDT)
- ZIP code: 47201
- FIPS code: 18-66132
- GNIS feature ID: 442328

Rosstown is an unincorporated community in Wayne Township, Bartholomew County, in the U.S. state of Indiana.
