= Wayne Township, Bartholomew County, Indiana =

Wayne Township
- Township
- Location in Bartholomew County
- Coordinates: 39°05′44″N 85°56′08″W
- Country: United States
- State: Indiana
- County: Bartholomew

Government
  - Type: Indiana township

Area
  - Total: 49.23 sq mi (127.5 km^{2})
  - Land: 48.91 sq mi (126.7 km^{2})
  - Water: 0.31 sq mi (0.80 km^{2}) 0.63%
- Elevation: 617 ft (188 m)

Population (2020)
  - Total: 3,835
  - Density: 78/sq mi (30/km^{2})
- ZIP codes: 47201, 47247, 47274
- GNIS feature ID: 0454028

Wayne Township is one of twelve townships in Bartholomew County, Indiana, United States. As of the 2010 census, its population was 3,815 and it contained 1,492 housing units.

== Geography ==
According to the 2010 census, the township has a total area of 49.23 square miles (127.5 km^{2}), of which 48.91 square miles (126.7 km^{2}) (or 99.35%) is land and 0.31 square miles (0.80 km^{2}) (or 0.63%) is water.

=== Cities, towns, villages ===
- Columbus (south edge)
- Jonesville

=== Unincorporated towns and census-designated places ===
- Bethel Village CDP
- Mineral Springs
- Rosstown
- Walesboro
- Waynesville

=== Adjacent townships ===
- Columbus Township (north)
- Sand Creek Township (east)
- Redding Township, Jackson County (southeast)
- Hamilton Township, Jackson County (southwest)
- Jackson Township (west)
- Ohio Township (west)
- Harrison Township (northwest)

=== Cemeteries ===
The township contains Daugherty Cemetery.

=== Major highways ===
- Interstate 65
- Indiana State Road 11

=== Rivers ===
- White River

== Churches ==
- St. John's Lutheran Church, White Creek, IN

== School districts ==
- Bartholomew Consolidated School Corporation

== Political districts ==
- Indiana's 9th congressional district
- State House District 65
- State Senate District 41
