= Bartholomew County, Indiana =

County in Indiana, United States

- County
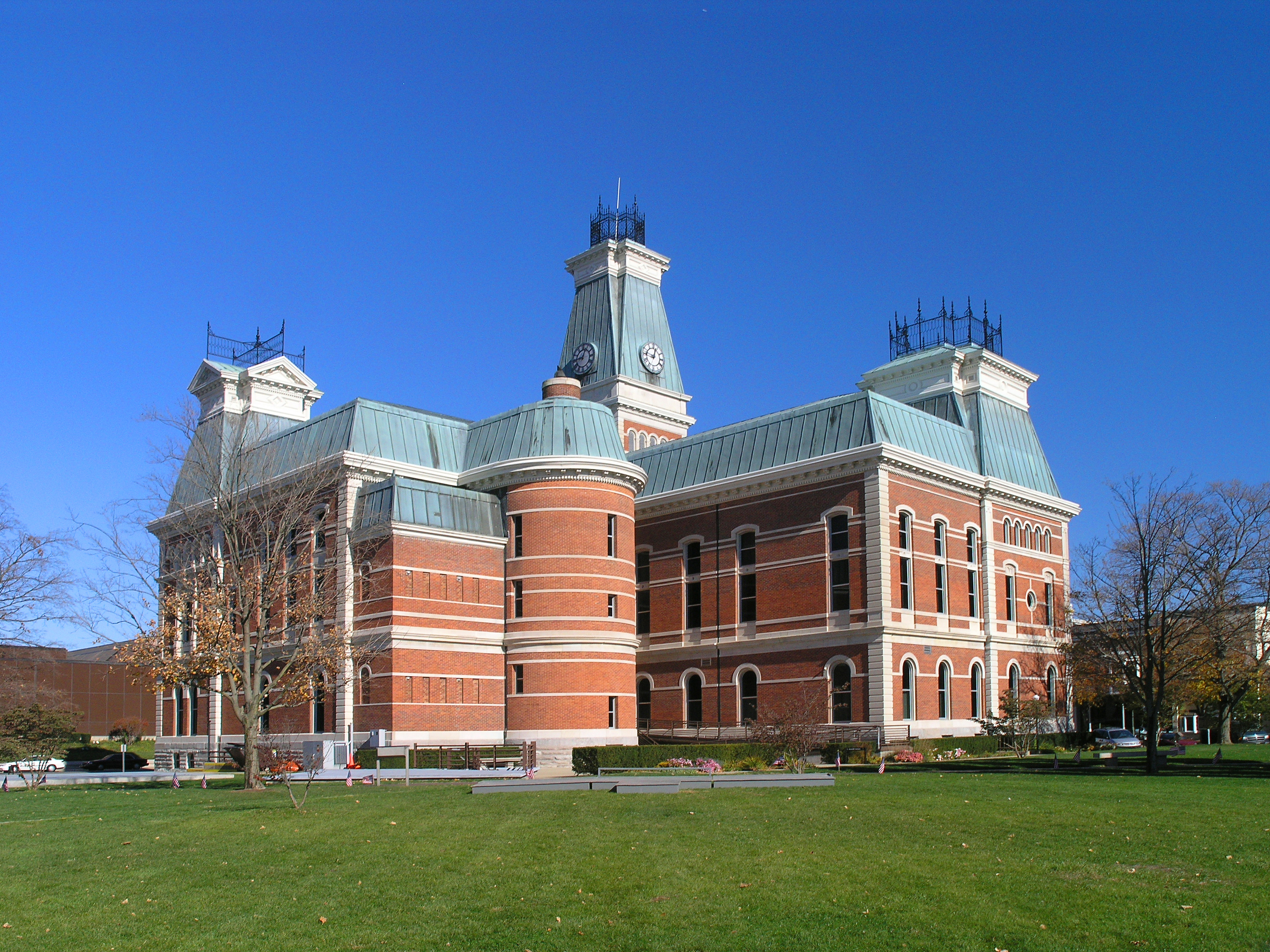
- The Bartholomew County Courthouse in Columbus

- Flag Seal

- Location within the U.S. state of Indiana
- Coordinates: 39°13′N 85°54′W
- Country: United States
- State: Indiana
- Founded: February 12, 1821
- Named for: Joseph Bartholomew
- Seat: Columbus
- Largest city: Columbus

Area
  - Total: 409.52 sq mi (1,060.7 km^{2})
  - Land: 406.91 sq mi (1,053.9 km^{2})
  - Water: 2.62 sq mi (6.8 km^{2}) 0.64%

Population (2020)
  - Total: 82,208
  - Estimate (2025): 85,729 ▲
  - Density: 202.03/sq mi (78.004/km^{2})
- Time zone: UTC−5 (Eastern)
  - Summer (DST): UTC−4 (EDT)
- Congressional districts: 6th, 9th
- Website: www.bartholomew.in.gov
- Indiana county number 3

Bartholomew County is a county located in the U.S. state of Indiana. The population was 82,208 at the 2020 census. The county seat is Columbus. The county was determined by the U.S. Census Bureau to be home to the mean center of U.S. population in 1900. Bartholomew County makes up the Columbus, Indiana Metropolitan Statistical Area, which is part of the Indianapolis-Carmel-Muncie Combined Statistical Area.

== History ==
The area now known as Bartholomew County was long populated by indigenous peoples, including the Miami, Potawatomi, and Shawnee. The county is the site of numerous mounds, and human remains dating back as far as 3,000 years have been uncovered in the county. Early settlers recounted the presence of large villages along the various creeks and rivers in the area. The area was within the territory of the Haudenosaunee, and was part of the lands officially ceded to Great Britain in the 1701 Nanfan Treaty. Encroachment by European settlers, contested by indigenous peoples, began in the years after the American Revolutionary War with the 1787 Northwest Ordinance. By then, Delaware people lived in the area. A series of treaties, beginning with the 1804 Treaty with the Piankeshaw, initiated the incorporation of the area into the United States. This process was ended with the 1818 Treaty of St. Mary's, although violent conflict with indigenous peoples was mostly over by 1813 and white settlers had begun to squat on the land by 1816.

Bartholomew County was formed on February 12, 1821, and was named for Lt. Col. Joseph Bartholomew, wounded at the Battle of Tippecanoe. Bartholomew and his fellow officer John Tipton led militia through the county in 1813, and Tipton purchased several parcels in the area in 1820, building a cabin at the confluence of the White and Driftwood rivers. The site of the county seat was chosen on February 15, 1821, by a team of commissioners, who suggested the name Tiptona, in honor of Tipton. In July of the same year, the Legislature renamed Tiptona to Columbus, in honor of Christopher Columbus.

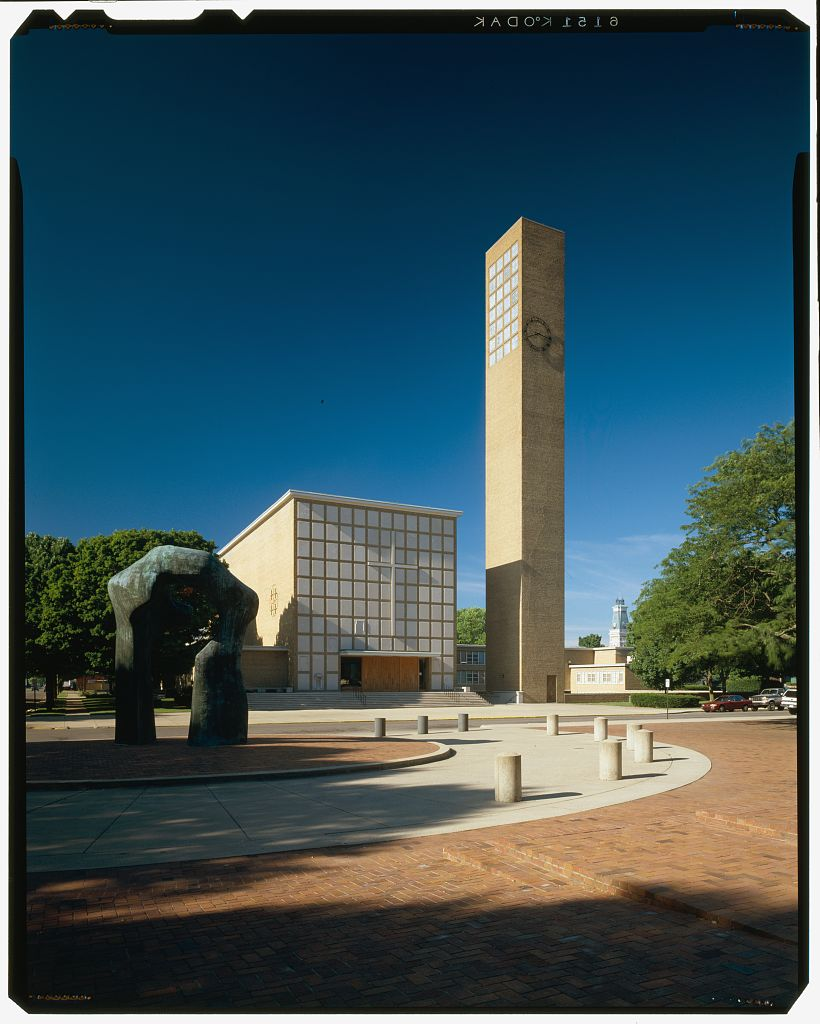
Eilel Saarinen's First Christian Church, shown here with Henry Moore's Large Arch, was one of the first buildings in Columbus built with the support of Cummins' philanthropy

The county's first general store was built in the fall of 1821, and trade routes connecting Columbus with Cincinnati, Indianapolis, Chicago, and Madison were built by 1835. Although indigenous people continued living in Bartholomew County after its formation, they were soon forced out by settlers. A band visited the courthouse in 1830, and Dr. John Beck, an early settler, recounted visits by solitary natives as late as 1839. Mills were built along the Driftwood River following the establishment of trade routes, and the Madison and Indianapolis Railroad began servicing Columbus in 1844. The arrival of the railroad spurred the establishment of local industry in and around Columbus. The current Bartholomew County Courthouse was completed in 1871. Notably, Cummins Inc. was established in Columbus in 1919.

Cummins grew rapidly during and after World War II to become a national, and later global, leader in the production of engines and generators. Under the leadership of J. Irwin Miller, the company sponsored the building of dozens of structures in and around Columbus by eminent architects including I.M. Pei, Eilel and Eero Saarinen, and Harry Weese. Today, the local economy continues to be shaped by the presence of Cummins and other manufacturers. Its built heritage attracts a large number of tourists and architects.

== Geography ==
Map of Bartholomew County

According to the 2010 census, the county has a total area of 409.52 square miles (1,060.7 km^{2}), of which 406.91 square miles (1,053.9 km^{2}) (or 99.36%) is land and 2.62 square miles (6.8 km^{2}) (or 0.64%) is water. Camp Atterbury occupies the northwestern corner of the county.

=== Adjacent counties ===
- Johnson County (northwest)
- Shelby County (northeast)
- Decatur County (east)
- Jennings County (southeast)
- Jackson County (south)
- Brown County (west)

=== City ===
- Columbus

=== Towns ===
- Clifford
- Edinburgh (partial)
- Elizabethtown
- Hartsville
- Hope
- Jonesville

=== Census-designated place ===
- Pleasant View Village
- Taylorsville

=== Other unincorporated places ===
- Azalia
- Bethany
- Burnsville
- Corn Brook
- Everroad Park
- Garden City
- Grammer
- Grandview Lake
- Jewell Village
- Mount Healthy
- Newbern
- North Ogilville
- Nortonburg
- Ogilville
- Old Saint Louis
- Petersville
- Rosstown
- Rugby
- Saint Louis Crossing
- Stony Lonesome
- Walesboro
- Waymansville
- Waynesville

=== Extinct towns ===
- Kansas

=== Townships ===
- Clay
- Clifty
- Columbus
- Flat Rock
- German
- Harrison
- Haw Creek
- Jackson
- Ohio
- Rock Creek
- Sand Creek
- Wayne

=== Transit ===
- ColumBUS

=== Major highways ===
- Interstate 65
- U.S. Route 31
- State Road 7
- State Road 9
- State Road 11
- State Road 46
- State Road 58

=== Airport ===
- KBAK - Columbus Municipal Airport

=== Railroads ===
- Louisville and Indiana Railroad

== Climate and weather ==
Columbus, Indiana

Climate chart (precipitation, max. and min. temperature)
J	F	M	A	M	J	J	A	S	O	N	D
2.7 37 19	2.6 42 22	3.7 53 31	4.4 64 41	4.6 74 52	3.5 83 61	4 86 65	3.8 85 63	3.1 79 55	2.8 67 42	3.8 54 34	3.2 42 25
- █ Average max. and min. temperatures in °F
- █ Precipitation totals in inches
- Source: The Weather Channel
Metric conversion
J	F	M	A	M	J	J	A	S	O	N	D
68 3 −7	67 6 −6	93 12 −1	111 18 5	118 23 11	88 28 16	102 30 18	95 29 17	78 26 13	71 19 6	96 12 1	80 6 −4
- █ Average max. and min. temperatures in °C
- █ Precipitation totals in mm

In recent years, average temperatures in Columbus have ranged from a low of 19 °F (−7 °C) in January to a high of 86 °F (30 °C) in July, although a record low of −27 °F (−33 °C) was recorded in January 1912 and a record high of 111 °F (44 °C) was recorded in July 1934. Average monthly precipitation ranged from 2.63 inches (67 mm) in February to 4.63 inches (118 mm) in May.

== Government ==
Bartholomew County Sheriff's Department

Jurisdictional structure
- Operations jurisdiction: Bartholomew, Indiana, United States
- Legal jurisdiction: As per operations jurisdiction
- General nature: Local civilian police

Operational structure
- Agency executive: Chris Lane, Sheriff

== Politics ==
The county government is a constitutional body, and is granted specific powers by the Constitution of Indiana, and by the Indiana Code.

County Council: The county council is the legislative branch of the county government and controls all the spending and revenue collection in the county. Representatives are elected from county districts. The council members serve four-year terms. They are responsible for setting salaries, the annual budget, and special spending. The council also has limited authority to impose local taxes, in the form of an income and property tax that is subject to state level approval, excise taxes, and service taxes.

Board of Commissioners: The executive body of the county is made of a board of commissioners. The commissioners are elected county-wide, in staggered terms, and each serves a four-year term. One of the commissioners, typically the most senior, serves as president. The commissioners are charged with executing the acts legislated by the council, collecting revenue, and managing the day-to-day functions of the county government.

Court: The county maintains a small claims court that can handle some civil cases. The judge on the court is elected to a term of four years and must be a member of the Indiana Bar Association. The judge is assisted by a constable who is also elected to a four-year term. In some cases, court decisions can be appealed to the state level circuit court.

County Officials: The county has several other elected offices, including sheriff, coroner, auditor, treasurer, recorder, surveyor, and circuit court clerk. Each of these elected officers serves a term of four years and oversees a different part of county government. Members elected to county government positions are required to declare a party affiliation and to be residents of the county.

Bartholomew County is part of Indiana's 6th congressional district and Indiana's 9th congressional district; Indiana Senate district 41; and Indiana House of Representatives districts 57, 59 and 65.

United States presidential election results for Bartholomew County, Indiana
Year	Republican		Democratic		Third party(ies)	
Year	No.	%	No.	%	No.	%
1888	2,742	46.27%	3,109	52.46%	75	1.27%
1892	2,297	40.38%	3,217	56.56%	174	3.06%
1896	3,264	50.03%	3,198	49.02%	62	0.95%
1900	2,375	41.08%	3,300	57.07%	107	1.85%
1904	3,510	51.60%	3,038	44.66%	254	3.73%
1908	3,306	46.13%	3,637	50.75%	224	3.13%
1912	1,321	20.26%	3,147	48.26%	2,053	31.48%
1916	3,287	47.08%	3,441	49.29%	253	3.62%
1920	6,585	53.93%	5,420	44.39%	205	1.68%
1924	6,606	56.62%	4,760	40.80%	302	2.59%
1928	6,788	57.76%	4,881	41.53%	83	0.71%
1932	6,015	43.16%	7,533	54.05%	390	2.80%
1936	6,484	42.92%	8,536	56.50%	87	0.58%
1940	7,890	48.84%	8,180	50.63%	86	0.53%
1944	7,689	50.99%	7,139	47.34%	252	1.67%
1948	7,804	48.74%	7,960	49.71%	248	1.55%
1952	11,462	58.77%	7,844	40.22%	196	1.01%
1956	12,227	59.78%	8,134	39.77%	92	0.45%
1960	13,606	59.09%	9,290	40.35%	130	0.56%
1964	11,026	45.77%	12,940	53.72%	124	0.51%
1968	13,628	55.80%	8,268	33.85%	2,528	10.35%
1972	17,365	70.87%	6,974	28.46%	163	0.67%
1976	14,771	56.41%	11,203	42.78%	213	0.81%
1980	15,801	58.58%	9,260	34.33%	1,913	7.09%
1984	18,704	69.35%	8,075	29.94%	191	0.71%
1988	17,364	66.05%	8,804	33.49%	123	0.47%
1992	13,146	47.91%	8,284	30.19%	6,010	21.90%
1996	13,188	51.60%	9,301	36.39%	3,069	12.01%
2000	16,200	62.87%	9,015	34.98%	554	2.15%
2004	19,093	66.96%	9,191	32.23%	231	0.81%
2008	17,067	54.90%	13,567	43.64%	455	1.46%
2012	18,083	61.52%	10,625	36.15%	684	2.33%
2016	20,640	63.09%	9,841	30.08%	2,236	6.83%
2020	22,410	61.74%	12,934	35.63%	956	2.63%
2024	22,220	62.44%	12,525	35.19%	843	2.37%

== Demographics ==
Historical population
Census	Pop.	Note	%±
1830	5,476		—
1840	10,042		83.4%
1850	12,428		23.8%
1860	17,865		43.7%
1870	21,133		18.3%
1880	22,777		7.8%
1890	23,867		4.8%
1900	24,594		3.0%
1910	24,813		0.9%
1920	23,887		−3.7%
1930	24,864		4.1%
1940	28,276		13.7%
1950	36,108		27.7%
1960	48,198		33.5%
1970	57,022		18.3%
1980	65,088		14.1%
1990	63,657		−2.2%
2000	71,435		12.2%
2010	76,794		7.5%
2020	82,208		7.1%
2025 (est.)	85,729	▲	4.3%
U.S. Decennial Census; 1790-1960 1900-1990; 1990-2000 2010-2013

=== Racial and ethnic composition ===
Bartholomew County, Indiana – Racial and ethnic composition Note: the US Census treats Hispanic/Latino as an ethnic category. This table excludes Latinos from the racial categories and assigns them to a separate category. Hispanics/Latinos may be of any race.
Race / Ethnicity (NH = Non-Hispanic)	Pop 1980	Pop 1990	Pop 2000	Pop 2010	Pop 2020	% 1980	% 1990	% 2000	% 2010	% 2020
White alone (NH)	63,206	61,479	66,422	66,817	64,395	97.11%	96.58%	92.98%	87.01%	78.33%
Black or African American alone (NH)	963	996	1,281	1,360	1,768	1.48%	1.56%	1.79%	1.77%	2.15%
Native American or Alaska Native alone (NH)	70	89	99	145	132	0.11%	0.14%	0.14%	0.19%	0.16%
Asian alone (NH)	327	598	1,344	2,622	5,383	0.50%	0.94%	1.88%	3.41%	6.55%
Native Hawaiian or Pacific Islander alone (NH)	x	x	17	37	45	x	x	0.02%	0.05%	0.05%
Other race alone (NH)	95	60	106	99	290	0.15%	0.09%	0.15%	0.13%	0.35%
Mixed race or Multiracial (NH)	x	x	568	952	2,938	x	x	0.80%	1.24%	3.57%
Hispanic or Latino (any race)	427	435	1,598	4,762	7,257	0.66%	0.68%	2.24%	6.20%	8.83%
Total	65,088	63,657	71,435	76,794	82,208	100.00%	100.00%	100.00%	100.00%	100.00%

=== 2020 census ===
As of the 2020 census, the county had a population of 82,208. The median age was 37.8 years. 24.0% of residents were under the age of 18 and 16.7% of residents were 65 years of age or older. For every 100 females there were 98.2 males, and for every 100 females age 18 and over there were 96.9 males age 18 and over.

The racial makeup of the county was 80.0% White, 2.2% Black or African American, 0.4% American Indian and Alaska Native, 6.6% Asian, 0.1% Native Hawaiian and Pacific Islander, 4.7% from some other race, and 6.1% from two or more races. Hispanic or Latino residents of any race comprised 8.8% of the population.

69.3% of residents lived in urban areas, while 30.7% lived in rural areas.

There were 32,607 households in the county, of which 31.8% had children under the age of 18 living in them. Of all households, 50.5% were married-couple households, 18.4% were households with a male householder and no spouse or partner present, and 23.8% were households with a female householder and no spouse or partner present. About 26.7% of all households were made up of individuals and 10.9% had someone living alone who was 65 years of age or older.

There were 35,317 housing units, of which 7.7% were vacant. Among occupied housing units, 69.8% were owner-occupied and 30.2% were renter-occupied. The homeowner vacancy rate was 1.4% and the rental vacancy rate was 10.0%.

=== 2010 census ===
As of the 2010 United States census, there were 76,794 people and 29,860 households residing in the county. The population density was 188.7 inhabitants per square mile (72.9/km^{2}). There were 33,098 housing units at an average density of 81.3 per square mile (31.4/km^{2}).

In terms of ancestry, according to the 2010 census, 28.5% were German, 12.4% were English, 12.2% were Irish, and 10.7% were American.

Of the 29,860 households in 2010, 34.6% had children under the age of 18 living with them, 54.1% were married couples living together, 10.7% had a female householder with no husband present, 30.4% were non-families, and 25.3% of all households were made up of individuals. The average household size was 2.53 and the average family size was 3.02. The median age was 38.2 years.

In 2010, the median income for a household in the county was $47,697 and the median income for a family was $64,024. Males had a median income of $50,358 versus $32,334 for females; the per capita income for the county was $26,860; and approximately 7.7% of families and 10.4% of the population were below the poverty line, including 15.8% of those under age 18 and 5.3% of those age 65 or over.

== Education ==
Public schools in Bartholomew County are administered by the Bartholomew Consolidated School Corporation and the Flat Rock-Hawcreek School Corporation. The county's first tuition-free public charter school, the International School of Columbus, a middle school/high school, opened in 2009–10. The ISC was an International Baccalaureate World School offering the Diploma Program. The ISC closed due to financial difficulties in the fall of 2013.

Ivy Tech Community College Columbus is located in Bartholomew County.

== See also ==
- The Republic, daily newspaper covering Bartholomew County
- National Register of Historic Places listings in Bartholomew County, Indiana
