= List of public art in Bartholomew County, Indiana =

This is a list of public art in Bartholomew County, Indiana.

This list applies only to works of public art accessible in an outdoor public space. For example, this does not include artwork visible inside a museum.

== Columbus ==
Title	Artist	Year	Location/GPS Coordinates	Material and Dimensions	Worktype	Owner	Citations	Image
2 Arcs de 212.5˚	Bernar Venet	1987	The Commons (outside) 39°12′6.21″N 85°55′16.30″W	painted rolled steel	Sculpture	City of Columbus		
Amish quilts	Amish quilters from Goshen, Indiana	1910	Columbus City Hall	quilted fabric	Fiber Art	City of Columbus		
Ancestral Way	Robert Pulley	2006	Side State Highway 46 39°12′4.76″N 85°55′28.55″W	ceramic	Sculpture	City of Columbus		
Bartholomew County Memorial for Veterans	Charles Rose and Maryann Thompson	1997	Bartholomew County Courthouse lawn39°12′2.49″N 85°55′17.66″W	carved limestone, 25 pillars, each 40 ft. high	Memorial	Bartholomew County		
Between Heaven and Earth	Dale Enochs	2006	IUPUC University Park	limestone, steel	Sculpture	Dale Enochs		
Bicentennial Fountain and Dancing Fish	Tom Stephens (fountain) and C.R. Schiefer (fish)	1976	Bartholomew County Courthouse lawn 39°12′4.24″N 85°55′19.05″W	limestone, bronze, concrete, Sculpture: approx. 42 × 28 × 10 in.; Basin: approx. D. 12 in. × Diam. 20 ft.	Fountain	Bartholomew County		
Big Jeff, Piero's Jesus, and Aaron	Deborah Masters	2006	The Commons	bronze, wood	Sculpture	Deborah Masters		
Birds of Fire	Ted Sitting Crow Garner	1979	The Republic39°12′0.66″N 85°55′19.94″W	iron painted orange	Sculpture	Ted Sitting Crow Garner		
Block Out	Derick Malkemus	1997	Jackson Street	cast concrete, steel	Sculpture	Derick Malkemus		
Boy on a Dolphin	Unknown	1930	Inn at Irwin Gardens 39°12′13.9″N 85°55′2.59″W	bronze, Fountain: approx. 19 × 18 × 12 in.; Plinth: approx. 2 × 18 × 11 in.; Base: approx. W. 18 in. × D. 18 in.; Pond: approx. L. 25 ft. × W. 85 in.	Sculpture	Inn at Irwin Gardens		
Boy with Duck	Unknown	1910	Inn at Irwin Gardens 39°12′13.86″N 85°55′3.76″W	marble, Sculpture: approx. 30 × 16 × 18 in.	Sculpture	Inn at Irwin Gardens		
Bravo Cohort	Andrew Counceller	2013	Pedestrian walkway behind Indiana University Purdue University Columbus Campus Center 39°15′9.63″N 85°54′6.08″W	steel, stainless steel	Sculpture	Indiana University Purdue University Columbus		
C	Robert Indiana	1981	Columbus City Hall (west staircase) 39°11′59.71″N 85°55′13.38″W	oil paint on canvas	Painting	City of Columbus		
Carl Miske: Head of the River Rats	Lydia Burris	2003	Columbus City Hall 39°11′59.71″N 85°55′13.38″W	acrylic and oil paint on canvas	Painting	City of Columbus		
Celebration	Gary Lee Price	1998	Foundation for Youth 39°12′10.33″N 85°53′57.07″W	bronze	Sculpture	Foundation for Youth		
Chaos I	Jean Tinguely	1974	The Commons 39°12′7.75″N 85°55′16.47″W	Metal, industrial equipment, wood, painted metal, motors, and electrical components	Kinetic Sculpture	City of Columbus		
Charlie Kitzinger: Friend of the Orphans	Timothy Greatbatch	2002	Columbus City Hall 39°11′59.71″N 85°55′13.38″W	Oil paint on canvas	Painting	City of Columbus		
Chester Reynolds	Unknown	1889	Bartholomew County History Center	marble	Sculpture	Bartholomew County Historical Society		
Christ the Good Shephard	Unknown	1911	Garland Brook Cemetery, Northwest Entrance 39°12′7.75″N 85°55′16.47″W	Limestone atop a limestone arch base, Sculpture: approx. 8 × 2 1/2 × 2 ft.	Sculpture	Garland Brook Cemetery		
Christopher Columbus	Unknown	1992	Columbus City Hall	marble	Sculpture	City of Columbus		
Christus	Unknown	ca. 1965	Garland Brook Cemetery39°12′15.82″N 85°53′34.69″W	marble, Sculpture: approx. 84 × 36 × 19 in.	Sculpture	Garland Brook Cemetery		
Circle Canoe	James Darr	2006	Indiana University-Purdue University Columbus Duke Energy Sculpture Garden	painted steel and wood	Sculpture	James Darr		
City Hall Photograph collection	Bruce Baumann, Balthazar Korab	1981	Columbus City Hall 39°11′59.71″N 85°55′13.38″W	Color photographic prints	Photographs	City of Columbus		
Climbing Kids	Louis Joyner	2005	kidscommons Children's Museum39°12′6.34″N 85°55′15.23″W	Sheet steel painted green, blue, and red	Sculpture	kidscommons Children's Museum		
Crack the Whip	Jo Saylors	1998	Robert D. Garton Veteran's Plaza, 39°11′59.84″N 85°55′23.72″W	bronze, h 4 ft	Sculpture	Heritage Fund Community Foundation		
Crossroads	James Brenner	1999	Bartholomew County Courthouse lawn	steel	Sculpture	James Brenner		
Crump Monument	Unknown	1917	Columbus City Cemetery 39°12′53.38″N 85°54′55.59″W	marble	Sculpture	City of Columbus		
Crump Theater Mural	M.K. Ziegner	1942	Crump Theatre 39°12′4.87″N 85°55′12.84″W	Paint on wall	Mural	Columbus Capital Foundation		
Custom Tapestry	Form III	1941	First Christian Church 39°12′10.64″N 85°55′10.14″W	wool	Fiber Art	First Christian Church		
Daquqi	Peter Lundberg	1998	Robert D. Garton Veteran's Plaza 39°11′59.27″N 85°55′23.03″W	concrete, 9 tons, stainless steel	Sculpture	Peter Lundberg		
Deer figure	William E. Arnold	1993	Bartholomew Consolidated School Corporation Administrative Offices 39°12′10.64″N 85°55′10.14″W	metal wire	Sculpture	Bartholomew Consolidated School Corporation		
Desire	Jon Isherwood	1998	Columbus Area Visitors Center	foxhill granite	Sculpture	Jon Isherwood		
Diogenes, Socrates, Plato, and Aristotle	Unknown	1910	Inn at Irwin Gardens 39°12′13.93″N 85°55′3.77″W	marble, 4 pieces. Head of Diogenes: approx. H. 9 in.; Head of Socrates: approx. H. 12 in., Head of Plato: approx. H. 13 in.; Head of Aristotle: approx. H. 16 in.; Including columns, height: ranges from 56 to 59 in.	Sculpture	Inn at Irwin Gardens		
Discovery	Kusser Granitwerke	2007	Indiana University-Purdue University Columbus Campus Center 39°15′9.65″N 85°54′7.51″W	granite, water; d 3 ft.	Sculpture	Indiana University-Purdue University Columbus		
Dreaming of a Greener Columbus	Catherine Burris	2009	Jackson Place 39°12′28.57″N 85°55′22.81″W	paint and wood	Mural	Jackson Place, LLC		
Dwelling	Alexander Peace	2006	IUPUC University Park	wood	Sculpture	Alexander Peace		
Elephant	Golden Foundry	1932	Inn at Irwin Gardens	bronze, approx. 4 ft. × 65 in. × 3 ft.	Sculpture	Inn at Irwin Gardens 39°12′14″N 85°55′3.22″W		
Emergent Force	Robert Pulley	2001	IUPUC University Park	ceramic	Sculpture	Robert Pulley		
Eos	Dessa Kirk	2006	Median 5th Street between Brown and Lindsey Streets 39°12′12.06″N 85°55′28.85″W	steel and fiberglass painted metallic orange	Sculpture	City of Columbus		
Ethnic Expo quilt	Catherine Burris	1988	Columbus City Hall 39°11′59.71″N 85°55′13.38″W	quilted fabric	Fiber Art	City of Columbus		
Exploded Engine	Rudolph de Harak	1984	Cummins Corporate Office Building located in the Columbus Arts District 39°12′14.4″N 85°55′22.58″W	metal, wire, other materials, Sculpture: approx. 84 × 105 × 24 in.	Sculpture	Cummins Inc.		
Flight	Dante Ventresca	2001	Jolie Crider Memorial Skateboard Park, Clifty Park 39°11′50.38″N 85°52′48.33″W	paint on wood	Mural	City of Columbus		
Friendship Quilt	Columbus Star Quilters and Sister Quilters of Miyoshi, Aichi, Japan	2000	Columbus City Hall 39°11′59.71″N 85°55′13.38″W	quilted fabric	Fiber Art	City of Columbus		
Friendship Way neon sculpture	Cork Marcheschi	1998	Alley 39°12′10.62″N 85°55′17.36″W	neon lights, plexiglas, metal	Sculpture	City of Columbus		
Frog Pond	Jo Saylors	1995	Bartholomew Consolidated School Corporation Administrative Offices 39°12′40.76″N 85°54′16.02″W	bronze	Sculpture	Bartholomew Consolidated School Corporation		
Garden of Gethsemane	Unknown	1965	Garland Brook Cemetery 39°12′17.99″N 85°53′37.37″W	marble, Sculpture: approx. 60 × 20 × 60 in.	Sculpture	Garland Brook Cemetery		
General Joseph Bartholomew	R. Terrell	1826	Bartholomew County Courthouse 39°12′4.02″N 85°55′17.24″W	Oil paint on canvas	Painting	Bartholomew County		
Generations	Betty Boyle	2002	Columbus Post Office 39°12′10.86″N 85°55′22.03″W	watercolor on canvas	Mural	U.S. Postal Service		
Gift of the Sage	Robert Pulley	1994	Columbus North High School, Erne Auditorium 39°13′28.49″N 85°54′42.31″W	ceramic	Sculpture	Bartholomew Consolidated School Corporation		
Grace Basin	Judith Shea	2004	Our Hospice of South Central Indiana 39°12′59.41″N 85°53′32.42″W	bronze	Sculpture	Columbus Regional Hospital		
Growing Through the Seasons	Elizabeth Bays	2004	Harrison Ridge Park 39°11′20.82″N 85°58′24.94″W	paint on wall	Mural	City of Columbus		
Guardian	Terrence Karpowicz	2006	Robert D. Garton Veteran's Plaza	steel, granite, river rock	Sculpture	Terrence Karpowicz		
Halcyon	Todd Frahm	2011	Columbus Regional Hospital 39°12′59.36″N 85°53′46.68″W	limestone	Sculpture	Columbus Regional Hospital		
Hartman Monument	Unknown	ca. 1915	Columbus City Cemetery 39°12′58.6″N 85°54′59.45″W	marble, approx. 59 × 30 × 9 1/2 in.	Relief	City of Columbus		
History and Mystery	William T. Wiley	1984	Columbus City Hall (tympanum above City Hall Chambers) 39°11′59.71″N 85°55′13.38″W	paint on canvas	Mural	City of Columbus		
Homing Vessel	Felicia Glidden	2005	Columbus Area Visitors Center 39°12′14.19″N 85°55′10.25″W	cast iron	Sculpture	Columbus Area Visitors Center		
Horses	Costantino Nivola	1970	Richards Elementary School	fiberglass on a cement base 39°13′59.61″N 85°52′10.15″W	Sculpture	Bartholomew Consolidated School Corporation		
Iris	Scott Westphal	1997	Columbus Area Visitors Center garden	aluminum	Sculpture	Scott Westphal		
Into the Woods	Dante Ventresca and Rebecca Hutton	2002	Donner Park Shelter House	paint	Mural	City of Columbus		
Jack the Bum	Catherine Burris	1999	Columbus City Hall 39°11′59.71″N 85°55′13.38″W	acrylic paint	Painting	City of Columbus		
Jacob's Ladder	Bernie Carreño	2010	Hotel Indigo, lawn	steel painted red, yellow and orange; 14 × 8 × 4 ft	Sculpture	Bernie Carreno		
Kitzinger Alley Murals	Haywood, J. Haywood, and S. Truly	2003	Alley 39°12′7.03″N 85°55′15.33″W	Paint on cement block wall	Mural	City of Columbus		
KTA50	Tallix Foundry	1985	Cummins Inc. Corporate Headquarters, located in the Columbus Arts District 39°12′13.02″N 85°55′21.98″W	cast bronze on a stainless steel plated base	Sculpture	Cummins Inc.		
Large Arch	Henry Moore	1971	Cleo Rogers Memorial Library 39°12′13.26″N 85°55′6.92″W	sandcast bronze patinated dark green, approx. 20 ft. × 13 ft. 9 in. × 12 ft. (5 1/2 tons)	Sculpture	Bartholomew County Public Library Association		
Light Sculptures	James Brenner	2006	Bartholomew County History Center	stainless steel, glass, tungsten light	Sculpture	James Brenner		
Lilly	Linda Peterson	2017	Bartholomew Consolidated School Corporation Administrative Offices 39°12′40.76″N 85°54′16.02″W	bronze	Sculpture	Bartholomew Consolidated School Corporation		
Memorial Artillery	Ric Bauer	1980	Donner Aquatic Center 39°13′9.92″N 85°55′0.69″W	Steel painted black	Sculpture	City of Columbus		
Memorial to a Local Girl	Linda Peterson	1998	People trail near bridge to visitor entrance to Columbus Regional Hospital 39°13′1.37″N 85°53′51.04″W	limestone, marble	Sculpture	Columbus Regional Hospital		
Memorial to Town Founders	Unknown	1970	Memorial Plaza 39°12′1.43″N 85°55′31.63″W	bronze, limestone, steel	Memorial	City of Columbus		
Model Block Maquettes	Alexander Girard	1964	Columbus City Hall 39°11′59.71″N 85°55′13.38″W	Paint	Mural	City of Columbus		
Monk	Harry Gordon	2005	Columbus City Hall	black granite	Sculpture	Harry Gordon		
Mural of Columbus	Catherine Burris	1988	Dairy Queen, Columbus, Indiana 39°12′7.03″N 85°55′4.42″W	paint on wall	Mural	Dairy Queen		
One Step at a Time	Catherine Burris	2005	under the 10th St. Bridge 39°12′30.86″N 85°53′55.89″W	paint	Mural	City of Columbus		
Parade of Animals	Catherine Burris	2003	Columbus Animal Control Shelter 39°15′15.67″N 85°53′28.99″W	paint	Mural	Columbus Animal Control Shelter		
Puddles	Jo Saylors	1995	Bartholomew Consolidated School Corporation Administrative Offices 39°12′40.76″N 85°54′16.02″W	bronze	Sculpture	Bartholomew Consolidated School Corporation		
Puzzle #3	Jay Dougan	2006	Indiana University-Purdue University Columbus Duke Energy Sculpture Garden	Cedar	Sculpture	Jay Dougan		
Quintin G. Noblitt (1882–1954)	W. Douglas Hartley	1949	Columbus Youth Camp 39°10′24.28″N 86°3′22.92″W	bronze, Sculpture: overall approx. 8 ft. × 14 in. × 9 in.	Sculpture	Foundation for Youth		
Reach	Neil Goodman	2003	Former Irwin Union Bank atrium	fiberglass	Sculpture	Neil Goodman		
Red Arbor	Stanley Saitowitz	1992	Mill Race Park 39°12′22.1″N 85°55′54.23″W	steel painted red	Sculpture	City of Columbus		
Renee and Child	Jerald Jacquard	2009	Pedestal beside RSVP Veneers Warehouse entrance 39°12′39.53″N 85°55′45.69″W	stainless steel, concrete	Sculpture	RSVP Veneers Warehouse		
Ruddick Monument	Unknown	1910	Columbus City Cemetery 39°13′0.04″N 85°54′55.55″W	marble on granite base, Sculpture: approx. 65 × 30 × 24 in.	Sculpture	City of Columbus		
Self-Made Man	Bobbie Carlyle	2000	Indiana University-Purdue University Columbus Learning Center 39°15′0.65″N 85°54′10.89″W	bronze	Sculpture	Columbus Learning Center		
Sermon on the Mount	Loja Saarinen and Eliel Saarinen	1942	First Christian Church 39°12′10.66″N 85°55′8.74″W	quilted fabric, wool, flax	Fiber Art	First Christian Church		
Sermon on the Mount	Unknown	1965	Garland Brook Cemetery 39°12′13.6″N 85°53′37.39″W	marble	Sculpture	Garland Brook Cemetery		
Shape Shifters with Celestial Sphere	Coral Lambert	2006	Bartholomew County Courthouse lawn 39°12′1.7″N 85°55′19.61″W	cast aluminum, enamelled cast iron and steel	Sculpture	Coral Lambert		
Skopos	Ric Bauer	1979	Mill Race Park 39°12′8.65″N 85°55′36.68″W	Cor-Ten Steel, Sculpture: approx. 15 ft. × 10 ft. × 7 ft. 2 in.	Sculpture	City of Columbus		
Stop...Think	Dante Ventresca and Rebecca Hutton	2002	Foundation for Youth 39°12′11.16″N 85°53′56.32″W	paint	Mural	City of Columbus		
Summer Storm	Michael Helbing	2006	Bartholomew County Courthouse lawn 39°12′1.76″N 85°55′17.03″W	stainless steel	Sculpture	Michael Helbing		
Sun Dial Tower	Kevin Kennon	2005	Indiana University-Purdue University Columbus Learning Center 39°15′4.78″N 85°54′14.03″W	brick, aluminium	Sculpture	Indiana University-Purdue University Columbus Learning Center		
Sun Garden Panels in Suspended Circle	Dale Chihuly	2007	Indiana University-Purdue University Columbus Learning Center 39°15′0.65″N 85°54′10.89″W	painted plexiglass	Sculpture	Indiana University-Purdue University Columbus Learning Center		
The Bird Boy	Myra Reynolds Richards	1924	Central Middle School, second floor 39°12′19.07″N 85°54′55.21″W	bronze, limestone	Sculpture	Bartholomew County Historical Society		
The Calm at the Center	Dante Ventresca and Paul Neufelder	2000	Lincoln Park Handball Court	paint	Mural	City of Columbus		
The Family	Harris Barron	1962	Parkside Elementary School 39°14′29.52″N 85°54′34.25″W	granite	Sculpture	Bartholomew Consolidated School Corporation		
The Industrial Quilt	Brian Bailey	2001	Columbus Area Visitors Center	steel painted multicolors	Sculpture	Brian Bailey		
The Joy of a Small School	Alison Graf Murray	2010	Pedestrian walkway behind Indiana University Purdue University Columbus Campus Center 39°15′10.81″N 85°54′4.22″W	limestone	Sculpture	Indiana University Purdue University Columbus		
The Moment	S. Thomas Scarff	2001	Courtyard adjacent to Columbus Pump House	aluminum, aluminum bronze, neon, textile	Sculpture	S. Thomas Scarff		
The Old Sleigh a portrait of Tommy Warner	David Williams	2000	Columbus City Hall 39°11′59.71″N 85°55′13.38″W	Oil paint on canvas	Painting	City of Columbus		
The Skater	Dale Patterson and Malcolm Stalcup	2000	Hamilton Center Ice Arena 39°13′21.31″N 85°53′42.87″W	Cor-Ten steel	Sculpture	City of Columbus		
The Staff of Jizo Bosatsu	Katrin Asbury	2006	Indiana University-Purdue University Columbus Duke Energy Sculpture Garden	cypress, bronze, mahogany	Sculpture	Katrin Asbury		
The Stork in Flight	Raffaello Romanelli	1910	Inn at Irwin Gardens	bronze, Fountain: approx. 29 × 37 × 12 in.; Each frog: approx. 3 1/2 × 5 1/2 × 4 in.; Basin: approx. H. 54 in. × Diam. 39 in.	Sculpture	Inn at Irwin Gardens		
Transformations	Howard Meehan	2010	Indiana University Purdue University Columbus Campus 39°15′11.04″N 85°54′12.63″W	Dichroic glass, stainless steel; h 30 ft	Sculpture	Indiana University Purdue University Columbus		
Transition	Catherine Burris	1994	Central Middle School 39°12′14.04″N 85°54′55.72″W	PVC pipes covered in painted canvas	Wall construction	Bartholomew Consolidated School Corporation		
Tree Cozies	Unknown	2008	Downtown Columbus, Indiana	knitted and crocheted fabrics	Fiber Art	Unknown		
Twisted	Mark Wallis	2007	Hotel Indigo lawn	steel	Sculpture	Mark Wallis		
Two Boys & a Fish	Unknown	ca. 1910	Inn at Irwin Gardens 39°12′13.86″N 85°55′3.76″W	marble, Fountain: approx. 39 × 32 × 27 in.	Sculpture	Inn at Irwin Gardens		
Unknown heads	Unknown	1970	Inn at Irwin Gardens 39°12′14.38″N 85°55′3.92″W	limestone	Sculpture	Inn at Irwin Gardens		
Untitled (abstract sculpture)	William Robertson	1980	Goltra, Cline, and King, P.C.	Chrome, pipes & concrete, Sculpture: approx. H. 11 ft. × Diam. 5 ft.	Sculpture	Goltra, Cline, and King, P.C.		
Untitled (Columbus Bar Mural)	Glenn Covert	2012	Power House Brewery 39°12′9.26″N 85°55′18.4″W	paint on brick	Mural	Power House Brewing		
War Memorial	Unknown	1972	Garland Brook Cemetery 39°12′26.88″N 85°53′33.44″W	bronze, leather, rubber, Sculpture: approx. 55 × 29 1/2 × 9 in.	Sculpture	Garland Brook Cemetery		
When I Was Your Age	J. Seward Johnson Jr.	1990	Faurecia Emissions Control Technologies 39°8′8.6″N 85°56′11.65″W	bronze, steel, rubber, resin coated textile, paint, other metals	Sculpture	Faurecia Emissions Control Technologies		
Wooden Crane and Silent Bell	Joe Thompson	2006	Indiana University-Purdue University Columbus Duke Energy Sculpture Garden	wood, aluminum	Sculpture	Joe Thompson		
Yellow Neon Chandelier and Persians	Dale Chihuly	1995	Columbus Area Visitors Center 39°12′13.74″N 85°55′10.43″W	Blown glass	Sculpture	Columbus Area Visitors Center		
Yellowwood Coral	Lucy Slivinski	2006	Columbus Recycling Center 39°11′17.43″N 85°54′2.19″W	steel, scrap metal, bike frames	Sculpture	City of Columbus		
Young Republic	Jean-Julien Deltil	1975	PNC Bank 39°12′8.33″N 85°55′15.52″W	wallpaper mural	Mural	PNC Bank		

== Edinburgh ==
Title	Artist	Year	Location/GPS Coordinates	Material	Dimensions	Owner	Image
On Point	Alexa Laver	1992	Camp Atterbury	Limestone	Sculpture: approx. 78 x 24 x 54 in.	Memorial Foundation for Indiana National Guard	

== Taylorsville ==
Title	Artist	Year	Location/GPS Coordinates	Material	Dimensions	Owner	Image
Bear Necessities	Joe LaMantia	1999	Taylorsville Elementary School 39°17′50.6″N 85°56′54.07″W	steel	Sculpture	Bartholomew Consolidated School Corporation	

== See also ==
- List of public art in Indiana
