= Friendship Way =

Alley way and artwork in Columbus, Indiana

- Artist: Cork Marcheschi and William A. Johnson
- Year: 1998
- Type: Neon art
- Location: Columbus, Indiana, United States
- Owner: City of Columbus

Friendship Way is the name of the brick-lined alley in the 400-block between Washington and Jackson Streets in Columbus, Indiana, United States. It was designed by William A. Johnson Associates of Seattle, Washington, landscaped by Storrow Kinsella Associates of Indianapolis, Indiana and completed in 1998. The untitled neon sculpture located in Friendship Way is an outdoor sculpture by American artist Cork Marcheschi. The sculpture is owned and maintained by the city of Columbus.

== Description ==
The walls of the alley are uniformly painted a cream color. Garden beds of English ivy occasionally line the brick pathway, and two rectangular trellises stand halfway down against the northern wall. Two classic wooden benches rest against the northern wall, as well as two distinctive red streetlights.

The walkway is lined with two colors of brick, with horizontal stripes of light red bricks interrupting repeating sections of dark red-purple bricks. Many of the dark-colored bricks have names carved into them. Two rectangular granite plaques are embedded in the footpath at the Washington Street entrance to Friendship Way. The larger granite plaque reads the following in English and Japanese: "The bricks that form this walkway are a gift of friendship from Mayor Michio Tsukamoto and the citizens of Miyoshi, Japan." The smaller granite plaque reads: "Friendship Way, Dedicated August 5, 1998 by Mayor Michio Tsukamoto, Miyoshi, Japan, Mayor Fred Armstrong, Columbus, Indiana."

=== Sculpture ===
An untitled neon sculpture by Cork Marcheschi is mounted on the southern wall of Friendship Way. It is about 10 feet above the ground and extends for nearly 80 feet east to west. This abstract sculpture consists of colored neon lights housed in 13 multicolored, translucent Plexiglas shapes. For each shape, the Plexiglas panels are held together with an aluminum frame. The shapes include squares, rectangles, yellow circles, and a pink semi-circle with a circular void. While most of these shapes were fully lit by the neon within, the yellow circle contains neon in a spiral that rotates when fully operational. Other lights within the sculpture flicker or appear to move and are bright enough to be viewed during the day.

== Historical information ==
In 1990, the city government supported the Streetscape project, a plan to redesign the public space on Washington Street, one of its important thoroughfares. New trees, brick walkways, and banners were included in the original Streetscape project. In 1998 the Streetscape project spread to the 400, 500 and 600 block alleys on the west side of Washington Street, including Friendship Way. The 500 and 600 block alleys are similar in design to Friendship Way, with bricks, English ivy and trellises, but they do not contain public art. In addition to the renovations of the alleys, drainage issues on Fourth and Fifth Streets were repaired. Landscaping of the three alleys was completed by Storrow Kinsella Associates of Indianapolis, Indiana. At the time of this project, William A. Johnson was the urban design advisor to Columbus.

The name Friendship Way refers to the lasting friendship between sister cities Columbus and Miyoshi, Aichi, Japan. Citizens of Miyoshi contributed over $28,000 to pay for Marcheschi's neon sculpture by sponsoring engraved bricks used to line the walkway. Cork Marcheschi's untitled neon sculpture was chosen by a selection committee of interested local parties. Federal funds subsidized $99,000 of the total $130,000 of the redesign of all three alleys.

The dedication of Friendship Way took place on Wednesday, August 5, 1998. Michio Tsukamoto and Fred Armstrong (then mayors of Miyoshi, Aichi and Columbus respectively), were in attendance. School children from both Miyoshi and Columbus assisted in cutting the ribbon, and Columbus students from Lincoln Elementary School sang two friendship songs in Japanese.

The empty trellises were designed to trail honeysuckle and clematis, but as of 2014, they are empty.

=== Location history ===
Cork Marcheschi's neon sculpture is a site specific work created specifically for Friendship Way and was installed shortly after the alley's dedication in August 1998.

Friendship Way is located in the 400-block of Washington Street in Columbus, Indiana. One entrance to Friendship Way opens between 416 and 424 Washington Street. The other entrance opens to the back of the public parking lot at Jackson and Fourth Streets.

== Artist ==
Cork Marcheschi, from San Francisco, received his MFA in Sculpture from the California College for Arts and Crafts in 1970. Marcheschi went on to teach at the University of California at Berkeley, San Francisco Art Institute, the Minneapolis College of Art and Design and the Tacoma Museum of Glass. Marcheschi's public work is displayed across America and Hong Kong.

At the time of installation, this was Cork Marcheschi's smallest outdoor public sculpture.

== See also ==
- List of public art in Bartholomew County, Indiana
- Chaos I by Jean Tinguely
- Irwin Gardens at the Inn at Irwin Gardens
- Large Arch by Henry Moore
- 2 Arcs de 212.5˚ by Bernar Venet
- Horses by Costantino Nivola
- The Family by Harris Barron
- Yellow Neon Chandelier and Persians by Dale Chihuly
- C by Robert Indiana
- Sermon on the Mount by Loja Saarinen and Eliel Saarinen
- History and Mystery by William T. Wiley
- Exploded Engine by Rudolph de Harak
