= Large Arch =

Sculpture by Henry Moore (LH 503b)

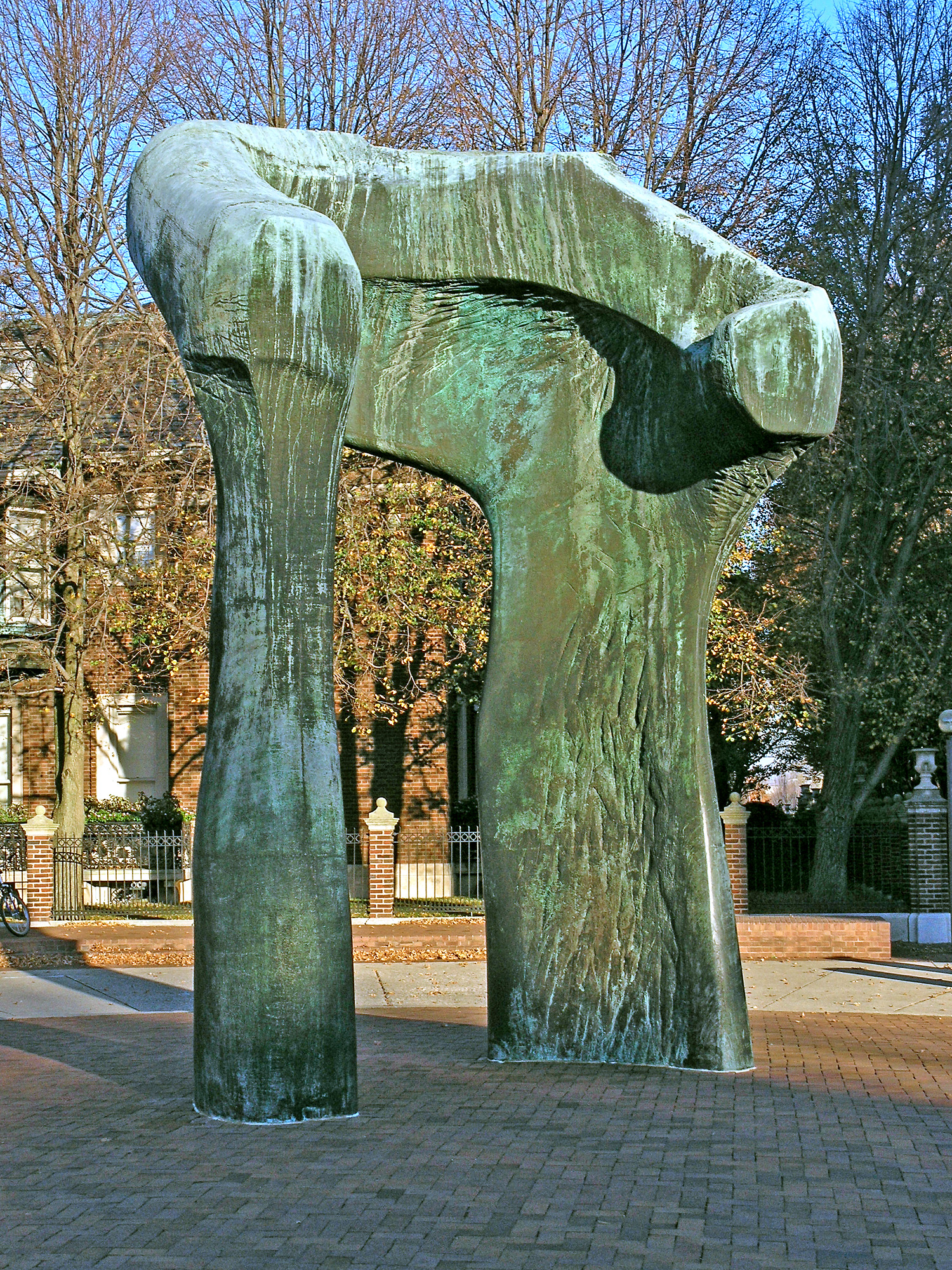
- Artist: Henry Moore
- Year: 1971
- Catalogue: LH 503b
- Type: Bronze
- Dimensions: 5.9 m (19.5 ft); 3.8 m diameter (12.5 ft)
- Location: Cleo Rogers Memorial Library; Columbus, Indiana, United States; 39°12′13.37″N 85°55′6.97″W
- Owner: Cleo Rogers Memorial Library, Public Library of Bartholomew County, Indiana

Large Arch (LH 503b) is an outdoor sculpture by British sculptor Henry Moore. It was installed in 1971 and is located in the outdoor plaza of the Cleo Rogers Memorial Library in Columbus, Indiana. Xenia and J. Irwin Miller commissioned the sculpture and gave it to the library. The sculpture is nearly 20 feet tall and is made of sandcast bronze that has been patinated.

== Description ==
Large Arch is an abstract bronze sculpture of an arch created by Henry Moore. The shape of the sculpture suggests human hip and leg bones, while the negative space on the interior of the arch suggests an abstracted human torso with head. It is 19 feet 6 inches tall. The width of the sculpture at its base is 12 feet 3 inches wide, but is 13 feet 9 inches at its widest at the top. While the sculpture is hollow, it weighs approximately 11,000 lb (5,000 kg). Despite the fact that it was sandcast in 50 sections and then assembled in Germany before being brought on site in 1971, the surface of the sculpture is smooth with little evidence of the joins. The surface of the sculpture was originally patinated green, and was expected to change very little with age. Moore described the original color as Paris green. As of 2014 the patina has progressed, with a light blue patina forming in areas that are most exposed to rain. The deep wrinkles and rough surface of the sculpture is part of the original design, which I.M. Pei has described as "elephant skin."

The sculpture is surrounded by a circular red-brick paved pedestrian plaza.

Moore's signature at the base of Large Arch and the foundry mark "H. Noack" in Berlin

== Historical information ==
The artist Henry Moore cites his inspiration was the monument of Stonehenge in England, as well as the shoulders of a man. The Museum of Modern Art (MoMA) owns a smaller version of the bronze arch by Moore titled Large Torso, which dates from 1962 to 1963, before the creation of the Columbus Large Arch or the Cleo Rogers Memorial Library.

I.M. Pei had the idea of a large work of art to sit in the Fifth Street public plaza that would pull together the space between his newly built Cleo Rogers Memorial Library, the Irwin Gardens by Henry A. Phillips (just east of the library) and the First Christian Church by Eliel Saarinen (across the street). Pei wanted a sculpture that could be touched and walked through. After seeing Henry Moore's Large Torso at the MoMA and watching his daughter run and play within the small arch, Pei asked Henry Moore to make an arch twice as big, with enough for two adults to walk through side-by-side comfortably. Moore agreed so long as it was not so large or positioned in such a way that an automobile could pass through it. Moore also gave over control of the positioning of the arch within the plaza, trusting Pei and J. Irwin Miller to consider how visitors may approach as well as the position of the sun.

In September 1970, Xenia Irwin Miller, co-commissioner of Large Arch, presented a 24-minute color film on the work of Henry Moore which was produced by the Encyclopædia Britannica Education corporation. Miller also presented her visit with Moore at his studio in England in July 1970.

Complex patina and surface texture of Large Arch

Large Arch was sandcast in 40-50 segments in Berlin, West Germany by the Herman Noack Foundry. Each casting is about a quarter of an inch thick. It was shipped to New Orleans, barged up the Mississippi and Ohio Rivers to New Albany, Indiana and was then driven north to Columbus, Indiana on a flat bed trailer on Interstate 65 to Columbus where it was delivered on a truck and assembled as a single piece. Before its installation, a temporary plywood sculpture was erected in late 1970 to give an idea of the size of the sculpture.

The dedication ceremony of the library did not occur until the installation of Moore's sculpture on May 16, 1971, two years after the library building was complete. I.M. Pei was in attendance and gave a short speech emphasizing the use of the plaza where Large Arch is placed as a public space that emphasizes the importance of the nearby buildings. Also present at the dedication were Carl Weinhardt, director of the Indianapolis Museum of Art at the time, Kenneth D. B. Carruthers, who worked with I.M. Pei on the library's design, and Robert Indiana, artist. Henry Moore did not attend.

Even before its placement, Large Arch was considered a controversial choice by the surrounding community. It has been given colloquial names like "Dentist's Dream," "Large Hip Joint" and "The Big Bone." The arch is now featured on tours provided by the Columbus Area Visitor Center, and before he died, Moore considered it to be one of his most important works. It was also featured prominently in the book Henry Moore in America by Harry J. Seldis.

=== Location history ===
Large Arch in Columbus, Indiana, was commissioned especially for the public plaza outside I.M. Pei’s Cleo Rogers Memorial Library. With its anthropomorphic features, it is a soft organic contrast to the hard geometric shapes that dominate the Library and First Christian Church.

The plaza is Roman style, brick-paved and circular, and the arch is placed in the center of a slightly raised roundabout. In the past, cars were allowed to drive around the arch and park temporarily for the library, but this road was closed off shortly after to create a pedestrian plaza. The plaza is designed for use by the public. In 2013-14, the plaza underwent repairs but Large Arch is still on view.

Similar bronze arches by Henry Moore are on display at the Museum of Modern Art in New York City, the Lynden Sculpture Garden in Milwaukee, Wisconsin, and the Nelson Atkins Museum of Art in Kansas City, Missouri. A similar arch by Moore made from travertine is also on display in Kensington Gardens in London.

=== Acquisition ===
Large Arch was approved by the Bartholomew County Library board and paid for by Xenia and J. Irwin Miller at the suggestion of I.M. Pei. The Millers donated the work to the Bartholomew County Library.

== Condition ==
At some point between the sculpture’s installation in 1971 and 1985, a line of caulking was added around the base of Large Arch to prevent water pooling and freeze/thaw damage.

In October 1984, Large Arch was vandalized. An encircled capital letter "A" was spray painted in white on the south-east outer face of the sculpture, which may have referred to the musical style of Anarcho-punk. While the Bartholomew County Library posted a reward for information about the crime, no one was ever charged. Two efforts were made to remove the paint, the first of which was in December 1984. Phoebe Weil, a well-known sculpture conservator from Saint Louis who pioneered the field in the 1970s, removed as much paint as possible from Large Arch. Weil also recommended coating the sculpture to ensure easier removal of future paint-based attacks. The second attempt to remove the spray-painted A was in spring of 1986. This time the library association contacted Henry Moore's studio for recommendations, approval of future cleaning, and to create a plan of regular maintenance schedule for the future. Unnamed art conservators from Cincinnati and New York City gave their opinions for future care, and both agreed that coating the sculpture in a special wax mixture would protect it from future paint-based attack.

== See also ==
- List of sculptures by Henry Moore
- List of public art in Bartholomew County, Indiana
- Cleo Rogers Memorial Library by I. M. Pei
- First Christian Church (Columbus, Indiana) by Eliel Saarinen
- Chaos I by Jean Tinguely
- Friendship Way by Cork Marcheschi
