= Columbus, Indiana =

- City
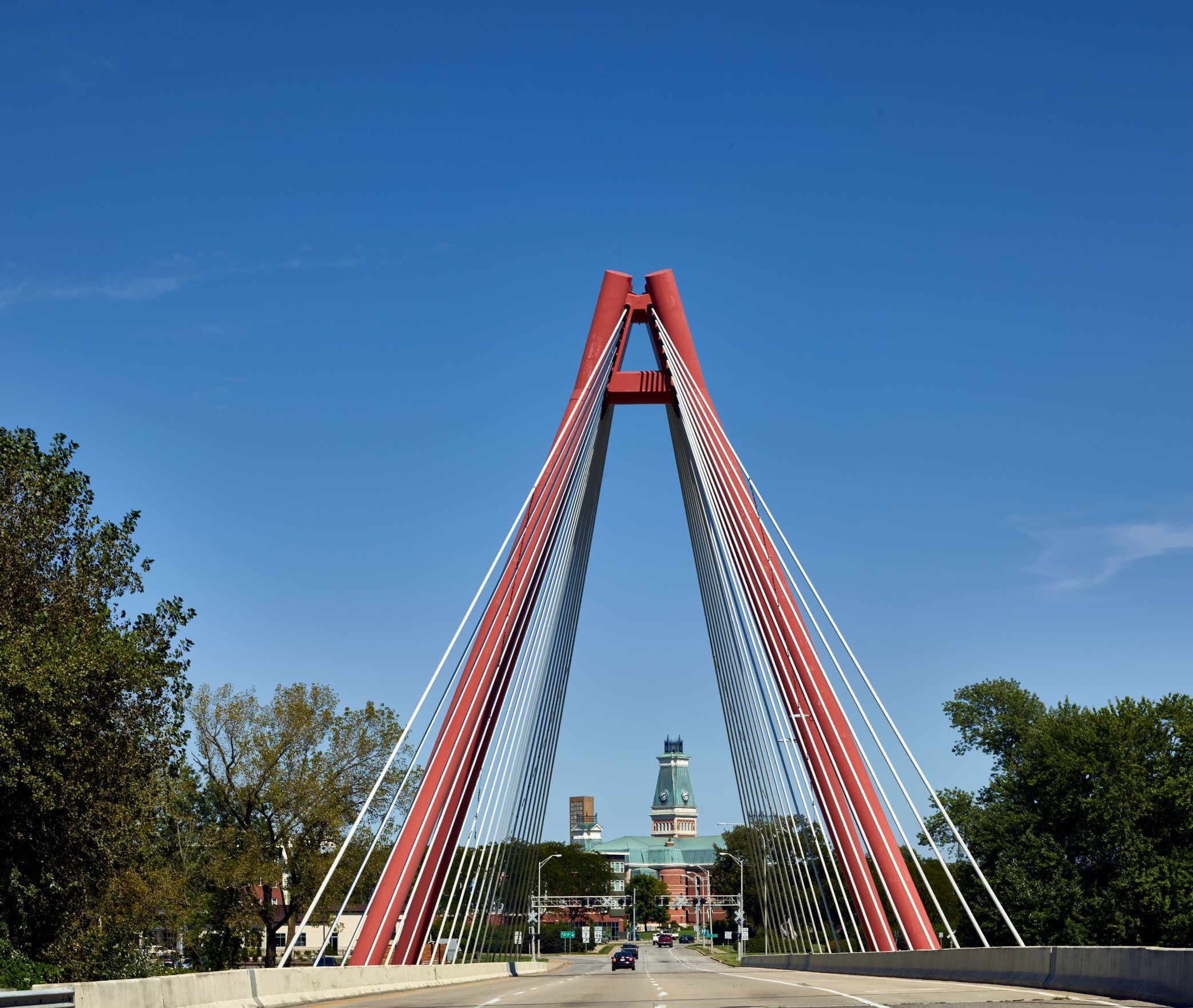
- The Robert N. Stewart Bridge (foreground), with the Bartholomew County Courthouse and First Christian Church visible in the background

- Flag Logo
- Nickname: "Athens on the Prairie"
- Motto: "Unexpected. Unforgettable"
- Interactive map of Columbus, Indiana
- Location within Indiana Location within the United States
- Coordinates: 39°12′50″N 85°54′40″W
- Country: United States
- State: Indiana
- County: Bartholomew
- Townships: Columbus, Clay, Flat Rock, Harrison, Wayne
- Founded: 1821
- Incorporated (town): 1864
- Incorporated (city): 1921

Government
  - Mayor: Mary Ferdon (R)

Area
  - Total: 28.75 sq mi (74.47 km^{2})
  - Land: 28.41 sq mi (73.59 km^{2})
  - Water: 0.34 sq mi (0.88 km^{2})
- Elevation: 627 ft (191 m)

Population (2020)
  - Total: 50,474
  - Density: 1,776/sq mi (685.9/km^{2})
- Time zone: UTC−5 (EST)
  - Summer (DST): UTC−4 (EDT)
- ZIP Codes: 47201–47203
- Area codes: 812 and 930
- FIPS code: 18-14734
- GNIS feature ID: 2393609
- Website: www.columbus.in.gov

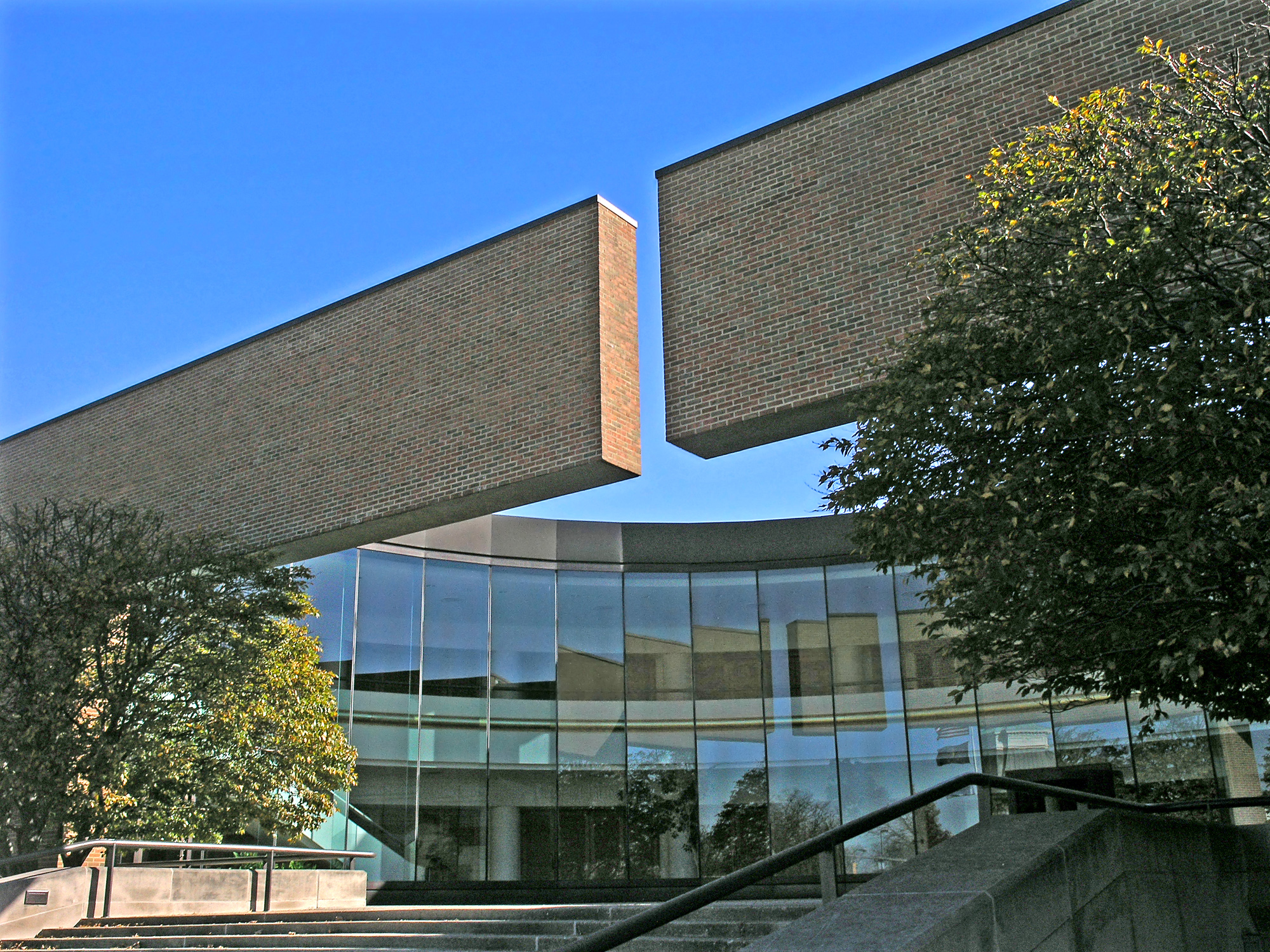
Columbus City Hall

Columbus (/kəˈlʌmbəs/) is a city in and the county seat of Bartholomew County, Indiana, United States. The population was 50,474 at the 2020 census. The city is known for its architectural significance, having commissioned noted works of modern architecture and public art since the mid-20th century; the annual program Exhibit Columbus celebrates this legacy. Located about 40 mi (64 km) south of Indianapolis, on the east fork of the White River, it is the state's 20th-largest city. It is the principal city of the Columbus, Indiana, metropolitan statistical area, which encompasses all of Bartholomew County. Columbus is the birthplace of former Indiana Governor and former Vice President of the United States, Mike Pence.

Columbus is the headquarters of the engine company Cummins. In 2004 the city was named as one of "The Ten Most Playful Towns" by Nick Jr. Family Magazine. In the July 2005 edition of GQ magazine, Columbus was named as one of the "62 Reasons to Love Your Country". Columbus won the national contest "America in Bloom" in 2006, and in late 2008, National Geographic Traveler ranked Columbus 11th on its historic destinations list, describing the city as "authentic, unique, and unspoiled".

== History ==
The land developed as Columbus was bought by General John Tipton and Luke Bonesteel in 1820. Tipton built a log cabin on Mount Tipton, a small hill overlooking White River and the surrounding flat, heavily forested and swampy valley. It held wetlands of the river. The town was first known as Tiptona, named in honor of Tipton. The town's name was changed to Columbus on March 20, 1821. Many people believe Tipton was upset by the name change, but no evidence exists to prove this. Nonetheless, he decided to leave the newly founded town and did not return.

Tipton was later appointed as the highway commissioner for the State of Indiana and was assigned to building a highway from Indianapolis, Indiana to Louisville, Kentucky. When the road approached Columbus, Tipton constructed the first bypass road ever built; it detoured south around the west side of Columbus en route to Seymour.

Joseph McKinney was the first to plot the town of Columbus, but no date was recorded. Local history books for years said that the land on which Columbus sits was donated by Tipton. However, in 2003, Historic Columbus Indiana acquired a deed showing that Tipton had sold the land.

A ferry was established below the confluence of the Flatrock and Driftwood rivers, which form the White River. A village of three or four log cabins developed around the ferry landing, and a store was added in 1821. Later that year, Bartholomew County was organized by an act of the State Legislature and named to honor the famous Hoosier militiaman, General Joseph Bartholomew. Columbus was incorporated as a town on June 28, 1864, and was incorporated as a city 1921.

The first railroad in Indiana was constructed to Columbus from Madison, Indiana in 1844. This eventually became the Madison branch of the Pennsylvania Railroad. The railroad fostered the growth of the community into one of the largest in Indiana, and three more railroads reached the city by 1850.

The Crump Theatre in Columbus, built in 1889 by John Crump, is the oldest theater in Indiana. Today the building is included within the Columbus Historic District. Before it closed permanently in 2010, it was an all-ages venue with occasional musical performances.

The Cummins Bookstore began operations in the city in 1892. Until late 2007, when it closed, it was the oldest continually operated bookstore in Indiana.

The Irwin Union Bank building was built in 1954. It was designated as a National Historic Landmark by the National Park Service in 2001 in recognition of its unique architecture. The building consists of a one-story bank structure adjacent to a three-story office annex. A portion of the office annex was built along with the banking hall in 1954. The remaining larger portion, designed by Kevin Roche John Dinkeloo and Associates, was built in 1973. Eero Saarinen designed the bank building with its glazed hall to be set off against the blank background of its three-story brick annex. Two steel and glass vestibule connectors lead from the north side of this structure to the annex. The building was designed to distance the Irwin Union Bank from traditional banking architecture, which mostly echoed imposing, neoclassical style buildings of brick or stone. Tellers were behind iron bars and removed from their customers. Saarinen worked to develop a building that would welcome customers rather than intimidate them.

== Economy ==
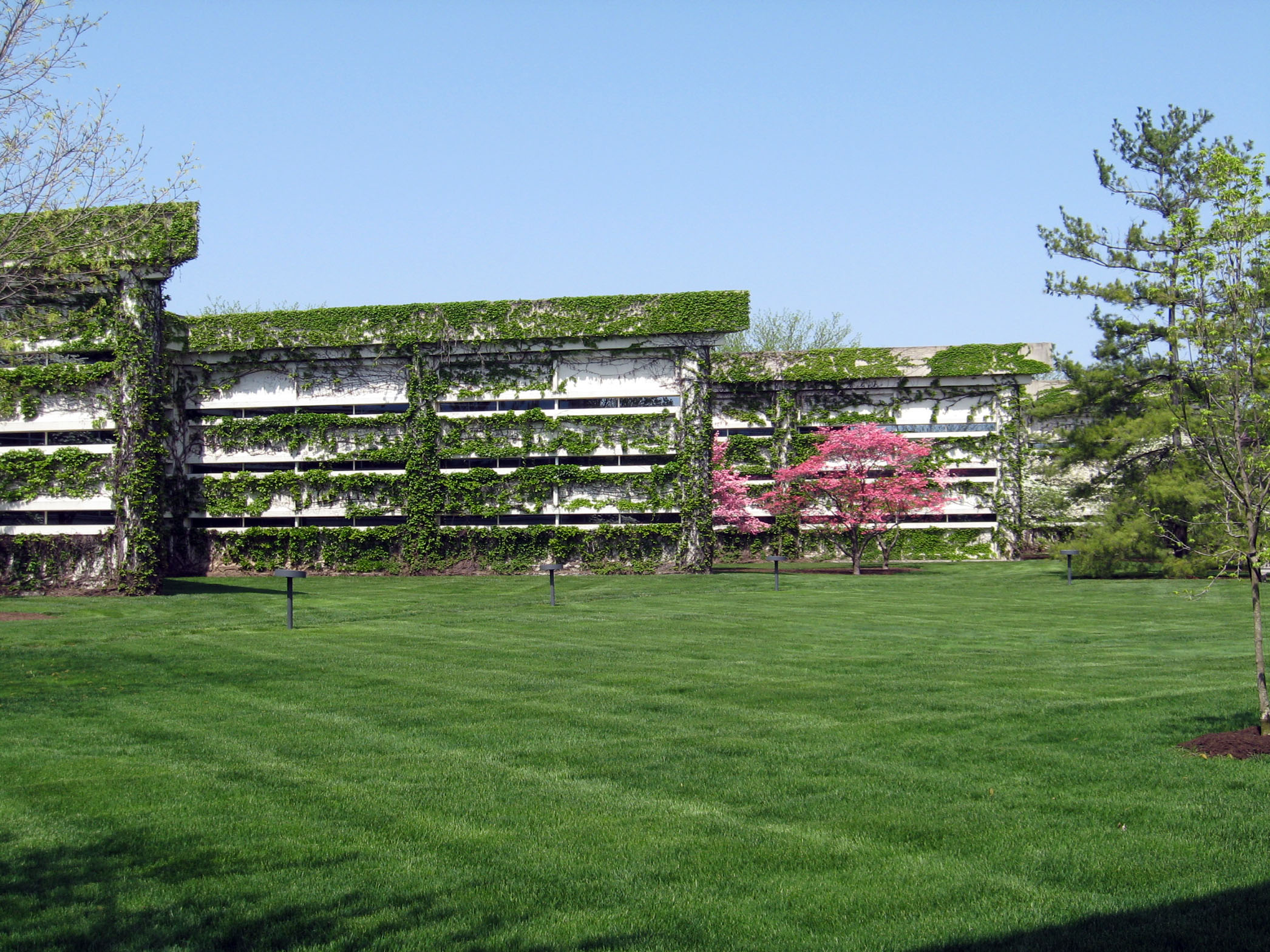
Cummins Corporate Office Building in 2008

Columbus has been home to many manufacturing companies, including Noblitt-Sparks Industries, which built radios under the Arvin brand in the 1930s, and Arvin Industries (now Meritor). After merging with Meritor Automotive on July 10, 2000, the headquarters of the newly created ArvinMeritor Industries was established in Troy, Michigan, the home of parent company, Rockwell International. It was announced in February 2011 that the company name would revert to Meritor, Inc.

Cummins is by far the region's largest employer, and the Infotech Park in Columbus accounts for a sizable number of research jobs in the city itself. Just south of Columbus are the North American headquarters of Toyota Material Handling, the world's largest material handling (forklift) manufacturer.

Other notable industries include architecture, a discipline for which Columbus is famous worldwide. The late Joseph Irwin Miller (then president and chairman of Cummins) launched the Cummins Foundation, a charitable program that helps subsidize a large number of architectural projects throughout the city by up-and-coming engineers and architects.

Early in the 20th century, Columbus also was home to a number of pioneering car manufacturers, including Reeves, which produced the unusual four-axle Octoauto and the twin rear-axle Sextoauto, both around 1911.

== Geography ==
The Driftwood and Flatrock Rivers converge at Columbus to form the East Fork of the White River.

According to the 2010 census, Columbus has a total area of 27.886 square miles (72.22 km^{2}), of which 27.5 square miles (71.22 km^{2}) (or 98.62%) is land and 0.386 square miles (1.00 km^{2}) (or 1.38%) is water.

=== Climate ===
Climate data for Columbus, Indiana (1991–2020)
Month	Jan	Feb	Mar	Apr	May	Jun	Jul	Aug	Sep	Oct	Nov	Dec	Year
Mean daily maximum °F (°C)	38.6 (3.7)	42.9 (6.1)	53.5 (11.9)	65.6 (18.7)	74.9 (23.8)	83.1 (28.4)	86.1 (30.1)	85.4 (29.7)	79.7 (26.5)	68.0 (20.0)	54.4 (12.4)	42.9 (6.1)	64.6 (18.1)
Daily mean °F (°C)	30.0 (−1.1)	33.3 (0.7)	42.7 (5.9)	53.9 (12.2)	64.0 (17.8)	72.7 (22.6)	75.7 (24.3)	74.4 (23.6)	67.6 (19.8)	55.8 (13.2)	44.1 (6.7)	34.6 (1.4)	54.1 (12.3)
Mean daily minimum °F (°C)	21.5 (−5.8)	23.7 (−4.6)	31.9 (−0.1)	42.2 (5.7)	53.0 (11.7)	62.2 (16.8)	65.4 (18.6)	63.3 (17.4)	55.4 (13.0)	43.6 (6.4)	33.8 (1.0)	26.2 (−3.2)	43.5 (6.4)
Average precipitation inches (mm)	3.42 (87)	2.91 (74)	3.78 (96)	5.00 (127)	4.99 (127)	5.31 (135)	4.54 (115)	3.48 (88)	3.21 (82)	3.39 (86)	3.60 (91)	3.71 (94)	47.34 (1,202)
Average snowfall inches (cm)	5.9 (15)	4.5 (11)	1.8 (4.6)	0.0 (0.0)	0.0 (0.0)	0.0 (0.0)	0.0 (0.0)	0.0 (0.0)	0.0 (0.0)	0.0 (0.0)	0.1 (0.25)	4.0 (10)	16.3 (40.85)
Source: NOAA

== Demographics ==
Historical population
Census	Pop.	Note	%±
1850	1,008		—
1860	1,840		82.5%
1870	3,359		82.6%
1880	4,813		43.3%
1890	6,719		39.6%
1900	8,130		21.0%
1910	8,813		8.4%
1920	8,990		2.0%
1930	9,935		10.5%
1940	11,738		18.1%
1950	18,370		56.5%
1960	20,778		13.1%
1970	26,457		27.3%
1980	30,614		15.7%
1990	31,802		3.9%
2000	39,059		22.8%
2010	44,061		12.8%
2020	50,474		14.6%
U.S. Decennial Census

=== 2020 census ===
As of the 2020 census, Columbus had a population of 50,474. The median age was 36.2 years. 24.1% of residents were under the age of 18 and 16.1% of residents were 65 years of age or older. For every 100 females there were 95.7 males, and for every 100 females age 18 and over there were 94.7 males age 18 and over.

98.4% of residents lived in urban areas, while 1.6% lived in rural areas.

There were 20,566 households in Columbus, of which 31.8% had children under the age of 18 living in them. Of all households, 46.1% were married-couple households, 19.7% were households with a male householder and no spouse or partner present, and 26.9% were households with a female householder and no spouse or partner present. About 30.1% of all households were made up of individuals and 11.6% had someone living alone who was 65 years of age or older.

There were 22,110 housing units, of which 7.0% were vacant. The homeowner vacancy rate was 1.1% and the rental vacancy rate was 10.0%.

Racial composition as of the 2020 census
Race	Number	Percent
White	37,561	74.4%
Black or African American	1,552	3.1%
American Indian and Alaska Native	197	0.4%
Asian	5,228	10.4%
Native Hawaiian and Other Pacific Islander	31	0.1%
Some other race	2,431	4.8%
Two or more races	3,474	6.9%
Hispanic or Latino (of any race)	4,851	9.6%

=== 2010 census ===
As of the census of 2010, there were 44,061 people, 17,787 households, and 11,506 families residing in the city. The population density was 1,602.2 inhabitants per square mile (618.6/km^{2}). There were 19,700 housing units at an average density of 716.4 per square mile (276.6/km^{2}). The racial makeup of the city was 86.9% White, 2.7% African American, 0.2% Native American, 5.6% Asian, 0.1% Pacific Islander, 2.5% from other races, and 2.0% from two or more races. Hispanic or Latino of any race were 5.8% of the population.

There were 17,787 households, of which 33.5% had children under the age of 18 living with them, 48.5% were married couples living together, 11.7% had a female householder with no husband present, 4.5% had a male householder with no wife present, and 35.3% were non-families. 29.7% of all households were made up of individuals, and 11.5% had someone living alone who was 65 years of age or older. The average household size was 2.43 and the average family size was 3.00.

The median age in the city was 37.1 years. 25.2% of residents were under the age of 18; 8.1% were between the ages of 18 and 24; 27.3% were from 25 to 44; 24.9% were from 45 to 64; and 14.4% were 65 years of age or older. The gender makeup of the city was 48.4% male and 51.6% female.

=== 2000 census ===
As of the census of 2000, there were 39,059 people, 15,985 households, and 10,566 families residing in the city. The population density was 1,505.3 inhabitants per square mile (581.2/km^{2}). There were 17,162 housing units at an average density of 661.4 per square mile (255.4/km^{2}). The racial makeup of the city was 91.32% White, 2.71% Black or African American, 0.13% Native American, 3.23% Asian, 0.05% Pacific Islander, 1.39% from other races, and 1.19% from two or more races. 2.81% of the population were Hispanic or Latino of any race.

There were 15,985 households, out of which 31.8% had children under the age of 18 living with them, 51.9% were married couples living together, 11.0% had a female householder with no husband present, and 33.9% were non-families. 29.1% of all households were composed of individuals, and 10.7% had someone living alone who was 65 years of age or older. The average household size was 2.39, and the average family size was 2.94.

In the city, the population was spread out, with 25.7% under the age of 18, 8.0% from 18 to 24 years, 29.5% from 25 to 44 years, 23.0% from 45 to 64 years, and 13.7% over the age of 65. The median age was 36 years. There were 92.8 males for every 100 females and 89.6 males for every 100 females over age 18.

The median income for a household in the city was $41,723, and the median income for a family was $52,296. Males had a median income of $40,367 versus $24,446 for females, and the per capita income was $22,055. About 6.5% of families and 8.1% of the population were below the poverty line, including 9.7% of those under age 18 and 8.8% of those age 65 or over.

== Arts and culture ==
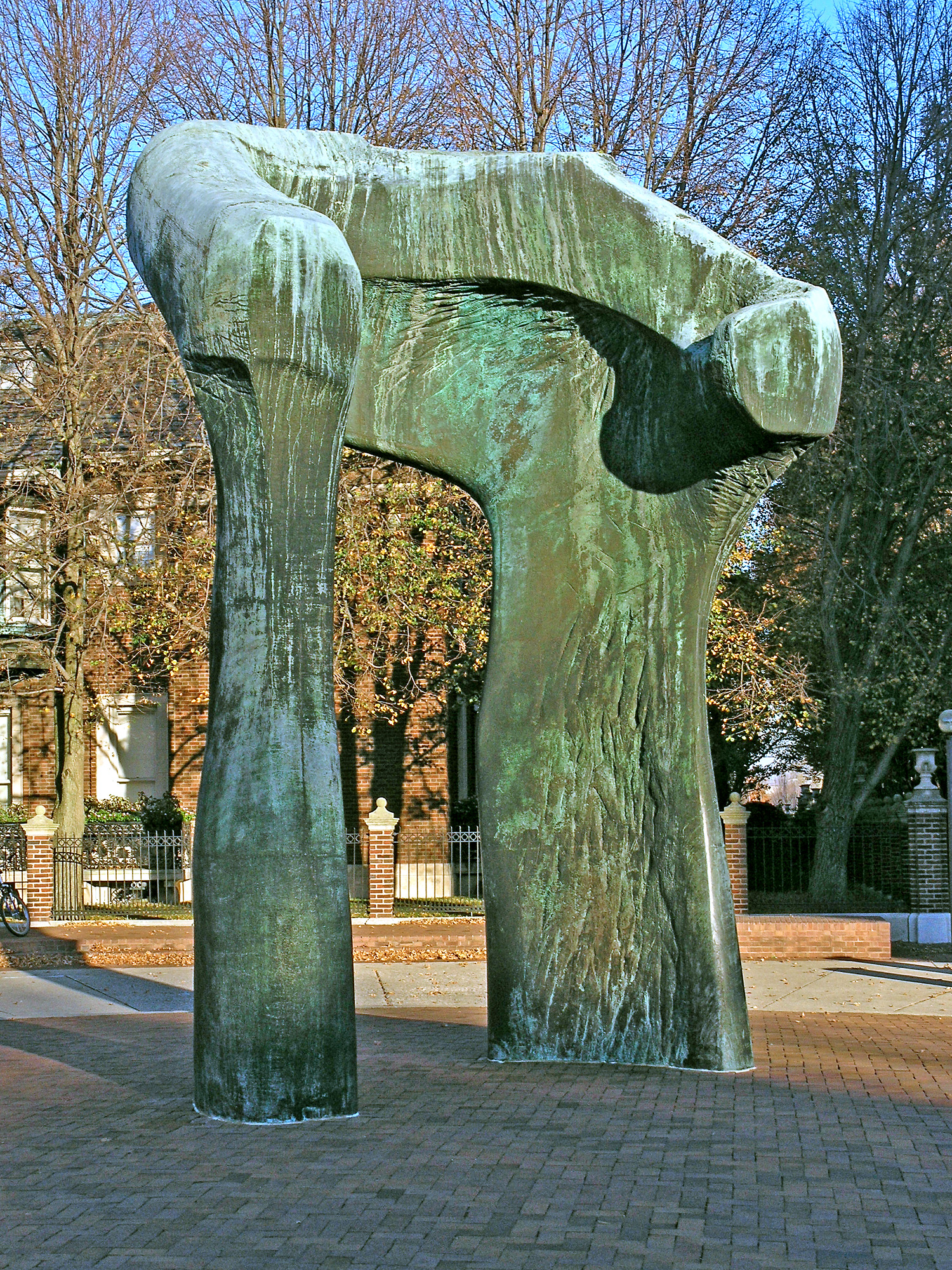
Henry Moore's Large Arch

Columbus is a city known for its modern architecture and public art. J. Irwin Miller, 2nd CEO and a nephew of a co-founder of Cummins, the Columbus-headquartered diesel engine manufacturer, instituted a program in which the Cummins Foundation paid the architects' fees, provided the client selected a firm from a list compiled by the foundation. The plan was initiated with public schools and was so successful that the foundation decided to offer such design support to other non-profit and civic organizations. The high number of notable public buildings and public art in the Columbus area, designed by such individuals as Eero Saarinen, I. M. Pei, Robert Venturi, César Pelli, and Richard Meier, led to Columbus earning the nickname "Athens on the Prairie". National Public Radio once devoted an article to the town's architecture. In 2015, Landmark Columbus was created as a program of Heritage Fund - The Community Foundation of Bartholomew County.

In addition to the Columbus Historic District and Irwin Union Bank, the city has numerous buildings listed on the National Register of Historic Places. Seven buildings, constructed between 1942 and 1965, are National Historic Landmarks, and approximately 60 other buildings sustain the Bartholomew County seat's reputation as a showcase of modern architecture. Landmarks on the National Register of Historic Places include Bartholomew County Courthouse, Columbus City Hall, First Baptist Church, First Christian Church, Haw Creek Leather Company, Mabel McDowell Elementary School, McEwen-Samuels-Marr House, McKinley School, Miller House, North Christian Church, and The Republic Newspaper Office.

The city is the basis for the 2017 film Columbus by independent filmmaker Kogonada. The film was shot on location in Columbus over 18 days in the summer of 2016.

=== National Historic Landmarks ===
- First Baptist Church was designed by Harry Weese without windows and was dedicated in 1965. Its architectural features include a high-pitched roof and skylight.
- First Christian Church was designed by Eliel Saarinen with a 160-ft (49m) tower and was dedicated in 1942. Among the first Modern religious buildings in America, it includes a sunken terrace and a 900-person sanctuary.
- Irwin Union Bank was designed by Eero Saarinen and includes an addition by Kevin Roche. The building was dedicated in 1954 and is possibly the first financial institution in America to use glass walls and an open floor plan.
- The Mabel McDowell School opened in 1960 and was designed by John Carl Warnecke early in his career, using his "early comprehensive diverse approach". The architect fee was the second to be funded by the Cummins Engine Foundation.
- The Miller House and Garden was constructed in 1957 and was designed by Eero Saarinen and landscaped by Dan Kiley. One of the few residential designs by Saarinen, the home is an expression of International Style and was built for J. Irwin Miller of the Cummins Engine corporation and foundation.
- North Christian Church was designed by Eero Saarinen and held its first worship in 1964. The hexagonal-shaped building includes a 192-ft (59m) spire and houses a Holtkamp organ.
- The Republic Newspaper Office was designed by Myron Goldsmith at SOM.

==== Other notable Modern buildings ====
- St. Bartholomew Catholic Church, by William Browne Jr. and Steven Risting
- Cleo Rogers Memorial Library, by I. M. Pei
- Columbus East High School, by Romaldo Giurgola
- Commons Centre and Mall, by César Pelli
- St. Peter's Lutheran Church, by Gunnar Birkerts
- Lincoln Elementary School, by Gunnar Birkerts
- Otter Creek Golf Course, by Harry Weese
- Fire Station Number 4, by Robert Venturi
- Columbus Regional Hospital, by Robert A.M. Stern

==== Notable historic buildings ====
- Bartholomew County Courthouse by Isaac Hodgson
- Columbus Power House by Harrison Albright
- The Crump Theatre by Charles Franklin Sparrell

=== Other points of interest ===
- Bartholomew County Annex building
- Zaharakos Ice Cream Parlor

=== Public art ===
- Chaos I by Jean Tinguely
- Friendship Way by William A. Johnson, containing an untitled neon sculpture by Cork Marcheschi
- Irwin Gardens at the Inn at Irwin Gardens
- Large Arch by Henry Moore
- 2 Arcs de 212.5˚ by Bernar Venet
- Horses by Costantino Nivola
- The Family by Harris Barron
- Yellow Neon Chandelier and Persians by Dale Chihuly
- C by Robert Indiana
- Sermon on the Mount by Loja Saarinen and Eliel Saarinen
- History and Mystery by William T. Wiley
- Exploded Engine by Rudolph de Harak
- Eos by Dessa Kirk

=== Exhibit Columbus ===
In May 2016, Landmark Columbus launched Exhibit Columbus as a way to continue the ambitious traditions of the past into the future. Exhibit Columbus features annual programming that alternates between symposium and exhibition years.

== Sports ==
Columbus High School was home to footwear pioneer Chuck Taylor, who played basketball in Columbus before setting out to promote his now famous shoes and the sport of basketball before being inducted into the Naismith Memorial Basketball Hall of Fame.

Two local high schools compete within the state in various sports. Columbus North and Columbus East both have competitive athletics and have many notable athletes who go on to compete in college and beyond. Columbus North High School houses one of the largest high school gyms in the United States. CNHS vs CEHS

The Indiana Diesels of the Premier Basketball League play their home games at the gymnasium at Ceraland Park, with plans to move to a proposed downtown sports complex in the near future. Similarly, the Indiana Sentinels of the Federal Prospects Hockey League play their home games at Hamilton Community Center & Ice Arena with plans to move to a newer, larger arena by 2029.

== Parks and recreation ==
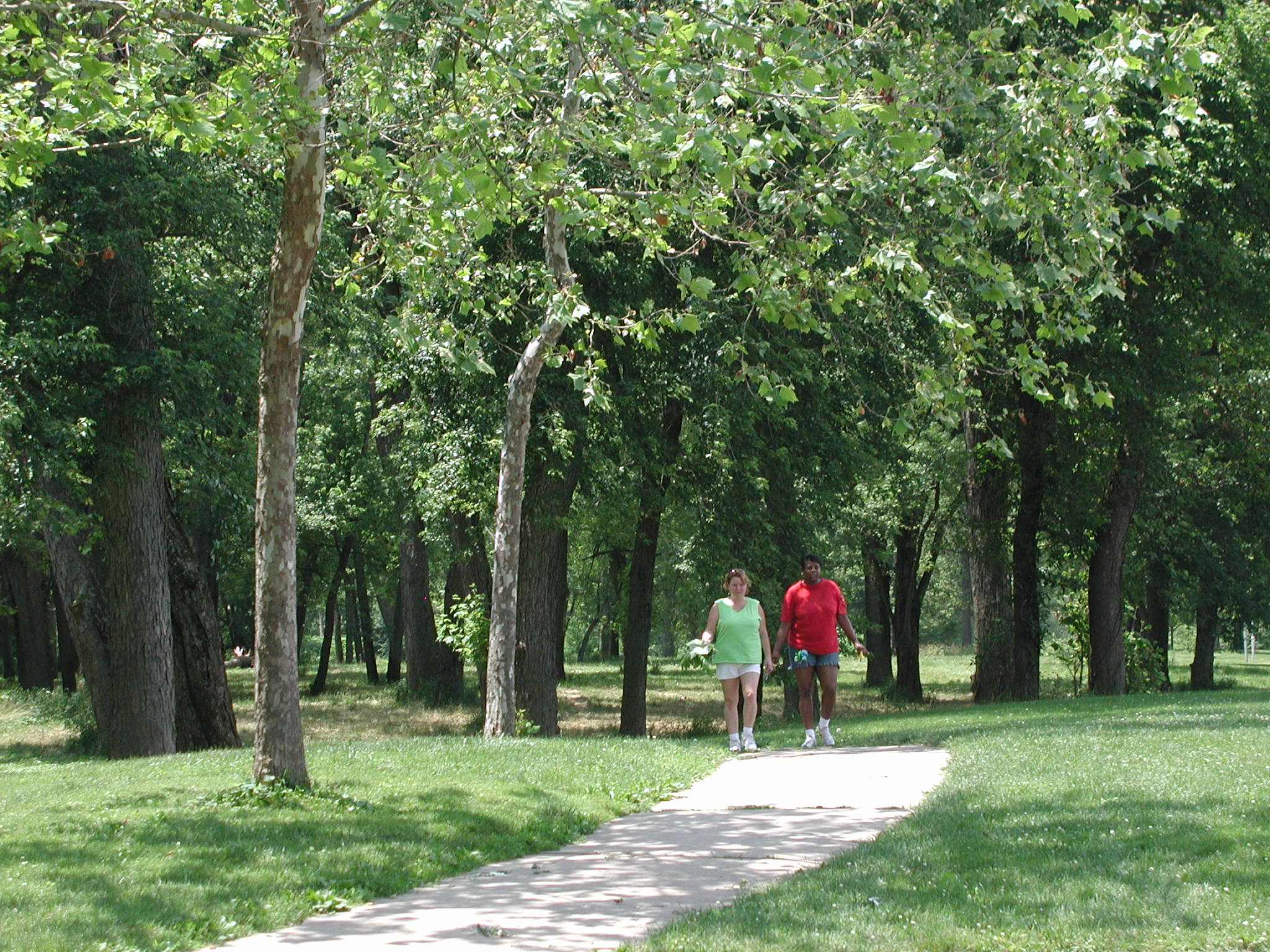
Mill Race Park

Columbus boasts over 700 acres (280 ha) of parks and green space and over 20 miles (32 km) of People Trails. These amenities, in addition to several athletic and community facilities, including Donner Aquatic Center, Lincoln Park Softball Complex, Hamilton Center Ice Arena, Clifty Park, Foundation for Youth/Columbus Gymnastics Center and The Commons, are managed and maintained by the Columbus Parks and Recreation Department.

In May 2021, the former Fair Oaks Mall property was renamed NexusPark as part of its redevelopment into a health, wellness, and recreation campus.

== Transportation ==
=== Transit ===
ColumBUS provides bus service in the city with five routes operating Monday through Saturday.

=== Roads and highways ===
The north–south U.S. Route 31 has been diverted to the northeastern part of the city. Interstate 65 bypasses Columbus to the west. Indiana Route 46 runs-east-west through the southern section of the city.

=== Railroads ===
Freight rail service is provided by the Louisville and Indiana Railroad (LIRC). The LIRC line runs in a north–south orientation along the western edge of Columbus.

The Pennsylvania Railroad's Kentuckyian (Chicago-Louisville) made stops in the city until 1968. The PRR and its successor, the Penn Central, ran the Florida-bound South Wind up to 1971.

The city has been earmarked as a location for a new Amtrak station along the Chicago-Indianapolis-Louisville rail corridor.

=== Airport ===
Columbus is served by the Columbus Municipal Airport (KBAK). It is located approximately 3 miles (4.8 km) north of Columbus. The airport handles approximately 40,500 operations per year, with roughly 87% general aviation, 4% air taxi, 8% military and less than 1% commercial service. The airport has two concrete runways; a 6,401-foot runway with approved ILS and GPS approaches (Runway 5-23) and a 5,001-foot crosswind runway (Runway 14-32) also with GPS approaches.

The nearest commercial airport which currently has scheduled airline service is Indianapolis International Airport (IND), located approximately 55 miles (89 km) northwest of Columbus. Louisville Muhammad Ali International Airport and Cincinnati/Northern Kentucky International Airport are 78 miles (126 km) to the south and 83 miles (134 km) to the southeast, respectively.

== Notable people ==
This is a list of notable people who were born in, or who currently live, or have lived in Columbus.

- Ross Barbour and Don Barbour, singers in the Four Freshmen
- Michael Evans Behling, actor
- Kate Bruce, silent-film actress
- Clessie Cummins, inventor, mechanic, salesman, and founder of engine manufacturer Cummins
- William H. Donner, businessman, industrialist and philanthropist
- Tyler Duncan, golfer
- Dutch Fehring, Major League Baseball player and Purdue coach
- Arthur W Graham III, creator of the first fully automatic electronic race timing & scoring system, long-time Indy 500 executive race official
- Lee H. Hamilton, member of U.S. Congress and co-chair of the 9/11 Commission
- Jordan Bryce Hutson, gospel musician
- Jamie Hyneman, former host of MythBusters
- Blair Kiel, Notre Dame and pro football quarterback
- Debbi Lawrence, race walker
- Scott McNealy, chairman and co-founder of Sun Microsystems
- Dusty Miller, trade union official.
- J. Irwin Miller, industrialist, CEO of Cummins
- Mike Moore, Minor League Baseball president
- Jeff Osterhage, television and film actor
- Bob Paris, best-selling author, award-winning public speaker and social change agent, former Mr. Universe
- Greg Pence, U.S. representative from 2019 to 2025, older brother of Mike Pence
- Mike Pence, 50th Governor of Indiana (2013–2017) and 48th Vice President of the United States (2017–2021)
- Mike Phipps, Purdue All-American and #3 draft pick, NFL quarterback (Browns and Bears)
- Frank Richman, Justice of the Indiana Supreme Court, judge at the Nuremberg trials
- Terry Schmidt, NFL cornerback
- Stephen Sprouse, fashion designer
- Tony Stewart, auto racing driver and team owner, 1997 IndyCar Series Champion, 2 time USAC champion, 3-time NASCAR Cup Series Champion, owner of NASCAR team Stewart Haas Racing and NHRA team Tony Stewart Racing
- Jill Tasker, television and voice actor
- Chuck Taylor, shoe designer
- Bruce Tinsley, creator of Mallard Fillmore
- Herbert Wright, producer
- Stevie Brown, NFL cornerback

== Education ==
The Bartholomew Consolidated School Corporation (BCSC) is the local school district. High schools include:

- Columbus East High School
- Columbus North High School

Columbus has a public library, a branch of the Bartholomew County Public Library.

Secondary education includes Indiana University Columbus (IU Columbus), an Ivy Tech campus, a Purdue Polytechnic campus, and an Indiana Wesleyan University education center.

== See also ==
- The Republic, daily newspaper based in Columbus
- List of public art in Columbus, Indiana
- Columbus, a 2017 American film set in Columbus, Indiana

== Sources ==
- Illustrated Historical Atlas of Bartholomew County, Indiana, 1879 (reprinted by the Bartholomew County Historical Society, 1978)
- 2003 History of Bartholomew County, Indiana, Volume II, copyright 2003, by the Bartholomew County Historical Society
