= Bartholomew County Annex building =

Governmental building in Columbus, Indiana

Bartholomew County Annex Building
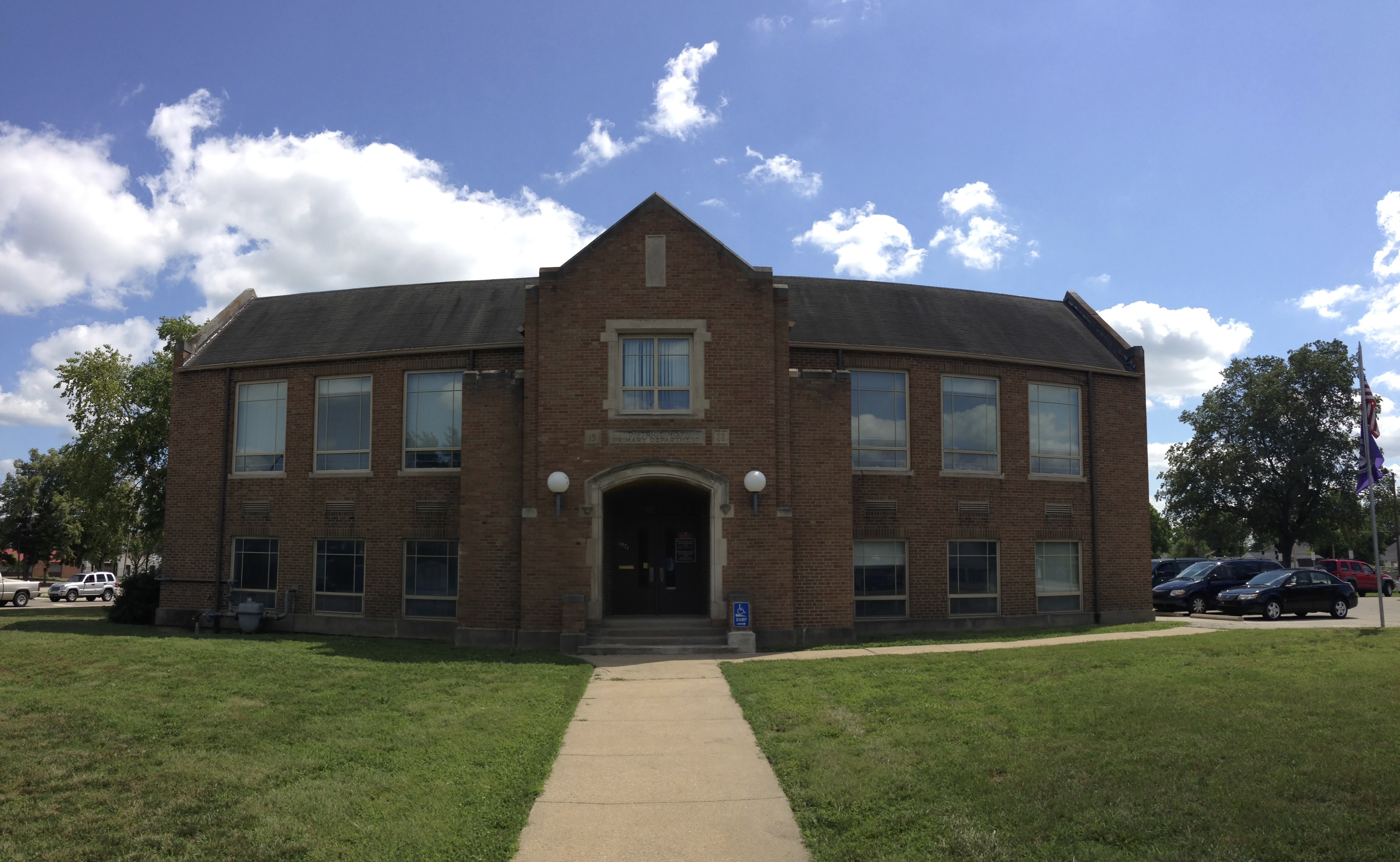
- Bartholomew County Annex building as seen from State Street
- Interactive map of the Bartholomew County Annex Building area
- Former names: State Street School

General information
- Location: 1971 State Street, Columbus, Indiana
- Coordinates: 39.196151°N 85.901697°W
- Construction started: April 21, 1928
- Completed: December 21, 1928
- Cost: $36,500
- Owner: Bartholomew County

Technical details
- Structural system: Stone and brick

Design and construction
- Architect: Norman Hill

Website
- http://www.bartholomew.in.gov

The Bartholomew County Annex building, also known as the State Street School, was designed by architect Norman Hill and completed in 1928. The building stands on the northwest corner of State and Pence streets in Columbus, Indiana. From 1928 to the early 1970s it served as an elementary school in the neighborhood of East Columbus under the ownership of Bartholomew County. In the mid-1970s the building began to be used as the County Annex. Today the building houses the Purdue University Extension office, the Bartholomew County Health Department's nursing program and the Women, Infants and Children program. In late 2013 the County paid an Indianapolis-based engineering and architectural firm, DLZ Indiana Inc., to study the cost of rehabilitating the building.

== School history ==
On April 21, 1928, a bond of $36,500 was issued by the Columbus Township Trustee for the erection of a new school building and the remodeling of the existing building. This new building was to be built to the east and in close proximity to the existing school, which also received remodeled floors, stairways, lighting, and indoor plumbing.

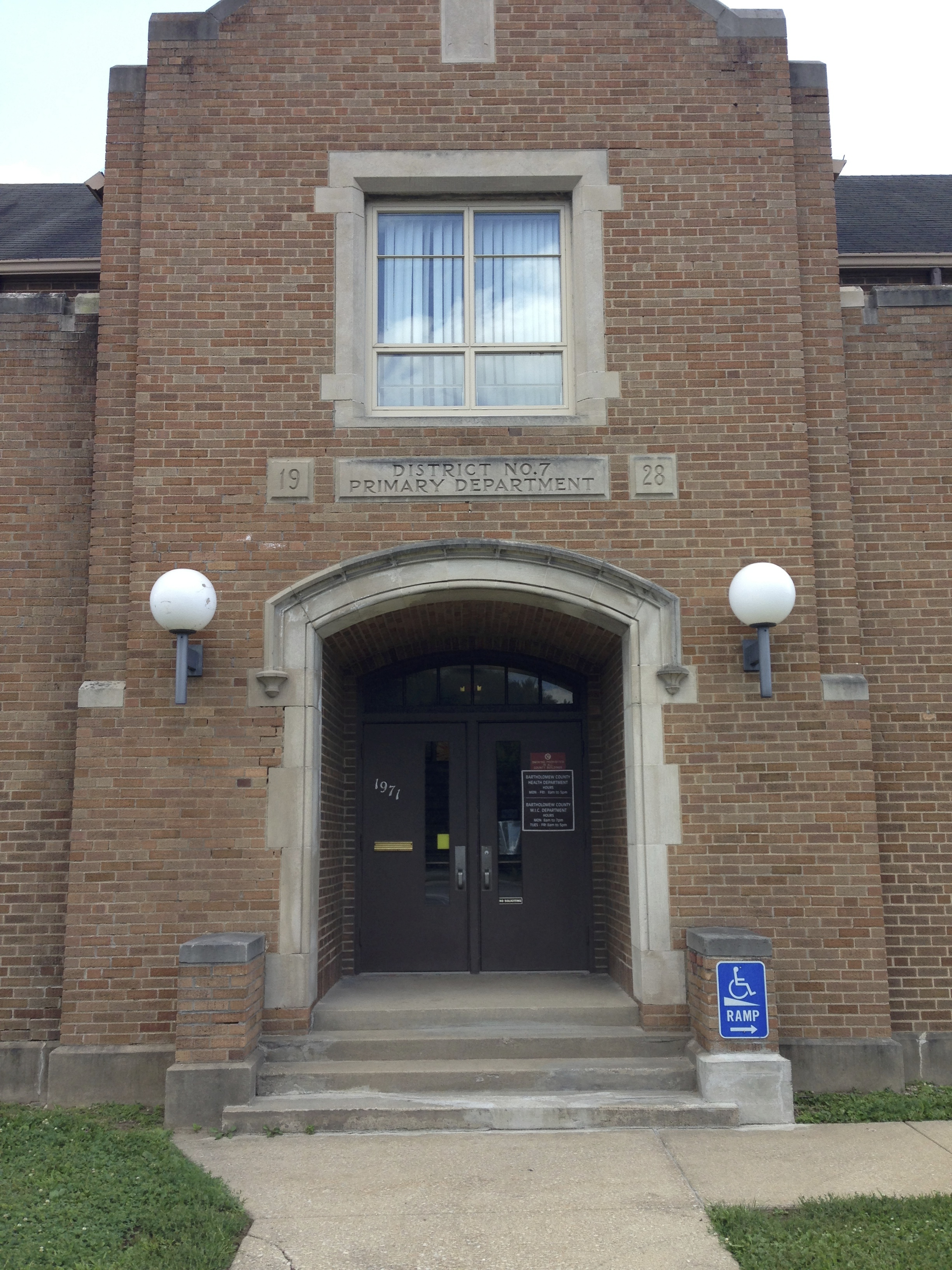
Main entrance to the Bartholomew County Annex building as seen from State Street

When this building was finished in 1928, it would have stood next to another two-story brick building that was built in 1905. Together these two buildings made up the elementary school (grades 1–3 being housed in this building, and 4–6 being housed in the 1905 building).

These two schools remained in operation for more than 40 years in the community. Students from these schools would have advanced to what was then called Central Junior High School, which was demolished in 2009.

The architect of the building, Norman Hill, also remodeled the Bartholomew County Courthouse (1928) and built the Central School gymnasium (1923), the Wilson School building (1923). In Indianapolis, Indiana he made an addition to the Central Christian Church (1920); the Ohio Theatre (1919); and a library in Paoli, Indiana (1915–1917).
