= Bonnie Lynn Tempesta =

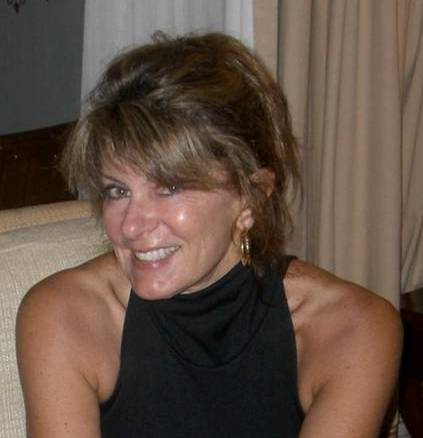
Bonnie Tempesta, known as the "Queen of Biscotti".

Bonnie Lynn Tempesta (née Bonnie Lynn Marcheschi; January 5, 1953 – September 25, 2014) was an American baker and businesswoman who helped pioneer the gourmet food movement in the United States. Called "the Queen of Biscotti." Tempesta "effectively started the national biscotti craze."

== Biography ==
With her mother Aurora Marcheschi, Tempesta founded La Tempesta Bakery Confections in 1983. The bakery grew to become the largest biscotti maker in America, producing 300,000 biscotti cookies daily and generated annual revenues approaching $9 million by 1995.

In 1982, Tempesta used her Florentine aunt Isa Romoli's recipe to produce biscotti — the flat, crunchy, twice-baked cookies traditionally used by Italians to dunk in wine or espresso. Baking them from home, she began selling them to her employer at Confetti, a downtown San Francisco chocolate shop. With a $15,000 loan from her brother, Cork Marcheschi, "a noted neon light sculptor," Tempesta rented a 200-square-foot (19 m^{2}) commercial kitchen in South San Francisco. She began producing a long, thin biscotti known as "biscotti di Prato" and sold them door-to-door to San Francisco’s specialty food shops.

By 1984, La Tempesta biscotti were available at Neiman Marcus and Lord & Taylor, followed by Bloomingdales, Macy’s and Dean & Deluca. In 1985, La Tempesta developed Cioccolotti, the first commercially sold chocolate-dipped biscotti.

In 1992, La Tempesta’s Biscotti di San Francisco made the Washington Times 10 Best New Products list, and The Washington Post rated it the number one domestic brand. Collaborations with renowned San Francisco chocolatier Joseph Schmidt followed. In 1994, Tempesta created the non-profit Teen Inspiration Foundation. In December 1997, La Tempesta was sold to Horizon Food Groups.

In 2012, Bonnie started a small, philanthropic baking company in Kenwood, California, called Boncora (the name Boncora is derived from Bonnie's name, “Bon,” and “ancora,” which means encore in Italian). Her handmade Tuscan-style almond cookies are twice-baked in the regional style of the famous Biscotti di Prato of Prato, Italy. Los Angeles Times Food Editor Russ Parsons called Boncora Biscotti "dynamite" in his Daily Dish column on September 14, 2012. She donated a portion of every sale to a favorite cause: Pets Lifeline of Sonoma County, a local nonprofit animal rescue organization.

Tempesta died on September 25, 2014, at her home in Sonoma, after a brief battle with cancer. She was age 61. Boncora baking company in Kenwood remained open until April 2016, with her daughter Daniela A. Tempesta leading the business.
