= Columbus Regional Health =

Coordinates: 39°13′05″N 85°53′46″W

Geography
- Location: Columbus, Indiana, United States

Services
- Beds: 225

History
- Opened: 1917

Links
- Website: www.crh.org
- Lists: Hospitals in Indiana

Columbus Regional Health (CRH) is a regional health care system located in Columbus, Indiana, United States. The health system's primary location, Columbus Regional Hospital, was founded as Bartholomew County Hospital in 1917 and later renamed in 1992 to Columbus Regional Hospital. In the fall of 2011, the organization introduced Columbus Regional Health as the new name for the hospital and health system. Columbus Regional Health serves a 10-county region in southeastern Indiana. The hospital has 1,650 employees and over 225 physicians providing emergency and surgical services and comprehensive care in numerous specialty areas.

48th Vice president of United States Mike Pence was born in Bartholomew County Hospital on 7 June 1959

== Facilities ==
The Columbus Regional Health system includes multiple facilities:

- Columbus Regional Hospital, Columbus, Indiana
- Columbus Adult Medicine, Columbus, Indiana
- Columbus Diagnostic Imaging, Columbus, Indiana
- Columbus ENT & Allergy, Columbus, Indiana
- Columbus Family Medicine, Columbus, Indiana
- Columbus Gynecology, Columbus, Indiana
- Columbus Internal Medicine Associates, Columbus, Indiana
- Columbus Pediatric Associates, Columbus, Indiana
- Doctors Park Family Medicine, Columbus, Indiana
- Hospital Care Physicians, Columbus, Indiana
- Kavelman Family Medicine, Columbus, Indiana
- Koopman Family Medicine, Columbus, Indiana
- Mental Health Services, Columbus, Indiana
- Nashville Family Medicine, Columbus, Indiana
- Neurology and Sleep Sciences, Columbus, Indiana
- OB/GYN Associates of Columbus, Columbus, Indiana
- Our Hospice of South Central Indiana, Columbus, Indiana
- PromptMed, Columbus, Indiana
- Rau Family Medicine, Columbus, Indiana
- Sandcrest Family Medicine, Columbus, Indiana
- Southern Indiana Heart and Vascular, Columbus, Indiana
- Southern Indiana OB/GYN, Columbus, Indiana
- Southern Indiana Nephrology and Hypertension, Columbus, Indiana
- Speech Therapy & Audiology, Columbus, Indiana
- VIMCare Clinic, Columbus, Indiana
- WellConnect, Columbus, Indiana
- Wound Center, Columbus, Indiana

== Specialties ==
CRH medical specialties include:

- Pulmonology
- Orthopedics
- Cardiology & Heart Surgery
- Gastroenterology & GI Surgery
- Bariatrics
- Cancer
- Breast Health
- Robotic Surgery

== 2008 Flood ==
June 7, 2008, CRH experienced a flood of historic magnitude, causing severe damage to the hospital. The flood prompted the evacuation of 157 patients, and forced the hospital to shut down, with damages totaling over $180 million. Due to the flood, certain areas had been destroyed such as the laboratory, pharmacy, information services, food services, and mechanical and electrical systems.

An interim emergency department was opened up in August 2008, and on October 27, Columbus Regional Hospital reopened with a new and improved facility.

In 2012, the Federal Emergency Management Agency backed a project to protect CRH from any future flooding. 15 flood gates were installed around the campus in order to keep water out. Today, CRH is a fully functioning, 225-bed not-for-profit, providing emergency and surgical services and comprehensive care.

== WellConnect ==
In 2014, Columbus Regional Health opened up a new walk-in clinic called WellConnect in the downtown area of Columbus, Indiana. In an effort to keep up with the times, CRH decided to create a new facility with a different approach on delivering health care services. The result was derived from focus groups and surveys, to the benefit of those living in the downtown area.

WellConnect is a place where patients can meet with wellness experts and healthcare professionals. They offer walk-in care for minor illnesses, wellness programs, massage therapy, and cooking demonstrations. It is open to the public, Monday through Friday.

== Awards and recognition ==
In 2014, CRH received an award for Excellence in Supply Chain Management from VHA Inc.

The Indiana Chamber of Commerce added Columbus Regional Health to Indiana's Best Places to Work Hall of Fame in 2014.

== See also ==
- Official website
