= Columbus North High School =

Public school in Indiana, United States

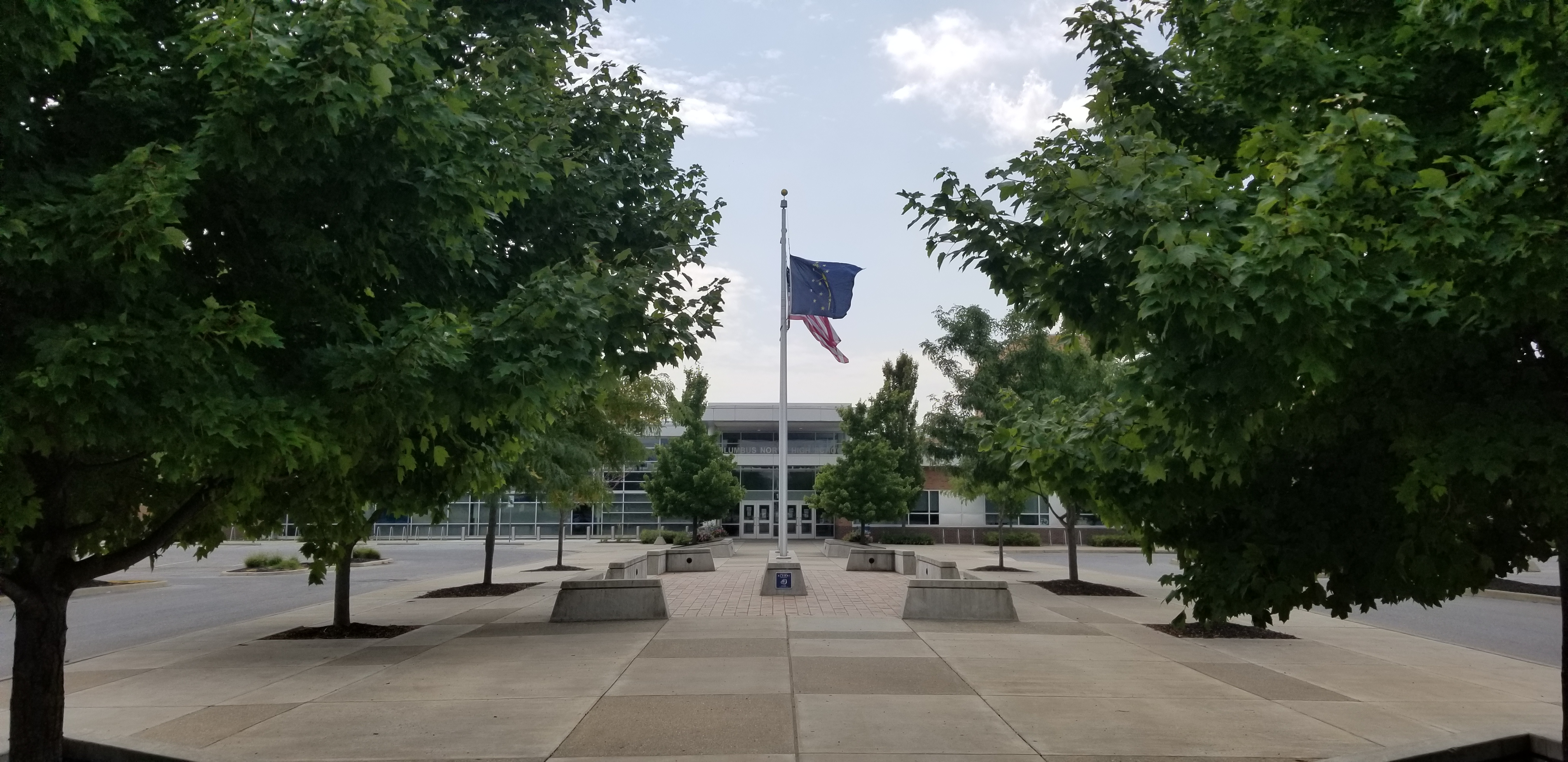
- Main entrance to Columbus North High School

Location
- 1400 25th Street; Columbus, Indiana 47201; United States; 39°13′28″N 85°54′36″W

Information
- Type: Public high school
- Motto: Respect. Responsibility. Relationships.
- School district: Bartholomew Consolidated School Corporation
- NCES School ID: 180036000066.
- Principal: David Clark
- Teaching staff: 168.33 (on an FTE basis)
- Enrollment: 2,267 (2023–2024)
- Student to teacher ratio: 13.47
- Color
- Nickname: Bull Dogs
- Website: Official website

Columbus North High School (CNHS) is one of the public high schools located in Columbus, Indiana, United States. It is part of the Bartholomew Consolidated School Corporation (BCSC). Columbus North High School was previously known as Columbus High School. It was renamed Columbus North High School in 1973 upon the founding of Columbus East High School.

== Demographics ==
The demographic breakdown of the students enrolled for the 2021–2022 school year is as follows:

- Male = 48.3%
- Female = 51.7%
- White = 35.5%
- Hispanic = 31.4%
- Asian = 20.7%
- Multiracial = 3.3%
- Black = 8.3%
- Native American / Alaska Native = 0.7%
- Native Hawaiian / Pacific Islander = <0.1%

== Athletics ==
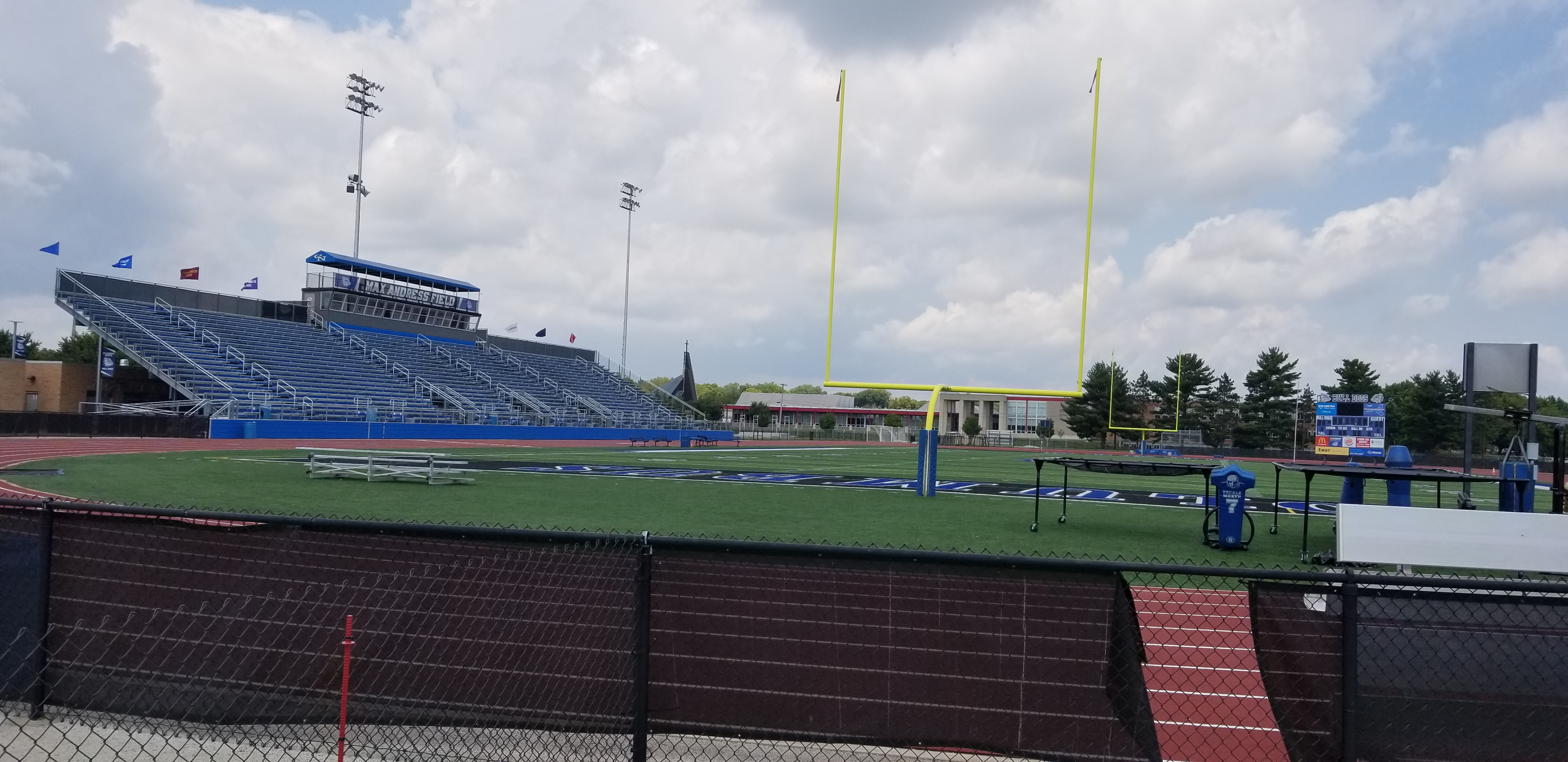
Columbus North Football field

The North Bull Dogs are members of Conference Indiana. The school colors are royal blue and white. The following IHSAA sanctioned sports are offered:

- Baseball (boys)
- Basketball (boys & girls)
- Cross Country (boys & girls)
- Football (boys)
- Golf (boys & girls)
- Gymnastics (girls)
- Soccer (boys & girls)
- Softball (girls)
- Swimming & Diving (boys & girls)
- Tennis (boys & girls)
- Track and Field (boys & girls)
- Volleyball (boys & girls)
- Wrestling (boys & girls)

State Championships
Sport	Year(s)
Girls Basketball (1)	2015
Boys Cross Country (7)	2002, 2003, 2009, 2010, 2011, 2020, 2025
Girls Cross Country (2)	2009, 2021
Boys Golf (2)	1934, 2013
Boys Gymnastics (13)	1967, 1968, 1969, 1970, 1972, 1973, 1975, 1976, 1977, 1978, 1979, 1981, 1982
Girls Gymnastics (3)	1973, 1974, 2016
Boys Soccer (1)	2012
Boys Swimming (10)	1959, 1960, 1961, 1963, 1964, 1965, 1985, 1998, 1999, 2000
Girls Swimming (1)	1985

== Notable alumni ==
- Jason Ayers, WWE referee
- Michael Evans Behling, actor
- Michael Brinegar, American swimmer (attended, did not graduate)
- Tyler Duncan, golfer
- Ray Eddy, former head basketball coach for Purdue
- Jamie Hyneman, co-host of the television series MythBusters
- Devin Mann, 5th Round Draft Pick in 2018 Los Angeles Dodgers
- Ali Patberg, basketball player and coach
- Greg Pence, U.S. Representative for Indiana's 6th congressional district, 2019–2025
- John Pence, attorney
- Mike Pence, 50th Governor of Indiana 2013–2017, 48th Vice President of the United States 2017-2021
- Morgan Proffitt, former Professional soccer player for the Washington Spirit of the National Women's Soccer League.
- Brent Simmons, artistic gymnast
- Tony Stewart, former NASCAR driver, NHRA driver
- Chuck Taylor, American basketball player and shoe salesman/evangelist, Chuck Taylor All-Stars
- Victoria Toensing, class of 1958
- Carl Woszczynski, soccer goalie

== See also ==
- List of high schools in Indiana
