= Bartholomew Consolidated School Corporation =

School district in Indiana

Bartholomew Consolidated School Corporation (BCSC) is a public school district located in Columbus, Indiana, United States. Its boundaries include all but two townships in Bartholomew County, Indiana. BCSC serves 11,000+ students (PreK-12, and Adult Education) on 18 campuses. 11 elementary, 3 high school, 2 middle school, 1 early childhood center, and 1 adult education center. BCSC School Board officers are President Nicole Wheeldon, Vice-President Rich Stenner, and Secretary Todd Grimes. BCSC is led by Superintendent Dr. Chad Phillips.

== History ==
In 1981 The Republic argued that while school closures were difficult for the community, it was understandable that the school district allow a tertiary institution such as Ivy Tech or Indiana University–Purdue University Indianapolis to use school space that is no longer needed.

In 1985 The Republic editorial board praised the board of trustees for selecting Ralph Lieber as the superintendent.

== Demographics ==
- 11,250 students in 18 school buildings
- 59 Languages
- 11.7% of students receive special education services
- 85% of special education students spend at least 80% of their day in gen ed setting
- 44.2% of students receive Free and Reduced Lunch
- 24.9% minority students served
- 15% Limited English Proficiency

== Schools ==
Elementary Schools

- Clifty Creek Elementary
- Columbus Signature Academy--Fodrea Campus
- Columbus Signature Academy--Lincoln Campus
- Mt. Healthy Elementary
- Parkside Elementary
- W.D. Richards Elementary
- Rockcreek Elementary
- L. Francis Smith Elementary
- Lillian C. Schmitt Elementary
- Southside Elementary
- Taylorsville Elementary

Secondary Schools

- Central Middle School and Columbus Signature Academy at Central Campus
- Northside Middle School
- Columbus East High School
- Columbus North High School
- Columbus Signature Academy at New Tech Campus

Other

- C4 Columbus Area Career Connection
- McDowell Educational Center
- Richard L. Johnson Early Education Center
- Columbus Virtual Pathway

== Curriculum ==
Universal Design for Learning: BCSC uses Universal Design for Learning (UDL) as its instructional framework. It optimizes learning by reducing barriers in curricula and supports educators to design appropriately challenging instruction that meets the needs of all learners. The UDL framework also has supported BCSC to align initiatives and resources at the district level, moving from engaging in “random acts of improvement” to a unified vision of school change. All educator professional development must be grounded in UDL principles.

Positive Behavior Instruction and Support: BCSC has established school-based Positive Behavior Instruction and Support (PBIS) teams to ensure that all students have access to the most effective instructional and behavioral practices possible. PBIS supports educators to develop a continuum of scientifically based behavior and academic supports, use data to make decisions and solve problems, arrange the environment to prevent the development and occurrence of problem behavior, teach and encourage pro-social skills and behaviors, implement evidence-based behavioral practices with fidelity and accountability, and monitor student performance and progress continuously. Researchers have suggested PBIS as an effective strategy for addressing racial and ethnic disproportionality in school discipline and the concomitant achievement gaps across racial and ethnic groups (Eber, Upreti, & Rose, 2010).

Educational Pathways: Educational pathways allow students to explore college and career opportunities that align with their interests, strengths, and competencies. Examples include:

- Senior Project: A graduation requirement that calls on students to select a topic, pursue relevant community-based experience, and produce a research paper, project or a product, portfolio, and presentation. Every senior project must demonstrate clear alignment with Indiana's Common Core Standards and demonstrate application of problem solving and authentic, real-world learning.
- Columbus Area Career Connection (C-4): Provides high school students with career and technical education organized into clusters, including: Agricultural Science/Business, Business Management and Finance, Communications, Computer Technology, Construction Engineering Technology, Engineering Manufacturing Technology, Health Careers, Human Services (including Early Childhood Education, Cosmetology, and Culinary Arts), Protective Services, and Transportation.
- Seamless High School Post-Secondary Education: An engineering and advanced manufacturing immersion program featuring aligned courses that feed into Mechanical Engineering degree programs at Indiana University/Purdue University Columbus (IUPUC) and the Purdue University School of Technology, and/or the Advanced Manufacturing program Ivy Tech State College.
- Columbus Signature Academy (CSA): In the first K-12 Project- and Problem-based Learning magnet school in the nation, students work collaboratively using technology to solve authentic problems and create real-world projects.

The school board voted to accept the addition of the "Law in a Free Society", a civics education program, into the curriculum in February 1979.

== External links and resources ==
- BCSC Main Page
- Bartholomew Consolidated School Corporation 2017-2018 Guide
- CAST
- Bartholomew County
