= Bartholomew County Courthouse =

Courthouse in Columbus, Indiana

- U.S. National Register of Historic Places
- U.S. Historic district – Contributing property
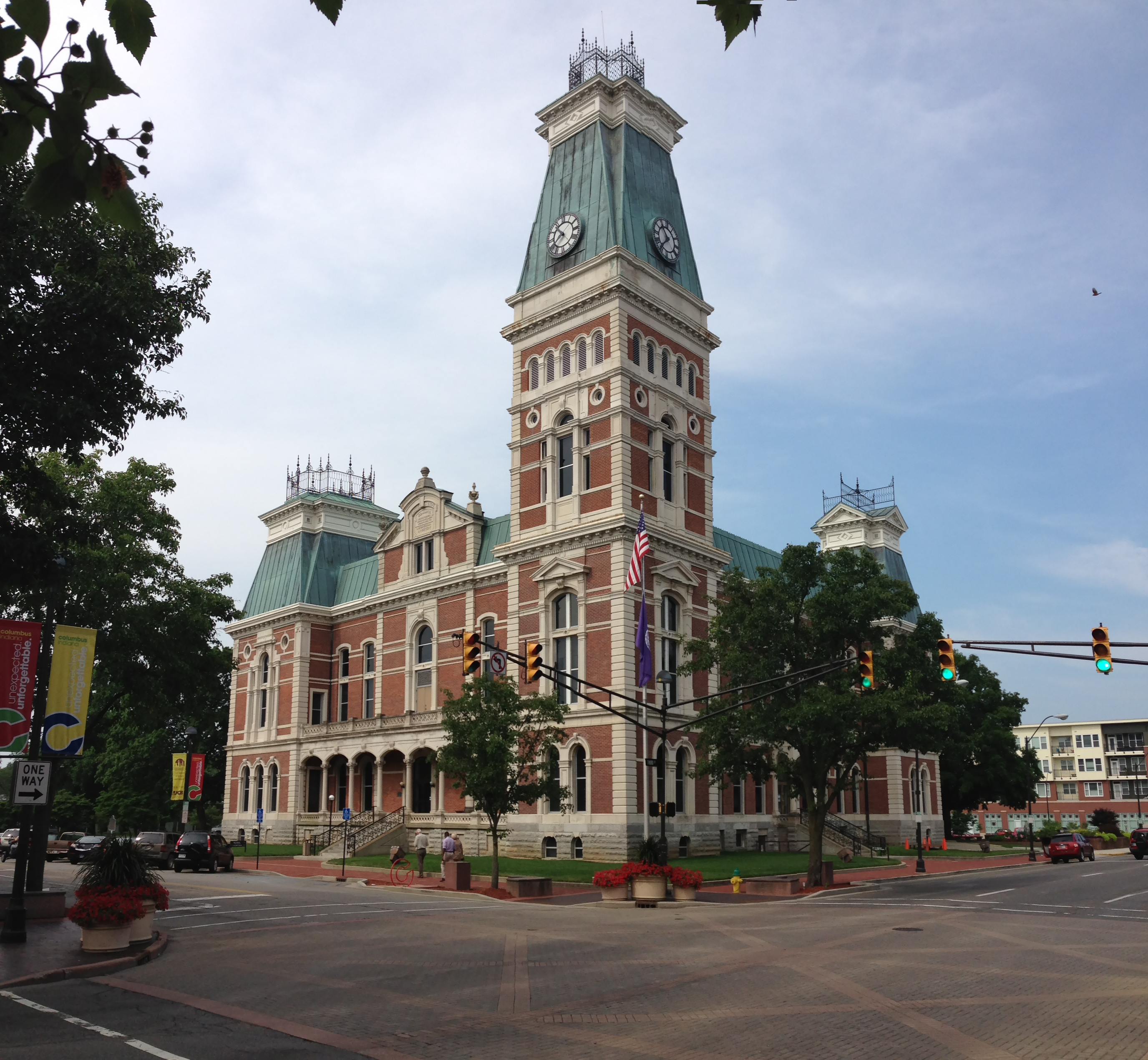
- Location: 3rd and Washington Sts., Columbus, Indiana
- Coordinates: 39°12′4″N 85°55′17″W
- Area: 1.5 acres (0.61 ha)
- Built: 1871-1874
- Architect: Hodgson, Issac
- Architectural style: Second Empire
- Part of: Columbus Historic District (ID82000059)
- NRHP reference No.: 79000031
- Added to NRHP: November 15, 1979

The Bartholomew County Courthouse is a historic courthouse in Columbus, Indiana. It was designed by noted Indiana architect Isaac Hodgson, built in 1871–1874 at the cost of $250,000, and dedicated in 1874. Construction was by McCormack and Sweeny. The building was hailed as "the finest in the West" upon its completion.

It is a three-story, Second Empire-style red-brick building trimmed in limestone. It features a mansard roof, corner pavilions, Corinthian-order portico, and a six-level clock tower. The clock tower is 154 feet tall. A six-inch thick, 10-ten clock bell was installed in 1875. The clock's weighted mechanism were replaced with an electric motor in 1940 and a 900-pound weight fell.

Today the Bartholomew County Veterans Memorial designed by American architect Charles Rose sits adjacent to the Courthouse.

It was added to the National Register of Historic Places on November 15, 1979. It is located in the Columbus Historic District.

== See also ==
- National Register of Historic Places listings in Bartholomew County, Indiana
