= Chaos I =

Kinetic artwork by Jean Tinguely

- Year: 1974
- Dimensions: 910 cm (360 in)
- Location: The Commons, Columbus, Indiana; 39°12′06.8″N 85°55′18.4″W
- Owner: Columbus Park and Recreation Department

Chaos I is a kinetic artwork by Swiss artist Jean Tinguely located inside The Commons, which is downtown Columbus, Indiana, United States. The work was commissioned by J. Irwin Miller, his wife Xenia Miller, and E. Celementine Tangeman (Miller's sister) in late 1971 for The Commons, an enclosed public space designed by Cesar Pelli. The artwork is often simply called Chaos and is occasionally referred to as Chaos No.1.

== Description ==
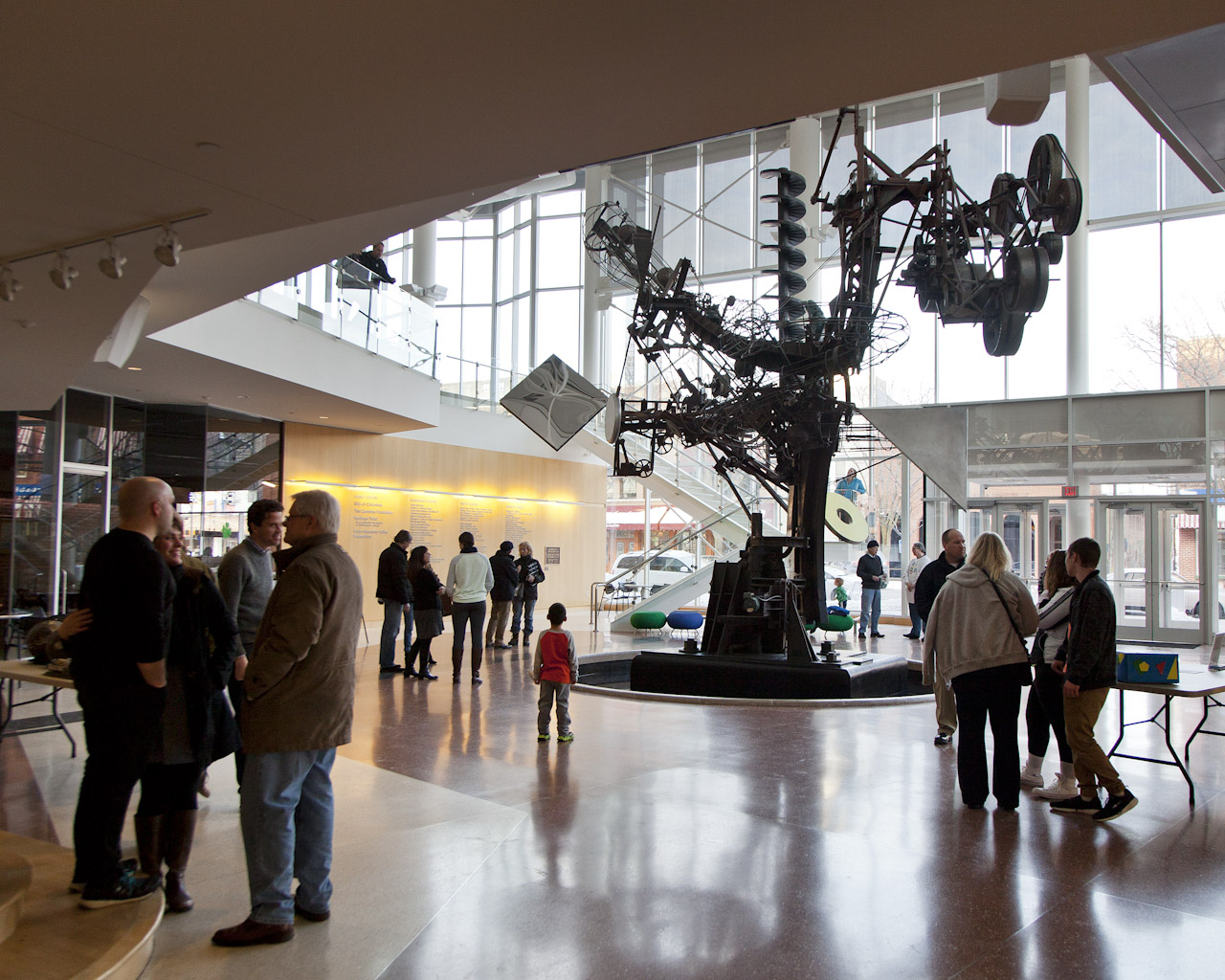
Chaos I as it is today

Chaos I stands 30 feet tall, weighs 3 tons, and originally had 12 motors that operated 13 individual functions. Tinguely designed the artwork to have a “Jekyll and Hyde” personality so visitors could experience it being peaceful, sometimes with only a few functions working, and other times with all of them working and it being noisy and loud.

Chaos I was fabricated from new and scrap material purchased in or from Columbus: scrap metal was acquired from Kroot Corporation, the large bearing used on the base was purchased from Southern Machine, Inc, many of the spinning metal shapes were created by Noblitt Fabricating, and the original 12 motors were provided by Daniel-Hayden Electric Co.

== Historical information ==
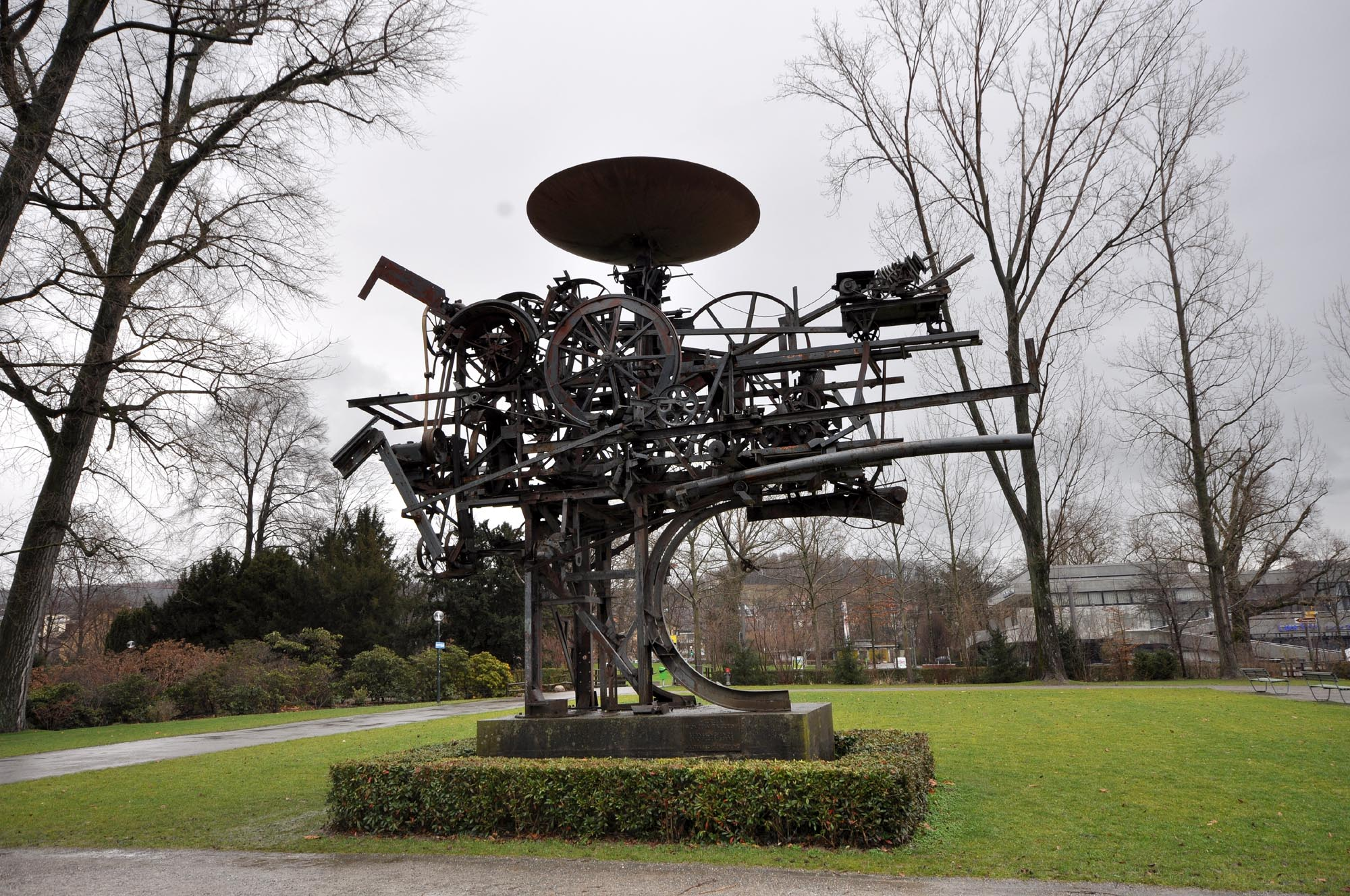
Jean Tinguely's Heureka

The architect for the original building, Cesar Pelli, wanted to have a sculpture in the center of The Commons by Tinguely and with the generosity of two Columbus families, the Millers and Tangemans, this idea became a reality. Pelli envisioned an artwork that would be a meeting place that drew visitors to surprises. Tinguely, who had recently completed a similar sculpture Heureka in Zurich, Switzerland, was Pelli's first and only choice.

The sculpture was made in Columbus, Indiana from 1973 to 1974 by Tinguely and his assistant, Josef Imhof, who constructed the artwork in what was then the Southern Machine Company's shop, the former Columbus Pump House building, located on Second and Lindsey Streets. Many from Columbus helped provide materials and expertise needed to fabricate, transport, and then install the artwork in its present location, where it has always remained.

The Commons was rebuilt in 2011 by Koetter Kim & Associates, but the sculpture remained in place during the building process; it was switched back on June 4, 2011.

== See also ==
- List of public art in Bartholomew County, Indiana
- List of public art in Indiana
