= Rudolph de Harak =

American graphic designer (1924–2002)

- Born: April 10, 1924; Culver City, California
- Died: April 24, 2002 (aged 78); New York City
- Occupation: Graphic designer

Rudolph de Harak, also Rudy de Harak (April 10, 1924 – April 24, 2002), was an American graphic designer. De Harak was notable as a designer who covered a broad spectrum of applications with a distinctly modernist aesthetic. He was also influential as a professor of design.

== Early life and education ==
De Harak was born in Culver City, California. As a child, he moved to Chicago and then New York City to support his sisters' dancing careers, and lived at the Metropolitan Apartments, a large affordable housing project in Astoria, Queens, developed by the Metropolitan Life Insurance Company in the 1920s. De Harak attended a local public middle school P. S. 141 in Queens, followed by the School of Industrial Art in Manhattan. One of de Harak's closest childhood friends was the singer Tony Bennett.

== Career ==
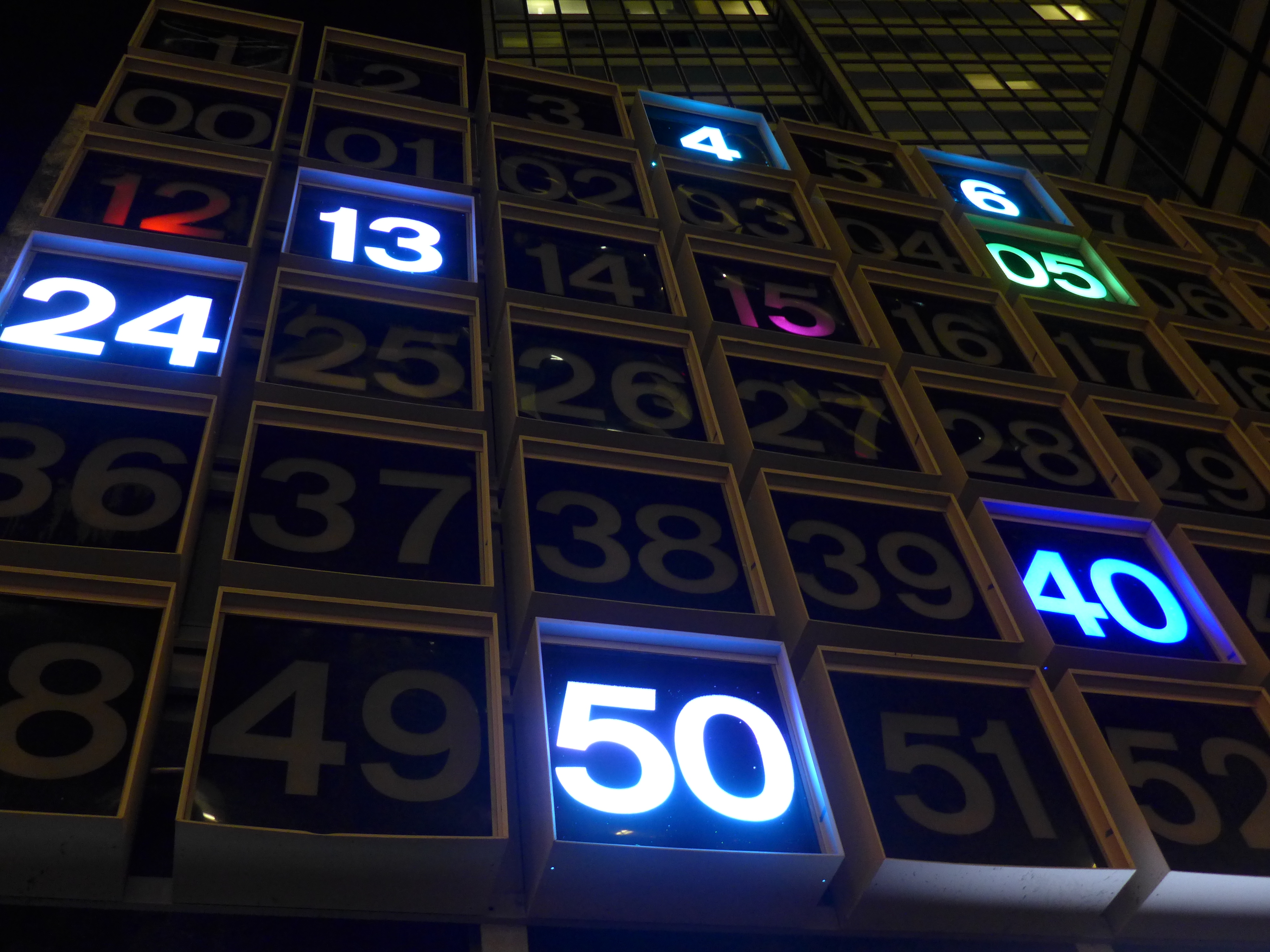
De Harak's digital clock at 200 Water Street

After serving in World War II, de Harak was influenced by two lectures given by Will Burtin and György Kepes which compelled him to pursue graphic design. Along with Saul Bass, Alvin Lustig and others, de Harak helped found the Los Angeles Society for Contemporary Designers before he moved to New York City to become art director for Seventeen for just 18 months. At the same time, de Harak drew illustrations for Esquire and soon began his long tenure in teaching.

De Harak founded New York-based design studio de Harak & Associates in 1950. In 1985 he was joined by designer Richard Poulin, who later became partner and assumed the role of de Harak & Associates’ principal, renaming it as de Harak & Poulin Associates.

De Harak served as the Frank Stanton Professor of Design at the Cooper Union for 25 years, and was visiting professor at Yale University, Alfred University, Parsons, Pratt Institute and other schools.

He designed a three-story digital clock installed on the exterior of 200 Water St. (previously 127 John St.) in New York City. The clock consists of "72 square modules with numerals that light according to date, hour, minute and second". At the time of project completion in 1971, it was the largest clock in the world. He also designed a neon-illuminated entrance and a scaffold covered with brightly covered canvas outside.

Other notable projects by de Harak include the graphic design of the Egyptian Wing of the Metropolitan Museum of Art, “Man, His Planet, and Space” pavilion for Montreal’s Expo 67, and the U.S. Pavilion at Expo 70 in Osaka, Japan, co-designed with Chermayeff & Geismar.

De Harak was a member of the 1989 Art Directors Club Hall of Fame. He was the recipient of a 1992 AIGA Medal.

=== Influences ===
De Harak's work was influenced by modernism and the International Typographic Style. He was also influenced by abstract expressionism, Dada, op art and pop art.

== Notes ==
- Heller, Steven, "Rudolph de Harak, 78, Artist And Environmental Designer", The New York Times, April 30, 2002. The New York Times
- Heller, Steven, "Rudolph de Harak – A Playful Modernist", Baseline 45, edited by Mike Daines and Hans Dieter Reichert, Bradbourne Publishing, 2004.
- Heller, Steven, "A Humanist's Modernist", AIGA Medalists at aiga.org A Humanist's Modernist
- Forester, Russel, "Rudolph de Harak", Graphic Design Archive at rit.edu Rudolph de Harak, Graphic Design Archive at rit.edu
- "Rudolph de Harak", the 1989 Art Directors Club Hall of Fame at adcglobal.org 1989 Art Directors Club Hall of Fame at adcglobal.org
