= Cork Marcheschi =

American artist and musician (born 1945)

- Born: April 5, 1945 (age 81); San Mateo, California, United States
- Education: California College of Arts and Crafts, California State College and CA College of San Mateo
- Occupations: Visual artist and musician
- Known for: Sculptor, musician
- Website: http://corkmarcheschi.net/

Cork Marcheschi (mark-e-ski; born April 5, 1945) is an American sculptor and musician, most notably recognized for his pioneering use of light in sculpture, his large body of public art work, and founding avant-garde psychedelic rock band Fifty Foot Hose. In the words of curator David Ryan, "Through art, music, writing, collecting and teaching, Cork Marcheschi saw the light early on — pursuing it in its many permutations — perfecting his artistry, a sculptural vision now widely admired."

== Early life and education ==
Cork Marcheschi was born on April 5, 1945, to Italian immigrants Luigi and Aurora Marcheschi in San Mateo, California. His sister was Bonnie Lynn Tempesta, a baker and businesswoman who helped pioneer the gourmet food movement.

He enrolled at the College of San Mateo in 1963 to avoid the draft. Prior to enrollment, Marcheschi was training as a disc jockey and sound engineer, which led him to declare a major in telecommunications. He would later switch to art after being introduced to an avant-garde poem by Kurt Schwitters untitled "W" His reputation as a pleasant "outlaw" as described by 2001 exhibition catalogue, "Portrait of an Artist as Outlaw" largely evolved from his struggles with dyslexia. In 1966, he attended California State College in Hayward, California, By 1970, Marcheschi received his MFA and began to teach at Minneapolis College of Art and Design. He relocated from the San Francisco Bay to Minneapolis. Marcheschi obtained a master of fine arts.

== Career ==
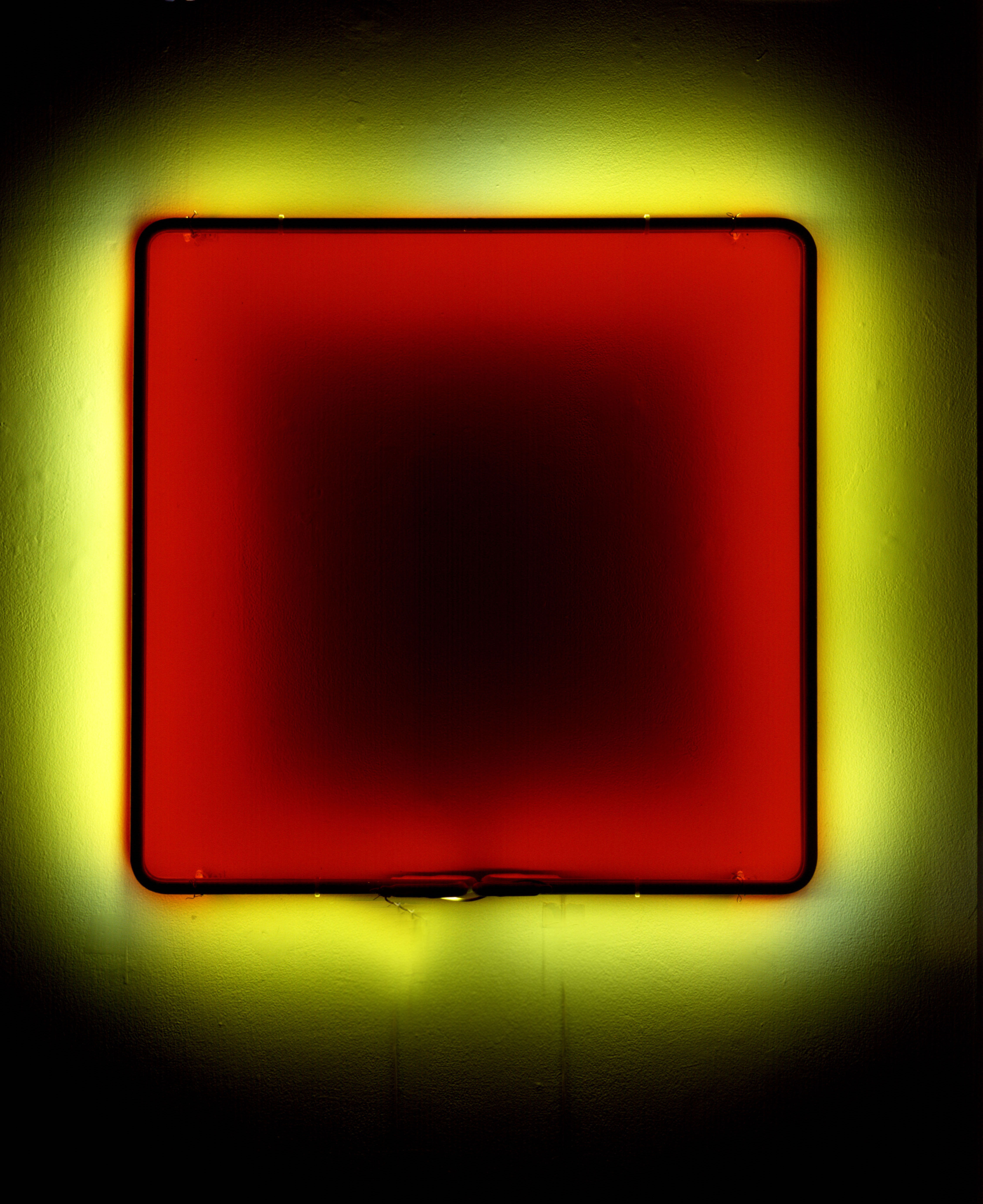

In 1966, Marcheschi enrolled in California State College and began to study art with Mel Ramos and Sy Weisman. In the following year, Marcheschi secured his first one-man show in San Francisco. After discovering the work of Nikola Tesla in 1968, he realized his sole interest in energy as a medium and decided to abandon sculptural objects. Marcheschi achieved this through experimentation with Tesla's work on radio frequency and the transmission of electrical energy without wires. The same year, Marcheschi was featured in a group show at the Sun Gallery in San Francisco. In 1969, he exhibited his first experiential installation at the California College of Arts and Crafts. In 1970 Marcheschi began a teaching position at the Minneapolis College of Art and Design. The following year, Minneapolis Institute of the Arts curator, David Ryan, gave Marcheschi his first museum show at the Minneapolis Institute of the Arts. In 1971, Marcheschi contacted Martin Friedman and was offered a space in the 1971 Walker Art Center opening exhibition. This would be Marcheschi's first national exposure. The show included artists Richard Serra, Mark di Suvero, Donald Judd, Robert Irwin, Robert Morris, Robert Rauschenberg, and Ed Moses. In 1973, Marcheschi met Lou Meisel. Meisel offered him a show at the Louis K. Meisel Gallery in NYC. In 1973 Marcheschi also Joined the stable of Gallerie M in Germany. In the same year, Marcheschi returned to Art Gallery 118 with Night Lights. In 1974, art collector Jim Morgan saw Marcheschi's work at the Meisel Gallery and pursued him for a show in his Kansas City gallery. Marcheschi's first museum acquisition "Dream End" was made by the American Museum of Milwaukee, Wisconsin in 1976. In 1976, he also exhibited at Kunsthalle Düsseldorf and received the Bush Foundation Grant.

In 1977, Marcheschi showed again at the Meisel Gallery and befriended artists Alice Neel and Isabel Bishop. With the Bush Grant Marcheschi was awarded, In 1978 Marcheschi's second museum acquisition was made by the Nelson Gallery. In the same year he executed a clandestine underground show in East Berlin. His solo show developed with the DAAD award made ten stops around Europe, including the Nationalgalerie in Berlin. After Marcheschi's return from Germany in 1979, he began his public art career. He received a letter to submit a proposal for a project in Seattle, Washington and after a round requesting resubmissions from the three finalists, Marcheschi was awarded the commission. For the next three decades, Marcheschi pursued public art commissions, executing and installing nearly fifty large scale pieces around across the United States and China. Since 2010, Marcheschi has worked on multiple projects developing and executing set design for a variety of productions. In 1974, a couple years after making connections with an individual from Voltarc Technologies, Marcheschi fabricated 400 fluorescent tubes to be used on a Canadian television set for magician Doug Henning. In 1978 he created a set for Rick Cluchey of the San Quentin Drama Workshop. In this same year, during Marcheschi's DAAD fellowship in West Berlin, he worked on Robert Wilson production, Death, Destruction, and Detroit creating electrical lightning on the stage. Marcheschi's work with set design concluded in 1978 with a play for the State Theater Company of Hamburg by Augustus Strindberg's Nach Damascus.

== Recognition ==
=== Exhibitions ===
- 2020 Sammlung Hoffmann, Germany
- 2019 Wolfsburg Museum, Germany
- 2011 Braunstein Gallery, SF, Ca.
- 2007 Braunstein Quay Gallery. SF, Ca.
- 2006 Braunstein Quay, SF Ca
- 2002 Braunstein Quay, San Francisco, Ca
- 2002 Museum of Neon Art, Los Angeles
- 2000 Braunstein Quay Gallery, SF. Ca.
- 1999 Gray/McGear Gallery, Los Angeles, Ca.
- 1996-95 Braunstein/Quay Gallery, San Francisco, C
- 1994 CCAC, Oakland, CA
- 1993 Morgan Gallery, Kansas City, MO
- 1992 Braunstein/Quay Gallery, San Francisco, CA
- 1991 Museum Glaskasten, Cologne Germany
- 1989 Schmidt Dean Gallery, Philadelphia, PA
- 1988 Nerlino McGear, NYC
- 1986 New Langton Arts, San Francisco, CA
- 1984 Toledo Museum of Art, Toledo, OH
- 1984 Manheim Kunst Museum, Manheim, West Germany
- 1983 Gallery Aides, West Berlin, West Germany
- 1983 University of California, Irvine Museum, CA
- 1982–83, 71 Minneapolis Institute of Art (Traveling Exhibition), MN
- 1975–82 Morgan Art Gallery, Kansas City, MO
- 1981 Modernism Art Gallery, San Francisco, CA
- 1981 Dobrick Gallery, Chicago, IL
- 1973, 75, 77, 80 Louis K. Meisel Gallery, NYC
- 1980 Rutgers University Art Gallery, New Brunswick, NJ
- 1979 The Fort Worth Museum, Fort Worth, TX
- 1974, 78 Galerie M, Bochum, West Germany
- 1978 Van Abbemuseum, Eindhoven, Netherlands
- 1978 Nationalgalerie, Berlin, West Germany
- 1978 Berliner Künstlerprogramm des DAAD, Berlin, West Germany
- 1977 Hanson-Cowles Gallery, Minneapolis, MN
- 1976 Kunsthalle Düsseldorf, West Germany
- 1975 Folkwang Museum, Essen, West Germany
- 1972–74 118 An Art Gallery, Minneapolis, MN

=== Awards ===
- 1983 NEA – National Endowment for the Arts, (Sculpture)
- 1982 McKnight Foundation Grant
- 1978 DAAD – Berlin Artists Program
- 1977 Bush Foundation Fellowship

== Music ==
Ethix, a five-piece rhythm and blues band, was Marcheschi's first formal musical group. The final group membership consisted of Cork Marcheschi (bass), Bob Noto (guitar), Jonny Picetti (drums), Bill Girst (piano, trumpet), and Ken Metcaff (vocals, saxophone). Ethix started with Friday night gigs at the Shoreview YMCA dances in Burlingame, California. These performances consisted exclusively of rhythm and blues covers such as songs from Chuck Berry, Muddy Waters, Fats Domino, and the Coasters. In 1964, Ethix graduated to San Francisco's North Beach club scene where they started playing off nights at a number of clubs including Tipsys, Off Broadway, The Galaxy, Garden of Eden, the Condor, and the Peppermint Lounge. Later on, Ethix added a trumpet and saxophone to the ensemble to expand their range to play artists like James Brown, Bobby "Blue" Bland, Ray Charles, and Louis Jordan. In 1965 the band made self titled record "Ethix". In the same year, their second record Skopul made the charts. The following year they were awarded gigs at El Rancho and Stardust in Las Vegas after being spotted by a booker in San Francisco club Tipsy's. The group went on to book Pussycat a Go Go in Las Vegas and secured a residency in the city.

== Fifty Foot Hose ==
In 1966 Marcheschi got a call from the San Francisco Musician's Union regarding a need for a casual bass player at a private party that night at San Francisco's Bimbos 365 Club. Marcheschi took the offer and performed with David Blossom and his wife Nancy. The three played two hours of Rock ’n’ Roll and later Fifty Foot Hose was born. Nancy sang, David played guitar and wrote, and Cork played bass and various electronic instruments. In 1967 Marcheschi brought a demo tape to Brian Rohan who later introduced the band to Robin MacBride of Mercury Records.

In 1967, Fifty Foot Hose released their first album "Cauldron", which received a favorable review by Ralph J Gleason. In 1990, "Cauldron" was rereleased and was an instant success, garnering much more attention than its original release. The original group's final performance was a night headlining at San Francisco club Roccapulco. The band reunited for a show in 1994, benefiting San Francisco's Aquarius Music Store, but Marcheschi was the only original member featured.

== Production ==
In addition to Marcheschi's career as a musician, he has produced various albums. Most notable was his production of "Toast" for the Naked Barbie Dolls and Oscar Brown Jr.’s "Then and Now". In 1994, Marcheschi founded his own label, Weasel Disc Records.

== Films ==
=== Survivors ===
In 1982, Marcheschi released Survivors, a documentary on well known blues artists that continue to carry on the blues tradition. Survivors explores the continuation of the blues legacy through the contemporary performance of the music primarily in small clubs and the dedicated fanbase that patronizes it. The film premiered at the London and Berlin international film festivals. It then went on to the Mill Valley Film Festival in California then into general release where it would play at theaters throughout the United States. The film was also purchased by Great Britain's Channel 4.

=== I am the Blues ===
In 1985, Marcheschi released a documentary film in collaboration with the Black Entertainment Network titled "I am the Blues: Willie Dixon”. The film recounts the lasting impact the artist made on the genre and the African American community a whole. The film was very well received and was shown weekly on the Black Entertainment Network once a week for many years.

== Publications ==
- Glueck, Grace; "Decorative Abstraction" New York Times, July 22, 1988
- Berswordt, Cornelia V.; Niemandsland, Kunsthalle Recklinghausen, 1989
- Levin, Gail; Catalogue: Forecasts, Nerlino Gallery, NYC, 1988
- Hall Duncan, Nancy; Catalog, Bruce Museum, CT, 1987
- McClure, Michael; Catalog, Vorpal Gallery, San Francisco, CA, 1987
- Schiess, Christian; Cork Marcheschi, Signs of the Times, pp. 82–87, Oct. 1987
- Tapley, George; “Cork Marcheschi, Exhibition Review, Minneapolis Institute of the Arts”
- Arts Magazine, January 1983
- Nationalgalerie, Berlin; Katalog: Kunst Wird Material, 1982
- Sakane, Itsuo; Catalog: Art In Light and Illusion, The Asahi Shimbun, Tokyo, Japan, 1982
- WORTZ, Melinda; Catalog: Experience at Council Grove, The Minneapolis Institute of Art, 1982
- Buddensieg, Tilmann and Rogge, Henning; Catalog: Die Nützliche Künste, Berlin, 1981
- Nelson, Carole; “Energy, Freedom, Music Keeps Artist Cork Marcheschi Going”, St. Paul Pioneer Press, January 13, 1982, pp. 12–13
- Meier, Peg; “Neon Sculptor Wants to Light Up Our Lives”, Minneapolis Tribune, May 1, 1981, pp. 1C and 4C
- Norklun, Kathi; “Electric Intervals”, ArtWeek, September 1981, p. 6
- Rosenzweig, Solomon, “Light as Art: a Historic Perspective”, Designers West, Lighting, 1981, pp. 154–173
- Wechsler, Jeffrey; Catalog: Cork Marcheschi, Rutgers University Art Gallery, New Jersey
- Thomas, Kathleen; Catalog: Dimensions Variable, The New Museum, NYC, 1979
- Kreutzberg, Siegrid, Catalog: Cork Marcheschi, Schwarze Galerie, Hannover, Germany, 1979
- Marcheschi, Cork; Berlin Burgers, DAAD, Berlin, Germany, 1979
- Hegeman, William R.; “Sculpture to Walk Through”, ArtNews, Jan. 1978, p. 117
- Danoff, Michael; Catalog: Cork Marcheschi/Eric Schwartz: Electricity and Light as Sculpture, Milwaukee Art Center, 1976
- Hepper, Heiner; Cork Marcheschi (film), Germany Public Broadcasting, 1975
- Kruger, Werner; Licht als Skulpturale Form, Art International, November 20, 1975, p. 79
