= Slabtown =

Slabtown may refer to:

== Places ==
- Slabtown, California
- Slabtown, Atlanta, Georgia
- Slabtown, Portland, Oregon
- Homer, Indiana
- Slabtown, Indiana
- North Industry, Ohio
- Slabtown, Pennsylvania
- Slabtown, West Virginia
- Slabtown, Wisconsin
- Slabtown, a residential neighborhood in Traverse City, Michigan

== Entertainment ==
- Slabtown (The Walking Dead), an episode of the fifth season of The Walking Dead
