= Fugit Township, Decatur County, Indiana =

Fugit Township
- Township
- Location of Fugit Township in Decatur County
- Coordinates: 39°24′01″N 85°21′10″W
- Country: United States
- State: Indiana
- County: Decatur

Government
  - Type: Indiana township

Area
  - Total: 43.02 sq mi (111.4 km^{2})
  - Land: 42.66 sq mi (110.5 km^{2})
  - Water: 0.36 sq mi (0.93 km^{2})
- Elevation: 1,070 ft (326 m)

Population (2020)
  - Total: 1,856
  - Density: 43.51/sq mi (16.80/km^{2})
- FIPS code: 18-26098
- GNIS feature ID: 453320

Fugit Township is one of nine townships in Decatur County, Indiana. As of the 2020 census, its population was 1,856 (up from 1,767 at 2010) at and it contained 944 housing units.

Historical population
Census	Pop.	Note	%±
1890	1,605		—
1900	1,538		−4.2%
1910	1,328		−13.7%
1920	1,175		−11.5%
1930	1,171		−0.3%
1940	1,115		−4.8%
1950	1,094		−1.9%
1960	1,071		−2.1%
1970	1,156		7.9%
1980	1,520		31.5%
1990	1,639		7.8%
2000	1,788		9.1%
2010	1,767		−1.2%
2020	1,856		5.0%
Source: US Decennial Census

== History ==
Fugit Township was organized in 1822.

== Geography ==
According to the 2010 census, the township has a total area of 43.02 square miles (111.4 km^{2}), of which 42.66 square miles (110.5 km^{2}) (or 99.16%) is land and 0.36 square miles (0.93 km^{2}) (or 0.84%) is water.

=== Unincorporated towns ===
- Clarksburg
- Lake Santee (part)
- Kingston
- Saint Maurice

(This list is based on USGS data and may include former settlements.)

=== Adjacent townships ===
- Richland Township, Rush County (north)
- Posey Township, Franklin County (northeast)
- Salt Creek Township, Franklin County (east)
- Ray Township, Franklin County (southeast)
- Salt Creek Township (south)
- Washington Township (southwest)
- Clinton Township (west)
- Anderson Township, Rush County (northwest)

=== Cemeteries ===
The township contains two cemeteries: Memorial and Mount Carmel.
