= Germantown =

Germantown or German Town may refer to:

== Places ==
=== Australia ===
- Germantown, Queensland, a locality in the Cassowary Coast Region
- The former name of Grovedale, Victoria, Australia

=== Canada ===
- Germantown, now part of Bridgeland/Riverside, Calgary, Alberta

=== United States ===
- Germantown, California, the former name of Artois, a census-designated place in Glenn County
- Germantown, Connecticut, a neighborhood of Danbury, Connecticut
- Germantown, Illinois, a village in Clinton County
- Germantown, Decatur County, Indiana, an unincorporated town
- Germantown, Iowa, an unincorporated community in O'Brien County
- Germantown, Kentucky, a city in Bracken and Mason counties
- Germantown, Louisville, a neighborhood in Louisville, Kentucky
- Germantown, Anne Arundel County, Maryland, an unincorporated community
- Germantown, Baltimore County, Maryland, an unincorporated community of Perry Hall, Maryland
- Germantown, Maryland, a census-designated place in Montgomery County and the only "Germantown, Maryland" recognized by the United States Postal Service
- Germantown, Worcester County, Maryland, an unincorporated community
- Germantown, Quincy, Massachusetts, a residential neighborhood
- Germantown, Missouri, an unincorporated community
- Germantown (town), New York, a town in Columbia County, New York
- Germantown, Allegany County, New York, a neighborhood of the town of Clarksville
- Germantown, Orange County, New York, a neighborhood of the city of Port Jervis
- Germantown, Nebraska, the former name of the village of Garland
- Germantown, North Carolina, an unincorporated community in Hyde County, North Carolina
- Germantown, Ohio, a city located in Montgomery County, Ohio
- Germantown, Washington County, Ohio, an unincorporated community
- Germantown, Philadelphia, a neighborhood of Philadelphia, former borough
- Colonial Germantown Historic District, in Philadelphia, Pennsylvania, listed on the National Register of Historic Places
- Germantown Township, Pennsylvania, a former unincorporated jurisdiction located mostly in what is now Philadelphia
- Germantown Township, Turner County, South Dakota
- Germantown Historic District, Nashville, listed on the NRHP in Tennessee
- Germantown, Tennessee, a city near Memphis
- Germantown, Virginia, an historic unincorporated rural community in Fauquier County
- Germantown, Wisconsin, a village in Washington County
- Germantown, Juneau County, Wisconsin, a town
- Germantown, Washington County, Wisconsin, a town

== Military ==
- Battle of Germantown, in the American Revolutionary War which took place in what's now Germantown, Philadelphia
- USS Germantown (1846), a sloop-of-war
- USS Germantown (LSD-42), a 1984 Whidbey Island–class dock landing ship

== Other uses ==
- Germantown Academy, in Philadelphia, Pennsylvania, the oldest non-sectarian day school in the United States
- Germantown Colony and Museum, a historical preservation project in Louisiana
- Germantown Cricket Club, a cricket club located in the Germantown neighborhood of Philadelphia, Pennsylvania

== See also ==
- Germantown, Indiana (disambiguation)
- Germantown, Maryland (disambiguation)
- Germantown, New York (disambiguation)
- Germantown, Pennsylvania (disambiguation)
- Germantown High School (disambiguation)
- Germantown station (disambiguation)
- Germantown Township (disambiguation)
