= Adams Township, Indiana =

Adams Township, Indiana is the name of the following places in the U.S.:

- Adams Township, Allen County, Indiana
- Adams Township, Carroll County, Indiana
- Adams Township, Cass County, Indiana
- Adams Township, Decatur County, Indiana
- Adams Township, Hamilton County, Indiana
- Adams Township, Madison County, Indiana
- Adams Township, Morgan County, Indiana
- Adams Township, Parke County, Indiana
- Adams Township, Ripley County, Indiana
- Adams Township, Warren County, Indiana

== See also ==
- Adams, Indiana
- Adams County, Indiana
