= Little Germany =

Little Germany may refer to:

- Little Germany, New York (Kleindeutschland), a former neighborhood; a steamboat disaster sped up its decline
- Little Germany, Bradford, a commercial and historic area, formerly influenced by local German merchants
- Little Germany, Ontario (disambiguation)
  - Little Germany, Grey County, Ontario: in the Blue Mountains
  - Little Germany, Northumberland County, Ontario: in the Township of Alnwick/Haldimand
- A former neighborhood in Lake City, Seattle, Washington
- "Little Germany", a political group in Cambridge that met at the White Horse Tavern during the English Reformation

== See also ==
- Germantown (disambiguation)
