= Clay Township, Decatur County, Indiana =

Clay Township
- Township
- Location of Clay Township in Decatur County
- Coordinates: 39°18′46″N 85°37′09″W
- Country: United States
- State: Indiana
- County: Decatur

Government
  - Type: Indiana township

Area
  - Total: 50.72 sq mi (131.4 km^{2})
  - Land: 50.65 sq mi (131.2 km^{2})
  - Water: 0.06 sq mi (0.16 km^{2})
- Elevation: 830 ft (253 m)

Population (2020)
  - Total: 1,284
  - Density: 25.35/sq mi (9.788/km^{2})
- FIPS code: 18-13042
- GNIS feature ID: 453208

Clay Township is one of nine townships in Decatur County, Indiana. As of the 2020 census, its population was 1,284 (slightly down from 1,287 at 2010) and it contained 523 housing units.

Historical population
Census	Pop.	Note	%±
1890	1,681		—
1900	1,503		−10.6%
1910	1,508		0.3%
1920	1,425		−5.5%
1930	1,395		−2.1%
1940	1,302		−6.7%
1950	1,335		2.5%
1960	1,457		9.1%
1970	1,504		3.2%
1980	1,507		0.2%
1990	1,413		−6.2%
2000	1,266		−10.4%
2010	1,287		1.7%
2020	1,284		−0.2%
Source: US Decennial Census

== History ==
Clay Township was organized in 1836.

Champ's Ford Bridge was added to the National Register of Historic Places in 2009.

== Geography ==
According to the 2010 census, the township has a total area of 50.72 square miles (131.4 km^{2}), of which 50.65 square miles (131.2 km^{2}) (or 99.86%) is land and 0.06 square miles (0.16 km^{2}) (or 0.12%) is water.

=== Unincorporated towns ===
- Burney
- Horace
- Milford

(This list is based on USGS data and may include former settlements.)

=== Adjacent townships ===
- Adams Township (northeast)
- Washington Township (east)
- Sand Creek Township (southeast)
- Jackson Township (south)
- Clifty Township, Bartholomew County (southwest)
- Haw Creek Township, Bartholomew County (west)
- Noble Township, Shelby County (northwest)

=== Major highways ===
- Indiana State Road 3
- Indiana State Road 46

=== Cemeteries ===
The township contains seven cemeteries: Center Grove, Columbia, Mowery, Nauvoo, Patrick, Pumphrey and Swinney.
