= Germantown, Maryland (disambiguation) =

Germantown, Maryland is a community in Montgomery County, and the only "Germantown, Maryland" recognized by the U.S. Postal Service.

Germantown, Maryland may also refer to:

- Germantown, Anne Arundel County, Maryland, unincorporated locale
- Germantown, Baltimore County, Maryland, unincorporated locale
- Germantown, Worcester County, Maryland, unincorporated locale

== See also ==
- Germantown (disambiguation)
