= Decatur County, Indiana =

County in Indiana, United States

- County
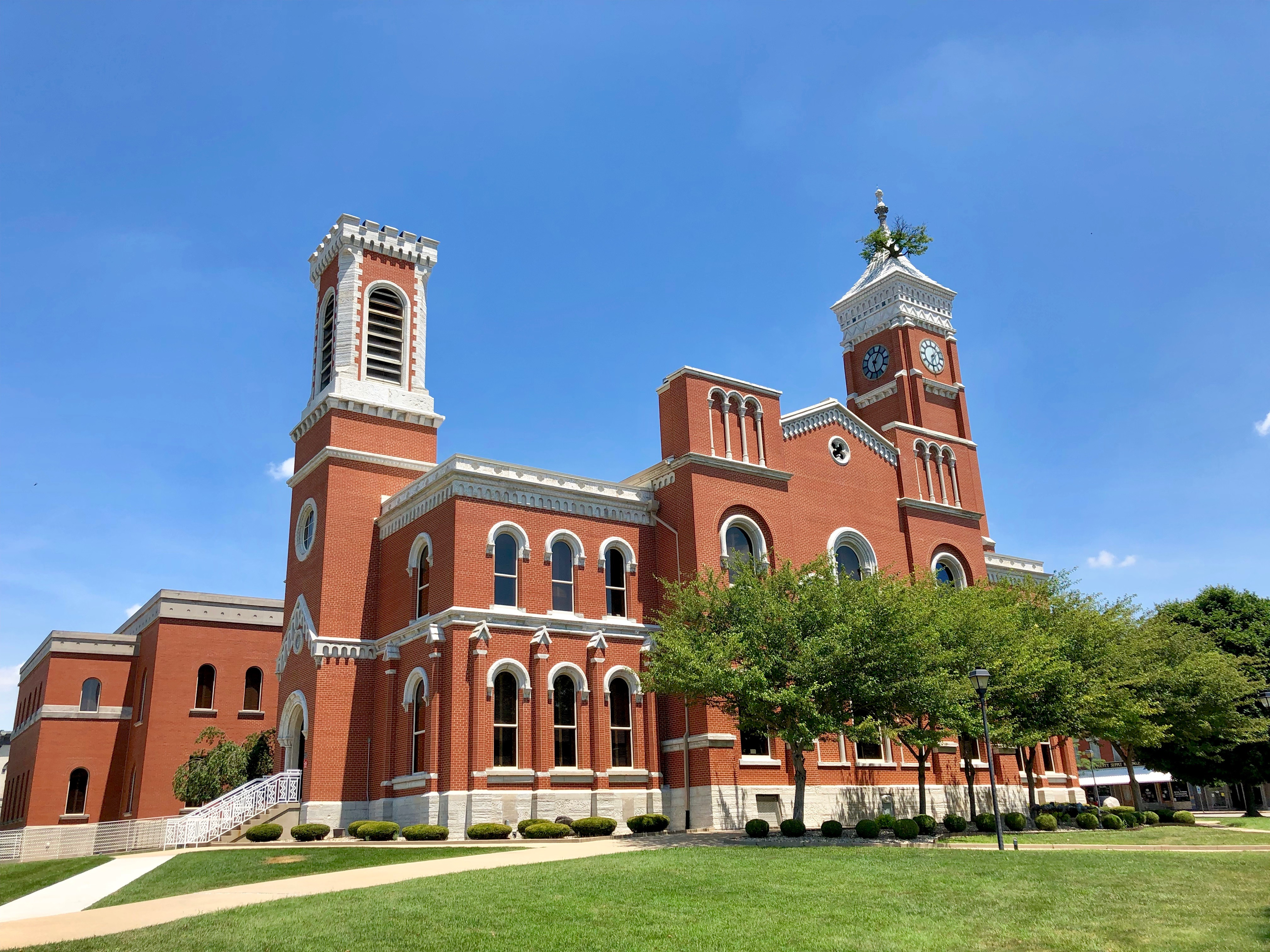
- Decatur County Courthouse in Greensburg

- Flag Logo

- Location within the U.S. state of Indiana
- Coordinates: 39°18′N 85°30′W
- Country: United States
- State: Indiana
- Founded: December 12, 1821 (authorized); 1822 (organized)
- Named for: Stephen Decatur, Jr.
- Seat: Greensburg
- Largest city: Greensburg

Area
  - Total: 373.32 sq mi (966.9 km^{2})
  - Land: 372.57 sq mi (965.0 km^{2})
  - Water: 0.76 sq mi (2.0 km^{2}) 0.20%

Population (2020)
  - Total: 26,472
  - Estimate (2025): 26,576 ▲
  - Density: 71.052/sq mi (27.433/km^{2})
- Congressional district: 9th
- Website: www.decaturcounty.in.gov
- Indiana county number 16

Decatur County is a county in the U.S. state of Indiana. As of the 2020 United States census, the population was 26,472. The county seat (and only incorporated city) is Greensburg.

== History ==
In 1787, the US defined the Northwest Territory which included the area of present-day Indiana. In 1800, Congress separated Ohio from the Northwest Territory, designating the rest of the land as the Indiana Territory. President Thomas Jefferson chose William Henry Harrison as the governor of the territory, and Vincennes was established as the capital. After the Michigan Territory was separated and the Illinois Territory was formed, Indiana was reduced to its current size and geography. By December 1816 the Indiana Territory was admitted to the Union as a state.

Starting in 1794, Native American titles to Indiana lands were extinguished by usurpation, purchase, or war and treaty. The United States acquired land from the Native Americans in the 1809 treaty of Fort Wayne, and by the treaty of St. Mary's in 1818 considerably more territory became property of the government. This included the future Decatur County, which was authorized by the state legislature on December 12, 1821. No settler was allowed in the area until the government survey was completed in 1820.

The Decatur County governing structure was formed in 1822. The county was named for Commodore Stephen Decatur Jr., naval officer in the First and Second Barbary Wars, and in the War of 1812. Decatur was killed in a duel in 1820.

== Geography ==
The low rolling hills are devoted to agriculture or urban development, with only the areas carved by drainages still wooded. The highest point (1,097 feet/334 meters ASL) is a hillock 0.8 miles (1.3 km) SSE from Kingston. The Flatrock River flows westward through the upper part of the county, continuing into Shelby County. Clifty Creek flows southwestward through the central part of the county, continuing into Bartholomew, and Sand Creek flows south-southwestward through the lower center of the county, continuing into Jennings County.

According to the 2010 census, the county has a total area of 373.32 square miles (966.9 km^{2}), of which 372.57 square miles (965.0 km^{2}) (or 99.80%) is land and 0.76 square miles (2.0 km^{2}) (or 0.20%) is water.

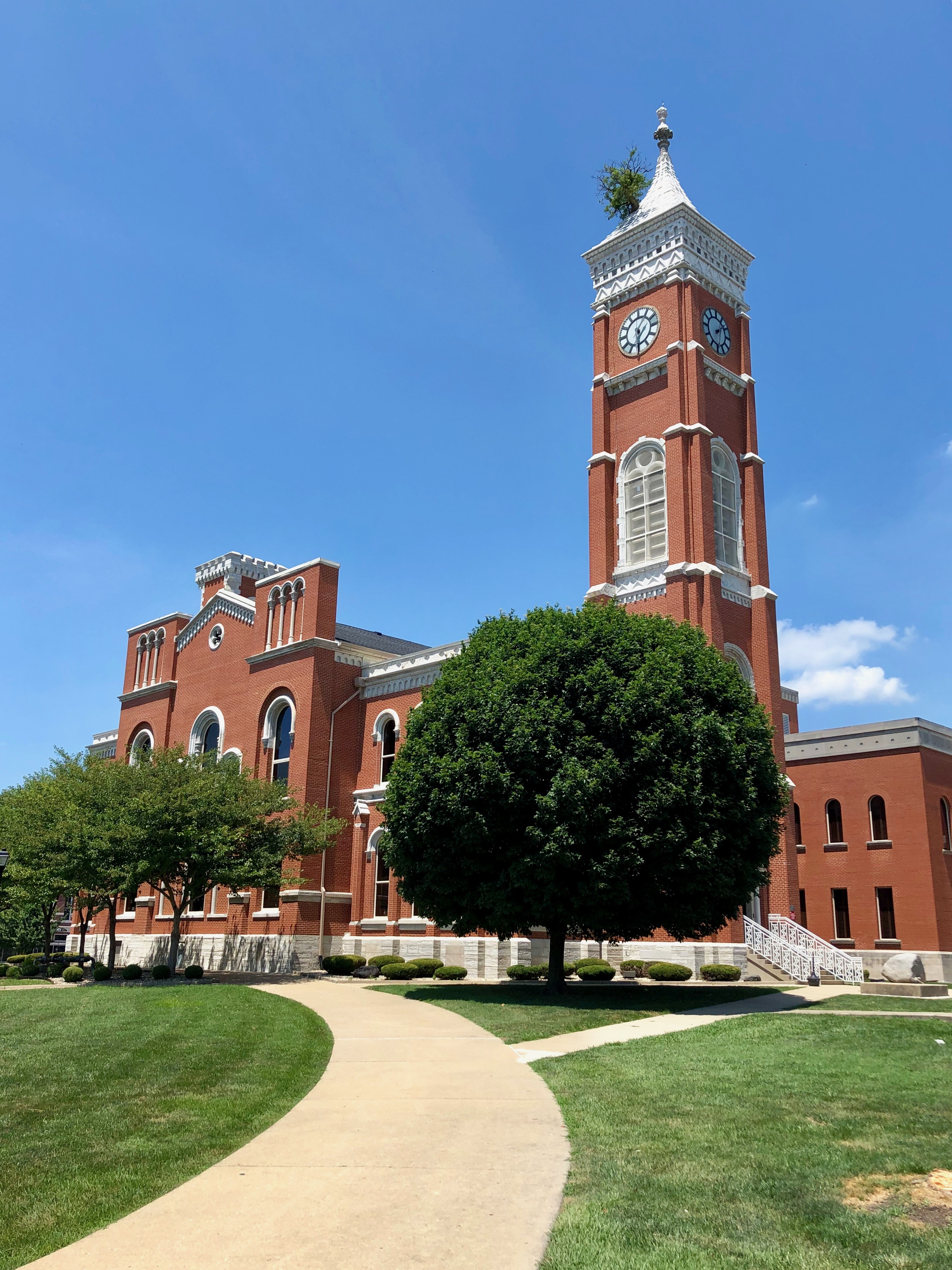
Tree on the Courthouse Tower in Greensburg, Indiana

=== Adjacent counties ===
- Rush County – north
- Franklin County – east
- Ripley County – southeast
- Jennings County – south
- Bartholomew County – west
- Shelby County – northwest

=== City and towns ===
- Greensburg (city/county seat)
- Millhousen
- New Point
- St. Paul (part)
- Westport

=== Census-designated places ===
- Clarksburg
- Lake Santee

=== Unincorporated places ===
- Adams
- Alert
- Burney
- Downeyville
- Forest Hill
- Gaynorsville
- Germantown
- Harris City
- Horace
- Kingston
- Knarr Corner
- Letts
- Letts Corner
- Mechanicsburg
- Milford
- New Pennington
- Rossburg
- Saint Maurice
- Saint Omer
- Sandusky
- Sardinia
- Slabtown
- Waynesburg
- Williamstown

=== Townships ===
- Adams
- Clay
- Clinton
- Fugit
- Jackson
- Marion
- Salt Creek
- Sand Creek
- Washington

=== Major highways ===
- Interstate 74
- U.S. Route 421
- Indiana State Road 3
- Indiana State Road 46

=== Protected areas ===
- Greenburg Reservoir State Fishing Area

=== Lakes ===
- Greenburg Reservoir
- Lake McCoy
- Lake Santee

== Climate and weather ==
Greensburg, Indiana

Climate chart (precipitation, max. and min. temperature)
| J | F | M | A | M | J | J | A | S | O | N | D |
| 2.6 34 19 | 2.4 40 22 | 3.7 50 32 | 4.3 62 42 | 5 72 53 | 4.3 81 62 | 4.1 85 65 | 4.2 83 63 | 3.1 77 56 | 3.1 65 44 | 3.8 51 35 | 3.2 40 25 |
- █ Average max. and min. temperatures in °F
- █ Precipitation totals in inches
- Source: The Weather Channel
Metric conversion
| J | F | M | A | M | J | J | A | S | O | N | D |
| 65 1 −7 | 61 4 −6 | 93 10 0 | 109 17 6 | 128 22 12 | 110 27 17 | 105 29 18 | 107 28 17 | 78 25 13 | 78 18 7 | 97 11 2 | 81 4 −4 |
- █ Average max. and min. temperatures in °C
- █ Precipitation totals in mm

In recent years, average temperatures in Greensburg have ranged from a low of 19 °F (−7 °C) in January to a high of 85 °F (29 °C) in July, although a record low of −24 °F (−31 °C) was recorded in January 1985 and a record high of 105 °F (41 °C) was recorded in July 1954. Average monthly precipitation ranged from 2.42 inches (61 mm) in February to 5.03 inches (128 mm) in May.

== Government ==
The county government is a constitutional body, and is granted specific powers by the Constitution of Indiana, and by the Indiana Code.

County Council: The legislative branch of the county government; controls spending and revenue collection in the county. Representatives are elected to four-year terms from county districts. They set salaries, the annual budget, and special spending. The council has limited authority to impose local taxes, in the form of an income and property tax that is subject to state level approval, excise taxes, and service taxes.

Board of Commissioners: The executive body of the county; commissioners are elected county-wide to staggered four-year terms. One commissioner serves as president. The commissioners execute acts legislated by the council, collect revenue, and manage the county government.

Court: The county maintains a small claims court that handles civil cases. The judge on the court is elected to a term of four years and must be a member of the Indiana Bar Association. The judge is assisted by a constable who is also elected to a four-year term. In some cases, court decisions can be appealed to the state level circuit court.

County Officials: The county has other elected offices, including sheriff, coroner, auditor, treasurer, recorder, surveyor, and circuit court clerk. These officers are elected to four-year terms. Members elected to county government positions are required to declare a party affiliation and to be residents of the county.

Decatur County is part of Indiana's 6th congressional district; Indiana Senate district 42; and Indiana House of Representatives district 67.

United States presidential election results for Decatur County, Indiana
| Year | Republican | | Democratic | | Third party(ies) | |
| Year | No. | % | No. | % | No. | % |
|---|---|---|---|---|---|---|
| 1888 | 2,663 | 51.86% | 2,400 | 46.74% | 72 | 1.40% |
| 1892 | 2,519 | 49.39% | 2,355 | 46.18% | 226 | 4.43% |
| 1896 | 2,848 | 52.56% | 2,520 | 46.50% | 51 | 0.94% |
| 1900 | 2,900 | 51.58% | 2,598 | 46.21% | 124 | 2.21% |
| 1904 | 3,178 | 55.48% | 2,341 | 40.87% | 209 | 3.65% |
| 1908 | 2,838 | 50.62% | 2,564 | 45.73% | 205 | 3.66% |
| 1912 | 1,263 | 24.43% | 2,246 | 43.44% | 1,661 | 32.13% |
| 1916 | 2,717 | 51.39% | 2,374 | 44.90% | 196 | 3.71% |
| 1920 | 5,516 | 57.66% | 3,896 | 40.73% | 154 | 1.61% |
| 1924 | 4,907 | 52.94% | 4,092 | 44.15% | 270 | 2.91% |
| 1928 | 5,400 | 58.40% | 3,791 | 41.00% | 55 | 0.59% |
| 1932 | 4,646 | 45.56% | 5,437 | 53.31% | 115 | 1.13% |
| 1936 | 5,126 | 50.72% | 4,887 | 48.35% | 94 | 0.93% |
| 1940 | 6,087 | 57.71% | 4,417 | 41.88% | 43 | 0.41% |
| 1944 | 5,479 | 60.86% | 3,471 | 38.55% | 53 | 0.59% |
| 1948 | 5,163 | 56.95% | 3,808 | 42.00% | 95 | 1.05% |
| 1952 | 6,490 | 65.15% | 3,393 | 34.06% | 78 | 0.78% |
| 1956 | 6,390 | 64.87% | 3,427 | 34.79% | 34 | 0.35% |
| 1960 | 6,240 | 60.17% | 4,080 | 39.34% | 50 | 0.48% |
| 1964 | 4,702 | 45.58% | 5,564 | 53.94% | 49 | 0.48% |
| 1968 | 5,474 | 55.67% | 3,602 | 36.63% | 757 | 7.70% |
| 1972 | 6,761 | 68.84% | 2,994 | 30.48% | 67 | 0.68% |
| 1976 | 5,555 | 55.63% | 4,365 | 43.72% | 65 | 0.65% |
| 1980 | 5,819 | 58.48% | 3,646 | 36.64% | 486 | 4.88% |
| 1984 | 6,551 | 69.97% | 2,766 | 29.54% | 46 | 0.49% |
| 1988 | 6,245 | 67.35% | 2,979 | 32.13% | 48 | 0.52% |
| 1992 | 5,195 | 50.48% | 2,774 | 26.96% | 2,322 | 22.56% |
| 1996 | 4,782 | 50.82% | 3,190 | 33.90% | 1,437 | 15.27% |
| 2000 | 6,115 | 66.68% | 2,889 | 31.50% | 167 | 1.82% |
| 2004 | 7,499 | 73.53% | 2,621 | 25.70% | 79 | 0.77% |
| 2008 | 6,449 | 61.40% | 3,892 | 37.06% | 162 | 1.54% |
| 2012 | 7,119 | 68.94% | 2,941 | 28.48% | 267 | 2.59% |
| 2016 | 8,490 | 75.95% | 2,121 | 18.97% | 567 | 5.07% |
| 2020 | 9,575 | 77.82% | 2,439 | 19.82% | 290 | 2.36% |
| 2024 | 9,491 | 78.21% | 2,406 | 19.83% | 238 | 1.96% |

== Demographics ==
Historical population
| Census | Pop. | Note | %± |
|---|---|---|---|
| 1830 | 5,887 | | — |
| 1840 | 12,171 | | 106.7% |
| 1850 | 15,107 | | 24.1% |
| 1860 | 17,294 | | 14.5% |
| 1870 | 19,053 | | 10.2% |
| 1880 | 19,779 | | 3.8% |
| 1890 | 19,277 | | −2.5% |
| 1900 | 19,518 | | 1.3% |
| 1910 | 18,793 | | −3.7% |
| 1920 | 17,813 | | −5.2% |
| 1930 | 17,308 | | −2.8% |
| 1940 | 17,722 | | 2.4% |
| 1950 | 18,218 | | 2.8% |
| 1960 | 20,019 | | 9.9% |
| 1970 | 22,738 | | 13.6% |
| 1980 | 23,841 | | 4.9% |
| 1990 | 23,645 | | −0.8% |
| 2000 | 24,555 | | 3.8% |
| 2010 | 25,740 | | 4.8% |
| 2020 | 26,472 | | 2.8% |
| 2025 (est.) | 26,576 | ▲ | 0.4% |
US Decennial Census; 1790–1960 1900–1990; 1990–2000 2010–2013

=== Racial and ethnic composition ===
Decatur County, Indiana – Racial and ethnic composition Note: the US Census treats Hispanic/Latino as an ethnic category. This table excludes Latinos from the racial categories and assigns them to a separate category. Hispanics/Latinos may be of any race.
| Race / Ethnicity (NH = Non-Hispanic) | Pop 1980 | Pop 1990 | Pop 2000 | Pop 2010 | Pop 2020 | % 1980 | % 1990 | % 2000 | % 2010 | % 2020 |
|---|---|---|---|---|---|---|---|---|---|---|
| White alone (NH) | 23,678 | 23,371 | 24,092 | 24,796 | 24,769 | 99.32% | 98.84% | 98.11% | 96.33% | 93.57% |
| Black or African American alone (NH) | 2 | 39 | 12 | 76 | 90 | 0.01% | 0.16% | 0.05% | 0.30% | 0.34% |
| Native American or Alaska Native alone (NH) | 9 | 18 | 24 | 36 | 35 | 0.04% | 0.08% | 0.10% | 0.14% | 0.13% |
| Asian alone (NH) | 72 | 124 | 177 | 178 | 154 | 0.30% | 0.52% | 0.72% | 0.69% | 0.58% |
| Native Hawaiian or Pacific Islander alone (NH) | x | x | 3 | 7 | 8 | x | x | 0.01% | 0.03% | 0.03% |
| Other race alone (NH) | 0 | 1 | 2 | 25 | 39 | 0.00% | 0.00% | 0.01% | 0.10% | 0.15% |
| Mixed race or Multiracial (NH) | x | x | 113 | 196 | 763 | x | x | 0.46% | 0.76% | 2.88% |
| Hispanic or Latino (any race) | 80 | 92 | 132 | 426 | 614 | 0.34% | 0.39% | 0.54% | 1.66% | 2.32% |
| Total | 23,841 | 23,645 | 24,555 | 25,740 | 26,472 | 100.00% | 100.00% | 100.00% | 100.00% | 100.00% |

=== 2020 census ===
As of the 2020 census, the county had a population of 26,472. The median age was 40.6 years. 23.3% of residents were under the age of 18 and 18.3% of residents were 65 years of age or older. For every 100 females there were 98.2 males, and for every 100 females age 18 and over there were 97.9 males age 18 and over.

The racial makeup of the county was 94.3% White, 0.3% Black or African American, 0.2% American Indian and Alaska Native, 0.6% Asian, <0.1% Native Hawaiian and Pacific Islander, 0.9% from some other race, and 3.7% from two or more races. Hispanic or Latino residents of any race comprised 2.3% of the population.

47.3% of residents lived in urban areas, while 52.7% lived in rural areas.

There were 10,472 households in the county, of which 30.2% had children under the age of 18 living in them. Of all households, 50.4% were married-couple households, 18.7% were households with a male householder and no spouse or partner present, and 22.9% were households with a female householder and no spouse or partner present. About 27.0% of all households were made up of individuals and 11.9% had someone living alone who was 65 years of age or older.

There were 11,512 housing units, of which 9.0% were vacant. Among occupied housing units, 71.3% were owner-occupied and 28.7% were renter-occupied. The homeowner vacancy rate was 1.6% and the rental vacancy rate was 6.6%.

=== 2010 Census ===
As of the 2010 United States census, there were 25,740 people, 9,977 households, and 6,995 families in the county. The population density was 69.1 inhabitants per square mile (26.7/km^{2}). There were 11,209 housing units at an average density of 30.1 per square mile (11.6/km^{2}). The racial makeup of the county was 97.3% white, 0.7% Asian, 0.3% black or African American, 0.2% American Indian, 0.6% from other races, and 0.9% from two or more races. Those of Hispanic or Latino origin made up 1.7% of the population. In terms of ancestry, In terms of ancestry, 35.5% were of English ancestry, 35.1% were of German, and 9.0% were of Irish ancestry according to 2010 American Community Survey.

Of the 9,977 households, 33.8% had children under the age of 18 living with them, 54.6% were married couples living together, 10.6% had a female householder with no husband present, 29.9% were non-families, and 25.0% of all households were made up of individuals. The average household size was 2.54 and the average family size was 3.02. The median age was 38.7 years.

The median income for a household in the county was $47,697 and the median income for a family was $52,308. Males had a median income of $41,143 versus $30,226 for females. The per capita income for the county was $22,719. About 8.3% of families and 10.8% of the population were below the poverty line, including 17.3% of those under age 18 and 6.8% of those age 65 or over.

== Education ==
The two school districts are Decatur County Community Schools and Greensburg Community Schools.

== See also ==
- National Register of Historic Places listings in Decatur County, Indiana
