= Clinton Township, Decatur County, Indiana =

Clinton Township
- Township
- Location of Clinton Township in Decatur County
- Coordinates: 39°25′19″N 85°28′03″W
- Country: United States
- State: Indiana
- County: Decatur

Government
  - Type: Indiana township

Area
  - Total: 22.47 sq mi (58.2 km^{2})
  - Land: 22.47 sq mi (58.2 km^{2})
  - Water: 0 sq mi (0 km^{2})
- Elevation: 948 ft (289 m)

Population (2020)
  - Total: 523
  - Density: 23.3/sq mi (8.99/km^{2})
- FIPS code: 18-13708
- GNIS feature ID: 453230

Clinton Township is one of nine townships in Decatur County, Indiana. As of the 2020 census, its population was 523 (up from 513 at 2010) and it contained 191 housing units.

Historical population
Census	Pop.	Note	%±
1890	699		—
1900	641		−8.3%
1910	641		0.0%
1920	599		−6.6%
1930	582		−2.8%
1940	572		−1.7%
1950	589		3.0%
1960	534		−9.3%
1970	583		9.2%
1980	497		−14.8%
1990	494		−0.6%
2000	473		−4.3%
2010	513		8.5%
2020	523		1.9%
Source: US Decennial Census

== History ==
Clinton Township was organized in 1829.

== Geography ==
According to the 2010 census, the township has a total area of 22.47 square miles (58.2 km^{2}), all land.

=== Unincorporated towns ===
- Sandusky
- Springhill (extinct)
- Williamstown

=== Adjacent townships ===
- Anderson Township, Rush County (north)
- Fugit Township (east)
- Washington Township (south)
- Adams Township (west)

=== Major highways ===
- Indiana State Road 3

=== Cemeteries ===
The township contains three cemeteries: Butcher, McLaughlin and Swails.
