= Jackson Township, Decatur County, Indiana =

Jackson Township
- Township
- Location of Jackson Township in Decatur County
- Coordinates: 39°11′54″N 85°38′29″W
- Country: United States
- State: Indiana
- County: Decatur

Government
  - Type: Indiana township

Area
  - Total: 40.29 sq mi (104.4 km^{2})
  - Land: 40.27 sq mi (104.3 km^{2})
  - Water: 0.02 sq mi (0.052 km^{2})
- Elevation: 801 ft (244 m)

Population (2020)
  - Total: 938
  - Density: 23.3/sq mi (8.99/km^{2})
- FIPS code: 18-36918
- GNIS feature ID: 453439

Jackson Township is one of nine townships in Decatur County, Indiana. As of the 2020 census, its population was 938 (down from 988 at 2010) and it contained 403 housing units.

Historical population
Census	Pop.	Note	%±
1890	1,562		—
1900	1,477		−5.4%
1910	1,369		−7.3%
1920	1,286		−6.1%
1930	1,093		−15.0%
1940	1,094		0.1%
1950	1,081		−1.2%
1960	1,173		8.5%
1970	1,153		−1.7%
1980	1,092		−5.3%
1990	1,000		−8.4%
2000	1,040		4.0%
2010	988		−5.0%
2020	938		−5.1%
Source: US Decennial Census

== History ==
Jackson Township was organized in 1834.

== Geography ==
According to the 2010 census, the township has a total area of 40.29 square miles (104.4 km^{2}), of which 40.27 square miles (104.3 km^{2}) (or 99.95%) is land and 0.02 square miles (0.052 km^{2}) (or 0.05%) is water.

=== Unincorporated towns ===
- Alert
- Forest Hill
- Sardinia
- Waynesburg

(This list is based on USGS data and may include former settlements.)

=== Adjacent townships ===
- Clay Township (north)
- Sand Creek Township (east)
- Sand Creek Township, Jennings County (south)
- Geneva Township, Jennings County (southwest)
- Clifty Township, Bartholomew County (west)
- Rock Creek Township, Bartholomew County (west)
- Haw Creek Township, Bartholomew County (northwest)

=== Major highways ===
- Indiana State Road 3

=== Cemeteries ===
The township contains six cemeteries: Lower Union, Mount Olivet, Mount Pisgah, Shirk, Wesley and Wynn.
