= Milford, Indiana =

Milford could refer to:

- Milford, Decatur County, Indiana
- Milford, Kosciusko County, Indiana
- Milford Township, LaGrange County, Indiana
- Former name of Green Hill, Indiana
