= Germantown, Indiana =

Germantown is the name of several places in the state of Indiana in the United States:

- Germantown, Decatur County, Indiana
- Germantown, a former settlement near Indianapolis, now inundated by Geist Reservoir

== See also ==
- East Germantown, Indiana
- Germantown (disambiguation)
