= Rush County Bridge No. 188 =

- U.S. National Register of Historic Places
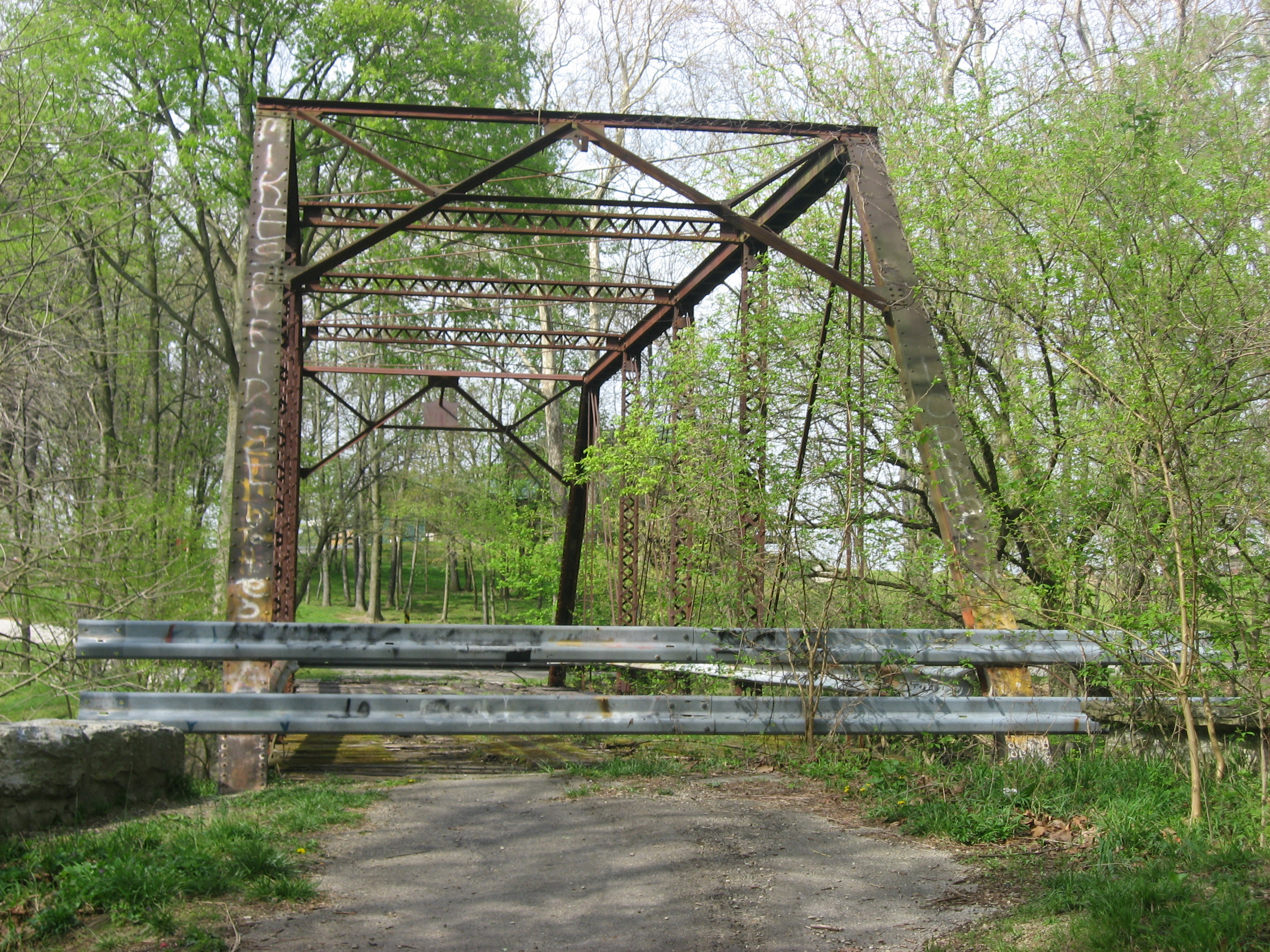
- Rush County Bridge No. 188, April 2012

- Location within Indiana Location within the United States
- Location: Cty. Rd. 150 W over Little Flatrock River at Milroy, Indiana
- Coordinates: 39°30′10″N 85°28′1″W
- Area: less than one acre
- Built: 1901
- Built by: New Castle Bridge Company
- Architectural style: Pratt through Truss
- NRHP reference No.: 00001542
- Added to NRHP: December 28, 2000

Rush County Bridge No. 188 is a historic Pratt through Truss bridge located in Anderson Township, Rush County, Indiana. It was built in 1901 by the New Castle Bridge Company and spans the Little Flatrock River. It measures 93 feet (28 m) long and rests on cut stone abutments with wing walls.

It was listed on the National Register of Historic Places in 2000.
