= Horace, Indiana =

Horace
- Unincorporated community
- Location within Indiana Location within the United States
- Coordinates: 39°15′45″N 85°33′51″W
- Country: United States
- State: Indiana
- County: Decatur
- Township: Clay
- Elevation: 873 ft (266 m)
- ZIP code: 47240
- FIPS code: 18-34780
- GNIS feature ID: 436474

Horace is an unincorporated community in Clay Township, Decatur County, Indiana.

== History ==
Horace was originally called Wyncoop, and under the latter name was platted in 1881 by James Wyncoop.

A post office was established at Horace in 1881, and remained in operation until it was discontinued in 1929.
