= Williamstown, Indiana =

- Unincorporated community
- Location within Indiana Location within the United States
- Coordinates: 39°27′10″N 85°28′09″W
- Country: United States
- State: Indiana
- County: Decatur, Rush
- Township: Clinton, Anderson
- Elevation: 958 ft (292 m)
- Time zone: UTC-5 (Eastern (EST))
  - Summer (DST): UTC-4 (EDT)
- ZIP code: 47240
- FIPS code: 18-84446
- GNIS feature ID: 446089

Williamstown is an unincorporated community in Decatur and Rush counties, in the U.S. state of Indiana.

== History ==
Williamstown was founded in 1830. An old variant name of the community was called Earl City.

A post office was established at Williamstown in 1834, and remained in operation until it was discontinued in 1905.

== Geography ==
Williamstown is located at the boundary between Decatur and Rush counties.
