= New Pennington, Indiana =

New Pennington
- Unincorporated community
- Location within Indiana Location within the United States
- Coordinates: 39°16′47″N 85°19′29″W
- Country: United States
- State: Indiana
- County: Decatur
- Township: Salt Creek
- Elevation: 971 ft (296 m)
- ZIP code: 47240
- FIPS code: 18-53400
- GNIS feature ID: 440095

New Pennington is an unincorporated community in Salt Creek Township, Decatur County, Indiana.

== History ==
New Pennington was laid out in 1851. It was named for its founder, Eli Pennington.

A post office was established at New Pennington in 1852, and remained in operation until it was discontinued in 1886.
