= Germantown station =

Germantown station may refer to:

- Germantown station (MARC), a MARC Train station in Germantown, Maryland
- Germantown station (SEPTA), a SEPTA station in Philadelphia, Pennsylvania

== See also ==
- Germantown (disambiguation)
