= Haw Creek Township, Bartholomew County, Indiana =

Hawcreek Township
- Township
- Location in Bartholomew County
- Coordinates: 39°18′29″N 85°44′52″W
- Country: United States
- State: Indiana
- County: Bartholomew

Government
  - Type: Indiana township

Area
  - Total: 37.23 sq mi (96.4 km^{2})
  - Land: 37.09 sq mi (96.1 km^{2})
  - Water: 0.15 sq mi (0.39 km^{2}) 0.40%
- Elevation: 725 ft (221 m)

Population (2020)
  - Total: 3,801
  - Density: 105.3/sq mi (40.7/km^{2})
- ZIP codes: 47203, 47234, 47244, 47246
- GNIS feature ID: 0453403

Hawcreek Township is one of twelve townships in Bartholomew County, Indiana, United States. As of the 2010 census, its population was 3,905 and it contained 1,537 housing units.

== Geography ==
According to the 2010 census, the township has a total area of 37.23 square miles (96.4 km^{2}), of which 37.09 square miles (96.1 km^{2}) (or 99.62%) is land and 0.15 square miles (0.39 km^{2}) (or 0.40%) is water.

=== Cities, towns, villages ===
- Hartsville
- Hope

=== Unincorporated towns ===
- Old Saint Louis
- Rugby

(This list is based on USGS data and may include former settlements.)

=== Adjacent townships ===
- Noble Township, Shelby County (northeast)
- Clay Township, Decatur County (east)
- Jackson Township, Decatur County (southeast)
- Clifty Township (south)
- Clay Township (southwest)
- Flat Rock Township (west)
- Washington Township, Shelby County (northwest)

=== Cemeteries ===
The township contains these seven cemeteries: Fletcher, Galbraith, Hartsville College, Moravian, Old Saint Louis, Sidener and Simmons.

=== Major highways ===
- Indiana State Road 9
- Indiana State Road 46

=== Lakes ===
- Schaefer Lake

== School districts ==
- Flat Rock-Hawcreek School Corporation

== Political districts ==
- Indiana's 6th congressional district
- State House District 57
- State Senate District 41
