= Westport, Indiana =

- Town
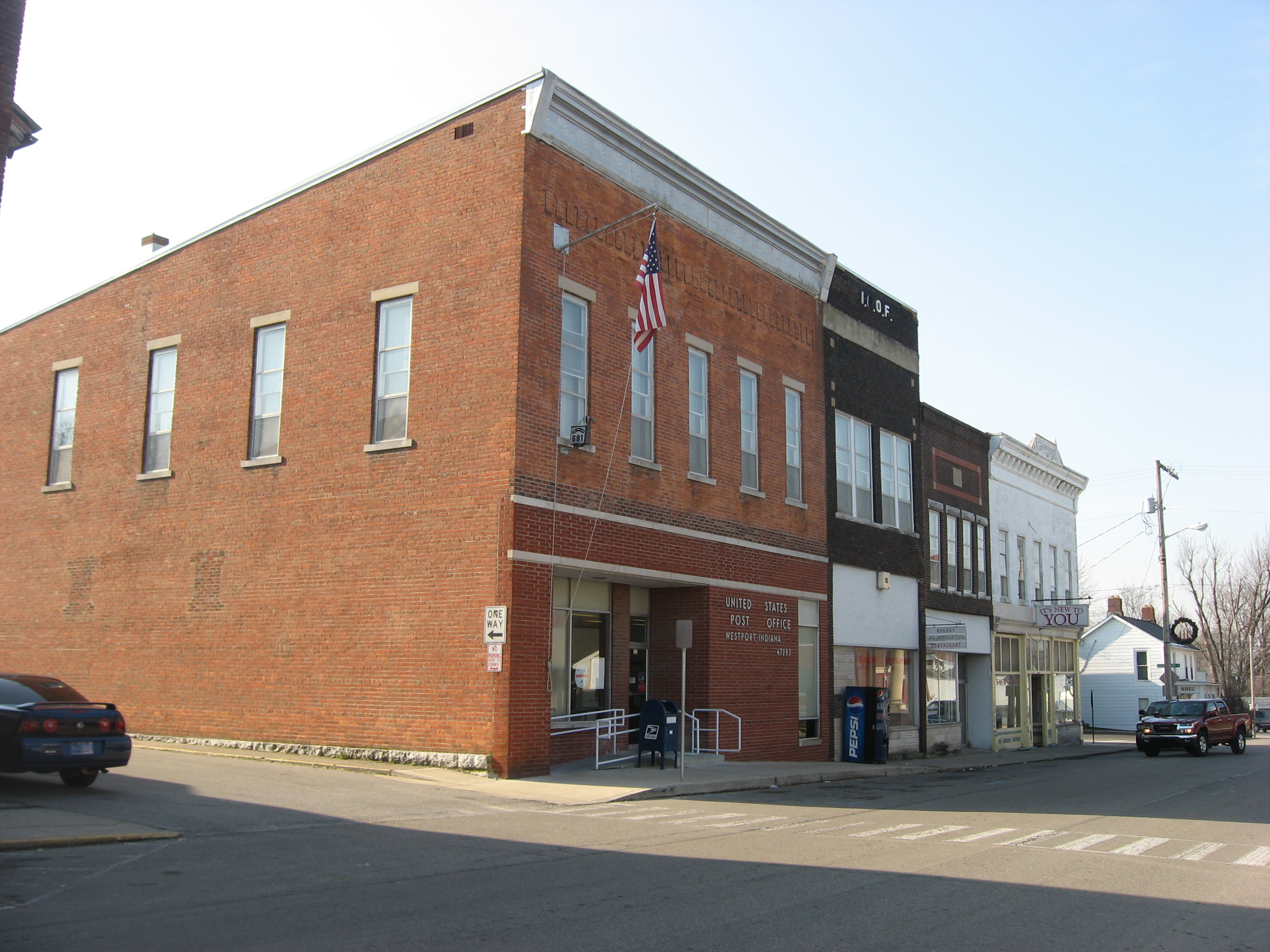
- Main Street

- Location of Westport in Decatur County, Indiana.
- Coordinates: 39°10′36″N 85°34′29″W
- Country: United States
- State: Indiana
- County: Decatur
- Township: Sand Creek

Area
  - Total: 1.16 sq mi (3.01 km^{2})
  - Land: 1.15 sq mi (2.98 km^{2})
  - Water: 0.012 sq mi (0.03 km^{2})
- Elevation: 801 ft (244 m)

Population (2020)
  - Total: 1,393
  - Density: 1,210.9/sq mi (467.55/km^{2})
- Time zone: UTC-5 (EST)
  - Summer (DST): UTC-5 (EST)
- ZIP code: 47283
- Area code: 812
- FIPS code: 18-83276
- GNIS feature ID: 2397736
- Website: www.in.gov/towns/westport/

Westport is a town located in Sand Creek Township, Decatur County, Indiana, United States. As of the 2020 census, Westport had a population of 1,393. A covered bridge, built in 1880, is located about 1.5 miles east of town.

== History ==
Westport was laid out in March 1836. Simeon Sharp and Hockersmith Merryman were the founders of Westport when 20 lots were laid out based around a center point at the intersection of Main and Poplar Streets. The Westport post office was established in 1839, but first spelled West Port.

== Geography ==
According to the 2010 census, Westport has a total area of 1.333 square miles (3.45 km^{2}), of which 1.32 square miles (3.42 km^{2}) (or 99.02%) is land and 0.013 square miles (0.03 km^{2}) (or 0.98%) is water.

== Demographics ==
Historical population
Census	Pop.	Note	%±
1880	212		—
1890	452		113.2%
1900	614		35.8%
1910	675		9.9%
1920	709		5.0%
1930	637		−10.2%
1940	644		1.1%
1950	658		2.2%
1960	833		26.6%
1970	1,170		40.5%
1980	1,450		23.9%
1990	1,478		1.9%
2000	1,515		2.5%
2010	1,379		−9.0%
2020	1,393		1.0%
U.S. Decennial Census

=== 2010 census ===
As of the census of 2010, there were 1,379 people, 548 households, and 369 families living in the town. The population density was 1,044.7 inhabitants per square mile (403.4/km^{2}). There were 653 housing units at an average density of 494.7 per square mile (191.0/km^{2}). The racial makeup of the town was 98.5% White, 0.1% African American, 0.2% Native American, 0.1% Asian, and 1.1% from two or more races. Hispanic or Latino of any race were 0.9% of the population.

There were 548 households, of which 34.7% had children under the age of 18 living with them, 48.0% were married couples living together, 14.8% had a female householder with no husband present, 4.6% had a male householder with no wife present, and 32.7% were non-families. 27.7% of all households were made up of individuals, and 11.1% had someone living alone who was 65 years of age or older. The average household size was 2.52 and the average family size was 3.08.

The median age in the town was 36.4 years. 27.6% of residents were under the age of 18; 8.3% were between the ages of 18 and 24; 26.1% were from 25 to 44; 23.8% were from 45 to 64; and 14.1% were 65 years of age or older. The gender makeup of the town was 48.5% male and 51.5% female.

=== 2000 census ===
As of the census of 2000, there were 1,515 people, 606 households, and 426 families living in the town. The population density was 1,142.7 inhabitants per square mile (441.2/km^{2}). There were 659 housing units at an average density of 497.0 per square mile (191.9/km^{2}). The racial makeup of the town was 99.21% White, 0.07% Native American, 0.07% Asian, 0.20% from other races, and 0.46% from two or more races. Hispanic or Latino of any race were 0.20% of the population.

There were 606 households, out of which 35.1% had children under the age of 18 living with them, 54.8% were married couples living together, 9.6% had a female householder with no husband present, and 29.7% were non-families. 26.2% of all households were made up of individuals, and 10.6% had someone living alone who was 65 years of age or older. The average household size was 2.50 and the average family size was 3.00.

In the town, the population was spread out, with 27.6% under the age of 18, 7.9% from 18 to 24, 30.6% from 25 to 44, 21.5% from 45 to 64, and 12.4% who were 65 years of age or older. The median age was 33 years. For every 100 females, there were 94.0 males. For every 100 females age 18 and over, there were 92.5 males.

The median income for a household in the town was $37,500, and the median income for a family was $47,826. Males had a median income of $31,890 versus $27,621 for females. The per capita income for the town was $18,298. About 6.5% of families and 10.5% of the population were below the poverty line, including 16.7% of those under age 18 and 3.0% of those age 65 or over.

== Education ==
It is in Decatur County Community Schools.
