= Washington Township, Decatur County, Indiana =

Washington Township
- Township
- Location of Washington Township in Decatur County
- Coordinates: 39°20′13″N 85°28′22″W
- Country: United States
- State: Indiana
- County: Decatur

Government
  - Type: Indiana township
  - Township Trustee: Beverly Rivera

Area
  - Total: 55.24 sq mi (143.1 km^{2})
  - Land: 55.07 sq mi (142.6 km^{2})
  - Water: 0.17 sq mi (0.44 km^{2})
- Elevation: 955 ft (291 m)

Population (2020)
  - Total: 14,053
  - Density: 255.2/sq mi (98.53/km^{2})
- Time zone: EST
- Postal code: 47240
- Area code: 812
- FIPS code: 18-80558
- GNIS feature ID: 453992
- Website: washingtontownship16.in.gov

Washington Township is one of nine townships in Decatur County, Indiana. As of the 2020 census, its population was 14,053 (up from 13,304 at 2010) and it contained 6,177 housing units.

Historical population
Census	Pop.	Note	%±
1890	5,518		—
1900	6,604		19.7%
1910	6,828		3.4%
1920	6,791		−0.5%
1930	7,182		5.8%
1940	7,495		4.4%
1950	8,256		10.2%
1960	9,379		13.6%
1970	11,112		18.5%
1980	11,346		2.1%
1990	11,330		−0.1%
2000	12,206		7.7%
2010	13,304		9.0%
2020	14,053		5.6%
Source: US Decennial Census

== History ==
Washington Township was organized in 1822.

Strauther Pleak Round Barn was added to the National Register of Historic Places in 1993.

== Geography ==
According to the 2010 census, the township has a total area of 55.24 square miles (143.1 km^{2}), of which 55.07 square miles (142.6 km^{2}) (or 99.69%) is land and 0.17 square miles (0.44 km^{2}) (or 0.31%) is water.

=== Cities and towns ===
- Greensburg

=== Unincorporated towns ===
- Knarr Corner
- Middle Branch

(This list is based on USGS data and may include former settlements.)

=== Adjacent townships ===
- Clinton Township (north)
- Fugit Township (northeast)
- Salt Creek Township (east)
- Marion Township (south)
- Sand Creek Township (southwest)
- Clay Township (west)
- Adams Township (northwest)

=== Major highways ===
- Interstate 74
- U.S. Route 421
- Indiana State Road 3
- Indiana State Road 46

=== Cemeteries ===
The township contains five cemeteries: Forsythe, Saint Marys, Sand Creek, South Park and Springer.
