= Adams, Indiana =

Unincorporated community in Indiana, United States

Adams
- Unincorporated community and Census-designated place
- Location within Indiana Location within the United States
- Coordinates: 39°22′57″N 85°33′41″W
- Country: United States
- State: Indiana
- County: Decatur
- Township: Adams
- Elevation: 886 ft (270 m)

Population (2000)
  - Total: 175
- ZIP code: 47240
- FIPS code: 18-00352
- GNIS feature ID: 2830349

Adams is an unincorporated community in Adams Township, Decatur County, Indiana.

== History ==
Adams was laid out in 1855, soon after the railroad was extended to that point. It was named after the township it is in.

In 1890, the population was estimated at 400 residents. In 1900, the population was 414.

By 1920, the population was 404. The population was 275 in 1940.

== Demographics ==
The United States Census Bureau delineated Adams as a census designated place in the 2022 American Community Survey.

== See also ==
- Kingston, Indiana
