= Saint Maurice, Indiana =

Saint Maurice
- Unincorporated community
- Location within Indiana Location within the United States
- Coordinates: 39°21′58″N 85°20′04″W
- Country: United States
- State: Indiana
- County: Decatur
- Township: Fugit
- Elevation: 1,040 ft (320 m)
- ZIP code: 47240
- FIPS code: 18-67158
- GNIS feature ID: 442726

Saint Maurice is an unincorporated community in Fugit Township, Decatur County, Indiana, United States.

== History ==
Saint Maurice was laid out in 1859. It was originally settled chiefly by Catholics, and named for Saint Maurice.

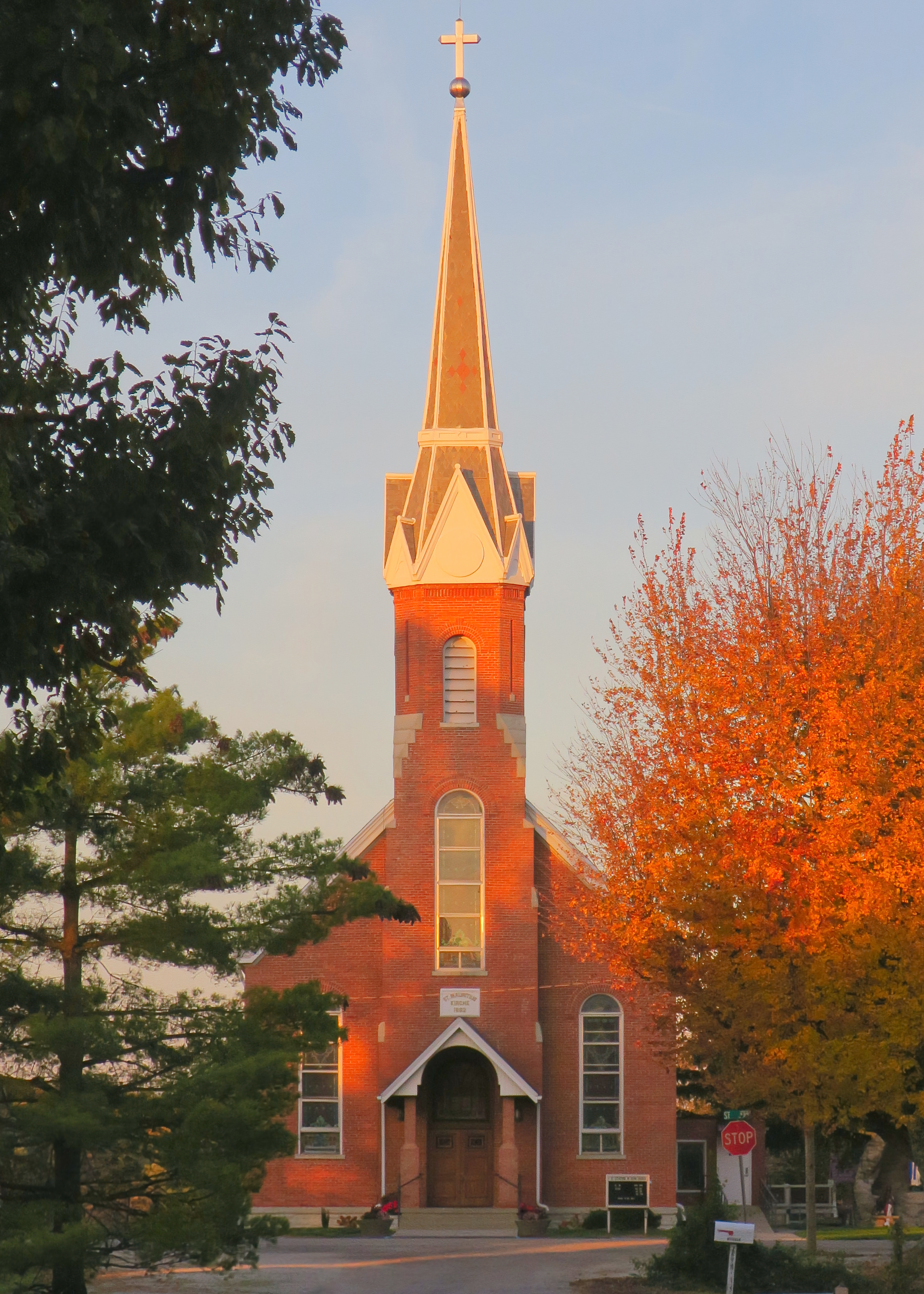
Saint Maurice Church (Saint Maurice, Indiana) in 2025
