= Rugby, Indiana =

- Unincorporated community
- Bartholomew County's location in Indiana

- Location in Bartholomew County
- Coordinates: 39°18′33″N 85°42′53″W
- Country: United States
- State: Indiana
- County: Bartholomew
- Township: Haw Creek
- Elevation: 771 ft (235 m)
- Time zone: UTC-5 (Eastern (EST))
  - Summer (DST): UTC-4 (EDT)
- ZIP code: 47246
- FIPS code: 18-66330
- GNIS feature ID: 442384

Rugby is an unincorporated community in Haw Creek Township, Bartholomew County, in the U.S. state of Indiana.

== History ==
A post office was established at Rugby in 1884, and remained in operation until it was discontinued in 1935.

== Geography ==
Rugby is located on Bartholomew County Road 1050 East roughly halfway between 700 North and 750 North, and is ENE of Hope, Indiana and NNW of Hartsville, Indiana.
