= Salt Creek Township, Decatur County, Indiana =

Salt Creek Township
- Township
- Location of Salt Creek Township in Decatur County
- Coordinates: 39°18′34″N 85°20′31″W
- Country: United States
- State: Indiana
- County: Decatur

Government
  - Type: Indiana township

Area
  - Total: 29.86 sq mi (77.3 km^{2})
  - Land: 29.86 sq mi (77.3 km^{2})
  - Water: 0 sq mi (0 km^{2})
- Elevation: 991 ft (302 m)

Population (2020)
  - Total: 1,160
  - Density: 38.8/sq mi (15.0/km^{2})
- FIPS code: 18-67536
- GNIS feature ID: 453826

Salt Creek Township is one of nine townships in Decatur County, Indiana. As of the 2020 census, its population was 1,160 (down from 1,179 at 2010) and it contained 475 housing units.

Historical population
Census	Pop.	Note	%±
1890	1,733		—
1900	1,532		−11.6%
1910	1,228		−19.8%
1920	1,237		0.7%
1930	1,114		−9.9%
1940	1,109		−0.4%
1950	1,023		−7.8%
1960	1,009		−1.4%
1970	1,192		18.1%
1980	1,119		−6.1%
1990	1,187		6.1%
2000	1,174		−1.1%
2010	1,179		0.4%
2020	1,160		−1.6%
Source: US Decennial Census

== History ==
Salt Creek Township was organized in 1836.

== Geography ==
According to the 2010 census, the township has a total area of 29.86 square miles (77.3 km^{2}), all land.

=== Cities and towns ===
- New Point

=== Unincorporated towns ===
- Enochsburg
- Mechanicsburg
- New Pennington
- Rossburg
- Smiths Crossing

(This list is based on USGS data and may include former settlements.)

=== Adjacent townships ===
- Fugit Township (north)
- Ray Township, Franklin County (east)
- Laughery Township, Ripley County (southeast)
- Jackson Township, Ripley County (south)
- Marion Township (southwest)
- Washington Township (west)

=== Major highways ===
- Interstate 74
- Indiana State Road 46

=== Cemeteries ===
The township contains two cemeteries: Maple and Ross.
