= Millhousen, Indiana =

- Town
- Seal

- Location of Millhousen in Decatur County, Indiana.
- Coordinates: 39°12′43″N 85°26′03″W
- Country: United States
- State: Indiana
- County: Decatur
- Township: Marion
- Established: 1834

Area
  - Total: 1.01 sq mi (2.62 km^{2})
  - Land: 1.01 sq mi (2.62 km^{2})
  - Water: 0 sq mi (0.00 km^{2})
- Elevation: 902 ft (275 m)

Population (2020)
  - Total: 149
  - Density: 147.6/sq mi (56.97/km^{2})
- Time zone: UTC-5 (Eastern (EST))
  - Summer (DST): UTC-4 (EDT)
- ZIP code: 47261
- Area code: 812
- FIPS code: 18-49662
- GNIS feature ID: 2396765
- Website: millhousen.com

Millhousen is a town in Marion Township, Decatur County, Indiana, United States. The population was 149 at the 2020 census.

== History ==
Millhousen was platted in 1858, having been settled by a colony of German Catholics. It was named for a town of the same name in Germany. Millhousen is perhaps best known for being the home of the Immaculate Conception Church, one of only four Roman Catholic churches in Decatur County.

== Geography ==
According to the 2010 census, Millhousen has a total area of 1.01 square miles (2.62 km^{2}), all land.

== Demographics ==
Historical population
Census	Pop.	Note	%±
1880	331		—
1890	224		−32.3%
1900	265		18.3%
1910	211		−20.4%
1920	165		−21.8%
1930	162		−1.8%
1940	180		11.1%
1950	184		2.2%
1960	212		15.2%
1970	252		18.9%
1980	214		−15.1%
1990	151		−29.4%
2000	136		−9.9%
2010	127		−6.6%
2020	149		17.3%
U.S. Decennial Census

=== 2010 census ===
As of the census of 2010, there were 127 people, 52 households, and 31 families living in the town. The population density was 125.7 inhabitants per square mile (48.5/km^{2}). There were 60 housing units at an average density of 59.4 per square mile (22.9/km^{2}). The racial makeup of the town was 99.2% White and 0.8% from two or more races.

There were 52 households, of which 32.7% had children under the age of 18 living with them, 48.1% were married couples living together, 5.8% had a female householder with no husband present, 5.8% had a male householder with no wife present, and 40.4% were non-families. 36.5% of all households were made up of individuals, and 17.3% had someone living alone who was 65 years of age or older. The average household size was 2.44 and the average family size was 3.10.

The median age in the town was 32.9 years. 28.3% of residents were under the age of 18; 5.6% were between the ages of 18 and 24; 31.5% were from 25 to 44; 22.9% were from 45 to 64; and 11.8% were 65 years of age or older. The gender makeup of the town was 49.6% male and 50.4% female.

=== 2000 census ===
As of the census of 2000, there were 136 people, 55 households, and 38 families living in the town. The population density was 134.3 inhabitants per square mile (51.9/km^{2}). There were 63 housing units at an average density of 62.2 per square mile (24.0/km^{2}). The racial makeup of the town was 100.00% White.

There were 55 households, out of which 30.9% had children under the age of 18 living with them, 60.0% were married couples living together, 3.6% had a female householder with no husband present, and 29.1% were non-families. 25.5% of all households were made up of individuals, and 20.0% had someone living alone who was 65 years of age or older. The average household size was 2.47 and the average family size was 3.00.

In the town, the population was spread out, with 24.3% under the age of 18, 9.6% from 18 to 24, 26.5% from 25 to 44, 19.1% from 45 to 64, and 20.6% who were 65 years of age or older. The median age was 34 years. For every 100 females, there were 100.0 males. For every 100 females age 18 and over, there were 94.3 males.

The median income for a household in the town was $39,250, and the median income for a family was $41,250. Males had a median income of $33,333 versus $33,333 for females. The per capita income for the town was $17,646. There were 5.0% of families and 2.7% of the population living below the poverty line, including no under eighteens and 12.5% of those over 64.

== Education ==
It is in Decatur County Community Schools.
