= Newbern, Indiana =

- Unincorporated town
- Bartholomew County's location in Indiana

- Location in Bartholomew County
- Coordinates: 39°14′07″N 85°45′03″W
- Country: United States
- State: Indiana
- County: Bartholomew
- Township: Clifty
- Elevation: 682 ft (208 m)
- ZIP code: 47203
- FIPS code: 18-52506
- GNIS feature ID: 440135

Newbern is an unincorporated town in Clifty Township, Bartholomew County, in the U.S. state of Indiana.

== History ==
A post office was established at Newbern in 1833, and remained in operation until it was discontinued in 1901. Newbern was named after New Bern, North Carolina, the native home of an early settler.

== Demographics ==
The United States Census Bureau defined Newburn as a census designated place in the 2022 American Community Survey.
