= Gaynorsville, Indiana =

Gaynorsville
- Unincorporated community
- Location within Indiana Location within the United States
- Coordinates: 39°14′34″N 85°31′12″W
- Country: United States
- State: Indiana
- County: Decatur
- Township: Sand Creek
- Elevation: 876 ft (267 m)
- ZIP code: 47240
- FIPS code: 18-27160
- GNIS feature ID: 435000

Gaynorsville is an unincorporated community in Sand Creek Township, Decatur County, Indiana.

== History ==
A post office was established at Gaynorsville in 1871, and remained in operation until it was discontinued in 1904.
