= Alert, Indiana =

Alert
- Unincorporated community
- Location within Indiana Location within the United States
- Coordinates: 39°09′37″N 85°40′42″W
- Country: United States
- State: Indiana
- County: Decatur
- Township: Jackson
- Elevation: 764 ft (233 m)

Population (2000)
  - Total: 90
- ZIP code: 47283
- FIPS code: 18-00892
- GNIS feature ID: 430058

Alert is an unincorporated community in Jackson Township, Decatur County, Indiana.

== History ==
Alert was laid out in 1886.

An 1896 railroad map of Indiana shows Alert and a nearby point labeled "Sta." along a rail line.

A freighthouse at Alert was dated to 1898 in a National Register nomination for the Southern Indiana Railroad Freighthouse.
