= Letts, Indiana =

Letts
- Unincorporated community and Census-designated place
- Location within Indiana Location within the United States
- Coordinates: 39°14′02″N 85°34′07″W
- Country: United States
- State: Indiana
- County: Decatur
- Township: Sand Creek
- Elevation: 889 ft (271 m)
- ZIP code: 47240
- FIPS code: 18-42984
- GNIS feature ID: 2830351

Letts is an unincorporated community in Sand Creek Township, Decatur County, Indiana.

== History ==
Letts Corner was originally the name given to the railroad station of nearby Letts. Lett was the name of a family in the area. The town first had a post office in 1871 and was laid out in 1882.

The Letts post office was discontinued in 1954. Allen W. Lett was an early postmaster.

== Demographics ==
The United States Census Bureau delineated Letts as a census designated place in the 2022 American Community Survey.
