= Marion Township, Decatur County, Indiana =

Marion Township
- Township
- Location of Marion Township in Decatur County
- Coordinates: 39°14′30″N 85°27′09″W
- Country: United States
- State: Indiana
- County: Decatur

Government
  - Type: Indiana township

Area
  - Total: 55.54 sq mi (143.8 km^{2})
  - Land: 55.48 sq mi (143.7 km^{2})
  - Water: 0.06 sq mi (0.16 km^{2})
- Elevation: 906 ft (276 m)

Population (2020)
  - Total: 1,711
  - Density: 30.84/sq mi (11.91/km^{2})
- FIPS code: 18-46872
- GNIS feature ID: 453604

Marion Township is one of nine townships in Decatur County, Indiana, United States. As of the 2020 census, its population was 1,711 (up from 1,638 at 2010) and it contained 674 housing units.

Historical population
Census	Pop.	Note	%±
1890	2,038		—
1900	1,794		−12.0%
1910	1,670		−6.9%
1920	1,507		−9.8%
1930	1,331		−11.7%
1940	1,443		8.4%
1950	1,359		−5.8%
1960	1,409		3.7%
1970	1,612		14.4%
1980	1,651		2.4%
1990	1,653		0.1%
2000	1,637		−1.0%
2010	1,638		0.1%
2020	1,711		4.5%
Source: US Decennial Census

== History ==
Marion Township was organized in 1831.

== Geography ==
According to the 2010 census, the township has a total area of 55.54 square miles (143.8 km^{2}), of which 55.48 square miles (143.7 km^{2}) (or 99.89%) is land and 0.06 square miles (0.16 km^{2}) (or 0.11%) is water.

=== Cities and towns ===
- Millhousen

=== Unincorporated towns ===
- Slabtown

(This list is based on USGS data and may include former settlements.)

=== Adjacent townships ===
- Washington Township (north)
- Salt Creek Township (northeast)
- Jackson Township, Ripley County (southeast)
- Columbia Township, Jennings County (south)
- Sand Creek Township (west)

=== Major highways ===
- U.S. Route 421

=== Cemeteries ===
The township contains four cemeteries: Antioch, Burks Chapel, Mount Pleasant, and Immaculate Conception Catholic Cemetery.
