= Rossburg, Indiana =

Rossburg
- Unincorporated community
- Location within Indiana Location within the United States
- Coordinates: 39°19′33″N 85°19′34″W
- Country: United States
- State: Indiana
- County: Decatur
- Township: Salt Creek
- Elevation: 932 ft (284 m)
- ZIP code: 47240
- FIPS code: 18-66105
- GNIS feature ID: 442325

Rossburg is an unincorporated community in Salt Creek Township, Decatur County, Indiana, U.S.A.

== History ==
Rossburg was laid out in 1836. A post office was established at Rossburg in 1838, and remained in operation until it was discontinued in 1870.
