= Forest Hill, Indiana =

Forest Hill
- Unincorporated town
- Location within Indiana Location within the United States
- Coordinates: 39°15′25″N 85°36′48″W
- Country: United States
- State: Indiana
- County: Decatur
- Township: Jackson
- Elevation: 833 ft (254 m)
- ZIP code: 47240
- FIPS code: 18-23962
- GNIS feature ID: 434651

Forest Hill is an unincorporated town in Jackson Township, Decatur County, Indiana.

== History ==
Forest Hill was laid out in 1852. It was named from the forest at the original town site. The Forest Hill post office was discontinued in 1904.
