= Old Saint Louis, Indiana =

Old Saint Louis
- Unincorporated community
- Bartholomew County's location in Indiana

- Location in Bartholomew County
- Coordinates: 39°19′14″N 85°47′08″W
- Country: United States
- State: Indiana
- County: Bartholomew
- Township: Haw Creek
- Elevation: 725 ft (221 m)
- Time zone: UTC-5 (Eastern (EST))
  - Summer (DST): UTC-4 (EDT)
- ZIP code: 47246
- FIPS code: 18-56376
- GNIS feature ID: 440590

Old Saint Louis is an unincorporated community in Haw Creek Township, Bartholomew County, in the U.S. state of Indiana.

== History ==
Old Saint Louis was founded in 1836.
