= Adams Township, Decatur County, Indiana =

Township in Indiana, United States

Adams Township
- Township
- Location of Adams Township in Decatur County
- Coordinates: 39°25′28″N 85°35′5″W
- Country: United States
- State: Indiana
- County: Decatur

Government
  - Type: Indiana township

Area
  - Total: 32.97 sq mi (85.4 km^{2})
  - Land: 32.94 sq mi (85.3 km^{2})
  - Water: 0.04 sq mi (0.10 km^{2})
- Elevation: 807 ft (246 m)

Population (2020)
  - Total: 1,825
  - Density: 55.40/sq mi (21.39/km^{2})
- Time zone: UTC-5 (Eastern (EST))
  - Summer (DST): UTC-4 (EDT)
- ZIP code: 47240
- Area code: 812
- FIPS code: 18-00370
- GNIS feature ID: 0453076

Adams Township is one of nine townships in Decatur County, Indiana, United States. As of the 2020 census, its population was 1,825 (down from 1,944 at 2010) and it contained 818 housing units.

Historical population
Census	Pop.	Note	%±
1890	1,942		—
1900	1,867		−3.9%
1910	1,851		−0.9%
1920	1,647		−11.0%
1930	1,579		−4.1%
1940	1,558		−1.3%
1950	1,479		−5.1%
1960	1,609		8.8%
1970	1,657		3.0%
1980	1,903		14.8%
1990	1,889		−0.7%
2000	1,910		1.1%
2010	1,944		1.8%
2020	1,825		−6.1%
Source: US Decennial Census

== History ==
Adams Township was organized in 1822.

== Geography ==
According to the 2010 census, the township has a total area of 32.97 square miles (85.4 km^{2}), of which 32.94 square miles (85.3 km^{2}) (or 99.91%) is land and 0.04 square miles (0.10 km^{2}) (or 0.12%) is water.

=== Town ===
- Saint Paul

=== Unincorporated towns ===
- Adams
- Downeyville
- Germantown
- Saint Omer

(This list is based on USGS data and may include former settlements.)

=== Adjacent townships ===
- Orange Township, Rush County (north)
- Anderson Township, Rush County (northeast)
- Clinton Township (east)
- Washington Township (southeast)
- Clay Township (southwest)
- Noble Township, Shelby County (west)
- Liberty Township, Shelby County (northwest)

=== Major highways ===
- Interstate 74

=== Cemeteries ===
The township contains four cemeteries: Arnold, Mount Hebron, Shiloh and Union.
