= Germantown, New York (disambiguation) =

Germantown is the name of three places in the U.S. state of New York:

- Germantown (town), New York, in Columbia County
- Germantown (CDP), New York, in Columbia County
- Germantown, in the town of Clarksville, Allegany County, New York
- Germantown, in the city of Port Jervis, New York

== See also ==
- Germantown (disambiguation)
