= Clarksburg, Indiana =

- Census-designated place
- Location of Clarksburg in Decatur County, Indiana.

- Location within Indiana
- Coordinates: 39°26′06″N 85°20′57″W
- Country: United States
- State: Indiana
- County: Decatur
- Township: Fugit

Area
  - Total: 0.48 sq mi (1.24 km^{2})
  - Land: 0.48 sq mi (1.24 km^{2})
  - Water: 0 sq mi (0.00 km^{2})
- Elevation: 1,053 ft (321 m)

Population (2020)
  - Total: 127
  - Density: 265.1/sq mi (102.36/km^{2})
- ZIP code: 47240
- FIPS code: 18-12880
- GNIS feature ID: 2587015

Clarksburg is an unincorporated community and census-designated place in Fugit Township, Decatur County, Indiana, United States. As of the 2020 census, Clarksburg had a population of 127.

== History ==
Clarksburg was laid out in 1832. It was named for its founder, Woodson Clark.

The Clarksburg post office was established in 1835, but the name of the post office was officially spelled Clarksburgh until 1893.

John Miller, Justice of the Indiana Supreme Court, was born in Clarksburg in 1840.

== Geography ==
Clarksburg is located in northeastern Decatur County 12 miles (19 km) northeast of Greensburg, the county seat.

According to the U.S. Census Bureau, the Clarksburg CDP has an area of 0.48 square miles (1.24 km^{2}), all land.

== Demographics ==
Historical population
Census	Pop.	Note	%±
2020	127		—
U.S. Decennial Census

== Education ==
It is in Decatur County Community Schools.
