= Strauther Pleak Round Barn =

- U.S. National Register of Historic Places
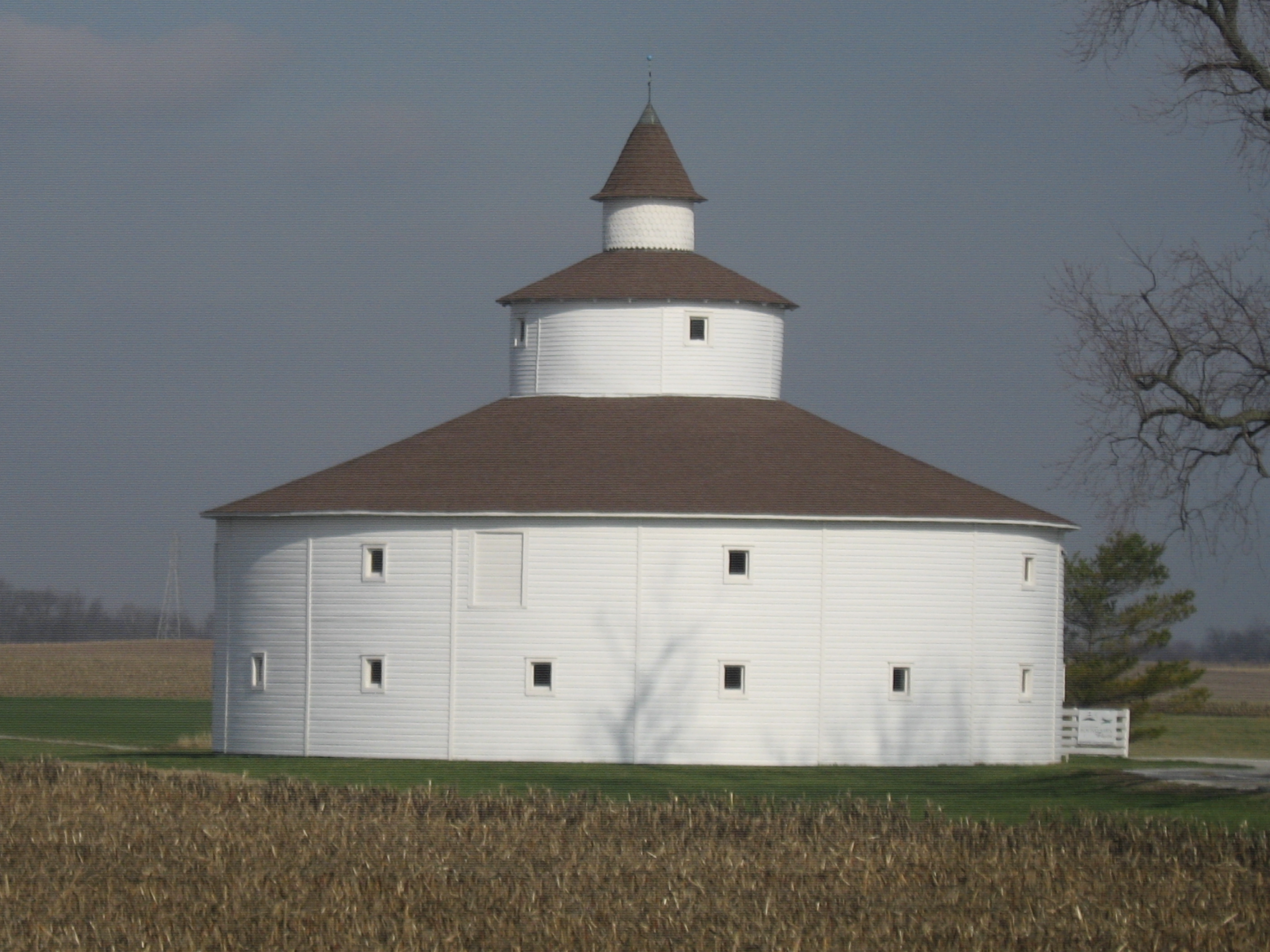
- View from the south

- Location within Indiana Location within the United States
- Location: Moscow Rd., 0.2 miles east of County Road 100W and north of Greensburg, Indiana
- Coordinates: 39°22′28″N 85°30′1″W
- Area: Less than 1 acre (0.40 ha)
- Built: 1914
- Architectural style: True-circular barn
- MPS: Round and Polygonal Barns of Indiana MPS
- NRHP reference No.: 93000557
- Added to NRHP: June 24, 1993

The Strauther Pleak Round Barn, also known as the "Pleak-Morgan Barn", is a round barn near Greensburg, Indiana, United States in Washington Township. Built in 1914, it was listed on the National Register of Historic Places in 1993. The barn is part of farmstead with a circa 1940 Indiana limestone ranch house, smoke house, spring house and garage. The main drive is looped enclosing a pen with a chicken coop and smaller barn.

== Exterior ==
The round, two-story barn is unusual with a conical roof, silo and cupola, looking like a three tiered wedding cake. The main roofing system is a conical design that is penetrated by the large silo with square, single-paned windows. The silo is in turn capped by a round cupola with an even steeper pitched conical roof. The attached rectangular barn (built 1915) has a gambrel roof. The balloon frame walls of both barns rest on poured concrete foundations. The roof has been covered with asphalt replacement shingles. Walls are original. The cupola has decorative shingles. Horizontal wood siding covers the silo and the barn. The rectangular barn is also covered in horizontal wood siding. The main entry is centered on east facade, the large doors of vertical wood pieces swing out to offer access. Above the doors is an upper level hay door. Around the structure are eight spaced square, single-paned windows on the lower level. On the northwest is a large sliding-door, then the attached rectangular barn and two more windows before returning to the main door. On the upper level, there is the upper hay doors, followed by a bay without a window, then a window positioned slightly lower than the other upper level units. Following this window is another upper level hay door of smaller, then five windows centered above the lower-level windows, along with another upper-level window to the north. The silo has four square, windows, located on the four compass points. The rectangular barn is very simple in design with equally spaced square windows along the east, west and north walls. There is a small sliding door on the south located near the connector to the round barn and a large door on the north that opens into the main drive.

== Interior ==
The interior of the barn has the exposed balloon framing and the circular laminated beam overhead at the barn's perimeter. The feed alley runs around the perimeter of the lower level, approximately 4 feet (1.2 m) wide. There is a gate that separates the central area from the main entrance. Moving around the lower level in a clockwise manner, the feed alley extends all the way around to the northwest corner where it breaks for the sliding door to the outside. On the north end of the barn, there are three large posts that open to the connector to the rectangular barn and form two openings with gates. Next is a built in concrete water trough used to water the animals and finally, a smaller feed alley returns to the main doors.

In the center of the space is the octagonal silo, which becomes a circle above the roofline. Originally constructed of 2 by 6 inches (5.1 by 15.2 cm) lumber stacked flat and coated on the inside with tar. The tar failed to seal the silo, so a brick and concrete plaster lining was added in 1917 creating a circular form on the inside, which becomes visible above the roof. The attached rectangular barn is composed of a series of pens on either side of a driveway that connects the "north door" with the round structure. There is also a small walkway that connects the main drive with the sliding door on the south.

The upper level is the haymow. The silo was constructed first and supports the roof. The balloon framing for the roof is tied into the silo. These members radiate inwardly from the exterior walls to the barn's central silo. Lath work supports the wood shingles. The area on the upper level is open with eight windows and two hay doors. As on the lower level, there are three posts that form two large openings to the rectangular barn on the north. The rectangular barn is left open for hay and straw storage.

== Significance ==
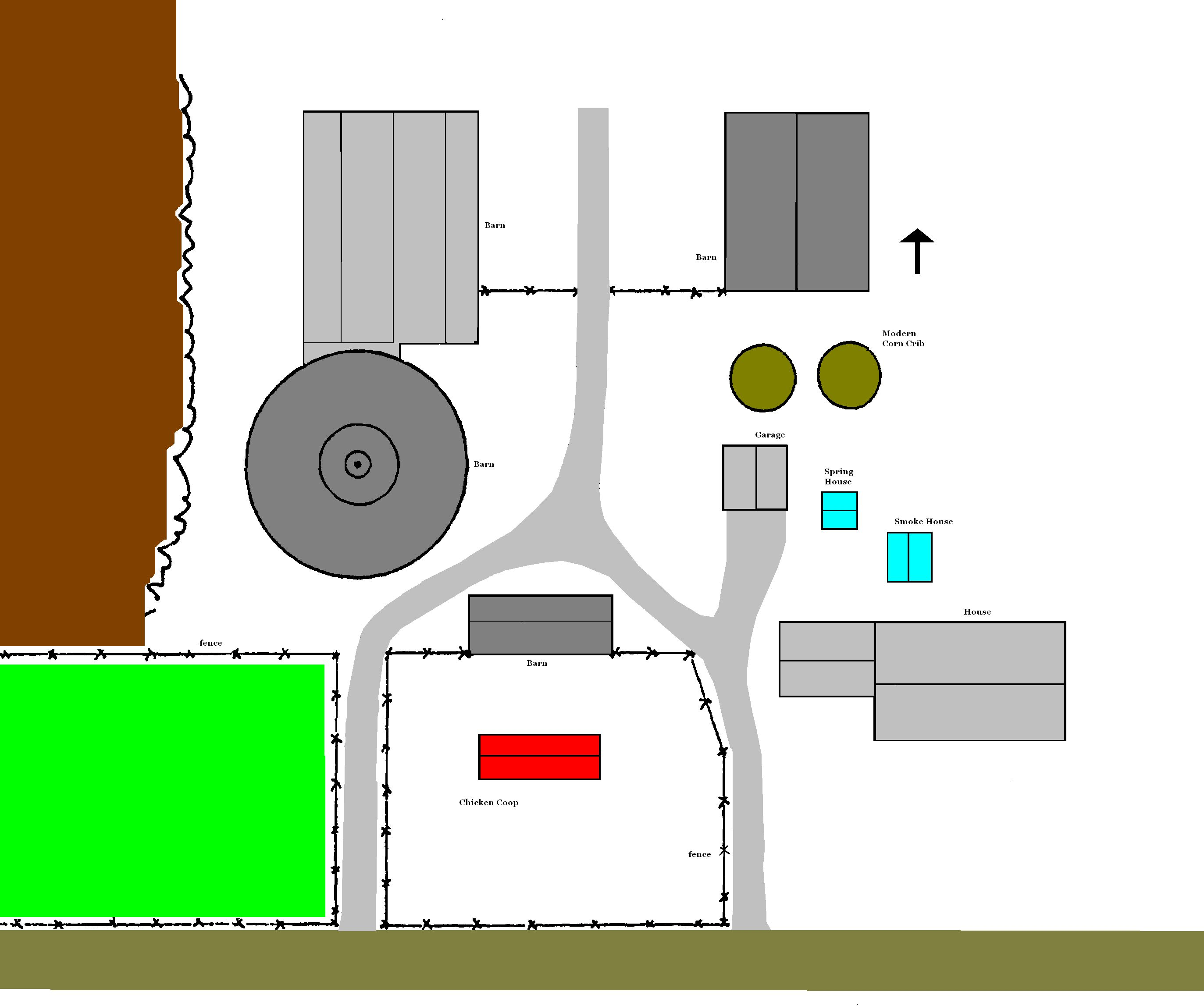
Farm plan of the Strauther Pleak Round Barn. Based on the map provided in the nomination documents for Nat'l Register of Hist. Places.

The Pleak Barn is a rare example of a round barn, which was later combined with a rectangular barn. The barn is a direct link to the agricultural development that occurred in the state from 1850 to 1936. The period of greatest significance of the barn was from 1914 to the mid-1930s when round and polygonal barns lost their popularity.

The barn is unique in its similar appearance to a three-tiered wedding cake. The three different roof sections of the lower level, silo, and spire are uncommon among round barns, with the spire featuring decorated shingles.

== Owners ==
The Pleak family maintained ownership of the farm until 1914 when it was sold to I.E. Morgan. The farm was then passed to I.B. Morgan's son, Ati, in 1937, with Ati Morgan (1993) being the current owner. Mr. Morgan's changes to the farm have been restricted to the construction of a 1940s era Indiana limestone ranch house, with no intrusive changes to the historic fabric of the round barn. In the late 90s the farm was sold to the Reed family, who still own the barn today. In the early 2000s, Richard Reed actively restored the barn to preserve the historic significance of the barn.

== Bibliography ==
- Hanou, John. Research compiled on Indiana's round and polygonal barns from 1986 to present. Archived at Historic Landmarks Foundation of Indiana, 340 West Michigan Street, Indianapolis, IN 46202.
- Intensive architectural survey of Indiana's round and polygonal barns, conducted June to August 1991, conducted by Jerry McMahan, areawide survey of round and polygonal architectural and historical resources.
- Morgan, Ati. Owner of the Pleak (Morgan) Barn, Greensburg, Indiana. Interviewed by Jerry McMahan, October 6, 1991.
- Soike, Lowell J. Without Right Angles, The Round Barns of Iowa. Des Moines, IA: Iowa State Historical Department, Office of Historic Preservation, 1983.
