= Champ's Ford Bridge =

- U.S. National Register of Historic Places
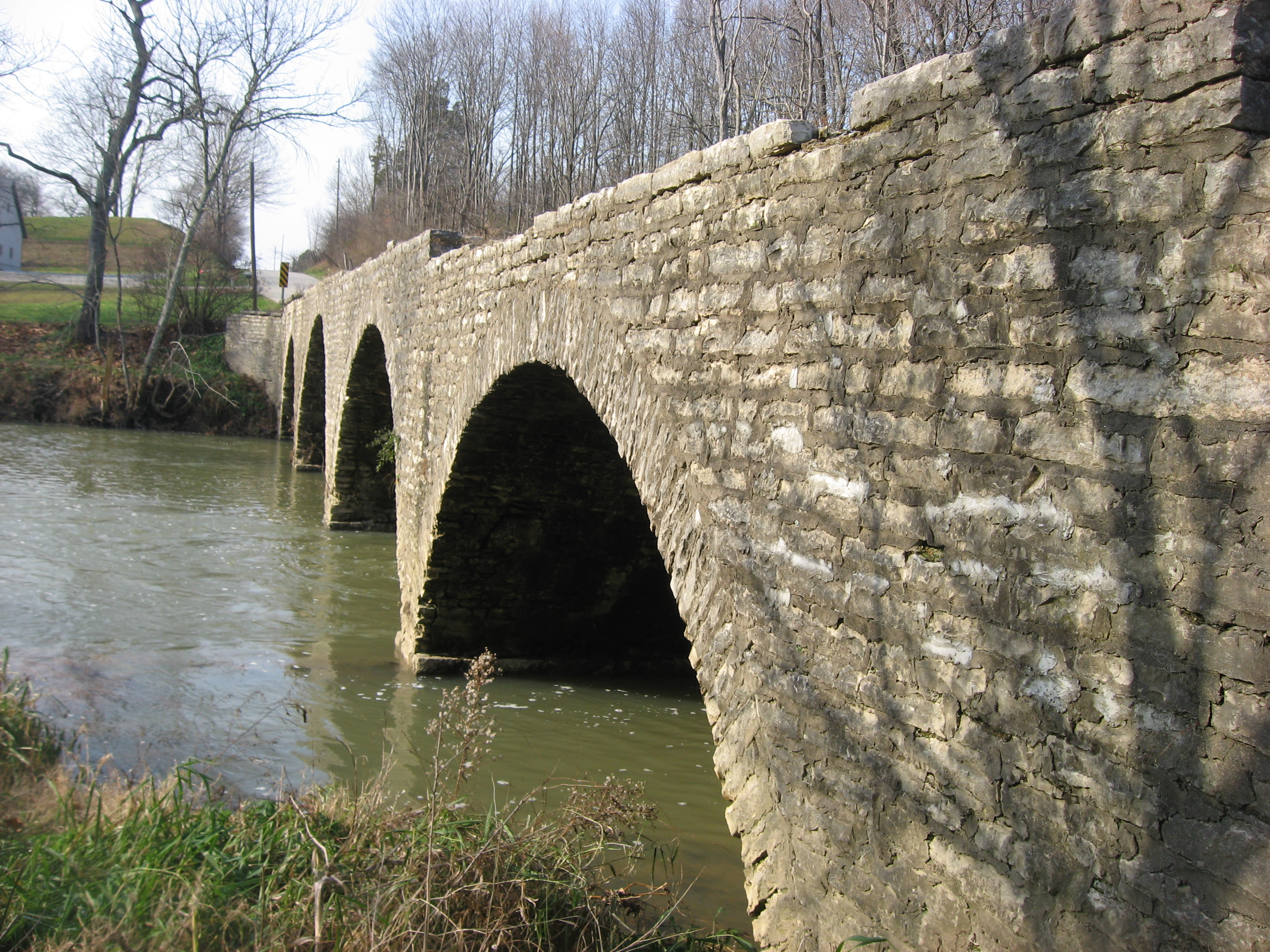
- Champ's Ford Bridge, December 2011

- Location within Indiana Location within the United States
- Location: County Road 100S over Clifty Creek, 2 miles west of Burney, Clay Township, Decatur County, Indiana
- Coordinates: 39°19′11″N 85°40′29″W
- Area: less than one acre
- Built: 1904
- Built by: Mathews, Joseph
- Architectural style: stone arch bridge
- NRHP reference No.: 09001127
- Added to NRHP: December 22, 2009

Champ's Ford Bridge, also known as Decatur County Bridge #124, is a historic stone arch bridge located in Clay Township, Decatur County, Indiana. It was built in 1904, and consists of four segmental arches constructed of Indiana Laurel limestone. It measures 118 feet long and 17 feet, 4 inches, wide.

It was added to the National Register of Historic Places in 2009.
