= Clifty Township, Bartholomew County, Indiana =

Clifty Township
- Township
- Location in Bartholomew County
- Coordinates: 39°13′35″N 85°43′58″W
- Country: United States
- State: Indiana
- County: Bartholomew

Government
  - Type: Indiana township

Area
  - Total: 22.85 sq mi (59.2 km^{2})
  - Land: 22.85 sq mi (59.2 km^{2})
  - Water: 0.01 sq mi (0.026 km^{2}) 0.04%
- Elevation: 728 ft (222 m)

Population (2020)
  - Total: 1,004
  - Density: 43.9/sq mi (16.9/km^{2})
- ZIP codes: 47203, 47244, 47246
- GNIS feature ID: 0453227

Clifty Township is one of twelve townships in Bartholomew County, Indiana, United States. As of the 2010 census, its population was 1,004 and it contained 400 housing units.

== Geography ==
According to the 2010 census, the township has a total area of 22.85 square miles (59.2 km^{2}), of which 22.85 square miles (59.2 km^{2}) (or 100%) is land and 0.01 square miles (0.026 km^{2}) (or 0.04%) is water.

=== Unincorporated towns ===
- Newbern

(This list is based on USGS data and may include former settlements.)

=== Adjacent townships ===
- Haw Creek Township (north)
- Clay Township, Decatur County (northeast)
- Jackson Township, Decatur County (east)
- Rock Creek Township (south)
- Clay Township (west)

=== Cemeteries ===
The township contains these two cemeteries: Little Sand Creek and Mount Pleasant.

=== Major highways ===
- Indiana State Road 46

== School districts ==
- Bartholomew Consolidated School Corporation

== Political districts ==
- Indiana's 6th congressional district
- State House District 57
- State Senate District 41
