= Knarr Corner, Indiana =

Knarr Corner
- Unincorporated community
- Location within Indiana Location within the United States
- Coordinates: 39°18′15″N 85°25′43″W
- Country: United States
- State: Indiana
- County: Decatur
- Township: Washington
- Elevation: 1,004 ft (306 m)
- ZIP code: 47240
- FIPS code: 18-40205
- GNIS feature ID: 437385

Knarr Corner is an unincorporated community in Washington Township, Decatur County, Indiana.
