= Germantown High School =

Germantown High School could refer to several secondary schools in the United States:

- Germantown High School (Mississippi), in Madison, Mississippi
- Germantown High School (Philadelphia), in Philadelphia, Pennsylvania
- Germantown High School (Tennessee), in Germantown, Tennessee
- Germantown High School (Wisconsin), in Germantown, Wisconsin

== See also ==
- Germantown (disambiguation)
