= Saint Omer, Indiana =

Saint Omer
- Unincorporated community and Census-designated place
- Location within Indiana Location within the United States
- Coordinates: 39°26′08″N 85°35′45″W
- Country: United States
- State: Indiana
- County: Decatur
- Township: Adams
- Elevation: 889 ft (271 m)
- ZIP code: 47272
- FIPS code: 18-67194
- GNIS feature ID: 2830353

Saint Omer is an unincorporated community in Adams Township, Decatur County, Indiana.

== History ==
Saint Omer was laid out in 1834. It was possibly named for Saint-Omer in France.

== Demographics ==
Historical population
Census	Pop.	Note	%±
2023 (est.)	46

The United States Census Bureau defined Saint Omer as a census designated place in the 2022 American Community Survey.
