= Sardinia, Indiana =

Sardinia
- Unincorporated community and Census-designated place
- Location within Indiana Location within the United States
- Coordinates: 39°09′11″N 85°37′52″W
- Country: United States
- State: Indiana
- County: Decatur
- Township: Jackson
- Elevation: 764 ft (233 m)
- ZIP code: 47283
- FIPS code: 18-68076
- GNIS feature ID: 2830355

Sardinia is an unincorporated community in Jackson Township, Decatur County, Indiana.

== History ==
Sardinia was laid out in 1865. It was likely named after the island of Sardinia.

== Demographics ==
Historical population
Census	Pop.	Note	%±
2023 (est.)	115

The United States Census Bureau defined Sardinia as a census designated place in the 2022 American Community Survey.
