= Sandusky, Indiana =

Sandusky
- Unincorporated community and Census-designated place
- Location within Indiana Location within the United States
- Coordinates: 39°25′15″N 85°28′48″W
- Country: United States
- State: Indiana
- County: Decatur
- Township: Clinton
- Elevation: 938 ft (286 m)
- ZIP code: 47240
- FIPS code: 18-67896
- GNIS feature ID: 2830354

Sandusky is an unincorporated community in Clinton Township, Decatur County, Indiana.

== History ==
Sandusky was laid out 1882 along the railroad that was built through it. It was likely named after Sandusky, Ohio. A post office was established at Sandusky in 1882, and remained in operation until it was discontinued in 1905.

== Demographics ==
Historical population
Census	Pop.	Note	%±
2023 (est.)	26

The United States Census Bureau defined Sandusky as a census designated place in the 2022 American Community Survey.
