= New Point, Indiana =

- Town
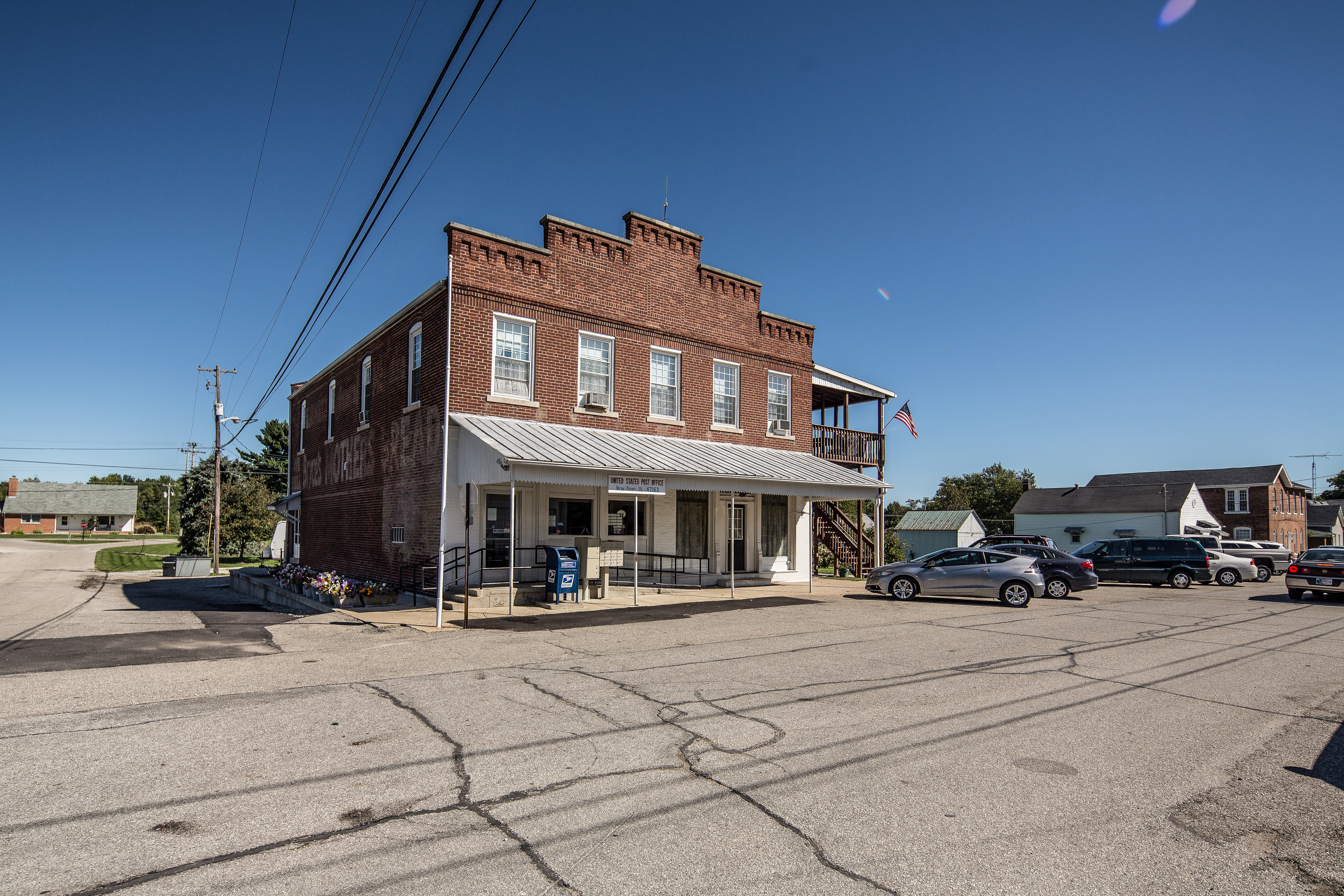

- Location of New Point in Decatur County, Indiana.
- Coordinates: 39°18′34″N 85°19′37″W
- Country: United States
- State: Indiana
- County: Decatur
- Township: Salt Creek

Area
  - Total: 0.31 sq mi (0.81 km^{2})
  - Land: 0.31 sq mi (0.81 km^{2})
  - Water: 0 sq mi (0.00 km^{2})
- Elevation: 978 ft (298 m)

Population (2020)
  - Total: 319
  - Density: 1,022.2/sq mi (394.67/km^{2})
- Time zone: UTC-5 (Eastern (EST))
  - Summer (DST): UTC-4 (EDT)
- ZIP code: 47263
- Area code: 812
- FIPS code: 18-53478
- GNIS feature ID: 2396807
- Website: townofnewpoint.com

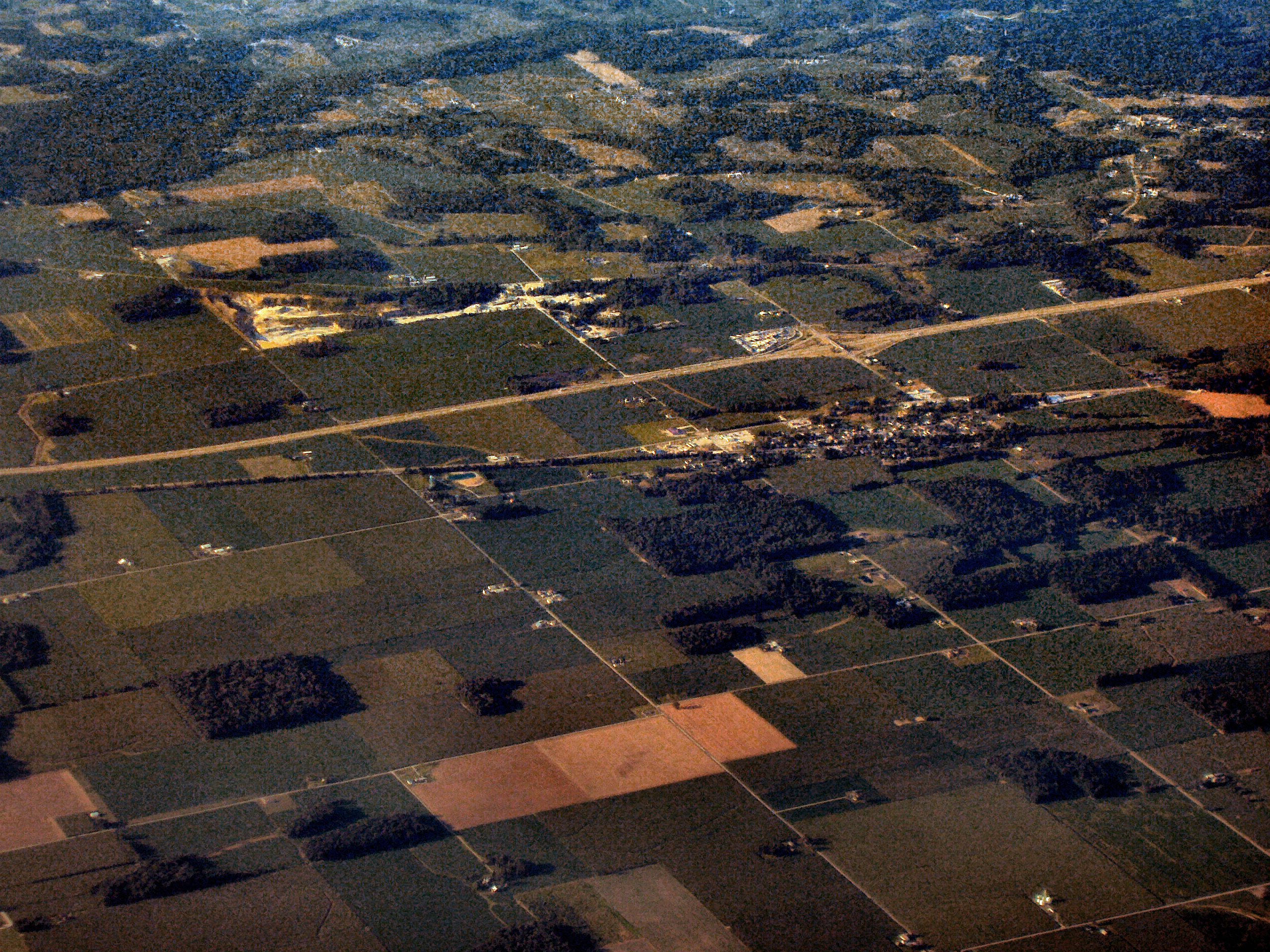
New Point from the air, looking northeast.

New Point is a town in Salt Creek Township, Decatur County, Indiana, United States. As of the 2020 census, New Point had a population of 319.

== History ==
New Point was laid out in 1859.

== Geography ==
The town is located approximately one-half mile south of Interstate 74 at Exit 143. (State Highway 46 runs parallel to the town on its north side.) Utilities include city water and city sewage. At the present there is no natural gas piped to the town. The closest connection is 5.5 miles to the east on State Highway 46.

According to the 2010 census, New Point has a total area of 0.22 square miles (0.57 km^{2}), all land.

The town is divided geographically by an active railway running east to Cincinnati, Ohio and west to Indianapolis, Indiana. Tub Creek, a tiny stream, originates just north of New Point and runs through it from north to south.

== Demographics ==
Historical population
Census	Pop.	Note	%±
1880	174		—
1900	451		—
1910	341		−24.4%
1920	317		−7.0%
1930	342		7.9%
1940	328		−4.1%
1950	322		−1.8%
1960	319		−0.9%
1970	381		19.4%
1980	296		−22.3%
1990	296		0.0%
2000	290		−2.0%
2010	331		14.1%
2020	319		−3.6%
U.S. Decennial Census

=== 2010 census ===
As of the census of 2010, there were 331 people, 124 households, and 84 families residing in the town. The population density was 1,504.5 inhabitants per square mile (580.9/km^{2}). There were 139 housing units at an average density of 631.8 per square mile (243.9/km^{2}). The racial makeup of the town was 99.4% White, 0.3% Asian, and 0.3% from two or more races. Hispanic or Latino of any race were 0.6% of the population.

There were 124 households, of which 39.5% had children under the age of 18 living with them, 48.4% were married couples living together, 12.9% had a female householder with no husband present, 6.5% had a male householder with no wife present, and 32.3% were non-families. 23.4% of all households were made up of individuals, and 11.3% had someone living alone who was 65 years of age or older. The average household size was 2.67 and the average family size was 3.18.

The median age in the town was 36.6 years. 28.1% of residents were under the age of 18; 5.8% were between the ages of 18 and 24; 26% were from 25 to 44; 25.1% were from 45 to 64; and 15.1% were 65 years of age or older. The gender makeup of the town was 51.4% male and 48.6% female.

=== 2000 census ===
As of the census of 2000, there were 290 people, 106 households, and 82 families residing in the town. The population density was 1,061.8 inhabitants per square mile (410.0/km^{2}). There were 116 housing units at an average density of 424.7 per square mile (164.0/km^{2}). The racial makeup of the town was 98.62% White, 0.34% African American, 0.34% Asian, 0.34% from other races, and 0.34% from two or more races. Hispanic or Latino of any race were 0.34% of the population.

There were 106 households, out of which 38.7% had children under the age of 18 living with them, 63.2% were married couples living together, 10.4% had a female householder with no husband present, and 21.7% were non-families. 17.0% of all households were made up of individuals, and 7.5% had someone living alone who was 65 years of age or older. The average household size was 2.74 and the average family size was 3.04.

In the town, the population was spread out, with 27.2% under the age of 18, 6.2% from 18 to 24, 33.1% from 25 to 44, 19.3% from 45 to 64, and 14.1% who were 65 years of age or older. The median age was 36 years. For every 100 females, there were 116.4 males. For every 100 females age 18 and over, there were 102.9 males.

The median income for a household in the town was $39,583, and the median income for a family was $40,694. Males had a median income of $31,607 versus $28,750 for females. The per capita income for the town was $21,116. About 6.6% of families and 7.3% of the population were below the poverty line, including 12.0% of those under the age of eighteen and 5.3% of those 65 or over.

== Miscellany ==
The community boasts a small post office, community center, park, and a volunteer fire department.

There are two churches: The New Point Christian Church and The New Point Baptist Church.

The town is governed by a board of elected officials.

The community has an annual festival called Crackaway Daze which is held on the third full weekend of September. There is also an annual Volunteer Fireman's Picnic held at the firestation to raise money for funding for the fire department, including food, games, a dunk tank, and raffle.

There once was a school where the park is currently located. This school was no longer used after the consolidation of community schools into a larger county school corporation (North and South Decatur Schools). The park is now used for the Crackaway Daze festival, local events, and little league.
