= Downeyville, Indiana =

Downeyville
- Unincorporated community
- Location within Indiana Location within the United States
- Coordinates: 39°25′39″N 85°33′16″W
- Country: United States
- State: Indiana
- County: Decatur
- Township: Adams
- Elevation: 837 ft (255 m)
- ZIP code: 47240
- FIPS code: 18-18604
- GNIS feature ID: 433674

Downeyville is an unincorporated community in Adams Township, Decatur County, Indiana.

== History ==
Downey was the name of a family who kept a general store at Downeyville. A post office was established at Downeyville in 1876, and remained in operation until it was discontinued in 1903.
