= Harris City, Indiana =

Harris City
- Unincorporated community
- Location within Indiana Location within the United States
- Coordinates: 39°16′53″N 85°31′38″W
- Country: United States
- State: Indiana
- County: Decatur
- Township: Sand Creek
- Elevation: 827 ft (252 m)
- ZIP code: 47240
- FIPS code: 18-31594
- GNIS feature ID: 435781

Harris City is an unincorporated community in Sand Creek Township, Decatur County, Indiana.

== History ==
Harris City was named for B. B. Harris, who owned a large blue limestone quarry which was in the 19th century the center of the town's industry.

Harris City contained a post office between 1874 and 1898; the post office was called Harris in its final years.
