= Little Germany, Ontario =

Little Germany, Ontario can mean the following:

- Little Germany, Grey County, Ontario
- Little Germany, Northumberland County, Ontario
