= Waynesburg, Indiana =

Unincorporated community in Indiana, U.S.

Coordinates: 39°12′40″N 85°40′10″W

Waynesburg, is an unincorporated community in Decatur County, Indiana, in the United States.

== History ==
Waynesburg was laid out in 1844. Waynesburg had a post office between 1854 and 1902.
