= Slabtown, Indiana =

Slabtown
- Unincorporated community
- Location within Indiana Location within the United States
- Coordinates: 39°16′42″N 85°24′05″W
- Country: United States
- State: Indiana
- County: Decatur
- Township: Marion
- Elevation: 978 ft (298 m)
- ZIP code: 47240
- FIPS code: 18-70030
- GNIS feature ID: 443589

Slabtown is an unincorporated community in Marion Township, Decatur County, Indiana.

== History ==
Slabs used to lay plank roads were manufactured here, hence the name.
