= Germantown Township =

Germantown Township may refer to the following townships in the United States:

- Germantown Township, Clinton County, Illinois
- Germantown Township, Cottonwood County, Minnesota
- Germantown Township, Pennsylvania, in Philadelphia County
- Germantown Township, Turner County, South Dakota
