= Slabtown, West Virginia =

Slabtown
- Unincorporated community
- Location within the state of West Virginia Slabtown (the United States)
- Coordinates: 37°37′44″N 81°52′11″W
- Country: United States
- State: West Virginia
- County: Mingo
- Elevation: 817 ft (249 m)
- Time zone: UTC-5 (Eastern (EST))
  - Summer (DST): UTC-4 (EDT)
- GNIS ID: 1555642

Slabtown is an unincorporated community in Mingo County, West Virginia, United States.
