= Mechanicsburg, Decatur County, Indiana =

Unincorporated community in Indiana, U.S.

Coordinates: 39°20′14″N 85°22′01″W

Mechanicsburg is an unincorporated community in Salt Creek Township, Decatur County, Indiana, in the United States.

== History ==
Mechanicsburg was laid out in 1846.
