= Milroy, Indiana =

- Unincorporated community and Census-designated place
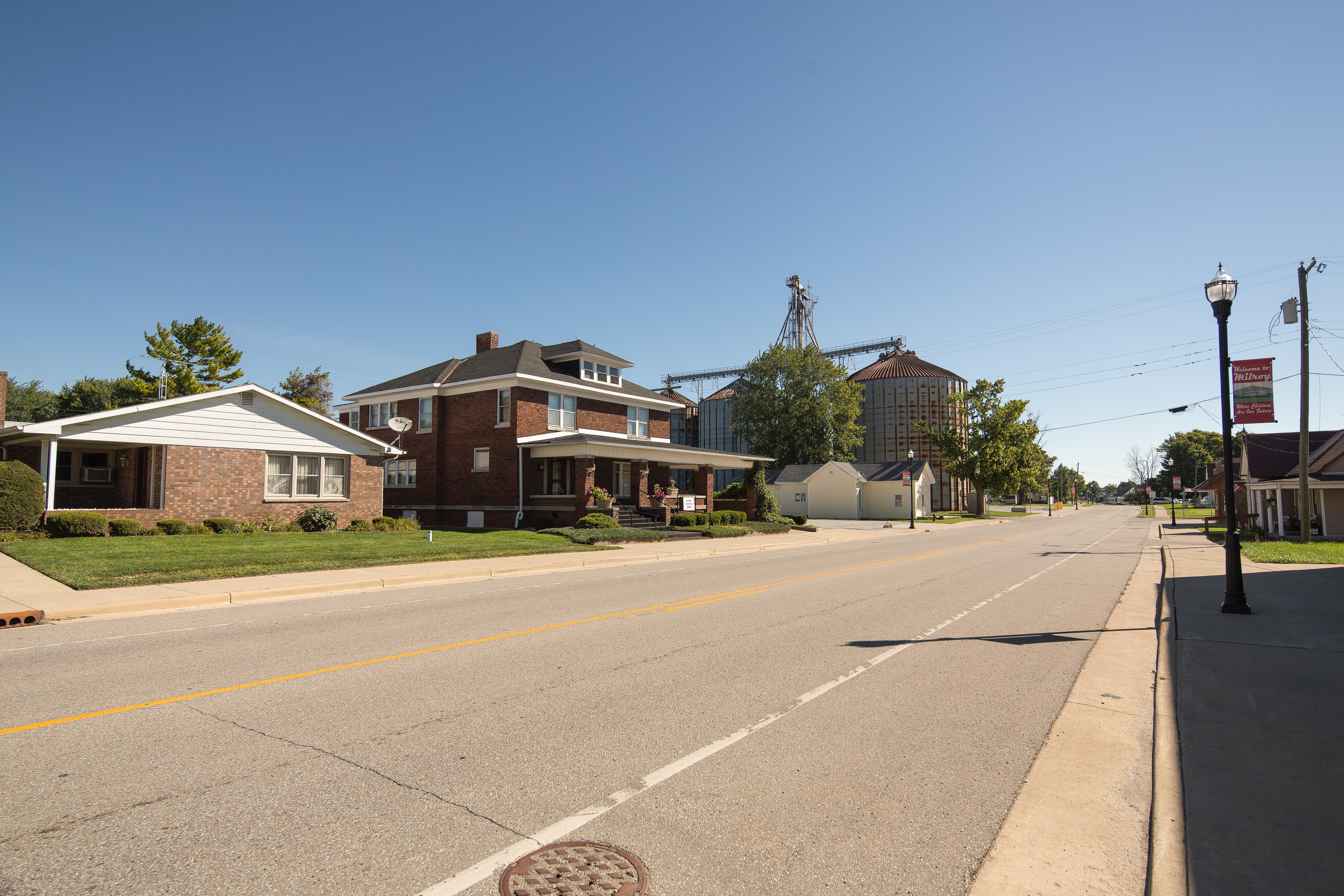

- Location of Milroy in Rush County, Indiana.
- Coordinates: 39°30′02″N 85°28′02″W
- Country: United States
- State: Indiana
- County: Rush
- Township: Anderson

Area
  - Total: 0.66 sq mi (1.72 km^{2})
  - Land: 0.66 sq mi (1.72 km^{2})
  - Water: 0 sq mi (0.00 km^{2})
- Elevation: 965 ft (294 m)

Population (2020)
  - Total: 628
  - Density: 948.2/sq mi (366.11/km^{2})
- Time zone: UTC-5 (Eastern (EST))
  - Summer (DST): UTC-4 (EDT)
- ZIP code: 46156
- Area code: 765
- GNIS feature ID: 2629873

Milroy is a census-designated place in Anderson Township, in the southern part of Rush County, in the U.S. state of Indiana.

As of the 2020 census, Milroy had a population of 628.

== History ==
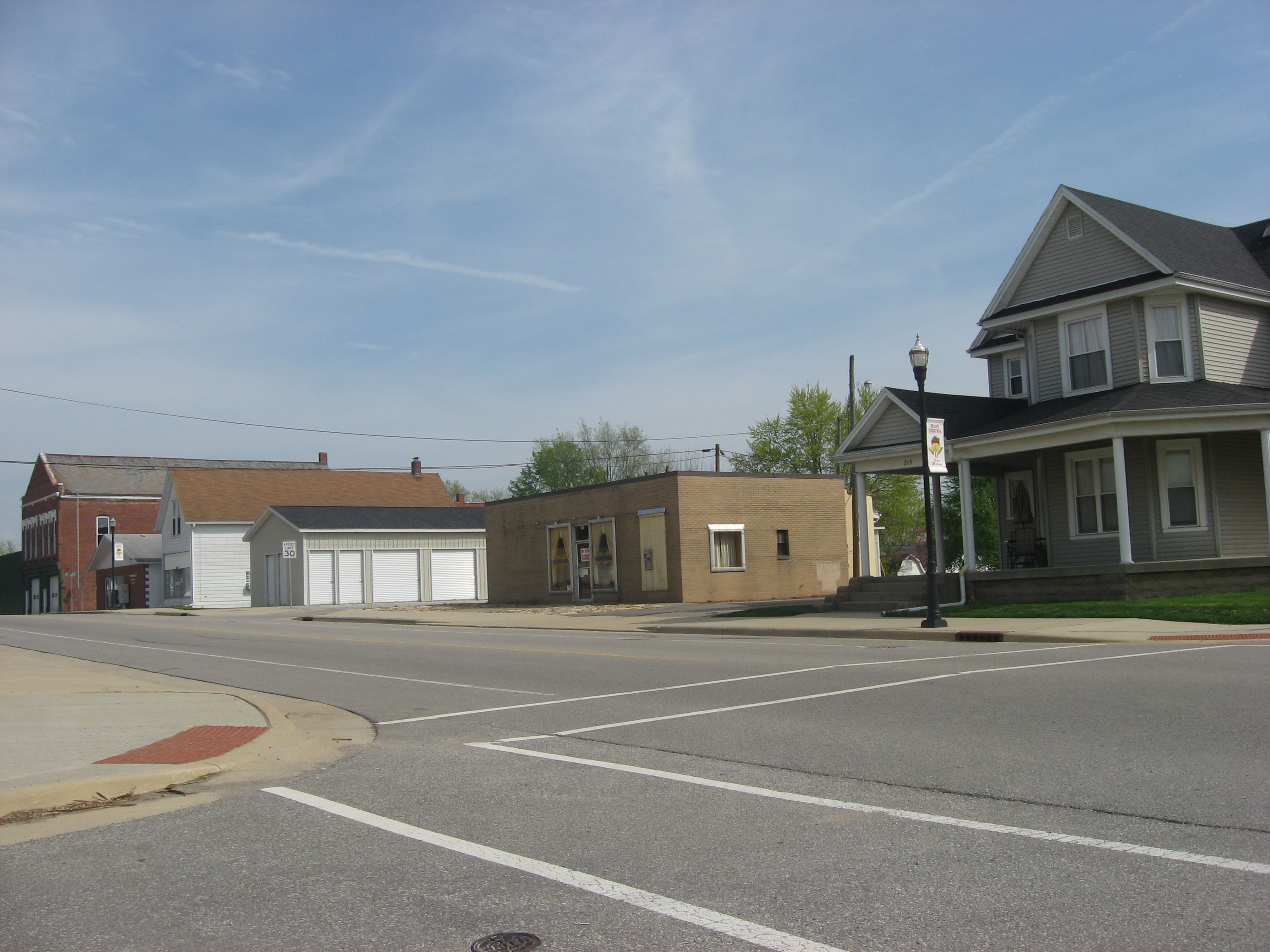
Main Street

Milroy was laid out and platted in 1830. The Milroy post office has been in operation since 1832.

== Education ==
The community contains Milroy Elementary School, a public school in the county school district.

== Demographics ==
Historical population
Census	Pop.	Note	%±
2020	628		—
U.S. Decennial Census
