= Kingston, Indiana =

Unincorporated community in Indiana, U.S.

Coordinates: 39°22′44″N 85°23′18″W

Kingston is an unincorporated community in Decatur County, Indiana, in the United States.

== History ==
Kingston was laid out in 1851.
