= Milford, Decatur County, Indiana =

Milford
- Unincorporated community Census designated place Former town
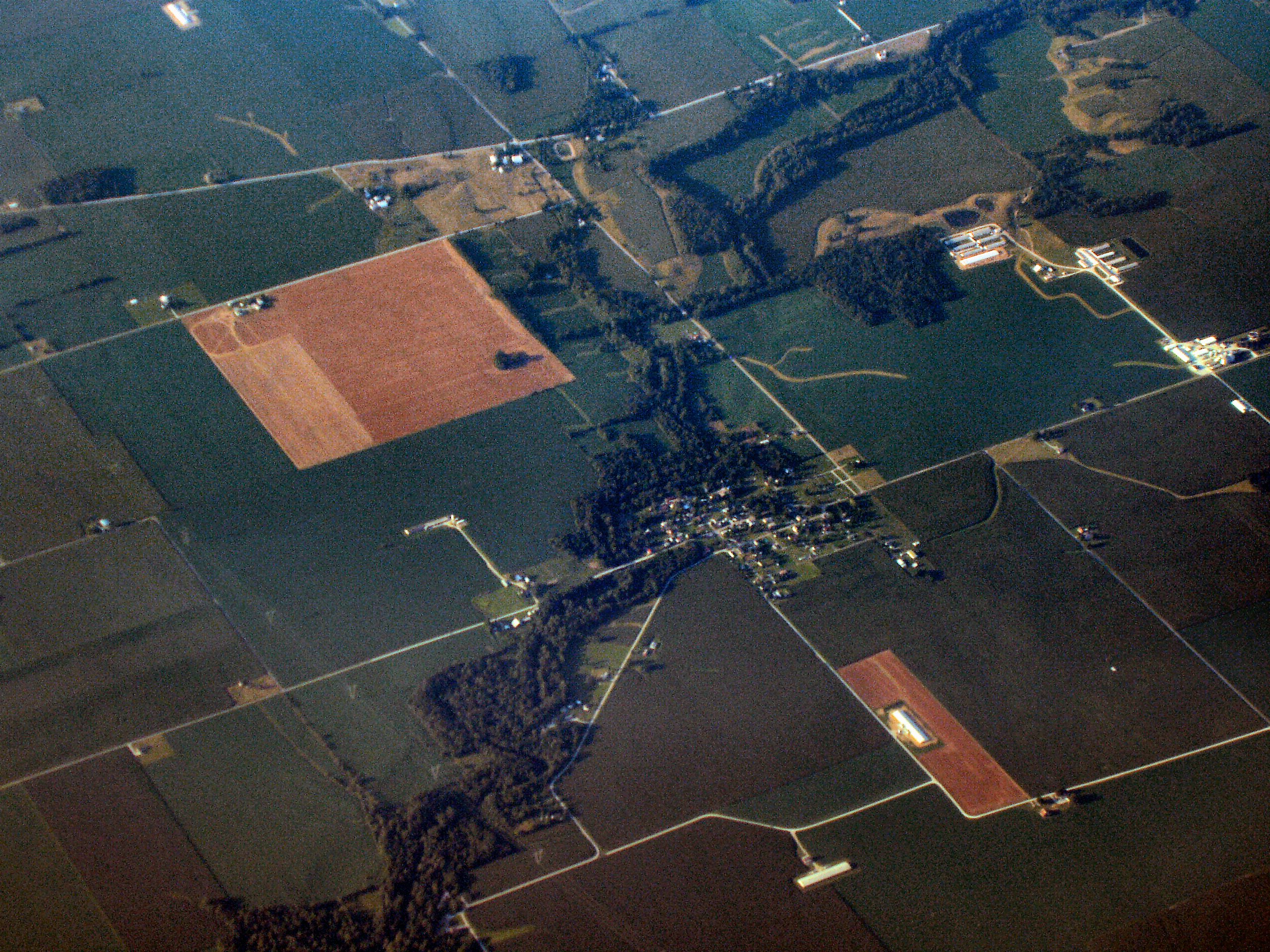
- Milford from the air, looking northeast

- Location within Indiana
- Coordinates: 39°21′01″N 85°37′11″W
- Country: United States
- State: Indiana
- County: Decatur

Area
  - Total: 0.1 sq mi (0.26 km^{2})
  - Land: 0.1 sq mi (0.26 km^{2})
- Elevation: 843 ft (257 m)

Population (2000)
  - Total: 121
  - Density: 1,200/sq mi (470/km^{2})
- FIPS code
- GNIS feature ID: 2396762

Milford is a town in Decatur County, Indiana, United States.

== History ==
Milford was platted in 1835. It was named for the presence of a mill on a ford. It was incorporated around 1888 but voted to disincorporate in 2007.

== Geography ==
According to the United States Census Bureau, the town has a total area of 0.1 square mile (0.2 km^{2}), all land.

== Demographics ==
After being disincorporated in 2007, the United States Census Bureau stop collecting data for the community until it was relisted as a census designated place in the 2022 American Community Survey.

=== 2000 census ===
As of the census of 2000, there were 121 people, 48 households, and 37 families in the town. The population density was 1,349.1 inhabitants per square mile (520.9/km^{2}). There were 54 housing units at an average density of 602.1 per square mile (232.5/km^{2}). The racial makeup of the town was 100.00% White.

Of the 48 households 29.2% had children under the age of 18 living with them, 60.4% were married couples living together, 8.3% had a female householder with no husband present, and 22.9% were non-families. 20.8% of households were one person and 6.3% were one person aged 65 or older. The average household size was 2.52 and the average family size was 2.89.

The age distribution was 25.6% under the age of 18, 12.4% from 18 to 24, 24.0% from 25 to 44, 27.3% from 45 to 64, and 10.7% 65 or older. The median age was 37 years. For every 100 females, there were 105.1 males. For every 100 females age 18 and over, there were 95.7 males.

The median household income was $30,781 and the median family income was $31,406. Males had a median income of $31,250 versus $19,167 for females. The per capita income for the town was $12,506. There were 12.2% of families and 15.9% of the population living below the poverty line, including 3.4% of under eighteens and 11.5% of those over 64.
