= Germantown, Worcester County, Maryland =

Unincorporated community in Maryland, United States

Germantown, Maryland
- Unincorporated community
- Location within Maryland
- Coordinates: 38°18′30″N 75°12′35″W
- Country: United States
- State: Maryland
- County: Worcester
- Elevation: 30 ft (9.1 m)
- Time zone: UTC-5 (Eastern (EST))
  - Summer (DST): UTC-4 (EDT)
- ZIP code: 21811
- Area codes: 410, 443, and 667
- GNIS feature ID: 590294

Germantown is an unincorporated community in Worcester County, Maryland, United States. It is located at 38°18′30″N 75°12′35″W at the intersection of Germantown and Bethel roads, southeast of Berlin.

This historically black community is the location of several AME churches, including Tyree AME, begun by relatives of Methodist minister the Rev. Dr. Charles Tindley, the man whose hymn "I Shall Overcome" became the germ for the civil rights anthem, "We Shall Overcome."

Germantown Road crosses Route 113 to become South Main St of Berlin, MD ("America's Coolest Small Town" 2014). At one time the community was known as Germantown, possibly in reference to the name Berlin, whose derivation is questioned, some saying it's a morphology of Burley Inn.

Historically, Berlin and Germantown are nearly totally segregated. While some whites and Latinos now live on the east side of 113, hardly any black families own property in Berlin on the west side of 113.

Parts of Germantown are within Berlin town limits, including Tyree church.

Like other low elevation parts of Worcester County, Germantown contributes to the subtle wetland ecosystem feeding into Newport Bay. At one time, long carefully maintained ditches were essential to prevent flooding and allow for agriculture. The soil there, like much of Worcester county and the Maryland Eastern Shore in general, is often USDA prime agricultural soil, a deep black humus enriched loam topsoil with a clayey loam base. Hardly any stones are encountered. However, the soil can be variable, and wooded areas can be deep with centuries of leaf mold. In general, soft ground, especially during spring, after snow melt and rains, is a perennial problem. Wells and septic systems are used, either new expensive and finicky sand mounds or like most something which was grandfathered in. The forest is dense, and similar to that of surrounding areas, with abundant sweet gum pioneers eventually giving way to large, often massive loblolly pines.

Loss of property by tax lien auctions held annually by Worcester county for properties 2 years in arrears is a persistent threat to black property ownership, though many families can trace family homes going back to the Reconstruction. Tax liens are often purchased by local or in state investors, out of state LLCs domiciled in Delaware, and on occasion large foreign conglomerates looking for anything approximate to Atlantic coastal areas. Much of the properties are rentals, with absentee landlords using local real estate agents as property managers. These are notably poorly maintained, but generally the owner occupied single family houses are cared for with pride, even the most humble ones.
