= Germantown, Decatur County, Indiana =

Germantown
- Unincorporated community
- Location within Indiana Location within the United States
- Coordinates: 39°24′55″N 85°37′35″W
- Country: United States
- State: Indiana
- County: Decatur
- Township: Adams
- Elevation: 846 ft (258 m)
- ZIP code: 47272
- FIPS code: 18-27504
- GNIS feature ID: 447643

Germantown is an unincorporated community in Adams Township, Decatur County, Indiana.

A large share of the early settlers being natives of Germany likely caused the name to be selected.
