= Anderson Township, Rush County, Indiana =

Anderson Township
- Township
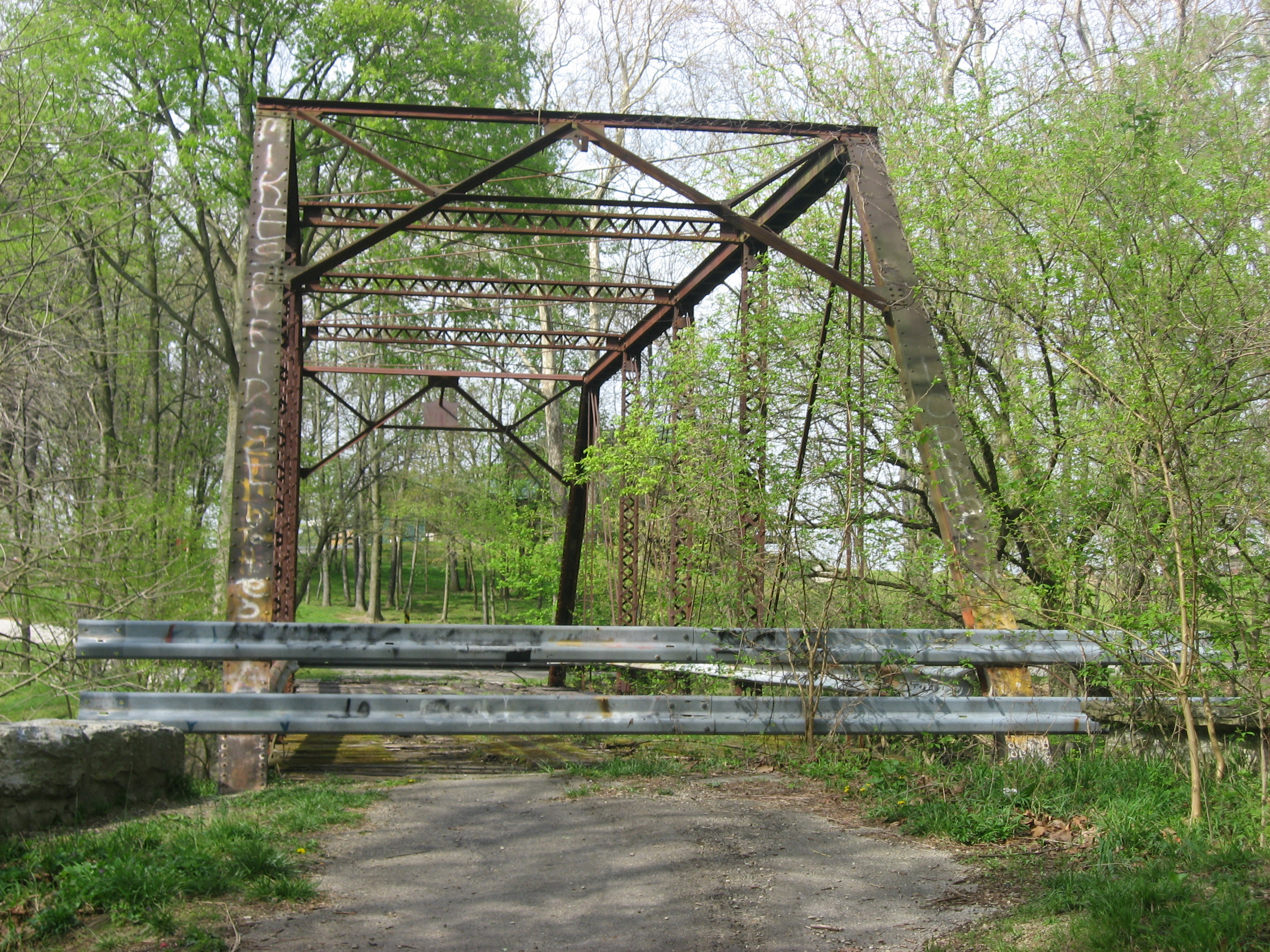
- Bridge No. 188, a historic site in the township

- Coordinates: 39°29′50″N 85°27′42″W
- Country: United States
- State: Indiana
- County: Rush

Government
  - Type: Indiana township

Area
  - Total: 35.42 sq mi (91.7 km^{2})
  - Land: 35.39 sq mi (91.7 km^{2})
  - Water: 0.03 sq mi (0.078 km^{2})
- Elevation: 955 ft (291 m)

Population (2020)
  - Total: 1,247
  - Density: 35.24/sq mi (13.60/km^{2})
- Time zone: UTC-5 (Eastern (EST))
  - Summer (DST): UTC-4 (EDT)
- Area code: 765
- FIPS code: 18-01522
- GNIS feature ID: 453089

Anderson Township is one of twelve townships in Rush County, Indiana. As of the 2020 census, the population is 1,247. There are a total of 481 houses.

Historical population
Census	Pop.	Note	%±
1890	1,579		—
1900	1,481		−6.2%
1910	1,602		8.2%
1920	1,457		−9.1%
1930	1,395		−4.3%
1940	1,310		−6.1%
1950	1,428		9.0%
1960	1,399		−2.0%
1970	1,463		4.6%
1980	1,487		1.6%
1990	1,342		−9.8%
2000	1,363		1.6%
2010	1,251		−8.2%
2020	1,247		−0.3%
Source: US Decennial Census

== History ==
Anderson Township was organized in 1830.

The Rush County Bridge No. 188 was listed on the National Register of Historic Places in 2000.

== Geography ==
According to the 2020 census, the township has a total area of 35.42 square miles (91.7 km^{2}), of which 35.39 square miles (91.7 km^{2}) (or 99.92%) is land and 0.03 square miles (0.078 km^{2}) (or 0.08%) is water.

=== Unincorporated towns ===
- Milroy at 39.4969927°N 85.4696924°W
- Williamstown at 39.4528266°N 85.4691367°W

(This list is based on USGS data and may include former settlements.)

== Other statistics ==
The median age of Anderson Township is 51.8 years old. The population is 51% female & 49% male. 96% of the population is white, while 4% is Hispanic. A little under 1% are two or more races. The per capita income is $25,021 while the median household income is $54,583. There are 477 households in Anderson Township, with an average of 2.4 persons in each household.
