= National Register of Historic Places listings in Bartholomew County, Indiana =

Location of Bartholomew County in Indiana

This is a list of the National Register of Historic Places listings in Bartholomew County, Indiana.

This is intended to be a complete list of the properties and districts on the National Register of Historic Places in Bartholomew County, Indiana, United States. Latitude and longitude coordinates are provided for many National Register properties and districts; these locations may be seen together in a map.

There are 25 properties and districts listed on the National Register in the county, including seven National Historic Landmarks.

Properties and districts located in incorporated areas display the name of the municipality, while properties and districts in unincorporated areas display the name of their civil township. Properties and districts split between multiple jurisdictions display the names of all jurisdictions.

This National Park Service list is complete through NPS recent listings posted September 26, 2025.

== Current listings ==
	Name on the Register	Image	Date listed	Location	City or town	Description
1	David Aikens House	David Aikens House	June 6, 2001 (#01000621)	2325 Jonesville Rd., southwest of Columbus; 39°10′27″N 85°55′48″W	Columbus Township	
2	Bartholomew County Courthouse	Bartholomew County Courthouse	November 15, 1979 (#79000031)	3rd and Washington Sts. 39°12′04″N 85°55′17″W	Columbus	
3	Columbus City Hall	Columbus City Hall	November 15, 1979 (#79000032)	5th and Franklin Sts. 39°12′11″N 85°55′13″W	Columbus	
4	Columbus Historic District	Columbus Historic District	December 10, 1982 (#82000059)	Roughly bounded by the former Pennsylvania railroad tracks, Chestnut, 34th, Washington, and Franklin Sts. 39°12′23″N 85°55′04″W	Columbus	
5	Elnora Daugherty Farm	Elnora Daugherty Farm	June 4, 1992 (#92000676)	5541 E. 500S, south of Columbus; 39°07′39″N 85°51′43″W	Sand Creek Township	
6	James and Annetta Daugherty House and Barn	James and Annetta Daugherty House and Barn	December 2, 2020 (#100005878)	6443 South Jonesville Rd. 39°08′26″N 85°54′37″W	Wayne Township	
7	Evans Lustron House	Evans Lustron House	February 9, 2022 (#100007445)	2121 Pennsylvania St. 39°13′11″N 85°54′10″W	Columbus	
8	First Baptist Church	First Baptist Church	May 16, 2000 (#00000707)	3300 Fairlawn Dr. 39°14′01″N 85°52′20″W	Columbus	Designed by Harry Weese
9	First Christian Church	First Christian Church	January 3, 2001 (#01000067)	531 5th St. 39°12′11″N 85°55′08″W	Columbus	Designed by Eliel Saarinen
10	William R. Gant Farm	William R. Gant Farm	September 22, 2000 (#00001134)	5890 S175E, south of Columbus; 39°08′48″N 85°52′47″W	Sand Creek Township	
11	Haw Creek Leather Company	Haw Creek Leather Company	December 17, 1998 (#98001526)	Junction of Washington and 1st Sts. 39°11′57″N 85°55′17″W	Columbus	
12	D.W. Heagy Farm	D.W. Heagy Farm	August 14, 1998 (#98001052)	3005 W. 200S, southwest of Columbus; 39°10′14″N 85°57′23″W	Columbus Township	
13	Hope Historic District	Hope Historic District	December 19, 1991 (#91001864)	Roughly bounded by Haw Creek, Grand St., Walnut St., and South St. 39°18′04″N 85°46′13″W	Hope	
14	Irwin Union Bank and Trust	Irwin Union Bank and Trust	May 16, 2000 (#00000704)	500 Washington St. 39°12′13″N 85°55′17″W	Columbus	
15	Irwin Union Bank and Trust, Eastbrook Plaza Branch		March 3, 2025 (#100011483)	2531 Eastbrook Plaza; 39°13′25″N 85°53′37″W	Columbus	
16	James Marr House and Farm	James Marr House and Farm	October 23, 1980 (#80000052)	Northeast of Columbus on Marr Rd. 39°15′22″N 85°52′50″W	Columbus, Flat Rock, and German Townships	
17	Mabel McDowell Elementary School	Mabel McDowell Elementary School	January 3, 2001 (#01000068)	2700 McKinley Ave. 39°12′07″N 85°53′31″W	Columbus	
18	McEwen-Samuels-Marr House	McEwen-Samuels-Marr House	May 22, 1978 (#78000045)	524 3rd St. 39°12′06″N 85°55′08″W	Columbus	
19	McKinley School	McKinley School	August 25, 1988 (#88001221)	17th St. and Home Ave. 39°12′57″N 85°54′44″W	Columbus	
20	Miller House	Miller House	May 16, 2000 (#00000706)	2760 Highland Way; 39°13′38″N 85°55′23″W	Columbus	Designed by Eero Saarinen
21	New Hope Bridge	New Hope Bridge	September 9, 1999 (#99001104)	County Road 400N over the Flatrock River, north of Columbus; 39°15′34″N 85°55′19″W	Columbus Township	
22	Newsom-Marr Farm	Newsom-Marr Farm	March 20, 2002 (#02000195)	4950 S. 150E, south of Columbus; 39°09′17″N 85°53′02″W	Sand Creek Township	
23	North Christian Church	North Christian Church	May 16, 2000 (#00000705)	850 Tipton Ln. 39°13′46″N 85°54′53″W	Columbus	
24	Pugh Ford Bridge	Pugh Ford Bridge	September 9, 1999 (#99001103)	County Road 900N over the Flatrock River, northeast of Taylorsville; 39°20′01″N 85°52′16″W	Flat Rock and German Townships	
25	The Republic	The Republic	October 16, 2012 (#12001015)	333 Second St. 39°12′00″N 85°55′18″W	Columbus	

== See also ==
- List of National Historic Landmarks in Indiana
- National Register of Historic Places listings in Indiana
- Listings in neighboring counties: Brown, Decatur, Jackson, Jennings, Johnson, Shelby
- List of Indiana state historical markers in Bartholomew County
