= Mary Chawner Woody =

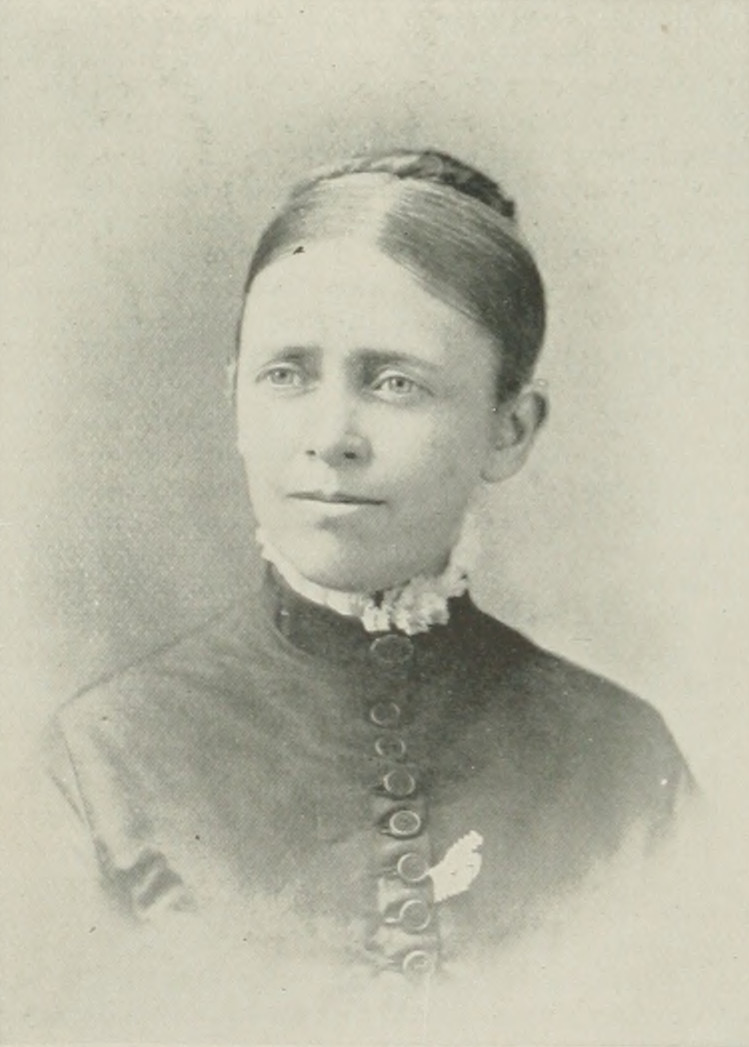
- Portrait from A Woman of the Century
- Title: President, North Carolina, Woman's Christian Temperance Union

Personal life
- Born: Mary Williams Chawner; December 22, 1846 Azalia, Indiana, U.S.
- Died: December 25, 1928 (aged 82) High Point, North Carolina, U.S.
- Resting place: New Garden Friends Cemetery, Guilford College
- Spouse: John Warren Woody (m. 1868)
- Children: 3
- Education: Albion College; Earlham College; University of Michigan

Religious life
- Religion: Quakers
- Profession: Minister; educator; temperance leader
- Ordination: 1884

Mary Chawner Woody (December 22, 1846 – December 25, 1928) was an American Quaker minister, educator, and temperance leader. For ten years, she served as president of the North Carolina branch of the Woman's Christian Temperance Union (W.C.T.U.), 1884–1894. She was also a Friends minister.

== Early life and education ==
Mary Williams Chawner was born in Azalia, Indiana, December 22, 1846. She was of English ancestry. Her parents were Chalkley Albertson Chawner and Sarah (Cox) Chawner. Her grandfather, John S. Chawner, was an English lawyer, who came to the U.S. early in the 19th century, and married and settled in eastern North Carolina. The other ancestors, for several generations, lived in that section. Among them were the Albertsons, Parkers and Coxes. Both families were Friends for generations. Woody's parents were very religious, and gave to their children the moral and religious training characteristic of the Friends in the era of her childhood. Woody was named after her father's favorite aunt, the wife of the Rev. John Williams, the missionary to the South Pacific. This aunt in her home took a deep interest in her namesake.

Woody was educated at Sand Creek and Sugar Plain Friends Monthly Meeting Schools (Indiana), supplemented by training in the Friends' Bloomingdale Academy (Bloomingdale, Indiana), at Albion College (Albion, Michigan), and in Earlham College (Richmond, Indiana), to which was added a year of studies in law and public speaking in University of Michigan (Ann Arbor, Michigan). In all those institutions, coeducation was the rule, and the principles of equality witnessed there gave shape to the pupils' sentiments.

== Career ==
She entered, as teacher, the Friends' Bloomingdale Academy where her brother, John Chawner, A.M., was principal.

In the spring of 1868, in Thorntown, Indiana, she married John Warren Woody, A.M., LL.B., of Alamance County, North Carolina. Together, they entered Whittier College (Salem, Iowa), as teachers. At the end of five years, Prof. Woody was elected the first president of Penn College, an institution of the Friends, in Oskaloosa, Iowa, and Mrs. Woody entered that institution as teacher. In 1881, they returned to North Carolina to labor in Guilford College. While Mr. Woody filled the position of professor of history and political science, Mrs. Woody's poor health and the care of her family, including three children (Herman, John Waldo, and Alice), prevented her from teaching. However, she found time for religious work in the Friends Church.

When the W.C.T.U. was organized in North Carolina, she entered its ranks. During the first year, she found time to organize several local Unions, and she accepted the Department of Scientific Instruction. At the second State convention, held in Asheville, North Carolina in October 1884, she was chosen president, a position to which she was elected to for several years thereafter. The requirements of this office were not easily met. The unsettled conditions of society, the novelty of cooperative women's enterprises, the questionings that existed everywhere about the best ways of doing temperance wor, combined to make it unusually difficult in this State, as well as all through the South. Her annual addresses before her State conventions were models. By reason of her State presidency, she simultaneously served as a vice-president of the National W.C.T.U.

At the time of her election to the W.C.T.U. presidency (1884), the church at home was completing its proceedings in setting her apart for the ministry. She became a minister of the Friends church in North Carolina. She served in this position in North Carolina, as well as in California, Indiana, Iowa, and Kansas. Woody was also active in evangelistic work.

Later teaching positions were held at Whittier College (Whittier, California) and Friends University (Wichita, Kansas).

== Death ==
Mary C. Woody died December 25, 1928, High Point, North Carolina. Interment was at New Garden Friends Cemetery, Guilford College.

== See also ==
- Mary Chawner
