= Indiana's 6th congressional district =

U.S. House district for Indiana

Coordinates: 40°N 85°W

- Interactive map of district boundaries since January 3, 2023
- Representative: Jefferson Shreve; R–Indianapolis
- Area: 5,550.4 mi^{2} (14,375 km^{2})
- Distribution: 59.23% urban; 40.77% rural
- Population (2025): 784,281
- Median household income: $81,594
- Ethnicity: 81.0% White; 5.3% Hispanic; 5.3% Asian; 4.0% Black; 3.9% Two or more races; 0.6% other
- Cook PVI: R+16

Indiana's 6th congressional district is a congressional district in the U.S. state of Indiana. The district takes in a portion of eastern and central Indiana as of the 2020 census, including Columbus and Richmond, some of Cincinnati's Indiana suburbs, most of Indianapolis's southern suburbs, and a sliver of Indianapolis itself.

The district is currently represented by Republican Jefferson Shreve, who was elected in 2024 after the retirement of Greg Pence, the brother of former U.S. Vice President Mike Pence, who represented this district before serving as Governor of Indiana and Vice President of the United States.

== Recent election results from statewide races ==
Year	Office	Results
2008	President	McCain 57% - 42%
2012	President	Romney 65% - 35%
2012	Senate	Mourdock 50% - 41%
2012	Governor	Pence 58% - 36%
2016	President	Trump 65% - 28%
2016	Senate	Young 60% - 33%
2016	Governor	Holcomb 59% - 37%
2016	Attorney General	Hill 72% - 28%
2018	Senate	Braun 60% - 36%
2020	President	Trump 65% - 33%
2020	Governor	Holcomb 60% - 24%
2020	Attorney General	Rokita 67% - 33%
2022	Senate	Young 64% - 31%
2022	Treasurer	Elliott 68% - 32%
2022	Auditor	Klutz 67% - 29%
2022	Secretary of State	Morales 57% - 34%
2024	President	Trump 65% - 33%
2024	Senate	Banks 65% - 31%
2024	Governor	Braun 60% - 35%
2024	Attorney General	Rokita 65% - 35%

== Composition ==
For the 118th and successive Congresses (based on redistricting following the 2020 census), the district contains all or portions of the following counties and townships:

Bartholomew County (9)

Clay, Clifty, Columbus, Flat Rock, German, Harrison, Haw Creek, Rock Creek, Sand Creek (part, also 9th; includes Elizabethtown)

Fayette County (9)

All nine townships

Hancock County (9)

All nine townships

Henry County (13)

All 13 townships

Johnson County (7)

All seven townships

Marion County (3)

Decatur, Franklin, Perry (part, also 7th; includes Homecroft, Southport, and part of Beech Grove and Indianapolis)

Randolph County (6)

Greensfork, Stoney Creek, Union, Washington, Wayne (part, also 3rd), White River (part, also 3rd)

Rush County (12)

All 12 townships

Shelby County (14)

All 14 townships

Union County (6)

All six townships

Wayne County (15)

All 15 townships

== List of members representing the district ==
Member	Party	Years	Cong ress	Electoral history
District created March 4, 1833
George L. Kinnard (Indianapolis)	Jacksonian	March 4, 1833 – November 26, 1836	23rd 24th	Elected in 1833. Re-elected in 1835. Died.
Vacant		November 26, 1836 – January 25, 1837	24th	
William Herod (Columbus)	Anti-Jacksonian	January 25, 1837 – March 3, 1837	24th 25th	Elected to finish Kinnard's term. Re-elected in 1837. Lost re-election.
William Herod (Columbus)	Whig	March 4, 1837 – March 3, 1839	24th 25th	Elected to finish Kinnard's term. Re-elected in 1837. Lost re-election.
William W. Wick (Indianapolis)	Democratic	March 4, 1839 – March 3, 1841	26th	Elected in 1839. Retired.
David Wallace (Indianapolis)	Whig	March 4, 1841 – March 3, 1843	27th	Elected in 1841. Redistricted to the 5th district and lost re-election.
John W. Davis (Carlisle)	Democratic	March 4, 1843 – March 3, 1847	28th 29th	Elected in 1843. Re-elected in 1845. Retired.
George G. Dunn (Bedford)	Whig	March 4, 1847 – March 3, 1849	30th	Elected in 1847. (Note: In 1847, Whig George G. Dunn defeated Democrat David M. Dobson by 1 vote, 7,455–7,454, in one of the closest elections in state history.); Retired.
Willis A. Gorman (Bloomington)	Democratic	March 4, 1849 – March 3, 1853	31st 32nd	Elected in 1849. Re-elected in 1851. Retired.
Thomas A. Hendricks (Shelbyville)	Democratic	March 4, 1853 – March 3, 1855	33rd	Redistricted from the 5th district and re-elected in 1852. Lost re-election.
Lucien Barbour (Indianapolis)	People's	March 4, 1855 – March 3, 1857	34th	Elected in 1854. Retired.
James M. Gregg (Danville)	Democratic	March 4, 1857 – March 3, 1859	35th	Elected in 1856. Retired.
Albert G. Porter (Indianapolis)	Republican	March 4, 1859 – March 3, 1863	36th 37th	Elected in 1858. Re-elected in 1860. Renominated but declined to run.
Ebenezer Dumont (Indianapolis)	Union	March 4, 1863 – March 3, 1865	38th 39th	Elected in 1862. Re-elected in 1864. Retired.
Ebenezer Dumont (Indianapolis)	Republican	March 4, 1865 – March 3, 1867	38th 39th	Elected in 1862. Re-elected in 1864. Retired.
John Coburn (Indianapolis)	Republican	March 4, 1867 – March 3, 1869	40th	Elected in 1866. Redistricted to the 5th district.
Daniel W. Voorhees (Terre Haute)	Democratic	March 4, 1869 – March 3, 1873	41st 42nd	Elected in 1868. Re-elected in 1870. Lost re-election.
Morton C. Hunter (Bloomington)	Republican	March 4, 1873 – March 3, 1875	43rd	Elected in 1872. Redistricted to the 8th district.
Milton S. Robinson (Anderson)	Republican	March 4, 1875 – March 3, 1879	44th 45th	Elected in 1874. Re-elected in 1876. Retired.
William R. Myers (Anderson)	Democratic	March 4, 1879 – March 3, 1881	46th	Elected in 1878. Redistricted to the 9th district and lost re-election to Orth.
Thomas M. Browne (Winchester)	Republican	March 4, 1881 – March 3, 1891	47th 48th 49th 50th 51st	Redistricted from the 5th district and re-elected in 1880. Re-elected in 1882. Re-elected in 1884. Re-elected in 1886. Re-elected in 1888. Retired.
Henry U. Johnson (Richmond)	Republican	March 4, 1891 – March 3, 1899	52nd 53rd 54th 55th	Elected in 1890. Re-elected in 1892. Re-elected in 1894. Re-elected in 1896. Retired.
James E. Watson (Rushville)	Republican	March 4, 1899 – March 3, 1909	56th 57th 58th 59th 60th	Elected in 1898. Re-elected in 1900. Re-elected in 1902. Re-elected in 1904. Re-elected in 1906. Retired to run for Governor of Indiana.
William O. Barnard (Newcastle)	Republican	March 4, 1909 – March 3, 1911	61st	Elected in 1908. Lost re-election.
Finly H. Gray (Connersville)	Democratic	March 4, 1911 – March 3, 1917	62nd 63rd 64th	Elected in 1910. Re-elected in 1912. Re-elected in 1914. Lost re-election.
Daniel W. Comstock (Richmond)	Republican	March 4, 1917 – May 19, 1917	65th	Elected in 1916. Died.
Vacant		May 19, 1917 – June 29, 1917	65th	
Richard N. Elliott (Connersville)	Republican	June 29, 1917 – March 3, 1931	65th 66th 67th 68th 69th 70th 71st	Elected to finish Comstock's term. Re-elected in 1918. Re-elected in 1920. Re-elected in 1922. Re-elected in 1924. Re-elected in 1926. Re-elected in 1928. Lost re-election.
William Larrabee (New Palestine)	Democratic	March 4, 1931 – March 3, 1933	72nd	Elected in 1930. Redistricted to the 11th district.
Virginia E. Jenckes (Terre Haute)	Democratic	March 4, 1933 – January 3, 1939	73rd 74th 75th	Elected in 1932. Re-elected in 1934. Re-elected in 1936. Lost re-election.
Noble J. Johnson (Terre Haute)	Republican	January 3, 1939 – July 1, 1948	76th 77th 78th 79th 80th	Elected in 1938. Re-elected in 1940. Re-elected in 1942. Re-elected in 1944. Re-elected in 1946. Resigned to become judge of the U.S. Court of Customs and Patent Appeals.
Vacant		July 1, 1948 – January 3, 1949	80th	
Cecil M. Harden (Covington)	Republican	January 3, 1949 – January 3, 1959	81st 82nd 83rd 84th 85th	Elected in 1948. Re-elected in 1950. Re-elected in 1952. Re-elected in 1954. Re-elected in 1956. Lost re-election.
Fred Wampler (Terre Haute)	Democratic	January 3, 1959 – January 3, 1961	86th	Elected in 1958. Lost re-election.
Richard L. Roudebush (Noblesville)	Republican	January 3, 1961 – January 3, 1967	87th 88th 89th	Elected in 1960. Re-elected in 1962. Re-elected in 1964. Redistricted to the 10th district.
William G. Bray (Martinsville)	Republican	January 3, 1967 – January 3, 1975	90th 91st 92nd 93rd	Redistricted from the 7th district and re-elected in 1966. Re-elected in 1968. Re-elected in 1970. Re-elected in 1972. Lost re-election.
David W. Evans (Indianapolis)	Democratic	January 3, 1975 – January 3, 1983	94th 95th 96th 97th	Elected in 1974. Re-elected in 1976. Re-elected in 1978. Re-elected in 1980. Redistricted to the 10th district and lost renomination.
Dan Burton (Indianapolis)	Republican	January 3, 1983 – January 3, 2003	98th 99th 100th 101st 102nd 103rd 104th 105th 106th 107th	Elected in 1982. Re-elected in 1984. Re-elected in 1986. Re-elected in 1988. Re-elected in 1990. Re-elected in 1992. Re-elected in 1994. Re-elected in 1996. Re-elected in 1998. Re-elected in 2000. Redistricted to the 5th district.
Mike Pence (Columbus)	Republican	January 3, 2003 – January 3, 2013	108th 109th 110th 111th 112th	Redistricted from the 2nd district and re-elected in 2002. Re-elected in 2004. Re-elected in 2006. Re-elected in 2008. Re-elected in 2010. Retired to run for Governor of Indiana.
Luke Messer (Greensburg)	Republican	January 3, 2013 – January 3, 2019	113th 114th 115th	Elected in 2012. Re-elected in 2014. Re-elected in 2016. Retired to run for U.S. Senator.
Greg Pence (Columbus)	Republican	January 3, 2019 – January 3, 2025	116th 117th 118th	Elected in 2018. Re-elected in 2020. Re-elected in 2022. Retired.
Jefferson Shreve (Indianapolis)	Republican	January 3, 2025– present	119th	Elected in 2024. Re-elected in 2026.

== Composition ==
#	County	Seat	Population
41	Fayette	Connersville	23,360
59	Hancock	Greenfield	81,789
65	Henry	New Castle	48,935
81	Johnson	Franklin	164,298
139	Rush	Rushville	16,672
145	Shelby	Shelbyville	45,039
161	Union	Liberty	7,047
177	Wayne	Richmond	66,456

As of 2023, Indiana's 6th congressional district is located in eastern and Central Indiana. It includes Fayette, Hancock, Henry, Johnson, Rush, Shelby, Union, and Wayne counties, and parts of Bartholomew, Marion, and Randolph counties.

Bartholomew County is split between this district and the 9th district. They are partitioned by the borders of Indiana County Rd West 300 South and Indiana County Rd 400 South. The 6th district takes in most of the city of Columbus, and the nine townships of Camp Atterbury, Clay, Clifty, Columbus Township, Flat Rock, German, Harrison, Haw Creek, and Rock Creek, and part of Sand Creek.

Marion County is split between this district and the 7th district. They are partitioned by Stafford Rd, West Troy Ave, and East Troy Ave. The 6th district takes in most of the city of Beech Grove as well as the south side of Indianapolis, encompassing Decatur, Perry, and Franklin Townships.

Several eastern and southern Indianapolis suburbs, including Greenwood, Franklin, and Greenfield, are also in the 6th district.

Randolph County is split between this district and the 3rd district. They are partitioned by Indiana State Rt 32. The 6th district takes in the four townships of Greensfork, Stoney Creek, Union, and Washington, as well as half of White River and Wayne townships.

=== Largest cities ===
Cities in the district with more than 10,000 residents as of the 2020 Census.

- Indianapolis (portion in 6th district) – 208,675
- Greenwood – 63,830
- Columbus – 50,474
- Richmond – 35,720
- Franklin – 25,313
- Greenfield – 23,488
- Shelbyville – 20,067
- New Castle – 17,396
- Beech Grove – 14,192
- Connersville – 13,481

== Election results ==
=== 2002 ===
Indiana's 6th Congressional District election (2002)
Party	Candidate	Votes	%
Republican	Mike Pence	118,436	63.79
Democratic	Melina Ann Fox	63,871	34.40
Libertarian	Doris Robertson	3,346	1.80
Total votes		185,653	100.00
Turnout			
Republican hold			

=== 2004 ===
Indiana's 6th Congressional District election (2004)
Party	Candidate	Votes	%
Republican	Mike Pence (incumbent)	182,529	67.09
Democratic	Melina Ann Fox	85,123	31.29
Libertarian	Chad (Wick) Roots	4,397	1.62
Total votes		272,049	100.00
Turnout			
Republican hold			

=== 2006 ===
Indiana's 6th Congressional District election (2006)
Party	Candidate	Votes	%
Republican	Mike Pence (incumbent)	115,266	60.01
Democratic	Barry A. Welsh	76,812	39.99
Total votes		192,078	100.00
Turnout			
Republican hold			

=== 2008 ===
Indiana's 6th Congressional District election (2008)
Party	Candidate	Votes	%
Republican	Mike Pence (incumbent)	180,549	63.96
Democratic	Barry A. Welsh	94,223	33.38
Libertarian	George T. Holland	7,534	2.67
Total votes		282,306	100.00
Turnout			
Republican hold			

=== 2010 ===
Indiana's 6th Congressional District election (2010)
Party	Candidate	Votes	%
Republican	Mike Pence (incumbent)	126,027	66.57
Democratic	Barry A. Welsh	56,647	29.92
Libertarian	Talmage "T.J." Thompson Jr.	6,635	3.51
Total votes		189,309	100.00
Turnout			41
Republican hold			

=== 2012 ===
Indiana's 6th Congressional District election (2012)
Party	Candidate	Votes	%
Republican	Luke Messer	162,613	59.08
Democratic	Brad Bookout	96,678	35.12
Libertarian	Rex Bell	15,962	5.80
Total votes		275,253	100.00
Turnout			57
Republican hold			

=== 2014 ===
Indiana's 6th Congressional District election (2014)
Party	Candidate	Votes	%
Republican	Luke Messer (incumbent)	102,187	65.90
Democratic	Susan Hall Heitzman	45,509	29.35
Libertarian	Eric Miller	7,375	4.76
Total votes		155,071	100.00
Turnout			32
Republican hold			

=== 2016 ===
Indiana's 6th Congressional District election (2016)
Party	Candidate	Votes	%
Republican	Luke Messer (incumbent)	204,920	69.14
Democratic	Barry A. Welsh	79,135	26.70
Libertarian	Rich Turvey	12,330	4.16
Total votes		296,385	100.00
Turnout			59
Republican hold			

=== 2018 ===
Indiana's 6th congressional district, 2018
Party	Candidate	Votes	%
Republican	Greg Pence	154,260	63.8
Democratic	Jeannine Lee Lake	79,430	32.9
Libertarian	Tom Ferkinhoff	8,030	3.3
Independent	John Miller (write-in)	5	0.0
Independent	Heather Leigh Meloy (write-in)	1	0.0
Total votes		241,726	100.0
Republican hold			

=== 2020 ===
Indiana's 6th congressional district, 2020
Party	Candidate	Votes	%
Republican	Greg Pence (incumbent)	225,318	68.6
Democratic	Jeannine Lee Lake	91,103	27.8
Libertarian	Tom Ferkinhoff	11,791	3.6
Total votes		328,212	100.0
Republican hold			

=== 2022 ===
Indiana's 6th congressional district, 2022
Party	Candidate	Votes	%
Republican	Greg Pence (incumbent)	130,686	67.5
Democratic	Cinde Wirth	62,838	32.5
Total votes		193,524	100.0
Republican hold			

=== 2024 ===
Indiana's 6th congressional district, 2024
Party	Candidate	Votes	%
Republican	Jefferson Shreve	201,357	63.9
Democratic	Cynthia Wirth	99,841	31.1
Libertarian	James Sceniak	13,711	4.4
Total votes		314,909	100.0
Republican hold			

== Historical district boundaries ==
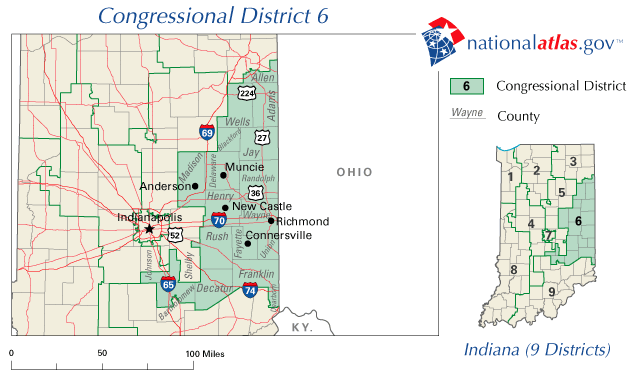
2003–2013

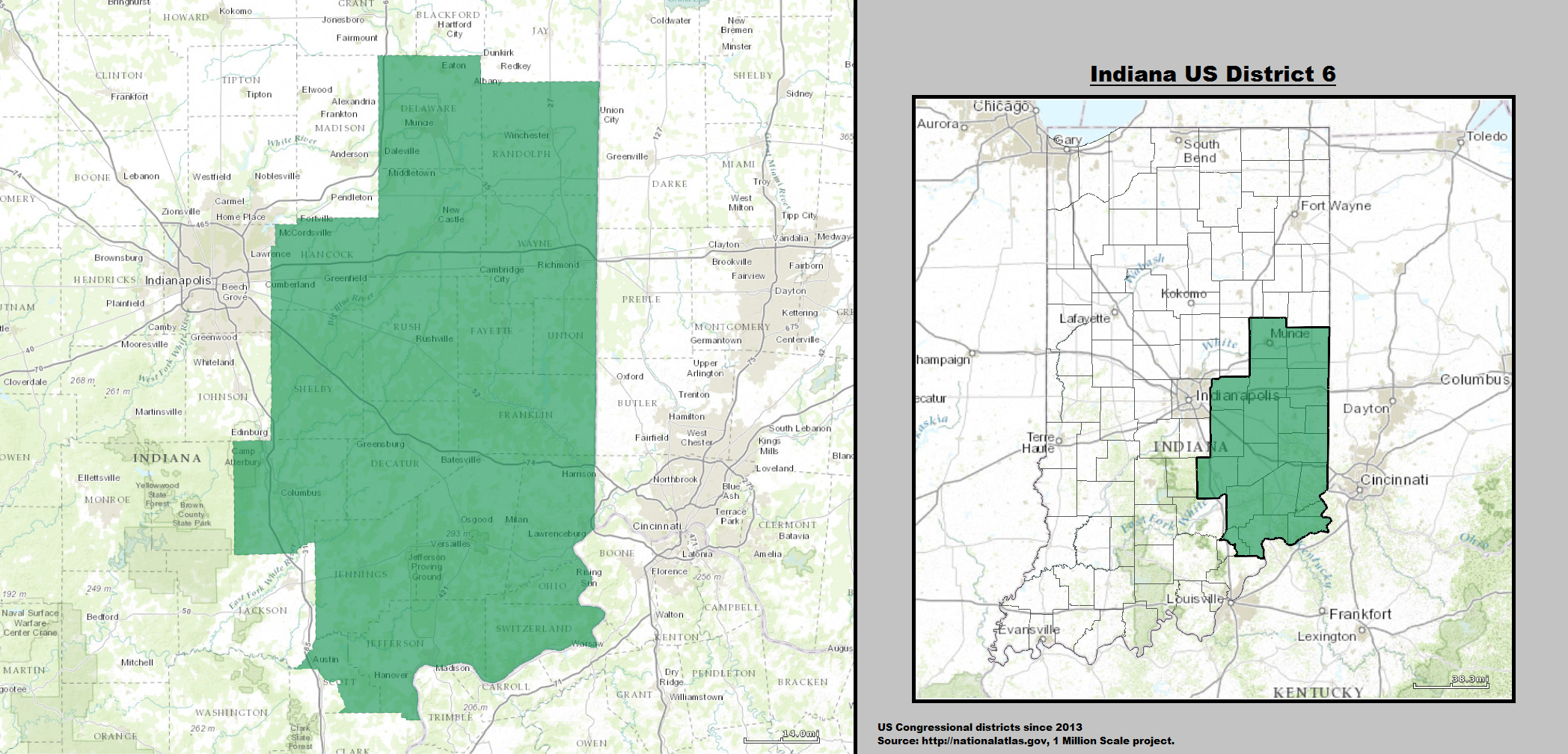
2013–2023

== See also ==
- Indiana's congressional districts
- List of United States congressional districts
