= Corn Brook =

Corn Brook may refer to:

- Corn Brook, Indiana
- Corn Brook, Manchester, watercourse in South Manchester and a tributary of the River Irwell
