= List of Indiana state historical markers in Bartholomew County =

Location of Bartholomew County in Indiana

This is a list of the Indiana state historical markers in Bartholomew County.

This is intended to be a complete list of the official state historical markers placed in Bartholomew County, Indiana, United States by the Indiana Historical Bureau. The locations of the historical markers and their latitude and longitude coordinates are included below when available, along with their names, years of placement, and topics as recorded by the Historical Bureau. There are 10 historical markers located in Bartholomew County.

== Historical markers ==
| Marker title | Image | Year placed | Location | Topics |
|---|---|---|---|---|
| Lowell Mills | | 1988 | Junction of County Road 325W and Driftwood Road at a Driftwood River public access site, west of Columbus and Interstate 65; 39°14′23″N 85°58′22″W | Business, Industry, and Labor, Historic District, Neighborhoods, and Towns |
| Private Barton W. Mitchell | | 1992 | Southwestern corner of the town square at the junction of State Road 46 (E. Harrison Street) and N. Washington Street in Hartsville; 39°16′4″N 85°41′56″W | Military |
| Hartsville College | | 1995 | Southeastern corner of the town square at the junction of State Road 46 (E. Harrison Street) and N. Jackson Street in Hartsville; 39°16′4″N 85°41′53″W | Education, Religion |
| Booker T. Washington School | | 1998 | Southeastern corner of the town square at the junction of State Road 46 (E. Harrison Street) and N. Jackson Street in Hartsville; 39°16′4″N 85°41′53.1″W | African American, Education |
| Second Baptist Church | | 1998 | 1328 9th Street at the Reed Street junction in Columbus; 39°12′29″N 85°54′35″W | African American, Religion |
| Madison and Indianapolis Railroad | | 1999 | 204 Railroad Road between 2nd and 3rd Streets on a grassy median in Elizabethtown; 39°8′8″N 85°48′46″W | Transportation, Business, Industry, and Labor |
| Bartholomew County Courthouse | | 2000 | Southeastern corner of the courthouse at 234 Washington Street in Columbus; 39°12′4″N 85°55′17″W | Government Institutions, Buildings and Architecture |
| Orinoco Furniture Company | | 2007 | 1720 17th Street in Columbus; 39°12′57″N 85°54′24″W | Business, Industry, and Labor |
| Atterbury Army Air Field | | 2007 | In front of the chapel at the junction of Middle Road and Grissom Avenue on Atterbury Army Air Field near Columbus; 39°15′43″N 85°53′47″W | Military |
| Cerealine Manufacturing Co. | | 2013 | Near 600 Jackson St., Columbus; 39°12′18″N 85°55′12″W | Business and Industry |

== See also ==
- List of Indiana state historical markers
- National Register of Historic Places listings in Bartholomew County, Indiana
