= Vida Newsom =

American clubwoman

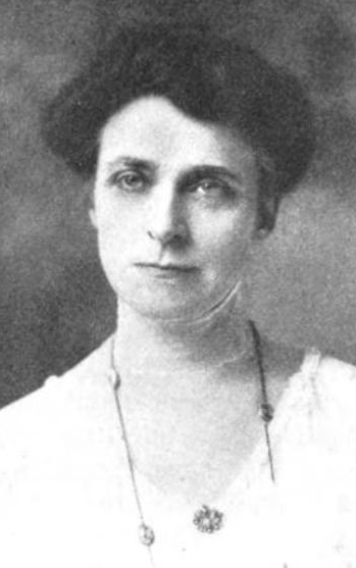
- Vida Newsom, from a 1919 publication
- Born: January 4, 1873; Sandcreek Township, Bartholomew County, Indiana
- Died: July 8, 1938 (aged 65); Columbus, Indiana, US
- Occupations: Suffragist, clubwoman

Vida Newsom (January 4, 1873 – July 8, 1938) was an American suffragist and clubwoman, based in Columbus, Indiana. She was described in a 1925 headline as "One of State's Busiest Women."

== Early life ==
Vida Newsom was born in Sandcreek Township, Indiana, one of the nine children of Jesse Ruddick Newsom and Mary Cox Newsom. The Newsom family were Quakers. She earned a bachelor's degree from Indiana University Bloomington in 1903, and a master's degree in 1906.

== Career ==
Newsom was active in the women's suffrage movement. She was president of the Columbus Franchise League from 1912 to 1920, and first vice-president of the State Legislative Council of Indiana Women, from 1915 to 1921. After suffrage was won, she became first president of the Columbus League of Women Voters, leading the new organization from 1920 to 1924. She also served in statewide and national offices for suffrage and voting rights. She was president of the Indiana Federation of Women's Clubs, and chaired various statewide committees in the federation, including fundraising, mental health, highways and memorial tree planting. During World War I, she chaired the county women's Liberty Loan committee.

Newsom took a particular interest in eugenics and mental health. She served as vice-president of the Indiana Society for Mental Hygiene, and was an advisor on mental health for the General Federation of Women's Clubs from 1926 to 1932. She was secretary of the Bartholomew County Board of Charities, and from 1922 to 1923 president of the State Conference of Charities and Corrections.

Newsom was also interested in historical commemoration and recreational spaces. She wrote a pageant for marking the Indiana state centennial in 1916, was one of the founders of the Bartholomew County Historical Society in 1921, and wrote articles about local history for the Indiana Magazine of History. She compiled a history of Bartholomew County's war effort in 1919. She was president of the Columbus Playground Association from 1911 to 1913, and was one of the leaders of the successful effort to create Turkey Run State Park. She served on a national commission on street and highway safety in 1924, appointed by Herbert Hoover.

== Personal life ==
Newsom died at home in 1938, aged 65 years, in Columbus. Her family's farm, the Newsom–Marr Farm, is a historic site in Bartholomew County.
