= Azalia, Indiana =

- Unincorporated community and Census-designated place
- Bartholomew County's location in Indiana

- Location in Bartholomew County
- Coordinates: 39°05′33″N 85°50′41″W
- Country: United States
- State: Indiana
- County: Bartholomew
- Township: Sand Creek
- Elevation: 594 ft (181 m)
- Time zone: UTC-5 (Eastern (EST))
  - Summer (DST): UTC-4 (EDT)
- ZIP code: 47232
- FIPS code: 18-03052
- GNIS feature ID: 2830308

Azalia is an unincorporated community in Sand Creek Township, Bartholomew County, in the U.S. state of Indiana.

== History ==
Officially platted on April 1, 1831, a post office was established at Azalia in 1833 and remained in operation until it was discontinued in 1934. It was named for the flowering shrub azalea.

== Demographics ==
Historical population
Census	Pop.	Note	%±
1860	120		—
1870	91		−24.2%
U.S. Decennial Census

Azalia last appeared in the U.S. Census as a separately-returned community in 1870, when it had a reported population of 91 residents.

The United States Census Bureau delineated Azalia as a census designated place in the 2022 American Community Survey.

== Notable people ==
- Mary Chawner Woody (1846–1928), philanthropist and educator
