= Elnora Daugherty Farm =

- U.S. National Register of Historic Places
- U.S. Historic district
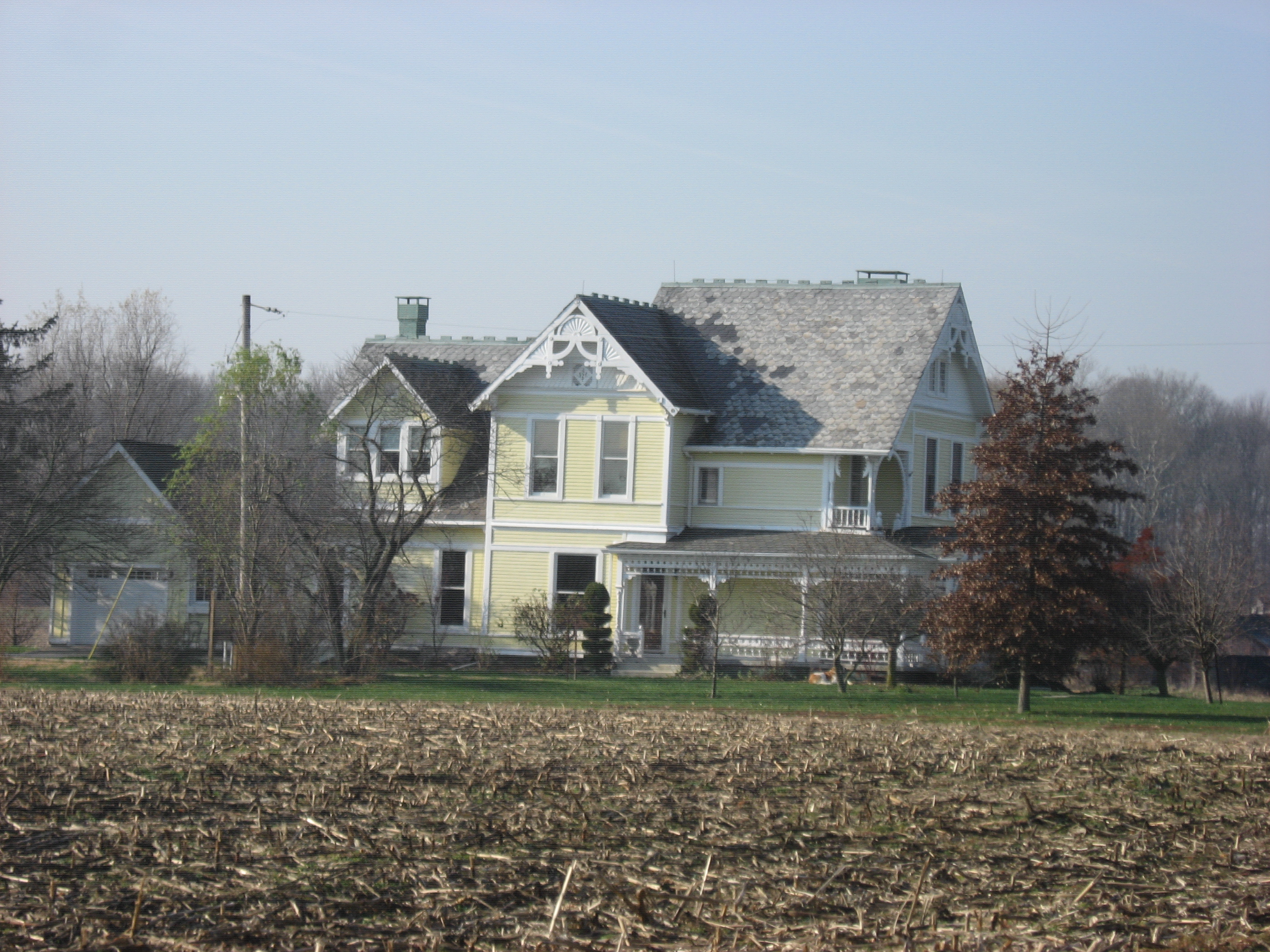
- Elnora Daugherty Farmhouse, December 2011

- Location within Bartholomew County, Indiana Location within Indiana Location within the United States
- Location: 5541 E. 500S, south of Columbus, Sand Creek Township, Bartholomew County, Indiana
- Coordinates: 39°07′39″N 85°51′43″W
- Area: 9.5 acres (3.8 ha)
- Built: 1892
- Architectural style: Queen Anne, Transverse-frame barn
- NRHP reference No.: 92000676
- Added to NRHP: June 4, 1992

Elnora Daugherty Farm is a historic home and farm and national historic district located at Sand Creek Township, Bartholomew County, Indiana. It encompasses six contributing buildings, one contributing site (a gasoline pump) and one contributing object (a row of Silver Maple trees). The house was built in 1892, and is a 2 1/2-story, Queen Anne-style frame dwelling. Also on the property are the contributing traverse-frame barn (c. 1890), wagon shed (c. 1900), utility building (c. 1920), and storage shed (c. 1920).

It was listed on the National Register of Historic Places in 1992.

== See also ==
- National Register of Historic Places listings in Bartholomew County, Indiana
