= D. W. Heagy Farm =

- U.S. National Register of Historic Places
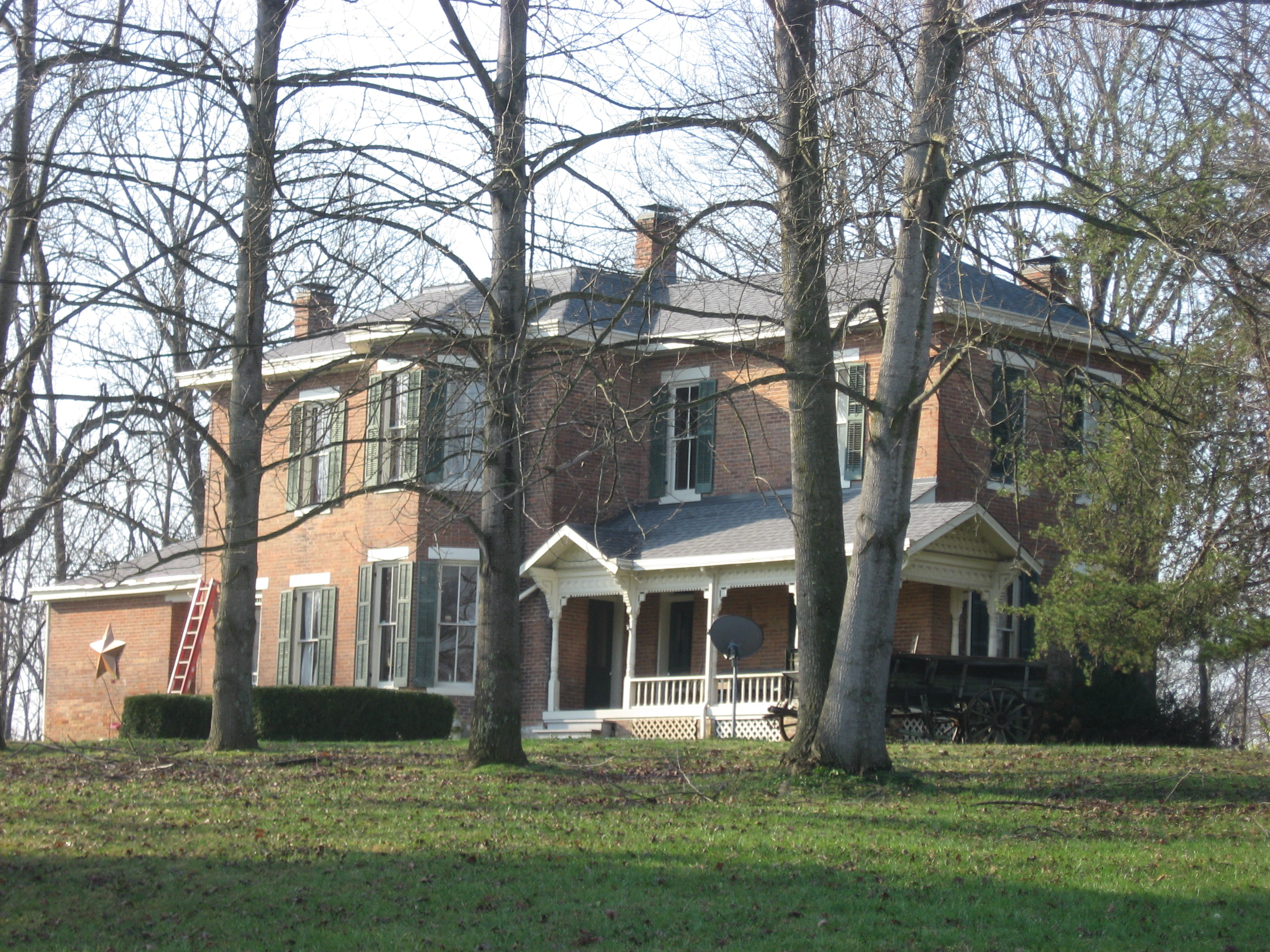
- D. W. Heagy Farmhouse, December 2011

- Location within Bartholomew County, Indiana Location within Indiana Location within the United States
- Location: 3005 W. 200S, southwest of Columbus, Columbus Township, Bartholomew County, Indiana
- Coordinates: 39°10′14″N 85°57′23″W
- Area: 7 acres (2.8 ha)
- Built: 1879
- Architectural style: Italianate, Cross-plan
- NRHP reference No.: 98001052
- Added to NRHP: August 14, 1998

D. W. Heagy Farm, also known as Pine Grove Farm, is a historic home and farm located at Columbus Township, Bartholomew County, Indiana. The house was built in 1879, and is a two-story, Italianate style cross-plan brick dwelling with an attached summer kitchen. It has a hipped roof and sits on a fieldstone foundation. Also on the property are the contributing milk house, small shed, wagon shed, frame German bank barn (1912), silo, pump, and trough (1930).

It was listed on the National Register of Historic Places in 1998.

== See also ==
- National Register of Historic Places listings in Bartholomew County, Indiana
