= New Hope Bridge =

- U.S. National Register of Historic Places
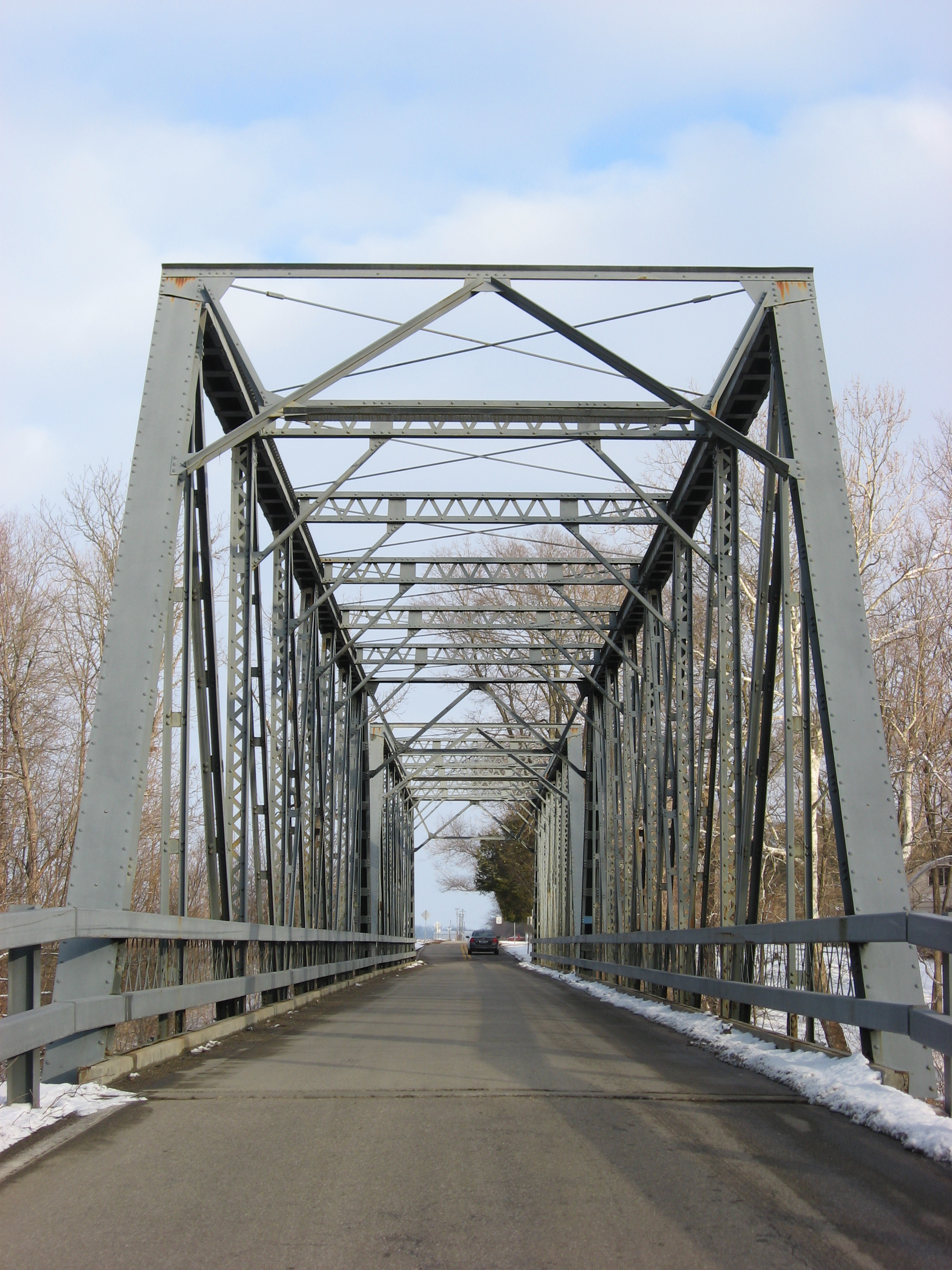
- New Hope Bridge western portal, January 2011

- Location within Bartholomew County, Indiana Location within Indiana Location within the United States
- Location: County Road 400N over the Flatrock River, north of Columbus, Columbus Township, Bartholomew County, Indiana
- Coordinates: 39°15′34″N 85°55′19″W
- Area: less than one acre
- Built: 1913
- Architect: Caldwell & Drake
- Architectural style: Pratt through truss
- NRHP reference No.: 99001104
- Added to NRHP: September 9, 1999

New Hope Bridge, also known as Bartholomew County Bridge No. 133, is a historic Pratt through truss bridge spanning the Flatrock River at Columbus Township, Bartholomew County, Indiana. It was designed by the Caldwell & Drake ironworks and built in 1913. It consists of two spans, with each measuring 128 feet long. It rests on concrete abutments and a concrete pier.

The bridge is open to single-lane traffic along 400N in Bartholomew County which spans from U.S. Route 31 just north of Columbus, Indiana to Columbus Municipal Airport, the former site of Bakalar Air Force Base. Because portions of 400N are low-lying the road and bridge are occasionally closed due to high water from the Flat Rock River.

New Hope Bridge was listed on the National Register of Historic Places in 1999.

== See also ==
- National Register of Historic Places listings in Bartholomew County, Indiana
