= McEwen-Samuels-Marr House =

Historic house in Indiana, United States

- U.S. National Register of Historic Places
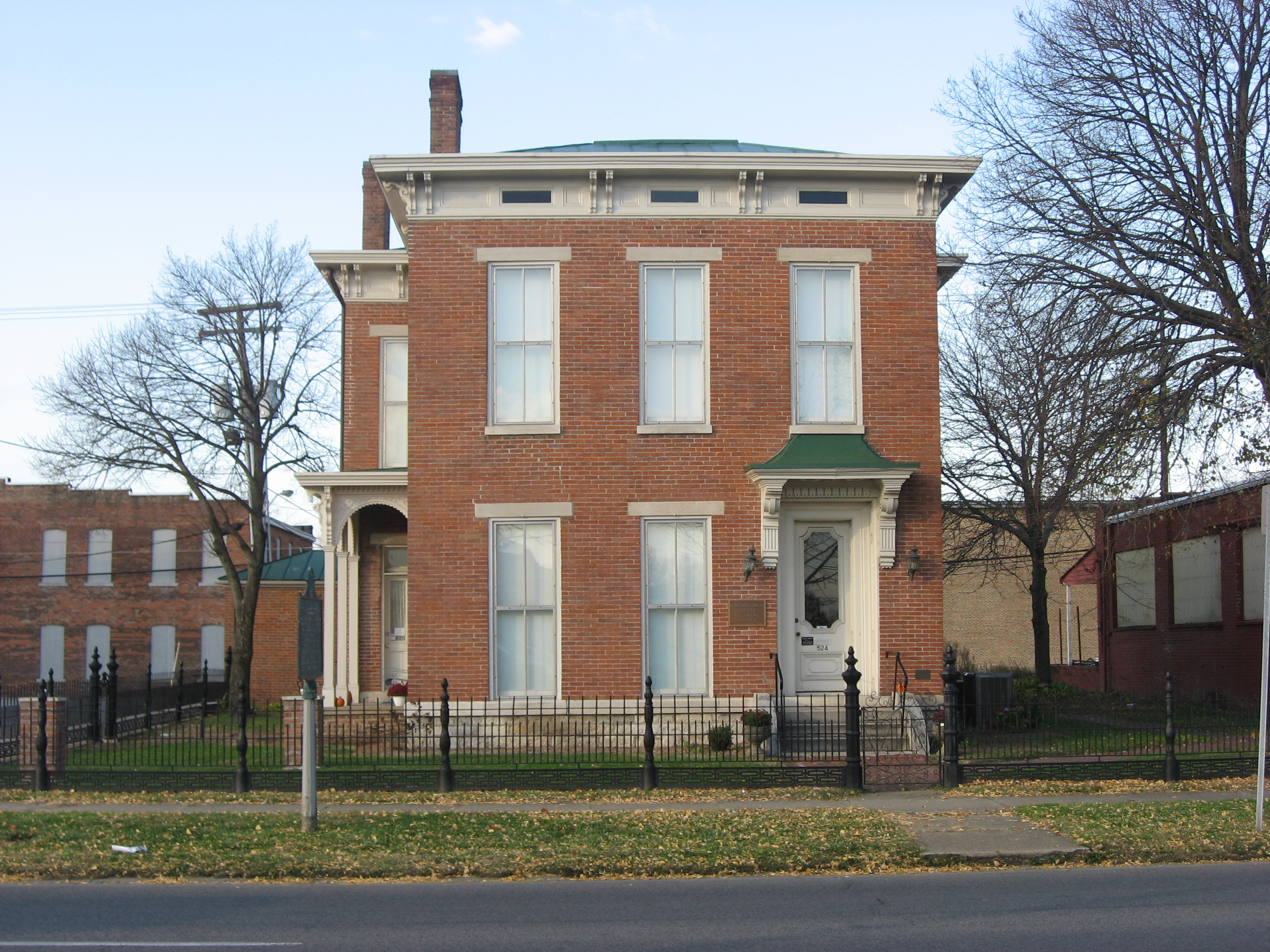
- McEwen-Samuels-Marr House, November 2009

- Location within Bartholomew County, Indiana Location within Indiana Location within the United States
- Location: 524 3rd St., Columbus, Indiana
- Coordinates: 39°12′6″N 85°55′8″W
- Area: less than one acre
- Built: 1864, 1875
- Architectural style: Italianate
- NRHP reference No.: 78000045
- Added to NRHP: May 22, 1978

McEwen-Samuels-Marr House is a historic home located at Columbus, Indiana. The rear section was built in 1864, and the front section in 1875. It is a two-story, Italianate style brick dwelling. It has a stone foundation, four brick chimneys, and a hipped roof. The building has housed the Bartholomew County Historical Museum since the 1970s.

It was added to the National Register of Historic Places in 1977.

== See also ==
- National Register of Historic Places listings in Bartholomew County, Indiana
