= James Marr Farm =

- James Marr House and Farm
- U.S. National Register of Historic Places
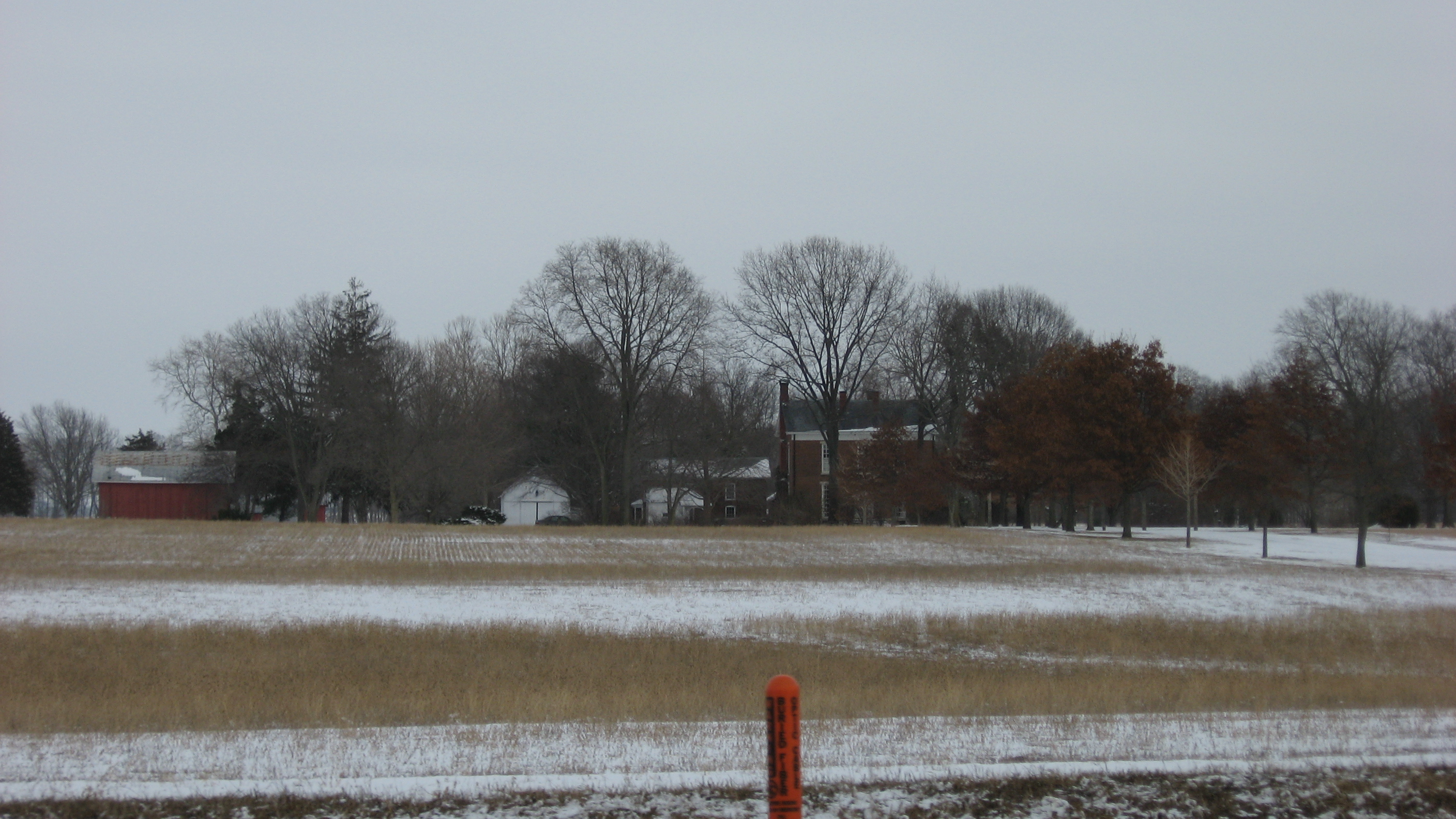
- James Marr Farm, January 2011

- Location within Bartholomew County, Indiana Location within Indiana Location within the United States
- Location: Northeast of Columbus on Marr Rd., Columbus Township, Flat Rock Township, and German Township, Bartholomew County, Indiana
- Coordinates: 39°15′22″N 85°52′50″W
- Area: 8 acres (3.2 ha)
- Built: 1871
- Built by: Marr, James
- NRHP reference No.: 80000052
- Added to NRHP: October 23, 1980

James Marr House and Farm is a historic home and farm located at Columbus Township, Flat Rock Township, and German Township, Bartholomew County, Indiana. The house was built in 1871, and is a two-story, three-bay, brick dwelling with a two-story, rear ell. It sits on a stone foundation and has a gable roof. Also on the property are the contributing brick smoke house, wash / wood house, milk house, garage, shed, small barn, large barn, chicken house, and late-19th century tenant house.

It was listed on the National Register of Historic Places in 1980.

== See also ==
- National Register of Historic Places listings in Bartholomew County, Indiana
