= David Aikens House =

Historic house in Indiana, United States

- U.S. National Register of Historic Places
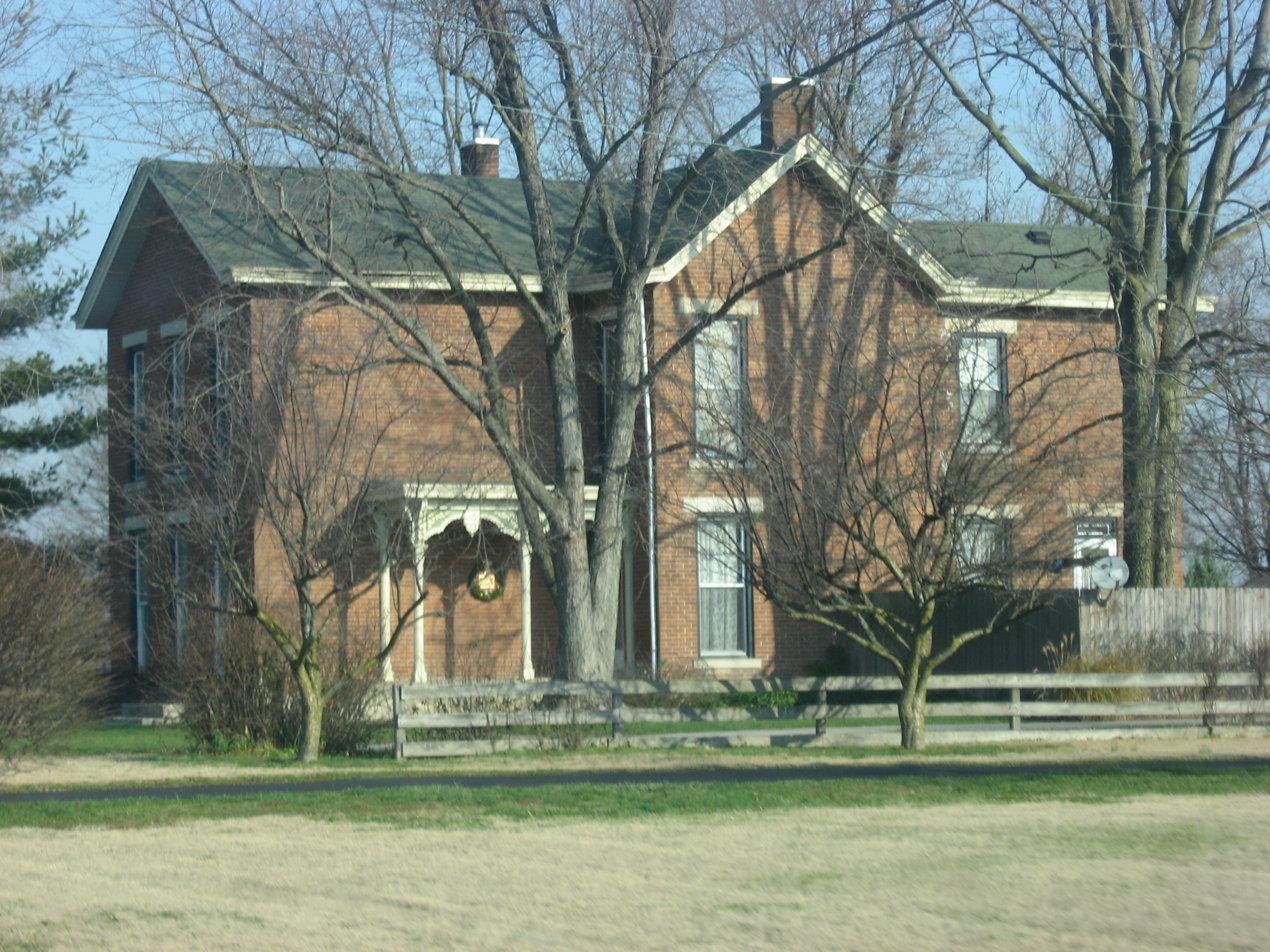
- David Aikens Farmhouse, December 2011

- Location within Bartholomew County, Indiana Location within Indiana Location within the United States
- Location: 2325 Jonesville Rd., southwest of Columbus, Columbus Township, Bartholomew County, Indiana
- Coordinates: 39°10′27″N 85°55′48″W
- Area: 2.3 acres (0.93 ha)
- Built: 1877
- Built by: Keller and Brockman
- Architectural style: Italianate, Nailed Frame Barn
- NRHP reference No.: 01000621
- Added to NRHP: June 6, 2001

David Aikens House, also known as the Old Manse, is a historic home located at Columbus Township, Bartholomew County, Indiana. The house was built in 1877, and is a two-story, Italianate style cross-plan brick dwelling with a two-story, rear kitchen wing. It has a gable roof and sits on a limestone foundation. Also on the property is the contributing Nailed Frame Barn (c. 1905).

It was listed on the National Register of Historic Places in 2001.

== See also ==
- National Register of Historic Places listings in Bartholomew County, Indiana
