= Saint Louis Crossing, Indiana =

Saint Louis Crossing
- Unincorporated town
- Bartholomew County's location in Indiana

- Location in Bartholomew County
- Coordinates: 39°19′08″N 85°50′48″W
- Country: United States
- State: Indiana
- County: Bartholomew
- Township: Flat Rock
- Elevation: 682 ft (208 m)
- Time zone: UTC-5 (Eastern (EST))
  - Summer (DST): UTC-4 (EDT)
- ZIP code: 47246
- FIPS code: 18-66996
- GNIS feature ID: 442661

Saint Louis Crossing is an unincorporated town in Flat Rock Township, Bartholomew County, in the U.S. state of Indiana.

== History ==
The town was laid out at crossing on the Columbus & Shelbyville Railroad outside of Old Saint Louis, hence the name. A post office was established in 1862, and was discontinued in 1974.
