= Clifford, Indiana =

- Town
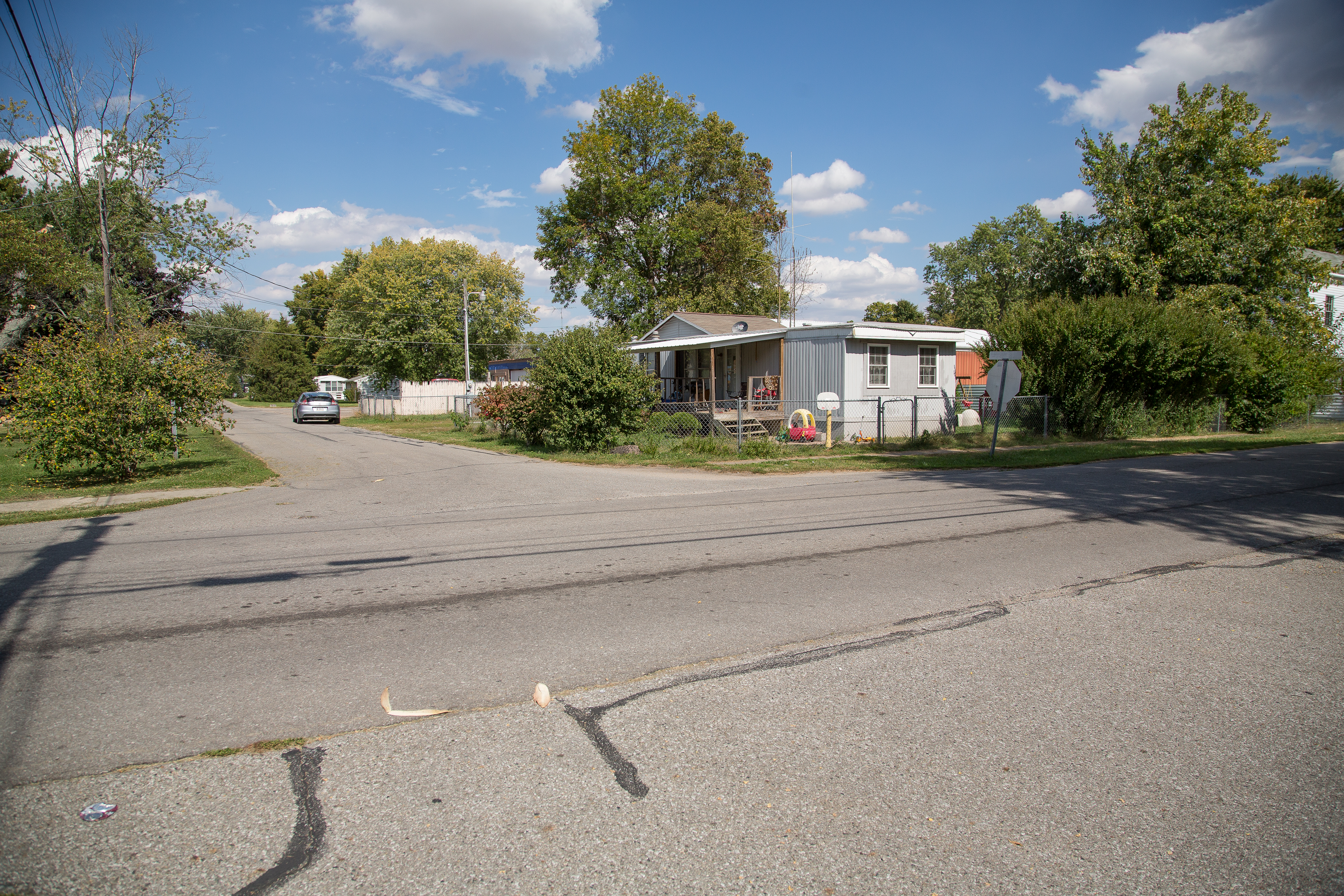

- Location of Clifford in Bartholomew County, Indiana.
- Coordinates: 39°16′58″N 85°52′09″W
- Country: United States
- State: Indiana
- County: Bartholomew
- Township: Flat Rock
- Established: 1853
- Incorporated: 1883

Area
  - Total: 0.089 sq mi (0.23 km^{2})
  - Land: 0.089 sq mi (0.23 km^{2})
  - Water: 0 sq mi (0.00 km^{2})
- Elevation: 663 ft (202 m)

Population (2020)
  - Total: 205
  - Density: 2,318.7/sq mi (895.26/km^{2})
- Time zone: UTC−5 (EST)
  - Summer (DST): UTC−5 (EST)
- ZIP code: 47226
- Area code: 812
- FIPS code: 18-13582
- GNIS feature ID: 2396655

Clifford is a town in Flat Rock Township, Bartholomew County, Indiana, United States. The population was 205 at the 2020 census. It is part of the Columbus, Indiana metropolitan statistical area.

== History ==
Clifford was founded in 1853 (173 years ago). The first post office at Clifford was also established in 1853.

In April 1883, Clifford was officially incorporated as a town, thirty years after it was originally established.

== Geography ==
According to the 2010 census, Clifford has a total area of 0.11 square miles (0.28 km^{2}), all land.

== Demographics ==
Historical population
Census	Pop.	Note	%±
1880	134		—
1890	175		30.6%
1900	233		33.1%
1910	210		−9.9%
1920	185		−11.9%
1930	179		−3.2%
1940	188		5.0%
1950	232		23.4%
1960	241		3.9%
1970	275		14.1%
1980	310		12.7%
1990	308		−0.6%
2000	291		−5.5%
2010	233		−19.9%
2020	205		−12.0%
U.S. Decennial Census

=== 2010 census ===
As of the census of 2010, there were 233 people, 94 households, and 62 families living in the town. The population density was 2,118.2 inhabitants per square mile (817.8/km^{2}). There were 114 housing units at an average density of 1,036.4 per square mile (400.2/km^{2}). The racial makeup of the town was 99.1% White, 0.4% Native American, and 0.4% from other races. Hispanic or Latino of any race were 1.7% of the population.

There were 94 households, of which 41.5% had children under the age of 18 living with them, 44.7% were married couples living together, 14.9% had a female householder with no husband present, 6.4% had a male householder with no wife present, and 34.0% were non-families. 27.7% of all households were made up of individuals, and 12.7% had someone living alone who was 65 years of age or older. The average household size was 2.48 and the average family size was 3.00.

The median age in the town was 35.6 years. 30.5% of residents were under the age of 18; 3.9% were between the ages of 18 and 24; 30.9% were from 25 to 44; 24.5% were from 45 to 64; and 10.3% were 65 years of age or older. The gender makeup of the town was 54.5% male and 45.5% female.

=== 2000 census ===
As of the census of 2000, there were 291 people, 109 households, and 78 families living in the town. The population density was 2,899.4 inhabitants per square mile (1,119.5/km^{2}). There were 116 housing units at an average density of 1,155.8 per square mile (446.3/km^{2}). The racial makeup of the town was 95.53% White, 1.72% from other races, and 2.75% from two or more races. Hispanic or Latino of any race were 1.37% of the population.

There were 109 households, out of which 41.3% had children under the age of 18 living with them, 53.2% were married couples living together, 12.8% had a female householder with no husband present, and 28.4% were non-families. 24.8% of all households were made up of individuals, and 9.2% had someone living alone who was 65 years of age or older. The average household size was 2.67 and the average family size was 3.15.

In the town, the population was spread out, with 32.0% under the age of 18, 11.0% from 18 to 24, 33.3% from 25 to 44, 16.5% from 45 to 64, and 7.2% who were 65 years of age or older. The median age was 29 years. For every 100 females, there were 110.9 males. For every 100 females age 18 and over, there were 102.0 males.

The median income for a household in the town was $25,000, and the median income for a family was $37,917. Males had a median income of $27,679 versus $23,750 for females. The per capita income for the town was $13,132. About 9.2% of families and 15.1% of the population were below the poverty line, including 21.8% of those under the age of eighteen and 24.2% of those 65 or over.
