= Nortonburg, Indiana =

- Unincorporated community
- Bartholomew County's location in Indiana

- Location in Bartholomew County
- Coordinates: 39°16′06″N 85°49′24″W
- Country: United States
- State: Indiana
- County: Bartholomew
- Township: Flat Rock
- Elevation: 692 ft (211 m)
- Time zone: UTC-5 (Eastern (EST))
  - Summer (DST): UTC-4 (EDT)
- ZIP code: 47246
- FIPS code: 18-55332
- GNIS feature ID: 449703

Nortonburg is an unincorporated community in Flat Rock Township, Bartholomew County, in the U.S. state of Indiana.

== History ==
A post office was established at Nortonburg (but spelled Nortonburgh) in 1886, and remained in operation until it was discontinued in 1912. It was named in honor of the Norton family of settlers.
