= William R. Gant Farm =

- U.S. National Register of Historic Places
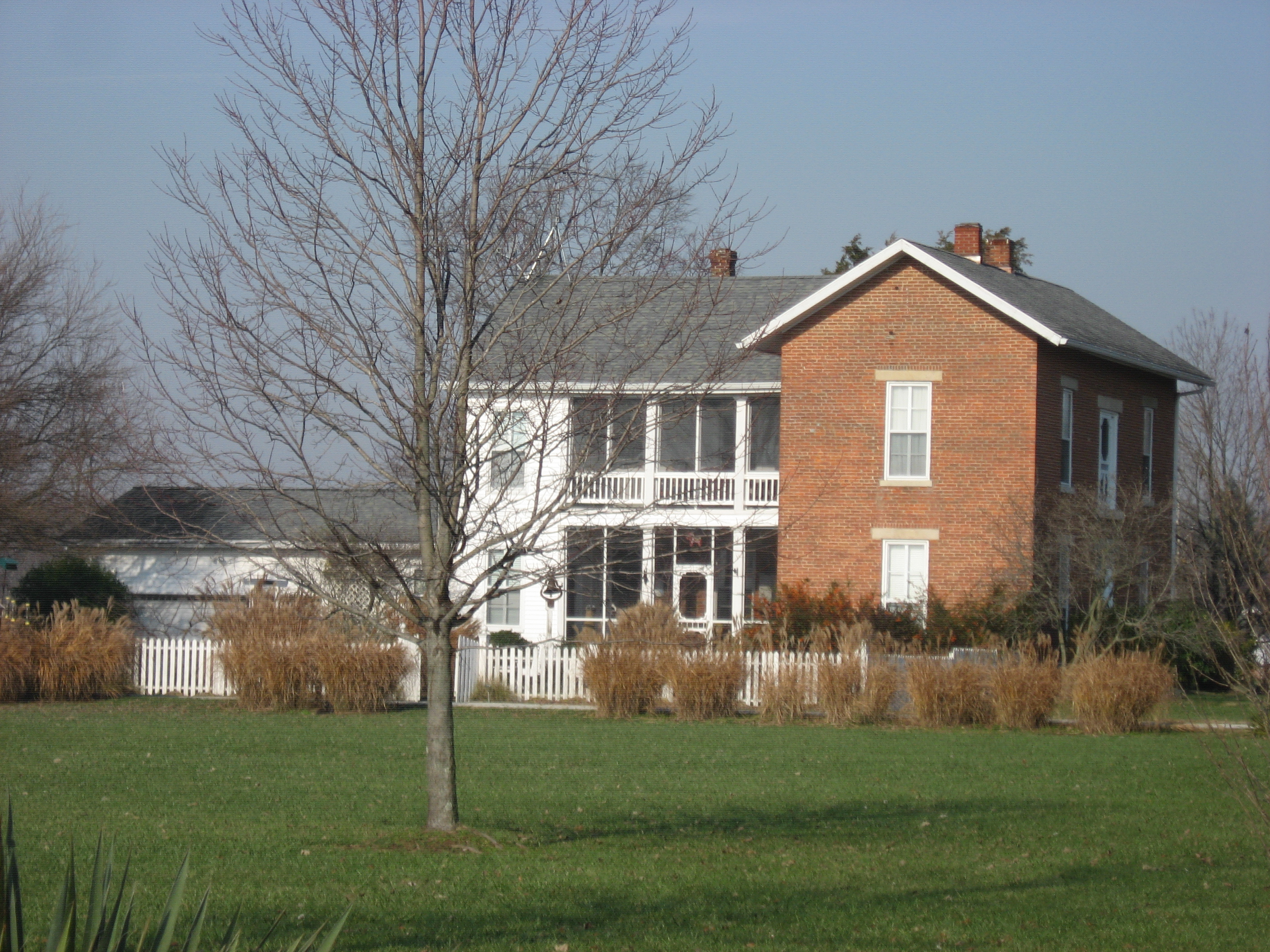
- William R. Gant Farmhouse, December 2011

- Location within Bartholomew County, Indiana Location within Indiana Location within the United States
- Location: 5890 S175E, south of Columbus, Sand Creek Township, Bartholomew County, Indiana
- Coordinates: 39°08′48″N 85°52′47″W
- Area: 3 acres (1.2 ha)
- Built: 1864
- Architectural style: Greek Revival, Transverse frame barn
- NRHP reference No.: 00001134
- Added to NRHP: September 22, 2000

William R. Gant Farm is a historic home and farm located at Sand Creek Township, Bartholomew County, Indiana. The house was built about 1864, and is a two-story, vernacular Greek Revival style brick dwelling with a Federal style rear ell. Also on the property is a contributing traverse-frame barn dated to the early-20th century.

It was listed on the National Register of Historic Places in 2000.

== See also ==
- National Register of Historic Places listings in Bartholomew County, Indiana
