= Haw Creek Leather Company =

- U.S. National Register of Historic Places
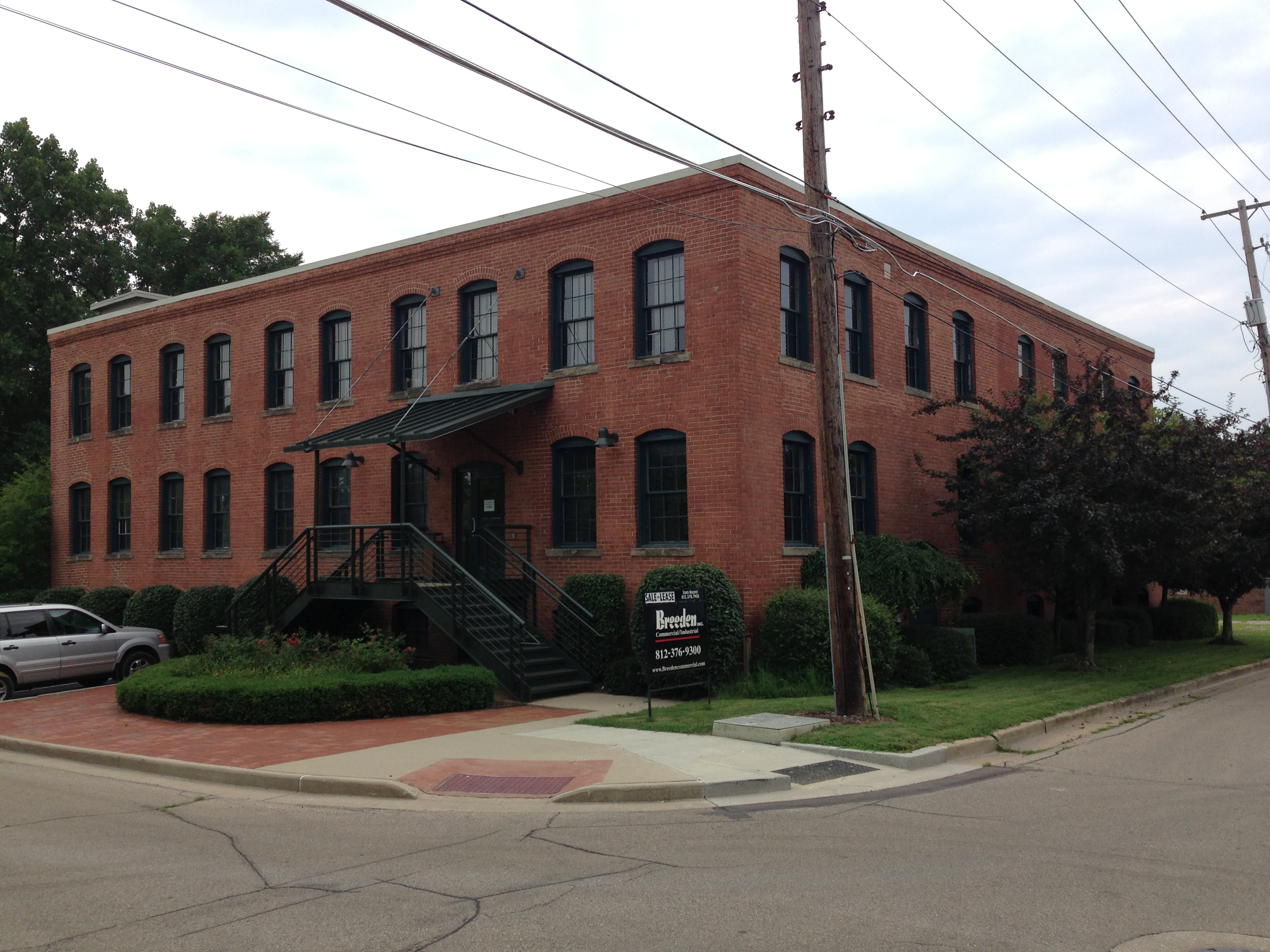
- Haw Creek Leather Company, July 2013

- Location within Bartholomew County, Indiana Location within Indiana Location within the United States
- Location: Jct. of Washington and First Sts., Columbus, Indiana
- Coordinates: 39°11′57″N 85°55′17″W
- Area: less than one acre
- Built: 1914, 1916
- Architectural style: Late 19th And Early 20th Century American Movements
- NRHP reference No.: 98001526
- Added to NRHP: December 17, 1998

Haw Creek Leather Company is a historic factory building in Columbus, Indiana. It was built between 1914 and 1916, and is a two-story, brick industrial building. It sits on a raised basement and has a flat roof. It features arched window openings. The Haw Creek Leather Company operated a tannery at this location until 1955.

It was added to the National Register of Historic Places in 1998.

== See also ==
- National Register of Historic Places listings in Bartholomew County, Indiana
