= Garden City, Indiana =

- Unincorporated community
- Bartholomew County's location in Indiana

- Location in Bartholomew County
- Coordinates: 39°11′00″N 85°56′00″W
- Country: United States
- State: Indiana
- County: Bartholomew
- Township: Columbus
- Elevation: 617 ft (188 m)
- Time zone: UTC-5 (Eastern (EST))
  - Summer (DST): UTC-4 (EDT)
- ZIP code: 47201
- FIPS code: 18-26332
- GNIS feature ID: 434943

Garden City is an unincorporated community in Columbus Township, Bartholomew County, in the U.S. state of Indiana.

== History ==
Garden City was founded in 1886.
