= Taylorsville, Indiana =

- CDP
- Location of Taylorsville in Bartholomew County, Indiana.
- Coordinates: 39°17′47″N 85°56′57″W
- Country: United States
- State: Indiana
- County: Bartholomew
- Township: German
- Platted: 1849

Area
  - Total: 1.07 sq mi (2.76 km^{2})
  - Land: 1.07 sq mi (2.76 km^{2})
  - Water: 0 sq mi (0.00 km^{2})
- Elevation: 653 ft (199 m)

Population (2020)
  - Total: 867
  - Density: 814.7/sq mi (314.54/km^{2})
- Time zone: UTC-5 (Eastern (EST))
  - Summer (DST): UTC-4 (EDT)
- ZIP code: 47280
- Area code: 812
- FIPS code: 18-75104
- GNIS feature ID: 444607

Taylorsville is a census-designated place (CDP) in German Township, Bartholomew County, in the U.S. state of Indiana. The population was 867 at the 2020 census. It is part of the Columbus, Indiana metropolitan statistical area.

== History ==
Taylorsville was originally called Herod, and under the latter name was platted in 1849. The post office at Taylorsville has been in operation since 1852.

== Geography ==
Taylorsville is located at 39°17′47″N 85°56′57″W (39.296284, -85.949220).

According to the United States Census Bureau, the CDP has a total area of 1.0 square mile (2.6 km^{2}), all land.

== Demographics ==
Historical population
Census	Pop.	Note	%±
1860	320		—
1870	350		9.4%
1980	1,247		—
1990	1,044		−16.3%
2000	936		−10.3%
2010	919		−1.8%
2020	867		−5.7%
U.S. Decennial Census

As of the census of 2000, there were 936 people, 356 households and 280 families residing in the CDP. The population density was 895.5 inhabitants per square mile (345.8/km^{2}). There were 375 housing units at an average density of 358.8 per square mile (138.5/km^{2}). The racial makeup of the CDP was 96.69% White, 1.82% African American, 0.11% Pacific Islander, 0.53% from other races, and 0.85% from two or more races. Hispanic or Latino of any race were 1.28% of the population.

There were 356 households, out of which 33.1% had children under the age of 18 living with them, 65.2% were married couples living together, 10.1% had a female householder with no husband present, and 21.3% were non-families. 19.7% of all households were made up of individuals, and 7.0% had someone living alone who was 65 years of age or older. The average household size was 2.63 and the average family size was 3.00.

In the CDP, the population was spread out, with 25.3% under the age of 18, 9.6% from 18 to 24, 27.1% from 25 to 44, 26.8% from 45 to 64, and 11.1% who were 65 years of age or older. The median age was 37 years. For every 100 females, there were 97.9 males. For every 100 females age 18 and over, there were 96.9 males.

The median income for a household in the CDP was $36,923, and the median income for a family was $45,000. Males had a median income of $38,207 versus $21,467 for females. The per capita income for the CDP was $15,566. About 7.2% of families and 9.2% of the population were below the poverty line, including 12.2% of those under age 18 and none of those age 65 or over.
