= Pugh Ford Bridge =

- U.S. National Register of Historic Places
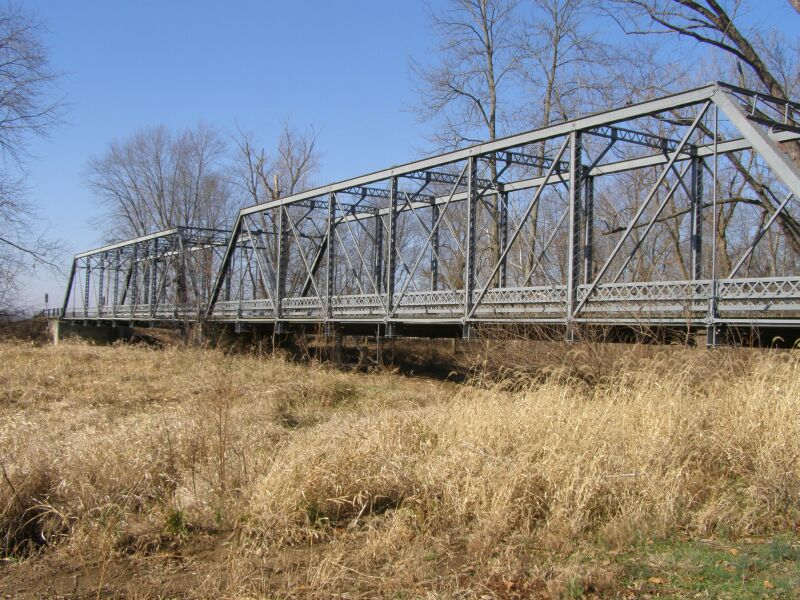
- Pugh Ford Bridge Truss Bridge, December 2010

- Location within Bartholomew County, Indiana Location within Indiana Location within the United States
- Location: Cty. Rd. 900 N over Flat Rock River, northeast of Taylorsville, Flat Rock Township and German Township, Bartholomew County, Indiana
- Coordinates: 39°20′01″N 85°51′51″W
- Area: less than one acre
- Built: 1911
- Built by: Rights, William H.; Elkhart Bridge and Iron Co.
- Architectural style: Pratt through truss
- NRHP reference No.: 99001103
- Added to NRHP: September 9, 1999

Pugh Ford Bridge, also known as Bartholomew County Bridge No. 73, is a historic Pratt through truss bridge spanning the Flatrock River at Flat Rock Township and German Township, Bartholomew County, Indiana. It was built by the Elkhart Bridge and Iron Co. and built in 1911. The bridge consists of two spans, with each measuring 128 feet long. It rests on concrete abutments and a concrete pier.

It was listed on the National Register of Historic Places in 1999.

== See also ==
- National Register of Historic Places listings in Bartholomew County, Indiana
