= Newsom–Marr Farm =

- U.S. National Register of Historic Places
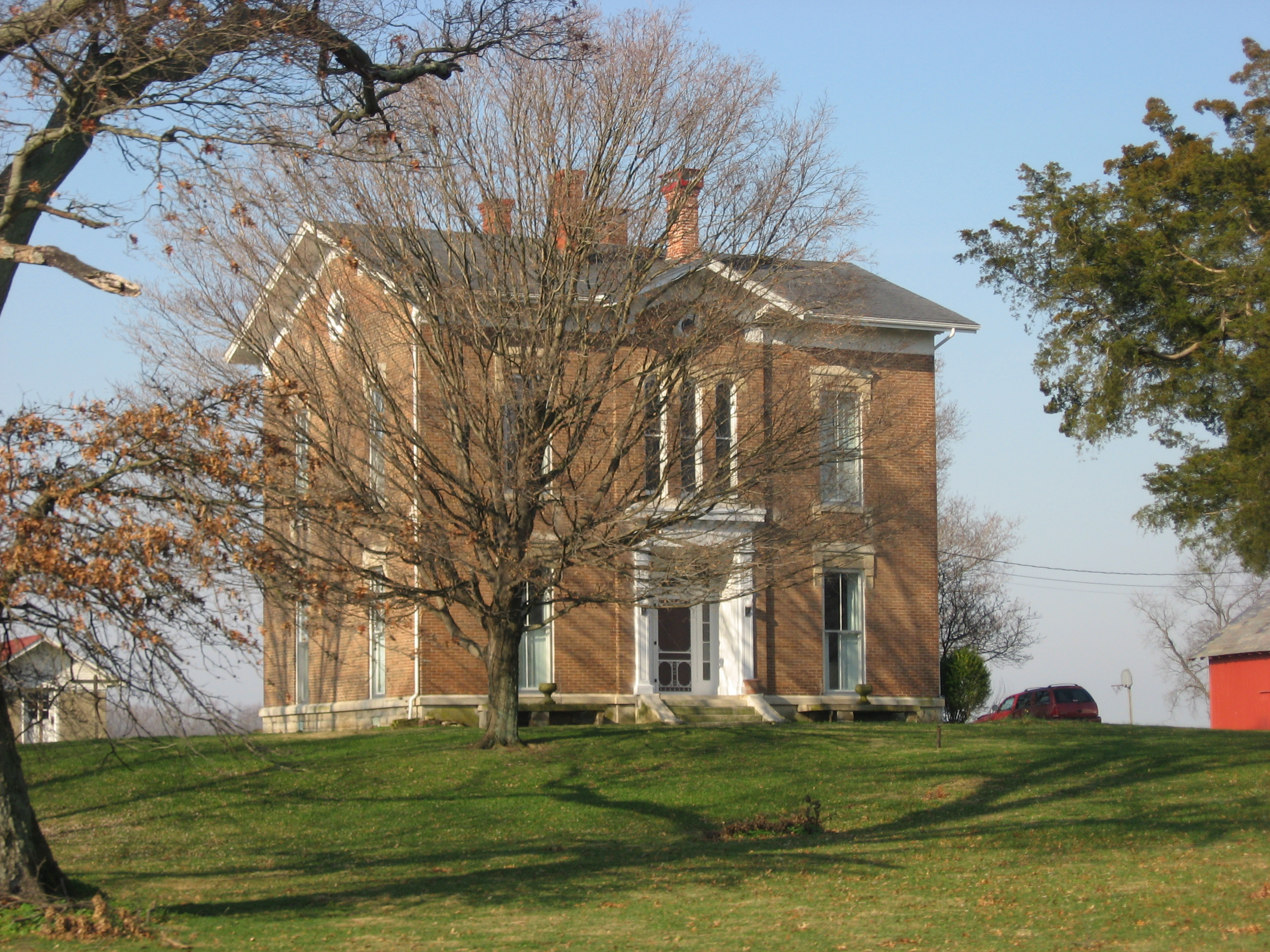
- Newsom–Marr farmhouse, December 2011

- Location within Bartholomew County, Indiana Location within Indiana Location within the United States
- Location: 4950 S. 150E, south of Columbus, Sand Creek Township, Bartholomew County, Indiana
- Coordinates: 39°09′17″N 85°53′02″W
- Area: 4 acres (1.6 ha)
- Built: 1864
- Built by: Perkinson, James W.
- Architectural style: Italianate, Three Portal Barn
- NRHP reference No.: 02000195
- Added to NRHP: March 20, 2002

Newsom–Marr Farm, also known as Shady Lane Farm, is a historic home and farm located at Sand Creek Township, Bartholomew County, Indiana. The house was built in 1864, and is a 2 1/2-story, three-bay, Italianate style brick dwelling with a side-gable roof. Also on the property are the contributing Midwest three portal barn (c. 1860), wagon shed (c. 1860), traverse-frame barn (c. 1910), and wash house (c. 1917).

It was listed on the National Register of Historic Places in 2002. One notable member of the family was Vida Newsom, suffragist and clubwoman.
