= Columbus Township, Bartholomew County, Indiana =

Columbus Township
- Township
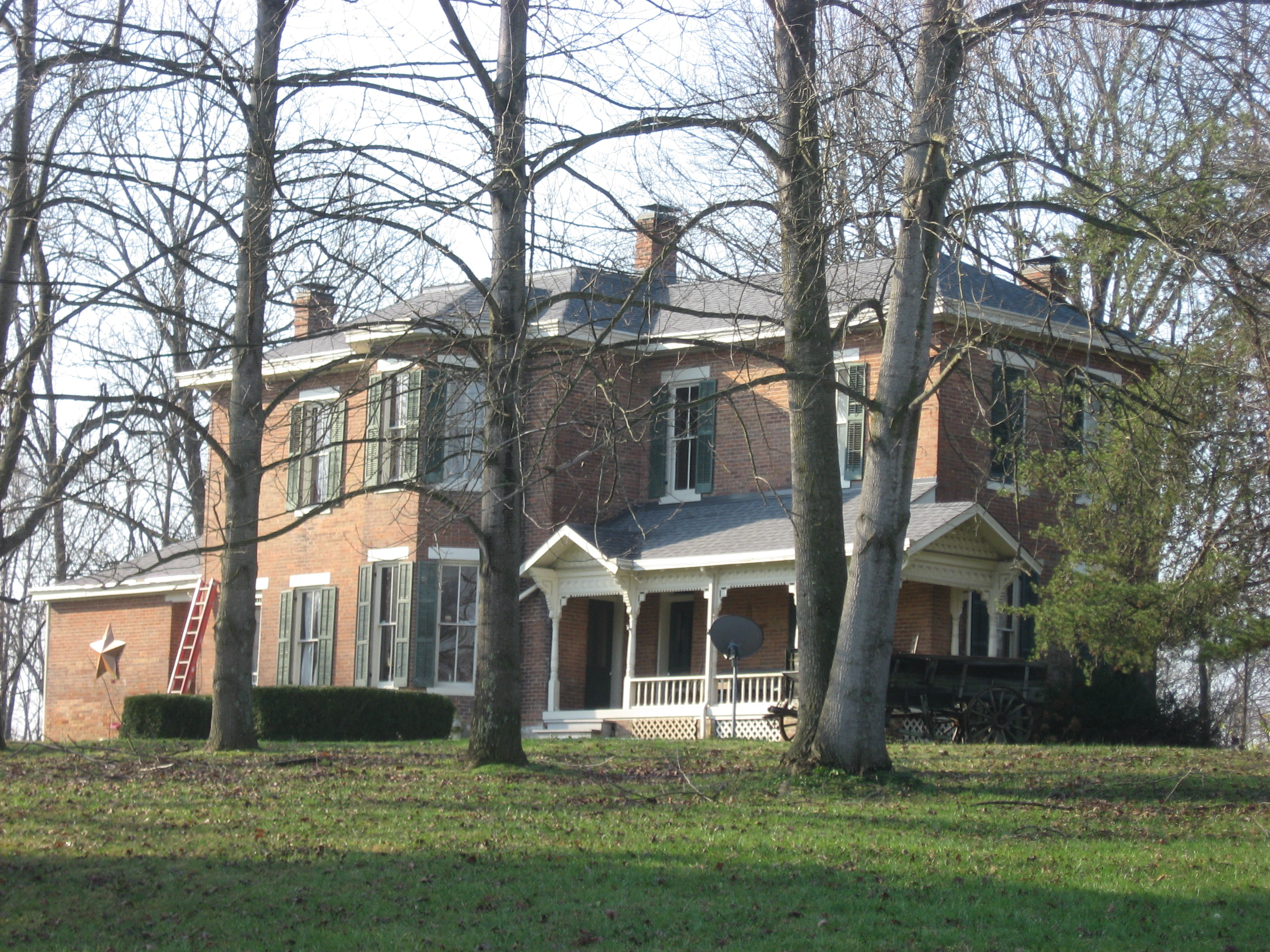
- The D.W. Heagy Farmhouse, a historic site in the township

- Location in Bartholomew County
- Coordinates: 39°12′42″N 85°56′06″W
- Country: United States
- State: Indiana
- County: Bartholomew

Government
  - Type: Indiana township

Area
  - Total: 55.61 sq mi (144.0 km^{2})
  - Land: 54.94 sq mi (142.3 km^{2})
  - Water: 0.66 sq mi (1.7 km^{2}) 1.19%
- Elevation: 617 ft (188 m)

Population (2020)
  - Total: 51,310
  - Density: 829.5/sq mi (320.3/km^{2})
- ZIP codes: 47201, 47203
- GNIS feature ID: 0453243

Columbus Township is one of twelve townships in Bartholomew County, Indiana, United States. As of the 2010 census, its population was 45,578 and it contained 20,516 housing units.

== History ==
The David Aikens House, D.W. Heagy Farm, New Hope Bridge, and James Marr House and Farm are listed on the National Register of Historic Places.

== Geography ==
According to the 2010 census, the township has a total area of 55.61 square miles (144.0 km^{2}), of which 54.94 square miles (142.3 km^{2}) (or 98.80%) is land and 0.66 square miles (1.7 km^{2}) (or 1.19%) is water. Camp Atterbury borders the township to the northwest.

=== Cities, towns, villages ===
- Columbus (south three-quarters)

=== Unincorporated communities ===
- Corn Brook
- East Columbus
- Everroad Park
- Forest Park
- Garden City

(This list is based on USGS data and may include former settlements.)

=== Adjacent townships ===
- German Township (north)
- Flat Rock Township (northeast)
- Clay Township (east)
- Rock Creek Township (east)
- Sand Creek Township (southeast)
- Wayne Township (south)
- Ohio Township (southwest)
- Harrison Township (west)

=== Cemeteries ===
The township contains these five cemeteries: Carter, Garland Brook, Lambert, Mount Pleasant and Thompson.

=== Major highways ===
- Interstate 65
- U.S. Route 31
- State Road 7
- State Road 9
- State Road 11
- State Road 46

=== Airports and landing strips ===
- Bartholomew County Hospital Airport

=== Rivers ===
- Driftwood River
- Flatrock River

=== Lakes ===
- Crystal Lake
- Long Lake
- Terrace Lake
- Wood Lake

=== Landmarks ===
- Clifty Creek Park
- Donner Park
- Lincoln Park
- Noblitt Park
- Mill Race Park

== School districts ==
- Bartholomew Consolidated School Corporation

== Political districts ==
- Indiana's 6th congressional district
- State House District 57
- State House District 59
- State House District 65
- State Senate District 41
