= Mary Chawner =

British Silversmith

- Occupation: Silversmith

Mary Chawner, née Burwash, was an English silversmith.

Chawner was the daughter, sister, and wife of silversmiths; her father was the watchcase maker William Burwash, and her husband, whom she married in 1816, was the spoonmaker William Chawner II. The couple had a son, William, and a daughter, Mary Ann. The elder William died on 20 March 1834 and his widow registered her own mark on 14 April the same year; five new marks followed on 25 March 1835. Like her husband, Mary was a spoonmaker as well. She gave her address in London as 16 Hosier Lane. Mary was overseeing the firm until the younger William could take over; however, upon finishing his apprenticeship in 1838, he embarked instead on a religious career. Consequently the business was left to George Adams, Mary Ann's husband. He entered partnership with his mother-in-law on 3 August 1840; on 23 November that year he took full leadership of the firm.

Several pieces bearing the hallmark of Mary Chawner are in the collection of the National Museum of Women in the Arts. These include six William IV tablespoons, from 1835; a William IV fish slice, of the same year; a Victorian fish slice, of 1839; and two Victorian dinner forks, also from that year.
