= Corn Brook, Indiana =

- Unincorporated community
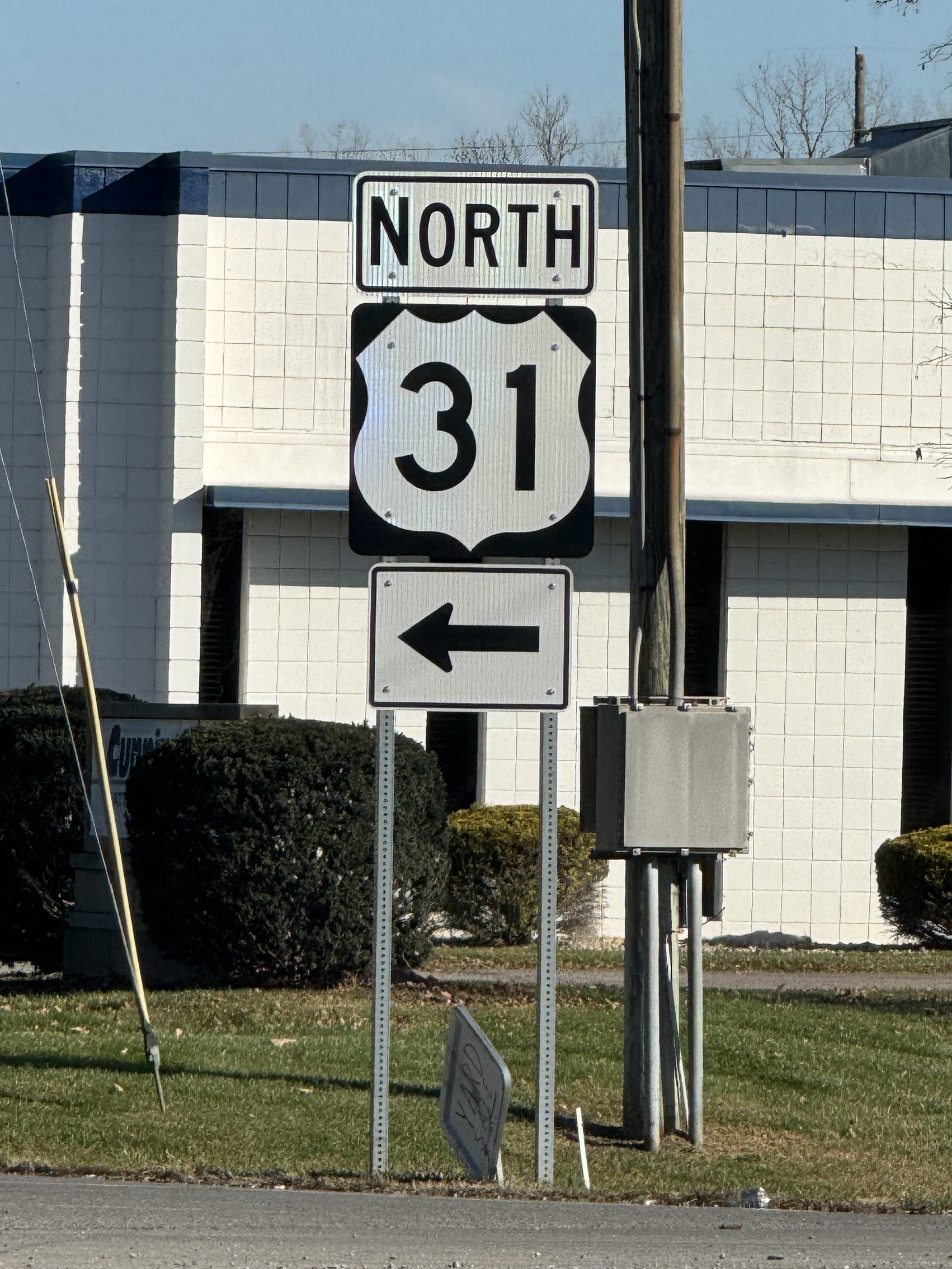
- U.S. Route 31 sign in Corn Brook in 2023.

- Bartholomew County's location in Indiana

- Location in Bartholomew County
- Coordinates: 39°14′52″N 85°56′24″W
- Country: United States
- State: Indiana
- County: Bartholomew
- Township: Columbus
- Elevation: 633 ft (193 m)
- Time zone: UTC-5 (Eastern (EST))
  - Summer (DST): UTC-4 (EDT)
- ZIP code: 47203
- FIPS code: 18-15130
- GNIS feature ID: 432973

Corn Brook is a neighborhood in Columbus, Bartholomew County, in the U.S. state of Indiana. The community is listed as an Unincorporated place by the USGS.
