= Flat Rock Township, Bartholomew County, Indiana =

Flat Rock Township
- Township
- Location in Bartholomew County
- Coordinates: 39°17′49″N 85°51′07″W
- Country: United States
- State: Indiana
- County: Bartholomew

Government
  - Type: Indiana township

Area
  - Total: 31.09 sq mi (80.5 km^{2})
  - Land: 31.09 sq mi (80.5 km^{2})
  - Water: 0 sq mi (0 km^{2}) 0%
- Elevation: 676 ft (206 m)

Population (2020)
  - Total: 1,593
  - Density: 50.6/sq mi (19.5/km^{2})
- ZIP codes: 47203, 47226, 47234, 47246
- GNIS feature ID: 0453296

Flat Rock Township is one of twelve townships in Bartholomew County, Indiana, United States. As of the 2010 census, its population was 1,574 and it contained 653 housing units.

== History ==
The James Marr House and Farm and Pugh Ford Bridge are listed on the National Register of Historic Places.

== Geography ==
According to the 2010 census, the township has a total area of 31.09 square miles (80.5 km^{2}), all land.

=== Cities, towns, villages ===
- Clifford
- Columbus (northeast edge)

=== Unincorporated towns ===
- Nortonburg
- Saint Louis Crossing

(This list is based on USGS data and may include former settlements.)

=== Adjacent townships ===
- Washington Township, Shelby County (northeast)
- Haw Creek Township (east)
- Clay Township (southeast)
- Columbus Township (southwest)
- German Township (west)
- Jackson Township, Shelby County (northwest)

=== Cemeteries ===
The township contains these four cemeteries: Flat Rock, Liberty, Sidney Branch and Spaugh.

=== Airports and landing strips ===
- Columbus Bakalar Municipal Airport

== School districts ==
- Flat Rock-Hawcreek School Corporation

== Political districts ==
- Indiana's 6th congressional district
- Indiana House District 57
- Indiana Senate District 41
