= German Township, Bartholomew County, Indiana =

German Township
- Township
- Location in Bartholomew County
- Coordinates: 39°18′10″N 85°59′20″W
- Country: United States
- State: Indiana
- County: Bartholomew

Government
  - Type: Indiana township

Area
  - Total: 31.33 sq mi (81.1 km^{2})
  - Land: 31.23 sq mi (80.9 km^{2})
  - Water: 0.1 sq mi (0.26 km^{2}) 0.32%
- Elevation: 646 ft (197 m)

Population (2020)
  - Total: 6,980
  - Density: 227.1/sq mi (87.7/km^{2})
- ZIP codes: 46124, 47201, 47203, 47280
- GNIS feature ID: 0453325

German Township is one of twelve townships in Bartholomew County, Indiana, United States. As of the 2010 census, its population was 7,093 and it contained 2,920 housing units.

== History ==
The James Marr House and Farm and Pugh Ford Bridge are listed on the National Register of Historic Places.

== Geography ==
According to the 2010 census, the township has a total area of 31.33 square miles (81.1 km^{2}), of which 31.23 square miles (80.9 km^{2}) (or 99.68%) is land and 0.1 square miles (0.26 km^{2}) (or 0.32%) is water. Camp Atterbury borders the township to the west.

=== Cities, towns, villages ===
- Columbus (north edge)
- Edinburgh (south quarter)
- Taylorsville

=== Unincorporated communities ===
(This list is based on USGS data and may include former settlements.)

=== Adjacent townships ===
- Jackson Township, Shelby County (northeast)
- Washington Township, Shelby County (northeast)
- Flat Rock Township (east)
- Columbus Township (south)
- Blue River Township, Johnson County (northwest)

=== Cemeteries ===
The township contains these three cemeteries: Steenbarger, Tannehill and Treadway.

=== Major highways ===
- Interstate 65
- U.S. Route 31

== School districts ==
- Bartholomew Consolidated School Corporation

== Political districts ==
- Indiana's 6th congressional district
- State House District 59
- State Senate District 41
