= Elizabethtown, Indiana =

- Town
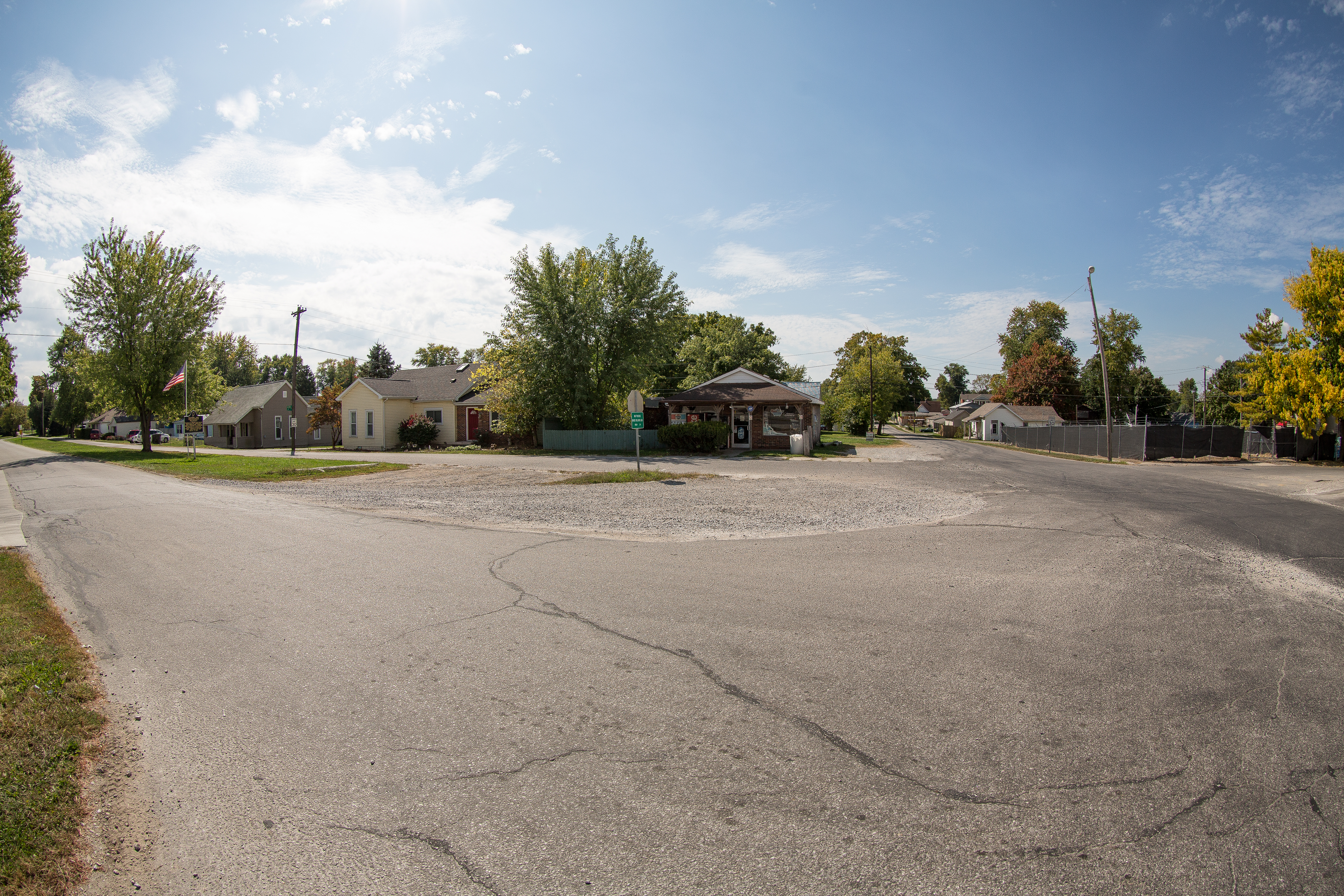

- Location of Elizabethtown in Bartholomew County, Indiana.
- Coordinates: 39°08′06″N 85°48′45″W
- Country: United States
- State: Indiana
- County: Bartholomew
- Township: Sand Creek
- Platted: 1845
- Incorporated: 1871

Area
  - Total: 0.26 sq mi (0.68 km^{2})
  - Land: 0.26 sq mi (0.68 km^{2})
  - Water: 0 sq mi (0.00 km^{2})
- Elevation: 643 ft (196 m)

Population (2020)
  - Total: 406
  - Density: 1,553.6/sq mi (599.83/km^{2})
- Time zone: UTC-5 (EST)
  - Summer (DST): UTC-5 (EST)
- ZIP codes: 47232, 47236
- Area code: 812
- FIPS code: 18-20692
- GNIS feature ID: 2396925

Elizabethtown is a town in Sand Creek Township, Bartholomew County, in the U.S. state of Indiana. The population was 406 at the 2020 census. It is part of the Columbus, Indiana metropolitan statistical area.

== History ==
Elizabethtown was platted in 1845. It was named for Elizabeth Branham, the wife of the founder. The post office at Elizabethtown has been in operation since 1844.

In 1871, Elizabethtown was incorporated as a town.

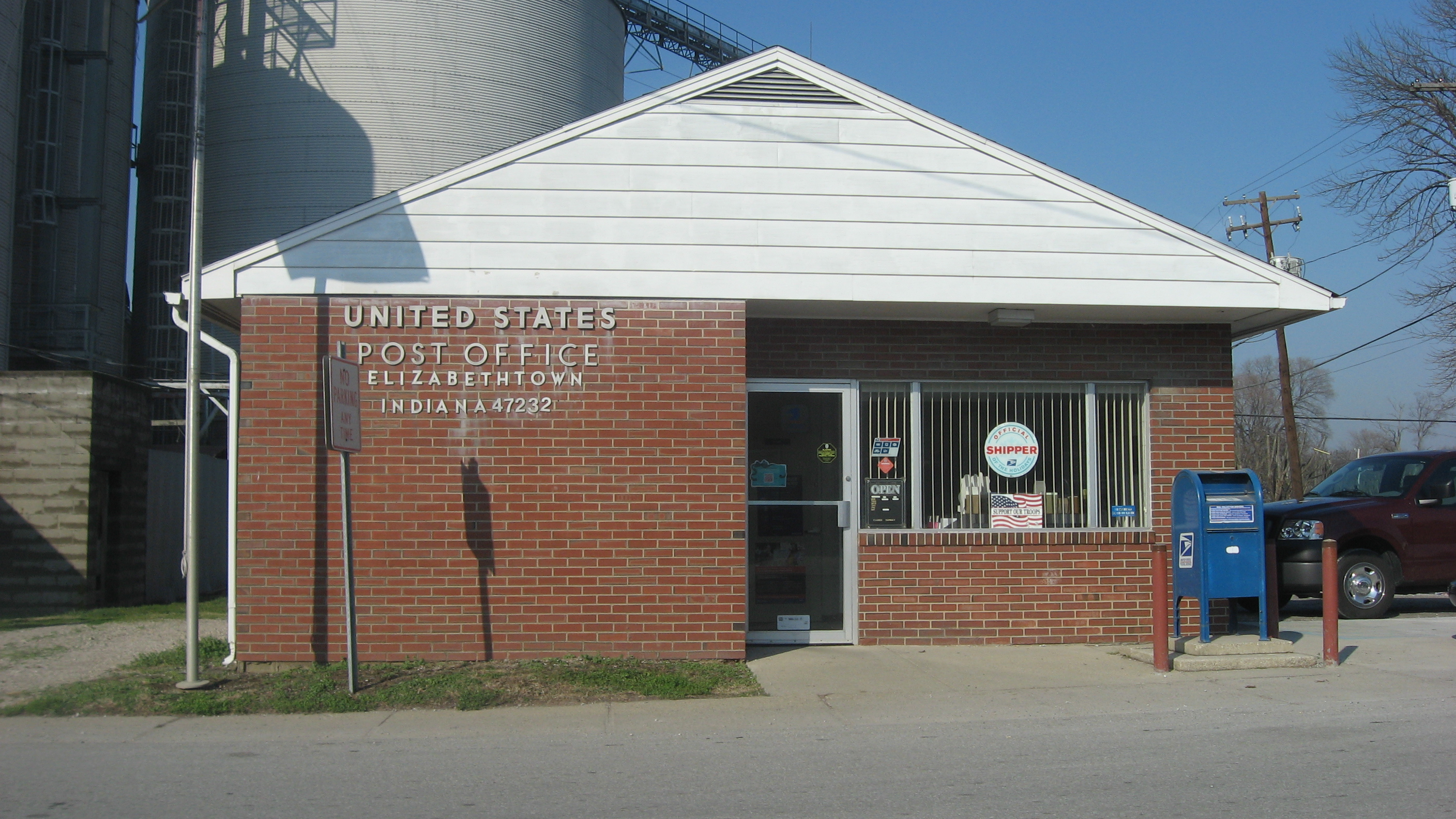
Elizabethtown's post office

== Geography ==
According to the 2010 census, Elizabethtown has a total area of 0.25 square miles (0.65 km^{2}), all land.

== Demographics ==
Historical population
Census	Pop.	Note	%±
1860	200		—
1870	294		47.0%
1880	391		33.0%
1890	430		10.0%
1900	407		−5.3%
1910	350		−14.0%
1920	313		−10.6%
1930	294		−6.1%
1940	319		8.5%
1950	323		1.3%
1960	417		29.1%
1970	519		24.5%
1980	603		16.2%
1990	495		−17.9%
2000	391		−21.0%
2010	504		28.9%
2020	406		−19.4%
U.S. Decennial Census

=== 2010 census ===
As of the census of 2010, there were 504 people, 174 households, and 131 families living in the town. The population density was 2,016.0 inhabitants per square mile (778.4/km^{2}). There were 198 housing units at an average density of 792.0 per square mile (305.8/km^{2}). The racial makeup of the town was 91.1% White, 1.0% African American, 7.1% from other races, and 0.8% from two or more races. Hispanic or Latino of any race were 9.5% of the population.

There were 174 households, of which 47.1% had children under the age of 18 living with them, 52.9% were married couples living together, 16.7% had a female householder with no husband present, 5.7% had a male householder with no wife present, and 24.7% were non-families. 21.3% of all households were made up of individuals, and 9.2% had someone living alone who was 65 years of age or older. The average household size was 2.90 and the average family size was 3.26.

The median age in the town was 31.4 years. 30.4% of residents were under the age of 18; 11% were between the ages of 18 and 24; 25.5% were from 25 to 44; 23.9% were from 45 to 64; and 8.9% were 65 years of age or older. The gender makeup of the town was 49.2% male and 50.8% female.

=== 2000 census ===
As of the census of 2000, there were 391 people, 147 households, and 108 families living in the town. The population density was 1,552.9 inhabitants per square mile (599.6/km^{2}). There were 175 housing units at an average density of 695.0 per square mile (268.3/km^{2}). The racial makeup of the town was 97.70% White, 0.77% African American, 0.26% Native American, 0.26% Asian, and 1.02% from two or more races. Hispanic or Latino of any race were 0.51% of the population.

There were 147 households, out of which 38.8% had children under the age of 18 living with them, 59.2% were married couples living together, 10.2% had a female householder with no husband present, and 26.5% were non-families. 21.8% of all households were made up of individuals, and 8.8% had someone living alone who was 65 years of age or older. The average household size was 2.66 and the average family size was 3.11.

In the town, the population was spread out, with 28.4% under the age of 18, 9.5% from 18 to 24, 30.2% from 25 to 44, 19.4% from 45 to 64, and 12.5% who were 65 years of age or older. The median age was 32 years. For every 100 females there were 101.5 males. For every 100 females age 18 and over, there were 101.4 males.

The median income for a household in the town was $36,364, and the median income for a family was $41,364. Males had a median income of $29,500 versus $20,333 for females. The per capita income for the town was $16,373. About 8.8% of families and 12.7% of the population were below the poverty line, including 19.4% of those under age 18 and 13.6% of those age 65 or over.

== Environmental Challenge ==
In November 2017, Elizabethtown celebrated the six-year anniversary of the Environmental Challenge. To date, Elizabethtown has won over $750,000 in grants and hosted over 600 volunteers to help elderly and disabled neighbors, build a children's library and children's playground. In 2012 Elizabethtown won an Environmental Challenge Award and in 2013 won a KaBoom grant for a children's playground. In 2015 Elizabethtown won a $475,000 storm water grant, also in 2015, Elizabethtown volunteers completed a six sigma project and won a tornado warning siren grant In 2017, Elizabethtown won a community cross roads grant.

== Notable person ==
- James C. Veatch - division commander and brigadier general during the Civil War
