= Sand Creek Township, Bartholomew County, Indiana =

Sand Creek Township
- Township
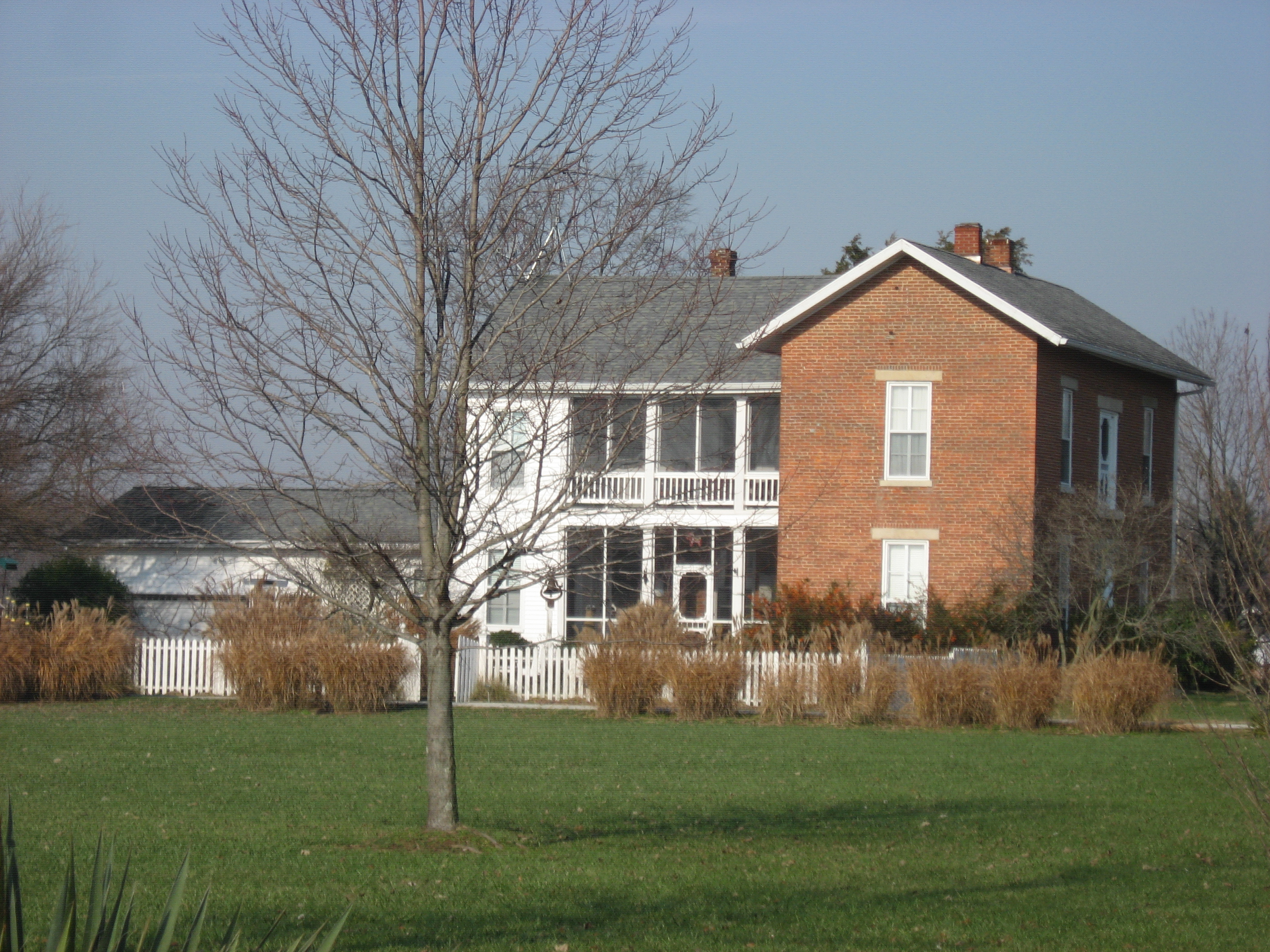
- The William R. Gant Farmhouse, a historic site in the township

- Location in Bartholomew County
- Coordinates: 39°07′17″N 85°50′28″W
- Country: United States
- State: Indiana
- County: Bartholomew

Government
  - Type: Indiana township

Area
  - Total: 26.49 sq mi (68.6 km^{2})
  - Land: 26.21 sq mi (67.9 km^{2})
  - Water: 0.27 sq mi (0.70 km^{2}) 1.02%
- Elevation: 630 ft (192 m)

Population (2020)
  - Total: 2,251
  - Density: 91.2/sq mi (35.2/km^{2})
- ZIP codes: 47201, 47203, 47232
- GNIS feature ID: 0453831

Sand Creek Township is one of twelve townships in Bartholomew County, Indiana, United States. As of the 2010 census, its population was 2,390 and it contained 919 housing units.

== History ==
The Elnora Daugherty Farm, William R. Gant Farm, and Newsom-Marr Farm are listed on the National Register of Historic Places.

== Geography ==
According to the 2010 census, the township has a total area of 26.49 square miles (68.6 km^{2}), of which 26.21 square miles (67.9 km^{2}) (or 98.94%) is land and 0.27 square miles (0.70 km^{2}) (or 1.02%) is water.

=== Cities, towns, villages ===
- Elizabethtown

=== Unincorporated towns ===
- Azalia

=== Adjacent townships ===
- Rock Creek Township (northeast)
- Geneva Township, Jennings County (east)
- Redding Township, Jackson County (south)
- Wayne Township (west)
- Columbus Township (northwest)

=== Cemeteries ===
The township contains these three cemeteries: New Harmony, Sandcreek and Springer.

=== Major highways ===
- U.S. Route 31
- State Road 7

== School districts ==
- Bartholomew Consolidated School Corporation

== Political districts ==
- Indiana's 9th congressional district
- State House District 57
- State House District 65
- State Senate District 41
