= Mount Healthy =

Mount Healthy may refer to:

== Places ==
United States

- Mount Healthy, Indiana
- Mount Healthy, Ohio
  - Mount Healthy High School
- Mount Healthy Heights, Ohio

British Virgin Islands

- Mount Healthy windmill, Tortola
