= Mount Healthy windmill =

Ruined windmill in British Virgin Islands

Coordinates: 18.44516°N 64.64064°W

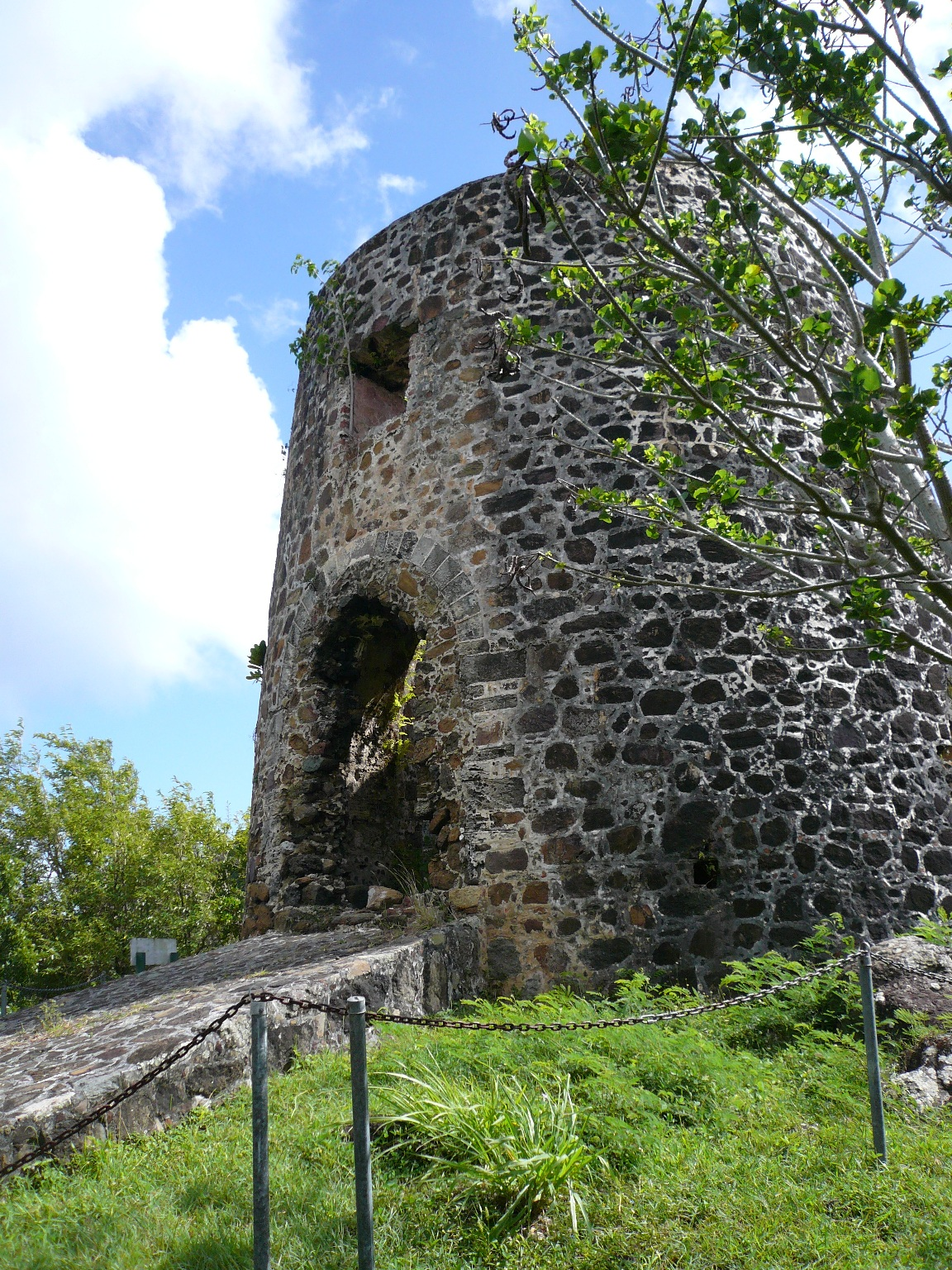
Mount Healthy windmill

Mount Healthy windmill is a ruined windmill on the north side of Tortola in the British Virgin Islands. It was formerly used during the plantation era of the Territory to crush sugar cane. After the collapse of the sugar economy in the early nineteenth century the windmill fell into disuse and became a ruin. It crushed cane for the sugar mill and rum distillery in nearby Brewer's Bay. There are other ruins like the Boiling House, remnants of the Animal Mill Round, distillery, hospital, storage, shed, and housing. The 18th century windmill belonged to the area's wealthiest planter. Slaves harvested and processed sugar cane into sugar at this extensive sugarcane plantation.

One of the owners of the mill was Balziel Hodge, son of the notorious Arthur William Hodge.

Today it is a national park.

== Gallery ==
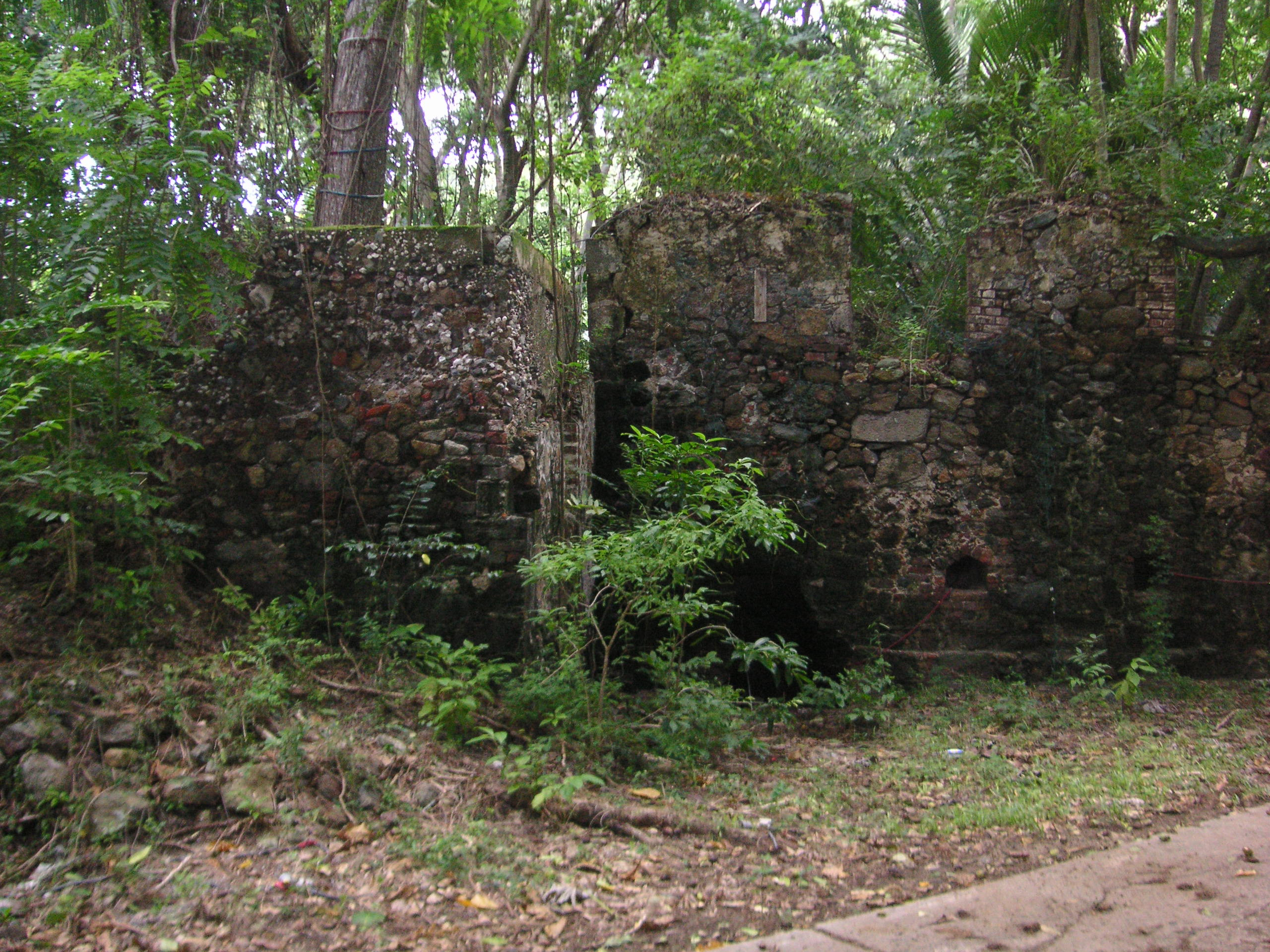
The old sugar mill in Brewer's bay

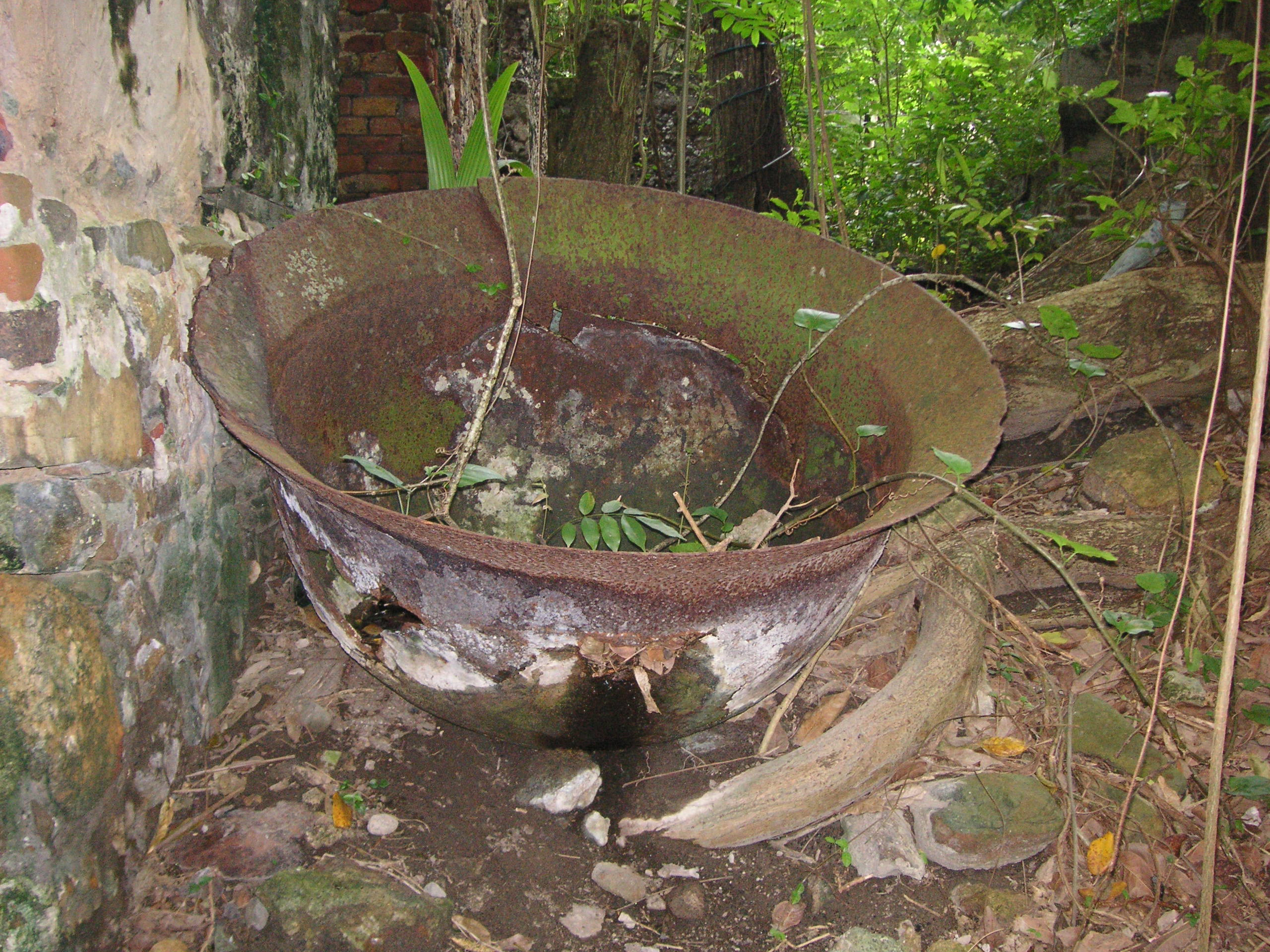
A copper vat for distilling rum from the old sugar mill

== Sources ==
- Isaac Dookhan, History of the British Virgin Islands, ISBN 0-85935-027-4
- Vernon Pickering, A Concise History of the British Virgin Islands, ISBN 0-934139-05-9

== See also ==
- History of the British Virgin Islands
