= Dulles people mover =

Two different "people mover" systems are at [[]]:

- AeroTrain (Dulles International Airport)
- Mobile lounge
