= Dulles International Airport Main Terminal =

Airport terminal in Virginia, US

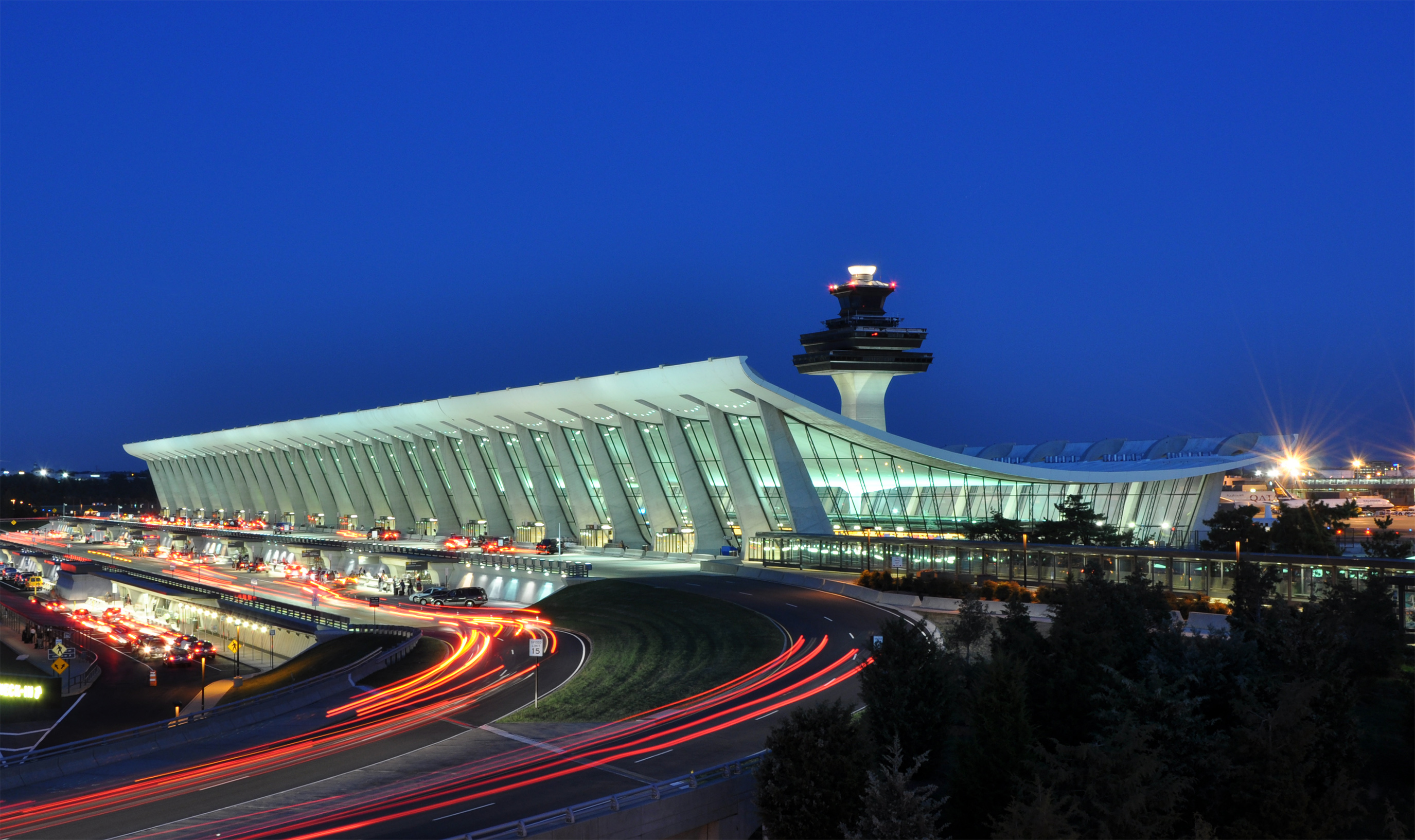
- The terminal at dusk (2011)

General information
- Architectural style: Mid-century modern
- Location: Dulles International Airport; Dulles, Virginia, United States
- Coordinates: 38°57′10″N 77°26′52″W
- Construction started: April 1960
- Opened: November 17, 1962
- Renovated: 1978–1980, 1993–1996, 2000–2010

Technical details
- Material: Glass, metal, concrete
- Floor count: 2 (+2 basement)
- Floor area: 1.1×10^{6} ft^{2} (100,000 m^{2})

Design and construction
- Architect: Eero Saarinen
- Structural engineer: Ammann & Whitney
- Services engineer: Burns & McDonnell (mechanical)
- Main contractor: Corbetta Construction Company

Renovating team
- Architect: Skidmore, Owings and Merrill

The Dulles International Airport Main Terminal is located in Loudoun and Fairfax counties in Dulles, Virginia, United States. The original structure, 600 feet (180 m) long and 150 feet (46 m) wide, was designed by Eero Saarinen and completed in 1962 as the first terminal at Dulles International Airport. Annexes to the west and east were completed in 1996 as part of a renovation designed by Skidmore, Owings & Merrill (SOM), bringing its total length to 1,240 feet (380 m). The terminal is operated by the Metropolitan Washington Airports Authority, which operates Dulles Airport as a whole. The terminal's design is a suspended structure with roof panels of precast concrete suspended between cables which span the width of the building.

The Main Terminal's design includes parallel slanted colonnades on the terminal's north and south facades, interspersed with glass walls. The landside facade to the north is taller than the airside facade to the south; a concave roof supported by cables connects the two facades, descending toward the center. A concourse and control tower extend south toward the airport's apron. The interior was originally divided into two levels: an upper story for departing passengers and a lower story for arriving passengers. Saarinen's original design included mobile lounges that ferried passengers directly to planes, reducing the need for long walks or taxiing while increasing the airport's operational flexibility. The modern terminal includes four airline gates known as Z gates, where aircraft could unload passengers directly. In addition, two basements contain security screening facilities and an AeroTrain people-mover station.

The 1950 Washington Airport Act provided funding for Dulles Airport, land for which was acquired in January 1958. Saarinen was selected that May to design the terminal, construction of which began in early 1960. After several delays, the terminal was dedicated on November 17, 1962, along with the rest of the airport. Initially, Dulles Airport saw lower-than-expected usage, but increased patronage prompted the airport's original operator, the Federal Aviation Administration (FAA), to contemplate an expansion in the early 1970s. Hellmuth, Obata & Kassabaum (HOK) built two small annexes to the south in 1978, and further expansions and additional terminals were contemplated in the 1980s following increases in patronage. SOM designed annexes to the west and east, which began construction in October 1993 and were dedicated on September 6, 1996. Additional expansions took place in the 2000s, including the Z gates and the basements.

The structure was widely acclaimed when it was completed, particularly regarding its shape; Saarinen reportedly considered it his best work. The terminal has received numerous awards, including the American Institute of Architects' Twenty-five Year Award, and other terminal buildings have been compared with it. Though the Main Terminal was deemed eligible for inclusion on the National Register of Historic Places in March 1978, it was not added due to the FAA's objection.

== Description ==
The Main Terminal of Dulles International Airport is in Dulles, Virginia, United States, some 26 to 27 miles (42 to 43 km) from Washington, D.C. (Note: The airport is so large that both of these figures are correct, depending on where the distance is being measured from. However, some figures give a substantially different (and incorrect) figure of 17 miles (27 km).) The airport, serving the Washington metropolitan area, straddles the border between Loudoun and Fairfax counties. The terminal is placed between Dulles Airport's original north–south runways. It is one of several terminal structures at Dulles Airport, along with several outlying "midfield concourses" and the International Arrivals Building, all of which were developed after the original terminal. The terminal was built to smaller dimensions than comparable terminals at other airports because it used mobile lounges, which transported passengers from the terminal to planes and, later, to the concourses.

The original terminal was designed in a mid-century modern style by Eero Saarinen and was his only work in Virginia. Saarinen worked with structural engineering firm Ammann & Whitney, mechanical engineering firm Burns & McDonnell, and airport consultant Charles Landrum. The Corbetta Construction Company was the main contractor, while Humphreys & Harding installed the finishes. Other figures involved in the building's construction included lighting consultant Richard Kelly and landscape designer Dan Kiley. The Main Terminal was intended to symbolize the Jet Age and, from the outset, was designed with future expansions in mind. Saarinen described his design as a "huge continuous hammock suspended between concrete trees", saying it represented a solution for what to put "between earth and sky". The western and eastern annexes were designed by David Childs, Michael McCarthy, and Marilyn Taylor of Skidmore, Owings and Merrill (SOM) in a similar style to the original building. Ammann & Whitney was also the engineer for SOM's expansion.

=== Exterior ===
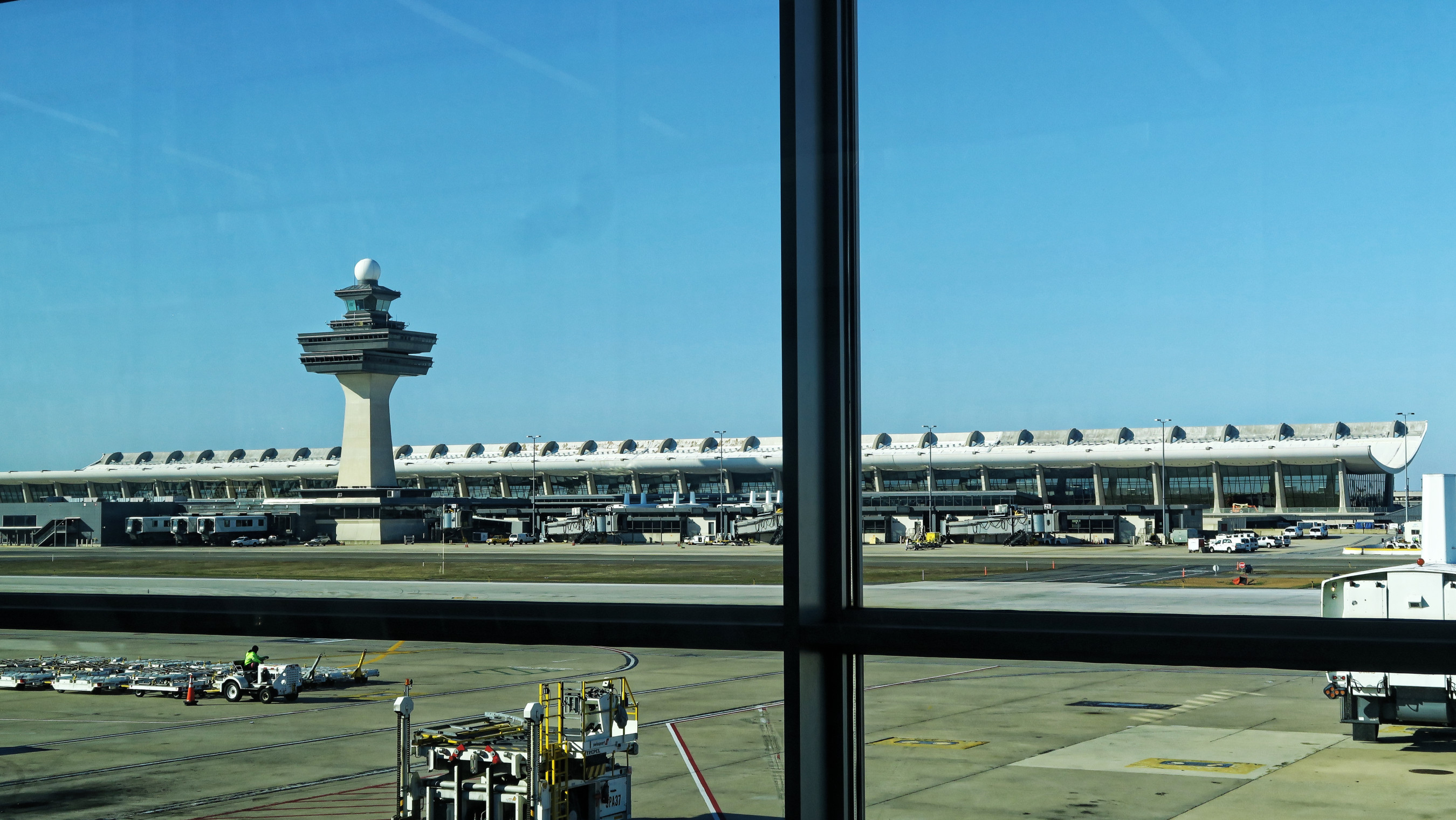
View from the south (2020)

The original terminal measured 600 feet (180 m) long and 150 feet (46 m) wide. (Note: Other sources give a width of 152 feet (46 m) or 200 feet (61 m).) Both ends were built with provisions for extensions measuring 300 feet (90 m) long, (Note: Other sources say the building was constructed with provisions for extensions measuring 320 feet (98 m) long. giving the terminal an ultimate length of 1,240 feet (380 m).) for a total length of 1,200 feet (370 m). The base of the original terminal, including vehicular ramps, was intended to support such an expansion, which was intended to have the same cross-section as the original terminal. In particular, the vehicular ramps paralleled the terminal for its entire proposed length, and Saarinen added empty openings at the terminal's base to accommodate future entrances. When the annexes were eventually built in the 1990s, they were 320 feet (98 m) long, giving the terminal a total length of 1,240 feet (380 m). Just west of the Main Terminal is the International Arrivals Terminal, which abuts the Main Terminal's base.

The vehicular drop-off and pick-up ramps are on the north, or landside, facade of the terminal; there were originally separate loading bays for taxis, private vehicles, and buses or limousines. The ramps loop around a parking area nicknamed the "bowl", while later parking garages were built away from the terminal to preserve views of the building. The ramps are reached by the Dulles Access Road, which leads east toward Washington, D.C. The Dulles Access Road, the airport's original main approach road, was intended as a major part of the terminal's design, providing passengers views of the building as it emerged from the landscape; it was landscaped by Kiley. Plans for a Washington Metro line to serve the terminal had been considered since the 1960s, though the Dulles International Airport station did not open until 2022. A 1996 expansion to the original terminal contained provisions for connections to a future Metro station.

Along the terminal's south or airside facade, a concourse extends southward. Initially, the southern facade had loading docks for 24 mobile lounges, with 12 on either side of the south concourse. There is a 177-foot-tall (54 m) (Note: Sometimes cited as 193 feet (59 m)) airport control tower above the south concourse. The tower itself is 160 feet (49 m) tall and is topped by a radome measuring 17 feet (5.2 m) in diameter; the tower was decommissioned in 2007 but remains in place. The Main Terminal also has four gates known as the Z gates, where aircraft can load and unload passengers directly; these are located along the southern facade, east of the south concourse. South of the terminal is the airport's apron.

==== Facade ====
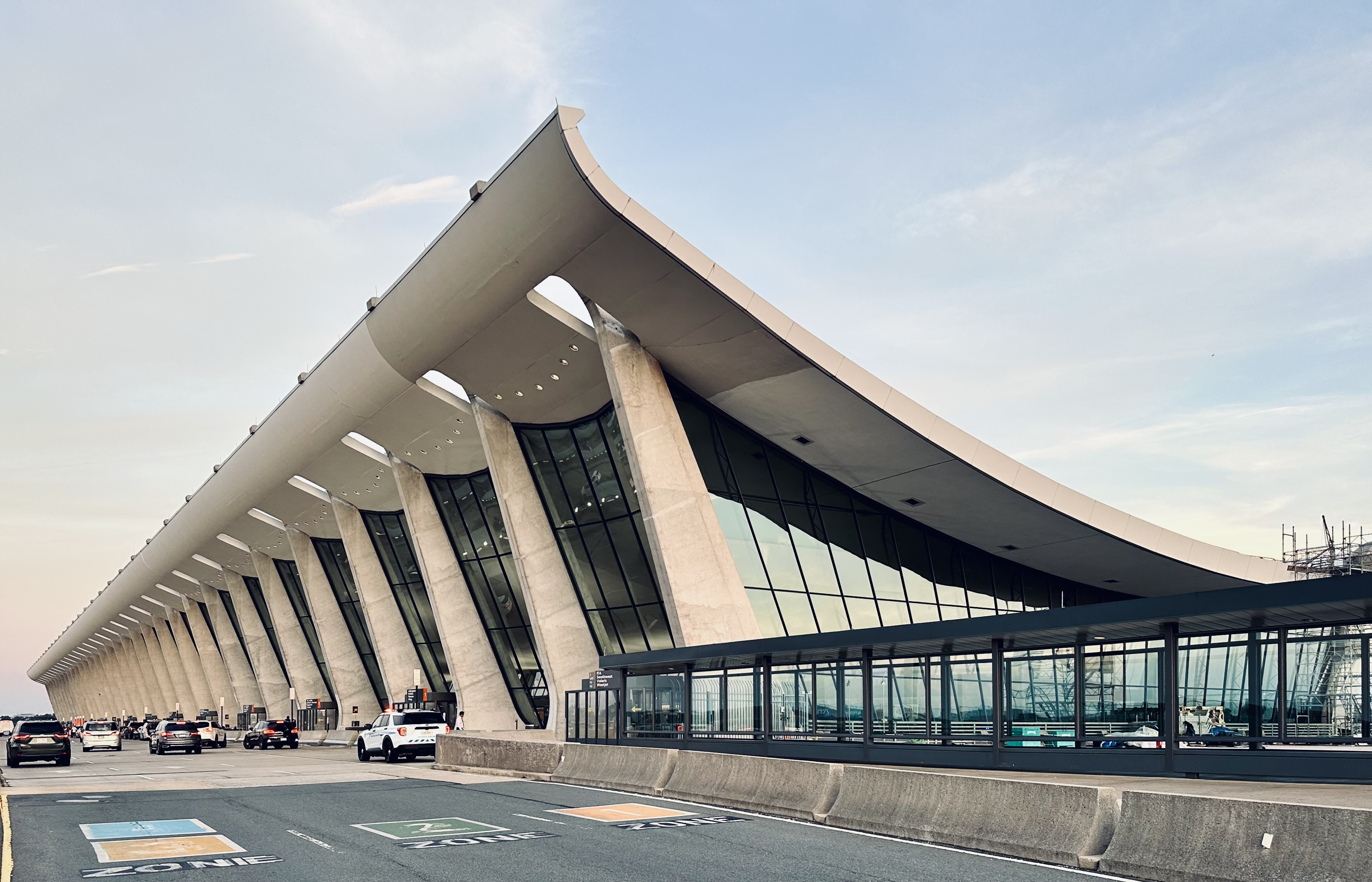
Exterior view of the northern (landside) colonnade of the terminal (2023)

The concave roof is supported by two parallel colonnades to the north and south, which divide each facade into bays measuring 40 feet (12 m) wide. In the original portion of the terminal, there are 16 columns in each colonnade. The northern colonnade's columns (facing the land side) are 65 feet (20 m) high, while the southern colonnade's columns (facing the air side) are 40 feet (12 m) high. (Note: These dimensions are given by several sources. Some sources have given different heights of 64 feet (20 m) for the taller columns, or 45 feet (14 m) for the shorter columns.) The columns are all made of reinforced concrete, which is bush hammered; the rebar, or reinforcing steel, in the columns was manufactured by Bethlehem Steel. Each of the taller columns has 20 short tons (18 long tons; 18 t) of reinforcing steel, while each of the shorter columns is reinforced by 16 short tons (14 long tons; 15 t) of steel. The columns slant outward at an angle of either 10 or 15 degrees, counteracting the forces of suspension cables that carry the roof. At the top of each column are edge beams, which hold the roof's cables in place. When the terminal was extended west and east in the 1990s, the new columns were built to the same dimensions as the original terminals' columns.

The landside columns support a canopy that protrudes 43 feet (13 m) above the landside drop-off ramp. The curtain walls between the columns are made of glass, slanting outward at the same angle as the columns. Each glass pane is placed on rubber gaskets and fastened to the columns using rubber strips; these gaskets tended to fall off after they were installed. The Pittsburgh Plate Glass Company made 70,000 square feet (6,500 m^{2}) of glass for the terminal, which were cut into 1,137 shapes. The window panes are embedded within aluminum frames, which are curved and tilt outward at their tops. The curtain walls in the annexes are similar in style to the original curtain walls, though they use modern gaskets that were less susceptible to falling.

==== Roof ====
The roof is composed of precast concrete panels, suspended between cables that span the width of the building. Nitterhouse Concrete Products in Pennsylvania manufactured the slabs. There are 1,792 concrete slabs in the roof, which each weigh 800 pounds (360 kg) and measure 7.5 inches (190 mm) thick, including a 1.5-inch-thick (38 mm) styrofoam layer on the underside of each panel. The slabs, which measure 8 2/3 by 5 11/12 feet (2.6 by 1.8 m) across, create a deck spanning 89,800 square feet (8,340 m^{2}). The cables, similar in design to the suspenders used on suspension bridges, are 1 inch (25 mm) in diameter and are spaced 10 feet (3.0 m) apart. Concrete stiffening ribs encase each of the cables, preventing the cables from bouncing around; these ribs are 14 to 16 inches (360 to 410 mm) deep. Because the columns are slanted outward, the ribs are about 160 feet (49 m) or 170 feet (52 m) wide.

To improve acoustics, the roof dips at the centerline of the terminal, reaching as low as 26 feet (7.9 m) or 28 feet (8.5 m). The roof's centerline slopes down from both ends toward a drainpipe at the center of the building. The drainpipe is about 30 inches (760 mm) wide and can drain 12,500 US gallons (47 m^{3}) from the roof every minute. Water from the drainpipe is funneled into a catch basin nearby. The roofs over the 1990s extensions are similar in design to the original roof.

=== Interior ===
Originally, the terminal spanned 500,000 square feet (46,000 m^{2}). (Note: One source says that the main terminal originally spanned 362,442 square feet (33,672.0 m^{2}).) During a 1996 expansion, the size of the Main Terminal was more than doubled, increasing to about 1.1 million square feet (100,000 m^{2}). The interiors were initially designed in a palette of green, blue, brown, and gray hues, to match the landscape. Originally, the Main Terminal's upper level was for departing passengers, while the lower level was for arriving passengers. The west and east wings have a combined 600,000 square feet (56,000 m^{2}) and contain an additional basement level that is not present under the original terminal.

==== Structural and mechanical features ====
The cable roof allowed Saarinen to construct the upper story without columns. The lower story sits on a concrete floor slab, and the upper story's floor slab is made of reinforced concrete. On the lower story, columns are placed at regular intervals, supporting concrete beams above; these beams are aligned with the colonnades on the facade. The lower-story columns flare outward at their bases purely for decorative purposes. The original interiors are divided into bays measuring 40 by 150 feet (12 by 46 m), spanning the terminal's entire width and corresponding to the facade's bays. Each interior bay could be configured with its own ticket counter, baggage facility, concessions, and two loading bays for mobile lounges. Saarinen's original design allowed 40 feet (12 m) bays to be added on either end of the terminal as necessary.

Saarinen's master plan for Dulles Airport called for service buildings both east and west of the Main Terminal; these structures were designed with low roofs so they did not obstruct views from the Main Terminal. The original service building, to the east, included equipment for hot and chilled water production. When the terminal was completed, it was cooled by two large refrigeration units, which had a daily cooling capacity equivalent to 2 million pounds (900 t) of ice.

==== Facilities ====
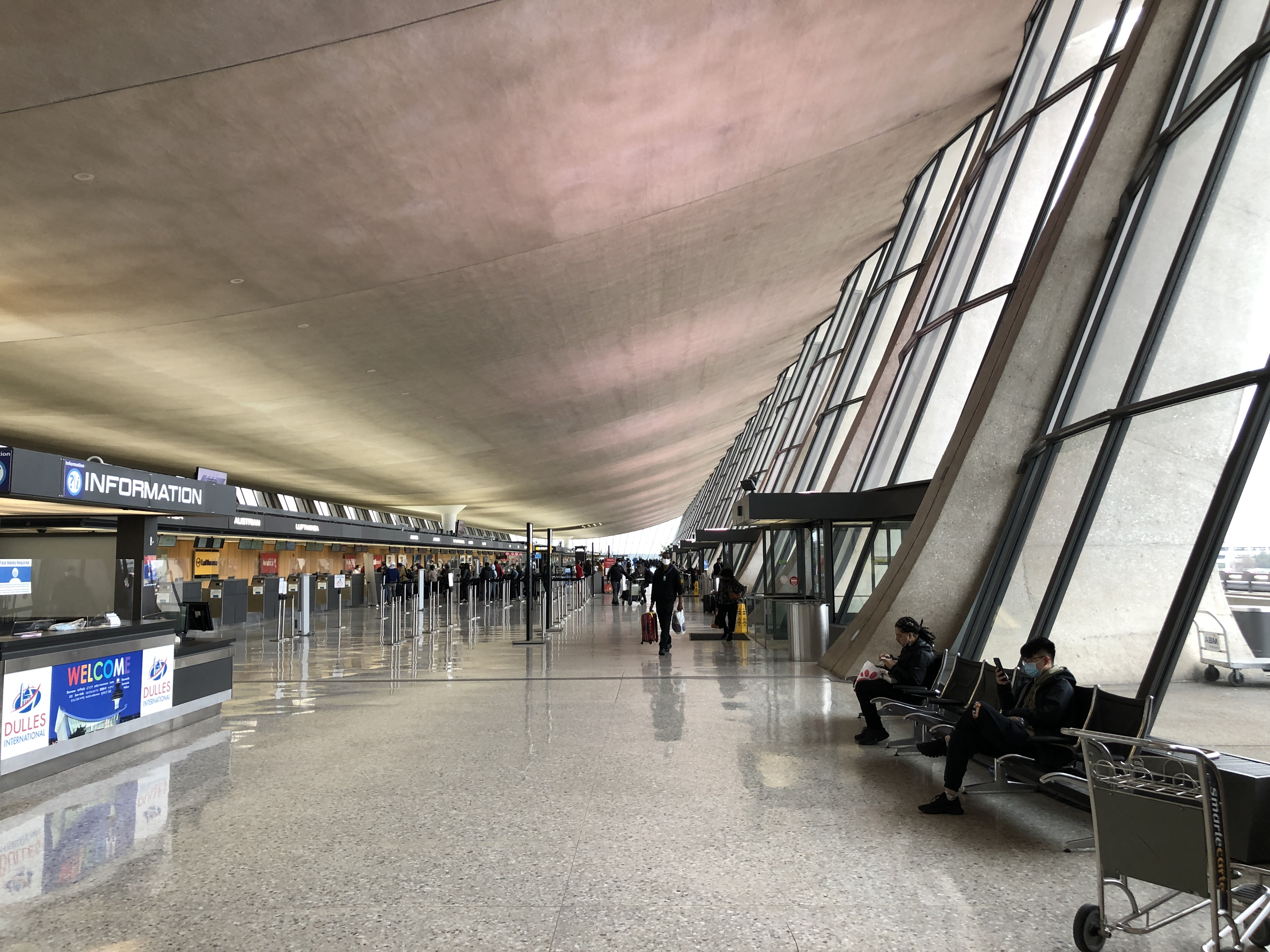
Interior of the upper level, with ticket counters at left and the curtain wall at right (2022)

When the terminal was built, there were ticket counters on the upper level, and conveyor belts that brought baggage to a loading area in the basement. The ticket counters were originally grouped into three clusters. In addition, there were various stores, three seating areas with aluminum and vinyl benches, along with two large departure screens. The original design included very few stores, since it was not originally envisioned as a place to spend extended amounts of time. When the terminal opened, there were 24 mobile-lounge gates. Many of the mobile-lounge gates were subsequently closed with the implementation of stringent security procedures, and some of these gates were infilled with glass in the 1990s. When the terminal was expanded west and east in the 1990s, stores and ticket counters were built in both wings; the annexes have similar terrazzo floors and concrete surfaces to the original terminal. Until the 2000s, the upper story also had security-screening areas.

The lower, or ground, story initially contained regional and commuter airline gates, along with offices and baggage carousels. The lower level also includes a "Dulles Diamond" security screening facility for frequent travelers, as well as baggage carousels and a baggage-sorting facility in the west wing. Escalators connect the upper and lower levels, allowing arriving passengers to pick up their baggage. The south concourse had marble tables and upholstered seats. There was also a reflecting pool in the south concourse, along with lounges on a balcony level overlooking the concourse. Basements under both wings accommodate baggage handling facilities, and there are two basements beneath the original terminal. The original structure's first or upper basement contains security checkpoints spanning 121,700 square feet (11,310 m^{2}); the 8,500-square-foot (790 m^{2}) Capital One Lounge is located between the western and eastern checkpoints. The second or lower basement contains a 54,500-square-foot (5,060 m^{2}) station for the AeroTrain people-mover system.

The taxi and bus–limousine drop-off areas lead directly to the terminal's upper level, and a ramp and escalators lead from the private automobile drop-off areas to the upper level. A 1,000-foot-long (300 m) underpass with moving walkways links the Main Terminal to parking garages and the Dulles International Airport station. The underpass is accessed from the terminal via elevators and a pair of escalators. Another 1,000-foot-long (300 m) tunnel leads south from the Main Terminal to midfield concourse B. Escalators and elevators also descend to the basements.

=== Airside transport ===
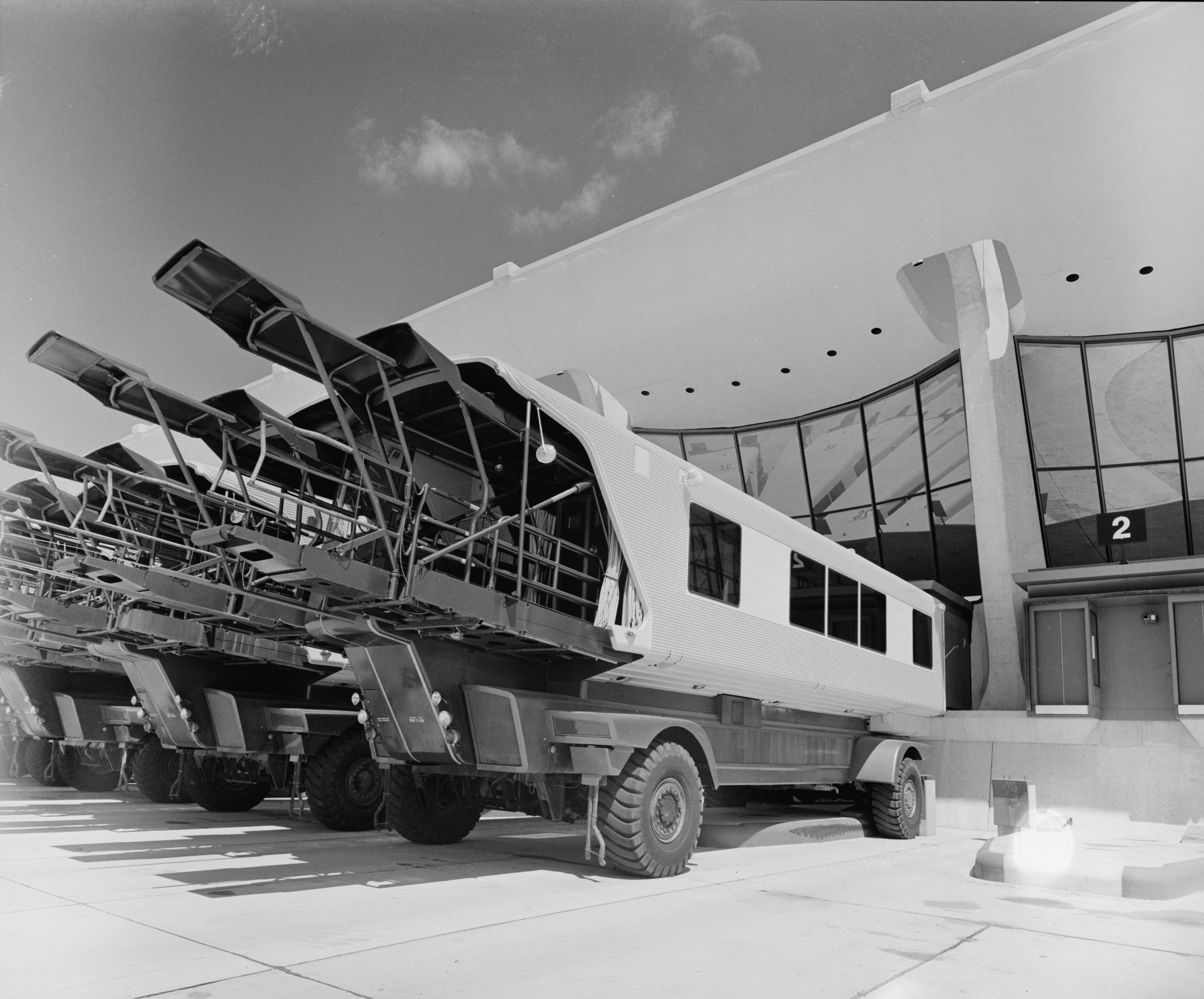
The terminal with its original mobile lounges (c. 1962)

Initially, after passengers were processed at the Main Terminal, they were transported directly to planes via mobile lounges. The original mobile lounges were manufactured by Budd Company and Chrysler. They were similar to airside transfer buses, except that the lounges were intended as movable extensions of the terminal itself, with floors at the same height as the departure level. Each lounge had doorways and adjustable ramps at both ends, along with seats similar to those in the Main Terminal. Though the floor could be raised and lowered to accommodate different plane models' heights, it could not rise above 13 feet (4.0 m). Each mobile lounge could travel at a top speed of about 25 mph (40 km/h). Departure times originally reflected when the lounges left the terminal, and larger planes were served by multiple lounges. The Plane Mate, a variant of the mobile lounge, was introduced in the early 1970s to accommodate wide-body aircraft. In contrast to the lower capacity of the original lounges, (Note: Sources disagree on whether the original lounges could fit 90 or 100 passengers.) the Plane Mates could fit 150 passengers and could rise higher than the original lounges.

Saarinen considered the mobile lounges a solution to three problems—they shortened the walking distance to the plane, reduced taxiing distances, and allowed greater apron flexibility. When the terminal was developed in the 1960s, jet planes could not fit traditional terminals and could only be accessed via long jetways. The mobile lounges eliminated the need for jetways and allowed Dulles Airport to be built with a single terminal, smaller in size than other airports' terminals. They were also intended to increase operational flexibility, because planes no longer had to unload passengers next to the terminal, while also reducing airlines' taxiing fees and keeping aircraft emissions away from the terminal. Passengers also did not have to walk more than a few hundred feet. (Note: Sources disagree on whether the lounges reduced airline passengers' average walking distance to either 150 feet (46 m), 200 feet (61 m), or 300 feet (91 m). One newspaper said that passengers needed to walk just 22 steps from the main entrance to the ticket counter and another 48 steps to the lounges.)

Retrospectively, observers noted that the lounges were inconvenient to use and that passengers making connecting flights had to wait for multiple lounges. When the midfield concourses were built in the 1980s, the mobile lounges began traveling to these concourses instead. The AeroTrain people mover system opened in 2010, traveling to midfield concourses A, B, and C. As of 2025, Dulles Airport's operator Metropolitan Washington Airports Authority retains 19 of Saarinen's mobile lounges and 30 Plane Mates, which operate to Concourse D. As part of a renovation project approved in 2026, new tunnels to the other concourses were to be built, making the remaining mobile lounges obsolete.

== History ==
=== Development ===
The U.S. Congress passed the Washington Inner Airports Act in 1950 to provide funding for a new airport in the Washington metropolitan area. This directly led to the creation of what became Dulles International Airport in Chantilly, Virginia. President Dwight Eisenhower selected the 8,000-acre (3,200 ha) Chantilly site in January 1958, and the U.S. government acquired the land that August. The airport was officially named in 1959 after John Foster Dulles, the United States Secretary of State under Eisenhower. The airport and its Main Terminal were originally controlled directly by the U.S. federal government through the Federal Aviation Administration (FAA).

==== Design ====
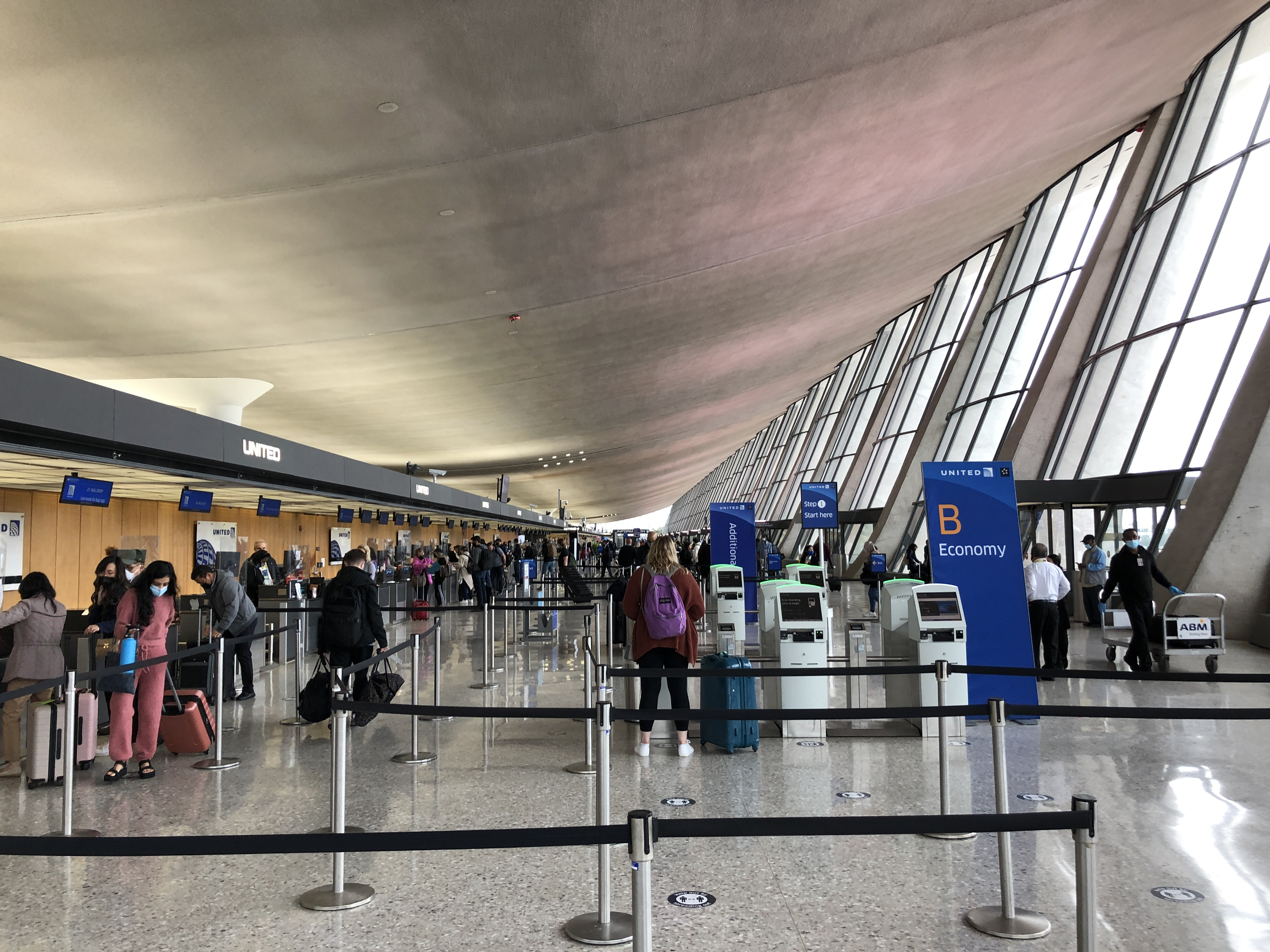
Interior (2022)

The Civil Aeronautics Administration (CAA) selected Eero Saarinen of Bloomfield Hills, Michigan, in May 1958 to design several of Dulles Airport's buildings, including its Main Terminal and control tower. Ammann & Whitney, who led the airport's overall design, had previously worked with Saarinen on Ellinikon International Airport's terminal. At the time, Saarinen was busy designing the TWA Flight Center at Idlewild Airport in New York. Saarinen and Ammann & Whitney worked in collaboration with the airport's mechanical engineering firm Burns & McDonnell and the consultant Charles Landrum to collect data for the design of Dulles Airport's Main Terminal. They studied airport operations, including the distances passengers had to walk to access planes, at airports across the U.S.; the team found that, on average, passengers had to walk 900 feet (270 m) from terminal to plane. The design team was particularly focused on reducing passengers' walking distances, reducing taxiing costs, and increasing flexibility of the apron. Furthermore, they anticipated that Dulles Airport would need 60 gates by 1975 to accommodate increasing demand.

Saarinen sketched his initial designs on legal paper. One early design proposal, by Boyd Anderson of Ammann & Whitney, called for suspension cables between the ground and roof; after Saarinen expressed his satisfaction, the design team instead proposed a cable roof. The CAA reviewed Saarinen's preliminary ideas for the terminal in October 1958. A key component of the plan was mobile lounges that would travel from the terminal directly to planes, eliminating many of the inflexibilities of jetways and fixed gates. The terminal itself was tentatively planned to have separate levels for departing and arriving passengers. Contracts for clearing and grading the site had been awarded by the end of 1958, but no contracts for the terminal had been awarded yet. The terminal design was still in progress by early 1959, at which point it was planned to span 300,000 square feet (28,000 m^{2}). Although no details had been announced at the time, the Evening Star described the design as "something revolutionary".

Saarinen's friend Charles Eames prepared a short film about the mobile lounges to convince airport officials of their efficacy. The FAA (then known as the Federal Aviation Agency) announced details of Saarinen's design in January 1960. The plans called for a 600-by-150-foot (183 by 46 m) double-level structure, with concrete piers supporting a concave curved roof; the building could be doubled in size. To reduce confusion, departing and arriving passengers were segregated on different levels. Saarinen and his associates wanted the design to symbolize the Jet Age while also complementing the classical architecture of Washington, D.C. The control tower and mobile lounges were designed in conjunction with the terminal; the lounges in particular made it possible to reduce the building's size, since long passageways were no longer needed. The final design, including mobile lounges, was selected after the FAA examined over 100 proposals.

==== Construction ====
The FAA awarded contracts for the terminal's heating and cooling systems in August 1959. That October, it ordered a prototype of a mobile lounge and awarded a contract for the terminal's telephone service. The FAA also built settling basins for temporary use until a permanent sewage system for the terminal could be built. The FAA began soliciting bids for the terminal building itself in January 1960 and reviewed the bids the next month. The Corbetta Construction Company of New York City submitted the lowest bid, for $4,432,000, and was subsequently awarded the construction contract. That April, workers began grading the terminal's site and laying foundations. Models of the Main Terminal were displayed at Washington National Airport in August 1960. By then, the U.S. federal government (which originally operated the airport) had oversubscribed all of the ticket counter space and the gates. The demand for ticket counter space was already one-third higher than what was available.

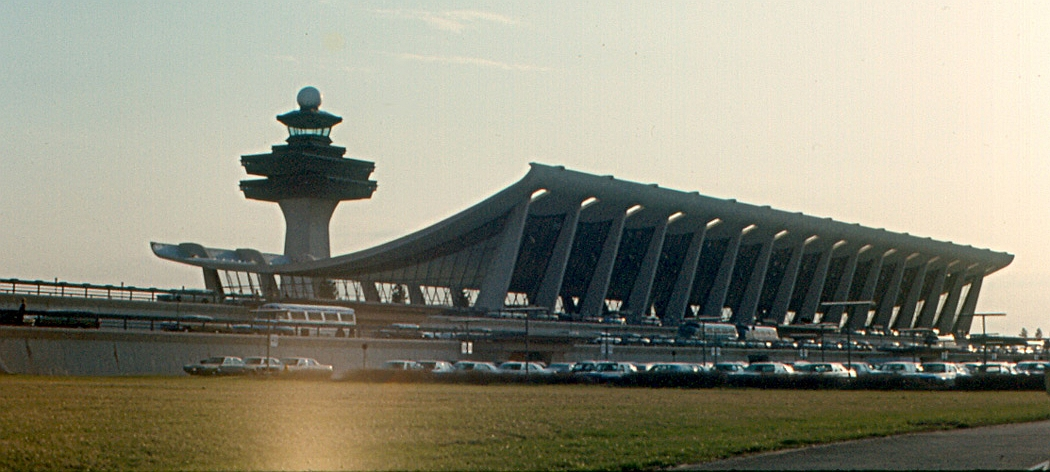
The original terminal seen from the northeast (1970)

The Main Terminal's structural work was half complete by October 1960. At that point, concrete for the lower level had been poured, and workers had erected steel framework on the north and south side of the building, in preparation for the construction of the columns. By the end of the year, the airport was unlikely to be completed by its originally-projected opening date of July 1961, so outgoing FAA administrator Pete Quesada postponed the opening date by one year. By June 1961, the airport's original $85 million budget had more than doubled to $175 million, and FAA administrator Najeeb Halaby said the new terminal would be overcrowded by 1967. Due to a lack of federal funding, the building's initial length was truncated from 1,200 to 600 feet (370 to 180 m).

The terminal was still under construction when Saarinen suddenly died in September 1961, at which point it was budgeted at $12 million. For the construction of each column, workers poured concrete around multiple tons of steel rebar. The rebar in each column surrounded a metal cage, from which a worker oversaw the pour until it was nearly complete; the cage was then encased in concrete. Workers pre-stressed the roof's cables by loading sandbags onto them, thus allowing the cables to carry the roof panels without sagging significantly. The cables were strung between each pair of columns, then bent into shape using concrete blocks and encased in concrete; their installation required many complex computations. The concrete roof ribs were test-loaded after being poured. No stationary scaffolding was used for the terminal's construction, though the roof was built using a movable scaffold.

==== Completion ====
Thirteen airlines had leased space at the airport by late 1961. That November, the FAA awarded a concession for the terminal's bars and restaurants. The FAA paid $4.6 million for the terminal's first 20 mobile lounges that month, but the airlines hesitated at paying the cost. The airlines were also reluctant to give the FAA specifications for space at the terminal until they knew how much their leases would cost. As such, that December, Halaby threatened to take over the design of each airline's spaces unless the airlines provided specifications within two weeks. By then, the control tower was 60% complete. The airlines agreed to lease the Main Terminal's 456-foot (139 m) ticket counter in January 1962, having petitioned for a longer counter. Disputes over fees continued until that June, when the FAA and the airlines agreed on a schedule of operating fees for the mobile lounges and the terminal's space.

The terminal's contractors began working double shifts in April 1962 after Halaby threatened to penalize contractors for not completing the terminal by October 1. During mid-1962, the FAA solicited bids for the construction of service spaces for the airlines. Builders had difficulties constructing the windows; as late as June 1962, none of the glass had been installed. Workers eventually built a custom protractor to cut the glass. Because the windows were to slope outward, workers fitted gaskets around each window to prevent them from tipping over. The FAA announced in August 1962 that the terminal and the rest of the airport would be dedicated that November. By then, workers were finishing the interior, while airport staff were practicing with the mobile lounges. Numerous shops had been leased out, and additional retailers leased space at the terminal that October. As late as a few days before the opening, many parts of the terminal were still incomplete. The final cost was estimated at $16 million.

=== Opening and early use ===
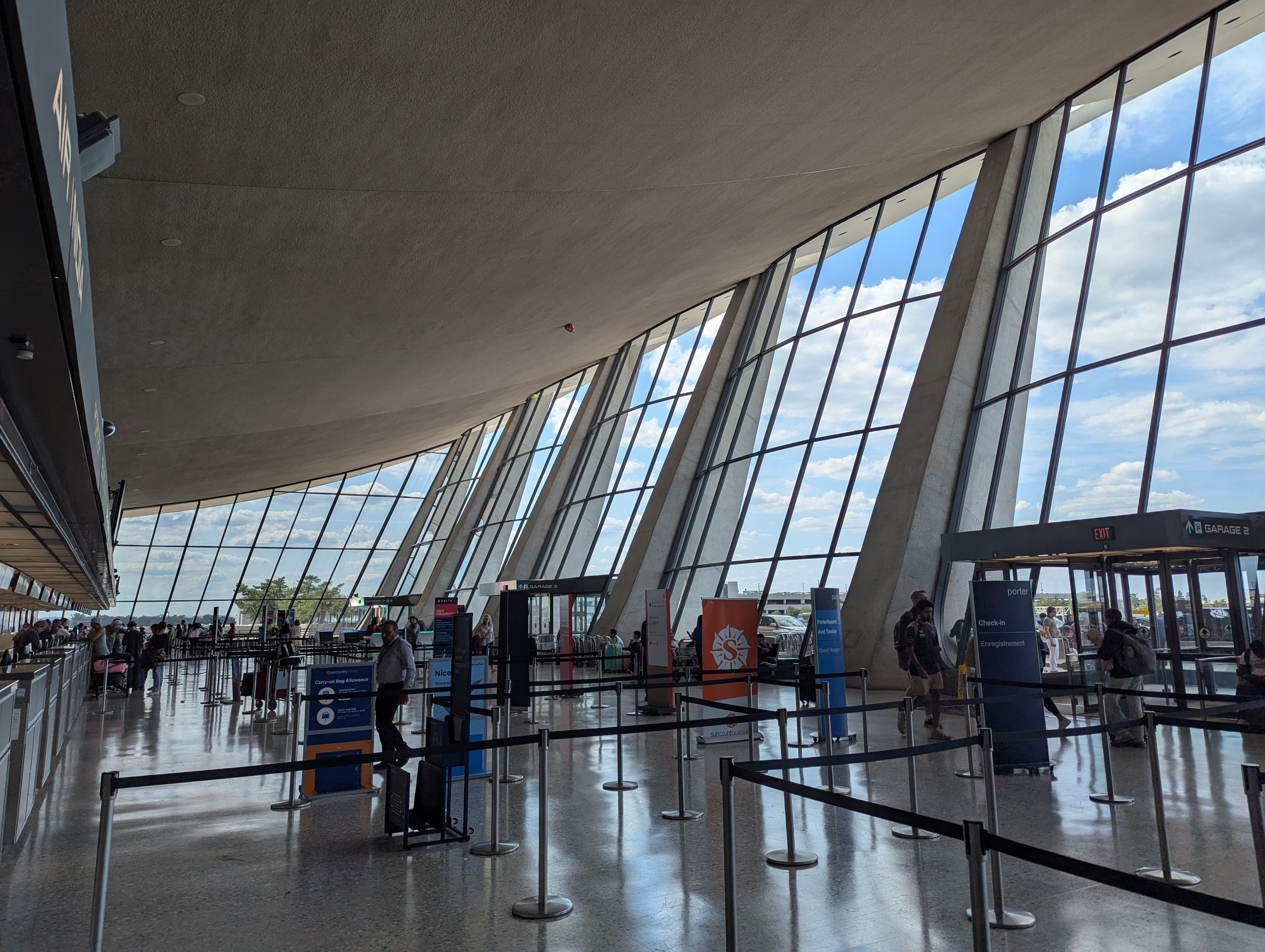
The western end of the terminal, facing the landside facade (2025)

On November 17, 1962, President John F. Kennedy and former president Eisenhower dedicated the airport with a ceremony at the terminal, attended by an estimated 60,000 people. The first passengers began using the terminal two days later, and the terminal recorded 25,000 tourists on its first full Sunday of operation. Some final work was still ongoing, with 15% of the work still incomplete at the time of opening. The terminal quickly became a symbol of the new airport, and it received positive acclaim, in part because its mobile lounges made the planes entirely accessible. Travelers often threw coins into the terminal's reflecting pool; the proceeds were donated to charity. The FAA leased out a duty-free shop at the terminal in early 1963, and a restaurant opened there that November, at which point the terminal was basically complete.

Dulles was initially considered a white elephant, being far from Washington, D.C., with few flights; this negatively impacted terminal concessionaires' business. Newsweek said that staff sometimes outnumbered passengers, and The New York Times wrote that "the terminal has entertained nearly twice as many viewers as travelers". Another source said that "a visitor could roll a bowling ball from one end ... without hitting anyone". Conversely, the terminal was popular as a tourist attraction, and the mobile lounges had become more popular than expected; many visitors paid just to ride the lounges. The terminal and airport continued to experience lower-than-expected patronage in the mid-1960s. Two of the terminal's concessionaires had gone out of business by 1966, while other concessionaires paid discounted rents. At that point, there were somewhat less than a million annual passengers, and only half the mobile lounges were needed. In 1968, the lower level flooded, causing some damage to the terminal. Patronage steadily increased; by 1969, some concessionaires had recorded their first profits.

=== 1970s and early 1980s ===
By the early 1970s, the FAA anticipated that the terminal's usage would increase sixfold, from 2 to 12 million, within a decade. To accommodate the increased traffic, the FAA ordered additional mobile lounges and stopped giving tourists rides on the existing lounges, and U.S. President Richard Nixon allocated $7 million for a possible expansion of the Main Terminal. Early plans called for the building to be lengthened east–west to 920 feet (280 m), increasing hourly capacity from 1,650 to either 2,300 or 2,500 passengers. The architectural firm Hellmuth, Obata & Kassabaum (HOK) was hired in December 1970 to prepare preliminary designs for the expansion. When the National Capital Planning Commission (NCPC) approved the plans in 1972, the project was estimated to cost $12 million. HOK and Peat, Marwick & Mitchell were hired to develop an expansion plan for the terminal, but no progress occurred for several years, in part because of funding shortages and insufficient demand.

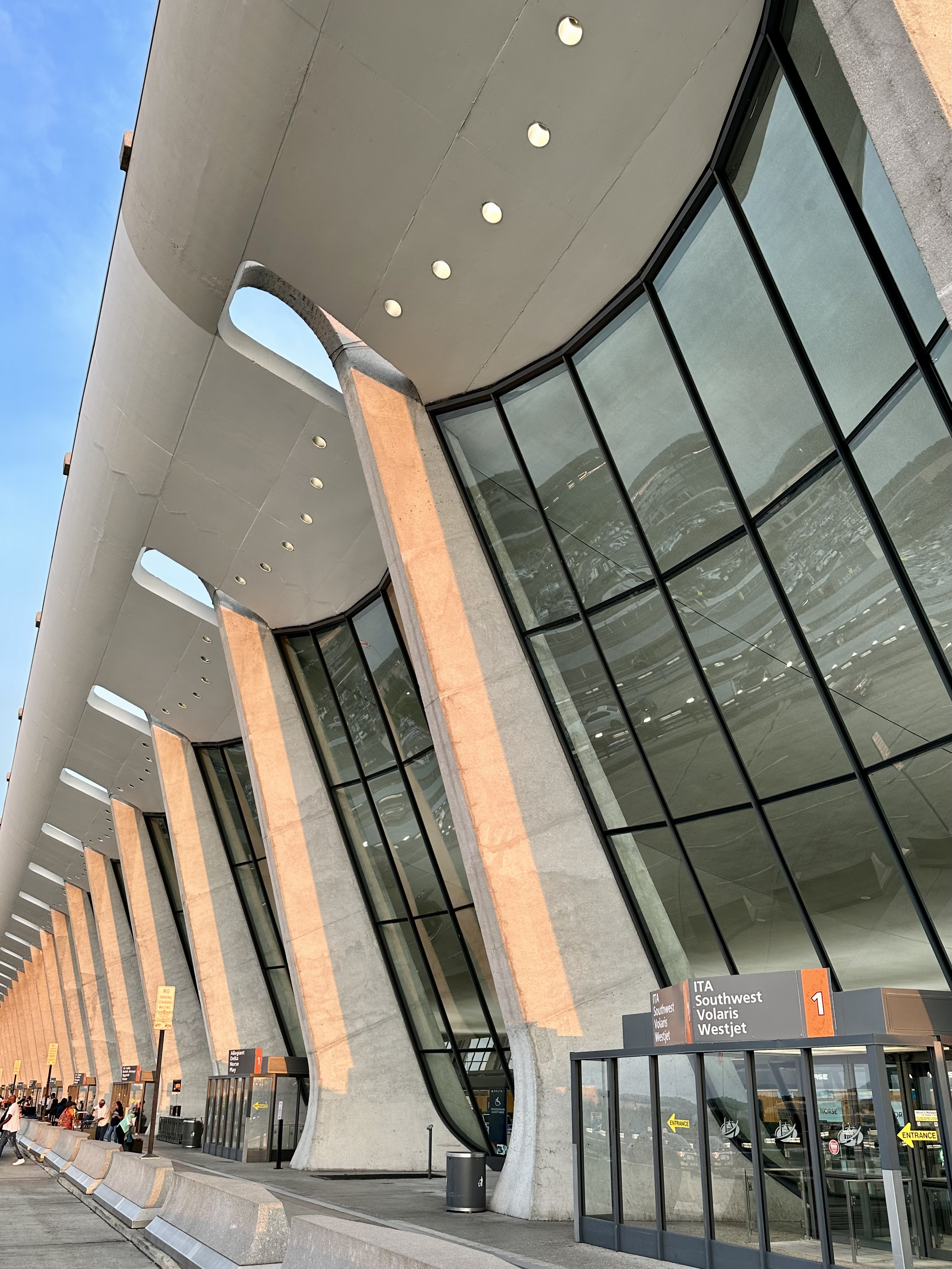
The landside facade (2023)

The expansion plans were renewed in 1976, when the FAA directed Peat, Marwick & Mitchell to revise the airport's master plan. At that point, the terminal expansion was planned to cost $15 million; it was to be part of a $150–190 million overhaul of the airport. The NCPC expressed concerns that the east–west annexes would overshadow the original design, and preservationists advocated for the terminal to be designated as a landmark, restricting changes to the structure. Ultimately, HOK designed two small annexes along the southern facade for additional mobile lounge gates. These annexes measured 50 feet (15 m) wide, about the same as the mobile lounges' lengths, and were built in a similar style to the original terminal. The FAA hired Frank Briscoe Co. in early 1978 to expand the terminal, and work began that September. The same year, the control tower's radome was replaced. The project freed up space in the original terminal for baggage handling, and the FAA awarded a contract to expand the baggage-handling facilities in late 1979. HOK's expansion was completed in 1980. By then, customs facilities had been moved to an adjacent temporary structure with four mobile-lounge bays.

The expansion came just as patronage at Dulles Airport dropped sharply, in part because of the inconvenience of accessing and using the airport. To attract business, the FAA began allowing small planes to load or unload directly at the terminal itself. The FAA rejected plans to add more airline gates to the terminal, citing esthetic concerns and a lack of space. Instead, in 1983, the agency proposed a "midfield concourse" in the middle of the apron, from which passengers could load onto planes directly. The first midfield concourse was hastily built and could be accessed only by the mobile lounges.

=== Master plan expansion ===
==== Mid- and late 1980s ====
In the mid-1980s, as part of a master plan, a consultant recommended doubling the Main Terminal's size, constructing a people-mover to the midfield concourse, and expanding the terminal's airline gates. New vehicular ramps were proposed to alleviate traffic in front of the terminal. The plans also included new facilities for several airlines that used the Main Terminal, along with a separate terminal for international arrivals. The expansions came amid rapid growth in the airport's usage, which neared 4 million by 1984. The master plan was approved by the NCPC in 1986, at which point was expected to cost $420 million. In the meantime, a clinic, baggage claim areas, and stores in the terminal were added, while the international arrivals area was revamped.

The Metropolitan Washington Airports Authority (MWAA) took over Dulles Airport's operation in 1987 and assumed responsibility for the expansion program. David Childs and Marilyn Taylor of Skidmore, Owings & Merrill (SOM) were hired to design a master plan for the terminal, which was rapidly approaching its annual capacity of 13 million passengers. Passengers in the terminal frequently had to wait hours to get their luggage, and the departure boards could not display all the flights. Concessions and security equipment had been installed throughout the years, intruding on the original interior design. Security concerns had also required the mobile-lounge docks on the south facade to be closed; instead, passengers had to undergo X-ray screening, creating a bottleneck.

The MWAA banned smoking inside the terminal in 1988. The same year, to alleviate congestion at the Main Terminal, the MWAA began constructing the international arrivals terminal, which was designed by SOM to the west of the original terminal. The MWAA also developed a satellite facility with a baggage check and duty-free shop in Downtown Washington, D.C., which opened in 1989, further relieving crowding. At that point, the Main Terminal's expansion was scheduled to be completed by early 1994. In the meantime, the MWAA added temporary gates to the terminal, which consisted of semi-trailers; since these trailers were intended as temporary structures, they did not need to undergo a historic-preservation review.

==== 1990s ====
A baggage-claim area was added inside the terminal in 1990, and a federal inspection area at the Main Terminal was enlarged as well. The International Arrivals Terminal opened in 1991, replacing the international-arrivals facilities in the Main Terminal, though the new terminal quickly became overcrowded. The MWAA was also constructing permanent midfield concourses, replacing the temporary annexes on the main building's southern facade. The Main Terminal's annexes were tentatively scheduled to be completed in 1993; the extensions would incorporate a similar curved roof to the original terminal, which would remain visible from the Dulles Access Road. Despite calls by United Airlines officials to halt or delay the proposed expansion, the MWAA decided to proceed with the renovation, the cost of which had risen to $319 million. The control tower's radome was replaced again in 1993.

By 1993, workers had upgraded the airport's utilities to support the terminal's expansion, which was scheduled to be completed in 1996 or 1997. This was planned to be followed in 1998 by the original terminal's interior. By that time, Dulles had over 11 million annual passengers, and airport officials were considering replacing the once-novel mobile lounges with a people mover. Work on the expansion began in October 1993, though MWAA officials were already contemplating further upgrades before work started. To fund the renovation, the MWAA added a passenger facility charge to every ticket, and it issued bonds to cover seven-tenths of the cost. The Main Terminal was lengthened to 1,240 feet (380 m), slightly more than twice the original length, and the vehicular ramps were also expanded. The columns and roofs of the original building were recreated in the annexes, though the annexes' roof cables were prestressed using cranes rather than sandbags. The framework for the eastern extension was finished by late 1995, with the western extension still underway.

United Airlines moved into the eastern annex on July 1, 1996, and the annexes were dedicated on September 6 that year. Afterward, the MWAA announced plans to renovate the original terminal's ceiling, which required asbestos abatement. The MWAA was also relocating the concessions to provide more space for queuing, and it finished replacing the vehicular ramps outside the terminal in 1997. Additional midfield concourses opened in the late 1990s, relieving crowding at the Main Terminal, where queues had frequently doubled back on themselves. At the time, there were proposals for an underground walkway (and, later, a people mover) leading to the midfield concourses. Development of the walkway was delayed after U.S. Senator John McCain withheld congressional funds for the project, stemming from a dispute regarding flights at Washington National Airport.

=== 2000s to present ===
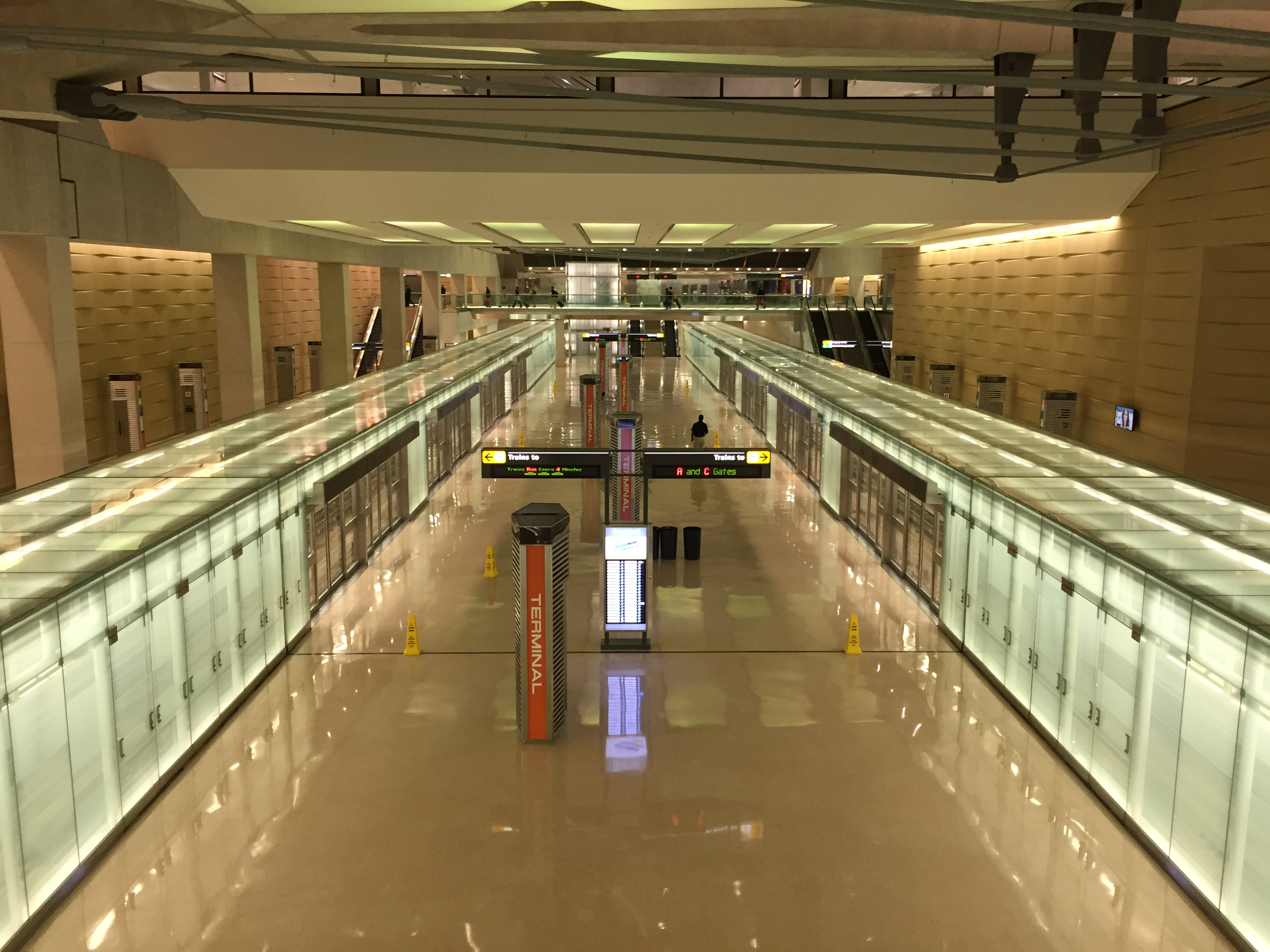
The AeroTrain station in the second basement (2015)

By 2000, there were proposals to renovate the original terminal as part of a $3.4 billion renovation of Dulles Airport. Work on the pedestrian tunnel to concourse B was underway, and several parking garages were being built nearby; in addition, the terminal's control tower was proposed for replacement. An underpass to the new parking garages was completed in 2004 for $81 million, and the tunnel to Concourse B also opened that year. A 600-foot-long (180 m) tunnel for baggage was developed concurrently, and the Z gates opened in 2005. By the mid-2000s, the MWAA was constructing a security checkpoint, along with a people mover (by then known as the AeroTrain) leading to the outlying concourses. This work was budgeted at $1.3 billion and involved constructing two basement levels below the existing facility, freeing up space on the original upper level. The control tower was decommissioned in 2007 after a new control tower opened.

The new security checkpoint in the first basement opened in September 2009, replacing all the checkpoints on the upper level; a checkpoint for frequent travelers was retained on the original lower level. The AeroTrain station in the second basement opened in early 2010, and the airport's overall expansion was completed the next year. Additionally, in 2012, checkpoints were added to the Main Terminal as part of the TSA PreCheck frequent-flyer program, and the MWAA began displaying information on security-screening wait times. The Main Terminal gained direct mass-transit access in 2022 with the opening of Washington Metro's Dulles International Airport station, and an airport lounge sponsored by Capital One opened there the next year.

The MWAA announced another master plan for Dulles Airport in 2025. Renderings of this master plan indicate that a walkway might be built south to midfield concourses A and B. That December, the administration of President Donald Trump solicited proposals for the airport's redevelopment; although Trump praised the terminal's design at the time, he criticized the airport's overall layout. Trump recommended that the Main Terminal's exterior be retained but that the interior be renovated. Twenty-one firms submitted plans the next month, many of which incorporated the Main Terminal. In May 2026, Transportation Secretary Sean Duffy announced a $22 billion expansion of Dulles Airport, as part of which the Main Terminal would be enlarged; the MWAA approved these plans in August. Renderings showed that a new structure would be attached to the center of the Main Terminal and that additional wings would extend from either end.

== Impact ==
=== Reception ===
==== Contemporary ====
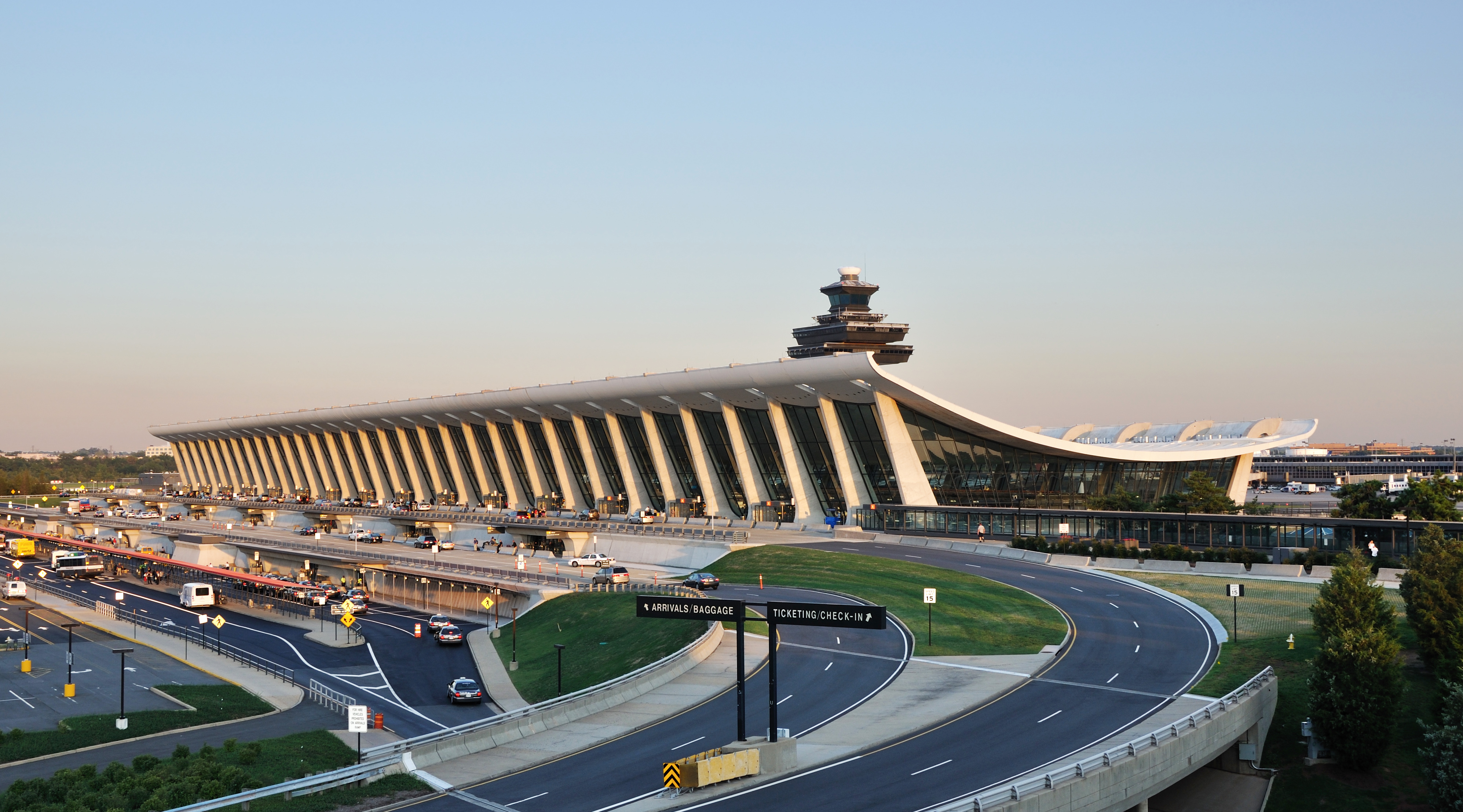
Saarinen had deemed the Dulles Main Terminal "the best thing I have done".

When the terminal was being completed in early 1962, the architectural critic Ada Louise Huxtable described Saarinen as having successfully created "a symbolic entrance to the nation", saying that the design had a similar effect to an ancient Greek temple. The Baltimore Sun wrote that the terminal's design was "vaguely suggestive of some oriental shrine". Paul J. C. Friedlander, of The New York Times, said the swooping roof and slanted glass facade created an effect of "grace and lightness". The commentator Walter McQuade wrote for Architectural Forum: "It is likely that the most majestic single statement of this integrated expressionism will be his design for Dulles Terminal." Saarinen had deemed the Dulles Main Terminal "the best thing I have done"; of the projects he had been working on when he died, he had been especially proud of the Dulles terminal and New York's CBS Building. Saarinen's wife, the architectural critic Aline B. Saarinen, similarly believed the terminal would be her husband's "best work".

Although the Associated Press wrote that the completed terminal "was too modern for many tastes when it was built", the Architectural Record said the building "was almost instantly regarded as a Modern masterpiece". When the terminal opened, Newsday of New York described the building as "definitely a design of the future", and a reporter for the Baltimore Sun said the structure "looks better the closer one gets to it", Architectural Forum, in a 1963 article, wrote that the terminal "happily will never grow into an octopus", referring to the lack of jetways. The Associated Press wrote that the walls, interior lighting, and control tower combined to create "a dreamlike appearance" at night. The architect Cesar Pelli, a former employee of Saarinen's, described the feeling of approaching the Dulles terminal as being similar to that of approaching a "great temple or a great cathedral in the countryside in France".

Several commentators described the concave roof as creating a soaring effect, and they also likened the building to a plane. The Bristol Herald Courier said that "no building of such size ever seemed so likely to take flight", and a Sarasota Journal writer praised the terminal's beauty, saying: "The trouble is, Mr. Saarinen forgot to put in the engines." Wolf Von Eckardt considered the Dulles terminal, along with Boston City Hall, as likely to become "the greatest [building] on the American scene in a decade or two". Conversely, Morris Lapidus wrote for Architecture: The AIA Journal in 1964 that, although the building's exterior was "beautifully bold and daring", the interior lacked scale or embellishing details. The historian Vincent Scully disliked Saarinen's use of "whammo shapes" at the TWA Flight Center and the Dulles Main Terminal, calling the latter "finger-tip insecurity over marshmallow slab".

==== Retrospective ====
Retrospectively, a commentator for the Reporter-Times described early reactions as negative, saying that the local and state governments had only reluctantly accepted Saarinen's design. A New York Times article, conversely, characterized the building as having been perceived "as a bold reflection of American aviation" from the outset. In 1977, when the terminal's expansion was first being considered, a Washington Post writer deemed the terminal Dulles Airport's "one great strength", saying it "looks far more capable of flight" than ordinary aircraft. Upon the terminal's 20th anniversary in 1982, The New York Times wrote that it was "considered by many to be a landmark of 20th-century design". The Washington Post referred to the terminal in 1989 as "inspiring from afar and maddening from within" because of the overcrowding inside. A writer for The Wilson Quarterly wrote in 1995 that the Dulles Main Terminal and the TWA Flight Center demonstrated how Saarinen "push[ed] design beyond the confines of the Modern Movement".

A writer for The New York Times said in 2003 that the Dulles Airport Main Terminal, like Saarinen's nearly-contemporary North Christian Church, "immediately seizes even the casual onlooker's eye with its dramatic shape and carries it heavenward". The next year, the writer Mark Gottdiener praised the exterior as a "dramatic, austere statement" but said that the interior, particularly the inefficiency of the mobile lounges, was inadequate. A 2006 book about Saarinen's architecture said that his design "gave structure an expressive dimension". Roger K. Lewis wrote in 2010 that the terminal had aged well over the years, not only because the interiors were so easily adaptable to different uses, but also because the terminal's design was simple yet memorable. Over the years, the building's design has also evoked comparisons to birds.

View of the terminal at dusk

=== Awards and architectural influence ===
The Greater Washington Board of Trade gave the terminal building an award for its design in 1964, and Saarinen's firm received an honor award from the American Institute of Architects (AIA) in 1966 for the terminal's design. A 1976 poll of American architects ranked it the country's third-best design, tied with Fallingwater, and one of the most impactful buildings constructed in the U.S. since the American Revolution. The Dulles Main Terminal won the AIA's Twenty-five Year Award in 1988. The United States Postal Service issued a stamp depicting the terminal in 1982 to honor Saarinen's designs, and the terminal was also included in the 2013 PBS documentary and companion book 10 Buildings that Changed America.

When the terminal was first expanded in the 1970s, there were calls for the Dulles Main Terminal to be added to the National Register of Historic Places (NRHP). This would have made it one of the youngest-ever NRHP listings, as most NRHP sites cannot be listed until they are at least fifty years old. The FAA initially opposed the NRHP designation, as it would have subjected any potential renovations to a lengthy approval process, but by late 1977 an official declared that "our past intransigence is mellowing." By February 1978, the United States Department of Transportation had requested that the Department of the Interior formally declare the terminal eligible; it was deemed eligible for NRHP listing that month, on the merits of its design. However, the Virginia Historic Landmarks Commission did not submit the nomination. A 2010 Washington Post article stated that the terminal had not been added to the NRHP because of the FAA's concerns that such a designation would disrupt airport operations. (Note: Some sources describe the terminal as having been designated as a landmark.)

When the midfield terminals at Dulles Airport were developed, they were built of glass and metal to avoid drawing attention away from the Main Terminal's concrete structure. The original terminal at Taiwan Taoyuan International Airport in Taoyuan, Taiwan, was modeled after Dulles Airport's Main Terminal; the buildings were so visually similar that the Taiwanese government once erroneously printed passports depicting the Dulles Main Terminal. Other airport terminals drew comparison to the Dulles Main Terminal, including the former passenger terminal at Montréal–Mirabel International Airport and Terminal 2 at San Diego International Airport.

== See also ==
- List of Eero Saarinen works
- List of Skidmore, Owings & Merrill buildings
