= H. George Decancq =

American civilengineer

- Born: March 17, 1901
- Died: March 6, 1990 (aged 88); Rochester, New York, U.S.
- Occupation: Engineer

H. George Decancq (March 17, 1901 – March 6, 1990) was an American civil engineer. He was known for his work of the Verrazzano–Narrows suspension bridge.

Decancq was an engineer at the civil engineering firm Ammann & Whitney. He worked for the Port of New York Authority from 1928 to 1959, before and after his service in the Navy during World War II. He was awarded the Authority's Distinguished Service Medal in 1964.

Decancq died on March 6, 1990 of Parkinson's disease at his home in Rochester, New York, at the age of 88.
