= Mobile lounge =

Bus-like system for boarding and disembarking from aircraft

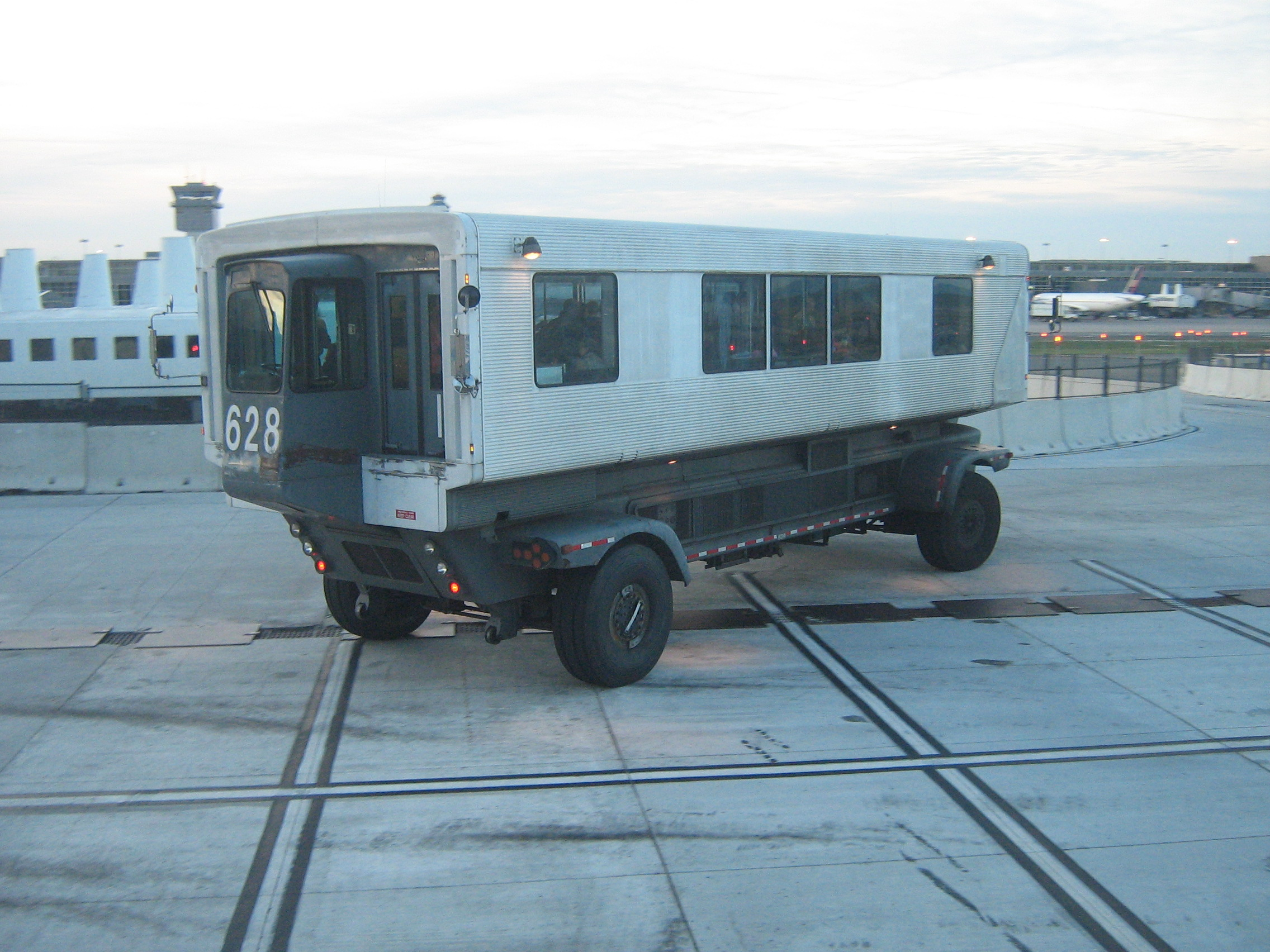
A mobile lounge at Dulles International Airport

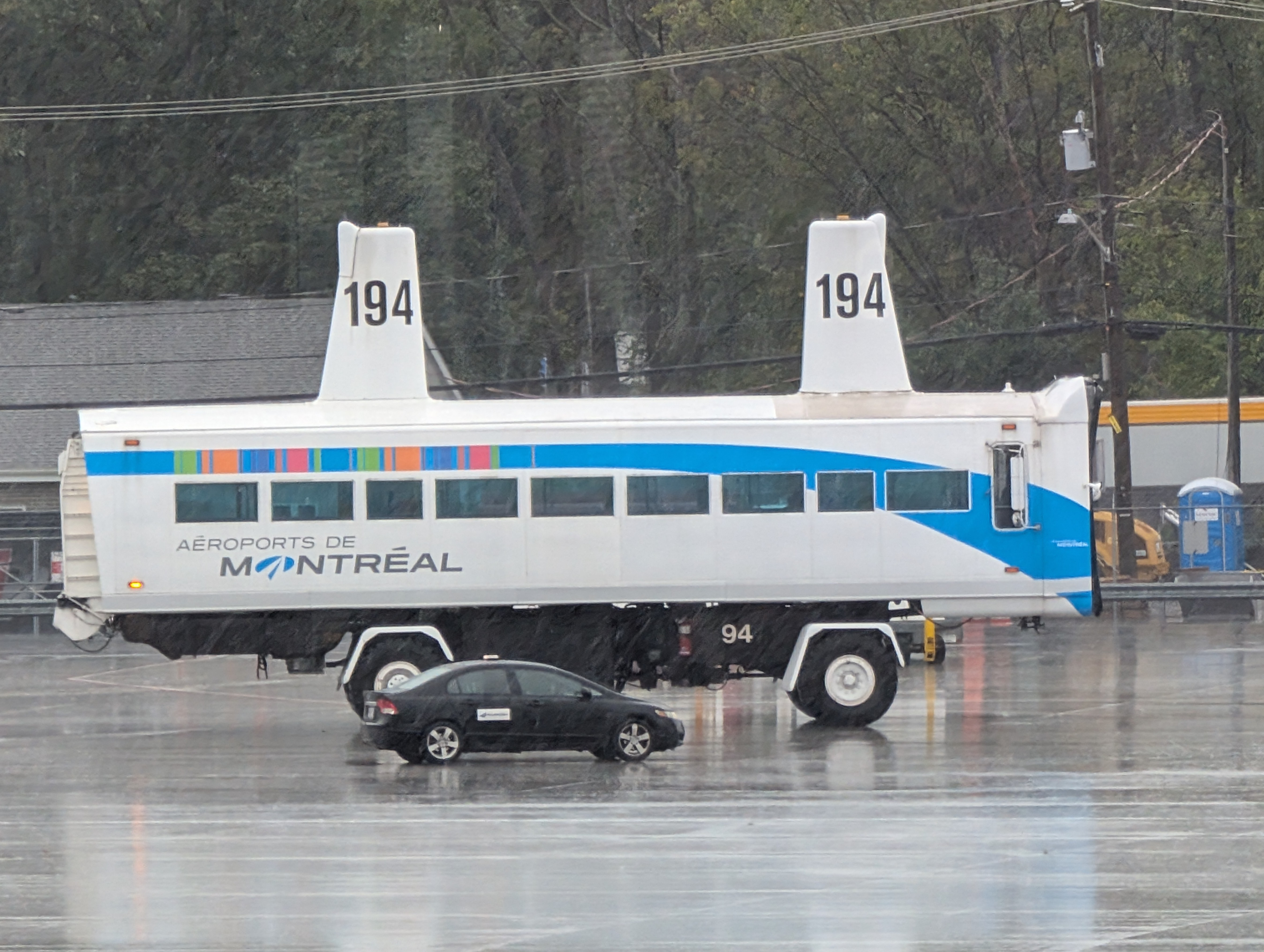
A mobile lounge vehicle in use at Montréal–Trudeau International Airport

A mobile lounge is an elevated bus-like vehicle used for boarding and disembarking from aircraft, or for transportation between terminal buildings at an airport.

== Purpose ==
The mobile lounge was an innovative feature of the main terminal at Dulles International Airport, designed by Eero Saarinen. Saarinen promoted the mobile lounge concept with a short animated film by Charles and Ray Eames. Dulles Airport was the realization of the concepts expressed in the film. Dulles's designers thought that by shuttling from the main terminal directly to a midfield jet ramp, they could save passengers from long walking distances amidst weather, noise, and fumes on the ramp. The advent of the jet bridge and construction of the two midfield concourse buildings at this airport canceled out the benefits of the system.

== Application ==
The mobile lounge is used at Dulles International Airport in the U.S. state of Virginia and at Montréal–Trudeau International Airport in the Canadian province of Quebec. The system was also previously used at Montréal–Mirabel International Airport until passenger services ceased in 2004, John F. Kennedy International Airport's International Terminal in New York City, Baltimore/Washington International Airport in Baltimore, Mexico City International Airport in Mexico City until 2007, Charles de Gaulle Airport in Paris and at King Abdulaziz International Airport in Jeddah, Saudi Arabia until the early 2000s.

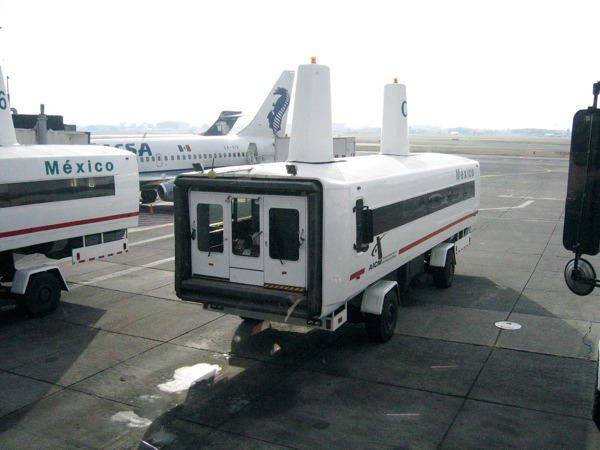
A mobile lounge at Mexico City International Airport

While it is still used at Dulles Airport, the growth in passenger numbers and aircraft capacity made it impractical to use mobile lounges for individual flights. Remote concourses were constructed, and the fleet of mobile lounges was reassigned to operate a shuttle between the concourses and the main terminal. On January 26, 2010, the Metropolitan Washington Airports Authority replaced the Dulles mobile lounge system for passenger movements between the Main Terminal and concourses A, B, and C with the underground AeroTrain. However, some mobile lounges and plane mates remain in use for passenger movements between the main terminal and Concourse D (until the replacement concourses C and D are built and the AeroTrain is built out to run in a continuous two-way loop); to disembark international passengers from all arriving international aircraft (with the exception of United Airlines and certain Star Alliance flights, which are directly served at Concourse C's Federal Inspection Station; and flights from airports with border preclearance) and carry them to the International Arrivals Building; and to convey passengers between the main terminal and aircraft on hard stands (i.e., those parked remotely on the tarmac without access to jet bridges).

PTVs (Passenger Transfer Vehicles) are still in use at the Philadelphia International Airport at Terminals A-East and A-West. The PTVs are utilized to support international flights in A-East and A-West during peak times, when no regular gates are available.

== Variants ==
=== Passenger Transfer Vehicle (PTV) ===
The Passenger Transfer Vehicle or Passenger Transport Vehicle (PTV) (mobile lounge) is a 16.5-by-5-meter carriage mounted on a scissor truck, capable of carrying 102 passengers. These vehicles were designed by the Chrysler Corporation in association with the Budd Company, and are nicknamed "moon buggies" due to their otherworldly appearance. When mobile lounges were first introduced, they had ramps at one end that could be raised or lowered to the floor height of an aircraft. However, after Dulles built the midfield concourses, some of the lounges were retrofitted to be used only for inter-terminal passenger transport. The ramps were removed and doors that could interlock with a terminal building were fitted to either end. Mobile lounges have a driver's cab at each end. The wheels at either end of the lounge can be steered, but the wheels at the end opposite the driver lock into a straight-ahead configuration so that the lounge is steered only by the forward driving wheels.

=== NASA Crew Transport Vehicles ===
Early in the space shuttle program, NASA used the Plane Mate system of mobile lounge to move astronauts directly from the orbiter to crew facilities. A modified vehicle obtained from Baltimore/Washington International Thurgood Marshall Airport in Baltimore, Maryland was used for shuttle landings at Edwards Air Force Base. A similar vehicle was used at the Kennedy Space Center to take astronauts directly from the orbiter to the Operations and Checkout building, where the vehicle was again lifted up for the astronauts to exit directly onto the 2nd floor of the facility.

== Gallery ==
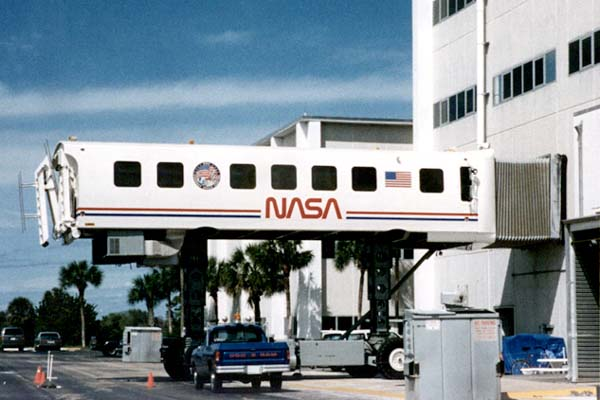
NASA crew transport vehicle docked at data collection facility

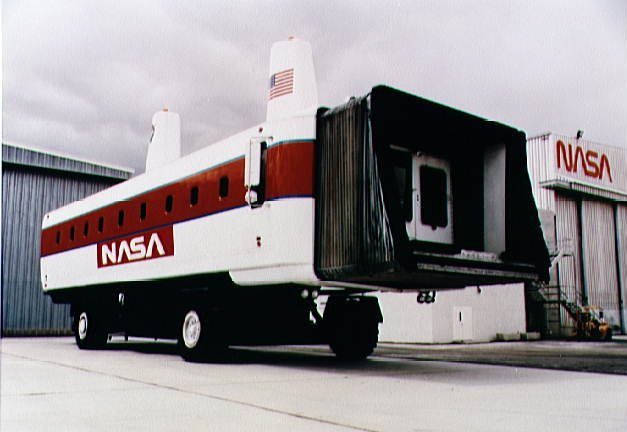
NASA crew transport vehicle used to move space shuttle astronauts from the orbiter

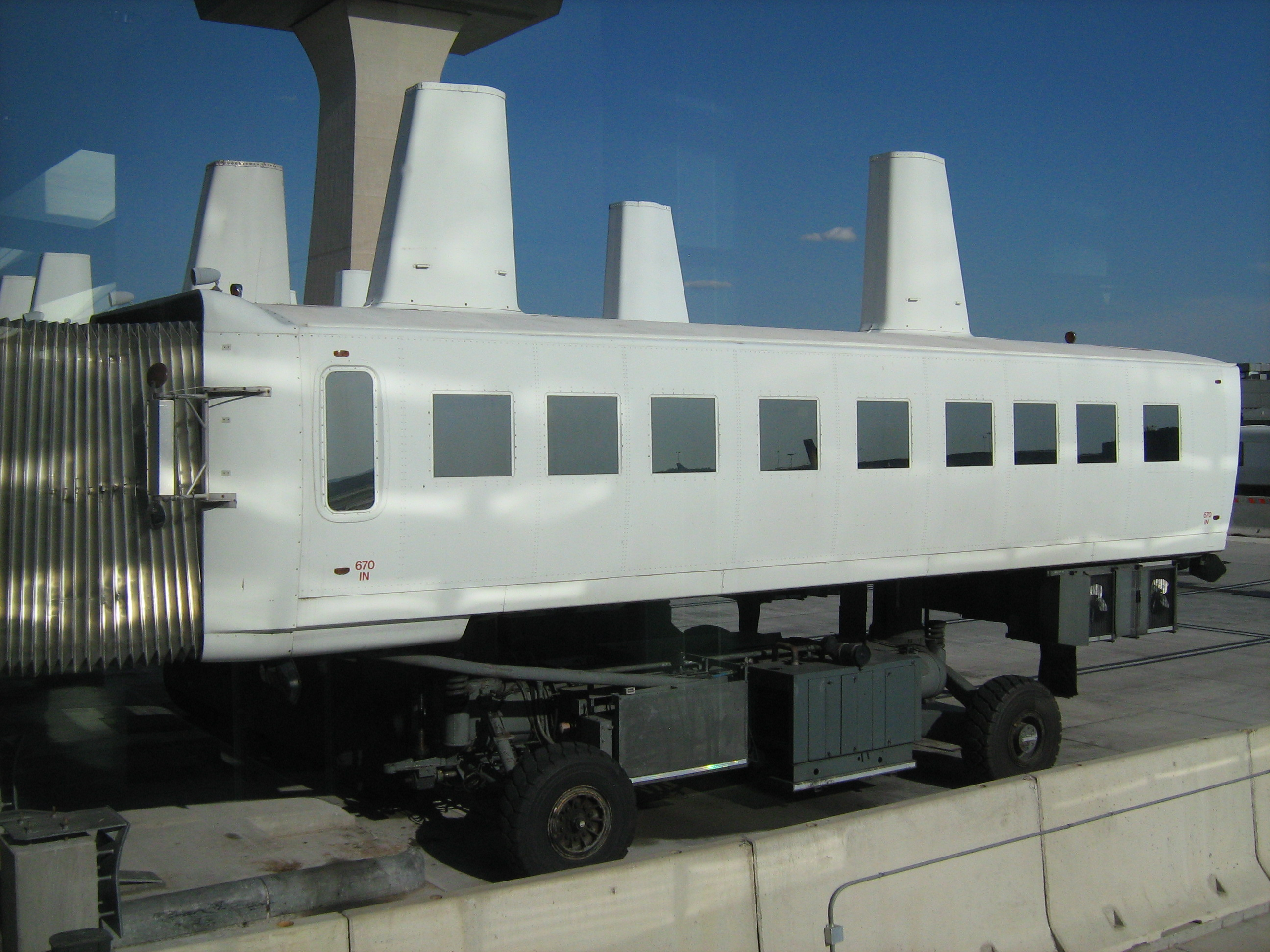
A plane mate at Dulles International Airport

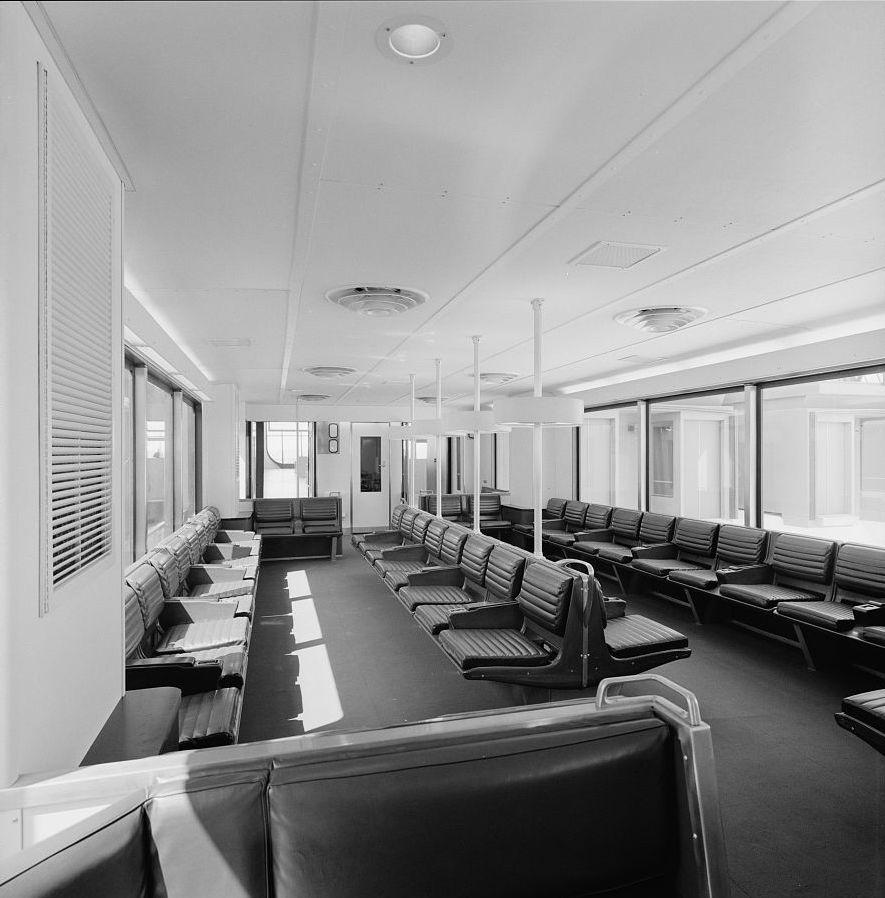
Original interior of a Dulles mobile lounge

== See also ==
- Astronaut transfer van
- Mobile Quarantine Facility
