= Ammann & Whitney =

Architecture and engineering firm

- Type: Private
- Industry: Structural engineering
- Founded: 1946
- Key people: Othmar Herrmann Ammann, Nick Ivanoff
- Number of employees: 250

Ammann & Whitney was a full-service civil engineering firm that provided design and construction services for public and private sector projects. The firm provided new construction, renovations, adaptive reuse, historic preservation, interior design and sustainable design.

In 2016, Ammann & Whitney merged with Louis Berger to form Louis Berger U.S.

== History ==
Ammann & Whitney was founded in 1946 by Othmar Ammann, a bridge designer, and Charles S. Whitney, a designer of innovative structures. Whitney's innovations include collaborations with Eero Saarinen on early thin-shell concrete structures such as Kresge Auditorium (1955), TWA Flight Center (1962), and the main terminal at Dulles International Airport (1962).

Ammann & Whitney has since grown into an international firm. While working with a wide variety of projects including (steel, concrete, masonry and timber) bridges for vehicular, pedestrian and rail traffic, Ammann & Whitney focuses on long span suspension bridges. Examples of the firm's bridge work include the Delaware Memorial Bridge, Walt Whitman Bridge, the General Belgrano Bridge in Argentina, the Throgs Neck Bridge and most notably the Verrazzano–Narrows Bridge.

In July 2016, Ammann & Whitney merged with Louis Berger. It is now Berger's long-span bridge division.

Ammann & Whitney currently has offices on the East Coast of the United States and its headquarters in New York City. There are branch offices in Boston, MA, Philadelphia, PA, Pittsburgh, PA, Richmond, VA, Miami, FL, and Washington, D.C.

== Bridge and Highway Projects ==
New York City

- Bronx-Whitestone Bridge
- Throgs Neck Bridge
- Triborough Bridge
- Verrazzano–Narrows Bridge
- Wards Island Bridge
- George Washington Bridge
- Williamsburg Bridge

Elsewhere

- Bear Mountain Bridge, upstate New York
- Benjamin Franklin Bridge, Philadelphia
- Dragon Bridge, Da Nang City, Vietnam
- Bridge of the Americas, Panama
- Delaware Memorial Bridge between Delaware and New Jersey
- General Belgrano Bridge, Argentina
- Golden Gate Bridge, San Francisco
- Huguenot Bridge, Richmond, Virginia
- Mon/Fayette Expressway, Pittsburgh vicinity
- Roebling Suspension Bridge, between Cincinnati, Ohio, and Covington, Kentucky
- Royal Gorge Bridge, Colorado
- Thomas J. Hatem Memorial Bridge, northeastern Maryland
- Tobin Bridge, Boston, Massachusetts

== Projects ==
Ammann & Whitney projects included:

- Arecibo Radio Telescope, Puerto Rico
- Dulles International Airport Terminal Buildings (including Dulles International Airport Main Terminal)
- TWA Flight Center at JFK International Airport
- Kresge Auditorium
- Queens Museum of Art
- Metropolitan Opera House
