= List of Skidmore, Owings & Merrill buildings =

This list catalogs the work of the architectural firm Skidmore, Owings & Merill. The firm has completed some 10,000 projects.

== List of works ==
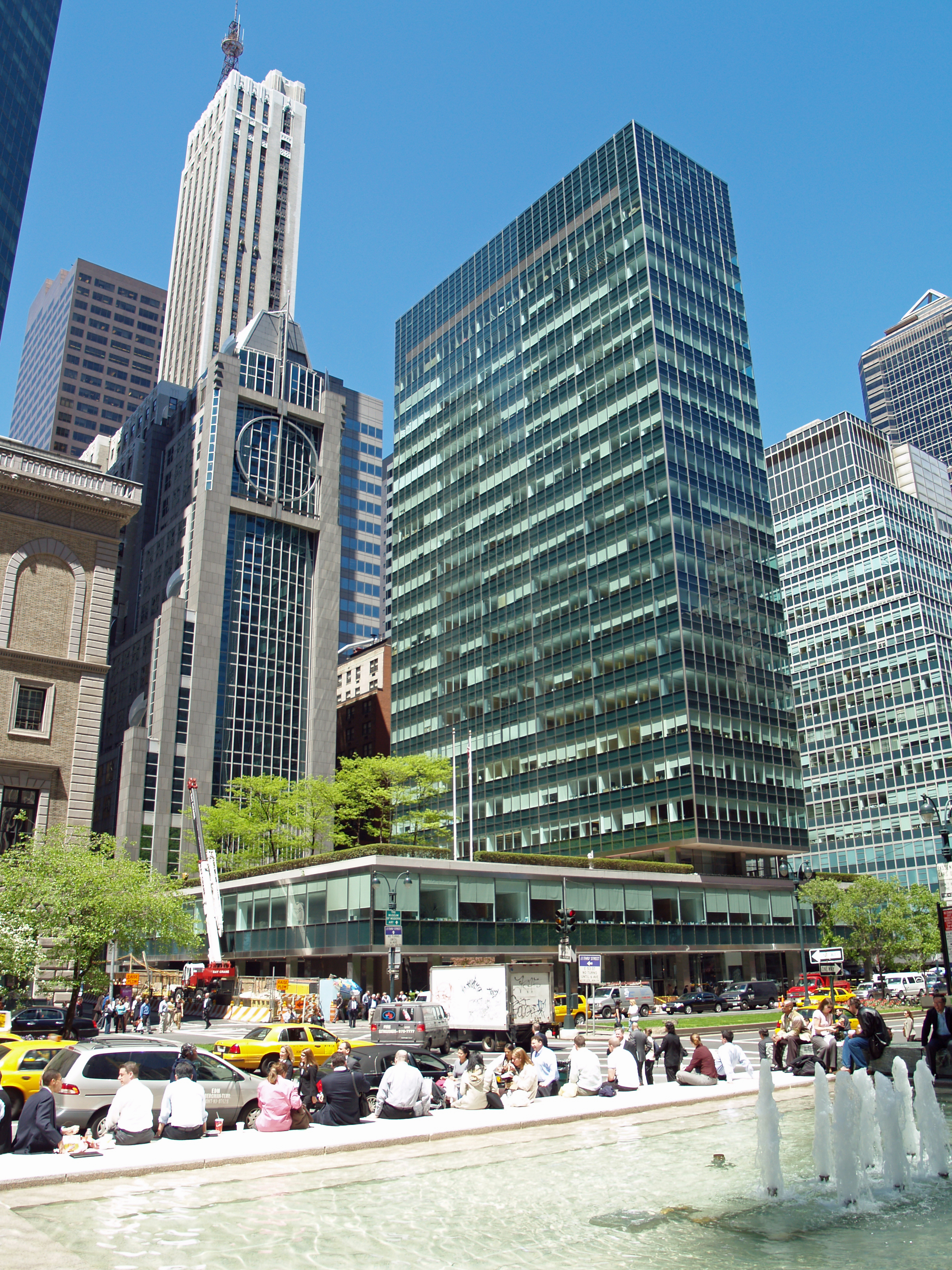
Lever House, 390 Park Avenue, Manhattan

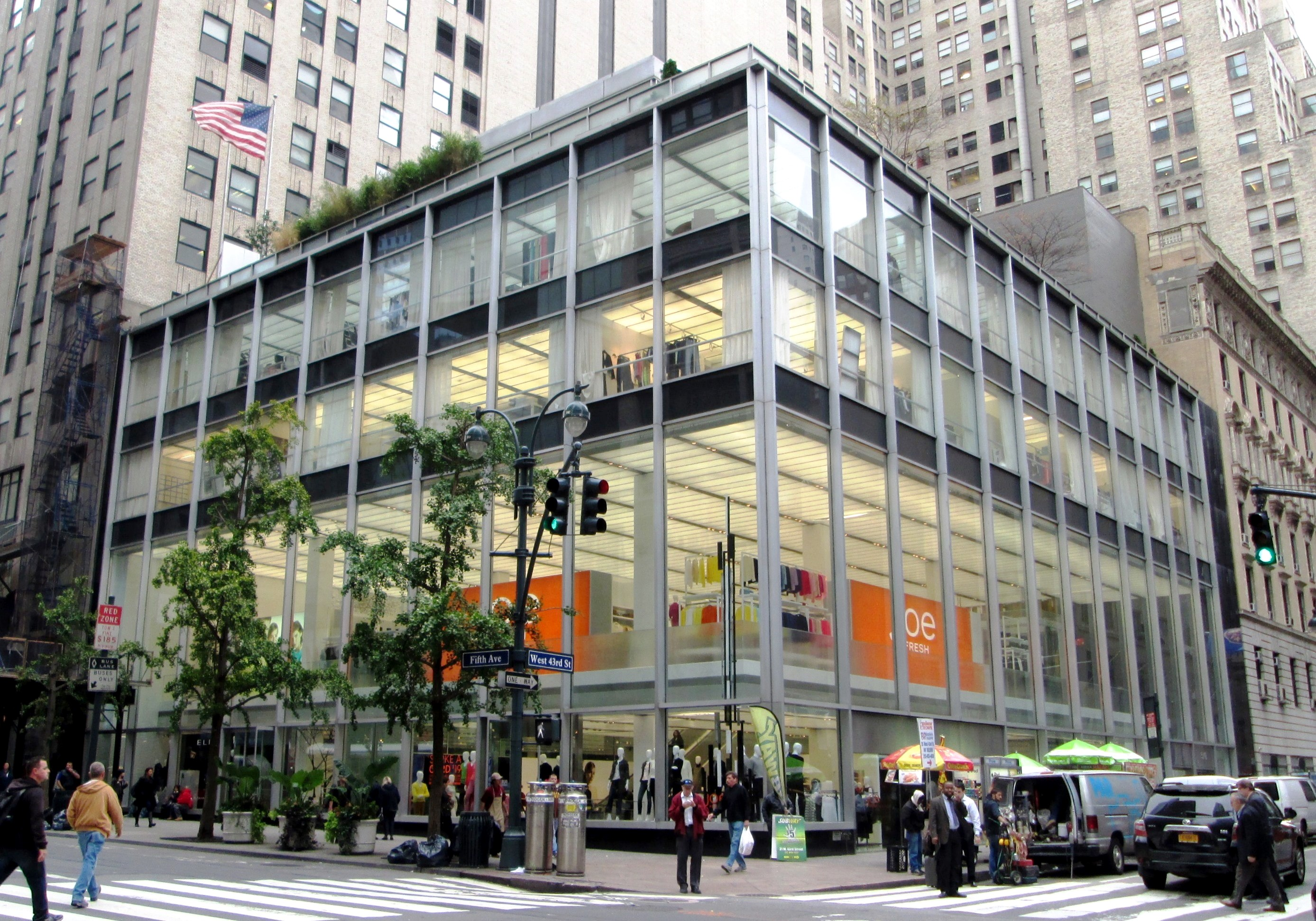
Manufacturers Trust Company Building at 510 Fifth Avenue, Manhattan

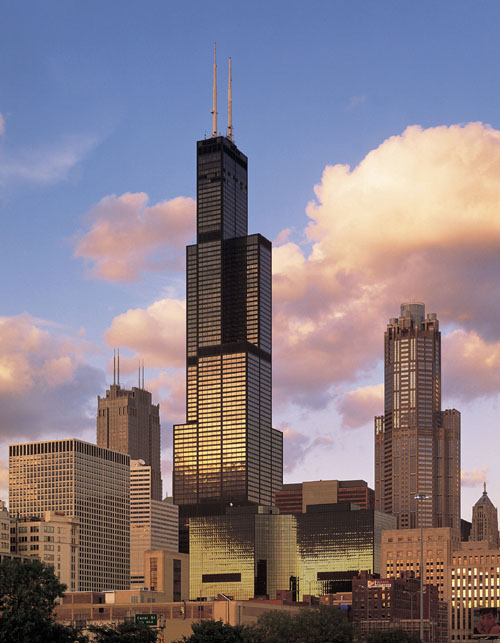
Willis Tower, formerly known as the Sears Tower, in Chicago

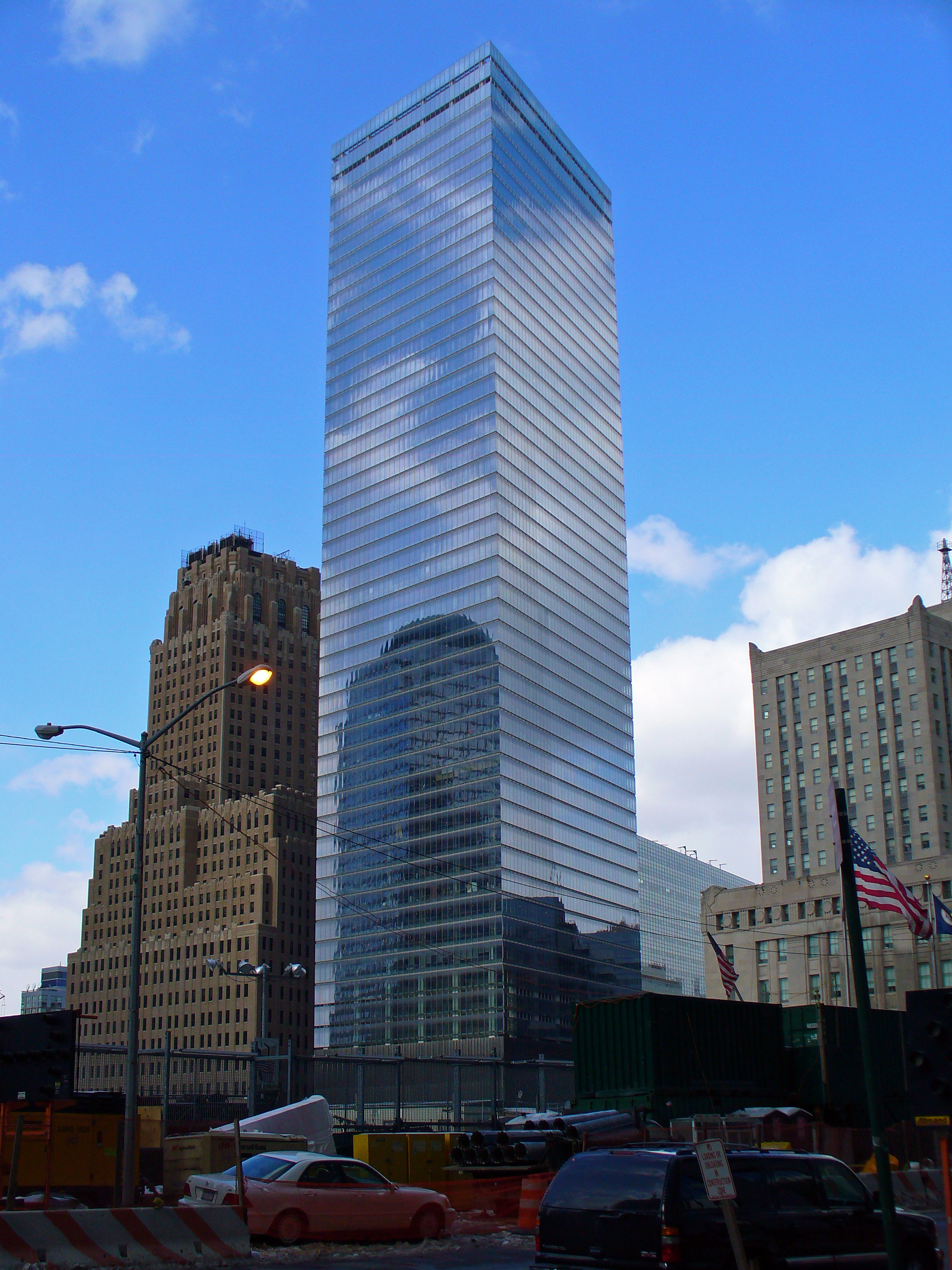
7 World Trade Center, New York City

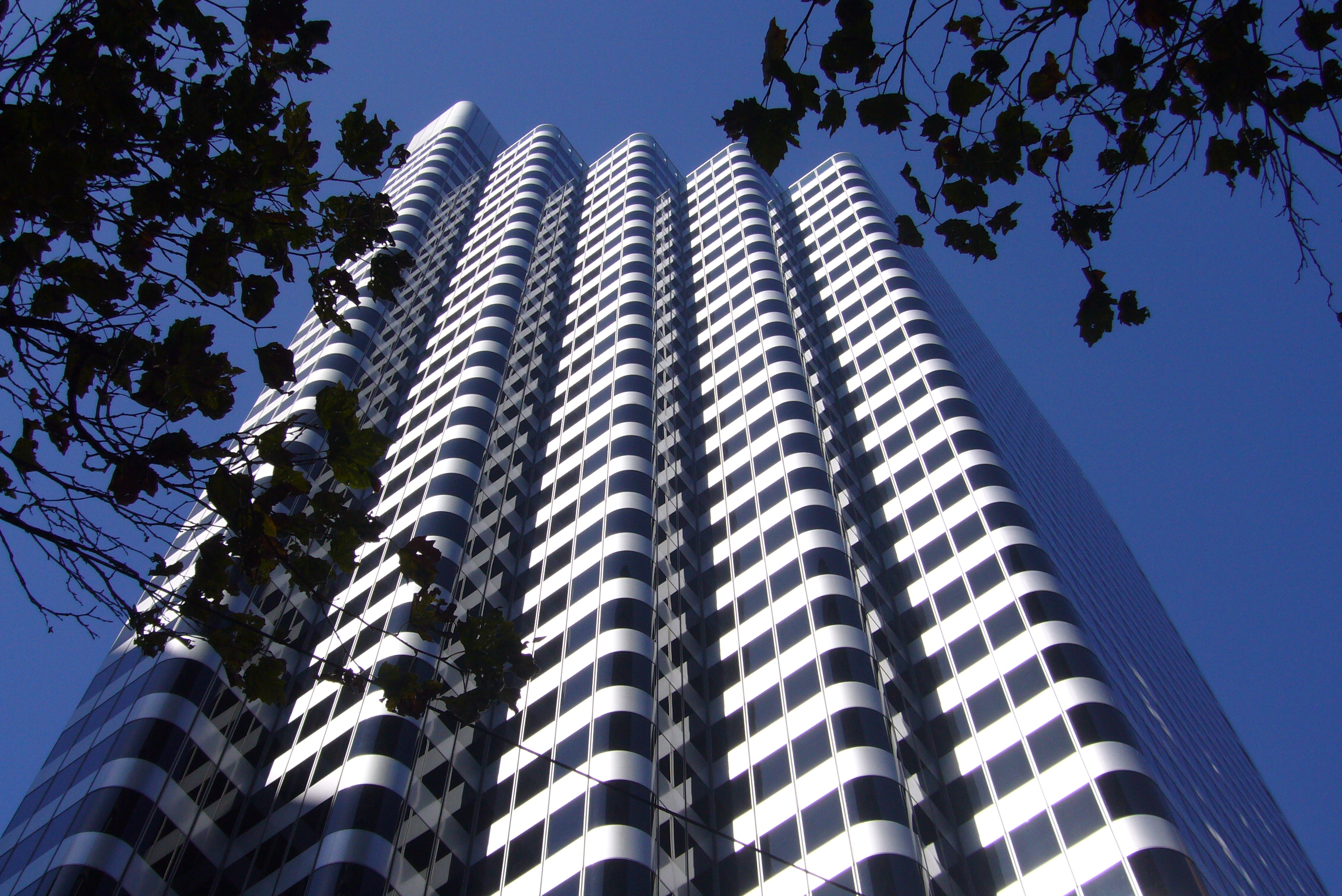
Shaklee Terraces, San Francisco, completed 1979 with a flush aluminum and glass facade and rounded corners.

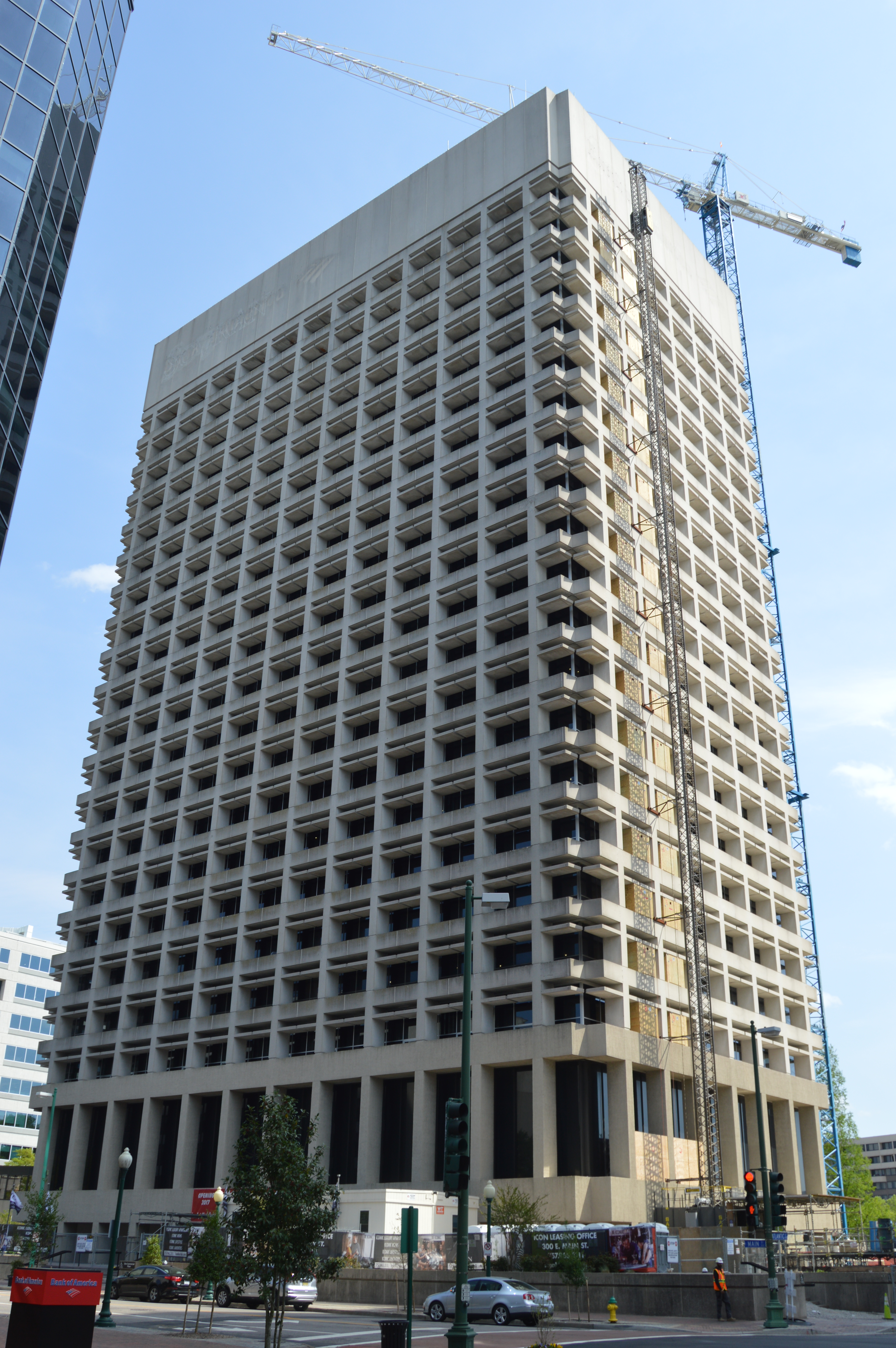
Icon Norfolk luxury apartments, formerly known as Virginia National Bank Headquarters, in Norfolk, Virginia, completed 1967

Project	Location	Completed	Principal architects	Notes
L. S. Ayres flagship, addition 38-40 S. Meridian St.	Indianapolis	1946		part of Washington St–Monument Cir Historic District
Farr Hall	Chicago, Illinois	1948		
Fowler Hall	Chicago, Illinois	1948		
Oak Ridge New Town Master Plan	Oak Ridge, Tennessee	1949	John O. Merrill	
Gunsaulus Hall	Chicago, Illinois	1950		
Manhattan House	Manhattan, New York	1951		New York City Landmark
Lever House	Manhattan, New York	1952	Gordon Bunshaft; Natalie de Blois	New York City Landmark; National Register of Historic Places
Manufacturers Hanover Trust – 510 Fifth Avenue	Manhattan, New York	1954	Gordon Bunshaft; Charles Evans Hughes III	New York City Landmark
Hilton Istanbul Bosphorus	Istanbul, Turkey	1955		Turkey's first five-star hotel.
Consular Agency of the United States, Bremen	Bremen, Germany	1956	Gordon Bunshaft	Received an award in 1974 from the Association of German Architects
International Arrivals Building - John F Kennedy International Airport	Queens New York	1957		Demolished 2000
Inland Steel Building	Chicago	1958	Bruce Graham; Walter Netsch	Chicago Landmark
United Airlines terminal - John F Kennedy International Airport	Queens New York	1959		Demolished 2008
Veterans Memorial Coliseum	Portland, Oregon	1960		Also known as Portland Memorial Coliseum.
One Chase Manhattan Plaza	Manhattan, New York	1961		New York City Landmark
Hermann Hall	Chicago, Illinois	1962	Walter Netsch	Part of Illinois Institute of Technology Academic Campus
Galvin Library	Chicago, Illinois	1962	Walter Netsch	Part of Illinois Institute of Technology Academic Campus
BMA Tower	Kansas City, Missouri	1961	Bruce Graham	Also known as One Park Place.
Telus Tower	Montreal	1962	Gordon Bunshaft	French: Tour Telus. Previously known as CIL House.
McMath–Pierce solar telescope at Kitt Peak National Observatory	Kitt Peak, Arizona	1962		
John Hancock Mutual Life Insurance Building	New Orleans, Louisiana	1962	Gordon Bunshaft	Currently K&B Plaza Replaced Lee Circle Main Library, New Orleans Public Library (Daniel Burnham, 1908)
Beinecke Rare Book and Manuscript Library at Yale University	New Haven, Connecticut	1963	Gordon Bunshaft	
United States Air Force Academy Cadet Chapel	Colorado Springs, Colorado	1963		
Cook County Administration Building (formerly the Brunswick Building)	Chicago	1964		
Mauna Kea Beach Hotel	Kohala, Hawaii, Hawaii	1965	Edward Charles Bassett	
Circle Campus of the University of Illinois at Chicago	Chicago	1965		
Wentworth Hotel	Sydney, New South Wales, Australia	1966	John Barney Rodgers	Designed in association with Laurie & Heath. City of Sydney local heritage item.
One Wilshire	Los Angeles	1966		
Keating Hall	Chicago, Illinois	1966	Myron Goldsmith	Part of Illinois Institute of Technology Academic Campus
Robert A. Pritzker Science Center / Life Sciences Building	Chicago, Illinois	1966	Myron Goldsmith	Part of Illinois Institute of Technology Academic Campus
Autzen Stadium of the University of Oregon	Eugene, Oregon	1967		
Virginia National Bank Headquarters Historic District	Downtown Norfolk, Virginia	1967		Later known as Bank of America Center. As of 2018, the tower is Icon Norfolk, a luxury apartment building.
Louis Jefferson Long Library at Wells College	Aurora, New York	1968		
Equitable Building	Atlanta	1968		
John T. Rettaliata Engineering Center / Engineering I Building	Chicago, Illinois	1968	Myron Goldsmith	Part of Illinois Institute of Technology Academic Campus
D90 (Boots Headquarters)	Beeston, Nottinghamshire, United Kingdom	1968		Grade II* listed
University of Illinois at Chicago – Phase III: Behavioral Sciences Building	Chicago	1969		
555 California Street	San Francisco	1969		Formerly Bank of America Center.
Grand Rapids City Hall & Kent County Administrative Building	Grand Rapids, Michigan	1969		
John Hancock Center	Chicago	1969		
Red Line – Dan Ryan branch	Chicago	1969	Myron Goldsmith	
Blue Line – O'Hare branch (Jefferson Park to Logan Square)	Chicago	1970	Myron Goldsmith	
Regenstein Library of the University of Chicago	Chicago	1970		
Boise Plaza	Boise, Idaho	1971		Originally the Boise Cascade Building
Stuart Hall	Chicago, Illinois	1971	Myron Goldsmith	Part of Illinois Institute of Technology Academic Campus
The Republic Newspaper Office	Columbus, Indiana	1971	Myron Goldsmith	
Lyndon Baines Johnson Library and Museum	Austin, Texas	1971		
Seneca One Tower	Buffalo, New York	1971		
Weyerhaeuser Headquarters	Tacoma, Washington	1971		
Gund Hall (School of Law)	Cleveland, Ohio	1971	John O. Merrill	Constructed as a pair of buildings -- library and offices, and lecture halls / moot courts
Hajj Terminal at King Abdulaziz International Airport	Jeddah, Saudi Arabia	1972		
Hancock Whitney Center	New Orleans, Louisiana	1972		Originally One Shell Square
Olympic Tower	Manhattan, New York	1972		
Willis Tower (formerly Sears Tower)	Chicago, Illinois	1973	Bruce Graham; Fazlur Khan	
Carlton Centre	Johannesburg, South Africa	1973		
U.S. Bank Center	Milwaukee	1973	Bruce Graham; James DeStefano; Fazlur Khan	
Edmonton City Centre	Edmonton, Alberta	1974		Formerly Edmonton Centre.
First Wisconsin Plaza	Madison, Wisconsin	1974		
Azadi Stadium	Tehran, Iran	1974		
Tour Areva	La Défense, Courbevoie, France	1974		
Hirshhorn Museum and Sculpture Garden	Washington, D.C.	1974	Gordon Bunshaft	Interior renovations in 2020s also overseen by SOM
City Center Square	Kansas City, Missouri	1977		
555 17th Street	Denver	1978		Formerly Anaconda Tower and Qwest Tower.
Denver World Trade Center	Denver	1979		
Town Square Complex	Saint Paul, Minnesota	1980		Contains the Bremer Tower, UBS Plaza, and DoubleTree by Hilton St. Paul Downtown
Marriott World Trade Center	Manhattan, New York	1981		Also known as 3 World Trade Center. Destroyed in the September 11 attacks in 2001.
U.S. Bank Plaza	Minneapolis, Minnesota	1981	Skidmore, Owings & Merrill	Former Pillsbury Company headquarters.
Madison Plaza	Chicago	1982		Former Hyatt Corporation headquarters.
Enerplex, North Building	Princeton, New Jersey	1982		
Hubert H. Humphrey Metrodome	Minneapolis	1982		Demolished in 2014.
AT&T Midtown Center	Atlanta	1982		Formerly BellSouth Center and Southern Bell Center.
Georgia-Pacific Tower	Atlanta	1982		
The Terraces at 801 South Plymouth Court	Chicago	1983		
Wells Fargo Center	Los Angeles	1983		
U.S. Bancorp Tower	Portland, Oregon	1983		Nicknamed Big Pink.
National Commercial Bank Headquarters	Jeddah, Saudi Arabia	1983		
10 Universal City Plaza	Los Angeles	1984		Universal Studios, Inc. headquarters
Université saad dahleb, blida	Blida, Algeria	1984	Skidmore	Université de Blida 1
Trammell Crow Center	Dallas	1984		
Republic Plaza	Denver	1984		
Fort Wayne Museum of Art	Fort Wayne, Indiana	1984		
Southeast Financial Center	Miami	1984		
1515 Poydras	New Orleans	1984		Former Gulf Building
63 Building	Seoul, South Korea	1985		In Yeouido.
Wachovia Tower	Birmingham, Alabama	1986		
McCormick Place - Phase 2 - Exposition Center Expansion North Building	Chicago	1986		
Cannoneer Court at Pratt Institute	Brooklyn, New York	1986		
Wells Fargo Tower	Birmingham, Alabama	1987		Previously known as SouthTrust Tower and Wachovia Tower.
321 North Clark	Chicago	1987		
Chase Tower	Dallas	1987		Also known as JPMorgan Chase Tower and Texas Commerce Tower. Nicknamed Keyhole Building.
Leo J. Pantas Hall at Pratt Institute	Brooklyn, New York	1987		
SunTrust Center	Orlando, Florida	1988		Tallest building in Orlando
NBC Tower	Chicago	1989		
One Worldwide Plaza	Manhattan, New York	1989	David Childs	
461 Fifth Avenue	Manhattan, New York	1989		
Milwaukee Center	Milwaukee	1989		
Roosevelt Hospital	Manhattan, New York	1990		
Islamic Cultural Center of New York	Manhattan, New York	1991		
100 East Pratt Street	Baltimore	1992		
Brookfield Place	Toronto	1992	Bregman + Hamann Architects	
Hong Kong Convention and Exhibition Centre	Hong Kong	1997		
Kirchsteigfeld	Kirchsteigfeld, Germany	1997		
Terminal 3 of Ninoy Aquino International Airport	Manila, Philippines	1997		
Sioux City Art Center	Sioux City, Iowa	1997		
MEO Arena	Lisbon, Portugal	1998		Formerly Pavilhão Atlântico (Atlantico Pavilion).
Jin Mao Tower	Shanghai, China	1999		
Embassy of the United States, Ottawa	Ottawa	1999	Gary Haney; David Childs	
Korea World Trade Center Expansion	Seoul, South Korea	2000		
PBCom Tower	Makati, Philippines	2000		Second-tallest building in the Philippines.
7 South Dearborn	Chicago			Planned but never built.
Adelaide Convention Centre	Adelaide, Australia	2001		
John F. Kennedy International Airport, International Arrivals Building, Terminal 4	Queens, New York	2001	Marilyn Jordan Taylor	Replaced original International Arrivals Building
International Terminal at San Francisco International Airport	San Francisco	2001	Craig W. Hartman	
Dallas Convention Center	Dallas	2002		
Time Warner Center	Manhattan, New York	2003		
Random House Tower	Manhattan, New York	2003		
Terminal 3 of Ben Gurion Airport	Tel Aviv, Israel	2004	Marilyn Jordan Taylor	In association with Moshe Safdie.
Rondo 1	Warsaw, Poland	2005		Also known as Rondo ONZ.
10 Exchange Square	London, United Kingdom	2004		
Finsbury Avenue Square	London, United Kingdom	2004		
Samsung Tower Palace 3 – Tower G	Seoul, South Korea	2004		In partnership with Samoo Architects & Engineers
Terminal 1 of Toronto Pearson International Airport	Toronto	2004		In association with Adamson Associates Architects, and Moshe Safdie & Associates
Jianianhua Centre	Chongqing, China	2005		
AIG Tower	Hong Kong	2005		
New Providence Wharf	London, United Kingdom	2006		
7 World Trade Center	Manhattan, New York	2006		
Tokyo Midtown	Tokyo, Japan	2007		
Dublin Airport	Dublin, Ireland	2007		
Terminal 3 of Singapore Changi Airport	Singapore	2007	Marilyn Jordan Taylor	In partnership with CPG Corporation.
101 Warren Street	Manhattan, New York	2007		
Esentai Tower	Almaty, Kazakhstan	2008		
Cathedral of Christ the Light	Oakland, California	2008		
Centennial Towers	San Francisco	2008		
Chemsunny Plaza	Beijing, China	2008		
University of Utah Campus Master Plan	Salt Lake City	2008		
222 Main	Salt Lake City	2009		
Trump International Hotel and Tower	Chicago	2009		
Pan Peninsula	London, United Kingdom	2009		
Al Rajhi Bank Headquarters	Riyadh, Saudi Arabia	2009		
Burj Khalifa	Dubai, United Arab Emirates	2010		
Nanjing Greenland Financial Center	Nanjing, China	2010		
China World Trade Center Tower III	Beijing, China	2010		
Al Hamra Tower	Kuwait City, Kuwait	2011		
John Jay College of Criminal Justice	Manhattan, New York	2011	Marilyn Jordan Taylor	
510 Fifth Avenue	Manhattan, New York	2012		Renovation and adaptive reuse.
University of North Carolina Genome Science Lab	Chapel Hill, North Carolina	2012		
Zuellig Building	Makati, Philippines	2012		
Chongqing Rural Commercial Bank Financial Building	Chongqing, China	2012		
Dallas City Performance Hall	Dallas	2012		
One World Trade Center	Manhattan, New York	2013		
Pearl River Tower	Guangzhou, China	2013		
KAFD Conference Center at King Abdullah Financial District	Riyadh, Saudi Arabia	2014		
Chhatrapati Shivaji International Airport Terminal 2	Mumbai, India	2014		
The New School University Center	Manhattan, New York	2014		
United States Air Force Academy; Center for Character & Leadership Development	Colorado Springs, Colorado	2014		
NATO Headquarters	Brussels, Belgium	2015		
OKO Tower	Moscow, Russia	2015		
Poly International Plaza	Beijing, China	2015		
Tanjong Pagar Centre	Singapore	2016		Tallest building in Singapore
Lexicon Tower (aka Chronicle Tower)	London, United Kingdom	2017		residential building
Talan Towers	Astana, Kazakhstan	2017		
Greenland Hangzhou Center	Hangzhou, China	2023		mixed-use complex
Hangzhou Wangchao Center	Hangzhou, China	2023		mixed-use complex
Kempegowda International Airport Terminal 2	Bangalore, India	Ongoing		
1865 Broadway	Manhattan, New York	Ongoing		SOM designed the original structure, which was demolished in 2015, and the taller replacement tower, which will be completed in 2019.
RDO Building	Fargo, North Dakota	2020 (Estimated)		Expected to be North Dakota's 2nd tallest building.
Catalinas Rio	Buenos Aires, Argentina	2024 (Ongoing)		
Masters Tower Cebu	Cebu City, Philippines	2025 (ongoing)		
