= AeroTrain (Dulles International Airport) =

Underground people mover system

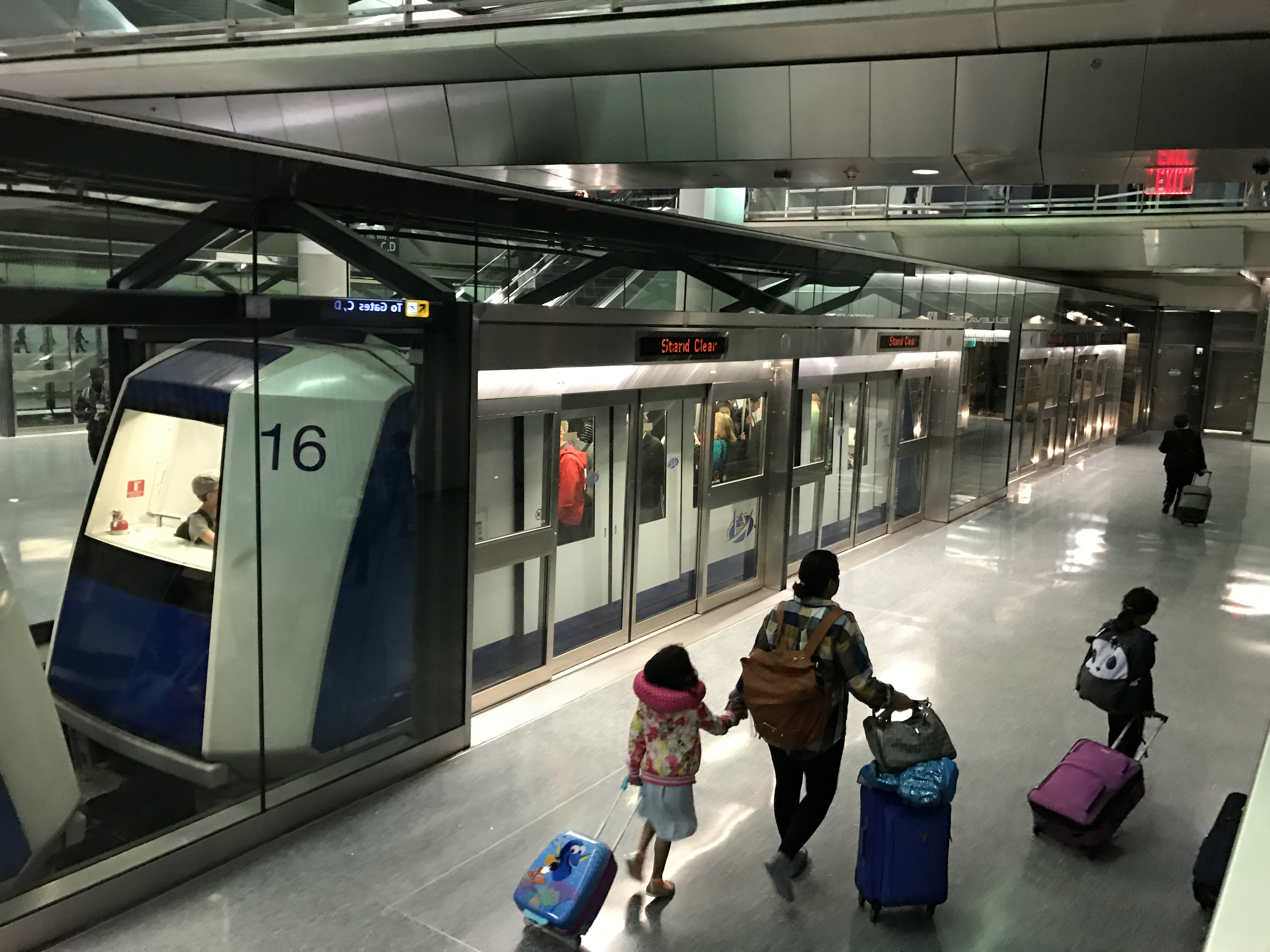

Overview
- Locale: Dulles International Airport serving Washington, D.C.
- Termini: Concourse B; Concourse E
- Stations: 4

Service
- Type: People mover
- Services: 1
- Operator: Metropolitan Washington Airports Authority
- Rolling stock: 29 Mitsubishi Heavy Industries Crystal Mover vehicles

History
- Opened: January 20, 2010; 16 years ago (employees); January 26, 2010; 16 years ago (passengers)

Technical
- Line length: 3.78 mi (6.08 km)
- Character: Fully underground; serves sterile parts of the airport
- Operating speed: 42 mph (68 km/h)

AeroTrain is a 3.78-mile (6.08 km) underground automated people mover system at Dulles International Airport, in Dulles, Virginia, United States.

== Description ==
The AeroTrain transports passengers between the Main Terminal Building and Concourses A, B, and C. From the Main Terminal Station, trains travel to Concourse A and Concourse C in one direction, and to Concourse B in the other direction. The track map for AeroTrain is shaped like a question mark, with the Main Terminal Station at the top. The AeroTrain runs four trains consisting of three cars from 5:00 AM to around 3:00 PM, after which seven three-car trains run from 3:00 PM until 11:00 PM. From midnight to 5 AM, there are fewer trains.

There is supposed to be a maximum headway of two minutes between trains. The trains transport passengers to the concourses in about two minutes, at 40–42 miles per hour (64–68 km/h); the mobile lounges travel about 15 miles per hour (24 km/h).

The AeroTrain is equipped with Thales SelTrac Communications-based train control (CBTC) moving block signaling system. The AeroTrain's rolling stock consists of 29 Mitsubishi Heavy Industries Crystal Mover vehicles.

== History ==
The AeroTrain system was scheduled to open in fall 2009, but was delayed until 2010 in order to complete reliability tests. It opened to Dulles employees on January 20, 2010, and to passengers on January 26, 2010. The system mostly replaced the mobile lounges which transport passengers from the concourses to the Main Terminal. The system cost about $1.4 billion, and the project also included the construction of a new security screening mezzanine.

Since the existing Concourse C/D (built in 1985 and renovated in 2006 to extend its life for 8-10 more years) is a temporary concourse, the Concourse C/D station has been built at the site of the future permanent Concourse E, and is connected to the existing concourse by an underground walkway.

== Future ==
There are plans for future expansion of the system. The AeroTrain can be expanded to include stations for the future Concourse D, two stations for an additional midfield Concourse (Concourses E and F), and a South Terminal.

Once fully built out, the trains will run in a two-way loop around the airside of the airport.

== Gallery ==
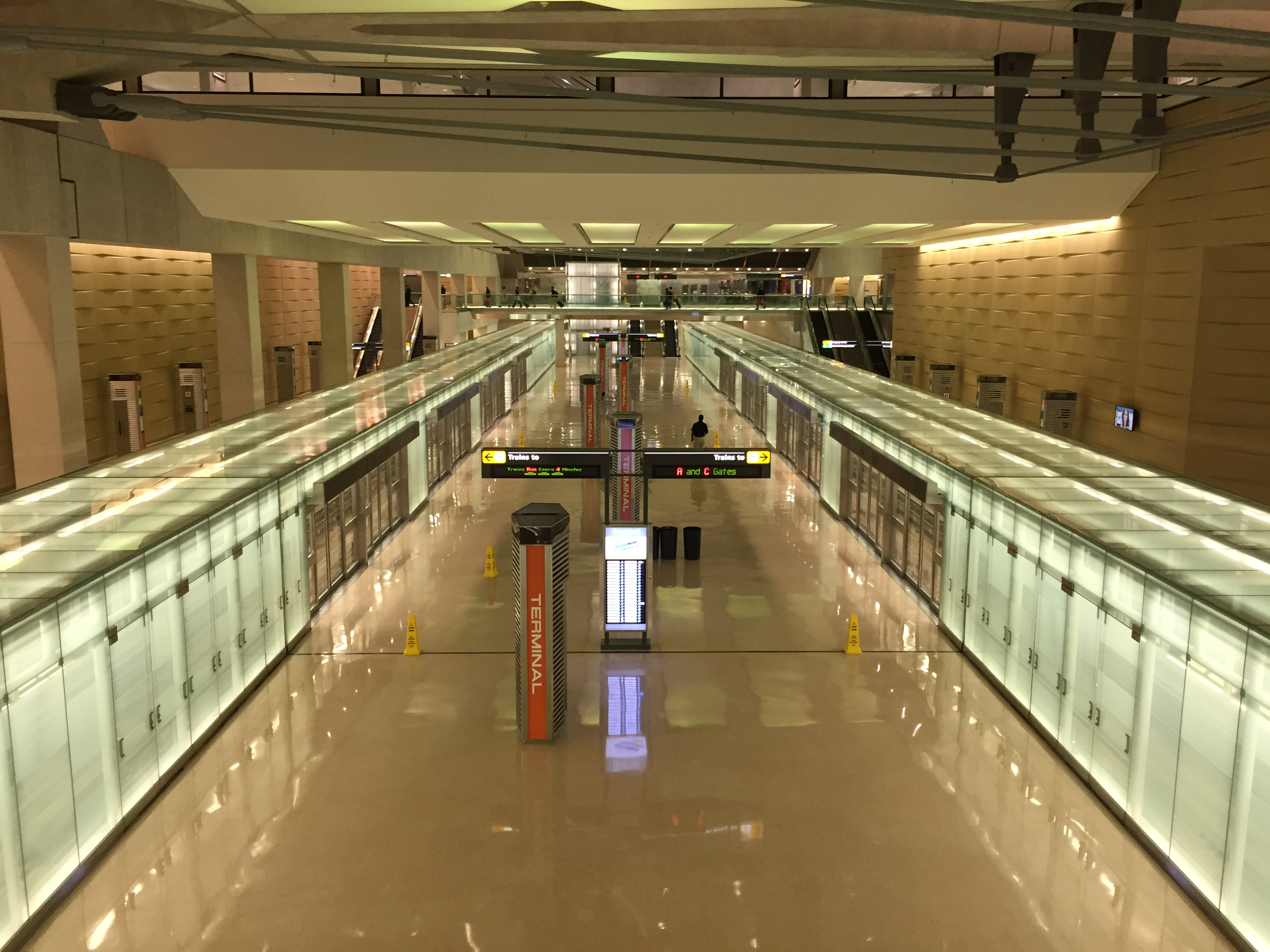
Main Terminal Station

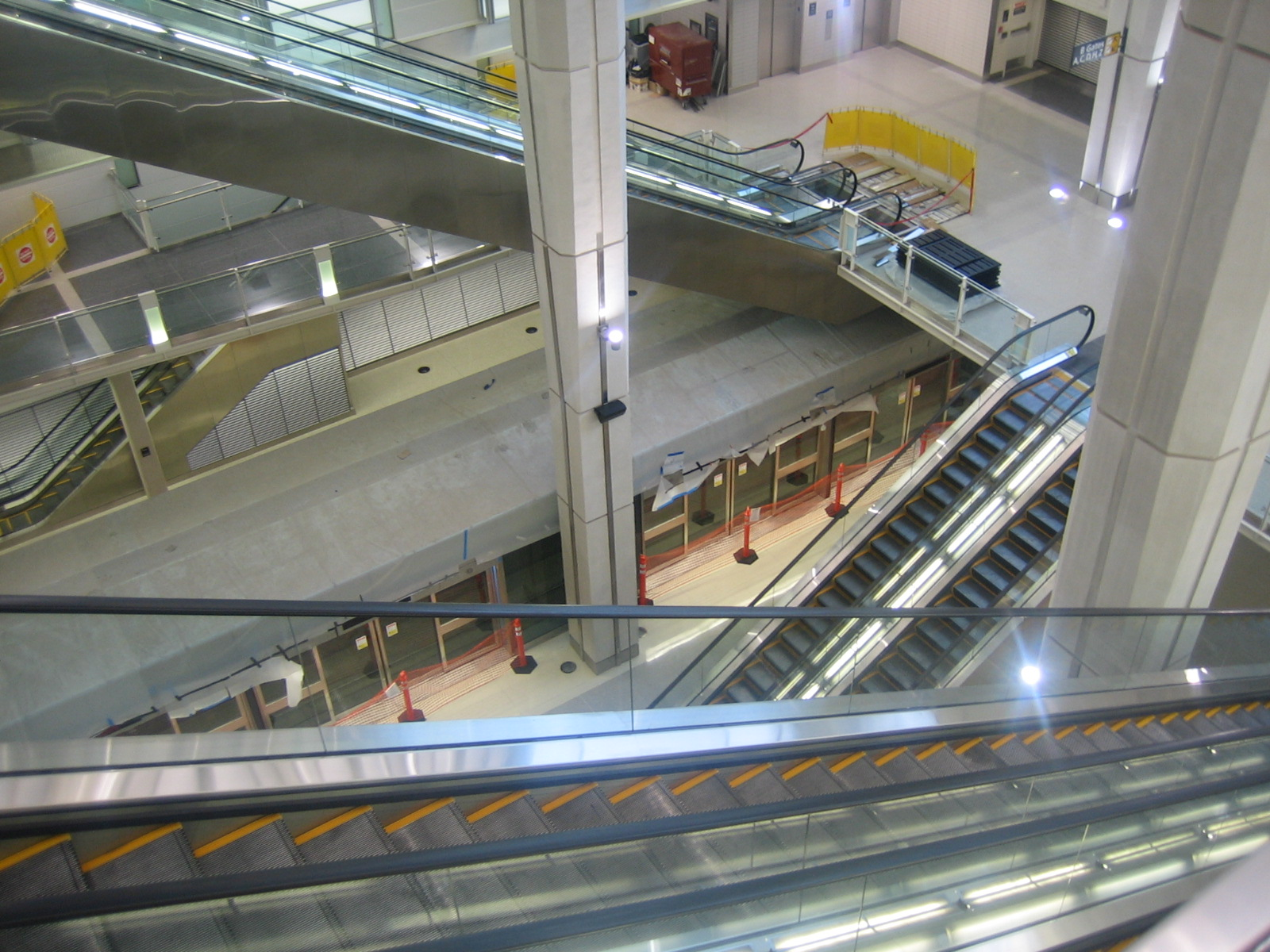
Concourse B station during construction
