= Sundrome =

Terminal at JFK Airport (1969–2011)

Coordinates: 40.647951°N 73.7794°W

The Sundrome, later TWA Domestic Terminal and Terminal 6, was one of several terminals at John F. Kennedy International Airport. It was designed by I. M. Pei & Partners (now Pei Cobb Freed & Partners). Opened in 1969, it was initially used by National Airlines. It had been occupied at various times by Trans World Airlines (domestic flights), Pan Am, United Airlines (SFO and LAX transcontinental flights), ATA Airlines, Pan American Airways (1996–1998), Carnival Airlines, Vanguard Airlines, and America West Airlines. Most recently, from 1998 to 2008, Terminal 6 was the home of JetBlue. It became vacant on October 22, 2008, when JetBlue moved to Terminal 5, and finally demolished in 2011.

== Design ==
I.M. Pei, in his design of the Sundrome, used all-glass mullions, unprecedented at the time.

== History ==
Prior to the construction of the Sundrome, National Airlines used a corrugated metal quonset hut as a terminal located between the eventual location of the Sundrome and Terminal 7 from 1948, when the airline first provided air service from Idlewild Airport, as it was then known. National Airlines commissioned the construction of the Sundrome, which opened on November 30, 1969. National Airlines used the Sundrome until its acquisition by Pan American World Airways in 1980.

Trans World Airlines then expanded into the terminal, referring to it as the TWA Terminal Annex, later called TWA Domestic Terminal, then Terminal 6. It was eventually connected to the TWA Flight Center (later part of the TWA Hotel). The connection was by a landside plywood walkway that was interrupted by a terminal driveway. Later, after TWA reduced flights at the airport, the terminal was used by United Airlines, ATA Airlines, a reincarnated Pan American Airways (1996-1998), Carnival Air Lines, Vanguard Airlines, and America West Airlines. On October 30, 2000, United Airlines and the Port Authority of New York and New Jersey announced plans to redevelop this terminal and the TWA Flight Center as a new United terminal.

On April 29, 2010, the Port Authority of New York and New Jersey announced that Terminal 6 would be demolished to allow JetBlue to consolidate its operations at an expanded Terminal 5. Despite an effort by preservationists to protect the building, demolition of the entire terminal was completed as planned in October 2011. The former Terminal 6 site was then used to expand the current Terminal 5 to include international facilities.
