= INC Architecture and Design =

INC Architecture and Design, PLLC
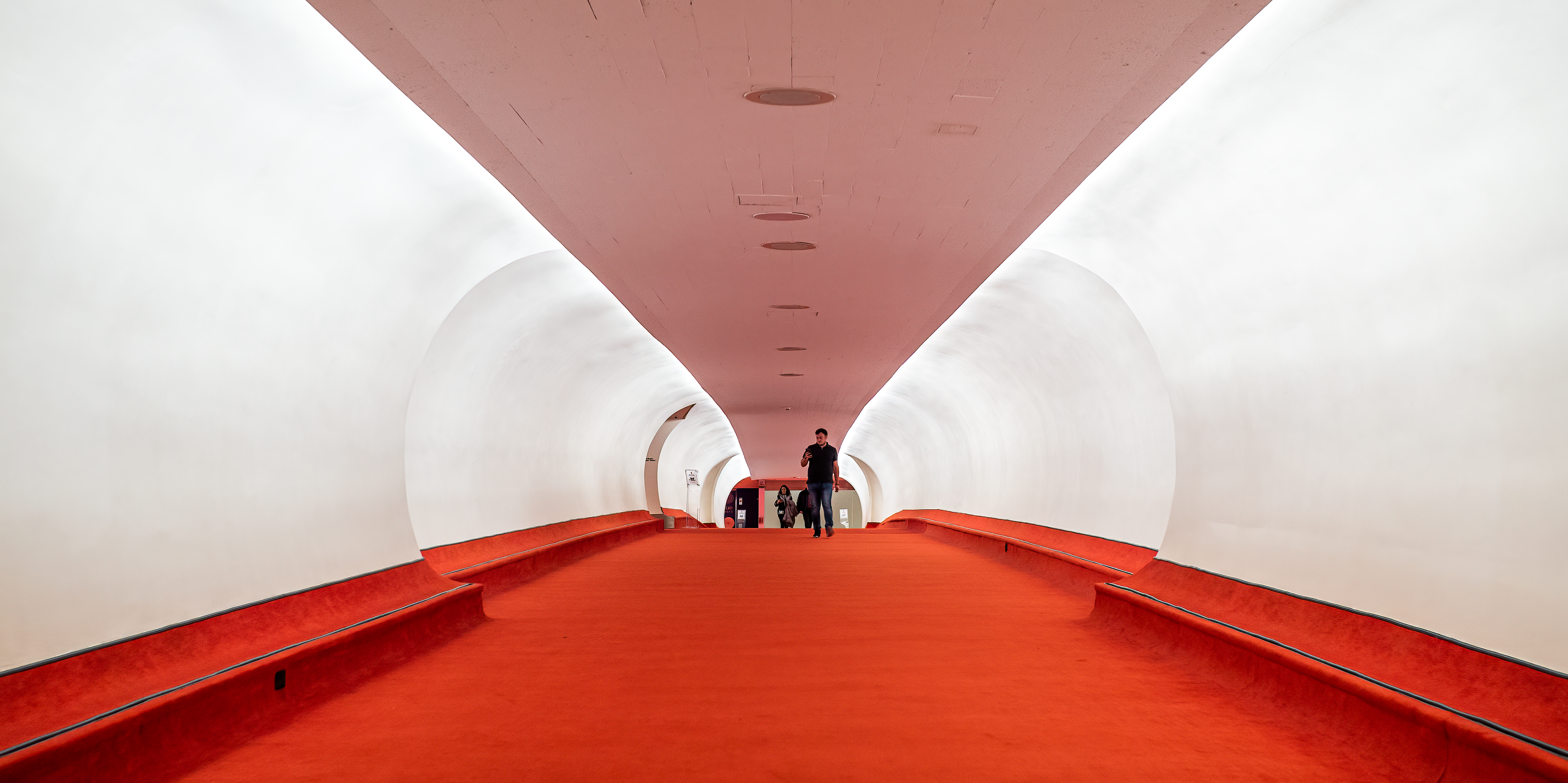
- TWA Hotel / Flight Center
- Type: Architecture & Design
- Founded: New York, New York (2006)
- Founders: Adam Rolston, Gabriel Benroth, Drew Stuart
- Headquarters: SoHo, New York
- Services: Architecture, Interiors, Product design
- Number of employees: 50
- Website: www.inc.nyc

INC Architecture and Design, PLLC (INC) is an architecture and design studio based in New York City. Notable projects include 1 Hotel Brooklyn Bridge, Rockefeller Center Rink Level Concourse, and the TWA Hotel.

The name INC is an acronym, using Latin terms to represent three aspects vital to design: Iucunditas, for joy; Necessarius, for utility; and Creo, for craft.

== Notable Projects ==
- TWA Hotel (at the TWA Flight Center), Queens NY
- 1 Hotel Brooklyn Bridge Park, Brooklyn NY
- Rockefeller Center Rink Level Public Concourse, New NY
- Anagram Columbus Circle, New York NY
- The Treadwell, New York NY
- The Line Hotel DC, Washington DC
- The Morrow, Washington DC
- Saint Marks Place, New York NY
- Momofuku Noodle Bar (at the Time Warner Center), New York NY
- 121 East 22nd Street, New York NY
- Equinox DUMBO, Brooklyn NY
- Equinox Williamsburg, Brooklyn NY
- The Sutton Condominium, New York NY
- Parlour Condominium, Brooklyn NY
- The Vandewater, Morningside Heights, New York NY
- Vinyl Pines, Bethel, NY

== Recognitions ==
- 2017 HD Awards: Winner, 1 Hotel Brooklyn Bridge Park (Best Sustainable Project); Finalist, Hex Table (Casegoods and Furniture)
- 2017 NYCxDESIGN Awards: Winner, Equinox DUMBO (Health and Wellness); Finalist, The Sutton (Residential Lobby/Amenity Space)
- 2017 BDNY Gold Key Awards: Winner, 1 Hotel Brooklyn Bridge (Best Eco-Conscious or Socially-Conscious Hotel, Best Guest Room Luxury); Designer of the Year
- 2017 Interior Design Best of Year Awards: Winner, 1 Hotel Brooklyn Bridge (Domestic Boutique Hotel); Honoree, Equinox DUMBO (Fitness)
- 2018 Architizer A+ Awards: Jury Winner, 1 Hotel Brooklyn Bridge (Hotels & Resorts)
- 2018 HD Awards: Winner, The Line Hotel DC (Public Space - Lifestyle)
- 2018 NYCxDESIGN Awards: Winner, 18th Street Triplex (Medium Apartment); Winner, 1 Hotel Brooklyn Bridge (Hotel)
- 2018 AHEAD Awards: Winner, 1 Hotel Brooklyn Bridge (Hotel New Build)
- 2018 Interior Design Best of Year Awards: Finalist, 18th Street Triplex (Mid-Size Apartment); Winner, The Line DC (Hotel Transformation)
- 2019 Architizer A+ Awards: Finalist, Parlour (Residential Unbuilt, Multi-Unit Housing)
- 2019 NYCxDESIGN Awards: Winner, Momofuku Noodle Bar, Columbus Circle (Restaurant); Winner, INC Studio (Firm's Own Office)
- 2019 AHEAD Awards: Winner, TWA Hotel (Hotel Transformation)
- 2019 DNA Paris Awards: Winner, Vandewater (Architecture: Housing)
- 2019 Interior Design NYC PowerGrid 100: TWA (#20 for Top 20 Largest Projects); Firm (#17 for Top 100 Firms)
- 2019 Best of Year Awards: Finalist, INC Studio (Firm's Own Office); Finalist, Frank Chair (Residential Accent Chair); Winner, TWA Hotel (Hotel Transformation)
- 2019 Architect's Newspaper Best of Design Awards: People's Choice, TWA Hotel (Hotel of the Year)
- 2020 Frame Awards: Winner, TWA Hotel (Building of the Year, Lighting - Indoor, Adaptive Reuse)
- 2020 AHEAD Awards: Shortlisted, TWA Hotel (Event Spaces, Guest Rooms, Lobby)
- 2020 HD Awards: Winner, TWA Hotel (Restorations, Transformations, + Conversions, Midscale Public Space); Finalist, TWA Hotel (Midscale Hotel)
- 2020 NYCxDESIGN Awards: Winner, TWA Hotel (Hotel, Commercial Lobby/Amenity Space); Winner, 121 East 22nd (Residential Lobby/Amenity Space); Honoree, Vandewater (On the Boards: Residential); Honoree, Portale (Large Restaurant)
- 2020 Interior Design Best of Year Awards: Honoree, Saint Marks Place (On the Boards: Residential)
- 2021 AHEAD Awards: Winner, The Joseph Nashville (Suite)
- 2021 ULI New York Awards: Finalist, TWA Hotel (ULI Americas Awards for Excellence)
- 2021 Architizer A+ Awards: Finalist, Parlour (Residential, Multi Unit Housing, Mid Rise (5-15 floors))
- 2021 NYCxDESIGN Awards: Winner, 1 Hotel Brooklyn Bridge (Iconic NYC Project); Honoree, Parlour (Building Facade)
- 2021 HD Awards: Winner, The Joseph Nashville (Suites)
- 2021 Architizer A+ Awards: Finalist, Lamé (Furnishings - Residential Furniture)
- 2021 AN Best of Products Awards: Winner, Lamé (Residential Furnishings)
- 2021 Interior Design Best of Year Awards: Honoree, The Joseph Nashville (Resort Hotel); Honoree, Iris (Fine Dining)
- 2022 NYCxDESIGN Awards: Winner, JACX&CO (Food Hall); Winner, 1740 Broadway (Commercial Lobby - Staircase)
- 2022 Architect's Newspaper Best in Practice: Honorable Mention, Firm (Architect (Large Firm) (30-100 Employees) - Northeast)
- 2023 NYCxDESIGN Awards: Winner, TWA Hotel (Iconic Project); Finalist, Saint Makes Place (Building Facade); Finalist, Rockefeller Center Rink Level (NYC's Shining Moment)
- 2023 Interior Design Best of Year Awards: Winner, The Morrow (Boutique Hotel); Honoree, Five Acres (Large Casual Dining)
- 2024 Architizer A+ Awards: Finalist, The Vandewater (Multi Unit Housing - High Rise)
- 2024 HD Awards: Finalist, The Morrow (Hotel - Upscale)
- 2024 Re-Thinking the Future: Runner Up, Anagram Reception Desk (Interior Design Element - Build)
- 2024 NYCxDESIGN Awards: Winner, Anagram Columbus Circle (Multi-Unit Housing)
- 2024 SARA NY Awards: Winner, Anagram Columbus Circle (Multifamily Residential: Condominiums, Apartments)
- 2024 SARA National Awards: Honor Award, Anagram Columbus Circle (Multi-Family Residential: Condominiums, Apartments)
- 2024 Interior Design Best of Year Awards: Winner, Anagram Columbus Circle (Multi-Unit Housing); Honoree, The Treadwell (Residential Lobby + Amenity)
- 2024 AIANY Interiors: Winner, Anagram Columbus Circle (Residential Review)
- 2024 AIA New York Design Awards: Merit Award, Rockefeller Center Rink Level (Interiors - Corporate)
- 2025 CDA Awards: Longlisted, Anagram Columbus Circle (Best Residential Project in Architecture); Longlisted, Rockefeller Center Rink Level (Best Commercial & Cultural Project in Interior Design)
