= TWA Flight Center =

Terminal at JFK Airport in Queens, New York

- Trans World Airlines Flight Center
- U.S. National Register of Historic Places
- New York State Register of Historic Places
- New York City Landmark
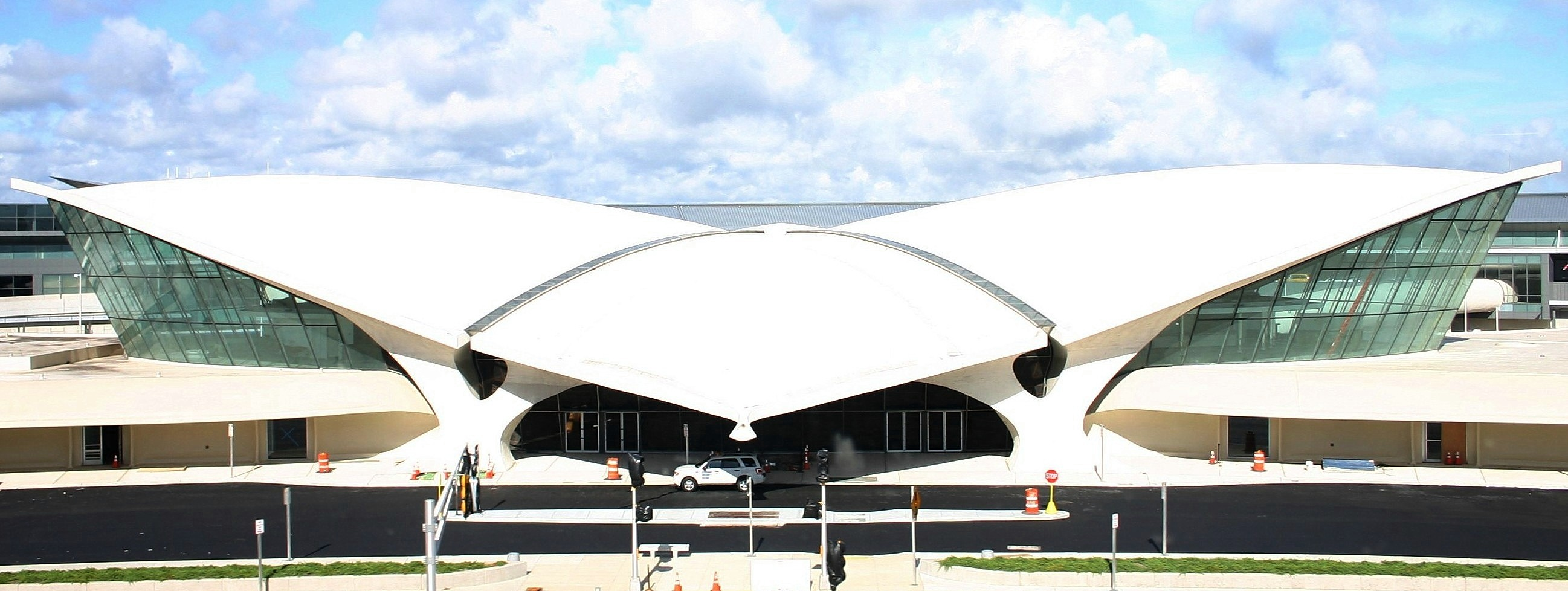
- The terminal's headhouse in 2010
- Location: John F. Kennedy International Airport; Queens, New York, United States
- Coordinates: 40°38′45″N 73°46′39″W
- Area: 17.6 acres (7.1 ha)
- Architect: Eero Saarinen and Associates
- Architectural style: Futurist, Neo-futurist, Googie, Fantastic
- NRHP reference No.: 05000994
- NYSRHP No.: 08101.007165
- NYCL No.: 1915, 1916

Significant dates
- Added to NRHP: September 7, 2005
- Designated NYSRHP: June 22, 2005
- Designated NYCL: July 19, 1994

The TWA Flight Center (also known as the Trans World Flight Center or TWA Terminal) is a building at John F. Kennedy International Airport (JFK) in Queens, New York, United States. Designed by Eero Saarinen and Associates for Trans World Airlines (TWA), the building was completed in 1962 and operated as an airport terminal for four decades. The building's main section, the headhouse, was repurposed as part of the TWA Hotel in 2019. The headhouse is flanked by two towers added for the hotel and is partially surrounded by Terminal 5 (T5), a terminal for JetBlue.

The headhouse has a thin shell concrete roof, shaped like a set of bird's wings and supported by four Y-shaped piers. Inside is an open, three-level space with large windows; the windows overlooked the tarmac before Terminal 5 and the TWA Hotel's towers were built. The TWA Flight Center also includes two tube-shaped, red-carpeted departure and arrival corridors extending outward from the headhouse. These formerly connected to the TWA Flight Center's detached "flight wings", which contained the gates. The flight wings were demolished and the corridors were truncated in the 2000s, during the development of Terminal 5.

Saarinen's firm was hired to design the TWA Flight Center as part of a 1955 master plan for Idlewild (now JFK) Airport. After years of design and modeling work, construction began in June 1959, and the TWA Flight Center was dedicated on May 28, 1962. It originally had one flight wing; Roche-Dinkeloo, a successor firm to Saarinen's company, designed a second flight wing, which opened in 1970. Various other additions took place over the years, and domestic flights were moved to the Sundrome in 1981. After TWA sold its assets to American Airlines in 2001, the terminal closed. There were proposals to refurbish the original structure as an entrance to T5 (which opened in 2008), but they were ultimately abandoned. As part of the TWA Hotel's construction, the headhouse was renovated, and the two hotel wings were constructed, opening in 2019. The original design was widely acclaimed; the interior and the exterior of the headhouse are New York City designated landmarks, and the building is on the National Register of Historic Places.

== Architecture ==
The TWA Flight Center, designed by Eero Saarinen and Associates, is centered on a headhouse consisting of a reinforced concrete shell roof. The design incorporates elements of the Futurist, Neo-futurist, Googie, and Fantastic architectural styles. Key collaborators from the Saarinen office included Kevin Roche, Cesar Pelli, Norman Pettula, and Edward Saad. The interiors were largely designed by Warren Platner. To engineer the roof, Saarinen collaborated with Charles S. Whitney and Boyd G. Anderson of the firm Ammann & Whitney. (Note: Saarinen worked with the same team in executing the Kresge Auditorium (1953–1955) and the main terminal at Dulles International Airport (1958–1962).) The project involved Grove Shepherd Wilson & Kruge as the general contractor; the Arup Group as the structural engineer; Langan as the civil engineer; and Jaros, Baum & Bolles as the mechanical, electrical, and plumbing engineer. It was one of several airport terminals Saarinen designed, along with the Dulles Main Terminal in Virginia and Ellinikon International Airport near Athens, Greece.

The headhouse sits on a curve along one of JFK Airport's access roads, near the elevated AirTrain JFK people mover tracks. The headhouse's form was designed to accommodate its small wedge-shaped site, with walkways and gates arranged at acute angles. Radiating from the headhouse are two departure–arrival passenger tubes, the "Flight Tubes", extending southeast and northeast. (Note: In its reports about the TWA Flight Center head house, the New York City Landmarks Preservation Commission uses approximate compass directions for convenience; for instance, objects that are actually to the northeast are described as being to the north. In this article, the precise compass directions are used.) The TWA Flight Center was among the first to use enclosed passenger jetways, which connected with flight wings (structures with airline gates). The jetways provided shelter from inclement weather and removed the need to walk on the ground to reach planes.

When the headhouse was used as a terminal, there were a parking lot and a passenger canopy outside the front entrance. Adjoining the headhouse to the east is JetBlue's Terminal 5 (T5), built in 2008 to designs by Gensler. T5's entry hall wraps around the TWA Flight Center's headhouse. The original headhouse has, since 2019, served as a lobby for TWA Hotel, which includes two buildings designed by Lubrano Ciavarra Architects. There is a valet parking lot for the hotel outside the headhouse's entrance, along with a nearby parking garage for T5 that connects with the AirTrain JFK station.

=== Exterior ===
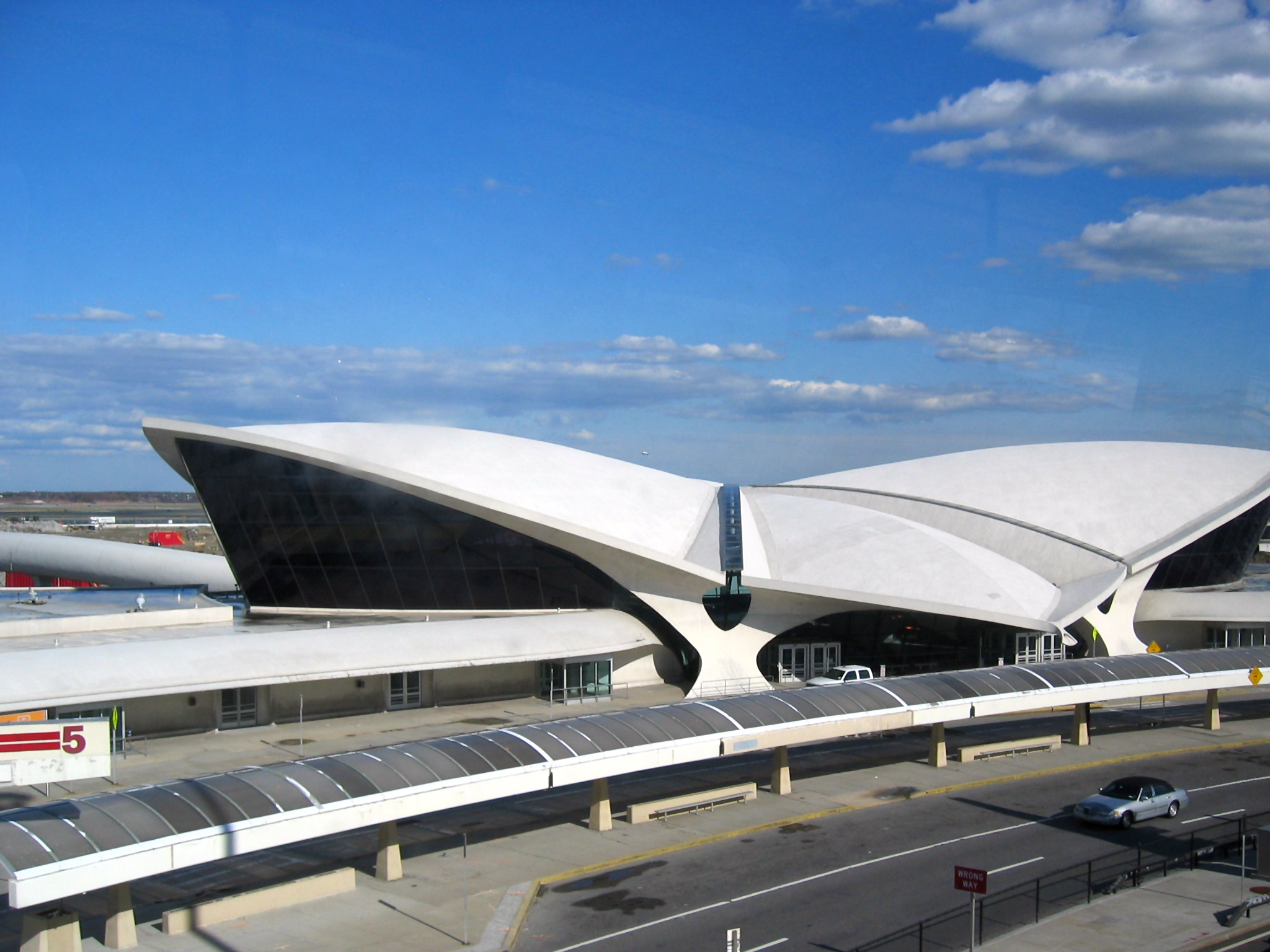
Exterior view as seen in 2006, before either T5 or the TWA Hotel opened

The TWA Flight Center's headhouse is a two-story structure. The main portion of the headhouse's facade is made of green-tinted glass walls measuring 1/4 inch (6.4 mm) thick and spanning 3,500 square feet (330 m^{2}). The facade consists of 236 pieces of glass, which were cut on site during construction. These walls allowed passengers inside to visualize planes landing, taxiing, unloading, loading, and taking off. They were coated with a dark purple mylar film at some point before 2005. A canopy extends outward from the headhouse, covering part of the sidewalk.

Single-story annexes extend outward from the headhouse to the north and south and contain several door openings within the concave walls. Inside these annexes are maintenance areas. The TWA Flight Center also had its own control tower, from which TWA staff could see planes on the apron. The tower had control systems and monitors that allowed staff to display flight information in the headhouse. Although the original design included a heliport, it never saw regular use outside the 1964 New York World's Fair.

==== Roof ====
The roof was designed to span a wide space using as little material as possible. It is composed of two upward-slanting concrete shells at the edges, which resemble birds' wings, and two smaller shells slanting downward toward the front and back of the structure. The upward-slanting shells reach up to 75 feet (23 m) above ground level. The shells converge at the center, where each of the four shells supports the others. Four Y-shaped piers support the roof, facing the front and back; these measure 51 feet (16 m) tall by 315 feet (96 m) long. Skylights are placed within the gaps between the shells. The roof weighs 6,000 short tons (5,400 t), (Note: Some sources cite the roof as using 5,000 short tons (4,500 long tons; 4,500 t) of concrete and 500 short tons (450 long tons; 450 t) of steel, for a total of 5,500 short tons (4,900 long tons; 5,000 t).) covering about 1.5 acres (0.61 ha). The concrete varies in thickness from 7 inches (180 mm) at the edges to 40 inches (1,000 mm) at the convergence of the four shells. (Note: Another source describes the shell's thickness as varying from 7 to 44 inches (180 to 1,120 mm).) The roof shells are cantilevered by up to 80 feet (24 m) and contain steel reinforcement to accommodate the roof's weight. The main entrance is on the land side, where the roof projects over a sidewalk (formerly a driveway) with a scupper.

When the TWA Flight Center was erected, thin-shell concrete roofs could not be built in other parts of New York City due to building code restrictions. The roof could be built only because the Port Authority of New York and New Jersey was exempt from city building codes. The shape of the roof recalled that of the Chevrolet Impala's "gull wing", developed by General Motors, for which Saarinen had designed the GM Technical Center.

=== Interior ===
The TWA Flight Center incorporated many innovations for its time, including closed-circuit television, a central public address system, baggage carousels, a schedule board, baggage scales, and gates that were distant from the headhouse. TWA staff received instructions through a pneumatic tube system. Departing and arriving passengers at the TWA Flight Center were not separated into their own areas, a common practice at other airport terminals. A writer for The American Scholar magazine said the overall layout acted like a grand procession, with passengers ascending from the entrance. Passengers continued from the headhouse to the flight wings, two outlying gate structures detached from the headhouse. The historian Alice T. Friedman said the design allowed occupants to both engage in activities (such as sitting down or observing planes) and to watch others partake in the same activities. According to the writer Kornel Ringli, the interior's curving shape created an impression of movement and speed, which was then amplified in popular media.

==== Headhouse ====
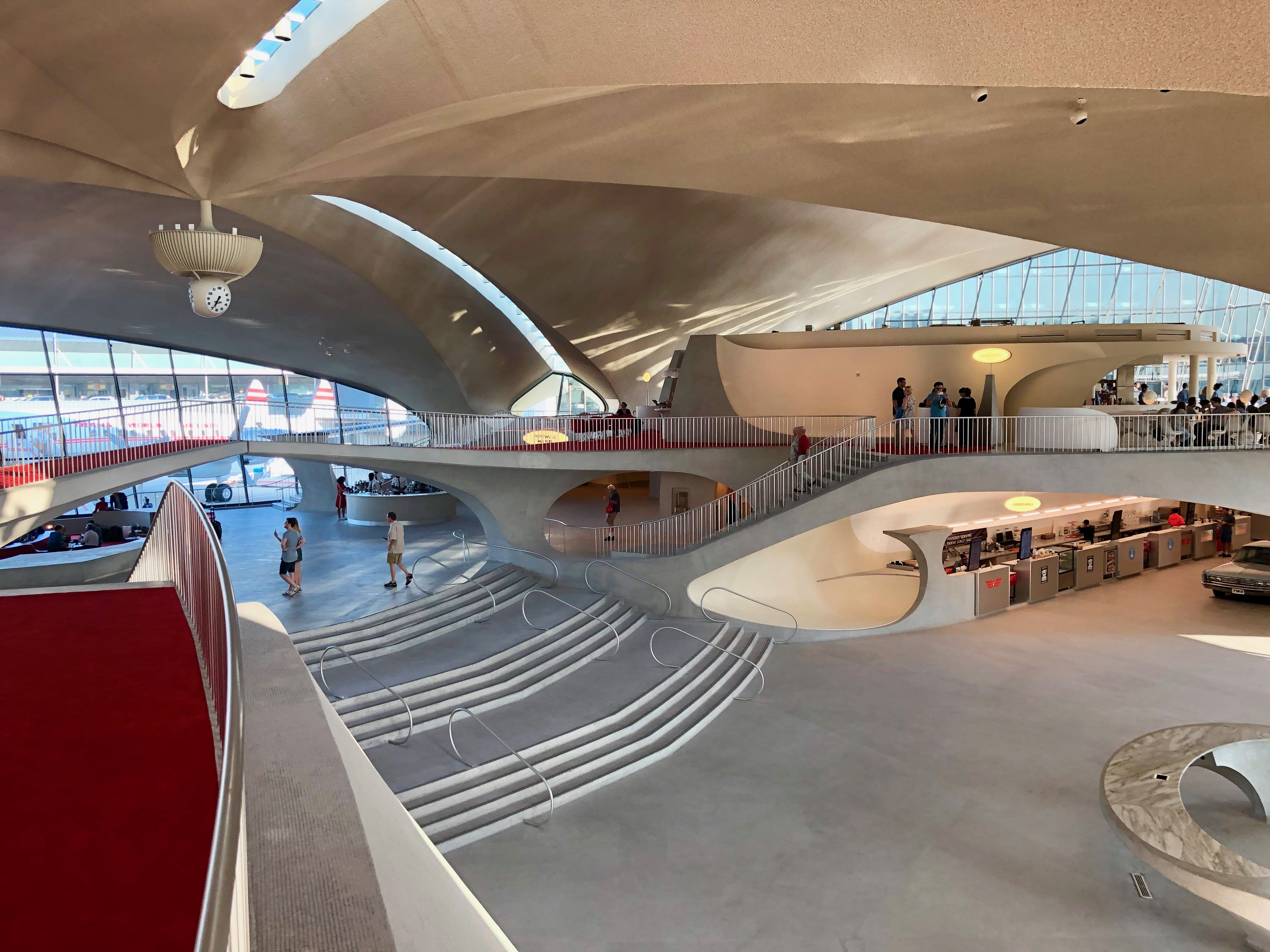
View east from the headhouse's upper level. The footbridge between the two halves of the upper level is visible in the left background. Below it is the intermediate level, while to the right is the lower level.

The headhouse spans 200,000 square feet (19,000 m^{2}), with a width of 152 feet (46 m) and a length of 230 feet (70 m) at ground level. There are two full stories: an upper level and a lower level. An intermediate level, facing east, is joined to the lower level by a central staircase and to the upper level by four peripheral staircases. The interior uses concrete in design details such as desks, seats, and the flight information display; these concrete surfaces not only served as a continuation of the exterior but also demonstrated the malleability of the material. The interior uses almost 58 million ceramic tiles, which line the walls and floors, visually complementing the headhouse's concrete surfaces. As part of the TWA Hotel's development, the original headhouse's interior was converted into the hotel's lobby, retail, and amenity area, with restaurants and the hotel's reception desk. TWA-related objects, such as posters and uniforms, are exhibited there.

The lower level contains the former ticket counter and baggage claim areas. These areas, situated in distinct wings flanking a central entrance lobby, were placed near the curbside canopy to maximize convenience for passengers. A sculpted marble information desk, carved as a single slab, rises from the lobby floor, and a split-flap display by Solari originally displayed flight information. When the terminal was in operation, arriving passengers picked up their luggage at carousels next to the entrance, which traveled at 65 feet per minute (20 m/min). The lower level also had computerized baggage scales and conveyor belts. There are also mechanical, service, and office areas in a partial basement under the intermediate level, as well as a tunnel leading to the former Flight Wing 1. The TWA Hotel operates a 50,000-square-foot (4,600 m^{2}) event area in the basement.

Twelve steps from the lower level ascend about 5 feet (1.5 m) to the intermediate level. There is a sunken conversation pit on the intermediate level, which faces east and originally overlooked a tarmac. Although the original conversation pit had been removed by the 1990s, it was recreated as part of the TWA Hotel. In addition, by the early 1990s, a switchback ramp had been added between the lower level and the intermediate level to comply with the Americans with Disabilities Act of 1990. There is also an elliptical plaque commemorating Saarinen.

A concrete balcony on the upper floor spans above the central staircase that connects the lower floor to the intermediate level. The upper floor had multiple eateries. The TWA operated its Ambassador Club on the northern portion of the upper floor (left of the entrance), designed by Saarinen Associates. The southern (right) portion of the upper floor contained the London Bar & Constellation Club, the Lisbon Lounge, and the Paris Café, all designed by Raymond Loewy. There were also offices on the upper level, north and south of the public areas. A three-sided clock, dating from 1963, hangs from the center of the ceiling, where the rooftop shells converge. The clock was not part of the original plans, but it was retained when the building became part of the TWA Hotel.

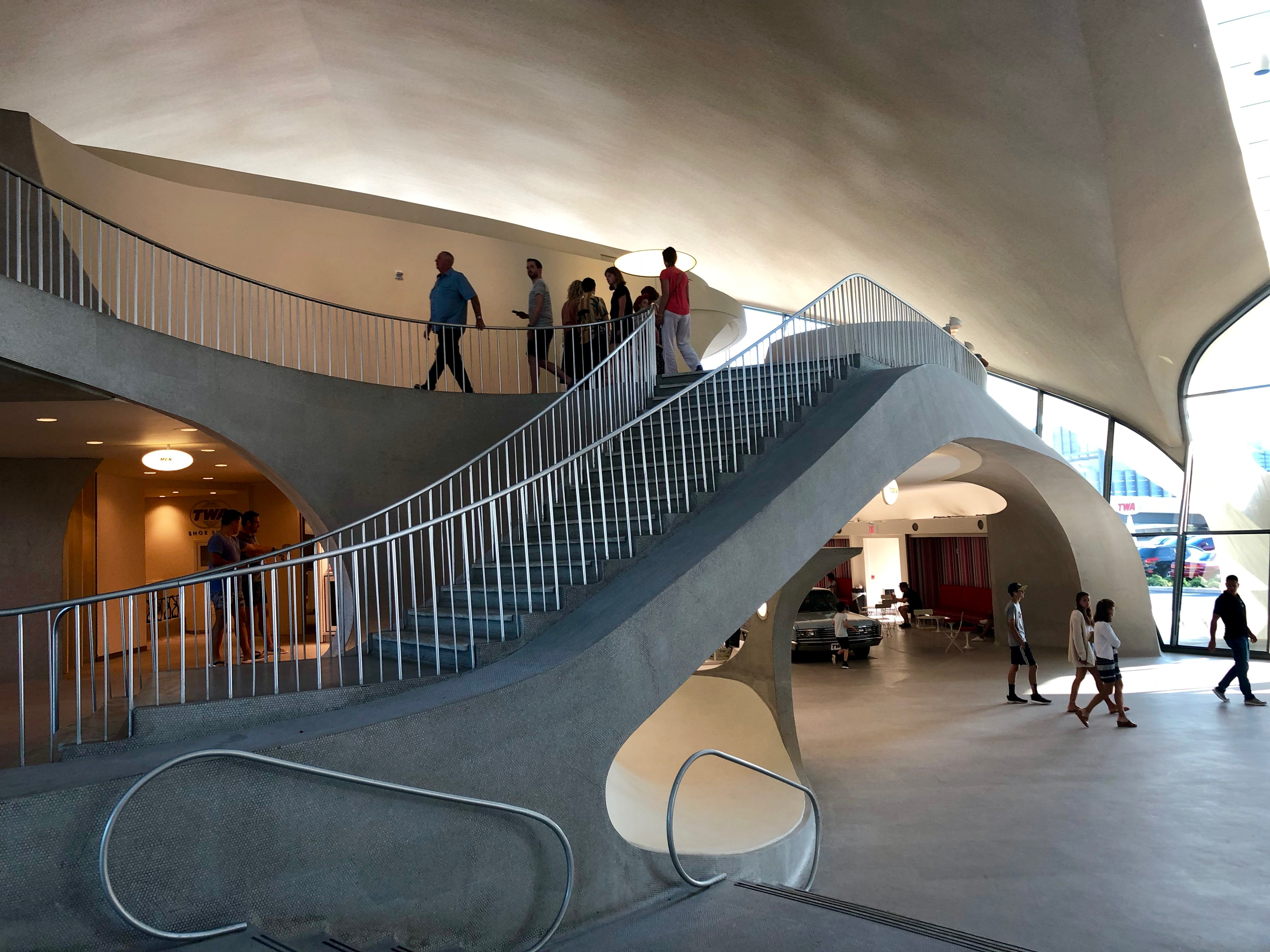
Curving staircase inside the headhouse

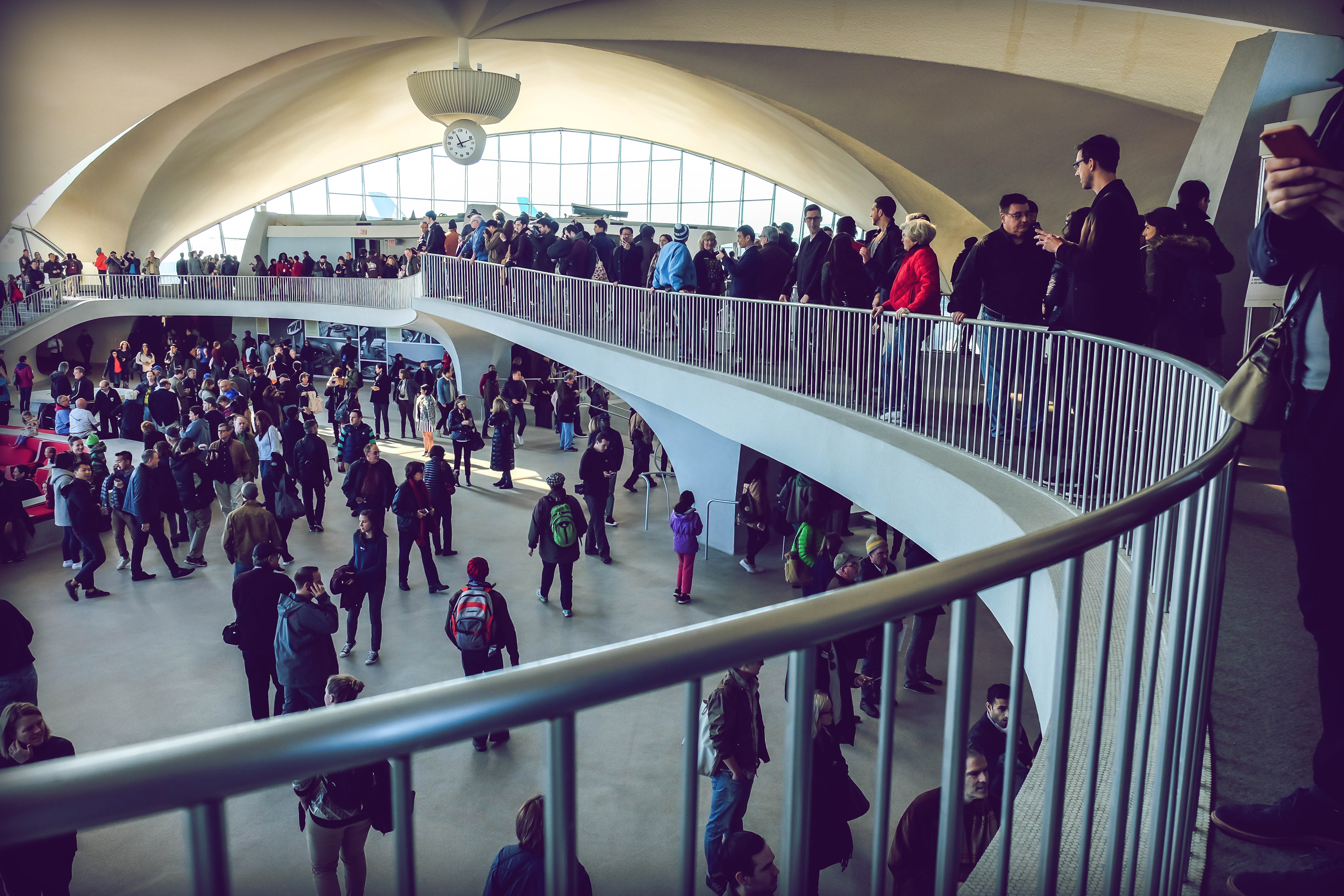
The footbridge on the upper level, spanning above the intermediate level

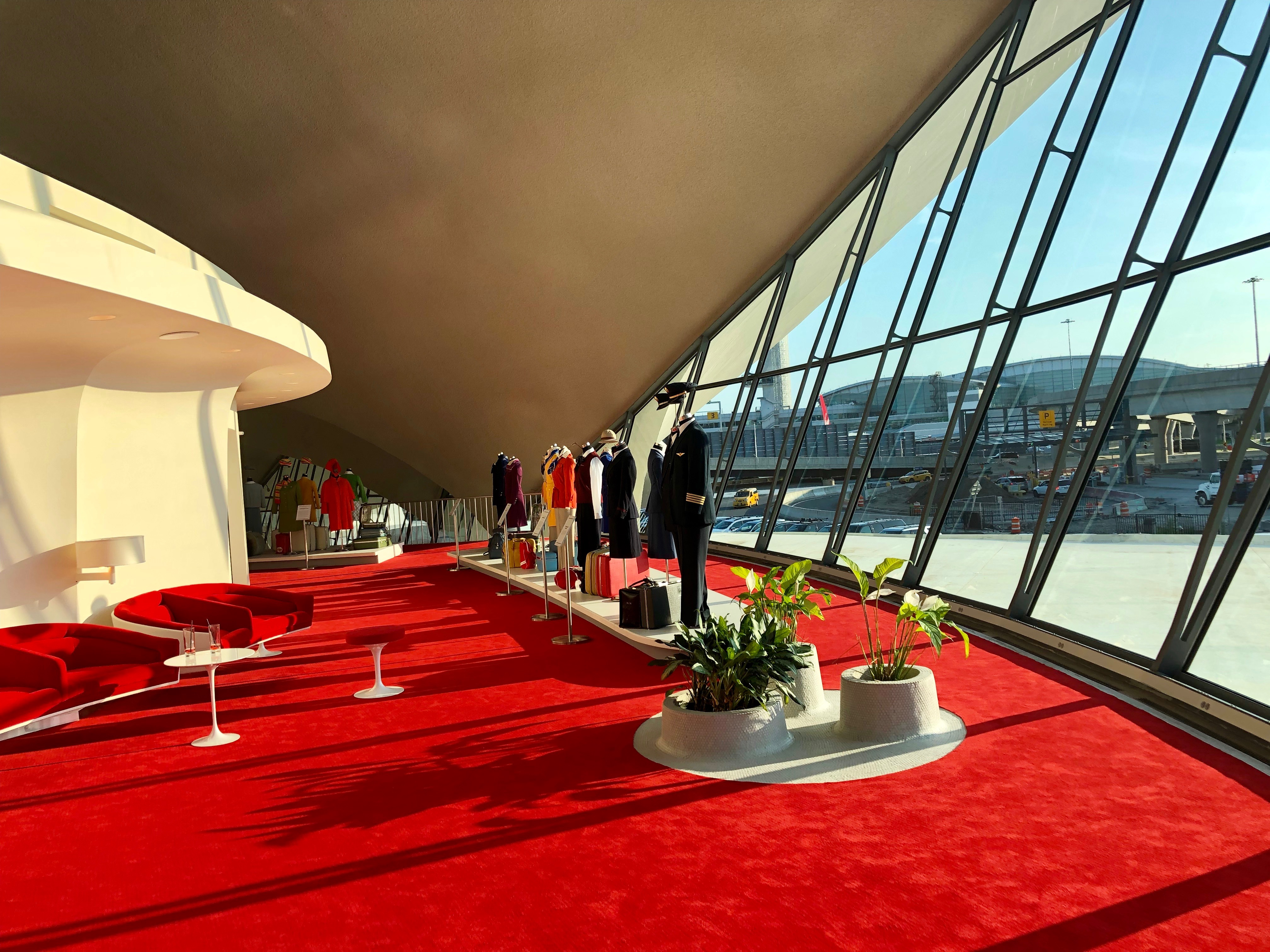
Ambassador Club

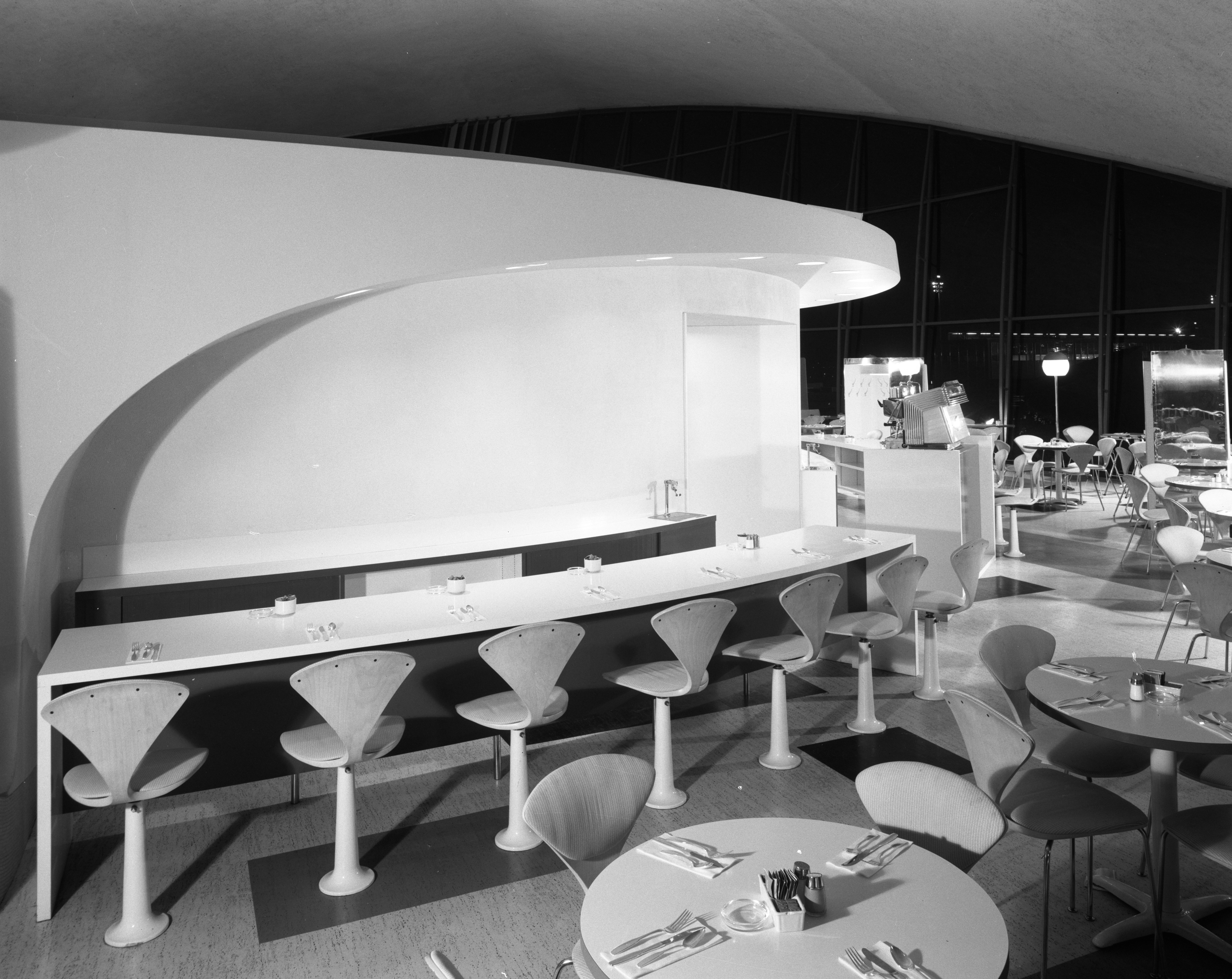
Union News restaurants coffee shop

==== Passageways ====
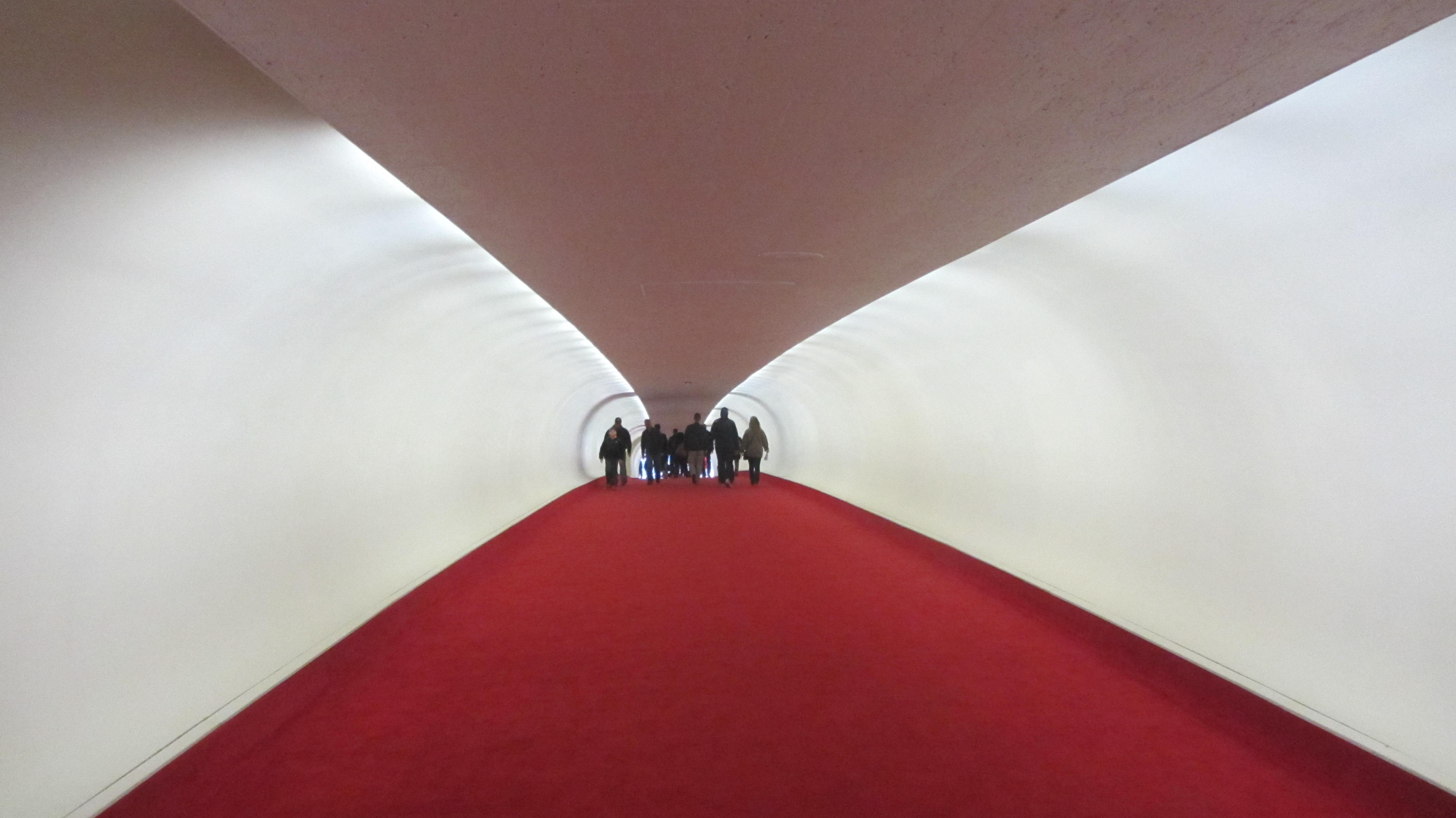
Interior of one of the flight tubes

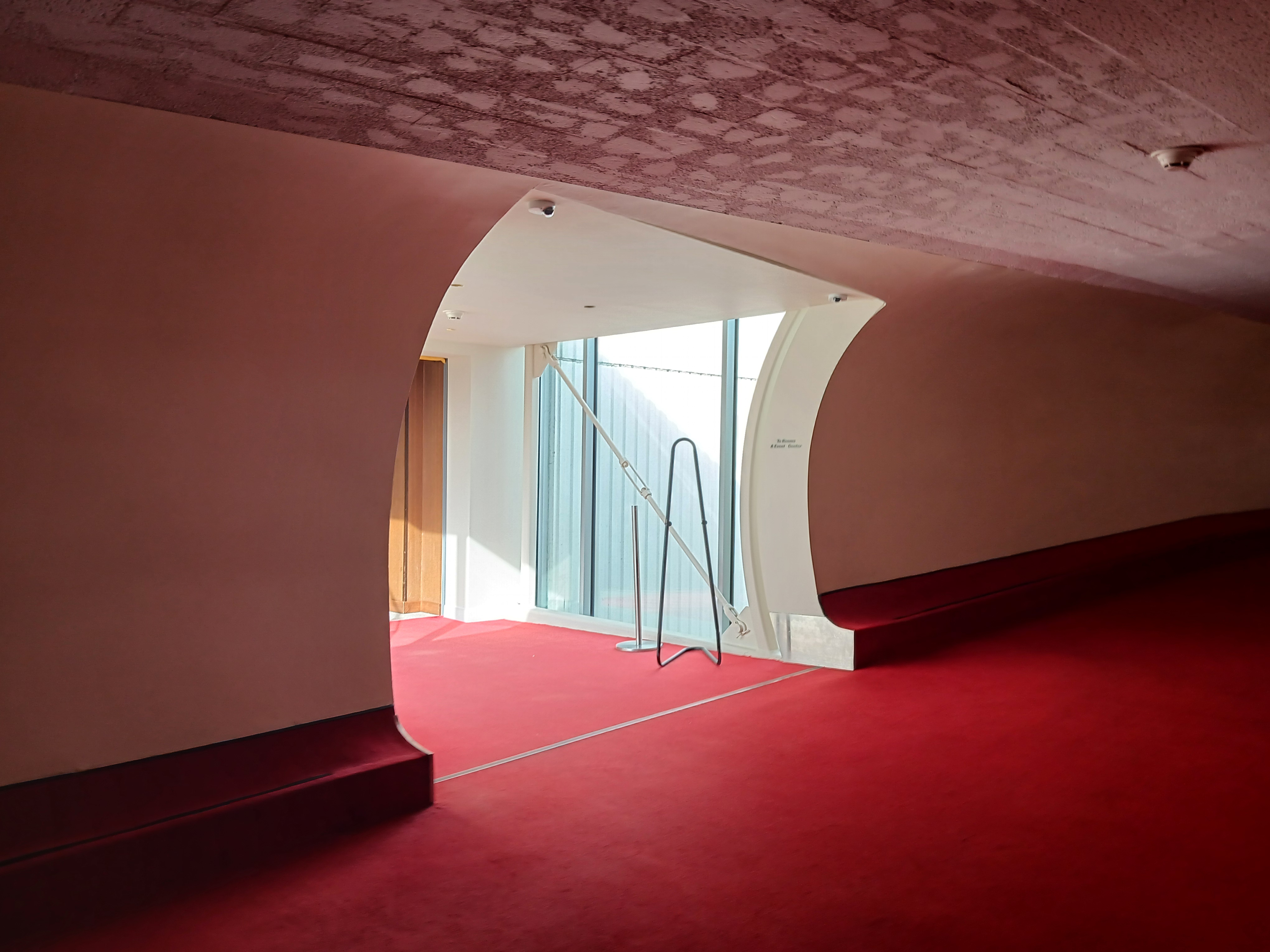
Connection to one of the TWA Hotel's wings from the flight tubes

The two passageways, leading from the headhouse's intermediate level, are completely enclosed and cross an access roadway. The passageway leading southeast was called Flight Tube 2, while the passageway leading northeast was called Flight Tube 1. The tubes originally led to the flight wings and are 6 feet (1.8 m) higher at the site of the flight wings than at the headhouse. Flight Tube 1 is about 232 feet (71 m) long while Flight Tube 2 is 272 feet (83 m) long. Following the opening of the TWA Hotel, the tubes connect the headhouse to the guestrooms; Flight Tube 1 leads to the hotel's Saarinen wing, and Flight Tube 2 leads to the Hughes wing. The ends of the flight tubes contain mockups of Saarinen's and Hughes's offices, and the end of Flight Tube 1 also has an elevator connecting directly to JetBlue's Terminal 5.

The tubes are covered in concrete, with an elliptical cross-section and indirect lighting. TWA's press releases indicated that the design features were intended to heighten travelers' anticipation before they boarded their planes. Original plans called for the passageways to be designed as bridges with glass ceilings; each passage would have two moving walkways, one in each direction, with a stationary hallway in between. As a cost-saving measure, the moving walkways were removed from the final plans. Although Saarinen had wanted to reduce the distance that passengers walked to planes, the TWA Flight Center's passengers still had to walk a significant distance through the flight tubes. This contrasted with Saarinen's later Dulles International Airport Main Terminal, where he designed mobile lounges to ferry passengers directly to planes. The tubes were preserved when T5 was built.

==== Flight wings ====
Floor plans for the passenger sections of Flight Wings 1 (left) and 2 (right)Floor plans for the passenger sections of Flight Wings 1 (top) and 2 (bottom)

Flight Tube 2 originally connected with Flight Wing 2, built as part of the original TWA Flight Center in 1962, while Flight Tube 1 connected with Flight Wing 1, built during a 1967–1970 expansion designed by Saarinen Associates' successor firm Roche-Dinkeloo. Both sections were characterized as violin-shaped, with jetways extending outward from the end of each wing. The flight wings had concrete and plaster bases, along with passenger concourses cantilevered above. The proximity of the flight wings allowed easier transfers between flights, since passengers needed to travel only between the two wings or adjacent gates, rather than changing between terminals. Fueling and heating systems were embedded into the apron adjoining the flight wings.

Flight Wing 2, shaped like a multi-sided polygon, was the smaller of the two structures, with seven gates. It contained utilitarian decor as well as a small flight operation center above the passenger area. Two bridges led to departure lounges (labeled gates 39 and 42), which could both fit 100 passengers; these had a red-and-oyster color scheme with furnishings. Flight Wing 1 was larger than Flight Wing 2, having been built to accommodate Boeing 747 jumbo jets, and had 10 gates. Flight Wing 1 had four levels, which contained passenger areas, Federal Inspection Services, and operations facilities; there were also baggage claim carousels in Flight Wing 1's basement, connected to the headhouse via people mover. Both flight wings were demolished with the construction of T5 in the 2000s.

=== T5 and TWA Hotel ===
Abutting the TWA Flight Center are JetBlue's Terminal 5 and the TWA Hotel's wings. T5 is variously cited as containing 625,000 square feet (58,100 m^{2}) or 635,000 square feet (59,000 m^{2}) of space. T5 has a 55,000-square-foot (5,100 m^{2}) retail area, a children's play area, and a 1,500-space parking garage. It has 26 gates and could handle 20 million passengers annually.

Two glass towers curve around the original headhouse. These towers, which were constructed as part of the TWA Hotel, have 512 guest rooms. The hotel's decorations include replicas of the original furnishings, such as brass lighting, walnut-accented furnishings, rotary phones, and red carpets. Some of the rooms are oriented toward the headhouse, while others face the runways. The hotel has underground event space, built around the TWA Flight Center; the land under the headhouse rested on pilings and could not be excavated. There is also a 10,000-square-foot (930 m^{2}) observation deck and a swimming pool.

== History ==
New York International Airport, also known as Idlewild Airport, began operations in 1948 and was renamed John F. Kennedy International Airport (JFK)in 1963. Transcontinental and Western Airlines (TWA) signed a lease with the airport's operator, the Port of New York Authority (later the Port Authority of New York and New Jersey, or PANYNJ) in 1949. Idlewild had the highest volume of international air traffic of any airport globally by 1954, amid the growing popularity of air travel in the U.S. and worldwide.

=== Development ===
In February 1955, the Port of New York Authority announced a master plan to renovate Idlewild Airport. Major airlines at the airport, including TWA (renamed Trans World Airlines in 1950) would build their own terminals. Smaller airlines would be served from a central terminal, the International Arrivals Building. When the locations of each airline's terminal were announced, TWA and Pan Am were assigned spots flanking the International Arrivals Building. The site assigned to TWA was not its first choice for a terminal of Idlewild, and TWA's hangar was on the opposite side of its assigned lot.

==== Architectural commission and research ====
Under the leadership of TWA president Ralph S. Damon, TWA hired Eero Saarinen's firm, Eero Saarinen & Associates, to design the TWA Terminal. TWA public-relations executive Rex Werner convinced the company to select Saarinen, who agreed to take the commission while his firm was simultaneously working on 15 other projects. His wife Aline B. Saarinen recalled that he viewed most other air terminals as ugly, shoddy, and inconvenient. A writer for Interiors magazine described TWA as having "vision and confidence" in the project, and Kornel Ringli said that TWA sought a high-quality design similar to what Saarinen had designed for previous clients.

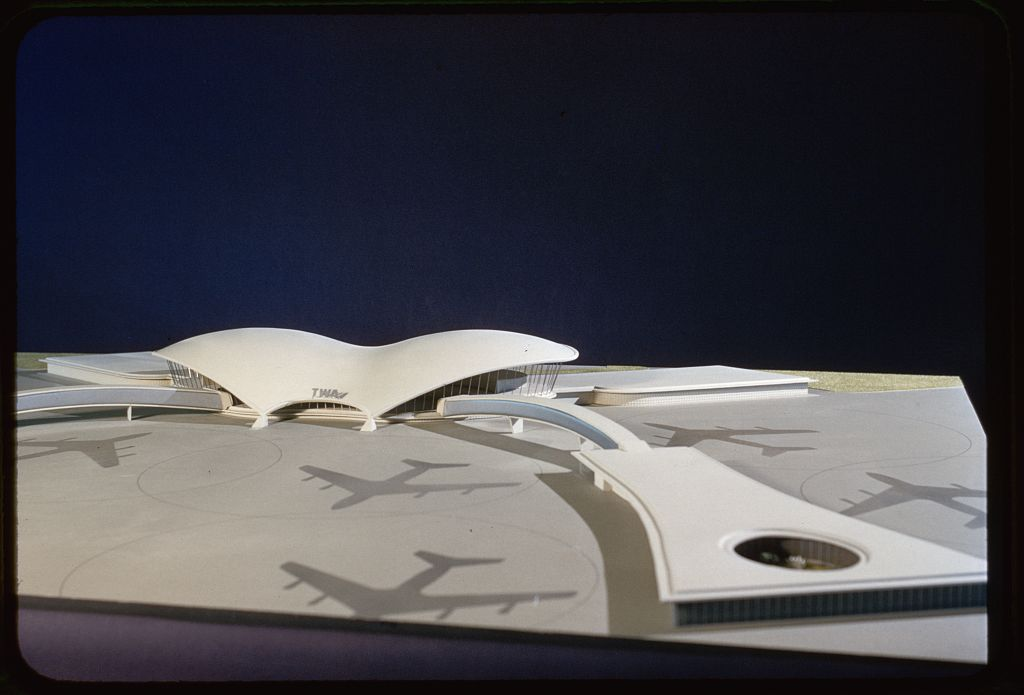
Early site model of the headhouse, showing satellite structures, in 1957

TWA anticipated that, at peak times, the terminal would accommodate 1,000 stationary visitors and 2,000 departing and arriving passengers every hour. Additionally, TWA needed fourteen positions at the terminal for large jets. Saarinen & Associates studied the operations of airports across the U.S., finding that, on average, passengers had to walk over 900 feet (270 m) from terminal to plane. Saarinen & Associates also observed passenger circulation patterns in Grand Central Terminal, the United States' busiest railroad station, where they discovered that passengers often walked in curving paths, despite the station's rectangular shape. The team drew up 35 plans for different aircraft-parking configurations, along with various studies of freight and passenger flow. According to Saarinen associate Kevin Roche, Saarinen thought the TWA tract was ideal, despite airline officials' dissatisfaction with the lot.

==== Design ====
Saarinen & Associates began designing the headhouse's form, or shape, in February 1956. Saarinen said he had been challenged to devise a "distinctive and memorable" design, which would deviate from traditional airport terminal designs. He wanted the new terminal to have a practical purpose and not only "interpret the sensation of flying", but also "express the drama and specialness and excitement of travel". Damon, similarly, wanted "the spirit of flight" to be encapsulated in the design. The building, according to Saarinen, was intended to heighten travelers' anticipation as they approached, with similar interior and exterior features creating a unified design. Saarinen did not consider any rectangular designs, but shell structures—such as what he ultimately designed for the headhouse—were not particularly new, either.

One of his original designs was sketched on the back of a restaurant menu during a dinner with Cranston Jones, an associate editor at Time magazine. The preliminary designs—which included a main waiting hall, separate arrival and departure wings, and passageways to two standalone gate buildings—were finished by mid-1956. In conjunction with the building's design, Saarinen prepared a brochure outlining his plans to TWA officials. Dissatisfied with initial concepts, Saarinen asked TWA for more time and took an additional year, testing out numerous shapes to resolve the structure's final form. Roche described one initial design as an oval shell upon four piers, saying that Saarinen had rejected that plan as awkward. An engineer for the project, Abba Tor, warned that a single slab of concrete might crack.

Saarinen & Associates first created 3D models of the planned headhouse, then drew sketches of the structure; this contrasted with the design processes of more traditional buildings, in which architects drew the sketches first. Saarinen & Associates created several wire, cardboard, and clay models of the headhouse's roof, constructed at various scales. One early model for the headhouse was based on Jørn Utzon's winning proposal for the Sydney Opera House's architectural design competition, for which Saarinen had been a judge. Saarinen had originally envisioned the roof as a single shell, but he refined the design twice before ultimately devising the plan with four shells. The final model for the shell may have been inspired by a breakfast during which Saarinen pressed down on the center of a grapefruit. The roof may also have been inspired by Minoru Yamasaki's design for St. Louis Lambert International Airport's main terminal; Eero's father Eliel Saarinen's design for Helsinki Central Station; and McKim, Mead & White's design for the original New York Penn Station. During another discussion, Roche used a saw to bisect one of the models, creating the inspiration for the roof's four shells.

Design sheet for the TWA Flight Center

The interior was designed next; since the space was to be symmetrical, Saarinen & Associates only created drawings for half the interior. Roche said the area around the center staircase was remodeled at least ten times. Saarinen's team frequently studied the models throughout the night, crawling across them. The team also designed two outlying gate structures, or flight wings, connected to the headhouse by passageways. With few specifications given, Saarinen & Associates designed gates for aircraft with wingspans of 110 feet (34 m), which turned out to be inadequate even before the building's completion. In addition to around 130 possible plans created by Saarinen & Associates, contractors provided hundreds of their own drawings, and workers designed cross-sections and contour maps as well. The drawings took about 5,500 man-hours to produce, and they were accurate to about 1/8 inch (3.2 mm). Saarinen & Associates devised 600 sketches of the building, of which 200 were used in the final design. The resulting plan was characterized as providing a "smooth and luxurious switch from ground transportation to planes".

==== Marketing and changes to plans ====
TWA announced plans for the terminal at the Barbizon Plaza in Manhattan on November 12, 1957. At the time, it was to cost $12 million (Note: Equivalent to $105.0 million in 2025) and begin construction the following year. The plans called for a structure with four concrete roof shells, supported by four piers; there were to be check-in counters, waiting areas, and other amenities inside. Two passageways would lead to outlying structures containing gates from which passengers would board. At the time, the building was supposed to be completed in 1960, while the TWA hangar had already been constructed earlier in 1957. In conjunction with the announcement, TWA issued two press releases describing the planned building in detail.

The plans were revised in 1958 after TWA determined Saarinen's original design to be too expensive. Only one of the two planned gate structures, Flight Wing 2, was initially built as a cost-saving measure. The passageways were to have a glazed roof and moving walkways in the original plan, but these features were absent in the final construction. Two "arms" flanking the headhouse were also removed from the plans.

Aline Saarinen helped promote the terminal and prepared images of it for exhibitions, the popular press, and trade magazines. The building was covered in dozens of press releases and articles during its development, including in trade publications, popular media, and TWA's own magazine. All of these publications promoted Saarinen's role in the design, which Ringli said was part of Aline's efforts to "turn the terminal into a memorial to [Eero Saarinen]". Many media articles used information from TWA's press releases without significant modifications, even though the press releases sometimes neglected to mention inconvenient design details, such as the presence of stairs or the absence of a full canopy outside the building. TWA convened a committee to formulate a formal name for the terminal; the group suggested the name "Trans World Flight Center" to create an explicit link between TWA's global stature and the building's function.

==== Construction ====
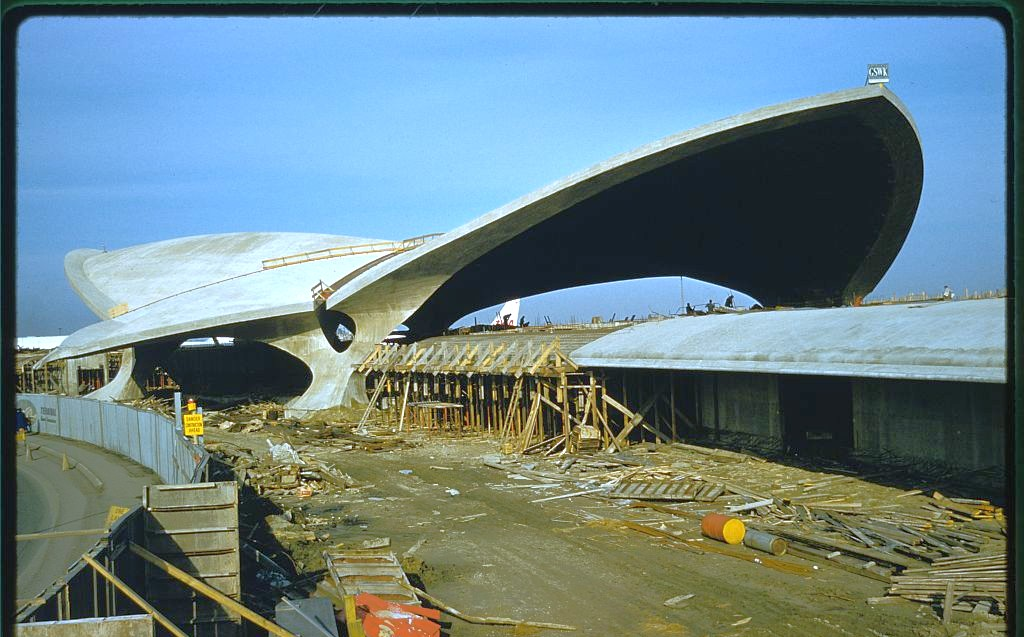
The headhouse under construction

Grove Shepherd Wilson & Kruge received the contract in early 1959. Construction began on June 9, initially with 14 engineers and 150 skilled craftspeople. At the time, work was anticipated to be completed in 1961. A grid was devised to manage the steel-pipe scaffolding at the construction site, and 5,500 supports were used in the scaffolding. (Note: Merkel 2005, p. 209, gives a different figure, saying that up to 1,800 supports "were made up of 5,000 tubular scaffold frames".) The contractors prefabricated 27 distinct shapes of wedges for the scaffolding, using 2,500 pieces in total. The process of creating the scaffolding lasted more than a year. The contractors relied partially on computer calculations to design and construct the various parts of the terminal. The four Y-shaped piers required hundreds of additional drawings to fabricate.

While work on the TWA Flight Center proceeded, several competing airlines had already completed terminals at Idlewild Airport. To compete with these airlines, TWA opened a temporary terminal in August 1960; one-eighth of the airline's passengers criticized the design of the temporary structure. The permanent structure's roof was poured as a single form starting on August 31, 1960, a job that took 120 hours. The pour involved 3,200 cubic yards (2,400 m^{3}) of concrete, which was cast in four phases. Three 45-short-ton (40-long-ton; 41 t) cranes delivered buckets of concrete to the site. The contractors constructed the roof shells to the specifications outlined in Saarinen's contour maps, which had a margin of error of 1 foot (0.3 m). Although the project employed carpenters who did not have a particular specialty, the procedures were precise enough that they required a maximum deviation of 0.25 inches (6.4 mm) from the plan.

The scaffolding was removed in December 1960, after construction had progressed enough that the entire weight of the roof could be supported by the piers. By April 1961, when only the concrete vaults had been completed, Saarinen remarked that "If anything happened and they had to stop work right now and just leave it in this state, I think it would make a beautiful ruin, like the Baths of Caracalla". The terminal hosted its first preview events the same month. Saarinen died later that year, and Roche and another of Saarinen's associates, John Dinkeloo, formed Roche-Dinkeloo, which worked to complete the building. The TWA Flight Center was one of several commissions that Roche-Dinkeloo had received from Saarinen's former clients following his death. In the three months before the building's official opening in 1962, TWA published twelve press releases promoting it. TWA's advertising manager said the airline's approach to promoting the building was to treat it "as though it were a national monument". The building had cost $15 million in total. (Note: Equivalent to $122.1 million in 2025)

=== Original use ===
==== Opening and early years ====
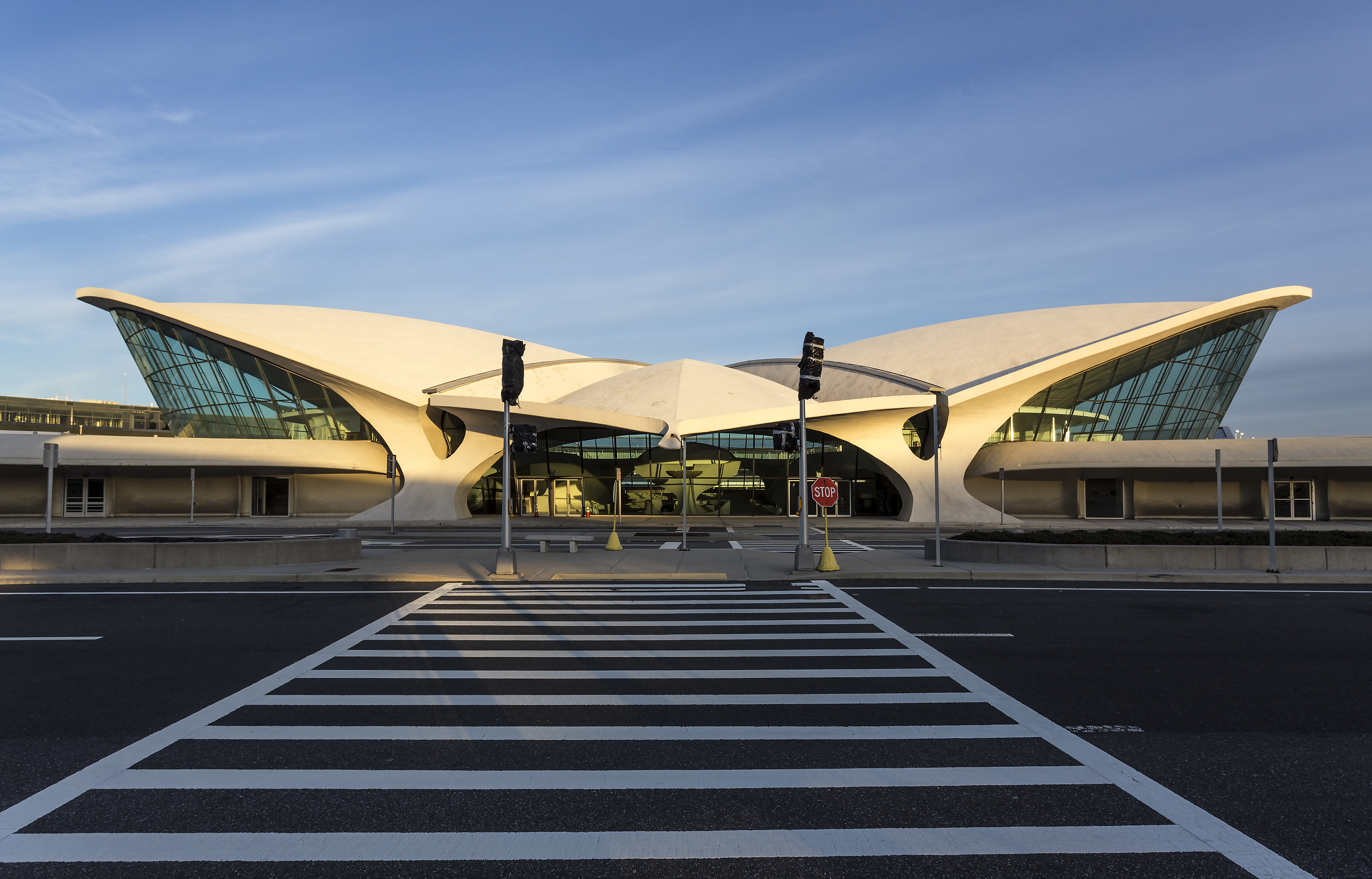
The completed terminal was dedicated on May 28, 1962.

On March 19, 1962, passengers started using the incomplete TWA Flight Center to access planes. TWA president Charles C. Tillinghast Jr. announced plans the next month to officially open the terminal, and workers continued to fit out the interior. Prior to its official opening, the building hosted a press tour on May 17 and was used for a fundraising ball on May 22. The completed terminal was dedicated as scheduled on May 28, 1962. It was finished after most of the other major U.S. airline terminals at Idlewild were completed. After the opening of the International Arrivals Building in 1957, United Airlines and Eastern Air Lines opened their own terminals in 1959, followed by American Airlines and Pan American World Airways (Worldport) in 1960, and Northwest Airlines and TWA in 1962. National Airlines' Sundrome would be the last, opening in 1969.

The terminal as completed had seven aircraft positions: six from Flight Wing 2 and a seventh from a temporary structure attached to Flight Tube 1. Four of Bernard Buffet's paintings, depicting cities where TWA operated, were installed in the TWA Flight Center in 1963. The terminal recorded 1.5 million travelers in its first year, 20% higher than expected. Throughout the decade, passenger aircraft gradually became larger, and JFK Airport's passenger numbers also increased. As such, the TWA Terminal quickly became functionally inadequate and was poorly equipped to accommodate wide-body aircraft. International flights at JFK during that time were routed through the International Arrivals Building. In 1966, Restaurant Associates took over all of the TWA Flight Center's foodservice operations. The terminal accommodated 3 million annual passengers at that point, with 140 daily flights, and it recorded 11 million passengers in its first five years, exceeding original projections by more than 50%.

==== Late 1960s to early 1980s: Expansions ====
TWA devised plans in 1966 for an expansion of the existing facility, with ticket counters and baggage areas connected to the original headhouse via a tunnel. In June 1967, TWA announced that it would build Flight Wing 1 northwest of the existing structure, hiring Roche-Dinkeloo to design it. Flight Wing 1 was expected to cost $20 million and be completed in two years. (Note: Equivalent to $151.4 million in 2025) Work started in 1968, and the concrete shell was finished by that December. The expansion included a customs facility to alleviate congestion at the International Arrivals Building's customs terminal, located within the basement. The headhouse's ticketing counter and the baggage handling area were expanded, and the new addition was connected to the basement of Flight Wing 1. BWIA West Indies Airways began operating from the TWA Terminal in November 1968, though it moved to another terminal after less than a year. Flight Wing 1 hosted its first passengers on February 25, 1970; it cost $21 million in total. (Note: Equivalent to $134.2 million in 2025) The wing was not dedicated until March 19, when international passengers could pass through the terminal directly.

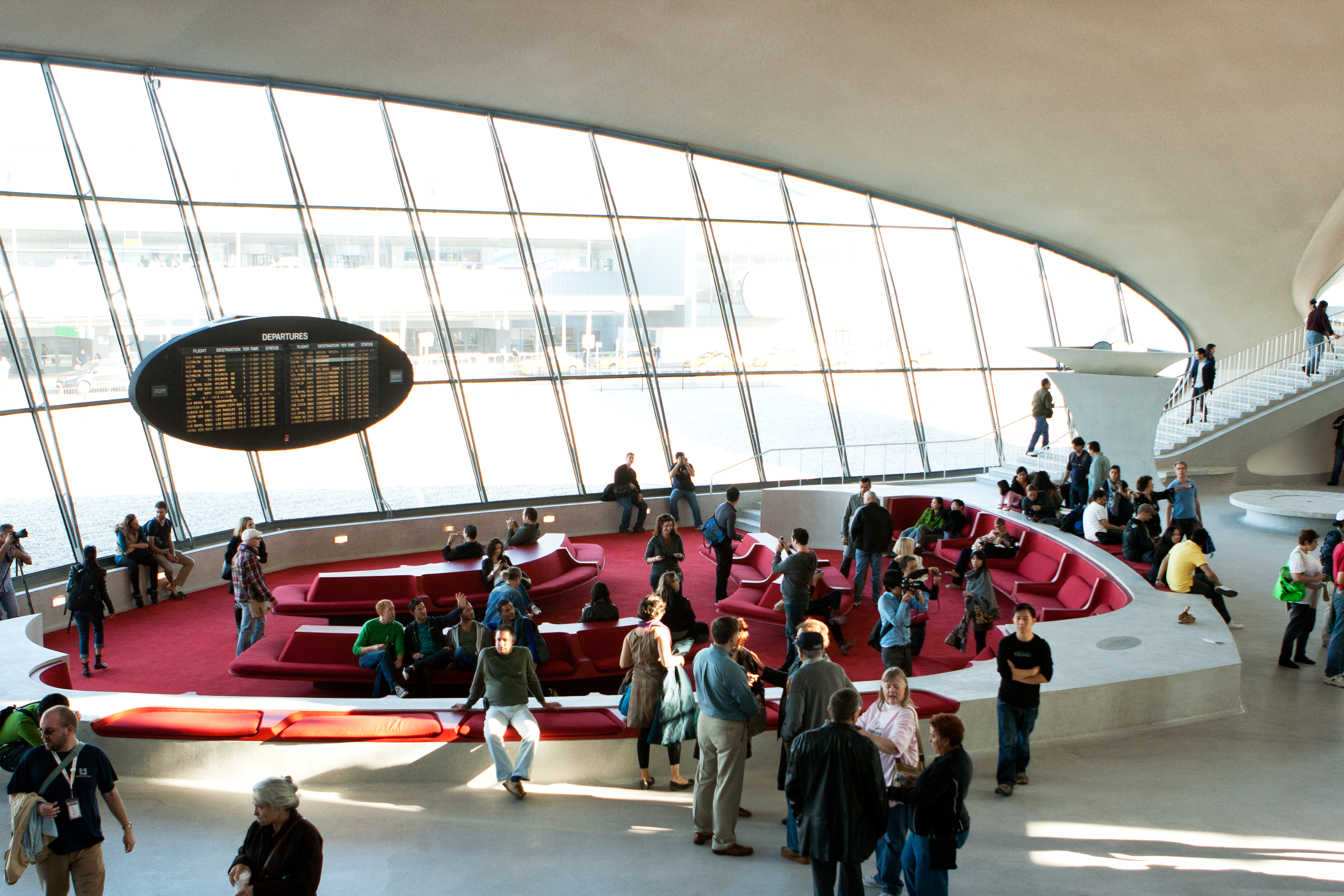
View of the headhouse's interior, facing the tarmac

In 1978 or 1979, TWA built a traffic island with a concrete-and-glass canopy to provide shelter for passengers waiting for ground transport. Measuring 330 by 22 feet (100.6 by 6.7 m), the shelter, constructed by the architectural firm Witthoefft & Rudolf, won the Albert S. Bard Award for architectural excellence. A bomb detonated at the terminal in March 1979, injuring four people. The TWA Flight Center was overcrowded by the early 1980s, and passengers sometimes had to line up outside because the terminal was so crowded. This prompted TWA to lease the neighboring Sundrome in December 1980. The expanded facility opened in April 1981; domestic flights were subsequently relocated to the Sundrome, while the TWA Flight Center continued to host international flights. A passageway was also built to connect the TWA Flight Center and the Sundrome.

==== Mid-1980s to early 2000s ====
Throughout the late 20th century, the TWA Flight Center underwent further modifications, including the addition of security screening equipment dividing the interior into two sections. Following a series of bombings and aircraft hijackings, in 1985, TWA implemented more stringent baggage checks and hired more guards and police to patrol the terminal. In addition, TWA began testing out an X-ray screening machine in September 1989, among the first machines of its type to be used in an airport. The PANYNJ had also hired Pei Cobb Freed & Partners in 1984 to design a renovation of JFK Airport; the plans, published in 1990, called for a central terminal connecting with the TWA Flight Center and other terminals. These plans were never carried out, and TWA planned a renovation of the terminal that also did not occur.

Progressive Architecture magazine described the terminal in 1992 as being in "tawdry condition", with parts of the structure appearing actively deteriorated. TWA wanted to merge with another airline by then, and the terminal's continued operation was uncertain. The New York City Landmarks Preservation Commission (LPC) designated the terminal as a landmark in 1994, amid reports that the building might be demolished. Following the 1996 crash of TWA Flight 800, investigators found that the TWA Flight Center's security protocols were lax and that unauthorized personnel could theoretically access the terminal's baggage room and even the tarmac. Later that year, amid a decline in TWA's finances, the airline eliminated many routes and moved its remaining New York operations to the TWA Flight Center. The PANYNJ considered expanding the terminal during that decade, and elastomeric coating was added to the roof in 1999 to prevent leakage.

TWA sold its assets in October 2001 to American Airlines, which briefly operated flights out of the TWA Flight Center. American Airlines ceased flight operations at the terminal in December 2001 and allowed its lease, inherited from TWA, to expire the next month. By then, airport officials saw the terminal as functionally outdated. Among other issues, the building did not meet modern accessibility or security standards, was frequently overcrowded, and had inadequate exterior canopies and access roads. Like many terminals designed before the advent of jumbo jets, increased passenger traffic, and security issues, the design had proved difficult to update as air travel evolved, particularly with regard to the placement of security checkpoints. The PANYNJ could bypass the LPC designation and demolish parts of the terminal; the Federal Aviation Administration (FAA), which could approve or reject the PANYNJ's redevelopment plan, declined to intervene.

=== Preservation and later use ===
==== Proposals for redevelopment ====
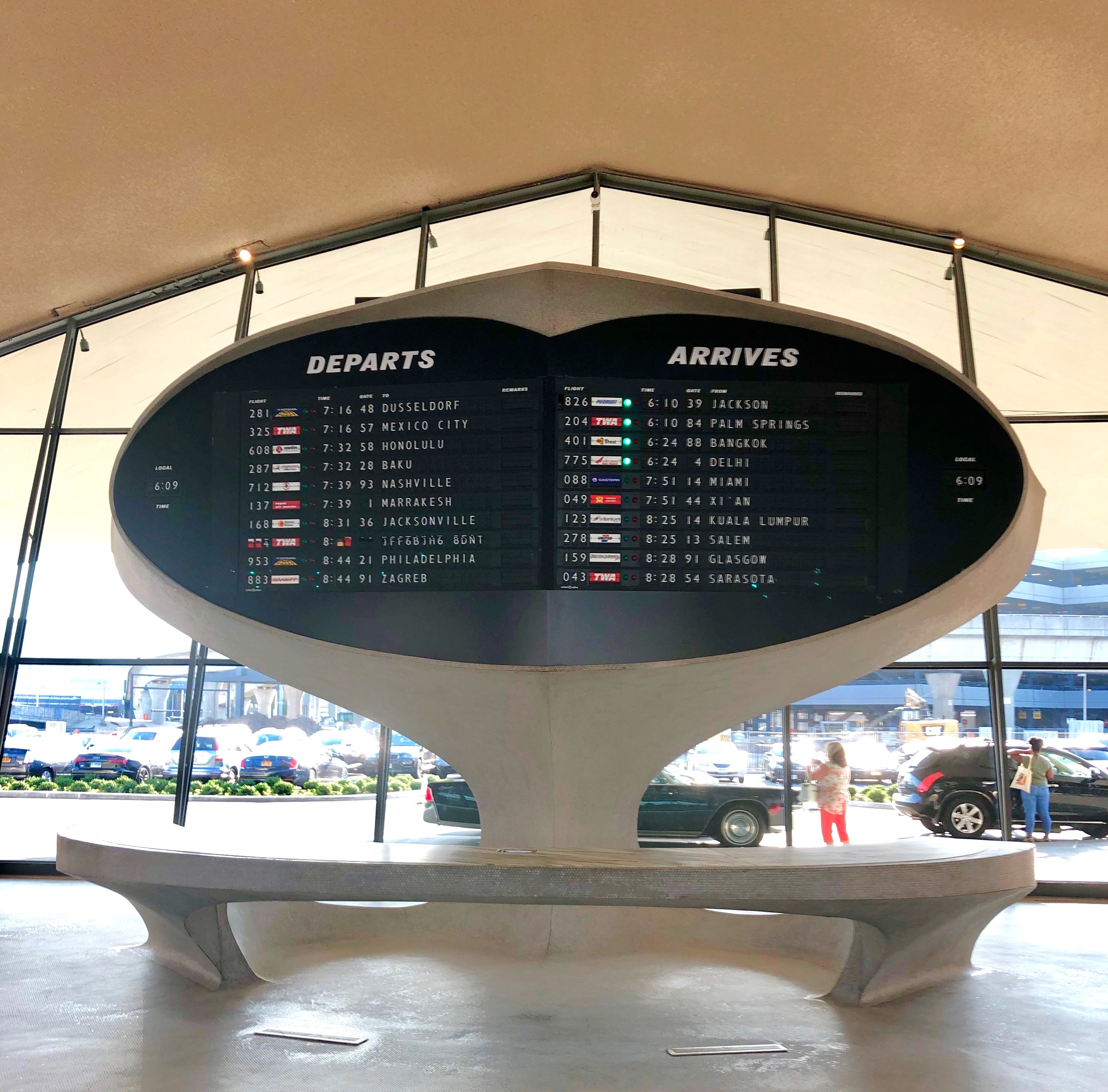
Departures board in the headhouse

In early 2001, the PANYNJ proposed preserving the tubes and erecting a new structure east of the existing building. The PANYNJ wished to destroy one or both of the flight wings. By that August, the PANYNJ had presented its first proposal, which entailed converting the headhouse into a restaurant or conference center, while encircling the existing building with one or possibly two new terminals. Preservationists expressed concerns that the terminal could be significantly modified. The Municipal Art Society (MAS) and the architects Philip Johnson and Robert A.M. Stern were against the proposal, as was Docomomo International. Detractors said the Saarinen headhouse's original design intention would be lost if it were encircled by another terminal, and that the flight wings were an integral part of the architecture. Philip Johnson, speaking at the 2001 presentation, said of the PANYNJ proposal:

This building represents a new idea in 20th-century architecture, and yet we are willing to strangle it by enclosing it within another building. Imagine, tying a bird's wings up. This will make the building invisible. If you're going to strangle a building to death, you might as well tear it down.

The MAS wanted the original structure to remain in use as a terminal, while the New York Landmarks Conservancy, another preservationist group, advocated for a more flexible plan that allowed adaptive reuse. By late 2002, there was still no agreement on the usage of the TWA Flight Center, except that the headhouse and passageways would be preserved. The following year, a draft of a request for proposal (RFP) for the terminal was released. In addition, JetBlue proposed reopening the headhouse as a check-in facility and constructing a 26-gate terminal behind the headhouse. At the time, JetBlue was operating out of the adjacent Sundrome and was the airport's fastest growing carrier. Due to the preservation disputes, the National Trust for Historic Preservation included the TWA Flight Center on its America's Most Endangered Places list in 2003. The Wall Street Journal credited the National Trust listing with having influenced the building's addition to the National Register of Historic Places in 2005.

==== Construction of JetBlue terminal ====
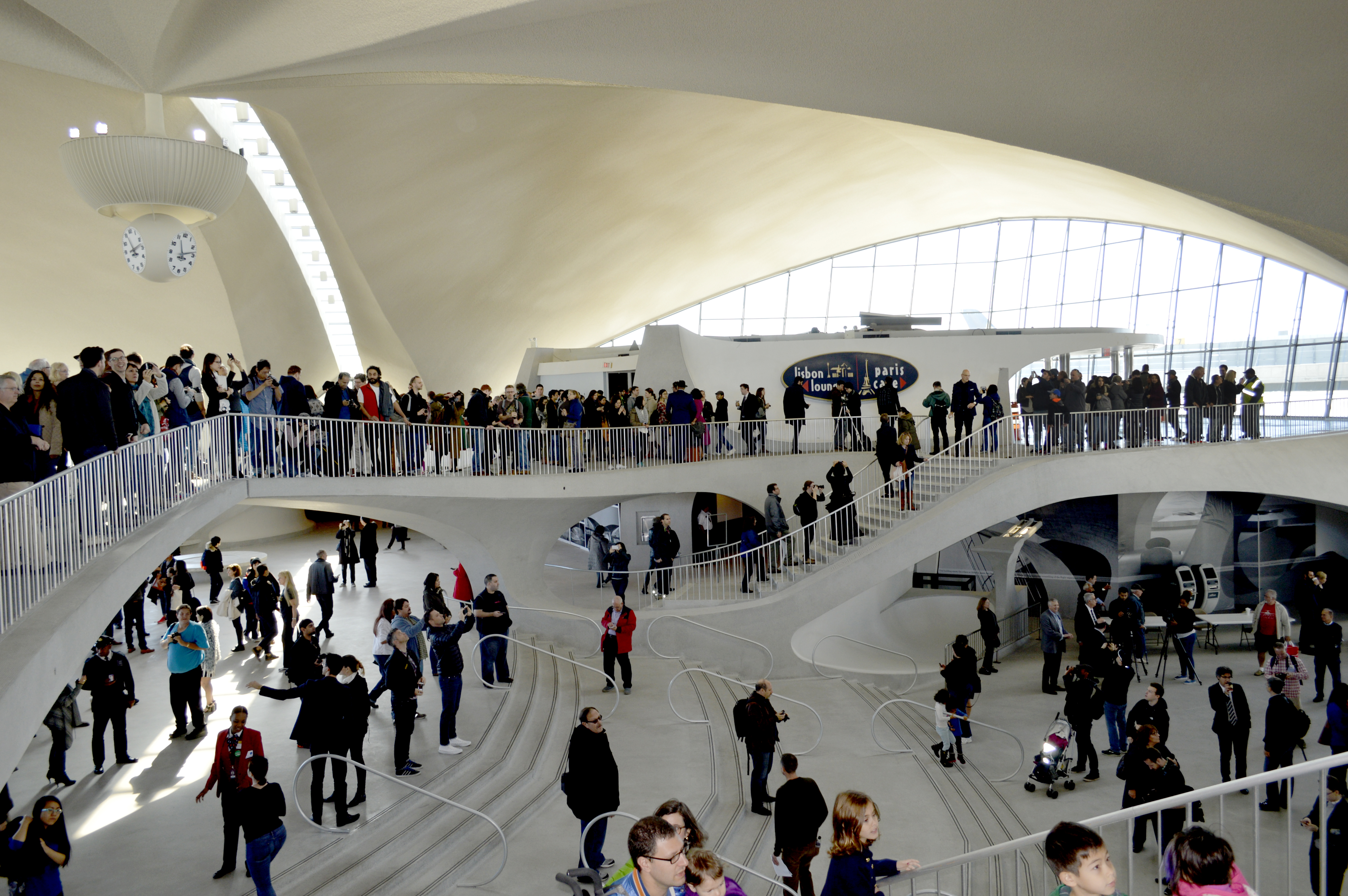
Visitors at the headhouse in 2015

The PANYNJ and JetBlue came to an agreement on the construction of the new terminal in August 2004, and Gensler was hired to design the new structure, known as T5. As part of the plan, two JetBlue ticket kiosks were to be installed in the original headhouse, which, along with T5, was supposed to have become part of a new Terminal 5. Because the headhouse was not intended to be fully integrated into the new terminal, another tenant had to be identified for the rest of the headhouse. Separately, the PANYNJ signed an agreement with the FAA and historic-preservation agencies for the renovation of the headhouse. The structure was also supposed to host an art exhibition called Terminal 5, with work, lectures, and temporary installations drawing inspiration from the headhouse's architecture. Though the exhibition was planned to run from October 2004 to January 2005, the show closed abruptly after the headhouse was vandalized during the opening gala.

In December 2005, the PANYNJ began construction of the T5 facility behind and partially encircling the headhouse. The two flight wings were demolished to make space for the new facility, and roadways were constructed under the flight tubes. The construction of T5 obstructed direct views of the tarmac from the headhouse. The PANYNJ issued a final RFP for the headhouse in 2006, requesting proposals for the space not occupied by the ticket counters. Originally, the PANYNJ was to renovate a departure lounge at the end of Flight Wing 2, known as the "trumpet". The lounge was lifted and moved 1,500 ft (460 m) at a cost of $895,000. (Note: Equivalent to $1.4 million in 2025) The lounge was later demolished, and the PANYNJ prioritized renovating the headhouse instead. The cost of relocating the "trumpet" had been estimated at $10 million, (Note: Equivalent to $15.8 million in 2025) slightly less than the $11 million estimated cost of the headhouse project. (Note: Equivalent to $17.4 million in 2025)

The PANYNJ approved $19 million in repairs to the headhouse in early 2008. (Note: Equivalent to $27.9 million in 2025) The headhouse's renovation included removing asbestos and replacing or restoring deteriorated design details. T5 opened on October 22, 2008. At the time of T5's opening, JetBlue and PANYNJ had yet to complete renovation of the original Saarinen headhouse. There were disagreements over whether the headhouse should be used for conferences, converted to a restaurant, or adapted for some other use.

==== Conversion of headhouse into hotel ====
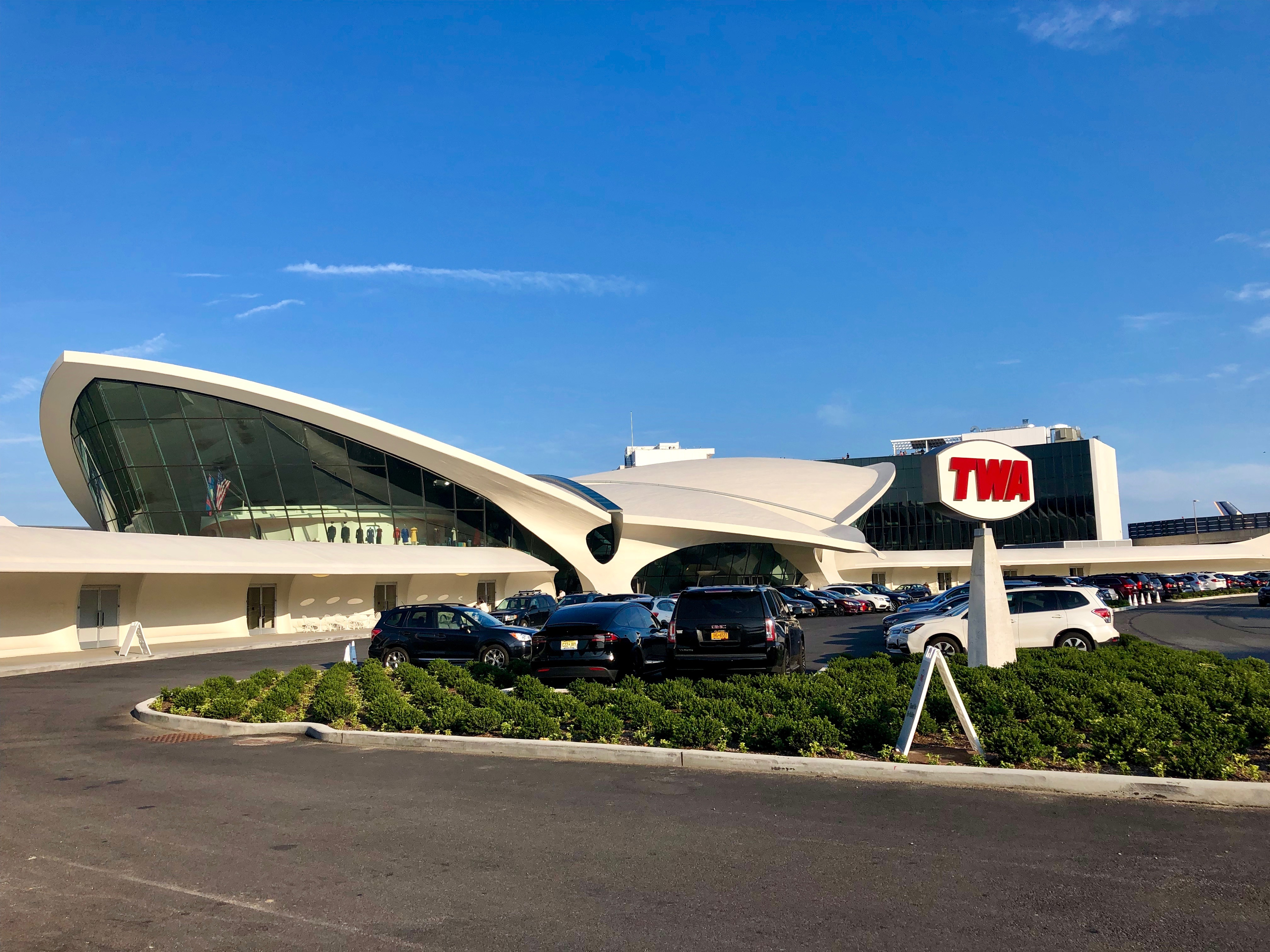
The exterior of the headhouse in 2019, after the TWA Hotel opened

The PANYNJ was seeking to convert the still-vacant headhouse into a hotel by 2011, and Open House New York (OHNY) began providing free tours of the unused headhouse that October. The OHNY tours took place once a year, and the headhouse soon became one of OHNY's most popular tour sites. The firm Beyer Blinder Belle finished restoring the headhouse in 2012. André Balazs was selected in 2013 to operate a hotel at the TWA Flight Center; Balazs, a fan of Saarinen's architecture, had planned a Standard Hotels location there. Balazs's proposal was abandoned due to disagreements with the PANYNJ, and another request for proposals was launched the following year. There were proposals to convert the headhouse into a capsule hotel operated by Yotel, or to use it as a terminal for Eos Airlines, but neither plan was accepted.

JetBlue and the hotel developer MCR Hotels jointly negotiated for the rights to operate a hotel there, and they won the lease in September 2015. Afterward, the historian Lori Walters used laser scanners to document the building's architectural details. Construction of JetBlue and MCR's TWA Hotel began in December 2016 and was funded by a $230 million loan. The structures on either side of the headhouse were demolished, and hotel-room towers were built on either side. The project also involved conducting asbestos abatement and replacing or restoring many original design details. Since the headhouse was a designated landmark, the renovation was eligible for federal and state tax credits, and the developers were required to consult with nearly two dozen government agencies. The hotel opened on May 15, 2019, and the TWA Flight Center has been part of the hotel since then.

== Impact ==
When plans for the TWA Flight Center were first announced, the building was detailed extensively in both the popular press and in architectural and aviation media, a trend that continued during construction. Despite being finished after many other terminals at JFK Airport, the TWA Flight Center incorporated many novel features for its time, which influenced the design of other airport terminals. TWA copied elements of the terminal's design for its World Travel Center at 299 Park Avenue in Manhattan, which opened in 1968. The company also used the terminal in marketing materials for years after completion.

The TWA Flight Center gradually became one of Saarinen's best-known works, alongside such structures as the GM Tech Center, CBS Building, the Dulles Airport Main Terminal, and Gateway Arch. Kornel Ringli said in 2015 that the TWA Terminal's design reflected Saarinen's tendency to customize designs according to his clients' needs, as the architect had done for the General Motors Technical Center, John Deere World Headquarters, and Kresge Auditorium. The architect Robert Venturi stated that Saarinen's designs deviated from the then-commonplace architectural philosophy "form follows function". Henry Grabar wrote for The Atlantic in 2017 that the TWA Terminal was "the most distinctive example of corporate-showpiece architecture", alongside other Saarinen works such as the General Motors complex and IBM Research's Thomas J. Watson Research Center.

=== Reception ===
==== Contemporary ====
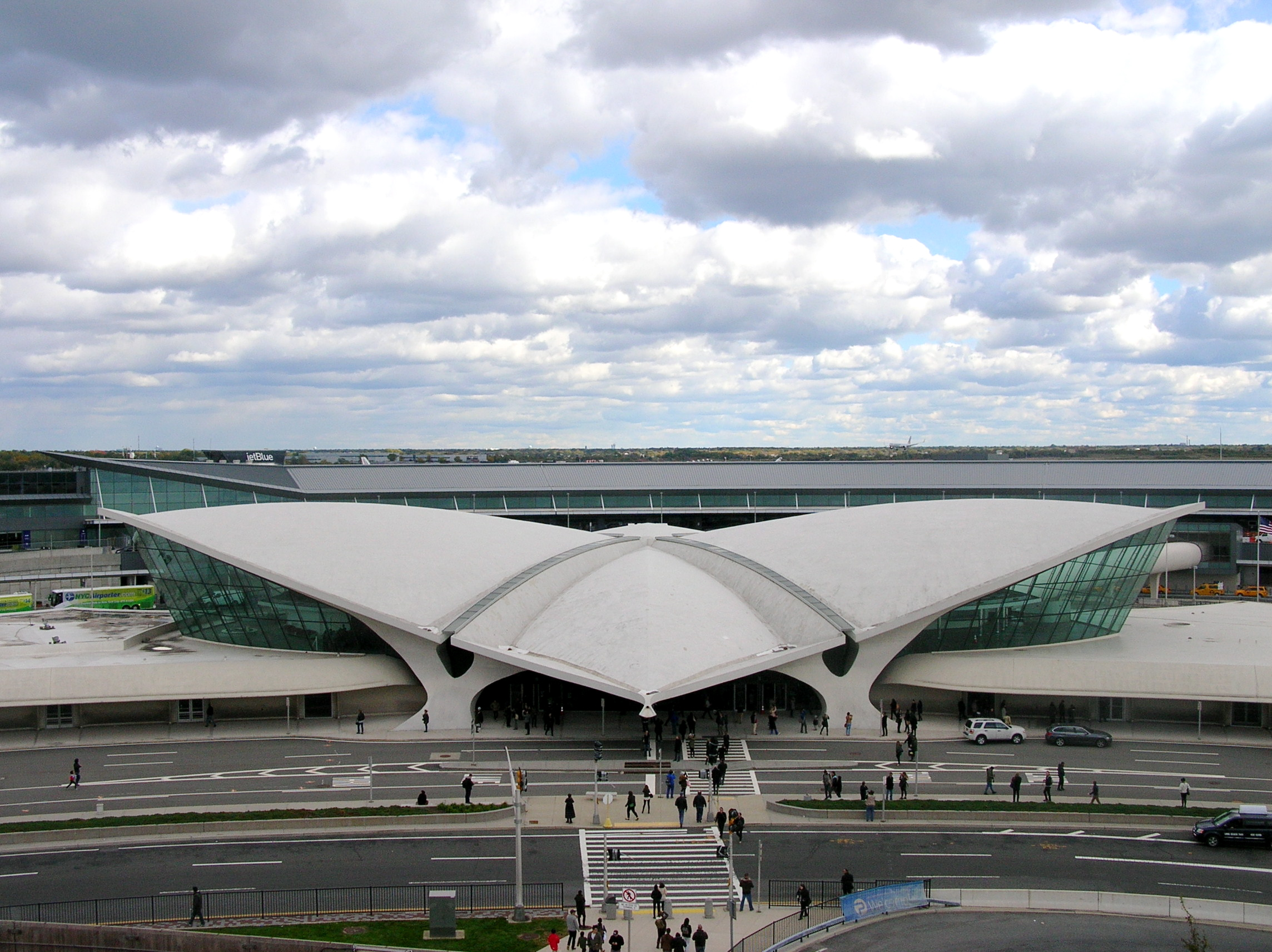
The headhouse's design (seen here in 2015) was likened to a "concrete bird".

Edward Hudson of The New York Times described the plans in 1957 as "hav[ing] a startling effect" for first-time visitors, but "not so revolutionary" inside. Another newspaper said the building was "planned to combine the functional realities of a jet-age air terminal with the aesthetic drama of flight". Just before the building's opening, The Christian Science Monitor wrote that architects had praised it "as perhaps the finest example of the creative genius of the late Eero Saarinen".

The completion of the terminal prompted significant architectural commentary, much of it positive. Ada Louise Huxtable, The New York Times' architecture critic, saw the TWA Flight Center as a bright spot in the "mediocrity" of JFK Airport, and Maude Dorr of Industrial Design magazine said the terminal "reflects the excitement of travel". Architectural Forum magazine, comparing the TWA Flight Center with other terminals at JFK Airport, wrote that "there can be little doubt about who won". The interior was also praised. The critic Edgar Kaufmann Jr. in 1962 called the interior "one of the few major works of American architecture in recent years that reaches its full stature as an interior", viewing it as "a festival of ordered movements and exhilarating vistas". Ken Macrorie of The Reporter compared the tarmac-facing waiting room to a railroad hub's waiting area and alluded to the similarities with the city's original Pennsylvania Station.

Media outlets compared the terminal's headhouse to "a bird in flight", despite Saarinen's insistence that the resemblance was coincidental. Architectural Forum (which praised the terminal) and Architectural Review (which criticized it) both characterized the design as a "concrete bird". The writer Douglas Haskell said the building's shape directly conveyed its purpose, akin to Disneyland's Sleeping Beauty Castle, saying that both buildings satiated the public's appreciation of symbolism. Saarinen did not object to the building's avian comparisons, saying that "people are forever looking for literary explanations". Privately, Saarinen described the structure as a "Leonardo da Vinci flying machine" and acknowledged that the building resembled a bird.

The design also had detractors, and the historian Alice T. Friedman retrospectively said that the TWA Terminal had "emerged as something of a lightning rod for contemporary audiences, only some of which had to do with architecture". One major critic was the historian Vincent Scully, who disliked Saarinen's use of "whammo shapes" at the TWA Flight Center and the Dulles Main Terminal, calling the former "pseudo-concrete choked with steel". The British critic Reyner Banham questioned the practicality of the design, which did not clearly link "function and symbol", but he said that the TWA Terminal was no worse than any other airport terminal. The Italian engineer and architect Pier Luigi Nervi was also skeptical of the design, saying that the structure was "too heavy and elaborate for the problem it seeks to solve". Friedman also wrote that detractors had negative impressions of the TWA Flight Center and Saarinen's other designs for large businesses, citing their capitalist connotations.

==== Retrospective ====
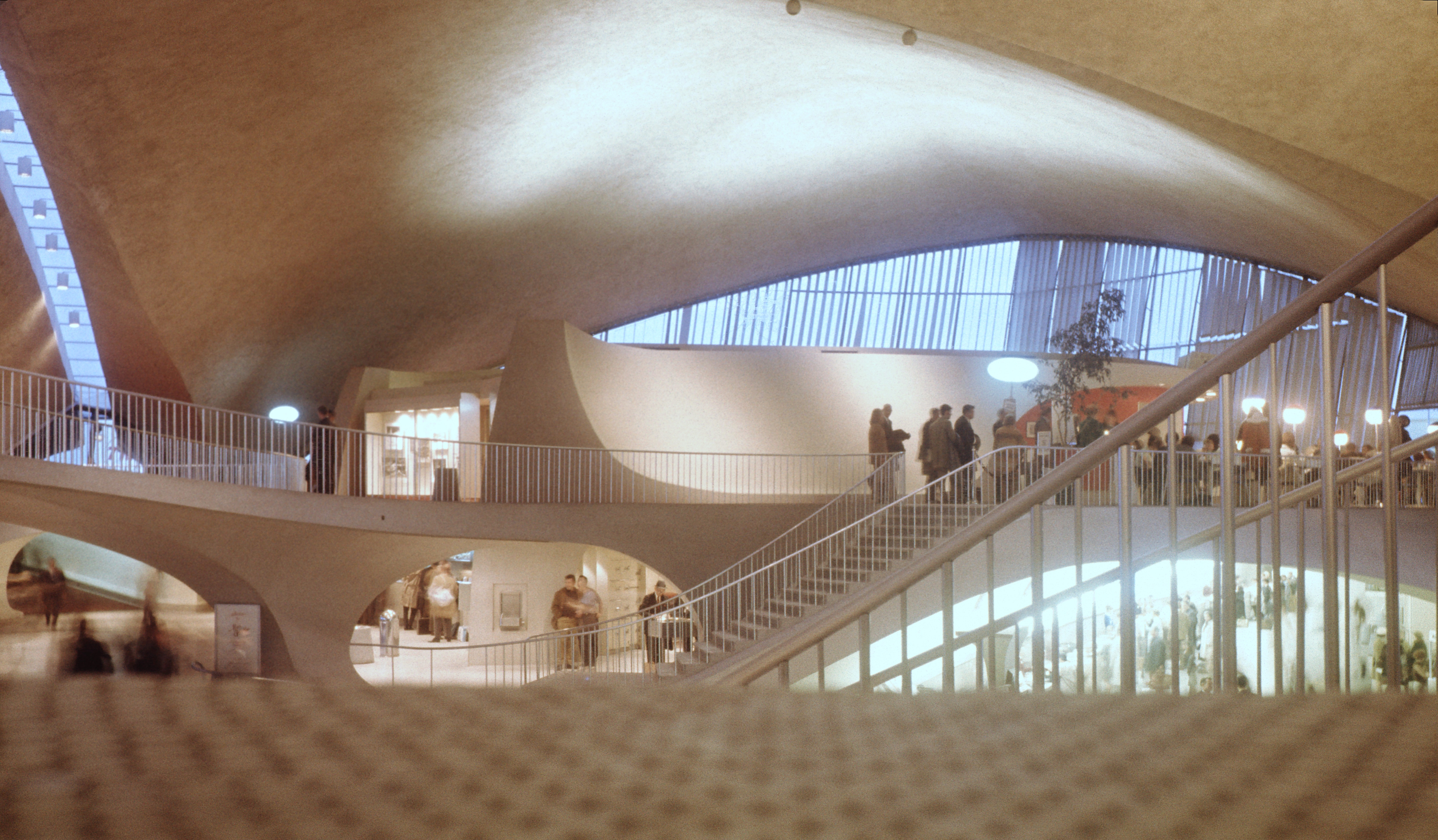
The architect Robert A. M. Stern called the headhouse a symbolic "Grand Central of the jet age".

Adulation for the original design continued after completion. In the 1990s, Progressive Architecture magazine said the TWA Flight Center "represented a high point not only in the design of air terminals, but in the exercise of corporate responsibility", while The Globe and Mail called it one of "the most potent images of '50s design". New York Times critic Herbert Muschamp called the TWA Flight Center "the most dynamically modeled space of its era", and the architect Robert A. M. Stern likened the headhouse to a "Grand Central of the jet age". Conversely, Paul Goldberger said in 1990 that the terminal was "but a shadow of its former self" because it had undergone so many alterations over the years.

The Engineering News Record said in 2003 that the building remained architecturally influential even as it became functionally outdated. In a 2005 book about Saarinen's work, Jayne Merkel said "the building did for TWA what the [Gateway] Arch [...] would eventually do for Saint Louis". According to Merkel, it was not until the PANYNJ proposed demolishing the terminal for T5 that "the full impact of the building was revealed". After the nearby Sundrome was demolished in 2011, David W. Dunlap of The New York Times wrote that the TWA Flight Center's "captivating and evocative design" explained why it had been preserved over the years. Joseph Giovannini of The Wall Street Journal wrote two years later that "the flowing lines and rising forms of the terminal are buoyant, all lift and no weight", contrasting it with Ludwig Mies van der Rohe's Seagram Building, while Chris Beanland of The Independent called the building a "swoop-roof marvel" that retained its 1962 look. Ringli wrote in 2015 that the building's appearance and TWA's marketing efforts made the terminal similar to "successful consumer goods with attractive packaging", even though the building quickly became obsolete. Two years later, Henry Grabar described the TWA Flight Center as being "the world's most famous airport terminal" and Saarinen's most widely-appreciated building.

After the TWA Hotel conversion was complete, Australian Design Review wrote that the original Flight Center's design had retained its quality throughout the years, and an observer for The American Scholar wrote that "Saarinen's terminal maintains its sublime power". Karrie Jacobs wrote for Architect magazine that the design "doesn't speak of technological advancement but of craft", describing the terminal as "quaint" and likening it to the curved forms of Saarinen's Ingalls Rink and Dulles Main Terminal. In a 2021 report, the scholar Song Jiewon wrote that the original structure had become "the physical manifestation of a vision of America's future". The architectural historian Michael J. Lewis described the building as "perhaps the world's finest example of an inhabitable sculpture", saying it still looked modern.

=== Awards and media ===
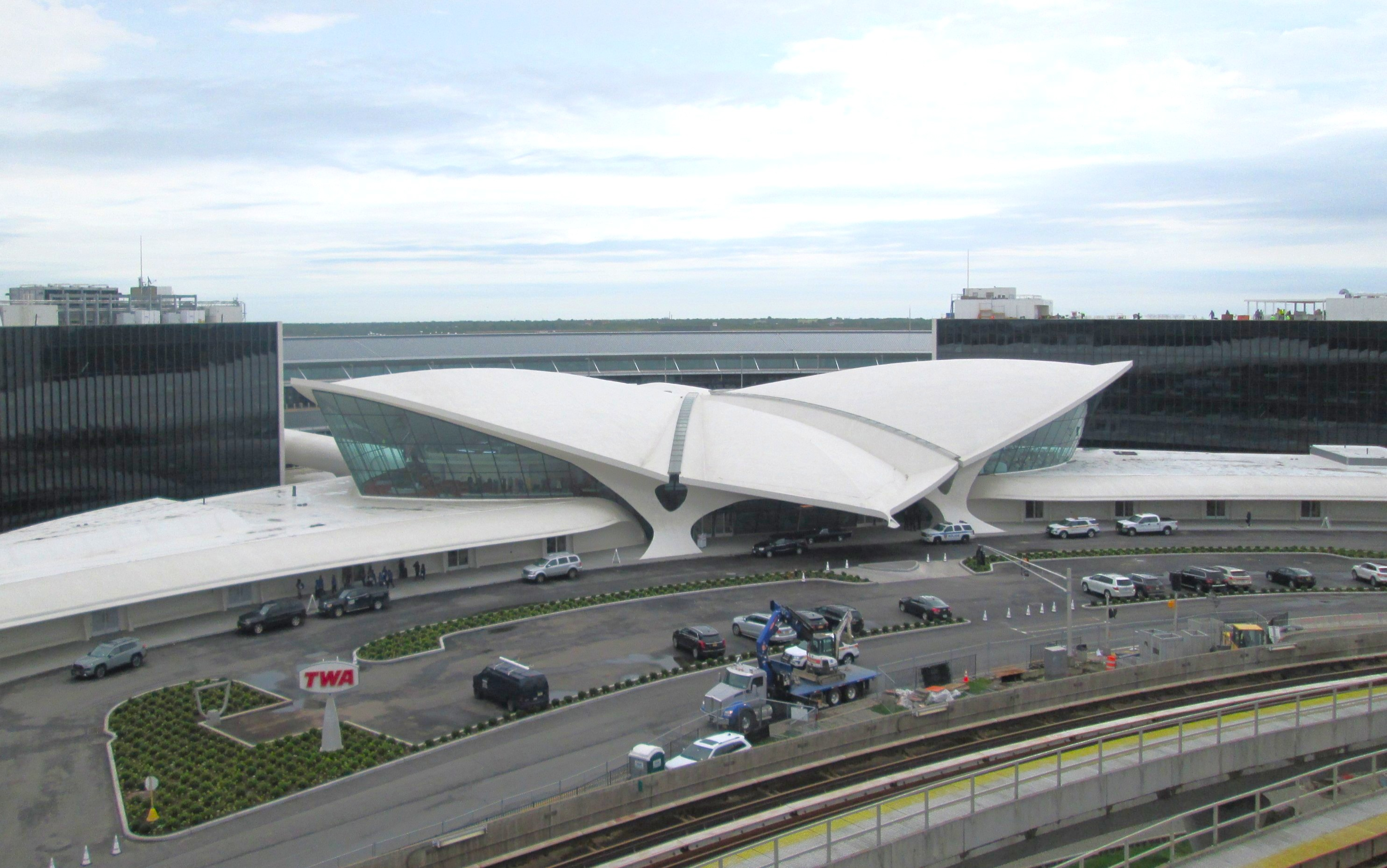
The terminal was ranked on the 2007 List of America's Favorite Architecture.

When the terminal was completed, it received numerous awards, including from the Queens Chamber of Commerce and the New York Concrete Industrial Board. Architectural Forum included the TWA Flight Center and the Pepsi-Cola Building as part of a 1962 exhibition of ten of the "world's most significant modern buildings". The American Institute of Architects (AIA) gave the terminal an Award of Merit in 1963, and it was featured internationally in magazines. In addition, Saarinen won the AIA Gold Medal posthumously in 1962.

The TWA Flight Center ranked 115th on the AIA's 2007 List of America's Favorite Architecture, which listed the top 150 buildings in the United States. Beyer Blinder Belle received an award for its 2012 restoration of the building, and the Preservation League of New York State also gave the building an excellence award. When the TWA Hotel conversion was completed, the project received the New York State Office of Parks, Recreation and Historic Preservation's 2019 preservation award.

The building was frequently used in popular media as a symbol of the jet age. A scale model of the terminal was displayed at the Museum of Modern Art in Manhattan while the building was under development. The photographer Balthazar Korab took multiple pictures of the terminal during its development. After the terminal was completed, it was documented in numerous photographs by Korab, Charles Eames, and Ezra Stoller, and it was a setting for fashion photo shoots. Shortly after the TWA Flight Center closed, the headhouse was used for the filming of Catch Me If You Can in 2002. JetBlue used a depiction of the Saarinen terminal's roof as the official logo for the opening of T5 in 2008. The building has been replicated in the New York Botanical Garden's annual holiday train show, and the TWA Hotel contains a model airport depicting the terminal and other nearby buildings at 1:400 scale.

=== Landmark designations ===
The LPC held public hearings on the possibility of designating the TWA Flight Center's exterior and interior as official city landmarks in 1993. The terminal's exterior and interior were designated as landmarks on July 19, 1994, and the New York City Council ratified the designation that October. (Note: Kornel Ringli conflates the 1994 LPC designation with the later NRHP designation, which occurred in 2005.) The designation preserves the headhouse and the older Flight Wing 2, but not the newer Flight Wing 1, and it focuses mostly on the building's architecture, rather than its historical significance or operational usefulness. Both TWA and the PANYNJ supported the exterior landmark designation, but PANYNJ officials testified that they would need to modify the building in the future. Although city landmarks typically cannot be modified without LPC approval, this rule does not apply to buildings owned by state or federal agencies such as the PANYNJ. As such, the designation did not protect the TWA Flight Center from modifications, a major point of contention when the building's redevelopment was proposed in the 2000s.

On September 7, 2005, the National Park Service listed the TWA Flight Center on the National Register of Historic Places (NRHP). The building had been determined eligible for listing on the register in 2001, but it was not added until after the building had been placed on the America's Most Endangered Places list. The NRHP listing also does not protect the building from modification.

== See also ==
- List of thin shell structures
- List of works by Eero Saarinen
- List of New York City Designated Landmarks in Queens
- National Register of Historic Places listings in Queens, New York
