= Model airport =

Scale model of an airport

A model airport is a scale model of an airport.

Model airports can be made to look very realistic, with many real airport features such as terminals, control towers, cargo terminals, hangars, passenger bridges and more.

Often, the collector will model their airport after a real-life airport. For example, a 1:400 scale model featured in Model Airliner Magazine recreates Hong Kong Kai Tak International Airport.

== History ==
The development of model airports is closely associated with the development of scale aircraft collecting and modelling. During the 1980s and 1990s, German manufacturers Schabak and Herpa produced die-cast aircraft models in standardized scales, including 1:600 and 1:500 respectively. Herpa also produced cars and airport service equipment in 1:500 scale, allowing aircraft and associated ground equipment to be represented at consistent proportions.

A 1:400 scale for die-cast aircraft models emerged in the mid-1990s. According to aviation-model collector Jorge A. Zajia, some of the earliest 1:400 models were produced by Dragon Wings, with a number of early models made for the Japanese company Hasegawa. During the late 1990s, additional manufacturers entered the 1:400 market and the hobby expanded. The availability of aircraft models and airport equipment in the same scales made them suitable for use in airport dioramas.

The construction of airport dioramas has increasingly incorporated custom modelling techniques. Zajia describes the use of 3D printing and other tools in the construction of detailed airport scenes, while also noting that collectors have begun producing small-scale aircraft, ground-support equipment and other airport components themselves using 3D printing.

Other airport dioramas have been displayed in museums. A model of the Pan Am Worldport, created by Keene, is displayed by the Pan Am Museum. According to AVPro Designs, the model was constructed using historical photographs and other material to reproduce the structure and architectural details of the former terminal.

In addition to private collections, airport dioramas have therefore developed into public displays that can document particular airports and periods in aviation history. The combination of standardized aircraft scales, increasingly detailed models and custom construction techniques has enabled model airports to represent not only aircraft but also the wider physical and operational environment of an airport.

== Aircraft ==
Collectors who make model airports may use die-cast models for their creation. A number of manufacturers produce die-cast aircraft models such as Aeroclassics, Herpa Wings, Dragon Models Limited, Gemini Jets, Phoenix Models, JC Wings, and NG Models.

Plastic snap-fit aircraft models are another type of model aircraft that can be incorporated into airport dioramas. These models are assembled from plastic components designed to fit together without requiring glue or painting, and are generally cheaper than die-cast models.

== Scale ==
=== Airport Scale ===
Model Airports can be constructed at different scales, with the scale determining the relative size of features such as aircraft, buildings, vehicles and other airport equipment. Airport products are available in scales such as 1:400 and 1:500, with other scales available too.

=== Aircraft Scale ===
Commonly produced scales include 1:144, 1:200, 1:400 and 1:500. For example, Herpa's aircraft model range includes models in various scales.

== Notable Model Airports ==
=== Knuffingen International Airport ===
In 2011, the world's largest model airport opened for public view at Miniatur Wunderland in Hamburg, Germany. The model, named Knuffingen International Airport, is based on Hamburg International Airport.

=== Madurodam Model Airport ===
Another popular park in Europe, Madurodam in the Netherlands includes a model airport featuring models of several airlines such as KLM, Emirates, Lufthansa, EVA Air, Turkish Airlines, UPS Airlines, Transavia, Thai Airways, Korean Air, Delta Air Lines, and an A380 of Singapore Airlines, alongside a DHL-branded Airbus A300. The Madurodam airport is based on Amsterdam's Schiphol Airport.

=== JFK Model Airport ===
In addition, the TWA Hotel in New York features a model airport that demonstrates the way the TWA airline's operation center used to look like at New York's John F. Kennedy Airport in the 1960s and 1970s. This model airport was made using TWA model aircraft and runways and buildings in the 1:400 scale.

== Online Resources ==
For video-based learning, a discussion on the Model Airliner Forum recommended the YouTube channels Model Airport Diorama, Model Aviation, Aviation 18, and Yuvi Studios as "good model airport channels to watch".

For aircraft-modelling news and information, Model Airliner Magazine covers model news, reviews, and model-airport projects.

For discussion and advice, the Model Airliner Forum and Diecast Aircraft forum have dedicated sections for model-airport projects and discussions, while the Scale Modelling Forum covers broader scale-modelling subjects including aircraft, dioramas and buildings.

== See also ==
- Diorama
- Model building
