= TWA Hotel =

Hotel in Queens, New York

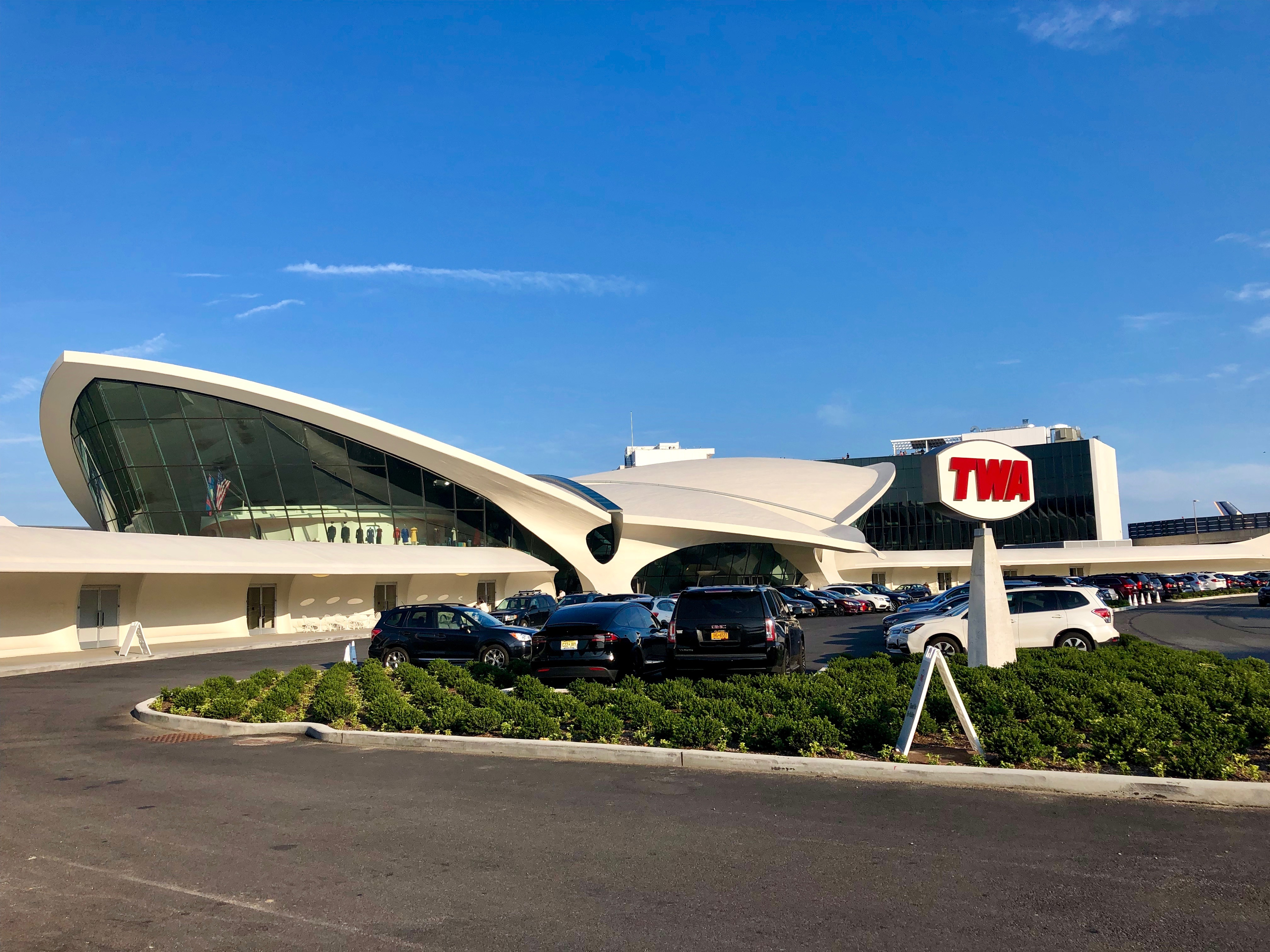
- TWA Hotel buildings, with TWA Flight Center in foreground

General information
- Status: Completed
- Architectural style: Midcentury modern
- Location: New York City
- Coordinates: 40.6458°N 73.7778°W
- Groundbreaking: December 15, 2016; 9 years ago
- Completed: Early 2019
- Opened: May 15, 2019; 7 years ago
- Owner: MCR Hotels

Design and construction
- Architects: Eero Saarinen (original); Beyer Blinder Belle / Lubrano Ciavarra Architects (redesign)
- Other designers: Stonehill Taylor (hotel rooms); INC Architecture and Design (basement event space), Jaros, Baum & Bolles (MEP), Arup Group (structural)

Other information
- Number of rooms: 512
- Number of restaurants: 6

Website
- www.twahotel.com

TWA Hotel is a hotel at John F. Kennedy International Airport in Queens, New York City. It uses the head house of the TWA Flight Center, designed by the architect Eero Saarinen and completed in 1962, and two flanking buildings added for the hotel in 2019, designed by Lubrano Ciavarra Architects. It contains a total of 512 rooms, as well as conference space, several restaurants, and an aviation history museum.

TWA Hotel was developed as part of a project to reuse the head house, which had stopped functioning as an air terminal in 2001. The site was developed by MCR Hotels, the third largest hotel owner in the United States. Groundbreaking took place on December 15, 2016, and the hotel opened on May 15, 2019. It is the only hotel operating within the boundaries of JFK Airport.

== History ==
After the TWA Flight Center closed in 2001, the Port Authority of New York and New Jersey sought to redevelop or reuse the terminal. The main building, or head house, was made a New York City designated landmark in 1994, and subsequently was added to the National Register of Historic Places in 2005. The head house went largely unused until it was ultimately incorporated into an expansion of Terminal 5, which was completed in 2008 and is occupied by JetBlue Airways.

In April 2015, The Wall Street Journal reported that JetBlue and hotel developer MCR Hotels were negotiating for the rights to turn the head house into a hotel. That July, New York Governor Andrew Cuomo confirmed that the Saarinen building would be converted into a new on-site hotel for the airport's passengers. The Port Authority awarded JetBlue and MCR the lease that September.

=== Construction ===
Groundbreaking took place on December 15, 2016, in a ceremony attended by Governor Cuomo, Queens Borough President Melinda Katz, and former employees of Trans World Airlines. The developers signed a 75-year lease with the state. During construction, workers had to excavate a new basement next to the existing headhouse; it took several months to drain the water from the basement. In addition, the hotel's acoustic engineers used a sound booth while trying to design the rooms' acoustics. The structures on either side of the headhouse were demolished, and hotel-room towers were built on either side. The project also involved conducting asbestos abatement and replacing many original details, such as the custom ceramic floor tiles and the 486 variously-shaped window panels, with replicas of the originals. The departure board from the original design was also restored. Since the headhouse was a designated landmark, the renovation was eligible for federal and state tax credits.

A topping out ceremony for the hotel's first tower was held in December 2017, followed by the topping out of the second tower in March 2018. The next month, a model hotel room built inside a JFK Airport hangar was shown to the press. The project received a $230 million construction loan from M&T Bank in May 2018.

A sales office and exhibition center, located on the 86th floor of One World Trade Center, was occasionally opened to the public while the renovation was ongoing. That October, Lockheed Constellation L-1649 Starliner N8083H "Star of America" was shipped to the hotel site for conversion into a cocktail bar. The Starliner arrived at the hotel site at the end of November 2018, and in March 2019 its fuselage was displayed in Times Square. The hotel started taking reservations in February 2019 in advance of a May opening.

=== Operation ===
The hotel opened on May 15, 2019. Shortly after the hotel opened, its TWA Food Hall was shuttered after failing a food inspection, though it reopened not long thereafter. In 2024, MCR refinanced the hotel with a $290 million loan from Barclays.

== Description ==
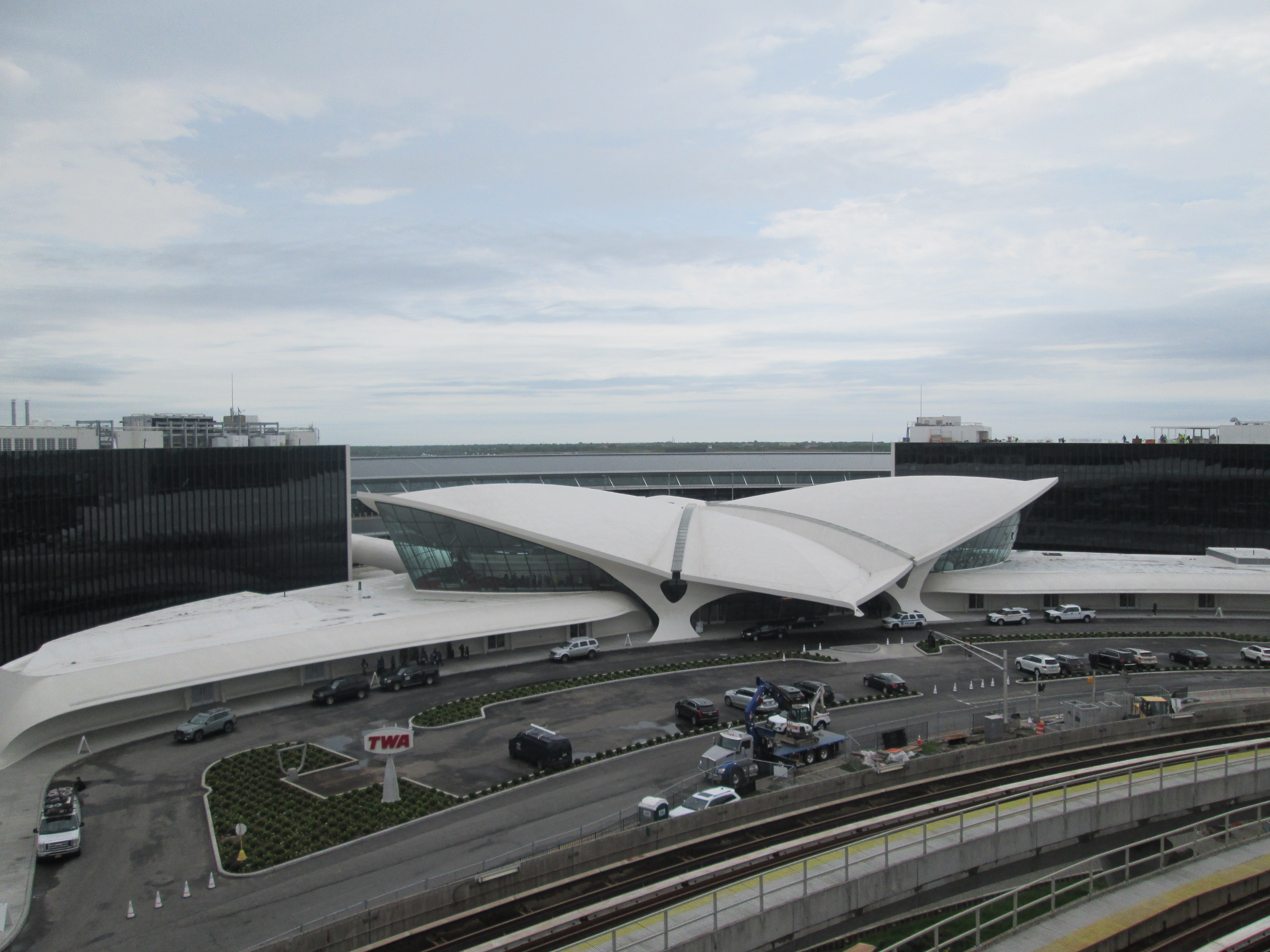
Front view of the TWA Hotel from a nearby parking lot; the AirTrain JFK track is in the foreground

The site was developed by MCR Hotels, which operates middle-to-budget hotels in the United States. It is the only hotel operating within the boundaries of JFK Airport. The original headhouse was designed by Eero Saarinen and Roche-Dinkeloo (the latter of which took over the design after Saarinen died). Beyer Blinder Belle is the architectural firm responsible for renovating the terminal, while Lubrano Ciavarra Architects designed the two new buildings. Stonehill Taylor designed the hotel rooms, and INC Architecture and Design designed the underground event space with 45 meeting rooms and a 7,000-square-foot (650 m^{2}) meeting hall. Arup provided structural engineering, with Jaros, Baum & Bolles delivering MEP services. In addition, Mathews Nielson was the landscape architect, while Cerami & Associates was the acoustic engineer.

Many of the TWA Flight Center's original details, such as the custom ceramic floor tiles and the 486 variously shaped window panels, were replaced with replicas of the originals. These details were intended to give the hotel a 1960s-era vibe, and include brass lighting, walnut-accented furnishings, and rotary phones. The hallways contain red carpeting, evocative of the color of the furniture in the original TWA lounge. The rooms also contain modern amenities such as blackout curtains and multiple-pane soundproof windows. The large departure board, a split-flap display made in Italy by Solari di Udine and which has been a feature of the building since the Flight Center's opening in 1962, was fully restored as part of the hotel project.

=== Rooms ===
Two buildings named Saarinen Wing and Hughes Wing, north and south of the T5 terminal structure, encircle the original headhouse to the east. Each wing is seven stories tall and connected to the original TWA Flight Center by means of the original headhouse's passageways. The two buildings contain a total of 512 rooms, which can be booked overnight, as well as for daytime stays of less than 14 hours. Each of the rooms is soundproofed due to their proximity to active runways. To shield the rooms from excessive noise, the towers' facades are made of 2,055 thick curtain wall panels measuring 4 1/3 by 9 2/3 feet (1.3 by 2.9 m) across, while the windows are all multi-paned. Visitors use a small iPad to create their room keys.

=== Amenities ===
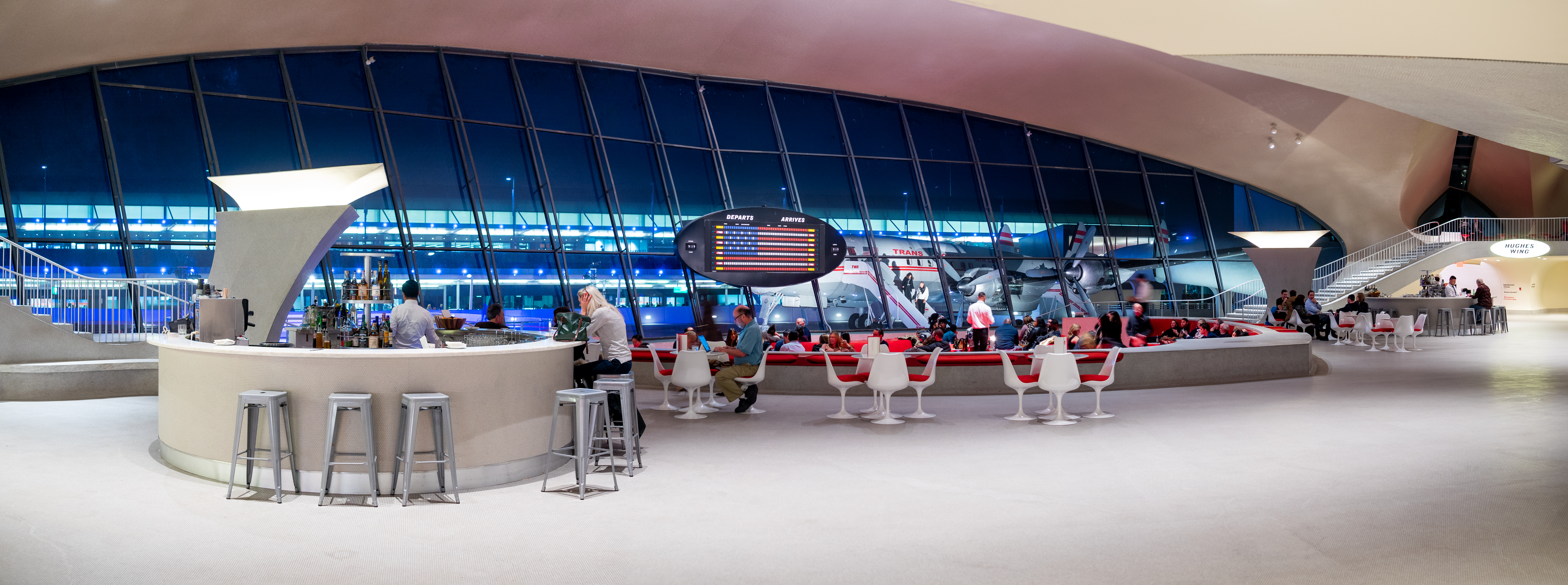
TWA Hotel lounge area

The hotel has multiple restaurants and a food hall. The TWA Hotel includes a cocktail lounge named Connie, installed inside a preserved Lockheed L-1649 Starliner, the last model of the Lockheed Constellation line of airliners. The hotel includes the Paris Café, a Jean-Georges Vongerichten restaurant, as well. Artifacts such as flight attendants' uniforms are displayed within the lobby of the TWA Flight Center, and there are two bars in the lobby, known as Coffee Bar and The Sunken Lounge. The TWA Food Hall includes five quick service food stalls and is also located in the lobby.

There are conference spaces and an aviation history museum in the hotel as well. The conference space is in the basement, 29 feet (8.8 m) below ground, with five suites and 45 meeting rooms. The conference areas can collectively fit 1,600 people, including one ballroom with a capacity of 1,400. There is a fitness room spanning 10,000 square feet (930 m^{2}). In addition, the hotel features a model airport that demonstrates the way the airline's operation center used to look like in the 1960s and 1970s. This model airport was made using TWA model aircraft, runways, and buildings at 1:400 scale. On the rooftop is an infinity swimming pool, which is accessible for an additional fee and is converted into the ski lodge-themed Runway Chalet during the winter. A bar is adjacent to the pool, and there is an observation deck with 10,000 square feet (930 m^{2}) of floor space.

== Critical reception ==
Travel Weekly wrote that, when the hotel opened, it received complaints of "unfinished rooms, messy hallways and disinterested service", the latter of which persisted for years after the hotel was complete. Sarah Firshein, reviewing the hotel for Condé Nast Traveler, wrote that the hotel "pulls together various passions—aviation and travel, architecture and design, hotel geekery, and food and dining culture", but that customer service was inconsistent and that some features (like the Wi-Fi) did not work consistently. A writer for Business Insider praised the period fixtures and decorations in the hotel.

In the September 2–9, 2019, issue of Time, the hotel was placed on the magazine's list of "The World's Greatest Places of 2019". The hotel was featured as the cover story in Interior Design magazine's September 2019 issue. The project also won the New York State Office of Parks, Recreation and Historic Preservation's 2019 preservation award. In 2024, aviation consultant Skytrax ranked TWA Hotel as North America's best airport hotel and the world's third-best airport hotel, a ranking the hotel retained in 2025.
