= Hudson Bay Capital Management =

American investment management company

Hudson Bay Capital Management LP
- Type: Private
- Industry: Investment management
- Predecessor: Gerber Asset Management
- Founded: June 2005; 21 years ago
- Founders: Sander Gerber; Yoav Roth
- Headquarters: Greenwich, Connecticut, U.S.
- Products: Hedge funds Alternative investments
- AUM: US$20 billion (December 2023)
- Number of employees: 241 (2024)
- Website: www.hudsonbaycapital.com

Hudson Bay Capital Management LP (HBC) is an American multi-strategy investment management firm headquartered in Greenwich, Connecticut, with additional offices in New York, Miami, London, Hong Kong and Dubai.

The firm has no relation to Canada's more well-known Hudson's Bay Company.

== Background ==
In 1997, Sander Gerber, an equity options trader at American Stock Exchange started his own proprietary firm named Gerber Asset Management. In 2005, he and Yoav Roth founded Hudson Bay Capital. At the same time, Gerber Asset Management was dissolved and Hudson Bay Capital absorbed its resources and employees.

In 2018, HBC opened a new office in London, followed by new operations in Dubai in 2023.

In March 2020, HBC introduced a special share class based on a drawdown structure to take advantage of sharp share price decreases following then-recent historic highs.

In February 2022, HBC received a $1.3 million state grant from the state of Connecticut to hire an additional 40 employees in Greenwich.

In July 2024, HBC increased the lockup period for investor capital from one to two years.

In November 2024, HBC released a 41-page document written by Stephen Miran that outlined a plan to restructure the global trading system. It quickly gained the attention on Wall Street. Analysts have hypothesized that the tariffs in the second Trump administration could be following this paper to end in the so-called "Mar-a-Lago Accord".

== Firm operations ==
HBC manages the bulk of its assets in the multi-strategy fund, but also invests in distressed debt and has engaged in shareholder activism. Companies the firm has invested in include New York Community Bank, Plug Power, and Transocean. It also provided a $155 million loan to MCR Hotels, Three Wall Capital, and Island Capital Group to refinance the Lexington Hotel .

HBC has a risk framework that it calls "The Deal Code System," which was mainly designed by Gerber. It is a scalable and repeatable portfolio management system for high-conviction investing with low correlation to markets. The system is set up with thresholds that manage the returns and losses of the firm. HBC generally does not use much leverage or borrowed money, or perform risky trades.

HBC's founder, Sander Gerber, developed the "Gerber Statistic" as a form of correlation which emphasizes movements when analyzing relationships among different assets. The Gerber Statistic is part of HBC's risk framework and the Deal Code System for portfolio strategy. Gerber collaborated with Harry Markowitz, the Nobel Laureate dubbed the "father of Modern Portfolio Theory". Together, in 2022, they published three research papers which showed how the Gerber Statistic performed better than the commonly used methods for estimating asset correlation.

== Investment History ==
In 2013, HBC was one of over 20 companies accused by the U.S. SEC of violating short-selling regulations, specifically Rule 105 of Regulation M. It settled with the SEC. The settlement cost HBC almost US$950,000 (equivalent to $1.3 million in 2025).

HBC was an investor in MoviePass in 2018.

HBC was an investor of Digital World Acquisition Corp., which later became Trump Media & Technology Group. Gerber himself had donated to the Donald Trump 2020 presidential campaign.

In 2021 the firm produced a return of 13.5%.

In February 2024, HBC raised over $800 million for a special situations fund. It was a closed-end drawdown fund that would last six years. One of its investments was New York Community Bank, which at the time was struggling and had received a $1 billion equity injection from a group of investors that included HBC.

=== Bed Bath & Beyond ===
In February 2023, HBC arranged a financing deal for Bed Bath & Beyond while the retailer was on the verge of bankruptcy. The deal was worth over $1 billion, with large potential upside and limited downside for HBC. A month later Bed Bath & Beyond ended the deal and instead tried to sell up to $300 million of common stock in the open market. In the process of the deal termination HBC had been able to sell 300 million new common shares to the open market, in part by capitalizing on Bed Bath & Beyond's popularity as a meme stock, before for Chapter 11 bankruptcy was eventually filed in April 2023.

In May 2024, Bed Bath & Beyond sued to recover over $300 million of HBC's trading profits from the deal to pay off its creditors. In early October 2025, a federal judge dismissed the lawsuit, finding the claims were implausible.

== See also ==
- Stephen Miran – American economist (born 1983)
