= Jennifer Nordquist =

American public policy expert

Jennifer "DJ" Nordquist

Deputy Director-General of the World Trade Organization
- Incumbent
- Assumed office October 1, 2025
- Appointed by: Ngozi Okonjo-Iweala
- Preceded by: Angela Ellard

U.S. Executive Director of the World Bank
- In office September 13, 2019 – January 25, 2021
- President: Donald Trump
- Preceded by: Matthew McGuire
- Succeeded by: Adriana Kugler

Personal details
- Born: Jennifer D Berinstein
- Education: Stanford University (BA); Northwestern University (MSJ)

Jennifer "DJ" Nordquist is an American public policy expert was appointed Deputy Director-General of the World Trade Organization in October 2025. Previously, she was the U.S. Executive Director of the World Bank.

At the Bank, she focused on the COVID-19 response, oversight, information and communication technology, energy, debt, human capital, and protection of women and girls. Prior to her role at the Bank, Nordquist was the Chief of Staff at the Council of Economic Advisers at the White House.

== Biography ==
A graduate of the Chapin School in New York City, Nordquist received her Bachelor of Arts from Stanford University and her Master of Science in journalism from Northwestern University.

From 2008 to 2017, Nordquist was Chief of Staff of the Brookings Institution’s Economic Studies program.

She had several roles during the administration of George W. Bush, including as Assistant Secretary (delegated) at the U.S. Department of Housing and Urban Development, a senior advisor in the Office of the Federal Coordinator for Gulf Coast Rebuilding, Deputy Chief of Staff at the Federal Deposit Insurance Corporation, and Acting Director and Deputy Assistant Secretary at the U.S. Department of Education.

Nordquist was the Chief of Staff at the Council of Economic Advisers under Chairman Kevin Hassett from 2017 to 2019. She again was a Counselor to Chairman of the Council of Economic Advisers Stephen Miran in 2025.

== Deputy Director-General, World Trade Organization ==
On July 28,2025, Ngozi Okonjo-Iweala appointed Nordquist as one of the four Deputy Directors-General of the World Trade Organization. She took office on October 1, 2025, and is responsible for the Trade Policy Review Division (similar to an IMF Article IV), the Rules Division, the Market Access Division, and the Finance and Corporate Services Division.

== United States Executive Director for the World Bank ==
On March 8, 2019, President Donald Trump nominated her to position of the United States Executive Director of the World Bank. The Senate confirmed her unanimously to the position on September 12, 2019. Nordquist was on the Audit Committee, the Committee on Governance, and the Committee on Development Effectiveness at the World Bank.
