= Tyler Morse =

American businessman (born 1974)

- Born: 1974 (age 51–52); Los Angeles, California
- Education: University of California, Berkeley; Harvard Business School
- Occupation: Businessperson
- Known for: Founder of MCR Hotels
- Board member of: Hospitality Solutions
- Spouse: Rebecca Morse

Tyler Morse (born 1974) is an American businessman and founder of MCR Hotels. He is an investor and board member of Swansea City A.F.C. and vice chairman of the board for Sabre Hospitality Solutions.

== Early life and education ==
Morse was born and raised in Los Angeles, California. At the age of 19 he traveled to Chile and became a ski instructor and also worked as a ski instructor in California. He attended the University of California, Berkeley and later Harvard Business School. He had also worked as a baggage handler at the Los Angeles International Airport.

== Career ==
Morse began his career at Ernst & Young as an accountant. He also spent time as an investment banker with Morgan Stanley. Prior to becoming a hotelier, he worked as the assistant to Starwoods Hotels CEO Barry Sternlicht and was also president of the spa and beauty company Bliss.

Morse founded MCR Hotels in 2006 and built its first hotel later that same year. The company has grown to be the third largest hotel owner in the United States, and owns properties which include The High Line Hotel, TWA Hotel, and BT Tower.

In 2024, Morse became an investor and board member of Swansea City. The following year he became Vice Chairman of the board for Sabre Hospitality Solutions.

== Personal life ==
Morse is married to Rebecca Morse.
