= Adriana Kugler =

American economist (born 1969)

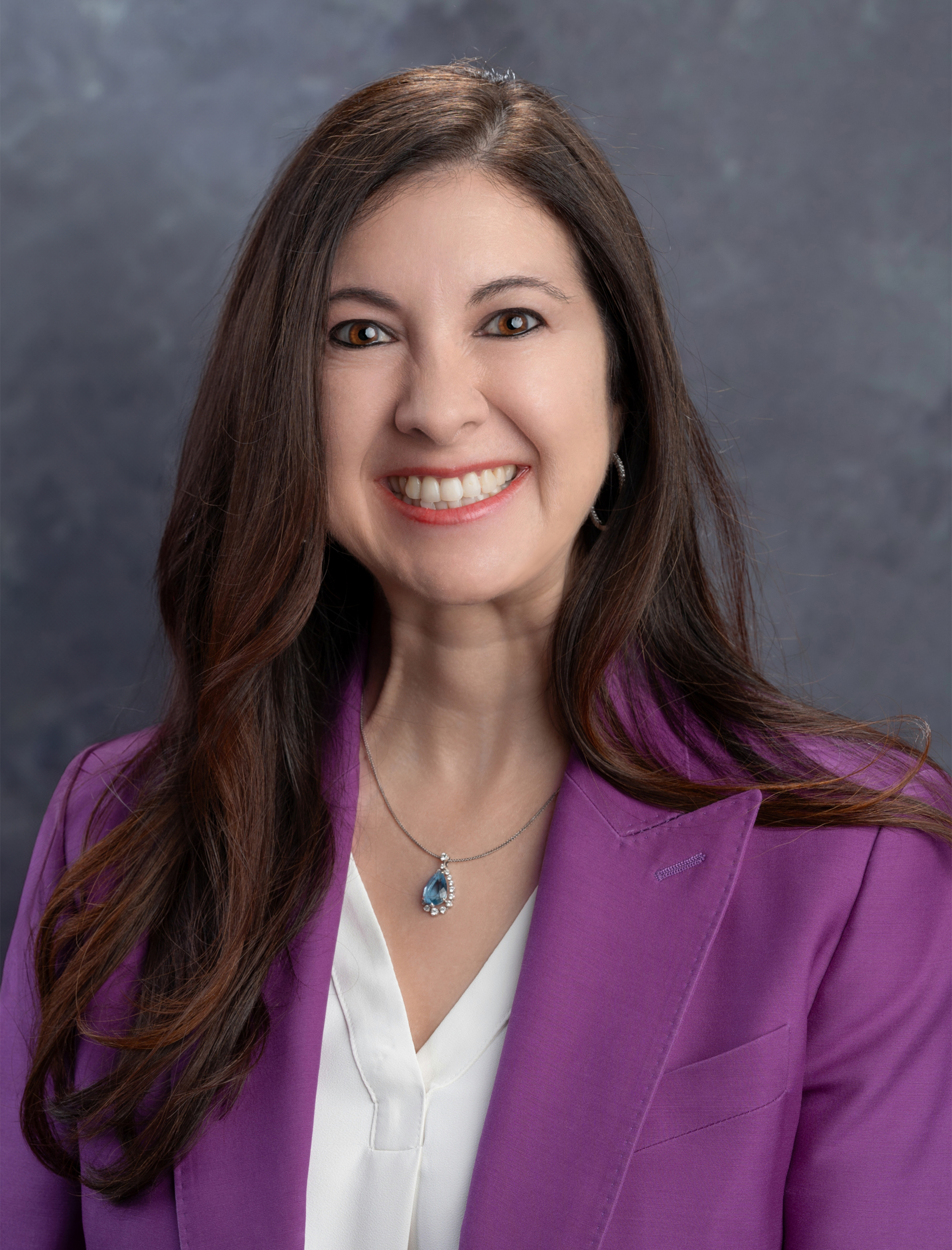
- Official portrait, 2023

Member of the Federal Reserve Board of Governors
- In office September 13, 2023 – August 8, 2025
- President: Joe Biden; Donald Trump
- Preceded by: Lael Brainard
- Succeeded by: Stephen Miran

United States Executive Director of the International Bank for Reconstruction and Development
- In office May 16, 2022 – September 13, 2023
- President: Joe Biden
- Preceded by: Jennifer Nordquist
- Succeeded by: Vacant

Chief Economist of the United States Department of Labor
- In office September 6, 2011 – January 4, 2013
- President: Barack Obama
- Preceded by: Betsey Stevenson
- Succeeded by: Jennifer Hunt

Personal details
- Born: October 23, 1969 (age 57) Hennepin County, Minnesota
- Party: Democratic
- Education: McGill University (BA); University of California, Berkeley (MA, PhD)

Adriana Debora Kugler (born October 23, 1969) is an American economist who served as a member of the Federal Reserve Board of Governors from September 13, 2023, to August 8, 2025, becoming the first Hispanic person to serve on the board. She previously was U.S. executive director at the World Bank, nominated by President Joe Biden and confirmed by the U.S. Senate in April 2022. She is a professor of public policy at Georgetown University's McCourt School of Public Policy. She was the Chief Economist to U.S. Labor Secretary Hilda L. Solis from September 6, 2011 to January 4, 2013.

== Early life and education ==
Kugler is of Jewish and Hispanic descent. She received her Bachelor of Arts degree from McGill University in 1991, graduating with first class joint honors in economics and political science. In 1997, she was awarded her Ph.D. by the University of California, Berkeley; her advisors were Nobel laureate George Akerlof, Nada Eissa, and David K. Levine.

== Academic and research career ==
Kugler was Vice-Provost for Faculty for Georgetown University from 2013 to 2016 and is currently a full professor at the McCourt School of Public Policy. She was founder and co-director of the International Summer Institute on Policy Evaluation between 2010 and 2013.

Prior to coming to Georgetown, she was a full and associate professor at the economics departments at the University of Houston and at Pompeu Fabra University in Barcelona. Kugler was a research associate with the National Bureau of Economic Research in the Labor Studies program and a research fellow of the Center for Economic Policy Research (CEPR) in London, the Institute for the Study of Labor (IZA) in Bonn, the Centre for Research and Analysis of Migration (CReAM) in London, and the Center for the Study of Poverty and Inequality at Stanford University and senior fellow at the Center for American Progress.

Kugler has been on the editorial boards of the Industrial and Labor Relations Review, The Journal of Labor and Development, the British Journal of Industrial Relations, Labour Economics, Applied Economics Quarterly, and Economia Journal.

Kugler's research includes labor markets and policy evaluation in developed and developing countries. She continues to research and work the causal impacts of with policies that help stimulate youth employment, as well as observe the effect varieties of policies have on worker mobility and job quality. Her research includes labor markets and policy evaluation in developed and developing countries. Her work also includes contributions on the role of public policies (including payroll taxes, employment protections, occupational licensing, and unemployment insurance), unemployment, and immigration.

Kugler was the 2007 recipient of the John T. Dunlop Outstanding Scholar Award from the Labor and Employment Relations Association, in recognition of her research contributions to the field of labor and industrial relations.

In 2010, one of her papers, "Trade Reforms and Market Selection: Evidence from Manufacturing Firms in Colombia" won first prize for Best Contribution in the area of "Globalization, Regulations and Development" from the Global Development Network.

In 2011, Kugler served in the Obama administration as Chief Economist of the U.S Department of Labor up until 2013.

Kugler was on the National Academies of Sciences, Engineering, and Medicine's Board on Science, Technology and Economic Policy (STEP).

She was chair-elect in 2019 and Chair in 2020 of the Business and Economics Statistics Section of the American Statistical Association.

Kugler was on the Bureau of Labor Statistics Technical Advisory Committee from 2016 to 2019.

She was on the National Science Foundation Committee of Visitors for the Division of Social and Economic Sciences in 2016.

Kugler was an elected member of the Executive Committee of the Latin American and Caribbean Economic Association from 2015 to 2019.

She was an elected member of the Executive Committee of the European Association of Labour Economists for six years.

She has been the recipient of numerous research grants for studies in areas that include the role of public policies, unemployment, and immigration on labor markets and policy evaluation in developed and developing countries.

Kugler is back from a leave from absence which started in September, 2025, and is now back since August 11th, 2025 where she is a full professor at the McCourt School of Public Policy and Economics

=== Affiliations with research networks ===
- Research Associate, National Bureau of Economic Research (NBER). Labor Studies Group: Faculty Research Fellow, 2004-2009 and Research Associate, 2009-April 2022 and October 2025-Present
- National Bureau of Economic Research (NBER) Children’s Group: Research Associate, July 2016- April 2022 and October 2025-Present
- Research Fellow, Center for the Study of Poverty and Inequality, Stanford University, 2006-Present (except April 2022-August 2025)
- Research Affiliate, Centre for Economic Policy Research (CEPR), 2002-April 2022, and October 2025-Present
- Research Fellow, Rockwool Foundation-Berlin, 2025-Present

== Political appointments ==
She served as chief economist of the U.S. Department of Labor between 2011 and 2013, where she worked actively on developing policies and proposals on unemployment insurance, training programs, retirement benefits, overme pay and minimum wages, immigration, disability insurance and occupational safety regulations.

On August 4, 2021, President Joe Biden nominated Kugler to be the U.S. Executive Director of the International Bank for Reconstruction and Development, the lending arm of the World Bank. Her initial nomination was withdrawn by President Biden on September 20, 2021 because of a typo in her name and she was renominated thatti same day.

President Biden renominated her on January 4, 2022 to be considered under the new session of Congress. Kugler was favorably reported by the Senate Foreign Relations Committee on December 15, 2021 and again on March 8, 2022. The entire Senate confirmed her nomination by voice vote on April 7, 2022.

=== Federal Reserve ===
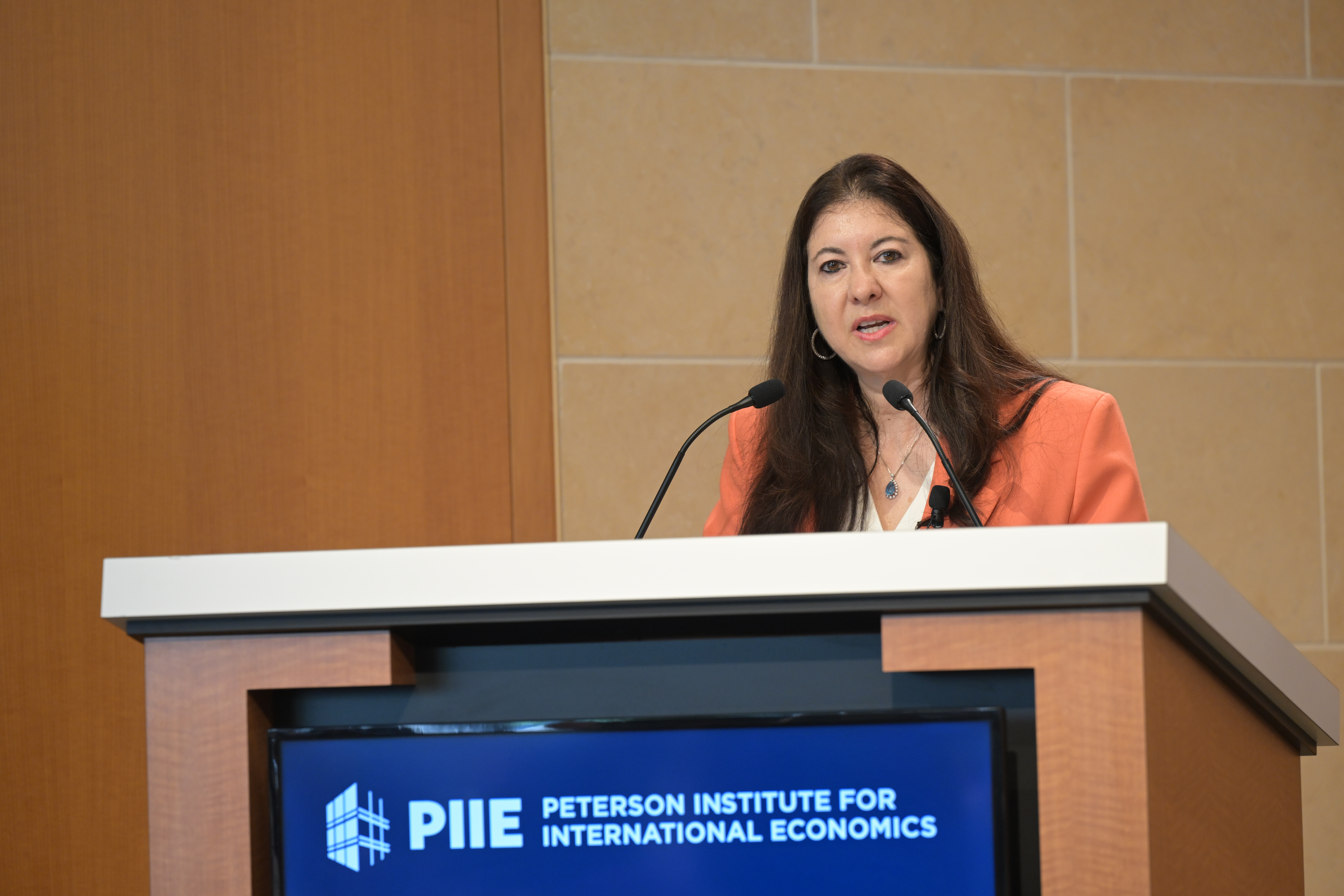
Governor Kugler speaks at Peterson Institute for International Economics in 2024

Biden nominated Kugler to the Federal Reserve Board of Governors in May 2023. She was confirmed by the Senate on September 7, 2023 and sworn in on September 13.

On June 5, 2025, Kugler supported keeping interest rates unchanged because she was concerned that higher tariffs would increase inflation.

On August 1, 2025, Kugler announced that she would resign from the Board effective August 8, before the January 2026 expiration of her term. She did not state a reason and said that she would return to Georgetown University as a professor in the fall. A November 2025 ethics disclosure showed that Gov. Kugler's husband traded equities during the blackout period ahead of Board meetings. In that financial disclosure, she stated that four trades in individual stocks "were carried out by my spouse, without my knowledge, and I affirm that my spouse did not intend to violate any rules."

== Recognition ==
- 2025 ASHE Academic Achievement Award, American Society of Hispanic Economists, October 2025
- 100 Most Influential Women In U.S. Finance, March 2024 and March 2025
- Chase Award for her leadership and contributions to the Evolution of Multilateral Development Banks, U.S. Department of the Treasury, June 2023

== Selected publications ==
Kugler's work has been published in the top general interest and specialized journals in economics and public policy, including the American Economic Review, the Review of Economic & Statistics, the American Economic Journal: Applied Economics, the Economic Journal, the Journal of Labor Economics, the Journal of Public Economics, the Journal of Development Economics and the Journal of Policy Reform. Her research has been covered in multiple reports, including the World Development Report published by the World Bank, and the annual development reports published by the Inter-American Development Bank and the OECD.

- "Trade and Market Selection: Evidence from Manufacturing Plants in Colombia," (with Marcela Eslava, John Haltiwanger, and Maurice Kugler), Review of Economic Dynamics, 16.1 (2013): 135–158.
- "Katrina's Children: Evidence on the Structure of Peer Effects from Hurricane Evacuees," (with Scott Imberman and Bruce Sacerdote), American Economic Review, 102(5): 2048–82, August 2012.

Featured in the Houston Chronicle on September 12, 2009, the San Antonio Express News on September 12, 2009, and the Houston Business Journal on September 11, 2009.

- "Employment Consequences of Restrictive Permanent Contracts: Evidence from Spanish Labor Market Reforms," (with Juan F. Jimeno and Virginia Hernanz), CEPR Working Paper No. 3724, 2003 (revision at Journal of the European Economic Association).

Featured in the World Development Report 2006 and 2007.

- "Factor Adjustments after Deregulation: Panel Evidence from Colombian Plants," (with Marcela Eslava, John Haltiwanger and Maurice Kugler), Review of Economics and Statistics, May 2010, 92(2).
- "Employment and Social Security: An Alternative View," in Bjorn Lomborg, ed., Latin American Development Priorities: Costs and Benefits, Cambridge University Press, 2010.
- "Market Reforms, Factor Reallocation, and Productivity Growth in Latin America," (with Marcela Eslava, John Haltiwanger, and Maurice Kugler), in Norman Loayza and Luis Serven, eds. Business Regulation and Economic Performance, World Bank and Stanford University Press, 2010.
- "Labor Market Effects of Payroll Taxes in Developing Countries: Evidence from Colombia," (with Maurice Kugler), Economic Development and Cultural Change, January 2009, 57(2).
- "Rural Windfall or Resource Curse? Coca, Income and Civil Conflict in Colombia," (with Joshua Angrist),

Lead Article in Review of Economics and Statistics, May 2008, 90(2).

- "Do Employment Protections Reduce Productivity? Evidence from U.S. States," (with David Autor and Bill Kerr), Economic Journal, June 2007, 117.
- "The Effects of Employment Protection in Europe and the U.S.," Opuscle, CREI, 2007.
- "Plant Turnover and Structural Reforms in Colombia" (with Marcela Eslava, John Haltiwanger, and Maurice Kugler), IMF Staff Papers, 2006, 53.
- "Effects of Employment Protection and Product Market Regulations on the Italian Labor Market," (with Giovanni Pica), in Julian Messina, Claudio Michelacci, Jarkko Turunen, and Gylfi Zoega, Eds., Labour Market Adjustments in Europe. Edward Elgar, 2006.

Featured in the World Development Report 2005.

- "Doctors without Borders? Relicensing Requirements and Negative Selection in the Market for Physicians" (with Robert Sauer), Journal of Labor Economics, July 2005, 23(3).
- "Wage-Shifting Effects of Severance Payments Savings Accounts in Colombia," Journal of Public Economics, February 2005, 89(2–3).

Featured in the World Development Report 2005, IDB's Report on the Economic and Social Progress of Latin America 2004, and in the OECD's Employment Outlook 2004.

- "The Effect of Structural Reforms on Productivity and Profitability Enhancing Reallocation: Evidence from Colombia" (with Marcela Eslava, John Haltiwanger, and Maurice Kugler), Journal of Development Economics, December 2004, 75(2).

Featured in the World Development Report 2005.

- "Effects of Trade on Job Reallocation: Evidence from Latin America" (with John Haltiwanger, Maurice Kugler, Alejandro Micco, and Carmen Pages), Journal of Policy Reform, December 2004, 7(4).
- "The Effect of Job Security Regulations on Labor Market Flexibility: Evidence from the Colombian Labor Market Reform," in James J. Heckman and Carmen Pagés, Eds., Law and Employment: Lessons from Latin America and the Caribbean. Chicago: The University of Chicago Press, 2004.

Featured in the World Development Report 2006 and 2007, and IDB's Report on the Economic and Social Progress of Latin America 2004.

- "The Reversal of Inequality in Colombia, 1978-95: A Combination of Persistent and Fluctuating Forces" (with Cesar Bouillón, José Leibovich, Jairo Núñez, and Carlos Eduardo Vélez) in François Bourguignon, Francisco Ferreira, and Nora Lustig, Eds., The Microeconomics of Income Distribution Dynamics in East Asia and Latin America. Oxford: Oxford University Press, 2004.

Featured in the World Development Report 2004.

- "Protective or Counter-Productive? Labor Market Institutions and the Effect of Immigration on EU Natives" (with Joshua Angrist), Economic Journal, June 2003, 113.

Reprinted in Andrew Morris and Samuel Estreicher, Eds., Cross-Border Human Resources, Labor and Employment Issues. Hague: Kluwer Law International, 2005.
Featured in the Economist's Economics Focus July 7th 2005, World Development Report 2007, Expert Report to United Nations' National Assembly on International Migration and Development 2008.

- "The Impact of Firing Costs on Turnover and Unemployment: Evidence from the Colombian Labor Market Reform," International Tax and Public Finance Journal, August 1999, 6(3).

Reprinted in Enrique Bour, Daniel Heymann and Fernando Navajas, Eds., Latin American Economic Crisis. Hampshire, UK: Palgrave MacMillan, 2004.
Featured in the Presidential Address of the Society of Labor Economists 2001.

- "What Factors Contributed to Changes in Employment During and After the Great Recession," (with Ammar Farooq) Journal of Labor Policy, 4:3, February 28, 2015.
- "Beyond Job Lock: Impacts of Public Health Insurance on Occupational and Industrial Mobility," (with Ammar Farooq), January 2016.
- "The Effect of Providing Breakfast on Student Performance: Evidence form an In-Class Breakfast Program" (with Scott Imberman), Journal of Policy Analysis and Management, Summer 2014, 33(3).
- "Labor Market Analysis and Labor Policy Making in the Nation's Capital," Industrial and Labor Relations Review, Spring 2014, 67(3).

For the above articles, as well as more complete lists of Published Articles and Research Papers (and links to her research papers), reference may be made to Kugler's internet pages at the University of Houston and McCourt School of Public Policy.

Government offices
Preceded by Lael Brainard	Member of the Federal Reserve Board of Governors; 2023–2025	Succeeded by Stephen Miran
