= Cruisers Yachts =

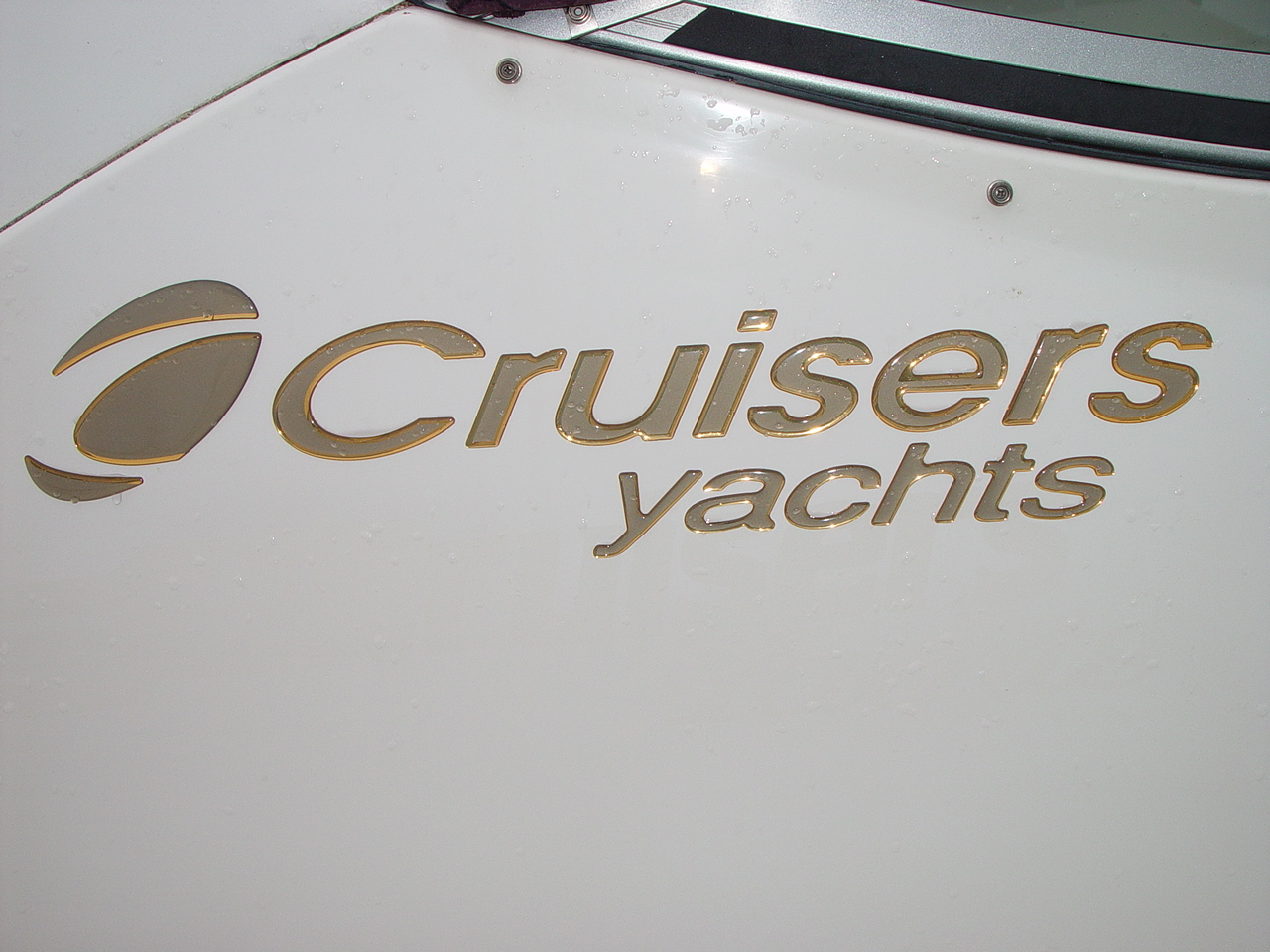
Cruisers Yachts Logo

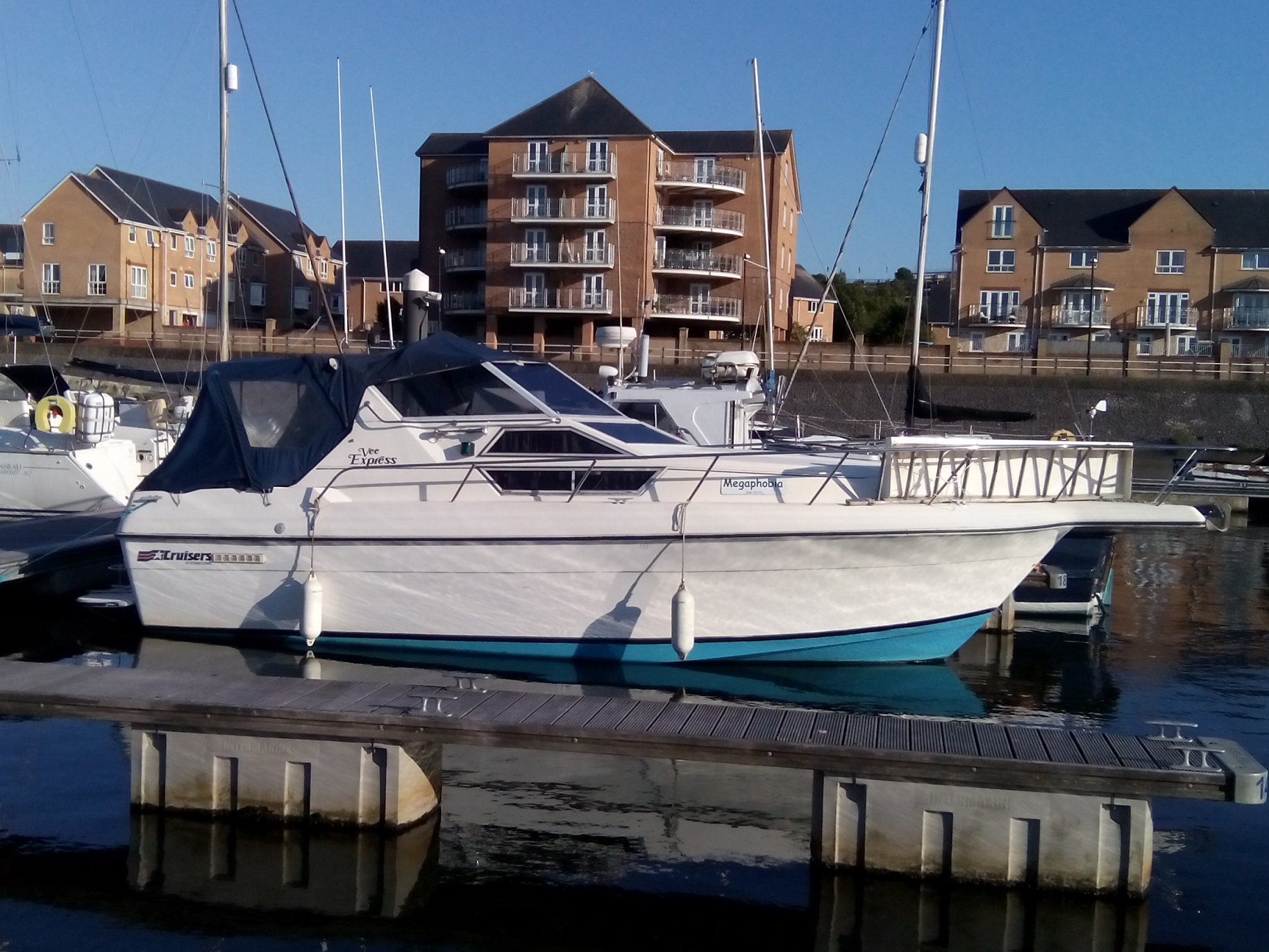
A 1990 Cruisers International --- Vee Express 267

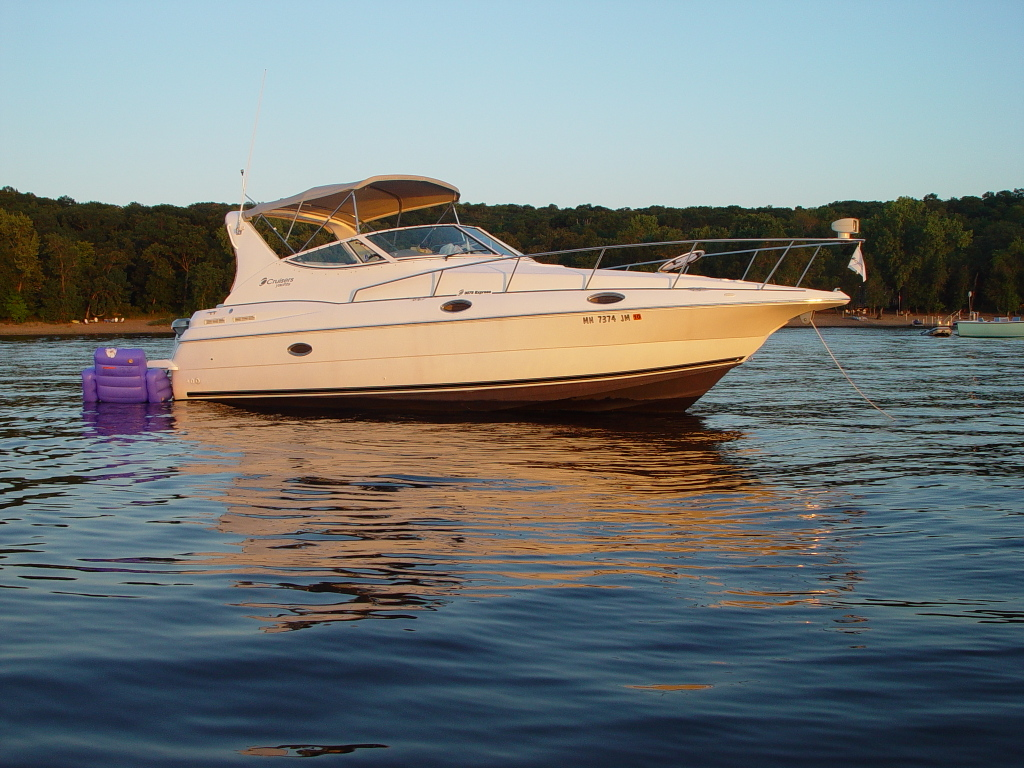
A 2002 Cruisers Yachts 3075 Express

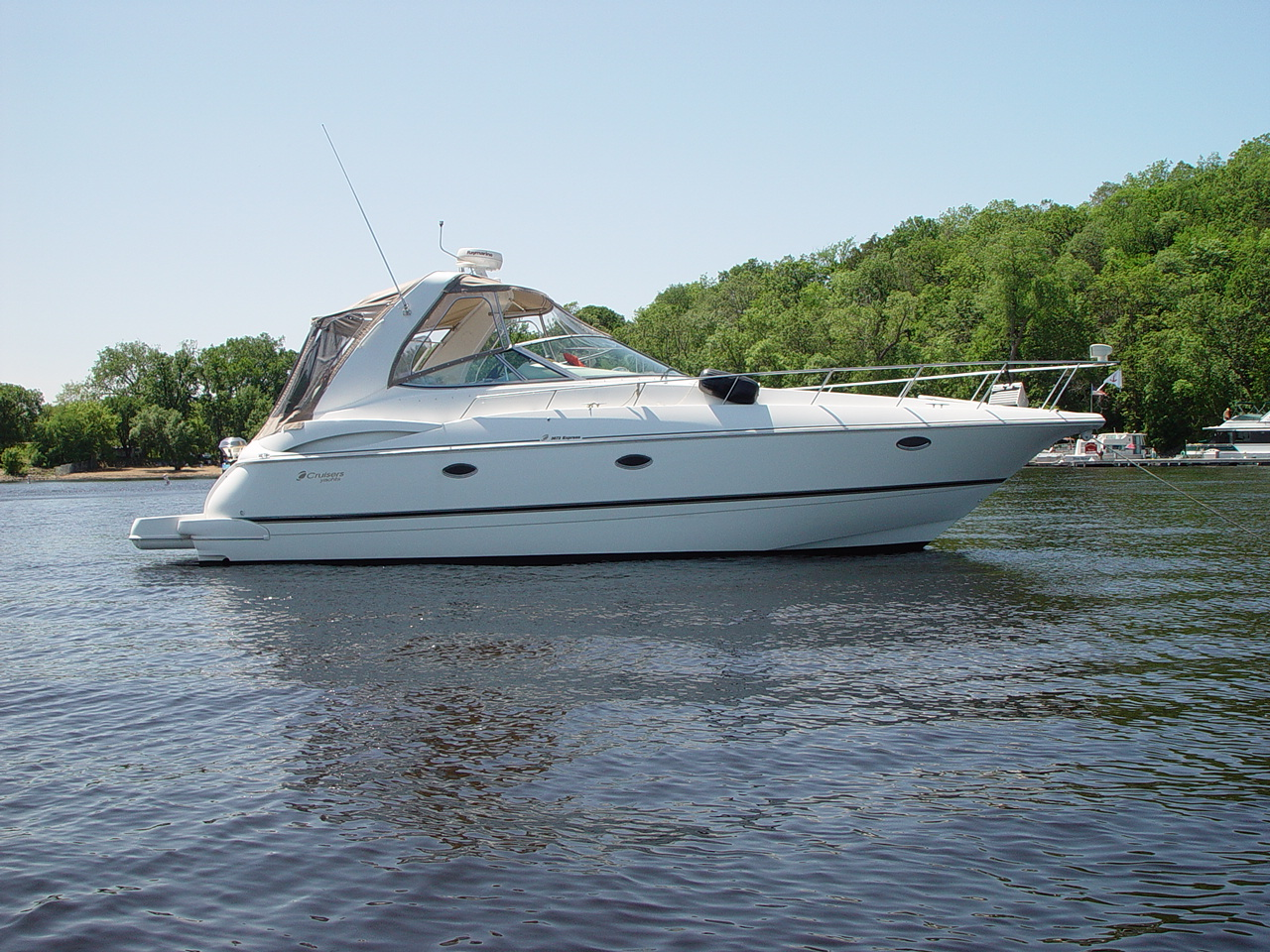
A 2000 Cruisers Yachts 3672 Express

Cruisers Yachts is a brand of pleasure boats owned by MarineMax. The company builds boats ranging from 33 feet - 60 feet, and is headquartered in Oconto, Wisconsin. The company was one of the first boat builders to utilize the Volvo Penta IPS propulsion system.

== History ==
The company was founded in 1953 in Oconto by Ray, Glenn, brothers Roy and Grant, and brothers Bob and Ted Thompson. They were second-generation members of the Thompson family, involved in boat building at Peshtigo, WI and Cortland, New York. Roy and Grant were following in their father Chris's footsteps, as he had co-founded the Thompson Bros. Boat Mfg. Company in 1904 in nearby Peshtigo, Wisconsin. The company was originally known as "Cruisers Incorporated", or "Cruisers Inc." for short. They set up operations in the former Holt Lumber planing mill in Oconto. In the first year of operation, Cruisers constructed 14- and 16-foot lapstrake boats, and sold them to the Thompson Bros. Boat Mfg Co. with the Thompson name badge on the hulls. The first shipment left the Oconto factory on November 18, 1953. The first cabin-cruiser model was a 19-foot 3-inch lapstrake boat, which was introduced at the 1954 New York Boat Show; she featured a sink, alcohol stove, water closet, cushioned bunks to sleep four, cabin lights and a collapsible table.

In 1956, the first Cruisers product catalog debuted. The company was producing 60 boats per week then, and the work force had grown from 20 to 101, over 5 times its size, in three years. By 1961, 300 people were employed at the company. At this time they were producing 12 different models, ranging from 14 feet to 20 feet long. Cruisers claimed to be the foremost lapstrake boat builder in the world. In 1959 and 1960, they made 3,000 boats annually. Then the bottom fell out of the wooden-boat market.

A reorganization of the three Thompson family owned boat plants at Peshtigo, Cortland, NY and Oconto went into effect on 1 January 1959. Cruisers, Inc. became the sole property of Roy and Grant Thompson. Ray Thompson and family gained control of Thompson Bros. boat Mfg. Co. at Peshtigo. A new corporation was formed at Cortland, NY to run that operation; Thompson Boat Company of New York, Inc. with Bob, Ted and Glenn Thompson as owners.

As fiberglass boats hit the scene, customers abandoned wooden vessels en masse. Cruisers resisted the change, with the Thompsons believing firmly that a well-built wooden boat would outperform and outlive any fiberglass version of itself. Cruisers sold less than 800 boats in the 1965 season, and wooden boats were eliminated from the line by the end of 1966.

In 1982, Cruisers acquired the fiberglass portion of the boat division of Mirro Aluminum Company.

Cruisers International in Coventry was set up in 1985, creating 24 ft – 30 ft fiberglass cruising boats for the European market. The best sellers were the Cruisers Intl 224 Holiday and Vee Express 267. The Vee Express 267 was a smaller 6–8-berth version of the USA constructed Vee Express 296. Cruisers International folded in 1992 as the result of a fault in the 267 mouldings that occurred when the UK company moved to a smaller location and left the mould outside in the elements.

== Cruisers Yachts today ==
In the early 1990s, the boatbuilding business suffered as the economy worsened. Venture Capitalist K.C. Stock, an experienced businessman in the Oconto area, saw potential in the struggling company and knew that if the biggest employer in the town were to close, it would be devastating to the town's economy. In 1993, his company KCS International purchased the company and renamed it Cruisers Yachts. Soon after, the industry saw an upswing in sales and an increasing demand. The company expanded its model lineup year after year. Today, the company builds express cruiser and flybridge style yachts, and has recently introduced new models that fit into the new sport coupe class of express boat. The company currently employs approximately 1,000 people, with an annual sales figure exceeding $94 million.
