= Gramercy Park Hotel =

Hotel in Manhattan, New York

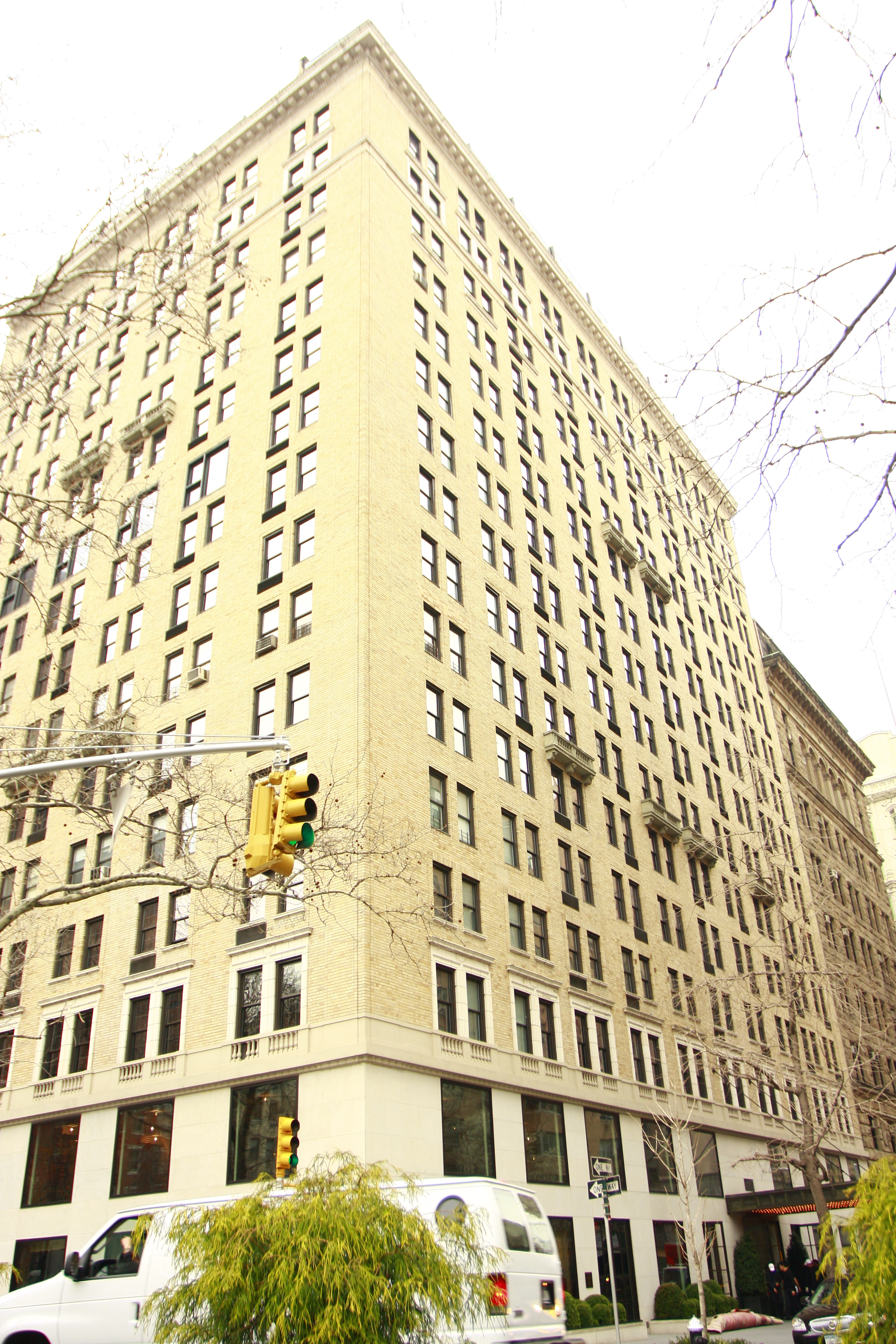

General information
- Location: 2 Lexington Avenue, Manhattan, New York City, United States
- Coordinates: 40.7385°N 73.9858°W
- Opening: 1925; 101 years ago
- Owner: MCR Hotels
- Operator: Manhattan Hospitality Advisors

Design and construction
- Architect: Robert T. Lyons
- Developer: Bing and Bing

Gramercy Park Hotel was a luxury hotel located at 2 Lexington Avenue, in the Gramercy Park neighborhood of Manhattan, New York City, adjacent to the park of the same name. It was known for its rich history. Originally opened in 1925, the hotel ceased operations in 2020 and was purchased by MCR Hotels in 2023 with plans to re-open in 2025.

== History ==
Gramercy Park Hotel was designed by Robert T. Lyons and built by the developer brothers Bing & Bing from 1924–1925, with an official opening in 1925. A westward extension along Gramercy Park North – a continuation of East 21st Street – was designed by the firm of Thompson & Churchill and built in 1929–1930. Both wings were designed in Renaissance Revival style. The hotel occupies the site of the former homes of the flamboyant architect Stanford White, political leader and defender of agnosticism Robert Ingersoll and lawyer-diarist George Templeton Strong.

Humphrey Bogart married his first wife Helen Menken at the hotel, and the Joseph P. Kennedy family, including a young John F. Kennedy, stayed on the second floor for several months, before the family moved to London so the elder Kennedy could take up his post as the American ambassador. During the Great Depression, Babe Ruth was a regular bar patron – an autographed picture of Ruth was hung in the bar until it disappeared in the 1960s – and when James Cagney and his wife lived nearby at 34 Gramercy Park, they were frequent diners at the hotel. In the 1940s, Edmund Wilson lived in the hotel with novelist Mary McCarthy, and humorist S.J. Perelman maintained his residence there, dying in his room in 1979.

In 1958 Herbert Weissberg, a prominent New York hotel owner, bought the hotel. In 1964, Weissberg (with the help of his long time advisor, the prominent Attorney Herbert Mendelson of Herrick Feinstein), sold the hotel to Wellington Associates for $3 million, but the Weissberg Corporation continued to operate the hotel under a long-term lease. Weissberg added a gift shop, doubled the size of the bar and gave tenure to Pinky, the beloved hotel bellhop.

Guests were drawn to its bohemian character, low prices and locale. The hotel's reputation for discretion attracted such musicians as Bob Marley and Bob Dylan in the 1970s.

The Canadian and Chicago part of the first cast of Saturday Night Live stayed in the hotel during the show's premiere and Paul Shaffer, the show's original bandleader, continued to live in the annex for another 16 years. Other former residents include character actress Margaret Hamilton, actor Matt Dillon, and playwright David Mamet. Other notable guests include the Clash, Madonna, Debbie Harry, and David Bowie.

By the late 1990s the hotel's ratings began to decline, as Weissberg's health began to fail. His sons fought for control and, after a series of family tragedies, the hotel was subleased in 2002 to Steven Greenberg, the founder of the Roxy nightclub. A bar was added to the roof but the restaurant closed. It began to attract a younger clientele and the prices began to increase rapidly. Following Weissberg's death in 2003 Gramercy Park Hotel was sold to Ian Schrager and Aby Rosen, who renovated the hotel in collaboration with artist Julian Schnabel. Schnabel designed the interiors, many fixtures and furniture pieces throughout the hotel. In 2010, Schrager sold his interest in the hotel to Rosen. The Rose Bar anchored the hotel, along with the Jade Bar and rooftop Gramercy Terrace restaurant. It was also home to Danny Meyer's Maialino, which served Italian cuisine. On April 23, 2014, conservationist Mark Shand, the brother of Queen Camilla, slipped and fell outside the Rose Bar, suffering a serious head injury and later that night died at the nearby Bellevue Hospital.

The hotel exhibited paintings by noted artists, including Jean-Michel Basquiat, Damien Hirst, Richard Prince, Julian Schnabel, Cy Twombly and Andy Warhol.

The hotel ceased operations in March 2020 as a result of the COVID-19 pandemic. It was announced in December 2020 that Rosen's hotel business faced eviction from the structure, because RFR was $900,000 behind on ground lease payments to Solil Management (the estate of developer Sol Goldman), which owns the land underneath. Rosen had been leasing the property for $5.3 million per year. In April 2021, Solil moved to terminate Rosen's lease and collect $79.5 million in back payments, but a state judge ruled that October that Rosen did not have to pay back that amount. Rosen's lease was finally terminated in June 2022, and all of the hotel's furnishings were auctioned off shortly thereafter.

MCR Hotels acquired the lease to the hotel in 2023, with plans to reopen the hotel in 2025. After a dispute arose within the Goldman family in 2024, Rosen attempted to take back control of the hotel, claiming that a stay of execution should be placed, reversing the termination of his lease.

== In popular culture ==
Gramercy Park Hotel is mentioned in pop culture history books, and has been a filming location for numerous films. It was used by Martin Scorsese for rehearsals and pre-production for the 1973 film Mean Streets. He also used Room 1501 to film a scene for Raging Bull. It was also used by Cameron Crowe, who filmed scenes in its lobby for the film Almost Famous.

Renowned Argentine rock musicians and singer-songwriters Charly García and Pedro Aznar, two of the most important artists in their country's history, jointly created the song Gramercy Park Hotel, as a track in their 1986 maxi single album Tango.

The song Oh God by Stephen Duffy and The Lilac Time, found on their August 2003 album Keep Going, mentions the Gramercy Park Hotel. The song was written by Stephen Duffy as a personal response to the September 11 attacks on the World Trade Center complex in 2001, during which he was a guest at the hotel.

Hotel Gramercy Park, a documentary directed by Douglas Keeve, premiered at the Tribeca Film Festival in April 2008. It chronicles the hotel's history during the Weissberg era, the turmoil that plagued his family, and Schrager's renovation.
