= Island Global Yachting =

American real estate company

Island Global Yachting (IGY) is a real estate company which primarily invests in and manages marinas.

== History ==
Island Global Yachting (IGY) was set up by Island Capital Group, the primary investment vehicle of Andrew Farkas (businessman). IGY focused on the higher end of the market servicing superyachts and megayachts.

IGY's first project was Yacht Haven Grande on Saint Thomas, U.S. Virgin Islands which began in 2001 and opened in 2007.

In 2021 Island Global Yachting was sold to MarineMax for $480 million. In 2024 Andrew Farkas offered to buy back IGY from MarineMax.

== Portfolio ==
- Wynn Al Marjan Island Marina, UAE (operator)
- IGY Vieux Port de Cannes, France
- IGY Ibiza Marina, Spain
- Port Cervo Marina, Italy (operator)
- IGY Savannah Harbor Marina, USA
- IGY Yacht Haven Grande St. Thomas, USVI
- Sindalah Yacht Club, Saudi Arabia (operator)
