= Dolly Lenz =

American businessman

Dolly Lenz (born February 15, 1957) is a real estate agent in New York City. According to Forbes Magazine, by 2008 she had sold $7 billion in real estate, including $748 million in 2006.

== Early life ==
Lenz, whose birth name is Idaliz Camino, was born in the Bronx to a Spanish immigrant father. She bought her first apartment at age 18 on Park Avenue in the Murray Hill neighborhood. Lenz graduated from Baruch College with a degree in accounting. She was an accountant at United Artists where she struck up a friendship with Barbra Streisand. Lenz attributes her early success in her career to her friendship with Streisand. Streisand was a client of Lenz, and the pair were often seen together socially, hoping to photograph Streisand, the press followed Lenz around wherever she went, the attention helped Lenz's career take off. "Without her, I'm not sure where I would have been, she made me". She began selling real estate in various agencies including Sotheby's before moving to Prudential's Douglas Elliman agency in 1999. She became vice chairman of the division in 2003.

== Career ==
While working as a CPA, Lenz made three real estate purchases. Recognizing all the hard work Lenz had put in to close each deal, her husband, a CPA, encouraged Lenz to become a real estate agent. After taking her real estate classes Lenz approached 29 firms for job offers. Eventually landing a meeting with Barbara Corcoran in the early 80's, Corcoran told Lenz to keep her job as a CPA, stating that nobody would hire her in real estate because of the way she looked. The feedback from Corcoran would strengthen her resolve to change career, and eventually Lenz was hired after her 30th interview. Lenz focused on studio apartments, as no other broker wanted to touch studios, and within her first six months working as a real estate agent, made in excess of $300,000, in 1984.

After establishing herself as a leading agent, Lenz was approached by the head of Sotheby's and offered a position with the firm. In her 11th year working with Sotheby's, Lenz was recruited by Andrew Farkas, who at the time was owner of Douglas Elliman, Farkas needing Lenz's help to sell the company. Combining her experience as a CPA and top agent, Lenz was instrumental in finding Prudential to purchase Douglas Elliman.

Lenz left Douglas Elliman to start her eponymous firm in June 2013.

She has been used frequently by Donald Trump.

In 2005 she sold the Burnt Point mansion in Wainscott, New York to billionaire Stewart Rahr for $45 million.

== Personal life ==
Dolly Lenz is married to CPA, Aaron Lenz, and they have a daughter named Jenny Lenz and a son named Joseph Lenz. Jenny Lenz joined her mother at Dolly Lenz Real Estate, and is currently the Managing Partner at the firm.
