= MarineMax =

American boat retail chain

MarineMax is a publicly listed boating and yachting industry company with investments in retail, yacht services, and marinas.

== History ==
MarineMax was founded by Bill McGill Jr. in 1998 in cooperation with a number of boat dealers.

In 2021 Island Global Yachting (IGY) was purchased by MarineMax from Andrew Farkas for $480 million.

In 2024 MarineMax suffered a data breach which included customer data. They settled a class action lawsuit related to the data breach in 2025.

In 2024 MarineMax moved their headquarters from Clearwater, Florida to a newly build complex in Oldsmar, Florida. In 2024 Farkas offered to buy back IGY. MarineMax minority shareholder The Donerail Group also placed pressure on the company over what they considered a misallocation of assets.

In 2025 MarineMax opened a new flagship location in Fort Myers, Florida.

The company posted a small net loss on 2.3 billion in revenue in 2025.

== See also ==
- Cruisers Yachts
