= Pasadena Hotel & Pool =

Historic hotel in Pasadena, California, U.S.

Coordinates: 34°08′44″N 118°07′52″W

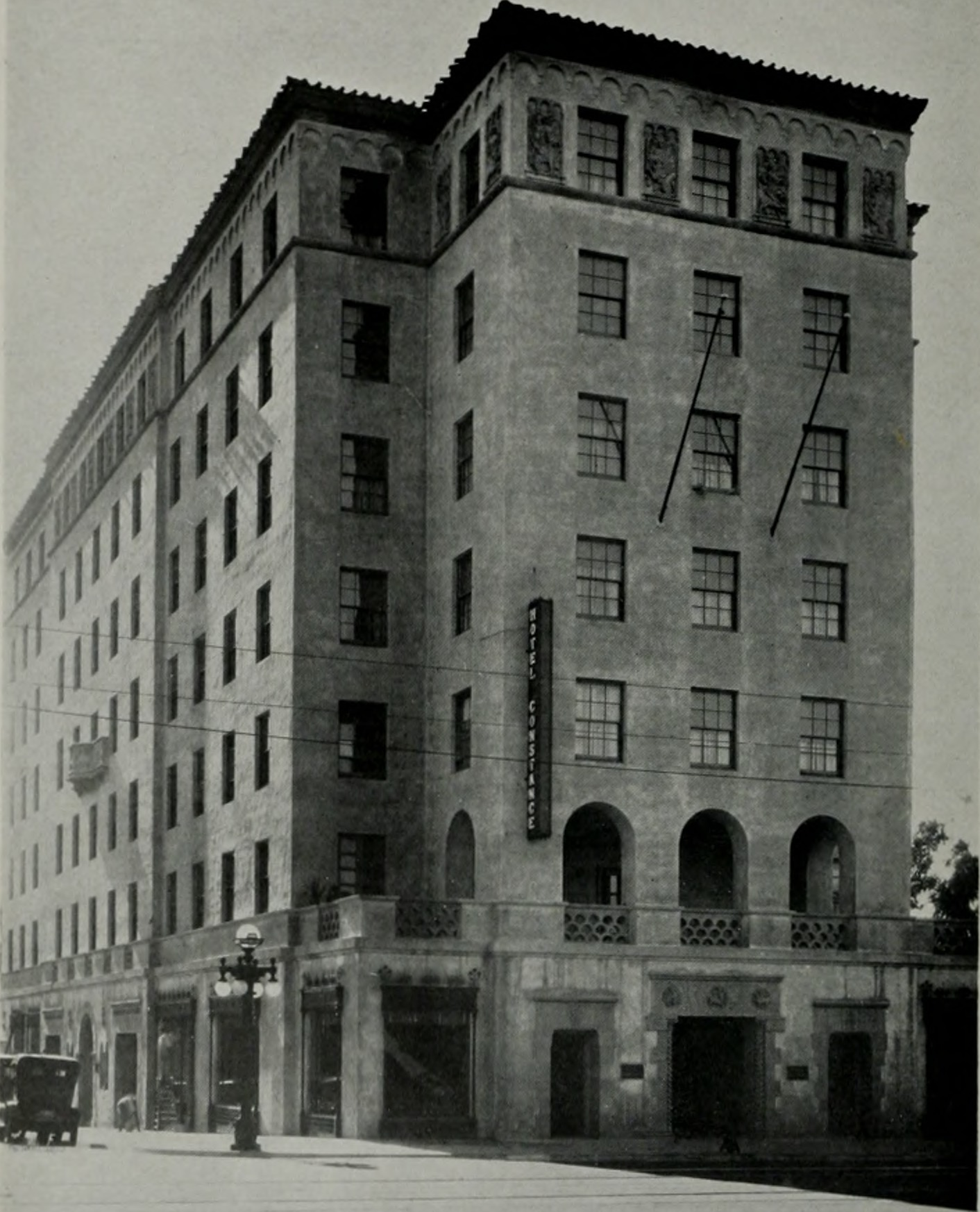
- Hotel Constance, c. 1927
- Former names: Hotel Constance

General information
- Location: 928 Colorado Boulevard, Pasadena, California, United States
- Year built: 1936
- Owner: MCR Hotels

Website
- www.pasadenahotel.com

The Pasadena Hotel & Pool is a historic hotel located on Colorado Boulevard in Pasadena, California. It was built in 1926 as the Hotel Constance and closed in 2020. It was purchased by MCR Hotels in 2021 and re-opened as the Pasadena Hotel & Pool.

== History ==
The Hotel Constance was founded by Pasadena businesswoman Constance V. L. Perry. It was constructed on property leased for 20 years by the Orndorff Hotel Company and opened on December 3, 1926. It was one of 18 major hotels in Pasadena at the time. Perry sold the Hotel Constance to hotelier J. Monroe Procter in 1930. The hotel eventually closed and was renamed the Pasadena Manor Retirement Hotel, serving for many decades as an assisted living facility, before closing in 2007.

The hotel was restored in 2014 by Hong Kong real estate investment company Singpoli, at a cost of $60 million. It reopened on September 9, 2014 as the dusitD2 constance pasadena, operated by the dusitD2 boutique division of the Thai Dusit International chain. The redecorated interior was described as "'an amazing pop of techno Thai culture' in bold colors and fluid shapes." The hotel received a Pasadena preservation award in 2015. A massive addition was completed in 2019, with a rooftop pool and 30 luxury suites. At that point the hotel was renamed Hotel Constance.

The hotel closed in March 2020, due to the outbreak of the COVID-19 pandemic. It re-opened in 2021 during which time it was under Chapter 11 bankruptcy and the property location was under foreclosure. It was acquired out of bankruptcy in March 2022 by MCR and reopened on November 2, 2022 as the Pasadena Hotel & Pool after a $4 million renovation.

== Building structure ==
The seven-story, reinforced-concrete building is located at the southwest corner of Colorado Boulevard and Mentor Avenue. It was designed by Los Angeles architect McNeal Swasey and included Romanesque and modified Mediterranean design elements. The original exterior included a frieze along the top of the building featuring stone panels of angels and griffins. The building was also decorated with wrought iron and cast stone, including images of centaurs and other mythical beasts.

The hotel has a rooftop pool and 161 rooms, including a Presidential suite and indoor and outdoor event spaces.
