= Lexington Hotel (New York City) =

Hotel in Manhattan, New York

The Lexington Hotel, Autograph Collection
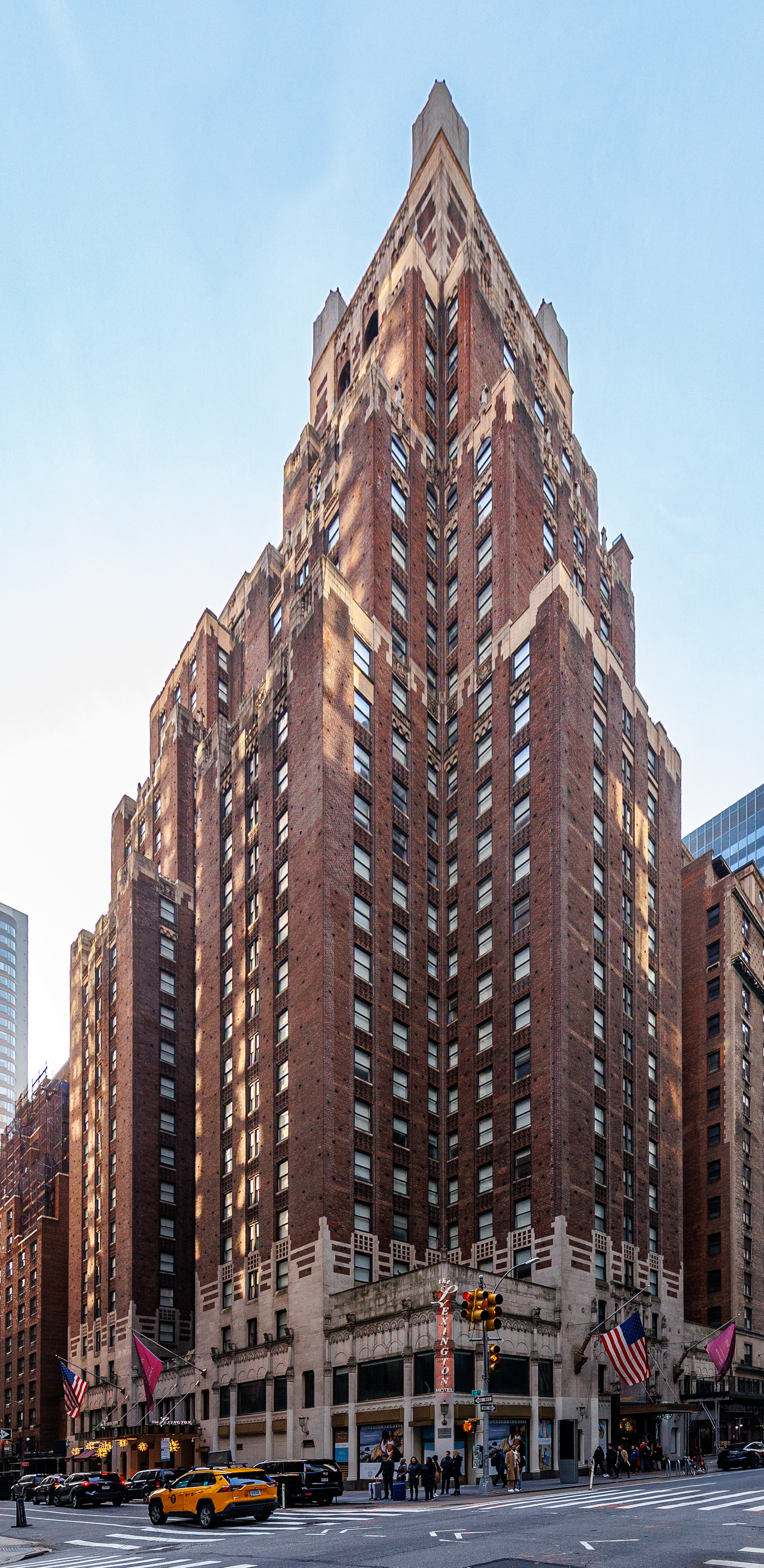

General information
- Location: 511 Lexington Avenue (corner with 48th Street), New York, NY, 10017
- Coordinates: 40°45′18″N 73°58′23″W
- Opening: 1929
- Owner: MCR Hotels; Three Wall Capital; Island Capital Group

Height
- Height: 316 ft (96 m)

Technical details
- Floor count: 27

Design and construction
- Architect: Schultze and Weaver

Other information
- Number of rooms: 725
- Number of suites: 25
- Number of restaurants: 2

Website
- Official website

New York City Landmark
- Designated: November 22, 2016
- Reference no.: 2559

The Lexington Hotel, Autograph Collection is a hotel at 509 Lexington Avenue, at the southeast corner with 48th Street, in the Midtown Manhattan neighborhood of New York City. The 27-story hotel was designed by Schultze & Weaver in the Romanesque Revival style and contains 725 rooms. The Lexington, one of several large hotels developed around Grand Central Terminal as part of Terminal City, is a New York City designated landmark.

The hotel building contains a facade of brick, limestone, and architectural terracotta. It contains light courts facing north and west, as well as setbacks to comply with the 1916 Zoning Resolution. The limestone base is two to three stories high and contains storefronts, a main entrance on 48th Street, and an archway on Lexington Avenue. The upper stories are generally clad with plain brick and contain random projecting groups of bricks; there is a narrow tower at the top of the building. The basement contains a restaurant space that formerly housed event venues, including the Hawaiian Room. When the hotel opened, it had 814 guestrooms, though this has been reduced over the years.

The Lexington opened on October 15, 1929, and was originally operated by the Hotel Lexington Corporation, led by J. Leslie Kincaid. The hotel went into foreclosure in 1932, and Ralph Hitz's National Hotel Management Company operated the hotel until 1937, when Hotel Lexington Inc. took over. Lawrence Wien bought the hotel in 1954 and leased it to a syndicate led by Saul Hertzig. Indian conglomerate Tata Group acquired the Lexington in 1981 and operated it for several years. The hotel became the Radisson Hotel New York-East Side in 1999 after becoming a franchise of Radisson Hotels. DiamondRock Hospitality acquired the hotel in 2011, and the Lexington left the Radisson chain and became part of Marriott's Autograph Collection. Since 2021, a joint venture between MCR Hotels, Three Wall Capital, and Island Capital Group has owned the Lexington.

== Site ==
The Lexington Hotel is at 511 Lexington Avenue, at the southeast corner with 48th Street, in the Midtown Manhattan neighborhood of New York City. It sits on the western portion of a city block bounded by Lexington Avenue to the west, 48th Street to the north, Third Avenue to the east, and 47th Street to the south. The hotel occupies a rectangular land lot with an area of 17,522 ft^{2} (1,627.8 m^{2}). The site has a frontage of 100 ft (30 m) on Lexington Avenue and 175 ft (53 m) on 48th Street.

The building is across from 245 Park Avenue to the southwest, 277 Park Avenue to the west, the InterContinental New York Barclay Hotel and 299 Park Avenue to the northwest, and the New York Marriott East Side to the north. The Lexington was part of "Hotel Row", a collection of hotels developed along Lexington Avenue in the early 20th century. Prior to the development of the Hotel Lexington, the site had been occupied by a brick "elevator building". The surrounding section of Lexington Avenue from 42nd to 52nd Street did not experience significant development until the late 19th century, when row houses and tenements, made of brick and brownstone, were developed in the area.

== Architecture ==
The original architect was Schultze & Weaver. The hotel was designed in the Romanesque Revival style, with a facade of brick, limestone, and architectural terracotta. The hotel building contains setbacks to comply with the 1916 Zoning Resolution. It is variously cited as being 25, 27, or 30 stories high. This discrepancy is based on whether the towers atop the building, which have pyramidal roofs, are counted.

=== Facade ===
The building's base is clad with limestone and ranges from two to three stories high. The rest of the facade is clad with red brick; at arbitrary intervals, there are projecting bricks which are laid on their header faces. In addition, there are light courts on the north and west elevations above the 2nd floor, and there are windows with brick spandrels above the 5th floor.

==== Base ====
The center of the Lexington Avenue facade contains a round arch, which was originally an entrance but has since been converted to a storefront. The arch is flanked by black-marble piers, and there is an overhanging marquee and a semicircular glass window directly above the entrance. On the second floor, the archway is flanked by windows with engaged columns on either side, which in turn are topped by tympana. In addition, the facade contains sculptural details such as griffins, rosettes, and six sculpted figures (two sitting, four standing) that signify the seasons. The third floor contains two arcaded windows, both of which are flanked by columns that contain winged lions at their bases and human faces at their capitals. On either side of the black-marble piers are large windows, which originally contained doorways. Next to these windows are angled piers, which contain depictions of eagles with shields at their capitals. A pair of flagpoles projects from these piers; the bases of the flagpoles are shaped like eagles.

To the north and south of the Lexington Avenue archway are two-story wings, which are divided into multiple bays by angled piers. Each of those wings contains a storefront at ground level. The tops of these piers contain Corinthian capitals, above which are engaged columns with winged lions atop them. Above the second-story windows of both wings are tympana, followed by a frieze with alternating rosettes and griffins. The 48th Street facade is similar in design to that on Lexington Avenue, except that some of the windows have been infilled and replaced with ventilation grates. The easternmost bay of the 48th Street entrance is recessed from the rest of the facade and contains a round arch with a service entrance. Directly above the service entrance, the second floor contains a pair of round-arched windows within a stone frame.

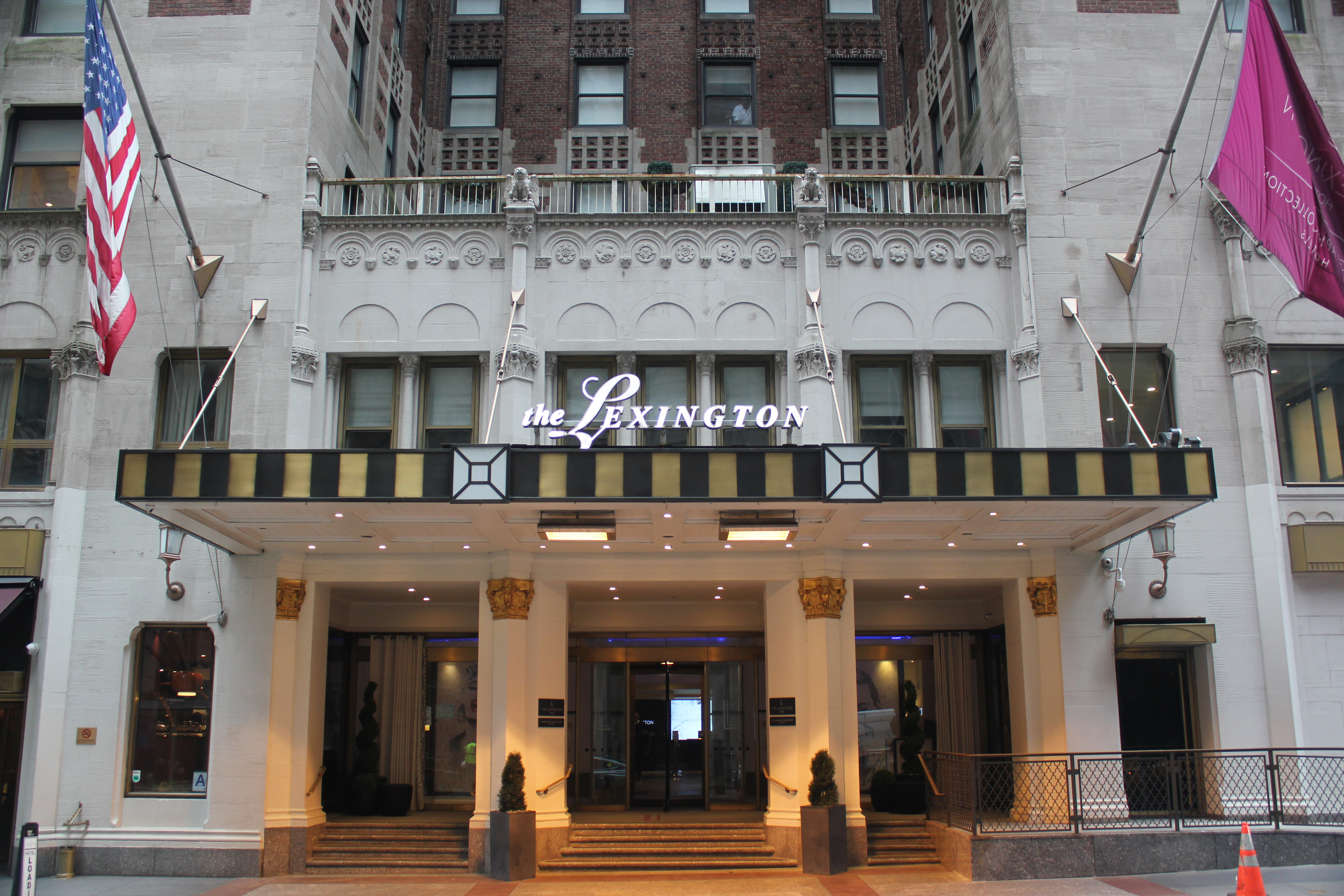
Main entrance

The center of the 48th Street elevation contains the main entrance, which is three bays wide and is shielded by a projecting marquee with the hotel's name. Each bay is separated by a geometric pier, ornamented with a gilded capital at the first story and a stone lion above the second story. A small set of steps leads up to a recessed foyer, and there is also a wheelchair ramp. Above the entrance, there is a railing at the third story, behind which is a light court.

==== Upper stories ====
The upper stories are generally clad with plain brick and contain random projecting groups of bricks. The spandrels, between the windows on each story, contain geometric motifs. The windows, parapets, and the side walls adjacent to the parapets are decorated in terracotta. Some of the bricks, windows, and terracotta detailing have been replaced over the years. In the easternmost bay on 48th Street, the third-floor windows have stone frames, while the fourth-floor windows have stone sills.

The 21st-story windows consist of round arches, although the transom windows on this story (at the top of each arch) have been infilled. There are bird-shaped finials above the 21st-story spandrels and lintels. A narrow tower, with round arches and a pyramidal roof, rises above the Lexington Avenue facade on the 21st story. In addition, the southern wing on Lexington Avenue has a mansard roof and a chimney. There are an additional chimney and tower on 48th Street.

=== Features ===
==== Public rooms ====
Unlike in older hotels, the Lexington's ground level originally had retail space instead of meeting areas. The basement of the hotel initially contained a dining room known as the Silver Grill, which opened in 1932 and was converted into the Hawaiian Room in 1937. Jac Lessman redesigned the Hawaiian Room with a wall mural painted by Carl Koeck, a blue ceiling, and palm-tree decorations. According to The Wall Street Journal, the restaurant was described as having the "best Polynesian cuisine east of the Pacific". By 2012, the hotel had three restaurants: a Latin-American cafe named Taina Café, a gourmet Chinese restaurant named S. Dynasty, and a casual eatery called Raffles. The lobby contained a reception desk with an illuminated clock behind it.

The modern design of the Lexington's public rooms dates to a 2016 renovation by architectural firm dash design, which converted the S. Dynasty space into a 5,000 ft^{2} (460 m^{2}) meeting space. The ground level contains a pair of Art Deco-style meeting rooms known as the Speakeasy and the Interlude, which can collectively fit 120 people. The rooms are designed with neutral colors and purple hues, as well as artwork by Mao Kudo and Rose Dickson. The spaces are accessed from a pre-function space called the Swing Room, which adjoins a small niche for meetings. The hotel also contains a two-story lobby with furnishings and art from the early 20th century, as well as a bar called the Mixing Room.

==== Guestrooms ====
The hotel originally had 801 guestrooms. Following a renovation in 2001, the hotel had 522 regular rooms, 101 deluxe rooms, and 82 suites. By 2012, the hotel had 712 rooms. At that time, the guestrooms were redecorated in a Jazz Age-inspired style with Art Deco patterns and furniture. One of the 18th-floor suites, formerly occupied by baseball player Joe DiMaggio and his actress wife Marilyn Monroe, is themed to baseball and contains a living room, a kitchen, a bedroom, two bathrooms, and a terrace. As of 2021, MCR Hotels operates the Lexington as a 725-room hotel.

== History ==
In the 19th century, New York Central Railroad lines north of Grand Central Depot in Midtown Manhattan were served exclusively by steam locomotives, and the rising traffic soon caused accumulations of smoke and soot in the Park Avenue Tunnel, the only approach to the depot. After a fatal crash in 1902, the New York state legislature passed a law to ban all steam trains in Manhattan by 1908. The New York Central's vice president William J. Wilgus proposed electrifying the line and building a new electric-train terminal underground, a plan that was implemented almost in its entirety. The old Grand Central Depot was torn down in phases and replaced by the current Grand Central Terminal. Construction on Grand Central Terminal started in 1903, and the new terminal was opened on February 2, 1913. Passenger traffic on the commuter lines into Grand Central more than doubled in the years following the terminal's completion.

The terminal spurred development in the surrounding area, particularly in Terminal City, a commercial and office district created above where the tracks were covered. Terminal City soon became Manhattan's most desirable commercial and office district. A 1920 New York Times article said, "With its hotels, office buildings, apartments and underground Streets it not only is a wonderful railroad terminal, but also a great civic centre." The Lexington was one of several hotels developed in Terminal City, along with other hostelries such as the Barclay, Commodore, Roosevelt, and Biltmore.

=== Development and early years ===
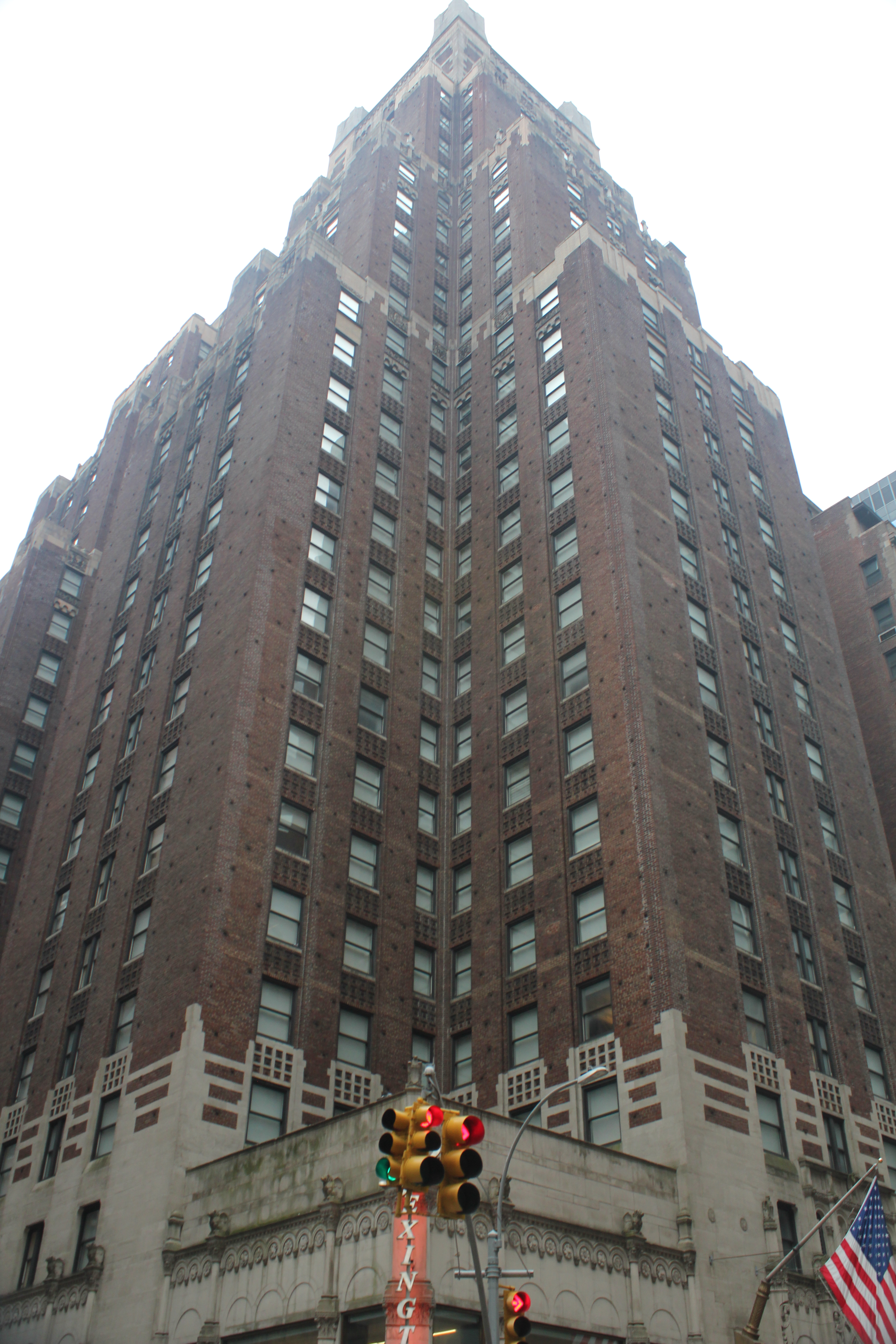
View of the upper stories from across Lexington Avenue and 48th Street

Tishman Realty & Construction had purchased the site at the southeast corner of Lexington Avenue and 48th Street, then quickly resold it to the Lexington Hotel Corporation, in the late 1920s. General J. Leslie Kincaid, the president of the American Hotel Corporation (parent company of the Lexington Hotel Corporation), announced in May 1928 that he would begin demolishing existing structures on the site and construct a hotel at a cost of $6.5 million. (Note: This is equivalent to $122 million in 2025. (Note: 1634–1699: McCusker, J. J. (1997). How Much Is That in Real Money? A Historical Price Index for Use as a Deflator of Money Values in the Economy of the United States: Addenda et Corrigenda (PDF). American Antiquarian Society. 1700–1799: McCusker, J. J. (1992). How Much Is That in Real Money? A Historical Price Index for Use as a Deflator of Money Values in the Economy of the United States (PDF). American Antiquarian Society. 1800–present: Federal Reserve Bank of Minneapolis. "Consumer Price Index (estimate) 1800–".)) S. W. Straus & Co. placed a $4.5 million mortgage (Note: This is equivalent to $84 million in 2025.) loan on the hotel that month. At the time, many hotels, commercial structures, and office buildings were being developed on Lexington Avenue north of 42nd Street. Schultze and Weaver were hired as the architects, while Turner Construction was the general contractor. Several workers received craftsmanship awards at a ceremony in August 1929. The Hotel Lexington opened on October 15, 1929, one of several hotels to be built in Midtown Manhattan during the 1920s. From the outset, customers were banned from tipping the waitstaff at the hotel's bar and restaurant; instead, a 10 percent gratuity was applied to all guests. The Lexington was one of 33 hotels in the American Hotel Corporation chain.

The restaurant space in the basement was initially unoccupied until 1932, when the Silver Grill opened there. Because the Lexington had opened at the beginning of the Great Depression, its business suffered, and the hotel defaulted on both its $3.9 million first mortgage and $600,000 second mortgage. (Note: The first mortgage is worth $73 million, and the second mortgage is about $11 million, in 2025.) The National Hotel Management Company, operated by the New Yorker Hotel's manager Ralph Hitz, acquired the Lexington Hotel in March 1932. Reliance Property Management, headed by Frank W. Kriedel, was placed in charge of the Lexington's day-to-day operations. Shortly thereafter, as part of a foreclosure proceeding against the Lexington Hotel Corporation, a federal judge appointed Robert P. Patterson of Irving Trust as the hotel's receiver, and two groups were created to represent the hotel's bondholders. In August 1934, a group of bondholders asked the United States Bankruptcy Court for the Southern District of New York to reorganize the Lexington Hotel Corporation; the corporation was reorganized the next year.

The hotel's Silver Grill was one of the most popular entertainment venues in a New York City hotel by the mid-1930s, offering live music during lunch and dinner. The Silver Grill was renovated into the Hawaiian Room in mid-1937. The National Hotel Management Company stopped operating the Lexington in July 1937 because it wanted to focus on managing the nearby Hotel Montclair. John M. Stoddard, who had been elected as Hotel Lexington Inc.'s president, appointed Charles E. Rochester as the new manager. Within a month, hotel officials began planning an outdoor cafe, and they opened the Paul Revere Tavern at the hotel in October 1937. The Hawaiian Room was extremely popular upon its opening, and it remained so in the early 1940s. Although Rochester became the president of Hotel Lexington Inc. in 1946, he continued to manage the Lexington.

=== 1950s to 1970s ===
Louis Schleiffer acquired the hotel at the end of December 1954. As part of the agreement, Rochester was to continue operating the hotel, and general manager George W. Miller remained in his position. At the time, the hotel contained 801 rooms and was assessed at $3.75 million. (Note: Equivalent to $45 million in 2025.) The shareholders of Hotel Lexington Inc. approved the sale in early February 1955; Schleiffer would buy 83 percent of the corporation's 91,110 outstanding shares of common stock for $5.25 million. (Note: Equivalent to $63 million in 2025.) Before Schleiffer could finalize his purchase, real-estate investor Lawrence Wien agreed to buy Schleiffer's contract for the hotel. Wien planned to take title to the hotel on May 2, 1955, he planned to lease it to a syndicate led by Saul Hertzig. In turn, Hertzig planned to spend $250,000 renovating the guestrooms. After Wien took title that May, Massachusetts Mutual Life Insurance placed a $3.25 million first mortgage on the hotel. (Note: Equivalent to $39 million in 2025.) Rochester resigned from his position as the hotel's manager that July.

Hotel Lexington Associates, which owned the hotel, announced in 1963 that it would replace the hotel's manually operated elevators with automatic cabs. To fund this renovation, the owner received a $140,000 mortgage loan on the property. (Note: Equivalent to $1 million in 2025.) After the Hawaiian Room's business declined sharply during the 1966 New York City transit strike, the room was closed temporarily, and the room was permanently shuttered after a fire the same year. The Chateau Madrid club moved into the Hawaiian Room's space in late 1968; the space could accommodate either 600 or 700 guests. Charles Hertzig served as the hotel's director until he died in 1968. By the 1970s, community college students were trying to encourage business at the Lexington Hotel. The Chateau Madrid was sold in 1974 but continued to operate at the hotel into the late 1970s.

=== 1980s to 2000s ===
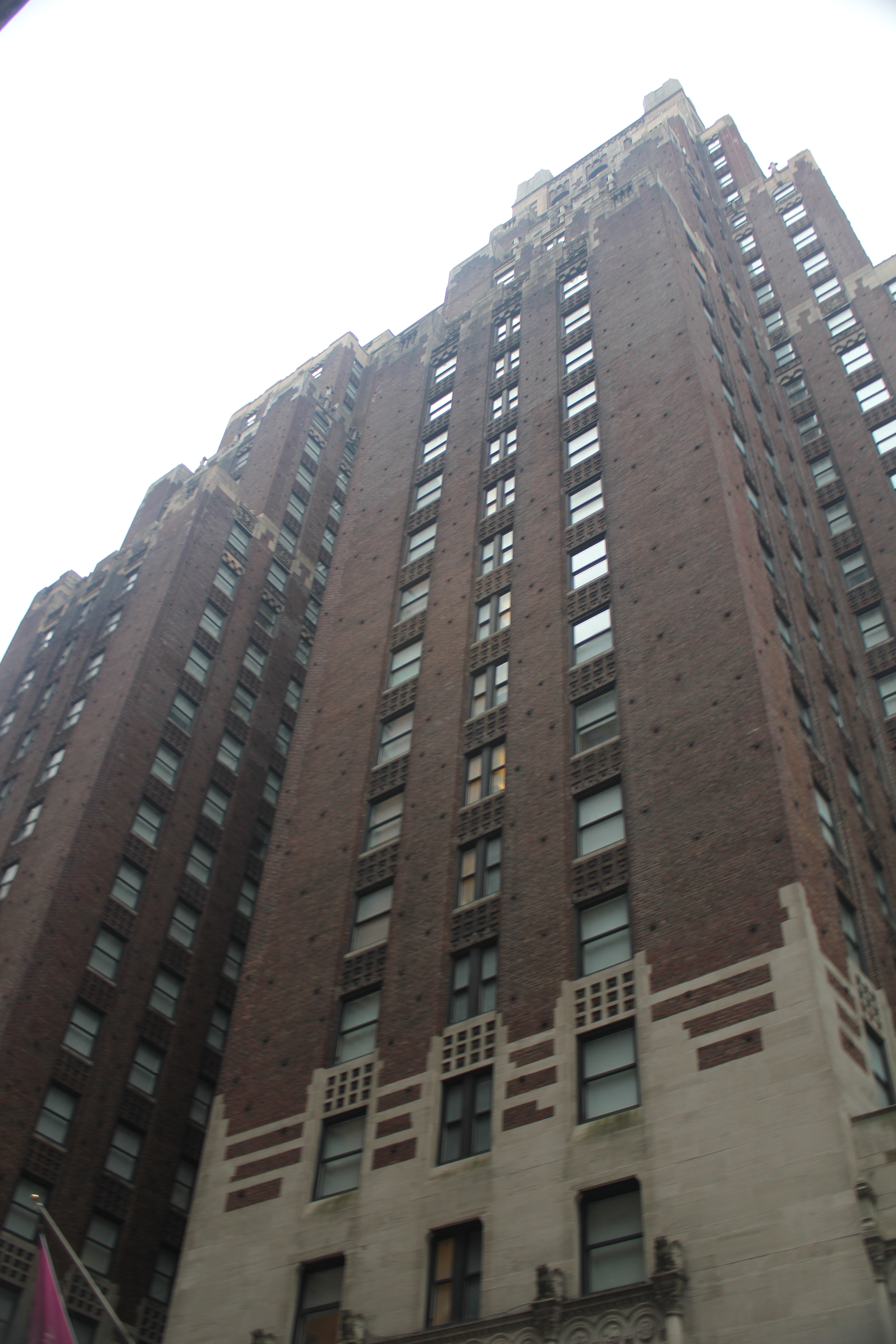
48th Street facade, with light court

Indian conglomerate Tata Group acquired the Lexington in September 1981, and the Taj Hotels chain began managing the hostelry. During this time, the Lexington operated as a mid-priced hotel. The base of the hotel, which had been altered several times throughout its history, was rebuilt in the 1980s; the rebuilt base resembled the original design. The New York Playboy Club relocated to the Chateau Madrid's former space in 1983, but the club was only housed at the hotel for a short time. The hotel rebranded eight of its floors as the Lexington Towers in 1990, including the 23rd floor, which contained non-smoking rooms. The Lexington Towers also contained a private lounge with a bar, as well as mini-fridges and turndown service in each room.

In December 1999, Radisson Hotels announced that the hotel would operate as a Radisson franchise and would be renamed the Radisson Hotel New York-East Side. Highgate Oxford Hospitality took over the hotel's operation. Lexington Hotel LLC (a joint venture between the Blackstone Group, Goldman Sachs, Whitehall Street Real Estate, and Oxford Capital Partners) owned the hotel, while Highgate Hotels operated the hostelry. The retail space was rented to tenants such as Starbucks. Following the September 11 attacks in 2001, some of the hotel's space was offered to companies that had been displaced from the World Trade Center. The Lexington underwent a $518 million renovation, which was finished in 2001; several rooms were further renovated in 2004. MeriStar Hospitality bought a 49.99 percent stake in the hotel for $50 million in 2004. The hotel was renovated in 2006 for $20 million. LaSalle Bank placed a $100 million mortgage loan on the building in 2007.

=== 2010s to present ===
In May 2011, DiamondRock Hospitality agreed to pay $335 million for the Radisson Lexington, making a 10 percent down payment. At the time, the new owner planned to sign a short-term agreement with Radisson. DiamondRock obtained a $170.4 million syndicated loan from a consortium of banks in March 2012. The hotel left the Radisson chain in September 2012, becoming an independent hotel known as The Lexington New York City. The Lexington was added to Marriott's "Autograph Collection" brand in mid-2013. Highgate simultaneously announced that it would spend several million dollars renovating the hotel, and the Lexington was renovated at a cost of $46 million. The project, completed in 2016, involved restoring architectural elements.

The New York City Landmarks Preservation Commission (LPC) hosted public hearings in 2013 to determine whether the Lexington Hotel and four other structures in East Midtown should be designated as New York City landmarks. In mid-2016, the LPC proposed protecting twelve buildings in East Midtown, including the Lexington Hotel, in advance of proposed changes to the area's zoning. On November 22, 2016, the LPC designated the Lexington Hotel and ten other nearby buildings as city landmarks.

The hotel closed temporarily in early 2020 due to the COVID-19 pandemic in New York City. Hotel operator MCR Hotels, along with Three Wall Capital and Andrew Farkas's firm Island Capital Group, acquired the hotel in July 2021 for $185 million. The sale occurred amid a decline in tourism due to the COVID-19 pandemic. Farkas reopened the hotel shortly afterward; prior to his purchase, the hotel had been closed since early 2020 due to the pandemic. In May 2024, the hotel was refinanced with a $155 million loan from Hudson Bay Capital. By 2025, Farkas and his partners were looking to sell the hotel for about $275 million.

== Notable tenants ==
When the Lexington opened, some of the space on the southwest corner of the mezzanine was leased by the Sons of the American Revolution. The Hotel Lexington was home to many celebrities, including baseball player Joe DiMaggio, who resided at suite 1806; actress Marilyn Monroe, who lived with DiMaggio during their marriage; and actress Dorothy Lamour, who stayed at the hotel every time she visited the city. Later in the Lexington's history, its guests included U.S. President Bill Clinton, tennis player Roger Federer, and singer-actresses Patti LaBelle and Jennifer Lopez.

The hotel's Silver Grill hosted performances by Artie Shaw's band, which The New York Times described as "an ill-fated attempt to build a swing band around a jazz quartet". During the Hawaiian Room's existence, the room hosted numerous Hawaiian musicians such as Alfred Apaka, Kui Lee, Emma Veary, Mahi Beamer, and Hilo Hattie, as well as bands led by Andy Iona, Ray Kinney, and Lani McIntyre. In addition, entertainer Arthur Godfrey broadcast his radio show live from the Hawaiian Room.

== Critical reception ==
When the Lexington was completed, trade publications such as Architect, The American Architect, Architectural Forum, and Architecture and Building reported on the hotel. When Leonard B. Schultze of Schultze & Weaver applied for membership in the American Institute of Architects in 1929, he listed the then-recently completed Lexington as one of twelve buildings in the U.S. that he designed. In a book published in 1932, W. Parker Chase wrote of the Lexington: "They term it 'The Hotel with a Heart' as everybody connected with the place from Bell Boy to President seems to have been drilled in the art of courtesy and a desire to please." George Shepard Chappell, writing in The New Yorker under the pseudonym "T-Square", said the Lexington was "a romantic addition" to the avenue with which it shared a name. The hotel was also shown in the 2005 book Grand Hotels of the Jazz Age: The Architecture of Schultze & Weaver.

In 1996, a writer for the New York Daily News described the Lexington as being "ideal for business travelers who need the prestige of a name-brand midtown hotel", saying that it was "decorated in a subdued traditional style, with plenty of lobby room to meet friends or business associates". Christopher Gray wrote for The New York Times in 2009 that the hotel's Lexington Avenue entrance was a "Frappuccino gauntlet" because there was a Starbucks on both sides, but that the flagpoles were a "disrespectful, throwaway cast. Better not to fly the flag at all."

== See also ==
- Art Deco architecture of New York City
- List of New York City Designated Landmarks in Manhattan from 14th to 59th Streets
- List of hotels in New York City
