= Sander R. Gerber =

Sander Gerber is an American businessman and the founder of Hudson Bay Capital Management. Since 2025, he has served on the President's Intelligence Advisory Board, advising President Donald J. Trump on classified matters.

== Early life and education ==
Gerber graduated from the University of Pennsylvania.

== Career ==
In 1997, Gerber founded Gerber Asset Management. In late 2005, Mr. Gerber and Yoav Roth co-founded Hudson Bay Capital. He is a co-creator of the Gerber Statistic, a measurement of "how two securities move relative to each other."

Mr. Gerber served as a member of the Senior Advisory Group to the Director of National Intelligence from 2017 to 2019 and as a member of the United States Agency for International Development's Partnership for Peace Fund Advisory Board from 2022 to 2025.

Gerber was a major donor to Trump's campaign committees. In 2025, President Trump appointed Gerber to the President's Intelligence Advisory Board.

Gerber is a board member of the Republican Jewish Coalition. He has been vocal about his views on Israeli-Palestinian conflicts and U.S. aid funding in the Middle East. He has also written about government reliance on scientific expertise as a policymaking tool. He served on the AIPAC board of directors from 2004 to 2016.
