= The High Line Hotel =

Hotel in Manhattan, New York

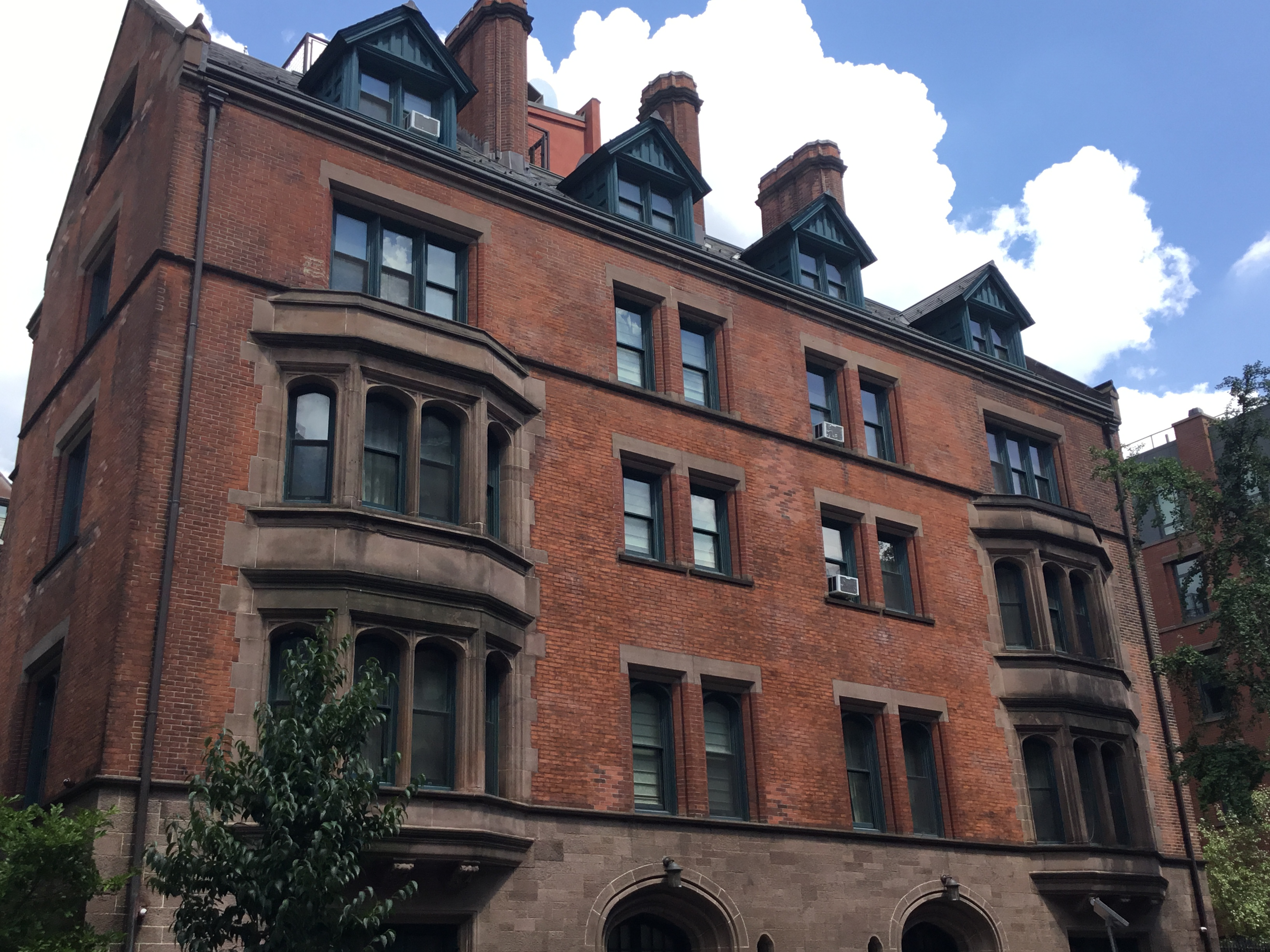
- The High Line Hotel, 2018
- Interactive map of the The High Line Hotel area

General information
- Architectural style: Collegiate Gothic
- Location: 180 Tenth Avenue; New York, New York
- Coordinates: 40°44′46.3″N 74°00′17.9″W
- Opening: May 2013
- Owner: Brodsky Organization; MCR Hotels

Website
- thehighlinehotel.com

The High Line Hotel is a historic hotel in the West Chelsea neighborhood of Manhattan in New York City. The building was constructed in 1895 as a dormitory for the General Theological Seminary and is now owned by the Brodsky Organization and MCR Hotels. The hotel was opened in May 2013.

== History ==
The land on which The High Line Hotel sits was once part of British Major Thomas Clarke's "Chelsea" estate, which was established in 1750 and is the namesake for the current surrounding neighborhood. The estate would eventually be passed down to Clarke's grandson, Clement Clarke Moore, who wrote his 1823 Christmas poem, "A Visit from St. Nicholas," on the property. Moore also operated an apple orchard on the estate, which is where The High Line Hotel is now located.

In the 1820s, Moore donated the land that contained the apple orchard to the Episcopal Church. It would become the home of the General Theological Seminary, which is still in operation at the location. The land, however, remained mostly undeveloped until 1878 when Eugene Augustus Hoffman was appointed dean. Hoffman hired architect Charles C. Haight to design a Neo Gothic-style campus based on the campus designs of Oxford and Cambridge University. The building that would become The High Line Hotel was completed as student housing in 1895 on 10th Avenue at West 20th Street. Hoffman Hall, the hotel's event and meeting space, was completed in 1899.

In 2005, the building began housing guests for the Seminary's Desmond Tutu Conference Center. Due to mounting financial issues, the Seminary began selling off select buildings in 2010. It sold the building that would become The High Line Hotel to the Brodsky Organization and MCR Hotels in September 2012. The hotel's interior and decor were designed and curated by Roman and Williams. The High Line Hotel opened in May 2013. Its name is a reference to its proximity to the High Line park. Since its opening, the hotel has hosted numerous events such as the Penny Dreadful premiere, People magazine's upfronts presentation, and the wedding of ballet dancers, Robert Fairchild and Tiler Peck.

== Design ==
The High Line Hotel contains 60 guest rooms, a conference and event space in Hoffman Hall, an Intelligentsia Coffee & Tea location, and a seasonal restaurant in its front garden. A repurposed 1963 Citroën H Van also serves Intelligentsia coffee in the garden. The hotel is built in a Collegiate Gothic style, furnished with Victorian and Edwardian era antiques, rewired rotary dial telephones from the 1920s, vintage typewriters, and Tiffany lamps. One potential explanation for the origin of the term "Big Apple" comes from when Moore grew apples on the property, though this is likely apocryphal.
