= MCR Hotels =

American hotel owner-operator

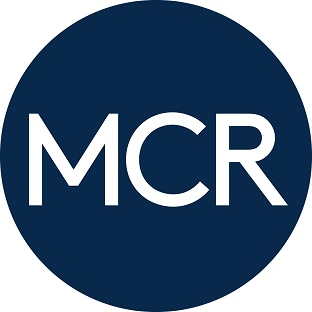
- Industry: Hospitality
- Founded: 2006; 20 years ago
- Founder: Tyler Morse
- Headquarters: United States
- Key people: Tyler Morse, Chairman & CEO; William White, CFO
- Website: www.mcrhotels.com

MCR Hotels is an American hotel owner-operator. It is the third largest hotel owner in the United States by room count, with 25,000 rooms and hotels that include The High Line and TWA hotels. Outside of hotels, MCR Hotels owns hotel management software Stayntouch and has agreed to purchase Soho House.

== History ==
MCR Hotels was founded by Tyler Morse in 2006. Its first hotel was built in Huntsville, Alabama the same year. In 2012, MCR Hotels purchased a historic dormitory of General Theological Seminary that was built in 1895. The building was converted into The High Line Hotel which was opened in May 2013.

In 2015, MCR and JetBlue negotiated the rights to turn the head house of the TWA Flight Center into a new hotel. The TWA Hotel opened on May 15, 2019 and is the only hotel operating within the boundaries of JFK Airport. By 2019, the company owned 90 hotels in 29 states.

MCR purchased the Sheraton New York Times Square Hotel in 2020 along with Island Capital Group. The same year, it also purchased the cloud-based property management system StayNTouch and the Royalton Hotel with plans to renovate the property.

In 2021, MCR Hotels purchased the Lexington Hotel in New York City. It also purchased the Housekeeping software firm Optii the same year.

MCR acquired the former Hotel Constance out of bankruptcy in 2022. The same year, it re-opened the hotel under the name Pasadena Hotel & Pool after $4 million in renovations. MCR acquired a 99-year lease on the Gramercy Park Hotel in 2023, with plans to reopen the hotel in 2025.

On February 21, 2024, BT Group announced the sale of London's BT Tower to MCR Hotels for £275 million, with plans to repurpose the landmark communications tower as an iconic hotel. It now owns Hyatt Regency at O'Hare International Airport. In August 2025, MCR agreed to take Soho House private in a $2.7 billion deal, including debt.

== Operations ==
MCR Hotels is a hotel owner and operator and considered the third largest hotel owner in the United States by room count. In addition to hotel operations, it owns the hotel management software Stayntouch which it purchased in 2020.
