= Andrew Farkas (businessman) =

American real estate developer

- Born: June 17, 1960 (age 66); United States
- Education: Harvard University
- Occupation: Businessman

Andrew Farkas is an American businessman primarily involved in real estate and banking.

== Early life and education ==
Farkas was raised in Jamaica, Queens, and attended Trinity School in Manhattan. His father, Robin L. Farkas, was chairman and chief executive officer of the department store chain Alexander's from 1984 to 1993. Farkas' mother died when he was eleven years old.

Farkas studied economics at Harvard College, graduating in 1982. During his time at Harvard, he served as president of the Hasty Pudding Club.

== Career ==
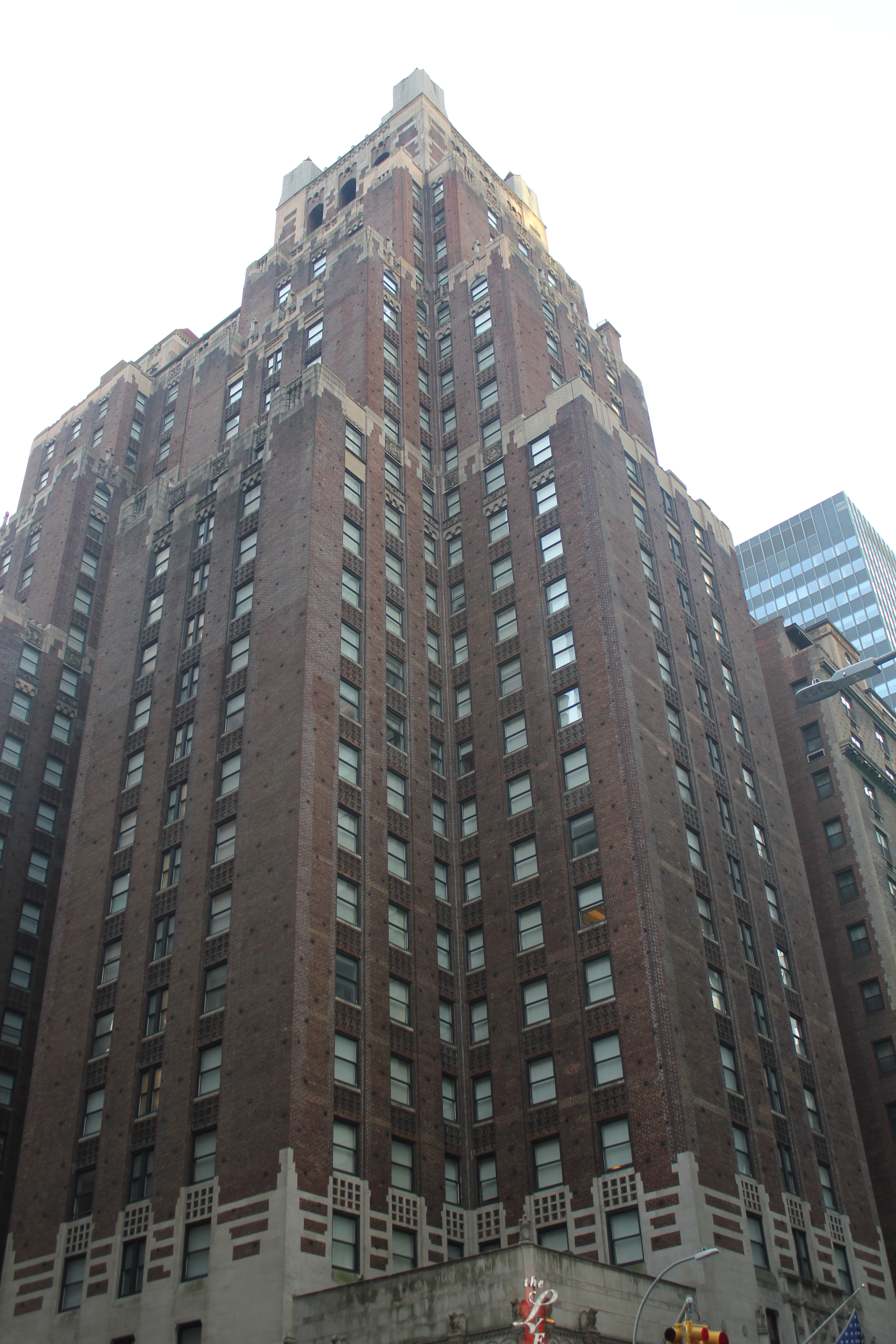
Lexington Hotel (New York City)

Farkas became a prominent figure in New York City commercial real estate in the 1990s. In 1990 he founded Insignia Financial Group, which he took public in 1993. In 1996, he acquired the brokerage firm Edward S. Gordon and Company. In 1998, he sold his portfolio of residential properties to Aimco.

Farkas' primary investment vehicle is Island Capital Group, a merchant bank. The company had a subsidiary, Island Global Yachting (IGY), which developed and managed marinas. IGY's first project was Yacht Haven Grande on Saint Thomas, U.S. Virgin Islands, which began in 2001 and opened in 2007.

In 2007, Island Capital acquired the Montauk Yacht Club Resort and Marina in Montauk, New York. The property was sold in 2017 to George Filopolous.

In 2010, Farkas acquired Centerline Holding Company, a major commercial real estate mortgage servicer. Following the Black Monday crash in 2011 and the broader financial downturn, Farkas was an aggressive buyer of distressed commercial assets. In 2014, he listed for sale a townhouse on the Upper East Side which he had acquired in 2007; it sold for US$41 million.

In 2017, Farkas attempted to enter into a partnership with Marty Burger, CEO of Infinite Global Real Estate Partners, but the deal collapsed. In 2019, following Jeffrey Epstein's second arrest, it was revealed that Epstein owned a 50% stake in the American Yacht Harbour at Red Hook; the other half was owned by Farkas. The partnership began in 2007, when Epstein was having financial, regulatory, and legal problems.

In 2021, Island Global Yachting was sold to MarineMax. The same year, a joint venture headed by Farkas purchased the Lexington Hotel in New York City. The property was refinanced in 2024 through a loan from the Hudson's Bay Company. Also in 2024, Island Capital and JW Capital Management acquired a large multifamily housing portfolio formerly owned by Blackstone Inc.. In 2025, Farkas sold a house in Palm Beach, Florida for US$51 million.

== Politics ==
Farkas was one of the primary fundraisers for New York politician Andrew Cuomo, who he briefly employed. During the 2025 New York City mayoral campaign, Zohran Mamdani used Farkas' links to Epstein to criticize Cuomo.

== Personal life ==
Farkas enjoys yachting. In 2016, he and his second wife divorced.

=== Association with Jeffrey Epstein ===
Farkas was a friend and business partner of financier and child sex offender Jeffrey Epstein. In 2026, Farkas downplayed his relationship with Epstein despite the release of more than 2,000 emails between them in the Epstein files.

== See also ==
- Dolly Lenz
- Leisurecorp
- MCR Hotels
- Alexander S. Farkas
