= Stephen Miran =

American economist (born 1983)

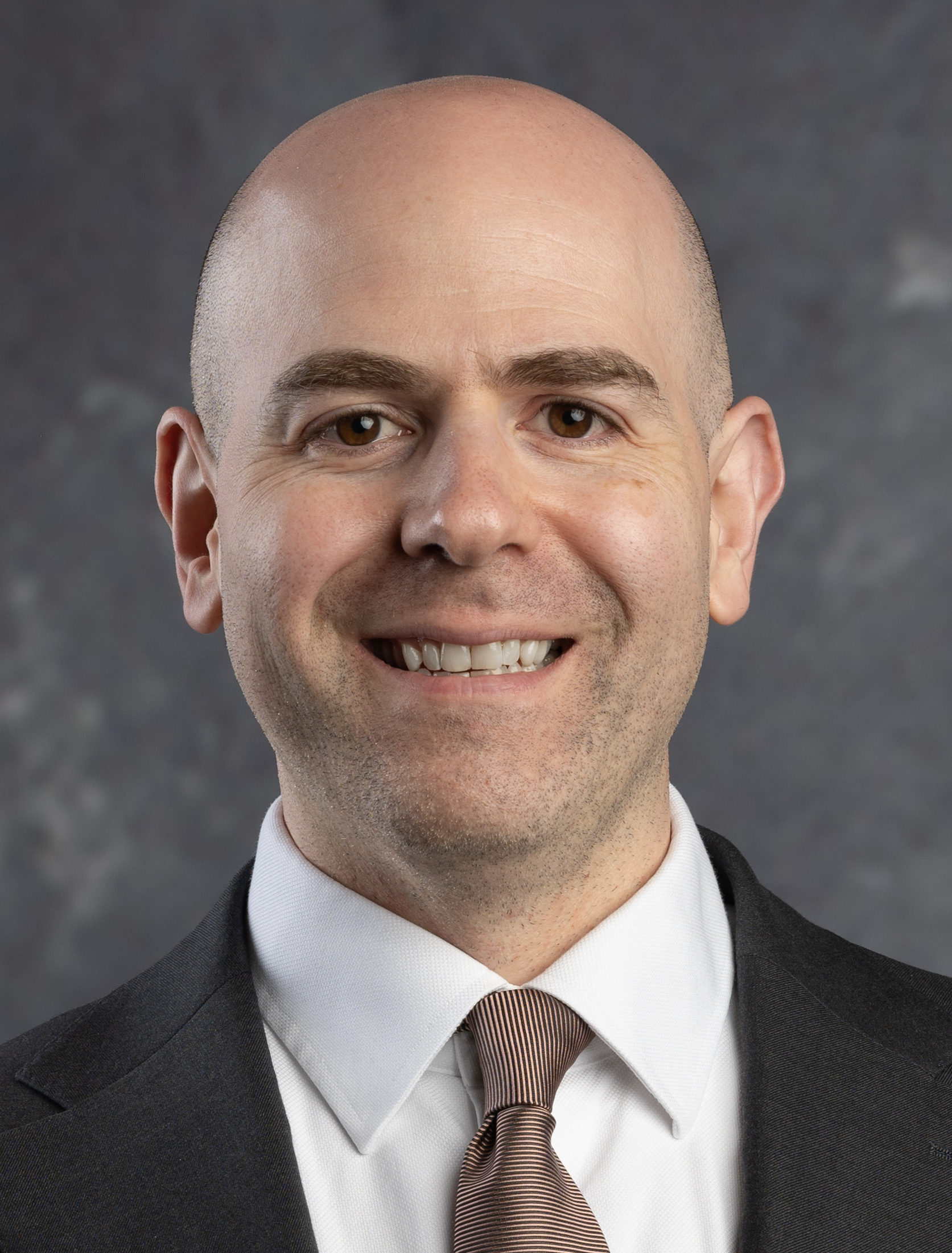
- Official portrait, 2025

Member of the Federal Reserve Board of Governors
- In office September 16, 2025 – May 22, 2026
- President: Donald Trump
- Preceded by: Adriana Kugler
- Succeeded by: Kevin Warsh

32nd Chair of the Council of Economic Advisers
- In office March 13, 2025 – February 3, 2026; On leave: September 16, 2025 – February 3, 2026
- President: Donald Trump
- Preceded by: Jared Bernstein
- Succeeded by: Christopher Phelan

Personal details
- Born: Stephen Ira Miran; June 1983 (age 43) Pearl River, New York, U.S.
- Education: Boston University (BA); Harvard University (MA, PhD)
- Scientific career
- Fields: Economics; Public policy
- Thesis: Essays on Household Saving Behavior and Fiscal Policy (2010)
- Doctoral advisor: Martin Feldstein

Stephen Ira Miran (/maɪrʌn/; MY-run; born June 1983) is an American economist who served as a member of the Federal Reserve Board of Governors from September 2025 to May 2026. Miran served as the chair of the Council of Economic Advisers from January 2025 to January 2026; he was on leave from September 2025 to January 2026.

Miran graduated from Boston University with a bachelor's degree in economics and philosophy and from Harvard University with a doctorate in economics in 2010. After graduating from Harvard, he worked for Lily Pond Capital Management as an analyst, later joining Fidelity Investments and Sovarnum Capital. Miran became the head of macroeconomic strategy at Sovarnum in 2015. In April 2020, amid the COVID-19 pandemic, he served as a senior advisor for economic strategy at the United States Department of the Treasury. After Joe Biden's inauguration in January 2021, Miran returned to the private sector, co-founding Amberwave Partners. Miran joined Hudson Bay Capital Management as a senior strategist in February 2024.

In December 2024, President Donald Trump nominated Miran for chair of the Council of Economic Advisers. He was confirmed by the United States Senate in March 2025. Miran developed the Trump administration's tariff policy. After Federal Reserve governor Adriana Kugler announced her resignation in August, Trump named Miran as his nominee to succeed Kugler. In September, he was confirmed by the Senate and sworn in that month.

== Early life and education (1983–2010) ==
Stephen Ira Miran was born in June 1983 in Pearl River, New York. Miran was born to Dan and Jane Miran. Dan and Jane were civil servants who met at the Social Security Administration. Miran graduated salutatorian from Nanuet Senior High School in May 2001. In high school, he conducted and was named to the area music festival as a senior. Miran was a National Merit finalist.

Miran attended Boston University, initially majoring in biochemistry then switching to economics and philosophy with a minor in math. Miran was inducted into the College of Arts and Sciences's chapter of Phi Beta Kappa. He graduated summa cum laude from Boston University and from Harvard University with a doctorate in economics in 2010. His doctoral advisors at Harvard included David Cutler, who served in the Clinton administration, and Martin Feldstein, who served as Ronald Reagan's chair of the Council of Economic Advisers from 1982 to 1984.

== Career ==
=== Private sector analyst and portfolio manager (2010–2020) ===
After graduating from Harvard, Miran worked for Lily Pond Capital Management as an analyst. He worked for Fidelity Investments two years later and joined Sovarnum Capital as a portfolio manager in November 2014. In 2015, Miran became the head of macroeconomic strategy at Sovarnum. He resigned in March 2020.

=== Department of the Treasury and return to the private sector (2020–2025) ===
In April 2020, amid the COVID-19 pandemic, Miran acted as a senior advisor for economic strategy at the United States Department of the Treasury. His work involved influencing the CARES Act. Miran resigned after Joe Biden's inauguration in January 2021. Miran co-founded a firm, Amberwave Partners, with Dan Katz, whom he had met at the Department of Treasury. In 2023, he left Amberwave—which later shut down—to join the Manhattan Institute. Miran contributed articles to the Manhattan Institute's City Journal, The Wall Street Journal, Barron's, and the Financial Times. He joined Hudson Bay Capital Management as a senior strategist in February 2024.

== Chair of the Council of Economic Advisers (2025–2026) ==
In February 2024, Scott Bessent began supporting Donald Trump's 2024 presidential campaign. He sought out Miran to support him. Miran donated US$1,000 to Never Surrender, a pro-Trump political action committee, and an additional US$1,000 to Trump 47, a joint fund-raising committee, that year. On December 22, Trump named Miran as his nominee for chair of the Council of Economic Advisers. In January 2025, Bloomberg News reported that Miran was among several Trump advisors studying gradual tariff hikes using the International Emergency Economic Powers Act. He appeared before the Senate Committee on Banking, Housing, and Urban Affairs on February 27. Miran affirmed his support for tariffs to encourage investment. On March 6, the Committee on Banking, Housing, and Urban Affairs voted to advance his nomination 13–11 along party lines. Miran was confirmed by the Senate on March 12.

As chair of the Council of Economic Advisers, Miran developed Trump's tariff policies; the Financial Times described him as an "architect" of Trump's tariffs. Miran's practices defied optimistic projections and early data. In response to concerns that the Council of Economic Advisers's gross domestic product estimation of the One Big Beautiful Bill Act was relatively high, Miran stated that other models had been inaccurate in the past. He resigned on February 3, 2026, to remain at the Federal Reserve.

== Federal Reserve Board of Governors (2025–2026) ==
=== Nomination and confirmation ===
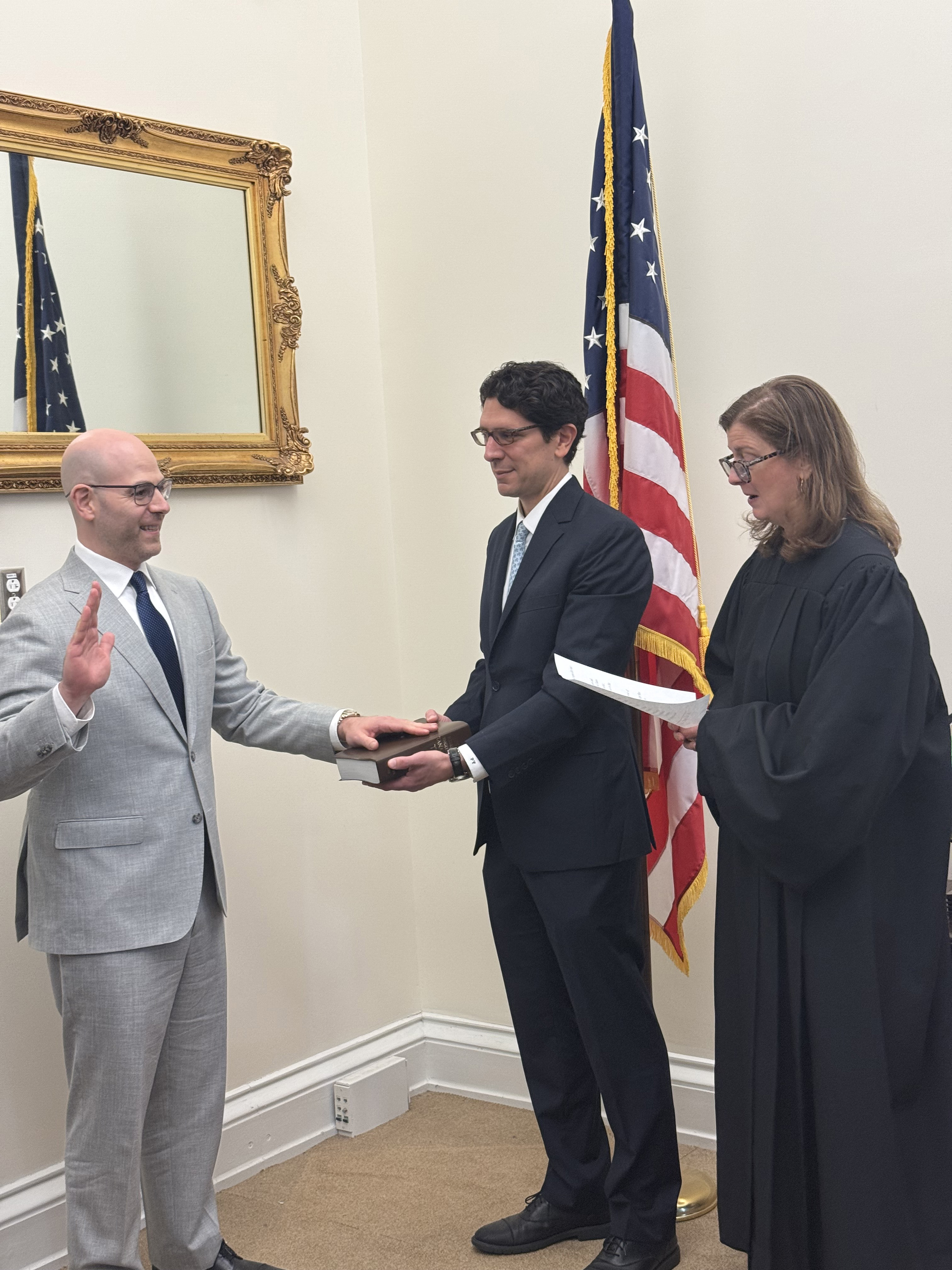
Miran is sworn in as governor on September 16, 2025.

On August 7, 2025, Trump named Miran as his nominee to succeed Adriana Kugler as a member of the Federal Reserve Board of Governors. The decision to nominate Miran occurred as Trump had stated his intention to replace Jerome Powell, the chair of the Federal Reserve; Trump signaled that he would seek a "permanent replacement" who could succeed Powell. Miran's nomination occurred amid the Senate's recess. According to The New York Times, while his tenure was to conclude within months, Miran was able to influence discussions surrounding interest rates and Powell's successor.

After Trump attempted to fire Federal Reserve Board of Governors member Lisa Cook, he privately suggested nominating Miran to replace Cook. Miran appeared before the Senate Committee on Banking, Housing, and Urban Affairs on September 4. He told the committee that he intended to keep his position as chair of the Council of Economic Advisers while serving on the Board of Governors, but that he would take an unpaid leave of absence. The unprecedented arrangement elicited concerns of violating central bank independence.

The Committee on Banking, Housing, and Urban Affairs voted to advance Miran's nomination 13–11 along party lines on September 10, positioning him to be confirmed prior to the Federal Reserve's meeting the following week. On September 15, he was confirmed by the Senate in a 48–47 vote along party lines, with the exception of Alaska senator Lisa Murkowski, a Republican who voted against Miran. He was the first member of the Federal Reserve to concurrently serve within the federal executive branch since the 1930s. Miran was sworn in the following day, as the Federal Reserve began a two-day meeting.

=== Tenure ===
Miran voted for a half-point reduction to interest rates at his first Federal Reserve meeting in September 2025. On March 4, 2026, Trump nominated Kevin Warsh to succeed Miran. The Senate confirmed Warsh on May 12, 2026.

== Views ==
=== Fiscal and monetary issues ===
In July 2024, Miran and economist Nouriel Roubini accused secretary of the treasury Janet Yellen of manipulating Treasury securities to lower borrowing costs, particularly by relying on short-dated bills and allegedly causing the equivalent of a percentage point reduction in the federal funds rate. Yellen rejected the paper's claim in an interview with Bloomberg News.

In March 2024, Miran and Dan Katz called for reforms to the Federal Reserve, including decreasing the terms of members from fourteen years to eight years, allowing members to be fired by the president, and allowing state governors to appoint Federal Reserve bank board members. Miran criticized Jerome Powell, the chair of the Federal Reserve, for encouraging Congress to pursue a large fiscal stimulus in October 2020, amid the COVID-19 pandemic. As governor, Miran has rejected concerns that he has acted on behalf of president Donald Trump in interest rate votes.

Miran supported the permanent tax cuts instituted by the One Big Beautiful Bill Act to incentivize expanded labor supply, investments, and manufacturing capacity. He praised the bill for creating jobs that would provide private insurance for current Medicaid recipients.

=== Trade and industrial policy ===
Miran is a proponent of tariffs and has argued that broad levies do not cause inflation, owing to a stronger exchange rate. He praised former Massachusetts governor Mitt Romney for threatening to impose tariffs on China; similar promises made by Trump in his 2016 presidential campaign led him to support the businessman. In November 2024, Miran published a report for Hudson Bay Capital Management titled "A User's Guide to Restructuring the Global Trading System". The paper largely formed the basis for the Mar-a-Lago Accord, a proposed economic and trade initiative. Miran advocated for a "restructuring of the global trading system". He argued that the strong dollar policy had harmed manufacturing in the United States. To weaken the United States dollar, Miran proposed selling the United States's gold reserve and investing in foreign currencies. The document received renewed attention leading up to Miran's confirmation.

Miran is a critic of the economic policy of the Joe Biden administration. In August 2021, he warned that the Build Back Better Act would worsen the inflation surge. Miran detailed his criticisms in a Manhattan Institute article in February 2024, primarily involving Biden's subsidies for electric cars and regulations on labor and the environment. He suggested that industrial policy should be motivated by the defense industry and should focus on supply-side reforms.

=== Government affairs ===
In 2024, Miran condemned the "revolving door between the executive branch and the [Federal Reserve]" in an article for the Manhattan Institute. In August 2025, after Trump fired the commissioner of labor statistics, Erika McEntarfer, Miran told Axios that the Bureau of Labor Statistics needed reform, though he did not explicitly concur with Trump's claim that McEntarfer had manipulated statistics to politically bolster Joe Biden.

Political offices
Preceded by Jared Bernstein	Chair of the Council of Economic Advisers; 2025–2026	Succeeded by Christopher Phelan
Government offices
Preceded by Adriana Kugler	Member of the Federal Reserve Board of Governors; 2025–2026	Succeeded by Kevin Warsh
