= Our Lady of the Skies Chapel at John F. Kennedy International Airport =

Our Lady of the Skies Chapel at John F. Kennedy International Airport is a Catholic chapel located at John F. Kennedy International Airport in New York City, United States.

== Description ==
The chapel was founded in 1955 by World War II veteran Bob O’Brien, who promised the Virgin Mary the creation of a shrine if he could safely return home. The original chapel was dismantled to make room for a terminal expansion for British Airways. The current chapel was rebuilt at a cost of $1 million and contains a 16-foot statue of the Virgin Mary in addition to a white marble altar and stained windows. The rebuilt chapel is estimated to service thousands of people daily and is a popular wedding destination.

The chapel is one of the few places of worship in an airport designed for a specific faith. Most other airports in the United States that have chapels or places of worship are interfaith.

== Location ==
Our Lady of the Skies Chapel at John F. Kennedy International Airport is incorporated into the second floor of Terminal 4, near the flight arrivals board.

== Legal issues ==
In 1979, Deyan Brashich, a patron of the airport, sued the airport's operator Port Authority of New York and New Jersey because of the existence of the chapel. He argued that the existence of the chapel violated his First Amendment right to freedom of religion. The United States District Court for the Southern District of New York ultimately ruled in favor of the Port Authority, noting that the chapel only accommodated religious individuals and that it did not threaten Brashich's right to worship freely.

During the case of Hawley v. the City of Cleveland, the United States Sixth Circuit Court of Appeals referenced the precedent set by Brashich v. Port Authority of New York when they ruled that a chapel located in a Cleveland airport was not in violation of the Establishment Clause of the First Amendment.
