= Airport pet relief area =

Area inside airports for animal urination

Rooftop pet relief area and dog park at John F. Kennedy International Airport Terminal 5, nicknamed "wooftop" by the Port Authority

Airport pet relief area is an area inside a United States airport security area designated for animals to urinate. They are mandated by U.S. transportation rules for working dogs and service animals since c. 2015. According to Delta Airlines, "all airports in the U.S. offer designated animal relief areas", and the United Airlines flyer app has a feature to find animal relief areas in airports.

The United States Department of Transportation mandated the areas in a 2015 rule with the justification that they will "reduce the amount of effort and discomfort experienced by individuals with disabilities when trying to relieve their service animals during a layover". Cost of implementation is estimated at over $80 million.

Airport relief areas operated by the Port Authority of New York and New Jersey and the Port of Seattle's Seattle–Tacoma International Airport include replica fire hydrants. The Seattle indoor pet relief area predated the 2015 mandate. Other airports with relief areas inside the security zone, predating the mandate, include San Diego Lindbergh Field, Dallas Fort Worth International Airport, and Minneapolis-Saint Paul International Airport. John F. Kennedy International Airport's Terminal 5 has what USA Today calls "the first post-security dog walk area on a rooftop", which opened in 2015.
