= John F. Kennedy International Airport =

International airport serving New York City

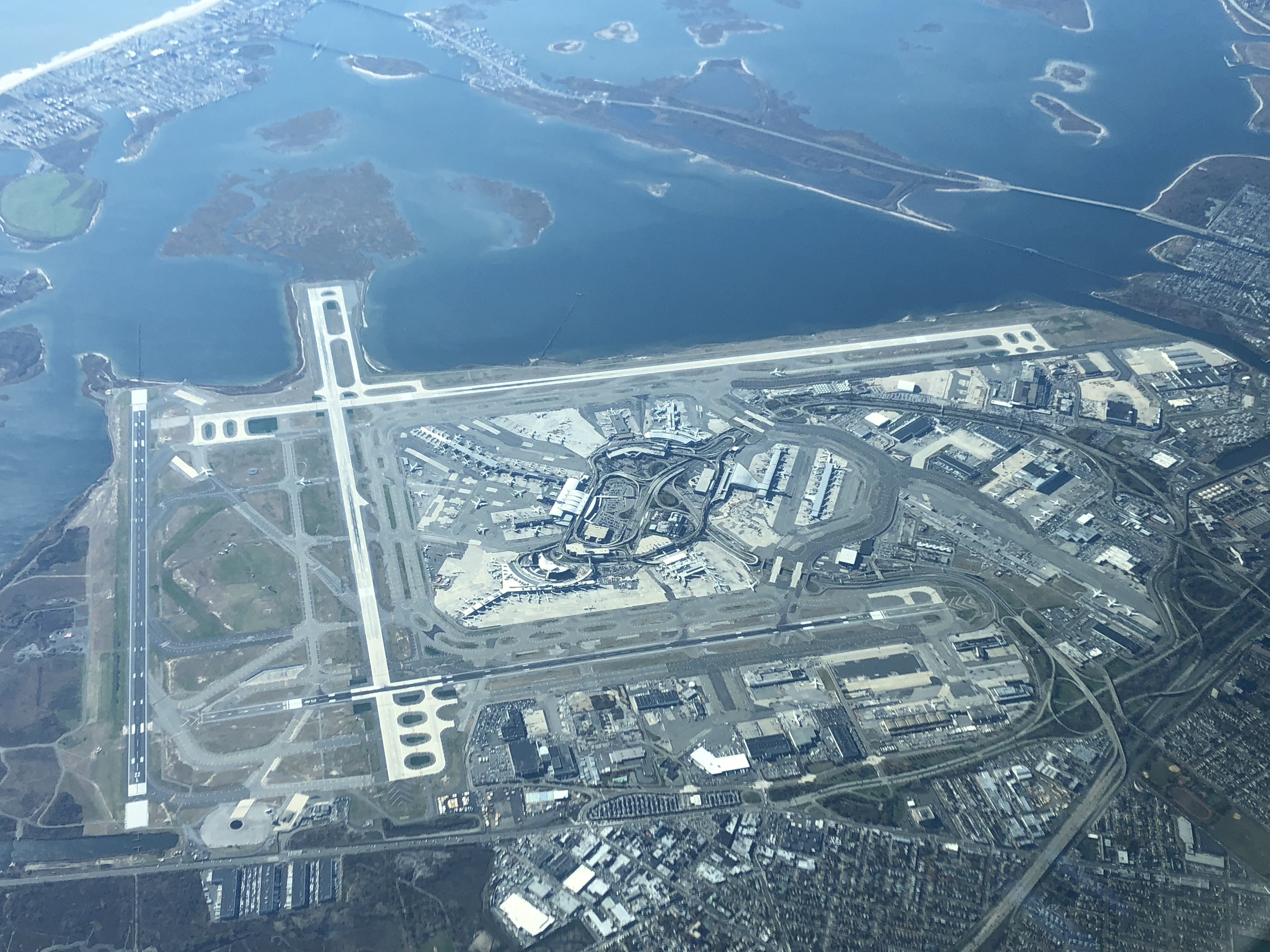
- Aerial view of John F. Kennedy International Airport
- IATA: JFK; ICAO: KJFK; FAA LID: JFK; WMO: 74486

Summary
- Airport type: Public
- Owner: City of New York
- Operator: Port Authority of New York and New Jersey
- Serves: New York metropolitan area
- Location: Jamaica, Queens, New York City, U.S.
- Opened: July 1, 1948; 78 years ago
- Hub for: American Airlines; Atlas Air; Delta Air Lines; Kalitta Air
- Focus city for: JetBlue; Polar Air Cargo
- Operating base for: Norse Atlantic Airways
- Time zone: EST (UTC−05:00)
  - Summer (DST): EDT (UTC−04:00)
- Elevation AMSL: 4 m (13 ft)
- Coordinates: 40°38′23″N 73°46′44″W
- Website: www.jfkairport.com

Maps
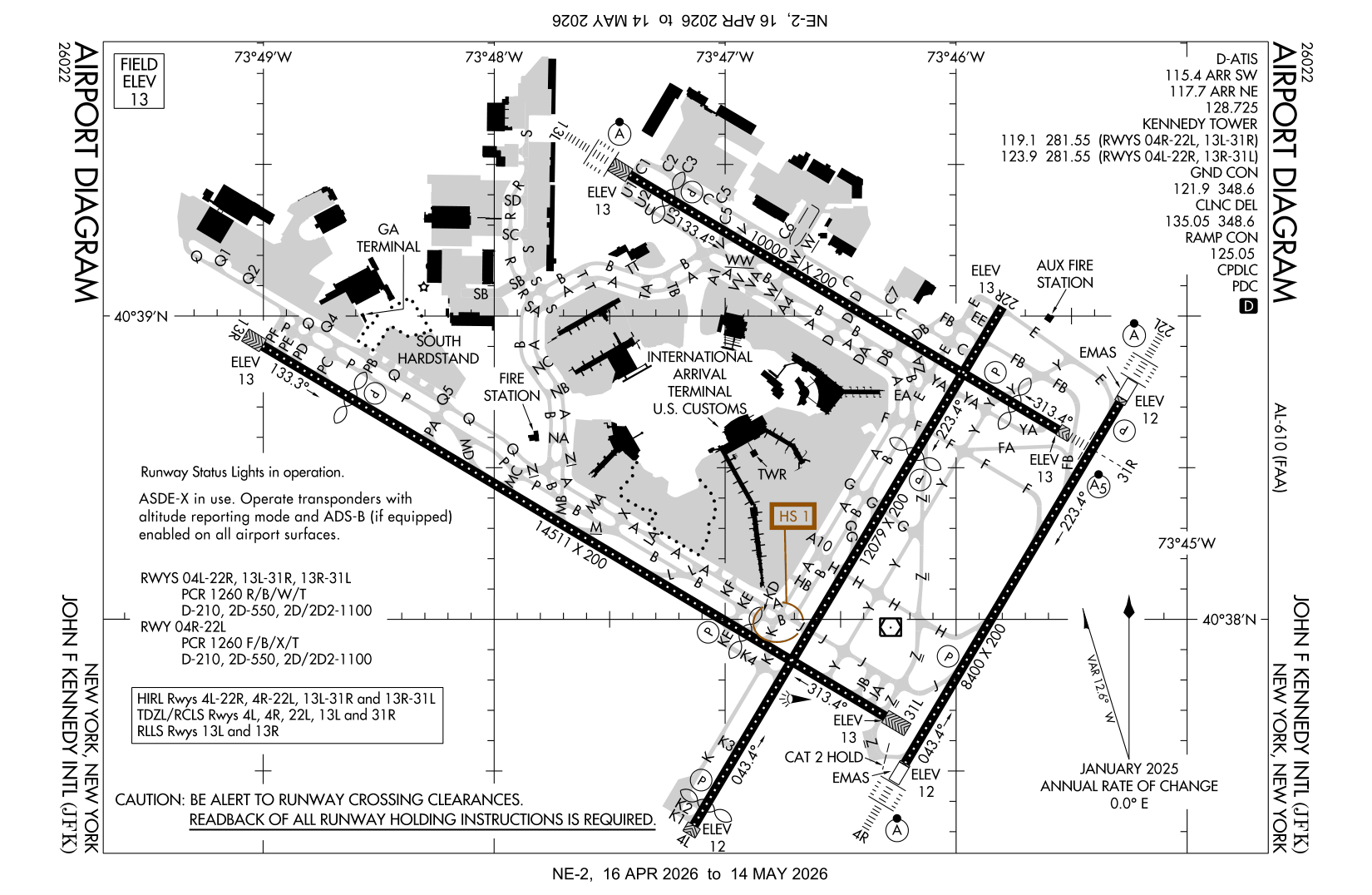
- FAA airport diagram
- Interactive map of John F. Kennedy International Airport

Runways
Direction	Length		Surface
Direction	m	ft	Surface
4L/22R	3,682	12,079	Concrete
4R/22L	2,560	8,400	Asphalt
13L/31R	3,048	10,000	Concrete
13R/31L	4,423	14,511	Concrete

Statistics (2025)
- Passengers: 62,629,455 ▼1.0%
- Aircraft movements: 464,281
- Cargo (US tons): 1,557,067 (1,412,547 tonnes)
- Source: Port Authority of New York and New Jersey FAA

John F. Kennedy International Airport (Note: Colloquially referred to as JFK, JFK Airport and Kennedy Airport.) (IATA: JFK, ICAO: KJFK, FAA LID: JFK) is the primary international airport serving the New York metropolitan area. It is located on the southwestern shore of Long Island, in Queens, New York City, bordering Jamaica Bay. It is the busiest of the three airports in the New York airport system and the sixth-busiest airport in the United States. The airport, which covers 5,200 acres (2,104 ha), is the largest in the New York metropolitan area. Nearly 100 airlines operate from JFK Airport, with nonstop or direct flights to destinations on all six permanently inhabited continents.

JFK Airport is located in the Jamaica neighborhood of Queens, 16 miles (26 km) southeast of Midtown Manhattan. The airport features five passenger terminals and four runways. It is primarily accessible by car, bus, shuttle, or other vehicular transit via the JFK Expressway or Interstate 678 (Van Wyck Expressway), or by train. JFK is a hub for American Airlines and Delta Air Lines as well as the primary operating base for JetBlue. The airport is also a former hub for Braniff, Eastern, Flying Tigers, National, Northeast, Northwest, Pan Am, Seaboard World, Tower Air, and TWA.

The facility opened in 1948 as New York International Airport and was commonly known as Idlewild Airport. The airport was renamed John F. Kennedy International Airport in late 1963 in tribute to President Kennedy following his assassination earlier in the year.

== History ==
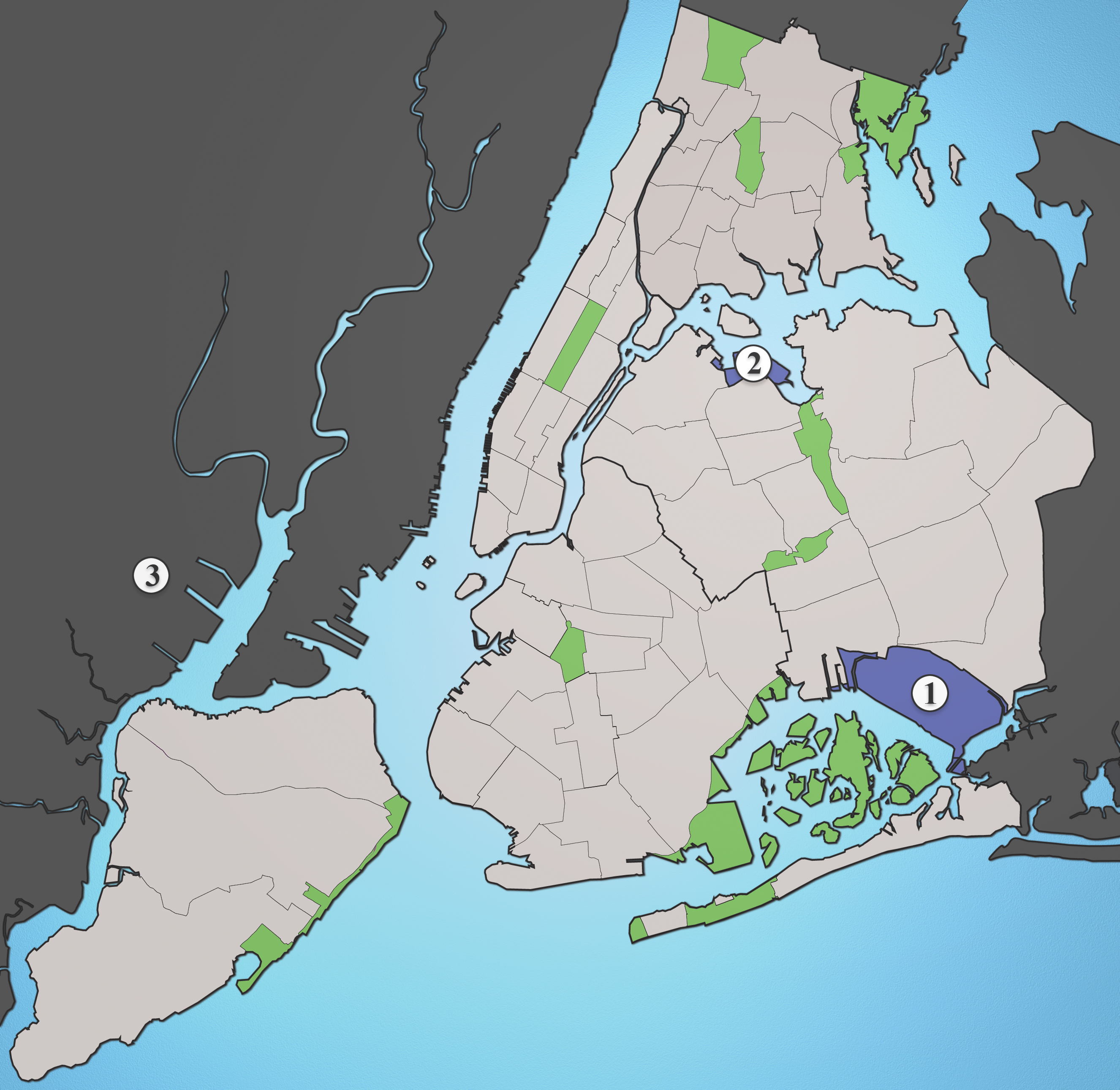
Map showing New York City and the locations of JFK Airport (1), LaGuardia Airport (2), Newark Airport (3)

=== Construction ===
What would become known as John F. Kennedy International Airport opened in 1948 as New York International Airport though it was commonly known as Idlewild Airport (IATA: IDL, ICAO: KIDL, FAA LID: IDL) after the Idlewild Beach Golf Course that it displaced. It was built to relieve LaGuardia Field, which had become overcrowded after its 1939 opening. In late 1941, mayor Fiorello La Guardia announced that the city had tentatively chosen a large area of marshland on Jamaica Bay, which included the Idlewild Golf Course as well as a summer hotel and a landing strip called the Jamaica Sea-Airport, for a new airfield. Title to the land was conveyed to the city at the end of December 1941. Construction began in 1943, though the airport's final layout was not yet decided upon.

About US$60 million was initially spent with governmental funding, but only 1,000 acres (400 ha) of the Idlewild Golf Course site were earmarked for use. The project was renamed Major General Alexander E. Anderson Airport in 1943 after a Queens resident who had commanded a Federalized National Guard unit in the southern United States and died in late 1942. The renaming was vetoed by Mayor La Guardia and reinstated by the New York City Council; in common usage, the airport was still called "Idlewild". In 1944, the New York City Board of Estimate authorized the condemnation of another 1,350 acres (550 ha) for Idlewild. The Port of New York Authority (now the Port Authority of New York and New Jersey) leased the Idlewild property from the City of New York in 1947 and maintains this lease today. In March 1948, the City Council changed the official name to New York International Airport, Anderson Field, but the common name remained "Idlewild" until December 24, 1963. The airport was intended as the world's largest and most efficient, with "no confusion and no congestion".

=== Early operations ===
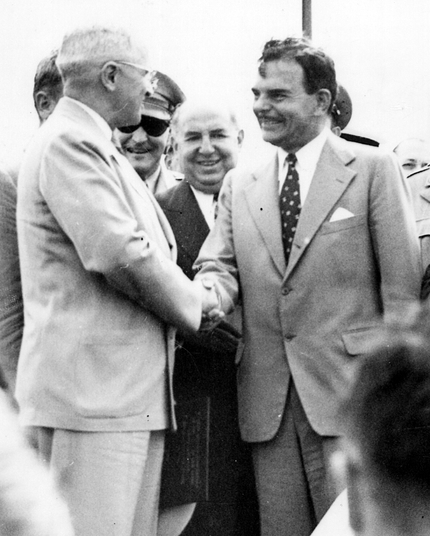
President Truman (left) with Governor Dewey (right) at dedication of the Idlewild Airport

The first flight from Idlewild was on July 1, 1948, with the opening ceremony attended by U.S. President Harry S. Truman and Governor of New York Thomas E. Dewey, who were both running for president in that year's presidential election. The Port Authority cancelled foreign airlines' permits to use LaGuardia, forcing them to move to Idlewild during the next couple of years. Idlewild at the time had a single 79,280-square-foot (7,365 m^{2}) terminal building; by 1949, the terminal building was being expanded to 215,501 square feet (20,021 m^{2}). Further expansions would come in following years, including a control tower in 1952, as well as new and expanded buildings and taxiways.

Idlewild opened with six runways and a seventh under construction; runways 1L and 7L were held in reserve and never came into use as runways. Runway 31R (originally 8,000 ft or 2,438 m) is still in use; runway 31L (originally 9,500 ft or 2,896 m) opened soon after the rest of the airport and is still in use; runway 1R closed in 1957 and runway 7R closed around 1966. Runway 4 (originally 8,000 ft, now runway 4L) opened June 1949 and runway 4R was added ten years later. A smaller runway 14/32 was built after runway 7R closed and was used until 1990 by general aviation, STOL, and smaller commuter flights.

The first jet airliner to land at Idlewild was an Avro Jetliner flying from Malton Airport in Toronto carrying the world's first cargo of jet airmail on April 18, 1950. A 1951 policy instituted by the Port Authority effectively prohibited jets from landing at the city's airports. After tests demonstrating that it was no noisier than the loudest of the then-current propeller plane, approval was granted for a Sud Aviation Caravelle prototype to be the next jet airliner to land at Idlewild, on May 2, 1957. Later in 1957, the Soviet Union sought approval for two jet-powered Tupolev Tu-104 flights carrying diplomats to land at Idlewild; the Port Authority did not allow them, saying noise tests had to be done first.

In 1951, the airport averaged 73 daily airline operations (takeoffs plus landings); the October 1951 Airline Guide shows nine domestic departures a day on National and Northwest. Much of Newark Airport's traffic shifted to Idlewild (which averaged 242 daily airline operations in 1952) when Newark was temporarily closed in February 1952 after a series of three plane crashes in the two preceding months in Elizabeth, all of which had fatalities; flights were shifted to Idlewild and La Guardia, which were both able to have planes take off and land over the water, rather than over the densely populated areas surrounding Newark Airport. The airport remained closed in Newark until November 1952, with new flight patterns that took planes away from Elizabeth. L-1049 Constellations and DC-7s appeared between 1951 and 1953 and did not use LaGuardia for their first several years, bringing more traffic to Idlewild. The April 1957 Airline Guide cites a total of 1,283 departures a week, including about 250 from Eastern Air Lines, 150 from National Airlines and 130 from Pan American.

=== Separate terminals ===
By 1954, Idlewild had the highest volume of international air traffic of any airport globally. The Port of New York Authority originally planned a single 55-gate terminal, but the major airlines did not agree with this plan, arguing that the terminal would be far too small for future traffic. Architect Wallace Harrison then designed a plan for each major airline at the airport to be given its own space to develop its own terminal. This scheme made construction more practical, made terminals more navigable, and introduced incentives for airlines to compete with each other for the best design. The revised plan met airline approval in 1955, with seven terminals initially planned. Five terminals were for individual airlines, one was for three airlines, and one was for international arrivals (National Airlines and British Airways arrived later). In addition, there would be an 11-story control tower, roadways, parking lots, taxiways, and a reflecting lagoon in the center. The airport was designed for aircraft up to 300,000-pound (140,000 kg) gross weight The airport had to be modified in the late 1960s to accommodate the Boeing 747's weight.

The International Arrivals Building, or IAB, was the first new terminal at the airport, opening in December 1957. The building was designed by SOM. The terminal stretched nearly 2,300 feet (700 meters) and was parallel to runway 7R. The terminal had "finger" piers at right angles to the main building allowing more aircraft to park, an innovation at the time. The building was expanded in 1970 to accommodate jetways. Nonetheless, by the 1990s the overcrowded building was showing its age and it did not provide adequate space for security checkpoints. It was demolished in 2000 and replaced with Terminal 4.

United Airlines and Delta Air Lines opened Terminal 7 (later renumbered Terminal 9), a SOM design similar to the IAB, in October 1959. It was demolished in 2008.

Eastern Air Lines opened their Chester L. Churchill-designed Terminal 1 in November 1959. The terminal was demolished in 1995 and replaced with the current Terminal 1.

American Airlines opened Terminal 8 in February 1960. It was designed by Kahn and Jacobs and had a 317-foot (97 m) stained-glass facade designed by Robert Sowers, the largest stained-glass installation in the world until 1979. The facade was removed in 2007 as the terminal was demolished to make room for the new Terminal 8; American cited the prohibitive cost of removing the enormous installation.

Pan American World Airways opened the Worldport (later Terminal 3) in 1960, designed by Tippetts-Abbett-McCarthy-Stratton. It featured a large, elliptical roof suspended by 32 sets of radial posts and cables; the roof extended 114 feet (35 m) beyond the base of the terminal to cover the passenger loading area. It was one of the first airline terminals in the world to feature jetways that connected to the terminal and that could be moved to provide an easy walkway for passengers from the terminal to a docked aircraft. Jetways replaced the need to have to board the plane outside via airstairs that descend from an aircraft, truck-mounted mobile stairs, or wheeled stairs. The Worldport was demolished in 2013.

Trans World Airlines opened the TWA Flight Center in 1962, designed by Eero Saarinen with a distinctive winged-bird shape. With the demise of TWA in 2001, the terminal remained vacant until 2005 when JetBlue and the Port Authority of New York and New Jersey (PANYNJ) financed the construction of a new 26-gate terminal partly encircling the Saarinen building. Called Terminal 5 (Now T5), the new terminal opened on October 22, 2008. T5 is connected to the Saarinen central building through the original passenger departure-arrival tubes that connected the building to the outlying gates. The original Saarinen terminal, also known as the head house, has since been converted into the TWA Hotel.

Northwest Orient, Braniff International Airways, and Northeast Airlines opened a joint terminal in November 1962 (later Terminal 2). It was demolished in 2023 to make way for a new Terminal 1.

National Airlines opened the Sundrome (later Terminal 6) in 1969. The terminal was designed by I. M. Pei. It was unique for its use of all-glass mullions dividing the window sections, unprecedented at the time. On October 30, 2000, United Airlines and the Port Authority of New York and New Jersey announced plans to redevelop this terminal and the TWA Flight Center as a new United terminal. Terminal 6 was used by JetBlue from 2001 until JetBlue moved to Terminal 5 in 2008. The Sundrome was demolished in October 2011 to make room for additional gates at JetBlue's Terminal 5.

=== Later operation ===
The airport was renamed John F. Kennedy International Airport on December 24, 1963, a month and two days after the assassination of President John F. Kennedy; Mayor Robert F. Wagner Jr. proposed the renaming. The now-renamed Kennedy International Airport was given the code KIA, which was changed in 1968 to JFK to avoid an association with the term killed in action in the Vietnam War era. The IDL and KIDL codes have since been reassigned to Indianola Municipal Airport in Mississippi.

Airlines began scheduling jets to Idlewild in 1958–59; LaGuardia did not get jets until 1964, and JFK became New York's busiest airport. It had more airline takeoffs and landings than LaGuardia and Newark combined from 1962 to 1967 and was the second-busiest airport in the country, peaking at 403,981 airline operations in 1967. LaGuardia received a new terminal and longer runways from 1960 to 1966. By the mid-1970s, the two airports had roughly equal airline traffic (by flight count); Newark was in third place until the 1980s, except during LaGuardia's reconstruction. Concorde, operated by Air France and British Airways, made scheduled trans-Atlantic supersonic flights to JFK from November 22, 1977, until its retirement by British Airways on October 24, 2003. Air France had retired the aircraft in May 2003.

Construction of the AirTrain JFK people-mover system began in 1998, after decades of planning for a direct rail link to the airport. Although the system was originally scheduled to open in 2002, it opened on December 17, 2003, after delays caused by construction and a fatal crash. The rail network links each airport terminal to the New York City Subway and the Long Island Rail Road at Howard Beach and Jamaica.

The airport's new Terminal 1 opened on May 28, 1998; Terminal 4, the $1.4 billion replacement for the International Arrivals Building, opened on May 24, 2001. JetBlue's Terminal 5 incorporates the TWA Flight Center, and Terminals 8 and 9 were demolished and rebuilt as Terminal 8 for the American Airlines hub. The Port Authority Board of Commissioners approved a $20 million planning study for the redevelopment of Terminals 2 and 3, the Delta Air Lines hub, in 2008.

On March 19, 2007, JFK was the first airport in the United States to receive a passenger Airbus A380 flight. The route, with an over-500-passenger capacity, was operated by Lufthansa and Airbus and arrived at Terminal 1. On August 1, 2008, it received the first regularly scheduled commercial A380 flight to the United States (on Emirates' New York–Dubai route) at Terminal 4. Although the service was suspended in 2009 due to poor demand, the aircraft was reintroduced in November 2010. Airlines operating A380s to JFK include Singapore Airlines (on its New York–Frankfurt–Singapore route), Lufthansa (on its New York–Frankfurt route), Korean Air (on its New York–Seoul route), Asiana Airlines (on its New York–Seoul route), Etihad Airways (on its New York–Abu Dhabi route), and Emirates (on its New York–Milan–Dubai and New York–Dubai routes). On December 8, 2015, JFK was the first U.S. airport to receive a commercial Airbus A350 flight when Qatar Airways began using the aircraft on one of its New York–Doha routes.

The airport currently hosts the world's longest flight, Singapore Airlines Flights 23 and 24 (SQ23 and SQ24), at 15,349 km (9,537 mi, 8,288 nmi). The route was launched in 2020 between Singapore and New York JFK, and uses the Airbus A350-900ULR.

=== Major robberies ===
==== Air France robbery ====
The Air France robbery took place in April 1967 when associates of the Lucchese crime family stole $420,000 (equivalent of approximately $4.1 million in 2025) from the Air France cargo terminal at the airport. It was the largest cash robbery in the United States at the time. It was carried out by Henry Hill, Robert McMahon, Tommy DeSimone and Montague Montemurro, on a tip-off from McMahon. Hill believed it was the Air France robbery that endeared him to the Mafia.

Air France was contracted to transport American currency that had been exchanged in Southeast Asia for deposit in the United States. Their aircraft regularly delivered three or four $60,000 packages at a time. Hill and associates obtained a key to a cement block strong room where the money was stored. They entered the unsecured cargo terminal and entered the strong room unchallenged. They took seven bags in a large suitcase. The theft was not discovered until the following Monday.

==== Lufthansa heist ====
The Lufthansa heist took place on December 11, 1978, at the airport. The robbery netted an estimated US$5.875 million (equivalent to US$29 million in 2025), including US$5 million in cash and US$875,000 in jewelry. It was the largest cash robbery committed on American soil at the time.

James Burke, an associate of the Lucchese crime family of New York, was believed to be the mastermind behind the robbery, but was never charged with the crime. Burke is also alleged to have either committed or ordered the murders of many in the robbery, both to avoid being implicated in the heist and to keep their shares of the money for himself. The only person convicted in the Lufthansa heist was Louis Werner, an airport worker involved with the planning.

The money and jewellery have never been recovered. The heist's magnitude made it one of the longest-investigated crimes in U.S. history; the latest arrest associated with the robbery was made in 2014, which resulted in acquittal.

== Access ==
=== Rail ===
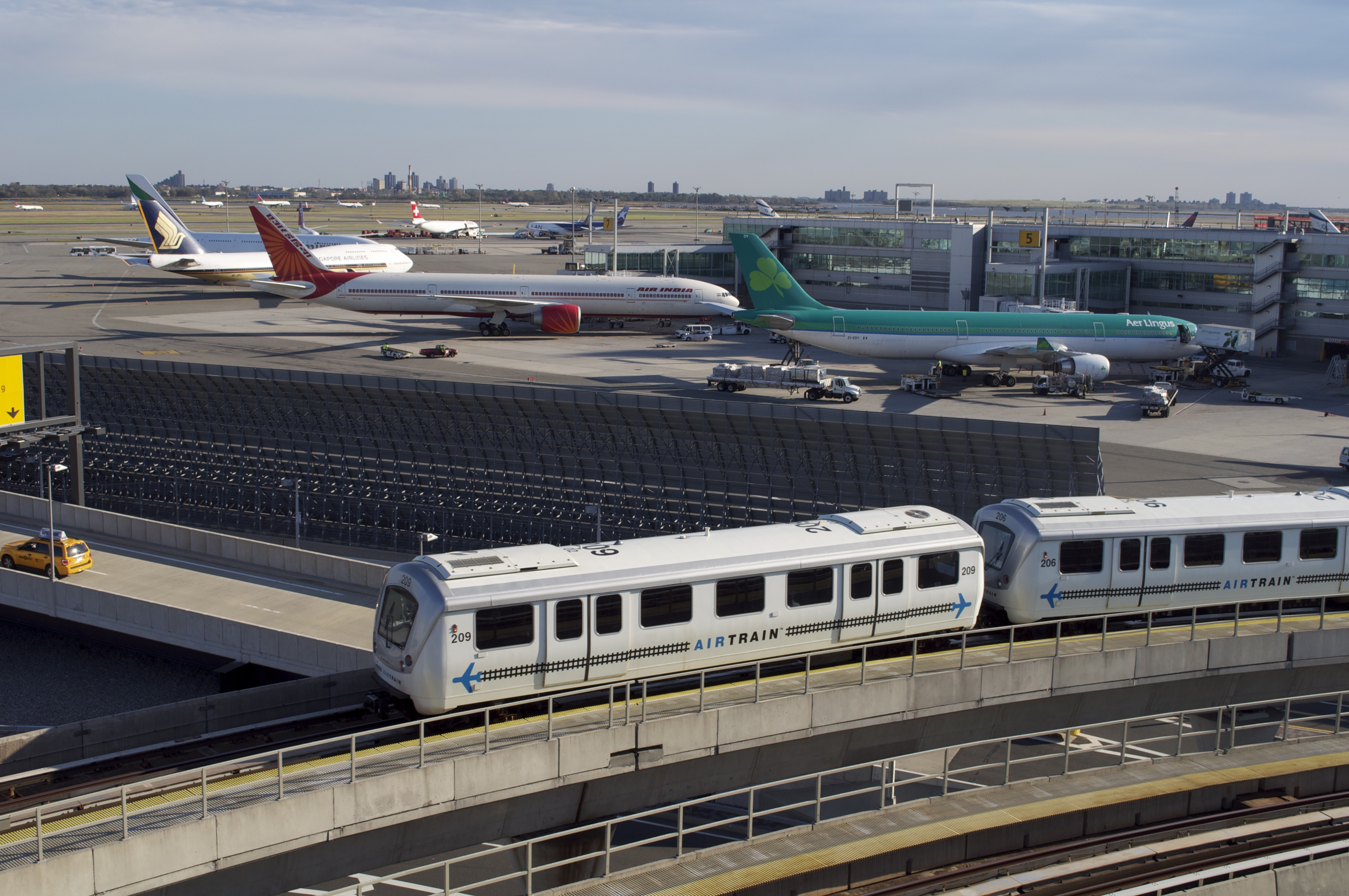
AirTrain JFK in 2011, with Terminal 4 in the background

All lines of AirTrain JFK, the airport's dedicated rail network, stop at each passenger terminal. The system also serves Federal Circle, the JFK long-term parking lot, and two multimodal rapid transit stations: Howard Beach and Jamaica. While AirTrain travel within airport property is complimentary, external transfers at the latter two locations are paid via OMNY or MetroCard and provide access to the New York City Subway, Long Island Rail Road, and MTA Bus services.

=== Bus ===
As of 2025, only the Q3 bus serves Terminal 8. The Q6 and Q7 serve JFK's cargo terminals. The Q10, Q80 and B15 serve the Lefferts Boulevard station on the AirTrain and it includes a free transfer. Bus fares are paid via OMNY or MetroCard, with free transfers provided to New York City Subway services.

=== Vehicle ===
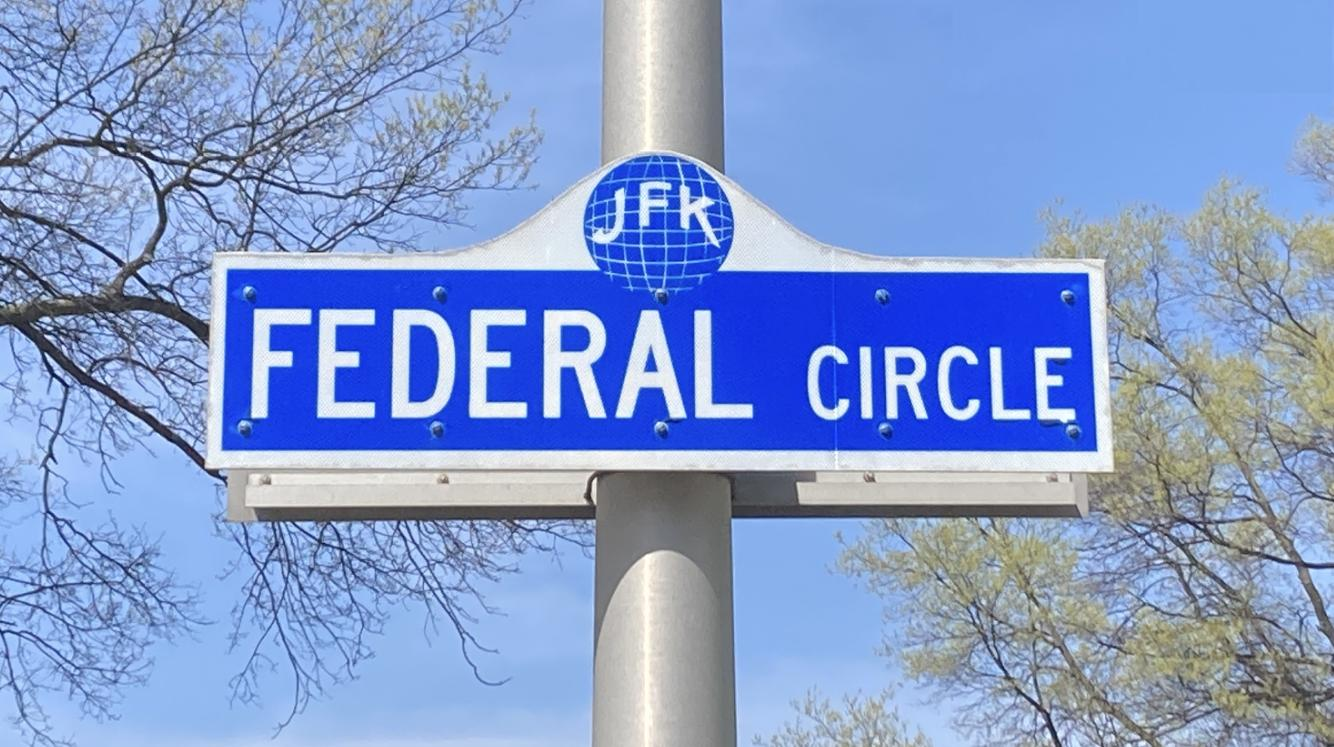
A street sign near Federal Circle

Vehicles primarily access the airport via the Van Wyck Expressway (I-678) or JFK Expressway, both of which are connected to the Belt Parkway and various surface streets in South Ozone Park and Springfield Gardens. The airport operates parking facilities consisting of multi-level terminal garages, surface spaces in the Central Terminal Area, and a long-term parking lot with total accommodation for more than 17,000 vehicles. A travel plaza on airport property also contains a food court, filling station, and originally four Tesla Superchargers. These were later replaced with a new station with 12 stalls.

Taxis and other for-hire vehicles (FHV) serving JFK are licensed by the New York City Taxi & Limousine Commission. In 2019, PANYNJ approved the implementation of "airport access fee" surcharges on FHV and taxi trips, with the revenue earmarked to support the agency's capital programs.

== Terminals ==
=== Overview ===
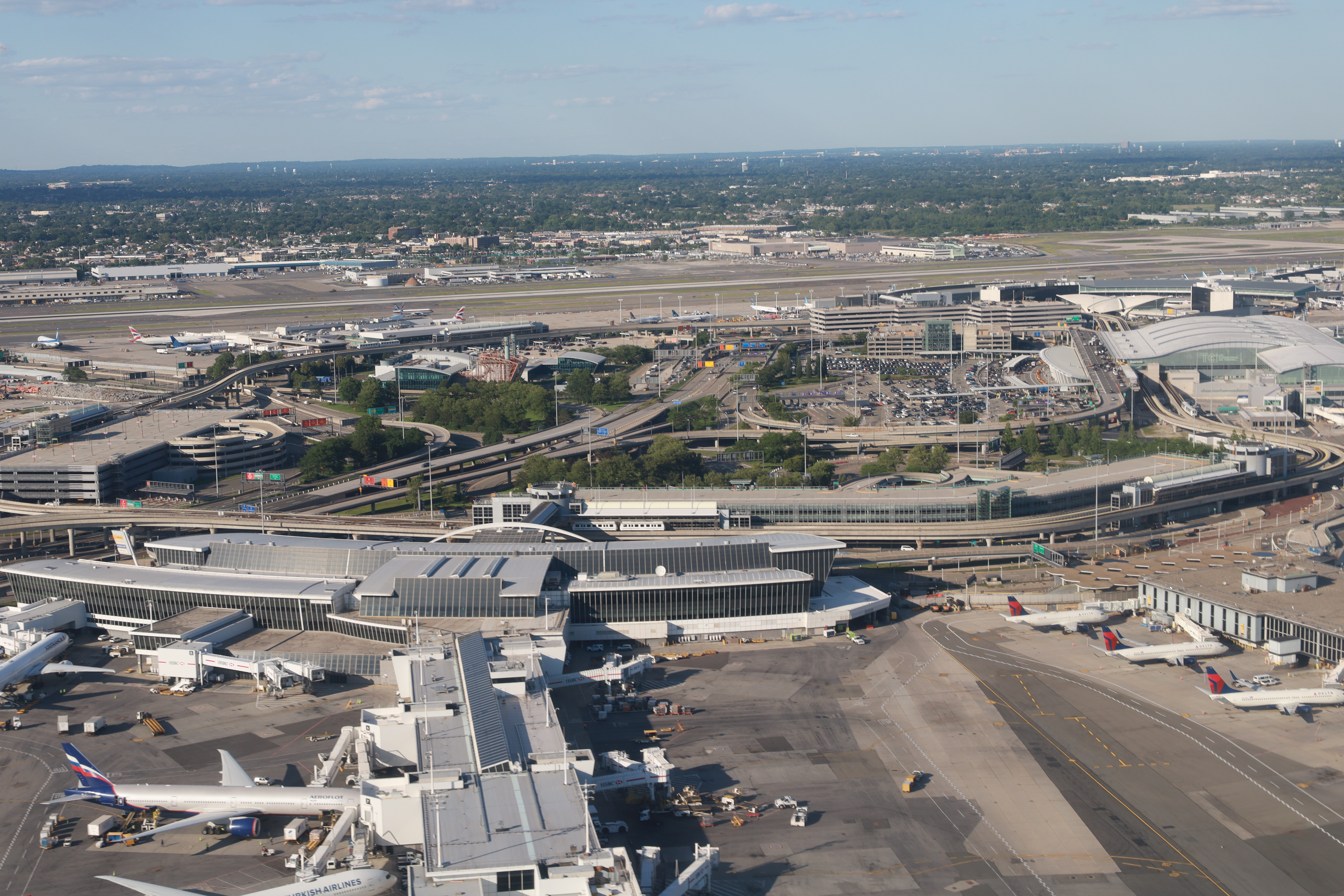
Aerial view of the terminals in 2021

JFK has five active terminals, containing 130 gates in total. The terminals are numbered 1, 4, 5, 7, and 8.

The terminal buildings, except for the former Tower Air terminal, are arranged in a deformed U-shaped wavy pattern around a central area containing parking, a power plant, and other airport facilities. The terminals are connected by the AirTrain system and access roads. Directional signage throughout the terminals was designed by Paul Mijksenaar. A 2006 survey by J.D. Power and Associates in conjunction with Aviation Week found that JFK ranked second in overall traveller satisfaction among large airports in the United States, behind Harry Reid International Airport, which serves the Las Vegas metropolitan area.

Until the early 1990s, each terminal was known by the primary airline that served it, except for Terminal 4, which was known as the International Arrivals Building. In the early 1990s, all terminals were given numbers except for the Tower Air terminal, which sat outside the Central Terminals area and was not numbered. Like the other airports controlled by the Port Authority, JFK's terminals are sometimes managed and maintained by independent terminal operators. At JFK, all terminals are managed by airlines or consortiums of the airlines serving them, except for the Schiphol Group-operated Terminal 4. All terminals can handle international arrivals that are not pre-cleared.

Many inter-terminal connections require passengers to exit security, then use the AirTrain to get to the other terminal, then re-clear security.

=== Terminal 1 ===
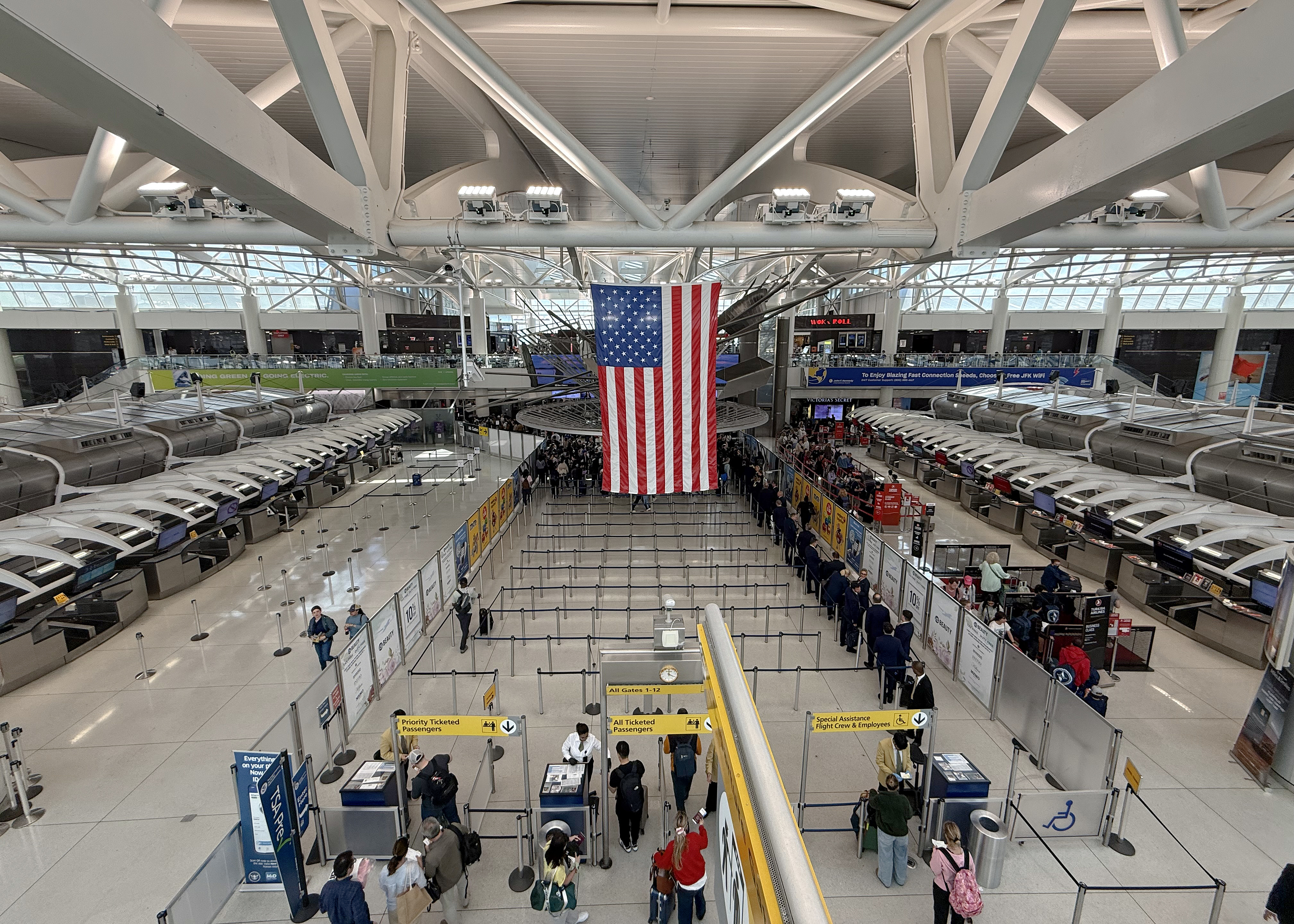
Terminal 1

Terminal 1 opened in 1998, 50 years after the opening of JFK, at the direction of the Terminal One Group, a consortium of four key operating carriers: Air France, Japan Airlines, Korean Air, and Lufthansa. This partnership was founded after the four airlines reached an agreement that the then-existing international carrier facilities were inadequate for their needs. The Eastern Air Lines terminal was located on the site of present-day Terminal 1.

Terminal 1 is served by SkyTeam carriers Air France, China Eastern Airlines, Korean Air, Saudia, and Scandinavian Airlines; Star Alliance carriers Air China, Air New Zealand, Asiana Airlines, Austrian Airlines, Brussels Airlines, Egyptair, EVA Air, ITA Airways, LOT Polish Airlines, Lufthansa, Swiss International Air Lines, TAP Air Portugal, and Turkish Airlines; and Oneworld carrier Royal Air Maroc. Other airlines serving Terminal 1 include Air Serbia, Azores Airlines, Gulf Air, Philippine Airlines, and Viva.

Terminal 1 was designed by William Nicholas Bodouva + Associates. It and Terminal 4 are the two terminals at JFK Airport with the capability of handling the Airbus A380 aircraft, which Korean Air flies on the route from Seoul–Incheon and Lufthansa from Munich. Air France operated Concorde here until 2003. Terminal 1 has 11 gates.

=== Terminal 4 ===
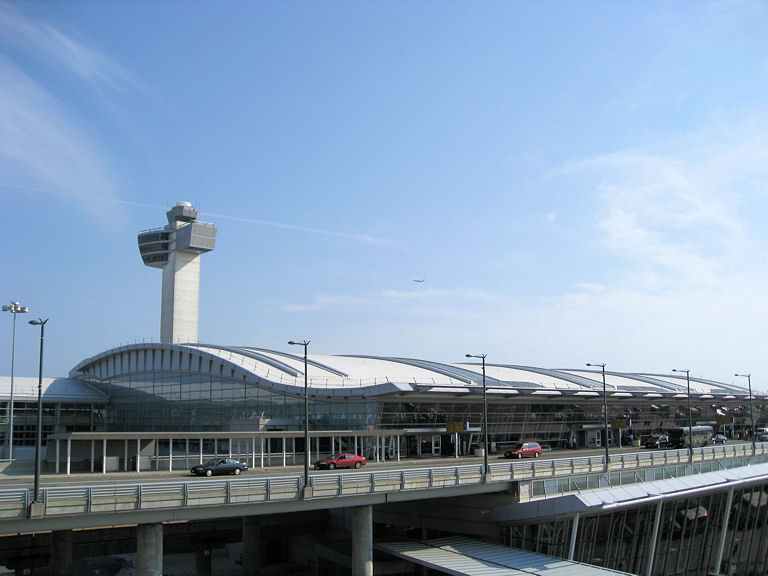
Terminal 4 replaced the former International Arrivals Building in May 2001.

Terminal 4, developed by LCOR, Inc., is managed by JFKIAT (IAT) LLC, a subsidiary of the Schiphol Group and was the first in the United States to be managed by a foreign airport operator. Terminal 4 currently contains 48 gates in two concourses and functions as the hub for Delta Air Lines at JFK.

- Concourse A (gates A2–A12, A14–A17, A19, and A21) serves primarily Asian and some European airlines along with Delta Connection flights.
- Concourse B (gates B20, B22-B55) primarily serves both domestic and international flights of Delta and its SkyTeam partners.

Airlines servicing Terminal 4 include SkyTeam carriers Aeromexico, Air Europa, China Airlines, Delta Air Lines, Kenya Airways, KLM, Virgin Atlantic, and XiamenAir; Star Alliance carriers Air India, Avianca, Copa Airlines, and Singapore Airlines; and non-alliance carriers Arkia, Caribbean Airlines, El Al, Emirates, Etihad Airways, JetBlue (late night international arrivals only), LATAM Brasil, LATAM Chile, LATAM Ecuador, LATAM Perú, Uzbekistan Airways, and WestJet. Like Terminal 1, the facility is Airbus A380-compatible with service currently provided by Emirates to Dubai (both non-stop and one-stop via Milan), and Etihad Airways to Abu Dhabi.

Opened in early 2001 and designed by SOM, the 1.5-million-square-foot (140,000 m^{2}) facility was built for $1.4 billion and replaced JFK's old International Arrivals Building (IAB), which opened in 1957 and was designed by the same architectural firm. The new construction incorporated a mezzanine-level AirTrain station, an expansive check-in hall, and a four-block-long retail area.

Terminal 4 has seen multiple expansions over the years. On May 24, 2013, the completion of a $1.4 billion project added mechanized checked-bag screening, a centralized security checkpoint (consolidating two checkpoints into one new fourth-floor location), nine international gates, improved U.S. Customs and Border Protection facilities, and, at the time, the largest Sky Club lounge in Delta's network. Later that year, the expansion also improved passenger connectivity with Terminal 2 by bolstering inter-terminal JFK Jitney shuttle bus service and building a dedicated 8,000 square-foot bus holdroom facility adjacent to gate B20. Also in 2013, Delta, JFKIAT and the Port Authority agreed to a further $175 million Phase II expansion, which called for 11 new regional jet gates to supersede capacity previously provided by the soon-to-be-demolished Terminal 2 hardstands and Terminal 3. Delta sought funding from the New York City Industrial Development Agency, and work on Phase II was completed in January 2015.

By 2017, plans to expand Terminal 4's passenger capacity were being floated in conjunction with a more significant JFK modernization proposal. In early 2020, Governor Cuomo announced that the Port Authority and Delta/IAT had agreed to terms extending Concourse A by 16 domestic gates, renovating the arrival/departure halls, and improving land-side roadways for $3.8 billion. By April 2021, that plan had been scaled-back to $1.5 billion worth of improvements as a result of financial hardships imposed by the COVID-19 pandemic. The revised plan called for arrival/departure hall modernization and just ten new gates in Concourse A. Consolidation of Delta's operations within Terminal 4 occurred in early 2023, along with the new gates opening. Delta also opened a new Sky Club in Concourse A. The airline plans to open a lounge exclusive to Delta One customers by June 2024. It would be the largest in the airline's network.

In 2019, American Express began construction of a Centurion lounge that subsequently opened in October 2020. The structural addition extends the headhouse between the control tower and gate A2, and includes 15,000 square-feet of dining, bars, and fitness facilities.

In 2024, Terminal 4 announced an expansion of its Arts & Culture program with a digital and static photography exhibit in collaboration with the Cradle of Aviation Museum; a mural representing Queens by local artist Zeehan Wazed; a series of photographs by Terminal 4 employees, and the first-ever freestanding hologram device in an airport in partnership with Proto hologram, which shows animals from the Bronx Zoo and has been used to beam in comedian Howie Mandel as a live hologram to surprise passengers.

=== Terminal 5 ===
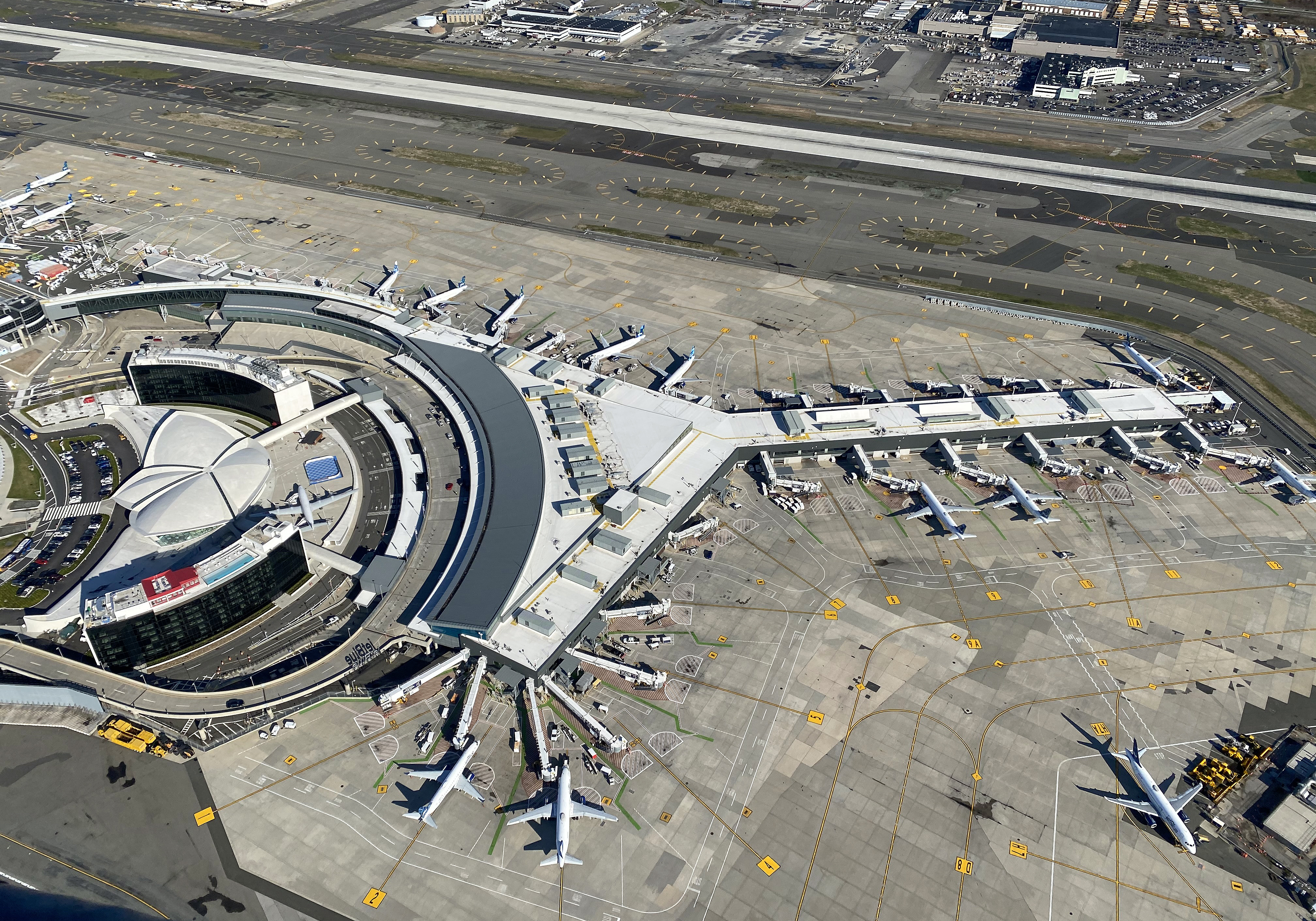
Terminal 5

Terminal 5 (T5) opened in 2008 for JetBlue, the manager and primary tenant of the building, functioning as its operating base at JFK. The terminal is also used by Cape Air and Sun Country Airlines. On November 12, 2014, JetBlue opened the International Arrivals Concourse (T5i) at the terminal.

The terminal was redesigned by Gensler and constructed by Turner Construction, and sits behind the preserved Eero Saarinen-designed terminal originally known as the TWA Flight Center, which is now connected to the new structure and is considered part of Terminal 5. The TWA Flight Center reopened as the TWA Hotel in May 2019. The active Terminal 5 building has 29 gates: 1 through 12 and 14 through 30, with gates 25 through 30 handling international flights that are not pre-cleared (gates 28–30 opened in November 2014).

Aer Lingus opened an airport lounge in 2015. The terminal opened a rooftop lounge open to all passengers in 2015, T5 Rooftop & Wooftop Lounge, a pet relief area, located near Gate 28. In August 2016, Fraport USA was selected by JetBlue as the concessions developer to help attract and manage concessions tenants that align with JetBlue's vision for Terminal 5. During the summer of 2016, JetBlue renovated Terminal 5, completely overhauling the check-in lobby. In addition, a $100 million renovation of T5 was announced in 2025.

When Terminal 5 was announced in 2005, JFK Airport's vice president of redevelopment described the planned structure as "a very practical, very efficient building". T5 was also described as "hyper-efficient" and a "monument to human throughput", and a reviewer for Condé Nast Traveler said in 2020 that T5 "might be the [...] best" terminal at JFK Airport.

=== Terminal 7 ===
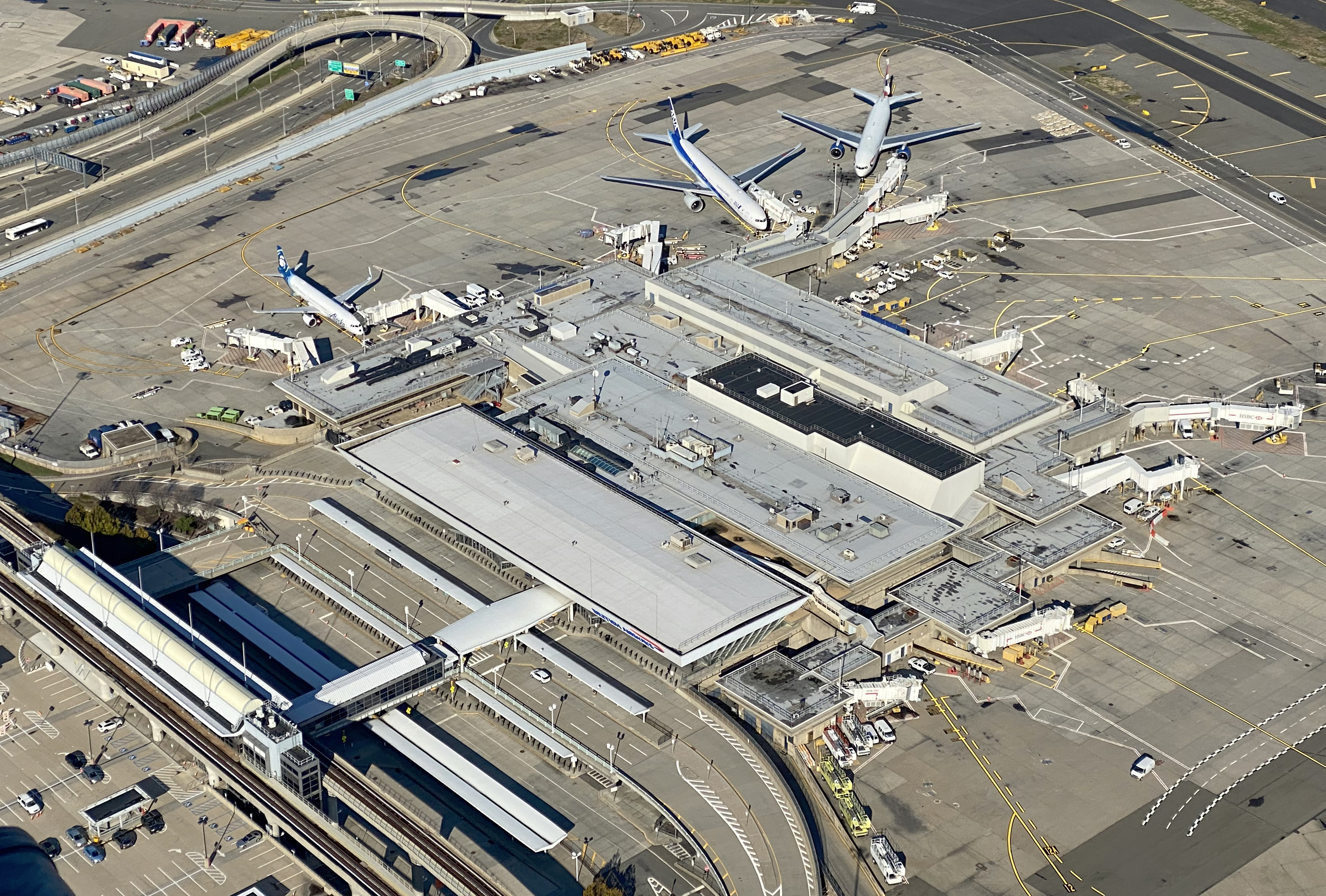
Terminal 7

Terminal 7 was designed by GMW Architects and built for British Overseas Airways Corporation (BOAC) and Air Canada. If opened on June 30, 1970 being inaugaurated by Princess Alexandra of Kent on September 24, 1970. Prior to 2022, the terminal was operated by British Airways, and was also the only airport terminal operated on US soil by a foreign carrier. British Airways operated Concorde here until 2003.

Airlines operating out of Terminal 7 include Star Alliance carriers All Nippon Airways and Ethiopian Airlines; and non-alliance carriers Aer Lingus, Condor, HiSky, Icelandair, Kuwait Airways, and Norse Atlantic Airways.

In 1989, the terminal was renovated and expanded for $120 million. The expansion was designed by William Nicholas Bodouva + Associates, Architects. In 1997, the Port Authority approved British Airways' plans to renovate and expand the terminal. The $250 million project was designed by Corgan Associates and was completed in 2003. The renovated terminal has 12 gates.

In 2015, British Airways extended its lease on the terminal through 2022, with an option of a further three years. BA also planned to spend $65 million to renovate the terminal. Despite being operated by British Airways, a major Airbus A380 operator, Terminal 7 is not able to handle the aircraft type. As a result, British Airways could not operate A380s on the lucrative London Heathrow to New York route, even though in 2014, there was an advertising campaign that British Airways was going to do so. British Airways planned to join its Oneworld partners in Terminal 8, however, and did not exercise its lease options on Terminal 7. The terminal is now operated by JFK Millennium Partners, a consortium including JetBlue, RXR Realty, and Vantage Airport Group, who will eventually demolish the current terminal. At the same time, a new Terminal 6 will begin to be built to serve as a direct replacement.

In late 2020, United Airlines announced they would return to JFK in February 2021 after a 5-year hiatus. As of March 28, 2021, United operated transcontinental nonstop service from Terminal 7 to its west coast hubs in San Francisco and Los Angeles. On October 29, 2022, however, United suspended service to JFK.

On May 29, 2025 United Airlines announced it struck a deal with jetBlue to return to JFK in 2027. Destinations are still being discussed.

=== Terminal 8 ===
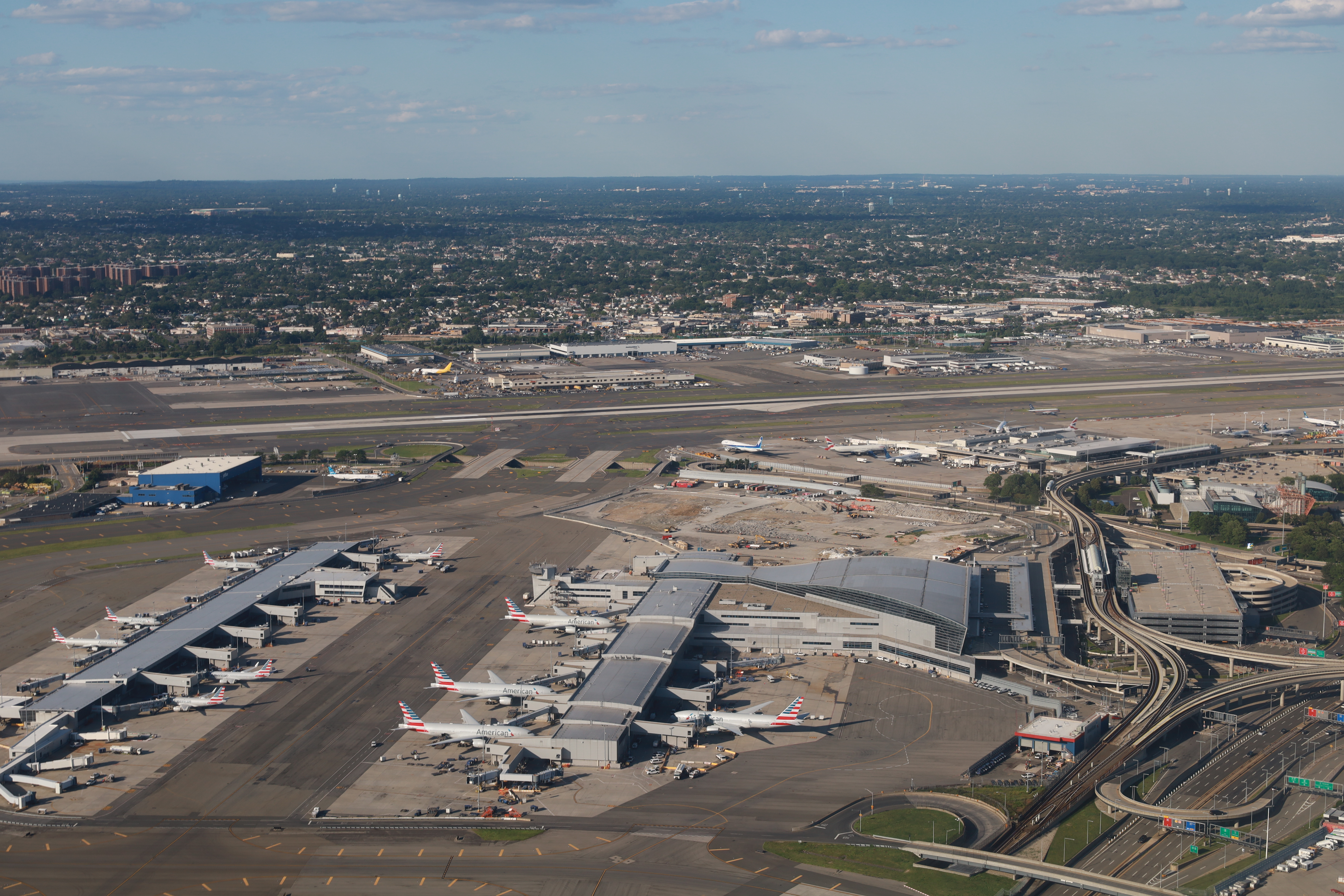
Aerial view of Terminal 8

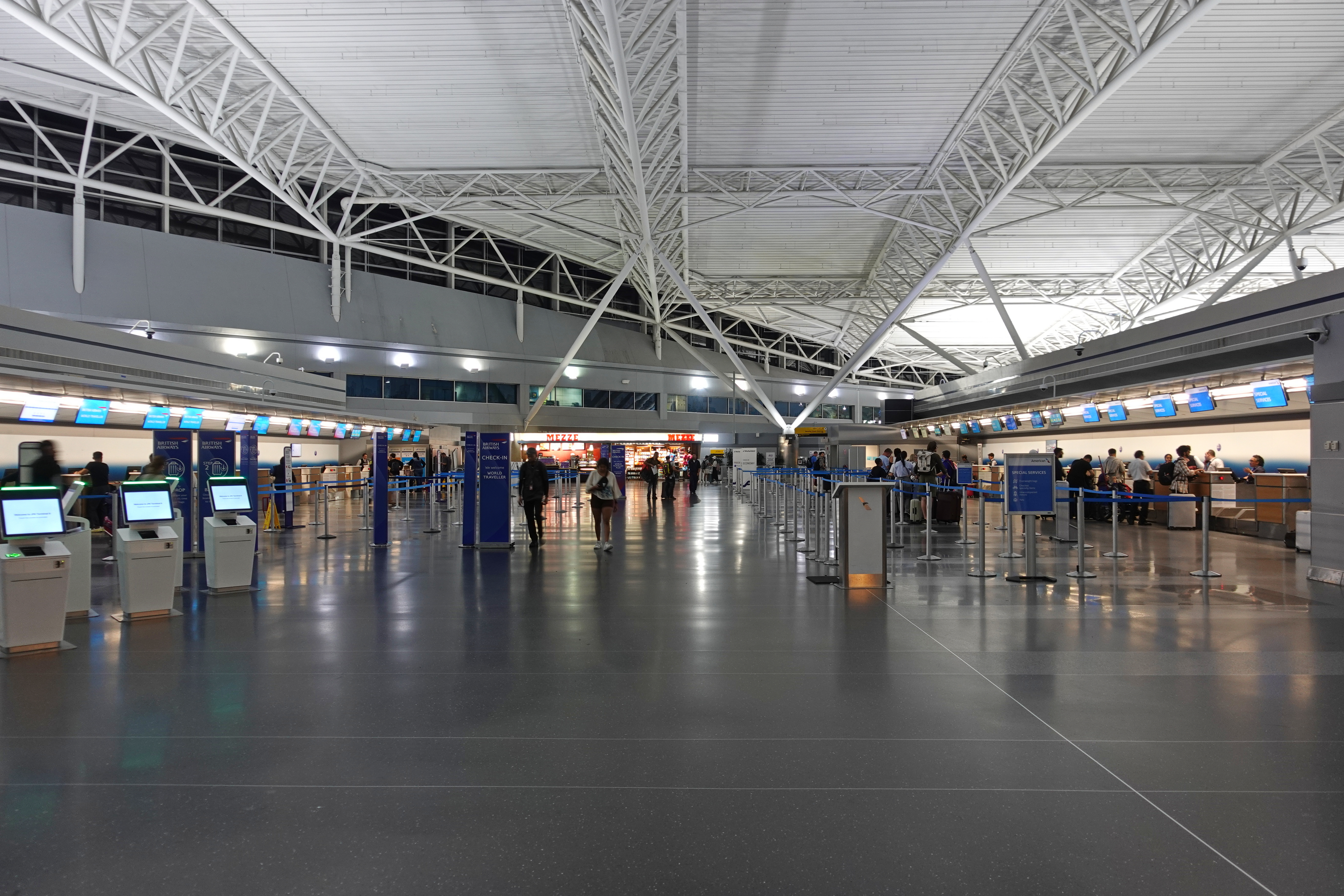
Check-in area of Terminal 8

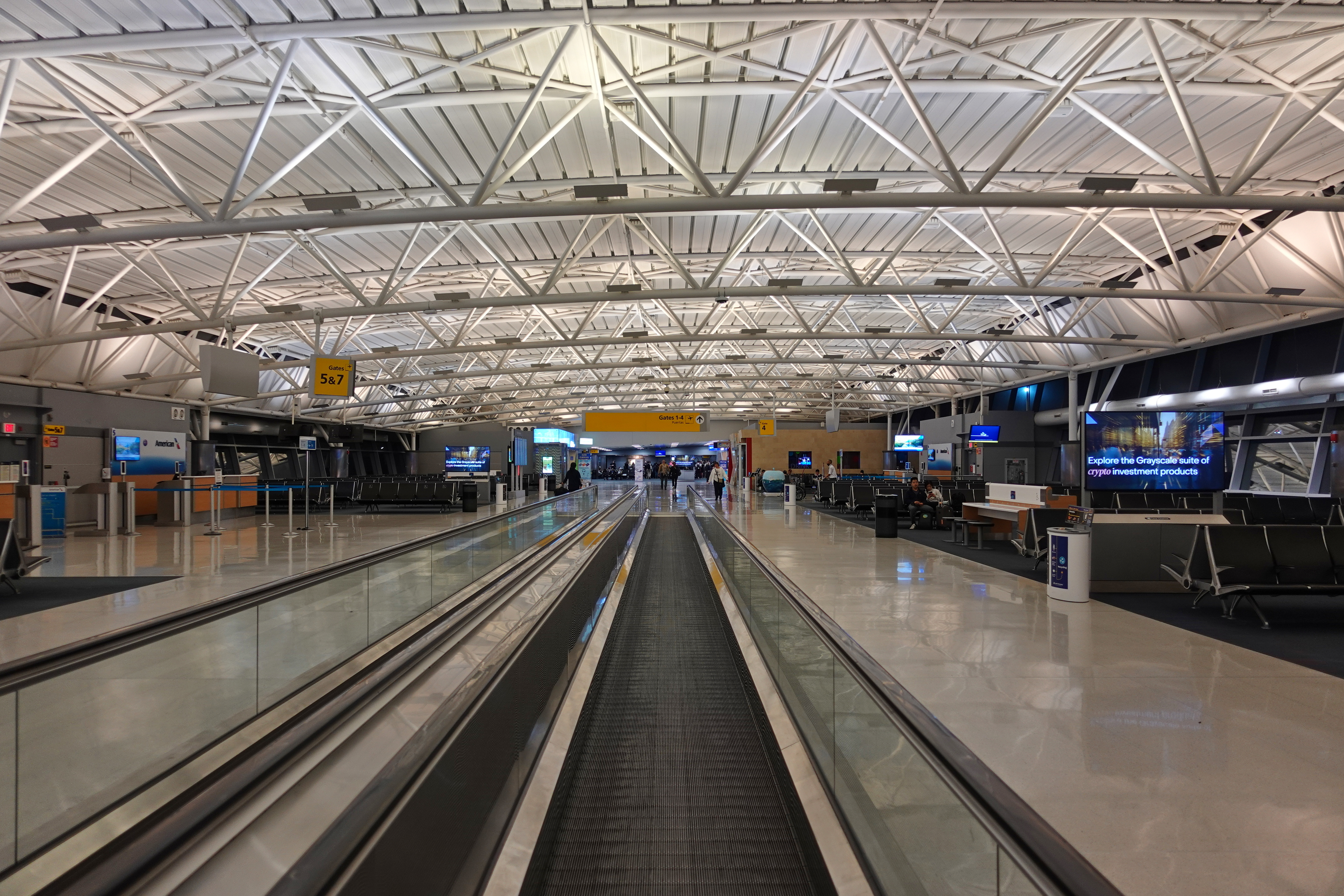
Airside concourse

Terminal 8 is a major Oneworld hub with American Airlines operating its hub here. In 1999, American Airlines began an eight-year program to build the largest passenger terminal at JFK, designed by DMJM Aviation to replace both Terminal 8 and Terminal 9. Originally, the terminal was initially planned to house 59 gates and a "check-in area larger than Giants Stadium". After budget shortfalls, the final plan eventually resulted in a scaled-down terminal with only 36 gates, and a headhouse with half of the originally modeled footprint. The new terminal was built in four phases, which involved the construction of a new midfield concourse and the demolition of old Terminals 8 and 9. It was built in stages between 2005 and its official opening in August 2007. American Airlines, the third-largest carrier at JFK, manages Terminal 8 and is the largest carrier at the terminal. Other Oneworld airlines that operate out of Terminal 8 include Alaska Airlines, British Airways, Cathay Pacific, Finnair, Hawaiian Airlines, Iberia, Japan Airlines, Qantas, Qatar Airways, and Royal Jordanian. Non-alliance carriers China Southern Airlines, GOL, and Israir also use the terminal.

In 2019, it was announced that British Airways and Iberia would move into Terminal 8 preceding the demolition of Terminal 7 and that the terminal would be expanded and changed to accommodate more widebody aircraft that British Airways, Iberia and other Oneworld airlines regularly fly to JFK. On January 7, 2020, construction began expanding and improving Terminal 8 with construction completed in 2022. This construction marked the first phase in the airport's expansion; the terminal had the same number of gates as before, plus four hardstands. British Airways began operating some flights out of Terminal 8 on November 17, 2022, while all flights moved from Terminal 7 on December 1, 2022. Iberia also moved to Terminal 8 on December 1, while Japan Airlines moved to the terminal on May 28, 2023. Hawaiian Airlines began operating from Terminal 8 on April 22, 2025. Alaska Airlines also began operating some flights out of the terminal, while remaining flights moved from Terminal 7 in October 2025.

The terminal is twice the size of Madison Square Garden. It offers dozens of retail and food outlets, 84 ticket counters, 44 self-service kiosks, ten security checkpoint lanes, and a U.S. Customs and Border Protection facility that can process more than 1,600 people per hour. Terminal 8 has an annual capacity of 12.8 million passengers. It has one American Airlines Admirals Club and three lounges for premium class passengers as well as frequent flyers (Greenwich, Soho, and Chelsea lounges).

Terminal 8 has 31 gates: 14 gates in Concourse B (1–8, 10, 12, 14, 16, 18, and 20) and 17 gates in Concourse C (31–47). Passenger access to and from Concourse C is by a tunnel that includes moving walkways.

The terminal features a mural depicting 70 prominent cities, artworks honoring American Airlines, and a mosaic depicting the original terminal building that stood between 1960 and 2008.

=== Reconstruction ===
On January 4, 2017, the office of then-New York governor Andrew Cuomo announced a plan to renovate most of the airport's existing infrastructure for $7 to $10 billion. The Airport Master Plan Advisory Panel had reported that JFK, ranked 59th out of the world's top 100 airports by Skytrax, was expected to experience severe capacity constraints from increased use. The airport was expected to serve about 75 million annual passengers in 2020 and 100 million by 2050, up from 60 million when the report was published. The panel had several recommendations, including enlarging the newer terminals; relocating older terminals; reconfiguring highway ramps and increasing the number of lanes on the Van Wyck Expressway; lengthening AirTrain JFK trainsets or connecting the line to the New York City transportation system, and rebuilding the Jamaica station with direct connections to the Long Island Rail Road and the New York City Subway. No start date was proposed for the project; in July 2017, Cuomo's office began accepting proposals for master plans to renovate the airport. When the construction is finished, the airport will have 149 total gates: 145 with jetways and four hardstands. Notably, previous plans included adding cars to AirTrain trainsets; widening connector ramps between the Van Wyck Expressway and Grand Central Parkway in Kew Gardens; and adding another lane in each direction to the Van Wyck, at a combined cost of $1.5 billion. It is unclear how many, if any, of those proposals are still being considered.

==== New Terminal 1 ====
In October 2018, Cuomo released details of a $13 billion plan to rebuild passenger facilities and approaches to JFK Airport. Two all-new international terminals would be built. One of the terminals, a $7 billion, 2.8-million-square-foot (260-thousand-square-metre), 23-gate structure replacing Terminals 1, 2 and the vacant space of Terminal 3. It will connect to Terminal 4, and it will be financed and built by a partnership between Munich Airport Group, Lufthansa, Air France, Korean Air, and Japan Airlines. Of these 23 gates, all are international gates, 22 are widebody gates (four of which can accommodate an Airbus A380), and one is a narrowbody gate. This would also require reconfiguring portions of the roadway network to accommodate the new terminal.

On December 13, 2021, New York Governor Kathy Hochul gave a further update on the plans to build a new Terminal 1, which in a further developed form would cost $9.5 billion. The new facility is inspired by the new Terminal B at LaGuardia Airport. The new terminal will have New York City-inspired art, similar to Terminal B at LGA. The departures level will have four carousels. The terminal building itself also includes a bowtie-shaped roof supported by 90-foot-tall (27 m), tree-shaped columns, along with a radiant heating system that captures passengers' body heat. The new Terminal 1 began construction on September 8, 2022, and will open in phases with the first 14 gates on its east side along with the departures and arrivals hall scheduled to open in 2026 on the site of the demolished Terminal 2. The current Terminal 1 will then be demolished, and in its place, the next five gates on the west side of the terminal will open in 2028, and the final four gates will open in 2030. An additional extension of the terminal on its west side with a further four gates (with an extra A380 gate) has been proposed in the event of excess traffic.

==== Expanded Terminal 4 ====
On February 11, 2020, Cuomo and the Port Authority, along with Delta Air Lines, announced a $3.8 billion plan to add sixteen domestic, regional gates to the 'A' side of Terminal 4, replacing Terminal 2. The main headhouse would have been expanded to accommodate additional passengers and open in 2022. The airport finished construction on a downsized plan in 2023, allowing the demolition of Terminal 2, the consolidation of flights for Delta, and the ability to build the new Terminal 1. An expanded roadway will be completed in 2025. Delta consolidated their operations into Terminal 4 in January 2023, along with opening 10 new gates in Terminal 4's Concourse A. An additional expansion to Concourse B was expected to be completed by the fall of 2023.

==== New Terminal 6 ====
Construction on a new Terminal 6 began in February 2023, on the site of the original Terminal 6 and Terminal 7. The terminal was designed by Corgan and will have ten gates, nine of which will be wide-body gates. The terminal will be opened in multiple phases; the first phase is expected to be completed by 2026, and as of November 2022, is projected to cost $4.2 billion. The terminal is planned to open in phases from 2026 onward; The full terminal is expected to open in 2028. The new terminal will connect to Terminal 5; Terminal 7 will be demolished after the new Terminal 6's first phase of construction is completed. The construction will be built under a public–private partnership between the Port Authority and a consortium, known as JFK Millennium Partners, comprising JetBlue, RXR Realty, and Vantage Airport Group.

=== Former terminals ===
JFK Airport was originally built with ten terminals, compared to the five it has today. Ten terminals remained until the late 1990s, then nine remained until the early 2000s, followed by eight until 2011, seven until 2013 and six until 2023.

==== Terminal 1 (1959–1995) ====
The original Terminal 1 opened in November 1959, for Eastern Air Lines. It was designed by Chester L. Churchill. Eastern was the primary tenant of this terminal until its collapse on January 19, 1991. Shortly after Eastern's collapse, the terminal became vacant until it was finally demolished in 1995. It was located on the site of today's Terminal 1, which opened in 1998.

==== Terminal 2 (1962–2023) ====
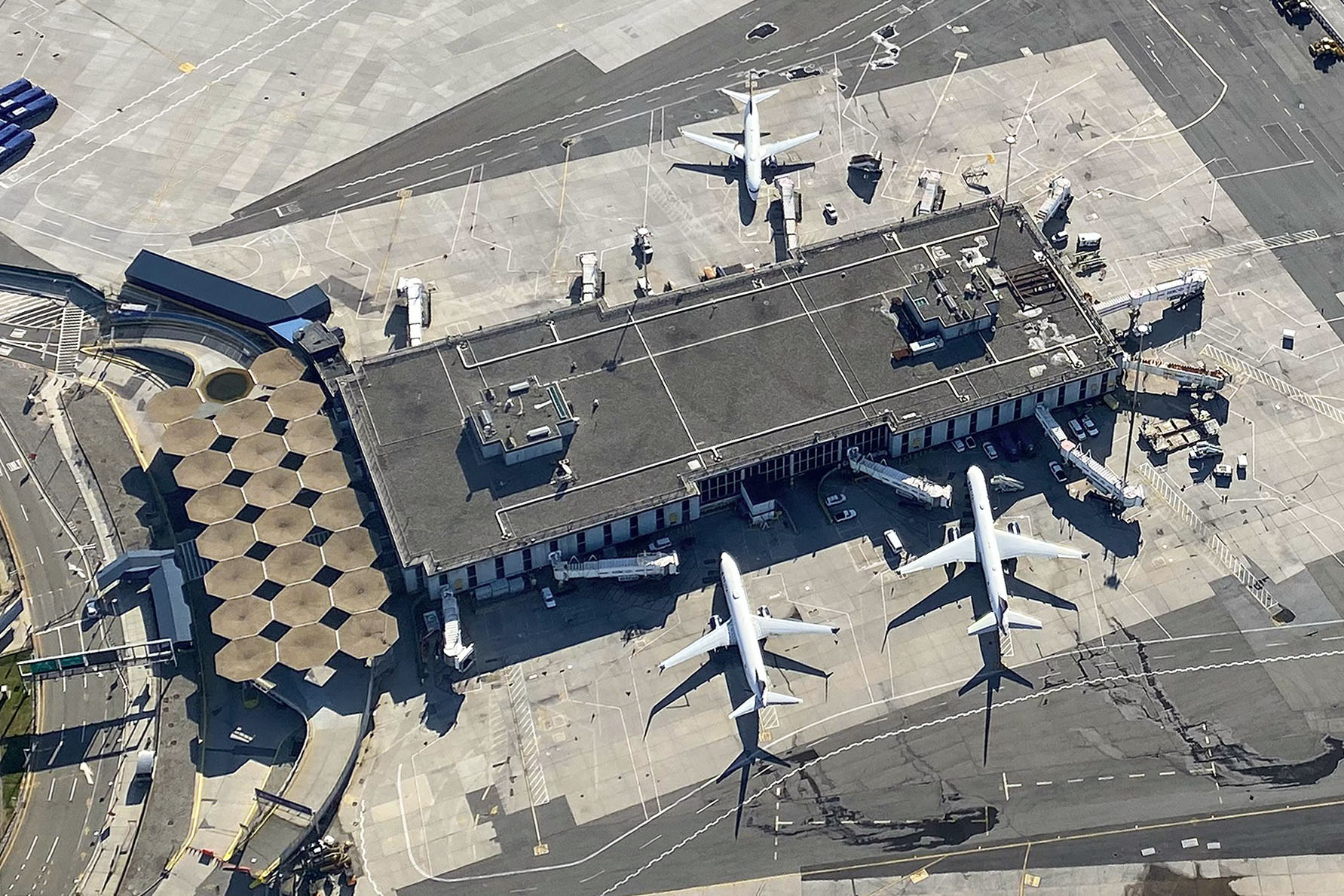
Former Terminal 2

Terminal 2 opened in November 1962 as the home of Northeast Airlines, Braniff International Airways, and Northwest Orient, and was last occupied by Delta Air Lines. The facility contained 11 jetbridge-equipped gates (C60–C70) and one mezzanine-level airline club, and it formerly housed several hardstands for smaller regional airliners. The terminal did not have a U.S. Customs and Border Protection processing facility, and was unable to accept any international flights arriving unless subject to US Customs preclearance. It was designed by the architectural firm White & Mariani.

Delta moved to Terminal 2 following its merger with Northeast Airlines, swapping places with Braniff, and Pan Am moved its domestic flights to this terminal in 1986. Upon the completion of Terminal 4, T2's gates were prefaced with the letter 'C', and airside shuttle buses provided passenger connectivity between the terminals. Before 2013, Terminal 2 hosted most of Delta's operations in conjunction with Terminal 3. Still, the 2013–2015 expansion of Terminal 4 allowed the airline to consolidate most of its operations in the new larger facility, including international and transcontinental flights. In mid-2020, following drastic schedule reductions in the wake of the COVID-19 pandemic, Delta suspended all operations from Terminal 2; the terminal re-opened to flights in July 2021. Terminal 2 permanently closed for departures on January 10, 2023, and for arrivals on January 15, 2023. Terminal 2 was demolished to make room for the new Terminal 1.

==== Terminal 3 (1960–2013) ====
Terminal 3 opened as the Worldport on May 24, 1960, for Pan American World Airways (Pan Am); it expanded after the introduction of the Boeing 747 in 1971. After Pan Am's demise in 1991, Delta Air Lines took over ownership of the terminal and was its only occupant until its closure on May 23, 2013. It had a connector to Terminal 2, Delta's other terminal, used mainly for domestic flights. Terminal 3 had 16 jetway-equipped gates: 1–10, 12, 14–18 with two hardstand gates (Gate 11) and a helipad on taxiway KK.

A $1.2 billion project was completed in 2013, under which Terminal 4 was expanded, and Delta subsequently moved its T3 operations to T4.

On May 23, 2013, the final departure from the terminal, Delta Air Lines Flight 268, a Boeing 747-400 to Tel Aviv Ben Gurion Airport, departed from Gate 6 at 23:25 local time. The terminal ceased operations on May 24, 2013, exactly fifty-three years after its opening. Demolition began soon after that and was completed by summer 2014. The site where Terminal 3 used to stand was used for aircraft parking by Delta Air Lines, but is now occupied by the new Terminal 1.

There has been a major media outcry, particularly in other countries, over the demolition of the Worldport. Several online petitions requesting the restoration of the original 'flying saucer' gained popularity.

==== International Arrivals Building ====
The International Arrivals Building (IAB) was opened in December 1957 and was replaced with the new Terminal 4 in 2001. It was designed by SOM.

==== TWA Flight Center ====
The TWA Flight Center was opened in 1962 and closed in 2001 after its primary tenant, Trans World Airlines, went out of business; the terminal had seen increased capacity issues in the years prior. It was designed by renowned architect Eero Saarinen, with extensions designed by Roche-Dinkeloo opening in 1970.

The TWA Flight Center was named a New York City designated landmark in 1994 and added to the National Register of Historic Places in 2005. It was not demolished after closure; instead, it sat abandoned and was intended to be incorporated into the current JetBlue Terminal 5. It was subsequently converted into the Jet Age-themed TWA Hotel, which opened in 2019.

==== Terminal 6 (1969–2011) ====
Terminal 6 opened as the Sundrome on November 30, 1969, for National Airlines. National was the tenant of this terminal until it was fully acquired by Pan American World Airways (Pan Am) on January 7, 1980. Terminal 6 had 14 gates and was designed by architect I.M. Pei.

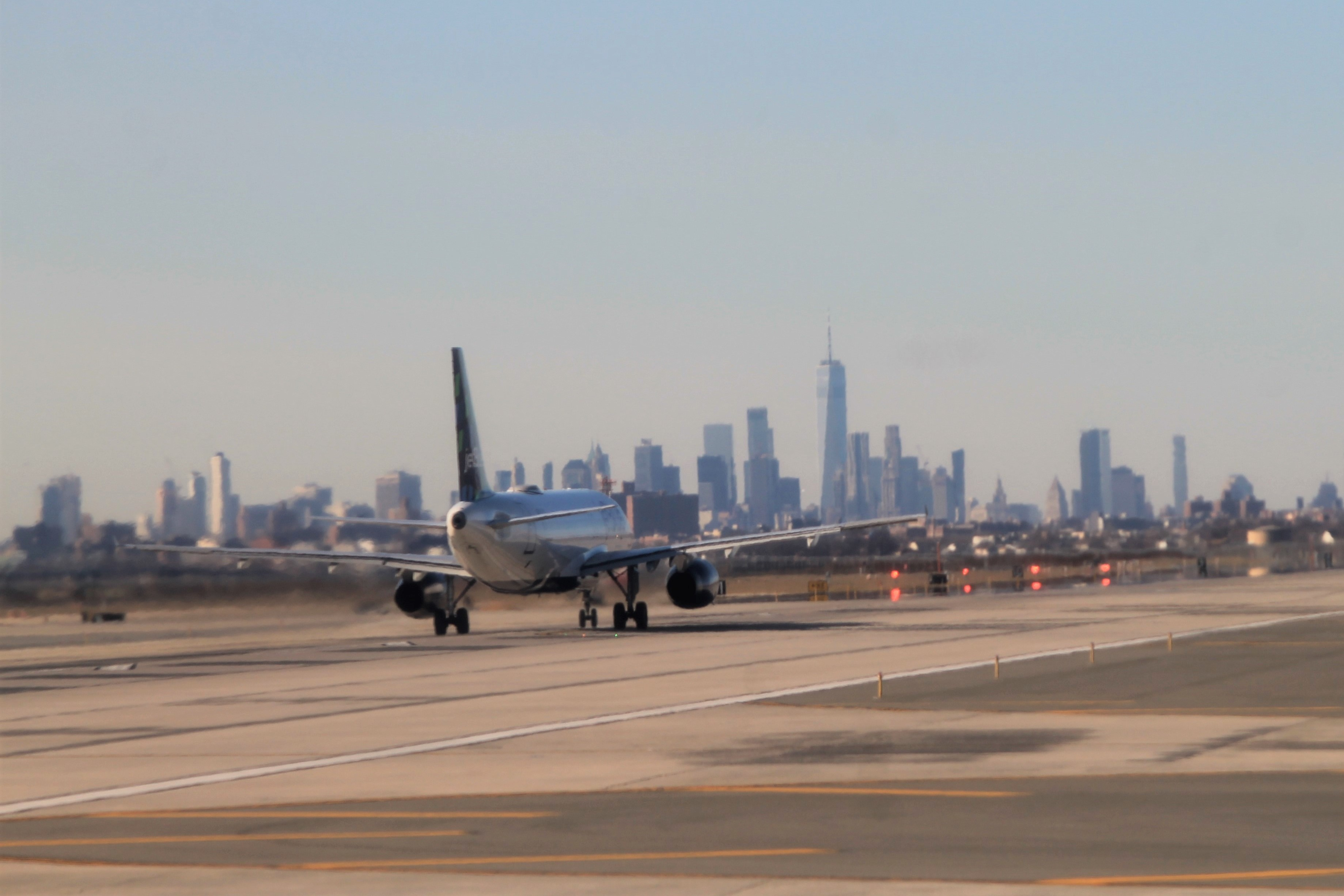
JetBlue flight departing with New York City Skyline visible in the distance

Trans World Airlines (TWA) then expanded into the terminal, referring to it as the TWA Terminal Annex, later called the TWA Domestic Terminal. It was eventually connected to the TWA Flight Center. After TWA reduced flights at JFK, Terminal 6 was used by United Airlines (SFO and LAX transcontinental flights), ATA Airlines, a reincarnated Pan Am II, Carnival Air Lines, Vanguard Airlines, and America West Airlines.

In 2000, JetBlue began service from Terminal 6, later opening a temporary complex in 2006 that increased its capacity by adding seven gates. Until 2008, JetBlue was the tenant of Terminal 6. It became vacant on October 22, 2008, when JetBlue moved to Terminal 5 and was finally demolished in 2011. The international arrivals annex of Terminal 5 now uses a portion of the site, and the rest of the site is used for aircraft parking by JetBlue, but will be occupied by the new Terminal 6, an annex to Terminal 5, planned to be fully opened by 2027.

==== Terminal 8 (1960–2008) ====
The original Terminal 8 opened in February 1960; its stained-glass façade was the largest at the time. It was always used by American Airlines, and, in later years, it was used by other Oneworld airlines that did not use Terminal 7. This terminal, along with Terminal 9, was demolished in 2008 and replaced with the current Terminal 8.

==== Terminal 9 (1959–2008) ====
Terminal 9 opened in October 1959 as the home of United Airlines and Delta Air Lines. Braniff International Airways moved over to Terminal 9 in 1972 after swapping terminals with Delta following Delta's acquisition of Northeast Airlines. It operated out of Terminal 9 until its collapse on May 12, 1982. United used Terminal 9 from its opening in 1959 until it vacated the terminal in 1991 and became a tenant at British Airways' Terminal 7. Northwest Airlines used Terminal 9 from 1986 to 1991. Terminal 9 became the home of American Airlines' domestic operations and American Eagle flights for the remainder of its life. This terminal, along with the original Terminal 8, was demolished in 2008 and replaced with the current Terminal 8.

==== Tower Air terminal ====
The Tower Air terminal, unlike other terminals at JFK Airport, sat outside the Central Terminals area in Building 213 in Cargo Area A. Originally used by Pan Am until the expansion of the Worldport (later Terminal 3), it was later used by Tower Air and TWA shuttle until the airline was acquired by American Airlines in 2001. Building 213 has not been used since 2000.

== Runways and taxiways ==
The airport covers 5,200 acres or 21 square kilometers (8.1 sq mi). Over 25 miles (40 km) of paved taxiways allow aircraft to move around the airfield. The standard width of these taxiways is 75 feet (23 m), with 25 feet (7.6 m) heavy-duty shoulders and 25-foot (7.6 m) erosion control pavement on each side. The taxiways are generally of asphalt concrete composition 15 to 18 inches (380 to 460 mm) thick. Painted markings, lighted signage, and embedded pavement lighting, including runway status lights, provide both position and directional information for taxiing aircraft. There are four runways (two pairs of parallel runways) surrounding the airport's central terminal area.

Number	Length	Width	ILS	Notes
13R/31L	14,511 feet (4,423 m)	200 feet (61 m)	Cat. I (31L)	Third-longest commercial runway in North America (the longest is a 16,000-foot (4,900 m) runway at Denver International Airport, and the second longest is a 14,835-foot (4,522 m) runway at Las Vegas Harry Reid International Airport). Adjacent to Terminal 1. Handled approximately one-half of the airport's scheduled departures. It was a backup runway for Space Shuttle missions. It was closed on March 1, 2010, for four months. The reconstruction of the runway widened it from 150 to 200 feet (46 to 61 m) with a concrete base instead of asphalt. It reopened on June 29, 2010.
13L/31R	10,000 feet (3,048 m)	200 feet (61 m)	Cat. II (13L); Cat. I (31R)	Adjacent to Terminals 5 and 7. Equipped at both ends with ILS and ALS systems. Runway 13L has two additional visual aids for landing aircraft, a Precision Approach Path Indicator (PAPI) and a Lead-In Lighting System (LDIN); the LDIN is colloquially known as the "Canarsie approach", which begins at the Canarsie VOR beacon (CRI). The ILS on 13L, along with TDZ lighting, allows landings down to half a mile's visibility. Takeoffs can be made with a visibility of one-eighth of a mile. It closed on April 1, 2019, for almost eight months as part of a significant runway modernization project that replaced the asphalt base with a concrete floor and widened the runway from 150 to 200 feet (46 to 61 m). It reopened on November 16, 2019.
4R/22L	8,400 feet (2,560 m)	200 feet (61 m)	Cat. III (both directions)	Equipped at both ends with Approach Lighting Systems (ALS) with sequenced flashers and touchdown zone (TDZ) lighting. The first Engineered Materials Arresting System (EMAS) in North America was installed at the northeast end of the runway in 1996. The bed consists of cellular cement material, which can safely decelerate and stop an aircraft that overruns the runway. The arrestor bed concept was originated and developed by the Port Authority and installed at JFK Airport as a joint research and development project with the FAA and industry.
4L/22R	12,079 feet (3,682 m)	200 feet (61 m)	Cat. I (both directions)	Adjacent to Terminals 4 and 5. Both ends allow instrument landings down to three-quarters of a mile's visibility. Takeoffs can be conducted with one-eighth of a mile's visibility. It closed on June 1, 2015, for almost four months as part of a significant runway modernization project that replaced the asphalt base with a concrete base and widened the runway from 150 to 200 feet (46 to 61 m). It reopened on September 28, 2015.

== Facilities and services ==
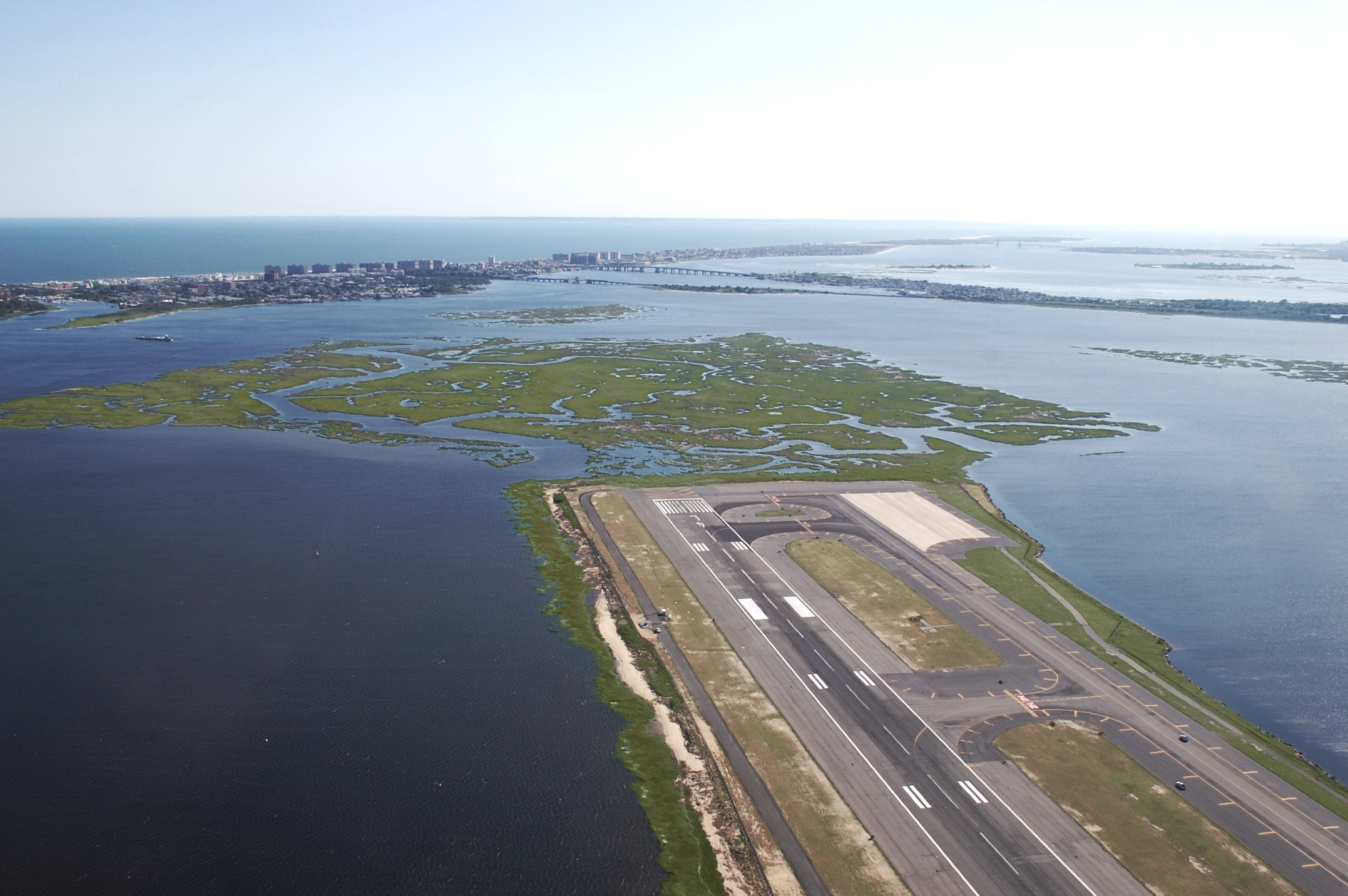
Looking at runway 4L/22R and into Jamaica Bay

=== Air navigation ===
The air traffic control tower, designed by Pei Cobb Freed & Partners and constructed on the ramp-side of Terminal 4, began full FAA operations in October 1994. An Airport Surface Detection Equipment (ASDE) radar unit sits atop the tower. At the time of its completion, the JFK tower, at 320 feet (98 m), was the world's tallest control tower. It was subsequently displaced from that position by towers at other airports in both the United States and overseas, including those at Hartsfield–Jackson Atlanta International Airport, currently the tallest tower at any U.S. airport, at 398 feet (121 m) and at KLIA2 in Kuala Lumpur, Malaysia, currently the world's tallest control tower at 438 feet (134 m).

A VOR-DME station, identified as JFK, is located on the airport property between runways 4R/22L and 4L/22R.

=== Physical plant ===
JFK is supplied with electricity by the Kennedy International Airport Power Plant, owned and operated by Calpine Corporation. The natural gas-fired electric cogeneration facility uses two General Electric LM6000 gas turbine engines to supply a total of 110 megawatts, which is purchased by the Port Authority for airport operations. Excess energy is also sold to the New York Independent System Operator. The 45,000 ft^{2} (4,200 m^{2}) facility was authorized in 1990, designed by RMJM, and first entered commercial service in February 1995.

Heating and cooling for all of JFK's passenger terminals is provided by a co-located Central Heating and Refrigeration Plant (CHRP) in conjunction with a Thermal Distribution System (TDS) that entered service in August 1994. Waste heat from the power plant powers two heat recovery steam generators and a 25-megawatt steam turbine, which in turn run chillers to generate 28,000 tons of refrigeration, or heat exchangers to create 225 million Btu/hour.

=== Aviation ground service ===
Aircraft service facilities include seven aircraft hangars, an engine overhaul building, a 32-million-US-gallon (120,000 m^{3}) aircraft fuel storage facility, and a truck garage. Fixed-base operation service for general aviation flights is provided by Modern Aviation, which possesses the airport's exclusive helipad.

=== Support buildings ===
The airport hosts an extensive array of administrative, government, and air cargo support buildings. In 2002, the New York metropolitan area accounted for 18 percent of import (and over 24 percent of all) air cargo volume in the nation. At that time, JFK itself was reported to have 4.5 million ft^{2} (418,064 m^{2}) of warehouse space with another 434,000 ft^{2} (40,300 m^{2}) under construction.

Building #	Status	Use	Current tenant(s)	Additional information
6	Active	Cargo	FedEx Express	
9	Active	Cargo	Korean Air Cargo	Opened in 2001 on a 188,000 ft^{2} (17,500 m^{2}) site capable of handling three 747 aircraft. The facility was the first at JFK to utilize a computerized automated storage and retrieval system for cargo handling.
14	Active	Admin.	Port Authority	
14	Active	Admin.	JFK Medport	
15	Active	Ground service	Snowlift	
17	Inactive	Hangar		Former Tower Air hangar and office. Later housed artifacts from September 11 attacks, which were distributed to the 9/11 Museum and other memorials.
23	Active	Cargo	Lufthansa Cargo	Previously known as 'Tract 8/9A'. Development of the 434,000 ft^{2} (40,300 m^{2}) site began in August 2001. Currently capable of handling four 747 aircraft. Previous tenants included Alliance Airlines and Cargo Service Center.
23	Active	Cargo	Qantas Freight	Previously known as 'Tract 8/9A'. Development of the 434,000 ft^{2} (40,300 m^{2}) site began in August 2001. Currently capable of handling four 747 aircraft. Previous tenants included Alliance Airlines and Cargo Service Center.
23	Active	Cargo	Swissport USA	Previously known as 'Tract 8/9A'. Development of the 434,000 ft^{2} (40,300 m^{2}) site began in August 2001. Currently capable of handling four 747 aircraft. Previous tenants included Alliance Airlines and Cargo Service Center.
23	Active	Cargo	CAL Cargo Air Lines	Previously known as 'Tract 8/9A'. Development of the 434,000 ft^{2} (40,300 m^{2}) site began in August 2001. Currently capable of handling four 747 aircraft. Previous tenants included Alliance Airlines and Cargo Service Center.
66	Active	Cargo	Nippon Cargo Airlines	
77	Active	Mixed	U.S. Customs and Border Protection	
77	Active	Mixed	Alliance Ground International	
81	Active	Hangar	JetBlue	140,000 ft^{2} (13,000 m^{2}) maintenance facility with 70,000 ft^{2} (6,500 m^{2}) of hangar space. It broke ground in 2003 and opened in 2005 for $45 million.
81A	Active	Hangar	JetBlue	140,000 ft^{2} (13,000 m^{2}) maintenance facility with 70,000 ft^{2} (6,500 m^{2}) of hangar space. It broke ground in 2003 and opened in 2005 for $45 million.
81B	Active	Hangar	JetBlue	140,000 ft^{2} (13,000 m^{2}) maintenance facility with 70,000 ft^{2} (6,500 m^{2}) of hangar space. It broke ground in 2003 and opened in 2005 for $45 million.
86	Active	Cargo	MSN Air Service	
89	Active	Cargo	DHL Global Forwarding	
139	Active	Ground service	LSG Sky Chefs	
141	Active	Mixed	Aviation High School^{1}	Originally housed the Port Authority.^{2} Other tenants included Servisair, the Port Authority Police Department, and North American Airlines.^{1} In 2000, a 5,000 ft^{2} (460 m^{2}) aircraft powerplant lab annex was opened for $800,000 to serve maintenance students.^{2} In 2003, the building was dedicated in honor of PANYNJ employee Morris Sloane.
141	Active	Mixed	ABM Parking	Originally housed the Port Authority.^{2} Other tenants included Servisair, the Port Authority Police Department, and North American Airlines.^{1} In 2000, a 5,000 ft^{2} (460 m^{2}) aircraft powerplant lab annex was opened for $800,000 to serve maintenance students.^{2} In 2003, the building was dedicated in honor of PANYNJ employee Morris Sloane.
145	Active	Ground service	Sheltair	Previously operated by PANYNJ. It became the first privately operated FBO in JFK's history when it was transferred from PANYNJ on May 21, 2012.
151	Active	Cargo	Worldwide Freight Services	
151	Active	Cargo	Swissport	
178	Unknown	Unknown	Unknown	Former Tower Air headquarters
208	Active	Ground service	Aerosnow	Former 400,000 ft^{2} (37,000 m^{2}) Pan Am facility
213	Inactive	Passenger terminal		Former Tower Air terminal
254	Active	Public safety	PAPD	
255	Active	Public safety	PAPD	ARFF training facility equipped with two propane-fueled, computer-controlled aircraft fire simulators.
269	Active	Public safety	PAPD	

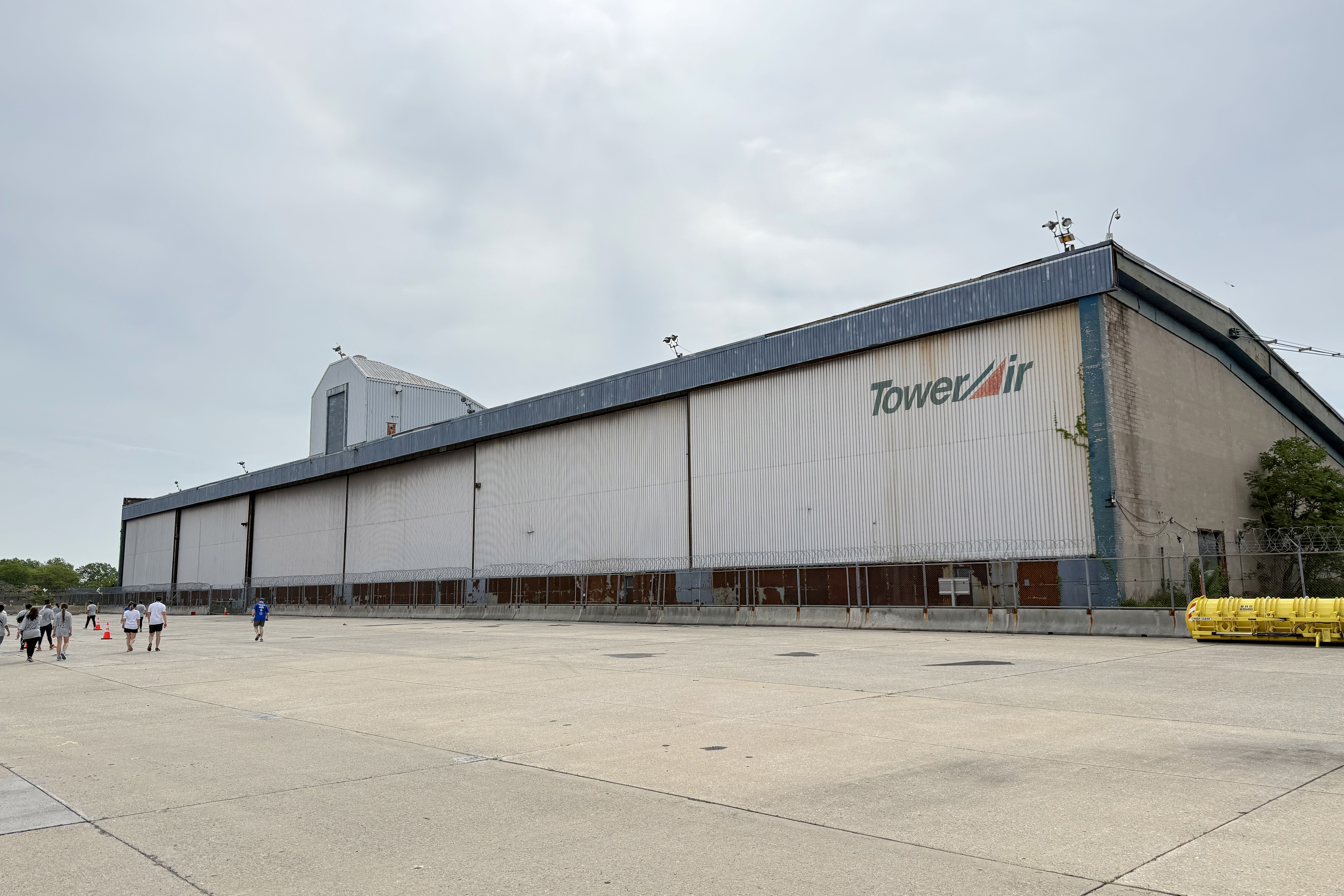
Hangar #17 was used by Port Authority to store 2,500 artifacts from the World Trade Center site after the September 11 attacks.

Three chapels, including Our Lady of the Skies Chapel, provide for the religious needs of airline passengers.

In January 2017, the Ark at JFK Airport, a luxury terminal for pets, opened for $65 million. Ark was built ostensibly so that people who were transporting pets and other animals would be able to provide luxurious accommodations for these animals. At the time, it was supposed to be the only such facility in the U.S. In January 2018, Ark's owner sued the Port Authority for violating a clause that would have given Ark the exclusive rights to inspect all animals who arrive at JFK from other countries. In the lawsuit, the owner stated that Ark had incurred significant operational losses because many animals were instead being transported to a United States Department of Agriculture facility in Newburgh.

=== Airport hotels ===
Several hotels are adjacent to JFK Airport, including the Courtyard by Marriott and the Crowne Plaza. The former Ramada Plaza JFK Hotel is Building 144, and it was formerly the only on-site hotel at JFK Airport. It was previously a part of Forte Hotels and previously the Travelodge New York JFK. Due to its role in housing friends and relatives of aircraft crash victims in the 1990s and 2000s, the hotel became known as the "Heartbreak Hotel". In 2009 the PANYNJ stated in its preliminary 2010 budget that it was closing the hotel due to "declining aviation activity and a need for substantial renovation" and that it expected to save $1 million per month. The hotel closed on December 1, 2009. Almost 200 employees lost their jobs.

On July 27, 2015, Governor Andrew Cuomo announced in a press conference that the TWA Flight Center building would be used by the TWA Hotel, a 505-room hotel with 40,000 square feet (3,700 m^{2}) of conference, event, or meeting space. The new hotel is estimated to have cost $265 million. The hotel has a 10,000-square-foot (930 m^{2}) observation deck with an infinity pool. Groundbreaking for the hotel occurred on December 15, 2016, and it opened on May 15, 2019.

Resorts World New York City is a casino hotel that is located near the airport, adjacent to the Aqueduct Racetrack. The hotel is planning to expand into an integrated resort if granted a full casino license.

=== Law enforcement ===
Law enforcement at John F. Kennedy International Airport is handled primarily by the Port Authority of New York and New Jersey Police Department. In addition to normal uniformed patrol of terminals, concourses, and parking lots, the PAPD provides anti-crime plainclothes units, criminal investigative detective squads, counter-terrorism units, high-value cargo escorts and patrols, dignitary protection, marine patrol of surrounding waters, passenger screening point protection and security, Aircraft Rescue Fire Fighting and community outreach. The PAPD operates alongside partner agencies, including the Transportation Security Administration (TSA), U.S. Customs and Border Protection (CBP), and the New York Police Department.

=== Information services ===
In the immediate vicinity of the airport, parking and other information can be obtained by tuning to a highway advisory radio station at 1630 AM. A second station at 1700 AM provides information on traffic concerns for drivers leaving the airport.

Kennedy Airport, along with the other Port Authority airports (LaGuardia and Newark), uses a uniform style of signage throughout the airport properties. Yellow signs direct passengers to airline gates, ticketing and other flight services; green signs direct passengers to ground transportation services and black signs lead to restrooms, telephones and other passenger amenities. In addition, the Port Authority operates "Welcome Centers" and taxi dispatch booths in each airline terminal, where staff provide customers with information on taxis, limousines, other ground transportation and hotels.

Former New York City traffic reporter Bernie Wagenblast provides the voice for the airport's radio stations and the messages heard on board AirTrain JFK and in its stations.

=== Notable staff ===
Stephen Abraham, colloquially known as Kennedy Steve, was an air traffic controller at JFK between 1994 and 2017. Abraham was known for his distinct "informal" tone and controlling style while handling traffic at the airport. Several of his interactions with pilots were recorded and featured on social media platforms, including YouTube channels. In 2017, Abraham was awarded the Dale Wright Award by the National Air Traffic Controllers Association (NATCA) for distinguished professionalism and exceptional career service to NATCA and the National Airspace System. In 2019, he was hired as Airside Operations and Ramp Manager at JFK's Terminal 1. In 2026, he started a YouTube channel.

== Airlines and destinations ==
=== Passenger ===
Airlines	Destinations
Aer Lingus	Dublin, Shannon
Aeroméxico	Mexico City–Benito Juárez; Seasonal: Guadalajara (begins December 17, 2026), Monterrey
Air China	Beijing–Capital
Air Europa	Madrid
Air France	Paris–Charles de Gaulle
Air India	Delhi–Indira Gandhi, Mumbai–Shivaji
Air New Zealand	Auckland
Air Serbia	Belgrade
Alaska Airlines	Portland (OR), San Diego, San Francisco, Seattle/Tacoma; Seasonal: Anchorage, Palm Springs
All Nippon Airways	Tokyo–Haneda
American Airlines	Amsterdam (begins March 28, 2027), Antigua, Austin, Bermuda, Buenos Aires–Ezeiza, Cancún, Charlotte, Chicago–O'Hare, Dallas/Fort Worth, Delhi–Indira Gandhi, Georgetown–Cheddi Jagan, Las Vegas, London–Heathrow, Los Angeles, Madrid, Mexico City–Benito Juárez, Miami, Milan–Malpensa, Montego Bay, Orange County, Paris–Charles de Gaulle, Phoenix–Sky Harbor, Punta Cana, St. Thomas, San Francisco, São Paulo–Guarulhos, Seattle/Tacoma (resumes April 6, 2027), Tel Aviv (resumes March 29, 2027), Tokyo–Haneda; Seasonal: Athens, Barcelona, Bozeman (begins June 18, 2027), Calgary, Eagle/Vail, Edinburgh, Jackson Hole, Liberia (CR), Nice (begins May 6, 2027), Providenciales, Rio de Janeiro–Galeão, Rome–Fiumicino, St. Kitts, St. Lucia–Hewanorra, Sint Maarten, St. Vincent–Argyle
American Eagle	Boston, Chicago–O'Hare, Cincinnati, Cleveland, Columbus–Glenn, Indianapolis, Nashville, Norfolk, Pittsburgh, Raleigh/Durham, Washington–National; Seasonal: Québec City
Arkia	Tel Aviv
Asiana Airlines	Seoul–Incheon
Austrian Airlines	Vienna
Avianca	Barranquilla (resumes February 2, 2027), Bogotá, Medellín–JMC; Seasonal: Cali, Cartagena, Pereira
Avianca Costa Rica	San José (CR); Seasonal: San Pedro Sula
Avianca Ecuador	Guayaquil, Quito
Avianca El Salvador	Guatemala City, San Salvador
Azores Airlines	Ponta Delgada
British Airways	London–Heathrow
Brussels Airlines	Brussels
Cape Air	Saranac Lake/Lake Placid; Seasonal: Hyannis, Martha's Vineyard, Nantucket
Caribbean Airlines	Georgetown–Cheddi Jagan, Kingston–Norman Manley, Port of Spain, St. Vincent–Argyle, Tobago
Cathay Pacific	Hong Kong
China Airlines	Taipei–Taoyuan
China Eastern Airlines	Shanghai–Pudong
China Southern Airlines	Guangzhou
Condor	Frankfurt
Copa Airlines	Panama City–Tocumen
Delta Air Lines	Accra, Amsterdam, Aruba, Atlanta, Austin, Barcelona, Boston, Cancún, Catania, Dakar–Diass, Dallas/Fort Worth (ends January 4, 2027), Denver, Detroit, Dublin, Edinburgh, Fort Lauderdale, Fort Myers, Frankfurt, Honolulu, Las Vegas, Lisbon, London–Heathrow, Los Angeles, Madrid, Mexico City–Benito Juárez, Miami, Milan–Malpensa, Minneapolis/St. Paul, Montego Bay, Nassau, New Orleans, Orange County, Orlando, Paris–Charles de Gaulle, Phoenix–Sky Harbor, Portland (OR), Porto, Punta Cana, Rome–Fiumicino, Sint Maarten, Salt Lake City, San Antonio, San Diego, San Francisco, San Juan, Santiago de los Caballeros, Santo Domingo–Las Américas, São Paulo–Guarulhos, Seattle/Tacoma, Tampa, Tel Aviv, West Palm Beach, Zurich; Seasonal: Antigua, Athens, Barbados, Berlin, Bozeman, Buenos Aires–Ezeiza, Copenhagen, Eagle/Vail, Grand Cayman, Kingston–Norman Manley, Lagos, Liberia (CR) (resumes December 19, 2026), Malta, Naples, Nice, Olbia, Palm Springs (ends December 19, 2026), Prague, Providenciales, Reykjavík–Keflavík, Rio de Janeiro–Galeão, Sarasota, St. Kitts, St. Thomas, San José del Cabo, Shannon, Stockholm–Arlanda, Venice
Delta Connection	Bangor, Boston, Buffalo, Burlington (VT), Charleston (SC), Charlotte, Chicago–O'Hare, Cincinnati, Cleveland, Columbus–Glenn, Detroit, Indianapolis, Ithaca, Jacksonville (FL), Kansas City, Milwaukee (ends December 18, 2026), Nashville, Norfolk, Pittsburgh, Portland (ME), Raleigh/Durham, Richmond, Rochester (NY), Savannah, Syracuse, Toronto–Pearson, Washington–Dulles (ends February 10, 2027), Washington–National; Seasonal: Martha's Vineyard, Nantucket
EgyptAir	Cairo
El Al	Tel Aviv
Emirates	Dubai–International, Milan–Malpensa
Ethiopian Airlines	Abidjan, Addis Ababa
Etihad Airways	Abu Dhabi
EVA Air	Taipei–Taoyuan
Finnair	Helsinki
Gol Linhas Aéreas	Seasonal: Rio de Janeiro–Galeão
Gulf Air	Bahrain
Hawaiian Airlines	Honolulu
HiSky	Bucharest–Otopeni
Iberia	Madrid
Icelandair	Reykjavík–Keflavík
Israir	Tel Aviv
ITA Airways	Rome–Fiumicino
Japan Airlines	Tokyo–Haneda
JetBlue	Aguadilla, Aruba, Atlanta, Barbados, Boston, Buffalo, Cancún, Cartagena, Charleston (SC), Cleveland, Curaçao, Denver, Detroit, Fort Lauderdale, Fort Myers, Georgetown–Cheddi Jagan, Grand Cayman, Grenada, Guayaquil, Hartford, Houston–Intercontinental, Jacksonville (FL), Kingston–Norman Manley, Las Vegas, Liberia (CR), London–Heathrow, Los Angeles, Montego Bay, Nassau, New Orleans, Orlando, Paris–Charles de Gaulle, Phoenix–Sky Harbor, Pittsburgh, Port-au-Prince (suspended), Port of Spain, Providence, Providenciales, Puerto Plata, Punta Cana, Raleigh/Durham, Rochester (NY), St. Kitts, St. Lucia–Hewanorra, Sint Maarten, St. Vincent–Argyle, Salt Lake City, San Diego, San Francisco, San José (CR), San José del Cabo, San Juan, Santiago de los Caballeros, Santo Domingo–Las Américas, Sarasota, Savannah, Syracuse, Tampa, Vancouver, Washington–National, West Palm Beach; Seasonal: Albuquerque, Bermuda, Bozeman, Burbank, Destin/Fort Walton Beach, Dublin, Edinburgh, Hyannis, Martha's Vineyard, Nantucket, Ontario, Portland (ME), Reno/Tahoe, Sacramento, Seattle/Tacoma
Kenya Airways	Nairobi–Jomo Kenyatta
KLM	Amsterdam
Korean Air	Seoul–Incheon
Kuwait Airways	Kuwait City
LATAM Brasil	São Paulo–Guarulhos
LATAM Chile	Santiago de Chile
LATAM Ecuador	Guayaquil
LATAM Perú	Lima
Level	Barcelona
LOT Polish Airlines	Warsaw–Chopin
Lufthansa	Frankfurt, Munich
Norse Atlantic Airways	Seasonal: Athens, London–Gatwick, Rome–Fiumicino
Philippine Airlines	Manila
Qanot Sharq	Tashkent
Qantas	Auckland, Sydney–Kingsford Smith
Qatar Airways	Doha
Royal Air Maroc	Casablanca
Royal Jordanian	Amman–Queen Alia
Saudia	Jeddah, Riyadh
Scandinavian Airlines	Copenhagen; Seasonal: Oslo
Singapore Airlines	Frankfurt, Singapore
Sun Country Airlines	Seasonal: Minneapolis/St. Paul
Sunrise Airways	Cap-Haïtien
Swiss International Air Lines	Geneva, Zurich
TAP Air Portugal	Lisbon
Turkish Airlines	Istanbul
Uzbekistan Airways	Tashkent
Virgin Atlantic	London–Heathrow, Manchester (UK)
Viva	Mexico City–Benito Juárez; Seasonal: Monterrey
WestJet	Calgary
XiamenAir	Fuzhou

=== Cargo ===
When ranked by the value of shipments passing through it, JFK is the number three freight gateway in the United States (after the Port of Los Angeles and the Port of New York and New Jersey), and the number one international air freight gateway in the United States. Almost 21% of all U.S. international air freight by value and 9.6% by tonnage moved through JFK in 2008.

The JFK air cargo complex is a Foreign Trade Zone, which legally lies outside the customs area of the United States. JFK is a major hub for air cargo between the United States and Europe. London, Brussels and Frankfurt are JFK's three top trade routes. The European airports are mostly a link in a global supply chain, however. The top destination markets for cargo flying out of JFK in 2003 were Tokyo, Seoul and London. Similarly, the top origin markets for imports at JFK were Seoul, Hong Kong, Taipei and London.

20 cargo airlines operate out of JFK, among them: Air ACT, Air China Cargo, ABX Air, Asiana Cargo, Atlas Air, CAL Cargo Air Lines, Cargolux, Cathay Cargo, China Airlines, EVA Air Cargo, Emirates SkyCargo, Nippon Cargo Airlines, FedEx Express, DHL Aviation, Kalitta Air, Korean Air Cargo, Lufthansa Cargo, UPS Airlines, Southern Air, National Airlines, Icelandair Cargo, and, formerly, World Airways. Top 5 carriers together transported 33.1% of all revenue freight in 2005: American Airlines (10.9% of the total), FedEx Express (8.8%), Lufthansa Cargo (5.2%), Korean Air Cargo (4.9%), and China Airlines (3.8%).

There are also some on-demand cargo charter services to JFK, operated by carriers such as Silk Way West Airlines.

Most cargo and maintenance facilities at JFK are located north and west of the main terminal area. DHL, FedEx Express, Japan Airlines, Lufthansa, Nippon Cargo Airlines and United Airlines have cargo facilities at JFK. In 2000, Korean Air Cargo opened a new $102 million cargo terminal at JFK with total floor area of 81,124 square feet (7,536.7 m^{2}) and capability of handling 200,000 tons annually. In 2007, American Airlines opened a new priority parcel service facility at their Terminal 8, featuring 30-minute drop-offs and pick-ups for priority parcel shipments within the US.

Airlines	Destinations
Aerologic	Frankfurt
Air China Cargo	Anchorage, Shanghai–Pudong
AirZeta	Anchorage, Seoul–Incheon
Amazon Air	Cincinnati, Fort Worth/Alliance
ASL Airlines Belgium	Liège
Atlas Air	Anchorage, Chicago–O'Hare, Halifax, Hangzhou, Los Angeles, Quito
Avianca Cargo	San Salvador
Cargolux	Chicago–O'Hare, Guadalajara, Houston–Intercontinental, Indianapolis, Los Angeles, Luxembourg, Mexico City–Felipe Ángeles, Toulouse
Cathay Cargo	Anchorage, Chicago–O'Hare, Hong Kong, Toronto–Pearson
Challenge Airlines	Liège, Tel Aviv
China Airlines Cargo	Anchorage, Taipei–Taoyuan
China Cargo Airlines	Seattle/Tacoma, Shanghai–Pudong
China Southern Cargo	Anchorage, Guangzhou
DHL Aviation	Anchorage, Chicago–O'Hare, Cincinnati, East Midlands, Leipzig/Halle
Emirates SkyCargo	Chicago–O'Hare, Dubai–Al Maktoum, Maastricht/Aachen
EVA Air Cargo	Anchorage, Taipei–Taoyuan
FedEx Express	Indianapolis, Memphis
Kalitta Air	Amsterdam
Korean Air Cargo	Anchorage, Miami, Seoul–Incheon, Shanghai–Pudong, Toronto–Pearson
MNG Airlines	Istanbul, Liège, Toronto–Pearson
Nippon Cargo Airlines	Anchorage, Chicago–O'Hare, Tokyo–Narita
Qantas Freight	Anchorage, Chongqing, Shanghai–Pudong
Qatar Airways Cargo	Doha, Halifax, Zaragoza
Saudia Cargo	Jeddah
SF Airlines	Anchorage, Ezhou, Hangzhou, Shenzhen
Silk Way West Airlines	Baku
Turkish Cargo	Bogota, Istanbul, Toronto–Pearson, Zaragoza
UPS Airlines	Chicago/Rockford, Louisville, Philadelphia; Seasonal: Hartford, Ontario

== Statistics ==
=== Passenger numbers ===
Annual passenger statistics
Year	Passengers
2009	45,877,942
2010	46,515,060
2011	47,643,477
2012	49,273,824
2013	50,451,822
2014	53,220,426
2015	56,884,730
2016	59,103,472
2017	59,488,982
2018	61,636,235
2019	62,571,463
2020	16,630,642
2021	30,788,322
2022	55,287,711
2023	62,464,331
2024	63,265,972
2025	62,629,455

=== Top domestic destinations ===
Busiest domestic routes from JFK (September 2025 – August 2026)
Rank	Airport	Passengers	Carriers
1	Los Angeles, California	1,509,895	American, Delta, JetBlue
2	San Francisco, California	955,663	Alaska, American, Delta, JetBlue
3	Orlando, Florida	703,067	Delta, JetBlue
4	Miami, Florida	653,294	American, Delta, JetBlue
5	Atlanta, Georgia	620,437	Delta, Frontier, JetBlue
6	San Juan, Puerto Rico	560,587	Delta, Frontier, JetBlue
7	Las Vegas, Nevada	547,719	Delta, Frontier, JetBlue
8	Fort Lauderdale, Florida	531,293	Delta, JetBlue
9	Phoenix–Sky Harbor, Arizona	446,602	American, Delta, JetBlue
10	Seattle/Tacoma, Washington	443,713	Alaska, Delta, JetBlue

=== Top international destinations ===
Busiest international routes from JFK (September 2025 – August 2026)
Rank	Airport	Passengers	Carriers
1	London–Heathrow, United Kingdom	2,929,740	American, British Airways, Delta, JetBlue, Virgin Atlantic
2	Paris–Charles de Gaulle, France	1,623,593	Air France, American, Delta, JetBlue, Norse Atlantic
3	Santiago De Los Caballeros, Dominican Republic	1,028,222	Delta, JetBlue
4	Rome–Fiumicino, Italy	947,749	Delta, ITA, Norse, American Airlines
5	Santo Domingo-Las Américas, Dominican Republic	920,979	Delta, Jetblue
6	Madrid, Spain	788,050	Air Europa, American, Delta, Iberia
7	Amsterdam, Netherlands	732,324	Delta, JetBlue, KLM
8	Tokyo–Haneda, Japan	711,312	All Nippon Airways, American, Japan Airlines
9	Punta Cana, Dominican Republic	646,683	American, Delta, Jetblue
10	Cancún, Mexico	638,684	American, Delta, Jetblue

=== Airline market share ===
Carrier shares (September 2025 – August 2026)
1. Delta, 18,144,452 (30.6%)
2. JetBlue, 13,863,585 (23.4%)
3. American, 7,466,961 (12.6%)
4. Alaska, 1,235,523 (2.10%)
5. British Airways, 1,207,185 (2.00%)
6. Other carriers, 17,300,000 (29.2%)

Largest airlines at JFK (September 2025 – August 2026)
Rank	Airline	Passengers	Share
1	Delta Air Lines	18,144,452	30.6%
2	JetBlue	13,863,585	23.4%
3	American Airlines	7,466,961	12.6%
4	Alaska Airlines	1,235,523	2.1%
5	British Airways	1,207,185	2.0%
6	Other airlines	17,300,000	29.2%

== See also ==
- List of memorials to John F. Kennedy
- List of accidents and incidents at John F. Kennedy International Airport
- Christopher O. Ward
- List of tallest air traffic control towers in the United States
