= Richard S. McCoy =

- Born: Hillsdale, Michigan, United States
- Occupations: Executive Director of Landmark Columbus Foundation, curator, conservator-restorer, writer
- Spouse: Tracey Gallion
- Children: 3

Richard McCoy, born and raised in the Midwest, is an American arts administrator, curator, and former conservator-restorer, who is the founding executive director of Landmark Columbus Foundation.

== Early life and education ==
McCoy grew up in Indiana. He received a B.A. in political science and journalism from Indiana University Bloomington. He was a Fulbright Scholar to Spain. McCoy also received an M.A. in art history and an advance certificate in conservation-restoration from the New York University Institute of Fine Arts.

== Career ==
McCoy began his career in art conservation and curatorial roles in prominent institutions, including the Lilly Library at Indiana University and the Metropolitan Museum of Art and The Museum of Modern Art in New York City.

=== Indianapolis ===
He served as Conservator of Objects & Variable Art at the Indianapolis Museum of Art from 2003 to 2013. During this time, he also taught as an adjunct faculty instructor at IUPUI and Johns Hopkins University. He collaborated with internationally recognized curators and artists on several exhibitions and projects. Additionally, he completed numerous conservation treatments on iconic works at the museum and curated the exhibition "Indiana: By the Numbers" which focused on the artist Robert Indiana's work from the 1980s. During this tenure, the museum received the prestigious Ross Merrill Award, among other distinctions.

Highlights of McCoy's projects at IMA:

- Conservation of Time-Based Art: McCoy worked on innovative conservation strategies for time-based media and digital art, emphasizing the importance of collaboration between artists and conservators to maintain the integrity of artworks over time.
- Jean Tinguely’s "Chaos 1": McCoy oversaw the conservation and return of this kinetic sculpture, ensuring its functionality and aesthetic integrity.
- Interview with Robert Irwin: McCoy conducted an in-depth interview with artist Robert Irwin about his installation "Light and Space III" for the IMA’s atrium, discussing the challenges and intricacies of conserving large-scale contemporary art.
- Hands-Off Approach to Controlling Media-Based Artworks: He co-authored a paper on the implementation of a computerized control system for electronic media components in contemporary art installations, which enhanced efficiency and reduced gallery downtime.
- Documenting public art with a community-based approach, including all of Tony Smith's outdoor sculptures.

=== Columbus, Indiana ===
In 2013, he began working for the Columbus, Indiana redevelopment commission to create a plan and process to care for the world-renowned cultural heritage. In 2014, McCoy became the Founding Executive Director of Landmark Columbus Foundation, a non-profit dedicated to preserving and advancing the cultural heritage of Columbus, Indiana. The organization runs three primary programs: Exhibit Columbus, the Columbus Design Institute, and Progressive Preservation projects.

Highlights of McCoy's projects in Columbus:

- Founded Landmark Columbus Foundation and has grown it significantly, gaining recognition for its progressive preservation and community engagement efforts.
- Launched the foundation's signature program, Exhibit Columbus, which explores community, architecture, art, and design. The program celebrates Columbus's modernist legacy and creates an innovative cycle of events, fostering innovative ideas and site-responsive installations.
- Led significant preservation projects at National Historic Landmark resources such as First Christian Church and North Christian Church.
- Received a $3.4m grant in collaboration with Heritage Fund to support the foundation's work through 2025.
- Launched an endowment for the organization with a goal of $3m by the end of 2025 and many major gifts already received.
