= J. Irwin and Xenia S. Miller Prize =

Art and Design prize for site-specific public installations in Columbus, Indiana

- Awarded for: Site-specific public installations advancing architecture, landscape, art, and design
- Country: United States
- Presented by: Exhibit Columbus (Landmark Columbus Foundation)
- First award: 2016 (first awards installed 2017)
- Most recent recipients: Adaptive Operations; AD—WO; Studio Barnes; Studio Cooke John (2025)
- Website: https://www.exhibitcolumbus.org

The J. Irwin and Xenia S. Miller Prize is an art and design award administered by Exhibit Columbus of the Landmark Columbus Foundation in Columbus, Indiana. The prize commissions four to five architecture and design teams each cycle to create temporary, site-specific public installations paired with significant civic sites and local partners. Established in 2016 and named for philanthropists J. Irwin and Xenia S. Miller, the prize foregrounds community engagement, design research, and the city's modernist legacy.

As of 2025, twenty-three teams have received the Miller Prize across five cycles (2017, 2019, 2021, 2023, 2025).

== Selection and format ==
Each cycle's curatorial partners select four or five recipients and pair them with a civic site and local organization. Teams develop and fabricate full-scale installations, which are exhibited alongside university fellows’ projects and community initiatives during the Exhibit Columbus exhibition season.

== Recipients ==
=== 2016-17 – Inaugural ===
- IKD — Conversation Plinth (Cleo Rogers Memorial Library plaza).
- Studio:indigenous — Wiikiaami (First Christian Church).
- Plan B Architecture & Urbanism — Anything Can Happen in the Woods (Cummins Corporate Office Building).
- Oyler Wu Collaborative — The Exchange (Irwin Conference Center).
- Aranda\Lasch — Another Circle (Mill Race Park).

=== 2018-19 – Good Design and the Community ===
- Agency Landscape + Planning — XX (AT&T Switching Center).
- Bryony Roberts Studio — Soft Civic (Columbus City Hall).
- Frida Escobedo Studio — Untitled (Cleo Rogers Memorial Library plaza).
- MASS Design Group — Corn/Meal (Central Middle School).
- SO–IL — Into the Hedge (Bartholomew County Courthouse Lawn).

=== 2020-21 – New Middles ===
- Dream the Combine — Columbus Columbia Colombo Colón (Mill Race Park).
- Ecosistema Urbano — Cloudroom (Central Middle School).
- Future Firm — Midnight Palace (Sears Building Plaza).
- Olalekan Jeyifous — Archival/Revival (Cleo Rogers Memorial Library plaza).
- Sam Jacob Studio — Alternative Instruments (Washington Street).

=== 2022-23 – Public by Design ===
- Tatiana Bilbao ESTUDIO — Designed by the Public (Cleo Rogers Memorial Library plaza).
- Practice for Architecture and Urbanism (PAU) — InterOculus (4th and Washington Streets).
- PORT — The Plot Project (Mill Race Center).
- Studio Zewde — Echoes of the Hill (Mill Race Park).

=== 2024-25 – Yes And ===
- Adaptive Operations — Accessing Nostalgia (Crump Theatre).
- AD—WO — Ellipsis (former Irwin Block site).
- Studio Barnes — Joy Riding (Jackson Street Parking Garage).
- Studio Cooke John — Lift (First Christian Church courtyard).

== See also ==
- Driehaus Architecture Prize
- List of architecture awards
- List of prizes known as the Nobel of a field or the highest honors of a field
- Exhibit Columbus
- Columbus, Indiana
