= Landmark Columbus Foundation =

- Founded: 2015
- Founder: Heritage Fund–The Community Foundation of Bartholomew County
- Type: Nonprofit organization
- Purpose: To care for, celebrate, and advance the cultural heritage of Columbus, Indiana and like‑minded communities
- Headquarters: Columbus, Indiana, U.S.
- Location: Columbus, Indiana
- Region served: United States
- Key people: Tracy Haddad (Board Chair); Richard McCoy (Executive Director); Jamie Goldsborough (Creative Director)
- Website: www.landmarkcolumbusfoundation.org

Landmark Columbus Foundation (LCF) is a nonprofit organization based in Columbus, Indiana, United States. It works to care for, celebrate and advance the cultural heritage of Columbus and like-minded communities. Created in 2015 under the Heritage Fund of Bartholomew County, LCF became an independent 501(c)(3) organization in late 2019. Its most visible program is Exhibit Columbus, an exploration of community, architecture, art and design; through this program the foundation administers the J. Irwin and Xenia S. Miller Prize and operates Progressive Preservation and other initiatives.

== History ==
Columbus, Indiana, became known for modernist architecture in the mid‑20th century when local patron J. Irwin Miller sponsored buildings by architects such as Eero Saarinen and I. M. Pei. In 2015, concerned about sustaining this legacy, the Heritage Fund created Landmark Columbus as a program focusing on preservation and public engagement. Richard McCoy was appointed founding director and promoted the concept of Progressive Preservation that balances conservation with contemporary use.

=== Exhibit Columbus and early projects ===
The foundation's first major initiative was Exhibit Columbus, a two‑year program alternating between symposium and exhibition years. A symposium in September 2016 titled "Foundations and Futures" introduced the J. Irwin and Xenia S. Miller Prize competition and set the stage for future exhibitions. The inaugural exhibition opened in August 2017 with 18 temporary, site‑specific installations across downtown Columbus, and subsequent cycles have been held in 2019, 2021, 2023 and 2025.

In 2019, the foundation and the Heritage Fund received a grant from the Getty Foundation's "Keeping It Modern" program to create conservation plans for the North Christian Church. The organization has advocated for the preservation of Eliel Saarinen's First Christian Church, Otter Creek Clubhouse, and other modernist landmarks. In March 2025, the foundation introduced a Progressive Preservation Planning Grant to study the revitalization of the Otter Creek Clubhouse designed by architect Harry Weese.

=== Independent nonprofit ===
In late 2019, Landmark Columbus became an independent 501(c)(3) organization and adopted the name Landmark Columbus Foundation. Cause IQ, a nonprofit data service, lists its program areas as Exhibit Columbus, Progressive Preservation and the Columbus Design Institute. Philanthropic support has included a $100,000 donation in 2025 from the Tracy L. Haddad Foundation toward LCF's endowment campaign.

=== Exhibit Columbus ===
Exhibit Columbus is a program consisting of a symposium, design presentations, and a citywide exhibition of temporary installations. Each two-year cycle commissions site‑specific projects by Miller Prize recipients, University Design Research Fellows and community teams, pairing designers with civic sites such as I. M. Pei's Cleo Rogers Memorial Library and Eliel Saarinen's First Christian Church. The program includes tours, talks and educational activities, such as a design camp for elementary‑school students hosted with the Foundation For Youth. Exhibit Columbus has been celebrated for reviving Columbus's tradition of civic design and fostering partnerships between designers and local agencies.

==== J. Irwin and Xenia S. Miller Prize ====
The J. Irwin and Xenia S. Miller Prize commissions four or five architecture and design teams each cycle to create temporary public installations. Established in 2016, the prize is named for Columbus philanthropists J. Irwin and Xenia S. Miller and emphasizes community engagement. By 2025, twenty‑three teams had received the prize, including IKD, studio:indigenous, SO–IL, Bryony Roberts Studio, MASS Design Group, Dream the Combine, Studio Zewde, Adaptive Operations, AD—WO, Studio Barnes and Studio Cooke John.

=== Progressive Preservation ===
LCF describes "Progressive Preservation" as an approach that encourages the adaptive reuse of historic sites and active community participation. The foundation has applied this model in conservation planning for the North Christian Church and in initiatives such as a planning grant for the Otter Creek Clubhouse. A 2024 announcement by the AIA New York's Center for Architecture credited LCF with advancing a "design renaissance" in Columbus through Progressive Preservation and noted that its efforts have attracted national support.

== Publications ==
=== American Modern ===
In 2024, Landmark Columbus Foundation collaborated with the Monacelli imprint of Phaidon Press to publish American Modern: Architecture; Community; Columbus, Indiana, written by architecture critic Matt Shaw, illustrated with photographs by Iwan Baan, and designed by Studio Lin. It is the first in‑depth monograph on Columbus' design history; the 472‑page volume traces how civic, industrial and social forces converged over several generations to transform the small Midwestern city into a "laboratory of architectural modernism". The book profiles buildings and landscapes by architects from Eero Saarinen and I. M. Pei to Deborah Berke and IwamotoScott Architecture and includes essays by Shaw about the city's "generations‑long quest to develop the ideal American city through design excellence."

American Modern was released in the summer of 2024 and has attracted attention from design media. Wallpaper* magazine described it as a "dynamic and thorough monograph" that sheds fresh light on Columbus' status as "one of the country's most prominent modernist projects", noting that Shaw's research and Baan's photography document both mid‑century landmarks and contemporary additions. The Architect's Newspaper said the book "chronicles how Columbus became the testing bed for modern architecture" and invites readers to experience the city's history as if they were residents, emphasizing the book's mix of archival material and images of daily life. Writing for Untapped journal, critic Ian Volner called the volume "almost certainly the most thorough monographic treatment of the town's history to date" and highlighted Shaw's aim to show how quality architecture can provide "a blueprint … for creating that sense of connectivity that can only be grounded in authentic places and experiences." Volner also observed that the book situates Columbus' modernist achievements within a collective effort by many civic leaders and architects.

== Reception and impact ==
National and international design media have highlighted Landmark Columbus Foundation's role in reviving Columbus' modernist legacy. The Architect's Newspaper wrote in 2023 that Exhibit Columbus "raises the bar" for design expositions and builds partnerships with local institutions.

- Dwell magazine described LCF as carrying the torch for Columbus's architectural heritage and emphasized its community‑focused mission.
- Public radio outlet WFYI reported that the 2025 "Yes And" exhibition drew record crowds and offered free events.
- Local outlets such as The Republic Newspaper, Local News Digital, Bridge FM, and 106.1 The River have documented LCF's design camps, book releases, and grant programs, illustrating its community impact.

== Governance and finances ==
Landmark Columbus Foundation is governed by a board of directors and led by executive director Richard McCoy. According to Cause IQ, the foundation reports revenues and expenses annually and funds its programs through grants, donations and earned income. The AIA New York's Center for Architecture notes that the foundation's progressive preservation work has garnered support from across the United States.

== See also ==
- Modern architecture
