= Irwin Conference Center =

Bank and office in Columbus, Indiana, US

- Irwin Union Bank and Trust
- U.S. National Register of Historic Places
- U.S. National Historic Landmark
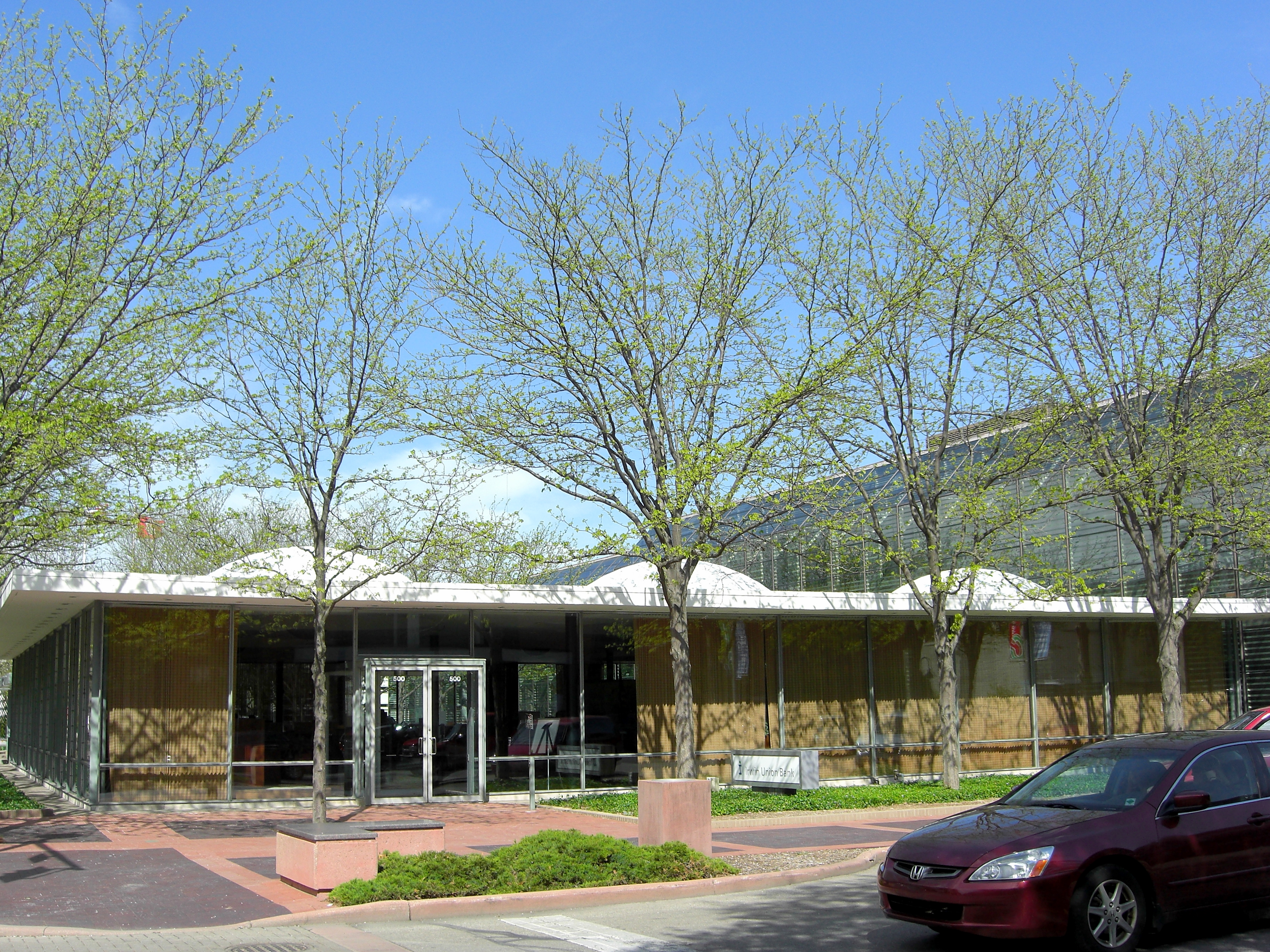
- Exterior view in 2009

- Location within Bartholomew County, Indiana Location within Indiana Location within the United States
- Location: 500 Washington Street; Columbus, Indiana, United States
- Coordinates: 39°12′13″N 85°55′17″W
- Built: 1953–1955 (original building); 1970–1973 (expansion)
- Architect: Eero Saarinen (original building); Kevin Roche (expansion); John Dinkeloo (expansion); Dan Kiley (landscape)
- Architectural style: Modern
- MPS: Modernism in Architecture, Landscape Architecture, Design, and Art in Bartholomew County, 1942–1965 MPS
- NRHP reference No.: 00000704

Significant dates
- Added to NRHP: May 16, 2000
- Designated NHL: May 16, 2000

The Irwin Conference Center (also known as the Irwin Office Building and Conference Center; formerly known as the Irwin Union Bank Building) is a commercial building at 500 Washington Street, on the northwest corner of Washington and Fifth streets, in Columbus, Indiana, United States. The modern-styled building was constructed as the Irwin Union Bank's downtown Columbus branch. Eero Saarinen designed the one-story main building and the original three-story office wing in the early 1950s. His associates Kevin Roche and John Dinkeloo of the firm Roche-Dinkeloo were responsible for a three-story office annex in the 1970s, along with a drive-through facility on the grounds. The landscape architect Dan Kiley added a lawn and trees. The building has received critical acclaim for its design over the years, and it was designated as a National Historic Landmark in 2000 for its architectural significance.

The main building, at the street corner, has a square floor plan with a glass facade and a concrete roof with nine shallow domes. The original office wing, north of the banking hall, is set back behind another building and has a brick-and-concrete facade and windows. A steel-and-glass arcade leads westward to the annex, which is made of similar materials. Inside, the first floor of the main building is an open plan space with tellers' counters, a conference area, and furniture. A staircase descends to a basement that originally included a kitchen, dining area, vaults, and offices. The office wing and annex contain additional offices.

The idea for the bank came from J. Irwin Miller, the president of the Irwin Union Trust Company (later the Irwin Union Bank) and a major architectural patron. He commissioned Saarinen to design a new building for the bank in 1950, and Irwin Union Trust acquired the site the next year. Although construction began in 1953, most work did not take place until the following year. The building opened on March 10, 1955. The design helped increase business at the Irwin Union Bank, and the bank decided to expand the building in 1970; the annex was completed in 1973. The bank acquired further properties nearby in the late 1980s and early 2000s. Due to the 2008 financial crisis, the Irwin Union Bank went into receivership in 2009. Afterward, the building was acquired by the First Financial Bank, which sold it the next year to the conglomerate Cummins. The bank building operated as a conference center and office building until 2020; it has been closed since.

== Site ==
The Irwin Union Bank Building (also the Irwin Office Building and Conference Center) is located at 500 Washington Street in Columbus, a city in Bartholomew County, Indiana, United States. It is set back from the northwest corner of Fifth and Washington streets, which, at the time of the bank's construction, was the town's busiest intersection. Adjoining the Irwin Union Bank Building are commercial buildings, which rise two or three stories. The Irwin Union Bank Building's previous headquarters, a limestone building, was across the street. The Irwin Conference Center is one of several contemporary-style buildings on Fifth Street in downtown Columbus, along with the Cummins Corporate Office Building, Cleo Rogers Memorial Library, and First Christian Church. It is also close to other structures such as The Republic Newspaper Office and Columbus City Hall.

=== Landscape ===
As built, the bank building occupied only one-third of the site. The rear or western portion houses a drive-through window and a large parking lot with trees. When the bank building was erected, the Irwin Union Bank did not own the entire site, and part of what is now the parking lot was occupied by another structure. Dan Kiley, the bank building's landscape architect, selected specific types of trees and foliage to provide shade and integrate the building into the streetscape. He used littleleaf linden trees as the basis of the space, with euonymus as ground cover and seasonal spring bulbs, begonias, geraniums, and chrysanthemums as accents. Kiley also added an underground sprinkler system to irrigate the plants. These plantings created a park-like feeling, as the Irwin Union Bank Building is shorter than the structures around it.

The main bank building is set back 12 feet (3.7 m) from the sidewalk. Trees are also placed around the bank building, which, according to the Architectural Forum, was intended to attract passersby. Originally, there were 27 sweet gum trees surrounding the main building, each measuring 18 feet (5.5 m) tall. The trees stand near the sidewalk, helping to integrate the building into the streetscape, since the adjacent buildings are not recessed from the sidewalk. The original trees were saplings; they were intended to obscure the neighboring buildings as they grew, thereby reinforcing the building's park-like feeling. West of the building, the trees are planted in three rows spaced 20 feet (6.1 m) apart; some of the original linden trees have been replaced with honey locusts. There is also a lawn west of the original bank, surrounded by honey locusts.

The original plans included an early iteration of a drive-through teller's window, located west of the main building, with a driveway and parking lot for customers who did not want to go inside. A driveway, dating from 1966, travels between the trees and splits into multiple lanes divided by brick and concrete median strips. The driveway is paved in concrete aggregate with brick-paved borders, and there are steel and aluminum bollards illuminating the driveway. Within the driveway are three standalone bank teller booths, also added in the 1966 renovation; they have canopies designed in the 1980s by Frank Adams, a local architect. When the building was constructed, there were radiant heating coils embedded into the outdoor concrete slabs.

== Architecture ==
The Irwin Office Building and Conference Center was designed in two phases. The original one-story bank and a small three-story office wing were designed by Eero Saarinen in 1954. The office wing conceals the irregular northern boundary of the lot, where a former railroad's right-of-way cuts diagonally across the lot's northeast corner. Although the railroad had stopped running by World War II, Saarinen's building occupies part of the line's right-of-way, and an adjacent alleyway follows the railroad's path. To the west of the main building and office wing is a three-story office annex added in 1973 by Kevin Roche and John Dinkeloo, both of Roche-Dinkeloo (a successor firm to Saarinen's practice). The Roche-Dinkeloo annex extends westward through the block. The writer Matt Shaw stated that the design combined the clean lines of Miesian buildings and the welcoming atmosphere of modernist buildings at the Cranbrook Academy of Art, where Saarinen had studied.

The Irwin Union Bank Building is one of seven buildings in Columbus designated National Historic Landmarks. The others are The Republic Newspaper Office, the Mabel McDowell Adult Education Center, the Miller House, the North Christian Church, the First Christian Church, and the First Baptist Church. Of these buildings, the Irwin Conference Center is one of three designed by Saarinen, the others being the Miller House and North Christian Church; all three buildings were commissioned by the local businessman J. Irwin Miller. The bank building is also one of several modernist public buildings that Miller commissioned in the town, and, along with a 1952 cottage in Canada, one of four buildings that Saarinen designed for Miller. The annex is also one of several Roche-Dinkeloo designs in Columbus, along with the city's post office and visitor center, as well as Cummins Inc. facilities such as the Cummins Corporate Office Building.

=== Exterior ===
==== Main building ====
The main bank building is one story high and has a square floor plan measuring 88 feet (27 m) on each side. All four elevations of the facade are divided vertically into 12 bays of glazed panels with steel frames. On each elevation, the lowest 4 inches (100 mm) of the facade consists of Indiana limestone, while above it are 8-foot-wide (2.4 m) windows that extend to the roof. Each bay has a horizontal steel mullion bar, dividing it into two panes; the lower pane measures 2 feet (0.61 m) high, and the upper pane spans most of the bay's height. The facade's steel framework is made of mullions measuring 1/4 inch (6.4 mm) thick, which protrude from the glass panes. Each corner of the building consists of two protruding, perpendicular mullions, creating a hollow corner on the outside. The glass-walled design was intended to contrast both with traditional banks' facades and with the office wing to the north. The trees around the building provided shade for the glass walls.

The western elevation has drive-through tellers' windows; there are two, each with bulletproof glass, though their function was later supplanted by three standalone booths. The building is accessed from a heated vestibule at the southern end of the eastern elevation, which leads to Washington Street. The main building's northern elevation has a pair of glass-and-steel passageways leading to the southern side of the office wing, which lead west into an arcade in the 1973 annex. Sweet gum trees were originally planted in the courtyard between the two passageways. The tellers' windows, entrance, and passageways have similar glazing to the rest of the facade, but are about 8 feet (2.4 m) high.

The building has a concrete roof clad in standing seam metal. The roof's 12-inch (300 mm) thick concrete slab is 12 feet (3.7 m) above ground level. At the perimeter of the roof, eaves extend 4.5 feet (1.4 m) beyond the facade; the eaves are angled downward, doubling as a coping. Within the roof are nine small domes, each of which is a thin-shell concrete vault. The domes divide the interior into a 3×3 grid of square bays. They were intended to give a sculptural quality to the roof, which is otherwise flat, and they also served to reduce the dead load of the roof, making it lighter. In addition, the domes allowed rainwater to flow off the roof.

==== Office wing and annex ====
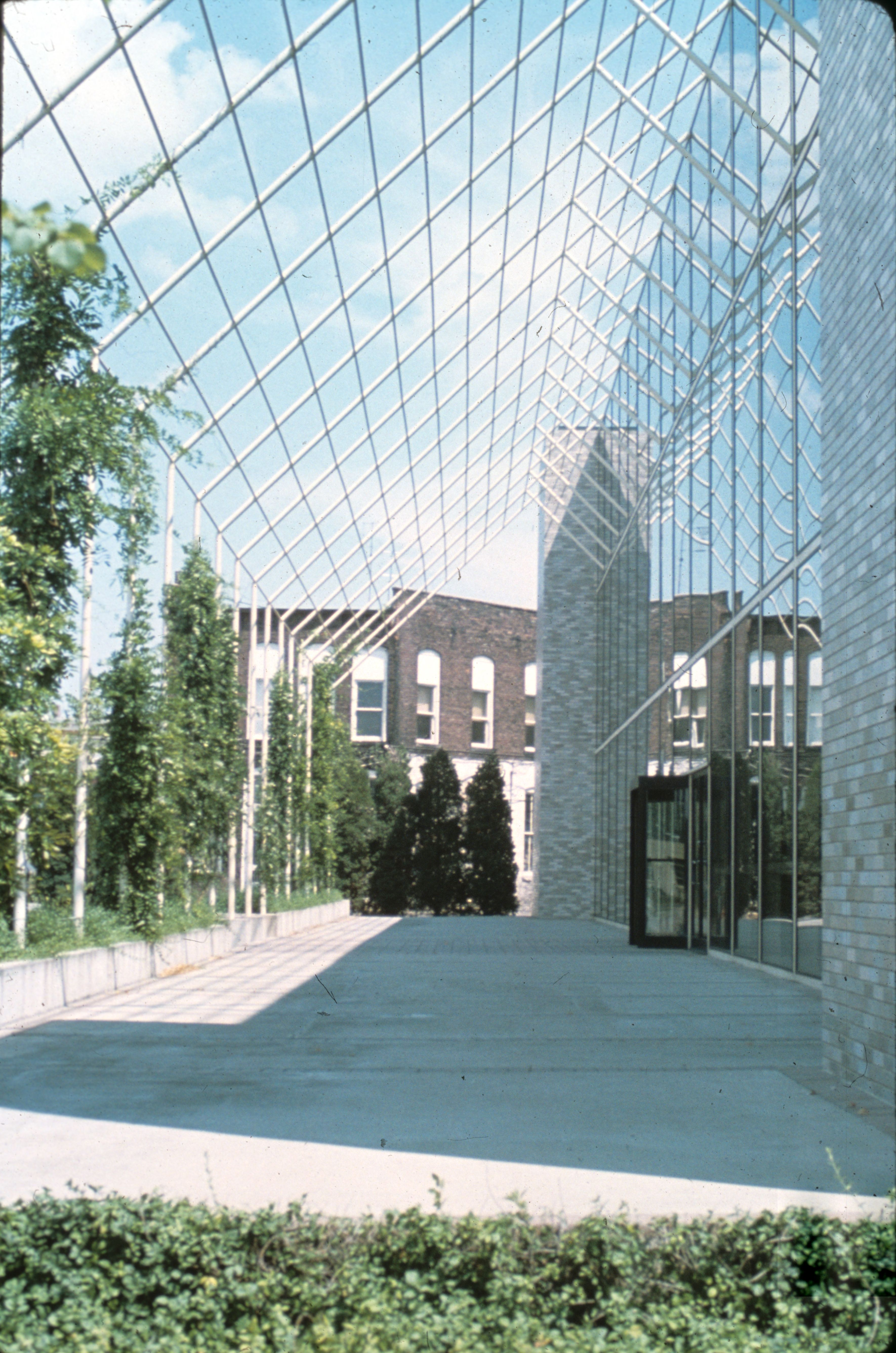
The arcade of Irwin Union Bank's annex in 1977

The original office wing is set back behind another building on Washington Street. The office wing largely measures 104 feet (32 m) east–west and 34 feet (10 m) north–south; due to the presence of the alleyway at the northeastern corner, the eastern elevation narrows to 18 feet (5.5 m). It appears as a separate structure, since it shares no common materials or shapes with the main building. The office wing's south elevation has a glazed-brick facade with several openings; the northern elevation is made of concrete block with steel-framed windows embedded into it. The other two elevations are attached to other buildings: the northeastern and eastern elevations are party walls shared with the Washington Street building, and the western elevation is shared with Roche's later annex.

Roche's annex is connected to the original wing via an arcade, which has brown-brick floor pavers. The annex is three stories high and uses similar materials to the original office wing. The western and eastern elevations have masonry walls. On the northern elevation is a 50-foot-long (15 m), steel-and-glass frame that includes air-conditioning ducts. The steel-and-glass frame encloses a patio running the building's length. A similar frame encloses the arcade on the southern elevation, although this frame has alternating bands of reflective and clear glass strips; the upper part of the arcade's frame slopes down at an angle. On both the northern and southern elevations, the steel strips function as mullions. Dan Kiley oversaw the landscape design for the arcade, adding tropical plants such as bougainvillea.

=== Interior ===
The building has a total of 90,794 sq ft (8,435.0 m^{2}) of space. The one-story main bank building has a banking hall for public functions, which is mostly an uninterrupted, open-plan space. Private offices were largely relegated to the office wing and annex. A basement extends underneath both the banking hall and the original office wing. The banking hall has a forced-air heating system; the rest of the original building is heated and cooled by boilers and three chillers. Pneumatic tubes allowed items to be sent between bookkeepers' offices and tellers' counters. The building also had telephone dictation machines, a first in Indiana. An elevator and spiral stair led between the tellers' counters and the basement. After becoming a conference center in the 2010s, the banking hall became an atrium, and the rest of the building became open-plan offices.

==== Banking hall ====
From the outset, Saarinen's design for the banking hall was intended to make it seem welcoming and friendly. The floors are made of buff-brick pavers in a basket-weave pattern, which are covered with carpets in some places. The banking floor itself was placed at ground level to increase accessibility. The windows have full-height bamboo drapes. The ceiling measures 11 ft 6 in (3.51 m) high, interspersed with nine domes. The ceiling domes each measure 18 feet (5.5 m) across and are clad with acoustic material, in contrast to the rest of the ceiling, which is covered in plaster. The domes act similarly to lampshades, with uplights mounted in the middle of each dome. There are a total of 364 recessed lamps in the ceiling. Circular steel columns, measuring 8 inches (200 mm) thick, denote the corners of each bay. The design was intended to make the banking hall inviting even to factory workers with dirty overalls or farmers with muddy boots.

The banking hall was originally decorated in shades of blue-gray, yellow, and brown, interspersed with cane and walnut paneling. There were also red planters, or flower boxes. To avoid the need for "Closed" signs, which Saarinen found unwelcoming, he originally installed removable plastic hoods on the tellers' counters. There were initially 14 hoods, each of which measured 13 inches (330 mm) high and could be removed whenever a teller was on duty. For the most part, the interior of the banking hall was originally furnished with furniture manufactured by Herman Miller and Knoll, Inc. The desks and planters were designed by George Nelson, while Saarinen designed other objects such as the tellers' counters and upholstered fiberglass-and-steel chairs. All of the desks and chairs had an identical design. In the 2000s, the building largely retained its original furnishings, which had been modified slightly. The building's original artworks included Alexander Girard's collection of Eastern European textiles.

Floor plan

As built, a display area was placed at the southeast corner of the banking hall, adjoining the main entrance. The bank's more private divisions, such as the special service and loan departments, were placed in the rear, behind the tellers' partitions in the front. The center bay of the banking hall's northern elevation has an 8-foot-tall (2.4 m) conference area, with a walnut partition facing south toward the stairs, greenish-gray cabinets and cupboards on the other walls, and a wire glass ceiling. This area is divided into three walnut-paneled workspaces or conference rooms. These offices were placed in the main building because J. Irwin Miller wanted the bank's executives to interact with the customers.

==== Other spaces ====
In the middle of the banking hall, south of the conference area, is a staircase descending to the basement, where the bank's non-public departments were housed. The stair has walnut railings, stainless-steel balusters, and oak treads suspended from the ceiling, and there are no risers between treads. The design of the staircase is similar to those in some buildings that Saarinen also designed at the General Motors Technical Center in Michigan. The bottom landing of the staircase has a lobby leading to the employee dining room (which had dining tables and lockers), and an employee lounge. Also in the basement were a kitchen, directors' office, and bookkeeping rooms. The basement had a steel-and-concrete vault, as well as a concrete room for nighttime deposits, which had a conveyor belt leading to the street.

The original office wing has concrete floors and a concrete frame. The office wing's basement had mechanical equipment and storage space. The ground floor had Irwin Union Trust's trust-and-investment department, the second floor had a bookkeeping department, and the top story was originally used for storage. These floors are connected by an elevator, as well as a staircase at the eastern end. Within the annex, each story is carried on exposed trusses that run across the building from north to south. The center of the annex has open-plan offices; there are service and mechanical areas at either end. These service areas contain conference rooms, as well as stairs, closets, and restrooms. The annex has 16,000 square feet (1,500 m^{2}) of space underground and 28,000 square feet (2,600 m^{2}) above ground.

== History ==
The building was commissioned for the Irwin Union Trust Company, formed in 1928 when Irwin's Bank acquired the Union Trust Company. Irwin's Bank, in turn, had been founded in 1871 as a safe deposit box at Joseph I. Irwin's dry-goods store. The store, originally located at the corner of Third and Washington streets in downtown Columbus, relocated two blocks away to the northeast corner of Fifth and Washington streets in 1881. The banking division, which originally occupied one corner of the Fifth Street location, had expanded to cover the whole store by 1907. The bank remained at that location until 1947, when J. Irwin Miller became president of the Irwin Union Trust Company after the death of his father, the bank's previous president. At the time, Miller was an influential businessman who led the Cummins Engine Company and owned several buildings in Columbus.

By the early 1950s, Irwin Union Trust's existing building was overcrowded; deposits at the Irwin Union Trust had grown 900 percent over the past two decades, and a proposal to expand the old building had been deemed infeasible. Miller consequently contacted the modernist architect Eero Saarinen in 1949 about the possibility of designing a new building for the bank. The two men had known each other since 1939, when Saarinen's father Eliel had been hired to design the First Christian Church in the same city. Eero Saarinen was Miller's favorite architect, and Saarinen likewise regarded Miller as "the perfect client", ultimately designing four buildings for him.

=== Development ===
==== Planning ====
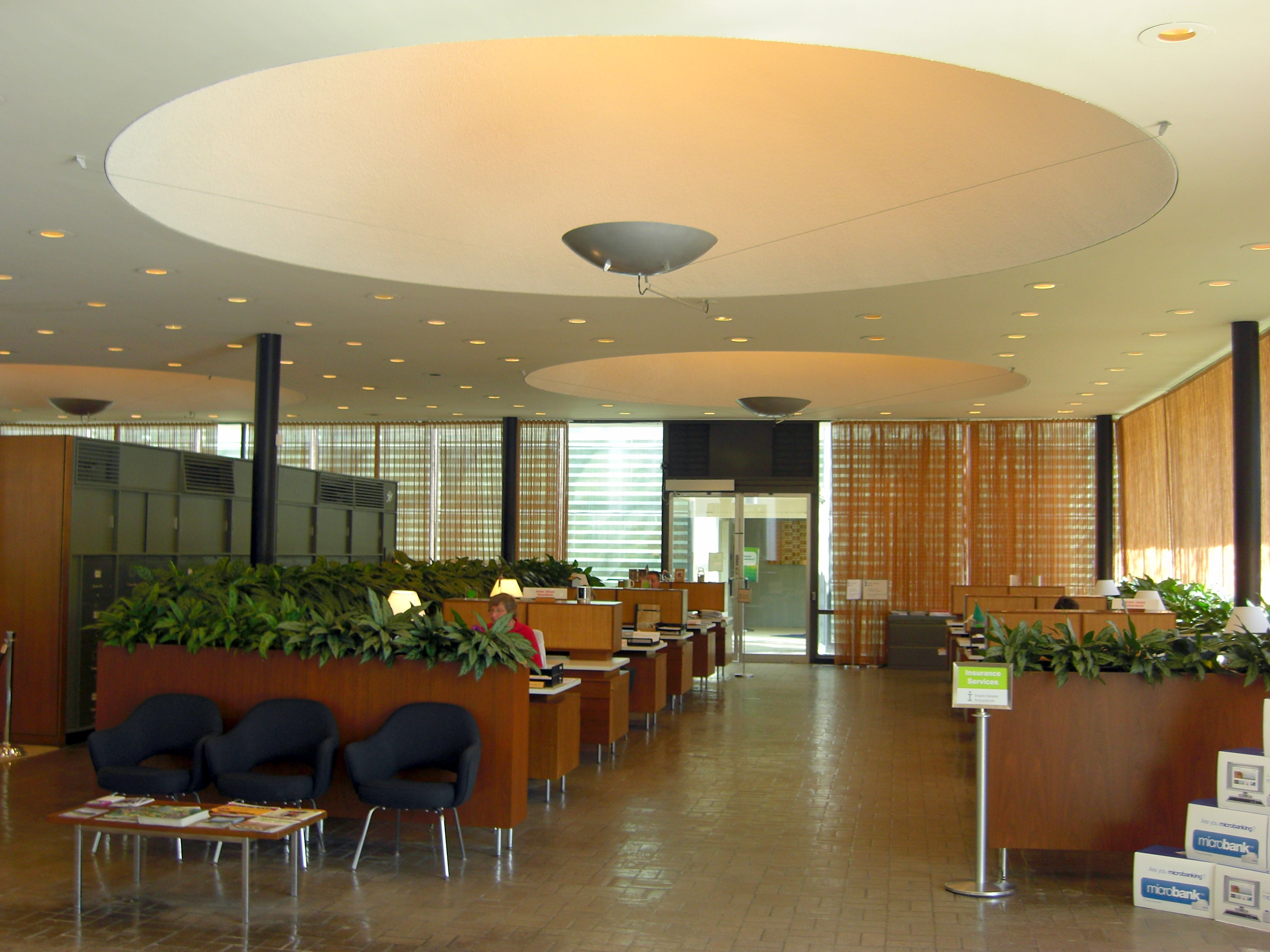
Interior of the banking hall, showing one of the domes

Saarinen was hired in 1950, and his involvement was publicized at the bank's annual stockholders' meeting in January 1951. The same month, the Irwin Union Trust Company obtained the Griffith Building at the northwest corner of Fifth and Washington streets, which at the time housed several businesses. The bank also acquired the Columbus Milling Company's mill just west of the Griffith Building, which included a grain elevator. The bank had chosen this site after carefully examining other sites in Columbus. In exchange, the Griffith Building's owners, Mr. and Mrs. Ray Marr, obtained Irwin Union Trust's existing structure and continued to lease it to the bank. Irwin Union Trust then announced that it would demolish the mill while leaving the Griffith Building intact. Work on the mill's demolition commenced that March, with scrap metal from the mill being sold.

Miller went to Saarinen's office in Michigan to discuss plans for the new bank. Saarinen, who knew nothing about the banking industry, accepted the commission "to learn the banking business". In developing the new building, Miller and other officials primarily sought to improve the bank's image by making the building feel welcoming. As the Courier Journal put it, "the money in the vault is only incidental" and could have been stored in any secure location. Saarinen carried this philosophy into the design of the new bank building, contrasting with the formidable designs of earlier banks. His design did not use the architectural elements of older banks, such as masonry facades or tellers' windows with iron bars. The architect assigned each department a specific part of the building based on how busy it was, allocating only as much space as needed.

The final plan called for a one-story building at the corner of Fifth and Washington streets and an office wing north of it. According to Miller, the building had a low form "so it won't look down on our nice old buildings", and the glass facade would allow people to "look in and watch us operate". The glass facade symbolized the bank's progressive mission, which included being one of the first American banks to issue credit cards. The building itself would be one of the United States' first banks to use glass walls and an open-plan layout. Saarinen hired Dan Kiley as the bank's landscape designer; Kiley did not meet Miller until later, when Kiley was hired to design the Miller House's gardens. As Saarinen later told his friend Astrid Sampe after spending a few days with her in Spain "It is a wonderful opportunity to do something really good and different because the client is simply out of this world. It is going to be a bank without any pompousness, absolutely no intention to impress. All it is a very low, glass enclosed, marketplace-like little building in the middle of the town."

==== Construction ====
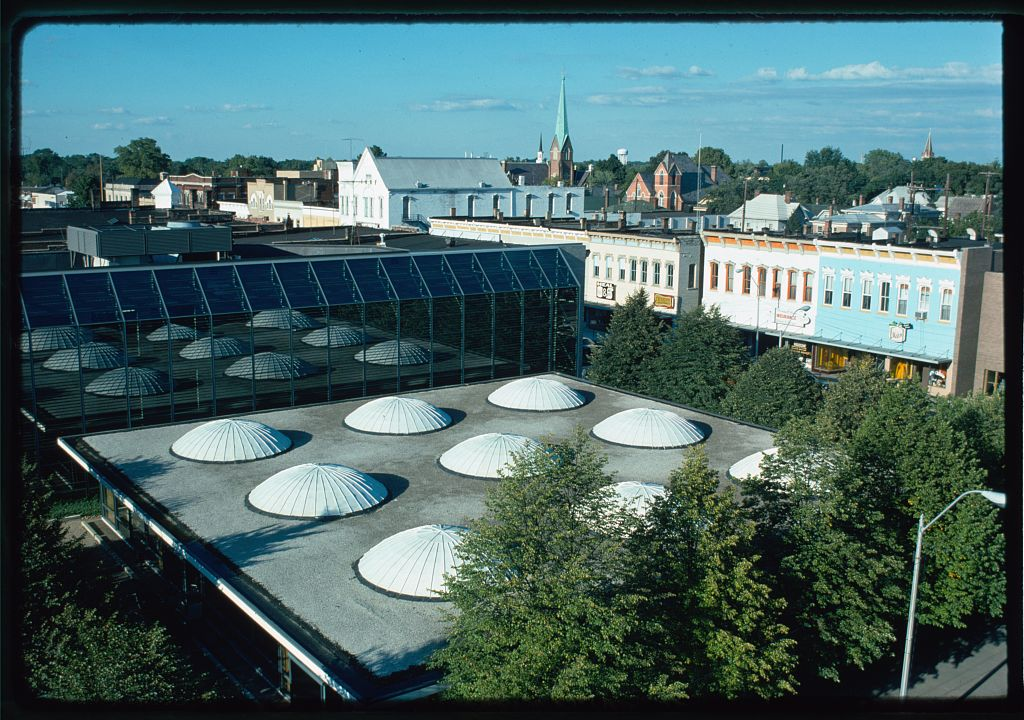
Aerial view from the south

Irwin Union Trust officials announced in January 1953 that they would begin constructing a modern-style bank building in downtown Columbus by either April or June. The Irwin Union Trust issued eviction notices to the Griffith Building's residents that April, and work on demolishing the Griffith Building began the next month. Eight firms submitted bids for the general contract to construct the building, and contracts were awarded to four Indiana–based firms that July. J. L. Simmons Company was hired as the general contractor, the Taylor Lumber and Supply Company as the mechanical engineer, the Long Electric Company as the electrical engineer, and the Service Elevator Company as the elevator contractor. Although construction began in 1953, most work did not start until the following year.

In April 1954, cement contractors went on strike while pouring the roof; much of the concrete work had been completed at the time. The vault door from the old 301 Washington Street bank was relocated to the new building that July. Workers demolished the old building's vault, an extremely difficult process that took several weeks because the vault was encased in 27 inches (690 mm) of concrete. The trees around the new building were being planted by December 1954, when bank officials announced that the bank would be renamed the Irwin Union Bank and Trust Company. The bank made an agreement with the owner of a neighboring property to repaint a brick wall facing the bank building. The bank had wanted to move into the new structure by January 1955, but this was delayed due to issues with delivering some equipment for the tellers' counters. In total, the building cost either $690,000 (Note: Equivalent to $6,463,000 in 2025) or $700,000 (Note: Equivalent to $6,557,000 in 2025)—about $20–$22 per square foot ($220–$240/m^{2}). (Note: Equivalent to $187–206 per square foot ($2,061–2,248 per square meter) in 2025)

=== Use as bank ===
==== Completion and early years ====
The bank moved all its departments from the old building to the new downtown branch on March 9, 1955, and the new building opened the next day, March 10. The relocation did not disrupt the bank's operations, since it took place while the bank was closed to the public. In contrast to the old branch, where different departments had maintained different operating hours, the new branch maintained one set of operating hours for all departments. The Irwin Union Bank and Trust Company hosted a three-day-long open house two weeks after the official opening; the open house attracted 5,000 visitors, including 2,555 on March 25 alone. The new building also hosted a tour for 800 bankers that April. The building won an award from the American Association of Nurserymen's (AAN) 1955 Plant America competition for its landscape design. Miller retained a small office in the old bank building at 301 Washington Street, working there for most of the rest of his life. Other parts of 301 Washington Street were leased to a drug store.

Observers made fun of the new bank building's roof, which they likened to a "brassiere factory". Even so, the design of the new building helped attract customers to the Irwin Union Bank, which grew nearly four times as fast in the new building as at the old location. A. R. Engle, an executive at the bank, credited the new building's design with improving workers' productivity, since departments were arranged more efficiently than in the previous bank building. During the 1960s, visitors frequented the building for its architecture as well. Due to the growth of the bank's business, the computer and operations departments were relocated to another building on 6th Street in 1965. Kevin Roche and John Dinkeloo, who had taken over Saarinen's practice, (Note: Saarinen had died in 1961.) redesigned the bank's drive-through facility in 1966, replacing the tellers' windows with three standalone booths. Kiley was rehired to design a lawn west of the banking hall (near Jackson Street), and a parking lot was added northwest of the building. Kiley added 107 linden trees to the lawn in 1968 and planted more than 7,500 flower bulbs around the building the next year.

==== 1970s expansion ====
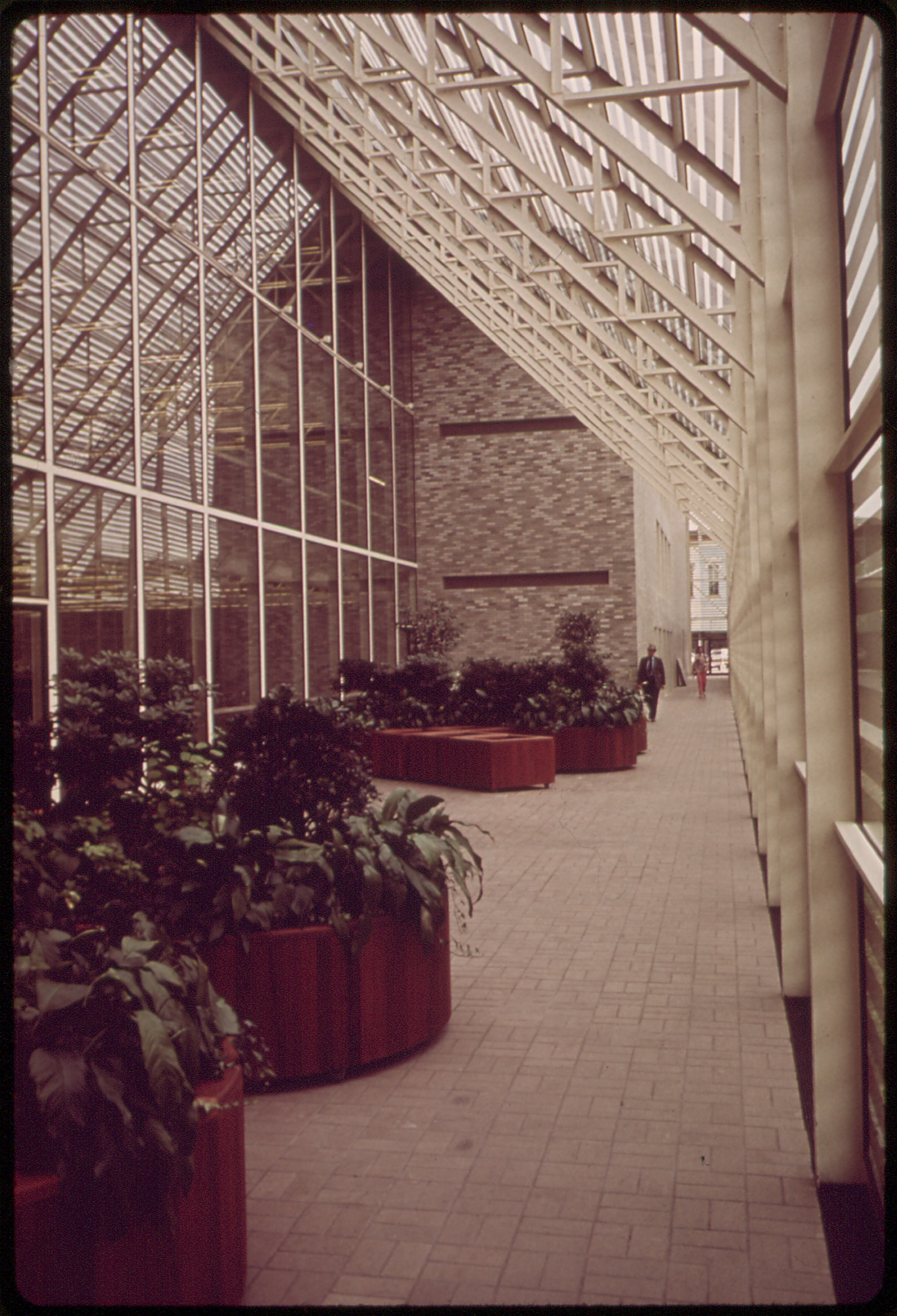
Interior of the 1970s annex's arcade

The bank had outgrown its downtown office by 1970, despite having opened five branches in Bartholomew County over the preceding fifteen years. The bank's staff had grown from 78 to 230 during that time. Irwin Union Bank officials announced plans in December 1970 to expand the downtown branch by 44,000 square feet (4,100 m^{2}), more than doubling the building's size while providing adequate space for all of the bank's departments. This project included a three-story office annex and a glass arcade connecting both the office wing and its annex. Roche and Dinkeloo were hired to design the annex, and Taylor Brothers Construction was hired as the general contractor. Before work began, the customer parking lot was relocated to the northwest corner of the site, and 25 trees on the site were relocated to Irwin Union's other branches.

Despite a construction accident in June 1971, when some of the annex's beams collapsed during a heavy wind, work proceeded with few delays. During the annex's construction, the original building celebrated the Irwin Union Bank's centennial with an exhibit displaying coinage, a bust of Joseph I. Irwin, and images of the bank's branches. The annex was one of several projects that were constructed as part of a revitalization of downtown Columbus. The annex was finished in 1973, and the landscape around the expanded bank won an award from the AAN that year. The annex originally contained the Irwin Union Bank's data-processing department in the basement, the bank's travel bureau on the first floor, a trust department on the second floor, and an accounting bureau on the third floor. An open house for the annex was held in October 1973, attracting 500 guests, including bankers from across the U.S.

==== Mid-1970s to 2000s ====
In 1976, to celebrate the United States Bicentennial, a time capsule was displayed at the bank's downtown branch and then buried under a nearby sidewalk. The bank's travel bureau was sold in 1980 to IVI Travel, which maintained the travel bureau's offices in the downtown branch. The next year, the Inland Mortgage Corporation opened an office in the banking hall, occupying space vacated by the home loan department. Prudential Bache Securities also opened an office at Irwin Union's downtown branch in 1984. To improve the branch's efficiency, the Irwin Union Bank relocated several of the downtown branch's departments from the office wings to the main banking hall in 1989. The insurance services department, which had been located at another branch, was relocated to the downtown office. The bank also sought to consolidate the offices of its subsidiary Irwin Union Capital Corporation, which were split between the Irwin Union Bank's downtown branch and a building across the street, so it simultaneously renovated the adjacent Sparrell Block Building at 520 Washington Street.

The Irwin Union Bank became the Irwin Financial Corporation in 1990, and the building's parking lot was renovated in the late 1990s. The branch's original design remained largely unchanged in the early 21st century; Architecture: The AIA Journal wrote in 2002 that an ATM and computers were the only visible alterations to the banking hall. The building became a designated National Historic Landmark in May 2000. Though Irwin Financial's headquarters remained in Columbus, it had expanded outside of Indiana, opening multiple branches across the U.S. Due to a shortage of space at its downtown offices, Irwin Financial announced plans in 2000 to expand into an adjacent lot at 526 Washington Street, and it acquired another building at 435 Washington Street in 2003. Saarinen and Roche-Dinkeloo's structure at 500 Washington Street hosted a commercial bank branch, along with administrative and operational offices. Other departments were placed within 520, 526, and 435 Washington Street.

Amid the Great Recession in the United States, Irwin Financial went into receivership in September 2009, and the Federal Deposit Insurance Corporation took over as the receiver. First Financial Bank of Hamilton, Ohio, purchased all deposits and almost all assets of Irwin Union Bank, including all of its branches. First Financial, which had been considering constructing an office complex in Columbus, canceled these plans after the merger, instead planning to use 500 Washington Street. The firm decided to construct another building several blocks away, at Third and Brown streets. First Financial sold the Irwin Union Bank Building to Cummins Inc. in October 2010 for $5.25 million.

=== Use as conference center ===
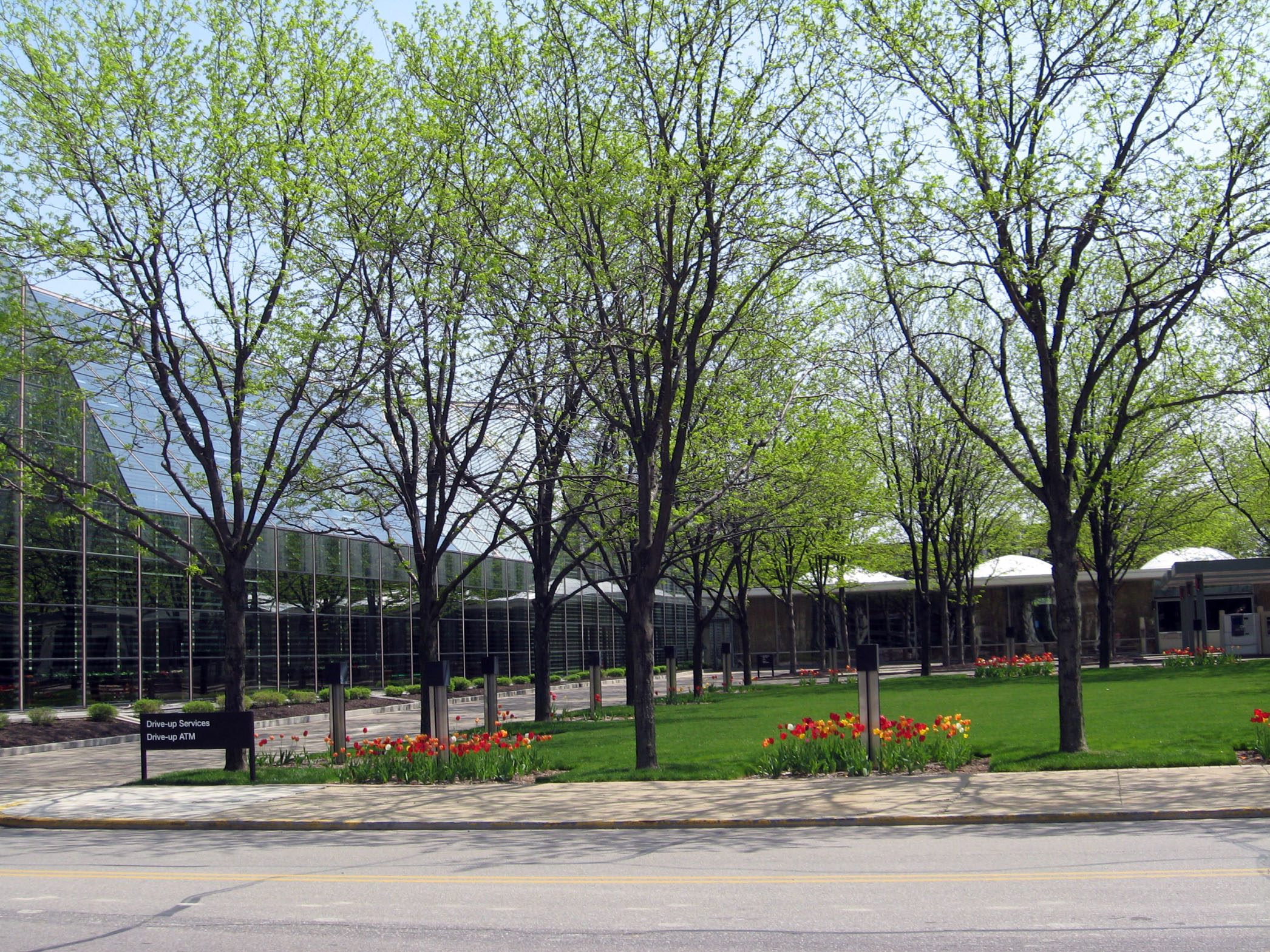
View from Jackson Street to the west

Cummins announced plans to renovate the building into office and meeting space for 350 workers. First Financial would continue to occupy the building until its new facility was completed in 2012, after which Cummins began its renovations. A local firm, Dunlap Contractors, was hired to conduct the renovation. By the end of 2012, Cummins was renovating the structure into the Irwin Office Building, which accommodated 525 employees. Cummins planned to convert the banking hall into an atrium, furnishing the building with mid-century furniture, while the rest of the building became open-plan offices. The initial renovation cost $7.1 million and did not involve a tax abatement. In 2013, Cummins requested and received a tax abatement for a $5.2 million renovation of Roche-Dinkeloo's 1970s annex, which included upgrading building systems and improving accessibility. Following the restoration, Docomomo International gave the building's renovation a Citation of Merit in 2015.

As part of the inaugural edition of the Exhibit Columbus art program, in 2017, Oyler Wu Collaborative repurposed three of the Irwin Conference Center's drive-through teller windows for a site-specific art installation called The Exchange. The designers won the J. Irwin and Xenia S. Miller Prize for this installation, which remained at the building for several years. The original banking structure was used as a conference center and workspace until the onset of the COVID-19 pandemic in Indiana during early 2020. The building was completely vacant by October 2022, and a sign within the building announced that the conference center was closed. In February 2024, Cummins announced that it would sell the Irwin Conference Center and its office annex, as well as the adjacent Cummins Sears office building; Toyota Material Handling negotiated to buy the Irwin Conference Center complex later that year.

== Impact ==
=== Reception ===
When the bank was constructed, the Courier Journal of Louisville, Kentucky, wrote that "about the only thing in the new Irwin Union Trust Company building that looks like a bank is the vault door". The Architectural Forum wrote that the Irwin Union Bank Building was "a building that belongs to its time and to the people of Columbus", and that the bank and the First Christian Church represented the city's 20th-century culture much as Columbus City Hall had represented the city's 19th-century culture. When the annex was built, a writer for the Cincinnati Post said that Roche's involvement in the annex's design "is both logical and appropriate since he continues [the Saarinen family's] concept of modern elegant design." Paul Goldberger, the architectural critic for The New York Times, wrote in 1976 that the Irwin Union Trust Bank was a "gracious" structure, calling it one of several unique buildings in Columbus that stood "among the well-crafted Victorian storefront buildings that could be anywhere". That year, Paul Gapp of the Chicago Tribune called the bank Columbus's "greatest architectural success", enhanced in part by Kiley's landscaping.

The Green Bay Press-Gazette wrote in 1989 that the building "has aged with immense grace" despite its simple design. Blair Kamin of the Chicago Tribune said that the bank building's style and scale were a suitable complement to the older structures nearby, despite its contemporary style, and Douglas Wissing of the Los Angeles Times wrote that the open plan had obviated the need for bulky tellers' windows. The preservationist Jeff Baker regarded the ceiling domes as impractical, since they carried sound across the room, but said that this unusual design feature was precisely why the building merited historical protection. When Miller died in 2004, The Washington Post wrote that the building he had commissioned for the Irwin Union Bank was "wonderfully transparent". Architecture writers Eeva-Liisa Pelkonen and Donald Albrecht, writing in 2006, said that the design "has a timeless quality thanks to the skillful blend of Miesian formality and warm Cranbrook touches".

A 2017 article in Cultured magazine said "the banking hall eschewed impenetrable temple designs for an almost unprecedented glass pavilion" and that the lack of barriers between tellers and customers was unusual for the era. In the 2020s, The Guardian regarded the building as having been "intended to feel more like a welcoming country store" than like traditional banks, and Matt Shaw said it was "an important project in the history of bank design". Writing about Eero Saarinen's work, a writer for Technology and Culture magazine wrote that the Irwin Union Trust Building was "a perfect glass box as radical as his father's church [the First Christian Church] had been". A writer for the ABA Banking Journal said the building's "very visible contents" were part of the allure of the building.

=== Architectural influence ===
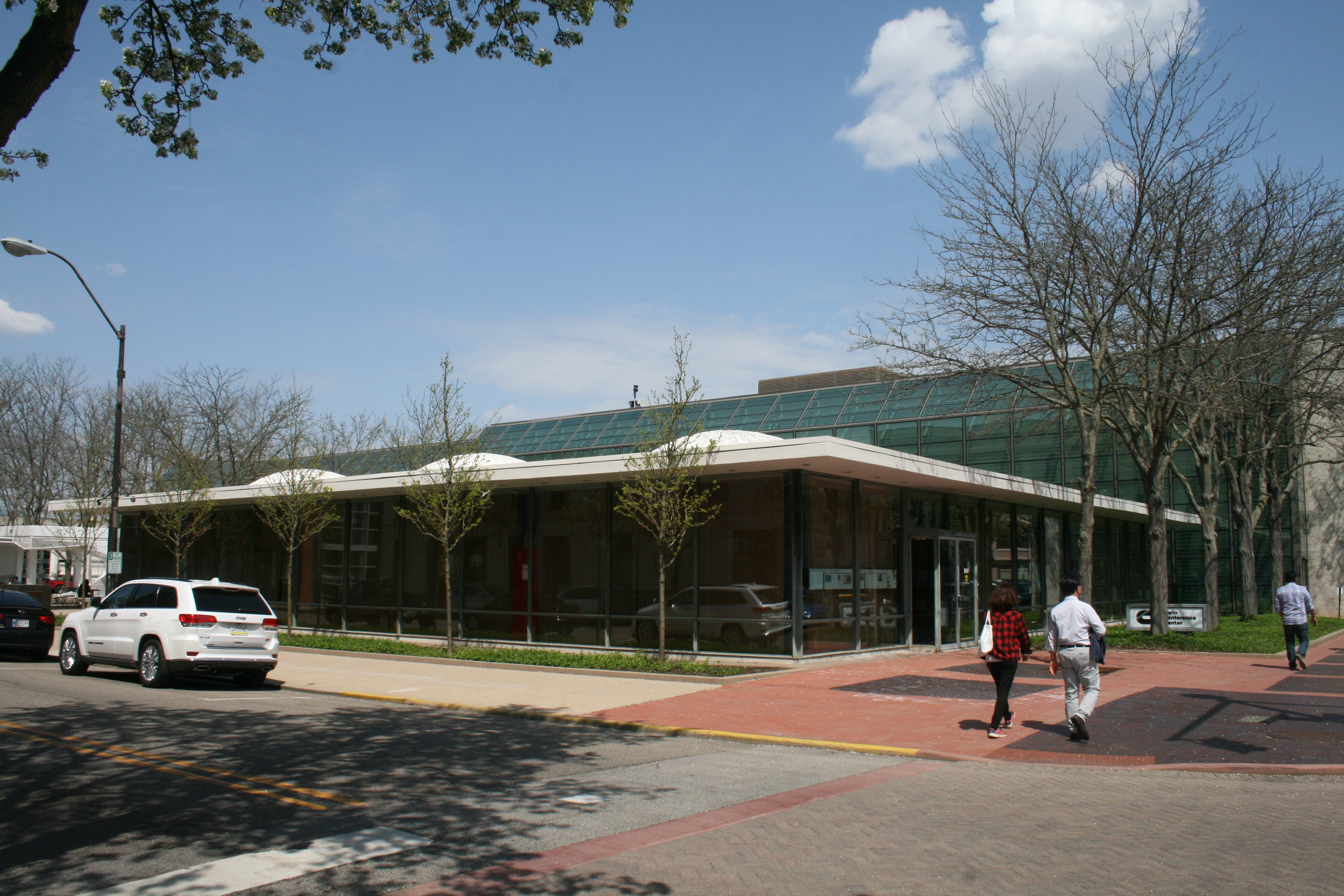
The main bank building viewed from across Fifth Street

The Irwin Union Bank Building helped inspire the designs of several of the bank's other branches. The building's roof was emulated at a branch at State and Mapleton streets, completed in 1961 and designed by Harry Weese. The Baltimore Sun wrote in 1975 that all of Irwin Union Bank's branches in Bartholomew County were "innovative and elegant", having been inspired by the quality of the downtown branch's design. Another branch of the bank, designed by Deborah Berke in 2000, was inspired by the downtown branch's lighting and decorations. The Irwin Union Bank Building also influenced the design of other bank buildings across the U.S. The building's design was likened to that of Skidmore, Owings, & Merrill's Manufacturers Trust Company Building in New York, which was completed around the same time. The Manufacturers Trust building also had an open plan and a glass facade, albeit with its offices hidden away and its vault highly visible.

Miller's satisfaction with the Irwin Union Bank Building's design prompted him to fund the design of other buildings in Columbus. He initially proposed paying for the city's schools before offering to finance other public buildings as well, and for several years, an average of two modernist structures were developed in Columbus annually. The Architectural Review of Britain described Saarinen's buildings for Miller as an "important legacy from Saarinen for the environment". The high concentration of modern buildings in Columbus, including the Irwin Union Bank Building, helped make it one of the American Institute of Architects' top U.S. cities for innovation and design. The building's design was also depicted in Columbus, a 2017 film set in the city.

In early 2000, the Irwin Union Bank Building and five other modernist structures in Columbus were nominated for designation as National Historic Landmarks (NHLs), which would add them to the National Register of Historic Places (NRHP). The United States Department of the Interior designated four of these buildings, including the Irwin Union Bank Building, as landmarks that May. This was the first time in U.S. history that several buildings were simultaneously designated as NHLs before turning 50 years old, the minimum age required for most buildings to be listed on the NRHP. The Irwin Union Bank Building was recognized as one of the first bank buildings in the U.S. to feature an open plan and glass facade; the designation allowed the building to qualify for federal preservation funds. The landmark nominations themselves received national media attention, in part because very few NRHP sites were designated as NHLs, let alone multiple sites in such a small area.

== See also ==
- List of National Historic Landmarks in Indiana
- National Register of Historic Places listings in Bartholomew County, Indiana
- List of works by Eero Saarinen
