= Progressive Preservation =

- Location: Columbus, Indiana, United States
- Founder: Landmark Columbus Foundation
- Established: 2015
- Status: Active
- Website: https://landmarkcolumbusfoundation.org/progressive-preservation

Progressive Preservation is a contemporary approach to heritage conservation that integrates preservation, community engagement, and design innovation. The term is most closely associated with the work of the Landmark Columbus Foundation (LCF) in Columbus, Indiana, which has developed programs to care for, celebrate, and advance the city's cultural heritage of architecture, landscapes, and public art.

Progressive Preservation differs from traditional historic preservation practices by emphasizing adaptive reuse, community participation, and integrating new design into historic contexts. It positions preservation as a proactive, future‑oriented practice that sustains cultural resources while enabling communities to thrive.

== Origins ==
The concept of Progressive Preservation emerged in Columbus, Indiana, a city internationally recognized for its modernist architecture and public design legacy. Since the mid‑20th century, Columbus has fostered design excellence through partnerships between civic leaders, architects, and patrons.

In 2015, the Heritage Fund — The Community Foundation of Bartholomew County launched Landmark Columbus to extend this legacy of stewardship. In late 2019, the initiative became part of the independent nonprofit Landmark Columbus Foundation, which now serves as the community's anchor institution for Progressive Preservation.

== Definition and principles ==
Progressive Preservation is defined by several core principles:

- Stewardship of cultural resources – Caring for significant buildings, landscapes, and artworks through conservation and documentation.
- Community collaboration – Engaging local partners, volunteers, and institutions in preservation projects.
- Design integration – Encouraging contemporary designers to respond to historic contexts, creating dialogue between past and present.
- Education and advocacy – Building public understanding of cultural heritage through symposia, exhibitions, tours, and events.
- Sustainability and equity – Promoting preservation as a means to create inclusive, livable, and environmentally responsible communities.

== Projects and initiatives ==
=== North Christian Church conservation plan ===
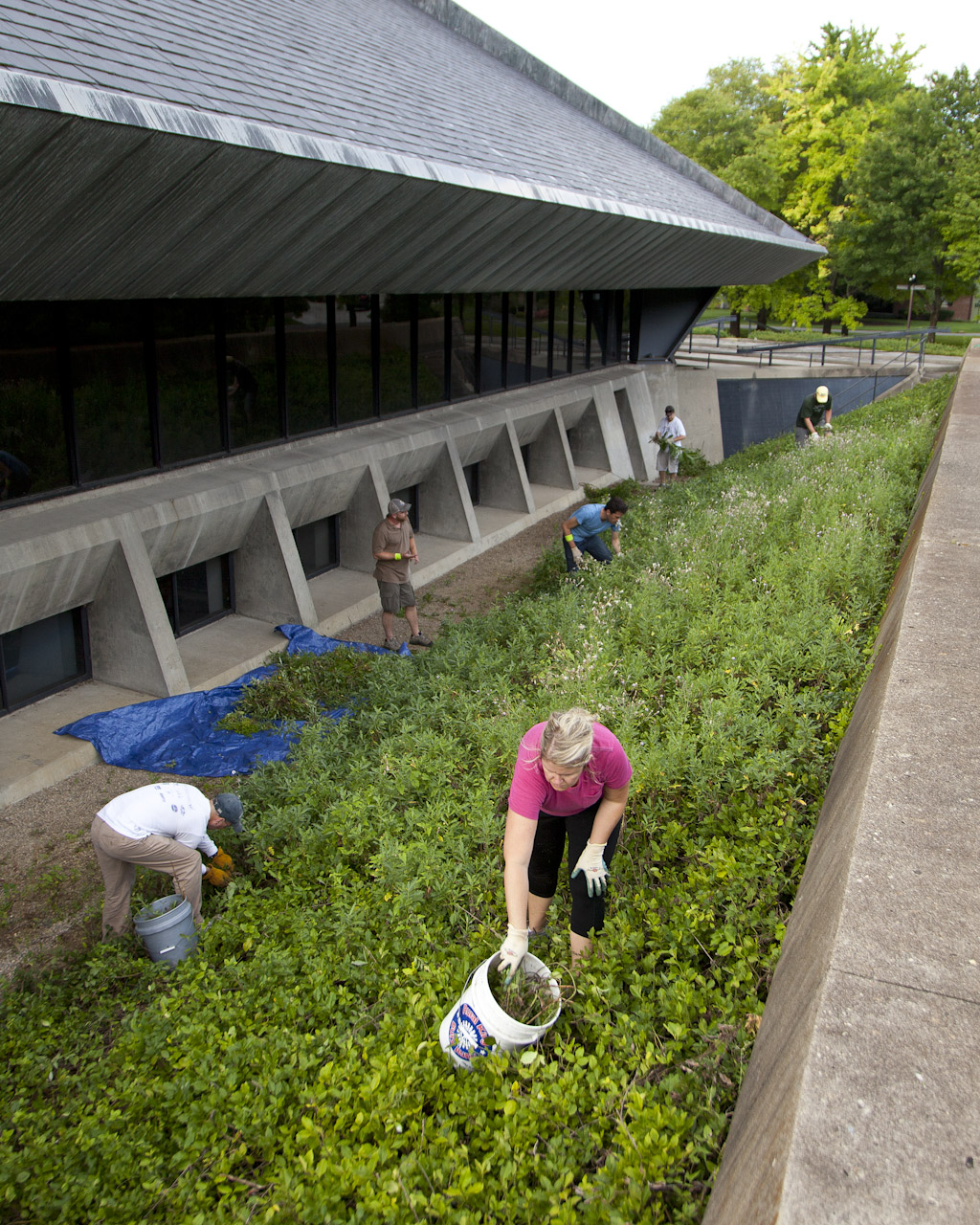
2015 North Christian Church Landscape Clean Up

In 2019, Landmark Columbus received a Getty Foundation Keeping It Modern grant to lead the development of a conservation management plan for North Christian Church (Eero Saarinen, 1964). The project engaged preservation experts, landscape architects, and design researchers to ensure the building's long‑term care.

=== Friends of First Christian Church Architecture ===
Launched in 2017, this initiative brought together Landmark Columbus, Indiana Landmarks, the Heritage Fund, and the First Christian Church congregation to restore and maintain the Saarinens’ 1942 First Christian Church. Its first major project was the repair and restoration of the church's skylight, completed in 2018. In 2023 the effort helped fund the restoration of the iconic clock tower.

=== Crump Theatre revitalization ===
Following the 2019 Exhibit Columbus installation Love Letter to the Crump by Borderless Studio in 2019, Landmark Columbus Foundation helped bring new attention to the historic Crump Theatre and supported efforts toward its adaptive reuse.

=== Cultural resource inventory ===
In 2020, Landmark Columbus conducted a survey of modern resources in Bartholomew County, later expanding findings to dozens of sites. The study, supported by local partners, explored mechanisms to ensure long‑term care of significant properties.

=== Carole Wantz exhibitions ===
In 2021, the LCF collaborated with the Indiana State Museum to present The Artwork of Carole Wantz: Collected Stories from Columbus, Indiana, a retrospective that included around 30 paintings by Carole Wantz that were created between 1975 and 1985. The exhibition ran from April through July 2021 in the Thomas A. King Bridge Gallery at the museum. The exhibition was also featured in The New York Times Magazine’s “T List.”

Later that year, LCF coordinated a display of Wantz's work in downtown Columbus, Indiana. The Bartholomew County Historical Society, Cummins Inc., the Indiana State Museum, the Miller House and Garden, and private collectors subsequently acquired several paintings.

In 2022, the Richmond Art Museum presented Homecoming: The Artwork of Carole Wantz, on view from February 12 through April 30. The show included a public reception and artist talk on April 3, 2022.

=== Early public programs ===
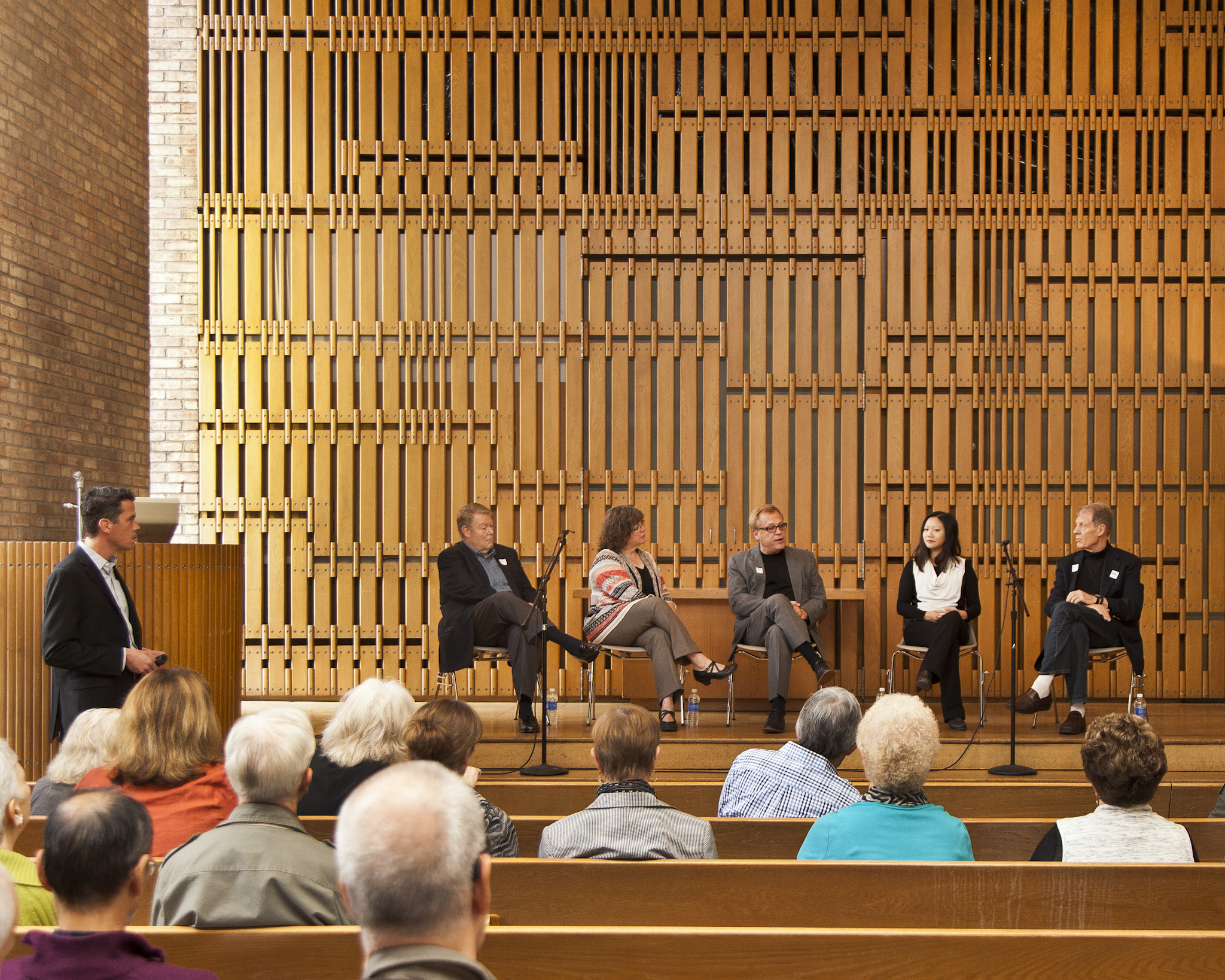
Landmark Columbus' 2015 Columbus Conversation in the chapel at First Christian Church

Progressive Preservation also includes public‑facing events, many of which are undertaken by other organizations in the community:

- Columbus Conversations – Occasional events on architecture and heritage.
- Chaotic Tuesdays – Monthly activation of Jean Tinguely's Chaos I kinetic sculpture.
- Community cleanups and bike tours – Volunteer‑based efforts linking preservation with civic life.
- Partnerships with Exhibit Columbus – Integrating preservation into contemporary design exhibitions.

== Institutional role ==
Landmark Columbus Foundation is structured as a 501(c)(3) nonprofit supporting organization. Its three program areas—Progressive Preservation, Exhibit Columbus, and Columbus Design Institute—are interwoven to advance cultural heritage and design excellence.

Financial support has come from national and local sources, including Lilly Endowment Inc., the Getty Foundation, and the Efroymson Family Fund, alongside community donors and volunteers.

== Impact ==
Progressive Preservation has become a model for how mid‑sized American cities can sustain world‑class cultural resources. By combining preservation, education, and design, it extends Columbus's modern legacy into the future while serving as an example for other communities.

== See also ==
- Exhibit Columbus
- Historic preservation in the United States
- Adaptive reuse
