= Richard McCoy =

Richard McCoy may refer to:

- Richard McCoy Jr. (1942–1974), American aircraft hijacker
- Richard McCoy (politician) (1863–1942), Australian politician
- Richard B. McCoy (c.1821–1902), American politician
- Richard F. McCoy (c.1855–1916), Irish politician
- Richard S. McCoy, arts leader
