= Cummins Corporate Office Building =

Building in Columbus, Indiana, US

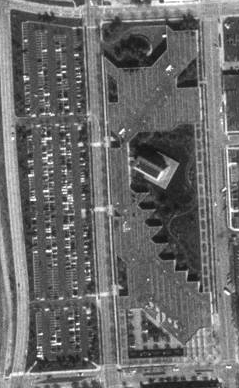
- Aerial view, Cerealine building center
- Interactive map of the Cummins Corporate Office Building area
- Former names: Cerealine building

General information
- Type: Corporate headquarters
- Architectural style: Modernist
- Location: 500 Jackson Street, Columbus, Indiana, United States
- Coordinates: 39.20612°N 85.92405°W
- Completed: 1983
- Owner: Cummins

Technical details
- Structural system: Precast concrete and glass
- Floor area: 200,000 sq ft (19,000 m^{2})

Design and construction
- Architect: Kevin Roche
- Architecture firm: Kevin Roche John Dinkeloo and Associates

The Cummins Corporate Office Building is a modernist office building in Columbus, Indiana, United States, designed by Kevin Roche. Constructed in 1983, the building serves as the corporate headquarters of the Cummins engine company. It was constructed on an old railroad yard and is unique for being built around the Cerealine Building, which was Cummins' first factory building.

== Background ==
Cummins CEO J. Irwin Miller had "a lifelong interest in architecture", and in the 1950s established a foundation to pay architecture fees for new public buildings in Columbus and Bartholomew County. When Cummins decided to construct a new corporate headquarters, it turned to Pritzker Prize-winning architect Kevin Roche of the firm Roche-Dinkeloo.

== Structure ==
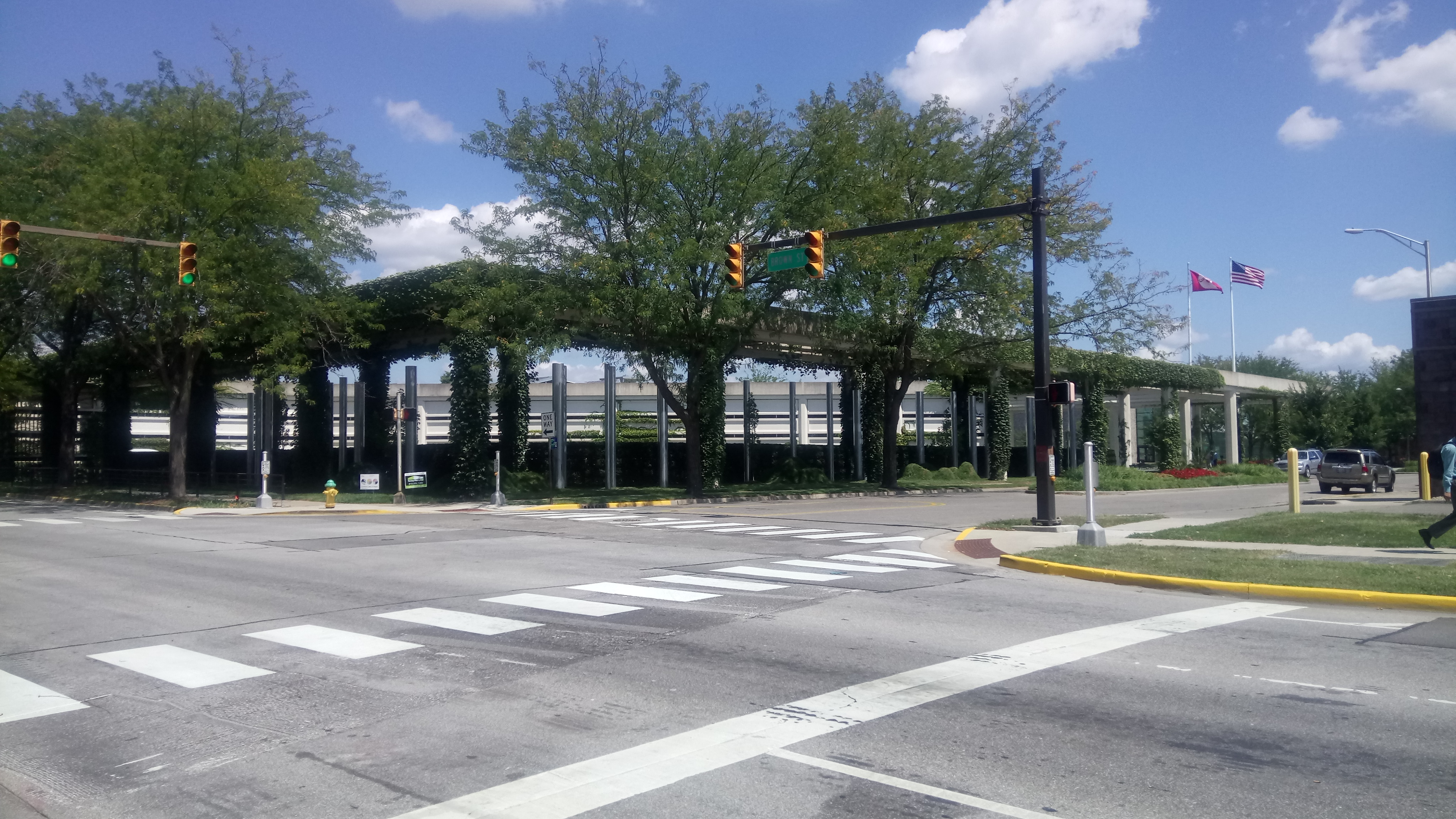
A ground view of the office

The building is built on a three-block plot of land that formerly served as a rail yard in downtown Columbus. As part of its distinctive construction, Roche built the new precast concrete structure around the original Cerealine Building, which served as Cummins' first factory and administrative offices. The original building was also renovated to serve as the cafeteria for the employees of the company.

Roche used precast concrete and glass as his primary building elements in the 200,000 sq ft (19,000 m^{2}) building. Jack Curtis executed the landscaping for the facility, including the large open green area on the eastern side that is open to the public as a park. As of 2013, it remained in use as Cummins' corporate headquarters.

In 2017 Cummins began a $50 million renovation of the building, scheduled for completion in 2019. The renovation, designed by HOK, was completed in November 2024.

== Sculpture ==
As part of the construction, Roche incorporated a Rudolph de Harak sculpture known as the Exploded Engine in the lobby of the building.

== See also ==
- Irwin Conference Center, property on an adjacent block also owned by Cummins
