= Exhibit Columbus =

Biannual exhibition in Columbus, Indiana, US

- Exhibit Columbus
- Genre: Festival, Biennale
- Frequency: Biannually
- Location: Columbus, Indiana
- Years active: 10
- Inaugurated: 2016
- Founder: Landmark Columbus Foundation
- Website: http://www.exhibitcolumbus.org

Exhibit Columbus is a program that culminates in an exhibition of temporary, site-specific works in architecture, landscape, art, and design staged across civic sites in Columbus, Indiana. Produced by the Landmark Columbus Foundation, the program includes four key events over a two-year cycle: curatorial kick-off, symposium, design presentations, and exhibition. The effort aims to foreground the city's modernist legacy while commissioning contemporary installations by emerging and established practices. A signature component is the J. Irwin and Xenia S. Miller Prize, which pairs prize recipients with notable Columbus sites for new commissions.

== History ==
Exhibit Columbus launched in 2016, as a program of the Landmark Columbus Foundation to "reinvigorate" the city's culture of design patronage and connect contemporary practice to Columbus' mid-century civic architecture. The inaugural exhibition opened in August 2017 with 18 temporary, site-responsive installations spanning downtown streets, parks, and landmark buildings. Subsequent cycles in 2019, 2021, 2023, and 2025 continued a biennial rhythm, with a variety of public events that introduce the participants and partners to the program.

== Program and format ==
Each exhibition commissions site-specific works by Miller Prize recipients alongside University Design Research Fellows and locally embedded civic or community projects. Commissions are paired with significant sites (e.g., I.M. Pei's Cleo Rogers Memorial Library, Eliel Saarinen's First Christian Church, Michael Van Valkenburgh's Mill Race Park), and are developed with local partners through public presentations and engagement. Communications and wayfinding are integrated each cycle, and exhibitions are accompanied by tours, talks, and public programs.

=== Miller Prize ===
The prize commissions four to five teams each cycle for large public installations at landmark sites. Recipients since 2017 include practices such as Oyler Wu Collaborative, SO–IL, Frida Escobedo, MASS Design Group, Dream the Combine, Studio Zewde, PAU, and Studio Cooke John.

== Exhibitions ==
=== 2017: Inaugural ===
The first exhibition presented 18 temporary works including five Miller Prize installations along Fifth Street and additional projects curated for Washington Street and by university teams. Miller Prize installations included IKD's Conversation Plinth at Pei's library plaza and studio:indigenous' Wiikiaami at First Christian Church; additional gallery projects featured Snarkitecture and Formafantasma downtown.

=== 2019: Good Design and the Community ===
Five Miller Prize works anchored the second exhibition, including SO–IL's Into the Hedge at the courthouse lawn, Bryony Roberts Studio's Soft Civic at City Hall, and projects by Agency Landscape + Planning, MASS Design Group, and Frida Escobedo.

=== 2021: New Middles: From Main Street to Megalopolis ===
Co-curated by Mimi Zeiger and Iker Gil, the third exhibition explored "middle" contexts across geographies and infrastructures, with Miller Prize works by Dream the Combine, Ecosistema Urbano, Future Firm, Olalekan Jeyifous, and Sam Jacob Studio, among others.

=== 2023: Public by Design ===
The fourth cycle emphasized co-creation and community programming, with Miller Prize installations by Tatiana Bilbao Estudio (Designed by the public), PAU (InterOculus), PORT (The Plot Project), and Studio Zewde (Echoes of the Hill). Coverage noted 12–13 new commissions across downtown Columbus and Mill Race Park with extensive public events.

=== 2025: Yes And ===
Yes And commissioned four Miller Prize installations—Adaptive Operations (Crump Theatre), AD—WO (former Irwin Block site), Studio Barnes (Jackson Street Parking Garage), and Studio Cooke John (First Christian Church courtyard)—framed as a participatory call to shape positive change from existing materials and stories.

== Reception and impact ==
Exhibit Columbus has been covered by national and international design media for reviving Columbus's tradition of civic design through contemporary, community-engaged commissions. Additional coverage highlights collaborations with local schools, libraries, and parks, and the program's role in expanding public conversations about design.

== See also ==
- List of architecture prizes
- ArtPrize
- Chicago Architecture Biennial
- Design Indaba
- Prospect New Orleans
- Venice Biennale of Architecture
