= First Christian Church (Columbus, Indiana) =

Building and congregation in Indiana, US

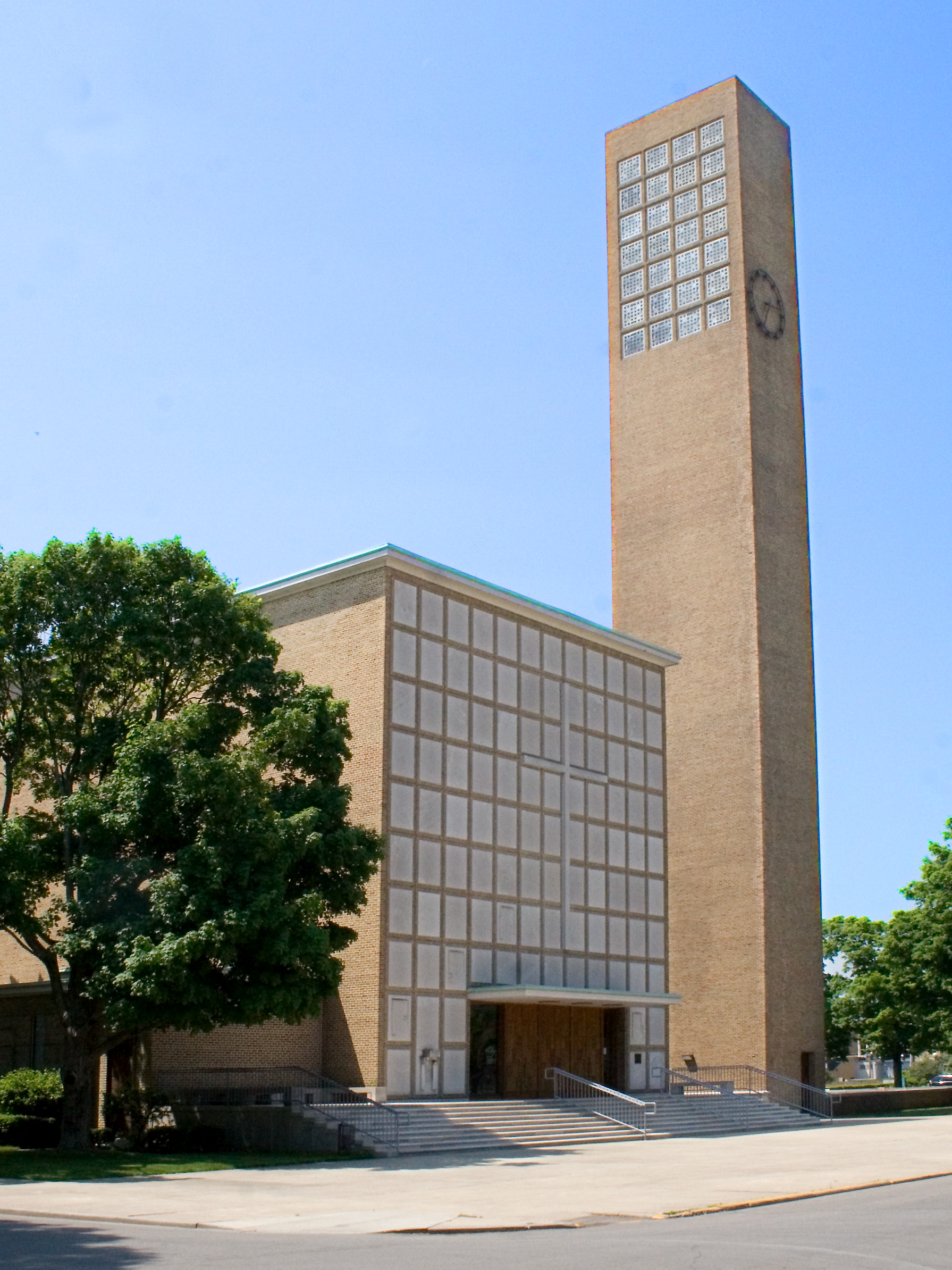
- First Christian Church
- 39°12′11″N 85°55′8″W
- Address: 531 Fifth St., Columbus, Indiana
- Country: United States
- Denomination: Interdenominational

History
- Status: Active
- Founded: 1855 (congregation)
- Dedicated: May 31, 1942 (building)

Architecture
- Architects: Eliel Saarinen (main architect); Eero Saarinen (other details); Charles Eames (furnishings)
- Style: Modern
- Groundbreaking: April 20, 1941
- Construction cost: $0.70–0.75 million (1942)

Specifications
- Capacity: 800
- Height: 166 ft (51 m)
- First Christian Church
- U.S. National Register of Historic Places
- U.S. National Historic Landmark
- U.S. Historic district – Contributing property
- Location within Bartholomew County, Indiana Location within Indiana Location within the United States
- Area: 4 acres (1.6 ha)
- Part of: Columbus Historic District (ID82000059)
- NRHP reference No.: 01000067

Significant dates
- Added to NRHP: January 3, 2001
- Designated NHL: January 3, 2001
- Designated CP: December 10, 1982

The First Christian Church (originally known as the Tabernacle Church of Christ) is a church building at 531 Fifth Street in Columbus, Indiana, United States. The building was designed by Eliel Saarinen, with some details overseen by his son Eero Saarinen and his associate Charles Eames. Built in 1942, it was the first modern-style building in Columbus and one of the first churches in the United States to be built in a contemporary architectural style. It houses the First Christian Church congregation, which is nondenominational and was founded in 1855 as the Christian Congregation in Columbus. The building has received praise for its design over the years and is designated as a National Historic Landmark.

The church is divided into four sections: an east wing, a west wing, a connecting bridge between the wings, and a freestanding 166-foot-tall (51 m) tower or campanile. The two wings flank a sunken courtyard, which originally had a reflecting pool. In general, the church's facade is made of brick, stone, and concrete, along with sash windows. The main entrance, in the east wing, leads up to a small vestibule and an asymmetrical 800-seat sanctuary with a balcony. Steps from the sanctuary lead to a chancel with a baptistery, choir, tapestry, and church organ. There is also a chapel south of the sanctuary, and an auditorium, reception room, kitchen, and pantry in the basement. The bridge and the west wing contain offices and classrooms, while the tower houses a clock.

The congregation dates to 1855, when the Christian Congregation in Columbus split from the New Hope Church. After a succession of pastors, the congregation moved to a new site in 1878 or 1879, becoming the Tabernacle Church of Christ. Two siblings, William G. Irwin and Linnie I. Sweeney, acquired the current site in 1936 following substantial growth in the congregation. The Saarinens were hired to design a modern-style building after another architect withdrew from the project. Construction started in 1940, and the new church was dedicated on May 31, 1942; the congregation subsequently became the Christian Church, then the First Christian Church. Over the years, several congregations have split from the First Christian Church, including the short-lived Central Christian Church and the North Christian Church. The First Christian Church building was expanded in the early 2000s, and the tower was restored in the 2020s.

== Site ==
The First Christian Church spans an entire city block in downtown Columbus, Indiana, United States, surrounded clockwise from north by Fifth Street, Lafayette Avenue, Fourth Street, and Franklin Street. There are lawns and trees around the grounds, in contrast to similar churches that lacked such features.

The church, which is designed in a modernist style, is surrounded by numerous buildings of a similar style. Along Fifth Street in downtown Columbus, such modern-styled buildings include the Cummins Corporate Office Building, Cleo Rogers Memorial Library, and Irwin Union Bank. The library and the Columbus visitor's center are directly across Fifth Street to the north, and the grounds of the library contain the Large Arch sculpture by Henry Moore, which faces the church. The church is also close to other structures such as The Republic Newspaper Office and Columbus City Hall, along with the city's post office and the Lincoln Elementary School. A writer for local newspaper The Republic described the First Christian Church, Cleo Rogers Memorial Library, and Columbus City Hall as forming a "plaza" area in downtown Columbus, alongside the Storey and Irwin houses flanking the library.

== Architecture ==
The First Christian Church was designed by Eliel Saarinen, in conjunction with his son Eero. At the time of the building's development in the 1940s, the two men worked closely together, and many parts of the design cannot be attributed definitively to either man. The writer Harry McCawley states that Eero probably helped with planning, while Charles Eames, later to become a prominent furniture designer in his own right, designed other details. The architectural historian Russell D. Rudzinski attributes the massing, or general shape, to Eero but says that his father was certainly responsible for the articulation of details.

Rather than imitating a historic style with no direct relevance to Columbus, the design reflects the fundamentals of Christian faith in the church design, in an effort to unite the different denominations in the town. Eliel had believed Modern architecture was particularly appropriate for this form of Christianity, in that the church would be based on the fundamentals of religion and architecture and freed from traditional theology and style. Compared with more traditionally-styled churches, the First Christian Church has relatively simple architectural details.

The First Christian Church is one of seven buildings in Columbus designated as National Historic Landmarks. The others are The Republic Newspaper Office, the Mabel McDowell Adult Education Center, the Miller House, the Irwin Union Bank Building, the North Christian Church, and the First Baptist Church.

=== Form ===
The church has an asymmetrical massing and is divided into four sections: an east wing, a west wing, a connecting bridge between the wings, and a freestanding tower or campanile. The sanctuary and chapel, in the eastern wing, are sometimes considered as distinct masses. The Sunday school occupies the west wing. The various parts of the church could be accessed from the street on all four sides; the bridge is accessible from a terrace to the south. One writer said that Eliel had deliberately used an asymmetrical layout to create "active tension and coherent balance" throughout the structure. The asymmetrical massing had been Eliel's idea; Eero's daughter Susan later reflected that her father had liked symmetrical, geometrical designs, while her grandfather preferred designs with features that balanced each other out.

The two wings flank a sunken courtyard, which is cited as being located 8 feet (2.4 m) or 10 feet (3.0 m) beneath street level. The sunken courtyard is accessed by steps on the north and south; the northern stair is situated between the east wing and the tower. The earth and the pavement in the courtyard are arranged in a similar way to the facade's brick frame and glass windows. The courtyard is surrounded by a brick retaining wall, with a bosque extending above Fifth Street and benches near the corner of Fifth and Franklin streets.

The courtyard originally had a pool measuring 120 by 140 feet (37 m × 43 m) across, with a maximum depth of 3 1/2 feet (1.1 m). The pool occupied much of the courtyard's northern or front end, and its former perimeter is delineated by walkways. A reflective material was applied to the bottom of the pool, while a brick parapet surrounded it. The pool was removed in 1957 or 1960 because it was difficult to maintain. The rest of the area forms a terrace, which is surrounded on three sides by the west and east wings and a footbridge between the two wings. The entire terrace is paved in a mosaic pattern and surrounded by plants and flowerbeds. The terrace could be configured to host events such as classes, morning services, and chorus practice.

=== Facade ===
In general, the church's facade is made of Indiana limestone and brick, inlaid in a grid-like pattern. The facade has concrete details, steel-sash or wooden doors, and steel-sash windows. Unlike similar churches, the First Christian Church has flat roofs. It also uses leaded glass panels in lieu of stained glass; a director of the Columbus Visitors Bureau's director said that Eliel Saarinen saw sunlight as "a gift from God", to remain unsullied by stained glass. The use of brick was intended to give the facade texture, and the brickwork's horizontal and vertical joints were designed in a similar manner to a woven tapestry. Some of the windows are recessed behind grilles, creating the impression of perforated openings. The building does not incorporate elements of established architectural styles. Architectural Forum wrote that the church's stylistic deviation was because "any honest, fundamental approach has to be contemporary", while The Indianapolis Star wrote that the design referenced how the Disciples of Christ denomination tended to "discard human opinions and traditions".

==== East wing ====
The northern elevation of the east wing's facade is the only part of the east wing that has significant decoration and is divided into a grid of rectangles measuring 12 units across and 10 units tall. It contains the sanctuary's entrance, which is accessed by a 3.5-foot-high (1.1 m) limestone stoop that spans the wing's width. The stoop ascends to a terrace of similar width, which measures 20 feet (6.1 m) deep, with benches at its western and eastern ends. The entrance itself consists of three wood-framed double doors, flanked by narrow sidelights. The doors themselves have vertical and horizontal oak strips, along with stainless-steel handles. Above the doors is a concrete canopy, which cantilevers outward from the facade and has a geometric motif carved into its soffit.

The nave's left-hand aisle protrudes asymmetrically from the east (left) side of the entrance, with a lower roof than the rest of the wing. Above and around the entrance, limestone panels protrude about 3 inches (76 mm) from a grid-like frame made of brick, creating a textured grid that functions as the facade's main decorative feature. A Christian cross, made of limestone and painted yellow, is mounted asymmetrically on the facade above the entrance. The cross terminates just above the entrance canopy, which, according to Rudzinski, drew attention to the entrance. There is also space for a sculpture on the left side of the entrance, though the sculpture was never cast, having been interrupted due to bronze shortages during World War II.

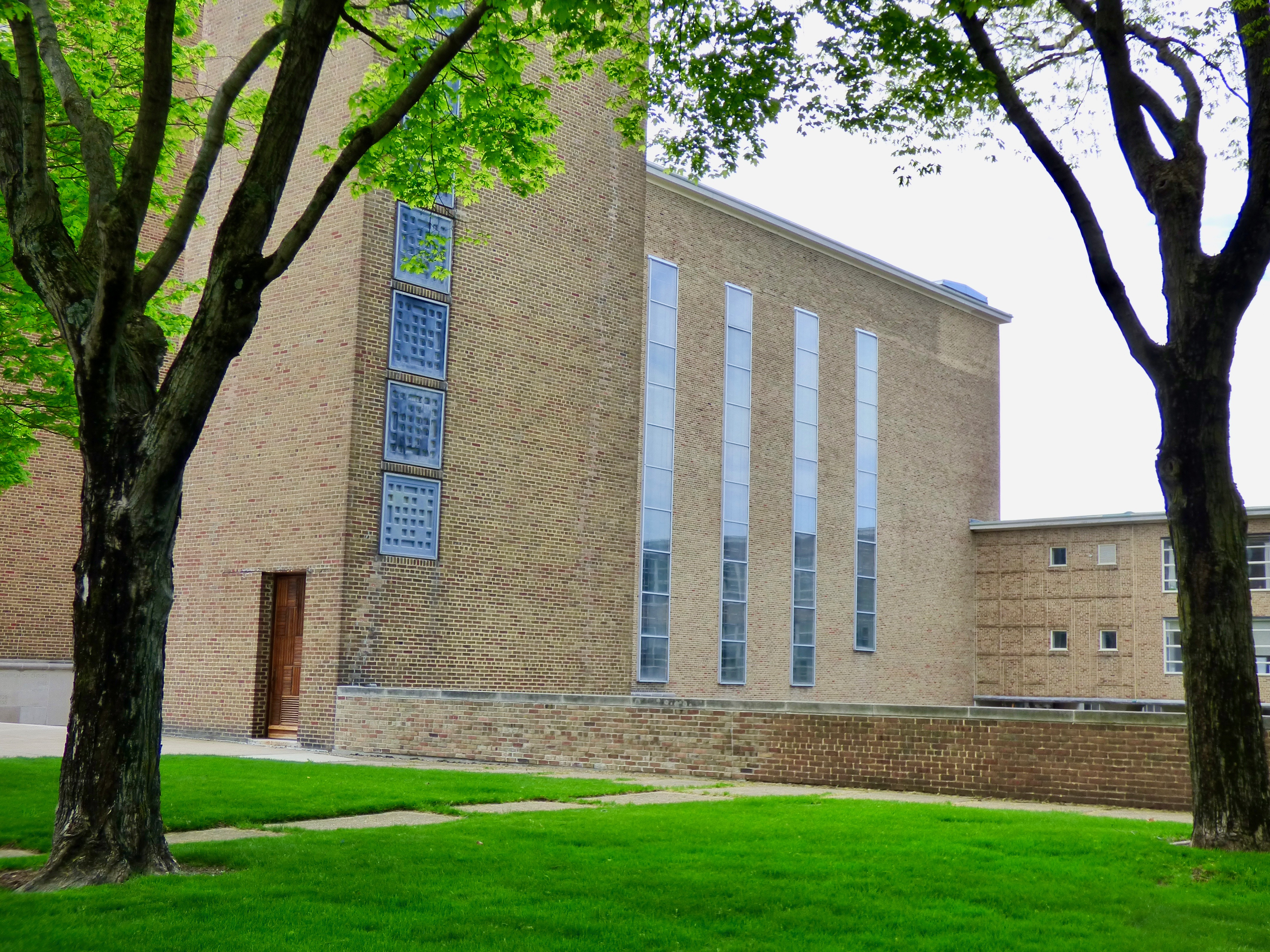
Western facade of east wing

In the northern part of the east wing's western elevation, there are several windows illuminating the auditorium in the basement, which are placed within a limestone frame. Above the basement, tall translucent leadlights on the western elevation, separated by masonry piers, illuminate the sanctuary. The tall windows evoked the design of the neighboring tower; behind the bridge, a chapel with a chimney created a similar design effect. There are doorways leading to the courtyard from the Sunday school classroom and the sanctuary's reception room. The building's cornerstone, a 1,300-pound (590 kg) Bedford limestone slab, contains inscriptions with important dates in the congregation's history and a copper box with various artifacts. (Note: The dates are 1829, the founding of the congregation's predecessor, New Hope Church; 1855, the founding of the First Christian Church's congregation; and 1941, the year of the groundbreaking ceremony. The artifacts include newspapers, coins, books, documents relating to the church, and other texts.)

==== West wing and connecting bridge ====
The east and west wings are connected by a two-story enclosed bridge, which overlooks the campanile and former reflecting pool. It is supported by two parallel rows of six limestone columns; the northern row's square columns were intended to complement the pool, while the southern row has octagonal and circular columns to encourage people to move around. The easternmost two columns in each row have reliefs and are grouped in pairs. The northern and southern elevations of the bridge have similar facade designs, which differ only in the patterns used on the facade. On either elevation, there are horizontally-arranged, steel-framed sash windows in the center and relief panels with rectangular windows at either end. Inside, there is a corridor on the southern side of either level, along with classrooms and other spaces occupying the rest of the bridge.

The rooms in the west wing also have large glass windows, including in the basement, where the windows open onto the terrace. The west wing has two stories on its western elevation, facing Franklin Street, where there are stairs leading to an entrance. The wing rises to three stories on its eastern elevation, facing the terrace. Like the bridge, the west wing has steel-framed sash windows, which are arranged horizontally.

==== Tower ====
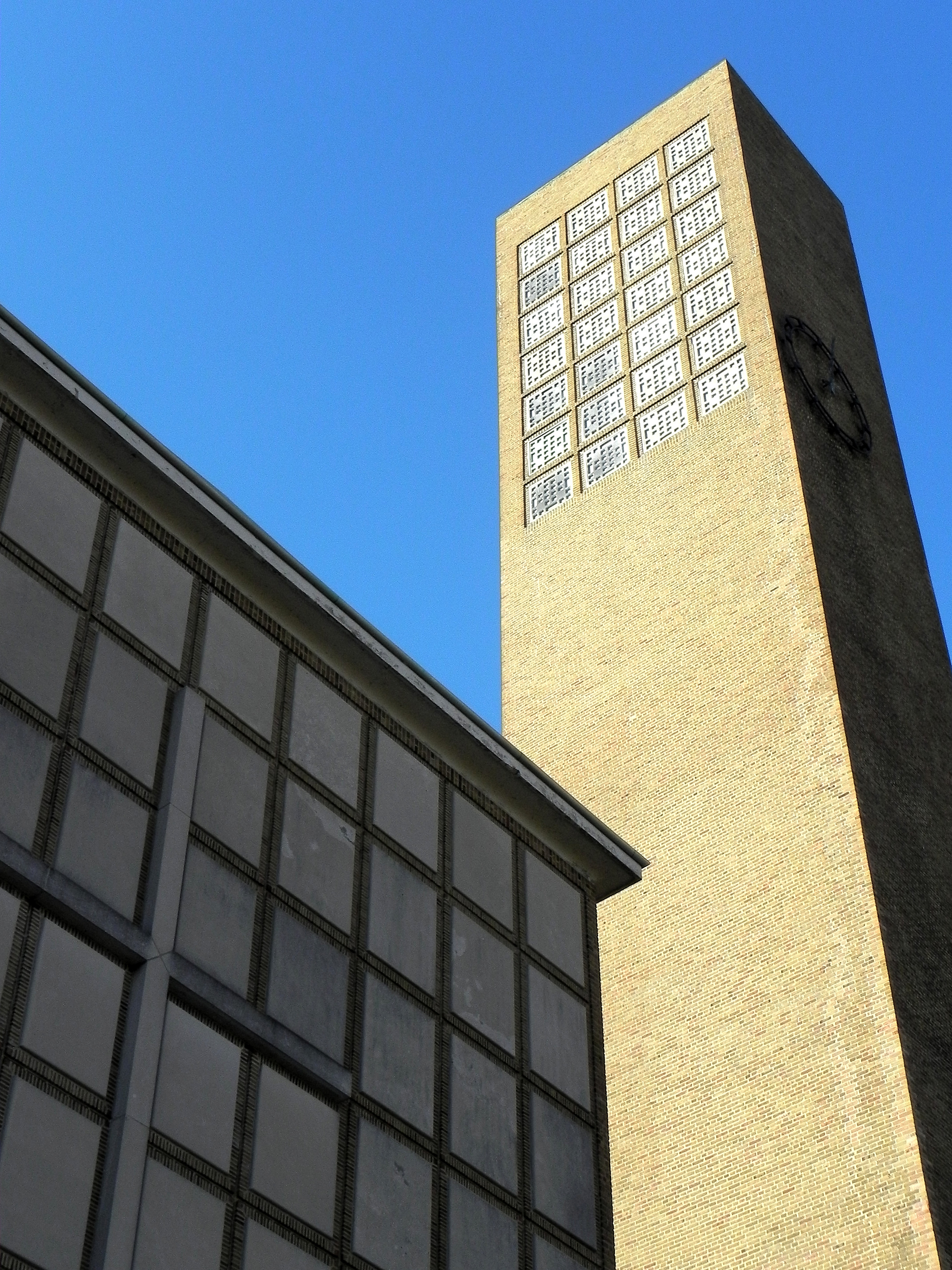
Perforations atop the tower, seen from next to the east wing

The tower, located west of the sanctuary, is an adaptation of a classical Italian campanile. was designed as a separate mass from the rest of the church, rising 166 feet (51 m) from the terrace. The base measures 17 by 23 feet (5.2 by 7.0 m) across. The tower abuts the site of the former reflecting pool; when the church was completed, this gave the impression that the tower was rising "straight out of the water", as the writer Albert Christ-Janer described it. The tower is designed in a simple, geometric form with plain brick walls; brick is the main material used in the tower, although concrete slabs are placed at regular intervals inside. The simple design of the tower was intended to create an impression of dignity and strength, and it was separated from the rest of the building to provide visual balance.

The western elevation of the tower contains a single bay of 20 square panels stacked atop each other, which is nicknamed the "Zipper". These panels start about 10 feet (3.0 m) above ground. The openings were originally constructed with grilles of precast concrete, which were infilled with brick. In the late 20th century, the openings were infilled with plastic panels that resembled the original grille design. The openings were replaced again in the 2020s with Indiana limestone panels.

On the top 40 feet (12 m) of each elevation, there are perforated panels, which surround a chamber from which the organ chimes are broadcast. Clock faces, measuring 10 feet (3.0 m) wide, are placed near the tower's pinnacle; they consist of clock hands and numerals made of metal. Inside are bells from congregation's previous buildings. Original plans called for a carillon atop the tower, but this was never finished. The space reserved for the carillon is delineated by the use of wider openwork grids atop the tower.

=== Interior ===
In general, the interior spaces are supported by steel beams or concrete girders, while the floors are made of concrete slabs. The design includes raw materials such as exposed wood and textured stone, which contrast with the building's modern architectural style. The interior has exposed-brick or plaster ceilings and walls for the most part; the brick used inside has a lighter hue than the bricks outside. As constructed, the floors were largely constructed of vinyl asbestos tiles and covered with carpets; the first story's main corridor has a Douglas fir floor, while other rooms have tongue and groove oak floors. The building's stairs have wooden balusters that run from floor to ceiling, passing through the floor slabs. The balusters are linked by horizontal steel rods, and there are handrails and lighting fixtures affixed to the balusters.

The interiors were described in The Wall Street Journal as having been decorated in an Arts and Crafts style. Charles Eames designed many of the interior decorations. The furnishings, executed in collaboration with Eero Saarinen, were meant specifically for the church. Wooden rods, similar to the staircase balusters, are used throughout the church's vestibule and sanctuary.

==== Vestibule ====
The east wing's main entrance leads to a vestibule, which is also labeled as the narthex. It has a floor made of waxed rectangular limestone pieces, pink-brick walls, and a ceiling that slants downward toward the sanctuary to the south. On the west wall is a cloakroom behind an oak screen, which has a counterpart. On the south wall are 3-inch-wide (7.6 cm) oak rods interspersed with translucent leadlights. The oak rods and leaded glass flank a series of wooden doors with leather handles and lozenge-shaped panes. Two pairs of doors lead directly into the sanctuary, while a third pair leads to the sanctuary's side aisle. The ceiling, located directly under the sanctuary's raked balcony, descends along the south wall. A staircase, with stone treads and wood-and-steel handrails, ascends to the balcony.

==== Sanctuary ====
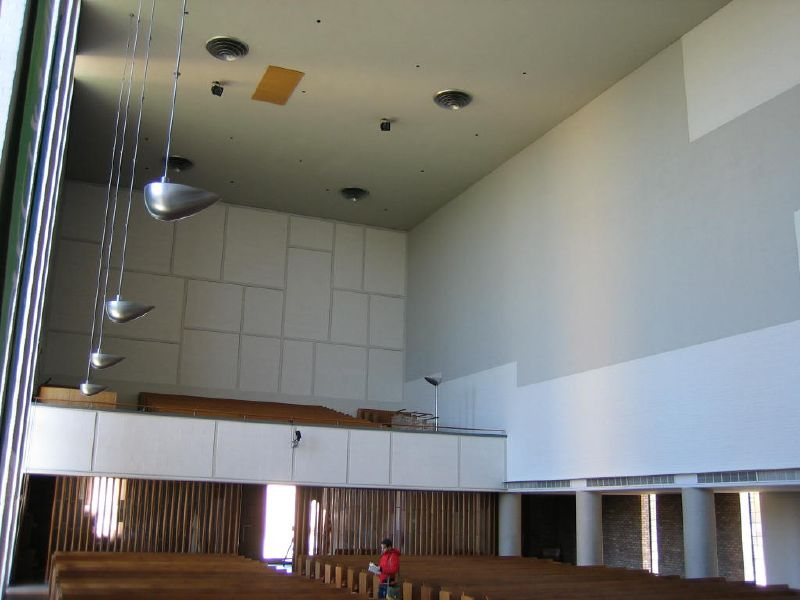
Looking northeast from the chancel. The rear or northern wall of the balcony is visible at left, while the eastern wall is visible at right.

The sanctuary measures 144 by 46 feet (44 by 14 m) across, with a height of 45 feet (14 m). It is arranged asymmetrically, with the main aisle placed slightly west of center. According to the Saarinens, any symmetrical layout would have been contrived, so they instead sought to "arrive at a good balance between the various features and points of interest of the room". The sanctuary is aligned on a north–south axis, and there is a balcony at the north end, above the vestibule. The main sanctuary seats 580 people; there is an additional rear gallery with 180 seats and a choir with 40 seats, for a total capacity of 800 individuals. Charles and Ray Eames's architectural practice designed the sanctuary's oak chairs, which later became the Eames Lounge Chair Wood and are upholstered with brown cushions. The main aisle has waxed-limestone floors, and the remainder of the sanctuary floor is made of waxed cork. The walls and ceilings are generally made of painted brick and plaster.

At ground level, the sanctuary's eastern wall has columns, behind which is an aisle; there is an air diffuser directly above the columns. Above the diffuser, the eastern wall is made of plaster and brick in an overlapping pattern. The northern wall of the ground level leads back to the vestibule. The balcony's northern wall has acoustic panels surrounded by brick frames, which are arranged in such a way that the panels appear inconspicuous. The western wall is illuminated by the large windows on the facade, which are interspersed with piers. The windows protrude slightly, and they have continuous vertical mullions, separated by discontinuous horizontal mullions. Asymmetrical bowl-shaped lamps hang from the ceiling in front of each pier. The ceiling itself is decorated in a similar pattern to the eastern wall, with diffusers and round, recessed lights.

Stone steps from the sanctuary ascend 4 feet (1.2 m) to a chancel with brick walls. A white cross is placed asymmetrically on the chancel's southern wall, illuminated by indirect lighting. The chancel's communion table is also arranged asymmetrically. The chancel has a baptistery with a font concealed behind a movable screen of oak rods. The baptistery is illuminated from the east by a tall window. The window, in turn, is concealed by a church organ screen made of wood rods, which is canted outward and has horizontal and vertical motifs that allude to the design of the window mullions. Eliel Saarinen intended the "perforated and light" screen as a contrast to the solid colors of the walls.

The choir area is on the chancel's western wall. Above the choir area is a tapestry designed by Eliel and his wife Loja Saarinen, which, upon the building's completion, was cited as the US's largest religious tapestry. Measuring 35 by 11.5 feet (10.7 by 3.5 m) across, it is woven with wool and flax. The tapestry depicts the Sermon on the Mount amid animals and listeners, along with geometric shapes and motifs. The church organ, made by the Aeolian-Skinner Organ Company, is housed in a chamber east of the chancel. The instrument, which was Aeolian-Skinner's last major pre–World War II organ, has 4,695 pipes ranging in length from 3/48 to 32 feet (0.019 to 9.754 m). The organ also has 4 manuals and pedals, 72 speaking stops, 61 harp bars, 25 chimes, and 73 other couplers and accessories. A pulpit, with a wood panel behind it, stands in front of the organ and conceals the organ console. Unlike the other design features, the pulpit is arranged symmetrically, protruding slightly from the chancel.

==== Other spaces ====
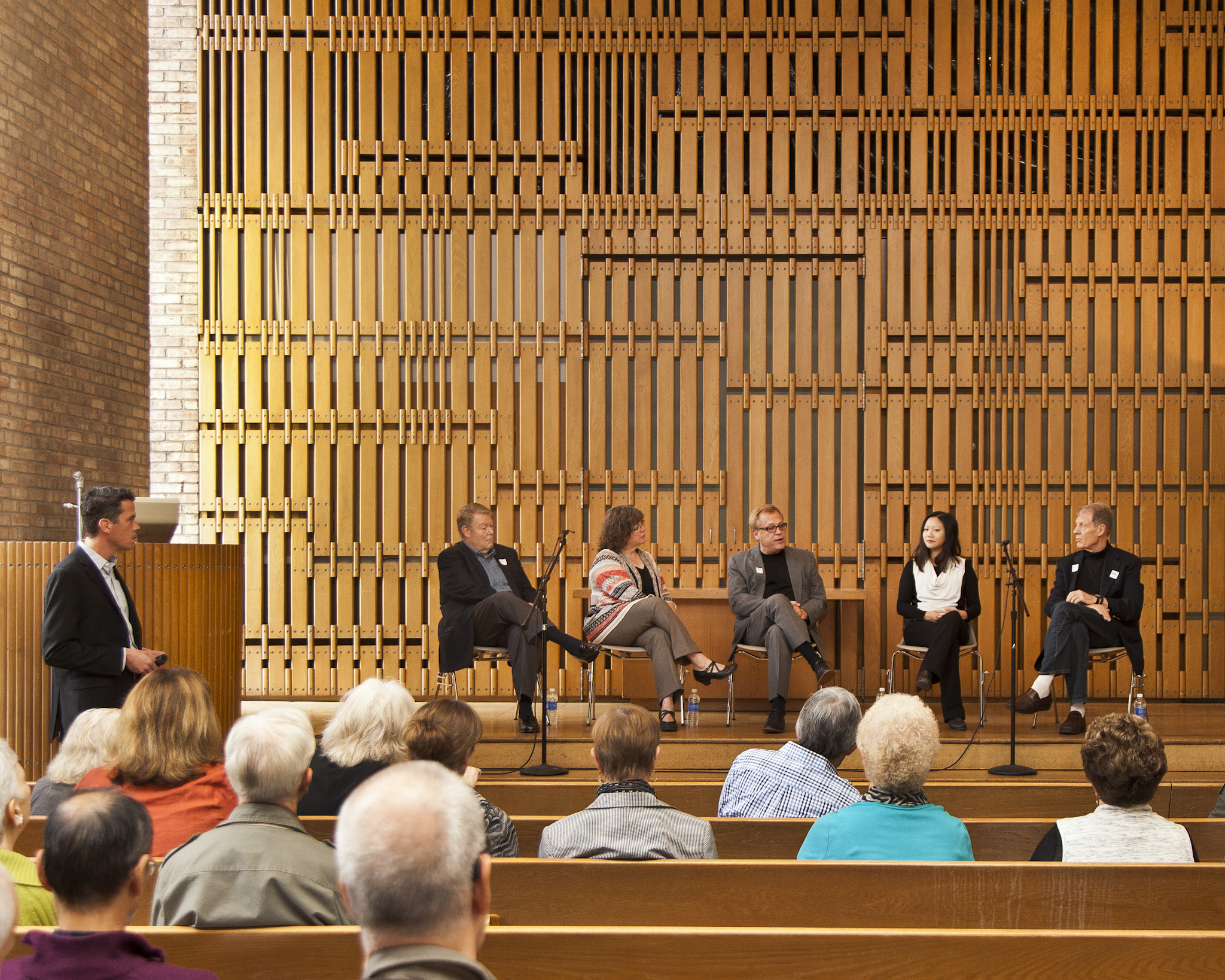
The interior of the church's chapel

South of the sanctuary is the chapel, separated from the sanctuary by a west–east corridor that continues across the bridge into the east wing's lobby. There are lobbies at either end of this corridor. The chapel itself features a similar asymmetrical layout to the sanctuary. Instead of a central aisle, there is a wide aisle on the west side and a narrow aisle on the eastern wall, illuminated by large windows. The aisle connects with a doorway at the western end of the northern wall, which in turn connects with the lobby corridor. The chapel generally has cork floors, leather-clad columns, a brick wall, and low ceilings. There is a screen of oak rods on the southern wall.

In the basement is an auditorium, which was intended to host events such as theatrical shows and dinners. The auditorium floor is slightly depressed beneath the rest of the basement. The entire room measures 92 by 46 feet (28 by 14 m) across by 12 feet (3.7 m) high, with 500 movable seats. The stage, located at the north end, is 32 feet (9.8 m) deep and has storage space for the seats. The auditorium's ceiling, and the rear wall of the stage, both undulate. Connected to the auditorium is a reception room, which is 24 by 60 feet (7.3 by 18.3 m) in size.

The kitchen is linked to the auditorium. The kitchen and pantry, spanning 900 square feet (84 m^{2}), is located on the east side of the east wing, arranged so that it does not interrupt church services and disturb the rest of the building. Also in the basement are the pastor's study, the secretary's office, a library, and a reception room. The reception room led directly from the courtyard and was used for meetings of the congregation's women's clubs. The classrooms in the bridge and west wing have movable seats and partitions. The second story has a movable partition that, when closed, separates a dressing room from the choirmaster's office; this space has a staircase leading directly to one side of the chancel.

== History ==
=== Background ===
The First Christian Church, a nondenominational Christian congregation, was originally part of the New Hope Church, which was formed in 1823 and functioned as a Baptist congregation for its first four years. In 1855, the congregation split from the New Hope Church. The congregation, originally known as the Christian Congregation in Columbus, initially had 60 congregants. The Christian Congregation's initial senior minister, Joseph Fassett, was succeeded by a half-dozen pastors over the next 17 years. (Note: In order: William Edmonston, William A. Washburn, Henry R. Pritchard, John B. Cobb, John Brazelton, and J. B. Crane. Crane was followed by Zachary Taylor Sweeney.) Zachary Taylor Sweeney took over as the pastor in 1872, serving for 26 years; during his tenure, the congregation more than tripled from 300 to 1,000 people. When the congregation relocated in either 1878 or 1879, the members renamed themselves as the Tabernacle Church of Christ. The new site, later the Cleo Rogers Memorial Library, remained the congregation's home for more than six decades and, according to The Republic, was commonly described as "one of the most handsome church edifices in southern Indiana". The church building underwent three renovations in the next half-century, including the addition of a rear annex.

After Z. T. Sweeney resigned in 1898, E. B. Scofield served briefly. E. Burdette Widger took over as pastor for a few months in 1899; a dispute prompted Widger and half the congregants to form a new congregation, the Central Christian Church. Widger's congregation disbanded after two decades, following which many of its members went back to the Tabernacle Church of Christ. Back at the Tabernacle Church, A. J. Frank served until 1902, and was succeeded by Harvey H. Harmon, who resigned in early 1905. William Henry Book became pastor later that year. During Book's two-decade tenure, congregant Marshall T. Reeves established a system of evangelist districts across Indiana in 1913, and several congregants established a charitable fund, the Christian Foundation, in 1921.

Following Book's retirement in 1925, Martin B. Miller took over for a brief period. When Z. T. Sweeney died in 1926, his funeral at the church attracted widespread notice across southern Indiana, and a plaque honoring him (later reinstalled in the current church building) was dedicated at there. William E. Sweeney, a great-nephew of Z. T. Sweeney, was appointed as the new pastor in early 1929, and the congregation celebrated the 50th anniversary of the old Tabernacle Church building that year. Thomas K. Smith took over as the congregation's senior pastor in 1930, at which point there were about 1,000 congregants. Smith grew the congregation by 2,160 members over the two following decades by, among other things, adding a women's council and rescheduling prayer times to allow young members to attend both Sunday services and Bible school. By the late 1930s, when there were 1,500 members, the congregation could no longer fit in the 1870s building.

=== Development ===
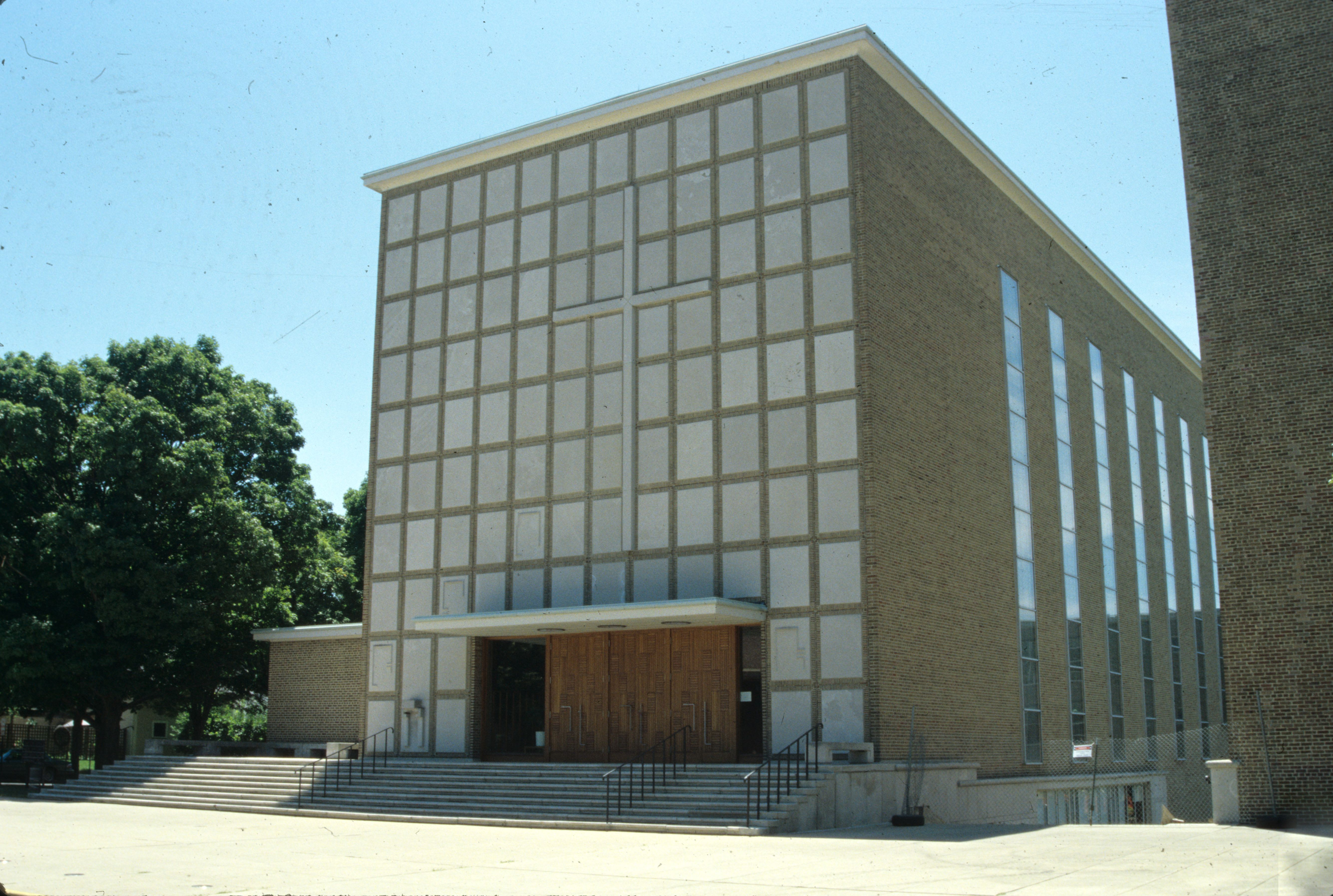
The church, viewed from slightly to the west

With the congregation growing again, Smith published an annual report in 1936, in which he highlighted the need for another church building. Railroad Square, a nearby tract of parkland that had housed a railroad depot until 1909, was acquired on the congregation's behalf by two siblings, William G. Irwin and Linnie I. Sweeney, the latter of whom was Z. T. Sweeney's widow. Irwin and Linnie Sweeney lived nearby and were among the congregation's most prominent families, which also included the related Miller family. The congregation considered several other sites, some away from downtown Columbus, but ultimately decided upon Railroad Square due to its central location downtown. Irwin and Linnie Sweeney offered the site to the congregation on May 31, 1936.

==== Planning ====
Linnie Sweeney and Irwin first wanted to develop a Gothic or Early American church building, hiring E. B. Gilchrist to design a more traditionally styled structure. Gilchrist was forced to withdraw from the project for personal reasons, and church elders recommended the modernist architects Eliel Saarinen and Frank Lloyd Wright. The elders ultimately selected Saarinen, who (along with his wife Loja) was then employed at Cranbrook Educational Community in Michigan; their son Eero worked with his father's architecture firm. The businessman J. Irwin Miller, Sweeney's grandson, was involved with the design process. Although Miller and Eero Saarinen are sometimes cited as having met each other at Yale University, in reality they did not meet and become friends until Eliel received the Tabernacle Church commission. Sources disagree on whether J. Irwin Miller or his mother Nettie Sweeney (Note: Nettie Sweeney is sometimes referred to as "Mrs. Hugh Miller".) (the chairperson of the church's building committee) had suggested hiring the Saarinens' firm.

Nettie and her sister Elsie traveled to Cranbrook to speak with Saarinen. J. Irwin Miller reportedly claimed to be confident that Saarinen would design a "great building", even if it were a design Miller did not like. Eliel Saarinen was originally reluctant to take the commission, particularly if the building were to have a lavish design, and declined the initial commission. He disliked overly indulgent and theatrical churches and particularly did not want to design a church in a more traditional style. Additionally, Eliel had built only one church before, in the Baltics, and he was apprehensive about the project until he heard the proposal for the building:

Our town is small and there are all sorts and conditions of men. While we should like the church to be beautiful, we do not want the first reaction to be, how much did the church cost. We want the poorest women in town to feel at home there and able to worship her God in those surroundings.

— Nettie Sweeney Miller,

The Sweeney sisters also wanted the church to feel welcoming while also commanding reverence and being "timeless". Saarinen eventually agreed to design the building after some persuasion, imposing a condition that he be given carte blanche over the style. The congregation wanted a building with four sections—a west wing, an east wing, a connecting footbridge, and a freestanding tower—all of which were included in the final design. According to the congregation, this massing plan would "achieve a satisfactory balance of masses, and a lively, yet restful, skyline". The building committee wanted the design to clearly convey its function as a "House of God", telling the Saarinens to "build a church which will interpret the spirit of Christ and of the gospel and which will also promote these ideals and assure their perpetuation among us". As such, the committee required that the building emphasize certain events important to the congregation's faith, including the resurrection of Jesus.

==== Construction and opening ====
Charles R. Wermuth of Fort Wayne, Indiana, was hired to construct the new church, for which site-clearing began in July 1940, although a building permit was not immediately issued. Workers had difficulty demolishing a concrete and steel fountain within the old park. The foundation and central courtyard of the church were underway by November, and the campanile's brickwork had risen above sidewalk level. By early 1941, the building was estimated to cost $500,000 or $600,000. Time magazine wrote that the design was actually cheaper than that of a similarly sized Gothic-style building, which would cost about 30% more. William G. Irwin had promised to cover all the debts for the new building.

Wermuth typically employed 80 to 100 workers at a time on the project, employing a maximum of 107 people in mid-1941. The tower was more than half complete by February 1941. At that point, the foundations for the rest of the church were under construction. Sweeney and Irwin attended the cornerstone-laying ceremony on April 20, 1941. The cornerstone ceremony attracted 1,500 people; a writer for The Republic later stated that the design had been "accepted, some might say even embraced" by congregants despite its unconventional nature. According to The Republic, the church differed so drastically from typical building designs that passersby often asked what it was. The final pieces of the east wing's roof were being installed by July 1941, at which point most brickwork and all steel doorways and window frames had been installed; the facade was substantially completed by that September. The entire building was completed in early 1942, and the congregation became the Christian Church around the time.

Eliel Saarinen inspected the church on May 4, 1942, approving the work and turning ownership to the congregation's building committee. The first meetings in the new building took place two days later on May 6, and one of the building's first baptisms took place on May 11, when Smith decided to give a rare weekday baptism to a local soldier on furlough. The new building was dedicated on May 31, 1942. The building's first-ever Sunday-morning service had recorded 1,200 attendees, and The Columbus Herald wrote that another 3,500 persons visited throughout the day. The building was cited as having cost $700,000 or $750,000. The congregation had no outstanding debt because the construction cost was fully covered; according to Newsweek, the congregation had raised $200,000, while Irwin and Sweeney paid $550,000. The building's completion came just before World War II–era material restrictions took effect.

=== 1940s and 1950s ===
From the beginning, the new church building had attracted visitors from afar, in part because of its unconventional design, and the library across the street collected literature about the building. The church recorded at least 10,000 visitors in the new building's first six weeks, and the building quickly began hosting congregational activities and social clubs. The church's organ was dedicated on June 21, 1942. On the first anniversary of the church building's dedication, Smith rededicated the edifice with a special service. The congregation's size was increasing at the time, despite more than a hundred congregants having departed to serve in the United States Armed Forces during World War II. The new church building's tower had exhibited signs of cracking as early as 1945; this necessitated a series of repairs, which continued for more than two decades.

Furnishings from the congregation's old building were donated to other Indiana churches in 1946, and the old structure was demolished starting in early June 1947. During the old structure's demolition, the basement was destroyed in a fire; the last piece of that building was removed two months after demolition had started. Pieces of the old church's windows were salvaged and reused in a new building for the Free Methodist Church. Forty-three former members of the Tabernacle Church of Christ departed in 1955 to form a new congregation, the North Christian Church, citing ideological disagreements.

The Tabernacle Church of Christ was formally renamed the First Christian Church in 1957, and work on a new youth center for the church began that June. The youth center, located at Fourth Street and Lafayette Avenue, cost $350,000 and was designed by McQuire & Shook, Compton, Richey & Associates, with a similar brick facade to the Saarinens' church building. That structure was dedicated on September 28, 1958, with an open house that attracted over a thousand attendees.

=== 1960s to mid-1990s ===
As part of a plan to construct the Cleo Rogers Memorial Library across Fifth Street, the city government approved a proposal to close part of the neighboring Lafayette Avenue in June 1964. The First Christian Church's congregation had opposed the move, claiming that it would make it more difficult to access the church. Thomas K. Smith retired at the end of 1964, having ultimately served the congregation for 35 years (including 23 at the Saarinen building). He was succeeded by Ard Hoven, who assumed the pulpit early the next year. The openings in the campanile were sealed in 1974 after the tower continued to deteriorate. Harold T. Armstrong, who was first employed in 1978 as the congregation's associate pastor, was promoted to senior pastor that September after Hoven resigned. Also in the late 1970s, the church began hosting a combined Bible study and breakfast for members of multiple denominations, and it also launched a noontime music recital series.

When Armstrong joined, the congregation had 2,100 members. During his tenure, Armstrong and his wife established men's and women's Bible study groups, and Armstrong officiated at hundreds of members' births and marriages, along with attending 700 members' funerals. Armstrong said in 1986 that the congregation had seen nearly-consistent growth through the decade, except for a decline in 1985 due to local economic troubles. The church building was also a popular stop for tour groups. The chancel tapestry was temporarily removed for restoration in 1991. The next year, the congregation hosted an event to celebrate the building's semicentennial, inviting all 3,349 people who had ever been baptized in the building. A family Bible school was also established at the church in 1995. Armstrong ultimately left the congregation in 1996 and was succeeded by Mark Jones.

=== 1990s and 2000s expansion ===
The First Christian Church's congregation planned an expansion in the 1990s. Initially, the congregation wanted to expand Saarinen's building, but this proposal was dropped due to backlash. The congregation also considered building a tunnel under Fourth Street, which would connect with the church's youth center to the south, or closing Lafayette Avenue to the east, which would permit an expansion there. In February 1999, the First Christian Church proposed closing one block of Fourth Street and connecting the youth center and the church building. By then, the congregation had 1,000 members and was expanding. After the Columbus Plan Commission rejected the proposal, a city councilman suggested rerouting Fourth Street south of the youth center.

The congregation ultimately withdrew their proposal to close Fourth Street. Three options were proposed that April: relocating the congregation, constructing an expansion on the same block, or constructing a new building on another block nearby. Nolan Bingham, a local architect, drew up plans for an expansion of the existing building, which were complete in late 1999. The plans called for a three-story classroom structure on the existing site, adjoining the southern end of the courtyard, for about $3 million. Work proceeded slowly over the next year. Thomas Wood & Associates oversaw a renovation of the existing church. The congregation held an art show to celebrate the expansion's completion in September 2002.

=== Mid-2000s to present ===
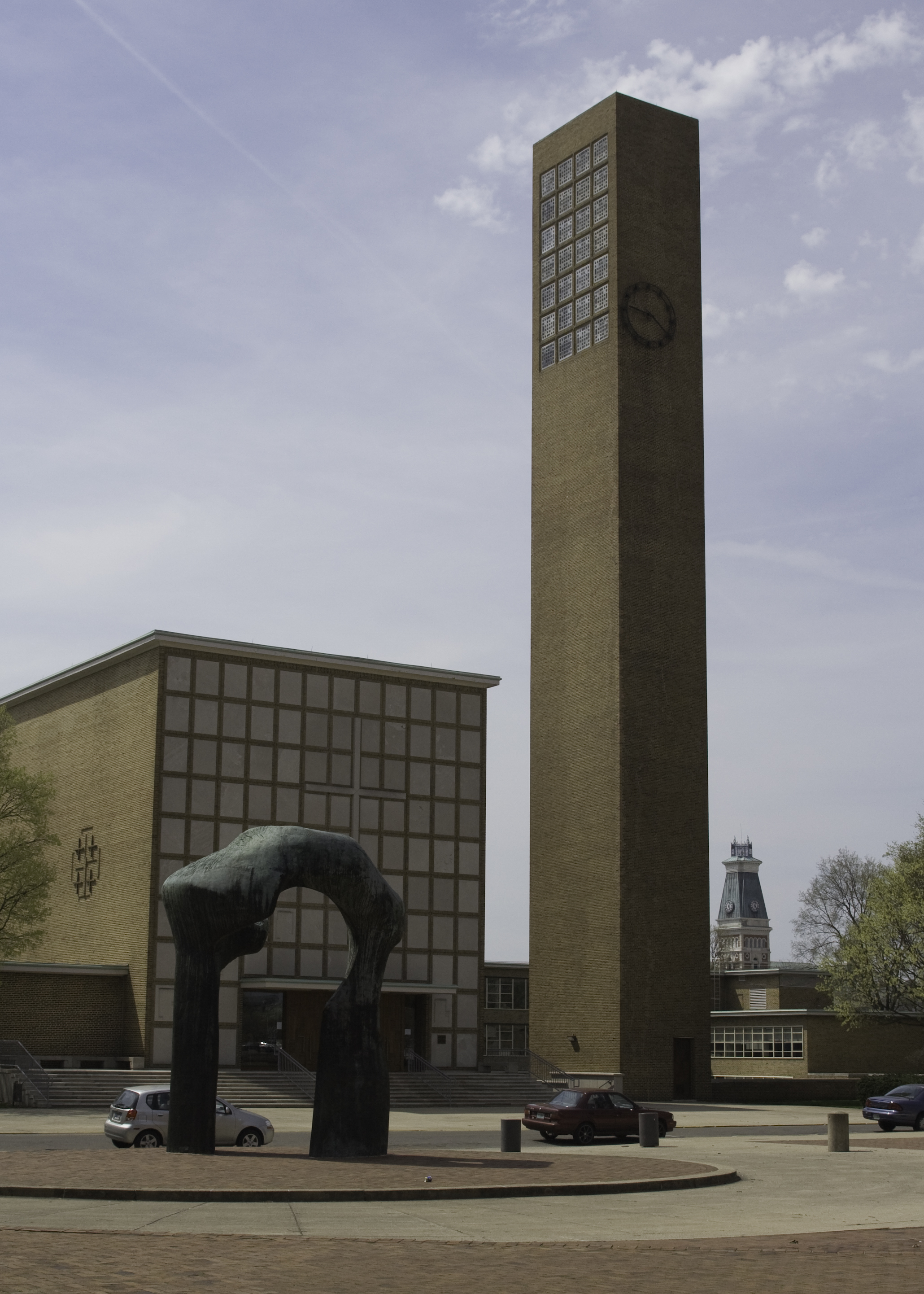
The tower (center right) was repaired in 2022–2023.

For the congregation's 150th anniversary in 2005, a bell from one of the congregation's former locations was restored and dedicated. The church building was used in 2014 for a site-specific artwork, 100 Variations by Jonathan Nesci; as part of the installation, one hundred mirrors were temporarily installed in the church's lawn. Justin K. White served as the congregation's senior minister until early 2017, when he resigned after facing criminal charges. He was replaced that July by Steve Yeaton, the son of a former associate minister. Also in 2017, as part of the Exhibit Columbus biannual art showcase, Studio Indigenous created the Wiikiaami pavilion, a wigwam displayed on the grounds of the First Christian Church.

The tower again began showing serious cracks in 2018, and the church began raising funds to fix the tower that year. The congregation also commissioned a report on the tower's structural condition. Preservationists and residents raised over $3 million for repairs, obtaining grants of $500,000 each from the National Park Service and the Save America's Treasures program, and $250,000 from the National Fund for Sacred Places.

Louis Joyner was hired to design a restoration of the tower, which began in 2022. Workers initially repaired the carillon in the tower's upper section, which included rebuilding the west and east elevations, replacing the carillon's square openings, and repairing the north and south elevations' brick veneers. Afterward, workers sealed the cistern inside, repaired the water-damaged interiors, added a ventilation system, and restored architectural details. The congregation hosted an event celebrating the tower's restoration in 2023, following eight months of work. Joyner received a preservation award for the project, and the restoration was also nominated for a Docomomo International preservation award in 2025. As of 2024, Yeaton remained the congregation's senior minister.

== Impact ==
=== Reception ===
When the church building was being designed, Time magazine published a full-page feature on the structure, writing that "perhaps its sheer 166-foot tower will beacon religious architecture back into the advancing stream of history". Newsweek said that the building's blocky, rectangular design is "utterly unlike the seventeen other churches in Columbus or, for that matter, in almost any other city in the world". After the building's completion, the Associated Press wrote that the tower's presence "redeems the flat roof of the rest of the edifice". Thomas K. Smith, who was pastor at the time of the new building's development, later recalled that he felt "the architect expressed our objectives very well in the design of the church" and that it had helped attract worshippers, despite some lingering objections to the design.

Decades after the building's completion, writers continued to praise the building as appearing modern, while others describe it as austere yet well-detailed. The Morning News of Delaware called the church's style as being "long before its time". John M. Jacobus Jr., an art professor at Indiana University, said in 1969 that he considered the building "probably one of the finest churches of the twentieth century" and one of Eliel Saarinen's masterpieces, though Jacobus liked the main sanctuary more than the auditorium. A writer for the Courier Journal said that the materials, the sanctuary's spacious feeling, and the light fixtures contributed to the ambiance. Detroit Free Press described the austerity and the high ceiling as befitting the congregation's "fundamentalist doctrine". In the 1980s, The Wall Street Journal cited the gridded facade, plain interior, and flat roof as having combined to create a "splendid" design, and The Washington Post wrote that the tower and the high sanctuary ceiling helped make the church structure a "big, dignified building". In 1996, the Post-Bulletin wrote that the uniqueness of the design had "delighted many of the parishioners, but it shocked almost as many others". House Beautiful wrote two years later that the church's design had held up well over the years, evoking both the past and future.

In 2000, Douglas Wissing of the Los Angeles Times wrote that the simple design of the First Christian Church was "an elegant, wholly unsteeple-like expression of unalloyed piety". A writer for the Financial Times, in 2002, called the building "perhaps the greatest example of Scandinavian modernism outside Scandinavia itself". The architectural writer Robert Campbell stated that the building was still "the best in town", despite viewing its modifications negatively, while another writer for The Tennessean said the church was evidence of "how Columbus' architectural heritage started and continued". The critic Michael J. Lewis of The Wall Street Journal wrote in 2024 that the church was "one of the hidden jewels of American modernism" and said that the tower itself was prominent in Columbus's skyline. Observers in the 21st century continued to write about the church building's austere and boxy look.

=== Architectural influence and media ===
The First Christian Church building was among the United States' first modernist church buildings. It was also Eero Saarinen's first project in Columbus; after the First Christian Church was completed, he became close associates with Miller. Eero eventually designed four buildings with Miller's involvement—the Miller family's Ontario summer cottage, the Irwin Conference Center, the Miller family's primary residence, and the North Christian Church. All of these, except the Ontario cottage, were located in Columbus. As for Eliel, although he never designed another building in Columbus, his later projects used several elements from the First Christian Church. For example, his designs for an unbuilt Ohio church and Christ Church Lutheran in Minneapolis used contrasting masonry patterns, and many of Eliel's later works incorporated perforated screens. Despite serving a different denomination, the Christ Church Lutheran was particularly similar to the First Christian Church, with an asymmetrical layout, walls in muted colors, and windows on one side.

In 1956, the First Christian Church building and over a dozen other churches nationwide received an excellence award from the National Council of Churches' architecture commission, ranking behind the Christ Church Lutheran. The church building has been featured in exhibits about the Saarinens' work, including a 1990 exhibit hosted by the Indianapolis Museum of Art. Upon the building's 50th anniversary in 1992, the congregation published a commemorative booklet about the building's and congregation's history. The building was also depicted in a 1967 photoshoot taken by Life magazine, and it was featured in Columbus, a 2017 film set in the city.

==== Effect on modernist architecture in Columbus ====
The church building was retrospectively described as Columbus's first modern-style building and, for more than a decade, was the city's only building designed in that style. It was the first time a nationally known designer, rather than a local architect, had been hired to design a structure in Columbus. At least 60 modernist buildings were constructed across Columbus in subsequent years, although most of these were not constructed until after the late 1950s, when J. Irwin Miller offered to pay the design fees for the city's modernist public buildings. Dialogue wrote that the church was "ironically unimposing" compared to the buildings it inspired, and Blair Kamin of the Chicago Tribune said that several churches that had followed the First Christian Church's lead. One scholar in 2024 described the First Christian Church as "a deceptively simple geometric design" that, in later years, encapsulated the "spirit of Columbus".

Several sources compared the First Christian Church with the later North Christian Church. Wolf Von Eckardt wrote that the churches were "two pinnacles in the uncertain architecture of our time" and that, despite their vastly different shapes, the churches were built in the same spirit. He later wrote that the building was "pure reason" compared to the North Christian Church, whose design had been "pure emotion". The Wall Street Journal wrote in 1970 that the First Christian Church was just as "eye-catching" as the North Christian Church, and Paul Goldberger said the older church had a more "convincing" design. Church History magazine wrote that the First Christian Church "goes more than halfway toward the then-regnant aesthetic of Modernism in its absence of applied ornament and clean geometric shapes" and that the North Christian Church design went even further.

=== Landmark designations ===
In early 2000, the First Christian Church and five other modernist structures in Columbus were nominated for designation as National Historic Landmarks (NHLs), which would add them to the National Register of Historic Places (NRHP). The United States Department of the Interior designated four of these buildings as landmarks that May; the designations of the McDowell Adult Education Center and First Christian Church were delayed until January 2001. This was the first time in US history that several buildings were simultaneously designated as NHLs before turning 50 years old, the minimum age required for most buildings to be listed on the NRHP; the six listings, except the First Christian Church, were all built after 1950. The designation allowed the building to qualify for federal preservation funds. The landmark nominations themselves received national media attention, in part because very few NRHP sites were designated as NHLs, let alone multiple sites in such a small area. A plaque commemorating the designation was dedicated in June 2001.

The First Christian Church is also a contributing property to the Columbus Historic District, where it is labeled as an "outstanding property". The district was added to the NRHP on December 10, 1982.

== See also ==
- List of works by Eero Saarinen
- List of National Historic Landmarks in Indiana
- National Register of Historic Places listings in Bartholomew County, Indiana
