= The Republic Newspaper Office =

Building in Columbus, Indiana, US

- The Republic
- U.S. National Register of Historic Places
- U.S. National Historic Landmark
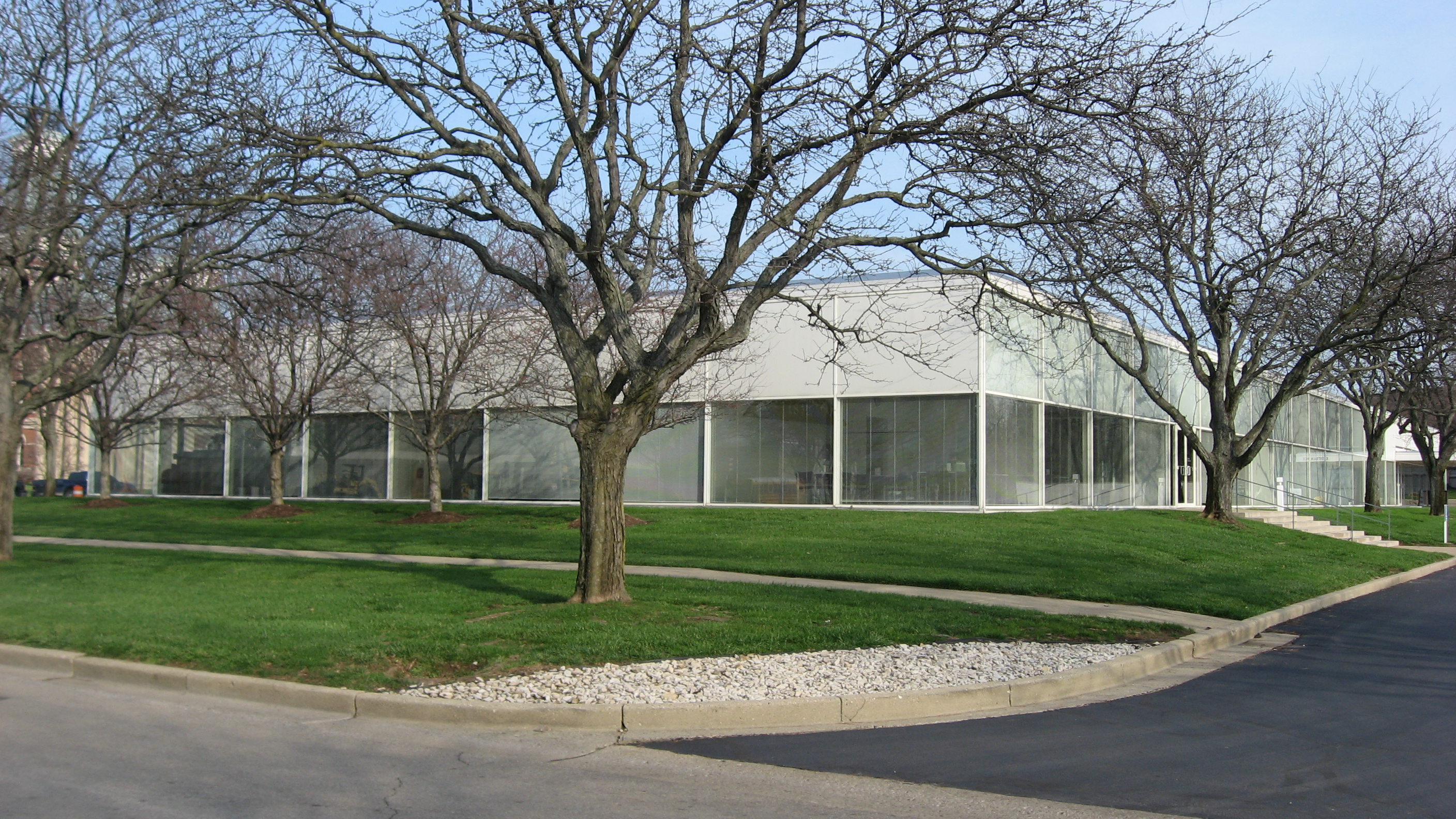
- The western and southern facade of the building

- Location within Bartholomew County, Indiana Location within Indiana Location within the United States
- Location: 333 Second St., Columbus, Indiana
- Coordinates: 39°12′0″N 85°55′18″W
- Area: 2.2 acres (96,000 ft^{2}; 0.89 ha)
- Built: 1969–1971
- Architect: Myron Goldsmith of Skidmore, Owings, & Merrill
- Architectural style: Modern
- NRHP reference No.: 12001015

Significant dates
- Added to NRHP: October 16, 2012
- Designated NHL: October 16, 2012

The Republic Newspaper Office is a modernist building at 333 Second Street in Columbus, Indiana, United States. Designed by Myron Goldsmith of the firm Skidmore, Owings, & Merrill (SOM), it was built for the local newspaper The Republic between 1969 and 1971. The Republic building, one of several modernist corporate buildings developed in Columbus during the late 20th century, has been owned by Indiana University (IU) since 2018. The building has received awards and praise for its architecture over the years, and it is designated as a National Historic Landmark.

The one-story structure has a thin curtain wall made of steel and glass, topped by a flat roof. Aluminum mullions divide the facade both vertically and horizontally, and they correspond to a grid around which the entire interior is arranged. The first floor's original layout accommodated the different stages of the newspaper production process from west to east. The interiors included offices, two work rooms, meeting space, and a printing plant, along with storage space in the basement. Unusually for its smaller buildings, SOM handled the interior design; The Republic also displayed pieces from its art collection there. The landscaping around the building includes rows of honey locust trees and clusters of crabapple trees.

The Republic's owner Robert N. Brown selected Goldsmith to design a new building for the paper in 1959, though construction was postponed. The building was constructed in conjunction with a 1960s master plan for downtown Columbus, opening on July 19, 1971. After completion, the Republic building underwent relatively few changes; the printing press was removed from the building in 1997. After the rest of the newspaper's offices relocated in 2016, Southeastern Indiana Medical Holdings acquired the building. It was resold in April 2018 to IU, which relocated its Master of Architecture program there that August.

== Site ==
The Republic Newspaper Office building is located at 333 Second Street in Columbus, Indiana, United States. It is the only building on an approximately 2.2-acre (96,000 ft^{2}; 0.89 ha) city block bounded by Second Street (Indiana State Road 46 eastbound) to the north, Washington Street to the east, First Street to the south, and Jackson Street to the west. There are sidewalks on all four streets. The sidewalk on Second Street is flanked by evenly-spaced rows of honey locust trees on both sides, while the sidewalks on Jackson and Washington streets have rows of honey locust trees only on the side facing the curb. The building is set back 55 feet (17 m) from its primary frontage on Second Street, where there are two flagpoles. The rear or south end of the block contains a parking lot, which stretches between Jackson and Washington streets and contains 108, 112, or 115 spaces. There are also crabapple trees at the building's west and east ends, as well as randomly arranged honey locusts at the south end.

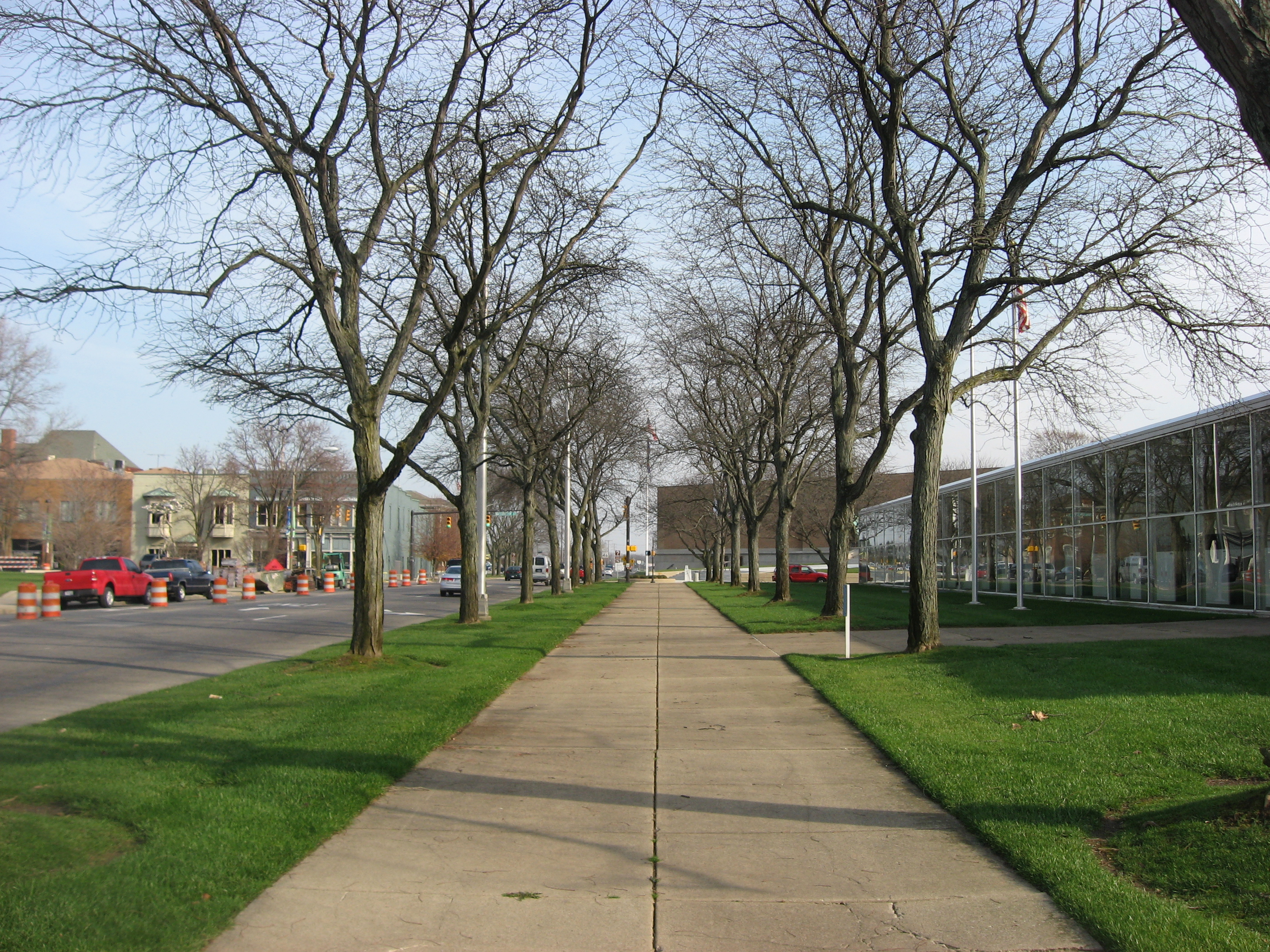
Streetscape along Second Street

The building is located at the south end of Columbus's downtown, which mostly consists of low-rise commercial buildings from the late 19th and early 20th centuries. To the north, the building faces the Bartholomew County Courthouse across Second Street. It is also close to other structures such as the Irwin Bank Building and Columbus City Hall. The sidewalk on Second Street is part of a longer pathway leading to the Flatrock River, built in the late 20th century as part of an urban renewal project for Columbus.

== Architecture ==
The Republic building was designed by Myron Goldsmith, an architect at the firm Skidmore, Owings, & Merrill (SOM), as the headquarters of local newspaper The Republic. It is one of seven buildings in Columbus designated as National Historic Landmarks. The others are the Irwin Bank Building, the Mabel McDowell Adult Education Center, the Miller House, the North Christian Church, the First Christian Church, and the First Baptist Church. The Republic building was also one of several modernist corporate buildings developed in Columbus during the late 20th century. These structures followed an earlier wave of modernist development in the mid-20th century, influenced by local businessman J. Irwin Miller, whose Cummins Foundation had paid the design fees for modernist government buildings in the city.

It has one story and a basement. The building has a rectangular floor plan measuring 248 by 93 feet (76 by 28 m). The floor plan is arranged in a 3×8 grid of square modules measuring 31 feet (9.4 m) across; the modules at the building's perimeter are further subdivided into three equal sections measuring 10 1/3 feet (3.1 m) wide. Vertically, the building is divided into modules measuring 7 1/2 feet (2.3 m) high; the flat roof is 15 feet (4.6 m), or two modules, above ground. These modules influenced both the exterior and interior design. The building's low-rise design was also intended to avoid overshadowing the nearby Bartholomew County Courthouse.

=== Facade ===
The facade is made mostly of steel and glass. Aluminum mullions divide the facade both vertically into bays and horizontally into registers, which correspond to the interior modules. The vertical mullions double as load-bearing columns that support the roof. The northern and southern elevations are divided vertically into 24 bays, while the western and eastern elevations are divided vertically into 9 bays, corresponding to the 10 1/3-foot-wide (3.1 m) sections at the building's perimeter. The facade has painted steel panels at the bottom—concealing the first story's concrete floor slab, which is raised slightly above ground—and at the top. The roof slab is a metal deck measuring 3 inches (76 mm) thick. The roof functions as a diaphragm, distributing structural forces laterally to the building's perimeter; this eliminated the need for thick structural reinforcement at the parapet and allowed the facade to be designed as a thin curtain wall.

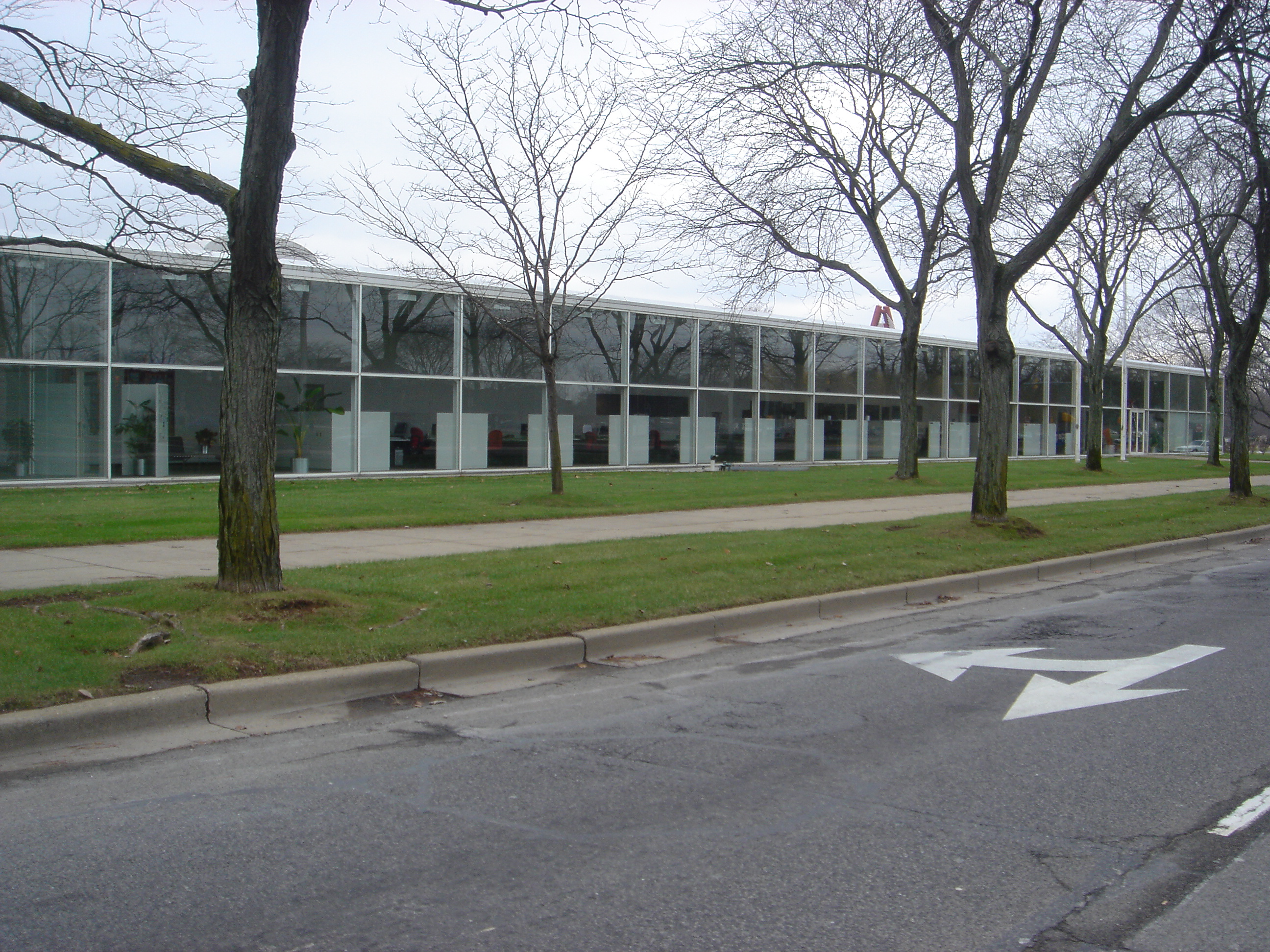
The upper and lower registers of the facade, seen from Second Street; the entrance is at the far right

The facade itself is made primarily of glass measuring 1/4 inch (6.4 mm) thick, with aluminum panels installed in some bays for insulation. The glass is polished and was manufactured by PPG Industries. The glass exterior originally allowed the newspaper's bright yellow printing press to be viewed from the nearby street. The Architectural Record wrote that "considerable thought" was given to the decision to use glass, since newspaper offices were frequently targeted by threats, but that The Republic's owner Robert N. Brown ultimately decided to use glass because he trusted the local population. Goldsmith used single-layered windows because he thought that thicker glass sheets would be less transparent. The curtain wall is similar to that of the earlier Irwin Bank Building. aside from the aluminum panels.

All of the bays on the northern elevation of the facade are identical, except for the fifth-westernmost bay, which contains a set of double doors. On the southern elevation, the fifth-westernmost bay has another door accessed by limestone steps, while three of the eastern bays contain a loading dock covered by a canopy. On both the eastern and western elevations, as well as the seven easternmost bays of the southern elevation, the upper register of the facade has aluminum panels. The lower register on all four elevations, and the rest of the upper register on the northern and southern elevations, are made of glass. The gray panels were intended to complement the color scheme of storefronts in downtown Columbus designed by Alexander Girard. Just east of the building is a white-brick enclosure measuring about 7 feet (2.1 m) high, which includes a cooling tower and garbage disposal.

=== Interior ===
When the building was completed, SOM cited the first floor as spanning approximately 23,000 square feet (2,100 m^{2}) and the basement as covering 10,300 square feet (960 m^{2}). The American Press and a 1971 article in The Republic both described the building as spanning 33,419 square feet (3,104.7 m^{2}) in total. According to The Republic, this was split across 23,064 square feet (2,142.7 m^{2}) on the first floor and 10,355 square feet (962.0 m^{2}) in the basement.

==== Rooms ====
The first floor's original layout accommodated the different stages of the newspaper production process, proceeding roughly linearly from west to east. The first-floor spaces are divided by full-height glass walls. The walls are held in place by columns with "H"-shaped cross sections, placed every 10 1/3 feet (3.1 m), which correspond to the modules at the perimeter of the building. These columns support a corrugated steel ceiling deck with fluorescent lights, pipes, and sprinklers. All four elevations of the building, except the central 16 bays on the northern elevation, have miniature metal blinds. The concrete floor slab was covered with a dark brown carpet. A gas boiler provided hot air, while a gas engine powered two compressors that provided cool air. Grilles and diffusers along the perimeter walls distributed air through the building.

The administrative offices, cafeteria, and accounting department were at the western end of the building, where the entrances on the north and south walls lead into enclosed glass vestibules. These lead to reception areas originally furnished with Barcelona chairs and tables. The reception desk was made of metal and had an oak desktop. Abutting the reception areas, in the center-west portions of the building, were a pair of work areas facing north and south, which respectively housed newsrooms for The Republic's advertising and editorial sections. A low, wide hallway leads between the work areas, with full-height doors on either side leading to various offices, bathrooms, and other spaces. The northern work area had cubicles with wooden partitions and oak-topped metal drawers. The partitions contained storage spaces, and the drawers could be rearranged. The southern work area, originally had wood-top desks, which were replaced while The Republic still occupied the building.

Proceeding east from the two work areas, advertising and editorial copy were reviewed by separate departments on opposite sides of the building. The center-east section had additional offices and conference rooms, while the eastern end of the building contained the actual printing plant. The publisher's office had teak floors with Moroccan carpet; a travertine shelf; and a wall with desk, cabinets, and lighting. The general manager's office had teak-framed chairs, a teak desk, and a travertine credenza. The printing press was painted yellow, to draw passersby's attention, and could print up to forty thousand 28-page issues per hour. To reduce noise and vibrations from the printing press, it was placed behind a soundproof glass wall and rested on footings that were disconnected from the rest of the building's foundation. When the printing press was removed in 1997, the wall was relocated, and the former printing press space became offices. After Indiana University (IU) acquired the building in 2016, the interior was converted into studios, classrooms, offices, conference rooms, an auditorium, and metalwork and woodwork shops.

The basement, occupying the building's eastern half, has utilitarian concrete walls and columns. It was originally used for mechanical functions and storage, a function it retained in the 21st century. The entire building sits on a concrete foundation.

==== Art ====
SOM designed the interior decorations and furnishings, a deviation from its custom of overseeing interior designs only for their larger buildings. The interiors were mostly decorated in neutral colors, with accents in bright hues of primary colors. When The Republic occupied the building, it also maintained a small art collection there. The spaces were decorated with a Herbert Bayer oil painting, prints by various artists, and a section of cornice from the newspaper's previous headquarters. A woodcut by Carol Summers and a silk print by Victor Vasarely were also displayed in the building. In addition, the northern reception area had a custom-made artwork by Norman Ives, composed of six sculptural panels depicting typefaces in various sizes. The southern reception area had a lithograph depicting Columbus in 1886, and a sign from the newspaper's previous building was displayed in the employee lounge.

== History ==
The Brown family founded the Columbus Republican in 1872; the newspaper remained in the family for more than 140 years. The Republican (later renamed The Republic) moved to Fifth and Franklin streets in 1925, after occupying two earlier structures. The Fifth Street headquarters was overcrowded by 1959, when The Republic's owner Robert N. Brown selected Myron Goldsmith of SOM to design a new building. Brown did not want to hire any of the architects that had designed public buildings under the Cummins Foundation's design program. Ultimately, Brown postponed his plans so he could begin publishing the Daily Journal in Franklin, Indiana. Goldsmith was hired to design a building for the Daily Journal, which was completed in 1963. Like the later Republic design, the Daily Journal building had a glass facade that exposed a printing press inside, but the Daily Journal design differed in that it had an exposed steel frame and windows recessed behind a colonnade. After the Daily Journal commission, Brown, Goldsmith, and their respective families remained in close contact.

=== Development ===
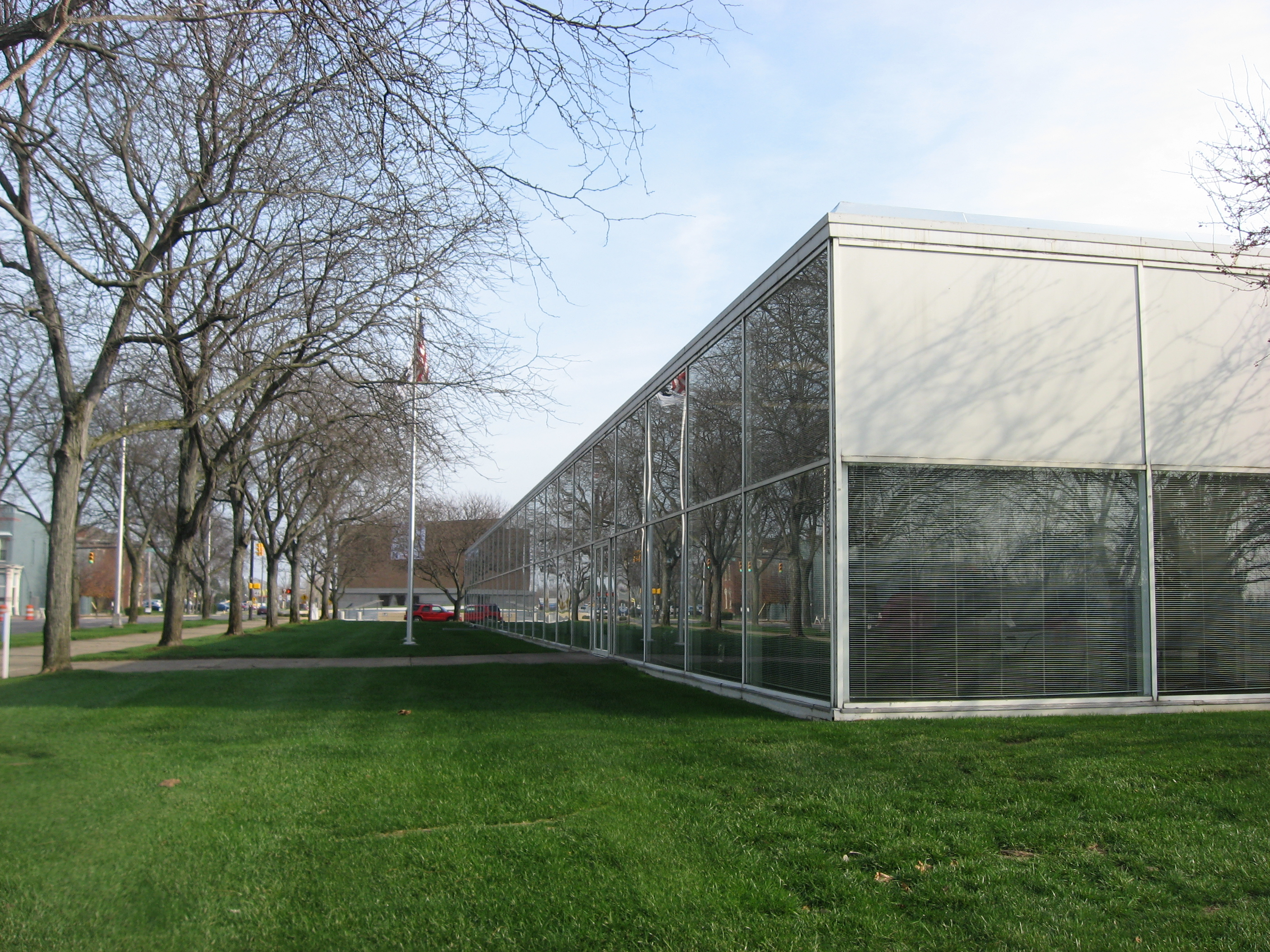
One corner of the building, showing aluminum panels in the upper register

The Republic building, the newspaper's fourth headquarters, was developed as part of a 1960s urban renewal master plan, which sought to redevelop a portion of downtown Columbus east of the Flatrock River. In 1967, Goldsmith suggested to Brown that one of the urban renewal sites, just south of the Bartholomew County Courthouse, would be ideal as a site for the new Republic building. Brown decided to rehire Goldsmith to design the new building, and SOM was also hired to oversee the overall master plan in 1968. Because SOM was concurrently designing both the master plan and the Republic building, many of the design details in the Republic building were integrated into the overall master plan. Brown then submitted a bid for the first city block being offered for redevelopment as part of the Columbus master plan, which was placed on sale in December 1968. Brown's bid was selected by default, as no one else had submitted bids.

In February 1969, Brown publicly presented plans for the building. The one-story glass structure would contain the executive offices, accounting department, and printing plant for four newspapers. Among its features was a $450,000 printing press that would replace the letterpress printing operation at the Fifth Street building. Brown later wrote that he wanted "a building incorporating not only maximum operational efficiency but also great architectural beauty". After the design was approved by a committee for the Columbus redevelopment project, The Republic spent the next six months clearing the site. A local contractor, Dunlap and Company, was hired to construct the building, beating out nine other companies who submitted bids for the job. On November 7, 1969, Robert Brown and his sister attended a groundbreaking ceremony for the new building, with 80 guests in attendance. During the construction process, more than 100 changes were made to the original plans. Most of these changes were minor, and the building was completed under budget, with a final cost of $1,104,425.

=== The Republic use ===
The Republic moved into the new building during the weekend of July 17–18, 1971, and the building printed its first issue on July 19. The newspaper offered its previous building at 44 Fifth Street to the city government, but the city council declined the offer; the Columbus Area Chamber of Commerce eventually took space there. Meanwhile, at the new building, The Republic hosted open house events for advertisers, contractors, material suppliers, and newspaper publishers in late September 1971. Shortly afterward, The Republic published a special edition inviting the public to see its new building; about 2,400 people attended the public open house that October.

The glass-walled design, which allowed passersby to see the building's printing plant from the outset, remained relatively unchanged over the years. The building was designed with more space than The Republic initially needed; the printing press was equipped to print as many as 35,000 copies per day. At a speech in late 1971, Brown claimed that the building would not need to be expanded for 15 years. The Architectural Record wrote in 1972 that the owners "do not anticipate major expansion" and that any physical expansion would be built somewhere else on the same block. In 1973, The Republic hired PPG Industries to install insulating strips along the windows, and aluminum angles were added at the bottom of the facade to improve drainage. The Republic replaced the newsrooms' typewriters with electronic editing terminals in 1977. The roof was replaced with a gravel surface in the 1980s. Jeff Brown, Robert's son, later said the structure could "accommodate pretty much everything we have thrown at it over the years", requiring minimal changes even when departments were added or rearranged.

The printing press was removed from the building in 1997, when all printing functions were moved off site. The critic Blair Kamin wrote that the printing press's relocation, which might not have been newsworthy in a large city, provoked dozens of concerned inquiries from the public, who thought the newspaper was closing down entirely. A new printing plant was built near Interstate 65, replacing the plant at The Republic's downtown office; the new plant was designed by Gilberti Spittler International in a similar style to the Second Street building. At the time, the Second Street building had only enough space to store a two-day supply of newsprint, while the new plant could store a six-week supply of newsprint. After the new plant opened, the printing press's former space was converted into offices. Years after the printing press was removed, passersby lamented its removal. A new reception area was added on the eastern side of the building in 2008.

=== Later use ===
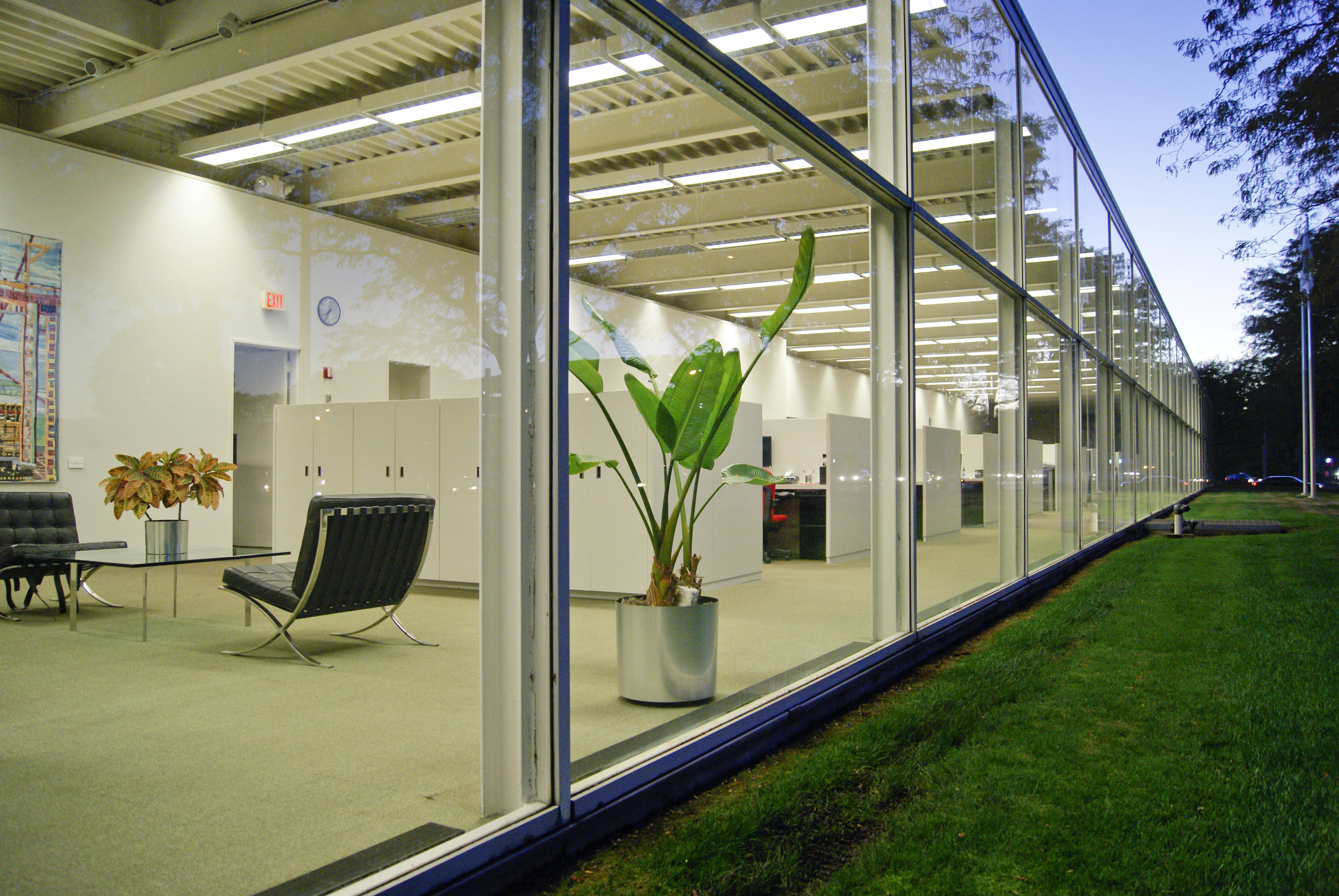
The building's aluminum frame and large glass windows

In May 2016, the Republic building on Second Street was purchased by Southeastern Indiana Medical Holdings, a Columbus Regional Health affiliate, for $2.77 million for use as an administrative office. That December, the newspaper relocated out of the Republic building. The newspaper's new building, covering about 17,000 square feet (1,600 m^{2}) at 2980 National Road, had been selected because it had open plan offices and was close to U.S. 31. For the old building, Columbus Regional Health planned to modify the interior but leave the facade in place, and it planned to use the building's parking lot. Columbus Regional ultimately decided against using the building, instead planning to sell it to another organization. In the meantime, the building remained vacant.

Indiana University (IU) purchased the building from Southeastern Indiana Medical Holdings in April 2018. The building was intended to house the university's new J. Irwin Miller Architecture Program and was Indiana University's second structure in Columbus, after the IU Center for Art and Design Columbus. In conjunction with its purchase, Indiana University received a $1 million grant from the city government and raised the same amount through donations. The funds were used to upgrade mechanical systems, make repairs, and conduct asbestos abatement. The Republic building did not require many changes to accommodate the university, other than the addition of a concrete partition. IU moved into the building in August 2018, initially accommodating 20 students there, and formally dedicated the building on January 31, 2019. The Indianapolis Business Journal described the Republic building as Columbus's "marquee contribution to the master's program" of IU.

== Impact ==
=== Reception ===
When the building was completed, Paul Goldberger of The New York Times that SOM had made "an attempt to turn a Miesian glass pavilion into a commercial space", just like the firm's earlier Manufacturers Trust Company Building in New York City. Goldberger wrote that the Republic office's freestanding nature contrasted with the Manufacturers Trust Company's constrained setting. The Architectural Record called it "an exceptional industrial building" because of its transparent design, form, function, and location, while American Press magazine called the building "more than beautiful". Harry McCawley, a longtime associate editor for The Republic, told Architecture: The AIA Journal in 1980 that the building was "the best recruiting tool we've got", joking that the allure of the building's design for new employees was like giving them a pay raise. Blair Kamin of the Chicago Tribune called the Republic building a "Miesian box" whose printing press drew comparison to a kinetic sculpture.

After IU took over the building, McCawley wrote that "Motorists had only to turn their head at a certain time in the afternoon and they could see newsprint whirring by on the unique offset press." Kamin wrote that the design "spoke with resonant clarity and conviction, powerfully symbolizing the transparency of the free press", and that the lightness of the decorations differed from the "muscular structural expressionism" often seen in Chicago.

=== Awards and media ===
The Republic Newspaper Office was the first building completed as part of the Columbus master plan and was described as a major part of the redevelopment. The Republic wrote that its building's completion was credited with influencing further development of the master plan. American Press gave the Republic building an award in 1971, recognizing it as the best-designed printing plant in the country. The American Steel Institute gave the Republic building its 1972–1973 award for "excellence in design of low rise construction". The building received an Honor Award from the American Institute of Architects in 1975; it was one of nine buildings to win the award that year, out of 600 nominations. On October 17, 2012, the Republic building was designated a National Historic Landmark for its architecture. This made it the seventh structure in Columbus to receive the title and the youngest such landmark ever designated.

When the building opened, Ezra Stoller was commissioned to take pictures of the building on SOM's behalf. The structure was featured in publications such as The American Press, the Architectural Record, and Lanus, and the design was highlighted in a radio program broadcast on CBS during 1972, where it was described as a "living sculpture". The building was featured throughout the 2017 film Columbus; one observer wrote that the building's role in the film was that of "the giddy child who, brimming over with excitement, just can't bear to keep the promise they swore only moments prior that they would". In addition, after retiring from SOM, Goldsmith wrote a book about his architectural works in 1987, devoting six pages to the Republic building.

== See also ==
- List of National Historic Landmarks in Indiana
- National Register of Historic Places listings in Bartholomew County, Indiana
