= Myron Goldsmith =

American architect (1918–1996)

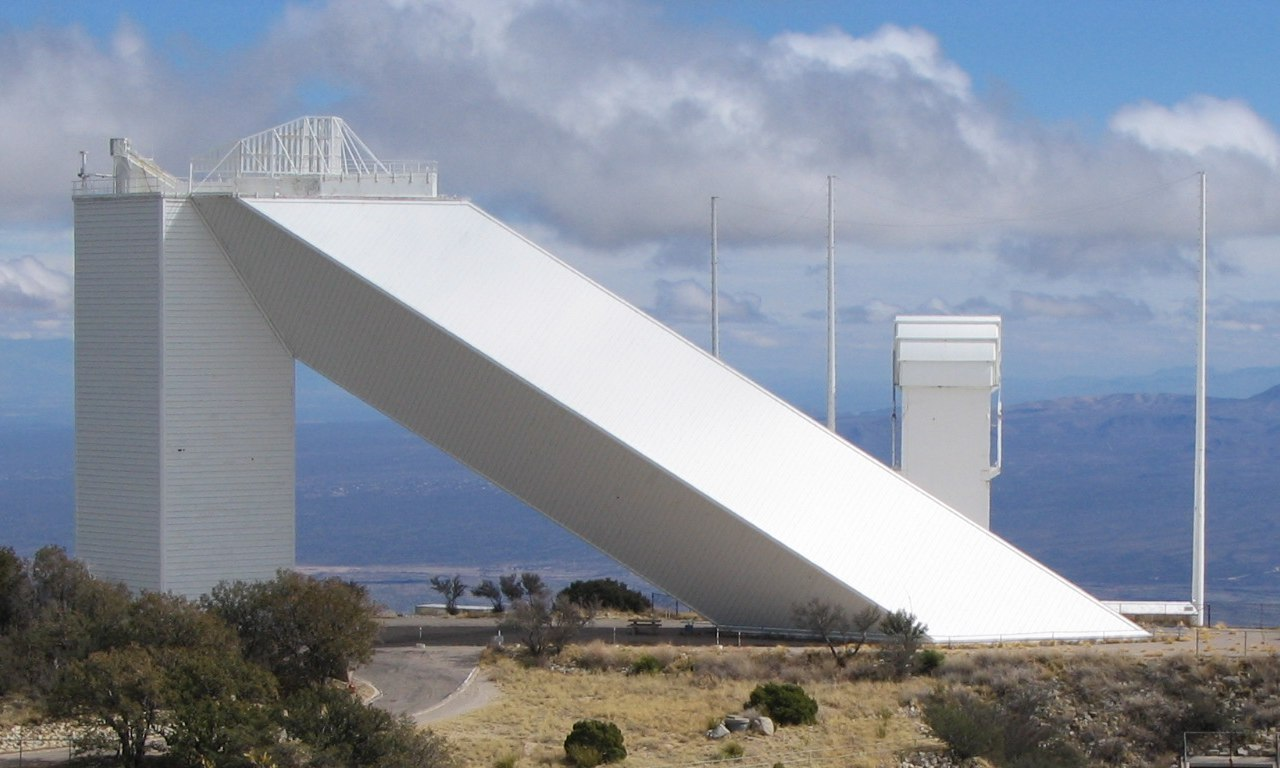
McMath–Pierce solar telescope building

Myron Goldsmith (September 15, 1918 – July 15, 1996) was an American architect and designer. He was a student of Mies van der Rohe and Pier Luigi Nervi before designing 40 projects at Skidmore, Owings & Merrill from 1955 to 1983. His last 16 years at the firm he was a general partner in its Chicago office. His best known project is the McMath–Pierce solar telescope building constructed in 1962 at the Kitt Peak National Observatory in Arizona. It is visited by an estimated 100,000 people a year.

== Background ==
Goldsmith was born in Chicago and graduated in 1939 from the Illinois Institute of Technology, where he studied under Mies, whose Chicago office he joined in 1946. He worked there until 1953, when he received a Fulbright grant to study under Nervi at the University of Rome.

== Career ==
His first major projects at Skidmore were two United Airlines hangars at San Francisco International Airport, one of which used cantilevered steel girders to hold four DC-8 jetliners. He was a professor of architecture at the Illinois Institute of Technology beginning in 1961.

In his 1987 monograph he wrote that: "A building should be built with economy, efficiency, discipline and order." At the time of his death, he was a member of a team organized by the institute to design a 120-story office, hotel and commercial structure in Seoul for the Hyundai Engineering and Construction Company. The project, known as "Hankang City," would have been one of the world's tallest buildings at 1,699.48 feet; but the project was canceled and the building was never built.

== Projects ==
- Plaza on Dewitt (1960)
- McMath–Pierce solar telescope building (1962)
- Brunswick Building (1965)
- Oakland Alameda County Coliseum (1966)
- Illinois Institute of Technology Academic Campus - Keating Hall, Robert A. Pritzker Science Center, John T. Rettaliata Engineering Center, Stuart Hall (1966–1971)
- The Republic Newspaper Office (1971) in Columbus, Indiana
- Ruck-a-Chucky Bridge (unbuilt) planned to cross the American River in Auburn, California northeast of Sacramento

== Gallery ==
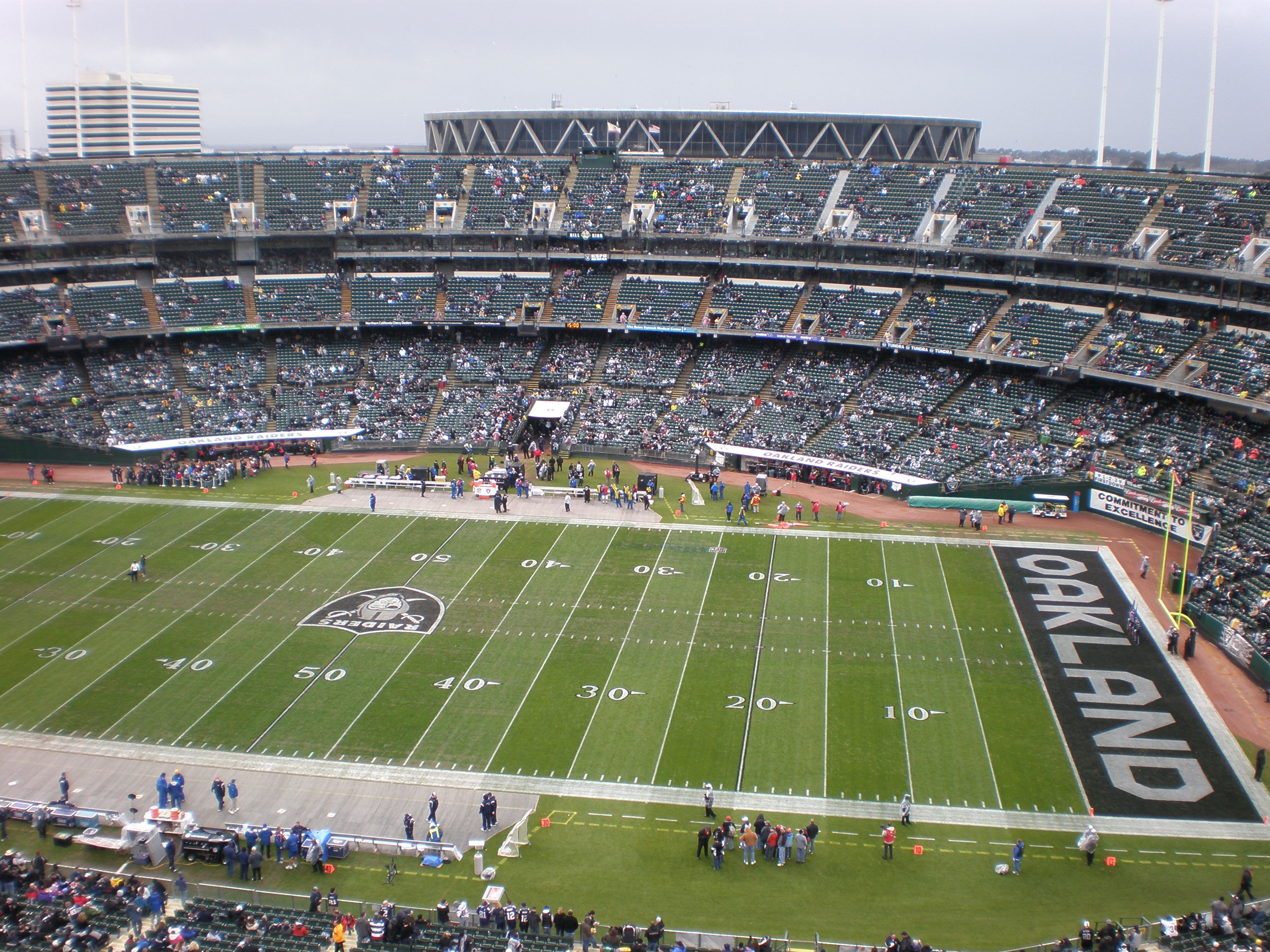
Oakland Coliseum

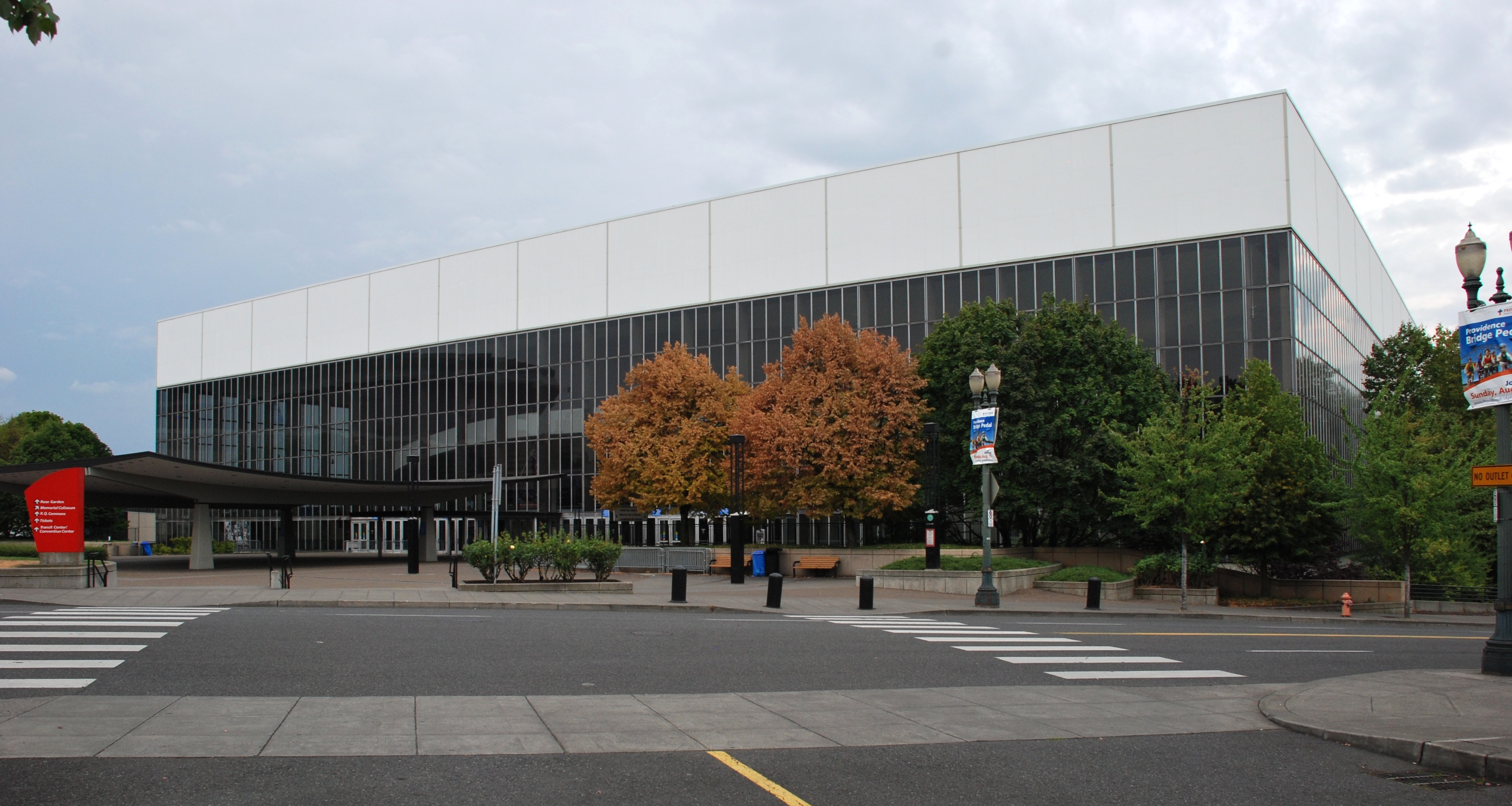
Portland Memorial Coliseum

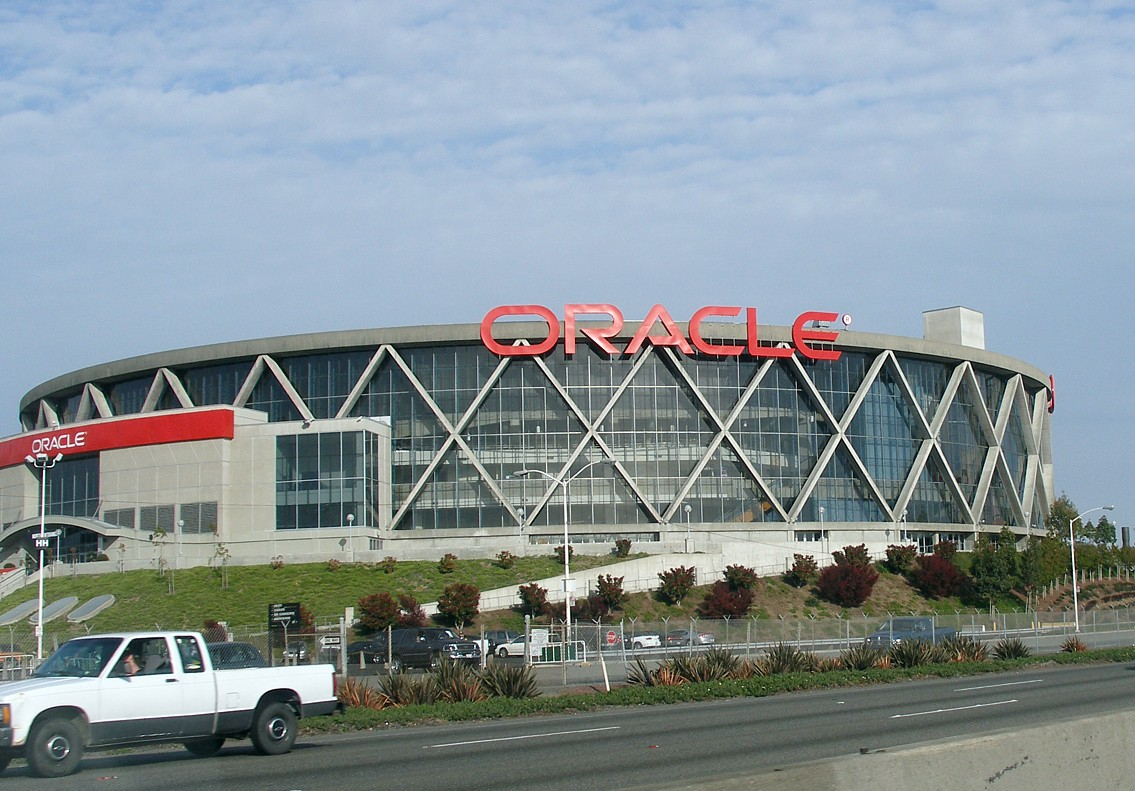
Oracle Arena

== Exhibitions ==
- The Unknown Mies van der Rohe and His Disciples of Modernism, Art Institute of Chicago, Chicago (1986)
- Myron Goldsmith: Poet of Structure, Canadian Centre for Architecture, Montreal (1991)

== See also ==
- Gary Berkovich
