= Gary Berkovich =

American architect

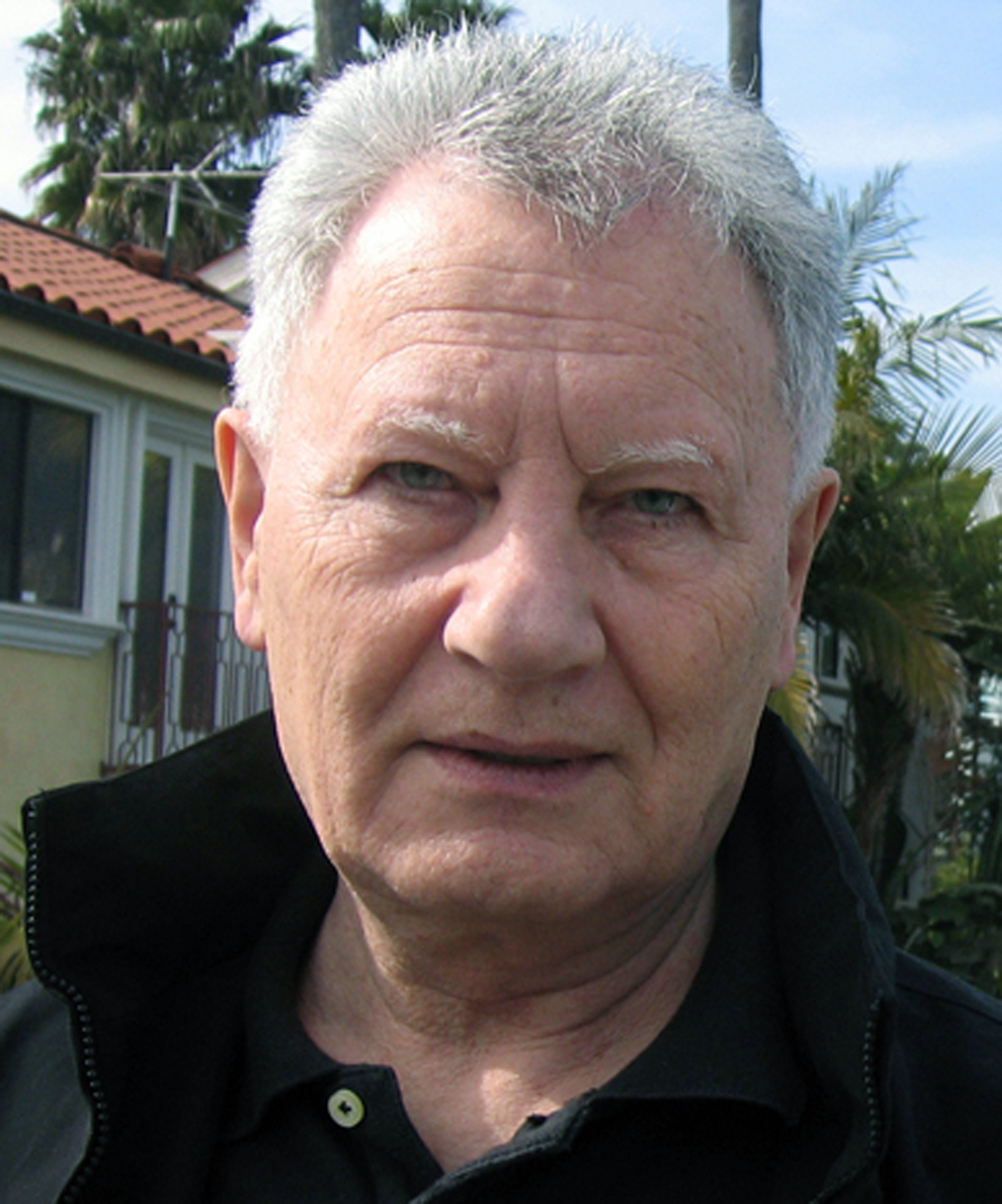
- Born: May 26, 1935; Kharkiv, Soviet Union
- Occupation: Architect
- Buildings: Civic Center of the town of Tereze, Caucasus, USSR; Apartment High-Rise. Chicago, IL, USA.

Gary Berkovich, AIA, NCARB (born May 26, 1935, in Kharkiv, Ukrainian SSR, Soviet Union) is an American and Soviet architect, and the first Soviet architect of 1960s – 1980s immigration wave, who had opened his office (Gary A. Berkovich Associates, 1987) in the United States. Author of about 200 projects of residential and public buildings in the USSR and in the USA. He is a winner of the architectural competitions in the Soviet Union and in the United States. He is also an author of books and professional articles.

== Biography ==
Gary Berkovich was born to a Jewish family in Ukraine. He had graduated from the Kharkiv Building Technical School (1953) and the Moscow School of Architecture (1964), both with honours. In 1973, he got a PhD from Moscow Housing Design and Research Institute for his thesis, dedicated to the computerization of architectural design ("The problems of an apartment layout optimization solutions"). He worked in architectural firms of Kharkiv, Novosibirsk and Moscow, USSR. Immigrated to the US in 1977. Worked in the office of Skidmore, Owings and Merrill (under architects Myron Goldsmith and Bruce Graham) and at the office of Aubrey J. Greenberg, Chicago, USA. He played a trifling role in a Hollywood movie (1989). In 1985, he received a diploma of the most successful immigrant, in Chicago, USA.

== Selected projects ==
- Chabad Synagogue, Niles, Illinois (IL), USA. 2006.
- Townhouses’ Development. Wilmette, IL, USA. With an architect, M. Berkovich. 1999.
- Restaurant. Glencoe, IL, USA. The best project of the year award. 1995.
- Single Family Residence. Wilmette, IL, USA1994.
- Single Family Residence. Highland Park, IL, USA. 1992.
- Single Family Residence. Chicago, IL, USA. 1990.
- Single Family Residence. Deerfield, IL, USA. 1988.
- Apartment High-Rise. Chicago, IL, USA. Conceptual design and Design Development. Construction Documents: E. Gordon. Architect of record: A Epstein & Sons. 1987.
- Townhouses’ Development. Chicago, IL, USA. 1986.
- Prototype Palace of Culture. Moscow, USSR. 1974.
- Civic Center of the town of Tereze, Caucasus, USSR. With an architect S. Chemeris. 1973.
- Prototype Apartment Building, Kokushkino, Tatar ASSR, USSR, 1971
- River Transportation Terminal. Tomsk, Siberia, USSR. 1975.
- Prototype High School for 464 students, 1971
- Prototype Shopping Centre, 1971
- Prototype Kindergarten School, 1971
- Prototype Housing for the South-East Siberia Region, USSR, 1970
- Tombstone, Zaporizhia, USSR, 1969
- Meatpacking Plant, Stupino, Moscow Region, USSR, 1969
- Meatpacking Plant, Dedovsk, Moscow Region, USSR, 1969
- Addition and Remodelling of an Exhibition Pavilion at the All-State Achievement Exhibition (VDNH) grounds, Moscow, USSR, 1969
- Design and Development Project, Town of Nizhniaia Paiva, Altai Region, Siberia, USSR, 1965-1966
- Creative Artist's Union Retreat House, Moscow Region, USSR, 1963-1964
- Prototype rail-road stations. Moscow, USSR. With an architect L. Polonskaya. 1962.

== Selected architectural competitions ==
- «The Peak» Resort. Hong Kong. International Competition Entry. Author, team leader. 1983.
- Town-house. Logan Square, Chicago, IL, USA. With an architect M. Berkovich. Finalist Award. 1981.
- Town-house. Competition Entry, Chicago, IL, USA. 1977.
- Prototype Single Family Residence. Citation. Moscow, USSR. 1968.
- Prototype 2-story Apartment Building. Citation. Moscow, USSR. 1967. With architects D. Radygin and A. Batalov. 1967.
- Prototype Town-houses. Third Prize. Moscow, USSR. With architects D. Radygin and A. Batalov. 1967.
- Prototype Single Family Residence. Third Prize. Moscow, USSR. With architects D. Radygin and A. Batalov. 1967.
- Prototype Dormitory. Moscow, USSR. With architects D. Radygin and A. Batalov. First Prize. 1967.
- Prototype Memorial Complex for World War II Veterans, 1967–68
- Research and Development Institute, Rzhavki, Moscow Region, Russia, 1968-1969

== Patents ==
- Prefabricated Residential Tower. Certificate 279001 (USSR), 13 April 1967

== Gallery ==
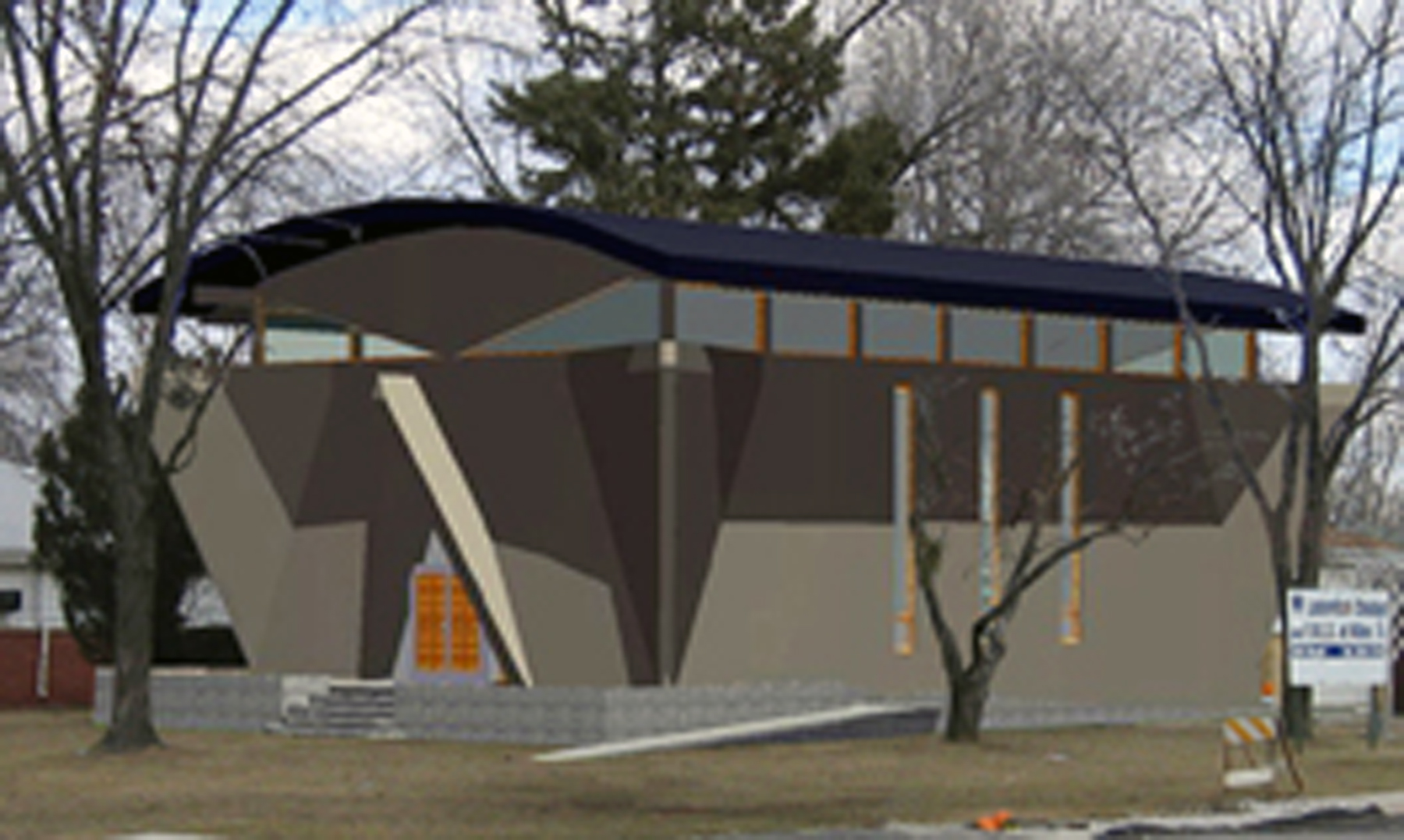
Chabad Synagogue, Niles, IL. 2006

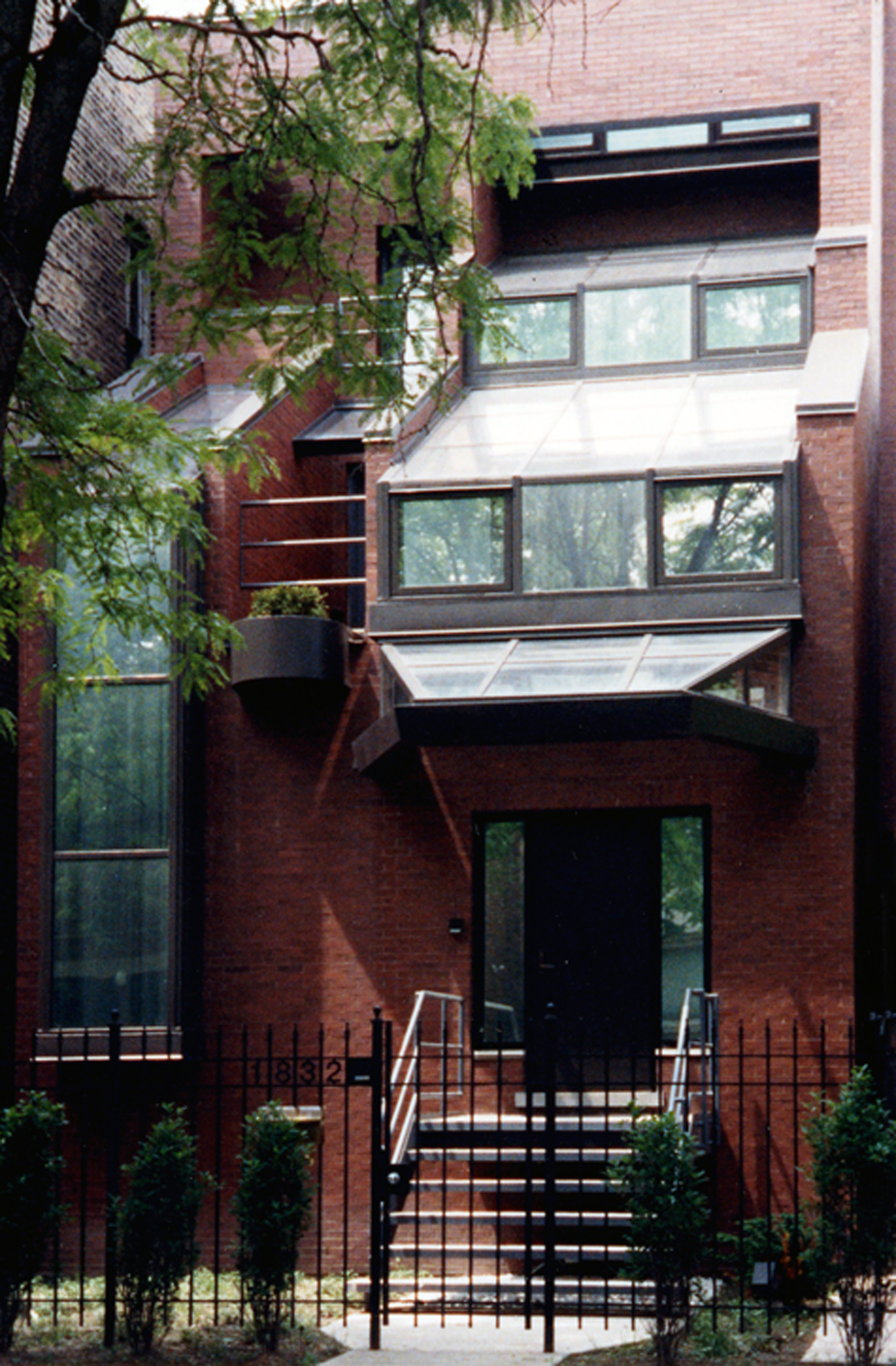
Single Family Residence. Chicago, IL. 1990

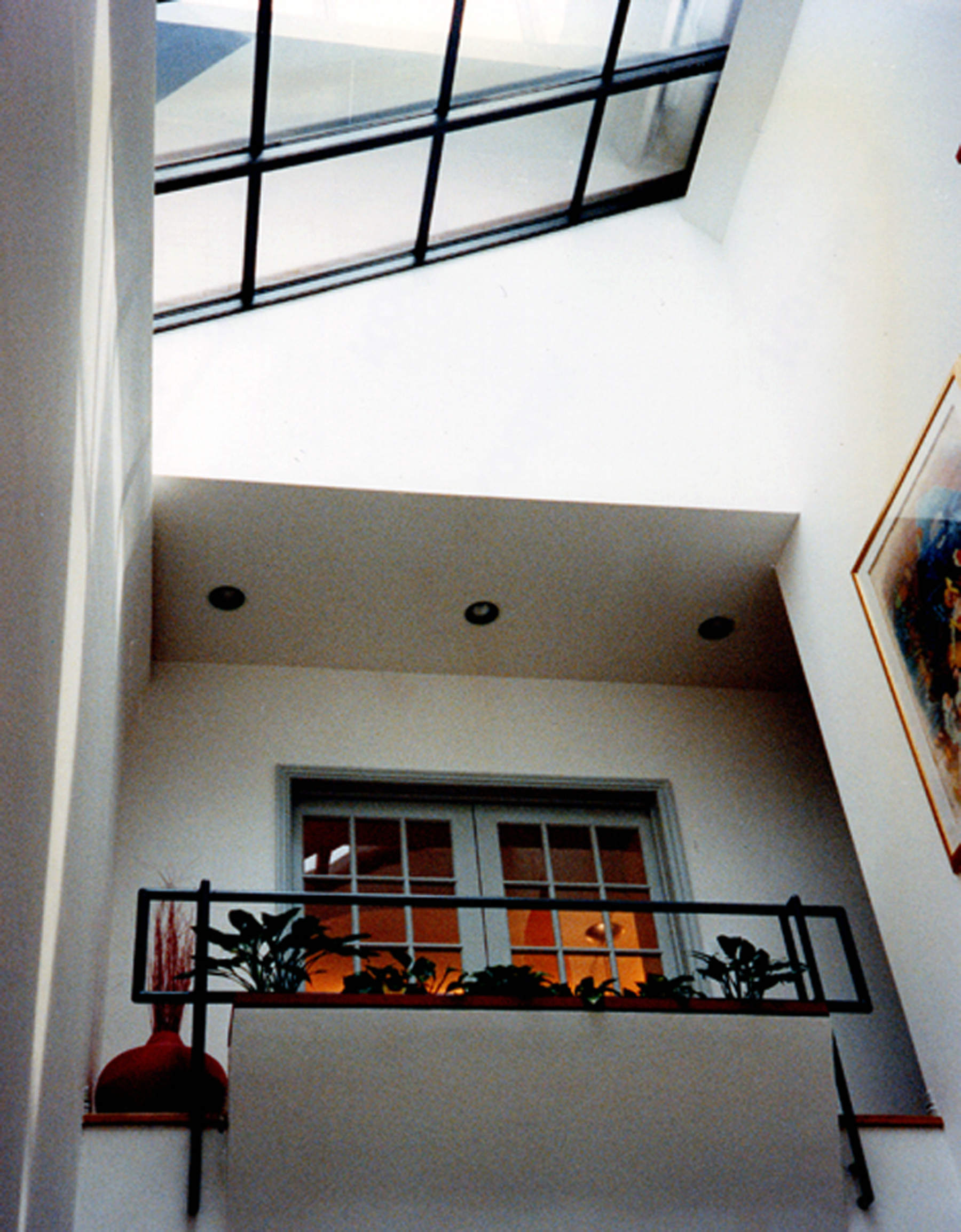
Single Family Residence. Interior. Chicago, IL. 1990

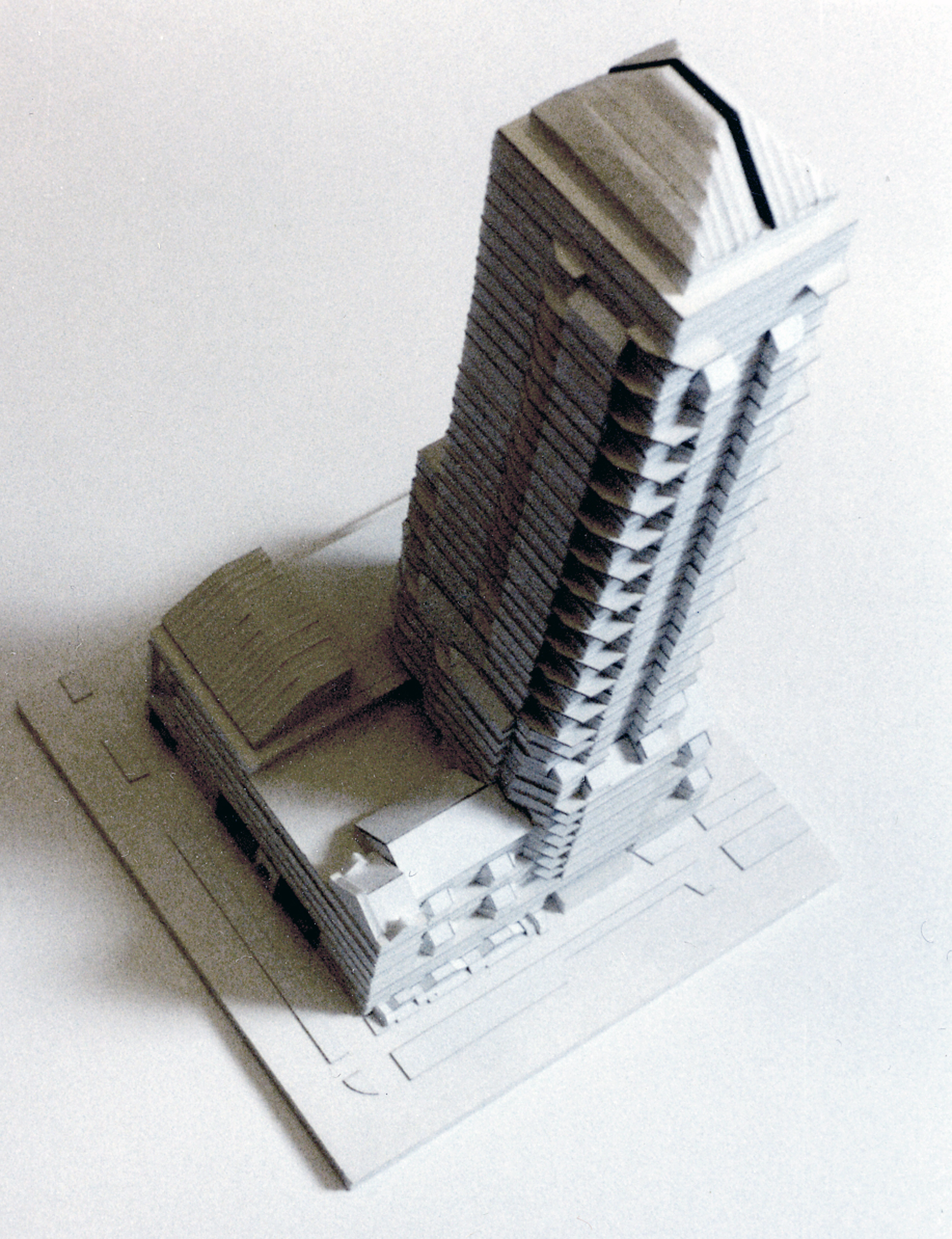
Apartment High-Rise. Model. Chicago, IL, USA. 1987

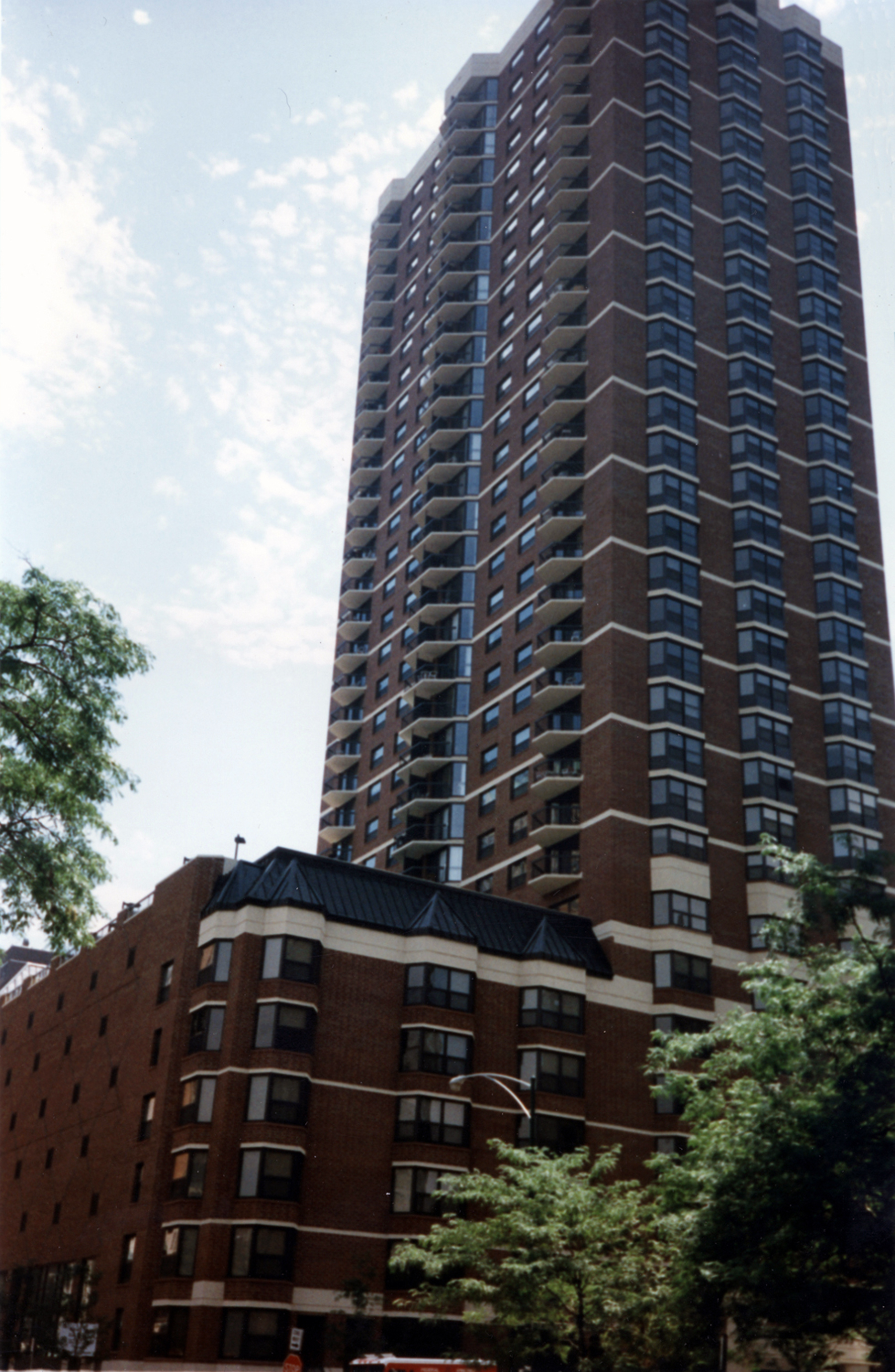
Apartment High-Rise. Chicago, IL. 1987

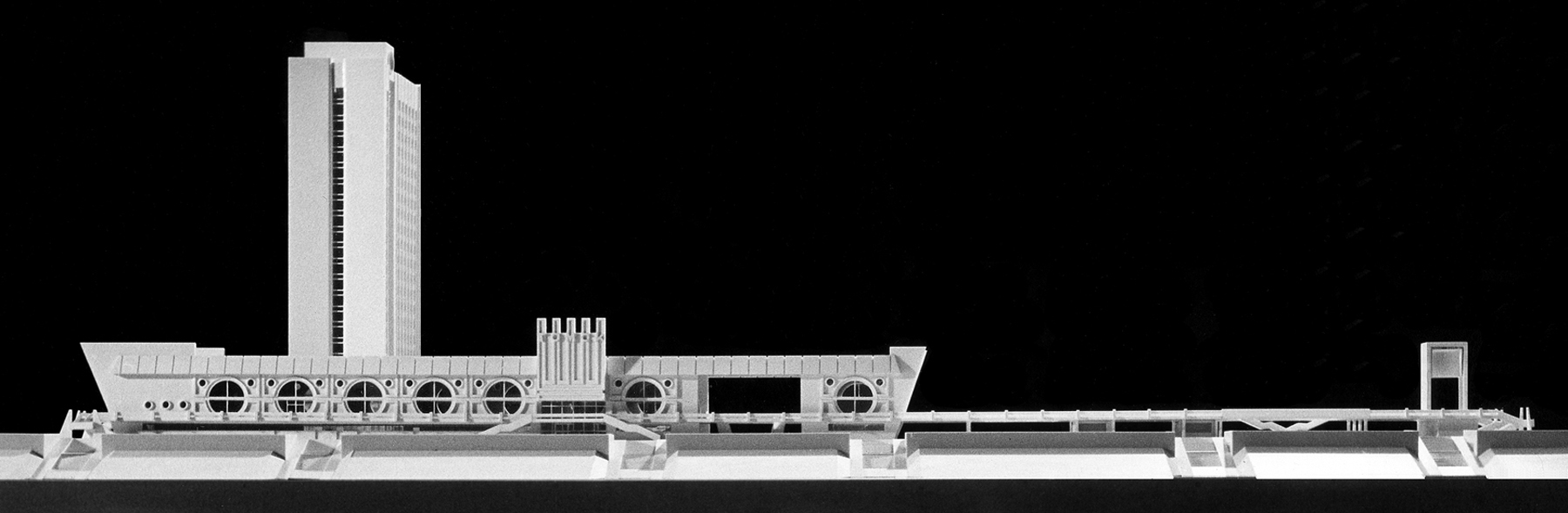
River Transportation Terminal. Tomsk, Siberia, USSR. 1975

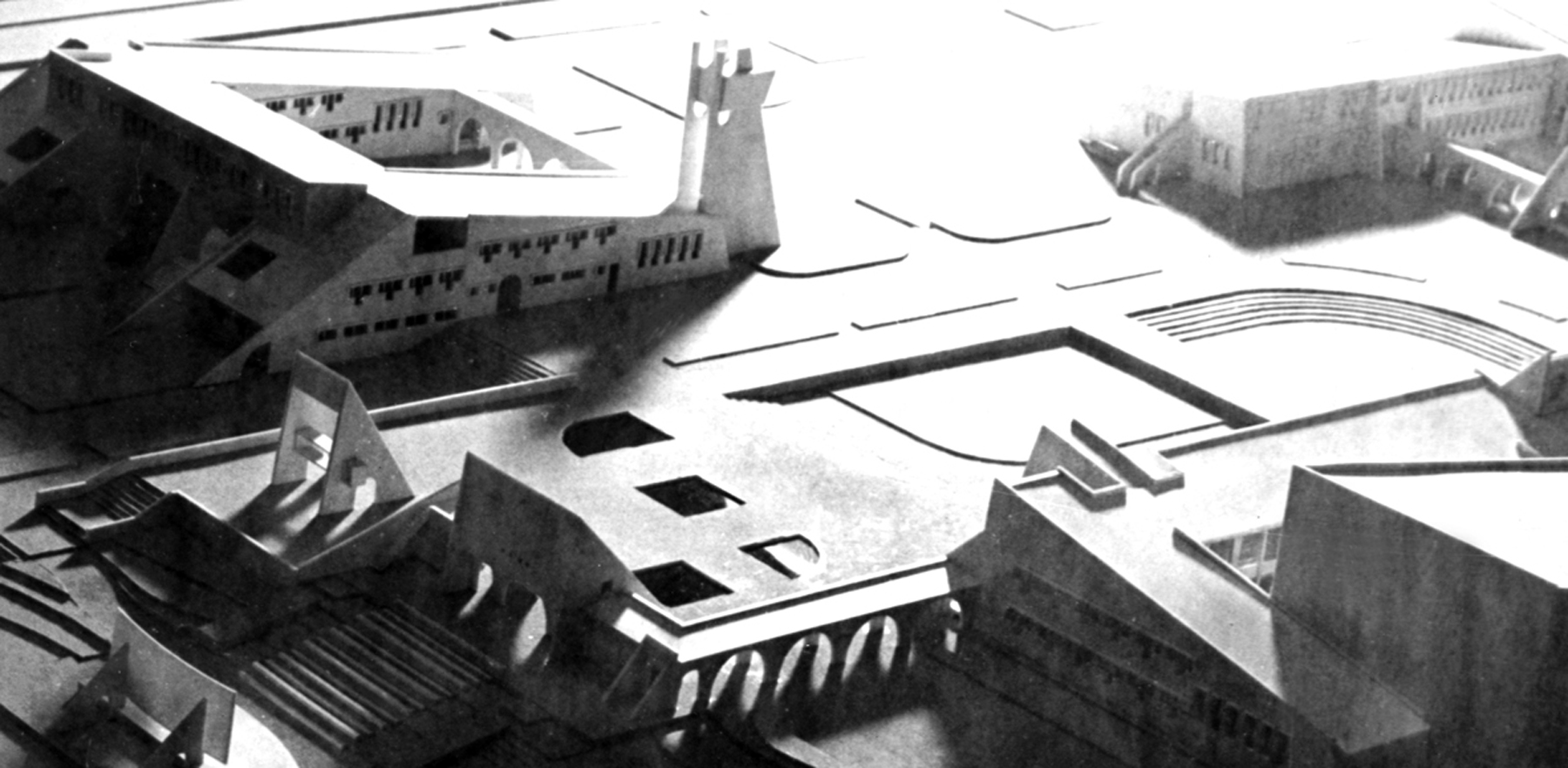
Civic Center of the town of Tereze. Model. Caucasus, USSR

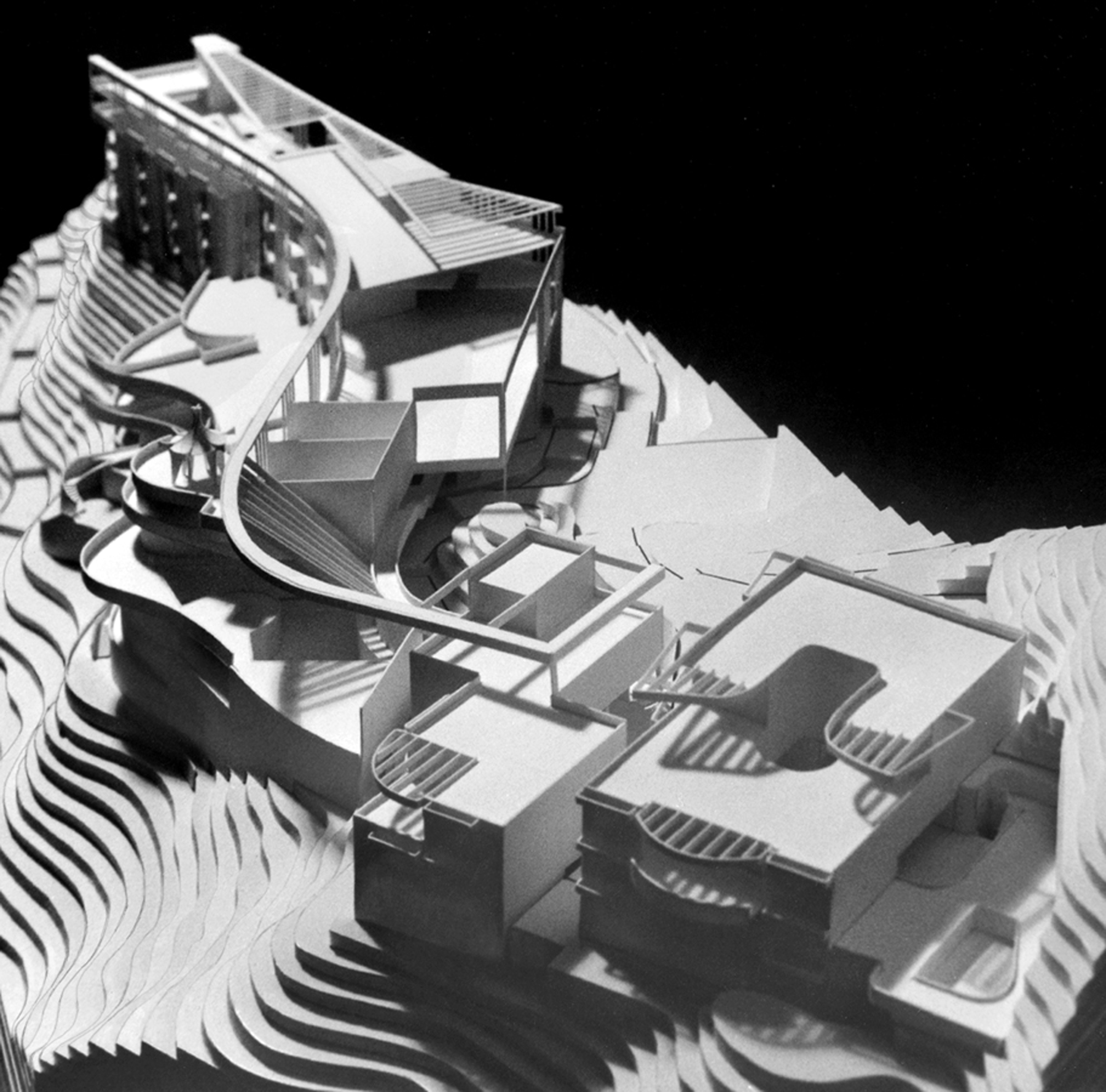
“The Peak” Resort. Hong Kong. International Competition Entry. Model. Author, team leader. 1983

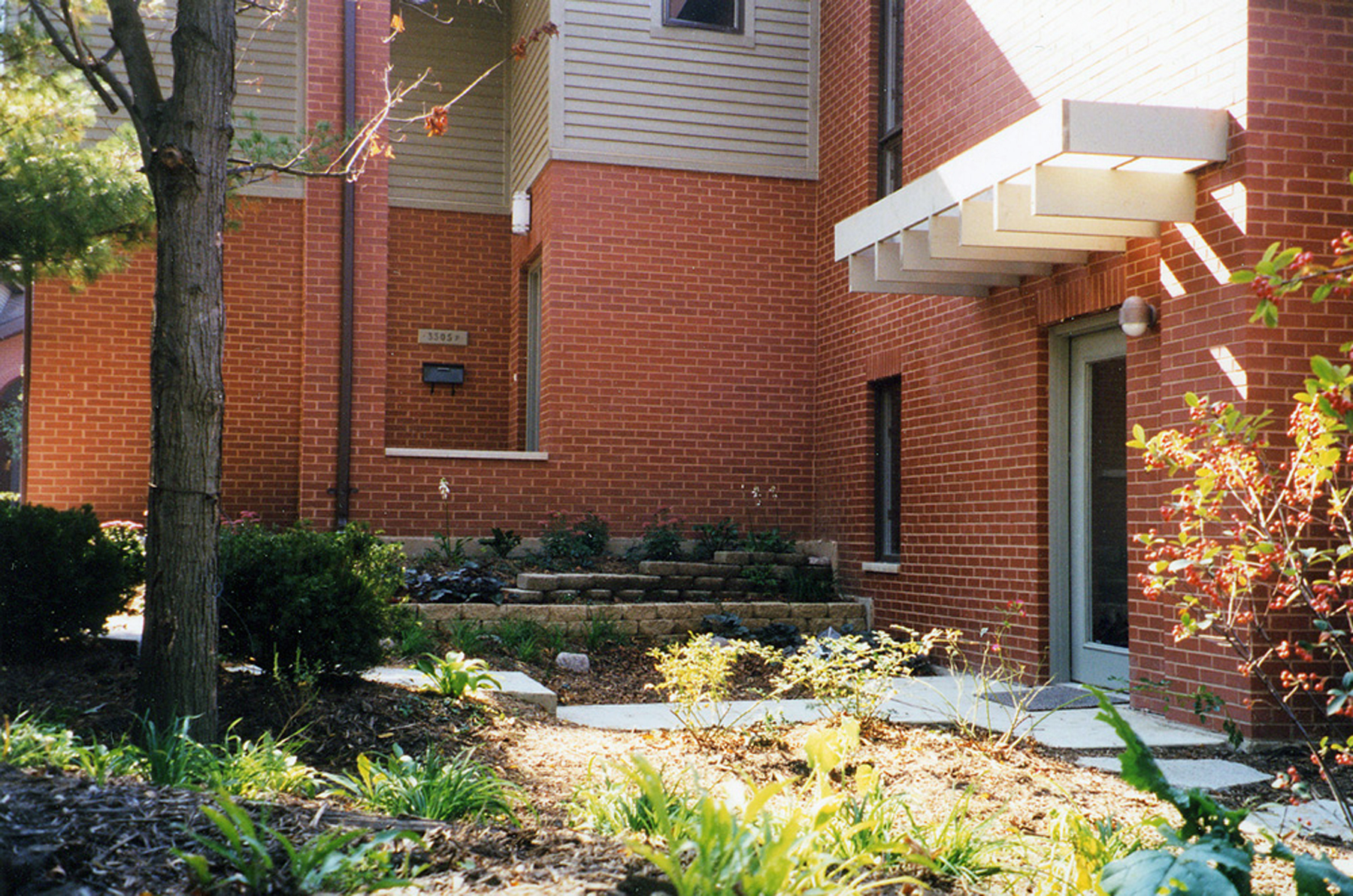
Luxury Townhouse Development. Wilmette, IL. 1999

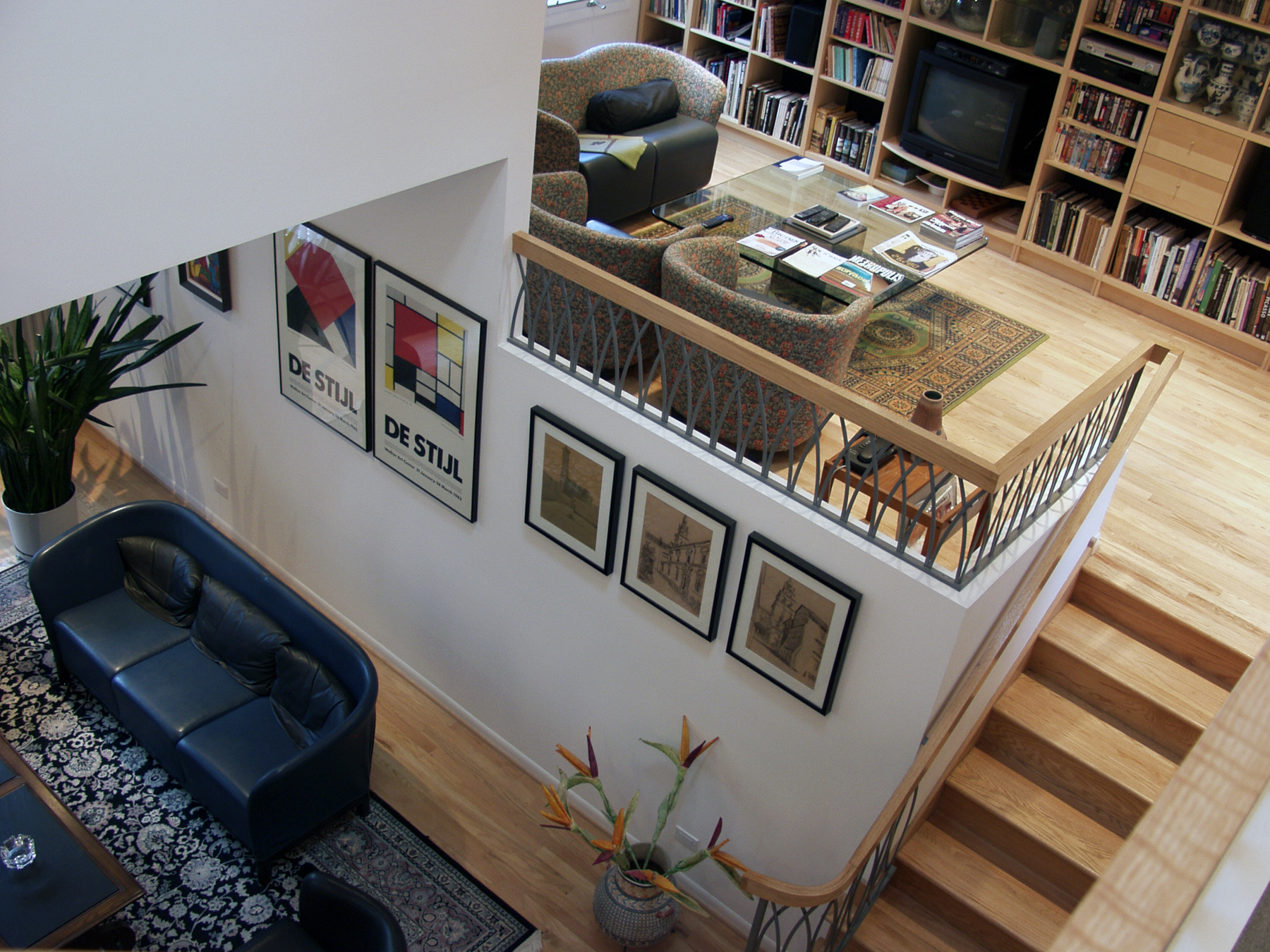
Luxury Townhouse Development. Interior. Wilmette, IL. 1999

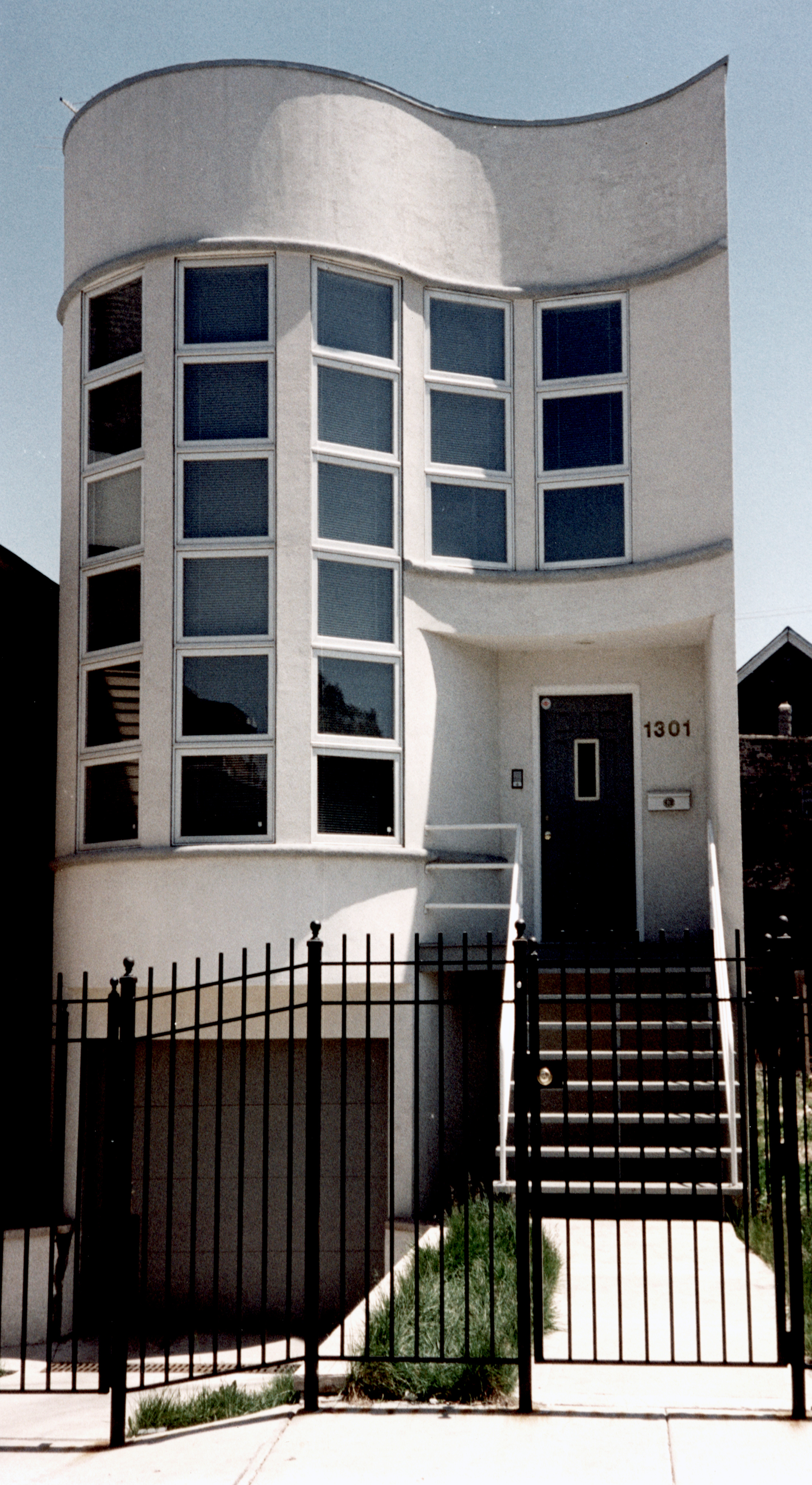
Single Family Residence. Chicago, IL. 1989

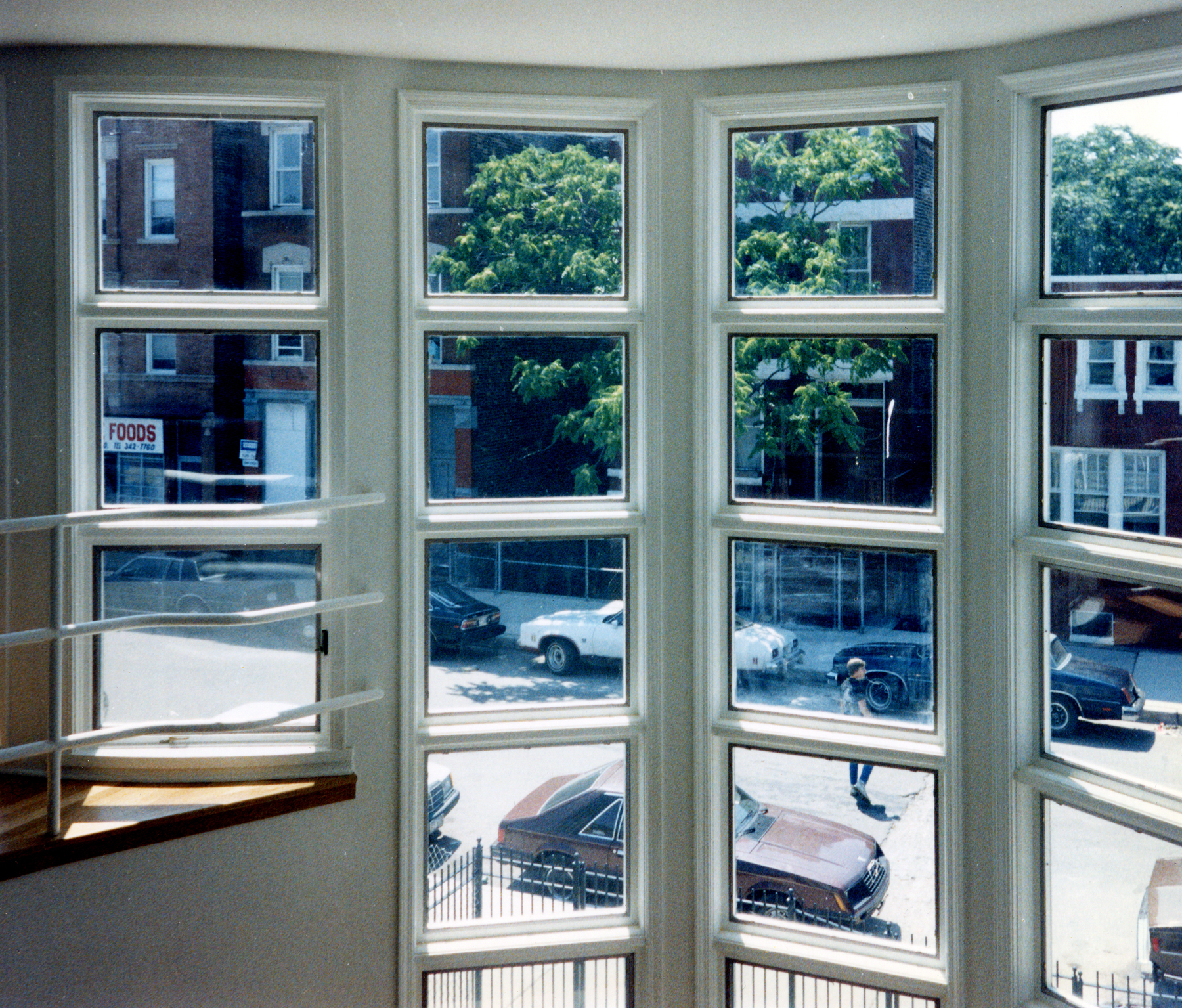
Single Family Residence. Interior. Chicago, IL. 1989

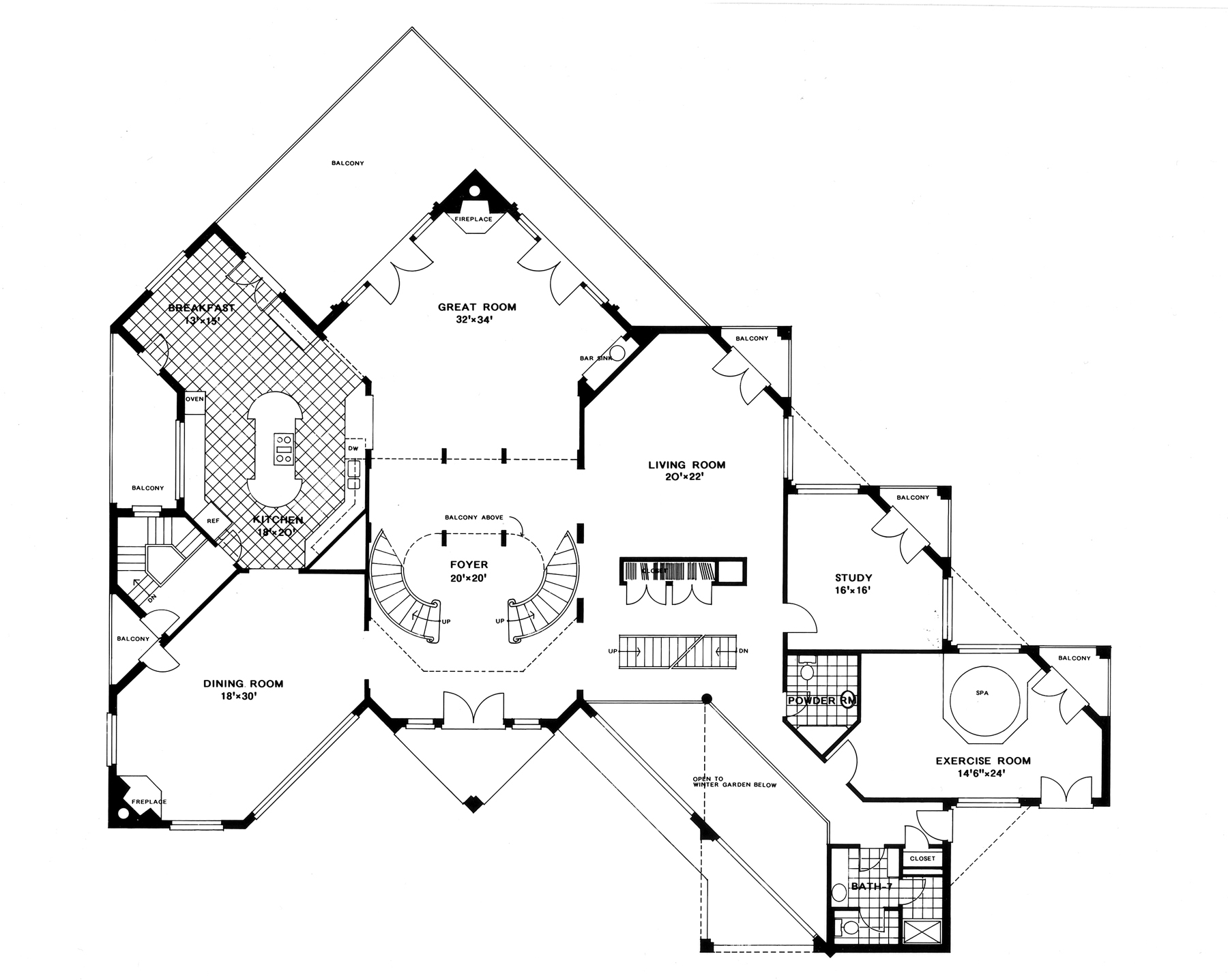
Single Family Residence. Glencoe, IL. 1994

Beauty Salon “Millennium.” Interior. Winnetka, IL. 1997.

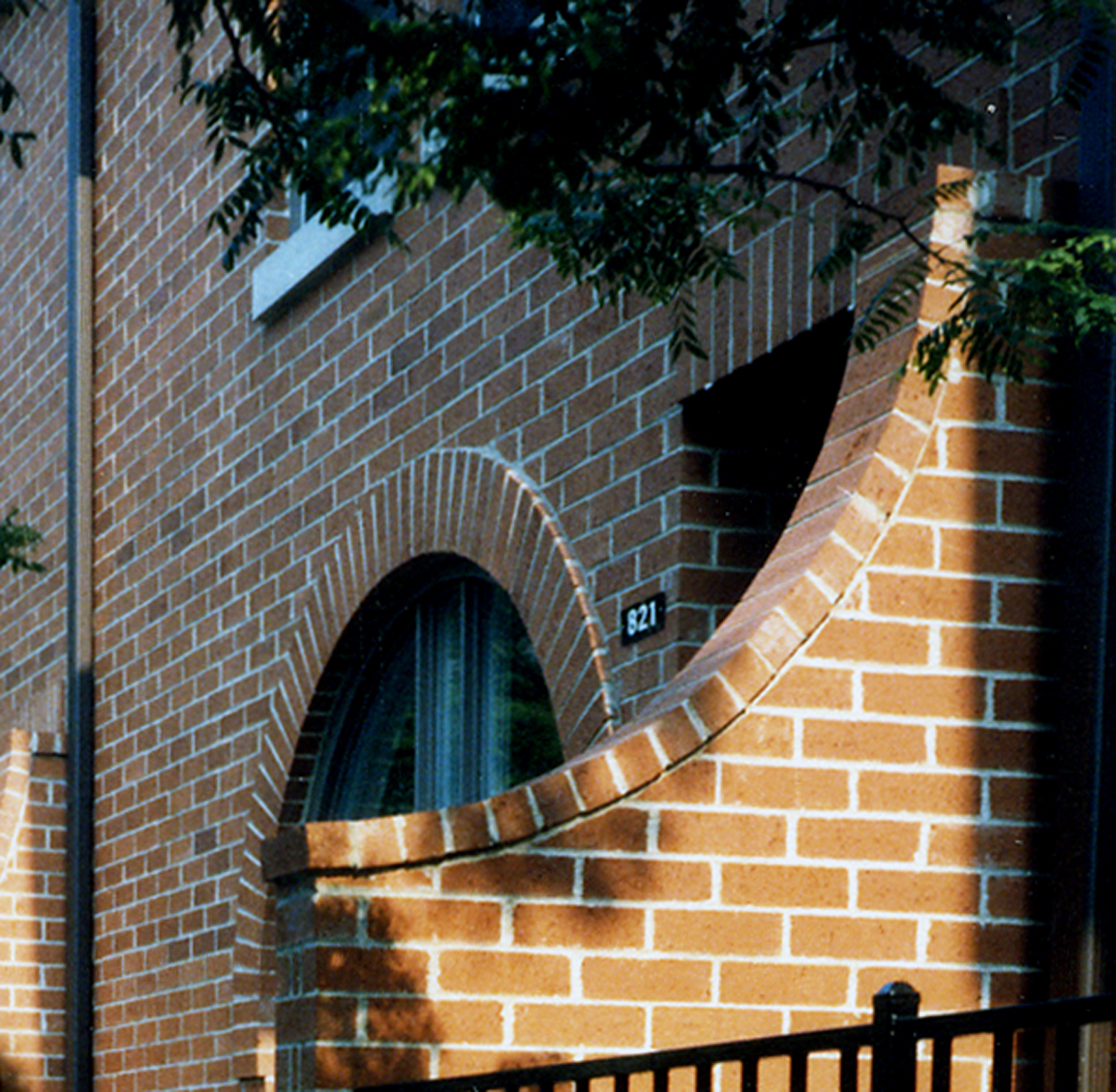
Willow-Dayton Housing Development. Detail. Chicago, IL. 1986

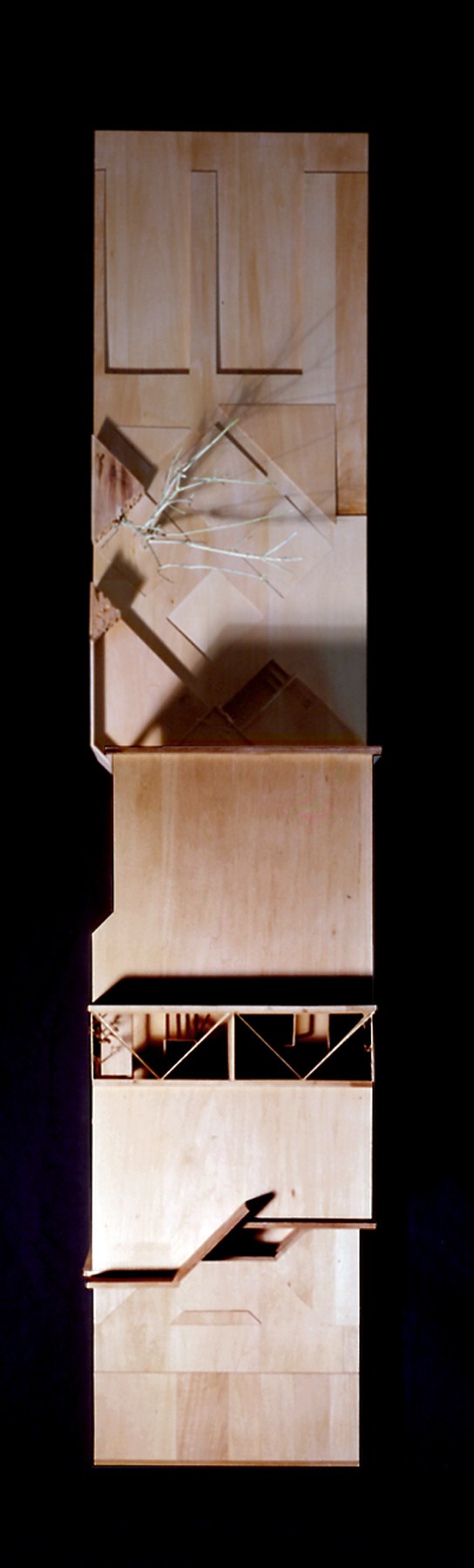
“Logan Square” Townhouse. Competition project. Model. Chicago, IL. 1981

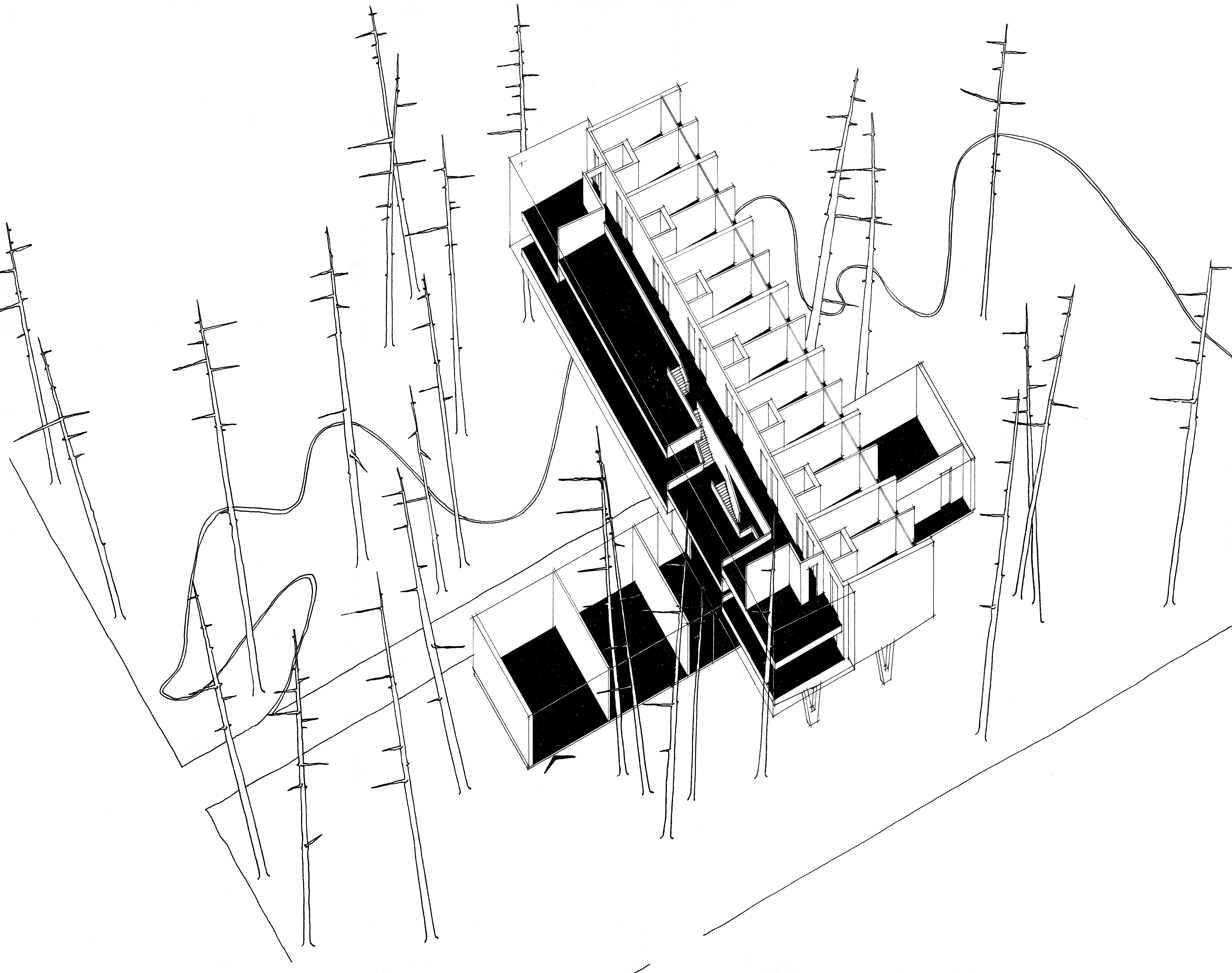
Creative Artist's Union Retreat House. Axonometric view. Moscow Region, USSR, 1963-1964

Creative Artist's Union Retreat House. Moscow Region, USSR. 1963-1964

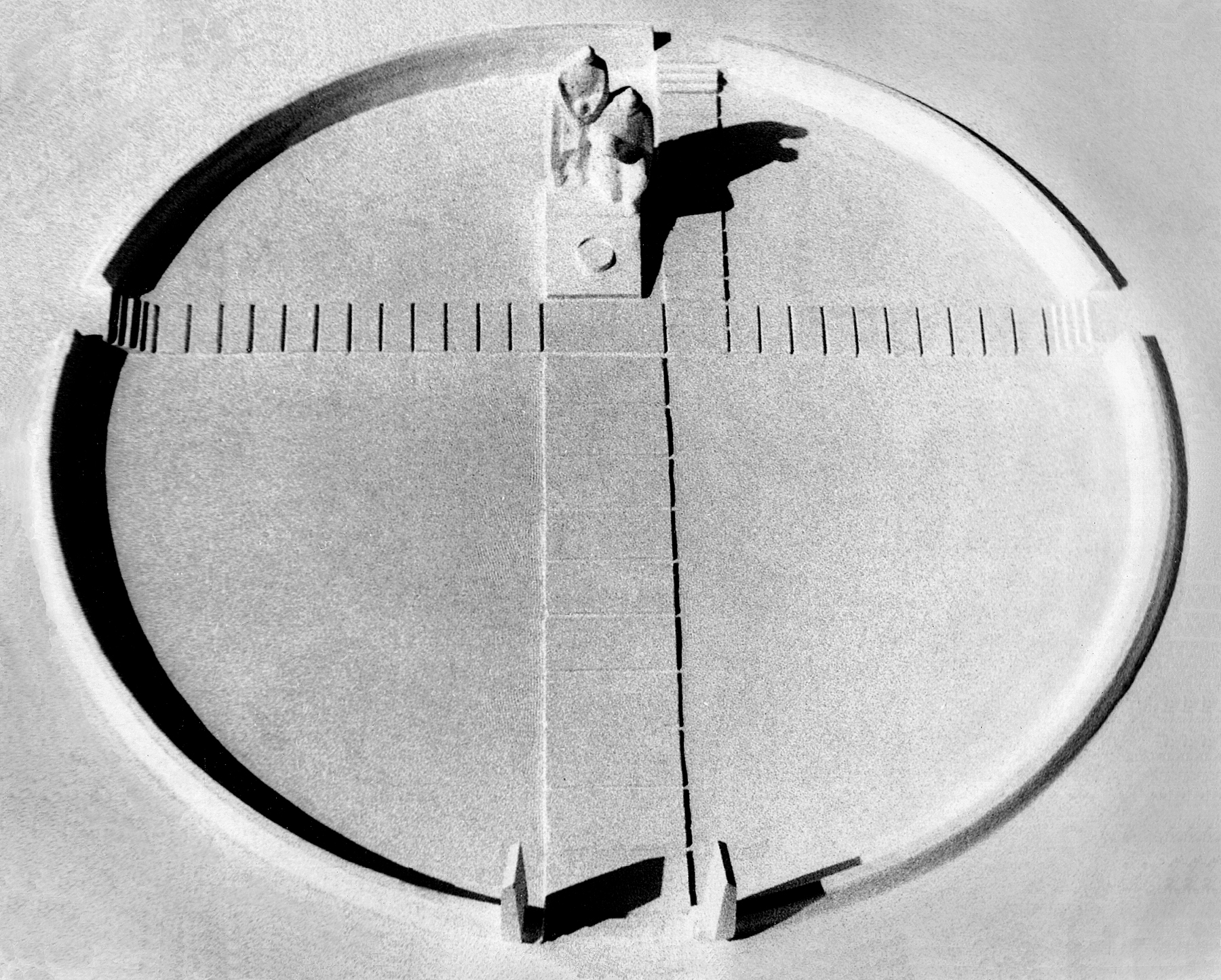
Monument to Perished Soldiers. Competition Entry. Model. Moscow, USSR, 1960

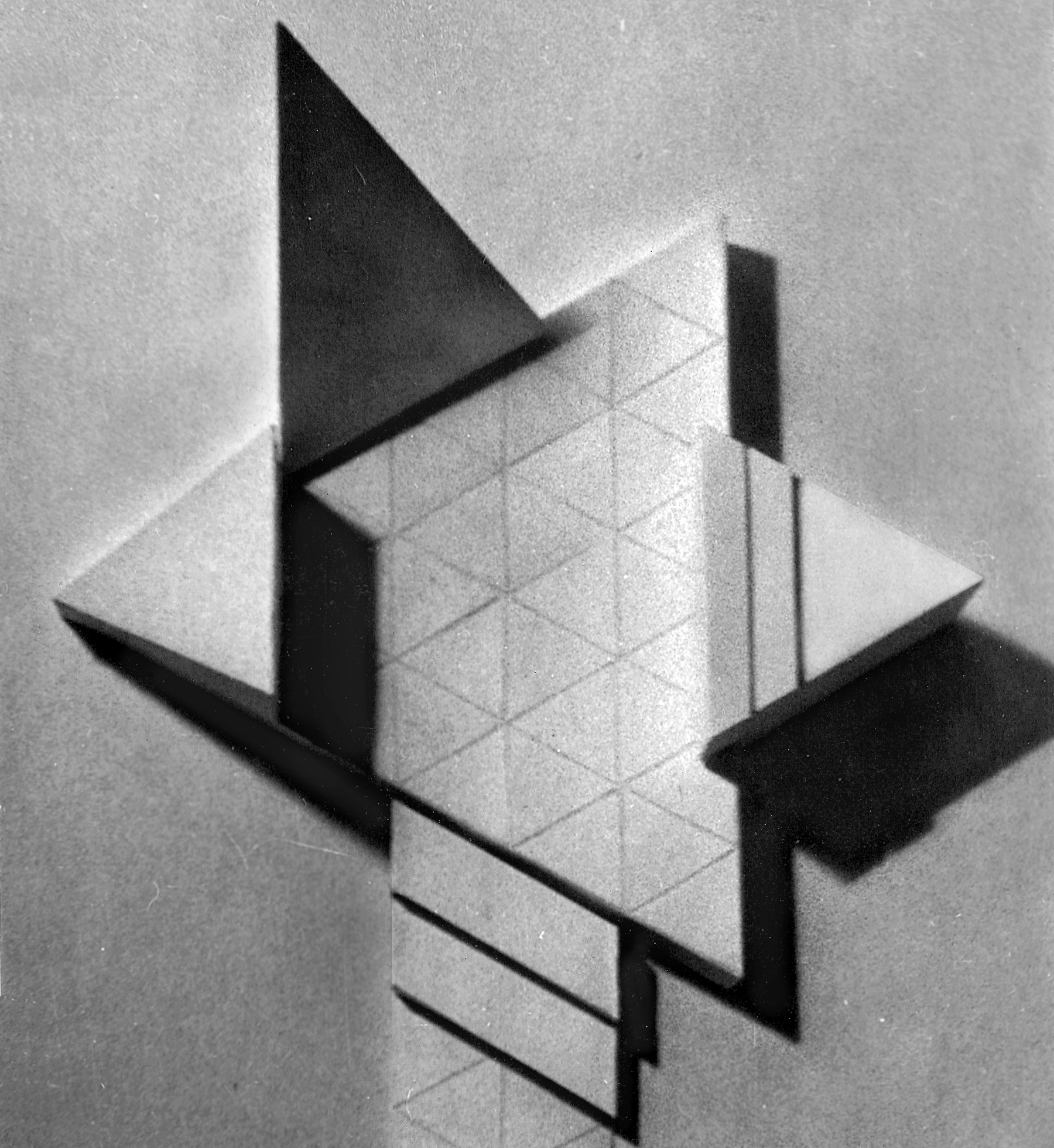
Tombstone. Model. Moscow, USSR, 1969

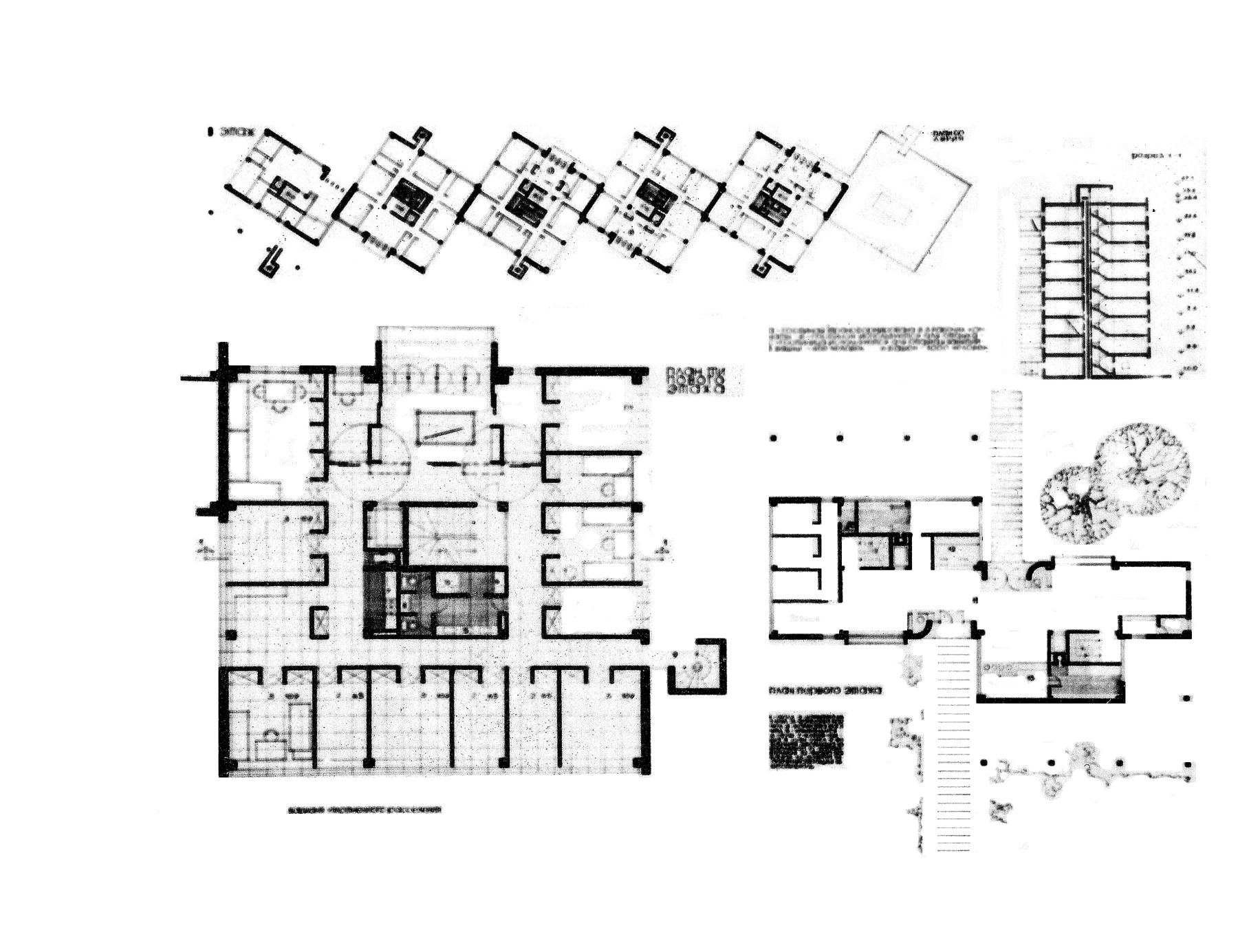
Prototype Dormitory. All-Union Competition Entry. USSR. 1966. First Prize

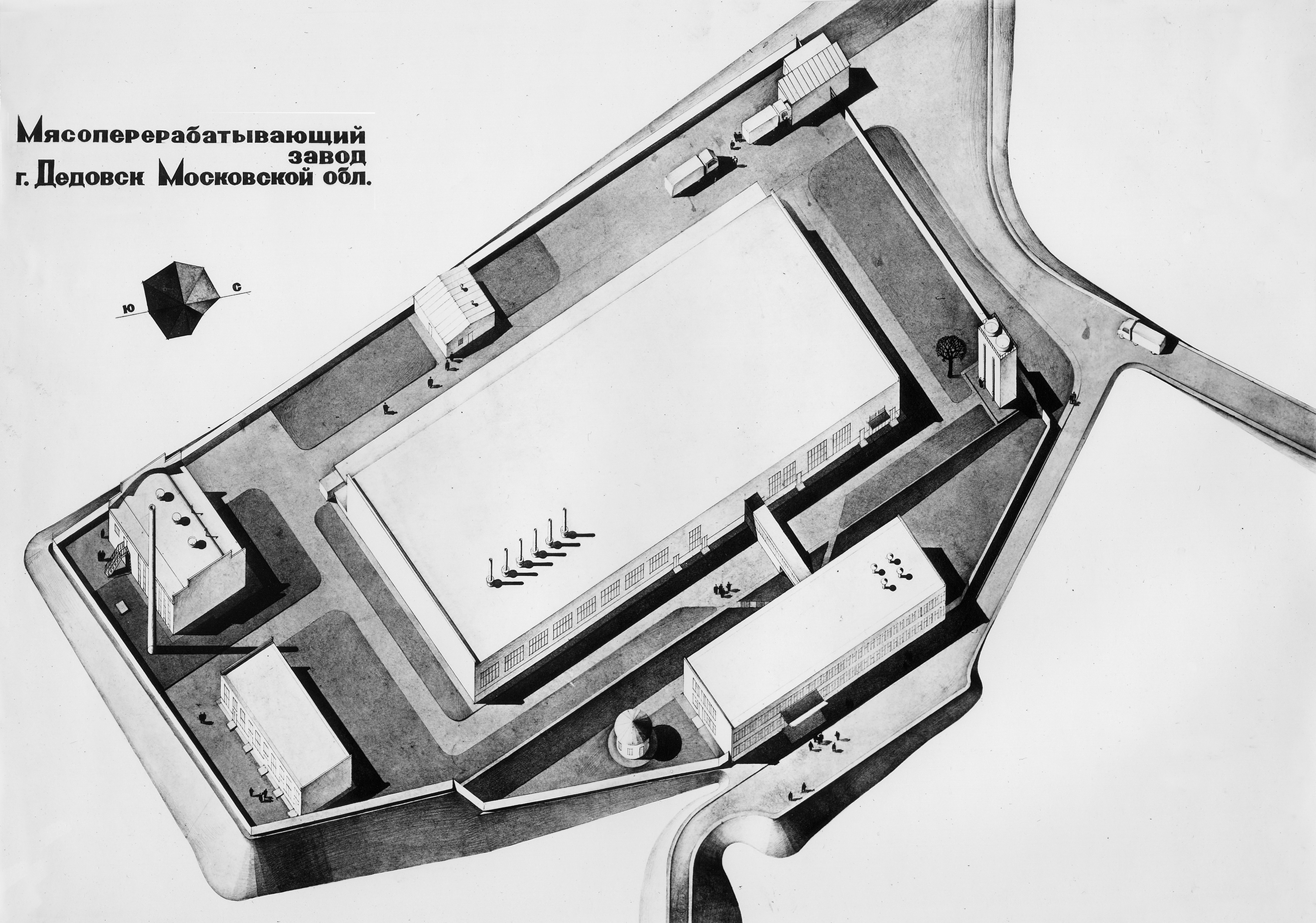
Meatpacking Plant. Axonometric view. Moscow Region, USSR, 1970

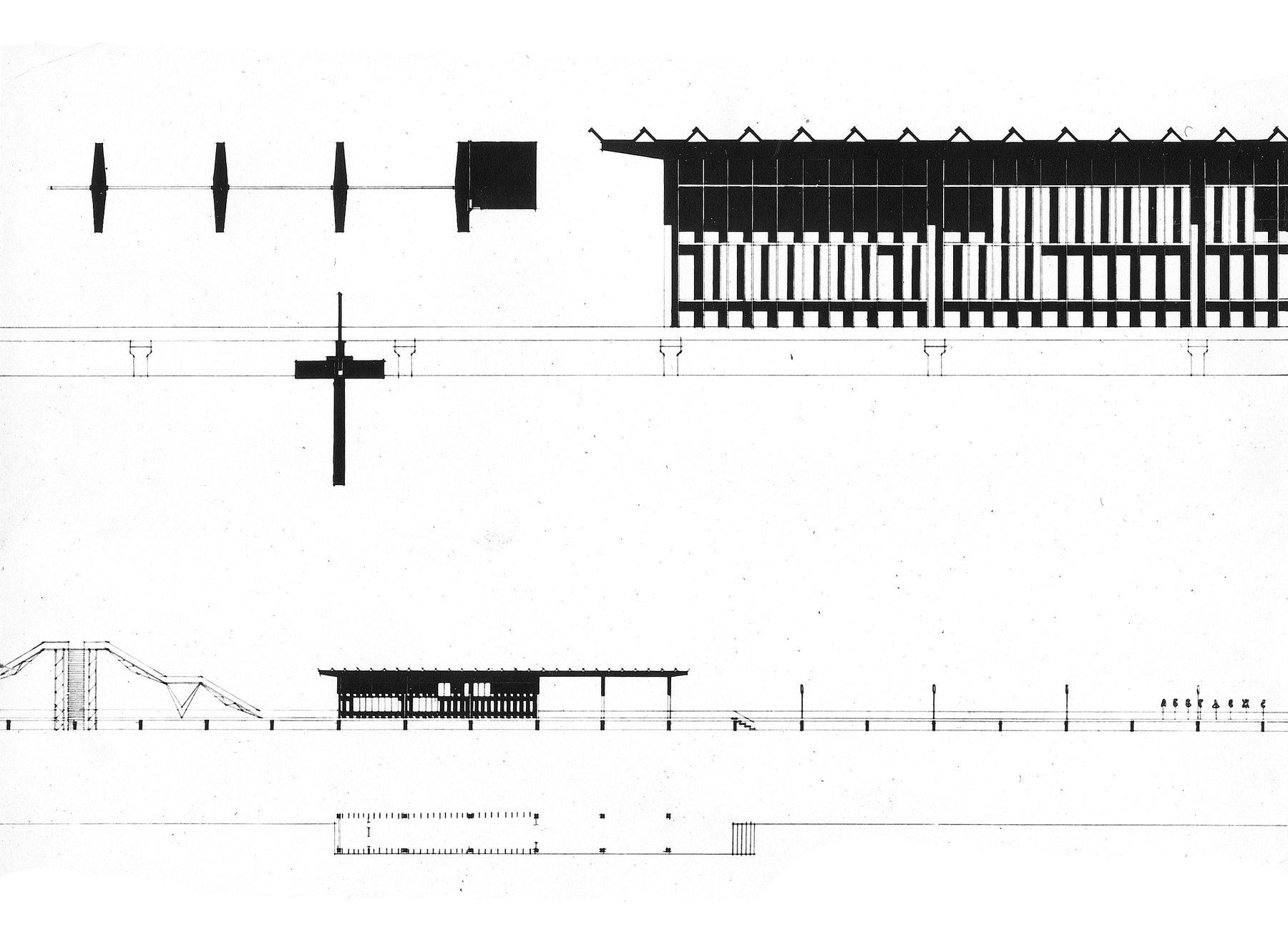
Prototype Railroad Stations. Moscow, USSR. 1961-1962

== Select publications ==
=== Books ===
- Summo, Nina, Berkovich, Gary. Sasha Frishman. Almaz, NY, 2025. ISBN 978-1-68082-059-1
- Two Lifetimes. Almaz, NY. 2025 ISBN 978-1-68082-057-7
- Jewish Architecture. Almaz, NY. 2024. ISBN 978-1-68082-053-9.
- Donchik. The Rinaissance Man. Almaz, NY. 2024. ISBN 978-1-68082-054-6.
- In the Trenches of Architecture. Almaz, NY. 2023. ISBN 979-8-89034-287-4.
- Berkovich, Gary, Berkovich, Jaime. Stan Berkovich. Almaz, NY. 2021. ISBN 978-1-68082-051-5.
- Reclaiming a History. Jewish Architects in Imperial Russia and the USSR. Weimar und Rostock: Grunberg Verlag. Volume 1. Late Imperial Russia: 1891–1917. 2021 ISBN 978-3-933713-61-2.
- Reclaiming a History. Jewish Architects in Imperial Russia and the USSR. Weimar und Rostock: Grunberg Verlag. Volume 2. Soviet Avant-garde: 1917–1933. 2021 ISBN 978-3-933713-63-6.
- Reclaiming a History. Jewish Architects in Imperial Russia and the USSR. Weimar und Rostock: Grunberg Verlag. Volume 3. Socialist Realism: 1933–1955. 2022 ISBN 978 3 933713 64 3.
- Reclaiming a History. Jewish Architects in Imperial Russia and the USSR. Weimar und Rostock: Grunberg Verlag. Volume 4. Modernized Socialist Realism: 1955–1991. 2022 ISBN 978-3-933713-65-0.
- Г. Беркович, Л. Нецветаев. Зодчий Дмитрий Радыгин. — Ульяновск: УлГТУ, 2017. — 125 с. — ISBN 978-5-9795-1751-3.
- Watching Communism Fail. McFarland. 2008. ISBN 978-0-7864-4139-6
- Подопытные (Human Subjects). Dubov Fund. Moscow, Russian Federation, 2006.
- Капитализм. Это Просто (Capitalism. It's simple). Dubov Fund. Moscow, USSR, 1991.
- "SOM Housing Guidelines". Chicago IL, USA. 1982.

=== Selected articles ===
- Jewish Architecture. 2023. https://www.academia.edu/101688171/Jewish_Architecture
- Modernized Socialist Realism in Soviet Architecture (1955-1991). 2019. https://www.academia.edu/41858215/Modernized_Socialist_Realism_in_Soviet_Architecture_1955_1991_
- Dom-Kommuna as Realization of Communist Beliefs in 1920's Soviet Union. 2018. https://www.academia.edu/42016381/Dom_Kommuna_as_Realization_of_Communist_Beliefs_in_1920s_Soviet_Union
- Беркович, Г. А. Архитектор-ученый: штрихи к портрету Александра Рябушина // Современная архитектура мира. Вып. 3 / НИИ теории и истории архитектуры и градостр-ва РААСН; отв. ред. Н. А. Коновалова. — М.; СПб. : Нестор-История, 2013. — С. 19–23. — ISBN 978-5-4469-0102-9.
- «Scaling the Peak Hong Kong». Inland Architect, 1984, no. 12.
- «Encountering the Constructivists». Inland Architect, 1981, no. 10.
- «The Russian Experience: Architecture and Energy». Inland Architect, 1981, no. 9.
- «Methodology for evaluating the quality of flexible layouts in apartments» («О методе оценки планировочного качества трансформируемых квартир»). Collection of research works: Problems of planning and development of rural settlements — design and construction of residential and institutional buildings (Вопросы планировки и застройки сельских населённых мест, проектирования и строительства жилых и общественных зданий), No 2, 1973, p. 141. УДК 711.4+728+725+69.
- «Comfort and convenience in apartment layout optimization» («К проблеме оптимизации планировочного комфорта жилища»). Collection of research works: Problems of planning and development of rural settlements — design and construction of residential and institutional buildings (Вопросы планировки и застройки сельских населённых мест, проектирования и строительства жилых и общественных зданий), No 1, 1972, p. 123. УДК 711.4+69+728.12.
- «Apartment Design Optimization» («Оптимизация планировочных решений квартиры»). Higher Education Institutions’ News. Building and architecture (Известия Высших Учебных Заведений. Строительство и Архитектура), 1966, No 6.

=== Book reviewing ===
- Юнаков О. Архитектор Иосиф Каракис. — Нью-Йорк: Алмаз, 2016. — 544 с. — ISBN 978-1-68082-000-3.
