= Newspaper production process =

Complex process

The newspaper production process begins with gathering news stories, articles, opinions, advertorials and advertisements to printing and folding of the hard copy. Usually, the news items are printed onto newsprint. The whole production process can be divided into four parts: Content gathering, Pre-press, Press and Post-press. The term production process should not be confused with manufacture as production process is the stage at which many taxes are levied and collected in almost all countries. Manufacture is the stage at which the product becomes marketable and therefore the term also includes the stages of packaging and packing.

== Content gathering ==
Typical newspaper content can be divided into two parts: News/Information and Advertisement.

News production starts with the reporters going out to their respective beat to gather stories and cover events and also the marketing department getting advertisement into the newspaper on daily basis. It starts with reporters getting their stories ready daily and sending their stories in electronically through their mails to the editor. Each reporter works with a particular desk in the newsroom, some of these desks are: Metro desk, Sport desk, Business desk, Political desk, Education desk and others. News gathering and dissemination is paramount to every newspaper as this is the responsibility of the newspaper house to the people and this can determine their level of advertiser's patronage. After stories are gathered, the Sub Editors are saddled with the responsibility of editing copies submitted by the reporter using a red pen or red font color, the Chief Sub Editor uses blue while the Editor uses green. This tells that each of the editing done on a particular story is still subjected to the final editing done by either the Chief Sub Editor or the Editor in chief.

Sources used include information provided by news agencies such as Reuters, Associated Press, etc. plus information available from the Internet. This can be from Government sources such as Government departments e.g. Companies House, commercial undertakings specialising in data collection and other specialist organisations. In addition, there are so-called social media outlets, not always known for their factual accuracy.

== Pre-press ==
Pre-press is where photos are edited, advertisements are created and composed and the whole pages of the newspapers are laid-out and designed.

After stories have been edited, the editor and other sub-editors will sit in an editorial conference to determine what goes inside the paper for the day. Then, each sub-editor is expected to plan his pages if possible. The marketing department also will forward the advertisements that have been paid for with specification of the pages allotted to the advert, all these will be forwarded to editorial department so as to add these pages in their planning process. The newspaper planning is done on a dummy sheet (a blank sheet folded as a pre-print test) to give a prototype of the final outlook of each pages, this is called page planning. After the planning, the editorial department forwards the already planned pages to the graphic section where the dummy sheets are transformed to a meaningful digital form. At the pre-press, text, pictures, cutline, graphics, and graphical illustrations as well as color are put together to form the newspaper pages. Smaller newspapers sometimes still use desktop publishing programs (DTP) such as Corel Draw, Adobe PageMaker, Adobe InDesign, Quark XPress and other graphic design software. This software enables the graphic designer to easily compose pages and output them on a hardcopy proof-printer for proofreading and sending the corrected and finished pages to a RIP (Raster Image Processor). The RIP transforms PostScript (PS/EPS) or PDF pages into rasterized TIFF G4 data. The TIFF data is usually imaged in a CTP-device using a Laser directly onto the offset printing plates. Earlier – and even sometimes nowadays – data imaging was done using a film-workflow. So the data was imaged at first onto a film and then the film was copied with UV-light onto UV-sensitive offset printing plates. The final stage in the newspaper pre-press phase is preparing the imaged offset printing plates for mounting onto the plate cylinder inside of the offset press. The plates have to be bent and often also punched so that they can be mounted easily and properly on the plate cylinder.

In order to produce good color quality newspaper follow WAN-IFRA and ISO standards namely ISO 12647-3 (2013) and Ifra Special Report 1-2008. Zeitungsdruck

== Press ==
The printing process is the main process step during newspaper production. Quickness and reliability with at the same time reasonable producing are the cornerstones in the production and processing of print products. Newspaper presses produce not just goods in process (sheets, signatures or reels of printout) as it is the case with typical printing presses. Instead newspaper rotary presses can produce copies which are finished goods.

The typical newspaper press is divided into two parts: printing and folding.

=== Printing ===
The first functions of a newspaper press are loading and unwinding of newsprint reels. These functions are provided by the paster. Pasters unwind paper reels and automatically change paper reels at full production speed (e.g. 100.000 copies per hour). Often pasters are placed below the printing towers. The towers often consist of four printing units to print Cyan, Magenta, Yellow and Black ink onto the newsprint. The newsprint web travels upwards in the printing tower during the color is applied to it on both sides of the reel. Usually, for every page there is one individual printing plate per color. This printing plate is mounted onto the plate cylinder within the printing unit which again is part of the printing tower. Modern presses can print full color on every page. Four color printing units are used for printing on one side of the paper web and another four printing units apply the backside print onto the paper web. Printing front and backside can happen simultaneously (blanket-to-blanket-configuration) or after another (satellite configuration) The printing units cannot just print one page like in digital printing, instead printing towers in newspaper presses can print up to 24 broadsheet pages in full color. If the press consists of several towers many more pages can be printed at once.

=== Folding ===
The folder starts where the printed webs come together. The folder can produce ribbons and combine these ribbons in the pages of the newspaper are separated from each other and the folder lays down the newspaper copies onto the delivery belt.

The first real newspaper presses were produced by Koenig & Bauer. The London-based The Times was printed at first on a rotary/flat machine press instead of a hand press during the night from 28 to 29 November 1819. Today also other manufacturers such as Goss, Manroland Web Systems, TKS, Mitsubishi and TPH are in the press market.

== Post-press ==
The copies are collected on the delivery belt and usually transported to the mailroom using a gripper conveyor system. The post-press area is also often called mailroom because here the copies are prepared for mailing to the customers. Newspaper copies can be bundled directly so that they are ready to be put into a truck for transportation. Alternatively, extra preprints from the newspaper press or flyers/brochures from external sources can inserted into the newspaper copies before creating bundles. Those who subscribed get them delivered on their doorstep. Mailroom systems are mostly manufactured by three companies (Ferag, Müller Martini and Schur).
