= Le Bassin aux Nymphéas =

1919 painting by Claude Monet

Le Bassin Aux Nymphéas
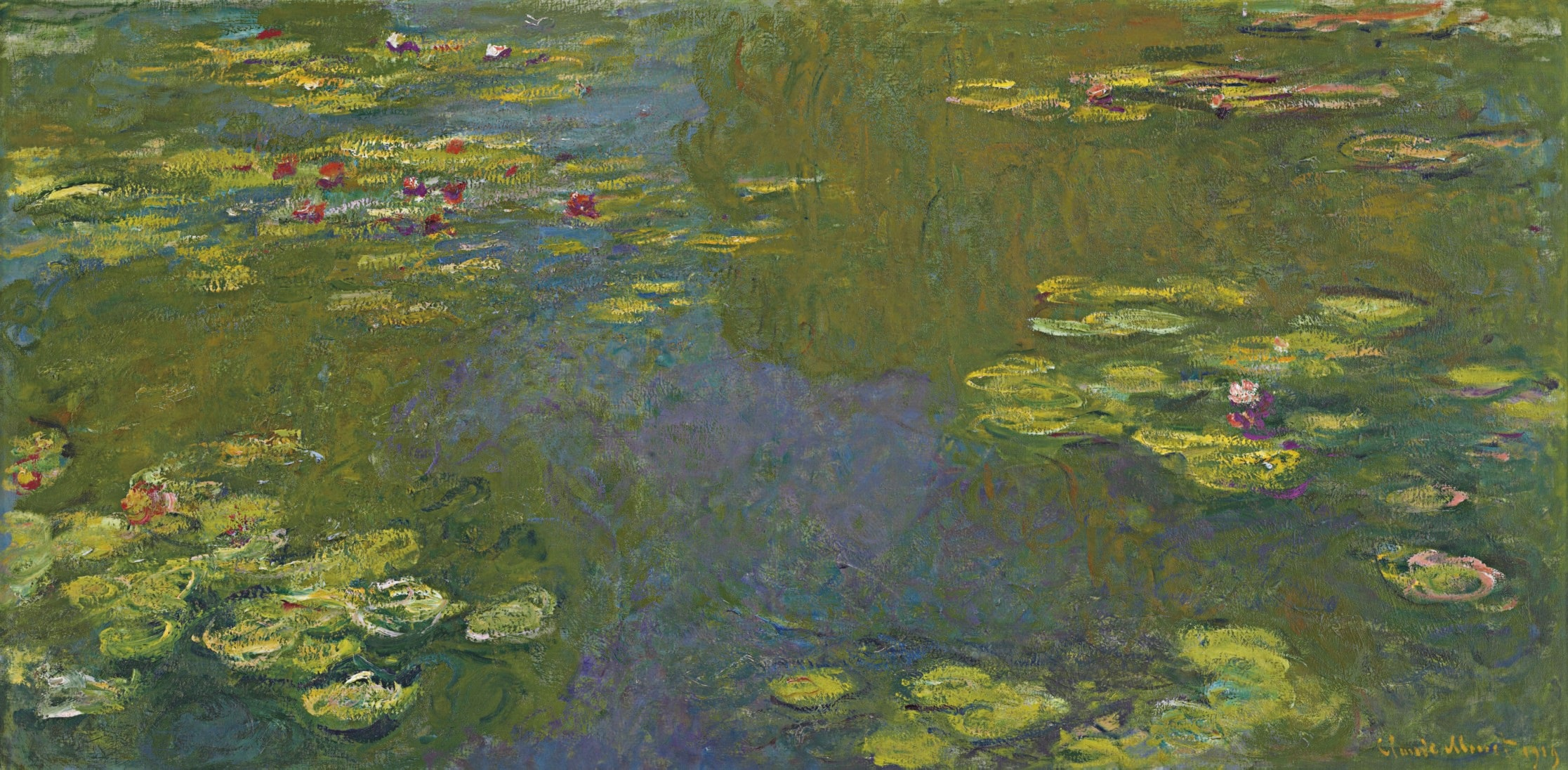
- Artist: Claude Monet
- Year: 1919
- Medium: Oil on canvas
- Dimensions: 100 cm × 201 cm (39 in × 79 in)

Le Bassin Aux Nymphéas (Water Lily Pond; 1919) is one of the series of Water Lilies paintings by French impressionist artist Claude Monet.

== Exhibited ==
- Paris, Galerie Bernheim-Jeune, Monet, January - February 1921, no. 44 or 45.
- Pittsburgh, Carnegie Institute, Art and Science in Gardens, June - July 1922, no. 101.
- New York, Durand Ruel Galleries, Waterlilies by Claude Monet, February 1924, no. 1-4.
- Paris, Galerie Durand-Ruel, Hommage à Claude Monet, 1926. Philadelphia, Arts Club, Monet, Memorial Exhibition, April 2001
- Sotheby's, New York, May 1971, (Auction Exhibition)
- London, Christie's, June 2008, (Auction Exhibition)
- Painted in 1919 in Giverny, it has been seen in public just once in the past 80 years.

== Provenance ==
- 1919 - acquired from the artist in November by Bernheim-Jeune, Paris
- 1921 - in January, is noted to be owned jointly by Bernheim-Jeune and Galerie Durand-Ruel, Paris
- 1922 - owned solely by Galerie Durand-Ruel, Paris (nos. 11874 and D13373), by 1922.
- Unknown - Jean d'Alayer (Mme d'Alayer, née Marie-Louise Durand-Ruel), Paris
- Unknown - Sam Salz, Inc., New York.
- 1968 - Mr and Mrs Norton Simon, Los Angeles, c. 1968
- 1971 - Sotheby's, New York, 5 May 1971, lot 41.
- 1971 - Mrs Elizabeth Clementine Miller Tangeman, Columbus, Indiana, acquired from the above for $320,000
- 1993 - J. Irwin and Xenia S. Miller, acquired from the above, August 1993; displayed at the Miller House
- 2008 - Christie's, London, 24 June 2008, lot 16. for £36.5m, overall price rose to over £40m with taxes.
- 2008 - Arts & Management International Ltd. for Private Collector

== Articles on this work ==
- M. Ciolkowska, "Monet: His Garden, His World", in International Studio, February 1923, no. 309, pp. 371–377 (illustrated p. 378).
- D. Rouart, J.-D. Rey & R. Maillard, Monet: Nymphéas, Paris, 1972, (illustrated p. 174).
- M. Hoog, Monet, Paris, 1978, no. 80 (illustrated).
- R. Gordon & C.F. Stuckey, "Blossoms and Blunders: Monet and the State", in Art in America, January - February 1979, p. 110.
- D. Wildenstein, Claude Monet: biographie et catalogue raisonné, vol. IV, 1899-1926, Lausanne and Paris, 1985, no. 1890, p. 288 (illustrated p. 289).
- D. Wildenstein, Claude Monet: catalogue raisonné, vol. IV, Cologne, 1996, no. 1890 (illustrated p. 897).
- S. Muchnic, Odd Man In: Norton Simon and the Pursuit of Culture, Berkeley and Los Angeles, 1998, pp. 192–193.
- P. Hayes Tucker, "The Revolution in the Garden: Monet in the Twentieth Century", in exh. cat., Monet in the Twentieth Century, Royal Academy of Arts, London, 1999, pp. 79 and 218.

== Posthumous Auction sales ==
- 1971 - Sotheby's, New York, May 1971, $320,000
- 2008 - Christie's, London, June 2008, $80,451,178 becoming an auction record for a painting by Claude Monet, and the second highest price for a work of art in Europe.

It was sold on 24 June 2008 at Christie's London auction rooms for £40.9m, a world record for a Monet painting.

== See also ==
- Nymphaeaceae (water lilies)
- List of most expensive paintings
- List of paintings by Claude Monet
