= List of works by Eero Saarinen =

This is a list of houses, commercial buildings, educational facilities, furniture designs, and other structures designed by Finnish-American architect Eero Saarinen (1910–1961). Many of Saarinen's early designs were in collaboration with his father Eliel Saarinen. Only after his father died in 1950 did Saarinen design buildings on his own in earnest. During his career, he designed buildings for large corporations such as Bell Labs, IBM, CBS, and General Motors. In addition, he designed several airport terminals and university buildings, along with numerous structures for the businessman J. Irwin Miller. When Saarinen died suddenly in 1961, ten of his buildings were still under development.

== Buildings and structures ==
List of buildings and structures designed by Eero Saarinen
Name	City	State/Country	Designed	Completed	Notes	Image
Hvitträsk Studio and Home	Kirkkonummi	Finland	1929	1937	Remodel	
Swedish Theatre	Helsinki	Finland	1935	1936	Remodel. With Eliel Saarinen	
Fenton Community Center	Fenton	Michigan	1937	1938	With Eliel Saarinen	
J. F. Spencer House	Huntington Woods	Michigan	1937	1938	First building designed independently	
J.K. Nikander Hall	Hancock	Michigan		1939	First building Saarinen designed within Michigan's Copper Country. Designed in conjunction with his father, Eliel Saarinen.	
Charles and Ingrid Koebel House	Grosse Pointe Farms	Michigan	1937	1940	With Eliel Saarinen and J. Robert F. Swanson	
Kleinhans Music Hall	Buffalo	New York	1938	1940	With Eliel Saarinen. Designated a National Historic Landmark in 1989	
Crow Island School	Winnetka	Illinois	1938	1942	With Eliel Saarinen and Perkins&Will. Designated a National Historic Landmark in 1990	
Berkshire Music Center buildings	Lenox	Massachusetts	1938	1959	Tanglewood Shed in 1938 (with Eliel Saarinen and Joseph Franz), Chamber Music Shed in 1947 (with Eliel Saarinen), Edmund Haws Talbot Orchestra Canopy in 1959	
Center Line Defense Housing	Center Line	Michigan	1941	1942	With Eliel Saarinen and J. Robert F. Swanson. 477 housing units	
Albert and Muriel Wermuth House	Fort Wayne	Indiana	1941	1942		
Willow Lodge	Willow Run	Michigan	1942	1943	Demolished	
Lincoln Heights Housing	Washington	District of Columbia	1944	1946	With Eliel Saarinen and J. Robert F. Swanson.	
Hugh Taylor Birch Hall at Antioch College	Yellow Springs	Ohio	1944	1947	With Eliel Saarinen and J. Robert F. Swanson.	
Des Moines Art Center	Des Moines	Iowa	1944	1948	With Eliel Saarinen and J. Robert F. Swanson. Listed on the National Register of Historic Places in 2004	
Case Study House#9	Pacific Palisades	California	1945	1949	With Charles Eames. Saarinen also provided an original plan for House#8, but Eames completely redesigned it. Listed on the National Register of Historic Places in 2013	
Birmingham High School	Birmingham	Michigan	1945	1952	With Eliel Saarinen and J. Robert F. Swanson	
Drake University plan and buildings	Des Moines	Iowa	1945	1957	Harvey Ingham Hall of Science, Fitch Hall of Pharmacy, Women's Dormitory & Dining Hall (all in 1945 with Eliel Saarinen and J. Robert F. Swanson), Bible School & Prayer Chapel in 1952, Women's Dormitory #4 in 1957, Jewett Union addition in 1957	
Christ Church Lutheran	Minneapolis	Minnesota	1947	1949	With Eliel Saarinen; solo addition in 1962. Designated a National Historic Landmark in 2009.	
Eero Saarinen House	Bloomfield Hills	Michigan	1947	1959	Renovation of a Victorian house	
Gateway Arch	St. Louis	Missouri	1947	1965	Designated a National Historic Landmark in 1987	
UAW–CIO Cooperative	Flint	Michigan	1948	1948	Renovation. Demolished.	
General Motors Technical Center	Warren	Michigan	1948	1956	Designated a National Historic Landmark in 2014	
Aspen Music Center	Aspen	Colorado	1949	1949	With Eliel Saarinen. Demolished in 1963.	
Brandeis University plan and buildings	Waltham	Massachusetts	1949	1952	With Matthew Nowicki. Ridgewood Quadrangle Dormitories (1950), Hamilton Quadrangle Dormitory & Student Center (1952), Sherman Student Center (1952) (three remodeled, one demolished)	
Loja Saarinen House	Bloomfield Hills	Michigan	1950	1950	House for Saarinen's widowed mother	
J. Irwin and Xenia Miller Cottage	District of Muskoka	Ontario	1950	1952	The first of four buildings Saarinen designed for J. Irwin Miller. Occupied by Miller and his wife Xenia, it had an organic design.	
Irwin Union Bank and Trust	Columbus	Indiana	1950	1954	The second of four buildings Saarinen designed for J. Irwin Miller. Saarinen designed Irwin Union Bank and Trust's one-story bank and an adjacent three-story office wing. The building was designated a National Historic Landmark in 2000.	
Massachusetts Institute of Technology buildings	Cambridge	Massachusetts	1950	1955	MIT Chapel and Kresge Auditorium	
University of Michigan School of Music	Ann Arbor	Michigan	1951	1956		
Milwaukee County War Memorial	Milwaukee	Wisconsin	1952	1957		Eero Saarinen architecture
Eero Saarinen & Associates Building	Bloomfield Hills	Michigan	1953	1953		
Firestone Baars Chapel, Stephens College	Columbia	Missouri	1953	1956		
Miller House	Columbus	Indiana	1953	1957	The third of four buildings Saarinen designed for J. Irwin Miller. Occupied by the family of Miller and his wife Xenia, it was designated a National Historic Landmark in 2000.	
Concordia Senior College	Fort Wayne	Indiana	1953	1958		
Emma Hartman Noyes House at Vassar College	Poughkeepsie	New York	1954	1958		
United States Chancellery Building	Oslo	Norway	1955	1959		
United States Chancellery Building	London	England	1955	1960		
University of Chicago plan and buildings	Chicago	Illinois	1955	1960	Women's Dormitory & Dining Hall (1958; demolished 2001), Law School (1960)	
David S. Ingalls Rink	New Haven	Connecticut	1956	1958		
IBM Manufacturing & Training Facility	Rochester	Minnesota	1956	1958		
TWA Terminal	New York City	New York	1956	1962	Listed on the National Register of Historic Places in 2005	
Hill College House (Hill Hall)	Philadelphia	Pennsylvania	1957	1960	undergraduate dormitories at the University of Pennsylvania	
IBM Thomas J. Watson Research Center	Yorktown Heights	New York	1957	1961		
Bell Telephone Corporate Laboratories	Holmdel	New Jersey	1957	1962		
Deere & Co. Administrative Center	Moline	Illinois	1957	1963		
Ezra Stiles & Morse Colleges	New Haven	Connecticut	1958	1962		
Dulles International Airport Main Terminal	Chantilly	Virginia	1958	1963	The original terminal of Dulles International Airport, it was Saarinen's only Virginia work. The structure is built with a concave roof and mobile lounges that ferried passengers directly to planes.	
Vivian Beaumont Repertory Theater & Lincoln Center for the Performing Arts Library & Museum	New York City	New York	1958	1965	A Broadway and off-Broadway theater complex housed in the same building as the New York Public Library's Performing Arts Library, designed by Gordon Bunshaft. Saarinen designed the Broadway theater and one of the off-Broadway theaters.	
North Christian Church	Columbus	Indiana	1959	1964	The last of four buildings Saarinen designed for J. Irwin Miller. The building has a hexagonal footprint and prominent spire. It was designated a National Historic Landmark in 2000.	
Hamden Office	Hamden	Connecticut	1960	1961	A renovation of Lucerne, a mansion designed in 1906 by Brown and Von Beren. It was adapted to serve as a headquarters for Saarinen & Associates, but the project was not completed until after Saarinen's death in 1961.	
Saarinen House	New Haven	Connecticut	1960	1961	A renovation of a Tudor Revival house that Saarinen bought for himself after being hired by Yale University; the project was not completed until after Saarinen died.	
CBS Building	New York City	New York	1960	1965	The only skyscraper designed by Saarinen, it was built as a CBS corporate headquarters. It is a New York City designated landmark.	
Ellinikon Airport East Terminal	Athens	Greece	1960	1969	Saarinen designed the east terminal, which was abandoned after 2001 and later converted into a park.	

== Furniture and furnishings ==
List of furniture and furnishings designed by Eero Saarinen
Name	Designed	Completed	Notes	Image
Cranbrook School for Boys furnishings, Bloomfield Hills, Michigan	1925	1931	With Eliel Saarinen	
Saarinen House furnishings, Bloomfield Hills, Michigan	1928	1930		
Kingswood School for Girls furnishings, Bloomfield Hills, Michigan	1929	1931		
Pedestal Series	1954	1957	Furniture design for Knoll Associates. Includes the tulip chair	
Grasshopper Chair	1943	1946	Chair design for Knoll Associates	
Models 71 and 73	1945	1950	Chair design for Knoll Associates	
Womb Chair & Ottoman	1946	1948	Chair design for Knoll Associates	

== Sources ==
- Merkel, Jayne (2005). Eero Saarinen. Phaidon. ISBN 978-0-7148-6592-8. OCLC 57750853.
- Pelkonen, Eeva-Liisa; Albrecht, Donald, eds. (2006). Eero Saarinen: Shaping the Future. Yale University Press. ISBN 978-0-300-12237-4.
- Román, Antonio (2003). Eero Saarinen: an Architecture of Multiplicity. Princeton Architectural Press. ISBN 1-56898-340-9. OCLC 50644049.
