= Miller House (Columbus, Indiana) =

Historic house in Indiana, United States

- U.S. National Register of Historic Places
- U.S. National Historic Landmark
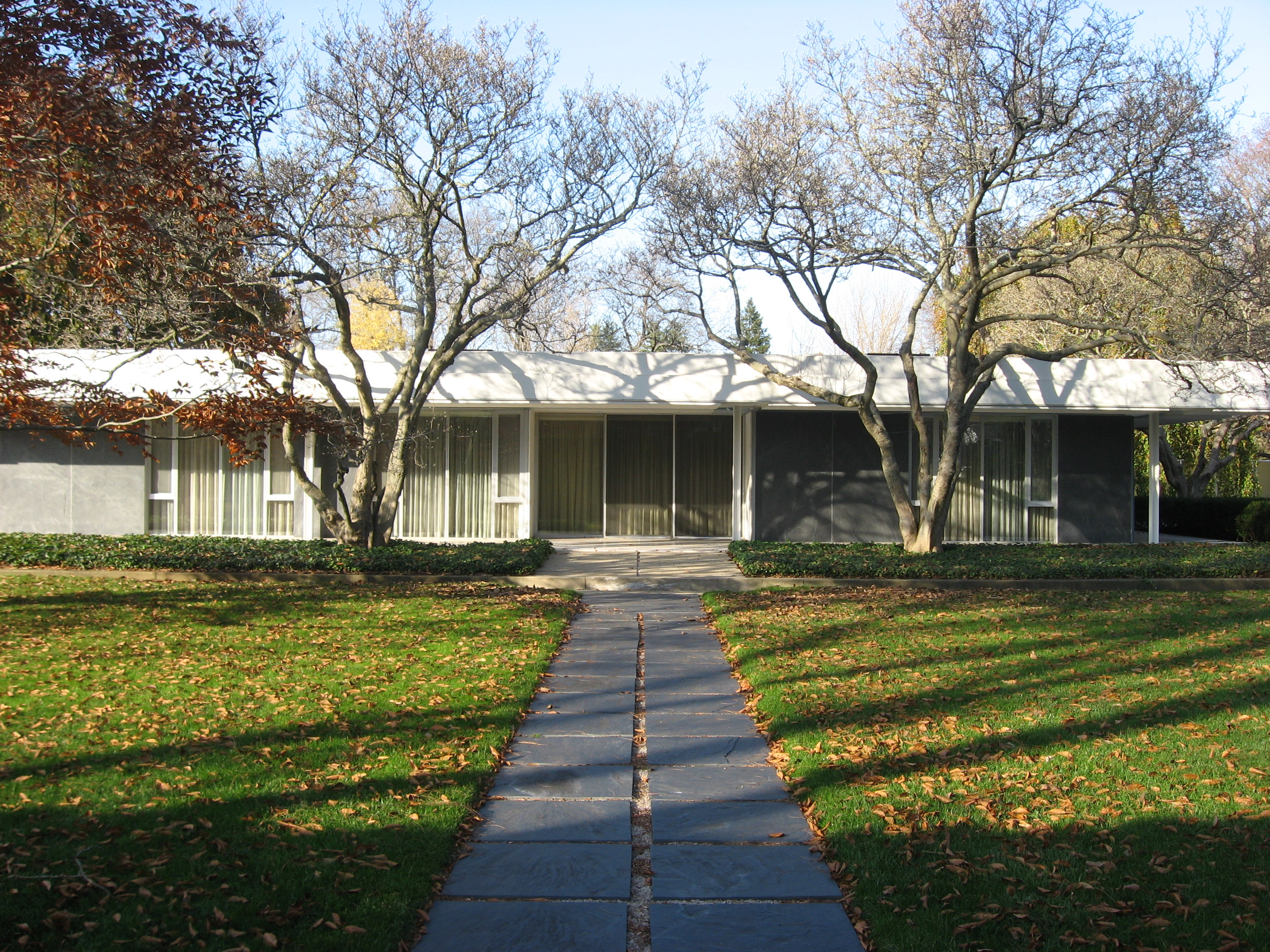
- Southern entrance

- Location within Bartholomew County, Indiana Location within Indiana Location within the United States
- Location: 2760 Highland Way, Columbus, Indiana
- Coordinates: 39°13′38″N 85°55′23″W
- Area: 13.5 acres (5.5 ha) (estate), 6,838 ft^{2} (635.3 m^{2}) (house)
- Architect: Eero Saarinen (main architect); Kevin Roche (associate); Dan Kiley (landscape architect); Alexander Girard (interior, furnishings)
- MPS: Modernism in Architecture, Landscape Architecture, Design, and Art in Bartholomew County, 1942–1965 MPS
- NRHP reference No.: 00000706

Significant dates
- Added to NRHP: May 16, 2000
- Designated NHL: May 16, 2000

The Miller House and Garden is a historic house museum at 2760 Highland Way in Columbus, Indiana, United States. It was designed by Eero Saarinen as a mid-century modern residence for the family of the businessman J. Irwin Miller and his wife Xenia Simons Miller. The interior designer Alexander Girard, the landscape architect Dan Kiley, and Saarinen's associate Kevin Roche assisted with various parts of the design. The house and gardens, owned by the Indianapolis Museum of Art (IMA) since 2009, are designated as a National Historic Landmark. Both the house and the gardens have been praised for their design over the years.

The 13.5-acre (5.5 ha) plot of land, bounded by the Flatrock River on the west and Washington Street on the east, includes a meadow, two allées, and groves of trees. Kiley designed the landscape as an extension of the home, loosely divided into three sections extending from the house. The Miller House itself is a single-story house on a terrace, covered by a flat roof. It covers 6,838 square feet (635.3 m^{2}) with six bedrooms. Inside, four zones branch off from a central living room that features a conversation pit. These four zones include rooms for parents, children, guests and servants, and service areas. Girard designed furnishings and furniture for the house, and the Millers displayed their art collection there.

After Miller acquired the site in September 1953, he commissioned Saarinen for the project, commencing a two-year design process. The Taylor Brothers Construction Company began constructing the house in 1955, and the Millers began moving into the house in March 1957. Over the years, the Millers hosted many meetings and social gatherings at the house. The Millers made several changes to the original design, including removing an interior wall to enlarge a room. Though the Miller children gradually moved out of the house, their parents continued to live there for the rest of their lives; Irwin Miller died in the house in 2004, followed by Xenia Miller in 2008. After the IMA acquired the house, the property was renovated, opening to the public in May 2011.

== Site ==
The Miller House and Garden are located at 2760 Highland Way in Columbus, Indiana, United States. The plot of land, bounded by the Flatrock River on the west and Washington Street on the east, is rectangular and measures 13.5 acres (5.5 ha). (Note: Some sources give a different figure of 13 acres (5.3 ha).) A meadow slopes down to the west, toward the river, which is about 800 feet (240 m) away. The house itself is situated on a hillside, where the land abruptly descends about 30 feet (9.1 m). For privacy, the house was approached from a side street (Highland Way) rather than directly from the busier Washington Street, and the front door was positioned away from the street. A service passageway leads to Washington Street, which is one full block away.

=== Landscape features ===
The garden around the house was designed by the landscape architect Dan Kiley, who had worked with the house's architect Eero Saarinen on the Gateway Arch in St. Louis, Missouri. Kiley's design was a modernist adaptation of formal European gardens, which are generally symmetrical and geometric, and was inspired by the patches of farmland he saw on his flights to Columbus. The design continues the architectural elements of the house and was intended to provide privacy, color, and distinctive decorations to the property without intruding on the landscape or blocking off neighbors. Kiley used architectural terms to describe his design, for instance likening his allées to balustrades. Although the house was intended as a private residence, Kiley had intended the grounds as "an element of the greater assemblage of Columbus' modern architecture" from the outset. Gregg Bleam, who worked on the project with Kiley, described the design as "garden, meadow, and wood".

==== Allées ====
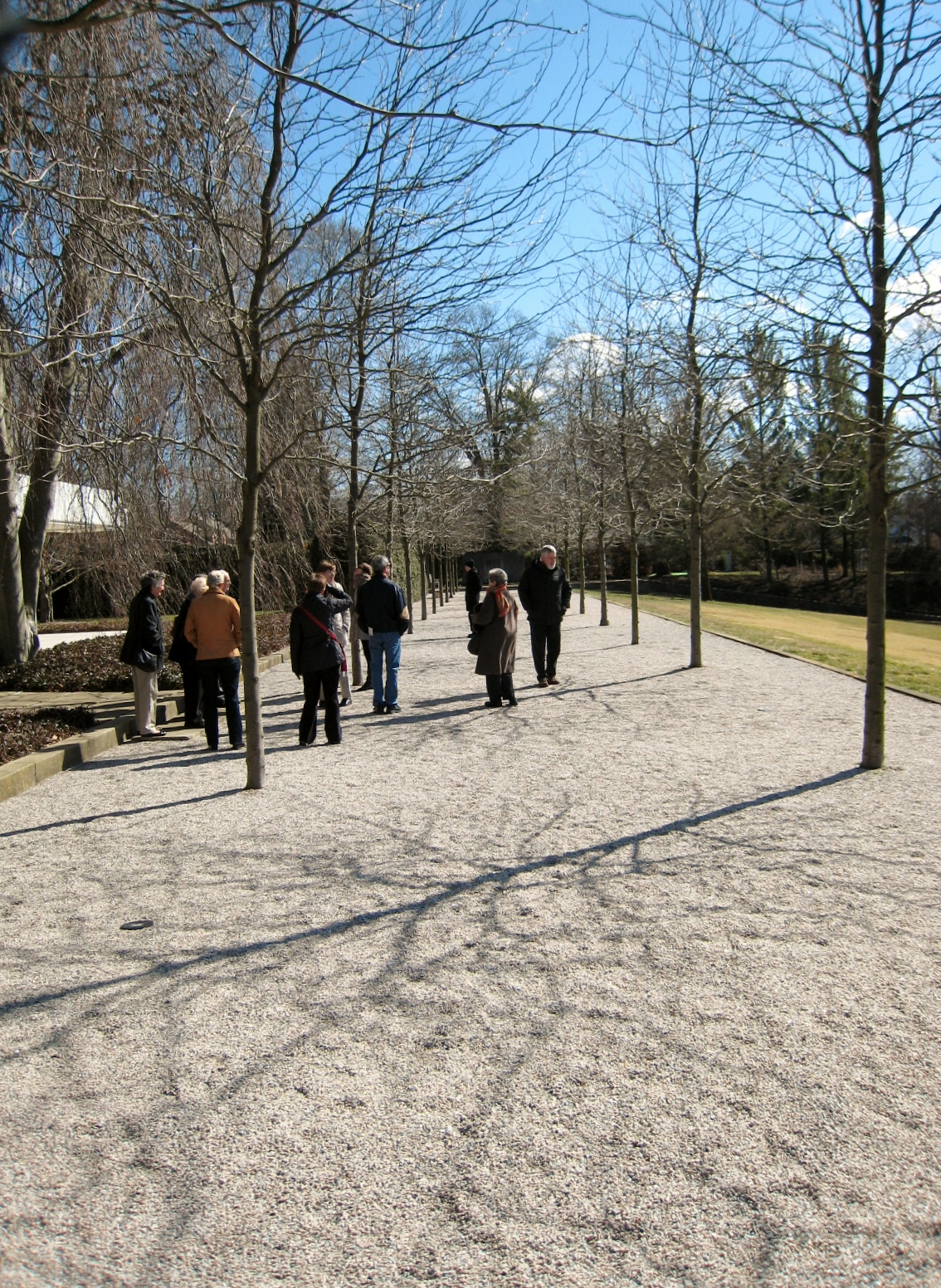
Looking south at the western allée of the house during the winter

The main entrance allée, originally made of horse chestnut trees, lines Highland Way, the access driveway that extends south of the house. The horse chestnut trees were later replaced with yellow buckeyes. As visitors travel north along Highland Way, the house appears gradually behind the trees; a pathway continues north on the same axis, running east of the house. A west–east allée, with three rows of trees, runs westward to the river, originating on the southern facade of the house. This contrasted with traditional allées, which often led to formal lawns.

Yet another allée, composed of two rows of honey locust trees, runs along the west side of the house. This allée, which is intended to shade the house, separates the house on one side from the meadow and river on the other. For visual consistency, all of the trees in the western allée are typically replaced even if only a few trees die or are damaged. Crushed stone surrounds the trees in the western allée. In contrast to traditional allées, which terminate at a building, the western allée is bisected by the house, continuing north and south from either end. Art was displayed at each end of the western allée when the Millers lived there; the north end contained Henry Moore's sculpture Draped Reclining Woman, while the south end included a bas relief by Jacques Lipchitz.

==== Terrace and groves ====
The house sits on a platform that extends 25 feet (7.6 m) outward from the house's footprint, creating a terrace garden. The platform measures 9 inches (230 mm) thick. Within the platform, a 10-foot-wide (3.0 m) outdoor terrace made of terrazzo abuts the house on all sides. Ivy plantings extend a further 15 feet (4.6 m) from the terrace, where a slate coping surrounds the terrace. Kiley's original plan called for the terrace to extend the platform's entire 25-foot width, but he scaled it back to 10 feet, allowing greenery to be planted closer to the house.

The garden's design emphasized the placement of the plantings over the actual species used there; the boundaries between zones were delineated by changes in the density and spacing between different plantings. The garden is arranged in several overlapping grids in a manner evoking Columbus's street grid. Hedges, bosques, allées, groves, and flat surfaces such as lawns were used to delineate the different parts of the grid. The three allées themselves divide the gardens around the house into four room-like sections. The sections are arranged in a spiraling or pinwheel configuration, similar to how the interior of the house is divided into rectangular zones. The north, east, and south sections of the garden respectively correspond to the parents' zone, the service area, and the children's zone of the house. The plantings were placed strategically to protect the interiors from the elements.

The house's primary gardens are surrounded by a pair of parallel arborvitae hedges, planted in the shape of offset dashed lines. East of the house are two rows of large oak trees. There are orchards both to the north and south of the house. The orchard to the north (adjoining the parents' bedroom) was originally planted with redbuds, which were later replaced with crabapples; these are interspersed with a multicolored checkerboard of stone floor tiles. In the southwest corner is a swimming pool and a recreational court, which abuts the children's bedrooms and is surrounded by a hedge. Tulips—among the favorite plants of Xenia Miller, one of the house's original residents—were also planted in the garden. Kiley re-graded the meadow west of the house so it descended at a constant angle, though he did not modify the landscape on the river, at the far western reaches of the site. A pair of weeping beeches delineates one side of the meadow, shading the house from the west.

=== Other structures ===
After the house was completed, Roche-Dinkeloo (a successor to Saarinen's firm) had considered constructing a glass pavilion at the western allée's northern end. The pavilion plans were canceled when Draped Reclining Woman was acquired in 1971. During the Miller family's ownership of the house, in 1966, they also acquired a 5.5-acre (2.2 ha) lot to the south, with a barn and another house for their servants.

== Architecture ==
The Miller House is one of the very few single-family homes designed by Eero Saarinen, (Note: Román 2003, p. 76 cites the Miller House as one of two single-family houses Saarinen ever designed, aside from the Entenza House, while Robert Campbell called it Saarinen's only residential design. The Miller family's Ontario vacation home was also designed by Saarinen; Paul Goldberger describes the Millers' two houses as Saarinen's only single-family residential designs.) as he typically specialized in larger buildings. Other figures involved in the house's design include the interior designer Alexander Girard, who worked closely with the Millers to furnish the residence; the landscape architect Dan Kiley; and Saarinen's associate Kevin Roche. S. R. Lewis & Associates were the building's mechanical engineers. Architectural drawings credit Saarinen and Girard equally with the design, and Kiley did not join the project until the house's blueprints were largely complete. The house's exterior, interior, and gardens were all designed in tandem, so the different parts of the design all related to one another. Like the gardens outside, the house's layout and materials deviated from architectural norms of the time. The Miller House, whose architecture followed the design philosophy of Ludwig Mies van der Rohe, is an example of the modernist International Style.

The Miller House is one of seven buildings in Columbus designated as National Historic Landmarks. The others are The Republic Building, the Mabel McDowell Adult Education Center, the Irwin Union Bank Building, the North Christian Church, the First Christian Church, and the First Baptist Church. Of these buildings, the Miller House is one of three designed by Saarinen, the others being the Irwin Union Bank Building and North Christian Church. The house was the third of four buildings that Saarinen designed for the family of J. Irwin Miller, after a 1952 cottage in Canada and the Irwin Union Bank.

=== Exterior ===
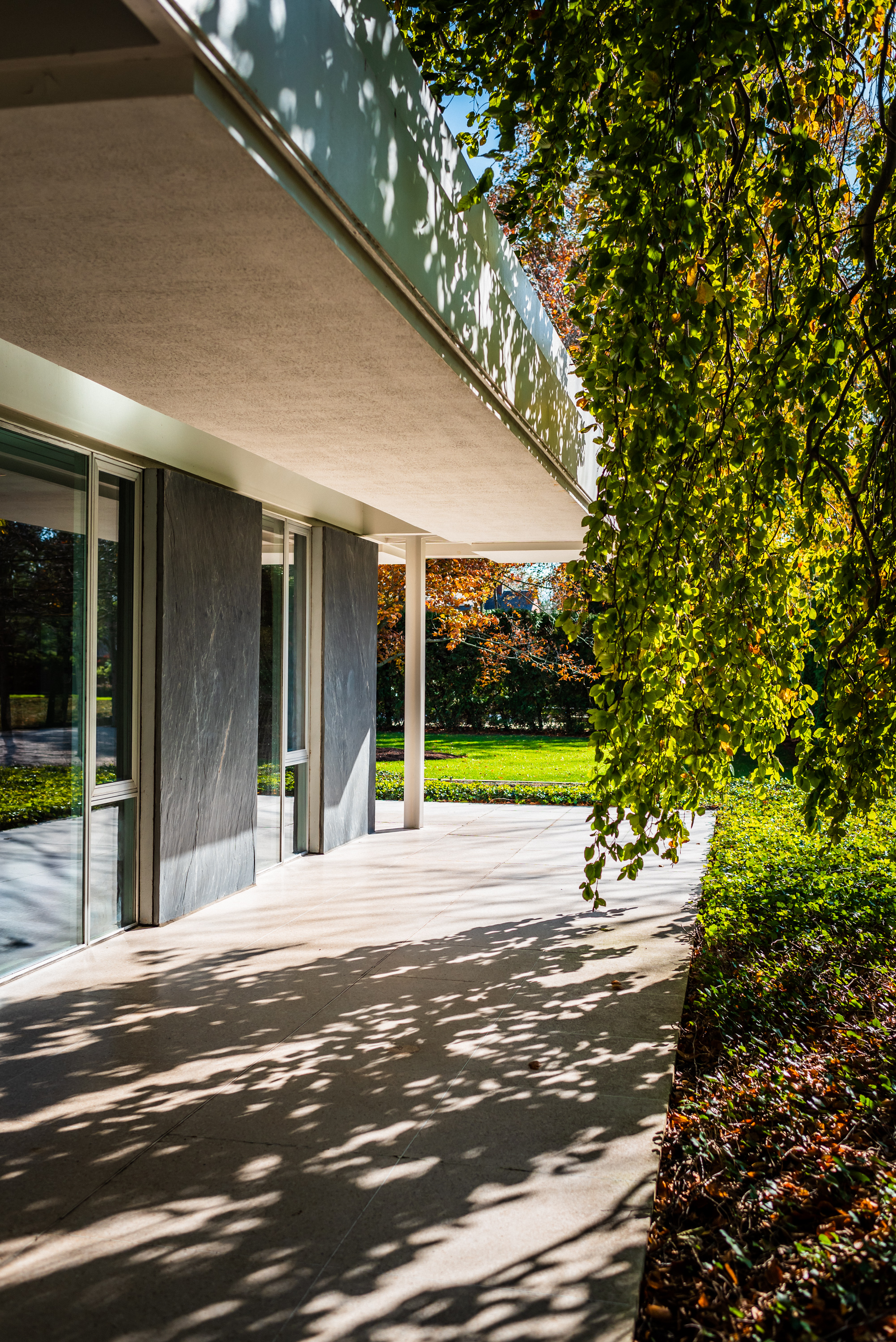
View of the facade, seen from the terrace outside the house

The house is one story high and has concrete-block perimeter walls clad in slate. Each slab of slate measures 5 by 8.5 feet (1.5 by 2.6 m) across, while the concrete-block walls behind it are 8 inches (200 mm) thick. Large windows are interspersed throughout the facade, overlooking many of the rooms. There are loggias on three elevations of the facade. The main entrance, on the southern elevation, is shaded by magnolia trees and leads into one side of the house's living room.

The roof is rectangular and is cited as measuring 100 by 120 feet (30 by 37 m) across. It has several skylights, and it is pitched at a slight angle to provide adequate drainage. The eaves at the roof's perimeter protrude 10 feet (3.0 m) outward from the house, overhanging the terrace. The eaves are interspersed with a band of skylights, which continue uninterrupted along the perimeter of the house. The skylights helped illuminate the facade with natural light, since the facade would have otherwise been shaded by the eaves, and they also visually marked the transition between the exterior and interior.

=== Interior ===
The Miller House covers 6,838 square feet (635.3 m^{2}), (Note: Also cited as 6,700 square feet (620 m^{2}) or 6,800 square feet (630 m^{2})) occupying much of a rectangle that measures roughly 80 by 100 feet (24 by 30 m) across. It has six bedrooms. The floors are made of travertine in the living room and terrazzo in other rooms. The interior walls are made of marble; they have few decorative elements, creating a background upon which the Miller family could display items such as heirlooms and art. Windows, doors, and panels are trimmed with aluminum, and a myriad of brass decorations is scattered around the house. The mechanical system initially included a boiler (which treated water from the water-supply system), air filter, air-handling unit, air-cooling system, and thermostat system. There was also a radiant heating system and an underfloor air distribution system divided into multiple sectors. These pieces of equipment have been gradually replaced over the years. There is a basement for mechanical equipment and storage.

The floor plan is arranged into nine bays. The corners of the bays are delineated by sixteen freestanding, cruciform steel columns in a 4×4 arrangement, which support the ceiling. The columns are covered in white enamel paint, and the capitals atop each column are flared outward. The spaces are generally lit by skylights, since Xenia disliked excessive natural light. The skylights in the ceiling are held in place by pairs of steel beams, a design feature suggested by Roche; they illuminate all parts of the house except for the bedrooms. The ceiling is generally 8.5 feet (2.6 m) high. It remains level above the sunken conversation pit, which is 1.5 feet (0.46 m) beneath the rest of the floor. The skylights around the living room are made of frosted glass, and fluorescent tubes are placed at the edges of each skylight, providing artificial light at night. Additional spotlights are concealed in the ceiling.

==== Rooms ====
The living room in the central bay is surrounded by four zones (one at each corner), each serving a different function. (Note: The zones are variously referred to as "clusters", "corner elements", "houses", or "nodes". In this article, they are described as "zones" for consistency.) Moving counterclockwise from the northwest corner, these are the parents', children's, and guest–servant zones, and a servant zone with spaces such as the laundry and kitchen. The service spaces and guest–servant zones are placed near the house's entrance, since they had a communal function, while the parents' and children's zones were placed in the rear, for privacy. Semi-open plan spaces between each zone (the sitting room–den to the south, the dining area to the north, and the entrance to the east) lead to the outdoor terraces. The zones' arrangement is similar to Andrea Palladio's 16th-century Villa La Rotonda, where the rooms are also arranged around a central space, though the Miller House's zones are arranged in a pinwheel configuration. The plan avoids a conventional axial organization, in which rooms are arranged according to their importance, and the layout is not a fully open plan, unlike similar modernist houses.

===== Living room =====
The living room is a 30-by-40-foot (9.1 by 12.2 m) space inspired by Midwestern farmhouses. It is delineated by an uninterrupted band of skylights on its ceiling; this band is 10 feet (3.0 m) high, slightly above the rest of the ceiling. There is also a fireplace, with a cylindrical shaft suspended from the ceiling, designed by Balthazar Korab. A storage wall and sunken conversation pit are also in the living room.

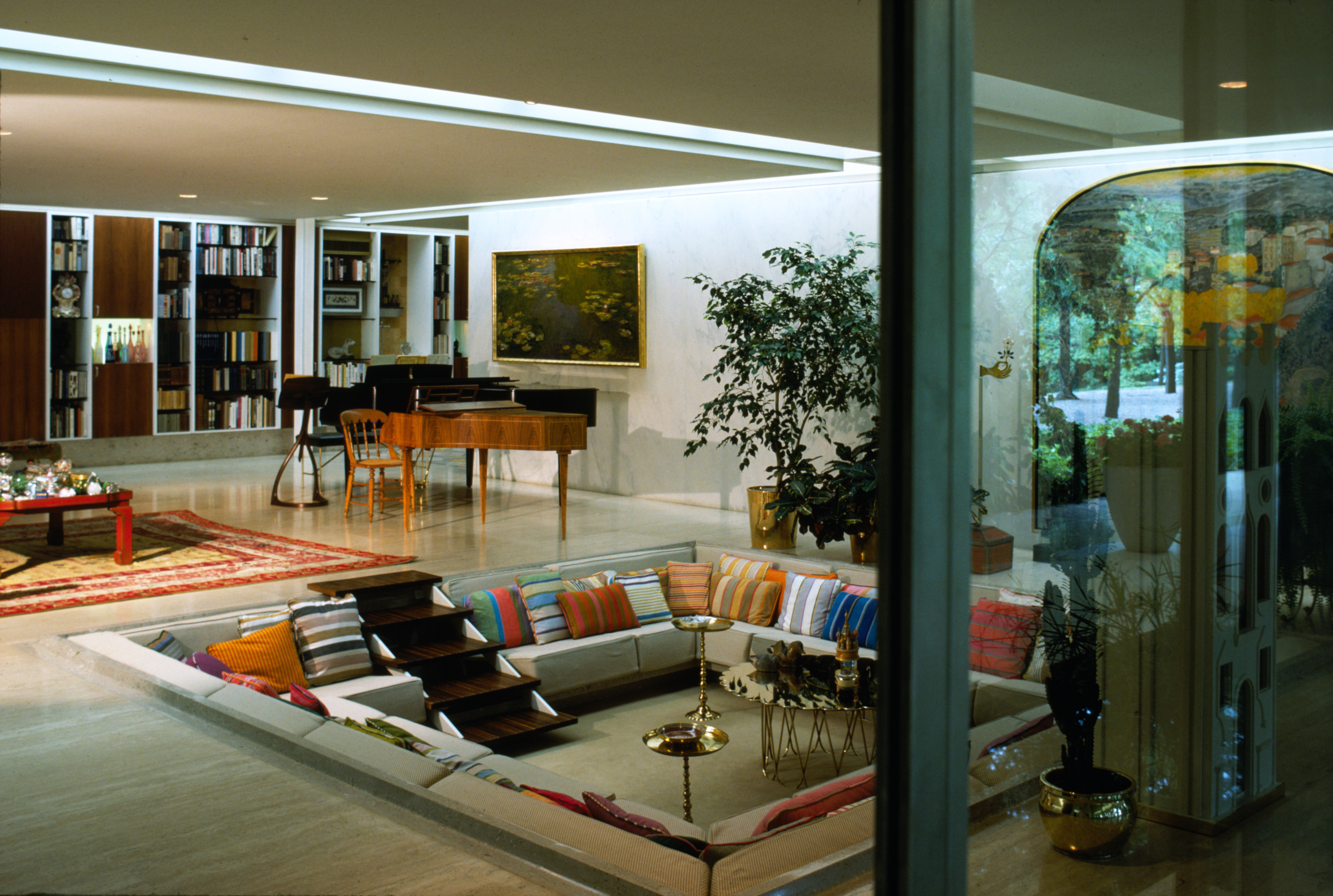
The central conversation pit in the Miller House

The conversation pit, also known as the lounge pit or conversation center, is a square measuring 15 feet (4.6 m) long on each side, with seating and marble coping on all four sides. Attributed to Girard, who had used a similar design detail in his own house, it occupies the western portion of the house, between the parents' and children's zones. The pit is accessed by five steps and is placed approximately 20 feet (6.1 m) from the nearest windows. The pit removed the need for standalone furniture, which could become disorganized and which Saarinen regarded as a distraction. It also created what the critic Blair Kamin described as a "room within a room".

===== Outlying zones =====
The guest–servant zone at the southeast corner contains a guest room, which adjoins the south terrace and has a single bedroom and bathroom. There is also a servant's bedroom and a carport abutting it. The carport, which has a terrazzo floor, is accessed by a door just off the main entrance foyer. To the northeast is the service zone, which includes a kitchen. There are two separate countertops for servants and the family, each made of a different material. There are also a dining island; a built-in dishwasher and oven; and three walk-in closets that contain a pantry, refrigerator, and tableware storage. The kitchen has a blue, white, and gray color palette, with mosaic tiles above the counters. A passageway leads directly from the countertops, dishwasher, and oven to the dining space. Movable draperies separate the dining space from the living room, while sliding glass doors lead from the dining room to the garden.

The parents' zone in the northwest contains a master bedroom, an adjoining study room, and dressing rooms. The master bedroom has gray-white walls and a fireplace, and the dressing rooms contain mirrored walls; in addition, there is a closet for suitcases. The arrangement of the children's zone, in the southwest, was inspired by Saarinen's perception of children's rooms in Finland, where he had been born. The Miller children slept in small, utilitarian bedrooms surrounding a large playroom. Each child had their own room, which was color-coded. Small, movable casement windows provide air to each child's bedroom. Two of the rooms are separated by a removable wall. A hall leads from the playroom to a small sitting area, which leads directly outside, and there is also a utility room in the children's zone.

==== Furnishings ====
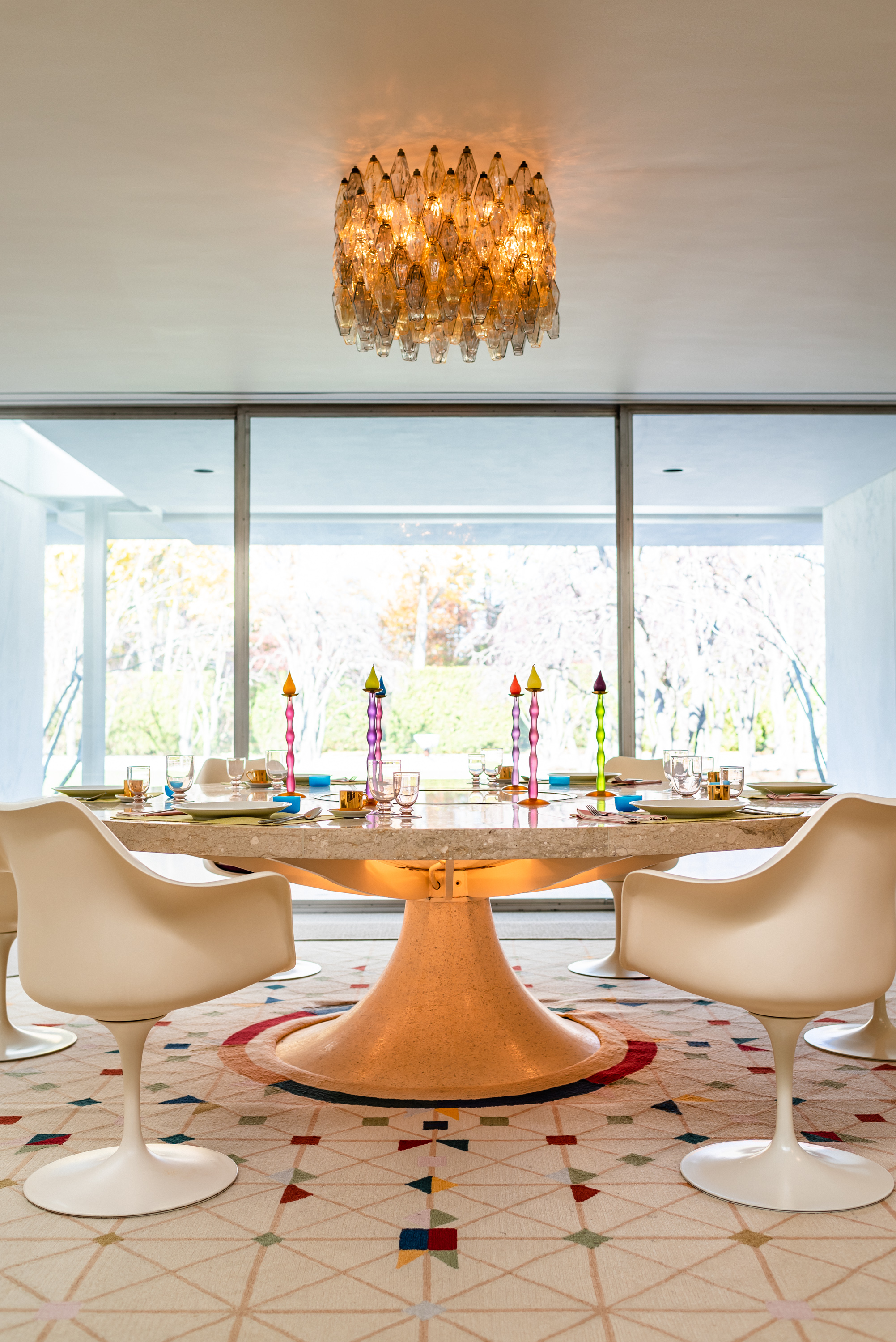
Dining table and chairs, with chandelier above

House and Garden magazine wrote that "in the ordinary sense, the house was not decorated at all", because the actual structure lacked contrasting color schemes or materials. Instead, Girard created movable fabrics, textiles, furniture, and ornaments, which were themselves intended as integral parts of the design. The decorations were produced in either two or four color schemes, which were swapped out according to the season. Saarinen and other designers such as George Nelson, Charles Eames, Ray Eames, and Hans Wegner designed other furniture. Girard's design called for plants throughout the house as well.

The dining space has an 8-foot-wide (2.4 m) marble table that could be used for small family meals. The dining table, a custom version of Saarinen's Pedestal Collection tables, had a fountain at the center. Larger events were intended to be held in the living room, with movable chairs and tables arranged around the fireplace. In the living room is a 50-foot-long (15 m) storage wall, designed by Girard, that includes cabinets, bookshelves, and niches. The storage wall is divided vertically into compartments of varying width, and the rear wall of each compartment is upholstered in a different material, corresponding to the objects displayed there. When the Millers lived there, the storage wall held objects including folk art from Mexico, Asia, and Eastern Europe, in addition to books and musical instruments. A grand piano, designed by Saarinen's associate Balthazar Korab, was the only freestanding object in the living room other than the fireplace. The underside of the living room's piano, which was visible from the conversation pit, was painted scarlet.

The children's rooms have furniture such as a bed, desk, and dresser, and they have carpets and wooden walls to give them a cozy feeling. The playroom has another piano, as well as storage chests with plastic covers; the piano still has marks where the Miller children bit onto it. The parents' bedroom originally displayed additional objects, such as an antique Chinese coffee table and a Christian cross. Their dressing rooms have shelves, pull-out drawers, and hangers, and Wegner designed a valet chair for Irwin and a sewing table for Xenia. In addition, Xenia had at least a hundred crèches depicting nativity scenes. A reporter for The Republic wrote in 1968 that the Millers had a collection of glass paperweights and perfume bottles and that the living-room shelving constituted "a small museum in itself".

Girard designed many patterns for the house's carpets and curtains, and Jack Lenor Larsen contributed other textile designs. All of the curtains were made of a dark gray yarn, which Girard intended would blend in with the rest of the house. For the master bedroom, Girard designed a drapery called Cut-Out with juxtaposed shadows and colors, in addition to a gray carpet and blue-gray upholstery. A living-room carpet by Girard includes emblems relating to family interests. (Note: These emblems included: An elephant for the Republican Party, the political party to which the Irwins were registered; The letter "Y" for Irwin's alma mater, Yale University; The letter "C" for the family business, Cummins; The number "5" for the number of children in the family) Girard also designed a carpet for the dining area, which complemented the design of the dining table, and another carpet for the playroom, which was divided into individual squares that could be swapped out as necessary. Xenia's contract bridge club created seat covers for the dining chairs, with a different pattern for each member of the family. The house also had a colorful Oriental rug and Persian pillows.

==== Artwork ====
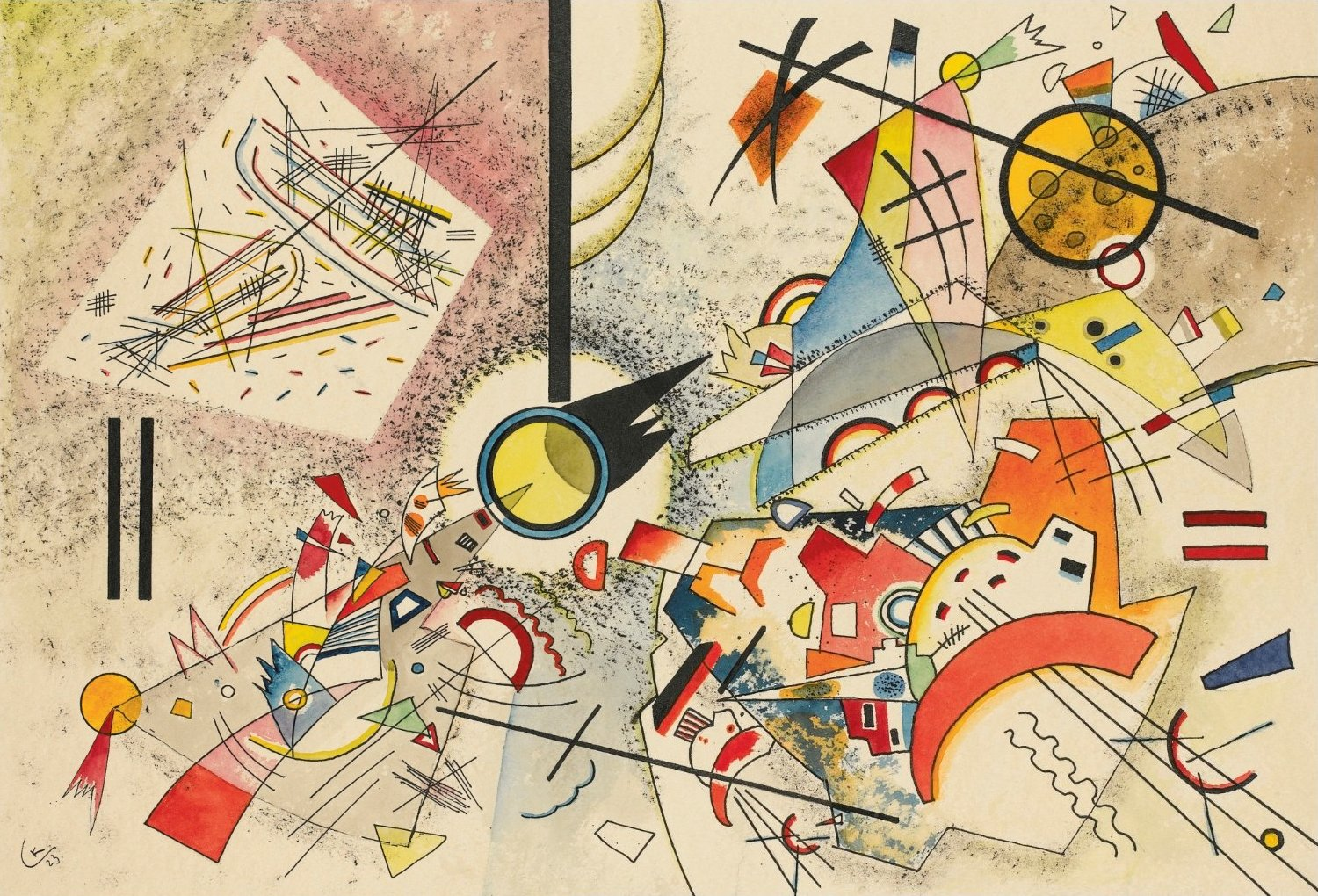
Wassily Kandinsky's Ohne Titel was among the first pieces of artwork the Millers bought for the house.

Soon after moving into the house, the Millers obtained various pieces of artwork from the 19th and 20th centuries. Wassily Kandinsky's Ohne Titel was among the first pieces of artwork the Millers bought for the house. Over the years, the Millers also acquired work by Pierre Bonnard, Marc Chagall, Henri Matisse, Claude Monet, Pablo Picasso, and Mark Rothko. These pieces were scattered around the house; for example, the Monet was placed behind the piano, and the Picasso stood in the dining room.

The collection was acquired haphazardly and was composed mainly of pieces they liked; in some cases, the Millers bought art on the spot while on vacation. Will said his parents "saw art as an essential element of leading a good life" but did not perceive their art as forming a collection. Irwin and Xenia both had to agree on any potential acquisitions, and they sometimes declined to acquire paintings, such as Jasper Johns's White Flag, after displaying them for a trial period. Despite the Miller family's lively lifestyle, their oldest child Margaret recalled that only one of the artworks was ever damaged. After the incident in question, in which a guest fell onto the Bonnard while trying to look at it, the Millers placed plants to discourage people from coming too close. Most of the original art was sold off in 2008.

== History ==
The house's original client was the American industrialist J. Irwin Miller, who was the longtime leader of his family's business, Cummins. While serving in the United States Navy, in 1943 Miller married Xenia Simons, who wrote letters to her husband describing her wish for "a very, very modern house", similar to what was eventually built. By the late 1940s, Miller led Cummins and the Irwin Union Trust Bank, and his family owned several buildings in Columbus. He had known the house's architect, Eero Saarinen, since 1939, when Saarinen's father Eliel had been hired to design the First Christian Church in the same city. Eero Saarinen was Miller's favorite architect, and Saarinen likewise regarded Miller as "the perfect client", ultimately designing four buildings for him. Miller was a major architectural patron in his hometown of Columbus, Indiana, during his lifetime, being one of the major financiers of modernist buildings in the city.

=== Development ===
Before the Miller House was built, the family's house in Columbus was located on 19th Street, near the Flatrock River. In 1950, Saarinen was hired to design a summer house in the Muskoka region of Ontario, Canada, which the Miller family had long used as a summer retreat. Known as Llanrwst, the cottage occupied a peninsula on a lake, with an organic design and interiors designed by Alexander Girard. After the Ontario house was completed, the Millers asked him to design a house in Columbus, which they planned to use throughout the year. At the time, Irwin Miller was developing the Irwin Union Bank Building in downtown Columbus, which Saarinen had also designed.

==== Site selection and design ====
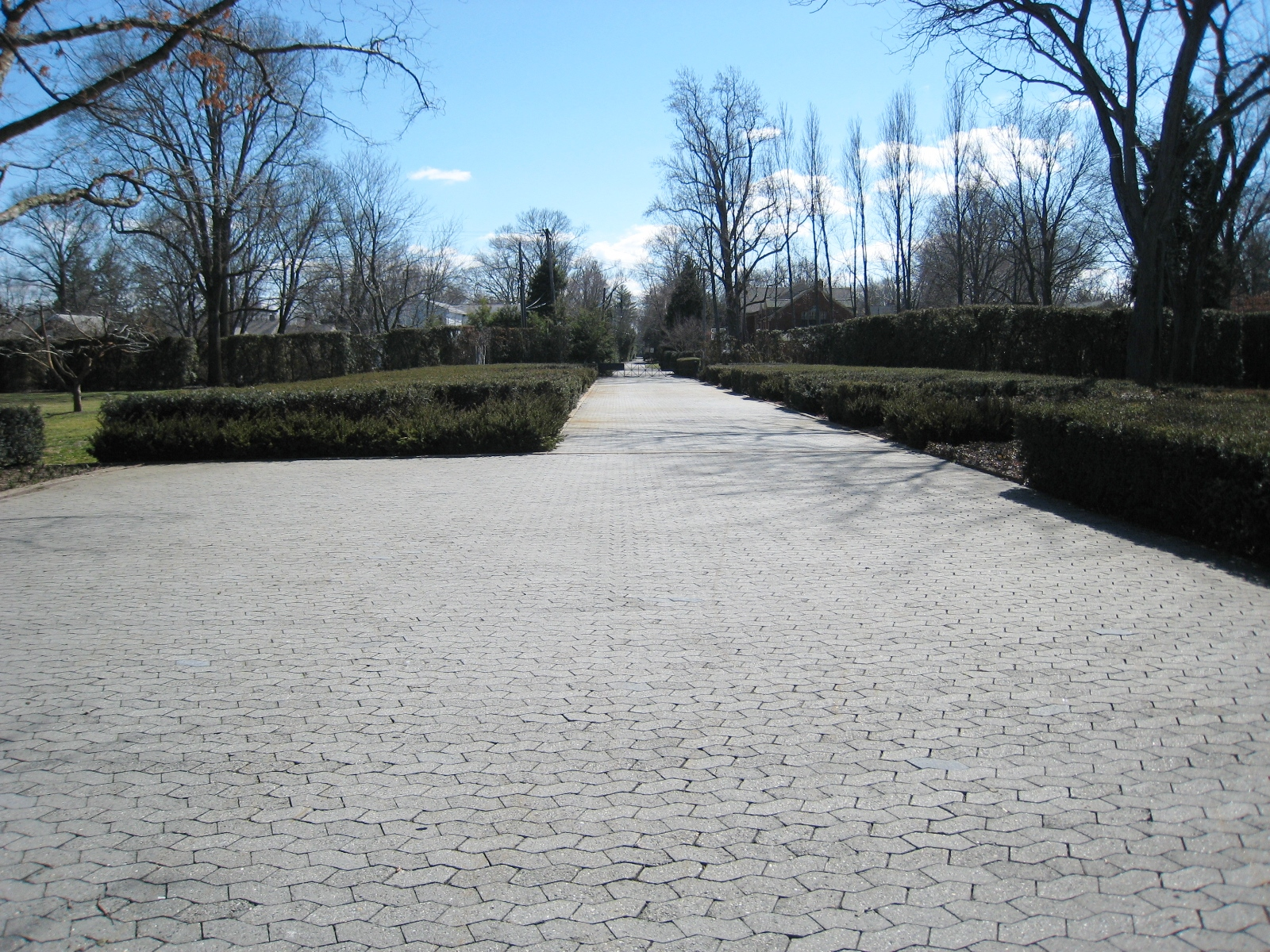
View from the house, looking down Highland Way to the south

In 1952, Irwin and Saarinen surveyed a site in suburban Columbus, and by May 1953, the Millers had invited Girard and Saarinen to discuss plans for a house there. The purchase, valued at $30,000, (Note: Equivalent to $284,000 in 2024) was delayed until September 1953 due to uncertainty regarding the site boundaries. Shortly afterward, Irwin wrote a letter indicating that the Millers would discuss the house's layout in mid-1953, with Saarinen and Girard visiting the site that September; according to Irwin, this would allow construction to begin in 1954. Saarinen and his team initially proposed constructing the house on the Flatrock River, which Xenia immediately rejected, facetiously saying that her children would have to row to school. According to the Millers' youngest child Will, the original landscape architect proposed adding a berm between the house and Washington Street. Kiley replaced that architect afterward, though sources disagree on whether it was Saarinen's or the Millers' idea to hire him. The Millers decided to construct their house on an elevated portion of the plot set back from the street, providing privacy while reducing the risk of flooding.

Different accounts give conflicting details on the house's design process, but Saarinen reportedly drew up a dozen versions of the house's design. The Miller house was to be the family's full-time residence, unlike similar modernist works like the Farnsworth House or the Philip Johnson Glass House, both of which were weekend residences. As such, Saarinen could not use full glass walls as the Farnsworth or Glass houses did. The design was also influenced by the Millers' desire to entertain important figures at the house, as the city did not have any suitable restaurants or lodging at the time. Xenia was heavily involved in the project; many of her requests for the house were included in the final design. The first drawings called for a house on stilts, but Xenia told Saarinen to redo the design because of her concerns about mosquito infestations. Other rejected designs included a curving massing, a house raised on a series of berms, and a house partially embedded into the hillside. Roche recalled that the Millers did not want a showy design but that they did want features appropriate for family events or gatherings, such as a conversation pit.

During 1953, the design team drew up plans for the landscape. By that December, the design team had decided to construct the house on a grid of 9-by-12.75-foot (2.74 m × 3.89 m) modules, although other details, such as the house's height, remained to be worked out. Saarinen presented the Millers with a revised design in March 1954. The design allowed the Millers to remove walls as their children grew and moved out. In response to Xenia's remark that she did not want to live in the same house forever, Saarinen told her, "We've built you a neutral house that can be changed." The Millers were pleased at Saarinen's drawings but had reservations about the cost and design details. Irwin wrote to Girard in July 1954, requesting that the design teams hasten the completion of the architectural drawings. Girard built a mockup of a conversation pit that was to be included in the design, displaying it in a New York storefront and asking passersby to sit on it.

==== Construction ====
Several Indiana contractors had submitted bids for the house's construction by early 1955; the First Christian Church's contractor, Charles R. Wermuth & Son, refused to submit a bid. After consultation with Saarinen's business manager Joseph Lacy, most of these firms were disqualified. The Taylor Brothers Construction Company received the contract on April 18, 1955, agreeing to build the house for $352,800, (Note: Equivalent to $3,215,000 in 2024) and hired many craftsmen from across the Midwestern U.S. to assist with the project. Despite Irwin's request that the house be built relatively quickly, construction was delayed by several factors. These included material shortages, the Millers' requirement for high-quality craftsmanship and material, and the high number of projects Saarinen's firm Saarinen Associates was involved with at the time. George Newlin of Irwin Management, the house's project management firm, requested a construction timetable from Thomas Dorste, a local architect involved in the project, in July 1955. That September, Irwin wrote to Girard that he did not think construction could proceed further until steel was delivered.

The house's landscape design was finished by mid-1955, though the landscape plans underwent revisions for more than two years afterward. By July 1956, Irwin wanted weekly construction updates on his house, and he enclosed doodles showing "What I Think is Happening" and "What I Want to Be Happening". Though Saarinen Associates wrote to Irwin asking for his patience, the house was not complete by July 31, 1956, the date mentioned in the original construction contract. Newlin wrote Irwin in late 1956 that the contractors had low morale because of delays regarding specifications, combined with Irwin's unrelenting demands. Although the house's final cost was not disclosed (and was kept secret), the Millers liked the house's quality.

=== Miller ownership ===
The Miller family began moving into the house on March 15, 1957, a process which took three weeks. The house was much larger than the Millers' previous residence, providing ample space for their five children, (Note: From oldest to youngest, Margaret, Catherine, Elizabeth, Hugh, and William) who ranged from 11 months to 13 years old. The Miller parents lived there for the rest of their lives, while their three daughters and two sons gradually moved away.

==== Lifestyle ====
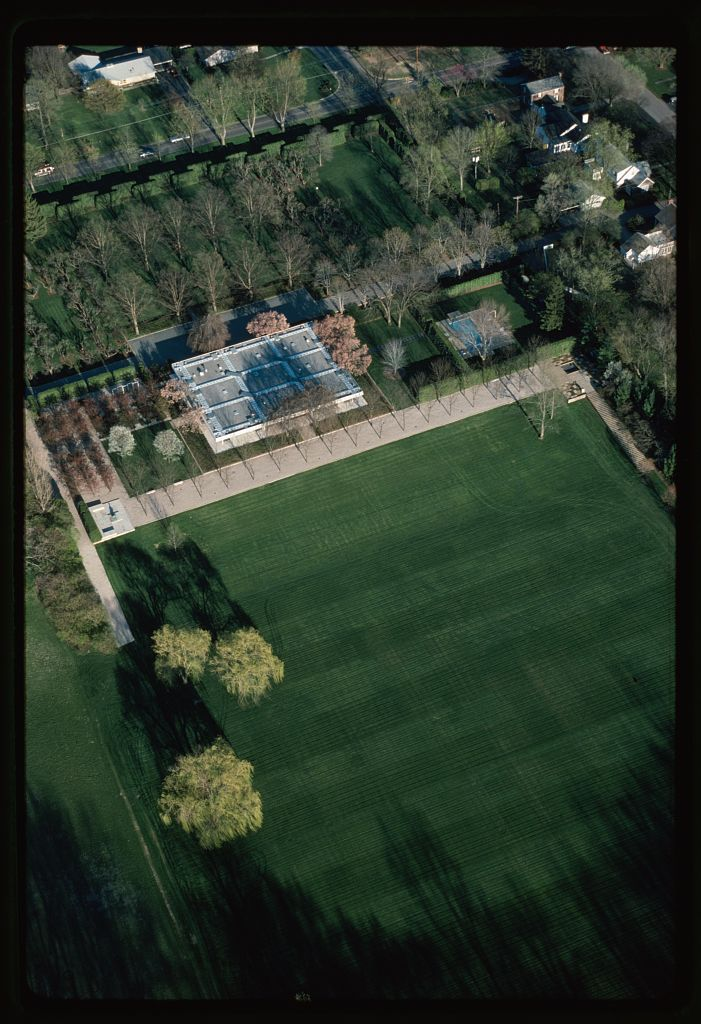
Aerial view of the grounds, seen from the northwest

When the Millers moved into the house, Xenia employed a personal assistant, and the family also hired a handyman–delivery driver, a chef, and a gardening team that typically included three people. Jack Schmeckebier, the house's gardener of 19 years, and two other assistants typically planted over 5,000 specimens annually. The house's design was ideal for the active lifestyles of the Miller children, who hosted sleepovers in the conversation pit and roller-skated and played touch football outside. The family typically ate meals in the kitchen, reserving the dining room for large gatherings. Irwin frequently played his violin in the house, and the children practiced on the piano. During Christmas, Xenia displayed her crèches throughout the house. Will later recalled, "This house, it was 24/7—winter, summer, spring. It's a real home that people lived in and spent their lives in."

Despite Irwin Miller's significant role in bringing modern architecture to Columbus, he and his family sought privacy in their own house, which was hidden behind hedges and was not mentioned in guidebooks. As such, the house was not open to the public. In a 1957 letter to Girard, Irwin offered to host a single media event for the house only if its location, cost, and owners' identities were kept secret. Though he personally preferred that there be no images, he acknowledged that Saarinen and Girard wanted publicity for their design. Publications initially did not divulge details about the house, but after House & Garden magazine published pictures of it in 1959, The Republic wrote that "local readers recognized immediately the lovely home of J. Irwin Miller, 2760 Highland Way". The children gradually moved away in the 1960s, since they all attended boarding school during their high school years.

The design was intended to accommodate social gatherings, which frequently took place there. The open-plan living spaces between each zone were ideal for business visits. Conversely, the Millers could not pass between private zones without passing through the living room or going outside, and Will joked about how he "could not sneak to the kitchen without being noticed by his mother". The house periodically hosted the meetings of Xenia's contract bridge club, the Old Maids. Saarinen, Roche, and Girard all visited the house multiple times, as did other designers and artists including Balthazar Korab, Harry Weese, Dale Chihuly, and Jean Tinguely. Lady Bird Johnson, the First Lady of the United States, stayed at the house overnight in 1967. Other guests included David Rockefeller and his wife Peggy; New York City mayor John Lindsay; and Ford Foundation officials. The Miller House also hosted other special events, such as their daughter Elizabeth's wedding reception, a party for the Irwin Management Company, and a 1994 architectural reception after the architect Christian de Portzamparc was awarded the Pritzker Architecture Prize.

==== Modifications ====
Saarinen, Girard, and Kiley or their firms were hired to oversee many subsequent modifications to the house. Shortly after the house was completed, the Millers replaced the original chairs from Charles and Ray Eames with tulip chairs from Saarinen. They also acquired numerous pieces of artwork, often visiting art museums and galleries with Margaret, their oldest child. Saarinen died in 1961, not long after the house was completed, and Roche took over responsibility for modifications. During the mid-1960s, Saarinen's firm (by then renamed Roche-Dinkeloo) drew up plans to illuminate and display the artwork, and they added ultraviolet filters and plexiglass to the house's laylights. The Miller family also obtained a neighboring site to the south in 1966 to provide expanded accommodations for the house's staff.

The Millers removed an interior wall in the guest–servant zone in 1978, enlarging the guest room. In 1984, one of the house's bedrooms caught fire, causing $2,000 in damage; (Note: Equivalent to $5,000 in 2024) according to Xenia, workers had recently been repairing the roof and had forgotten to close the fireplace grille. Elderly guests could not leave the conversation pit easily, and the Millers themselves began having difficulty leaving the pit as they aged. As such, in 1994, Roche added a handrail inside the pit. Roche also added a walk-in shower to the daughters' bathroom after the parents began to experience difficulties with mobility; these modifications took place in the early 2000s, along with upgrades to the security system, HVAC system, and roof between 1999 and 2002.

Changes to the landscape over the years included replacing hedges, trees, and other dying or damaged plants. In 1960, the Columbus government gave Miller permission to install an outdoor swimming pool outside the house, which was completed in 1963. Kiley proposed planting a small garden in the forest near the river, though the family rejected the plans. On at least two occasions, the western allée was entirely replanted. The first time was within two decades of the house's completion, as the soil was so densely compacted that none of the root balls planted there had actually grown into trees. The western allée was replanted again in 1999 after some of the redbuds died. Other landscape modifications included the addition of a greenhouse–office and the removal of a tennis court. The hedges near the adult garden were removed, to Kiley's dismay. Overall, the changes mostly conformed to Kiley's master plan.

==== Millers' deaths ====
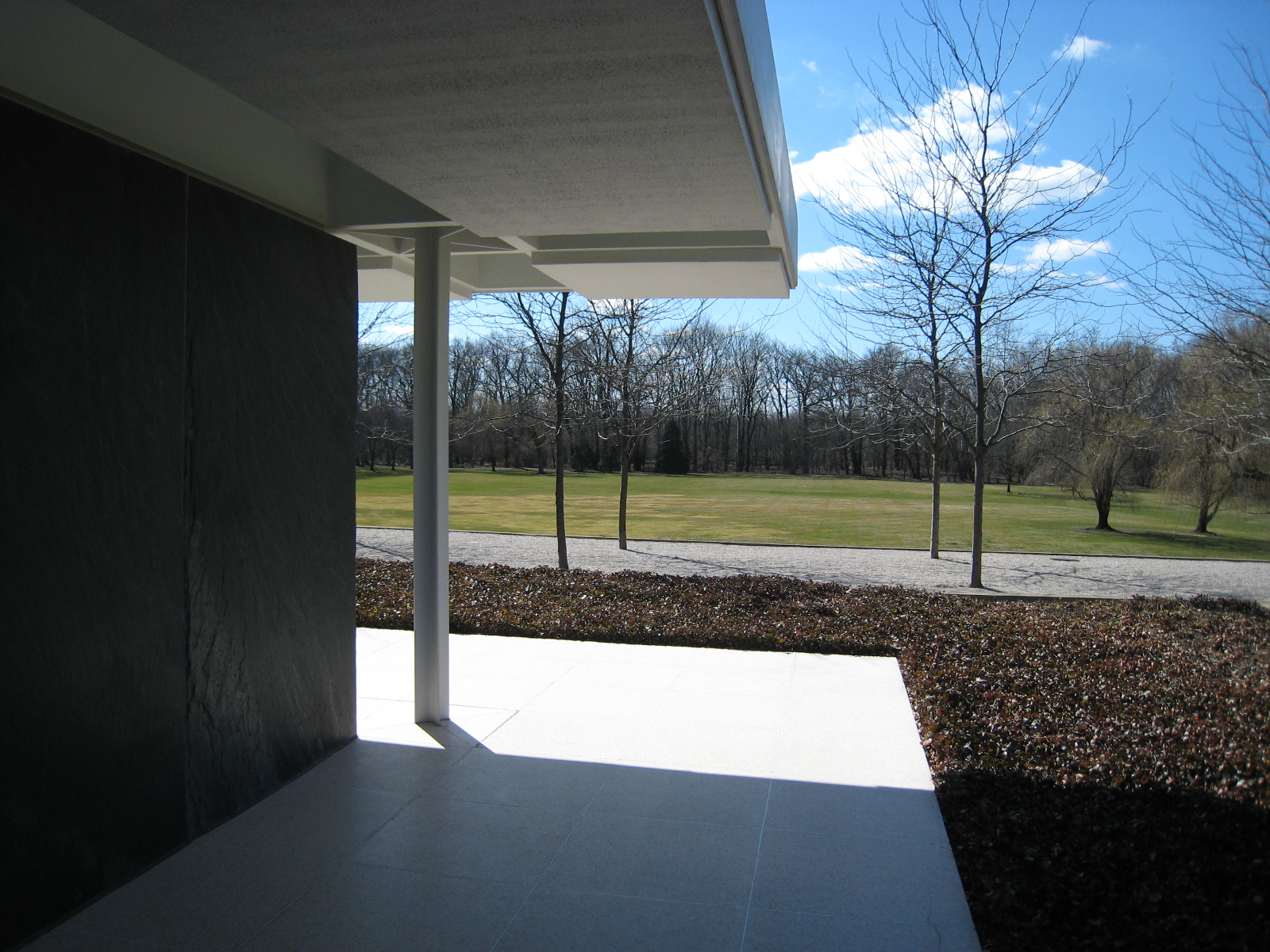
View from the northwest corner, looking toward the western allée

Irwin died in the house in 2004 at the age of 95, though the family had been considering the house's future even before then. Afterward, all of the house's art was removed. The Indianapolis Museum of Art (IMA) had expressed interest in the house as early as 2007, just before Xenia's death. The IMA's proposal called for limiting public access to the house and to make minimal changes to the surrounding neighborhood; early plans called for a limited number of guided tours every day, with shuttle vans to and from Columbus's visitor center. The preservation organizations Indiana Landmarks and the National Trust for Historic Preservation also wanted to take over the house. In May 2007, the Millers invited several preservationists and other parties to a mini-charette to discuss the house's future use. Subsequently, the IMA and the Miller family hosted several meetings about the possibility of converting the house to a historic house museum.

Xenia, the last resident of the home, ultimately died there in February 2008. By then, Xenia had been sick for several years. That June, some of the artwork was sold for $135 million; one of the pieces, Claude Monet's Le Bassin Aux Nymphéas, was sold for $80.4 million. The same month, the Miller family gave the IMA permission to conduct a private study of the house. The Millers' oldest son Hugh subsequently sued his brother Will over $2.7 million in expenditures that the latter had made, some of which had gone toward the upkeep of the Miller House. The Bartholomew County Superior Court and the Indiana Court of Appeals both ruled in Will's favor, finding that the expenditures had been justified.

=== Indianapolis Museum of Art ownership ===
==== Conversion to museum ====
In November 2008, the Miller family agreed to donate the house to the IMA, citing the museum's stewardship of another historic property, the Lilly House. The Millers also pledged $5 million toward an endowment for the house, provided that the IMA raise another $3 million; the museum sought to raise another $2 million for a full renovation of the house. Early plans called for an endowment of $15 million, but the Great Recession prevented the museum from raising all of the necessary funds. The Cummins Foundation also provided a grant to help finance tours and capital upgrades to the house. In addition, the Miller children donated more than 5,000 of the family's belongings to the IMA, and the museum bought another 579 objects that were auctioned off. The firm of Michael Van Valkenburgh redesigned the landscape again between 2008 and 2009.

The IMA formally became the house's owner in May 2009, and it presented plans for the house to the Columbus Board of Zoning Appeals shortly afterward. Following a brief delay, in late 2009, the Columbus Board of Zoning Appeals agreed to rezone the house for museum use, with several stipulations. For example, the IMA was forbidden to add parking (requiring visitors to be shuttled to the house), and museum officials also agreed to add security gates and limit large events. Before opening the Miller House to the public, the IMA removed the railing from the conversation pit, restoring the pit to its original appearance. The original fabrics were restored, but the IMA did not commission reproductions of the Millers' artwork, since it wanted to emphasize the architecture. The work also included repairing outdoor terraces, adding a cooler, converting the guest bedroom into an office, removing mold from the greenhouse on the grounds, and adding UV filters. In November 2010, the IMA announced that it would open the house in May 2011 and that tickets would be sold a month in advance.

==== Usage ====
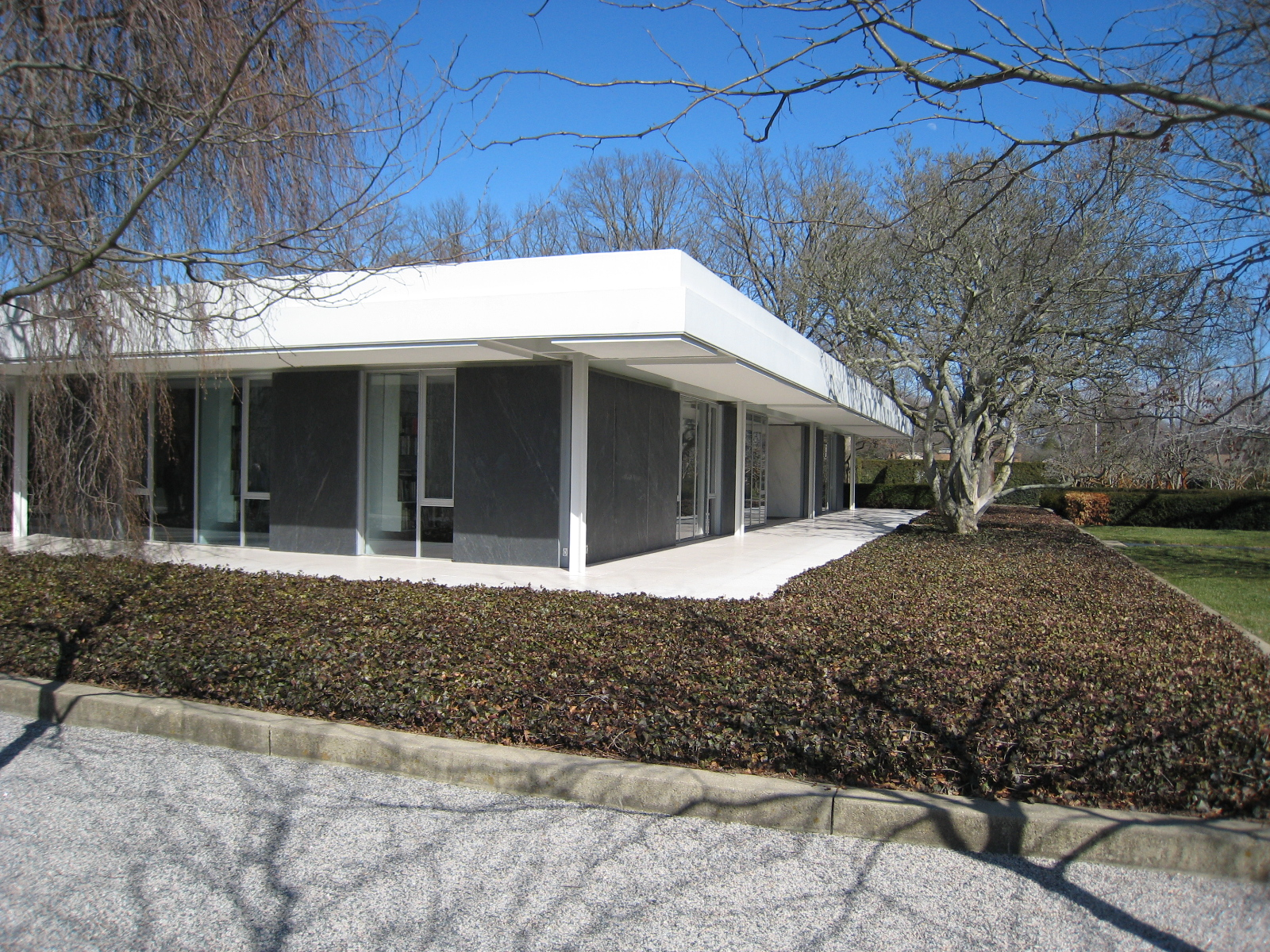
View of the southwest corner

The Miller House gained large amounts of publicity in the media even before the renovation was completed. Though most people who expressed interest in the house were from Indiana or neighboring states, people from as far away as Canada and Australia purchased tickets to see it. The Miller House opened to the public on May 12, 2011, and had 2,600 visitors in its first three months; observers likened the high visitation to the opening of a new Disney ride. The house's opening helped increase business in downtown Columbus and attracted repeat visitors to the city. During the winter, the IMA initially planned to host tours once a week, but high demand prompted the museum to add extra tours, which were often fully booked.

The IMA continued to renovate the house after opening it to the public. The IMA digitized the house's collection of artifacts in 2012, following a $190,000 grant from the National Endowment for the Humanities. The same year, the gardens were re-landscaped, and the house underwent interior modifications, including new furniture and furnishings. The museum also added new storage areas and plantings, as well as humidifiers and LED lights, and it typically closed the house for maintenance during January and February. The IMA began providing virtual reality tours of the house at its main location, Newfields, in 2018. The Getty Foundation distributed a preservation grant to the Miller House in 2019 as part of the foundation's Keeping It Modern program. The $170,000 grant was used to hire preservation consultants; at the time, the house needed repairs due to leaks and other damage.

During 2020, the house was closed for five months due to the COVID-19 pandemic; when it reopened, tours operated with a limited capacity. The house's swimming pool was renovated during that time. Forty-two trees in the northern orchard and thirty-four in the southern orchard were replanted in 2021 following donations from several families. In addition, 131 trees were transferred to the Miller House from the Bartholomew County Courthouse, where they had been displayed as part of the Exhibit Columbus exhibition series in 2019; these were replanted around the house's pool. The restoration of the swimming pool and orchard landscapes was completed in 2022. Newfields also devised a conservation plan for the house and grounds.

== Management and operation ==
The Miller House is open to the public, with tours provided by the IMA. The Columbus Area Visitors Center sells tickets for tours to the house, while the IMA maintains the property. The visitor center is located at 506 Fifth Street in downtown Columbus. Because of restrictions on parking near the Miller House, visitors must park near the visitor center, where a shuttle van takes them to the house.

When the house opened, it initially hosted tours six days a week, though this was reduced during the wintertime. The tours could accommodate up to 13 people and lasted 90 minutes each. As of 2025, the Miller House hosts tours twice a day, five days a week. The tours typically last an hour and include a short film at the visitor center. Children younger than 10 years old cannot attend the tours. In addition to general tours of the house, there are several specialized tours, tickets for which are sold for an additional fee. Though photography is not permitted on general tours, it is allowed on specialized photography tours. In 2012, the house museum's first full year of operation, the tours attracted 6,506 visitors, increasing to 12,000 visitors by 2021.

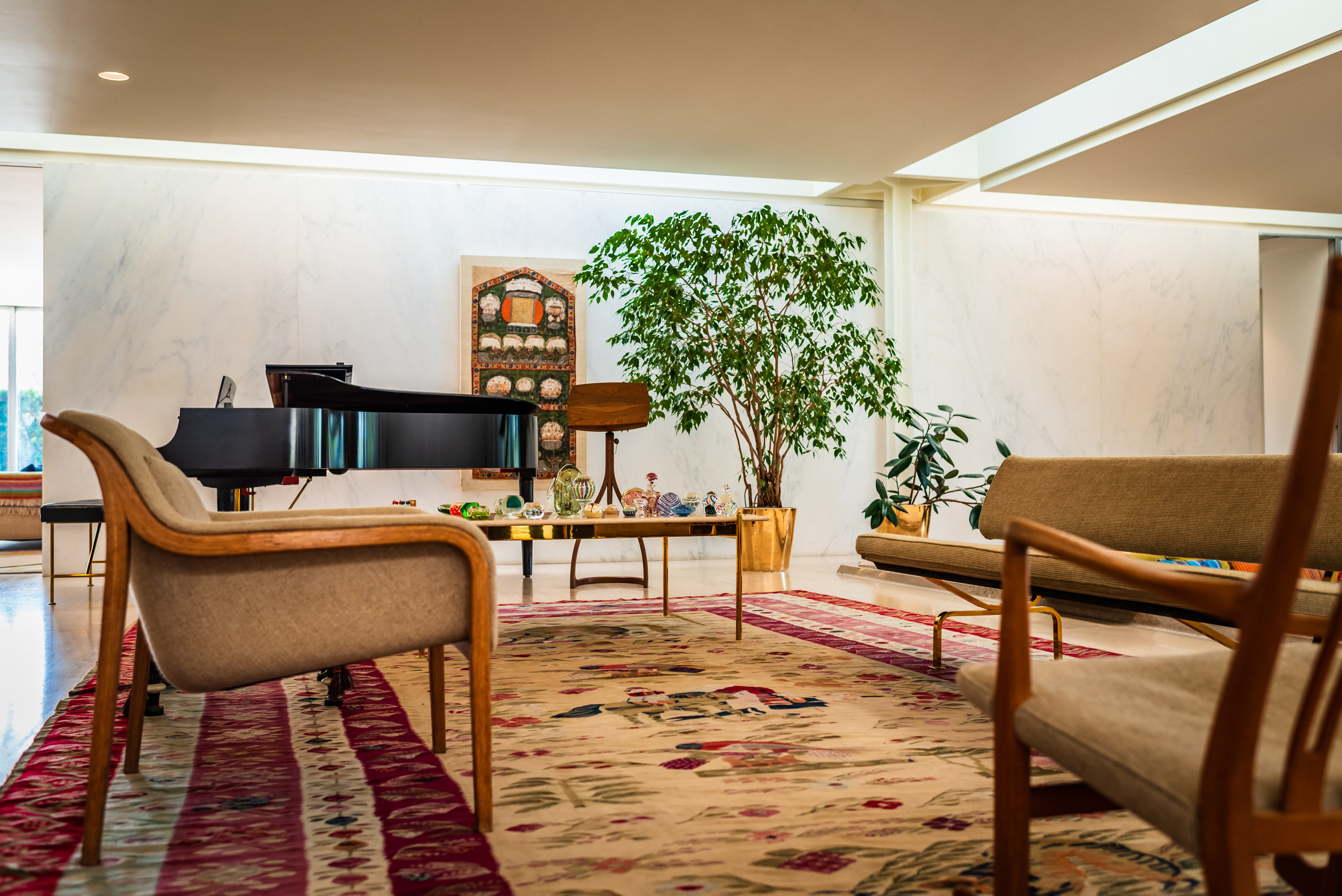
Some of the original furnishings are placed on display. Pictured is the living room with chairs, tables, and piano.

All of the rooms are open for viewing on the tour, except for the servant bedroom, which is used as a security office. The house museum displays some Asian, Eastern European, and Mexican art, but few of the Millers' original artworks remain. Some of the original furnishings are placed on display, while others have been sold or remain in private ownership. In addition, starting in 2015, some of Xenia's crèches were displayed during the Christmas and holiday season. The IMA's archives include 65 boxes of materials relating to the house.

== Impact ==
=== Reception ===
The Miller House has been described as a "touchstone of midcentury design" and one of the United States' best midcentury modern residences. A writer for Curbed grouped the Miller House with Frank Lloyd Wright's Fallingwater, Ludwig Mies van der Rohe's Farnsworth House, and Philip Johnson's Glass House as American modernist icons, "glorified in equal part by architecture geeks and tourists". Elizabeth Kramer, writing for the Courier-Journal, said that the Farnsworth, Johnson, and Miller houses were "some of the nation's most important modernist residences" along with the Eames House. Another writer for the St. Louis Post-Dispatch said in 2010 that the house and garden "reflects the work of three masters of modernism [Saarinen, Kiley, and Girard] collaborating at the height of their careers".

==== House commentary ====
In 1958, just after the house was finished, the Architectural Forum said that the design had managed to combine "two apparently opposite concepts of residential planning", specifically the central core and the zones surrounding it. The Architectural Forum article compared the house with Palladian villas, and specifically the Villa La Rotonda, despite Saarinen's objections. The following year, House & Garden magazine highlighted it as the magazine's third "Hallmark House" of 1959, praising the house's "daring new uses of space, light and fine materials". The Republic wrote in 1968 that the house "radiated not only gracious, but family living".

In a book edited by architecture writers Eeva-Liisa Pelkonen and Donald Albrecht, the historian Christopher Monkhouse wrote in 2006, "Despite [the Miller family's] desire for a low-key, private home, the Miller House ends up being an essay in modernist inconspicuous consumption." The Millers' son Will wrote in the same book that the house's design succeeded because of the combination of art and landscape, while another observer praised the Miller House as an example of "understated brilliance and austere luxury". Blair Kamin wrote that the house "breaks out of the straitjacket of steel-and-glass modernism by adopting a more flexible approach", much like Columbus's other buildings did, and the St. Louis Post-Dispatch described the house as a modern adaptation of Palladian villas.

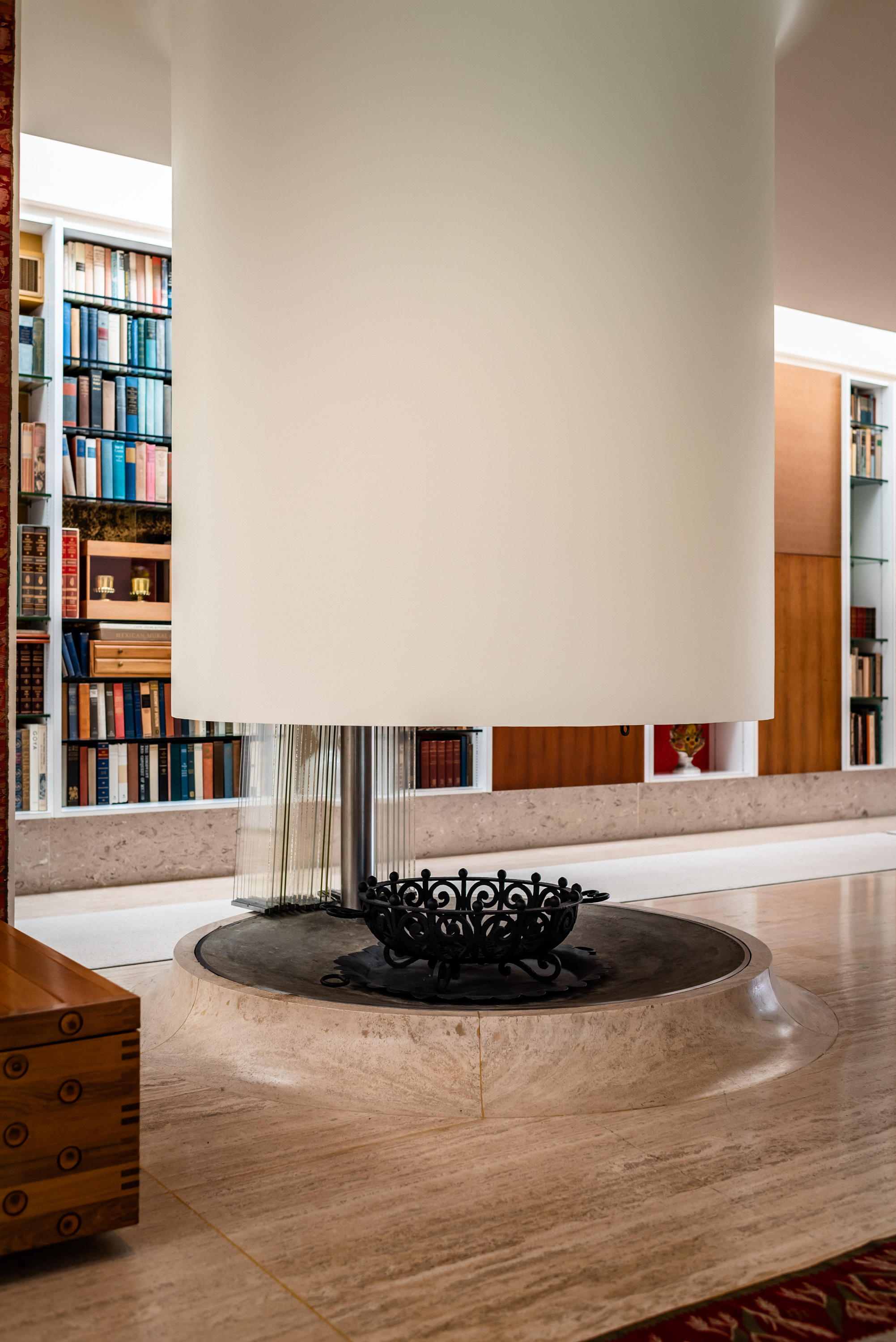
The fireplace

When the house museum opened, Travel + Leisure wrote that the house and gardens were "revolutionary" for their time and "still feel fresh, contemporary" even a half-century after their completion, while The Wall Street Journal said the house exemplified a type of modern architecture "that is warm, livable and majestic as it flows together with the landscape". A Boston Globe critic said the Miller House had "been returned to its intentioned pristine light-filled self", bereft of the Millers' eclectic artwork collection, while a writer for The Globe and Mail said the house's interior was the highlight of its design. A reporter for Crain's Chicago wrote that Kiley's landscape design and Girard's interior design were what kept the house from being "little more than a box".

==== Garden commentary ====
Kiley's design for the house's gardens was also acclaimed. Several sources regarded the Miller Garden as an early example of a modern-style garden and one of the United States' best gardens. A writer for The Guardian regarded the Miller Garden as Kiley's first "mature project", while The Washington Post described it as the "culmination" of Kiley's work, with its formality reflecting a change from his free-flowing designs.

In a 1996 book, the landscape architect Peter Walker wrote that "in no other work has Kiley been able to attempt and achieve so much", saying that the off-center placement of the allées were part of the "ingenuity" of Kiley's landscape design. After Kiley's 2004 death, the landscape-architecture professor Gary Hildebrand called the Miller Garden "beautifully built and organized, with an almost museum-like quality". Kramer described the gardens as bringing "a sense of calm and order, but highlight[ing] the property's expanse", while the writer Julian Raxworthy said the garden was a major reason for why the house was "very much a Gesamtkunstwerk, a total work of art".

=== Media ===
The house has been depicted in multiple media works, despite Irwin Miller's aversion to media coverage of the house. In early 1958, Irwin arranged for the photographer Ezra Stoller to take images of the house; Stoller requested that the family relocate for the duration of the photoshoot, which lasted several days. Stoller's images appeared in the Architectural Forum article about the Miller House. House and Garden was the only other publication that was allowed to take pictures of the house in its early years. Later publications with images of the Miller House included a 1962 edition of the French architectural magazine L'ŒIL, as well as an issue of Life magazine in 1967. Life had also taken photographs of the house in 1961, but they were apparently never published. In 1975, Alan Ward took pictures of the house's garden on behalf of the landscape architect Peter Walker.

The house was featured in exhibitions such as a 2006 traveling exhibit of Saarinen's work, and Will gave lectures about the house in the 2000s. In addition, Bradley Brooks published a book on the house in 2011. The building was also featured in Columbus, a 2017 film set in the city; the house was depicted as the favorite building of one of the main characters.

=== Architectural influence ===
The design prompted Bahrain's royal family and a family in Minnesota to contact Saarinen about the possibility of designing them houses. Saarinen refused both commissions, as he had designed the Miller House as a favor to a friend. The Architectural Review of Britain described Saarinen's buildings for Miller as an "important legacy from Saarinen for the environment". The Millers and Roche also met each other while developing the house; after Saarinen's death in 1961, Roche designed numerous other buildings in Columbus, as well as a house in Florida, for the Millers. The house also inspired the design of a nearby residence constructed for the architect David Force. The high concentration of modern buildings in Columbus, including the Miller House, helped make it one of the American Institute of Architects' top U.S. cities for innovation and design, in large part because of Miller's architectural patronage.

The house popularized the concept of the conversation pit; even before his death in 1961, Saarinen had feared that the feature had become clichéd. Saarinen used a similar feature in New York's TWA Flight Center, and the pit was widely emulated for a brief time in the late 1960s. MinnPost wrote in 2008 that the conversation pit was one of several innovations in Saarinen's buildings, which "have become such integral parts of our design lives that we hardly attribute them to an individual". The Eames Aluminum Group chairs were originally produced specifically for the Miller House, and Saarinen also devised an early version of his tulip chair for the house. Korab cited his work at the house as a contributing factor in his decision to become an architectural photographer, while Kiley and Roche remained involved in Columbus's architectural commissions for years afterward.

In early 2000, the Miller House and five other modernist structures in Columbus were nominated for designation as National Historic Landmarks (NHLs), which would add them to the National Register of Historic Places (NRHP). The United States Department of the Interior designated four of these buildings, including the Miller House, as landmarks that May. This was the first time in U.S. history that several buildings were simultaneously designated as NHLs before turning 50 years old, the minimum age required for most buildings to be listed on the NRHP.. The Miller House was also the first residence to be designated as an NHL with its original owners still living there and its original landscape architect still alive. The designation allowed the building to qualify for federal preservation funds. The landmark nominations themselves received national media attention, in part because very few NRHP sites were designated as NHLs, let alone multiple sites in such a small area.

== See also ==
- List of works by Eero Saarinen
- List of museums in Indiana
- List of National Historic Landmarks in Indiana
- National Register of Historic Places listings in Bartholomew County, Indiana
- Oldfields – Historic estate in Indianapolis, Indiana
