= Patricia Schiller =

Patricia Schiller (October 27, 1913 - June 29, 2018) was an American lawyer, clinical psychologist and sex educator. She was a professor in the Department of Obstetrics and Gynecology at Howard University College of Medicine in Washington, DC for 30 years.

== Early life and education ==
Patricia Schiller was born Pearl Silverman in Brooklyn as the fourth of four children to Russian-Jewish immigrants. She attended Brooklyn Law School and received her JD in 1934. In the early 1940s she worked as a legal-aid attorney for the National Labor Relations Board.

== Career ==
Schiller followed an interest in marriage counselling and in 1955 offered courses for the Legal Aid Society. She helped create the first public school in the U.S. for pregnant girls.

In 1960, she received a master's degree in clinical psychology from American University in Washington, DC. She eventually convinced the Dean of Howard University College of Medicine in Washington, DC, to hire her at the Department of Obstetrics and Gynecology.

In 1967, she founded the American Association of Sexuality Educators, Counselors and Therapists (AASECT). She collaborated with William Masters and Virginia Johnson on guidelines and ethical standards for sexual counselors.

== Personal life ==
In 1943, she married lawyer Irving Schiller, then a first lieutenant in the Army, two years after they had met. They settled in Washington, and had two children, Louise and Jonathan. The couple had a home on Martha’s Vineyard where she socialised with influential women like Mrs. Robert McNamara, Mrs. W. Willard Wirtz, and Mrs. Arthur Goldberg. The couple moved to Florida permanently in 1990 and her husband died in 2007, while she outlived him another 11 years, becoming 104 years old. She died of hypertensive cardiovascular disease in Palm Beach, Florida.

Her son, Jonathan D. Schiller, is a lawyer and co-founder of prominent law firm Boies Schiller Flexner LLP.

== Publications ==
Schiller published three books, "Creative Approach to Sex Education and Counseling", 1973, which was translated into Spanish and Italian, "The Sex Profession: What Sex Therapy Can Do", 1981 and "Sex Questions Kids Ask: and How To Answer" in 2009.

== Awards ==
In 1970, she received the "Advanced Pacesetter Award" from the President’s National Advisory Board for founding Webster School, 1963 to 1967, the first U.S. school for pregnant girls which "educated and nurtured them through their high school diplomas". The World Association for Sexual Health (WAS) awarded Schiller the Gold Medal in 1990 for her contributions to the field of sexology.
