= Conversation pit =

Architectural feature

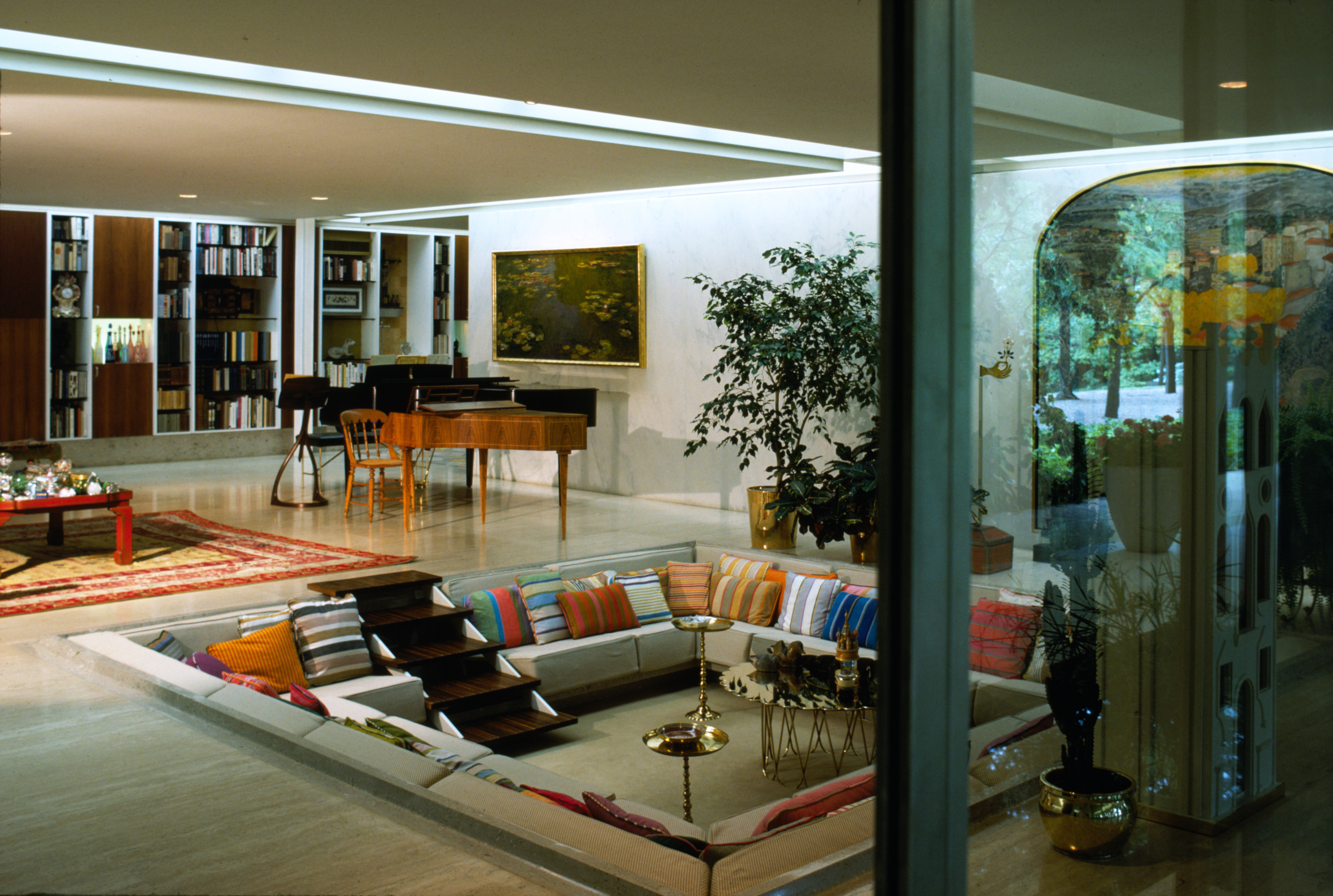
The influential early conversation pit in Eero Saarinen's Miller House

A conversation pit is an architectural feature that incorporates built-in seating into a depressed section of flooring within a larger room. This area often has a table in the center as well. The seats typically face each other in a centrally focused fashion, bringing the occupants closer together than free-standing tables and chairs normally would. In residential design this proximity facilitates comfortable human conversation, dinner parties, and tabletop games. Its disadvantages include accidental falls and uncomfortable interactions with those standing above in the main room.

== History ==
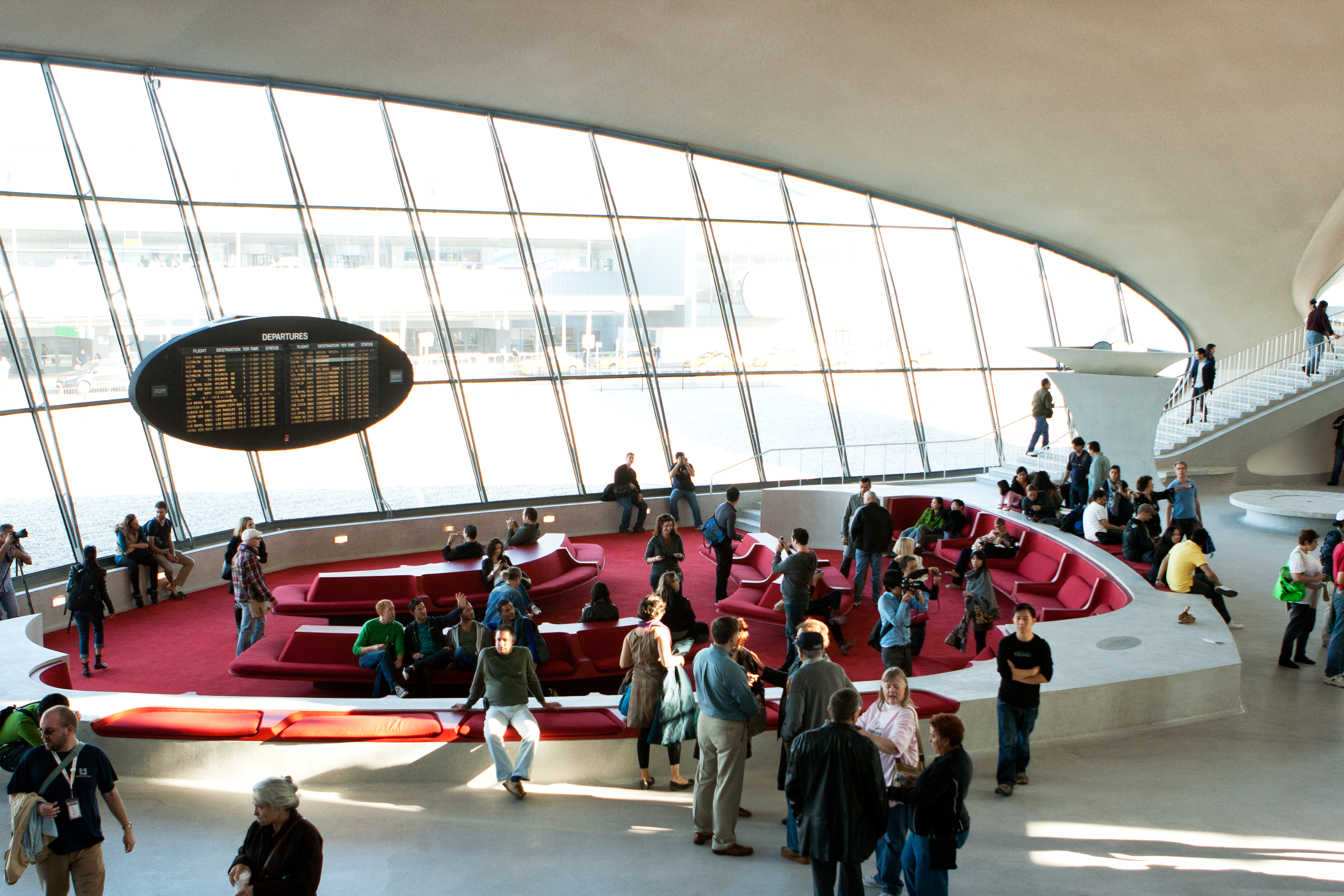
Saarinen's restored conversation pit at the TWA Flight Center

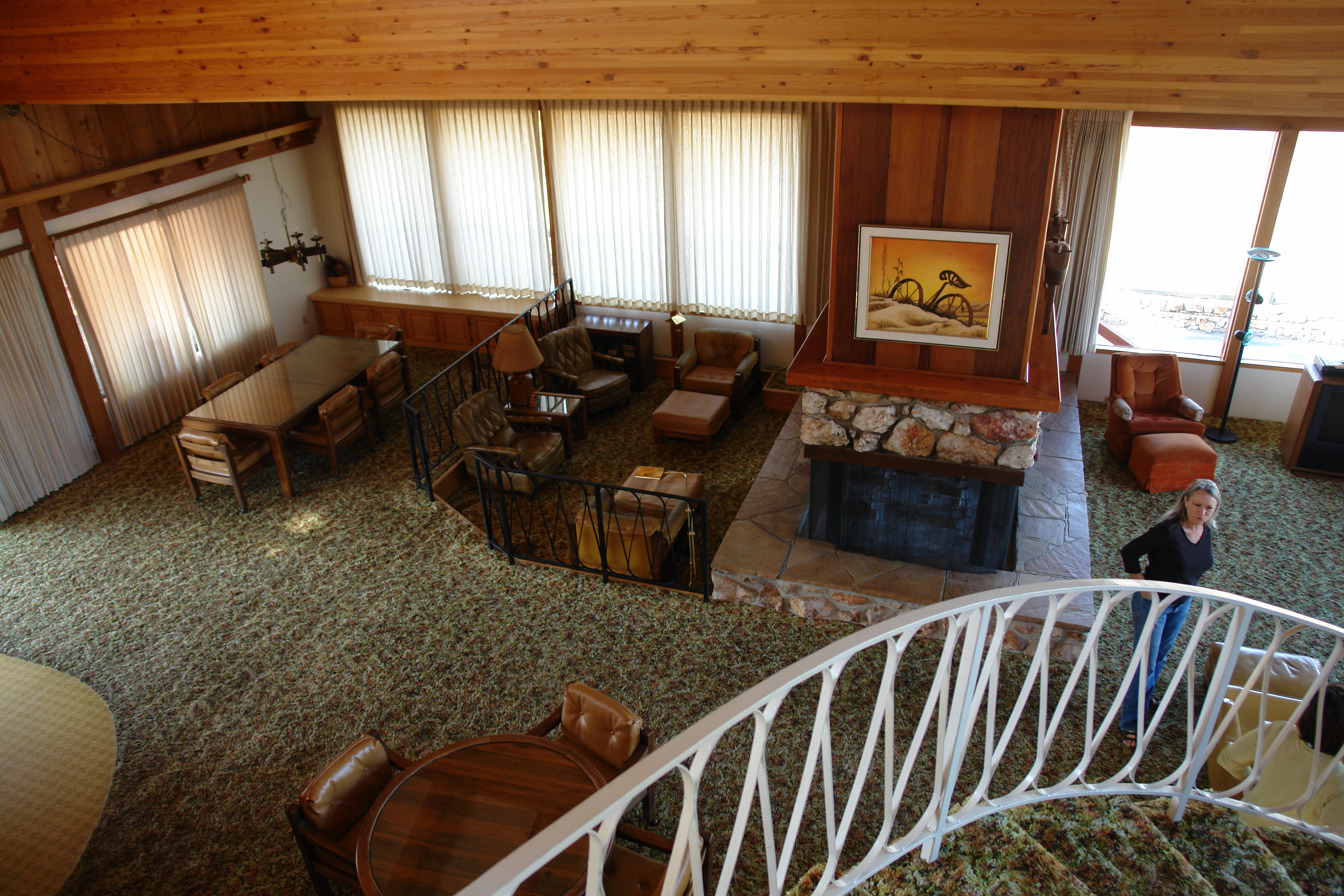
Looking down on the dining area and conversation pit on the BB ranch

The conversation pit was popular from the 1950s to the 1970s and was seen across Europe and North America. Modernist architects Eero Saarinen and Alexander Girard used a conversation pit as the centerpiece of the influential Miller House (1958) in Columbus, Indiana, one of the earliest widely publicized applications of the concept. A red conversation pit (later covered, but recently restored) was later incorporated by Saarinen into the 1962 TWA Flight Center at John F. Kennedy International Airport in New York. Other influential residential projects include the 1955 Cohen House in Sarasota, Florida, by architect Paul Rudolph, for whom the conversation pit became a signature element, and many of Bruce Goff's houses beginning in the 1920s, including the Adah Robinson house in Tulsa, Oklahoma and the 1965 Nicol House in Kansas City, Missouri. The 1968–1969 Volcano House in Southern California, designed by architect Harold James Bissner Jr., has a conversation pit.

Many conversation pits have been filled in during renovation to create a uniform floor level. The conversation-pit concept influenced the popularity of the somewhat less radical sunken living room, most familiar from the Dick Van Dyke Show on TV. In the late 1990s conversation pits and sunken living rooms were offered in home plans as a way of creating an informal space within a large area.

== See also ==
- Inglenook, an intimate space that incorporates a fireplace
- Kiva, a meeting space used by Puebloans
