= Jonathan D. Schiller =

American lawyer

- Born: Jonathan David Schiller; September 25, 1946 (age 80)
- Education: Columbia University (BA, JD)
- Occupation: lawyer
- Known for: co-founding Boies Schiller Flexner LLP
- Spouses: Margaret Irwin Miller; Marla Prather
- Children: 3
- Parents: Irving Schiller (father); Patricia Schiller (mother)
- Relatives: J. Irwin Miller (father-in-law)

Jonathan David Schiller (born September 25, 1946) is an American lawyer who is a co-founder and managing partner of the law firm Boies Schiller Flexner LLP. He also chaired the board of trustees of Columbia University from 2013 to 2018.

== Biography ==
Schiller was born to Irving and Patricia Schiller, both of whom were lawyers who moved to Washington, D.C., during the New Deal. His father worked for the U.S. Securities and Exchange Commission and his mother worked at the U.S. Office of Price Administration, as well as the National Labor Relations Board, before joining the faculty at Howard University College of Medicine and becoming a nationally recognized sex and marriage therapist.

Schiller graduated from Landon School in Bethesda, Maryland in 1965. He is a 1969 graduate of Columbia University, where he was a star basketball player and a member of the 1967-68 Ivy League men's basketball championship team with future NBA players Jim McMillian and Dave Newmark. The team ranked fifth in the country. After college, he briefly taught at Georgetown Day School in Washington, D.C., before going on to earn his J.D. from Columbia Law School in 1973.

After graduating from Columbia, Schiller joined Arnold & Porter as an associate before moving to Rogovin, Stern & Huge, spending 17 year in the firm that was renamed Rogovin, Huge, and Schiller. In 1986, his client, Westinghouse Electric Company, decided to assign a civil corruption case alleging bribery of Ferdinand Marcos, former president of the Philippines, to David Boies at Cravath, Swaine & Moore instead of Schiller's litigation boutique. Previously, Schiller had successfully defended Westinghouse on two occasions, so he was invited by Boies to team up on behalf of the company. The two formed a close friendship, and in 1997, founded the law firm Boies Schiller Flexner LLP.

In 2009, he was named a trustee of Columbia University, and in 2013, co-chair of the trustees, serving alongside William Campbell. He was made sole chair of the board from 2015 to 2018.

== Awards and honors ==
Schiller received the John Jay Award in 2006 from Columbia College and the Alexander Hamilton Medal in 2012.

In 2017, Schiller was named to the inaugural class of "Legends of Ivy Basketball" for achievements and contributions to the Ivy League's basketball program. In 2020, Columbia dedicated the basketball court in Levien Gymnasium in his honor.

== Personal life and family ==
Schiller's first wife was Margaret Irwin Miller, daughter of J. Irwin Miller and granddaughter of Hugh Thomas Miller. They had three sons, Zachary Sweeney 'Zack' Schiller, Joshua Irwin 'Josh' Schiller, and Aaron Irwin Schiller, all of whom are alumni of Columbia University (graduates of either Columbia College or Columbia Law School).

He is currently married to Marla Prather, an art collector and former Whitney Museum curator who is the ex-wife of Mortimer Zuckerman.
