= Tulip chair =

Chair designed by Eero Saarinen

- Colors: White frame. Cushion red (cushion variable)
- Designer: Eero Saarinen
- Date: 1956
- Materials: Aluminium base, Fiberglass frame. Leather or fabric cushions
- Style / tradition: Modernist
- Height: 80 cm (31 in)
- Width: 50 cm (20 in)
- Depth: 56 cm (22 in)

The Tulip chair was designed by Eero Saarinen in 1955 and 1956 for the Knoll company of New York City. The designs were initially entitled the 'Pedestal Group' before Saarinen and Knoll settled on the more organic sounding 'Tulip chair' to mirror its inspiration from nature. It was designed primarily as a chair to match the complementary dining table. The chair has the smooth lines of modernism and was experimental with materials for its time. The chair is considered a classic example of industrial design.

The chair is often considered "Space Age" for its futuristic use of curves and artificial materials.

== Design and construction ==
Saarinen said: "The undercarriage of chairs and tables in a typical interior makes an ugly, confusing, unrestful world. I wanted to clear up the slum of legs. I wanted to make the chair all one thing again."

Saarinen had hoped to produce the chair as a one-piece unit made entirely of fiberglass, but this material was not able to support the base, and prototypes were prone to breakage. As a result, the base of the tulip chair is of cast aluminum with a rilsan-coated finish to match the upper shell, giving the appearance of a single unit. The upper shell is molded fiberglass, with a reinforced, plastic bonded finish. The upholstered foam cushion is removable with Velcro fastening.

Saarinen was awarded a patent for the Tulip chair in 1960.

== Awards ==
- Museum of Modern Art Award, 1969
- Federal Award for Industrial Design, 1969
- Design Center Stuttgart Award, 1962

== Project Cybersyn ==
In 1971, a modified form of the Tulip chair was used in the design of Project Cybersyn.

== See also ==
- List of chairs
- List of works by Eero Saarinen
