= Xenia Miller =

American philanthropist (1917–2008)

Xenia Simons Miller (July 9, 1917 – February 21, 2008) was a philanthropist and patron of art and modern architecture. She was married to the CEO of Cummins, J. Irwin Miller.

== Early life ==
Born in Morgantown, Indiana, to Nellie Hosetta Wellons and Luther A. Simons, Xenia Ruth Simons grew up in Bartholomew County and graduated from Columbus North High School in 1934. She attended Indiana Business College after high school.

Xenia married J. Irwin Miller in Washington, D.C., on February 3, 1943. They met while working at Cummins. J. Irwin and Xenia had five children: Margaret, Catherine, Elizabeth, Hugh, and William.

== Philanthropy ==
J. Irwin and Xenia worked together on many philanthropy projects. They were founding members of the North Christian Church in Columbus, Indiana, in 1955. Together they founded the Irwin-Sweeney-Miller Foundation and served as successive presidents.

Xenia helped found community groups in Bartholomew County, Indiana, including the Bartholomew Consolidated School Foundation and the William R. Laws Foundation. She helped spearhead revitalization efforts in downtown Columbus, including restoring Franklin Square and Storey House, and forming the Columbus Visitors Center.

Xenia served as a trustee and life member of the Indianapolis Museum of Art. She launched the Indianapolis Museum of Art-Columbus Gallery in 1974, which was located at the Columbus Visitors Center. In 1993, she donated money to create a new space attached to the Columbus Commons for the satellite gallery.

== Miller House and Gardens ==
In addition to their philanthropy of donating money towards bringing noted architects and artists' work to Columbus, Indiana, J. Irwin and Xenia worked with noted architect Eero Saarinen and interior designer Alexander Girard to design their home in Columbus. Xenia was influential in the design of the Miller House, working with Saarinen and Girard to direct the design.

In a letter to J. Irwin in 1943, Xenia wrote "Can you picture a very, very modern house with huge front windows, a flat rooftop built of something beige color coming out from under the trees at the edge of the woods on our hill?" The Miller House was built nearly ten years later in 1953.

Following Xenia's death on February 21, 2008, the family of J. Irwin and Xenia donated the home and gardens to the Indianapolis Museum of Art in 2009.

== Awards ==
In addition to joint recognitions and awards received with J. Irwin, Xenia received honorary doctorates from Butler University, St. Mary-of-the-Woods, MacMurray College, and Christian Theological Seminary. She was named one of the Most Influential Women in Indiana by the Indianapolis Star in 1974 and one of Indianapolis Monthly's five Most Influential Women in Indiana in 1984.
