= J. Irwin Miller =

American businessman (1909–2004)

- Born: Joseph Irwin Miller; May 26, 1909; Columbus, Indiana, U.S.
- Died: August 16, 2004 (aged 95); Columbus, Indiana, U.S.
- Education: Yale University (BA); Balliol College, Oxford
- Occupation: Businessman
- Known for: CEO of Cummins; Architecture patron
- Spouse: Xenia Simons (m. 1943)
- Children: 5
- Father: Hugh Thomas Miller
- Relatives: Jonathan D. Schiller (son-in-law)

Joseph Irwin Miller (May 26, 1909 – August 16, 2004) was an American industrialist, patron of modern architecture, and lay leader in the Christian ecumenical movement and civil rights. He was instrumental in the rise of the Cummins Corporation and in giving his home town (Columbus, Indiana) international stature with its modern architecture buildings.

== Biography ==
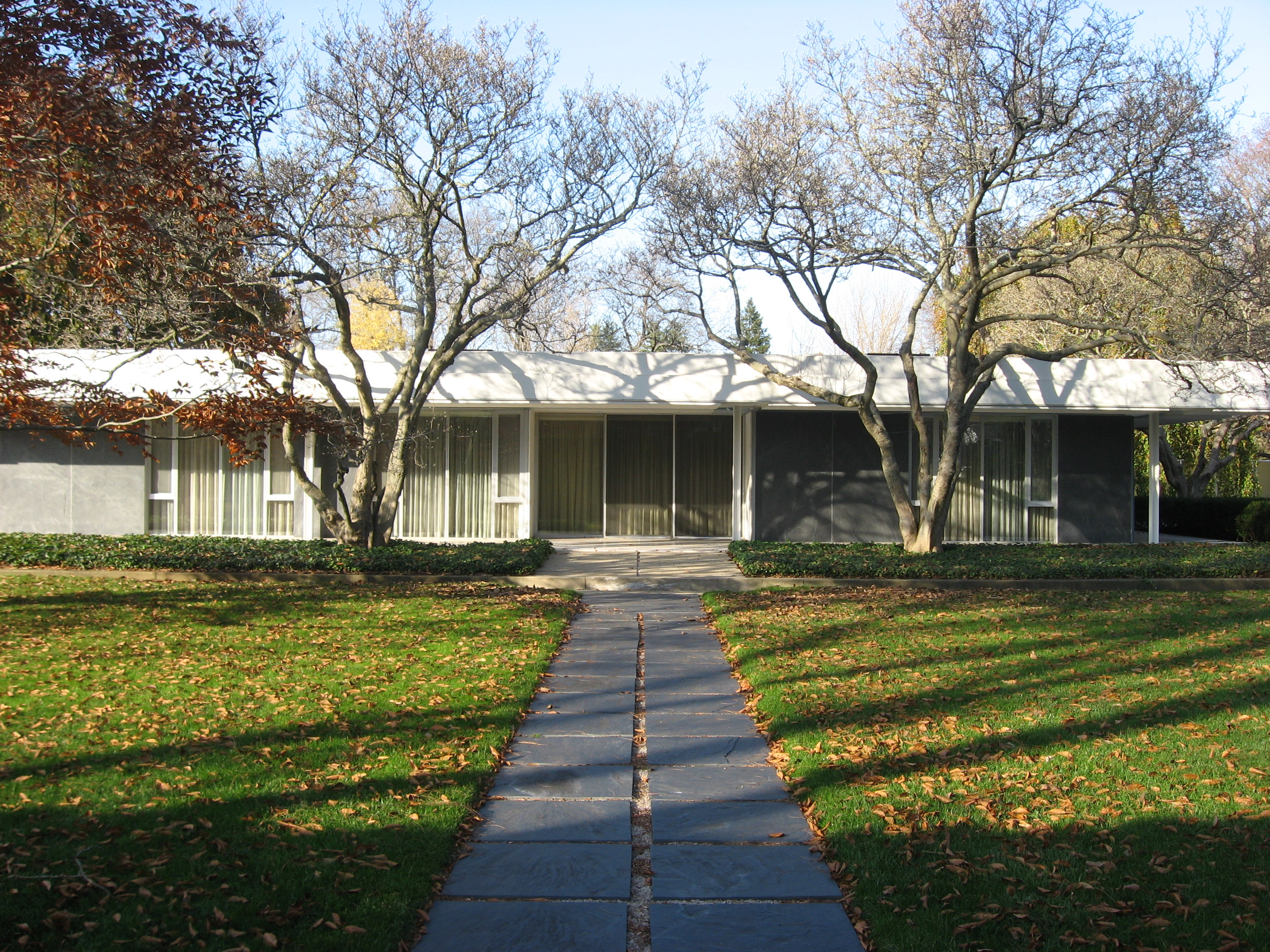
Front of the Miller House in Columbus

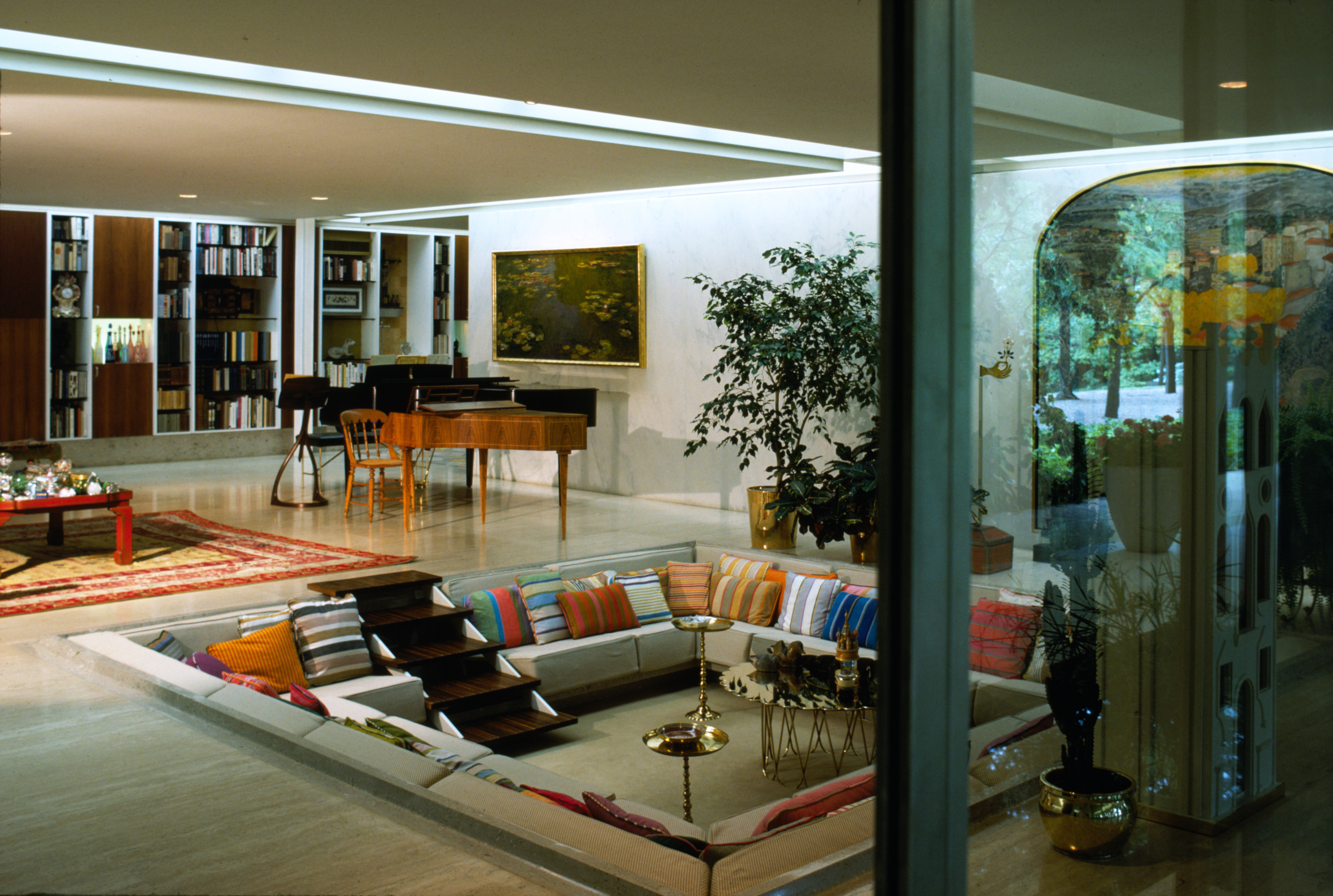
"Conversation Pit" in the Miller House

Miller was born in Columbus, Indiana, to Hugh Thomas Miller, a college professor and politician, and Nettie Irwin Sweeney. He had one sister, Elizabeth Clementine Miller (1905–1996), who married Robert Stone Tangeman. He was the grandnephew of William Glanton Irwin.

He was a 1931 graduate of Yale University and made Phi Beta Kappa. From 1931 to 1933, Miller studied Philosophy, Politics and Economics (PPE) at Balliol College, Oxford, which made him an Honorary Fellow in 1974.

On February 5, 1943, he married Xenia Simons. They had three daughters, Margaret Irwin, Catherine Gibbs, and Elizabeth Garr, and two sons, Hugh Thomas II and William Irwin. Margaret was married to Jonathan D. Schiller, co-founder of Boies Schiller Flexner LLP. He had ten grandchildren – Jonathan, Zachary, Joshua, Benjamin, Aaron, Andrew, AnnaCatherine, Katherine, Laura, and Emily.

The Miller House in Columbus, which was designed by Eero Saarinen, was declared a U.S. National Historic Landmark in 2000. After the death of Miller's widow in 2008, the house was donated to the Indianapolis Museum of Art in 2009. The family's Canadian summer home on Lake Rosseau near Windermere, Ontario, was also designed by Saarinen.

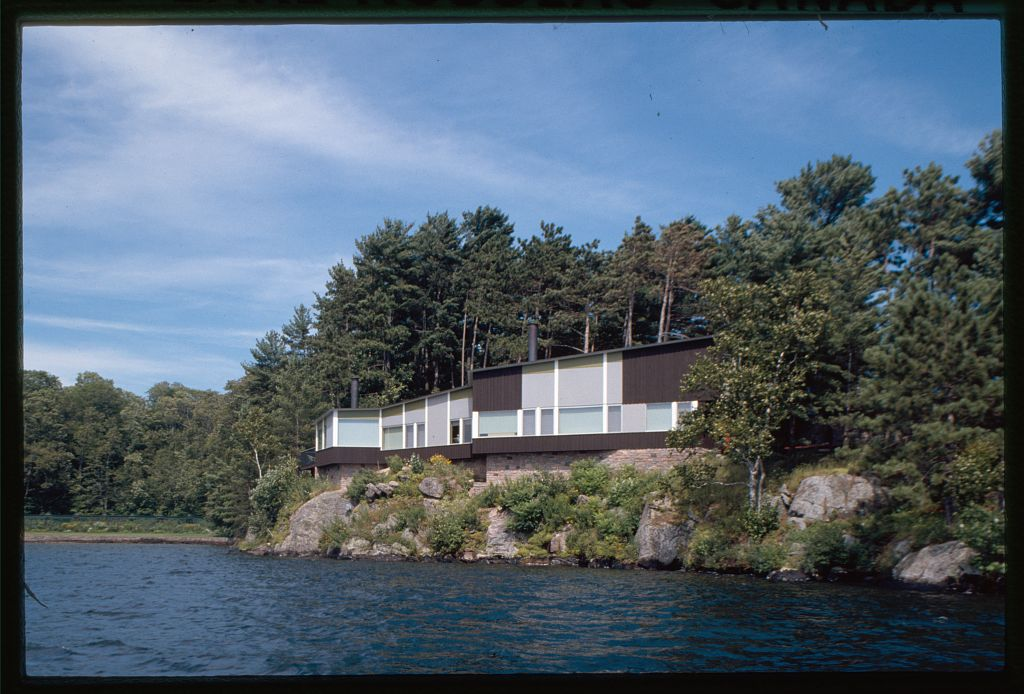
The Miller family's cottage on Lake Rosseau in Ontario, Canada

== Work ==
Miller joined Cummins, the family business, in 1934. He was executive vice president from 1944 to 1947, president from 1947 to 1951, and chairman from 1951 to 1977. He served as a lieutenant in the U.S. Navy in the South Pacific during the Second World War.

In 1950, Miller helped to establish the National Council of Churches (NCC) and later served as its first lay president (1960–63). Miller chaired the NCC's Commission on Religion and Race, which coordinated organized religion's support for strong civil rights legislation, and jointly sponsored the March on Washington. He led religious delegations that met with Presidents John F. Kennedy and Lyndon Johnson to push for the legislation that became the Civil Rights Act of 1964.

In 1954, he established the Cummins Foundation and in 1957 made an offer to Columbus that the foundation would pay all the architects' fees for new public buildings in Columbus. Thus this small Midwestern city has buildings by Eero Saarinen, Eliel Saarinen, I.M. Pei, Kevin Roche, Richard Meier, Harry Weese, César Pelli, Gunnar Birkerts, and Skidmore, Owings & Merrill, many of which feature extensive interiors designed by Alexander Girard. "Some people have a tombstone at the head of their gravesite or the foot of it," Columbus resident William Beaver wrote. "Mr. Miller had the whole town as a monument." The American Institute of Architects in 1991 declared Columbus America's sixth most important city in terms of architecture. In addition to altruism, Miller used architecture to entice the best people to work for Cummins.

Miller served as a Trustee of the Ford Foundation and Yale University, and as a director of Chemical Bank. He established the Irwin-Sweeney-Miller Foundation, which supports numerous charities and institutions—notably, Christian Theological Seminary in Indianapolis and Emma Willard School, a leading girls' preparatory school in Troy, NY. The family's business interests were widespread, and he served at various times as Chairman of Irwin Union Bank in Columbus IN, Union Starch and Refining Company, and Irwin Management Company.

Irwin Management was the family's private wealth-management and services organization, funded from Mr. Miller's large Cummins Engine Co. dividends and the income generated by other holdings. The group managed all of the family's assets except Cummins Engine—which Mr. Miller managed personally, as President and later as Chairman. IMCO, as it was called, was divided into departments for Marketable Securities, Oil and Gas, Real Estate, Venture Capital, Financial Planning and Analysis, and Family Services. The company was staffed by about 20 professionals, many of whom had MBA degrees from the leading graduate business schools (e.g., Harvard, Columbia, Chicago, Carnegie-Mellon, Stanford, Oxford). In addition to financial management, the company provided staff services to assist Mr. Miller's roles in philanthropic, foundation, directorship, and trustee positions. It was considered a high-status firm among MBA students, and there was spirited competition for jobs at IMCO upon graduation.

He was active in politics, persuading New York governor Nelson A. Rockefeller to run for president in 1968 (and served as national campaign chairman) and in 1972 he supported New York City Mayor John Lindsay's presidential bid.

Miller also served as a trustee of the Museum of Modern Art, the Ford Foundation, and was a member of the Yale Corporation, which governs the university. In 1986 he received the National Building Museum's first Honor Award. He was a member of both the American Academy of Arts and Sciences and the American Philosophical Society.

== Legacy ==
Upon Miller's death in 2004, the National Council of Churches in the United States instituted an annual J. Irwin Miller Award. The award is presented annually to "a lay person who has been a witness, through action in the world, to justice and other values affirmed by Christian faith, and who has demonstrated a commitment to church unity."

In 2016 Exhibit Columbus launched the J. Irwin and Xenia S. Miller Prize, an award given to artists, architects, and designers whose work is for the benefit of communities.

J. Irwin Miller aided in a donation of $1.5million of $2million for construction through the Irwin-Sweeney-Miller Foundation to Butler University, constructing the 'Irwin Library' (1963, designed by Minoru Yamasaki).

== Other sources ==
- Chris Poynter. "Building a Legacy: Visionary set town apart." Louisville Courier-Journal. August 22, 2004.
- Carol Fouke. "An NCC Founding Father Dies; Led Work on Race, Peace." National Council of Churches News Service. August 18, 2004.
