= Cleo Rogers Memorial Library =

Public library in Columbus, Indiana, US

- Main Library
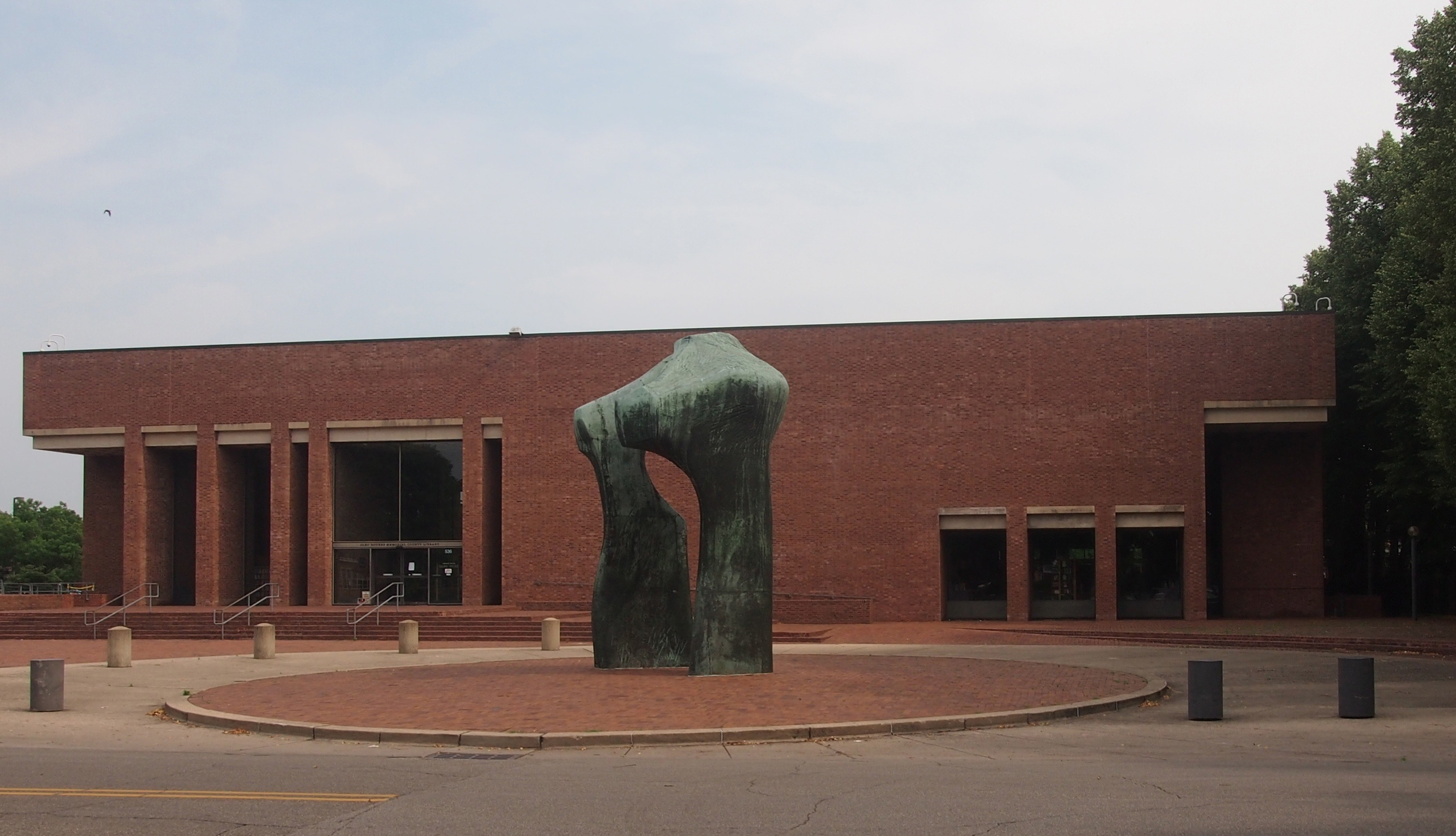
- Interactive map of the Cleo Rogers Memorial Library area

General information
- Type: Public Library
- Architectural style: International
- Location: 536 Fifth Street, Columbus, Indiana
- Coordinates: 39°12′14.23″N 85°55′8.02″W
- Construction started: December 1966
- Completed: December 1969
- Inaugurated: May 1971
- Renovated: 1989
- Cost: $2,007,000
- Owner: Bartholomew County Library Association

Technical details
- Structural system: Brick and concrete
- Floor count: Original 52,500 + Addition 11,700

Design and construction
- Architect: I.M. Pei
- Architecture firm: I. M. Pei & Partners
- Structural engineer: Weiskopf & Pickworth
- Services engineer: Segner and Dalton
- Other designers: Kenneth D.B. Carruthers
- Main contractor: Dunlap & Company

Renovating team
- Architect: James K. Paris
- Renovating firm: Architect Group, Inc

Website
- http://www.barth.lib.in.us

The Cleo Rogers Memorial Library, also known as the Main Library, is the flagship library of the Bartholomew County Public Library system in Bartholomew County, Indiana, US. It includes a branch in Hope, another branch under construction at the North Christian Church in Columbus, and a bookmobile that serves the county. The building was designed by I. M. Pei & Partners and constructed by Dunlap & Company, completed in 1969, and dedicated in 1971. It is notable for its design of red brick with concrete details and its Library Plaza, an urban space punctuated by the sculpture "Large Arch" by Henry Moore. It is named for Cleo Rogers (1905–1964) who was the county librarian for 28 years and assistant librarian for nine years.

== History ==
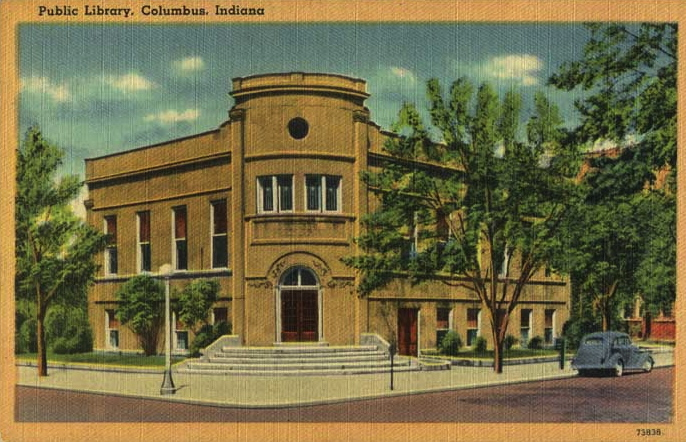
A postcard showing the first public library in Columbus, Indiana, the "Columbus Public Library," which was dedicated in 1903. The building was demolished before the current building opened.

In 1899 a library in the county first began occupying two rooms inside the original Columbus City Hall at the southwest corner of Fifth and Franklin Streets. The library's immediate popularity led the community to request funds from the well-known philanthropist, Andrew Carnegie, who was widely known for financing the construction of libraries throughout the United States.

While Columbus has always contained the main branch of the Bartholomew County system, a branch has existed in Hope, Indiana in various locations at the same time. In 1966 a rented space was acquired on the town square and in 1998 a dedicated branch was opened that was designed by Deborah Berke & Partners Architects.

=== The Columbus Public Library ===
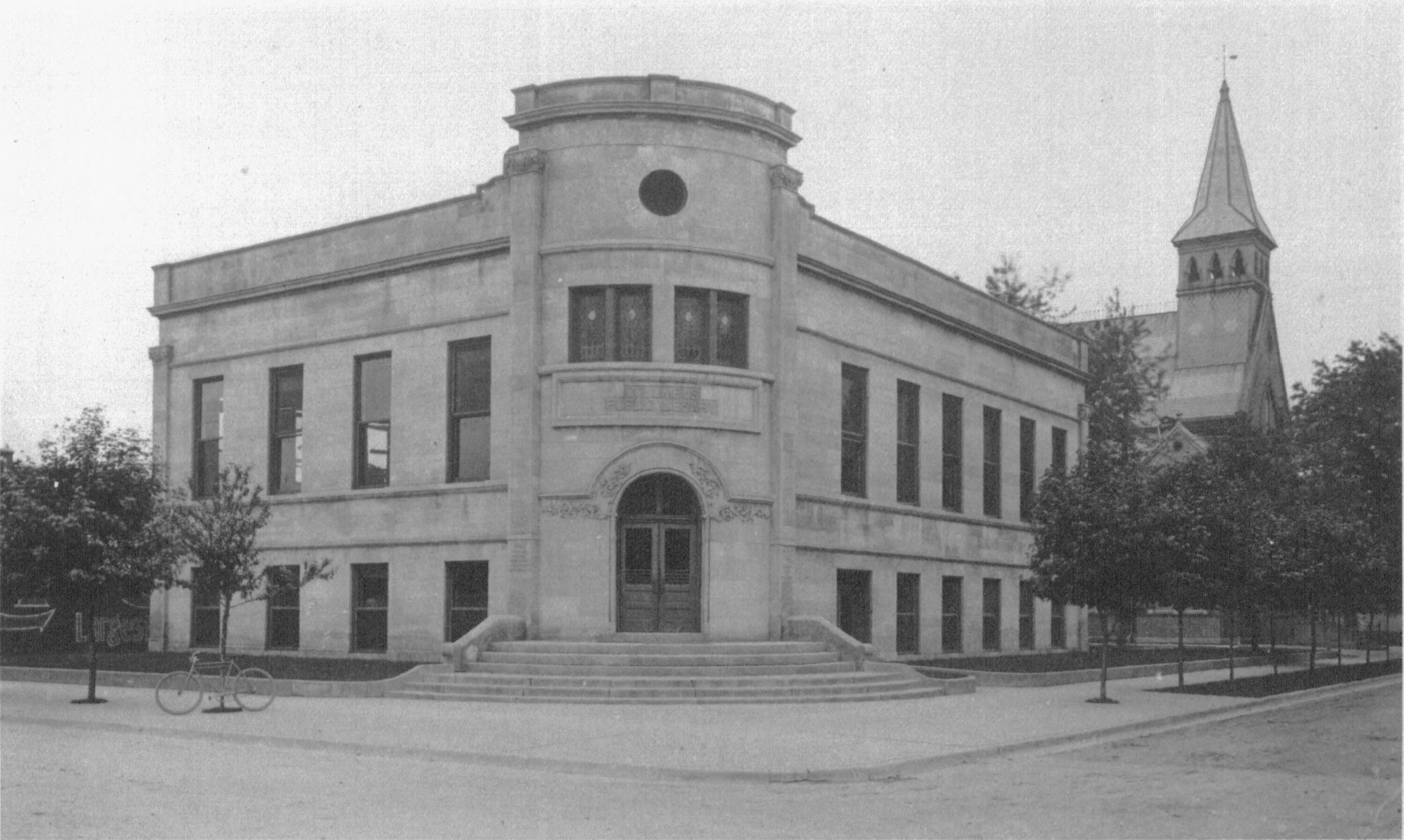
Photograph of Columbus, Indiana Columbus Public Library from 1909.

The first library in Bartholomew County stood on the corner of what was then Fifth and Mechanics Street (Mechanics was later renamed to Lafayette Avenue). This plot of land was donated to the county by Columbus resident Joseph I. Irwin. The original building was designed by John W. Gaddis of Vincennes, Indiana and dedicated on June 1, 1903. The construction cost was $19,200 with $15,000 coming from a donation from Andrew Carnegie and the remaining $4,200 obtained from taxation. This library was then known as the "Columbus Public Library," but after 1923 became known as the "Columbus-Bartholomew County Library" with service to the entire county.

=== A new library needed ===
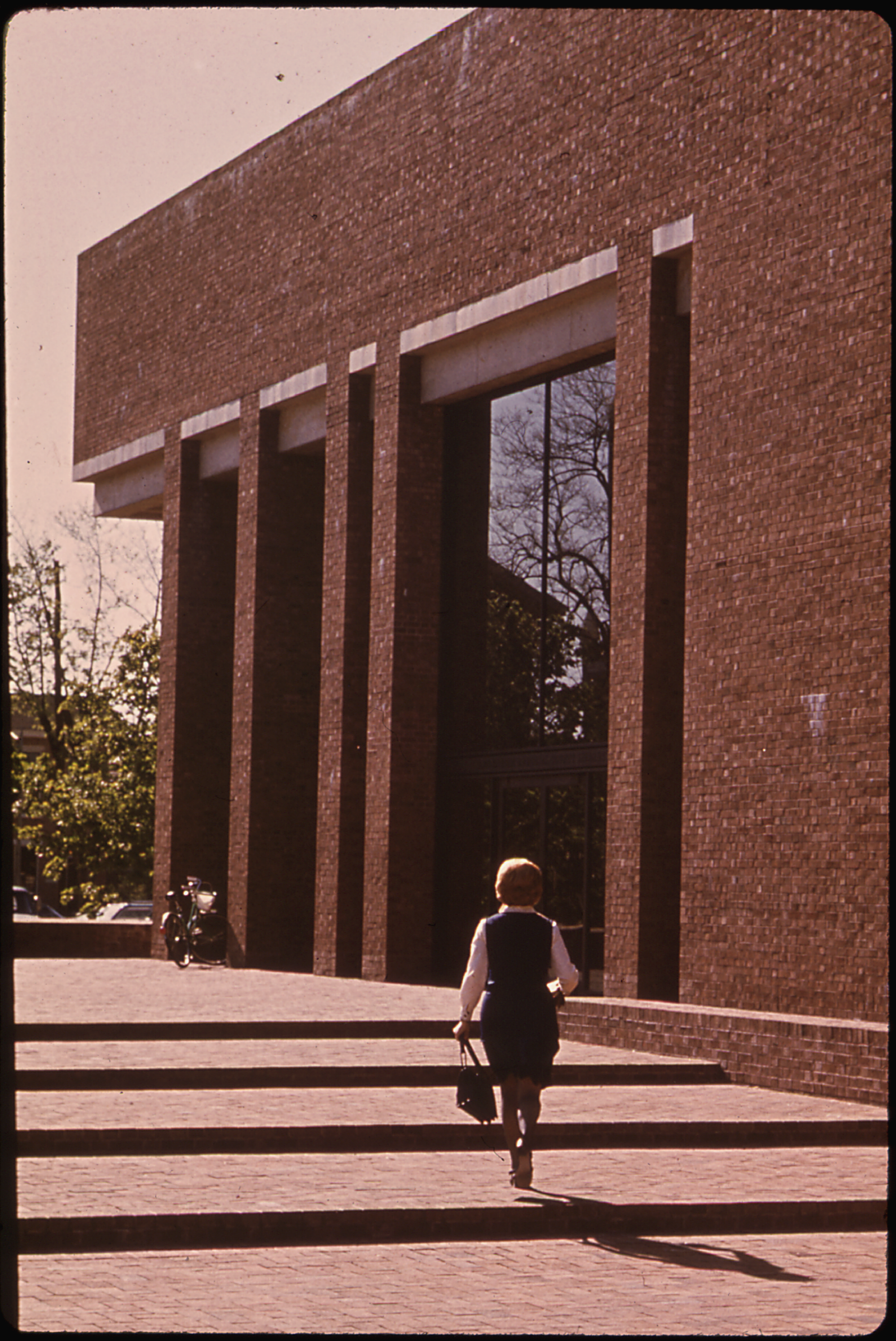
Walking up the entrance steps.

By the late 1950s the needs of the county had outgrown the first building and required a larger library. The project was funded by a $1 million bond and donations from the community, including an $800,000 grant from Cummins Engine Foundation. However, this project was not directly part of the Cummins Foundation Architectural Program.

==== The Cleo Rogers Memorial Library ====
From the beginning, the intention of the library and the plaza was to transform this part of the city so that it would positively affect the surrounding area and encourage residents to stay downtown. The completion of this project also meant the demolition of the old library building and the closure of Lafayette Avenue between fifth and sixth.

By the early 1960s a number of modern buildings by young architects had been built in Columbus through the Cummins Foundation Architectural Program, however this building was not one of those projects. The Bartholomew County Library Association Board decided on their own to work with Pei.

When Pei was offered the opportunity to build the library, he seized it in order to create a project that would transform the downtown area with the addition of a civic plaza in front of the library. The design and placement of the library, plaza, and sculpture directly relate to and recognize the design of First Christian Church (designed by Eliel Saarinen and completed in 1942), and the Irwin House, (designed by Henry Ayling Phillips, and completed in 1910). Pei felt that the project "should occupy a space which would be quiet yet dignified; that it be easily accessible to the great majority of people, both young and old; that is location create an area of urban space, and that it take into consideration the future growth of the community and its character."

Brick was used as the primary building material for the library, and as a traditional load bearing masonry system; concrete and limestone is used as detailed elements. This brick pavilion has solid walls on the east and west and has its main entrance off center at the west end. The deeply recessed windows associated with the entrance are of a scale that relate to First Christian Church across the street, while the windows on the east end are shorter and relate to the scale of the sculpture and the Irwin house nearby.

Inside the building the brick, concrete, and limestone details carry through. The ceiling is a coffered concrete system with deep inset square elements that contain light fixtures.

==== Library Plaza ====
The Library Plaza was a significant part of Pei's design. Before the Library Plaza was built there were few civic gathering spots in the city. The first park in the city, known as Commercial Park, Central Park, and City Park, remained just east of the first Columbus City Hall on the site which is now part of the courtyard of the First Christian Church. Pei believed that by creating the Library Plaza he would be creating the first "truly urban space" to Columbus.

At the 1971 dedication, I. M. Pei spoke about the importance of the interrelationship between the parts of the Library Plaza: "So here I am today very proud, and very happy to dedicate the Library, and also to dedicate the 'Large Arch', but more important than both of these is to be here to dedicate this open space, which is now yours. Eliel Saarinen's church, our building here, Moore's 'Arch', Irwin's house, each is made more important by the presence of this open space, yet this open space is more than the sum of all of these."

The same brick and concrete materials used on the library were used on the plaza. Pei's hope was that the plaza would be compared to the vital public plazas of European cities. For many years, the Library Plaza has been used for art fairs, concerts, and other community events including "Popfest," which existed for 29 years.

==== Large Arch ====
Large Arch (LH 503b) is an outdoor sculpture by British sculptor Henry Moore. It was installed in 1971 and is located in the outdoor plaza of the Cleo Rogers Memorial Library in Columbus, Indiana. Xenia and J. Irwin Miller commissioned the sculpture and gave it to the library. The sculpture is nearly 20 feet tall and is made of sandcast bronze that has been patinated.

=== 1987 Library addition ===
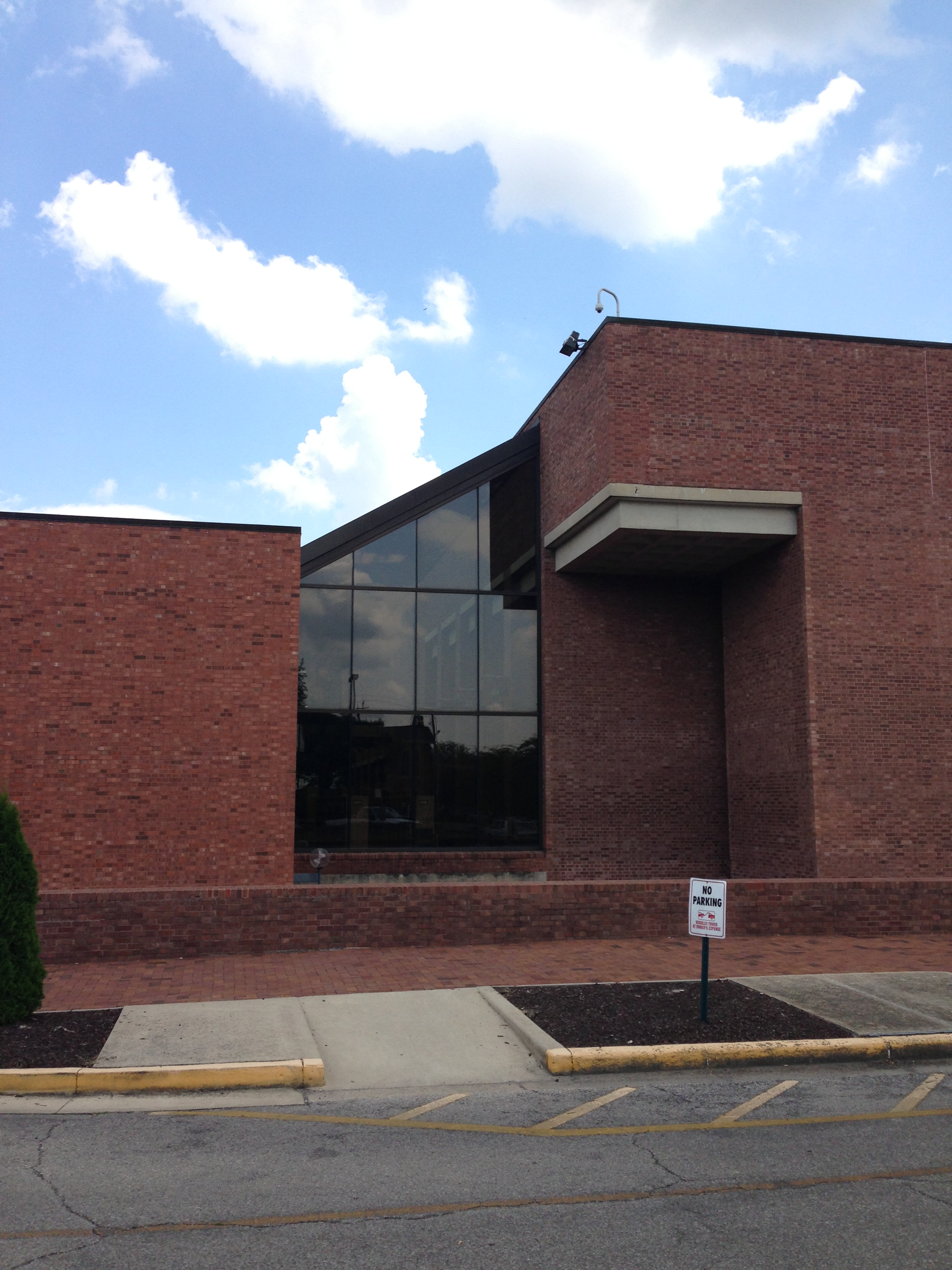
The angled glass marks the start of the 1987 addition to the library by Paris

After 15 years, it was clear that library offerings needed to be expanded. Columbus-based architect James K. Paris of Architect Group, Inc. was chosen to make an addition to the back of the building in order to add the "Indiana Room," which houses books relating to Columbus, Bartholomew County, the State of Indiana, and family history; it also added room for the fiction collection and reference section.

The addition was highlighted by the addition of a two-story glass covered atrium that joins the two buildings. This addition occupies a space at the back of the building that was designed to be an outdoor courtyard.

=== 2004 Library Plaza renovation ===
The Library Plaza was renovated to accommodate a wheelchair accessible ramp on the west side of the plaza. This work was completed in a brick sympathetic to that which was used originally in the 1960s.

=== 2013 Library Plaza renovation ===
By early 2012, the Library Board began considering alterations to the plaza that would better connect the Columbus Area Visitors Center and the Library, and at the same time make the Library Plaza more inviting for visitors. After considerable discussion and some revision through community meetings and discussions with Pei Cobb Freed & Partners, a plan was created that preserved the original intentions of Pei. In the end, this solution and process were celebrated by community leaders.

== In popular culture ==
The library is featured in the 2017 drama film Columbus. It also appears in the 2025 heist film The Mastermind as the exterior of a fictional art museum.

== See also ==
- List of I. M. Pei projects
- Modern architecture
