= North Christian Church =

Building in Columbus, Indiana, US

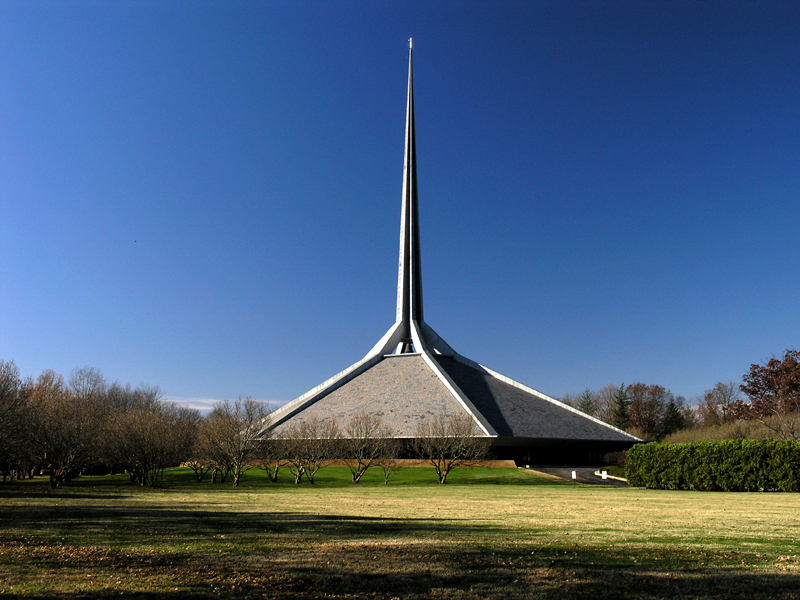
- North Christian Church
- 39°13′47″N 85°54′58″W
- Address: 850 Tipton Lane, Columbus, Indiana
- Country: United States
- Denomination: Disciples of Christ

History
- Status: Disbanded
- Founded: April 24, 1955
- Dedicated: April 19, 1964

Architecture
- Architects: Eero Saarinen (main architect); Kevin Roche (associate); Dan Kiley (landscape); Alexander Girard (interior, furnishings)
- Style: Modern
- Groundbreaking: September 2, 1962
- Completed: March 8, 1964
- Construction cost: $1.0–1.3 million (1964)
- Closed: July 16, 2022 (congregation)

Specifications
- Capacity: 445–470 (sanctuary); 420 (basement auditorium)
- Length: 210 ft (64 m) (west–east)
- Width: 106 ft (32 m) (north–south)
- North Christian Church
- U.S. National Register of Historic Places
- U.S. National Historic Landmark
- Area: 13.5 acres (5.5 ha) (grounds)
- Architectural style: Modern
- MPS: Modernism in Architecture, Landscape Architecture, Design, and Art in Bartholomew County, 1942–1965 MPS
- NRHP reference No.: 00000705

Significant dates
- Added to NRHP: May 16, 2000
- Designated NHL: May 16, 2000

The North Christian Church is a building and former congregation at 850 Tipton Lane in Columbus, Indiana, United States. Designed by Eero Saarinen and completed in 1964, the 192-foot-tall (59 m) structure originally housed a Protestant Disciples of Christ congregation of the same name. The interior designer Alexander Girard, the landscape architect Dan Kiley, and Saarinen's associate Kevin Roche assisted with various parts of the design. The building has been owned by the Bartholomew County Public Library since 2024. The design has received praise over the years, particularly for its spire and iconography, and was frequently compared to the First Christian Church, designed by Saarinen's father Eliel Saarinen. In addition, the building is designated as a National Historic Landmark.

The church building is set on 13-acre (5.3 ha) grounds designed by Kiley. The grounds include a berm surrounding the building, with entrances accessed by driveways to the west and east, as well as various trees arranged across the site. The building has a hexagonal floor plan. Above a glass curtain wall, ribs divide a slate roof into six sections supporting the central metal spire. The base of the spire includes an oculus that admits light inside. The interior, designed by Girard, is split across two main levels, accessed by a narthex on an intermediate level. The lower level contains classrooms, an auditorium, a kitchen, and a chapel. The bowl-shaped sanctuary, on the upper story, consists of a central communion table, surrounded by pews on five sides and a pulpit, organ, and choir loft on the sixth.

The North Christian Church congregation was founded in late 1955, and one of its early members, the industrialist J. Irwin Miller, helped the congregation acquire a plot of land in 1958. After interviewing various architects, the congregation's building committee hired Saarinen in 1959, and the plans were finalized shortly before his death two years later. A groundbreaking ceremony took place in 1962, and the building hosted its first service on March 8, 1964. Over the years, the congregation made numerous modifications to the building and expanded the grounds. By the early 21st century, the congregation faced dwindling membership and was unable to maintain the building. After the congregation was disbanded on July 16, 2022, the Bartholomew County Public Library took over the structure. The library system renamed the building The LEX: the Library of Experience, intending to renovate it into a library branch.

== Site ==
The North Christian Church building is located at 850 Tipton Lane in Columbus, Indiana, United States. The 13.5-acre (5.5 ha) site is flat and sits roughly between U.S. Route 31 to the north, Home Avenue to the east, Tipton Lane to the south, and Sycamore Street to the west. Due to the area's street grid, Tipton Lane is split into two offset sections at Sycamore Street. Just north of the T-intersection with the eastern section of Tipton Lane, Sycamore Street turns west, becoming the western section of Tipton Lane. Sycamore Street does not intersect U.S. 31, though there was a proposal in 1960 to extend Sycamore Street to U.S. 31, which would have cut through the property. The surrounding area consists mostly of low-density residences. Before the church building was constructed, the western part of the site was a field, while the eastern part was a forest.

The grounds were designed by Dan Kiley, who had worked with the church building's architect Eero Saarinen at the Miller House and Irwin Union Bank in Columbus and the Gateway Arch in St. Louis, Missouri. The former North Christian Church congregation had purchased the western portion of the property first, followed later by land to the east. Kiley was involved with both the original landscape design and subsequent modifications. The final landscape design dates from 1974, three years after the final piece of property was acquired. The landscape design was intended to limit observers' views of the building before they approached it. The design had been diluted by the late 1970s, when a neighbor built a brick house right in front of the church building.

=== Berm and driveways ===
The church building is near the site's western boundary and is surrounded by a 6-foot-tall (1.8 m) berm. When the building opened, the berm was nicknamed the Mount of Expectation, since it was supposed to give the feeling that something significant would happen to congregants attending services there. Moats run along the berm to the north and south, letting natural light into the building. Each moat extends 5 to 6 feet (1.5 to 1.8 m) outward from the building's base and contains various plantings. Vehicle drop-offs, above the berm, adjoin entrances on the western and eastern elevations of the building. Stairs descend from both drop-offs to the entrances, and further steps descend into the moats. There is also a ventilation shaft near the western entrance.

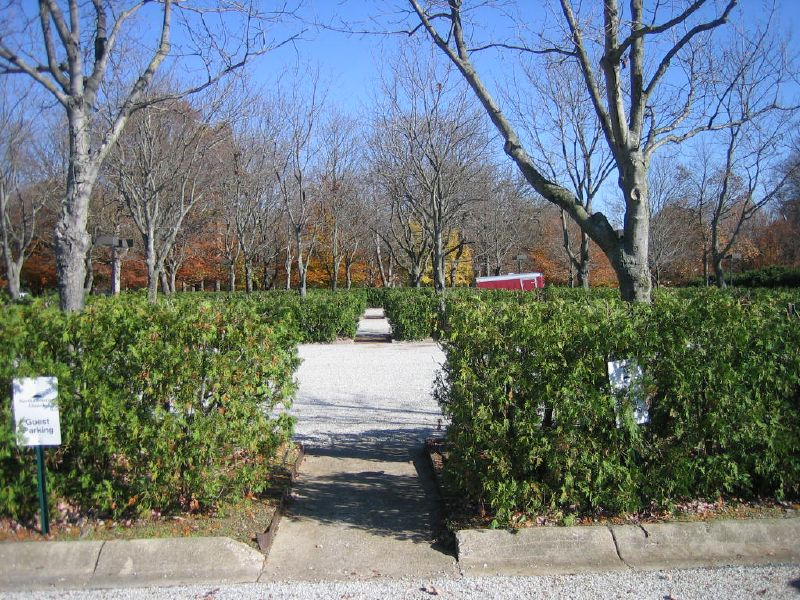
Hedges divide the parking lot into four sections.

A driveway leads from the curve where Sycamore Street becomes Tipton Lane, near the southwest corner of the site. East of the building, a pair of one-way driveways leads from Tipton Lane, ending at a parking lot. The eastern driveways travel through a grove of native hardwoods, planted so that visitors on the driveways cannot see the building until they reach the parking lot. The parking lot itself is divided into four sections by 6-foot-high (1.8 m) hedges made of arborvitae, and there are additional hedges surrounding the parking lot on all sides except the west, concealing parked cars from view. The layout of the hedges evokes the pews in traditional churches. Both the western driveway and the parking lot lead to one-way loops, which connect with the vehicle drop-offs. A pathway leads from the parking lot to the steps outside the main entrance, passing through the vehicle drop-off.

=== Other landscape features ===
The site had previously been a field, and all of the trees there were added as part of Kiley's landscape design. Two parallel rows of maple trees, planted in the shape of offset dashed lines, run along Tipton Lane on the southern boundary of the site. The maple trees form an allée that surrounds the property. The entrances on the western and eastern elevations are flanked by dwarf crabapple trees. Adjoining the northern and southern elevations, the moats have myrtle trees, and there is a magnolia grove beyond. The berms on these elevations have grass plantings, which replaced the original cotoneaster and yew plants. Kiley's landscape design retained some trees on the easternmost part of the site, which already existed when the church building was built.

Early plans called for memorial plaques to be embedded into the berm, with each plaque honoring a deceased congregant. Southeast of the church building is a memorial garden planted in 1995, with 43 trees representing the original members of the congregation. The garden, designed by Todd Williams, contains wooden plaques and a bench. The original plans called for a sculpture and a wall made of slate, which were never built.

== Architecture ==
The North Christian Church was designed by Eero Saarinen and Associates, with Eero Saarinen as primary architect. Alexander Girard was responsible for many of the interior furnishings, including objects used for liturgy. Van Zelm, Heywood & Shadford received the mechanical engineering contract, while Henry Pfisterer received the structural engineering contract. Other contractors included acoustic consultant Bolt, Beranek & Newman, food-service contractor Howard L. Post, and lighting consultant Stanley McCandless. Repp and Mundt were the church building's general contractors.

The building's footprint is hexagonal and is stretched along a west–east axis. In designing the building, Saarinen wanted to create a modern-styled building that was dominated by its sanctuary, as in traditional churches. He believed that modern churches were not as grand as traditional churches, and that secondary spaces such as Sunday schools, gymnasiums, and kitchens detracted from the significance of the church building itself. To emphasize the sanctuary, Saarinen placed most of the rooms in the basement, leaving only the sanctuary above ground. The shape was inspired by the Jewish Star of David, an allusion to how the Christian faith was derived from Judaism. The North Christian Church was built for, and used by, a congregation of the same name that disbanded in 2022.

=== Exterior ===
The church building's basement is slightly below the site's original grade but is almost completely surrounded by the concrete berm, leaving only the roof and spire visible. Saarinen was inspired by the steep steps at Angkor Wat and Borobudur, where visitors had to interact with the architecture and work to reach the sanctuary. He thought that building an entire church on one level made religion "too easy" and detracted from the spiritual experience of going to church. Therefore, he placed the sanctuary above the berm and basement. Saarinen wrote that "you should have to work for it and it should be a special thing", referencing how congregants had to climb up the berm before climbing back down to the entrance. The design also gave the impression that the sanctuary was floating above the basement.

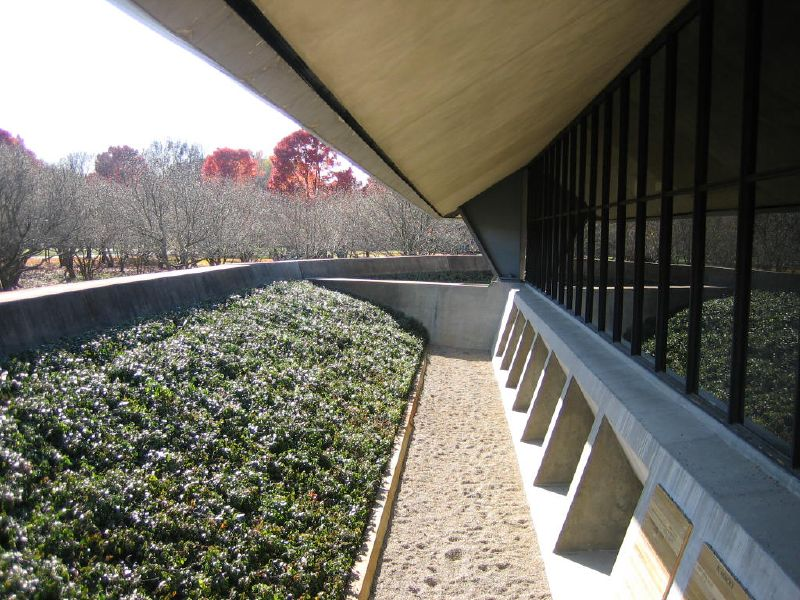
View of the exterior as seen from entrance level. The curtain wall is visible at right.

On the first floor, the facade is a curtain wall composed of single-layered glazed panels separated by wooden mullions. The glass panels are 12 feet (3.7 m) tall and are separated into 4-foot-wide (1.2 m) bays. Transom bars run horizontally across each bay approximately 8 feet 4.5 inches (2.553 m) above grade. The windows on the curtain wall cannot be opened. Each corner of the hexagon has a steel buttress, which is welded to a concrete base and flares outward as it ascends. These buttresses contain downspouts that collect water from the roof gutters, emptying into concrete drainage basins around the building. The main entrance is on the east, where four double doors lead into a vestibule; a side entrance to the west leads to the baptistry in the basement.

==== Roof and spire ====
The eaves, which form the roof's perimeter, extend about 12 feet (3.7 m) from the facade and are low to the ground. The lead-coated copper fascia above the eaves is sloped upward, with a copper gutter concealed behind it. The soffit beneath the eaves is made of plaster and slopes down to about 8 feet (2.4 m) above grade. The roof itself is divided into six sections, which are clad in blue-black slate shingles, sloping upward toward the center of the building. Each section of the roof is separated by a steel rib with a copper cladding. The ribs converge at an oculus opening at the center of the roof, just below the spire. The oculus opening contains bells, which are visible between each of the ribs. The roof gave the impression of a "steel hat sitting over a concrete bowl", as the building's structural engineer Henry Pfisterer put it.

The spire reaches 192 feet (59 m) above ground and rises 117 feet (36 m) or 132 feet (40 m) from the oculus. When the church was completed, it was visible several miles away. The spire was intended to evoke spires in older Christian churches, which usually functioned as the focal points of these buildings.

On this site, with this kind of central plan, I think I would like to make the church really all one form: all the tower. There would be the gradual building up of the sheltering, hovering planes becoming the spire. The spire would not be put on a box or come up from the sides of the roof, as we did at Stephens College. The whole thing, all the planes, would grow up organically into the spire.

The spire is made of copper and is coated with a substance to prevent it from oxidizing and turning green; instead, the copper was intended to turn gray as it aged, matching the roof color. From the outside of the building, the spire symbolized reaching upward to God. Saarinen wanted the building's design to remove man from the earthly world, so instead of anchoring the building to the ground with solid rectangles, Saarinen used pointed angular forms that hover and point to the heavens. At the top of the spire was a 5-by-2.5-foot (1.5 by 0.8 m) gold leaf cross, which was intended to indicate that the building was a Christian house of worship. The cross was removed in 2024 following the congregation's disbanding.

=== Interior ===
The church building spans 210 feet (64 m) west–east and 106 feet (32 m) north–south, with a total floor area of 33,000 square feet (3,100 m^{2}). It spans two full levels: a nave or sanctuary on the upper level, and other functions in the basement. Both levels are hexagonal, and there is a narthex on an intermediate level. The basement's perimeter and the upper level share a plaster ceiling, which itself is a continuation of the soffit underneath the roof. The building relies entirely on a mechanical air-circulation system, since none of the windows on the facade can be opened. As a result, the interior is heated and cooled by an underfloor air distribution system. Air from these pipes is funneled into the rooms through hidden openings in the millwork. The sanctuary, on the upper level, is cooled by underfloor ducts and an empty plenum space beneath its center. The interior is divided largely into hexagonal spaces, interspersed with irregularly-shaped rooms that are used as washrooms and storage closets.

The former congregation's collection included five artworks by Gwang Hyuk Ree, a North Korean who created portraits of Christ and other religious figures using text from English and Korean versions of the Bible. Girard's wife Susan designed a tapestry, which depicted the tree of life and was displayed at the pulpit. Girard himself was responsible for many of the decorations, which contained symbolism related to the congregation and the Christian faith itself. When the building operated as a church, the communion table in the upper-level sanctuary held a silver chalice, communion trays, flower holders, and wrought-iron candelabras designed by Girard.

==== Narthex ====
The main entrance leads to a narthex at the building's eastern corner. The narthex has a stair and a double door ascending west to the upper-level sanctuary, as well as stairs descending to the basement on either side. The stairs to the basement are concealed by wooden screens. There is one bench on either side of the entrance doors, on the vestibule's eastern wall. The narthex was deliberately enlarged to encourage people to mingle and interact. The cloakrooms were in the basement, requiring congregants to return to the narthex after dropping off their clothes. Saarinen also intended the narthex to be a "decompression chamber" separating the sanctuary and the outdoors.

==== Basement ====
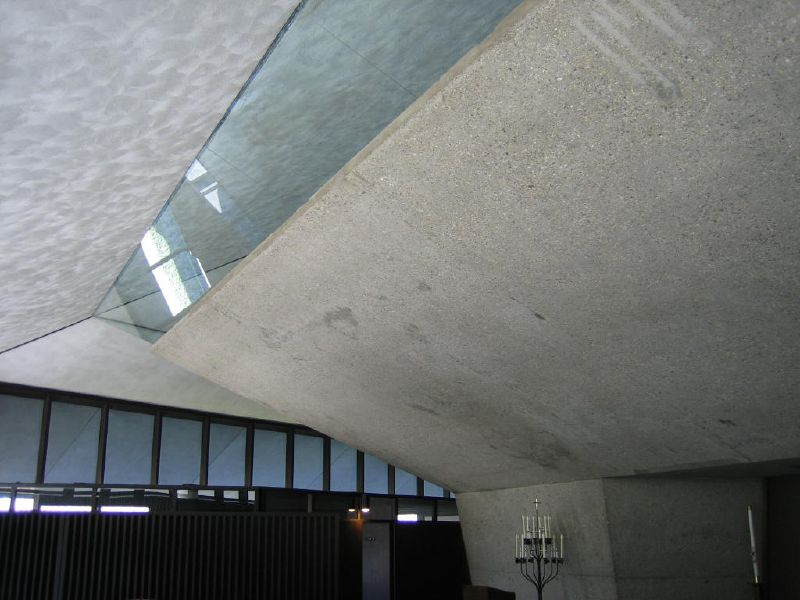
View of the basement hallway, with bush-hammered concrete ceiling (left) and overhanging concrete wall (right) separated by glass panels

The basement, accessed by pairs of stairs at both the building's east and west ends, is arranged around a concrete core. This core has spaces such as restrooms, cloakrooms, and dressing rooms. These spaces have polished-concrete floors, except for the dressing rooms (which have ceramic tiles) and the bathrooms (which have porcelain tiles). There is also an auditorium within the core, directly below the sanctuary. The auditorium could seat 420 people and had a movable stage, a ceiling grid, and movable wooden partitions. The core has bush-hammered concrete walls, which slant outward, partially overhanging a wide hallway with black-slate tiles. Glass panels separate the overhanging walls from the ceiling and provide indirect natural light to the sanctuary.

The hallway functions like the ambulatory in a traditional church. It connects offices and classrooms along the basement's perimeter, which are decorated with dark-stained plywood and mahogany woodwork. These rooms originally included a library, secretary's office, minister's office, and daycare. They retain some of their original decorations, such as shelves. The outer wall of each room is part of the building's curtain wall, which ascends to the plaster ceiling. Concrete partitions between each room rise to the height of the curtain wall's transoms, 8 feet 4.5 inches (2.553 m) above the floor, where plywood beams support dropped plywood ceilings above each room. The partitions are placed on a grid of 4-foot-wide (1.2 m) bays, corresponding to the facade's bays; the partitions abutting the hallways contain cylindrical lamps and hollow-core doors. The basement also includes a mechanical room below the western entrance and a kitchen below the eastern entrance.

The chapel, also known as the baptistery, is at the basement's western end. It was intentionally separated from the main sanctuary to signify that only those who were baptized could attend communion upstairs. The chapel is bounded on two sides by walls running along the building's diagonal axes. The western wall has wooden louvers, and double doors at its north and south ends that lead to the hallway. Movable wood partitions separate the chapel from the rest of the basement. The chapel has four rows of wooden pews, which face inward toward the core. The center of the room includes an elongated hexagonal baptismal font with white tiles; when the font is not being used for baptisms, it can be covered with a stainless steel platform. The pool has a sunburst design symbolizing the Holy Trinity. The ceiling above the font is part of the concrete core's slanted walls and is decorated with a dove, symbolizing the Holy Spirit. East of the font, a stainless-steel screen conceals a foyer, which leads to dressing rooms within the core. The foyer's rear wall, on the east, has mosaic tiles and a silver cross illuminated by accent lighting.

==== Sanctuary ====
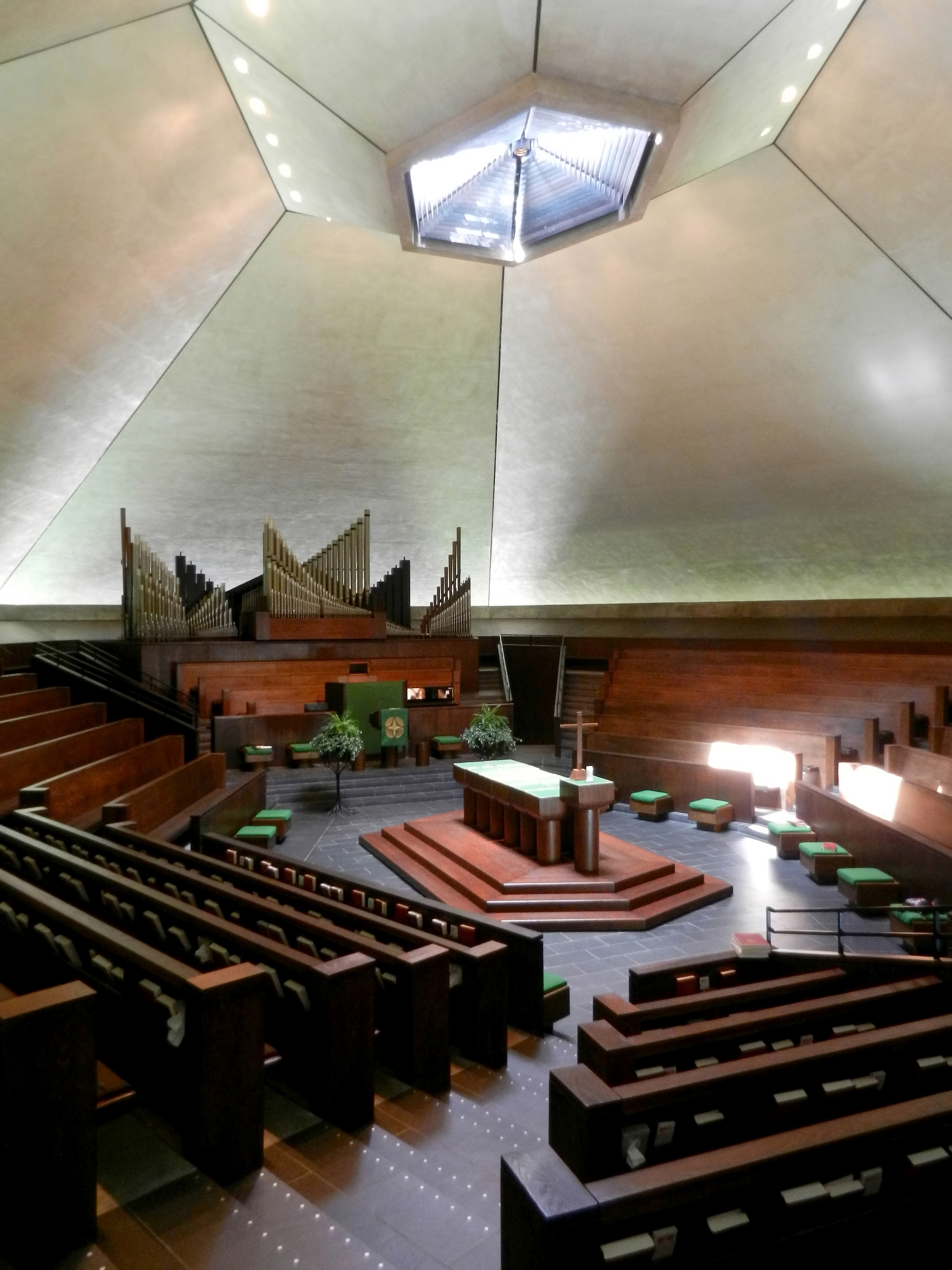
Interior of the sanctuary, looking from the upper pews toward the communion table (center) and choir loft (left background)

The sanctuary or nave is an elongated-hexagonal room occupying the entire upper level. It can seat 445 or 470 people, (Note: One source gives a significantly different figure of 615 seats.) and there are overflow seating areas with at least 100 more seats. The pews are arranged in a theater-in-the-round format, with sloped seating descending toward a central communion table on five sides. This creates a configuration that has been likened to an amphitheater, a bowl, or a chalice. The Republic wrote that the shape was intended to symbolize the congregation being "seated in the hands of God". The pews are made of dark-stained hardwood with brown upholstery. The floors are generally made of black slate, but the uppermost pew has carpeted floors. The seats are arranged so that no pew is more than 53 feet (16 m) away from the communion table. The layout allowed everyone to see the communion table and also face each other, in contrast to other churches where everyone faced the same direction.

Stairs from the narthex bisect the pews on the eastern side of the sanctuary, leading to the communion table. A second stairway to the north, and a wheelchair lift to the south (which replaced another staircase), lead from the narthex to the upper rows of pews. Stairways between the pews lead down to the communion table. The communion table's central location reflects the communion's key role in the Disciples of Christ, the denomination to which the church's congregation belonged. The communion table, consisting of twelve pedestals symbolizing the twelve disciples, is placed on a tiered platform. The pedestals, connected by small silver crosses, are arranged in two rows and face a larger, higher pedestal representing Christ. The communion table's hexagonal wooden platform could be moved when it was not needed; in particular, it could be rotated perpendicularly to host performances or other events.

The pulpit, choir loft, and a Holtkamp organ are situated in a chancel opposite the main entrance stairway, occupying the western side of the sanctuary. Small chairs for church elders are upholstered in one of four colors. The organ is the last of its kind designed by Walter Holtkamp Sr. Dating from the building's opening in 1964, it has three manuals, with either 2,340 or 2,432 pipes. Saarinen had intended for the varying lengths of the organ's pipes to serve as decorations in themselves. The western wall behind the chancel has a gate, reminiscent of an open tomb. Known as the "gate of resurrection", it conceals an opening that leads to the chapel in the basement.

The sanctuary's plaster ceiling, a continuation of the roof soffit and basement ceiling, forms the underside of the roof. The ceiling panels surround a hexagon above the communion table. Within this hexagon, trapezoidal panels with embedded recessed lights slope down toward the roof's hexagonal oculus opening, which lets natural light into the sanctuary. At the perimeter of the room, additional illumination is provided by indirect cove lighting, along with the glass panels from the basement. The glass panels, which let in natural light from the basement's curtain wall, are concealed, creating the impression that the light was coming from a mysterious source. The lighting design and general lack of windows, inspired by Saarinen's earlier Kresge Chapel, were variously described as giving the sanctuary a cavern-like feeling, or a sense of "peace and spiritual uplift". The shape of the sanctuary made its acoustics ideal for concerts; Indianapolis Symphony Orchestra director John Nelson preferred performing at the North Christian Church over anywhere else in Indiana.

== History ==
=== Background ===
The North Christian Church congregation, affiliated with the Protestant denomination Disciples of Christ, was founded by 43 former members of the First Christian Church in downtown Columbus, Indiana. The congregants had left the First Christian Church due to ideological disagreements, particularly because the older church did not allow women in leadership positions. The growth of the city's population was also cited as a reason for the new congregation's founding. The North Christian Church hosted its first meeting in a house on April 24, 1955. (Note: Some sources date the congregation's formation to September 28, 1955, or to October 1955.) Initially, congregants met at private houses and an Episcopal church. The congregation acquired a temporary site that October—the George Caldwell Mansion on 25th Street—and relocated there in February 1956 following a renovation. That April, the congregation began constructing a prefabricated sanctuary next to the mansion, which opened the next month. James L. Stoner began serving the congregation that May, becoming its first full-time pastor.

By mid-1956, the congregation had 122 members. In keeping with the North Christian Church's nature as a "family church", members of the congregation did not want to expand past 700 members. The congregation acquired land with the help of the industrialist J. Irwin Miller, one of its earliest members. Miller was the longtime leader of the Cummins automotive-parts company and a Sunday-school teacher at the church. In early 1958, the Columbus city government proposed annexing a site east of Sycamore Street and south of U.S. Route 31, just outside city limits; at the time, the congregation was considering acquiring this plot. Early that March, the congregation announced that it would buy the tract, covering about 5.5 acres (2.2 ha). This purchase was finalized on March 18, and the city government agreed to annex that land three days later. The original plot of land extended only as far east as California Street, roughly two blocks or 960 feet (290 m) east of Sycamore Street. Congregants planned to develop a new building on their newly acquired land.

=== Development ===
Preliminary sketch

Final design

The congregation began raising funds for the new building in October 1958; the initial fundraising dinner raised $313,000 for the project. To design the building, Miller had wanted to hire Eero Saarinen, whom he had met in 1939 when Eero's father Eliel Saarinen was designing the First Christian Church. Eero Saarinen was Miller's favorite architect, and Saarinen likewise regarded Miller as "the perfect client", ultimately designing four buildings for him. Miller delegated the architect-selection process to the congregation's building committee, of which he was named a chairman. The committee interviewed numerous architects from across the U.S. (Note: According to Pelkonen & Albrecht 2006, p. 64, these included Eduardo Catalano, Edward Durell Stone, Harry Weese, John Carl Warnecke, Minoru Yamasaki, Paul Rudolph, and Walter Netsch.) They interviewed Saarinen in January 1959, where, in response to a question about how long a church should last, the architect declared the building should stand for a long time. (Note: Sources disagree on whether he said the church should last "for generations" or "forever".) Miller later reflected that most of the architects interviewed by the committee had presented slideshows of their work, but that Saarinen's approach was different:

Eero just brought a notebook. He looked at us and said, "What do you want? What do you want it to be? Don't tell me what you want it to look like, but what you want it to be like." They decided to hire him as soon as he left.

==== Design ====
Saarinen's firm received the design contract in February, the month after his interview. It took two years to design the building, which Saarinen designed almost simultaneously with the Dulles International Airport Main Terminal. The congregation wanted all the rooms under one roof and an intimate sanctuary centered around a communion table. As such, Saarinen researched the early history of churches and the customs of the Disciples of Christ, and he studied scripture for two years. Rather than unilaterally deciding how the building should be laid out, he visited congregants to solicit their feedback for the design. Stoner's wife later reflected that Saarinen saw the building as an opportunity to create a "prototype of twentieth-century Christianity". Based on congregants' requests, Saarinen devised plans for a building with classrooms; meeting spaces for young congregants and the choir; a nursery; and a kitchen.

Saarinen focused extensively on even the most minor details of the design. One of his biographers, Jayne Merkel, wrote that he had created hundreds of drawings, whereas his father's final design for the First Christian Church had resembled the original drawings. The congregation had agreed on preliminary designs for the church building by December 1960. The plans called for a double-height hexagonal building topped by a spire, with a sanctuary, chapel, auditorium, classrooms, and offices inside. All of these spaces were packed inside the hexagonal massing, eliminating the need for protruding wings. At the time, the congregation had grown to 348 members, nearly half the congregation's 700-member goal. Saarinen continued to revise the plans after the congregation had already approved a scale model of the building, and the congregation gradually became impatient at the delays. In response to a query from Miller, Saarinen wrote that he was focusing on the small details because he felt an obligation to the congregation to perfect the design.

Walter Holtkamp was hired to design the church's organ in May 1961. When the plans were finalized on July 28, 1961, Saarinen wrote, "We have finally solved the Columbus church." Saarinen died in September 1961, and his associate Kevin Roche took over the project. Roche presented revised plans to the congregation that October, which called for a structure with a 470-seat sanctuary, classrooms, a chapel, an auditorium, kitchen, and other multi-use areas. Roche, John Dinkeloo, and other associates began creating working drawings in December, and the building committee hired a structural designer and mechanical engineering contractor. In February 1962, Miller indicated that construction drawings would be completed within two months and that the contracts would be awarded shortly thereafter. Holtkamp submitted his designs for the organ the next month.

==== Construction and opening ====
The congregation requested permission to rezone the new building's site for commercial use in August 1962, and the Columbus Plan Commission narrowly approved the request shortly thereafter. Concurrently, Repp and Mundt were hired as the building's general contractors. The groundbreaking ceremony for the building took place on September 2, 1962, exactly one year and one day after Saarinen had died. That November, the Columbus city government approved a construction permit for the new church, and Girard was hired to design objects for the new church. Work proceeded quickly, and by March 1963, the last steel beam of the superstructure had been installed. Dinkeloo and Paul A. Kennon presented drawings for the furnishings to the congregation's construction committee that month. That May, the building's iron workers went on strike for one day.

The building's spire was constructed in three 44-foot-long (13 m) sections and hoisted into place in mid-May 1963. Workers had to use a 60-short-ton (54-long-ton; 54 t) crane with a 200-foot-long (61 m) arm, one of the largest in Indiana, to construct the spire. A special service was hosted on May 21, 1963, when the cross on the topmost section of the spire was installed. Workers were fitting out the interior by that October, but although the building was supposed to be completed by Christmas, construction delays postponed its completion. The building was estimated to have cost $1 million or $1.3 million.

The North Christian Church building hosted its first service on March 8, 1964. Six members of the congregation had spent several hours preparing the building, which was still incomplete until an hour before the first service started. Around the time the building was completed, the congregation bought another plot east of their original site at Sycamore Street. The building was formally dedicated on April 19, 1964, with a service attended by 500 guests. For the dedication ceremony, Episcopal bishop Henry Knox Sherrill was invited to give a speech, and Eero Saarinen's mother Loja and Alexander Girard's wife Susan visited the new building. The old building was converted into a bank shortly thereafter.

=== Congregational use ===
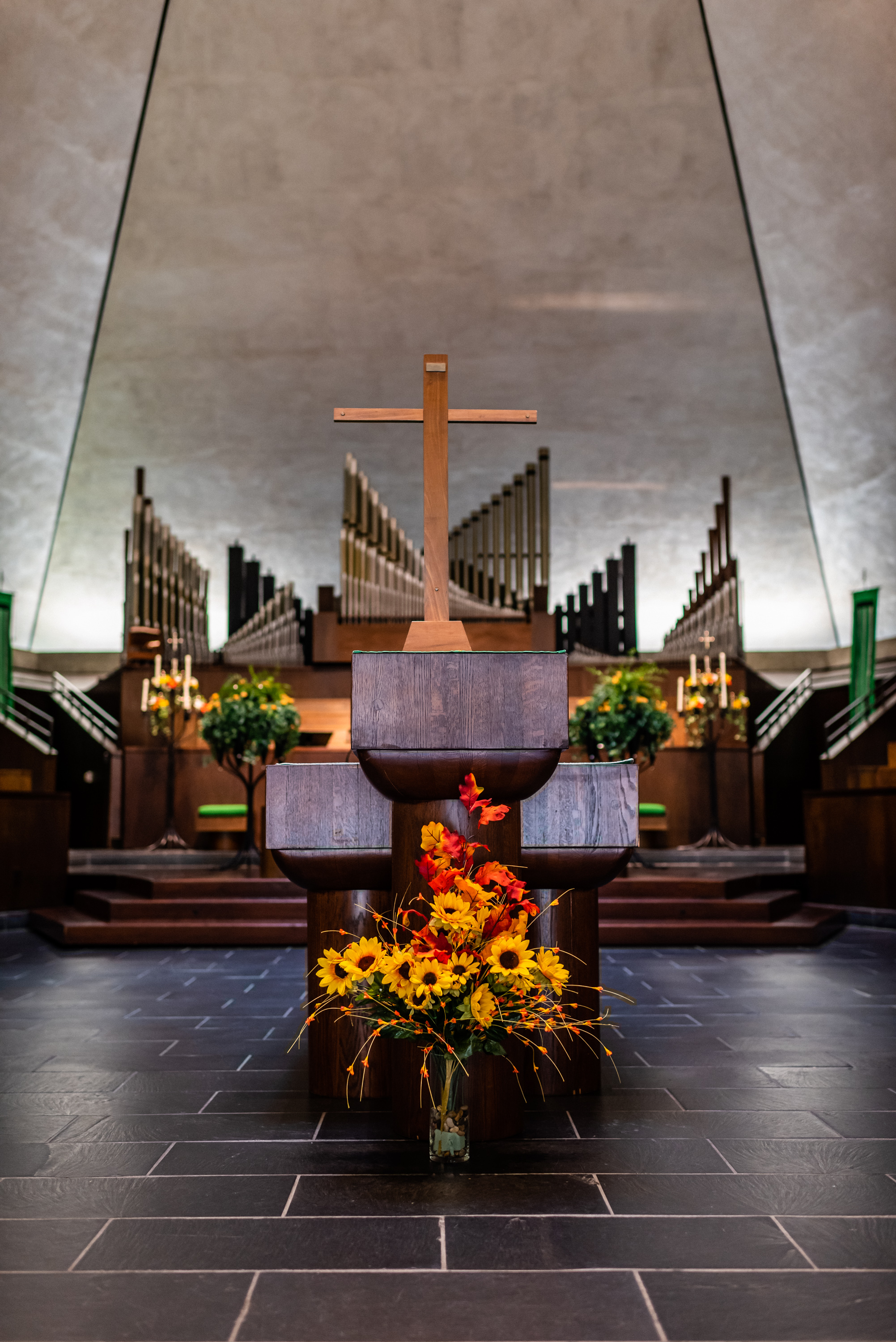
The west wall of the sanctuary, with pulpit and organ

When the North Christian Church was used as a church, congregants were baptized in the basement and then went upstairs to take private communion, passing through steps and a "gate of resurrection". After taking private communion, they could worship in the upstairs sanctuary. Early on in the building's history, the congregation established a trust fund to pay for repairs, allocating $150,000 a year for the purpose by 2018. In addition to worship services and religious events, the building was used by community organizations, including the boy and girl scouts and musical ensembles. The Columbus Visitors Center conducted daily tours of the building. For much of the late 20th century, the congregation was dominated by employees of Irwin Miller's company, Cummins, leading it to be called the "Cummins Church".

==== 1960s to 1980s ====
Shortly after the building opened, it was used for events such as youth group meetings, displays of nativity scenes, film screenings, and lecture series. Stoner resigned as the congregation's pastor in July 1966 and subsequently was hired by the National Council of Churches. During his tenure, Stoner had increased the North Christian Church congregation's annual budget from $20,000 to $140,000. Following Stoner's resignation, Joseph Warner Muir became the temporary pastor until the congregation found a minister to permanently assume the position. John R. Bean was installed as the congregation's pastor in April 1967. The organ was vandalized that October, and U.S. First Lady Lady Bird Johnson visited the church building that year during a tour of Columbus.

Under Bean's leadership, the North Christian Church hosted various special-interest groups and sponsored events such as picnics, festivals, and camping trips. By the early 1970s, congregants voluntarily gave visitors tours of the building, and the Chicago Tribune described it as possibly Columbus's most-visited structure. The congregation also hosted events such as music performances, ballet performances, and Christmas parties, and it raised money for an emergency-aid fund. As part of an extension of Tipton Lane eastward to Home Avenue, the site was expanded further in 1971. This added about 20 acres (8.1 ha) to the congregation's holdings. Kiley was hired to modify the landscape design to cover the newly acquired site. The Columbus city government reviewed a preliminary plat, or site map, in March 1972, and the plat was approved the next month. As part of the development of a nearby housing estate, the congregation also paid some of the cost of improving the adjacent segment of Sycamore Street. Kiley finalized his design for the landscape in 1974. Kiley had wanted to remove a magnolia orchard from the grounds after finding that it was not growing well, but the congregation convinced him to retain it.

The congregation's wide-ranging music program consisted of annual recitals and periodic performances at the church building. The congregation hosted a mortgage-burning ceremony in January 1979 to celebrate paying off its mortgage. Recital programs continued through the 1980s, including a special performance in 1984 to mark the 20th anniversary of the church organ's dedication. The congregation began raising funds for capital repairs to the church building, including its ceiling, roof, and oculus in 1983. The building continued to receive tourists in the 1980s; one tour guide said the North Christian Church was the best-known building on tours of the city's architecture. The congregation celebrated its 30th anniversary in 1986, inviting all 3,000 people who had ever been part of the congregation. In 1988, the Storrow Kinsella Partnership was hired to create plans to repair the structural frame and roof.

==== 1990s to early 2010s ====
The North Christian Church's congregation began hosting some joint worship services with the St. Paul's Episcopal Church in 1991. The church building also hosted Alcoholics Anonymous meetings, and the congregation sometimes held services incorporating these meetings. At the end of 1991, Bean retired as the congregation's pastor, having served in the role for 25 years. He was replaced in late 1993 by former Lexington Theological Seminary president William O. Paulsell. During the decade, the Columbus Visitors Center organized tours of the North Christian Church and other modernist churches in Columbus, and the building also hosted youth meetings. In addition, the congregation offered their building to other groups and congregations that needed it, such as the St. Bartholomew Catholic Church's congregation, which worshiped there while their own building was under construction. The North Christian Church's congregation remained involved in community issues, operating a food bank and hosting various speeches in the church building.

The congregation hired a local architect, Todd Williams, to design a memorial garden outside the church building in 1995. The garden was dedicated two years later on September 21, 1997. Paulsell retired that month, having led the congregation for four years, and David Shirey took over as the congregation's fourth pastor in September 1998. His three-year tenure at North Christian Church was marked by declines in membership, caused by strife between newer and older members. Irwin Miller and his wife Xenia, who had been major benefactors to the congregation throughout its history, simultaneously scaled back their involvement due to growing health issues. Shirey severed his affiliation with the congregation in 2001, resigning to help found a church in Arizona. Greg Russell served as the senior pastor for some time in the early 2000s. Workers began repairing a defect on the spire in 2002, and the spire's metal was replaced the next year.

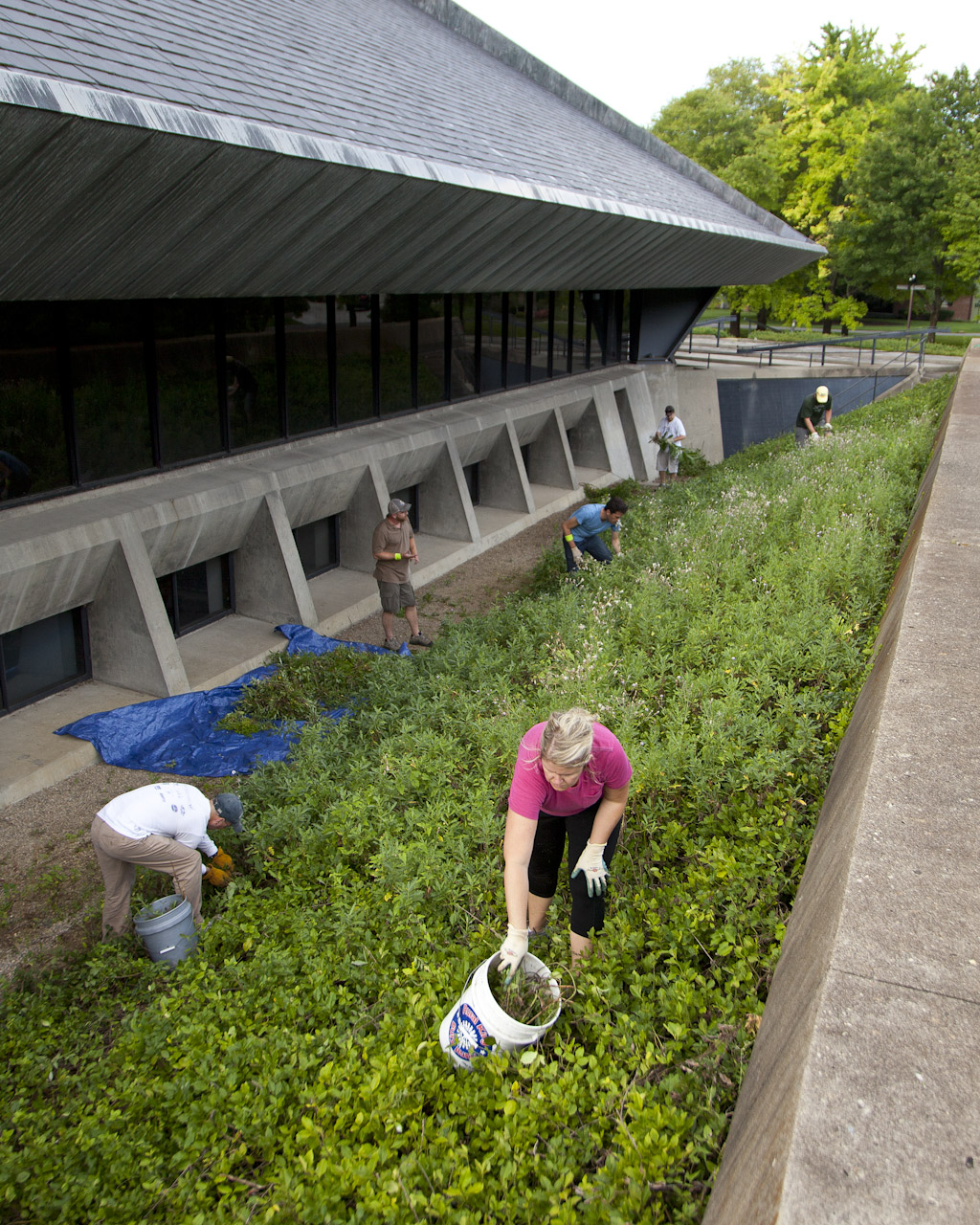
The moat being restored in 2015

Lanny Lawler became the senior minister in 2004. Under Lawler's leadership, the congregation hosted events such as Taizé worship sessions and public "labyrinth walks" at the building. By the mid-2000s, the church building's roof was deteriorating, and the congregation was raising money for roof repairs, lighting on the spire, a welcome center, and a repaved parking lot. To pay for a $650,000 renovation of the roof, the congregation obtained a $300,000 grant in 2007 through the Save America's Treasures program. The roof and memorial garden were repaired over the following two years as part of a project designed by Louis Joyner. The congregation began catering more openly to social-justice causes in 2011, though some congregants left as a result. Members of the congregation also asked guests to point out issues with the building, which had begun to develop leaks and ventilation problems. The grounds were restored following a storm in 2015. The next year, as part of a program to mitigate issues associated with a widening of the nearby U.S. 31, the Indiana Department of Transportation replaced diseased and dead plants on the grounds.

==== Maintenance issues and closure ====
The church's final years were marked by steadily declining attendance. As upkeep costs increased, the remaining members found it increasingly difficult to pay for maintenance. By the late 2010s, the congregation had only 35 or 60 remaining members, few of them young. A major issue was repairing the building's original, custom-built air-conditioning system, which stopped working in 2017 and cost $500,000 just to rebuild. Without other methods of ventilation such as windows, temperatures reached 90 °F (32 °C) during the summer, causing the organ to malfunction and driving away groups that would otherwise have met there. The congregation also had difficulty attracting new members or raising $250,000 to receive a matching funds grant of the same amount. The congregation received funding from Sacred Places Indiana in 2016. The funding included planning grants for a study about the building's future, but the congregation could not complete the study. The grants would have allowed the congregation to obtain up to $250,000 in matching funds grants for repairs.

Tonja Gerardy became the senior pastor in 2018 and continued to advocate for social justice causes, such as the LGBTQ and women's rights movements. In April 2018, the historic-preservation organization Indiana Landmarks added the church building to its list of Indiana's 10 most endangered landmarks. Although the building was not badly deteriorated or neglected, unlike other landmarks on the list, the congregation was experiencing maintenance difficulties, despite their best efforts. The Getty Foundation distributed a preservation grant to the North Christian Church in 2019 as part of the foundation's Keeping It Modern program. The $150,000 grant was used to hire preservation consultants; at the time, the air-conditioning system had just been replaced, but other parts of the building had to be repaired. The local preservation organization Landmark Columbus and other groups developed a conservation management plan for the church building's long-term upkeep.

The COVID-19 pandemic in Indiana caused a further exodus of worshipers, and the congregation had fewer than 30 people by early 2022. The Bartholomew County Public Library (BCPL) began considering the feasibility of converting the structure into a library branch without removing or significantly modifying the original decorations. At the time, the BCPL's existing branches were overcrowded, and there was demand for a new library branch in the area. On July 16, 2022, the congregation held a "Celebration of Life" service for the building and officially disbanded. The building was closed after the congregation disbanded, and former congregation members retained ownership of the cross on the spire. Subsequently, ownership of the building was transferred to Columbus Capital, which temporarily acted as the building's caretaker. The new owners planned an educational museum at the building and requested a tax exemption for the purpose. In mid-2023, the former congregation's members offered the building to the BCPL.

=== Conversion to library ===
On April 15, 2024, the BCPL's board voted to accept the church building as a gift from the former North Christian Church congregation to house a new library branch. The renovation and acquisition of the old church building were estimated to be less expensive than a completely new library structure. As part of its takeover, the BCPL would renovate the building and make it wheelchair-accessible, although such a renovation would take up to five years. The BCPL and the Disciples of Christ agreed to preserve the congregation's artifacts. Part of the repair cost would be funded by $800,000 from an insurance policy that the congregation had placed on the building. After taking over the building, the BCPL announced that it would begin using the former church for events in the middle of that year. The initial events included the BCPL's Summer Reading Kickoff in early 2024 and a rock concert in February 2025.

To permit the building's change of use, the BCPL submitted a site development plan to the Columbus Plan Commission, which approved the plan in June 2024. The cross was removed from the building's spire in August 2024 and relocated to the First Christian Church of Bedford's Camp Bedford. The spire was then covered with a protective lead-coated copper sheath. In October 2024, the BCPL began discussing new names for the former church. After months of deliberation, the Library Board renamed the structure "'The LEX: the Library of Experience" on April 8, 2025. The library planned to convert the sanctuary into a multi-purpose events space and devote the other rooms to a variety of community uses, including education. The structure was broken into and vandalized on April 14, 2025.

== Impact ==
=== Reception ===
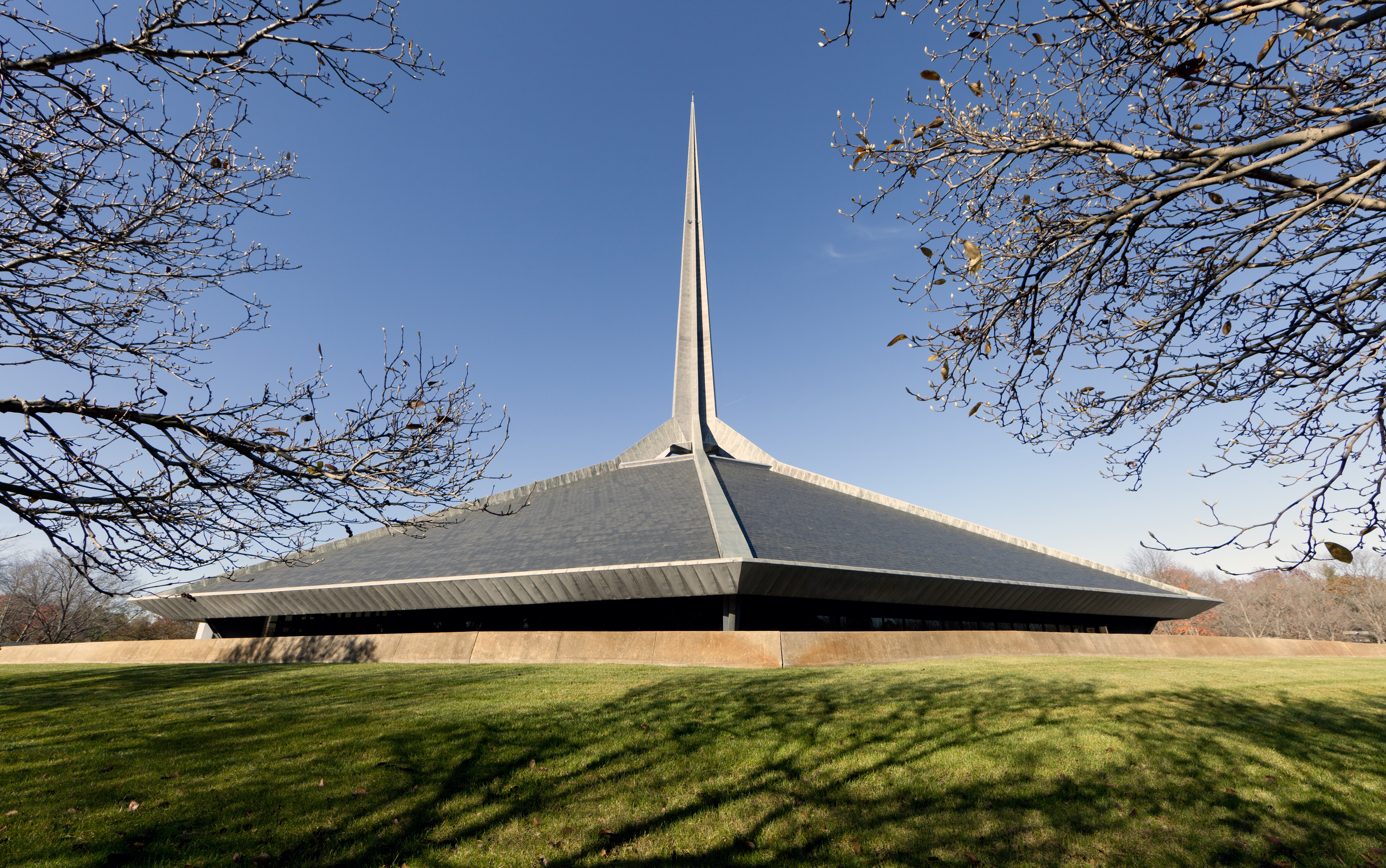
Side view of the building

When the church building was completed, it was a prominent community landmark. The design startled many observers, and the building was initially sometimes described as "the holy oil-can". Later observers continued to describe the building as a highly visible landmark of Columbus, particularly for people approaching the city from the north. An article for The Tennessean described the building as having a similar "magical" feeling to that of the Notre-Dame de Paris, while a Washington Post reporter compared the entrances to flying saucers and described the exterior as seemingly "poised to lift off and take man to meet his Maker". The church building also became a symbol of the city of Columbus. The Republic compared its symbolism to the Sydney Opera House as a symbol for Australia, or the Cinderella Castle as a symbol for Disney parks.

Wolf Von Eckardt praised the design's sculptural qualities in The New Republic, saying that Saarinen had succeeded in his goal of "prouder, more aggressive, much richer and larger" architecture. A writer for The Christian Science Monitor said in 1968 that, because of the berm, "its slender spire seems to soar from the surrounding corn field", while the Cleveland Press said the same year that the building's location near corn fields gave it "an Indiana quality". The New York Times wrote in 1970 that the North Christian Church was "perhaps the most striking and impressive example of contemporary architecture in Columbus" because of its spire and hexagonal footprint, and Paul Goldberger of the same newspaper saw the it as one of Saarinen's better designs. Paul Gapp of the Chicago Tribune said the building "proclaims itself with a dignity at once powerful but unpretentious", highlighting the spire and the sanctuary's theater-in-the-round seating.

Benjamin Forgey wrote for The Washington Post in 1986 that the building was a "dramatically thoughtful piece" both inside and outside, while Faith & Form wrote in 2000 that the North Christian Church had been "one of the most significant and inspiring forms in religious architecture at that time". In 2003, another New York Times reporter wrote that the North Christian Church was Columbus's "second indisputably great church", after the First Christian Church, and that its soaring massing attracted observers' attention, much like Saarinen's design for the Dulles International Airport Main Terminal did. Also in the 2000s, a writer for The Columbian said the building "conveys 'sacred space' as few other places can", and a writer for the Milwaukee Journal Sentinel said the interior and landscape complemented each other. The Guardian wrote in 2024 that the church "bears a similar level of structural ambition" to Saarinen's Gateway Arch and TWA Flight Center.

==== Comparisons to the First Christian Church ====
When the North Christian Church was complete, it was compared to the older First Christian Church, designed by Saarinen's father. Von Eckardt wrote that the churches were "two pinnacles in the uncertain architecture of our time" and that, despite their vastly different shapes, the churches were built in the same spirit. He later wrote that the building was "pure emotion" compared to the First Christian Church, whose geometric design had been "pure reason". The Wall Street Journal wrote in 1970 that the North Christian Church was just as "eye-catching" as the First Christian Church, though Goldberger said the older church had a more "convincing" design.

Blair Kamin of the Chicago Tribune said in 1993 that the North Christian Church was one of several churches that had followed the First Christian Church's lead. Church History magazine wrote that Saarinen's North Christian Church design had exhibited an "even more dramatic expression of a modernist approach to form" compared with his father's design.

=== Architectural influence and media ===
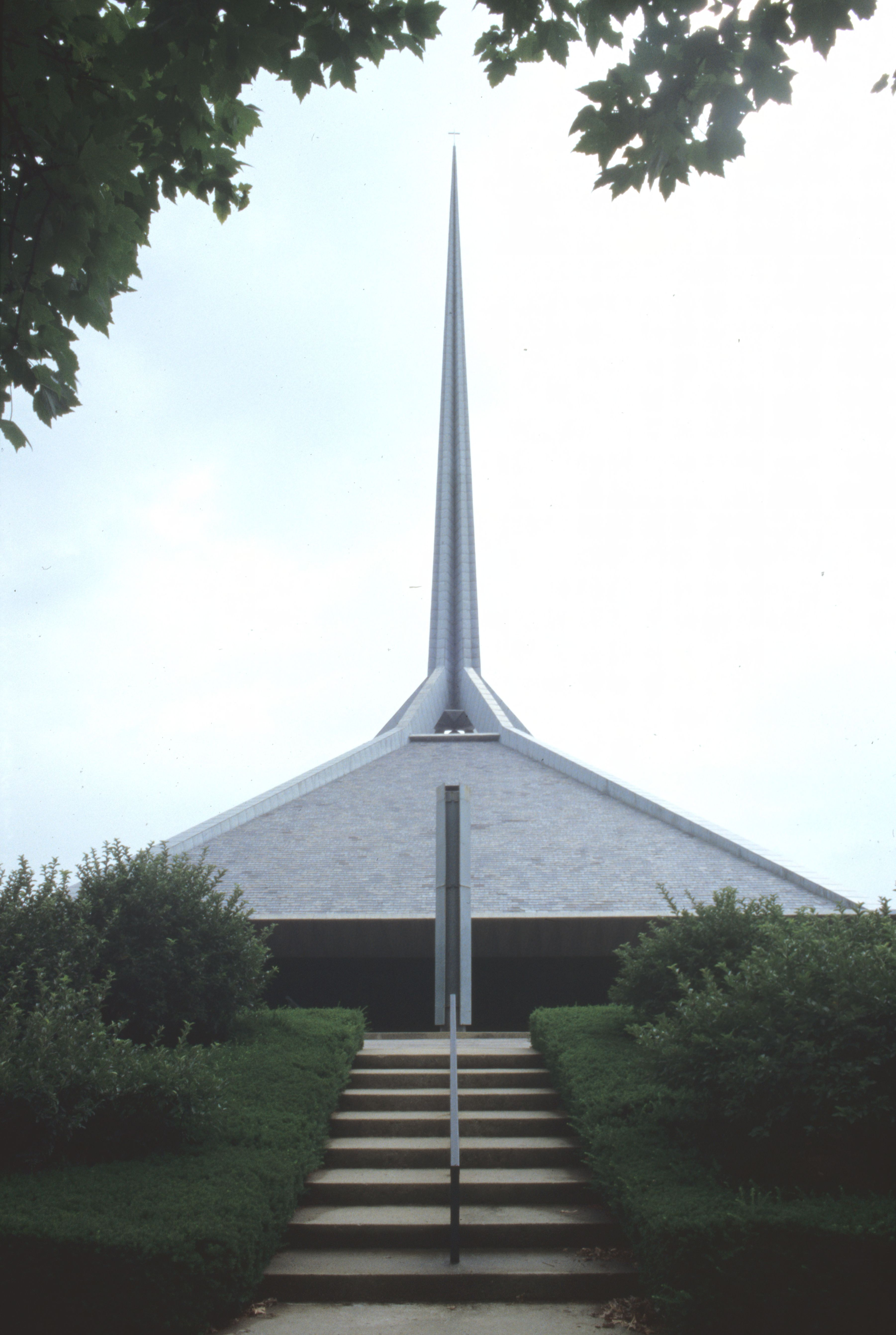
View from the western entrance

The structure has been described as Saarinen's final design or one of his last works. The Republic described it as the only church Saarinen had ever built, although the art collector Elsie Sweeney, whose sister had been on the building committee, told The Star Press that Saarinen had designed churches in Europe but not in the U.S. Saarinen considered the church building one of his favorite designs, quipping that it was the one work by which he hoped Saint Peter would judge his career. As he said, "When I face St. Peter I am able to say that out of the buildings I did during my lifetime, one of the best was this little church, because it has in it a real spirit that speaks forth to all Christians as a witness to their faith."

The North Christian Church's design did not generate much interest during Saarinen's life, or even when it was being constructed after his death. The years that followed produced copies of the building all across the United States, many of which were of inferior quality; by the early 1980s, The Christian Science Monitor called the design a "cliched pyramid". Among the buildings inspired by the North Christian Church building's design was the St. Peter's Lutheran Church in Columbus, designed by Gunnar Birkerts and constructed in 1988.

A writer for Christianity Today said in 1981 that the North Christian Church was one of several 20th-century churches that used innovative "methods and materials" to express the purity of their design. The Architectural Review of Britain described Saarinen's buildings for Miller as an "important legacy from Saarinen for the environment". The high concentration of modern buildings in Columbus, including the North Christian Church, helped make it one of the American Institute of Architects' top U.S. cities for innovation and design. The church building was featured in a 1990 exhibit about Saarinen's work at the Indianapolis Museum of Art's Columbus Gallery and a 2007 exhibition at the Cranbrook Art Museum. The building was also featured in Columbus, a 2017 film set in the city; its producer Kogonada cited the spire as having influenced his thinking on the role of architecture in the film.

=== Awards and landmark designation ===
The American Society of Landscape Architects' Indiana chapter gave the building an award for its landscaping in 1999. In addition, the American Institute of Architects selected the church building as one of the United States' 13 best buildings in the previous half-century in 2004.

In early 2000, the North Christian Church and five other modernist structures in Columbus were nominated for designation as National Historic Landmarks (NHLs), which would add them to the National Register of Historic Places (NRHP). The United States Department of the Interior designated four of these buildings, including the North Christian Church, as landmarks that May. This was the first time in U.S. history that several buildings were simultaneously designated as NHLs before turning 50 years old, the minimum age required for most buildings to be listed on the NRHP. The designation allowed the building to qualify for federal preservation funds. The landmark nominations themselves received national media attention, in part because very few NRHP sites were designated as NHLs, let alone multiple sites in such a small area. The landmark designation includes the church building's landscaping.

The North Christian Church is one of seven buildings in Columbus designated as NHLs. The others are The Republic Newspaper Office, the Mabel McDowell Adult Education Center, the Irwin Union Bank, the Miller House, the First Christian Church, and the First Baptist Church. Of these buildings, the North Christian Church is one of three designed by Saarinen, the others being the Irwin Union Bank and Miller House, all three of which were commissioned by J. Irwin Miller. The North Christian Church building is also one of several modernist public buildings that Miller commissioned in the town, and, along with a 1952 cottage in Canada, one of four buildings that Saarinen designed for Miller.

== See also ==
- List of works by Eero Saarinen
- List of National Historic Landmarks in Indiana
- National Register of Historic Places listings in Bartholomew County, Indiana
