= Columbus (2017 film) =

Film by Kogonada

- Theatrical release poster
- Directed by: Kogonada
- Written by: Kogonada
- Produced by: Andrew Miano; Aaron Boyd; Danielle Renfrew Behrens; Chris Weitz; Giulia Caruso; Ki Jin Kim
- Starring: John Cho; Haley Lu Richardson; Michelle Forbes; Rory Culkin; Parker Posey
- Cinematography: Elisha Christian
- Edited by: Kogonada
- Music by: Hammock
- Production companies: Superlative Films; Depth of Field; Nonetheless Productions
- Distributed by: Sundance Institute
- Release dates: January 22, 2017 (Sundance); August 4, 2017 (United States)
- Running time: 104 minutes
- Country: United States
- Language: English
- Budget: $700,000
- Box office: $1.1 million

Columbus is a 2017 American drama film written and directed by Kogonada. The film stars John Cho as the son of a renowned architecture scholar who gets stranded in Columbus, Indiana, and strikes up a friendship with a young architecture enthusiast (Haley Lu Richardson) who works at the local library. Michelle Forbes, Rory Culkin, and Parker Posey appear in supporting roles.

Columbus premiered at the 2017 Sundance Film Festival and was released in the United States on August 4, 2017, by the Sundance Institute, and received acclaim from critics.

== Plot ==
In Columbus, Indiana, Jin Lee arrives from South Korea to watch over his estranged father who, while visiting the town to give a lecture about architecture, has fallen into a coma and is now in a local hospital. One day, Jin meets Casey, a young woman who works in a library near the hospital. Casey lives with and takes care of her mother, a recovering drug addict.

Casey and Jin quickly build a rapport as she guides him around Columbus for several days. The two discuss the local architecture while simultaneously opening up about themselves to each other. Jin reveals his feelings of resentment toward his father, whom Jin believes to have cared more about work than for him. Casey also opens up about her dream of getting a job in architecture. However, she confesses that she cannot leave her mother in order to pursue it. Jin advises that it is her life and that Casey is holding herself back.

One night, Casey and Jin are wandering around Columbus when Casey discovers that her mother had been lying to her and has possibly relapsed, though later learns she has just been seeing a new partner. Following this incident, Casey comes to the conclusion that it is in her best interest to move on and decides to leave Columbus in order to pursue her dream. Jin and Casey share a tender hug goodbye and Casey leaves, while Jin stays behind to watch over his ailing father.

== Cast ==
- John Cho as Jin Lee, a Korean-American who works in South Korea translating literature to English
- Haley Lu Richardson as Casey, a recent high school graduate and library worker caring for her mother while dreaming of being an architect
- Parker Posey as Eleanor, Jae Yong Lee's longtime assistant for whom Jin has harbored feelings in the past
- Michelle Forbes as Maria, Casey's working-class mother, a recovering drug addict
- Rory Culkin as Gabriel, Casey's coworker and friend, a doctoral student
- Erin Allegretti as Emma, an acquaintance of Casey
- Shani Salyers Stiles as Vanessa, Maria's co-worker
- Joseph Anthony Foronda as Jae Yong Lee, Jin's father, an acclaimed architecture professor who falls into a coma

== Production ==
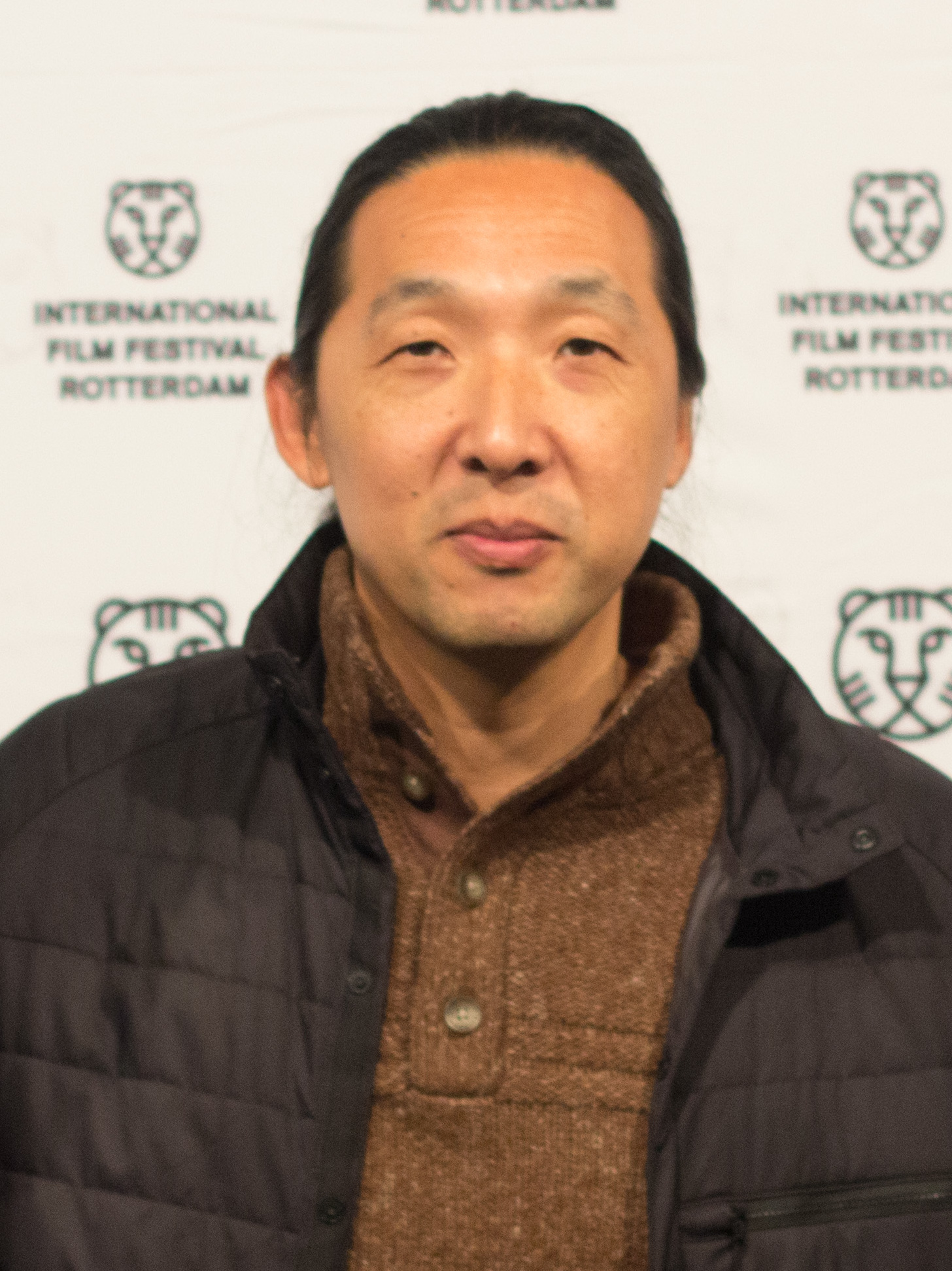
Writer, director, and editor Kogonada

The film was shot on location in Columbus, Indiana, over 18 days. The film began shooting on July 31, 2016, and concluded on August 20, 2016.

Kogonada was inspired by director Yasujirō Ozu, particularly his 1951 film Early Summer, incorporating elements of his style and shot selection into Columbus. He notes the similar use of negative space in Columbus, explaining that "architecture is the structuring of emptiness", which he compares to that of human emotion.

=== Architecture ===
Among the famous Modernist buildings that feature in the film are the First Christian Church by Eliel Saarinen; the Irwin Union Bank, Miller House, and North Christian Church by Eliel's son Eero Saarinen; and the Cleo Rogers Memorial Library by I. M. Pei.

Kogonada visited Columbus on holiday. Inspired by the city's architecture, he stated that he "deeply wanted it to be a part of the first film I made". He describes the buildings there as having "an extraordinary premise for drama" and that the architecture of which forms the common ground between Jin and Casey when they are first introduced.

== Soundtrack ==
Kogonada sought out Hammock to create the soundtrack for the film after reading an interview with the band, claiming "they were talking about the relationship between absence and presence in their music – which was a mind-blowing moment – and I thought, 'They have to be the music for this film.'"

== Release ==
Columbus premiered at the Sundance Film Festival on January 22, 2017. The film was released in select theaters in the United States on August 4, 2017, by the Sundance Institute. It was later released in the United Kingdom and Ireland on October 5, 2018.

It was screened at the 28th Busan International Film Festival as part of "Korean American Special Exhibition: Korean Diaspora" on October 5, 2023.

== Reception ==
=== Box office ===
Columbus had a domestic opening weekend gross of $28,800 from two theaters, one located in New York City and the other in Los Angeles, averaging $14,400 per theater. In its second weekend of release, Columbus grossed $44,460 from seven theaters, averaging $6,351 per theater. In its third weekend of release, Columbus grossed $44,450 from twelve theaters, averaging $3,705 per theater.

In Columbus, Indiana, the setting of the film, Columbus sold a record breaking 8,953 tickets over the course of a six-week local run playing at the "YES Cinema". The previous record holder was The King's Speech with 3,700 tickets sold over a nine-week run.

Internationally, the film grossed $75,970 following release; $13,824 gross total in Portugal; $6,671 gross total in the United Kingdom; $55,475 gross total in South Korea.

=== Critical response ===
On the review aggregator website Rotten Tomatoes, the film holds an approval rating of 96% based on 134 reviews, with an average rating of 8.2/10. The website's critics consensus reads, "Wonderfully acted and artfully composed, Columbus balances the clean lines of architecture against the messiness of love, with tenderly moving results." On Metacritic, the film has a weighted average score of 89 out of 100, based on reviews from 27 critics, indicating "universal acclaim".

Peter Travers of Rolling Stone wrote: "How do you make a ravishing romance about architecture? You'll find the answer with Kogonada, the video essayist and critic whose debut feature, Columbus, is a spellbinder." Wrapping up his review, Travers concluded that "Columbus is a whisper-soft debut from Kogonada that nonetheless results in something unique and unforgettable. It's pure cinema." In his review for The Hollywood Reporter, Boyd van Hoeij called the film a "quietly masterful feature debut" for Kogonada and wrote, "One of the film's chief pleasures is how it keeps the conversation between the various characters flowing while gently avoiding falling into any of the possible romantic-entanglement traps that viewers used to more conventional romantic works might be expecting. The fact it is accessible for people without any prior knowledge of either Modernism or architecture in general is another plus, though the film's clearly too thoughtful and quietly masterful to ever qualify as a real crowd-pleaser."

Many critics praised the leading pair of Cho and Richardson. Geoff Berkshire of Variety wrote: "Together they form an unexpected, but perfectly constructed, pair." A.A. Dowd said: "The two have a laid-back chemistry, an easy melancholy communion, that stops Columbus from ever feeling too academic. Come for the breathtaking architectural scenery, stay for the likable pair staring up at it." Kate Erbland from IndieWire stated that Cho and Richardson were "perfect" for their roles and went onto to write "The pair have prodigious chemistry, but the real pleasure of Columbus is watching that bond deepen, and the comfort that Casey and Jin ultimately find in each other."

Cho's performance was praised, and the recurring question from critics was why had Cho not yet become a leading man in Hollywood. Chris Nashawaty of Entertainment Weekly wrote that "Cho gives Jin a real warmth and empathy". A.A. Dowd from The A.V. Club said: "Cho, in a too-rare leading role, delivers the kind of sensitive performance that's always banged at the lid of his franchise work." Justin Chang of the Los Angeles Times wrote that Cho's performance contained "whip-smart charisma [that] has long warranted more leading roles like this one." Katie Walsh from The Providence Journal declared that Cho's performance was "fantastic" and described it as "subtle, specific and quietly stirring." Richardson's performance was also acclaimed. Brian Formo of Collider wrote, "Richardson puts the story on her shoulders and elevates the film into a beguiling, thin air. She lends the beautiful but empty buildings a beating heart." Oliver Jones of The New York Observer commended Richardson's "naturalism". Berkshire said of Richardson's performance "relative newcomer proving her ability of holding the screen with maximum soulfulness in a minimalist drama." Tara Brady of The Irish Times wrote of Richardson's performance "the blazing Haley Lu Richardson, wrings everything from her best-written role since The Edge of Seventeen."

Ben Nicholson of Sight and Sound considered the auteurist tendencies of the director, Kogonada, which are demonstrated in the film: "It is perhaps unsurprising to those familiar with Kogonada's acclaimed video-essay work, which often observes the subtle details and recurring motifs of auteurist vision, that his feature debut would be equally meticulous." Sheila O'Malley wrote: "What Kogonada has done with Columbus (along with cinematographer Elisha Christian) is to blend the background into the foreground and vice versa, so that you see things through the eyes of the two architecture-obsessed main characters. Watching the film is almost like feeling the muscles in your eyes shift, as you look up from reading a book to stare out at the ocean. From the very first shot, it's clear that the buildings will be essential. They are a part of the lives unfolding in their shadows. Sometimes it almost seems like they are listening. There is a story in Columbus. What is remarkable is how intense it is, given the stillness and quiet of Kogonada's style, and the focus with which he films the buildings."

=== Accolades ===
Award	Date of ceremony	Category	Recipients	Result	Ref.
Gotham Independent Film Awards	November 27, 2017	Best Actress	Haley Lu Richardson	Nominated	
Gotham Independent Film Awards	November 27, 2017	Bingham Ray Breakthrough Director Award	Kogonada	Nominated	
Gotham Independent Film Awards	November 27, 2017	Best Screenplay	Kogonada	Nominated	
Golden Tomato Awards	January 3, 2018	Best Drama Movie 2017	Columbus	5th Place	
Independent Spirit Awards	March 3, 2018	Best First Feature	Columbus	Nominated	
Independent Spirit Awards	March 3, 2018	Best First Screenplay	Kogonada	Nominated	
Independent Spirit Awards	March 3, 2018	Best Cinematography	Elisha Christian	Nominated	
Independent Spirit Awards	March 3, 2018	Piaget Producers Award	Giulia Caruso and Ki Jin Kim	Nominated	

=== Top Ten lists ===
Columbus was listed as one of the best films of the year by several critics. This is a sampling.

- 1st – B.J. Bethel, RogerEbert.com
- 2nd – Sam Mauro, Silver Screen Beat
- 3rd – Rob Hunter, Film School Rejects
- 4th – Seongyong Cho, RogerEbert.com
- 4th – Walker King, RogerEbert.com
- 4th – Matt Patches, Thrillist
- 5th – Nick Schager, Esquire
- 5th – Chris Cabin, Collider
- 6th – David Ehrlich, IndieWire
- 6th – Bob Strauss, Los Angeles Daily News
- 6th – Justin Chang, Los Angeles Times
- 6th – Alan Zilberman, RogerEbert.com
- 6th – Micah Mertes, Omaha World-Herald
- 7th – Josh Bell, Las Vegas Weekly
- 8th – Brian Tallerico, RogerEbert.com
- 8th – William Bibbiani, CraveOnline
- 9th – Ben Kenigsberg, RogerEbert.com
- 9th – Alissa Wilkinson, Vox
- 9th – Kevin Richie, Now
- 10th – K. Austin Collins, The Ringer
- 10th – Joshua Rothkopf, Time Out New York

== Additional sources ==
- Fuselier, Jess (March 14, 2018). "Distribution Case Study: Columbus". Sundance Institute.
