= American Airlines Flight 320 =

1959 aviation accident

Coordinates: 40.794°N 73.862°W

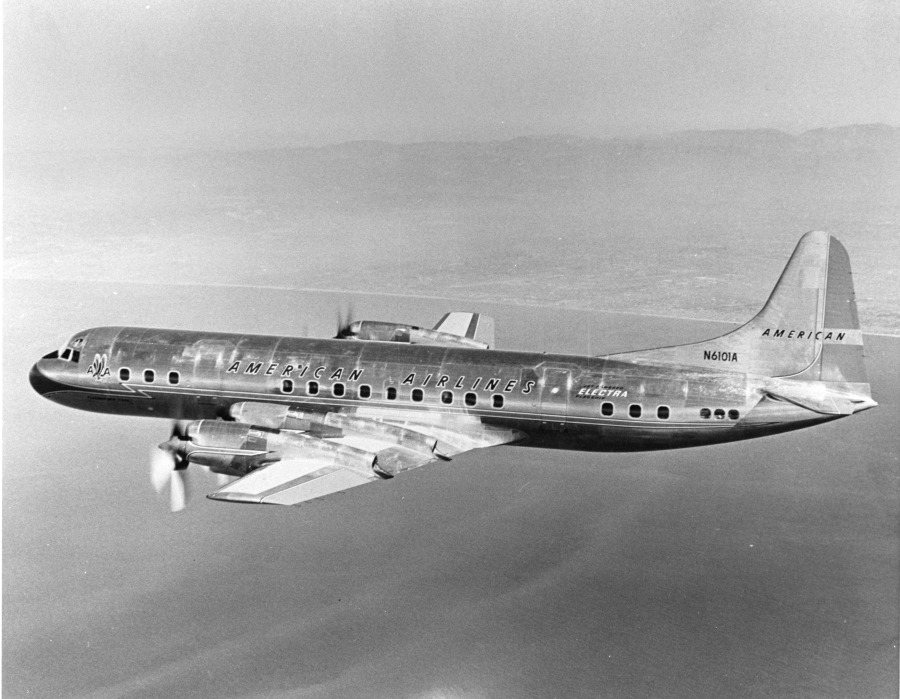
- The aircraft involved, taken before the accident

Accident
- Date: February 3, 1959
- Summary: Controlled flight into terrain
- Site: New York City, US

Aircraft
- Aircraft type: Lockheed L-188A Electra
- Aircraft name: Flagship New York
- Operator: American Airlines
- IATA flight No.: AA320
- ICAO flight No.: AAL320
- Call sign: AMERICAN 320
- Registration: N6101A
- Flight origin: Midway Airport, Chicago
- Destination: LaGuardia Airport, New York
- Passengers: 68
- Crew: 5
- Fatalities: 65
- Injuries: 8
- Survivors: 8

American Airlines Flight 320 was a scheduled flight between Chicago Midway Airport and New York City's LaGuardia Airport. On February 3, 1959, (Note: This was one of three notable aviation incidents to occur on this date; the other two were the crash of a Beechcraft Bonanza in Clear Lake, Iowa (carrying musicians Buddy Holly, Ritchie Valens, and "The Big Bopper" J. P. Richardson) and the near crash of Pan Am Flight 115 near Newfoundland. Flight 320 knocked these other incidents down the headlines.) the Lockheed L-188 Electra performing the flight crashed into the East River during its approach to LaGuardia Airport, killing 65 of the 73 people on board. Weather conditions in the area were poor, and as it descended, the aircraft passed through dense clouds and fog. As it approached the runway, it flew lower than the intended path and crashed into the icy river 4,900 feet (1,500 m) short of the runway. At the time of the crash, American Airlines had been operating the newly introduced Lockheed Electra in commercial service for only about two weeks, and the accident was the first involving the aircraft type.

After the crash, surviving flight crew members said they had been monitoring the aircraft's instruments, and right up to the moment of impact, the altimeter had been showing that they were flying a safe height above the water. However, eyewitnesses on the ground said that the aircraft seemed to be flying much lower than other planes normally flew during approaches. The Civil Aeronautics Board concluded that the crew made several mistakes that caused the crash. It identified the crew's inexperience flying the Lockheed Electra and the poor weather conditions as contributing factors. The Air Line Pilots Association disputed that finding, and said the accident was caused by faulty aircraft instruments and poor weather conditions, not by any mistakes made by the highly experienced flight crew. The accident led to proposals for new regulations requiring flight recorders on large passenger aircraft and to new construction at LaGuardia Airport to extend the runways, to improve the approach lighting systems, and to add an instrument landing system to the runway Flight 320 had been approaching.

== Background ==
Flight 320 was a regularly scheduled American Airlines flight between Chicago and New York City, using one of the airline's newly acquired Lockheed L-188 Electra turboprop aircraft. American had first started flying the Electra in commercial service less than two weeks earlier, and was operating six daily round-trip flights on its route between the two cities. The airline planned to assign Electras to additional routes as soon as Lockheed could complete further aircraft deliveries. The new planes, which carried seventy passengers, flew faster than the Douglas DC-7 aircraft American had been using on medium-distance routes and shortened the scheduled flying time between Chicago and New York by about half an hour.

On the evening of February 3, 1959, Flight 320 was scheduled to depart Chicago's Midway Airport at 9:00 p.m. EST, but wind-driven snow delayed its departure. The aircraft took off fifty-four minutes behind schedule and was one of the last flights to depart before the airport closed because of the storm. It carried sixty-eight passengers and five crew members, and the trip was expected to take one hour and forty-two minutes. The flight proceeded uneventfully toward the New York City area, cruising at 21,000 feet (6,400 m).

== Accident ==
At 11:34 p.m., Flight 320 approached the New York City area. The LaGuardia Airport approach controller advised the pilots that conditions at the airport included overcast skies, a ceiling of 400 feet (120 m), and visibility of 1.25 miles (2,010 m). The controller instructed the pilots to fly north of the airport, and to prepare for a direct approach to runway 22 over the East River. At 11:55 p.m., with the aircraft 2.8 miles (4.5 km) from the airport, LaGuardia tower controllers cleared Flight 320 to land on runway 22. The crew acknowledged the clearance with a simple acknowledgement of "320", and there were no further radio communications. Moments later, while traveling at 140 knots (160 mph; 260 km/h), the aircraft struck the East River about 4,900 feet (1,500 m) short of the runway.

A worker on a nearby tugboat said that he saw the aircraft flying very low over the river before it struck the water with a loud noise. Another worker on the tugboat also saw the crash and described the aircraft as appearing to strike the river at a nose-down angle. A motorist approaching the Whitestone Bridge said that he saw the aircraft pass overhead only about 100 feet (30 m) above the ground. He did not notice if the landing gear was extended, but he said he could see the whole underside of the aircraft, and the lights in its windows. Surviving passengers and flight attendants, on the other hand, said that the descent before the impact was uneventful and routine. Residents in the surrounding area said they heard the Electra pass overhead and that it sounded lower than planes normally flying in the area.

The accident was the first crash involving the Lockheed L-188 Electra. It was the also first major accident involving an American Airlines aircraft since the crash of American Airlines Flight 327 on January 6, 1957.

== Aftermath ==
A privately owned tugboat from New England was operating near the crash site when its crew saw and heard the impact. The crew released the barges that they had been towing and headed to the crash site, becoming the first rescuers to arrive. They lit up the area with the tugboat's searchlight, and rescued all of the crash survivors, including one man who was pulled up from four feet (1 m) below the surface of the water. Two police helicopters and at least a dozen boats from the Coast Guard and the New York Police Department arrived within minutes. In the darkness and the fog, rescuers could hear survivors calling for help, but poor visibility and strong river currents made the rescue and recovery efforts difficult. Responders and residents in the area heard cries for help from locations further downstream.

Public safety agencies set up four rescue stations along the river to receive and evacuate survivors. Ambulances transporting injured victims to hospitals were slowed by icy road conditions. Survivors were taken to Flushing Hospital and Queens General Hospital. Two temporary morgues were set up on opposite sides of the river to receive recovered victims.

By 5:00 a.m. the next morning, at least 9 survivors had been rescued, 22 bodies had been recovered, and 39 people were still missing. High winds and driving rain forced officials to suspend the rescue operation. One of the survivors who had been taken to a hospital later died from her injuries. The New York Red Cross supplied rare blood types for treatment of the victims of the crash. Recovered bodies were taken to Queens General Hospital for identification, with agents of the Federal Bureau of Investigation and 25 city detectives assisting in the process. The investigators used fingerprint records from immigration, personal identification, and military service files to help identify the victims. Autopsies of twenty victims found fatal chest and neck injuries, giving an indication of the force of the impact.

When the plane crashed, the fuselage broke into several pieces, but one section about twenty feet (6 m) long remained in one piece. Two hours after the crash, about three feet (1 m) of the aircraft's tail was the only part of the aircraft that still remained above the surface of the water. Search crews on boats and along the shoreline recovered aircraft debris, personal belongings, and mail.

In Washington, D.C., the Civil Aeronautics Board (CAB) dispatched two investigators shortly after being notified of the crash, and ordered the American Airlines' records to be secured. An additional team of 25 investigators was assembled and sent to New York the following day. The team was given the task of investigating all aspects of the flight, including the weather, flight operations, engines and propellers, flight instruments, and aircraft structures. Queens County District Attorney Frank O'Connor opened a separate inquiry into the effectiveness of the rescue response, telling reporters that more passengers might have been saved if there had been a system of rescue boats available to serve the city's two airports. The House Interstate and Foreign Commerce Committee also asked the head of the Federal Aviation Agency (FAA) to brief the committee on the accident in a closed session. After the two and a half hour meeting, the committee formed a special House subcommittee to investigate both the crash and broader safety issues associated with the transition to jet and turboprop aircraft.

Days after the crash, newspapers reported that there was airport equipment that might have assisted the crew during the approach and could have prevented the crash. A representative of the Air Line Pilots Association said that a system of flashing approach lights, called an Electronic Flash Approach System, could have helped the pilot judge his altitude if one had been present. The association also called for a more comprehensive instrument landing system that would have provided horizontal and vertical guidance to flight crews landing on runway 22. The system then in use provided only horizontal guidance, although such a system was already installed for the same runway for aircraft approaching from the opposite direction. At the time, only two airports in the United States had instrument landing systems for approaches in both directions on the same runway. (Note: The two airports were New York International Airport, installed since July 1957, and Newark Metropolitan Airport, installed since March 1958.) At a meeting on February 5, commissioners of the Port of New York Authority said that installing such equipment for such a system for runway 22 would be difficult because the approach lighting system structures would block the waterway used by ships traveling to docks in Queens.

== Aircraft ==
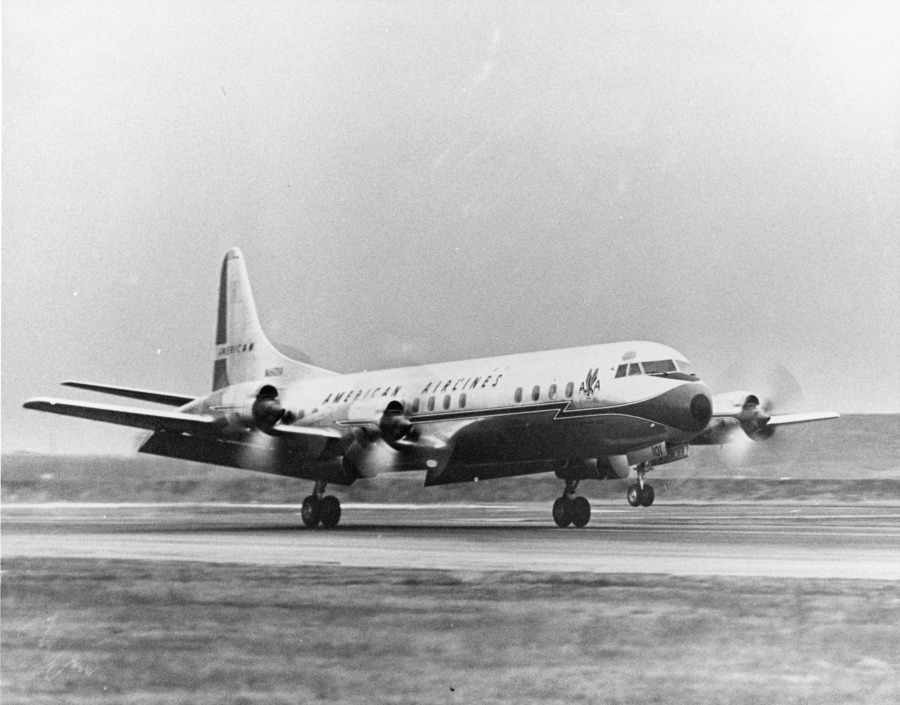
The involved aircraft taken prior to the accident

The aircraft was a Lockheed L-188 Electra turbine propeller aircraft, serial number 1015, registered as tail number N6101A. This was one of the first Electras delivered to American Airlines, and was named "Flagship New York". Construction had been completed by the Lockheed Aircraft Corporation on November 27, 1958. At the time of the crash, the aircraft had flown for a total of 302 hours. It was powered by four Allison 501-D13 engines.

Promoted as an efficient, fast, and profitable aircraft, the Electra was the first turboprop aircraft to be produced in the United States. The first plane was delivered to Eastern Air Lines in October 1958, and the airline began commercial Electra service on January 1, 1959. American Airlines received its first Electra in December 1958 and its first commercial flight was twelve days before the crash.

Two other Electras crashed within a relatively short period after Flight 320 after suffering catastrophic structural failures, killing everyone aboard. Braniff Airways Flight 542 crashed in September 1959, and Northwest Airlines Flight 710 crashed in March 1960. An investigation by Lockheed identified the cause of those two accidents as defects involving the engine mounts and the structural design of the wings, and Electras were modified to correct them. However, the negative publicity surrounding the series of Electra accidents caused public concern about the safety of the aircraft, and only 174 were ever produced.

== Passengers and crew ==
Flight 320 carried 68 passengers and 5 crew members, all of whom were residents of the United States. Five passengers survived the crash, and the bodies of two of the victims were never recovered. The captain and one of the two flight attendants were among those killed. Among the passengers who died were Beulah Zachary, executive producer of the television series Kukla, Fran and Ollie, Robert Emerson, a research professor at the University of Illinois known for his work on photosynthesis, and Herbert Greenwald, a Chicago real estate developer.

The captain, 59-year-old Albert Hunt DeWitt, had begun his aviation career in 1929 with the Thompson Aeronautical Corporation of Cleveland, which was later acquired by American Airlines. A resident of Decatur, Michigan, he was qualified to fly all of the aircraft that had been operated by American Airlines and was considered one of the most experienced commercial pilots in the world, with seven million miles flown. He had a total of 28,135 hours of flight experience, including 48 hours in the Lockheed Electra and 2,500 hours of instrument time, and had at one time acted as one of American's chief pilots in the New York area. DeWitt's cause of death was listed as drowning, but the medical examiner said that he had also sustained severe internal injuries that probably would have been fatal on their own.

The first officer, 33-year-old Frank Hlavacek of Wilmette, Illinois, had worked for American Airlines for eight years. He had a total of 10,192 logged hours, including 36 hours in the Electra. He had been flying since he was 14 years old and had served with the United States Army Air Forces in World War II. Before joining American Airlines, he had owned his own air service based in La Jolla, California. After the crash, Hlavacek helped two other survivors reach part of the plane's wing, where they were rescued. He suffered fractures of the jaw, pelvis, and both legs, as well as internal injuries, but recovered and later returned to work for American Airlines.

The flight engineer, 36-year-old Warren Cook, had worked for American Airlines for eleven years. He had a total of 8,700 flying hours, of which 81 were in the Electra. He served in the United States Army Air Corps from 1940 to 1945. Cook suffered a back injury, cuts, and bruises in the crash and returned to work for American Airlines after recovering.

== Investigation ==
Within two hours of the crash, investigators interviewed flight engineer Warren Cook. He told them that the approach to the airport was routine and that impact with the river came without warning. Because of his injuries, investigators did not interview first officer Frank Hlavacek until several days later. He told them that during the descent, he had been calling out altimeter readings to Captain DeWitt in one-hundred-foot (30 m) increments. He said he had just called out "five hundred feet" when the aircraft struck the river. Although both pilots were interviewed separately and at different locations, both said that the impact occurred just as Hlavacek was calling out the 500-foot (150 m) reading.

Investigators began recovering the wreckage as soon as weather conditions permitted. By February 5, approximately 25 percent of the plane had been recovered, and they had recovered about half of it by the following day. On the day after the crash, salvage crews attempted to raise the fuselage from the river using cranes, but it broke apart and most of it fell back into the water. The tail section was recovered on the evening of February 5. Newspapers reported that that the damage to the section suggested that the aircraft had struck the water in a "nose up" attitude, possibly after the pilots attempted to climb after realizing they were short of the runway. Divers searched for additional wreckage in the river, but high winds, strong currents, and low visibility in the water hindered the effort. Some debris was carried considerable distances by the current; pieces of the aircraft were recovered as far away as Northport, Long Island, more than thirty miles (50 km) from the crash site. Recovered wreckage was identified, tagged, cleaned, and moved to Hangar 9 of the Marine Air Terminal of LaGuardia Airport for further examination. The nose section and cockpit of the plane were recovered late on February 7. The cockpit was relatively intact, and the spring-wound clock on the instrument panel was still running when it was recovered from the river.

On February 9, in response to the accident, the FAA temporarily increased the minimum visibility requirements for Lockheed Electra landings in poor weather. American Airlines and Eastern Airlines, the only two airlines that were flying the Electras at that point, said that the restrictions were only temporary and that they expected the restrictions to remain in effect only for a few days. Representatives of Lockheed Aircraft Corporation expressed disappointment with the change, but said the company would continue to cooperate with the investigation. The following day, the FAA rescinded the temporary restrictions and restored the previous visibility requirements for Electra operations.

=== Altimeter concerns ===
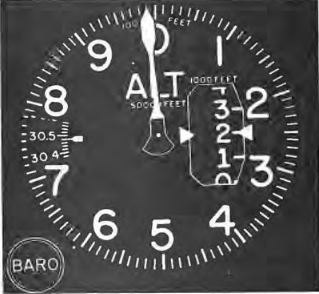
A drum-pointer-type altimeter display, with a single needle indicating tens and hundreds of feet, and a rotating drum indicating thousands of feet. This image depicts an altitude of 1,990 feet.

An illustration of the old-style three-pointer altimeter showing an altitude of 10,180 feet

The altimeters used in the aircraft were an early focus of the investigation. The instruments installed in the Electra differed from the three-hand altimeters that were commonly used in older piston-powered aircraft. The older design used three hands of different lengths to indicate altitude, while the new design combined a single pointer with graduations indicating tens and hundreds of feet with a rectangular display with numbers printed on a rotating drum that indicated thousands of feet. The Kollsman Instrument Corporation, which manufactured both types, described the new style as a "precision drum altimeter" and said that the design was the result of research performed on behalf of the United States Air Force to meet the requirements of faster flight. The Air Force had previously reported cases where its pilots had misread three-hand altimeters by 10,000 feet (3,000 m). Pilots that trained with the newer drum-type instruments had also reported misreadings, in some cases resulting in altitude errors of as much as 1,000 feet (300 m).

Because of the confusion between the styles of altimeter, sources said that American Airlines had considered installing a third, three-needle altimeter in the center of the instrument panel while continuing to use the drum altimeters on the left and right sides of the instrument panel. Eastern Airlines pilots had complained that the new altimeters were easy to misread, and that they responded to altitude changes slower than the three-hand type. Eastern had installed a third, three-hand altimeter in its Electra cockpits. American Airlines defended the drum altimeter as "a new and far superior altimeter with finer gradations" and denied that it had received complaints from any of its pilots. The airline acknowledged plans to install a third altimeter in the center of the cockpit, but told the New York Times that the additional instrument would also be the newer drum model. Flight crews quoted by the Chicago Tribune, however, said that their understanding was that the third unit was to have been an older three-hand model. At the time of the accident, the aircraft in Flight 320 was equipped only with the two drum-type altimeters.

When the FAA rescinded its temporary landing restrictions on Electra operations, it did so on the condition that the newer altimeters be replaced with three-hand models. American and Eastern both agreed to make the change as a precaution. On February 20, 1959, the FAA imposed a similar restriction on Boeing 707 aircraft equipped with the drum altimeters, citing unspecified "operational difficulties in the last few days".

The CAB opened an investigative hearing in New York City on March 18, 1959. First officer Hlavacek repeated the information that he had given in his earlier interviews, testifying that he and the other crew members had compared their altimeter readings several times during the flight, including while passing Newark, New Jersey, and that his altimeter and the captain's had agreed closely. He said that Captain DeWitt had been flying the plane on autopilot during the approach, making small manual corrections as needed. He also testified that some ice had accumulated near the top of the windshield, but the crew did not consider ice accumulation to be a likely flight hazard. He did not see the runway lights ahead at any point, but recalled seeing several reddish lights pass his side windows shortly before impact.

During the hearing, flight engineer Cook was questioned about an interview he had given immediately after the crash in which he was reported as saying that the altimeter indicated less than one hundred feet when the plane impacted the river. Cook testified that it had shown five hundred feet (two hundred meters), and that he had been in a state of shock when he had been interviewed. He said that in his mind, he had confused the "1" on the drum display to with one hundred feet instead of one thousand feet. He also confirmed that he had activated the de-icing equipment before the descent, and that DeWitt had been using the autopilot during the approach. Cook, who had flown with DeWitt since 1951, said it was Dewitt's usual practice to remain on autopilot until about 400 feet (100 m) above the ground before taking full manual control of the plane. He also testified that he had not seen the airport's approach lights through the windshield before the crash.

Investigators had taken the recovered altimeters to the instrument shop at LaGuardia Airport for examination. On February 26, the Chicago Tribune reported that, after corrosion, water, and debris had been removed, both instruments operated normally in a pressure chamber down to about 1,000 feet (300 m) above ground pressure level, but they stuck or lagged at lower simulated altitudes. However, at the March hearing, the manufacturer of the altimeters submitted written testimony that there was no evidence of a mechanical failure or malfunction before the crash. When they had been recovered from the river, the captain's and first officer's instruments indicated −1,500 feet (−460 m) and −1,640 feet (−500 m), respectively, readings attributed to damage to parts of the altimeters caused by immersion pressure. Investigators acknowledged that the recovered instruments could not establish exactly what either altimeter had displayed at the moment of impact. American Airlines's director of flying testified that a simultaneous malfunction of two altimeters at the same time was "almost mathematically impossible". The CAB also heard evidence from Lockheed engineers who had attempted to reproduce the approximately 500-foot (200 m) discrepancy described by the crew by simulating icing and other disturbances in the pressure system supplying the altimeters. Tests included flying an Electra behind an Air Force tanker spraying ice water, intentionally blocking the line, disrupting the air flow around the pressure port, and directing a stream of water directly into the port. None of the tests reproduced an error of the reported magnitude, and produced an error of at most 40 to 50 feet (10 to 20 m).

The CAB also examined why the crew had not been able to see the runway before impact. Two pilots of a Northeast Airlines DC-3 that landed at La Guardia Airport a minute or two ahead of Flight 320 testified that they descended below the 400-foot (100 m) cloud ceiling without difficulty and could see the full length of the runway. However, crash survivors and crew members aboard the rescue tug said that an isolated area of fog and low cloud had moved over the river around the time of the crash.

=== Final report ===
The CAB released a final report on the accident on January 10, 1960. The result of the investigation was that the crew of Flight 320 had been preoccupied with aspects of the flight and had failed to monitor essential flight instruments during the descent. This caused them to fly the plane below the intended glide path. Contributing to the accident were factors that included the crew's limited experience with the Electra, Captain DeWitt's use of autopilot approaching ground level, an incorrect setting on one of the altimeters, and the possibility that the crew had misinterpreted the altimeter and the rate of descent instruments on the aircraft. It also mentioned the poor weather conditions in the approach area and lack of visual references that would have helped the crew recognize that they were flying lower than they intended. The board was critical of American Airlines's lack of a comprehensive simulator training program for its pilots flying the Electra, calling the accident potentially avoidable if such a program had been in place. It also recommended that the FAA adopt new regulations to require flight data recorders on all large turbine-engine aircraft used in commercial air transportation.

Investigators recovered over 90 percent of the primary structural components of the aircraft and most of the system's components. They found that at the moment of impact, the flaps were correctly set for the approach and that the landing gear was extended. The propeller blade angles were relatively uniform and consistent with the power readings displayed on the instruments recovered from the aircraft, and matched the power levels that the pilots said they were using during the approach. Neither of the two vertical speed indicator mechanisms were recovered. Both altimeters were recovered, but their diaphragms had been overstressed during submersion, making it impossible to determine if either instrument had been displaying accurate information before the crash.

Investigators obtained all of the maintenance and pilot complaint records of all operators, civil and military, of the new drum altimeters. They did not find any example where more than one of the altimeters had failed at the same time, and after reviewing the possibility of a simultaneous failure of both altimeters, the CAB concluded that it would involve such an extreme mathematical improbability that it chose to reject the theory of a simultaneous failure, and it rejected parts of the testimony of the surviving crew members. It concluded that after consideration of all possible scenarios, a failure of just one of the altimeters was also unlikely to have occurred. Based on eyewitness testimony and the analysis of the impact, the CAB concluded that it was likely that one or more of the pilots had misread the altimeter due to their unfamiliarity with the new style. It also said there was a possibility that in addition, the pilots had misread the vertical speed indicators, which used a different scale than what had been used in older aircraft and well as in the training that the captain had received.

The CAB concluded that all of the required airport, boundary, and runway lights were on and functioning at the time of the accident. However, because the lights were slanted upward at between three and five degrees, and because of a dike located between the end of runway 22 and the water, the CAB concluded that they would not have been visible to the crew because of the aircraft's premature descent below the cloud level.

The president of the Air Line Pilots Association criticized the CAB's conclusions, and called the report "grossly inaccurate in a number of respects". He said the report failed to reasonably explain the cause of the accident, and it assumed factors that were not supported by evidence. He said that all of the pilots at American Airlines were united in their criticism of the report, saying it "slandered and wrongfully accused" crew members of the plane, and was aimed at "conveniently writing the accident off the books" rather than accurately determining a cause. He said that in the association's judgement, the crash was the result of marginal weather conditions and inadequate approach and lighting aids at the airport. First officer Frank Hlavacek said he was "furious" over the CAB report, saying the board tried to take the easy way out by blaming a dead captain. He said he hoped that American Airlines would protest the report.

== Additional investigations ==
On February 6, 1959, the United States House Commerce Committee named a special subcommittee to investigate the crash and the related safety issues that the aviation industry had been encountering during the transition from piston aircraft to jet and turboprop aircraft. The subcommittee was headed by Representative John Bell Williams of Mississippi, a former World War II bomber pilot. House Commerce Committee Chairman Oren Harris of Arkansas said the subcommittee would look at some aspects of the new aircraft, including the equipment that was being used and the training of the pilots. The seven members of the subcommittee visited LaGuardia Airport on February 12 and inspected the runway where Flight 320 had been approaching, but refused to publicly discuss the results of their investigation.

During hearings of the aviation subcommittee of the Senate Commerce Committee in January 1960, the safety director for the CAB testified that if high-intensity lights had been present at the LaGuardia runway, "the accident probably would not have happened". He also called for more training of copilots and for the installation of electronic flight recorders in aircraft to assist with accident investigations. As a result of the testimony, three of the senators on the subcommittee asked for the installation of modern lighting systems at Chicago's Midway Airport and other landing fields, and for new regulations that required copilots to be certified on the aircraft they fly. Elwood Richard Quesada, administrator of the FAA, testified that before the accident, the government had pledged to pay 75 percent of the cost to install high-intensity lighting and radar approaches at La Guardia, but that officials at the airport had failed to come up with the required 25 percent for the local contribution.

== Legacy ==
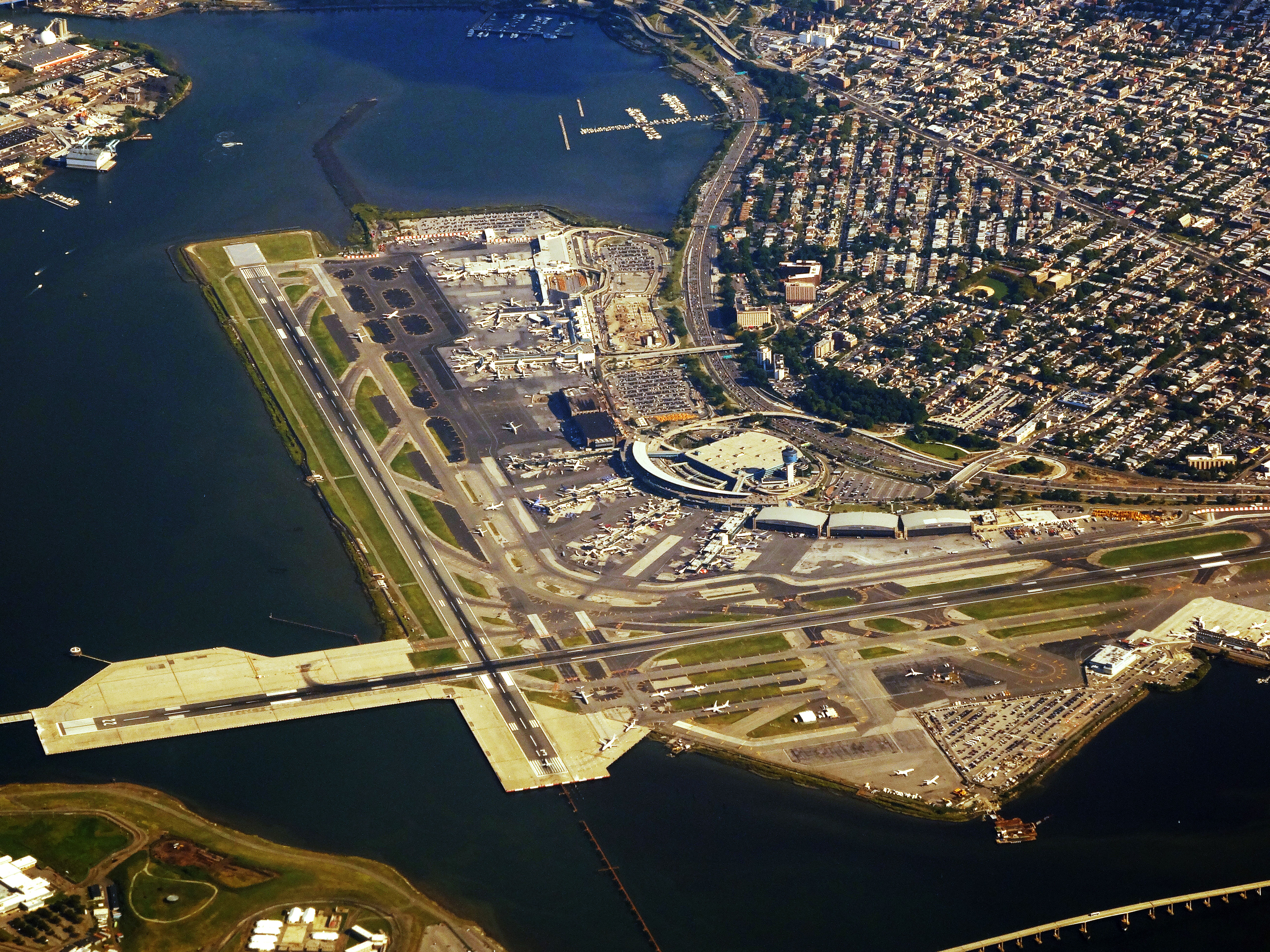
LaGuardia Airport from the air in 2014. Extensions to Runway 4/22, running horizontally along the bottom of the photo, and Runway 13/31 running vertically, extend into the East River, blocking the former Rikers Island Channel in the lower left

Citing the lessons learned from the crash of American Airlines Flight 320, in March 1960, the FAA and the New York Port Authority announced plans to add approach lights and an instrument landing system to runway 22 at La Guardia Airport. Part of the project required the closure of the Rikers Island Channel and the construction of a replacement, requiring approval and coordination from the United States Army Corps of Engineers. The first phase, construction of an 825-foot (251 m) approach lighting system, was completed in March 1961, extending just to the edge of the Rikers Island Channel. In 1962, the Port Authority announced that new approval for the relocation of the ship channel was expected, and that in addition to the instrument landing system, it would also extend runway 4/22 from 5,000 feet (1,500 m) to 7,000 feet (2,100 m) long, and runway 13/31 from 5,965 feet (1,818 m) to 7,000 feet (2,100 m) long. Runway 22 would be equipped with a full instrument landing system and a full 3,000-foot (910 m) approach lighting system. The $42 million project was completed in March 1966.

In 1957, the CAB started requiring the installation of a flight data recorder on all large turbine-powered aircraft that were used in civil aviation that were certified for flight above 25,000 feet (7,600 m). Although the Lockheed Electra was able to fly higher than that, American Airlines elected to request certification of the Electra only to a maximum altitude of 25,000 feet, bypassing the requirement of flight data recorders. The final CAB Accident report, released in January 1960, made the recommendation that the FAA amend regulations to require the installation of flight data recorders in all large turbine-powered aircraft to provide a durable record that could assist air crash investigations. On April 1, 1960, The FAA announced that it would consider a rule to require the installation of flight recorders in all turboprop airliners. That July, it ordered the installation of flight data recorders in turbine-powered carrier aircraft operated by U.S. Airlines by that November. The Air Transport Association complained that the minor improvement to crash investigations was not worth the installation expense and the extra weight of the recorders. The FAA did not back down, but it did extend the installation deadline to May 1, 1961. By 1964, the FAA proposed additional requirements for the installation of cockpit voice recorders in all large commercial aircraft by July 1966. Those recorders would assist air crash investigators by providing details about flight crew conversations during emergency situations.
