= Lockheed Electra wing failure investigation =

1959–60 American plane crash investigations

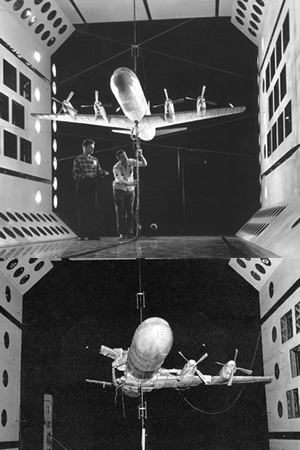
- Testing a one-eighth scale model of a Lockheed Electra in NASA's 19-foot wind tunnel at the Langley Research Center
- Date: Crash of Braniff Airways Flight 542: September 29, 1959; Crash of Northwest Airlines Flight 710: March 17, 1960; First FAA restrictions: March 20, 1960; Additional FAA restrictions: March 26, 1960; Lockheed announcement of cause: May 12, 1960; Removal of FAA restrictions: January 5, 1961
- Duration: 9 months and 16 days
- Budget: To discover cause: $2.5 million (equivalent to $27 million in 2025); To implement changes: $25 million (equivalent to $272 million in 2025)
- Participants: Lockheed Corporation

Following two fatal accidents in 1959 and 1960 in the United States involving the Lockheed L-188 Electra turboprop airliner, the Federal Aviation Agency (FAA) and Lockheed launched an extensive investigation into the accidents' causes. Braniff Airways Flight 542 and Northwest Airlines Flight 710, both operating with relatively new, high-speed Lockheed Electra aircraft, had crashed six months apart after suffering in-flight breakups where in each case, at least one of the wings had separated from the fuselage. Investigators working on the first accident had not yet managed to determine the cause of the wing failure when the second accident occurred, in an almost identical manner. The FAA imposed speed restrictions on the aircraft until a cause could be identified, and ordered Lockheed to reevaluate the structural integrity of the aircraft and demonstrate its airworthiness. The subsequent investigation, involving over 250 engineers and technicians, discovered that when an Electra with damage to the mounting structures of one of the outboard engines flew at high speeds or in areas of turbulence, a destructive phenomenon called whirl mode wing flutter could occur, leading to wing failure.

== Background ==
The Lockheed L-188 Electra was a four-engine turbine-propeller, short-to-medium-range pressurized aircraft that could seat up to 90 passengers. Developed in the mid-1950s, the first commercial flight in an Electra occurred in January 1959. With its turbine engines, the Electra flew 100 miles per hour (87 kn; 160 km/h) faster than any piston-engined aircraft of its time, and shortened flight times by an average of twenty percent. American Airlines, which started flying the Electra between New York and Chicago in January, reported that eighty percent of the seats on its Electra flights were sold, twenty percent higher than the sales rate of their flights on piston aircraft.

In the early days of Electra flights, operators reported excessive vibration in the aircraft during flight, especially in the seats in line with the four propellers. Lockheed Corporation resolved the issue by reinforcing the wings of all Electras and adjusting the mounting angle of the engines upward about three degrees. A fatal crash of American Airlines Flight 320 in New York city after only two weeks of flying the aircraft type was blamed on its pilots misreading the new-style altimeters. Airlines replaced the altimeters with the older, more familiar type and the accident did not have a significant effect on the Electra's popularity with the flying public. Over the next eight months, airliners flew the Electra for nearly 80,000 hours of mostly trouble-free operation.

On September 29, 1959, the Electra operating Braniff Airways Flight 542 exploded in the air over Buffalo, Texas and crashed, killing the 34 occupants of the aircraft. The left wing was found to have broken off about a foot or two from where it attached to the fuselage and fell to the ground about a mile (2 km) from the rest of the wreckage. After more than six months of investigation, officials from the Civil Aeronautics Board (CAB) knew that the wing had broken off in flight, but they were unable to pinpoint what had caused the break. Running out of ideas, the officials were preparing to close the investigation without identifying a probable cause.

On March 17, 1960, Northwest Airlines Flight 710, en route from Chicago to Miami, crashed near Tell City, Indiana, killing all 63 people on board. The aircraft was a seven-month-old Lockheed Electra, and witnesses to that accident described seeing the aircraft explode in flight, then crash to the ground. An initial examination of the wreckage revealed that the entire right wing and portions of the left wing had broken off the aircraft while it was in flight.

== FAA Response ==
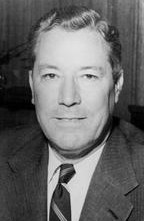
FAA Administrator Pete Quesada in 1961

On March 20, three days after the Northwest Airlines crash, the Federal Aviation Agency (FAA) issued an emergency order that restricted the maximum airspeed of the Lockheed Electra to 275 knots (320 mph; 510 km/h), down from its normal cruising speed of 360 knots (410 mph; 670 km/h). FAA Administrator Pete Quesada called the restrictions a "safety precaution", since there appeared to be an alarming similarity between the Northwest and Braniff crashes. Lockheed representatives said that the company supported the FAA's airspeed restrictions in the aftermath of the Northwest crash, while the investigations of the crashes were conducted.

The FAA's action was the first major aviation restriction imposed by the United States government on an aircraft model since 1948, when the CAB grounded the entire domestic fleet of Martin 2-0-2 aircraft as a result of the investigation of the crash of Northwest Airlines Flight 421. In that 1948 accident, the two-engine aircraft lost a wing in a thunderstorm and crashed near Winona, Minnesota, killing the 37 people on board. Crash investigators discovered an aircraft design flaw that caused the metal in the wings to suffer rapid fatigue damage, and the CAB grounded all of the aircraft until The Martin Company could replace the defective components.

Members of the CAB felt that the FAA's Electra speed limit was not enough, and urged it to ground all Electras until the cause of the crashes were identified. An officer of the CAB's Bureau of Safety stated that if a third Electra were to crash the same way, the reputation of the Electra and the two federal agencies that were responsible for aviation safety would be ruined forever. CAB officials that were in Tell City investigating the Northwest Airlines crash were so uncomfortable with the safety of the Electra that they had refused to travel aboard the aircraft type on their return trip to Washington.

Three days after the emergency order, the FAA held closed-door meetings with about 60 representatives of the FAA, CAB, NASA, Lockheed, the engine manufacturer, and the presidents or vice presidents of every domestic airline that operated the Electra. The doors were locked, no minutes of the meeting were taken, and there were no reporters present. One reporter who attempted to get into the meeting was turned away by FAA Chairman Elwood Quesada, who told him, "This is going to be a highly technical meeting and we want to let these people say what they have to say freely." Quesada started the meeting by stating that it was to be an informal discussion of how the FAA intended to respond to the Electra situation, and to find out how the operators and manufacturers of the Electra were feeling. After talking about what steps the FAA planned to take, Quesada asked for comments. Lockheed's representative discussed some of the testing that the company had already started to perform on the Electras. CAB Chairman James Durfee repeated the board's recommendation to ground all Electras. A visibly upset Donald Nyrop of Northwest Airlines stated that his company was going to voluntarily ground all of their Electras, and that he had already asked Lockheed to return the Boeing Stratocruisers the company had traded in when it purchased its Electras. The other carriers protested, saying that if Northwest Airlines grounded its fleet, public opinion would force them to ground theirs as well. After pleading with Nyrop, the executives from the other airlines were able to persuade him to keep his company's Electras flying. At the conclusion of the meeting, Quesada released a statement to reporters that said, "We have conducted an informal and informative meeting with airline operators and the engine and airframe manufacturers of Lockheed Electra to exchange all information now available on the history and operation of this aircraft," and "The meeting was constructive, helpful, and informative and will assist us materially in developing any appropriate action."

On March 26, the FAA issued new orders that placed additional restrictions on the operations of the Lockheed Electra. The maximum airspeed was further reduced to 225 knots (260 mph; 420 km/h). The FAA called the additional speed reduction the additional of a substantial margin of safety to flights on the Electras, since the initial investigation of the Northwest flight revealed that it had likely encountered severe turbulence shortly before the crash. The reduced speeds would give pilots the ability to quickly slow down to safe speeds if they suddenly encountered unexpected turbulence. Because there was also a concern that a rare malfunction in the Electra's autopilot may have caused the aircraft to suddenly enter a steep climb or dive without warning, the FAA ordered that all autopilot units on Electras be disabled until approved fixes could be applied. The FAA urged operators of the aircraft type to strictly follow Lockheed's refueling guidelines on the aircraft, as the FAA was concerned that fuel leaks that may have happened during refueling could have led to corrosion and weakening of the wings.

The FAA's orders also required the operators of the Electras to immediately perform a series of tests and inspections on all of the Electras in their fleets. Airlines were required to inspect the wings of each aircraft, and reinspections were required immediately after any flight where the aircraft had experienced turbulence, or after any hard or overweight landings. The FAA ordered its own inspectors to increase the number of in-flight reviews of Electra flight crews, and to pay special attention to whether their pre-flight briefing included worst-case weather plans with a special emphasis on avoiding areas of severe turbulence. The inspectors were also ordered to verify that the new speed restrictions were being observed and that pilot training clearly emphasized the importance of the new limits.

Finally, the FAA ordered Lockheed to answer questions about the airworthiness of the Electra. Lockheed had to perform a complete review of the Electra's "basic strength criteria", the investigation of which involved the application and measurement of continuous force up to the point of destruction of an Electra wing and its engines. Over the next month, the company conducted a series of tests over a California mountain range, purposely flying a highly-instrumented Electra with different combinations of weight and speed into areas of severe turbulence. The pilots then conducted a series of violent maneuvers to measure the effects on the aircraft. The company also subjected a different plane through a series of tests on the ground that involved mechanically shaking the plane to learn the effects of vibration and stress on key structures in the aircraft. It also removed a complete wing from its Electra assembly line and subjected it to increasingly violent shaking until it was destroyed to learn how it could fail. Competing aircraft manufacturers sent engineers and technical testing equipment to Lockheed to assist with the research.

== Increasing pressure ==
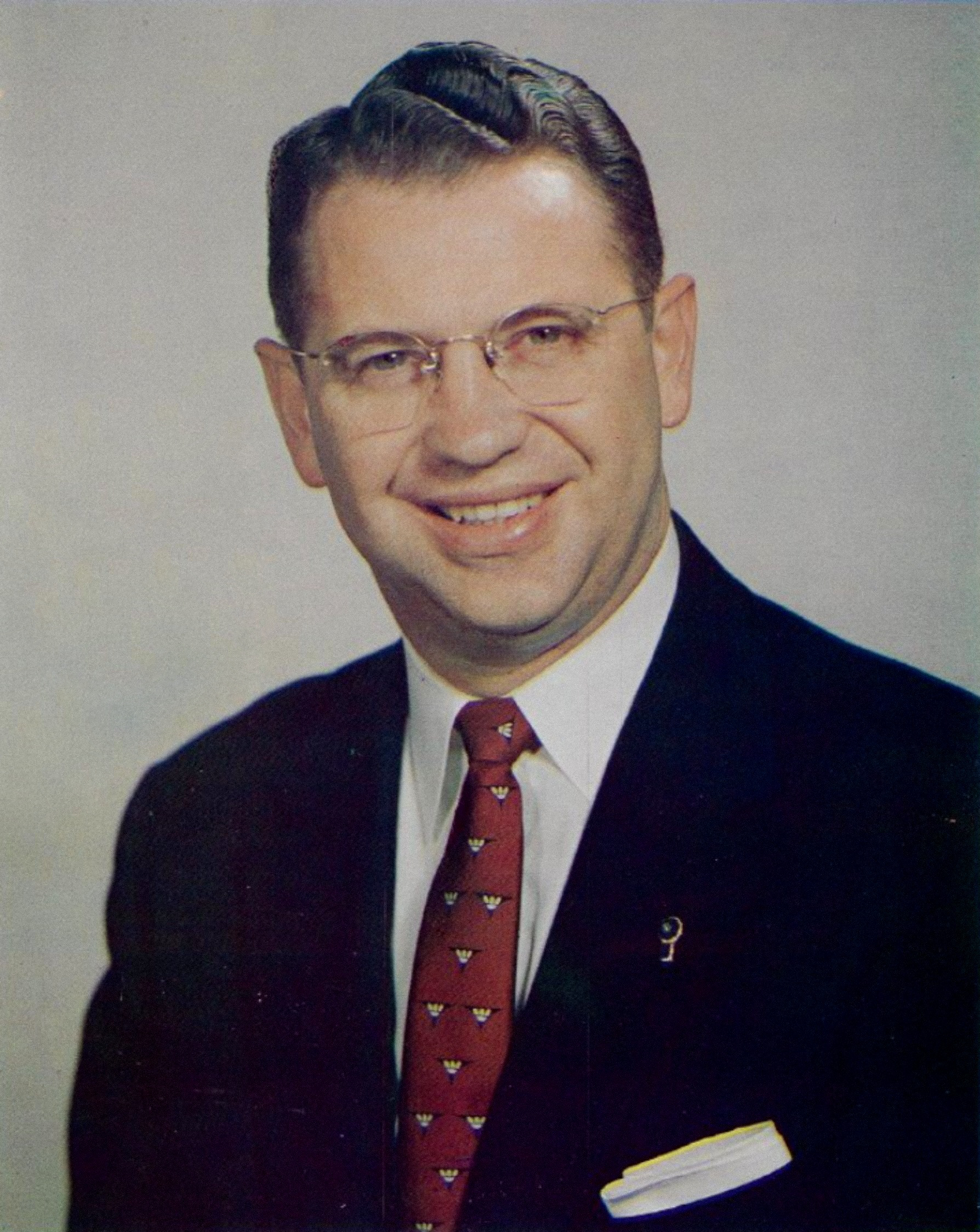
Senator Vance Hartke (D-Indiana) in 1958

The two accidents had severely damaged the public's perception of the safety of the Electra. In the ten days after the Northwest Airlines crash, American Airlines alone reported nearly 2,300 cancelled reservations on Electra flights, with every customer mentioning a previous Electra crash as the reason for the cancellation. Rumors circulated that airlines were planning to get rid of all their Electras or that other aircraft manufacturers had forbidden their employees from flying on Electras. There were rumors that Lockheed had personally bribed Quesada fifty thousand dollars not to ground the Electra. Anti-Electra jokes swept the country, such as "have you joined the Electra crash of the month?" and "Have you read the new Electra book, Look Ma, No Wings?" A disc jockey in Miami told his audience, "Did you hear about the guy who said to the ticket agent, 'I'd like a ticket on the next Electra flight to New York.' The agent replied, 'We don't sell Electra tickets, we sell chances.'"

United States Senator Vance Hartke of Indiana visited the scene of the Northwest Airlines crash in the days following the accident. He was critical of the amount of secrecy that he said surrounded air crash investigators and he pledged to find out whether the amount of mystery surrounding the two Electra crashes was necessary. In the aftermath of the FAA's first speed reduction order, he told the Senate in a speech, "at least [the restrictions] show the agency is taking some action, some action is certainly necessary." He attempted to attend the closed-door meeting with the FAA and airline officials on March 22, but he was not allowed in. He called Quesada's prepared statement to reporters after the meeting "bureaucratic gobbly-degook" that "all adds up to nothing."

Early reports from the mandatory wing inspections of the Electras that were in service showed that of the 41 aircraft that had been inspected so far, 39 of them had some damage to some of their wing-clip rivets. As many as seven rivets were found to be damaged in those aircraft. These rivets are small fasteners that hold the wing's skin to the structural crosspieces, and each aircraft had 2,754 of the clips. Lockheed engineers shrugged off the findings, saying that the small number of failures per aircraft meant that only five one-hundredths of one percent of the clips on any of the aircraft had been found to be damaged, and that rate of failure was typical for what was found in any type of aircraft during an airframe overhaul. The FAA agreed with Lockheed, concluding that the damaged rivets could not have caused the two crashes.

The CAB, on the other hand, thought the rivet failures at such an early stage of an aircraft's service life were signs of a larger problem that could eventually lead to a serious weakening of the wing. On April 13, it met and again unanimously voted to recommend that all Electras be grounded, this time until every aircraft of the type that was operating in the United States could be inspected. There were 135 Electras operating in passenger service at that point, with more than 100 of those operating within the United States. The CAB delivered its recommendation to Quesada, who privately met with the five board members the next day. By then, airlines were completing their Electra inspections at a rate of about four aircraft per day, and all of the inspections were expected to be completed in about a week. At the meeting, Quesada rejected their call to ground the aircraft, but everyone at the meeting agreed to keep the details of the meeting and the grounding recommendation confidential so as not to alarm the public.

Two days later, however, Senator Hartke held a press conference where he announced that the CAB had recommended the grounding of the Electra, and demanded that the FAA ground the aircraft until all of the inspections were completed. He said that by rejecting the recommendation, Quesada was placing the flying public at risk. "I am shocked that General Quesada would take the chance of ignoring this advice and risk further death from these planes," he told reporters. He said that he and the CAB members were convinced that a structural defect in the Electra was the cause of the two crashes, and he called on the Interstate and Foreign Commerce Committee to investigate Quesada for his failure to act. Quesada did not publicly respond to Hartke, but Robert Gross, chairman of Lockheed, came to his defense, explaining that the wing clip problem was not at all unusual and that the Electra was fully safe and airworthy.

On April 19, Hartke made a statement to the full Senate demanding that Quesada publicly explain his decision not to ground the Electra. Stuart Symington (D-Missouri) responded that it was inappropriate for Hartke to attack Quesada, and that it was the FAA's decision, not the CAB's, whether or not to ground the Electra. He mentioned that the FAA's actions were expected to cost Lockheed over $25 million (equivalent to $290 million in 2025). Hartke replied that he was unimpressed with the $25 million figure but that the 63 deaths in Indiana were very concerning, and that one of the victims of the Northwest crash was a personal friend of his. He said that he had asked to personally obtain a copy of the report, but the CAB had told him that they had given it to the FAA, who refused to provide a copy to him.

The next day, an unnamed source told reporters that CAB investigators who were looking into the two crashes had found additional damage in the wings of both of the aircraft that had crashed. The aluminum ribs in the wings of both aircraft were bent, and there were cracks in the overlapping aluminum planking that runs the length of the Electra's wing. The planking is the outer structural skeleton of the wing, and varies in thickness along the wing's length. The damage to both structural components hinted that the wings had experienced severe strain, and at least some of the wing damage might have occurred during hard landings. The unnamed source said that that this information had been provided in detail in the CAB's report that made the grounding recommendation to the FAA.

== Whirl mode wing flutter ==
On May 12, 1960, Lockheed announced that its testing revealed that the two crashes had been caused by destructive whirl mode wing flutter. The company had spent $2.5 million (equivalent to $27 million in 2025) in an eight-week effort to discover the structural issue in the Electra, and involved 250 engineers and technicians in the project.

Wing flutter is a rapid, self-sustaining oscillation of an aircraft’s wings, typically triggered by factors such as aerodynamic disturbances from turbulence or operation at high airspeeds. The Electra was designed and tested to be highly resistant to wing flutter, and able to rapidly dampen it when it occurred. Whirl mode refers to the gyroscopic effect of an aircraft's propeller, which is ordinarily very stable within its plane of rotation and is one of the mechanisms the aircraft uses to help dampen wing flutter. When a strong external force acts to push a propeller out of its plane of rotation, it will begin to wobble, similar to how a spinning top will wobble when it is knocked. In an aircraft, that external force could be from strong air turbulence or from a sudden change in the plane's direction. Ordinarily, the aircraft's engine mounts are designed to help absorb the forces caused by the wobble and return the propeller to a stable plane. Thousands of hours of testing during the Electra design phase had shown that the nacelles of the Electra successfully dampened out whirl mode any time it occurred.

As part of its testing, Lockheed constructed a one-eighth scale model of the Electra and tested it in the Transonic Dynamics Tunnel at NASA's Langley Research Center. In one experiment, when engineers deliberately loosened an outboard engine nacelle on the model, the model developed an unstable whirl mode wobble at speeds over 300 miles per hour (260 kn; 480 km/h). The engineers discovered that when there was damage to the Electra's engine mounting structure, its ability to absorb the energy of the wobble became greatly reduced, and the wobble could then cause further damage to the mounting structure. This cycle continued until the wobble became severe enough that it transferred some energy of the wobble to the wing, leading to wing flutter. This is called whirl mode wing flutter, and as the engine mount became more and more damaged and weakened by the forces of the wobble, more and more energy was transferred to the wing, and the frequency of each wobble and wing flutter increased. Eventually the forces of the induced wing flutter became greater than the wing was designed to withstand, and the structural components of the wing failed after the wing flutter reached a rate of two to three times per second. This failure would occur within thirty to forty seconds, and even if the pilots knew what was happening, there was little they could do to prevent the wing failure. Lockheed described the investigation that led to the discovery as "one of the most profound engineering problems that has confronted the company in three decades of airplane building."

Analysis of the wings of the crashed aircraft showed that the Braniff flight lost its wing during an upward flap, and the Northwest Airlines flight lost its wing during a downward flap. High speed or turbulence alone was not enough to cause the wing flutter, however, nor was damage to one of the engines. Only when both conditions existed would the destructive wing flutter occur. Lockheed was convinced that some degree of damage existed in at least one of the engine mounts on each of the aircraft that had crashed prior to the accidents. The precise cause of the damage to the engine supports was never completely determined. Reports from some of the passengers that had flown on the aircraft to Chicago immediately before the fatal flight to Miami had been that the landing in Chicago had been unusually hard, which could have caused damaged to one of the wings or engine supports. The wreckage of the Northwest aircraft showed that one of the outboard engine struts had failed in a clean tension break that had occurred before the accident. In the case of the aircraft involved in the Braniff accident, severe stress to the wing structure that could have occurred during an improper stall recovery during a training incident a week before the crash may have caused unseen damage to the aircraft. The wreckage of that aircraft revealed that the engine support struts of one of the outboard engines of that aircraft had been bent in multiple directions.

== LEAP ==
After discovering the whirl mode wing flutter issue, Lockheed's engineers were faced with the task of determining what modifications needed to be made to each aircraft for it to be able to withstand the conditions that caused the condition. The Lockheed Electra Action Program, or LEAP, was what the company named the process to reexamine the original aircraft engineering data, find a way to resolve the problem, and apply the necessary repairs to all Electras in service.

The company's engineers redesigned the engine mounts, nacelles and cowlings, and modified the wings of the Electra to increase their strength. The Allison Engine Company redesigned how the gear box of the engines attach to the engine struts. The combined modifications added an additional 1,400 pounds (640 kg) of metal to the aircraft. Performed at a cost to Lockheed of $25 million (equivalent to $270 million in 2025), the modifications received an interim approval from the FAA in late 1960, and a final recertification on December 30, 1960, allowing aircraft that had received the modifications to resume flight at full speed.

The aircraft modification process took place at Lockheed's factory in Burbank, California, in a process that worked on nine aircraft simultaneously over the course of twenty days. Lockheed worked with the airlines to arrange the schedule for each of the repairs, working around each company's holidays, busy periods, and other schedule restrictions. By April, Lockheed had applied the modifications to nearly half of the 165 Electras in airline service around the world. The final Electra to be completed was returned to Ansett-ANA on July 5, 1961.

== Aftermath ==
The reputation of the Electra had suffered greatly during the period between the Northwest Airlines crash and the FAA approval of the Electra modifications, and after the discovery of the whirl mode wing flutter issue, the airlines launched a program to restore the public's trust in the aircraft. In addition to the Braniff and Northwest crashes, two more Electras had crashed during 1960, although neither involved a structural failure of the aircraft. On September 14, 1960, American Airlines Flight 361 crashed during a landing at LaGuardia airport when the aircraft struck a runway dike and flipped over with no fatalities, and on October 4, 1960, 62 people died when Eastern Air Lines Flight 375 crashed during takeoff from Boston's Logan Airport after striking a flock of starlings, leading to engine failure. To counteract negative public perceptions of the Electra, American Airlines sent out what it called "truth squads" or "fact teams". Beginning in November 1960, these teams of pilots, engineers, and public relations staffers traveled from city to city holding news conferences and meeting with politicians and civic groups. They explained the concepts of whirl mode and flutter, outlined the investigation, and described the aircraft redesigns that would resolve the problems. They mentioned the accidents in New York and Boston, and explained that those accidents could have happened with any aircraft, and then opened the meetings to any questions. In two months, the five teams repeated this in 18 of the 26 cities that were being served by Electras. In New York, Chicago, and Washington, D.C., American Airlines offered thirty-minute sight-seeing flights in an Electra for $6.50. The flights ended up being so popular that American expanded the program to Boston, Nashville, Syracuse, Buffalo, Detroit, Hartford, and Philadelphia.

After the modifications, airlines once again started promoting the fact that they offered service on Electras, and made up new names for the modified versions. Some called their modified aircraft the "Electra II". Others called it the "Super Electra" or the "Mark II". By the end of September 1961, American Airlines reported that its load factors on Electras were even higher than they were on pure jets. At Northwest Airlines, load factors on the Electra were higher than almost every type of aircraft the company flew. At Western Airlines, load factors in August had risen to sixty two percent, from a low of forty nine percent. At Braniff Airlines, load factors in Fall 1961 matched the loads on their Boeing 707 fleet, which was a fifty percent increase over Spring 1960. The popularity of Electra flights at Eastern Airlines and National Airlines also recovered. In 1964, the two major vice presidential candidates for the 1964 United States presidential election used chartered Electras on their campaign.

Lockheed ended the production of the L-188 Electra in 1961. The company lost $53 million (equivalent to $570 million in 2025) on the Electra project, with only 170 aircraft ever built. This was due to a number of factors, including the arrival of faster, more competitive pure jet aircraft like the Boeing 707 and Boeing 727. However, the Lockheed P-3 Orion, which was based on the L-188 Electra and designed as an antisubmarine and patrol aircraft for the U.S. Navy, was very successful for the company, and more than 700 aircraft across sixteen variants were produced over thirty years.

Nearly every airline that operated the Electra described it as the most reliable, economical, and efficient aircraft type in its fleet, even surpassing pure jets in some routes. On short flights, the pure jets did not have any speed advantage over the Electra, but used far more fuel. In 1964, there were 165 Electras in commercial service at 14 airlines. As early as 1963, companies attempting purchase new Electras on the second-hand market were being forced to pay prices that were nearly as high as the $2.5 million (equivalent to $26 million in 2025) cost the aircraft had sold for brand new. At least three airlines had standing orders to purchase Electras from other carriers as soon as they were ready to retire them, and one airline turned down an offer of $2 million (equivalent to $21 million in 2025) for one of its used Electras.

== Legacy ==
In 1964, the FAA amended its aircraft design regulations relating to an aircraft's resistance to flutter, deformation, and vibration to require consideration of the effects of a change in the angle of the propeller. The rule change also required aircraft designs to consider what impact a failure of other structural components would have on the amount of vibration experienced by the aircraft. Another rule change more clearly defined the speeds at which an aircraft was required to be free from flutter. The Electra accidents led to designers and regulators taking a closer look at the various ways an aircraft structure can fail, resulting in a more thorough approach being developed to ensure that planes in service remain structurally sound. This included a system of regular, carefully managed inspections to catch damage, whether from manufacturing flaws, damage, fatigue, or environmental effects such as corrosion, before the damage weakens the structure enough to lead to failure.
