= Lockheed Electra Action Program =

1960 investigation into L-188 Electra structural issues

Lockheed Electra Action Program (LEAP)
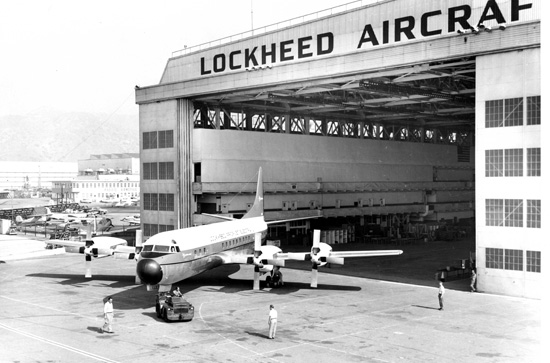
- A Lockheed L-188 Electra outside the Lockheed facility in Burbank, California
- Date: Cause of Electra wing failures announced: May 12, 1960; FAA approval of aircraft modifications: January 5, 1961; Completion of Electra modifications: July 5, 1961
- Duration: 1 year, 1 month and 23 days
- Budget: $25 million (equivalent to $272 million in 2025)
- Participants: Lockheed Corporation and airlines operating the Lockheed L-188 Electra

The Lockheed Electra Action Program (LEAP) was the name of a program by Lockheed Corporation between 1960 and 1961 that was responsible for the design and deployment of modifications to the Lockheed L-188 Electra aircraft to resolve a critical fault that had caused two fatal airline crashes. The investigations of the crashes of Braniff Airways Flight 542 and Northwest Airlines Flight 710 revealed that a previously unanticipated phenomenon called "whirl mode wing flutter" could occur in certain circumstances, and when it did, it would lead to a rapid failure of the wings of the aircraft. Lockheed implemented LEAP to design the needed structural changes to the aircraft to prevent whirl mode wing flutter from occurring and to apply retroactive modifications to all Electras that were already in service. The changes were successful in resolving the issue, and modifications to the final aircraft were completed on July 5, 1961.

== Background ==
On September 29, 1959, a Lockheed L-188 Electra flying Braniff Airways Flight 542 crashed near Buffalo, Texas, killing all 34 occupants. Accident investigators determined that the aircraft had broken up in flight. The left wing appeared to have broken off a foot or two from where it attached to the fuselage, and landed more than a mile (2 km) away from the rest of the wreckage. Despite determined efforts, investigators were unable to identify what had caused the aircraft to break apart. Just as the investigation was coming to a halt after all possibilities had been explored, Northwest Airlines Flight 710 crashed near Tell City, Indiana on March 17, 1960. The aircraft operating that flight was also an Electra, and an early examination of the wreckage revealed that the entire right wing and portions of the left wing had broken off the aircraft while it was in flight.

== Investigation ==
After the Northwest Airlines crash, the Federal Aviation Agency (FAA) issued flight restrictions on the Electras until the cause of the crashes could be determined. Despite pressure from politicians and the Civil Aeronautics Board (CAB) to ground the aircraft until the cause could be identified, the FAA allowed airlines to continue to operate the aircraft under new speed limits and operating restrictions while the investigation continued. The FAA required the operators of Electras to immediately perform a series of tests and inspections on all of the Electras in their fleets to verify their structural inegrity. It also ordered Lockheed to answer questions about the airworthiness of the Electra, and to perform a reevaluation of the aircraft's structural strength.

Over eight weeks, Lockheed conducted an investigation involving 250 engineers and technicians to perform a series of tests on the Electra to determine the cause of the failures. The company performed flight tests a involving highly instrumented Electra in areas of severe turbulence where test pilots performed violent maneuvers to measure the effects on the aircraft. Engineers performed mechanical tests on the ground involving a complete aircraft to measure the effects of vibration and stress on key structures, and performed destructive testing on a wing taken from the factory's production line. They constructed a one-eighth scale model of the Electra and tested it in the Transonic Dynamics Tunnel at NASA's Langley Research Center.

The engineers discovered that when an Electra with damage to the mounting structures of one of the outboard engines flew at high speeds or in areas of turbulence, destructive whirl mode wing flutter could occur, leading to wing failure. Wing flutter is a rapid, self-sustaining oscillation of an aircraft’s wings, typically triggered by factors such as aerodynamic disturbances from turbulence or operation at high airspeeds. The Electra was designed and tested to be highly resistant to wing flutter, and able to rapidly dampen it when it occurred. Whirl mode refers to the gyroscopic effect of an aircraft's propeller, which is ordinarily very stable within its plane of rotation and is one of the mecahnisms the aircraft uses to help dampen wing flutter. When a strong external force acts to push a propeller out of its plane of rotation, it will begin to wobble, similar to how a spinning top will wobble when it is knocked. In an aircraft. that external force could be from strong air turbulence or from a sudden change in the plane's direction. Ordinarily, the aircraft's engine mounts are designed to help absorb the forces caused by the wobble and return the propeller to a stable plane. However, when there was damage to the Electra's engine mounting structure, its ability to absorb the energy of the wobble became greatly reduced, and the wobble could then cause further damage to the mounting structure. This cycle continued until the wobble became severe enough that it transferred some energy of the wobble to the wing, leading to wing flutter. This is called whirl mode wing flutter, and as the engine mount became more and more damaged and weakened by the forces of the wobble, more and more energy was transferred to the wing. Eventually the forces of the induced wing flutter became greater than the wing was designed to withstand, and the structural components of the wing failed.

== LEAP ==
Lockheed described the investigation to discover the cause of the in-flight breakups as "one of the most profound engineering problems that has confronted the company in three decades of airplane building." After discovering the whirl mode wing flutter issue, the company's engineers were faced with the task of determining what modifications needed to be made to each aircraft for it to be able to withstand the conditions that caused the condition. The Lockheed Electra Action Program, or LEAP, was what the company named the process to reexamine the original aircraft engineering data, find a way to resolve the problem, and apply the necessary repairs to all Electras in service. Lockheed estimated that the total cost would be $25 million (equivalent to $270 million in 2025), and it said it would pay the entire cost of the modifications to all Electras. The airlines would be responsible for ferrying the aircraft to be repaired to the Lockheed facility in Burbank, California and returning it to service after the modifications.

Lockheed's goals were to receive FAA approval of the structural changes by November 1, and to complete all of the aircraft modifications by mid-1961. The company's engineers redesigned the engine mounts, nacelles and cowlings, and modified the wings of the Electra to increase their strength. The Allison Engine Company redesigned how the gear box of the engines attach to the engine struts. The combined modifications added an additional 1,400 pounds (640 kg) of metal to the aircraft. The Electra had been designed to allow operators to quickly perform engine replacements, with the engine, reduction gearbox, propeller, and some supporting components contained in a single "Quick Engine Change" unit that could be removed and replaced in two hours. Even though only the outer engine mounts on each wing were affected by the whirl mode problem, Lockheed planned to replace all four engine mounts in order to retain complete interchangability of the engines and quick engine change units. The FAA issued an interim approval of the LEAP modifications on November 30, 1960. This allowed the modifications to proceed on aircraft that would be used in passenger service, but still subject to the FAA's speed restrictions.

Testing of the proposed Electra modifications began in June 1960. Lockheed test pilots used at least four Electras that had received the designed modifications in various conditions, at speeds ranging from normal cruise speeds to well past the aircraft's design limits in a program that a UPI report called "the most ruthless in aviation history." In one example, an Electra with engine mounts that had been deliberately weakened was flown to high altitudes, subjected to a 418 miles per hour (363 kn; 673 km/h) dive, and yanked back to level flight without suffering any ill effects. The tests continued for six months, and in each increasingly difficult flight, the modified aircraft performed as designed.

The FAA recertified the LEAP modified Electra on December 30, 1960, which allowed the aircraft to return to full-speed flight. The agency had given the company interim approval to begin the modification of the first aircraft in late 1960, and when the FAA recertication became public on January 5, 1961, Eastern Airlines announced that it would immediately fly its modified Electra at full speed. The FAA's recertification decision came after it had reviewed the engineering data and the results of the testing, and it removed all operating restrictions from any aircraft that had undergone the modifications. The FAA stated, "The strength of the modified Electras, when operated at higher speeds, will be well above the requirements of the FAA for structural integrity."

The aircraft modification process took place at Lockheed's factory in Burbank, California, in a process that worked on nine aircraft simultaneously over the course of twenty days. Arrangements were made for the airlines to deliver each aircraft to the airport in Burbank before 7:00 a.m. on the day that modifications were scheduled to begin. Lockheed worked with the airlines to arrange the schedule for each of the repairs, working around each company's holidays, busy periods, and other schedule restrictions. Upon arrival at the production line, the engines, nacelles, and wing tips were removed from the aircraft, and the aircraft was inspected and de-fueled. The Quick Engine Change units were taken to one production line and modified with additional engine supports and structural components. On another production line, the rest of the aircraft was moved to a specially designed jig that secured the plane in place while the wing planks and interior wing structural components were replaced. The original engines and modified nacelles were then reinstalled on the aircraft in the same positions after the aircraft was removed from the jig. After refueling and flight testing, the aircraft was returned to the customer. By April, Lockheed had applied the modifications to nearly half of the 165 Electras in airline service around the world. The final Electra to be completed was returned to Ansett-ANA on July 5, 1961. Of the aircraft that went through the LEAP modification process, 96 of them were redelivered ahead of schedule, 17 were delivered on schedule, and 22 were delivered behind schedule.

== Aftermath ==
The reputation of the Electra had suffered greatly during the period between the Northwest Airlines crash and the FAA approval of the Electra modifications, and after the discovery of the whirl mode wing flutter issue, the airlines launched a program to restore the public's trust in the aircraft. To counteract negative public perceptions of the Electra, American Airlines sent out what it called "truth squads" or "fact teams". Beginning in November 1960, these teams of pilots, engineers, and public relations staffers traveled from city to city holding news conferences and meeting with politicians and civic groups. They explained the concepts of whirl mode and flutter, outlined the investigation, and described the aircraft redesigns that would resolve the problems. They mentioned the accidents in New York and Boston, and explained that those accidents could have happened with any aircraft, and then opened the meetings to any questions. In two months, the five teams repeated this in 18 of the 26 cities that were being served by Electras. In New York, Chicago, and Washington, D.C., American Airlines offered thirty-minute sight seeing flights in an Electra for $6.50. The flights ended up being so popular that American expanded the program to Boston, Nashville, Syracuse, Buffalo, Detroit, Hartford, and Philadelphia.

After the LEAP modifications were complete, airlines once again started promoting the fact that they offered service on Electras, and made up new names for the modified versions. Some called their modified aircraft the "Electra II". Others called it the "Super Electra" or the "Mark II". By late 1961, airlines reported that passenger loads had returned to high levels, with some stating that loads were higher than almost every type of aircraft that the company flew.

Nearly every airline that operated the Electra described it as the most reliable, economical, and efficient aircraft type in its fleet, even surpassing pure jets in some routes. On short flights, the pure jets did not have any speed advantage over the Electra, but used far more fuel. Lockheed ended the production of the L-188 Electra in 1961. In 1964, there were 165 Electras in commercial service at 14 airlines. As early as 1963, companies attempting purchase new Electras on the second-hand market were being forced to pay prices that were nearly as high as the $2.5 million (equivalent to $26 million in 2025) cost the aircraft had sold for brand new. At least three airlines had standing orders to purchase Electras from other carriers as soon as they were ready to retire them, and one airline turned down an offer of $2 million (equivalent to $21 million in 2025) for one of its used Electras.
