= Pan Am Flight 115 =

1959 aviation incident over the Atlantic Ocean

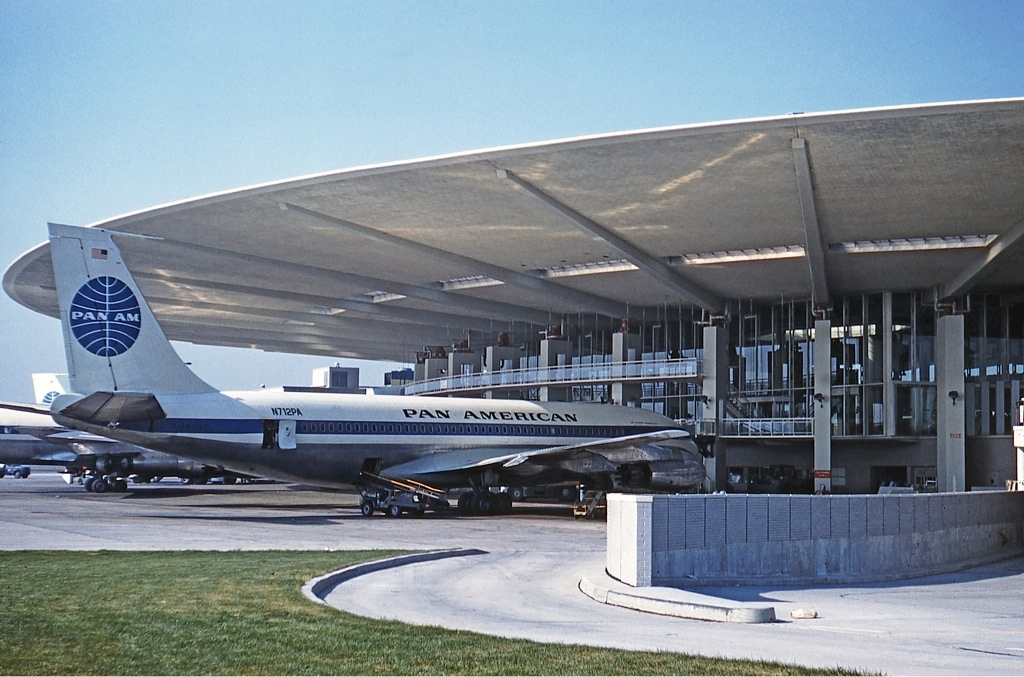
- N712PA, the aircraft involved in the incident, pictured in 1961

Incident
- Date: February 3, 1959
- Summary: Pilot error and poor crew resource management
- Site: Over the North Atlantic Ocean near Newfoundland; 52.5°N 40.5°W

Aircraft
- Aircraft type: Boeing 707-121
- Aircraft name: Clipper Washington
- Operator: Pan American World Airways
- Call sign: CLIPPER 115
- Registration: N712PA
- Flight origin: Paris Orly Airport
- 1st stopover: London Heathrow Airport
- 2nd stopover: Gander International Airport
- Destination: Idlewild International Airport (now John F. Kennedy International Airport)
- Occupants: 129
- Passengers: 119
- Crew: 10
- Fatalities: 0
- Survivors: 129

Pan Am Flight 115 was a commercial flight from Paris via London and Gander to New York City. At 22:05 GMT (16:05 EDT) on February 3, 1959, the Boeing 707 was involved in one of the most significant jet upset incidents of the jet airliner age, over the North Atlantic near Newfoundland. This was one of three notable aviation incidents to occur on this date; the other two were the crash of American Airlines Flight 320 in New York City, and the death of rock and roll artists Buddy Holly, Ritchie Valens, and "The Big Bopper" J.P. Richardson.

== Aircraft ==
The aircraft was a Boeing 707-121 with registration N712PA, nicknamed "Clipper Washington". Its first flight was on October 13, 1958 (the same month that 707s entered regular service with Pan Am), and when the incident occurred less than four months later, the aircraft had accumulated only 705 total flight hours.

== Incident ==
The jet, crewed by pilot-in-command Captain Waldo Lynch, Captain Samuel Peters, flight engineer George Sinski, and navigator John Laird, with 129 people on board, experienced an uncommanded and rapid descent of 29,000 feet (8,800 m) from 35,000 feet (11,000 m).

With the autopilot engaged, the captain left the cockpit and entered the main cabin. During his absence, the autopilot disengaged and the aircraft smoothly and slowly entered a steep descending spiral. The copilot was not properly monitoring the aircraft's instruments or the progress of the flight and was unaware of the actions of the aircraft until considerable speed had been gained and altitude lost. During the rapid descent the copilot was unable to effect recovery. When the captain became aware of the unusual attitude of the aircraft he returned to the cockpit and with the aid of the other crew members was finally able to regain control of the aircraft at approximately 6,000 ft (1,800 m); they later made an emergency landing at Gander with damaged flaps.

== Investigation ==
Evidence was subsequently given to the then United States Civil Aeronautics Board that the aircraft was flying at 35,000 ft (11,000 m) at Mach 0.82 and at a weight of about 195,000 lb (88,000 kg). During the previous two flights the Bendix PB-20 autopilot was reported in one case to have caused a nose-down pitch and in another to have disconnected following a change of heading of 20 degrees, but on February 3 operation was found to be normal on arrival at Gander. The disengagement warning light was fully dimmed.

== Reports ==
Flight magazine's issue of 3 April 1959 reported, "Captain Waldo Lynch, the pilot-in-command, said that the aircraft went into a sharp manoeuvre downward and to the right. At 17,000 ft (5,200 m) the airspeed was over 400 kt, the electric trim button was inoperative, and his gyro horizon had tumbled. The copilot recounted that "At 2200Z the navigator posted a change in heading requiring left turn. Used autopilot turn knob. Turn O.K. . . . Then light buffeting, plus positive load factor building up. . . . Heavy buffeting caused panel lights to fail."

The flight engineer said that he was pinned to his seat as the Mach warning sounded. When the g load was relieved, he pulled the tailplane-power and autopilot circuit-breakers because he thought that the tailplane had "run away." Full nosedown tailplane inclination of 3 degrees was indicated. He wound it back to the nose-up position but later trimmed nose-down.

Aviation Safety Network reports the cause of the incident as unintentional disconnection of autopilot while the captain had left the cockpit to enter the passenger cabin. The copilot did not pay sufficient attention to the instruments and the plane went into a dive in a clockwise spiraling turn.

== Later history of the aircraft ==
After being operated by a number of firms, the airframe was eventually scrapped in August 1984, at Taipei, Taiwan.
