= Beulah Zachary =

American television director and producer

Beulah May Zachary (August 13, 1911 – February 3, 1959) was an American television director and producer.

== Early life and career ==
Zachary was born in Brevard, North Carolina on August 13, 1911, to parents William and Beulah Zachary. She attended Salem College, and intended to become a teacher. She began working in television in 1944, when she was hired by the Chicago-based station WKBK. She is most noted for being the executive producer of the television series Kukla, Fran and Ollie, a puppet show which ran between 1947 and 1957.

== Death ==
Beulah Zachary died in the East River in New York City on February 3, 1959, as one of the 65 casualties of the 1959 American Airlines Flight 320 plane crash. Having never married, she was survived by her father William (who died a few months later) and her older sister Elizbeth Vogler.
