= Buffalo Independent School District =

School district in Texas, United States

Buffalo I.S.D.
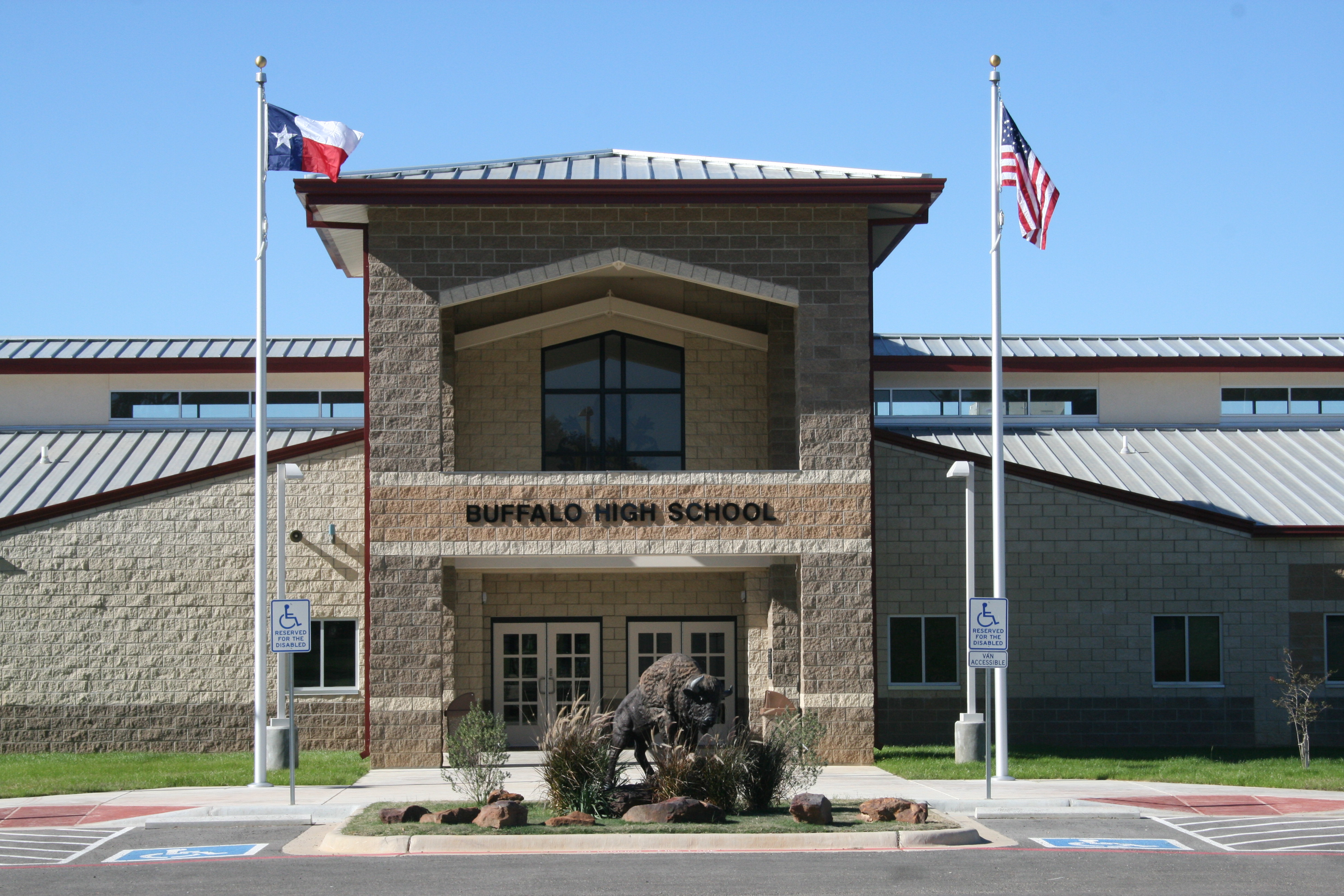

Location
- Buffalo, Leon County, Texas; United States

District information
- Type: Independent school district
- Motto: Our Children, Our Future
- Grades: PK–12
- Superintendent: Adam Ivy
- Schools: 4
- NCES District ID: 4811990

Students and staff
- Students: 1,027 (2023–2024)
- Faculty: Clayton Harris (high school principal); Jennifer Parnham (upper junior high principal); Sheila Ryder (lower junior high principal); Susan Shelton (elementary principal)
- Teachers: 83.74 (on an FTE basis) (2023–2024)
- Staff: 94.09 (on an FTE basis) (2023–2024)
- Student–teacher ratio: 12.26 (2023–2024)
- District mascot: Bucky the Bison
- Colors: Purple & Gold

Other information
- athletic conference: UIL (Conference 3A)
- Website: www.buffaloisd.net

Buffalo Independent School District is a public school district based in Buffalo, Texas, United States.

The district is located in northern Leon County and extends into southern Freestone County.

In 2010, the school district was rated "Recognized" by the Texas Education Agency.

== Schools ==
Buffalo High (Grades 9–12)

Buffalo High School is located 1724 N. Buffalo Ave. The current principal is John Clements. The construction for the new high school building finished in 2010, with spacious halls that resemble a college campus. There are four wings, each representing a different college. These four are the Texas A&M hall, which serves as the language hallway; the Texas Tech hall, which serves as the elective hallway; the University of Texas hall, which serves as the math and history hall; and the Baylor University hall, which serves as the science hall. The most noticeable add-on to the school is the gymnasium. The gymnasium is adjacent to the cafeteria which has a glass wall allowing one to look over the gym while eating and conversing. In 2010, the High School received an Academically Acceptable rating by the TEA.

Buffalo Junior Highs (Grades 3–8)

The Buffalo Junior High schools are located at 145 Bison Trail, the location of the former high school. The current of the upper junior high is Jennifer Parnham. The principal of the lower junior high is Sheila Ryder. The Lower Junior High has the 3rd through 5th graders, and the Upper Junior High has the 6th through 8th graders.

Buffalo Elementary (Grades PK-2)

Buffalo Elementary is located at 1700 E Commerce Street. The current principal is Susan Shelton. The Elementary consists of grades PK through 2. The Elementary has received a Recognized rating by the TEA four years in a row, from 2007 to 2010.

== School board ==
Buffalo High School's school board currently consists of Jack Helmcamp as president, John Rodell as vice president, Bobby Fishbeck as secretary, Bradley Ezell as an alternate, and Randy Ayres, Monty McGill, and Brent Ryder as members.

== Superintendents ==
The current superintendent at Buffalo High School is Adam Ivy, who has been serving since 2022. The superintendents before him were Lacy Freeman and Jackie Thomason (2005-2012), Charles Luke (2002-2005), Paul Vranish (2000-2002), and Floyd L. Jackson (1994-1999).

== Athletics ==
The girls basketball team won the state championship in 2002.

== Notable alumni ==
- Rebecca Robinson, 2002, Miss Teen Texas, Ms Texas 2009
