= Buffalo, Texas =

- City
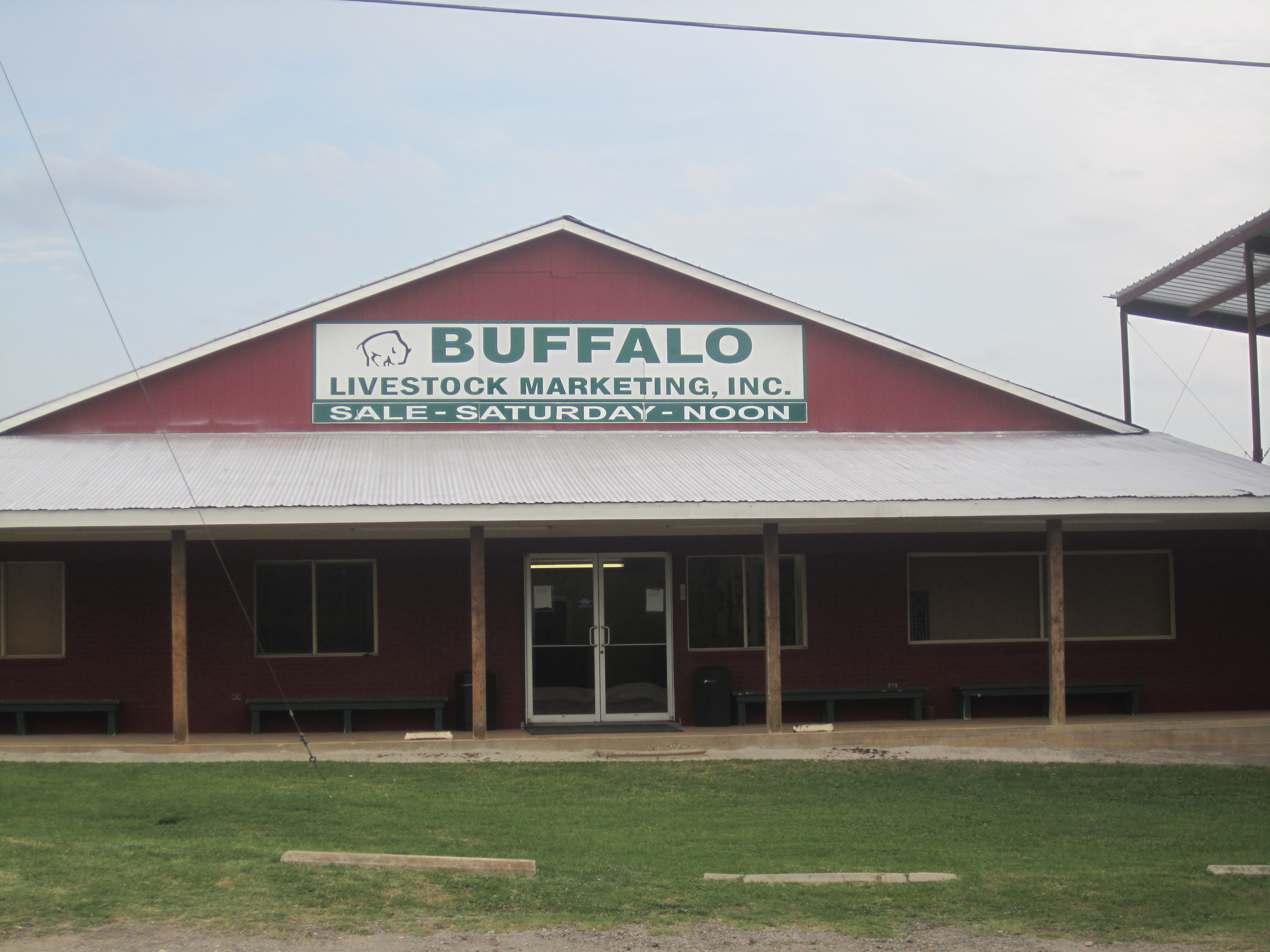
- Buffalo, Texas, Livestock Auction Barn
- Interactive map of Buffalo, Texas
- Coordinates: 31°27′36″N 96°03′58″W
- Country: United States
- State: Texas
- County: Leon

Area
  - Total: 4.73 sq mi (12.25 km^{2})
  - Land: 4.71 sq mi (12.20 km^{2})
  - Water: 0.019 sq mi (0.05 km^{2})
- Elevation: 377 ft (115 m)

Population (2020)
  - Total: 1,767
  - Density: 403.9/sq mi (155.93/km^{2})
- Time zone: UTC-6 (Central (CST))
  - Summer (DST): UTC-5 (CDT)
- ZIP code: 75831
- Area codes: 430/903
- FIPS code: 48-11116
- GNIS feature ID: 2409933
- Website: buffalotex.com

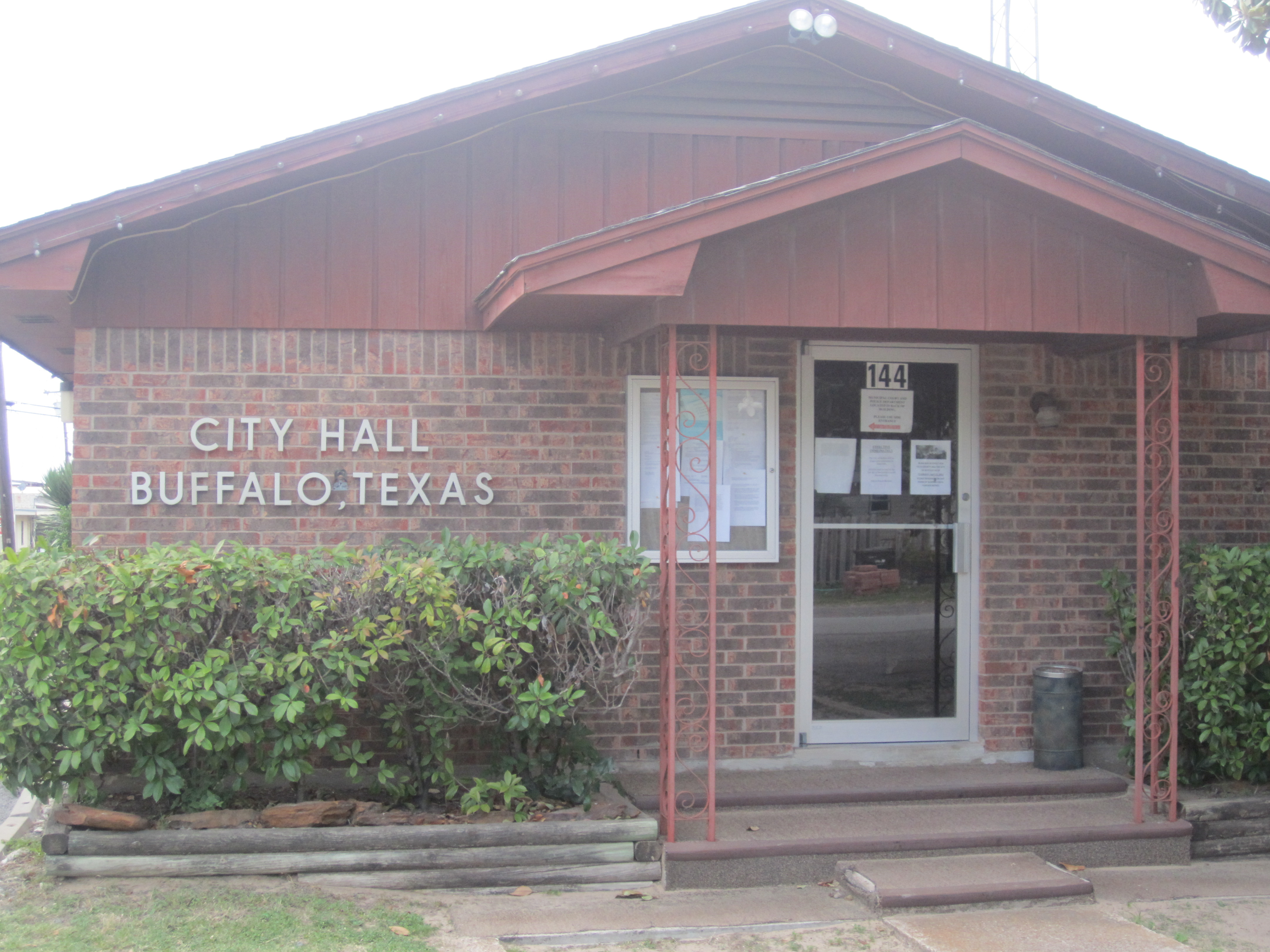
Buffalo City Hall

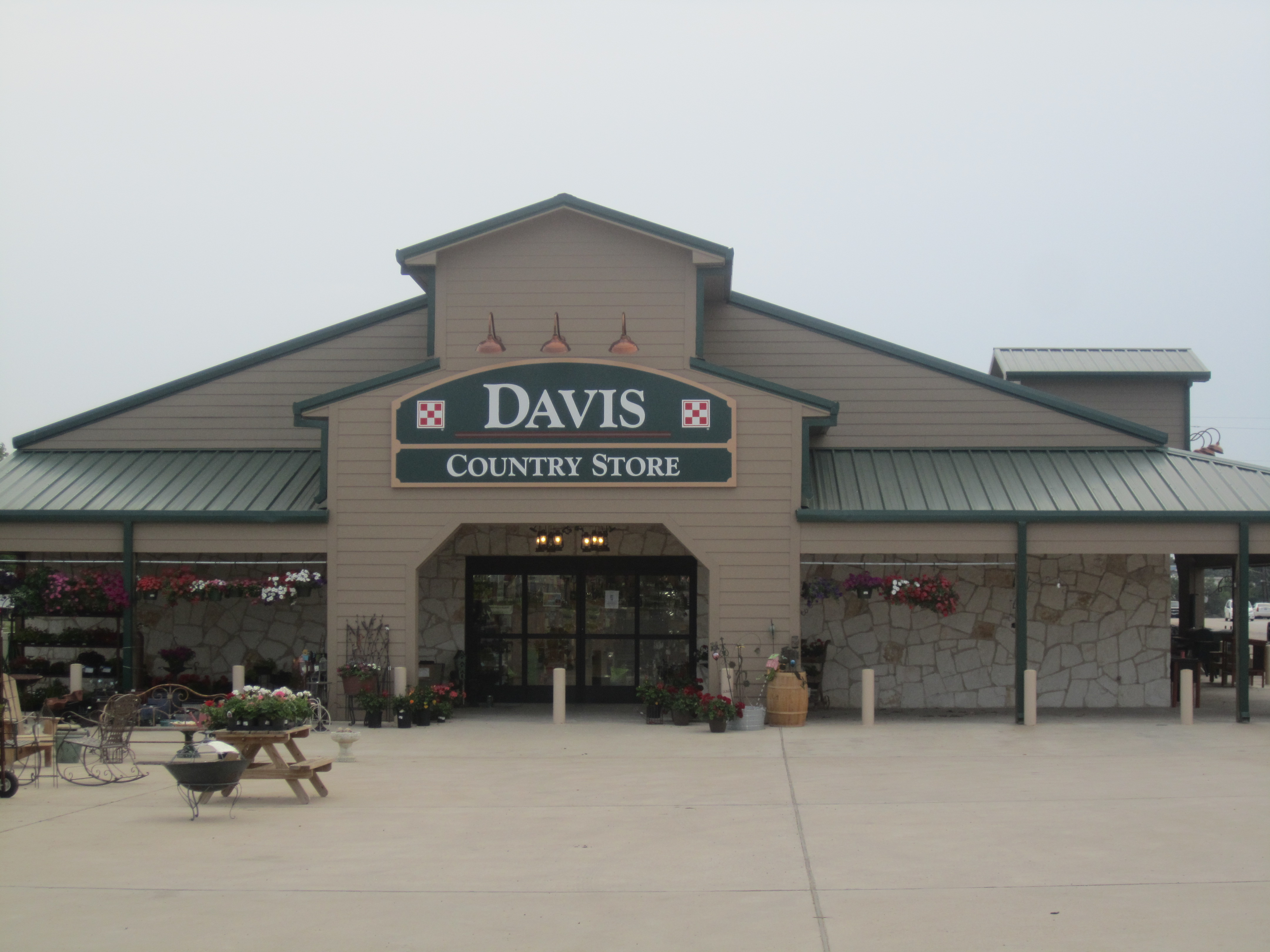
Davis Country Store off U.S. Route 79 in Buffalo

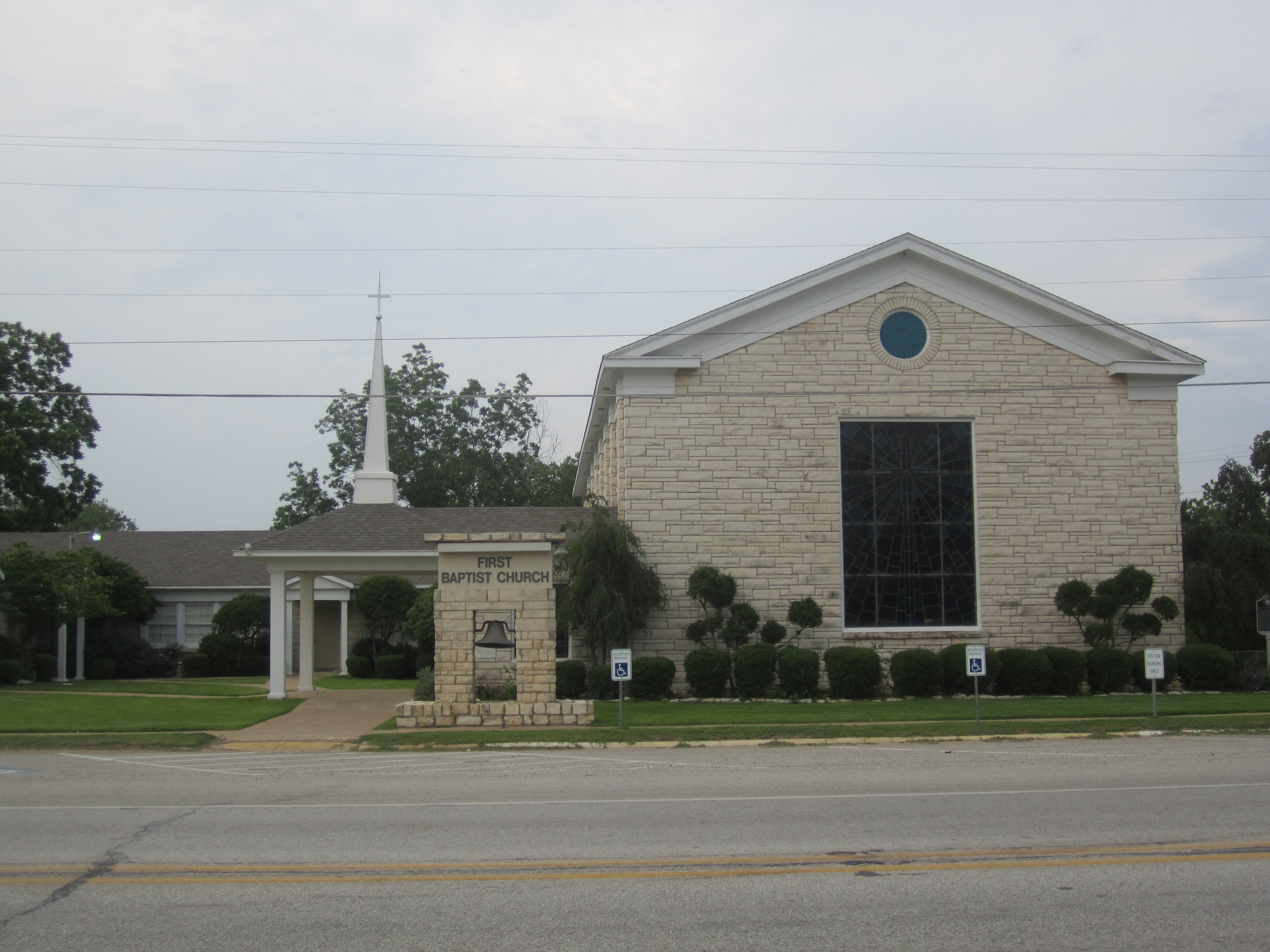
First Baptist Church of Buffalo

Buffalo is a city in Leon County, Texas, United States. The population was 1,767 at the 2020 census.

== Geography ==
According to the United States Census Bureau, the city has a total area of 4.0 square miles (10 km^{2}), of which 4.0 square miles (10 km^{2}) is land and 0.04 square miles (0.10 km^{2}) (0.50%) is water.

== Demographics ==
Historical population
Census	Pop.	Note	%±
1880	190		—
1920	510		—
1930	470		−7.8%
1940	737		56.8%
1950	970		31.6%
1960	1,108		14.2%
1970	1,242		12.1%
1980	1,507		21.3%
1990	1,555		3.2%
2000	1,804		16.0%
2010	1,856		2.9%
2020	1,767		−4.8%
U.S. Decennial Census

=== 2020 census ===
As of the 2020 census, Buffalo had a population of 1,767 people, 658 households, and 423 families residing in the city. The median age was 35.5 years, with 28.5% of residents under the age of 18 and 15.5% aged 65 or older. For every 100 females there were 97.0 males, and for every 100 females age 18 and over there were 89.2 males age 18 and over.

0% of residents lived in urban areas, while 100.0% lived in rural areas.

There were 658 households in Buffalo, of which 35.0% had children under the age of 18 living in them. Of all households, 45.4% were married-couple households, 17.2% were households with a male householder and no spouse or partner present, and 29.5% were households with a female householder and no spouse or partner present. About 26.9% of all households were made up of individuals and 12.9% had someone living alone who was 65 years of age or older.

There were 811 housing units, of which 18.9% were vacant. Among occupied housing units, 55.3% were owner-occupied and 44.7% were renter-occupied. The homeowner vacancy rate was 4.1% and the rental vacancy rate was 17.0%.

Buffalo racial composition as of 2020 (NH = Non-Hispanic) (Note: Note: the US Census treats Hispanic/Latino as an ethnic category. This table excludes Latinos from the racial categories and assigns them to a separate category. Hispanics/Latinos can be of any race.)
Race	Number	Percentage
White (NH)	841	47.59%
Black or African American (NH)	164	9.28%
Native American or Alaska Native (NH)	7	0.4%
Asian (NH)	25	1.41%
Pacific Islander (NH)	3	0.17%
Some Other Race (NH)	1	0.06%
Mixed/Multi-Racial (NH)	53	3.0%
Hispanic or Latino	673	38.09%
Total	1,767	

Racial composition as of the 2020 census
Race	Percent
White	55.0%
Black or African American	9.7%
American Indian and Alaska Native	0.6%
Asian	1.4%
Native Hawaiian and Other Pacific Islander	0.2%
Some other race	17.3%
Two or more races	15.9%
Hispanic or Latino (of any race)	38.1%

=== 2000 census ===
At the 2000 census there were 1,804 people in 668 households, including 474 families, in the city. The population density was 448.7 inhabitants per square mile (173.2/km^{2}). There were 815 housing units at an average density of 202.7 per square mile (78.3/km^{2}). The racial makeup of the city was 71.40% White, 14.80% African American, 0.06% Native American, 0.55% Asian, 11.59% from other races, and 1.61% from two or more races. Hispanic or Latino of any race were 17.02%.

Of the 668 households 37.6% had children under the age of 18 living with them, 47.5% were married couples living together, 18.4% had a female householder with no husband present, and 28.9% were non-families. 25.9% of households were one person and 12.0% were one person aged 65 or older. The average household size was 2.63 and the average family size was 3.16.

The age distribution was 29.8% under the age of 18, 10.5% from 18 to 24, 25.0% from 25 to 44, 21.1% from 45 to 64, and 13.6% 65 or older. The median age was 33 years. For every 100 females, there were 89.5 males. For every 100 females age 18 and over, there were 83.6 males.

The median household income was $25,625 and the median family income was $31,058. Males had a median income of $28,807 versus $17,083 for females. The per capita income for the city was $14,246. About 21.1% of families and 23.5% of the population were below the poverty line, including 31.3% of those under age 18 and 21.9% of those age 65 or over.

== Education ==
The City of Buffalo is served by the Buffalo Independent School District.

== Notable people ==
- Tom Araya, lead singer and bassist of Slayer
- Seth McKinney, former offensive lineman for the Buffalo Bills
- Steve McKinney, former offensive lineman for the Houston Texans, brother of Seth McKinney

== 1959 plane crash ==
Braniff Flight 542 crashed in Buffalo on September 29, 1959. It was en route to Dallas from Houston, and the crash resulted in the deaths of twenty-nine passengers and five crew members. The plane was an 11-day-old Lockheed L-188 Electra. The Civil Aeronautics Board blamed the crash on a "whirl-mode" prop theory.

== Climate ==
The climate in this area is characterized by hot, humid summers and generally mild to cool winters. According to the Köppen Climate Classification system, Buffalo has a humid subtropical climate, abbreviated "Cfa" on climate maps.
