= Braniff Airways Flight 542 =

1959 aviation accident

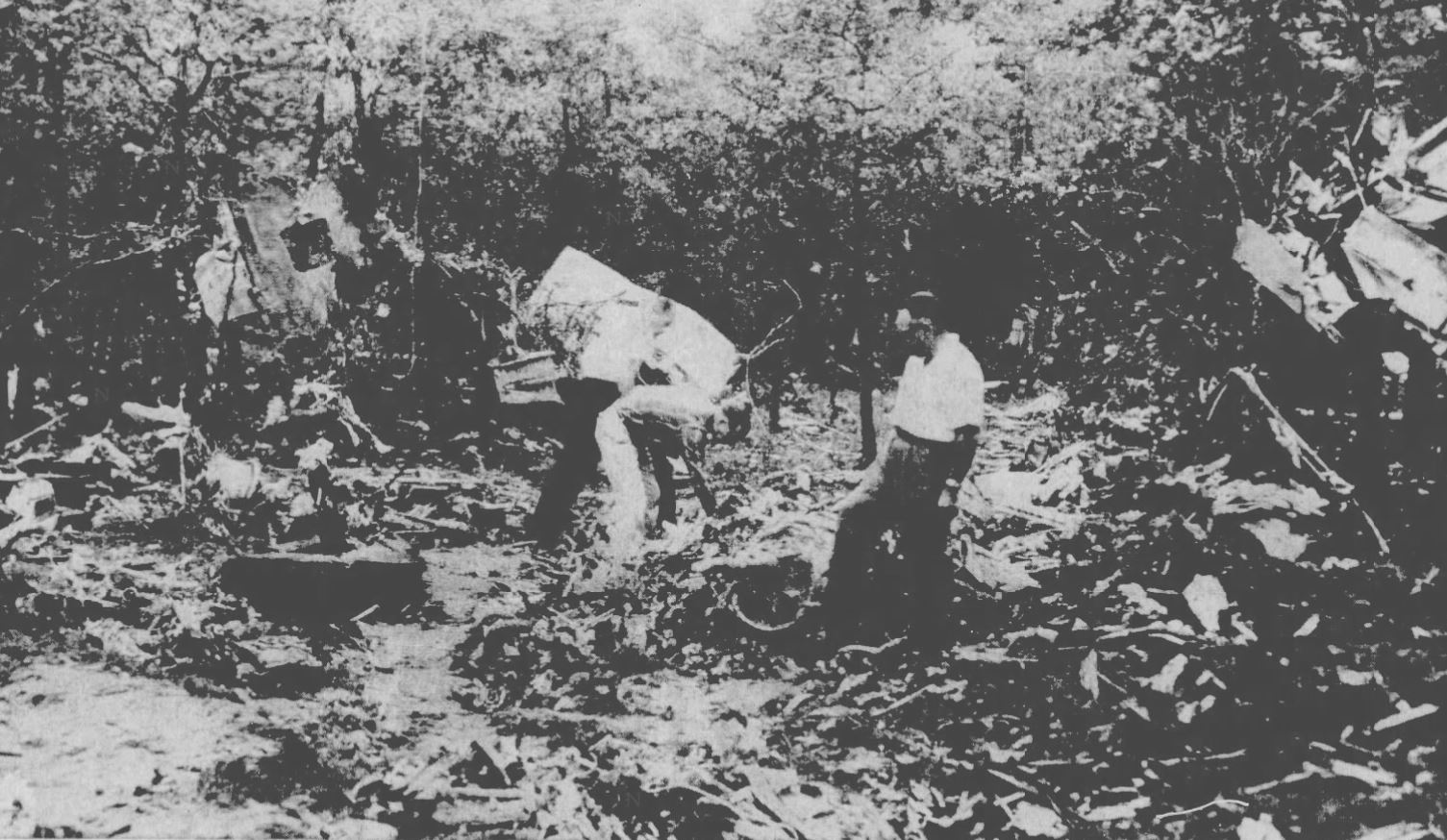
- Investigators probe the wreckage of Braniff Airways Flight 542

Accident
- Date: September 29, 1959
- Summary: In-flight breakup
- Site: Leon County, near Buffalo, Texas

Aircraft
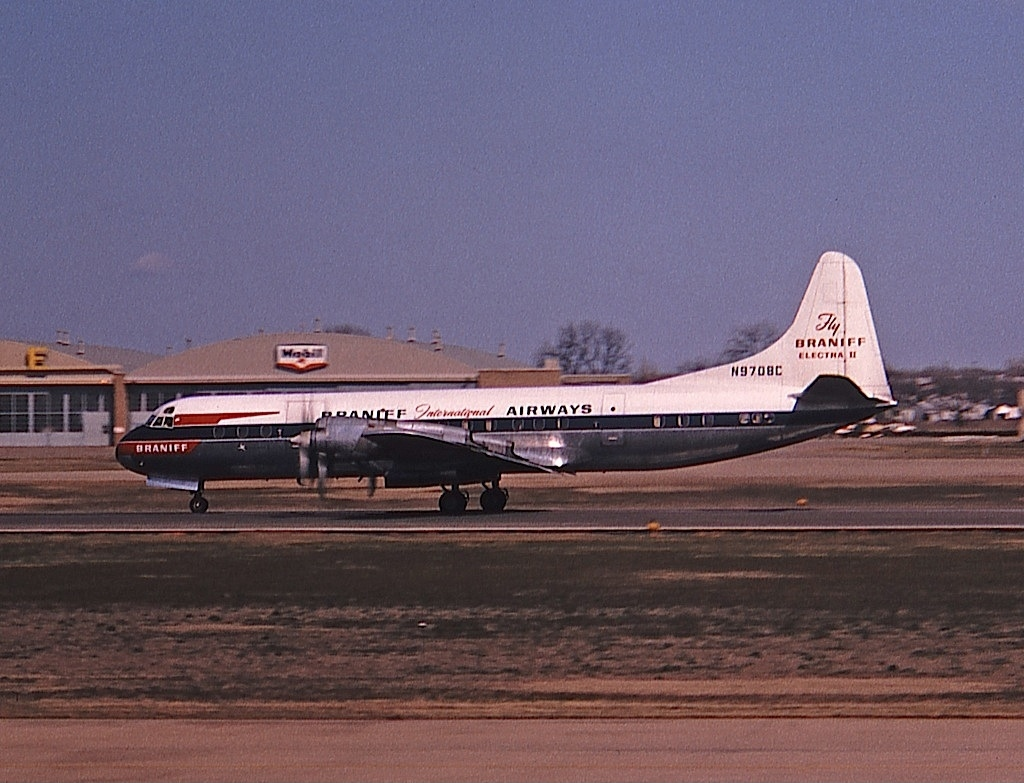
- An L-188 Electra similar to that involved in the accident. This later crashed as LANSA Flight 502.
- Aircraft type: Lockheed L-188A Electra
- Operator: Braniff Airways
- Registration: N9705C
- Flight origin: Houston International Airport, Houston, Texas
- 1st stopover: Dallas Love Field, Dallas, Texas
- Last stopover: Washington National Airport, Washington, D.C.
- Destination: Idlewild Airport, New York City
- Occupants: 34
- Passengers: 28
- Crew: 6
- Fatalities: 34
- Survivors: 0

Braniff Airways Flight 542 was a scheduled flight between Houston International Airport and Idlewild Airport in New York City. On September 29, 1959, while en route to a scheduled stop at Dallas Love Field, the Lockheed L-188 Electra operating the flight broke apart in mid-air without warning, about four miles (six kilometers) southeast of Buffalo, Texas. Eyewitnesses who saw the crash said they saw an explosion in the air, and then the aircraft plummeted to the ground. The left wing separated from the plane close to where it attaches to the fuselage and landed more than a mile (two kilometers) from the main crash site. The explosion and resulting crash left no survivors.

The aircraft was almost brand new, and had been in commercial service for only nine days after it was delivered from the factory. Crash investigators combed through the wreckage in search of the cause of the breakup, but after six months, they had still not determined what had caused the wing separation. As they were preparing to close the investigation without determining a probable cause, Northwest Airlines Flight 710 crashed near Cannelton, Indiana. That aircraft was a seven-month-old Lockheed Electra, and witnesses also described seeing it explode in flight before crashing to the ground. Investigators found that the entire right wing and portions of the left wing had broken off that aircraft while it was in flight.

The similarities between the two crashes led to the Federal Aviation Agency placing flight restrictions on the Electra until the cause of the two similar crashes could be identified. It ordered Lockheed Corporation to reevaluate the aircraft's structural integrity and prove its airworthiness. The subsequent investigation, involving over 250 engineers and technicians, found that when an Electra with damage to the mounting structures of one of the engines flew at high speeds or in turbulent conditions, a destructive phenomenon called "whirl mode wing flutter" could occur. The phenomenon caused the wing to flutter severely, causing the metal to fatigue and eventually snap. After discovering the cause of the wing failures, Lockheed launched a program to design structural changes to prevent whirl mode wing flutter and to retrofit all Electras already in service. The changes successfully resolved the issue, and modifications to the final aircraft were completed on July 5, 1961.

== Background ==
In 1959, Braniff Airways served 48 cities in 17 states across the United States. The previous year, it had carried more than two million passengers, and at the beginning of 1959 it operated a fleet of 66 piston-engine aircraft. That year, the company planned to put eight new L-188 Electra turboprop aircraft into service. Braniff had ordered nine of the new aircraft in 1955 as part of a $57 million (equivalent to $690 million in 2025) fleet expansion program. It received the first two aircraft on May 7, 1959, and placed them into service in mid-June. The first routes to use the Electra were flights from Texas to Chicago and from Texas to New York City.

Turbine-powered aircraft were a recent development in the aviation industry and were welcomed by the flying public. Turboprop flights attracted more passengers than comparable piston-powered flights because they were faster and smoother. Airlines operating the Electra promoted it as a faster and more powerful aircraft that would reduce flight times by an average of 20 percent compared with piston-engine aircraft. The Electra cruised approximately 100 miles per hour (87 kn; 160 km/h) faster than any other propeller-driven aircraft of its time. American Airlines, which began operating the Electra between New York and Chicago in January 1959, reported that 80 percent of the seats on its Electra flights were sold, 20 percent more than on its piston-engine flights. Eastern Airlines reported that sales on Electra flights were 10 to 15 percent higher than on comparable piston-aircraft flights.

Braniff operated Flight 542 as a regularly scheduled service from Houston International Airport to Idlewild Airport in New York City, with scheduled stops at Dallas Love Field and Washington National Airport. On September 29, 1959, the aircraft assigned to the flight was one of the airline's newest Electras. When it departed Houston, it carried 28 passengers and a crew of six, leaving the aircraft less than half full. Additional passengers were scheduled to board in Dallas for the next leg of the flight. Earlier that day, the aircraft had experienced problems with an engine-driven electrical generator. Repairs performed in Houston delayed Flight 542's departure by 22 minutes. The aircraft left the gate at 10:37 p.m., and took off at 10:44. The overnight flight was scheduled to arrive in New York City at 6:20 the following morning.

== Accident ==
At 11:05 p.m., the aircraft was flying at an altitude of 15,000 feet (4,600 m) east of Waco, Texas. Visibility was good, with scattered clouds below the aircraft at about 12,000 feet (3,700 m).The pilots contacted the San Antonio Air Route Traffic Control Center (ARTCC) to report their speed and altitude and to advise that they had crossed a planned waypoint over Leona, Texas. Controllers told them to contact the Fort Worth ARTCC for further clearance. Two minutes later, the pilots contacted Braniff Airways on a private frequency to report several mechanical issues that would require attention upon arrival in Dallas. The aircraft had problems with its propeller de-icing system and one engine had a malfunctioning fuel sump pump. Neither issue was considered a critical emergency, but Braniff's maintenance policies would have prevented the plane from leaving Dallas until the fuel pump issue was resolved.

When Flight 542 failed to check in with Fort Worth Center as instructed, the controllers attempted to contact the crew. After receiving no response, they continued trying to reach the flight for more than 30 minutes. Believing that the aircraft might have been experiencing radio problems, controllers kept air traffic clear of airports in Houston and Dallas in case the crew attempted to land without being able to communicate.

At 11:09 p.m., the aircraft broke apart in flight, producing flashes and fire seen by witnesses on the ground. Witnesses described seeing a blinding flash in the sky, followed by a loud clap of thunder and flaming objects falling for several seconds before the flames disappeared. One witness described hearing a series of explosions, sounding like "boom, boom, boom," while others believed the noise was a sonic boom caused by supersonic aircraft from nearby James Connally Air Force Base. An Air Force pilot said he initially thought the sound was that of an atomic bomb exploding. People as far as 100 miles (160 km) away reported seeing the explosion.

Over the next five minutes, debris and bodies fell from the sky. The wreckage was scattered across an area approximately two and a half miles (four kilometers) long and one mile (two kilometers) wide. The nose and the tail section came to rest within 100 yards (90 m) of each other and only 150 yards (140 m) from a farmhouse, whose occupants described the noise as "like a bulldozer falling out of the sky". Because the farmhouse did not have a telephone, one of the residents drove to the nearby town of Buffalo to notify authorities. There, he encountered a Texas Highway Patrol officer who had already been awakened by the noise. The officer called the regional office of the Texas Department of Public Safety in Waco to report that an aircraft had crashed before proceeding to the farm. By 1:00 a.m., eight men and five ambulances had arrived at the scene, and additional personnel arrived during the following hour.

The crash was the fifth fatal accident in Braniff's 31-year history and the first in which there were no survivors. The airline had one of the strongest safety records in the industry, and had received annual safe-operation awards from the National Safety Council. The accident was the second fatal crash involving the Lockheed Electra, which had entered commercial service less than a year earlier.

== Aftermath ==
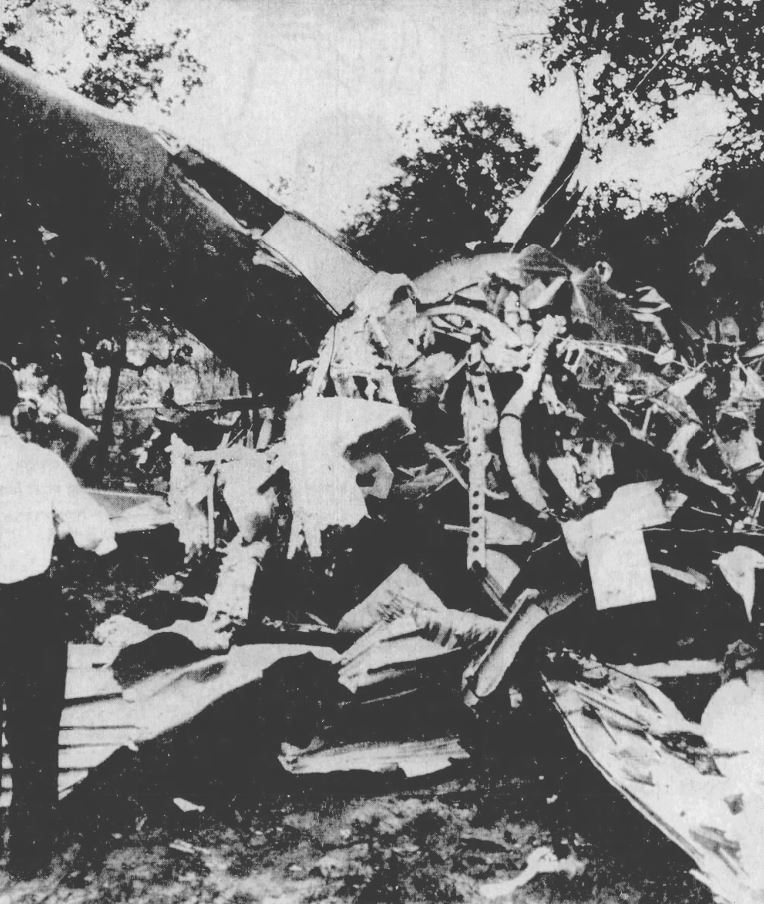
Twisted wreckage from the crash of Braniff Airways Flight 542

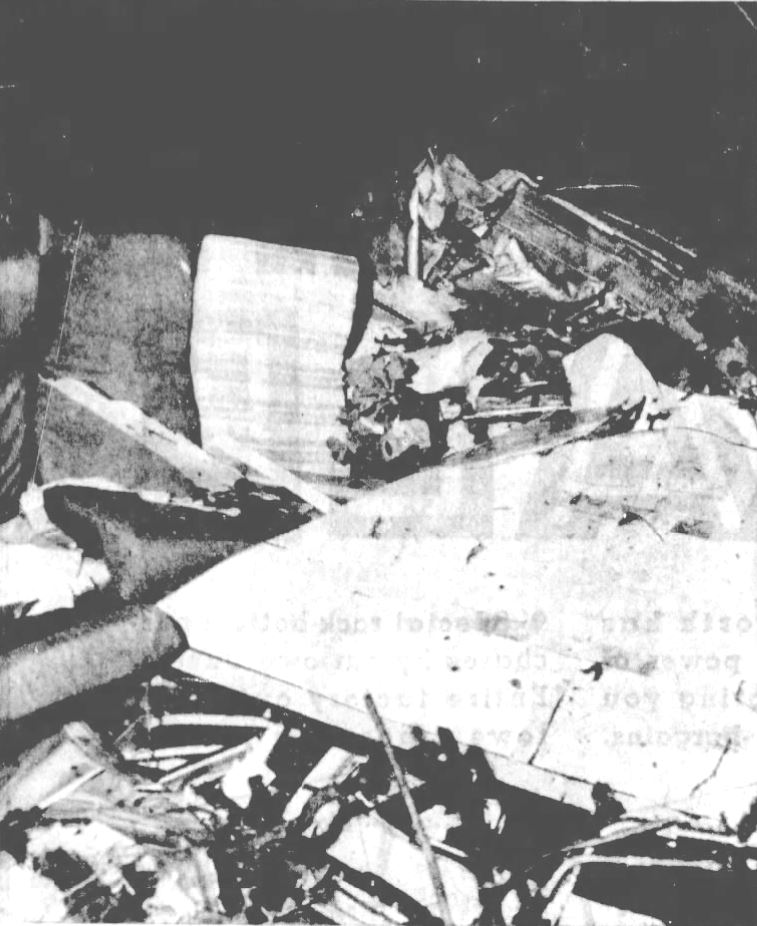
More wreckage at the scene of the crash

When first responders arrived at the scene, the aircraft appeared to have exploded before striking the ground. Debris was scattered across acres of dense woodland, and the main impact area covered approximately one thousand square yards (eight hundred forty square meters). Small pieces of the aircraft, personal belongings, and mail littered the ground and hung from trees throughout the area. The victims' bodies were scattered across the ground, in the underbrush, in treetops, and draped over fences. Most were mangled beyond recognition. Fuel was spread throughout the debris field. Most of the larger pieces of wreckage, including the center section of the fuselage, came to rest in a field about 75 yards (70 m) from the farmhouse. The nose section and part of the cabin were found in a crater about six feet (two meters) deep. The largest intact piece of the aircraft was a section of fuselage approximately 15 to 20 feet (5 to 6 m) long. About 90 percent of the forward section of the aircraft had broken into fragments smaller than two square feet (0.2 square meters). The pattern of damage to trees in the debris field indicated that the wreckage had fallen almost vertically from the air.

In the main wreckage area, the only fire on the ground was a small blaze where one of the engines had landed. Of the aircraft's four engines, this was the only one that was found near the main wreckage. Two additional small fires, located about a quarter of a mile (half a kilometer) from the farmhouse, marked the locations of another engine. Several passenger seats were found on the ground in good condition. The seat belts on those seats were unfastened when they were discovered, although investigators could not determine whether the seats had been occupied at the time of the accident.

Hundreds of rescue workers, reporters, and onlookers eventually arrived at the scene, but the Texas Highway Patrol turned away anyone who was not there on official business. More than 100 workers ultimately participated in the initial search for survivors and significant wreckage. The Texas Department of Public Safety closed the roads in the area in an effort to preserve the crash site for investigators. Officers inspected the vehicles of those who had assisted in the search to ensure that no one was leaving with items from the wreckage. Searchers recovered loose diamonds and a case of diamonds valued at more than $200,000 (equivalent to $2,200,000 in 2025) that had been transported aboard the aircraft. A postal investigator reported that 63 of the 65 mail sacks carried on the flight were found intact.

Human remains were taken to the gymnasium at Buffalo High School, where a temporary morgue was established. The first body was removed from the crash site at about 3:00 a.m., and by 8:00, twenty bodies had been recovered. None of the victims could be identified except through personal effects or scraps of clothing. Some remains were sufficiently intact to be recognizable as crash victims, but later recovery efforts involved the slow work of locating and collecting body parts that had been widely scattered and fragmented. Some remains had to be excavated from the ground where they had landed. An eight-member investigative team from the Department of Public Safety arrived in Buffalo at about 4:00 a.m. to examine personal belongings in an effort to identify the victims. A second team from the Federal Bureau of Investigation (FBI) arrived with fingerprint records for individuals whose names were similar to those on the passenger and crew manifest to assist in identifying the remains. The Washington office of the Federal Aviation Agency (FAA) dispatched two doctors to the scene to examine the victims. By the afternoon, investigators had transferred the remains from the high school to a mortuary in Fairfield, 19 miles (31 km) north of Buffalo.

By daybreak, searchers still had not located several major components of the aircraft, including two engines and most of the wings. On October 3, investigators brought in Air Force and Army helicopters to assist in locating additional wreckage.

== Aircraft ==
The aircraft involved in the accident was a Lockheed L-188A Electra, serial number 1090, and registered with tail number N9705C. Braniff Airways received the aircraft from the Lockheed factory on September 18, 1959, and it had accumulated 132 flight hours by the time of the accident. After completing an acceptance flight and three company test flights, Braniff placed it into service nine days before the crash. Purchased for $2,300,000 (equivalent to $25,400,000 in 2025), it was the fifth of nine Electras ordered by Braniff from Lockheed in late 1955.

On September 22, about a week before the accident, the aircraft was used for a routine training flight. During a stall-recovery exercise, the pilot undergoing training did not perform the recovery procedure correctly after an intentionally induced stall. As a result, the aircraft experienced significant buffeting before recovery was completed. During the investigation of Flight 542, the instructor who supervised the exercise stated that, although buffeting had been noticeable, he did not believe it had been severe enough to cause structural damage or to warrant a special structural inspection.

Before the accident, operators of the Lockheed Electra had reported problems with excessive vibration during flight, which was felt most strongly in the passenger seats aligned with the aircraft's four propellers. Lockheed inspected several affected aircraft and discovered small cracks in the wings near the engine nacelles. Although the cracks were not considered serious, the company responded by installing additional aluminum reinforcement plates on Electras already in service and on aircraft still on the assembly line. Lockheed also adjusted the engine mounting angle upward by approximately three degrees to resolve the vibration issue.

== Passengers and crew ==
The aircraft carried 28 passengers and six crew members, all of whom died in the crash. Most of the passengers were from the Dallas and Houston areas. The 34 victims included 26 men, six women, and two children.

The pilot in command was 47-year-old Wilson Elza Stone, of Dallas. He had flown for Braniff since 1939 and was a former flight instructor for the airline. At the time of the crash, he had flown a total of 20,726 hours, of which 68 hours were on the Electra. The first officer was 39-year-old Dan Hollowell. A native of Farmer City, Illinois, he lived in Euless, Texas. During World War II, he was an Army Air Forces pilot and had been a Braniff employee since 1948. His total recorded flying time was 11,316 hours, which included 95 hours in the Electra. The second officer was Roland Longhill, age 29. A resident of Dallas, he had been a Braniff employee since 1956 and had accumulated a total of 3,191 flying hours, including 83 hours in the Electra.

== Investigation ==
After receiving news of the crash, the Civil Aeronautics Board (CAB) immediately sent five accident investigators to the area, with more arriving over the following days. They were divided into five teams, each focusing on a separate aspect of the crash investigation. CAB representatives said that they expected the investigation at the crash site location to take two or three weeks and that the teams on the ground were focused on gathering information and evidence, and not trying to reach conclusions about what had caused the accident. Investigators meticulously identified every piece of debris and where it was found before it was moved, no matter how small it was, and each location was plotted on a map of the area. CAB officials restricted access to the Braniff offices in Dallas, not allowing reporters inside.

Shortly after the accident, a Braniff spokesperson described the aircraft as looking like it had been "blown open" in the air. He said there were signs that at least one section of the plane had buckled outward, like an explosion inside the plane had occurred. One unidentified investigator mentioned that the disintegration of the airliner could have been caused by an explosive loss of cabin air pressure from the aircraft. A CAB investigator cautioned about jumping to conclusions about explosions, telling reporters that so far, they hadn't even determined if the aircraft had been in one piece when it hit the ground. Investigators reported finding burn marks on some parts of the rear of the fuselage and tail, and the outside of some of the windows at the rear of the plane showed signs that they had been exposed to tremendous heat. Some pieces of the recovered fragments of the plane were sent to Washington, D.C., for further testing for traces of explosives, metal fatigue, overstress, and other causes. The FBI also began reviewing the details of the cargo that had been carried in the rear cargo hold. By October 1, an anonymous FAA official told reporters that they had ruled out the possibility of an explosive device causing the crash. He said that none of the bodies that had been recovered had any obvious signs of burns and did not have any odors that were consistent with explosives. Investigators also ruled out weather as a factor, saying the night was clear and calm.

On October 6, investigators, still unable to find all of the wreckage of the aircraft due to the thick brush and heavy rains, announced that a crew of 280 soldiers from Fort Hood would assist with the search for debris. The soldiers would walk in a line, spaced ten feet (three meters) apart. They would pick up everything they saw, even old litter, if there was a possibility that it had come from the aircraft. They covered an area two and a half miles (four kilometers) long and one mile (two kilometers) wide.

Meanwhile, rumors about the crash spread throughout the aviation community and in the news. A pilot for a foreign airline told colleagues that he had heard that a fighter plane had landed at a Texas Air Force base immediately after the crash with one of its Sidewinder heat-seeking missiles missing. The story was relayed to CAB officials in Dallas, who passed it on to investigators in Washington. The CAB asked the Air Force and Navy to perform a complete inspection of all of its aircraft to see if any of them were missing any missiles. The check was completed, with both services being able to account for all of their munitions, and the pilot's story was dismissed as a hoax. In another instance, newspapers reported that an engineer who had flown from Chicago to Houston on the same plane just before the crash told reporters that he had felt a bulge in the floor under his seat in the ninth row as the plane took off.

=== First public hearing ===
The CAB held a public hearing about the accident on October 21, 1959, in the Buffalo High School gymnasium. The CAB stated that the purpose of the hearings was only to discuss the progress of the investigation so far, and would not attempt to reach any conclusions as to the cause of the crash. A second set of public hearings was planned to be held about three or four weeks later in Dallas. About 100 people attended the hearing, including fifty experts from the CAB, Braniff Airlines, Lockheed, and the Allison Division of General Motors, eight eyewitnesses to the crash and explosion of the flight, and about forty spectators.

During the hearing, a representative of the CAB's Bureau of Safety testified that the destruction of the aircraft involved an in-flight disintegration, impact with the ground, and fire. An engineer from Braniff reported that when the aircraft departed Houston, it was in airworthy condition, although it had experienced various mechanical and electrical problems that whole day. He said that after the plane left Houston, the fuel scavenger pump in engine number three had broken down. That pump ensures that a steady flow of fuel is available to the main fuel pump, and is also used to help cool the plane's hydraulic system. The pump failure was considered a "no-go" malfunction, and after landing, company policy would not have allowed the plane to depart Dallas until it was repaired. The engineer also reported that there had been a recurring issue that day with a generator on engine number three, and that its most recent repair had been performed in Dallas before the flight to Houston. A Braniff engineering specialist had volunteered to ride on the plane on the return from Houston to Dallas to monitor and troubleshoot the generator problem, and was one of the victims of the crash. Other problems that had been troubling the aircraft that day included a malfunctioning propeller solenoid valve on the number three engine, caused by improper insulation on a terminal strip in the propeller mechanism, and a faulty light in the secondary refueling system. The pilot of Flight 542 had reported the problem with the fuel scavenger pump and the propeller solenoid valve over the radio to the company only two minutes before the crash. However, the engineer reported that none of the reported problems would have affected the aircraft's airworthiness or performance in any significant way.

Investigators presented signed statements by two Braniff crew members who had been on the flight immediately before the fatal one that said that the aircraft had seemed exceptionally noisy, and that the flight engineer had experienced problems keeping the propellers synchronized. This was echoed by the statements of several witnesses, who testified that the aircraft's engines sounded "funny" and that the engines or propellers sounded like they were out of synchronization.

One of the witnesses to the explosion, a former mechanical engineer for aircraft manufacturer Convair and former Air Force test pilot, testified that he had heard an extremely loud noise coming from the airliner as it flew, seconds before it exploded. He estimated the noise to be as loud as 150 to 175 decibels, loud enough to cause discomfort when he heard it, saying that it sounded like a "jet engine with the afterburner on." He said the noise stopped suddenly and then he saw the glow of an explosion. He saw the fire burn for ten to fifteen seconds, then it went out, and he heard the aircraft strike the ground about a minute later. Other witnesses to the crash also described the noise as extremely loud, using descriptions like "the clapping of two boards together", "the sound of thunder", and "the roar of a jet breaking the sound barrier". One farmer stated, "When the sound came, every coon dog for miles started howling." Investigators verified that statement with farmers around the area, and every one with a hound reported that the animal began howling shortly after 11:00 p.m.

The CAB had played twelve different known sounds to witnesses. The sounds included the sounds of jet aircraft, sonic booms, propellers spinning at supersonic speeds, and Electras in different flight configurations, such as normal flight, diving, and climbing. They also intentionally included noises that were completely unrelated to sounds that an aircraft would make. Without telling the witnesses what any of the sounds were, investigators asked them to pick out anything that was close to what they had heard. The witnesses chose two of the sounds; the sound of a propeller spinning at supersonic speed, and the sound of a jet aircraft.

John Leak, from the CAB's Bureau of Safety, testified that the left wing had broken off during the flight, about a foot or two from where it attached to the fuselage. That wing tore free and landed more than a mile (two kilometers) away from any other wreckage. Efforts to determine why the wing broke off were made more complicated by the fact that when the wing fell to the ground, it struck with the broken edge first, which further damaged the wing. He said that although the agency had not completely ruled out the possibility of a bomb on the airplane, they had not found any evidence of a bomb explosion on any of the aircraft debris or recovered luggage and cargo. Investigators had recovered the rear baggage compartment largely intact and it showed no sign of bomb damage.

=== Additional searches and rumors ===
After the initial examination of the wreckage did not reveal an obvious cause, CAB investigators said that they would assemble a partial two-dimensional reconstruction of the aircraft. With this type of reconstruction, analysts would draw a chalk outline of the aircraft's structure, and the recovered pieces would be laid out in their relative positions within the outline. The investigator expressed hope that this partial reconstruction would help identify the cause of the crash. On October 7, CAB officials stated that they would start transporting the recovered wreckage from the accident site to a warehouse in Dallas for reconstruction. The exact location of the warehouse was not disclosed to the public to keep curious onlookers away. By October 12, all of the recovered wreckage had arrived at the warehouse, and by October 15, investigators stated that they had been able to lay out about ninety percent of the structural components of the aircraft. About 50 engineers, CAB officials, FAA specialists, pilots, manufacturing representatives, and other experts were involved in the reassembly. On October 22, CAB officials said they would be taking some of the sections of the plane and performing a three-dimensional reassembly. The three-dimensional model used a wooden frame in the shape of the section, covered with mesh wire, to which each fragment of wreckage would be attached at the place where it actually was situated before the crash. The reconstruction work was interrupted by other aviation accidents which took several CAB experts away from Dallas, but resumed in late November.

After ruling out many possible theories about what had caused the crash, Lockheed and the CAB invited experts from other aircraft manufacturers to the Dallas warehouse to study the wreckage. Boeing, Convair, and NASA sent engineers to Dallas, who studied the material. They came up with new theories, but each theory was investigated and dismissed.

On December 9, officials announced that they would conduct a second search for missing pieces of debris, conducted by 280 soldiers from Fort Hood walking in a line, an arm's length from each other. They appealed to the public to turn over any "souvenir pieces" that they may have picked up from the area after the crash.

On January 17, 1960, the Fort Worth Star-Telegram reported that an anonymous source, later identified as a "CAB source", had told a reporter that investigators believed that a runaway propeller was the cause of the mid-air breakup. According to the report, they felt that the propeller on the right inboard engine had gone into a flat pitch, which means that the angle of the adjustable propeller blades changes so the propellers essentially present a flat face to the direction of the airflow. At the Electra's high speed, they thought that the air resistance against the propeller was enough to tear the engine and wing off the plane. A CAB spokesman refused to confirm or deny the report, saying only that several theories about the accident were still being considered, but later that day, a high official with the CAB denied the report, saying that no cause had been determined yet.

=== Second public hearing ===
The CAB held two days of public hearings in Dallas beginning on March 9, 1960, attended by about 150 people including government officials and representatives from the airline, aircraft manufacturers, and the Airline Pilots' Association. The CAB said the hearings would be the final public hearings that would be held on the technical phases of the inquiry. On the day before the meeting, the CAB held a private pre-hearing conference with representatives of the manufacturers and airlines, where a Board official admitted that the CAB was ready to give up trying to identify the cause. After objections from Braniff management and representatives from the Air Line Pilots Association, the CAB agreed to continue the probe.

At the public hearing, several witnesses gave additional background information about the aircraft and about the investigation. An engineering technician for the CAB Bureau of Safety testified that during the testing phase that occurred before its delivery to Braniff, the aircraft had not experienced any major malfunctions, and that the only problems that had been encountered were with the radio and navigation equipment. He said that in the last few flights before the accident, general malfunctions had occurred, but that they had all been corrected. He said that at the time of the crash, the aircraft had only been flown for 122 hours and 38 minutes. A project engineer for Braniff Airlines testified that the ground impact had damaged the aircraft's components so completely that only a few of the instruments had been recovered. A Lockheed engineer testified that they had looked into the possibility that a broken wire in part of the aircraft's autopilot had caused the plane to go out of control, but said that tests conclusively proved that a malfunction in the autopilot could not have caused the plane to break up the way it had.

Testimony at the hearing revealed that several theories about the accident had been eliminated by the investigators. One theory had been that an inboard engine had seized up in flight, causing it to explode and rip off the wing. Another was that a propeller blade had broken off of an inboard engine and been thrown into the cabin, causing an explosive decompression. A CAB engineer testified that the aircraft only started to break up after the left wing had already failed. As the plane started falling, the right wing also failed, and a small in-flight fire from spilling fuel caused the windows on the left side of the fuselage to crack. He stated that the fire was definitely caused by the wing failures; the fire did not cause the wing failures. He said that most of the fire damage to the aircraft only occurred after the impact with the ground. Fire damage was more consistent with a quick explosive fire, not a fire that burned for a considerable amount of time. A CAB power plant specialist testified that there was no evidence that any of the aircraft's engine components had failed during the flight, and said that the wing broke off the plane before any of the engines or propellers had been damaged.

Another theory that was identified as a possible cause was that excess pressure in one of the wing-mounted fuel tanks could have caused it to explode, leading to wing failure. A power plant engineer for Lockheed testified that under certain circumstances, it could have been possible for vapor pressure to increase inside the fuel tanks without the crew's knowledge. The aircraft was equipped with fuel tank pressure gauges, but they only registered pressures up to 50 pounds per square inch (3.4 bar), and emergency release valves would not have started to operate until the pressure reached 100 pounds per square inch (6.9 bar). The engineer testified that overfilling the fuel tanks could lead to excess pressure, and that an overfill valve that is designed to prevent overfilling the tanks was optional equipment that had not been purchased or installed on the crashed aircraft. However, a CAB engineer testified that there was no evidence that any of the fuel tanks had exploded.

Another potential cause that was being looked into was whether a removable truss and rib section could have been left out of one of the wings during its manufacture or maintenance. The condition of the wreckage made it impossible to tell if the section had been in place at the time of the crash. A representative for Lockheed testified that the wings of the Electra would have been able to withstand forces of up to 4.7 times the force of gravity that could have occurred in a dive. If the removable section was missing, the strength of the wing would have been decreased by a third. However, he said that Lockheed maintenance records showed that the removable section had been reinstalled in the aircraft.

The hearings concluded on March 10 without identifying any definitive cause for the accident. The board stated that it did not plan to hold any more public hearings, but that the investigation would continue, and estimated that it might be as long as another year before a final report would be issued. On March 17, the CAB was prepared to tell Braniff that it could release the wreckage in the warehouse to its insurance underwriters, a sign that they had discovered everything that they hoped to find from the wreckage and that the investigation was winding down after six months of intense efforts.

== Northwest Airlines crash ==
On March 17, 1960, a week after the conclusion of the CAB's second public hearings in Dallas, Northwest Airlines Flight 710, a scheduled flight between Minneapolis and Miami with a scheduled stop at Chicago, crashed near Tell City, Indiana, killing all 63 people on board. The aircraft was a seven-month-old Lockheed L-188 Electra, and witnesses to that accident described seeing the aircraft explode in flight, then crash to the ground nose-first at a nearly 90-degree angle and a speed of at least 600 miles per hour (520 kn; 970 km/h). An initial examination of the wreckage revealed that the entire right wing and portions of the left wing had broken off the aircraft while it was in flight.

== Whirl mode wing flutter ==
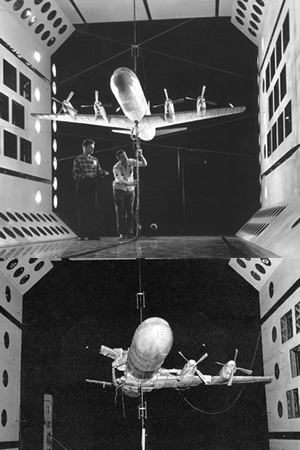
Testing a one-eighth scale model of a Lockheed Electra in NASA's Transonic Dynamics wind tunnel at the Langley Research Center

After the Northwest Airlines crash, the FAA issued flight restrictions on the Electras until the cause of the crashes could be determined. Despite pressure from politicians and the CAB to ground the aircraft until the cause could be identified, the FAA allowed airlines to continue to operate the aircraft under new speed limits and operating restrictions while the investigation continued. The FAA required the operators of Electras to immediately perform a series of tests and inspections on all of the Electras in their fleets to verify their structural integrity. It also ordered Lockheed to answer questions about the airworthiness of the Electra, and to perform a reevaluation of the aircraft's structural strength.

Over eight weeks, Lockheed conducted an investigation involving 250 engineers and technicians to perform a series of tests on the Electra to determine the cause of the failures. The company performed flight tests involving a highly instrumented Electra in areas of severe turbulence where test pilots performed violent maneuvers to measure the effects on the aircraft. Engineers performed mechanical tests on the ground involving a complete aircraft to measure the effects of vibration and stress on key structures, and performed destructive testing on a wing taken from the factory's production line. They constructed a one-eighth scale model of the Electra and tested it in the Transonic Dynamics Tunnel at NASA's Langley Research Center.

The engineers discovered that when an Electra with damage to the mounting structures of one of the outboard engines flew at high speeds or in areas of turbulence, destructive whirl mode wing flutter could occur, leading to wing failure. "Wing flutter" is a rapid, self-sustaining oscillation of an aircraft's wings, typically triggered by factors such as aerodynamic disturbances from turbulence or operation at high airspeeds. The Electra was designed and tested to be highly resistant to wing flutter, and able to rapidly dampen it when it occurred. "Whirl mode" refers to the gyroscopic effect of an aircraft's propeller, which is ordinarily very stable within its plane of rotation and is one of the mechanisms the aircraft uses to help dampen wing flutter. When a strong external force acts to push a propeller out of its plane of rotation, it will begin to wobble, similar to how a spinning top will wobble when it is knocked. In an aircraft. that external force could be from strong air turbulence or from a sudden change in the plane's direction. Ordinarily, the aircraft's engine mounts are designed to help absorb the forces caused by the wobble and return the propeller to a stable plane. However, when there was damage to the Electra's engine mounting structure, its ability to absorb the energy of the wobble became greatly reduced, and the wobble could then cause further damage to the mounting structure. This cycle continued until the wobble became severe enough that it transferred some energy of the wobble to the wing, leading to wing flutter. This is called "whirl mode wing flutter", and as the engine mount became more and more damaged and weakened by the forces of the wobble, more and more energy was transferred to the wing. Eventually the forces of the induced wing flutter became greater than the wing was designed to withstand, and the structural components of the wing failed.

== Accident report ==
The CAB released the final accident report on May 5, 1961. It said that the aircraft had suffered an in-flight breakup into a number of major sections, including the propeller and gearbox from the left outboard engine; the left wing containing the remaining parts of the outboard engine and the entire inboard engine; the right outboard engine; the end of the left stabilizer; the outer portions of the right wing; and the remaining fuselage and empennage with the right inboard engine and the inner portion of the right wing. The left wing struck the ground first and the fuel in the wing fuel tank triggered an intense ground fire. The point where the wing break occurred was located between the inboard engine and the fuselage. The report made note of the fact that a great deal of effort had been made to verify the working condition of the engines at the time of the crash, and that the investigators could not find any sign of failure of malfunction in the engines prior to the start of the separation from the wing. It said that it was evident that the aircraft broke up quickly and with little warning due to the fact that only one of the seats was found with the safety belt fastened, suggesting that there had been no time to order passengers to fasten them. The report concluded that the investigation was not able to determine a positive indication of the cause of the breakup, but through a process of elimination of other factors, the evidence supported the conclusion that whirl mode wing flutter had caused the crash.

== LEAP ==
After discovering the whirl mode wing flutter issue, Lockheed's engineers were faced with the task of determining what modifications needed to be made to each aircraft for it to be able to withstand the conditions that caused the condition. The Lockheed Electra Action Program, or LEAP, was what the company named the process to reexamine the original aircraft engineering data, find a way to resolve the problem, and apply the necessary repairs to all Electras in service.

The company's engineers redesigned the engine mounts, nacelles and cowlings, and modified the wings of the Electra to increase their strength. The Allison Engine Company redesigned how the gear box of the engines attach to the engine struts. The combined modifications added an additional 1,400 pounds (640 kg) of metal to the aircraft. Performed at a cost to Lockheed of $25 million (equivalent to $270 million in 2025), the modifications received an interim approval from the FAA in late 1960, and a final recertification on December 30, 1960, allowing aircraft that had received the modifications to resume flight at full speed.

The aircraft modification process took place at Lockheed's factory in Burbank, California, in a process that worked on nine aircraft simultaneously over the course of twenty days. Lockheed worked with the airlines to arrange the schedule for each of the repairs, working around each company's holidays, busy periods, and other schedule restrictions. By April, Lockheed had applied the modifications to nearly half of the 165 Electras in airline service around the world. The final Electra to be completed was returned to Ansett-ANA on July 5, 1961.

== Rebuilding confidence ==
The reputation of the Electra had suffered greatly during the period between the Northwest Airlines crash and the FAA approval of the Electra modifications, and after the discovery of the whirl mode wing flutter issue, the airlines launched a program to restore the public's trust in the aircraft. In addition to the Braniff and Northwest crashes, two more Electras had crashed during 1960, although neither involved a structural failure of the aircraft. On September 14, 1960, American Airlines Flight 361 crashed during a landing at LaGuardia airport when the aircraft struck a runway dike and flipped over with no fatalities, and on October 4, 1960, 62 people died when Eastern Air Lines Flight 375 crashed during takeoff from Boston's Logan Airport after striking a flock of starlings, leading to engine failure. To counteract negative public perceptions of the Electra, American Airlines sent out what it called "truth squads" or "fact teams". Beginning in November 1960, these teams of pilots, engineers, and public relations staffers traveled from city to city holding news conferences and meeting with politicians and civic groups. They explained the concepts of whirl mode and flutter, outlined the investigation, and described the aircraft redesigns that would resolve the problems. They mentioned the accidents in New York and Boston, and explained that those accidents could have happened with any aircraft, and then opened the meetings to any questions. In two months, the five teams repeated this in 18 of the 26 cities that were being served by Electras. In New York, Chicago, and Washington, D.C., American Airlines offered thirty-minute sight seeing flights in an Electra for $6.50. The flights ended up being so popular that American expanded the program to Boston, Nashville, Syracuse, Buffalo, Detroit, Hartford, and Philadelphia.

After the modifications, airlines once again started promoting the fact that they offered service on Electras, and made up new names for the modified versions. Some called their modified aircraft the "Electra II". Others called it the "Super Electra" or the "Mark II". By the end of September 1961, American Airlines reported that its load factors on Electras were even higher than they were on pure jets. At Northwest Airlines, load factors on the Electra were higher than almost every type of aircraft the company flew. At Western Airlines, load factors in August had risen to sixty two percent, from a low of 49 percent. At Braniff Airlines, load factors in Fall 1961 matched the loads on their Boeing 707 fleet, which was a fifty percent increase over Spring 1960. The popularity of Electra flights at Eastern Airlines and National Airlines also recovered. In 1964, the two major vice presidential candidates for the 1964 United States presidential election used chartered Electras on their campaign.

Lockheed ended the production of the L-188 Electra in 1961. The company lost $53 million (equivalent to $570 million in 2025) on the Electra project, with only 170 aircraft ever built. This was due to a number of factors, including the arrival of faster, more competitive pure jet aircraft like the Boeing 707 and Boeing 727. However, the Lockheed P-3 Orion, which was based on the L-188 Electra and designed as an antisubmarine and patrol aircraft for the US Navy, was very successful for the company, and more than 700 aircraft across sixteen variants were produced over thirty years.

Nearly every airline that operated the Electra described it as the most reliable, economical, and efficient aircraft type in its fleet, even surpassing pure jets in some routes. On short flights, the pure jets did not have any speed advantage over the Electra, but used far more fuel. In 1964, there were 165 Electras in commercial service at 14 airlines. As early as 1963, companies attempting to purchase new Electras on the second-hand market were being forced to pay prices that were nearly as high as the $2.5 million (equivalent to $26 million in 2025) cost the aircraft had sold for brand new. At least three airlines had standing orders to purchase Electras from other carriers as soon as they were ready to retire them, and one airline turned down an offer of $2 million (equivalent to $21 million in 2025) for one of its used Electras.

== Legacy ==
In 1964, the FAA amended its aircraft design regulations relating to an aircraft's resistance to flutter, deformation, and vibration to require consideration of the effects of a change in the angle of the propeller. The rule change also required aircraft designs to consider what impact a failure of other structural components would have on the amount of vibration experienced by the aircraft. Another rule change more clearly defined the speeds at which an aircraft was required to be free from flutter. The Electra accidents led to designers and regulators taking a closer look at the various ways an aircraft structure can fail, resulting in a more thorough approach being developed to ensure that planes in service remain structurally sound. This included a system of regular, carefully managed inspections to catch damage, whether from manufacturing flaws, damage, fatigue, or environmental effects such as corrosion, before the damage weakens the structure enough to lead to failure.
