= Indiana State Road 145 =

State highway in Indiana, United States

State Road 145
- SR 145 highlighted in red

Route information
- Maintained by INDOT
- Length: 45.458 mi (73.158 km)
- Existed: 1931–present

Major junctions
- South end: SR 37 near Tell City
- I-64 at Kitterman Corners
- North end: SR 56 at French Lick

Location
- Country: United States
- State: Indiana
- Counties: Perry, Crawford, Orange, Dubois

Highway system
- Indiana State Highway System; Interstate; US; State; Scenic
← SR 144	→ SR 148

State Road 145 is a north–south road in the southwest portion of the U.S. state of Indiana.

== Route description ==
State Road 145 begins at State Road 37 about 8 miles (13 km) to the northeast of Tell City, near the Perry County Municipal Airport. It runs north through the small towns of Bristow and Sassafras, and intersects Interstate 64 at exit 72 at Kitterman Corners. At Birdseye, it meets State Road 64 and is concurrent with that road for 4.35 miles (7.00 km) as it heads east to the Hoosier National Forest. It then strikes north again through the forest and across Patoka Lake, and terminates in French Lick at State Road 56.

== Major intersections ==
County	Location	mi	km	Destinations	Notes
Perry	Anderson Township	0.000	0.000	SR 37 – Tell City, English	Southern terminus of SR 145
Perry	Clark Township	17.354	27.929	SR 62 – Dale, Corydon	
Perry	Clark Township	17.448– 17.635	28.080– 28.381	I-64 – Evansville, St. Louis, Louisville	Exit number 79 on I-64
Dubois	Birdseye	24.769	39.862	SR 64 west – Huntingburg	Western end of SR 64 concurrency
Crawford	Patoka Township	29.152	46.916	SR 64 east – English	Eastern end of SR 64 concurrency
Crawford	Patoka Township	31.813	51.198	SR 164 west – Jasper	Eastern terminus of SR 164
Orange	French Lick	45.458	73.158	SR 56 – Jasper, Paoli	Northern terminus of SR 145
1.000 mi = 1.609 km; 1.000 km = 0.621 mi: Concurrency terminus
