= Indiana State Road 166 =

State highway in Indiana, United States

State Road 166
- SR 166 highlighted in red

Route information
- Maintained by INDOT
- Length: 6.360 mi (10.235 km)

Major junctions
- South end: Tobinsport
- North end: SR 66 near Cannelton

Location
- Country: United States
- State: Indiana
- Counties: Perry

Highway system
- Indiana State Highway System; Interstate; US; State; Scenic
← SR 165	→ SR 167

State Road 166 in the U.S. state of Indiana is a short highway in southern Perry County. Though it has an even number, in practice it is a north–south highway for most of its length.

== Route description ==
State Road 166 begins at the banks of the Ohio River just south of the small town of Tobinsport. Leaving the town, it heads straight north until the river bends to the west, at which point the road also bends to the west and hugs the banks of the river for a mile or so until it reaches State Road 66.

The highway is narrower than most state-maintained highways, and during times of high water levels on the Ohio River, it is often closed. The road surface is rough and undulating in places, this being caused by it being submerged for a prolonged period of time during the 1997 Ohio River Flood.

== History ==
Until sometime in the 1950s, Route 166 previously connected with Kentucky Route 105 via a ferryboat across the Ohio River to and from downtown Cloverport, in northwestern Breckinridge County, Kentucky. Ferry service was since discontinued.

== Major intersections ==
The entire route is in Tobin Township, Perry County.

mi	km	Destinations	Notes
0.000	0.000	Dead end	Southern terminus of SR 166
6.360	10.235	SR 66 – Tell City, Derby	Northern terminus of SR 166
1.000 mi = 1.609 km; 1.000 km = 0.621 mi
