= Sassafras (disambiguation) =

Sassafras is a genus of three species of trees native to North America and Asia.

Sassafras may also refer to:

== Plants ==
- Atherospermataceae, or Southern Sassafras, a southern hemisphere family of trees
- Doryphora sassafras, an Australian tree from temperate rainforests
- Sassafras albidum, the sassafras tree of eastern North America, used in tea, root beer, and gumbo filé powder
- Cinnamomum oliveri, known as black sassafras or Oliver's sassafras, an Australian rain forest laurel
- Street slang for Marijuana

== Vessels ==
- USCGC Sassafras (WLB-401), United States Coast Guard buoy tender

== Places ==
- Sassafras, New South Wales, a village in New South Wales, Australia
- Sassafras, Tasmania, a town in northern Tasmania, Australia
- Sassafras, Victoria, a city suburb of Melbourne, Victoria, Australia
- Sassafras, Indiana, an unincorporated community
- Sassafras, Maryland, a location in the United States
- Sassafras, West Virginia, an unincorporated community
- Sassafras River, a tributary of the Chesapeake Bay in Maryland and Delaware, United States
- Sassafras Mountain, the highest point in the state of South Carolina, United States

== Music ==
- Sassafras (band), a rock band from South Wales formed in the 1970s
- Sassafrass!, a 2018 album by Tami Neilson
- "Sassafras", a song by The Devil Wears Prada from With Roots Above and Branches Below
- "Sassafras", a song by the Helio Sequence which appears on Com Plex
- "Sassafras Roots", a song by Green Day from Dookie
- "Sassafras", a song by Billy Edd Wheeler covered by Van Dyke Parks on Songs Cycled

== Animals ==
- Sassafras (horse) (1967–1988), a racehorse
