= Northwest Airlines Flight 710 =

1960 aviation accident in Indiana, US

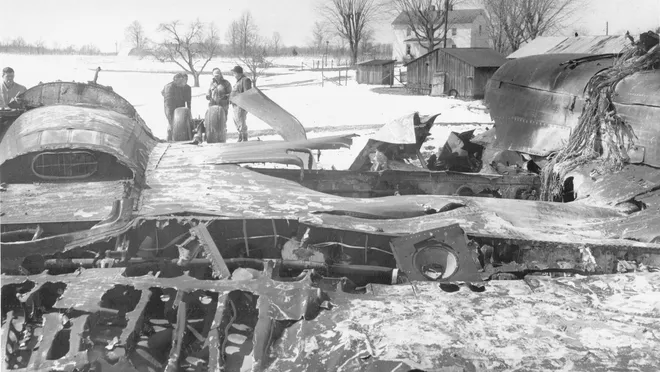
- The right wing of the aircraft, found about two miles from main impact point

Accident
- Date: 17 March 1960
- Summary: In-flight breakup
- Site: Tobin Township, Perry County, near Cannelton, Indiana, United States; 37°54′39.62″N 86°37′58.83″W

Aircraft
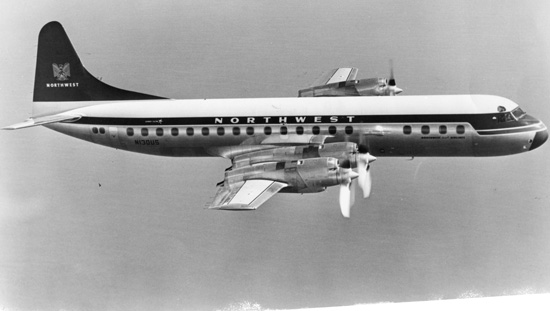
- A Northwest Airlines Lockheed L-188 Electra, similar to the one involved
- Aircraft type: Lockheed L-188C Electra
- Operator: Northwest Airlines
- Registration: N121US
- Flight origin: Wold-Chamberlain Airport, Minneapolis, Minnesota
- 1st stopover: Chicago Midway Airport, Chicago, Illinois
- Destination: Miami International Airport, Miami, Florida
- Occupants: 63
- Passengers: 57
- Crew: 6
- Fatalities: 63
- Survivors: 0

Northwest Airlines Flight 710 was a scheduled flight between Minneapolis, Minnesota and Miami, Florida, with a stop in Chicago. On March 17, 1960, the six-month-old Lockheed L-188 Electra operating the flight broke up in midair in southern Indiana, near Cannelton, killing all 63 people on board. After unexpectedly encountering clear-air turbulence at 18,000 feet (5,500 m), the aircraft's right wing and part of the left wing separated, causing the fuselage to plummet and impact the ground at a nearly 90-degree angle, leaving a deep crater. Portions of the wings landed up to four miles (six kilometers) away.

The in-flight breakup of the Electra closely resembled the September 1959 crash of Braniff International Airways Flight 542 near Buffalo, Texas, which killed all 34 occupants. That flight was also operated by a nearly new Electra. In that crash, the left wing separated and landed about one mile (two kilometers) from the main wreckage. Investigators were unable to determine the cause at the time, but the similarities between the two crashes led the Federal Aviation Agency to place flight restrictions on the Electra pending identification of the cause, and to order Lockheed to reevaluate the aircraft's structural integrity and demonstrate its airworthiness. The subsequent investigation, involving more than 250 engineers and technicians, determined that when an Electra with damage to the mounting structures of one of its outboard engines operated at high speeds or in turbulence, a destructive phenomenon called whirl mode wing flutter could occur, leading to wing failure.

After identifying the cause of the failures, Lockheed launched a program to design structural modifications to prevent whirl mode wing flutter and to retrofit all Electras already in service. These changes proved effective, and modifications to the fleet were completed on July 5, 1961.

== Background ==
Northwest Airlines Flight 710 was a regularly scheduled flight between Minneapolis, Minnesota, and Miami, Florida, with a scheduled stop in Chicago. On March 17, 1960, the flight was operated by a Lockheed L-188C Electra aircraft. At 12:51 p.m. Central Standard Time, the flight left Wold-Chamberlain Airport in Minneapolis with 69 passengers. It arrived at Midway Airport in Chicago after an uneventful flight, and 51 of the passengers departed the plane. Another 39 new passengers boarded while the crew prepared for the flight to Miami and the ground crew refueled the aircraft. Flight 710 took off from Midway Airport at 2:38 p.m. with 57 passengers and a crew of 6.

At 3:13 p.m., as the flight passed a navigational waypoint at Scotland, Indiana, the crew made a routine report to the Indianapolis Air Route Traffic Control (ARTC) Center with the aircraft's position and altitude at 18,000 feet (5,500 m). The crew estimated that the flight would reach its next check point at Bowling Green, Kentucky, in twenty minutes, and reported that the flight was proceeding normally. Indianapolis controllers told them to contact the Memphis, Tennessee, ARTC in fifteen minutes on that center's radio frequency.

In the area, the weather at the plane's altitude was clear, with unrestricted visibility. Below it, there were two layers of broken to overcast clouds; cloud tops in the upper layer extended up to 5,000 to 6,000 feet (1,500 to 1,800 m) altitude. An area of low pressure centered over the Lower Peninsula of Michigan and a low pressure trough extended southward along the Illinois-Indiana border. At the same time, a ridge of high pressure extended from the southern plains to the northeast, from Arkansas, through central Kentucky and into southern Ohio.

A different Electra flight that had passed through the same area at 2:30 p.m. that day reported that it had encountered severe airspeed fluctuations and turbulence in the area. Two U.S. Air Force B-57s operating near Louisville, Kentucky, reported moderate to severe clear-air turbulence in the area at high altitudes between 3:00 and 3:30, with one of them slowing down and descending from between 20,000 and 25,000 feet to 15,000 feet to escape the turbulence. A DC-7 passing through the area reported severe clear-air turbulence at 19,000 feet. Before leaving Chicago, the pilots of Flight 710 had been informed about the weather conditions in the area, but the weather reports did not mention anything about clear-air turbulence along the flight's path.

== Accident ==
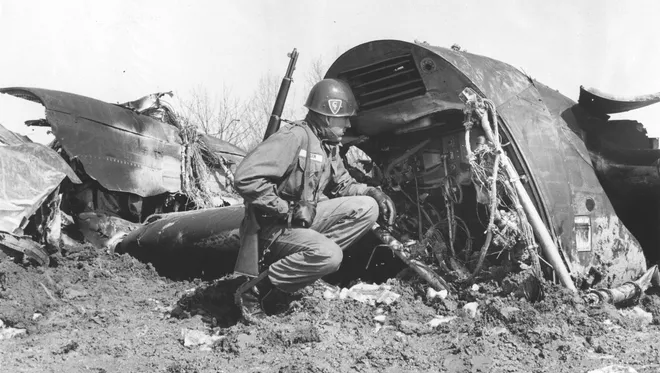
A National Guardsman inspects the wreckage of Northwest Airlines Flight 710

At about 3:20 p.m., Flight 710 was in level flight at 400 miles per hour (350 kn; 640 km/h) when the aircraft's right wing separated from the fuselage. The upper portion of the wing near the fuselage failed first, followed by the rest of the right wing and its engines over the next six to ten seconds. Portions of the outer left wing and its outboard engine also broke away. The loss of one wing and the partial loss of the other caused the aircraft to turn upside-down in the air.

Despite the aircraft losing its wings, its forward momentum carried it for more than three miles (five kilometers) before it began to arc downward toward the ground. During the descent, at least one of the engines on the remaining left wing continued to run at full power, which accelerated the aircraft into the dive. The plane struck farmland about eight miles (thirteen kilometers) east of Cannelton, Indiana, in a near-vertical, nose-first attitude at a speed of at least 600 miles per hour (520 kn; 970 km/h). Upon impact, the pressurized fuselage ruptured, and the rapid decompression flung debris and human remains over several hundred yards with a thunderous blast. Most of the fuselage buried itself in the frozen, snow-covered ground, leaving a crater about 15 feet (5 m) deep and 30 feet (9 m) wide.

Eyewitnesses on the ground reported seeing the aircraft fly overhead and seeing two puffs of white smoke come from the aircraft, followed by a large cloud of dark smoke within a few seconds. They heard two loud explosions, then saw a large piece of the aircraft fall off and burst into flames, followed by additional flaming objects falling from the plane. They saw the fuselage arcing downward, and when that struck the ground they heard what sounded like a huge explosion that rattled windows for miles around. Pilots of six United States Air Force aircraft that were conducting refueling operations nearby at 31,000 feet (9,400 m) spotted a dark smoke trail that disappeared into the cloud layer below, with a second horizontal plume extending a considerable distance from the main smoke cloud.

The crash was the third involving a Lockheed L-188 Electra since the type entered commercial service just over a year earlier. It was the first accident for Northwest Airlines since the April 1956 crash of Northwest Orient Airlines Flight 2, in which a Boeing 377 Stratocruiser crashed into Puget Sound, killing five people.

== Aftermath ==
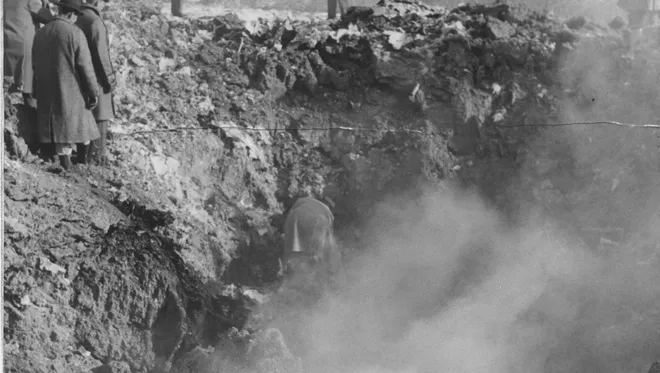
Officials look at a smoking crater left by the crash

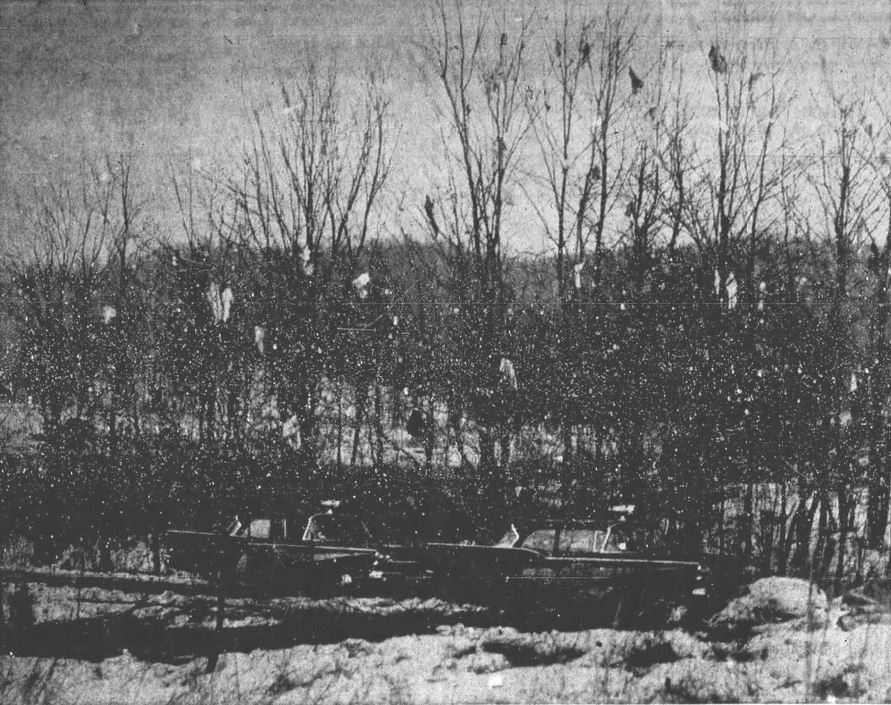
Clothing from the crash is scattered in trees around the crash site

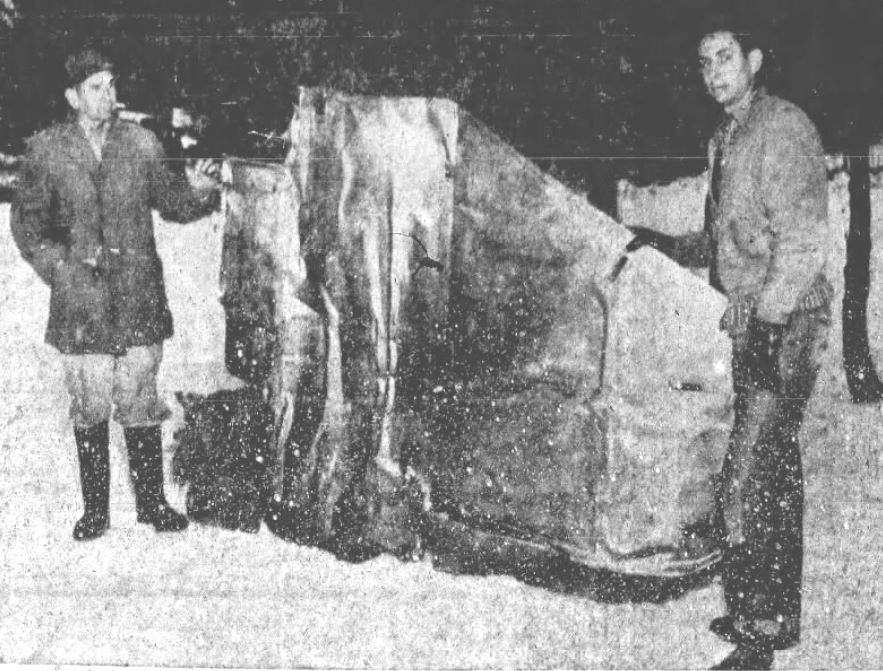
Two men hold a large piece of aircraft wreckage

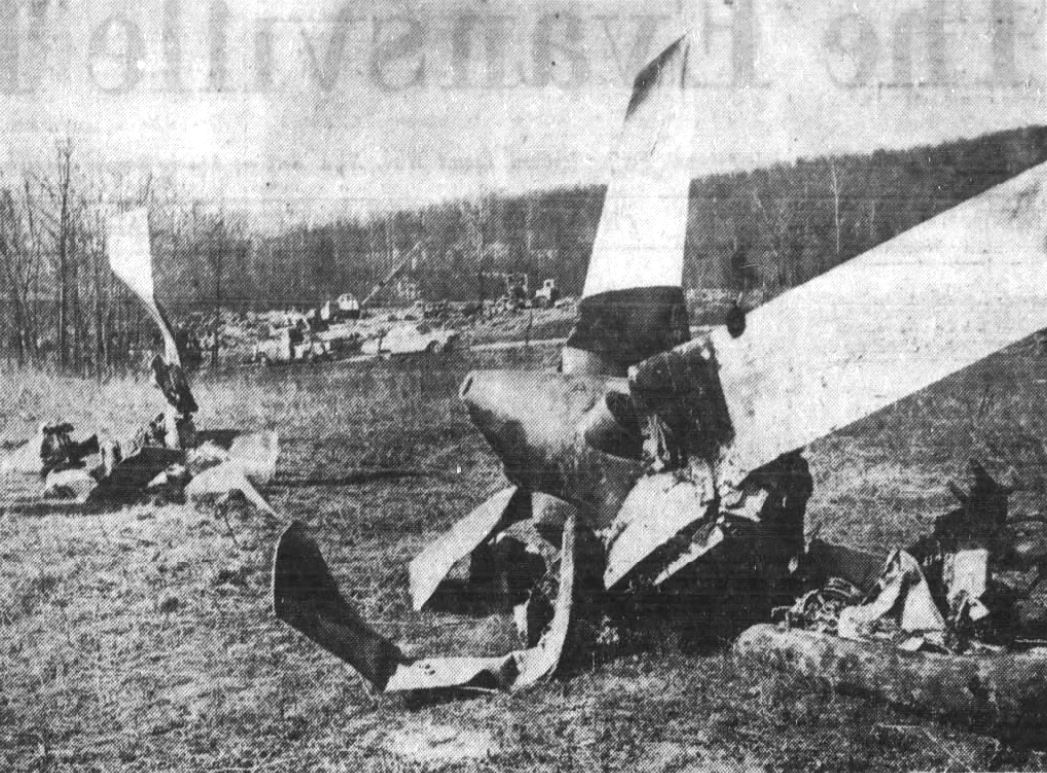
The crumpled remains of two of the propellers from the aircraft

The main part of the aircraft struck the ground near Cannelton, Indiana, about a mile (two kilometers) north of the Ohio River and about sixty miles (ninety-seven kilometers) southwest of Louisville, Kentucky. It buried itself in the ground, leaving a deep crater, throwing large chunks of earth up to 75 feet (23 m) away, and scattering small pieces of debris in the area. Outside the crater, only small pieces of the aircraft could be found, but small strips of metal from the aircraft, clothing, personal effects of the passengers, and unrecognizable body parts were scattered over a five-acre (two-hectare) area. Inside the crater, only a few pieces of wreckage were visible, and smoke from a smoldering fire obscured views.

A badly damaged, 40-foot (12 m) section of the aircraft's right wing landed in a barley field a little over two miles (five kilometers) from the crater, with its inboard engine still attached. The outer engines from the left and right wings and their propellers landed within 2,000 feet (610 m) of the right wing. The remaining parts of the left and right wings and portions of the engine structures were scattered over an area of about one mile (two kilometers) wide and seven miles (eleven kilometers) long. Some portions of a wing were recovered from a lake four miles (six kilometers) from the crater.

Witnesses originally called in reports that two aircraft had crashed after a mid-air collision, but they had mistaken the wing of Flight 710 as a second aircraft. Officers from the Indiana State Police and local police agencies arrived at the crater site and began searching for victims. They conducted a search in the field and the dense woods in the area, collecting clothing, personal belongings, and mail scattered around the area. A bus full of school children that had come across the accident scene a few minutes after the crash helped recover hundreds of pieces of mail. The Perry County Coroner and an assistant arrived, but they said the victims were so badly shattered that recovery was not immediately possible. Curious onlookers also arrived at the scene, so officers set up posts throughout the area to keep spectators away and blocked the roads that led to the crash scene. State police brought in portable generators and floodlights and officers continued the search into the night.

In Miami, where the plane had been scheduled to arrive at 6:21 p.m. Eastern Standard Time, nobody told the friends and relatives of the passengers of the flight about the crash. After waiting nearly an hour after the scheduled arrival time, the airline posted a sign that said that Flight 710 had turned around because of a storm and that the flight had been cancelled. The husband of one of the passengers aboard the flight called a local newspaper for more information and was told about the crash, and he passed the information on to the other people waiting at the airport. At 7:45, airline representatives called the relatives into a private office where they explained what had happened.

An inspection team consisting of three investigators from the Civil Aeronautics Board (CAB) and eight men from Northwest Airlines arrived late in the day at Dress Memorial Airport in nearby Evansville, Indiana. At 11:30 p.m. they left the airport in a caravan escorted by the State Police to visit the crash site. By the next day, they had been joined by additional investigators from the CAB, Northwest Airlines, Allison Engine Company, and the Federal Bureau of Investigation (FBI). A team of 44 soldiers from the Indiana National Guard and five private security agents arrived to help secure the area and to prevent onlookers from approaching closer than three miles (five kilometers) from the crash site or taking any of wreckage as souvenirs. Red Cross and Salvation Army workers set up portable kitchens in Cannelton to provide meals for the investigators and to provide assistance to any relatives of the victims who might arrive to try to claim the bodies of the deceased passengers. Postal inspectors arrived to search for the contents of the five sacks of mail that the plane had been carrying. They were eventually able to recover 26 pounds (12 kg) of the 77 pounds (35 kg) that was on the plane, but much of what they recovered was too damaged to read the addresses. Elected officials also came to the site to view the site first-hand.

The day after the crash, bright sunshine started melting the snow on the ground, and the edges of the crater began to cave in when searchers walked too close to it. Because of the cave-ins, the CAB cancelled its plans for searchers to use picks and shovels to dig into the crater to search for wreckage and victims. After a meeting of federal officials and Northwest Airlines officials, they decided to employ steam shovels to scoop out the wreckage from the crater. Grey smoke continued billowing from the crater. The Indiana Department of Transportation brought in heavy equipment including bulldozers, trucks, and a dragline excavator.

State troopers canvassed the crash site, picking up human remains, placing them in bags, and taking them to a community building in Cannelton where a temporary morgue was set up. All of the victims were badly shattered in the crash, and the searchers did not find any body parts larger than a hand. The CAB brought in two pathologists from the Armed Forces Institute of Pathology in Washington and a forensic pathologist from Chicago. They were given the task of analyzing the remains of the victims and attempting to identify them. The forensic pathologist said that it wouldn't be possible to identify much more than the gender of the victim from some of the remains, from microscopic examination of skin cells.

Two days after the crash, searchers began to use the dragline to dig into the crater. The muddy fields made it difficult for trucks to get into position to receive any of the wreckage that the draglines recovered, so crews used bulldozers to push the trucks into position and back out to the unloading points once they were loaded. Fresh snow made the search more difficult, as did two breakdowns of the excavator. Crews focused their excavation efforts on the sides of the crater in the first few days, and they made no effort to penetrate the layer of mud at the bottom to search for aircraft parts beneath it. As the digging progressed, the searchers uncovered one of the propellers and several parts of the remaining engine, which gave the investigators confidence that they would be able to find the rest of the remaining engine somewhere in the crater.

Excavation proceeded slowly, due to the fear that components such as magnesium engine parts could explode if they were exposed to the air in the right conditions. Engineers from Northwest Airlines estimated that there might be between 1,000 and 1,400 US gallons (3,800 and 5,300 L) of jet fuel in the crater that could explode at any time. Although jet fuel has to be heated to 492 °F (256 °C) to vaporize and is therefore generally less likely to explode than gasoline, it produces a more powerful explosion. A 1951 explosion at an Allison Engine test center in Indianapolis had killed eight people and had blown chunks of 40-inch (100 cm) thick walls as far as 500 feet (150 m) away. That explosion was caused by an explosion of jet fuel that had vaporized and ignited. The smoldering fire in the crater continued, and workers discovered that the temperature of the ground increased the deeper they went down. Each bucketful of dirt and debris came out steaming. The hot clay soil at the bottom of the crater had hardened and resembled baked brick. Firefighters from the Tell City Fire Department stood by in case they were needed, with pumps ready to draw water from a nearby creek.

On the afternoon of March 22, investigators halted the excavation of the crater when they uncovered the main location of the crash victims. What was left of the badly mangled remains, estimated to be a nearly unrecognizable 9,000-pound (4,100 kg) mass, was in an advanced state of decomposition. Because of concerns about the health risk to the site workers with the remains exposed, federal and state officials temporarily ordered the reburial of the section while they met to decide how the recovery should proceed. By the end of the day, they still had not yet reached a consensus on whether or not the remains should be removed from the crater or left undisturbed in their current place. Some advisors from local churches advocated for giving up the search for the pieces of the aircraft and filling in the crater to leave the victims in their final resting places, but CAB investigators still wanted to recover important aircraft components that could help them determine what had caused the crash. They wanted to remove the remains and continue the excavation. After consulting with health officials, clergy, and accident investigators, Indiana Governor Harold Handley ordered the excavation of the site to continue, citing the importance to public safety of finding out what had caused the crash. He said that it was his belief that the victims and their families would have wanted the investigation to continue. Officials requested assistance from the United States Army who sent a 33-man graves registration team to the site to remove the remains from the crater and transport them a cemetery in Tell City. Over three days, this team worked on the remains to remove them, attempt to identify any of them that were possible, and seal them in caskets for burial.

Meanwhile, the CAB used four hundred soldiers from Fort Knox, Kentucky, to conduct further foot-by-foot searches of a staked-off ten-square-mile (twenty-six-square-kilometer) area in the hilly terrain surrounding the crash site in search of more pieces of the aircraft. Those searches resulted in the discovery of a number of small aircraft parts, including a two-by-four-foot (sixty-by-one-hundred-centimeter) strip from one of the wings, found four miles (six kilometers) from the crater.

On March 29, investigators stopped the excavation efforts at the site. They had been able to recover the fourth engine from the crater, as well as portions of its propeller. Although CAB investigators had originally placed a high priority on locating the aircraft's instrument panel, by the end of the investigation they were already fairly certain that the crash was caused by a broken wing. They found a few components of the instrument panel, but they did not expect them to significantly affect the investigation. The State Highway Department used bulldozers to fill in the crater and level the field.

== Aircraft ==
The aircraft involved in the incident was a long-range Lockheed L-188C Electra, serial number 1057, and registered with tail number N121US. It was powered by four Allison 501-D turbine engines. This variant of the Electra, the long-range "L-188C" model, held 20% more fuel than the standard L-188A model and had a nonstop range of 3,400 miles (5,500 km). Northwest Airlines used the extra range the extra fuel capacity provided to offer the only non-stop transcontinental air route in the country, on flights between New York City and Seattle. It was configured to seat 72 passengers in a combination of first-class and coach seating.

Northwest Airlines had placed its first order for the L-188C Electras at the end of 1958, after recording a record profit of $5.6 million in the previous year. The company ordered ten aircraft, as well as spare parts and extra engines. N121US was the first of the new aircraft that had arrived during the summer of 1959, and after initial trials was placed into passenger service on September 1. In their first month of operation, Northwest's three Electras operated at more than 80% of capacity. By the end of the year, all ten Electras were in service, and the company ordered an additional eight. The popularity of flights on the new aircraft helped the company surpass two million passengers in a single year for the first time in its history, and the company's net profits grew to $5.7 million (equivalent to $63 million in 2025), despite the increased training and retooling expenses associated with the introduction of a new type of aircraft. Northwest primarily used the Electra on its medium-haul routes including Chicago to Miami and Minneapolis to New York City in addition to a long-haul nonstop route between New York and Seattle. The aircraft were purchased at a cost of $2.4 million (equivalent to $27 million in 2025) each.

The Lockheed Electras had only been in commercial service since the beginning of 1959. In the early days of Electra flights, operators reported excessive vibration in the aircraft during flight, especially in the seats in line with the four propellers. Lockheed resolved the issue by reinforcing the wings of all Electras and adjusting the mounting angle of the engines upward about three degrees.

At the time of the accident, N121US had flown for a total of 1,786 hours. Up to that time, that aircraft had an excellent record of service and maintenance records showed that it had only experienced minor system faults. It had last been inspected on March 9, 1960, and had flown a total of 74 hours since that inspection.

== Passengers and crew ==
Flight 710 carried 57 passengers and a crew of 6. Of the passengers, 48 were from the United States, 4 were from Canada, 1 was from Japan, and 4 passengers had unknown addresses. One of the passengers, Chiyoki Ikeda, was a Central Intelligence Agency (CIA) operative on duty working on an assignment. In 1997, he was memorialized by a star on the CIA Memorial Wall at the CIA headquarters in Langley, Virginia, for his death in the line of duty.

The Captain, Edgar LaParle, 57, had been employed at Northwest Airlines for 23 years. He was promoted to captain in 1940 and had recorded a total of 27,523 flying hours, including 254 hours in the Lockheed L-188 Electra. Originally from Chicago, he was a resident of Edina, Minnesota, and had first learned to fly at the end of World War I. He came to work at Northwest Airlines after working as a private pilot and a test pilot for an aircraft manufacturing firm in Milwaukee, Wisconsin.

The first officer was Joseph C. Mills, 27, who had been employed at Northwest Airlines as a first officer for three years. He obtained his pilot's license at age 15 and had served five years in the United States Air Force where he flew refueling tankers out of Lincoln, Nebraska. At the time of the crash, he had a total of 2,974 flying hours including 200 on the Lockheed Electra.

The flight engineer was Arnold W. Kowall, 40, who was a 17-year veteran at Northwest Airlines. He was promoted to flight engineer after starting at the company as an aircraft mechanic. At the time of the crash, he had a total of 5,230 flying hours, of which 63 were in the Electra.

== Investigation ==
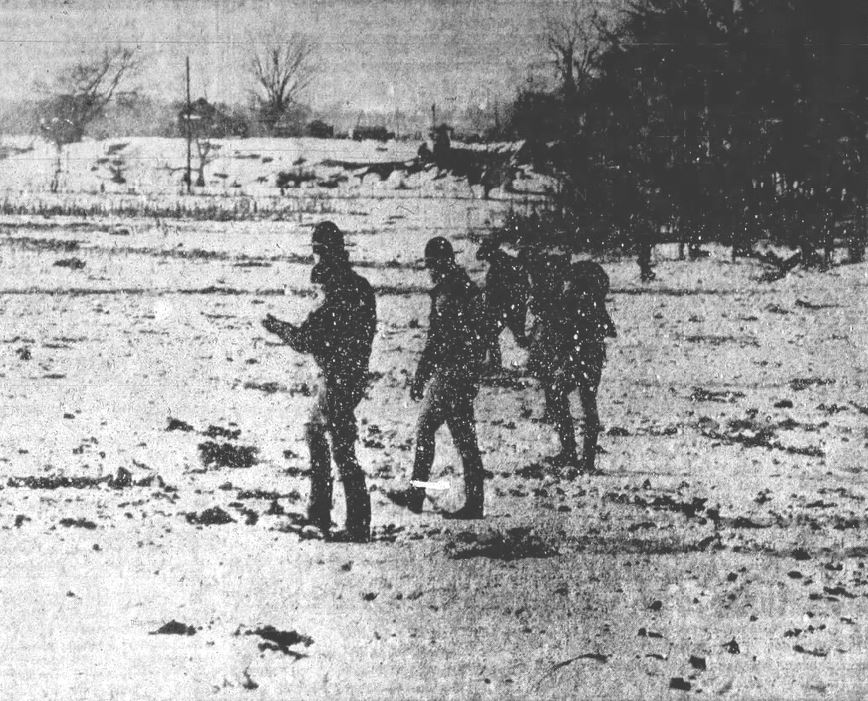
Officers from the Indiana State Police comb the ground in search of wreckage

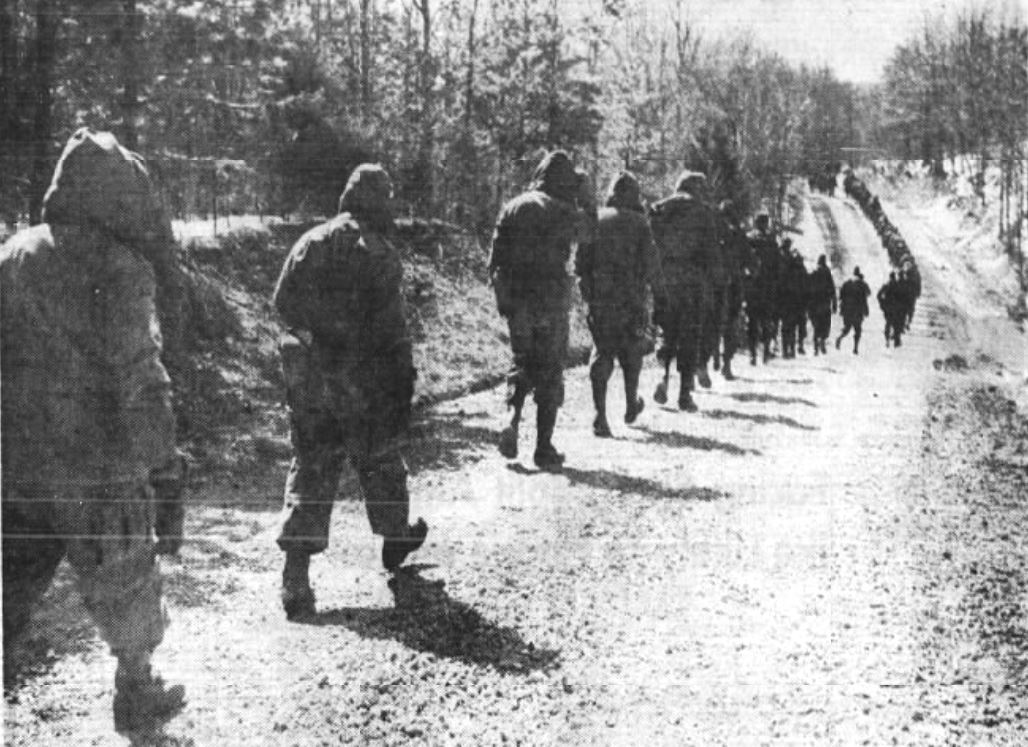
Soldiers from Fort Knox, Kentucky, walk to search for wreckage of the aircraft

At the scene of the crash, investigators from the CAB oversaw the excavation and recovery of the wreckage of Flight 710. In the first few days, teams of investigators spread out in search of witnesses while their memories of what they had seen were still clear. They interviewed 76 eyewitnesses, and obtained written statements from 33 of them. Other investigators worked to collect recordings of radio transmissions between Flight 710 and air traffic controllers, and to compile a history of the actions taken by the pilots during the final flight.

As aircraft parts and debris were recovered from the crater during the excavation, they were brought to a rack where they were washed with hoses and secured for offsite examination. The parts were stockpiled in a central location near the crash site. At the conclusion of the search for parts, the recovered wreckage was sealed in trucks and shipped to Lockheed's factory in Burbank, California. The engine wreckage was sent to Allison's factory in Indianapolis for analysis. CAB officials oversaw the investigation at the factories, supervising the tests that were performed on the recovered components.

CAB officials said that they were exploring several different theories of why the aircraft had crashed. With reports coming in of other aircraft experiencing severe turbulence in the area around the same time as the crash, one theory that they looked into was that the violently turbulent air had caused an in-flight breakup of the aircraft. Other theories included whether the aircraft had suffered an in-flight rapid decompression, caused by metal fatigue, a thrown propeller, or a bomb on the plane.

Agents from the FBI were the primary investigators into whether a bomb or other sabotage had brought down the aircraft. The previous November, National Airlines Flight 967 had vanished over the Gulf of Mexico during a flight from Tampa, Florida, to New Orleans. The crash was widely suspected to have been caused by a bomb explosion, but the aircraft had never been found. In January, National Airlines Flight 2511 crashed in North Carolina after a heavily insured passenger detonated a bomb in the cabin. Two hours after Flight 710 had crashed, an anonymous caller telephoned the Chicago Police Department and said that there was a bomb on a plane at Midway Airport. Officers investigated, but they were not sure whether the caller was referring to Flight 710 or a different plane at Chicago. The suspected bombings of the two National Airlines flights in the previous months had led to a spike in the number of bomb hoaxes that were being called in to officials. The day after the accident, another anonymous bomb threat caused a Delta Air Lines plane en route from Memphis to Atlanta to perform an emergency return to Memphis where the aircraft was evacuated. Three days after the crash, the family of an Federal Aviation Agency (FAA) employee involved with the Flight 710 investigation received an anonymous telephone call that said that his plane would be "bombed" during his flight home to Indianapolis that night. The skyrocketing number of bomb hoaxes across the country led to the FBI going public with an aggressive program to prosecute people who make bomb threats. In the 1960 fiscal year, the FBI opened 484 cases of false reports of bombs, compared to 275 that had been made in 1959. United States Attorneys authorized prosecution in 94 of the cases, and 47 people were convicted. Despite the rampant bomb threats that were coming in, a CAB spokesman said that the possibility that a bomb had caused the crash of Flight 710 was "very remote".

The CAB held a two-day public hearing at the McCurdy Hotel in Evansville that began on May 10, 1960. The board heard from five eyewitnesses who described what they had observed as Flight 710 crashed. Witnesses testified that six weeks before the crash, the aircraft had suffered from a fuel leak in its right wing. The leak had occurred during refueling at Idlewild Airport in New York City, and was caused by a bolt that was too long that had been installed on the top of the wing's fuel tank. The leak was repaired immediately, but for about ten minutes, the wing had been subjected to extra strain. As of the time of the hearing, investigators were still trying to determine whether the leaking fuel could have damaged the wing's structural components. The board also heard reports that ground crews had experienced problems getting the plane's passenger door to close in Minneapolis and in Chicago on the day of the final flight. A fight instructor for Northwest Airlines testified that he had flown the accident aircraft on the morning of the crash, performing a crew training flight in the Minneapolis area. He said that maintenance crews had received reports that the plane's propellers were out of synchronization, but he found them to be running perfectly during his flight. Two passengers who had departed the plane after the flight from Minneapolis testified, with one of them stating that he had taken over 40 flights to Midway Airport, but the landing in Chicago just before the fatal flight to Miami was the roughest he had ever experienced. The other passenger, however, testified that he considered the landing to be routine, neither rougher nor smoother than normal.

== Whirl mode wing flutter ==
On September 29, 1959, a different Lockheed Electra operating Braniff International Airways Flight 542 exploded in the air over Buffalo, Texas and crashed, killing the 34 occupants of the aircraft. The left wing was found to have broken off about a foot or two from where it attached to the fuselage and fell to the ground about a mile (2 km) from the rest of the wreckage. After more than six months of investigation, officials from the CAB knew that the wing had broken off in flight, but they were unable to pinpoint what had caused the break. Running out of ideas, the officials were preparing to close the investigation without identifying a probable cause just as Northwest Airlines Flight 710 crashed.

Immediately after the crash of Flight 710, the FAA issued flight restrictions on the Electras until the cause of the crashes could be determined. Despite pressure from politicians and the CAB to completely prohibit flights using the aircraft until the cause could be identified, the FAA allowed airlines to continue to operate the aircraft under new speed limits and operating restrictions while the investigation continued. The FAA required the operators of Electras to immediately perform a series of tests and inspections on all of the Electras in their fleets to verify their structural integrity. It also ordered Lockheed to answer questions about the airworthiness of the Electra, and to perform a reevaluation of the aircraft's structural strength.

Over eight weeks, Lockheed conducted an investigation involving 250 engineers and technicians to perform a series of tests on the Electra to determine the cause of the failures. The company performed flight tests involving a highly instrumented Electra in areas of severe turbulence where test pilots performed violent maneuvers to measure the effects on the aircraft. Engineers performed mechanical tests on the ground involving a complete aircraft to measure the effects of vibration and stress on key structures, and performed destructive testing on a wing taken from the factory's production line. They constructed a one-eighth scale model of the Electra and tested it in the Transonic Dynamics Tunnel at NASA's Langley Research Center. The engineers discovered that when an Electra with damage to the mounting structures of one of the outboard engines flew at high speeds or in areas of turbulence, destructive whirl mode wing flutter could occur, leading to wing failure. Wing flutter is a rapid, self-sustaining oscillation of an aircraft's wings, typically triggered by factors such as aerodynamic disturbances from turbulence or operation at high airspeeds. The Electra was designed and tested to be highly resistant to wing flutter, and able to rapidly dampen it when it occurred. Whirl mode refers to the gyroscopic effect of an aircraft's propeller, which is ordinarily very stable within its plane of rotation and is one of the mechanisms the aircraft uses to help dampen wing flutter. When a strong external force acts to push a propeller out of its plane of rotation, it will begin to wobble, similar to how a spinning top will wobble when it is knocked. In an aircraft. that external force could be from strong air turbulence or from a sudden change in the plane's direction. Ordinarily, the aircraft's engine mounts are designed to help absorb the forces caused by the wobble and return the propeller to a stable plane. However, when there was damage to the Electra's engine mounting structure, its ability to absorb the energy of the wobble became greatly reduced, and the wobble could then cause further damage to the mounting structure. This cycle continued until the wobble became severe enough that it transferred some energy of the wobble to the wing, leading to wing flutter. This is called whirl mode wing flutter, and as the engine mount became more and more damaged and weakened by the forces of the wobble, more and more energy was transferred to the wing. Eventually the forces of the induced wing flutter became greater than the wing was designed to withstand, and the structural components of the wing failed.

== Second CAB hearings ==
The CAB held a second set of hearings between July 20 and July 22 at the Hollywood Roosevelt Hotel in Hollywood, California. The purpose of the second hearings was to go over the technical aspects of the investigation. At the beginning of the hearing, CAB chairman Whitney Gillilland stated that the board was very much aware of the similarities between the crash of Flight 710 and the 1959 crash of Braniff Flight 542, but facts from the Braniff crash would not factor into the testimony at the hearing. A total of 39 witnesses testified at the three-day hearing, representing Lockheed, the FAA, NASA, and the Allison Division of General Motors. The CAB chief of the Bureau of Safety Engineering testified that the right wing of the Electra and a portion of the left wing broke off in flight. Lockheed engineers testified to the ground and flight tests that had been performed on the Electra before it had been certified, and experts from the CAB testified about the engine tilt modifications that had been performed by Lockheed to resolve the vibration issues in the early days of operation. On the final day of the hearing, representatives from Lockheed presented the company's findings about whirl mode wing flutter that they believed caused the crash, with engine mount damage as the primary cause.

== Accident report ==
The CAB released the final accident report on April 28, 1961. The report concluded that the pilots of Flight 710 had been conducting the flight in accordance with company procedures, and that they had closely followed the filed flight plan. It stated that the weather conditions in the area of the accident that were reported to the pilots clearly indicated that there was a high likelihood that clear-air turbulence would be present, but that the United States Weather Bureau and Northwest Airlines did not mention anything about clear-air turbulence in the information they provided to the pilots. It mentioned that the wreckage of the aircraft was extremely damaged by fire and impact forces, but that in the systems and components that the investigators had been able to recover, they found no sign of distress or malfunction. The report extensively reviewed the dynamics of whirl mode wing flutter, and the effects that it would have had on the aircraft. It then outlined specific evidence recovered from components of the wings and engine mounts that showed how the wings had failed due to flutter causing rapidly reversing loads on the wings up to the point of failure. It mentioned that investigators had found damage to the rib and rib attachment structures in the left wing, and said that the damage could have been caused by wing flutter, but it more closely resembled damage that had been suffered by other Electras as a result of an abnormally hard landing. The report stated that there were several possibilities of what may have caused the weakening of the engine mounting structures that allowed whirl mode wing flutter to become self-sustaining, but that the complex interactions of the many components made it impossible to determine exactly what had happened. The report concluded that the probable cause of the crash was the failure of aircraft's right wing due to wing flutter that had been caused by oscillations of the outboard engine assemblies. Contributing to the crash was a reduced stiffness of the aircraft's wings and its flight into an area of clear-air turbulence.

== LEAP ==
After discovering the whirl mode wing flutter issue, Lockheed's engineers were faced with the task of determining what modifications needed to be made to each aircraft for it to be able to absorb or resist the forces that led to the problem. The Lockheed Electra Action Program, or LEAP, was what the company named the process to reexamine the original aircraft engineering data, find a way to resolve the problem, and apply the necessary repairs to all Electras in service.

The company's engineers redesigned the engine mounts, nacelles and cowlings, and modified the wings of the Electra to increase their strength. The Allison Engine Company redesigned how the gear box of the engines attach to the engine struts. The combined modifications added an additional 1,400 pounds (640 kg) of metal to the aircraft. Performed at a cost to Lockheed of $25 million (equivalent to $270 million in 2025), the modifications received an interim approval from the FAA in late 1960, and a final recertification on December 30, 1960, allowing aircraft that had received the modifications to resume flights at full speed.

The aircraft modification process took place at Lockheed's factory in Burbank, in a process that worked on nine aircraft simultaneously over the course of twenty days. Lockheed worked with the airlines to arrange the schedule for each of the repairs, working around each company's holidays, busy periods, and other schedule restrictions. By April, Lockheed had applied the modifications to nearly half of the 165 Electras in airline service around the world. The final Electra to be completed was returned to Ansett-ANA on July 5, 1961.

== Rebuilding confidence ==
The reputation of the Electra had suffered greatly during the period between the Northwest Airlines crash and the FAA approval of the Electra modifications. After the discovery of the whirl mode wing flutter issue, and the development of modifications that would prevent it, the airlines launched a program to restore the public's trust in the aircraft. In addition to the Braniff and Northwest crashes, two more Electras had crashed during 1960, although neither involved a structural failure of the aircraft. On September 14, 1960, American Airlines Flight 361 crashed during a landing at LaGuardia Airport in New York City when the aircraft struck a runway dike and flipped over with no fatalities. On October 4, 1960, 62 people died when Eastern Air Lines Flight 375 crashed during takeoff from Boston's Logan Airport after striking a flock of starlings, causing engine failures. To counteract negative public perceptions of the Electra, American Airlines sent out what it called "truth squads" or "fact teams". Beginning in November 1960, these teams of pilots, engineers, and public relations staffers traveled from city to city holding news conferences and meeting with politicians and civic groups. They explained the concepts of whirl mode and wing flutter, described the investigation, and outlined the aircraft redesigns that would resolve the problems. They mentioned the accidents in New York and Boston, and explained that those accidents could have happened with any aircraft, and then opened the meetings to any questions. In two months, the five teams repeated this in 18 of the 26 cities that were being served by Electras. In New York, Chicago, and Washington, D.C., American Airlines offered thirty-minute sight seeing flights in an Electra for $6.50. The flights ended up being so popular that American expanded the program to Boston, Nashville, Syracuse, Buffalo, Detroit, Hartford, and Philadelphia.

After the modifications, airlines once again started promoting the fact that they offered service on Electras, and made up new names for the upgraded versions. Some called their modified aircraft the "Electra II". Others called it the "Super Electra" or the "Mark II". By the end of September 1961, American Airlines reported that its load factors on Electras were even higher than they were on pure jets. At Northwest Airlines, load factors on the Electra were higher than almost every type of aircraft the company flew. At Western Air Lines, load factors in August had risen to sixty two percent, from a low of forty nine percent. At Braniff Airlines, load factors in Fall 1961 matched the sales rates of their Boeing 707 fleet, which was a fifty percent increase over Spring 1960. The popularity of Electra flights at Eastern Airlines and National Airlines also recovered. In 1964, the two major vice presidential candidates for the 1964 United States presidential election used chartered Electras on their campaign.

Lockheed ended the production of the L-188 Electra in 1961. The company lost $53 million (equivalent to $570 million in 2025) on the Electra project, with only 170 aircraft ever built. This was due to a number of factors, including the arrival of faster, more competitive pure jet aircraft like the Boeing 707 and Boeing 727. However, the Lockheed P-3 Orion, which was based on the L-188 Electra and designed as an antisubmarine and patrol aircraft for the U.S. Navy, was very successful for the company, and more than 700 aircraft across sixteen variants were produced in the thirty years it was built.

Nearly every airline that operated the Electra described it as the most reliable, economical, and efficient aircraft type in its fleet, even surpassing pure jets on some routes. On short flights, the pure jets did not have any speed advantage over the Electra, but used far more fuel. In 1964, there were 165 Electras in commercial service at 14 airlines. As early as 1963, companies attempting to purchase new Electras on the second-hand market were being forced to pay prices that were nearly as high as the $2.5 million (equivalent to $26 million in 2025) cost the aircraft had sold for brand new. At least three airlines had standing orders to purchase Electras from other carriers as soon as they were ready to retire them, and one airline turned down an offer of $2 million (equivalent to $21 million in 2025) for one of its used Electras.

== Legacy ==
In 1964, the FAA amended its aircraft design regulations relating to an aircraft's resistance to flutter, deformation, and vibration. The new standard required the designer to consider the effects that a change in the angle of the propeller would have on the flight characteristics. The rule change also required aircraft designs to consider what impact a failure of multiple structural components would have on the amount of vibration experienced by the aircraft. Another rule change more clearly defined the speeds at which an aircraft was required to be free from wing flutter. The Electra accidents led to designers and regulators taking a closer look at the various ways an aircraft structure can fail, resulting in a more thorough approach being developed to ensure that planes in service remain structurally sound. This includes a system of regular, carefully managed inspections to identify damage, whether from manufacturing flaws, damage, fatigue, or environmental effects such as corrosion, before the damage weakens the structure enough to lead to failure.

== Memorials ==
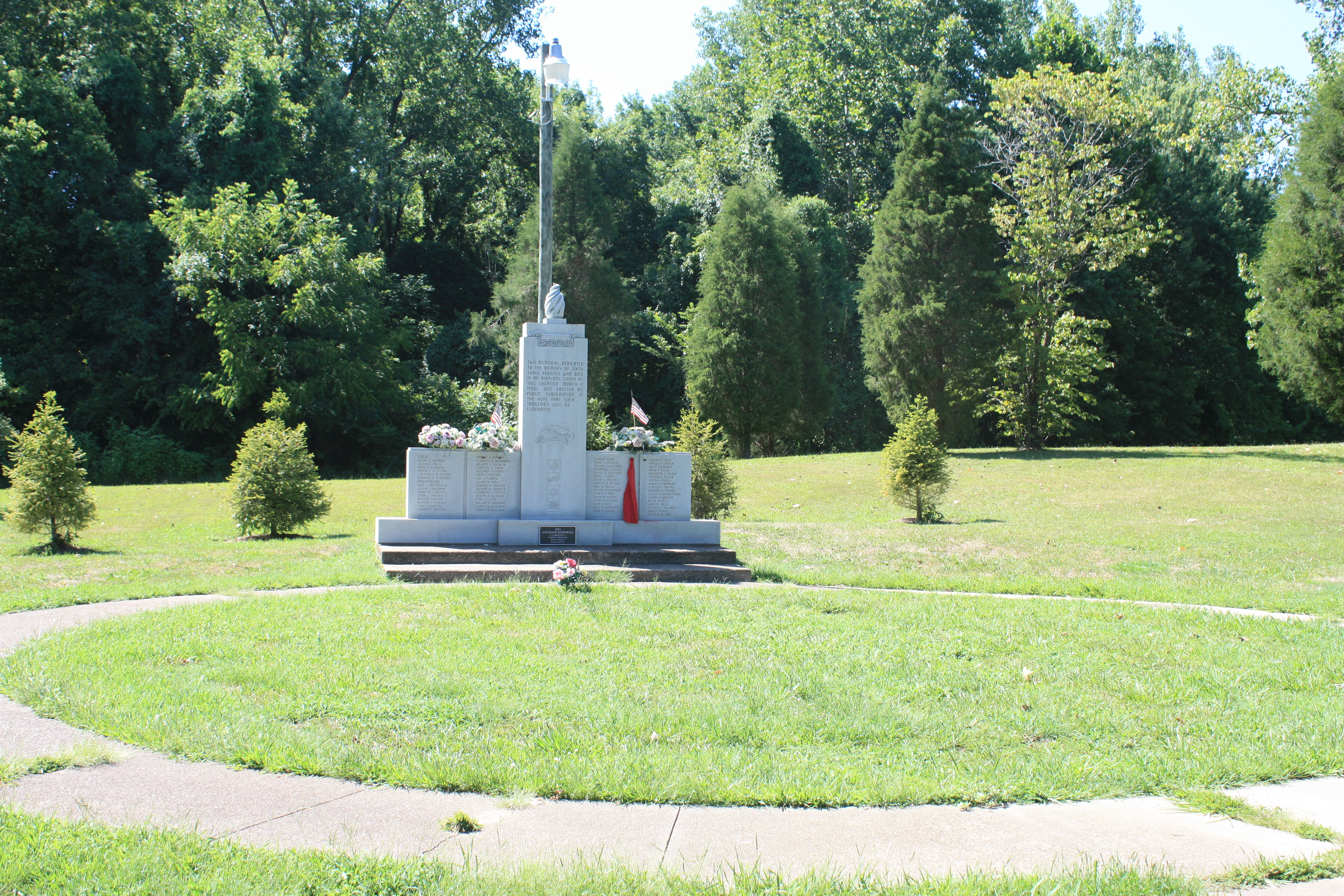
The Kiwanis Club memorial erected at the scene of the crash

The week after the accident, Northwest Airlines purchased a ten-lot section at Greenwood Cemetery in Tell City for the purpose of interring the remains of the victims of Flight 710. It arranged a memorial service to be held at the cemetery six days after the crash, and arranged for the transportation of relatives of the victims on chartered aircraft. The president of Northwest Airlines and several officials of the airline personally attended the memorial service. In September 1960, the company arranged for the erection of a 15-foot (4.6 m) tall granite monument at the cemetery with the names of the victims and the words "In Memoriam - March 17, 1960". Because of the company's unusual actions in showing that it was shocked about the accident and that it cared about the victims of the crash, it received an unusually large number of letters about the accident, with most of the letter writers expressing positive views toward the company. Few other airline companies had previously taken this type of approach with their management of an emergency.

The actual location of the crash was turned into a one-acre park maintained by Perry County. A year after the crash of Flight 710, local residents led by the Cannelton Kiwanis Club and local newspaper editor Bob Cummings raised funds to erect a granite memorial at the crash site. The eight-ton memorial has a "flame of everlasting life" at the top of a center shaft that reaches nine feet in the air. The center part of the monument is inscribed with the words "This memorial, dedicated to the memory of 63 persons who died in an airline accident at this location, March 17, 1960, was erected by public subscription in the hope that such tragedies will be eliminated." Panels on each side of the center shaft are engraved with the names of the 63 victims of the crash.
