= Senator Tobin =

Senator Tobin may refer to:

- Arthur Tobin (1930–2026), Massachusetts State Senate
- Erin Tobin (fl. 2020s), South Dakota State Senate
- Löki Tobin (fl. 2020s), Alaska State Senate
- Robert Tobin (politician) (1815–1898), Indiana State Senate
