= Mount Pleasant, Perry County, Indiana =

Mount Pleasant
- Unincorporated community
- Location within Indiana Location within the United States
- Coordinates: 38°07′18″N 86°31′04″W
- Country: United States
- State: Indiana
- County: Perry
- Township: Union
- Elevation: 787 ft (240 m)
- Time zone: UTC-6 (Central (CST))
  - Summer (DST): UTC-5 (CDT)
- ZIP code: 47520
- Area codes: 812, 930
- GNIS feature ID: 451251

Mount Pleasant is an unincorporated community in Union Township, Perry County, in the U.S. state of Indiana.

== History ==
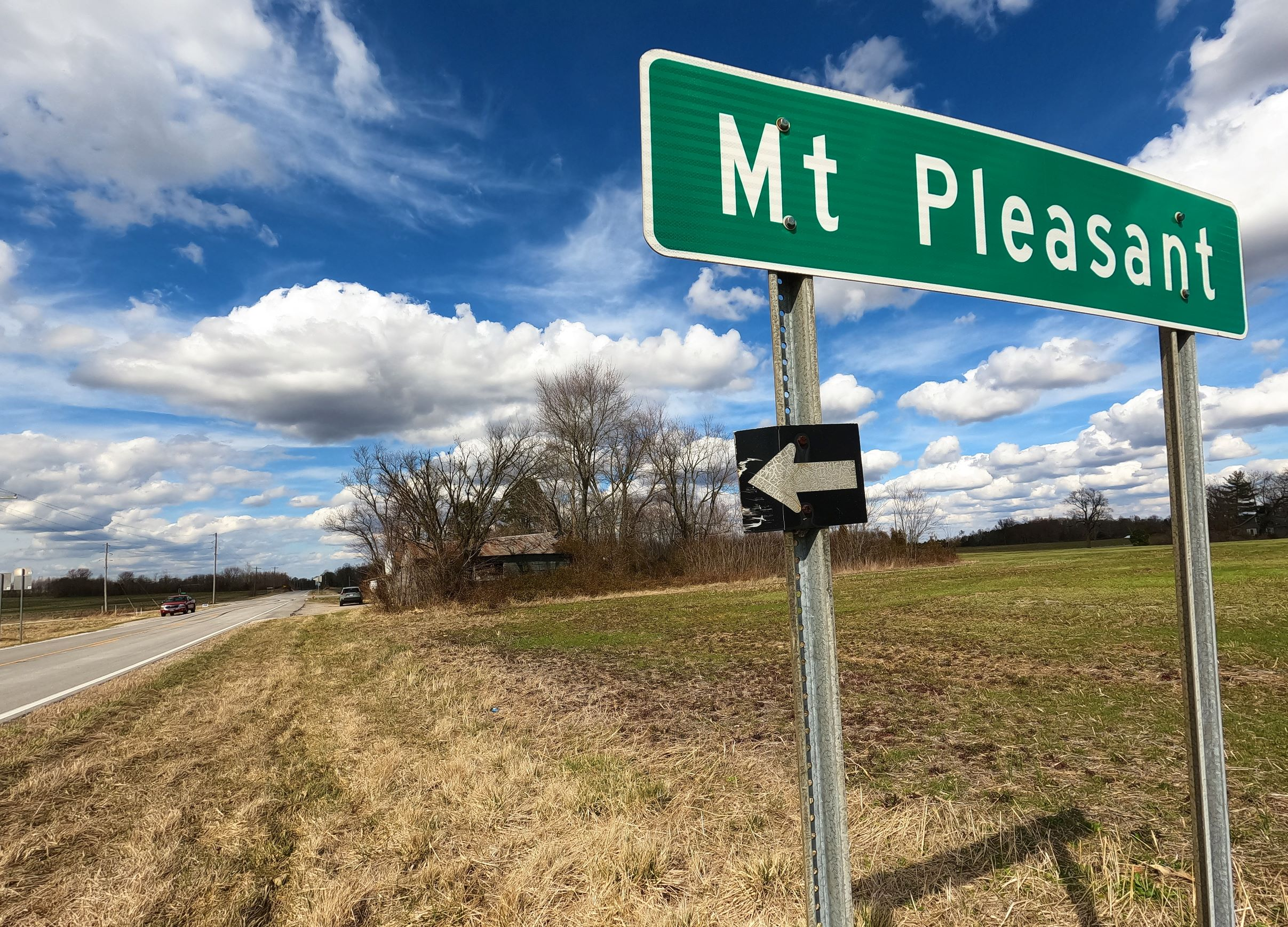
Mount Pleasant, Indiana

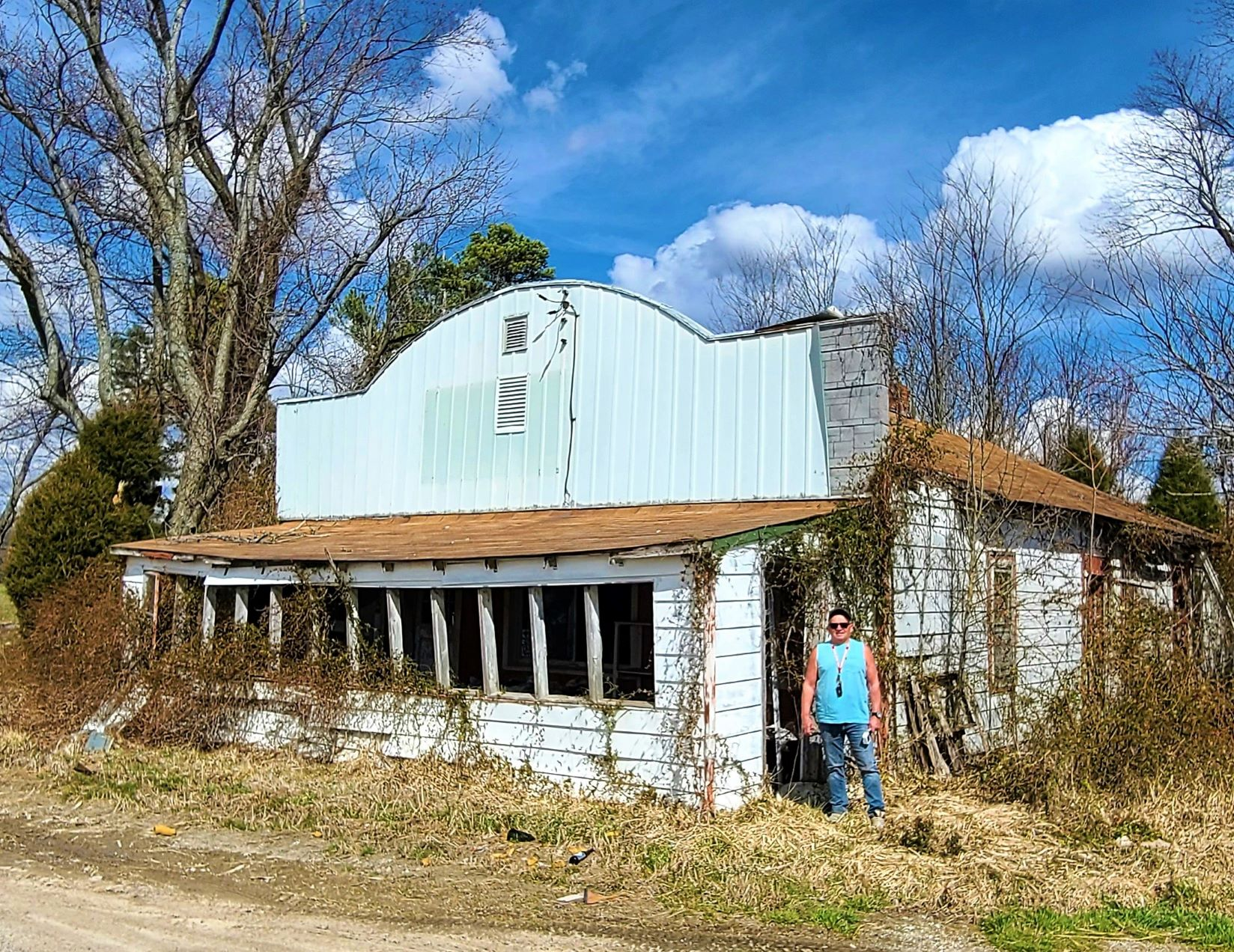
The old Post Office & General Store

A post office was established at Mount Pleasant in 1869, and remained in operation until 1943. The community was named after its lofty elevation.
