= Huffman Mill Covered Bridge =

- U.S. National Register of Historic Places
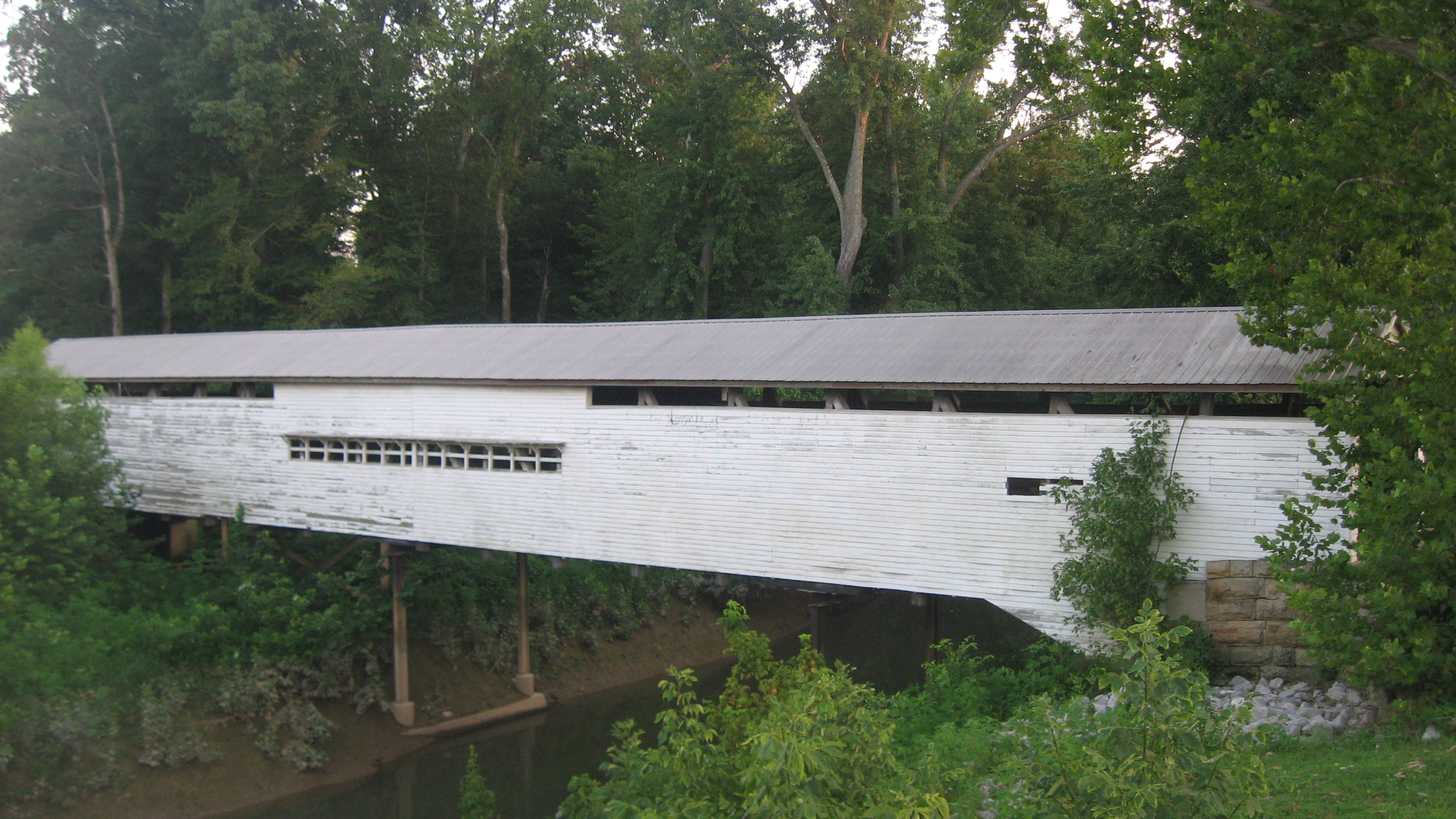
- Huffman Mill Covered Bridge, July 2011

- Location within Indiana Location within the United States
- Location: CR 1490N over the Anderson River, east of Fulda, Anderson Township, Perry County, Indiana and Harrison Township, Spencer County, Indiana
- Coordinates: 38°6′14″N 86°46′37″W
- Area: less than one acre
- Built: 1864-1865
- Built by: Washer, William T.
- Architectural style: Burr arch truss
- NRHP reference No.: 98000299
- Added to NRHP: April 1, 1998

Huffman Mill Covered Bridge is a historic covered bridge spanning the Anderson River in Anderson Township, Perry County, and Harrison Township, Spencer County, Indiana. It was built in 1864–1865, and is a 148-foot-long, Burr arch truss wood, stone, and steel bridge. It is one-lane wide and is covered by a gabled, steel roof.

It was listed on the National Register of Historic Places in 1998.
