= Uniontown, Perry County, Indiana =

Uniontown
- Unincorporated community
- Location within Indiana Location within the United States
- Coordinates: 38°13′31″N 86°39′39″W
- Country: United States
- State: Indiana
- County: Perry
- Township: Clark
- Elevation: 686 ft (209 m)
- Time zone: UTC-6 (Central (CST))
  - Summer (DST): UTC-5 (CDT)
- ZIP code: 47515
- Area codes: 812, 930
- GNIS feature ID: 451591

Uniontown is an unincorporated community in Clark Township, Perry County, in the U.S. state of Indiana. It may be synonymous with Fosters Ridge.

== History ==
A post office was established at Fosters Ridge in 1858, and remained in operation until 1890. The community's namesake, Alexander Foster, served as postmaster.

A post office was relocated or redesignated to Uniontown from Fosters Ridge in 1890. The post office remained in operation at Uniontown until it was discontinued in 1974.
