= Robert Tobin (politician) =

Businessman, politician and civil war veteran

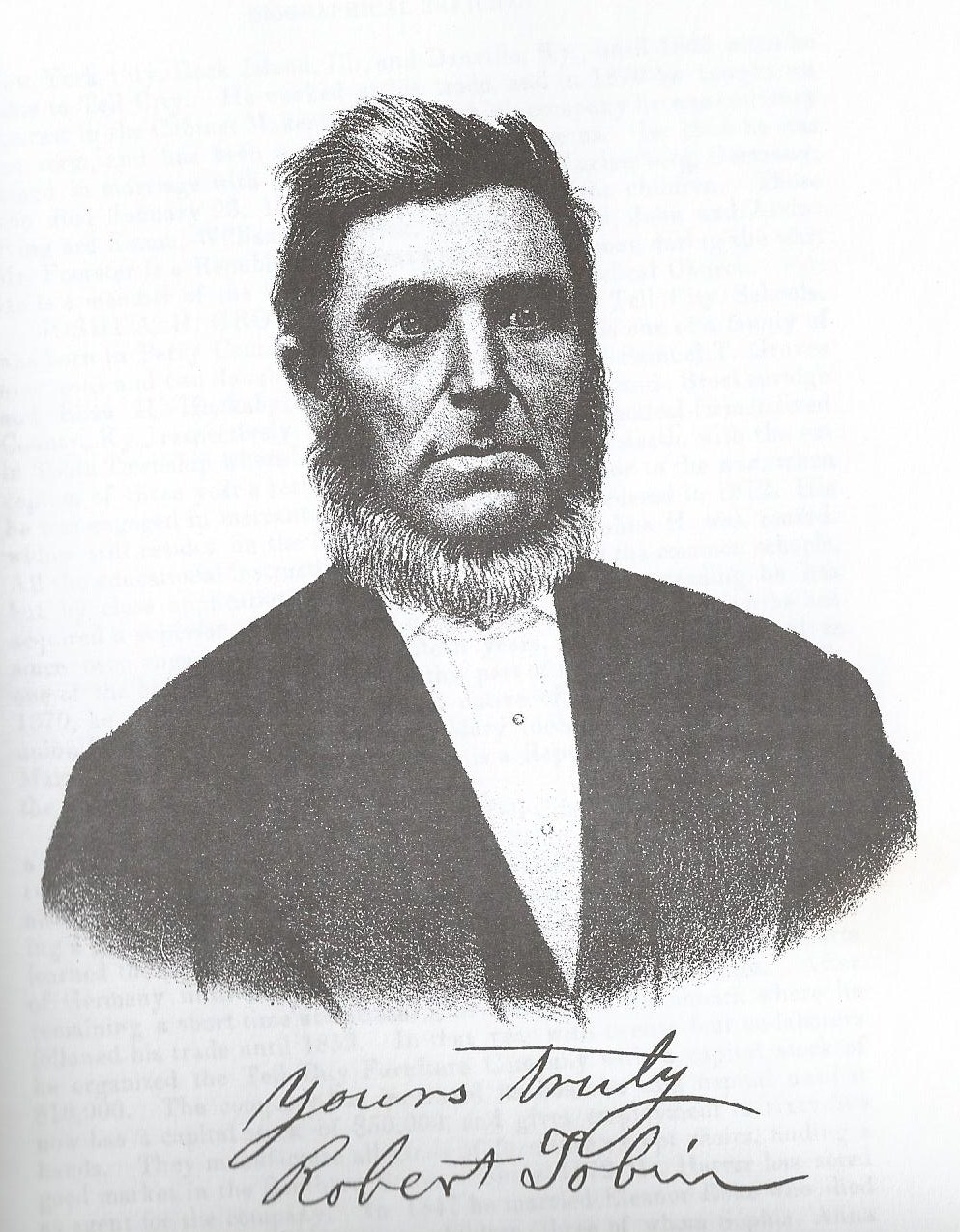
Robert Tobin

Robert Tobin (December 7, 1815 – July 8, 1898) from Tobinsport, Indiana was the grandchild of George Tobin, one of the first pioneers to settle in Perry County in the early 1790s. George had negotiated the land rights of his property with the local Native American chiefs. When hearing that Gilbert du Motier, Marquis de Lafayette's ship had sunk on the Ohio River during his 1825 tour of the United States, Robert, then ten years old, walked with his parents to meet with the Marquis. Robert was educated in a log cabin and eventually became a very successful businessman and farmer. He would eventually own upwards of 1,000 acres of land in Perry County. On October 8, 1840, Robert married Jane Blaine from Breckinridge County, Kentucky.

During the Civil War, Robert Tobin mustered a volunteer force, called the Tobin Guards, to protect Tobinsport from Confederate raiders. The force was raised on September 30, 1861, but saw no action during the war, besides an incursion into Cloverport, Kentucky to discourage raiders from threatening that area.

After the civil war, Robert became the postmaster for the newly established town post office. Interested in politics, Robert identified as a republican. He ran for office and became the state senator for both Perry and Spencer counties in the elections of 1875.

Tobin died on 8 July 1898 and is buried at Lamb Cemetery in Tobinsport.
