= Rome, Indiana =

- Unincorporated community
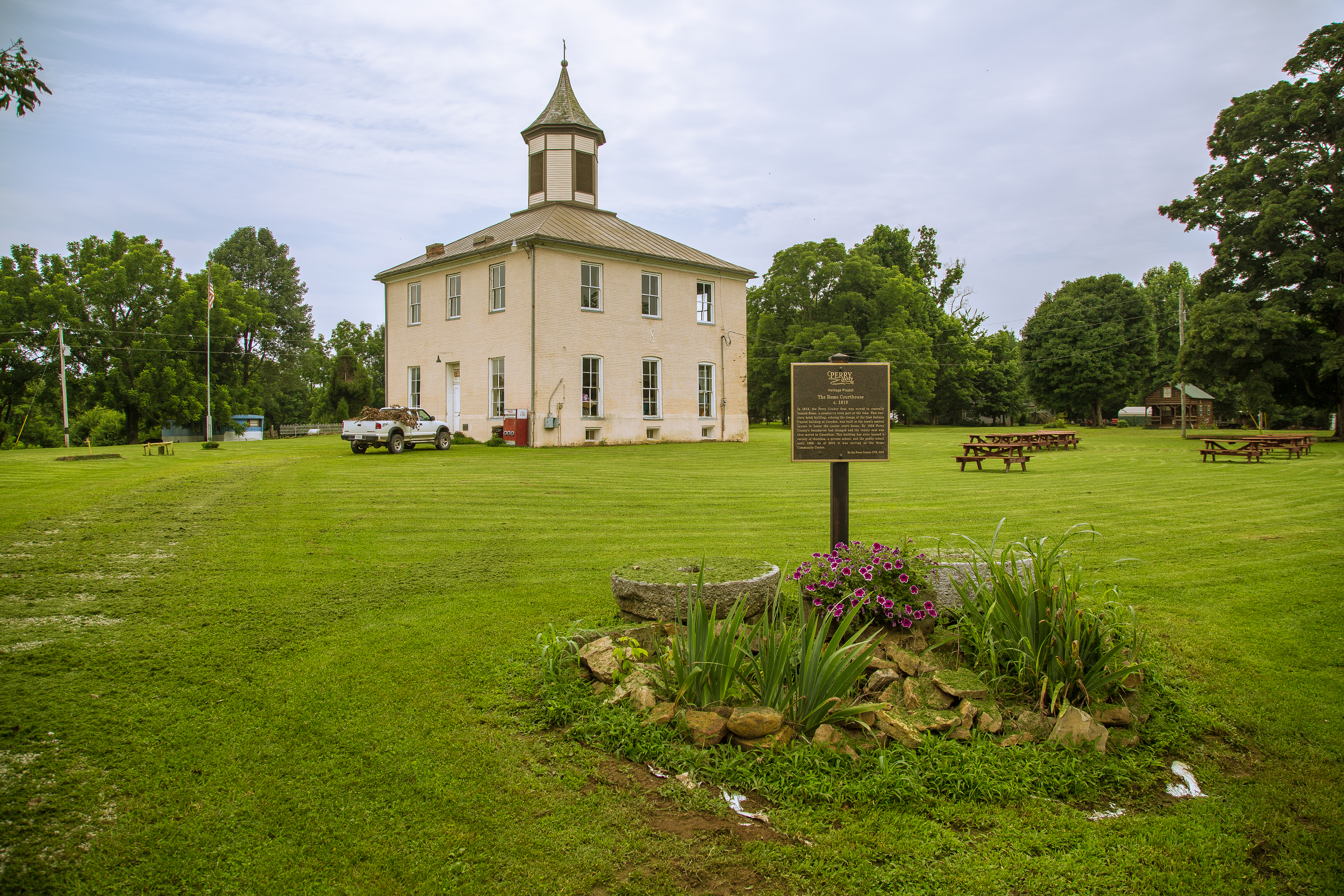
- The old Perry County Courthouse

- Location within Indiana Location within the United States
- Coordinates: 37°55′24″N 86°31′25″W
- Country: United States
- State: Indiana
- County: Perry
- Township: Tobin
- Elevation: 410 ft (120 m)
- Time zone: UTC-6 (Central (CST))
  - Summer (DST): UTC-5 (CDT)
- ZIP code: 47574
- Area codes: 812, 930
- GNIS feature ID: 451405

Rome is an unincorporated community along the Ohio River in southeastern Tobin Township, Perry County, in the U.S. state of Indiana.

The community lies across the river from Stephensport, Kentucky and just off Indiana State Road 66 approximately thirteen miles east of Tell City, the county seat of Perry County.

== History ==
Rome was first established as Washington. The name was changed to Franklin before finally settling on Rome in 1819. A post office was established at Rome that year, and remained in operation until it was discontinued in 2008. From 1819 until 1859, Rome was the second county seat of Perry County, after Troy. The Rome Courthouse was built in 1819 to mimic the first Indiana Capitol in Corydon. The small town located in the Hoosier National Forest was the home of former Indiana governor Edgar Whitcomb, during the final years of his life.

A group of 56 freedom seekers was captured near Rome in September 1826 following the Ohio River slave rebellion. The captives were taken to Breckinridge County, Kentucky, where five were later executed for their role in the rebellion; the remainder were re-enslaved in Paris, Kentucky, and the Deep South.

== Demographics ==
Historical population
Census	Pop.	Note	%±
1850	349		—
1870	221		—
U.S. Decennial Census

Rome appeared only once in the U.S. Census as a separately-returned community, when in 1870 it had a population of 221. However, in 1850 an estimate published by the Census placed the population at approximately 349 inhabitants, and by 1854 the Census Office further estimated that the population had risen to 600 people.

== See also ==
- List of cities and towns along the Ohio River
