= Gatchel, Indiana =

- Unincorporated community
- Location within Indiana Location within the United States
- Coordinates: 38°02′48″N 86°39′02″W
- Country: United States
- State: Indiana
- County: Perry
- Township: Anderson
- Elevation: 715 ft (218 m)
- Time zone: UTC-6 (Central (CST))
  - Summer (DST): UTC-5 (CDT)
- ZIP code: 47586
- Area codes: 812, 930
- GNIS feature ID: 450948

Gatchel is an unincorporated community in Anderson Township, Perry County, in the U.S. state of Indiana.

== History ==
A post office was established at Gatchel in 1895, and remained in operation until it was discontinued in 1944. Roy Gatchell is said to have served as an early postmaster, according to local history.
