= Anderson Township, Perry County, Indiana =

Anderson Township
- Township
- Location in Perry County
- Coordinates: 38°02′47″N 86°42′23″W
- Country: United States
- State: Indiana
- County: Perry

Government
  - Type: Indiana township

Area
  - Total: 59.5 sq mi (154 km^{2})
  - Land: 59.44 sq mi (153.9 km^{2})
  - Water: 0.06 sq mi (0.16 km^{2}) 0.10%
- Elevation: 410 ft (125 m)

Population (2020)
  - Total: 1,603
  - Density: 26.97/sq mi (10.41/km^{2})
- ZIP codes: 47515, 47520, 47577, 47586
- GNIS feature ID: 453088

Anderson Township is one of seven townships in Perry County, Indiana, United States. As of the 2020 census, its population was 1,603 and it contained 649 housing units.

Historical population
Census	Pop.	Note	%±
1890	1,990		—
1900	1,847		−7.2%
1910	1,540		−16.6%
1920	1,321		−14.2%
1930	1,193		−9.7%
1940	1,243		4.2%
1950	1,088		−12.5%
1960	1,038		−4.6%
1970	1,105		6.5%
1980	1,359		23.0%
1990	1,340		−1.4%
2000	1,536		14.6%
2010	1,557		1.4%
2020	1,603		3.0%
Source: US Decennial Census

== History ==
Anderson Township was named after the Anderson River.

The Huffman Mill Covered Bridge was listed on the National Register of Historic Places in 1998.

== Geography ==
According to the 2010 census, the township has a total area of 59.5 square miles (154 km^{2}), of which 59.44 square miles (153.9 km^{2}) (or 99.90%) is land and 0.06 square miles (0.16 km^{2}) (or 0.10%) is water.

=== Unincorporated towns ===
- Gatchel at 38.046726°N 86.650540°W
- Lilly Dale at 38.011726°N 86.651373°W
- Ranger at 38.095892°N 86.685542°W

(This list is based on USGS data and may include former settlements.)

=== Cemeteries ===
The township contains these thirteen cemeteries: Avery, Covey, Davis, Dodson, Frakes, Hammack, Hicks, Mackey, Niles, Nixon, Richards, Slaughter and Terry.

=== Major highways ===
- Indiana State Road 37

=== Airports and landing strips ===
- Perry County Municipal Airport

=== Lakes ===
- Saddle Lake

== School districts ==
- Perry Central Community School Corporation
- Tell City-Troy Township School Corporation

== Political districts ==
- State House District 73
- State House District 74
- State Senate District 47
