= Hardingrove, Indiana =

- Unincorporated community
- Location within Indiana Location within the United States
- Coordinates: 37°55′37″N 86°34′17″W
- Country: United States
- State: Indiana
- County: Perry
- Township: Tobin
- Elevation: 420 ft (130 m)
- Time zone: UTC-6 (Central (CST))
  - Summer (DST): UTC-5 (CDT)
- ZIP code: 47574
- Area codes: 812, 930
- GNIS feature ID: 451663

Hardingrove is an unincorporated community in Tobin Township, Perry County, in the U.S. state of Indiana.

== History ==
Hardingrove was settled by members of the Hardin family, and an old variant rendering of the name is "Hardin Grove". A post office was established at Hardingrove in 1893, and remained in operation until it was discontinued in 1937. Louise Hardin served as an early postmaster.
