= Andrew Jacobs Sr. =

American politician (1906–1992)

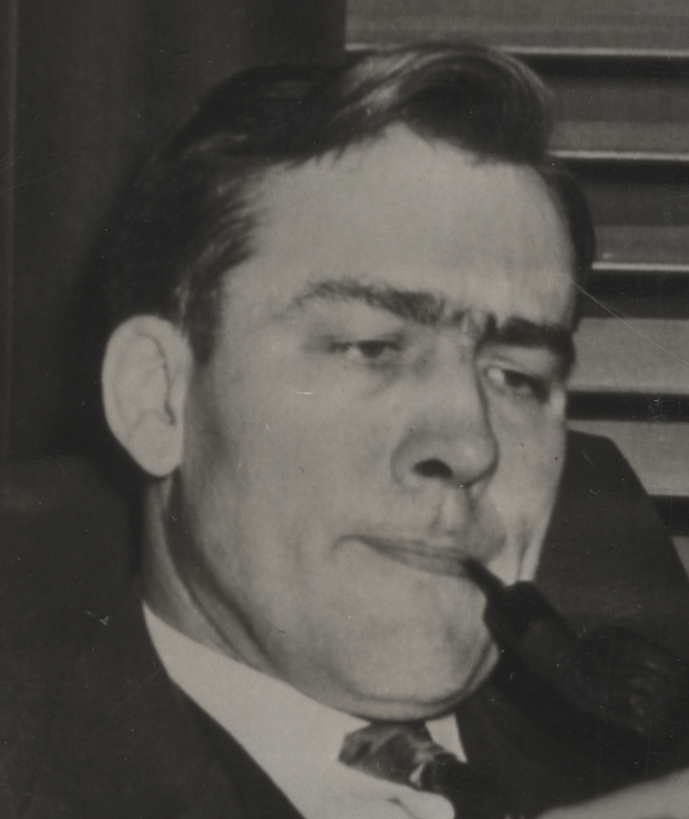

Member of the U.S. House of Representatives from Indiana's 11th district
- In office January 3, 1949 – January 3, 1951
- Preceded by: Louis Ludlow
- Succeeded by: Charles B. Brownson

Personal details
- Born: February 22, 1906 Gerald, Indiana, U.S.
- Died: December 17, 1992 (aged 86) Indianapolis, Indiana, U.S.
- Party: Democratic
- Children: Andrew Jacobs Jr.
- Education: Benedictine College; Benjamin Harrison Law School
- Occupation: Attorney

Andrew Jacobs Sr. (February 22, 1906 – December 17, 1992) was a Democratic politician and attorney from Indiana who served as a U.S. representative for Indiana's 11th congressional district from 1949 to 1951.

== Early life ==
James Andrew Jacobs was born near Gerald, Indiana, and attended St. Benedict's College in Atchison, Kansas. He later attended the Benjamin Harrison Law School, graduating at the top of his class in 1928 after previously being admitted to the bar in 1927. He entered private practice in Indianapolis and was appointed as one of the Criminal Court's attorneys for the poor by Judge Frank P. Baker in 1930. In 1937, when factory workers at a General Motors plant in Anderson, Indiana, were indicted on riot charges during a strike, Andrews defended them.

In 1938, Jacobs ran for Prosecuting Attorney in the Nineteenth Circuit, which included Marion County. He ran against David M. Lewis, a former prosecutor in the office, in the Democratic primary. During the campaign, Jacobs ran with the support of the "Machine Busters" campaign, which sought to oppose the county party establishment. When the party failed to schedule a debate between the two candidates, which Jacobs alleged was a "conspiracy of silence" meant to aid Lewis, and he filed a lawsuit seeking to prevent the party from running slates of candidates in the primary. Ultimately, however, Jacobs lost the nomination to Lewis in a landslide, winning just 29% of the vote.

== U.S. House of Representatives ==
In 1948, Jacobs initially announced that he would again run for Nineteenth Circuit Prosecuting Attorney, but when longtime Congressman Louis Ludlow announced that he would not seek an eleventh term, Jacobs entered the race to succeed him. He was opposed in the Democratic primary by two other Indianapolis-area attorneys, Raymond Murray and Chester Carter, and veteran Carl Lutz. Jacobs ultimately won the primary in a landslide with 67% of the vote. In the general election, he faced former Indianapolis Mayor George L. Denny, the Republican nominee. The race appeared close for most of the campaign, with polling in late October showing Jacobs win a thin lead over Denny. Jacobs ended up narrowly defeating Denny, winning 51% of the vote to Denny's 48%, as Republican presidential nominee Thomas E. Dewey narrowly won the district and state over President Harry S. Truman.

Jacobs courted support for the Democratic nomination for the U.S. Senate in 1950 which was to be decided at a party convention that June. On June 4, 1950, Andrews announced his candidacy and ran against Alexander M. Campbell, the former United States Attorney for the Northern District of Indiana, and Charles C. Price, a chemistry professor at the University of Notre Dame. However, when labor unions lined up behind Campbell, he quickly emerged as the frontrunner. At the June 27 convention, Campbell won the nomination handily, winning 1,453 votes to Jacobs's 363 and Price's 207.

Accordingly, Jacobs ran for re-election to his congressional seat. He was opposed by Republican Charles B. Brownson, a World War II veteran and Commander in the American Legion. Amidst nationwide Democratic losses that year, Jacobs lost to Brownson in a landslide, winning just 43% of the vote to Brownson's 56%.

== Post-congressional career ==
Though Jacobs was mentioned as a potential candidate for the U.S. Senate in 1952 and for Prosecuting Attorney in 1954, he did not seek either office. Instead, he resumed the practice of law and remained active in local Democratic politics, including as a supporter of Estes Kefauver's 1952 and 1956 presidential campaigns.

In 1974, Jacobs announced that he would run for Marion County Criminal Court against incumbent Republican Judge Harold H. Kohlmeyer. He defeated former local prosecutor Robert Maher in the Democratic primary with 88% of the vote, and faced Judge Kohlmeyer in the general election. Owing in part to a strong performance by Democrats nationwide and in Indiana, Jacobs unseated Kohlmeyer, winning 55% of the vote to Kohlmeyer's 45%.

On the bench he "quickly earned a reputation as a tough judge, causing many defendants to seek reassignment from his courtroom." In 1975, half of Jacobs's cases saw defendants make change-of-judge requests, many of which he denied. When one such request was appealed to the Indiana Supreme Court in 1976, with the defense attorney arguing that Jacobs had no discretion to any change-of-judge request, Jacobs threatened to quit if the court reversed him. The court ultimately ordered that requests must be granted, but initiated a review of the underlying rule, which prompted Jacobs to resign, noting, "It would be the height of dishonor for me to stay here with that rule in effect. I'm not going to be a part of any such charade." Governor Otis Bowen urged Jacobs to reconsider, which he ultimately did, noting, that he "perceive[d] a duty to be here to see what can be done" about the disputed rule. The next year, however, the same issue presented itself again. When the court again ordered Jacobs to grant similar change-of-judge requests, he resigned, declaring, "I can no longer stand a system where the State Supreme Court rewrites its rules to favor the criminals."

In 1978, when incumbent Marion County Prosecuting Attorney James Kelley declined to seek re-election, Jacobs announced that he would run to succeed him. He faced former deputy state attorney general Kenneth Kern in the Democratic primary, but handily defeated him, winning 89% of the vote. In the general election, Jacobs faced Stephen Goldsmith, the Republican nominee, which he described as race between "a juvenile and a senile." During the campaign, Jacobs struck a harsh tone, observing, "It's time to recognize that criminals are warring on us and exercise the rights of belligerence against them." Goldsmith, in turn, noted, "No one talks tougher on crime than my opponent," but favored a more balanced approach. Ultimately, despite early predictions that Jacobs would win, Goldsmith significantly outspent him and waged a modern campaign "based on expensive television advertising, door-to-door canvassing and a large volunteer organization," in contrast to Jacob's "Victorian style, " which enabled him to narrowly prevail, winning 53% of the vote to Jacobs's 47%.

== Personal life ==
Jacobs's son, Andrew Jacobs Jr., also served as a member of Congress from Indiana from 1965 to 1973 and from 1975 to 1997.
