= Dexter, Indiana =

- Unincorporated community
- Location within Indiana Location within the United States
- Coordinates: 38°03′33″N 86°28′43″W
- Country: United States
- State: Indiana
- County: Perry
- Township: Union
- Elevation: 427 ft (130 m)
- Time zone: UTC-6 (Central (CST))
  - Summer (DST): UTC-5 (CDT)
- ZIP code: 47520
- Area codes: 812, 930
- GNIS feature ID: 450847

Dexter is an unincorporated community in Union Township, Perry County, in the U.S. state of Indiana.

== History ==
A post office was established at Dexter in 1870, and remained in operation until it was discontinued in 1948.
