= Clark Township, Perry County, Indiana =

Clark Township
- Township
- Location in Perry County
- Coordinates: 38°11′02″N 86°43′02″W
- Country: United States
- State: Indiana
- County: Perry

Government
  - Type: Indiana township

Area
  - Total: 74.84 sq mi (193.8 km^{2})
  - Land: 74.59 sq mi (193.2 km^{2})
  - Water: 0.26 sq mi (0.67 km^{2}) 0.35%
- Elevation: 560 ft (170 m)

Population (2020)
  - Total: 1,063
  - Density: 14.25/sq mi (5.502/km^{2})
- ZIP codes: 47118, 47513, 47515, 47532, 47576, 47577, 47586
- GNIS feature ID: 453203

Clark Township is one of seven townships in Perry County, Indiana, United States. As of the 2020 census, its population was 1,063 and it contained 489 housing units.

Historical population
Census	Pop.	Note	%±
1890	2,432		—
1900	2,616		7.6%
1910	2,391		−8.6%
1920	1,987		−16.9%
1930	1,607		−19.1%
1940	1,631		1.5%
1950	1,301		−20.2%
1960	1,144		−12.1%
1970	1,126		−1.6%
1980	1,111		−1.3%
1990	1,136		2.3%
2000	1,250		10.0%
2010	1,180		−5.6%
2020	1,063		−9.9%
Source: US Decennial Census

== History ==
Clark Township was named for Robert Clark, a pioneer settler.

== Geography ==
According to the 2010 census, the township has a total area of 74.84 square miles (193.8 km^{2}), of which 74.59 square miles (193.2 km^{2}) (or 99.67%) is land and 0.26 square miles (0.67 km^{2}) (or 0.35%) is water.

=== Unincorporated towns ===
- Adyeville at 38.19089°N 86.769435°W
- Bristow at 38.140057°N 86.721655°W
- Fosters Ridge at 38.232836°N 86.662487°W
- Kitterman Corners at 38.222558°N 86.697488°W
- Saint Josephs Shrine at 38.168112°N 86.797769°W
- Sassafras at 38.188391°N 86.690266°W
- Siberia at 38.238113°N 86.733601°W
- Uniontown at 38.225336°N 86.660821°W

(This list is based on USGS data and may include former settlements.)

=== Cemeteries ===
The township contains these fourteen cemeteries: Beard, Comstock, Crooks Thom, Enlow, Fox Ridge, Hobbs, Lanman, Lasher, Mount Pleasant, Sigler, Sigler, Stapleton, Taylor and Tenn Beard.

=== Major highways ===
- Interstate 64
- Indiana State Road 145

== School districts ==
- Perry Central Community School Corporation

== Political districts ==
- State House District 73
- State House District 74
- State Senate District 47
