= Anderson River (Indiana) =

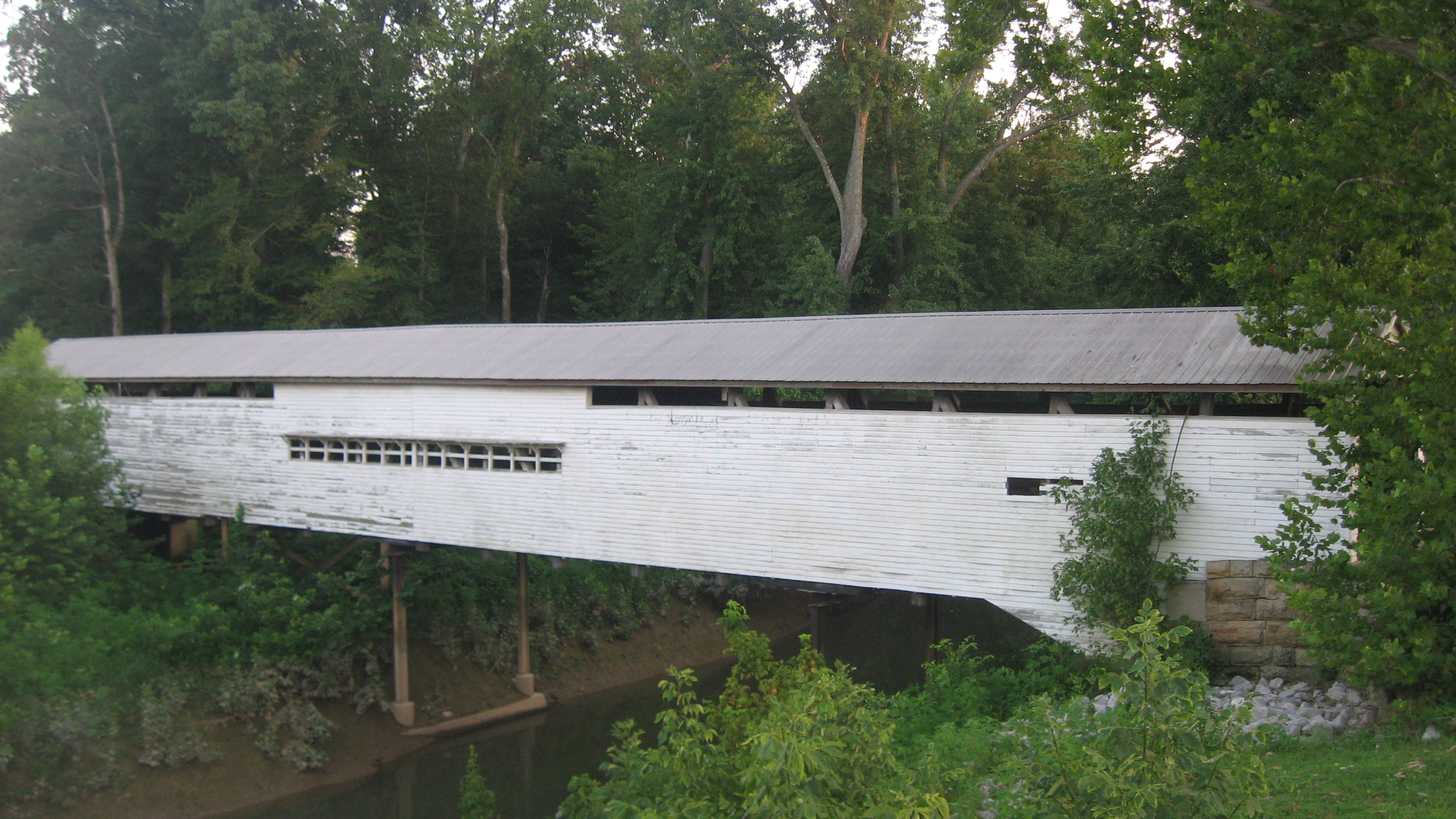
- A covered bridge over the river, along the Perry/Spencer county line

Physical characteristics
- Source
  - location: Johnson Township, Crawford County, Indiana
  - coordinates: 38°18′57″N 86°36′51″W
  - elevation: 815 ft (248 m)
- Mouth
  - location: Confluence with the Ohio River at Troy, Indiana
  - coordinates: 37°59′55″N 86°48′34″W
  - elevation: 390 ft (120 m)
- Length: 50 mi (80 km)

Basin features
- Progression: Anderson River → Ohio → Mississippi → Gulf of Mexico
- GNIS ID: 450631

The Anderson River is a 50.4-mile-long (81.1 km) tributary of the Ohio River in southern Indiana in the United States. Via the Ohio, it is part of the watershed of the Mississippi River.

The Anderson rises in western Crawford County in the Hoosier National Forest and flows generally southwardly through southeastern Dubois County and along the common boundary of Perry and Spencer counties, east of the town of Saint Meinrad. It joins the Ohio River just downstream of the town of Troy.

Near its mouth it collects the Middle Fork Anderson River, which flows for its entire length in Perry County.

== See also ==
- List of Indiana rivers
