= Union Township, Perry County, Indiana =

Union Township
- Township
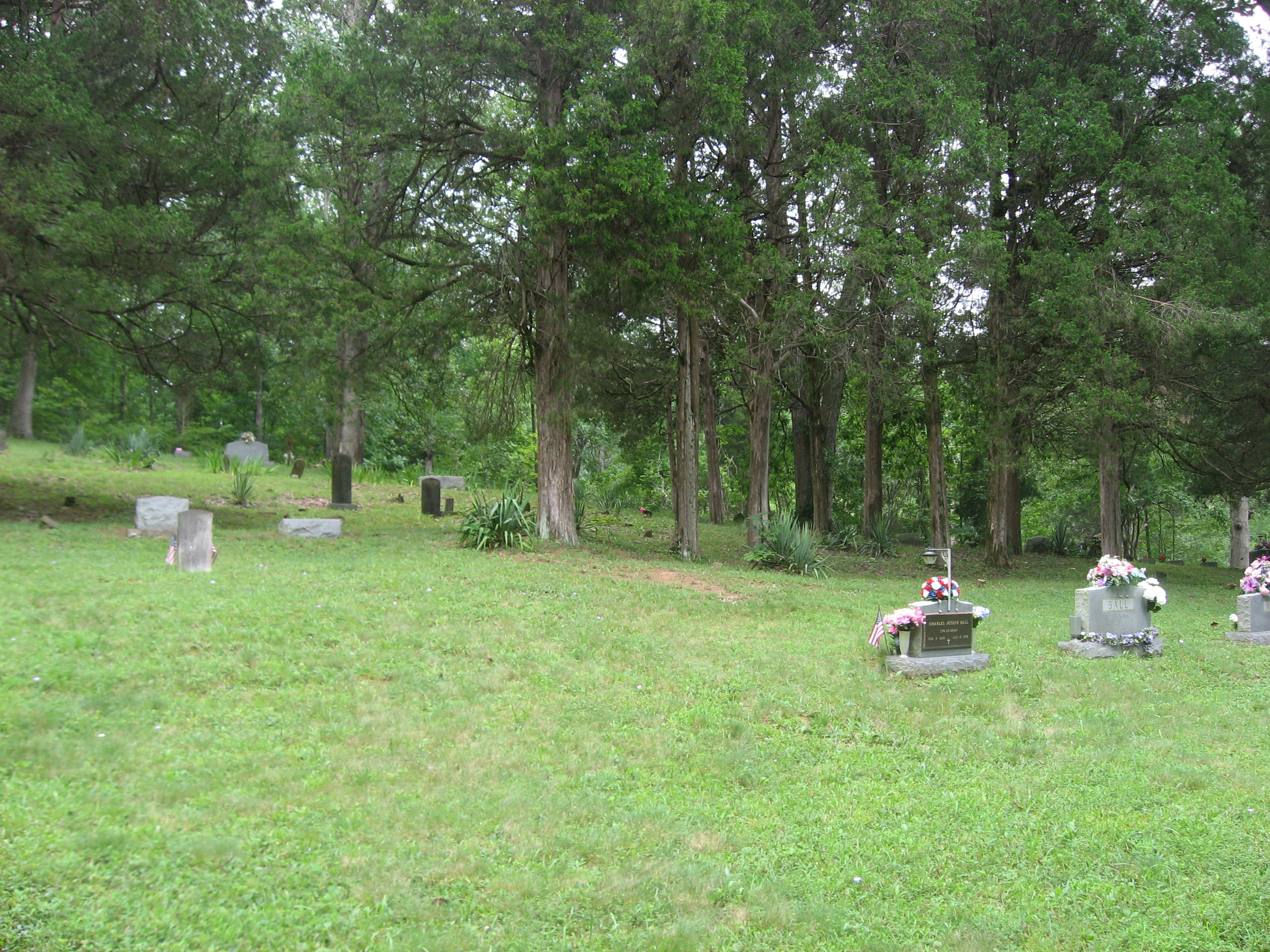
- The Phelps Cemetery in the township's southwest

- Location in Perry County
- Coordinates: 38°04′05″N 86°30′39″W
- Country: United States
- State: Indiana
- County: Perry

Government
  - Type: Indiana township

Area
  - Total: 43.12 sq mi (111.7 km^{2})
  - Land: 42.27 sq mi (109.5 km^{2})
  - Water: 0.85 sq mi (2.2 km^{2}) 1.97%
- Elevation: 381 ft (116 m)

Population (2020)
  - Total: 591
  - Density: 14.0/sq mi (5.40/km^{2})
- ZIP codes: 47520, 47525, 47551, 47586
- GNIS feature ID: 453929

Union Township is one of seven townships in Perry County, Indiana, United States. As of the 2020 census, its population was 591 and it contained 287 housing units.

Historical population
| Census | Pop. | Note | %± |
|---|---|---|---|
| 1890 | 1,616 | | — |
| 1900 | 1,490 | | −7.8% |
| 1910 | 1,432 | | −3.9% |
| 1920 | 1,276 | | −10.9% |
| 1930 | 896 | | −29.8% |
| 1940 | 960 | | 7.1% |
| 1950 | 737 | | −23.2% |
| 1960 | 612 | | −17.0% |
| 1970 | 540 | | −11.8% |
| 1980 | 541 | | 0.2% |
| 1990 | 512 | | −5.4% |
| 2000 | 523 | | 2.1% |
| 2010 | 557 | | 6.5% |
| 2020 | 591 | | 6.1% |
Source: US Decennial Census

== History ==
The Rockhouse Cliffs Rock Shelters was listed on the National Register of Historic Places in 1986.

== Geography ==
According to the 2010 census, the township has a total area of 43.12 square miles (111.7 km^{2}), of which 42.27 square miles (109.5 km^{2}) (or 98.03%) is land and 0.85 square miles (2.2 km^{2}) (or 1.97%) is water.

=== Unincorporated towns ===
- Derby at 38.03034°N 86.527202°W
- Dexter at 38.05923°N 86.47859°W
- Magnet at 38.09673°N 86.463312°W
- Mount Pleasant at 38.121729°N 86.517759°W

(This list is based on USGS data and may include former settlements.)

=== Cemeteries ===
The township contains these seven cemeteries: Badger, Derby, Horton, Old Chapel, Phelps, Stephenson and Talley.

=== Major highways ===
- Indiana State Road 37

== School districts ==
- Perry Central Community School Corporation

== Political districts ==
- State House District 73
- State House District 74
- State Senate District 47
