= Gerald, Indiana =

- Unincorporated community
- Location within Indiana Location within the United States
- Coordinates: 38°00′27″N 86°34′23″W
- Country: United States
- State: Indiana
- County: Perry
- Township: Tobin
- Elevation: 430 ft (130 m)
- Time zone: UTC-6 (Central (CST))
  - Summer (DST): UTC-5 (CDT)
- ZIP code: 47525
- Area codes: 812, 930
- GNIS feature ID: 450951

Gerald is an unincorporated community in Tobin Township, Perry County, in the U.S. state of Indiana.

== History ==
A post office was established at Gerald in 1905, and remained in operation until it was discontinued in 1955.

== Notable person ==
- Andrew Jacobs Sr. (1906–1992), Democratic Congressman
