= Lilly Dale, Indiana =

- Unincorporated community
- Location within Indiana Location within the United States
- Coordinates: 38°00′42″N 86°39′05″W
- Country: United States
- State: Indiana
- County: Perry
- Township: Anderson
- Elevation: 453 ft (138 m)
- Time zone: UTC-6 (Central (CST))
  - Summer (DST): UTC-5 (CDT)
- ZIP code: 47586
- Area codes: 812, 930
- GNIS feature ID: 451144

Lilly Dale is an unincorporated community in Anderson Township, Perry County, in the U.S. state of Indiana.

== History ==
A post office was established at Lilly Dale in 1855, and remained in operation until it was discontinued in 1918.
