= Adyeville, Indiana =

- Unincorporated community
- Location within Indiana Location within the United States
- Coordinates: 38°11′27″N 86°46′10″W
- Country: United States
- State: Indiana
- County: Perry
- Township: Clark
- Elevation: 420 ft (130 m)
- Time zone: UTC-6 (Central (CST))
  - Summer (DST): UTC-5 (CDT)
- ZIP code: 47515
- Area codes: 812, 930
- GNIS feature ID: 430024

Adyeville is an unincorporated community in Clark Township, Perry County, in the U.S. state of Indiana.

== History ==
A post office was established at Adyeville in 1862, and remained in operation until 1966. Andrew J. Adye, the first postmaster, gave the community his name. Adyeville was platted in 1873.
