= Siberia, Indiana =

- Unincorporated community
- Location within Indiana Location within the United States
- Coordinates: 38°14′17″N 86°44′01″W
- Country: United States
- State: Indiana
- County: Perry
- Township: Clark
- Elevation: 581 ft (177 m)
- Time zone: UTC-6 (Central (CST))
  - Summer (DST): UTC-5 (CDT)
- ZIP code: 47515
- Area codes: 812, 930
- GNIS feature ID: 451460

Siberia is an unincorporated community in Clark Township, Perry County, in the U.S. state of Indiana.

== History ==
Siberia was platted in 1869. According to legend, the town was originally going to be named Sabaria, after the place where Saint Martin of Tours was born. However, a Post Office Department employee designated the new community as Siberia, thinking "Sabaria" was a misspelling and the platter was referring to Siberia, a region of Russia, and the name stuck.

A post office was established at Siberia in 1883, and remained in operation until it was discontinued in 1983.
