= Tobin Township, Perry County, Indiana =

Tobin Township
- Township
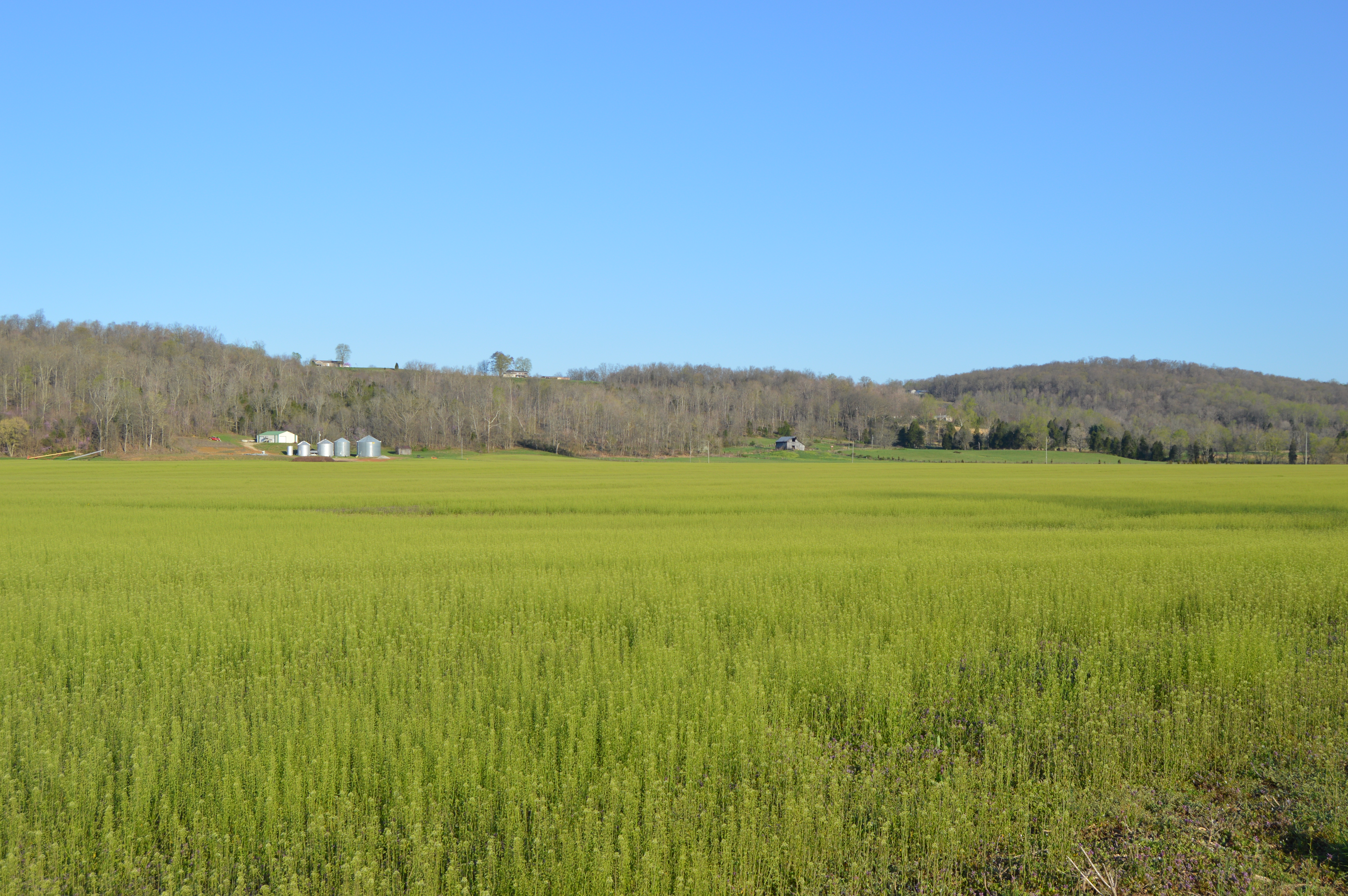
- Along State Road 66 north of Rome

- Location in Perry County
- Coordinates: 37°57′17″N 86°35′37″W
- Country: United States
- State: Indiana
- County: Perry

Government
  - Type: Indiana township

Area
  - Total: 65.55 sq mi (169.8 km^{2})
  - Land: 63.91 sq mi (165.5 km^{2})
  - Water: 1.65 sq mi (4.3 km^{2}) 2.52%
- Elevation: 538 ft (164 m)

Population (2020)
  - Total: 690
  - Density: 11/sq mi (4.2/km^{2})
- ZIP codes: 47520, 47525, 47574, 47586
- GNIS feature ID: 453900

Tobin Township is one of seven townships in Perry County, Indiana, United States. As of the 2020 census, its population was 690 and it contained 383 housing units.

Historical population
Census	Pop.	Note	%±
1890	2,315		—
1900	2,272		−1.9%
1910	1,824		−19.7%
1920	1,584		−13.2%
1930	1,393		−12.1%
1940	1,312		−5.8%
1950	1,002		−23.6%
1960	726		−27.5%
1970	776		6.9%
1980	901		16.1%
1990	684		−24.1%
2000	709		3.7%
2010	768		8.3%
2020	690		−10.2%
Source: US Decennial Census

== History ==
Several members of the Tobin family were among the pioneer settlers who arrived to Tobin Township in the 1810s.

The crash of Northwest Orient Airlines Flight 710, which killed 63 people on March 17, 1960, occurred in Tobin Township.

The Old Perry County Courthouse was listed on the National Register of Historic Places in 1981.

== Geography ==
According to the 2010 census, the township has a total area of 65.55 square miles (169.8 km^{2}), of which 63.91 square miles (165.5 km^{2}) (or 97.50%) is land and 1.65 square miles (4.3 km^{2}) (or 2.52%) is water.

=== Unincorporated towns ===
- Dodd at 37.91228°N 86.651929°W
- Gerald at 38.007561°N 86.573037°W
- Hardingrove at 37.927004°N 86.57137°W
- Lauer at 37.879225°N 86.601649°W
- Rome at 37.923394°N 86.523591°W
- Tobinsport at 37.852557°N 86.635539°W

(This list is based on USGS data and may include former settlements.)

=== Cemeteries ===
The township contains these twenty cemeteries: Brashear, Bryant, Carr, Cockrell-Tate, Conner, Connor, Cooks, David Tate, George Tate, German Ridge, Gilliand, Groves, Harding, Hiley, Lamb, Lamb, Lower Cummings, Maier, Miller, Robinson, Saint Johns, Saint Peters, Sampley, Schraner, Seibert, Shoemaker, Simons, Smith, Tate, Upper Cummings and Wegenast.

== School districts ==
- Perry Central Community School Corporation

== Political districts ==
- State House District 74
- State Senate District 47
