= Ranger, Indiana =

- Unincorporated community
- Location within Indiana Location within the United States
- Coordinates: 38°05′45″N 86°41′08″W
- Country: United States
- State: Indiana
- County: Perry
- Township: Anderson
- Elevation: 423 ft (129 m)
- Time zone: UTC-6 (Central (CST))
  - Summer (DST): UTC-5 (CDT)
- ZIP code: 47586
- Area codes: 812, 930
- GNIS feature ID: 451379

Ranger was an unincorporated community served by a post office in Anderson Township, Perry County, in the U.S. state of Indiana.

== History ==
The post office was established at Ranger on 27 November 1866 by Henry Rhodes. The post office was headed by postmasters in one family for 73 years starting with Henry Rhodes in 1886 until the retirement of Leroy Gatchel on 31 January 1940. The post office was closed in 1956 on 24 February 1956 as part of a county-lead streamlining process. Addresses previously serviced by the Ranger Post Office were to be served by Star Route, Troy, Indiana.
