= Kitterman Corners, Indiana =

- Unincorporated community
- Location within Indiana Location within the United States
- Coordinates: 38°13′21″N 86°41′51″W
- Country: United States
- State: Indiana
- County: Perry
- Township: Clark
- Elevation: 443 ft (135 m)
- Time zone: UTC-6 (Central (CST))
  - Summer (DST): UTC-5 (CDT)
- ZIP code: 47515
- Area codes: 812, 930
- GNIS feature ID: 451118

Kitterman Corners is an unincorporated community in Clark Township, Perry County, in the U.S. state of Indiana.

== Geography ==
Kitterman Corners is located at the intersection of State Roads 145 and 62.
