= Bristow, Indiana =

- Unincorporated community
- Location within Indiana Location within the United States
- Coordinates: 38°08′24″N 86°43′18″W
- Country: United States
- State: Indiana
- County: Perry
- Township: Clark
- Elevation: 413 ft (126 m)
- Time zone: UTC-6 (Central (CST))
  - Summer (DST): UTC-5 (CDT)
- ZIP code: 47515
- Area codes: 812, 930
- GNIS feature ID: 450712

Bristow is an unincorporated community in Clark Township, Perry County, in the U.S. state of Indiana.

== History ==
Bristow was platted in 1875. The name Bristow honors a family of early settlers. A post office has been in operation at Bristow since 1879.
