= Tobinsport, Indiana =

- Unincorporated community
- Location within Indiana Location within the United States
- Coordinates: 37°51′09″N 86°38′08″W
- Country: United States
- State: Indiana
- County: Perry
- Township: Tobin
- Elevation: 404 ft (123 m)
- Time zone: UTC-6 (Central (CST))
  - Summer (DST): UTC-5 (CDT)
- ZIP code: 47520
- Area codes: 812, 930
- GNIS feature ID: 444792

Tobinsport is a small town located along the Ohio River in Tobin Township, Perry County, in the U.S. state of Indiana. Directly across the river is Cloverport, Kentucky. It is at the southernmost point of Perry County.

== History ==
The community was initially settled in the late 1700s.

The town also has a long-standing church, the Clayton Memorial Harris Church, which was founded in 1856.

In 1975, the last remaining store in Tobinsport was closed: David Adam's Lincoln Hills Trading Center.

== Post offices ==
There were 3 post offices in the Tobinsport area throughout its history: the Tobinsport post office, the Lauer post office and the Dodd post office.

The Tobinsport post office was established on 20 November 1873 and its first postmaster was Zalmon Tousey. There may have been an earlier post office established in 1865 with postmaster Robert Tobin. It is the southern-most post office in the state of Indiana.

The Lauer post office was established on either 15 September 1930 or 19 June 1930 and was discontinued on 15 December 1945. For its entire time of operation, it was headed by postmistress Mittie Lauer. After its closure, the routes it served were shifted to the Tobinsport office. The area around the Lauer post office was sometimes referred to as a "community" or "neighborhood" and postmistress Mittie Lauer wrote a long-standing column about the area for The Perry County News.

The Dodd post office was first established on 19 Mar 1898 and was discontinued on 30 June 1904. It was later reestablished on 12 January 1912 and then discontinued a second time on 30 November 1935. A member of the Dodd family served as an early postmaster.

== Education ==
Tobin Township is in the Perry Central Community School Corporation.

At its peak, Tobinsport had as many as three schools: the Tobinsport, Finch and Harmony schools. It also had a school called the Spring Normal School which was said to have "produced many good teachers".

Prior to 1962, Tobinsport had its own high school. The school colors were blue and white, and the mascot was the Pirates. That year, it merged into Perry Central High School.

== See also ==
- List of cities and towns along the Ohio River
