= Old Perry County Courthouse (Rome, Indiana) =

- U.S. National Register of Historic Places
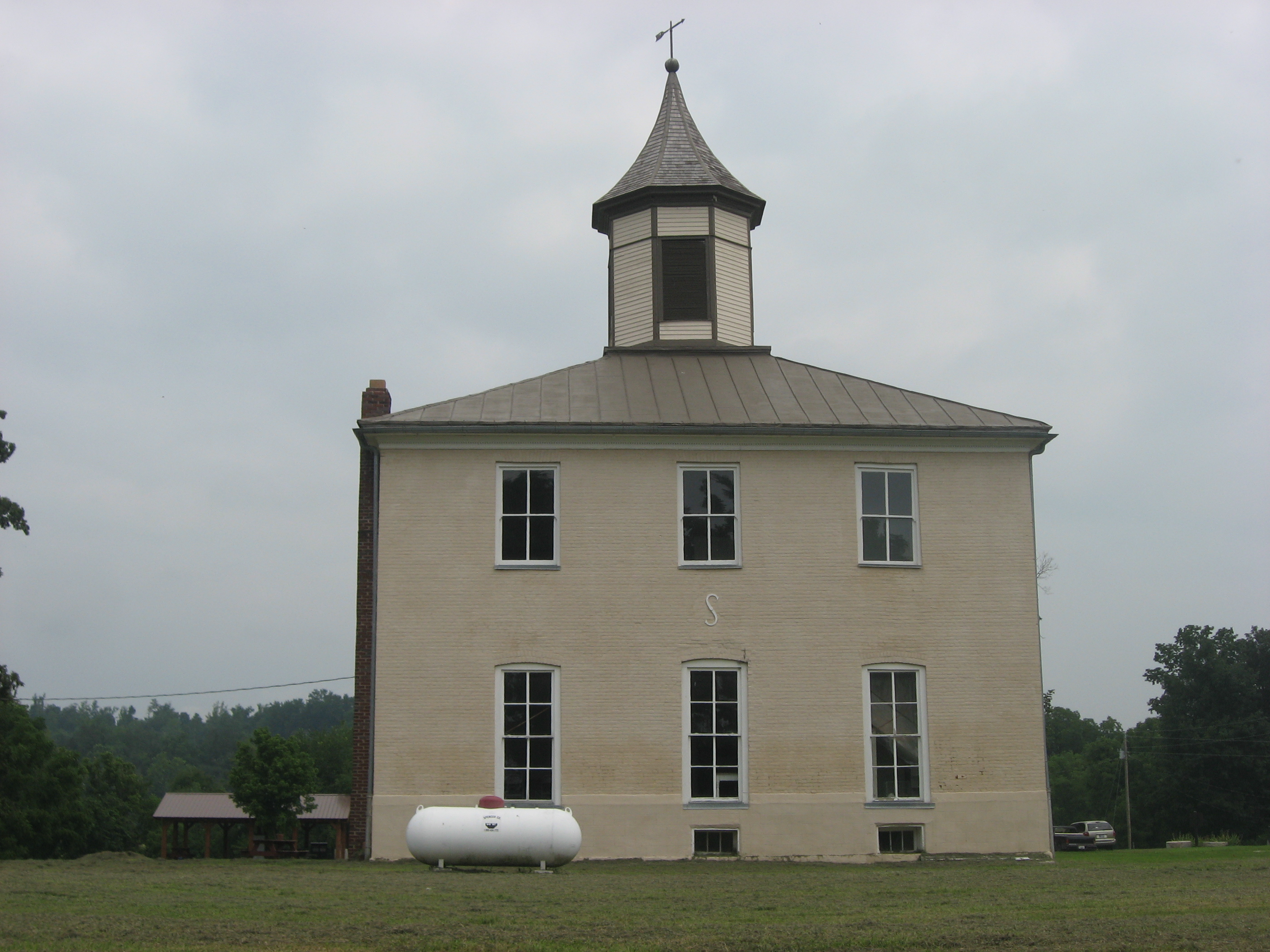
- Old Perry County Courthouse, July 2011

- Location within Indiana Location within the United States
- Location: Town Square at Rome, Indiana
- Coordinates: 37°55′25″N 86°31′25″W
- Area: 1.3 acres (0.53 ha)
- Built: 1818
- NRHP reference No.: 81000006
- Added to NRHP: May 12, 1981

Old Perry County Courthouse, also known as Rome Schoolhouse, is a historic courthouse located in Rome, Indiana. It was built in 1818, and is a two-story, square brick building with a hipped roof topped by a central cupola. The building served as the seat of county government until 1859. It then housed a school until 1966.

It was listed on the National Register of Historic Places in 1981.
