= Sassafras, Indiana =

- Unincorporated community
- Location within Indiana Location within the United States
- Coordinates: 38°11′18″N 86°41′25″W
- Country: United States
- State: Indiana
- County: Perry
- Township: Clark
- Elevation: 604 ft (184 m)
- Time zone: UTC-6 (Central (CST))
  - Summer (DST): UTC-5 (CDT)
- ZIP code: 47515
- Area codes: 812, 930
- GNIS feature ID: 451435

Sassafras is an unincorporated community in Clark Township, Perry County, in the U.S. state of Indiana.

== History ==
A post office called Sassafras was established in 1916, and remained in operation until it was discontinued in 1957. The community was named for a grove of sassafras trees near the original town site.
