= Perry County, Indiana =

County in Indiana, United States

- County
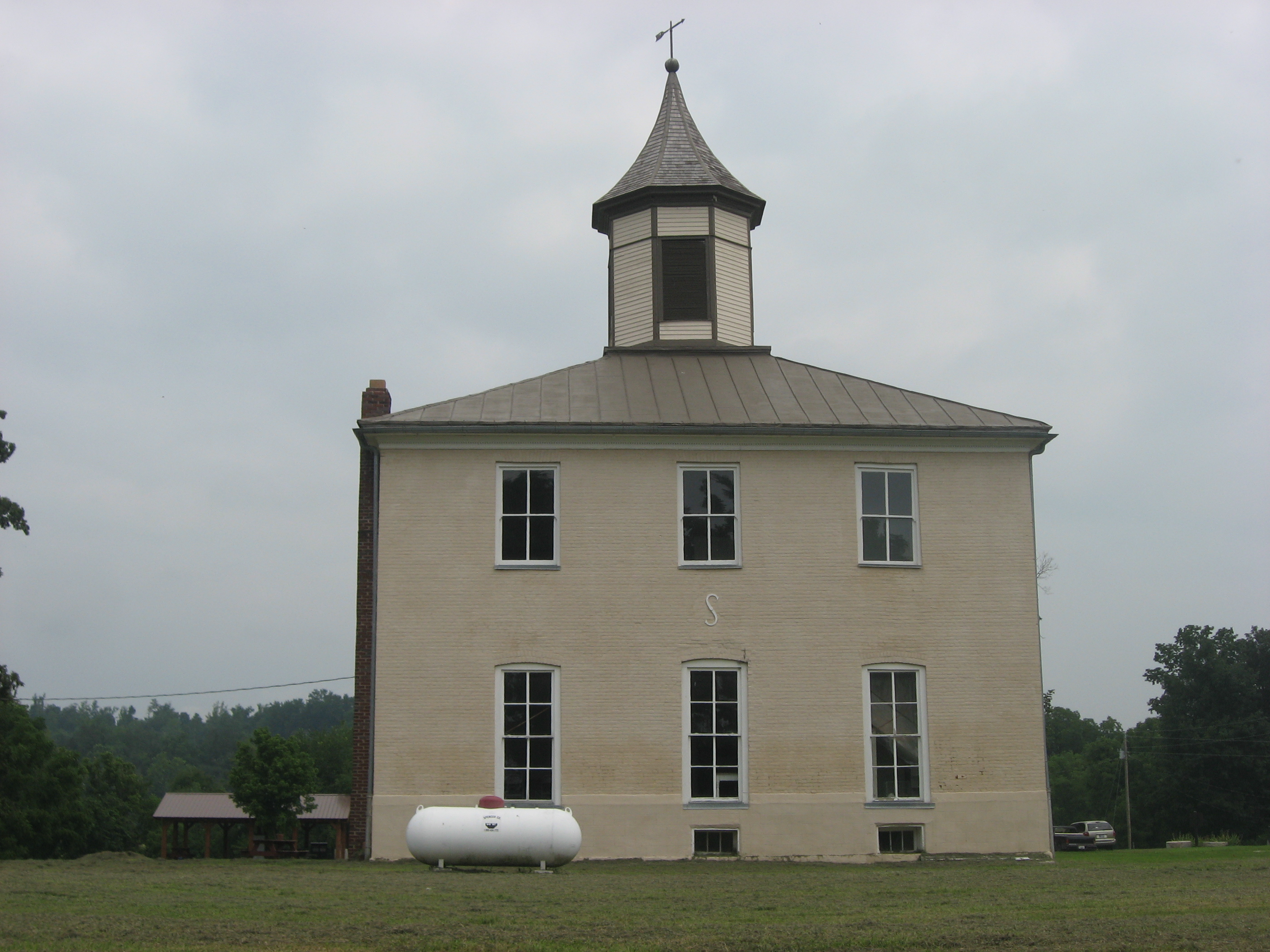
- Old Perry County Courthouse in Rome

- Flag

- Location within the U.S. state of Indiana
- Coordinates: 38°05′N 86°38′W
- Country: United States
- State: Indiana
- Founded: November 1, 1814
- Named for: Oliver Hazard Perry
- Seat: Tell City
- Largest city: Tell City

Area
  - Total: 386.29 sq mi (1,000.5 km^{2})
  - Land: 381.73 sq mi (988.7 km^{2})
  - Water: 4.56 sq mi (11.8 km^{2}) 1.18%

Population (2020)
  - Total: 19,170
  - Estimate (2025): 19,389 ▲
  - Density: 50.22/sq mi (19.39/km^{2})
- Time zone: UTC−6 (Central)
  - Summer (DST): UTC−5 (CDT)
- Congressional district: 8th
- Website: www.perrycounty.in.gov
- Indiana county number 62

Perry County is a county located in the southwestern part of the U.S. state of Indiana. As of 2020, the population was 19,170. The county seat is Tell City. It is the hilliest county as well as one of the most forested counties in Indiana as it features more than 60,000 acres (240 km^{2}) of Hoosier National Forest. The Ohio River Scenic Byway along Indiana State Road 66 runs along the southern border of the county while Interstate 64 traverses the northern portion of the county. Connecting the two is Indiana State Road 37.

The county features three incorporated communities: Tell City (2009 population 7,473), Cannelton (2009 population 1,130) and Troy (2009 population 379). Each is located in Troy Township which is situated along the south western corner of the county.

Coordinated efforts with County officials led to the acquisition of an abandoned rail line that has since been reactivated as the County-owned Hoosier Southern Railroad. Managed by the Perry County Port Authority, the 22-mile (35 km) short-line rail road connects the Perry County River Port with the Norfolk Southern Rail Road.

== Climate and weather ==
Tell City, Indiana

Climate chart (precipitation, max. and min. temperature)
J	F	M	A	M	J	J	A	S	O	N	D
3.4 39 24	3.2 45 27	4.5 55 35	4.5 66 44	5.2 75 54	4.3 84 63	4.5 88 68	3.8 86 66	3.4 80 59	3 69 47	4.1 56 38	4 44 29
- █ Average max. and min. temperatures in °F
- █ Precipitation totals in inches
- Source: The Weather Channel
Metric conversion
J	F	M	A	M	J	J	A	S	O	N	D
86 4 −4	81 7 −3	113 13 2	114 19 7	133 24 12	110 29 17	114 31 20	97 30 19	86 27 15	76 21 8	103 13 3	102 7 −2
- █ Average max. and min. temperatures in °C
- █ Precipitation totals in mm

In recent years, average temperatures in Tell City have ranged from a low of 24 °F (−4 °C) in January to a high of 88 °F (31 °C) in July, although a record low of −17 °F (−27 °C) was recorded in January 1985, and a record high of 106 °F (41 °C) was recorded in September 1954. Average monthly precipitation ranged from 2.98 inches (76 mm) in October to 5.22 inches (133 mm) in May.

== Government ==
The county government is a constitutional body, and is granted specific powers by the Constitution of Indiana, and by the Indiana Code.

County Council: The county council is the fiscal body of the county government and controls all the spending and revenue collection in the county. Representatives are elected from county districts. The council members serve four-year terms. They are responsible for setting salaries, the annual budget, and special spending. The council also has limited authority to impose local taxes, in the form of an income and property tax that is subject to state level approval, excise taxes, and service taxes.

Board of Commissioners: The executive and legislative body of the county is made of a board of commissioners. The commissioners are elected county-wide, in staggered terms, and each serves a four-year term. One of the commissioners, typically the most senior, serves as president. The commissioners are charged with managing the day-to-day functions of the county government.

Court: The county maintains a small claims court that can handle some civil cases. The judge on the court is elected to a term of six years and must be a member of the Indiana Bar Association. The judge is assisted by a magistrate who is appointed by the judge. In some cases, court decisions can be appealed to the state level circuit court.

County Officials: The county has several other elected offices, including sheriff, coroner, auditor, treasurer, recorder, surveyor, and circuit court clerk Each of these elected officers serves a term of four years and oversees a different part of county government. Members elected to county government positions are required to declare party affiliations and to be residents of the county.

With its predominately "butternut" cultural background, Perry County has historically and ancestrally heavily favored the Democratic Party at the federal, state and local level, and had a reputation for being one of the few Democratic-leaning counties in heavily Republican Indiana. From 1960 to 2012, Republicans only carried the county in three presidential elections, those being in 1972, 1984 and 2004, all of which saw the Republicans carry Indiana by landslide margins, and the county was still one of the closest counties in the state in all three elections.

The county delivered over 60.5% of its vote to Democratic nominee Barack Obama in 2008, clocking in as the state's fourth most Democratic county that year, before giving Obama nearly 55% of the vote in 2012, being the only county in southern Indiana other than the university county of Monroe to back Obama that year. The county has not backed a Democrat since, with the county delivering 56% of its vote to Republican nominee Donald Trump in 2016 and 61% of its vote to Trump the following election. The county's Republican shift was also shown in the coinciding 2020 gubernatorial election, when it backed Republican incumbent Eric Holcomb for re-election with nearly 64% of the vote, marking the first time a Republican had carried the county in a gubernatorial election since 1952.

Perry County is part of Indiana's 8th congressional district and is represented in Congress by Republican Larry Bucshon.

United States presidential election results for Perry County, Indiana
Year	Republican		Democratic		Third party(ies)	
Year	No.	%	No.	%	No.	%
1888	1,974	49.54%	2,007	50.36%	4	0.10%
1892	1,890	46.28%	2,074	50.78%	120	2.94%
1896	2,139	49.94%	2,109	49.24%	35	0.82%
1900	2,078	47.20%	2,278	51.74%	47	1.07%
1904	2,105	48.89%	2,142	49.74%	59	1.37%
1908	1,903	43.93%	2,356	54.39%	73	1.69%
1912	520	14.25%	1,931	52.90%	1,199	32.85%
1916	1,762	45.11%	2,089	53.48%	55	1.41%
1920	3,864	51.76%	3,560	47.69%	41	0.55%
1924	3,240	44.30%	3,895	53.25%	179	2.45%
1928	3,772	49.89%	3,782	50.02%	7	0.09%
1932	3,253	38.93%	5,053	60.46%	51	0.61%
1936	3,619	41.99%	4,752	55.13%	248	2.88%
1940	4,489	50.00%	4,475	49.84%	14	0.16%
1944	4,087	50.44%	3,996	49.32%	19	0.23%
1948	3,761	45.02%	4,569	54.69%	24	0.29%
1952	4,816	54.53%	4,001	45.30%	15	0.17%
1956	4,946	55.00%	4,037	44.89%	10	0.11%
1960	4,372	46.97%	4,920	52.86%	16	0.17%
1964	3,090	33.08%	6,226	66.65%	25	0.27%
1968	4,211	46.23%	4,343	47.68%	554	6.08%
1972	5,204	54.72%	4,277	44.97%	29	0.30%
1976	4,088	41.95%	5,620	57.66%	38	0.39%
1980	4,350	45.94%	4,540	47.95%	578	6.10%
1984	4,785	49.91%	4,760	49.65%	43	0.45%
1988	4,720	49.27%	4,804	50.15%	56	0.58%
1992	2,973	31.69%	4,829	51.47%	1,580	16.84%
1996	2,554	32.21%	4,427	55.83%	949	11.97%
2000	3,461	46.85%	3,823	51.75%	103	1.39%
2004	4,137	49.75%	4,131	49.68%	47	0.57%
2008	3,202	37.71%	5,141	60.55%	147	1.73%
2012	3,403	43.21%	4,316	54.81%	156	1.98%
2016	4,556	56.30%	3,062	37.84%	474	5.86%
2020	5,345	61.18%	3,203	36.66%	189	2.16%
2024	5,549	63.91%	2,970	34.20%	164	1.89%

== Geography ==
According to the 2010 census, the county has a total area of 386.29 square miles (1,000.5 km^{2}), of which 381.73 square miles (988.7 km^{2}) (or 98.82%) is land and 4.56 square miles (11.8 km^{2}) (or 1.18%) is water.

=== Adjacent counties ===
- Crawford County (north/ET Border)
- Spencer County (west)
- Dubois County (northwest/ET Border)
- Meade County, Kentucky (southeast/ET Border)
- Breckinridge County, Kentucky (South)
- Hancock County, Kentucky (Southwest)

=== Major highways ===
- Interstate 64
- Indiana State Road 37
- Indiana State Road 62
- Indiana State Road 66
- Indiana State Road 70
- Indiana State Road 145
- Indiana State Road 166
- Indiana State Road 545

=== National protected area ===
- Hoosier National Forest (part)

=== Roads and highways ===
Interstate 64 cuts across the northern portion of the county. State Road 66, designated as the Ohio River Scenic Byway for most of its course in the county, is the most heavily traveled road by residents and visitors alike, adjacent to the three most populous towns in the county as well as most major tourist destinations. State Road 37 connects the county to Bloomington and Indianapolis. Other state roads in the county include State Road 62, which closely parallels I-64; State Road 145, which winds through the western parts of the county; State Road 166, which is little more than a road to and from the hamlet of Tobinsport; State Road 237, which connects Cannelton directly to State Road 37 (also the site of a bridge on the Ohio River); a short run of State Road 545 near Troy; and State Road 70 which connects State Road 37 with State Road 66.

== History ==
Perry County was formed on November 1, 1814 (two years before the state of Indiana was admitted to the Union) from Warrick and Gibson Counties. It was named for Commodore Oliver Hazard Perry who defeated the British squadron in the decisive Battle of Lake Erie in 1813. The Ohio River made Perry County a focal point and settlers were drawn here due to plentiful supplies of natural resources and the area's scenic beauty.

== Demographics ==
Historical population
Census	Pop.	Note	%±
1820	2,330		—
1830	3,369		44.6%
1840	4,655		38.2%
1850	7,268		56.1%
1860	11,847		63.0%
1870	14,801		24.9%
1880	16,997		14.8%
1890	18,240		7.3%
1900	18,778		2.9%
1910	18,078		−3.7%
1920	16,692		−7.7%
1930	16,625		−0.4%
1940	17,770		6.9%
1950	17,367		−2.3%
1960	17,232		−0.8%
1970	19,075		10.7%
1980	19,346		1.4%
1990	19,107		−1.2%
2000	18,899		−1.1%
2010	19,338		2.3%
2020	19,170		−0.9%
2025 (est.)	19,389	▲	1.1%
U.S. Decennial Census; 1790-1960 1900-1990; 1990-2000 2010

=== Racial and ethnic composition ===
Perry County, Indiana – Racial and ethnic composition Note: the US Census treats Hispanic/Latino as an ethnic category. This table excludes Latinos from the racial categories and assigns them to a separate category. Hispanics/Latinos may be of any race.
Race / Ethnicity (NH = Non-Hispanic)	Pop 1980	Pop 1990	Pop 2000	Pop 2010	Pop 2020	% 1980	% 1990	% 2000	% 2010	% 2020
White alone (NH)	19,223	18,773	18,345	18,428	17,853	99.36%	98.25%	97.07%	95.29%	93.13%
Black or African American alone (NH)	12	202	272	469	397	0.06%	1.06%	1.44%	2.43%	2.07%
Native American or Alaska Native alone (NH)	24	32	32	34	33	0.12%	0.17%	0.17%	0.18%	0.17%
Asian alone (NH)	26	32	22	69	99	0.13%	0.17%	0.12%	0.36%	0.52%
Native Hawaiian or Pacific Islander alone (NH)	x	x	3	4	3	x	x	0.02%	0.02%	0.02%
Other race alone (NH)	9	2	5	11	46	0.05%	0.01%	0.03%	0.06%	0.24%
Mixed race or Multiracial (NH)	x	x	87	131	519	x	x	0.46%	0.68%	2.71%
Hispanic or Latino (any race)	52	66	133	192	220	0.27%	0.35%	0.70%	0.99%	1.15%
Total	19,346	19,107	18,899	19,338	19,170	100.00%	100.00%	100.00%	100.00%	100.00%

=== 2020 census ===
As of the 2020 census, the county had a population of 19,170. The median age was 42.1 years. 20.6% of residents were under the age of 18 and 19.3% of residents were 65 years of age or older. For every 100 females there were 115.3 males, and for every 100 females age 18 and over there were 116.5 males age 18 and over.

The racial makeup of the county was 93.5% White, 2.1% Black or African American, 0.2% American Indian and Alaska Native, 0.5% Asian, <0.1% Native Hawaiian and Pacific Islander, 0.6% from some other race, and 3.1% from two or more races. Hispanic or Latino residents of any race comprised 1.1% of the population.

45.7% of residents lived in urban areas, while 54.3% lived in rural areas.

There were 7,559 households in the county, of which 27.6% had children under the age of 18 living in them. Of all households, 48.2% were married-couple households, 19.8% were households with a male householder and no spouse or partner present, and 24.5% were households with a female householder and no spouse or partner present. About 31.8% of all households were made up of individuals and 14.7% had someone living alone who was 65 years of age or older.

There were 8,502 housing units, of which 11.1% were vacant. Among occupied housing units, 74.9% were owner-occupied and 25.1% were renter-occupied. The homeowner vacancy rate was 2.0% and the rental vacancy rate was 10.1%.

=== 2010 census ===
As of the 2010 United States census, there were 19,338 people, 7,476 households, and 5,020 families residing in the county. The population density was 50.7 inhabitants per square mile (19.6/km^{2}). There were 8,495 housing units at an average density of 22.3 per square mile (8.6/km^{2}). The racial makeup of the county was 96.0% white, 2.4% black or African American, 0.4% Asian, 0.2% American Indian, 0.3% from other races, and 0.8% from two or more races. Those of Hispanic or Latino origin made up 1.0% of the population. In terms of ancestry, 37.8% were German, 14.4% were Irish, 11.6% were American, and 8.7% were English.

Of the 7,476 households, 30.5% had children under the age of 18 living with them, 52.7% were married couples living together, 9.7% had a female householder with no husband present, 32.9% were non-families, and 28.7% of all households were made up of individuals. The average household size was 2.38 and the average family size was 2.91. The median age was 40.4 years.

The median income for a household in the county was $47,697 and the median income for a family was $55,497. Males had a median income of $42,017 versus $26,301 for females. The per capita income for the county was $20,806. About 6.7% of families and 10.4% of the population were below the poverty line, including 15.9% of those under age 18 and 6.8% of those age 65 or over.

== Cities, towns, and unincorporated communities ==
=== Cities and towns ===
- Cannelton
- Tell City
- Troy

=== Unincorporated communities ===
- Adyeville
- Apalona
- Bandon
- Branchville
- Bristow
- Celina
- Derby
- Dexter
- Dodd
- Doolittle Mills
- Fosters Ridge
- Gatchel
- Gerald
- Hardingrove
- Kitterman Corners
- Leopold
- Lilly Dale
- Magnet
- Mount Pleasant
- Oriole
- Ranger
- Rome
- Saint Croix
- Sassafras
- Siberia
- Tobinsport
- Uniontown

== Townships ==
- Anderson
- Clark
- Leopold
- Oil
- Tobin
- Troy
- Union

== Education ==
School districts include:

- Cannelton City Schools
- Perry Central Community School Corporation
- Tell City-Troy Township School Corporation

== See also ==
- National Register of Historic Places listings in Perry County, Indiana
