= Cannelton =

Cannelton may refer to:

Places

- Cannelton, Indiana, a city in Troy Township, Perry County, Indiana, United States
  - Cannelton Historic District, a National Historic District in Cannelton, Indiana, United States
- Cannelton, Pennsylvania, an unincorporated community in Darlington Township, Beaver County, Pennsylvania, United States
- Cannelton, West Virginia, an unincorporated community in Fayette County, West Virginia, United States

Other

- Cannelton Cotton Mill, also known as Indiana Cotton Mill, a National Historic Landmark in Cannelton, Indiana, United States
- Cannelton High School, a school in Cannelton, Indiana, United States
- Cannelton Locks and Dam, a dam with two locks on the Ohio River in the United States
