= National Register of Historic Places listings in Perry County, Indiana =

Location of Perry County in Indiana

This is a list of the National Register of Historic Places listings in Perry County, Indiana.

This is intended to be a complete list of the properties and districts on the National Register of Historic Places in Perry County, Indiana, United States. Latitude and longitude coordinates are provided for many National Register properties and districts; these locations may be seen together in a map.

There are nine properties and districts listed on the National Register in the county, including one National Historic Landmark. Another property was once listed on the National Register but has been removed.

Properties and districts located in incorporated areas display the name of the municipality, while properties and districts in unincorporated areas display the name of their civil township. Properties and districts split between multiple jurisdictions display the names of all jurisdictions.

This National Park Service list is complete through NPS recent listings posted November 13, 2025.

== Current listings ==
	Name on the Register	Image	Date listed	Location	City or town	Description
1	Cannelton Cotton Mills	Cannelton Cotton Mills	August 22, 1975 (#75000011)	Bounded by Front, 4th, Washington, and Adams Sts. 37°54′41″N 86°44′44″W	Cannelton	
2	Cannelton Historic District	Cannelton Historic District	February 12, 1987 (#87000108)	Roughly bounded by Richardson, Taylor, 1st, and Madison Sts. 37°54′44″N 86°44′35″W	Cannelton	
3	Huffman Mill Covered Bridge	Huffman Mill Covered Bridge	April 1, 1998 (#98000299)	CR 1490N over the Anderson River, east of Fulda; 38°06′14″N 86°46′37″W	Anderson Township	Extends into Spencer County
4	Nester House	Nester House	October 11, 1990 (#90001486)	300 Water St. 37°59′40″N 86°48′19″W	Troy	
5	Old Perry County Courthouse	Old Perry County Courthouse	May 12, 1981 (#81000006)	Town Square at Rome; 37°55′25″N 86°31′25″W	Tobin Township	
6	Rickenbaugh House	Rickenbaugh House	April 6, 1984 (#84001215)	Southwest of St. Croix in the Hoosier National Forest; 38°11′18″N 86°36′44″W	Oil Township	
7	Rockhouse Cliffs Rock Shelters (12PE98; 12PE100)	Rockhouse Cliffs Rock Shelters (12PE98; 12PE100)	April 25, 1986 (#86000918)	About 50 feet (15 m) from the spring in Rockhouse Hollow, northwest of Derby; 38°03′36″N 86°34′40″W	Union Township	
8	St. Luke's Episcopal Church	St. Luke's Episcopal Church	March 3, 1983 (#83000144)	3rd and Washington Sts. 37°54′39″N 86°44′40″W	Cannelton	
9	Tell City Carnegie Library		March 6, 2023 (#100008664)	548 9th St. 37°56′56″N 86°46′07″W	Tell City	

== Former listing ==
	Name on the Register	Image	Date listed	Date removed	Location	City or town	Description
1	Hall of Tell City Lodge, No. 206, IOOF	Hall of Tell City Lodge, No. 206, IOOF	November 27, 1992 (#92001654)	March 22, 2014	701 Main St. 37°57′03″N 86°46′12″W	Tell City	

== See also ==
- List of National Historic Landmarks in Indiana
- National Register of Historic Places listings in Indiana
- Listings in neighboring counties: Breckinridge (KY), Crawford, Dubois, Hancock (KY), Meade (KY), Spencer
- List of Indiana state historical markers in Perry County
