= List of Indiana state historical markers in Perry County =

Location of Perry County in Indiana

This is a list of the Indiana state historical markers in Perry County.

This is intended to be a complete list of the official state historical markers placed in Perry County, Indiana, United States by the Indiana Historical Bureau. The locations of the historical markers and their latitude and longitude coordinates are included below when available, along with their names, years of placement, and topics as recorded by the Historical Bureau. There are 4 historical markers located in Perry County.

== Historical markers ==
Marker title	Image	Year placed	Location	Topics
Abraham S. Fulton		1961	Southwestern corner of the junction of Franklin (State Road 66) and Washington Streets near the Ohio River in Troy; 37°59′43″N 86°48′19″W	Science, Medicine, and Inventions, Transportation
Hines Raid 1862		1963	Western side of State Road 66 just north of the County Road 104 and the bridge over Poison Creek, 4 miles south of Derby; 37°58′30″N 86°32′0″W	Military
Civil War Memorial Grave 1865		1965	County Road 36 next to the Ohio River and right before the paved road turns to gravel, 0.5 miles south of Magnet; 38°6′53″N 86°28′12″W	Military, Transportation
Indiana Cotton Mill		1966	Junction of 3rd and Washington Streets in Cannelton; 37°54′41″N 86°44′43″W	Business, Industry, and Labor

== See also ==
- List of Indiana state historical markers
- National Register of Historic Places listings in Perry County, Indiana
