= Thomas Alexander Tefft =

American architect (1826–1859)

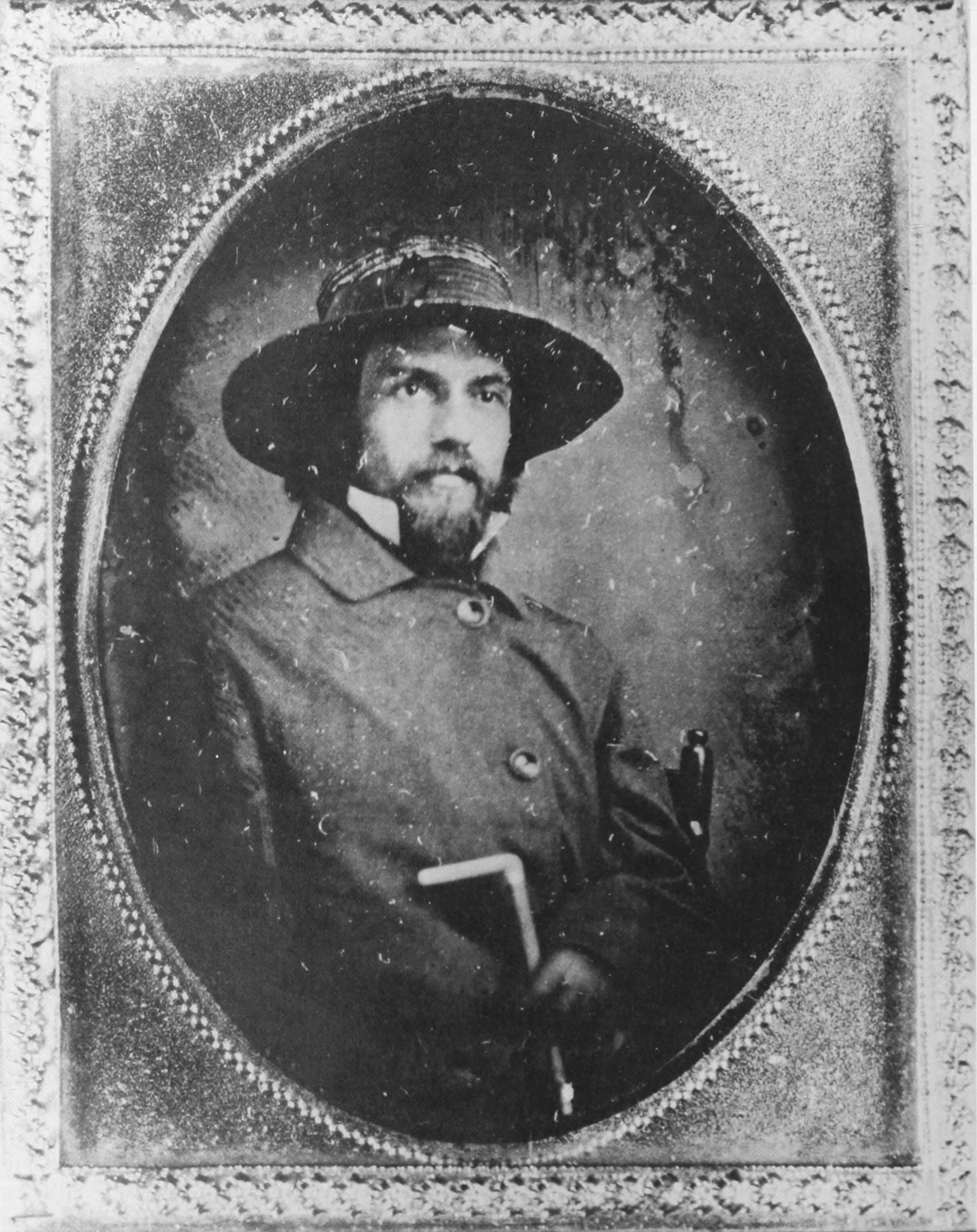
- Born: August 2, 1826; Richmond, Rhode Island
- Died: December 12, 1859 (aged 33); Florence, Italy
- Education: Brown University
- Occupation: Architect
- Buildings: Cannelton Cotton Mill; Narragansett Baptist Church; Providence Union Railroad Depot (1847–1896)

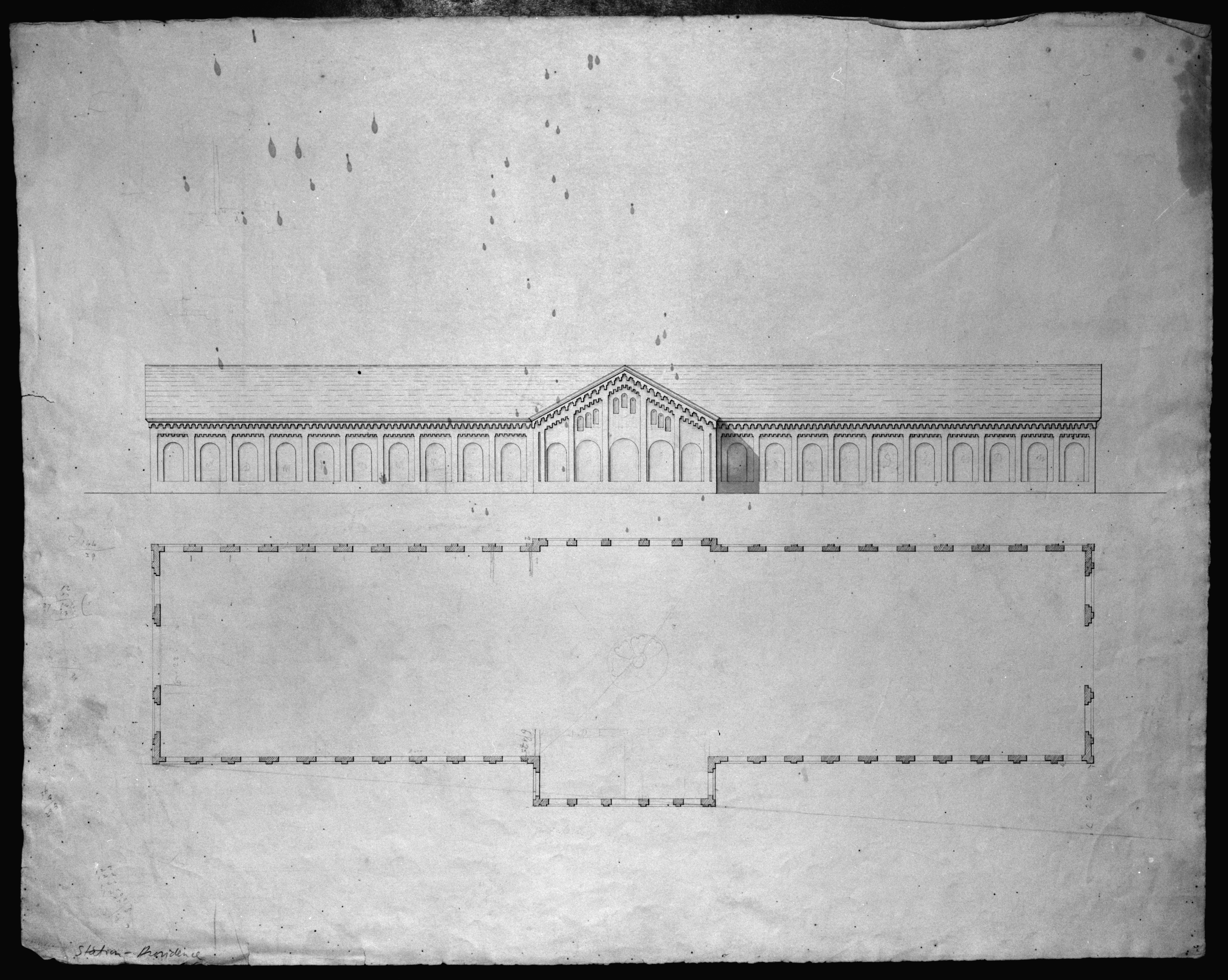
Tefft's design for Freight House No. 1, of the Providence and Worcester Railroad, Providence. 1847, demolished.

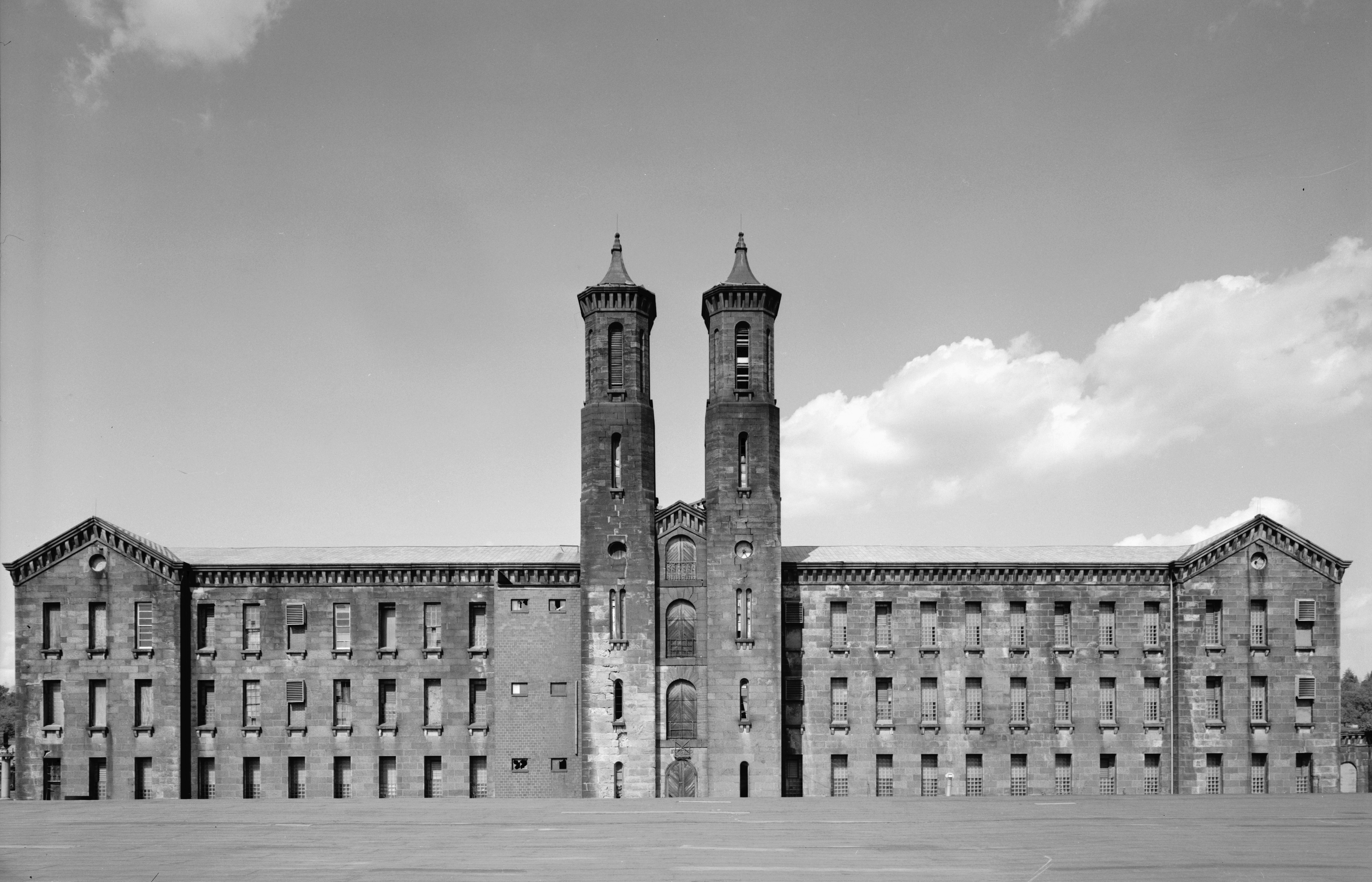
Tefft's Cotton Mill in Cannelton, IN, completed in 1851. The mill is shown here before its restoration.

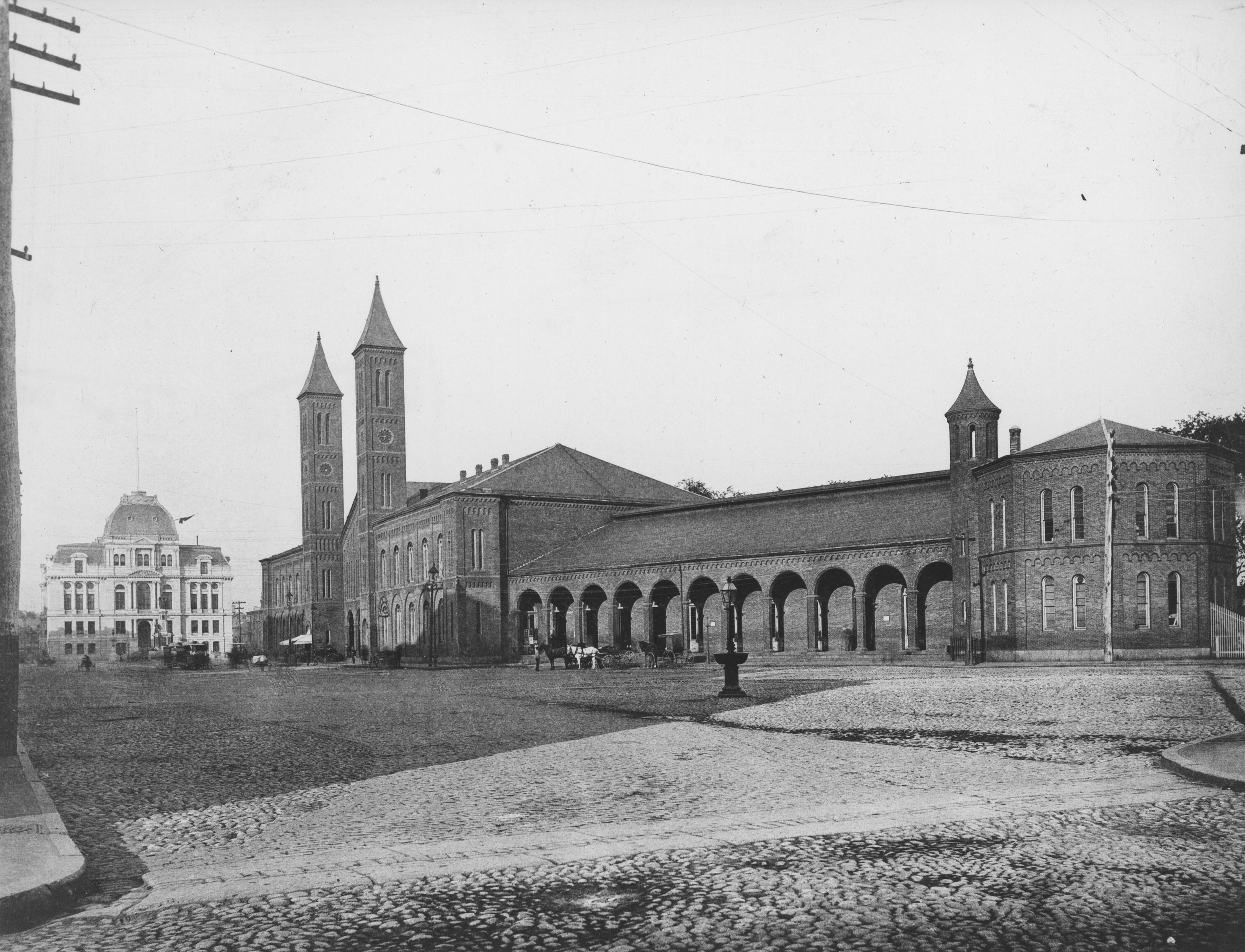
Providence Union Station, 1847–1896. Note the similarity in style to the Cannelton Cotton Mill

Thomas Alexander Tefft (August 2, 1826 – December 12, 1859) was an American architect, from Providence, Rhode Island. Tefft, one of the nation's first professionally trained architects, is considered a master of Rundbogenstil and a leading American proponent of its use. Prior to his untimely death, Tefft "offered the most advanced designs of [his] day in America"

== Life and career ==
=== Early life ===
Tefft was born in rural Richmond, Rhode Island, outside of the small village of Wood River Junction. He was the fourth child of William C. and Sarah Tefft. His family worshiped at the Richmond Six-Principle Baptist Church. During his childhood, Tefft experienced poor health; unable to exert himself physically, he developed an appreciation of books. At the age of 10, he enrolled at a school kept by Elisha Baggs. During his later adolescence, Tefft taught at a local schoolhouse.

During the 1840s, the state school commissioner, Henry Barnard, embarked on an inspection of the state's public schools. Noting Tefft's talents for drawing and the other arts, Barnard convinced him to move to Providence and study architecture. He entered the office of Tallman and Bucklin–then one of the city's primary offices. By 1846, Tefft played a dominant role in the firm's designs. In 1847, he enrolled at Brown University, where he studied under Alexis Caswell.

At this time, Tefft exhibited a strong grasp of Rundbogenstil, amassing a large library of books on the style and advocating for its use.

=== Later career and death ===
In 1851, Tefft graduated from Brown. At the same time, the partnership of Tallman and Bucklin was dissolved. Tefft then opened his own office, and ran a notable practice that lasted only five years. In 1856, he decided to embark on a grand tour of Europe. Due to the beginning of an economic downturn, the only work that Tefft had in his office were the initial designs of Vassar College. With that project stagnating, he chose to go. He departed on the steamer Arago on December 13, 1856.

He began in England, where he studied the works of Christopher Wren, among others. He also met and was entertained in the home of noted architect Charles Barry. During his tour, Tefft visited the cities of Paris, Rome, Geneva, Berlin, Milan, and Florence, among others. In 1857, he was invited to join the new American Institute of Architects, and was among that organization's first fellows. In December 1859, he fell ill with a fever in Florence at the home of his friend, sculptor Hiram Powers. He died there on the 12th. Tefft was first buried in the English Cemetery in Florence; in February 1860, his body was shipped back to Rhode Island, where it was reinterred in Swan Point Cemetery.

== Works ==
=== With Tallman and Bucklin, 1846–1851 ===
- Barrington School, 351 Nayatt Road, Barrington, Rhode Island (1840) – now a private home
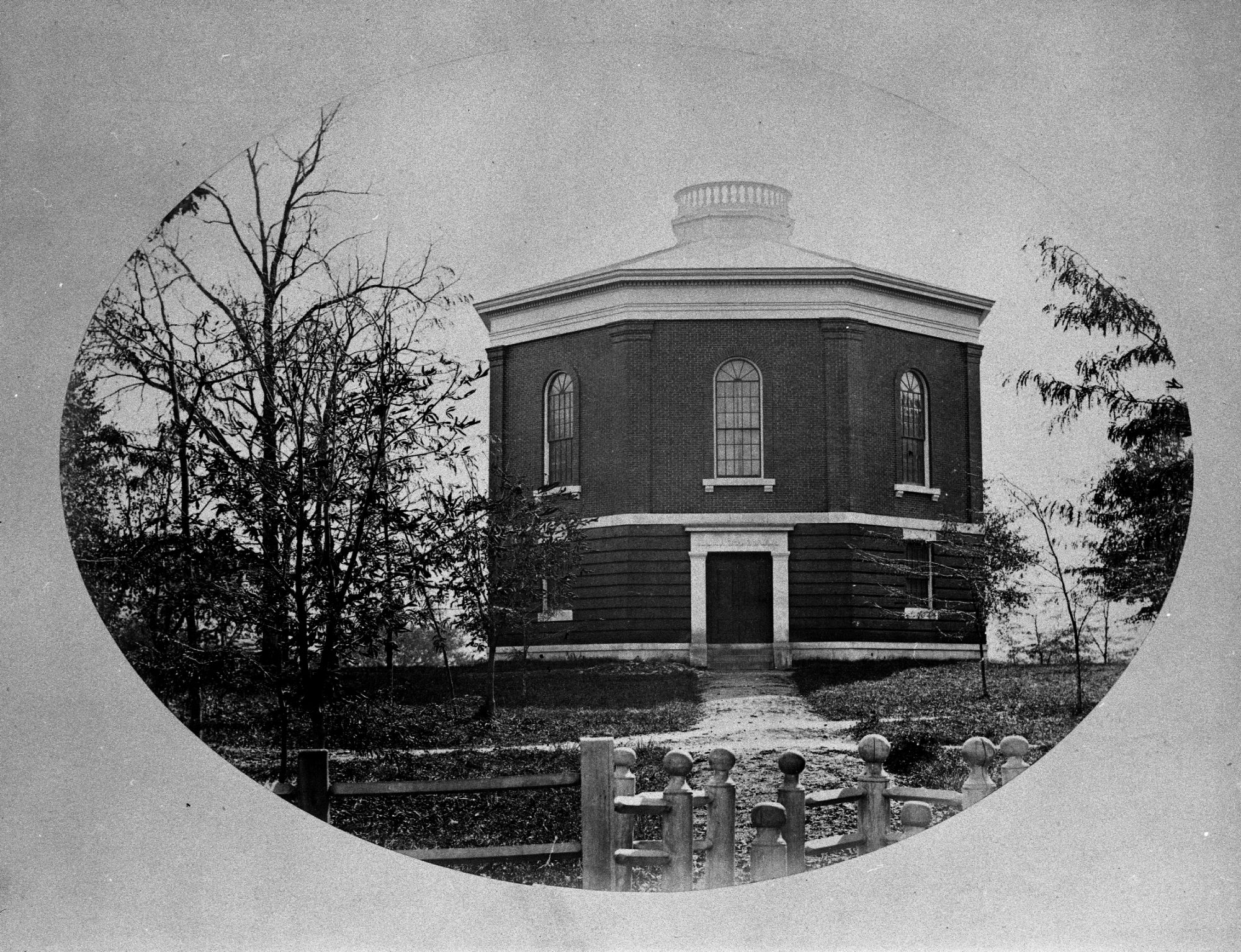
- Lawrence Hall, 1846–47
  Lawrence Hall, Williams College, Williamstown, Massachusetts (1846–47) – built as the library, now part of the Williams College Museum of Art
- Butler Hospital, 345 Blackstone Blvd., Providence, RI (1847) – significantly altered
- Elisha Dyer House, 11 Greene St., Providence, RI (1847) – demolished
- Freight House No. 1, Canal St. at Elizabeth, Providence, RI (1847–48) – served as the passenger station until Union Station was completed, demolished
- Gatehouse, Swan Point Cemetery, 585 Blackstone Blvd., Providence, RI (1847) – demolished
- Receiving Vault, Swan Point Cemetery, 585 Blackstone Blvd., Providence, RI (1847)
- Second Universalist Church, 151 Weybosset St., Providence, RI (1847–49) – burned in 2006
- St. Paul's Episcopal Church, 55 Main St., Wickford, RI (1847)
- Liberty Street School, 10 Liberty St., Warren, Rhode Island (1847)
- Allendale School, 545 Woonasquatucket Ave., Allendale, RI (1848)
- Centerdale School, Thomas St., Centerdale, RI (1848) – demolished
- Howard's Block, 171 Westminster St., Providence, RI (1848) – burned in 1853
- Providence Union Station, Kennedy Plaza, Providence, RI (1848) – burned in 1896
- Remodeling of house for Richard James Arnold, 124 S. Main St., Providence, RI (1848) – This house was once the Sabin Tavern; it was demolished in 1891.
- Union High and Grammar School, 60 High School St., Woonsocket, RI (1848–49) – burned in 1875
- Young Ladies' High School, 235 Benefit St., Providence, RI (1848)
- Indiana Cotton Mills, 310 Washington St., Cannelton, Indiana (1849–50) – now the Cotton Mill Apartments
- Menzies Sweet House, 12 Arnold St., Providence, RI (1850)
- Narragansett Baptist Church, 170 S. Ferry Rd., South Ferry, RI (1850)
- Pastors' Rest Monument, Swan Point Cemetery, 585 Blackstone Blvd., Providence, RI (1850)
- Remodeling of the Rhode Island State House, 150 Benefit St., Providence, RI (1850)

=== In private practice, 1851–1856 ===
- New England Screw Co., 1 Henderson St., Providence, RI (circa 1851) – demolished
- Paris Hill House, 201 Washington St., Providence, RI (1851) – later the home of the Union Club of Providence, demolished in 1915
- St. Thomas Episcopal Church, 1 Smith Ave., Greenville, RI (1851) – tower added in 1891
- American Antiquarian Society, 185 Salisbury St., Worcester, MA (1852) – demolished in 1909
- Gatehouse, Butler Hospital, 345 Blackstone Blvd., Providence, RI (1852) – demolished
- Taunton Bank Building, 9 Taunton Green, Taunton, MA (1852) – altered
- Wakefield Baptist Church, 236 Main St., Wakefield, RI (1852)
- Weeden Block, 41 Westminster St., Providence, RI (circa 1852) – demolished
- Edward Pearce House, 2 Benevolent St., Providence, RI (1853) – demolished by the Hope Club for a parking lot in 1960
- Emily Harper House, 80 Ocean Ave., Newport, RI (1853) – greatly expanded in the 1870s, demolished in 1966
- Howard Block, 171 Westminster St., Providence, RI (1853) – burned in 1858
- John B. Palmer House, 151 Waterman St., Providence, RI (1853) – demolished in 1961
- Joseph B. Tompkins House, 38 Catherine St., Newport, RI (1853)
- Oakwoods, Oakwoods Dr., Peace Dale, RI (1853) – the home of Rowland Hazard, demolished
- Quatrel, 669 Bellevue Ave., Newport, RI (1853–54) – for Earl P. Mason
- South Baptist Church, 125 Main St., Hartford, Connecticut (1853–54) – demolished in 1926

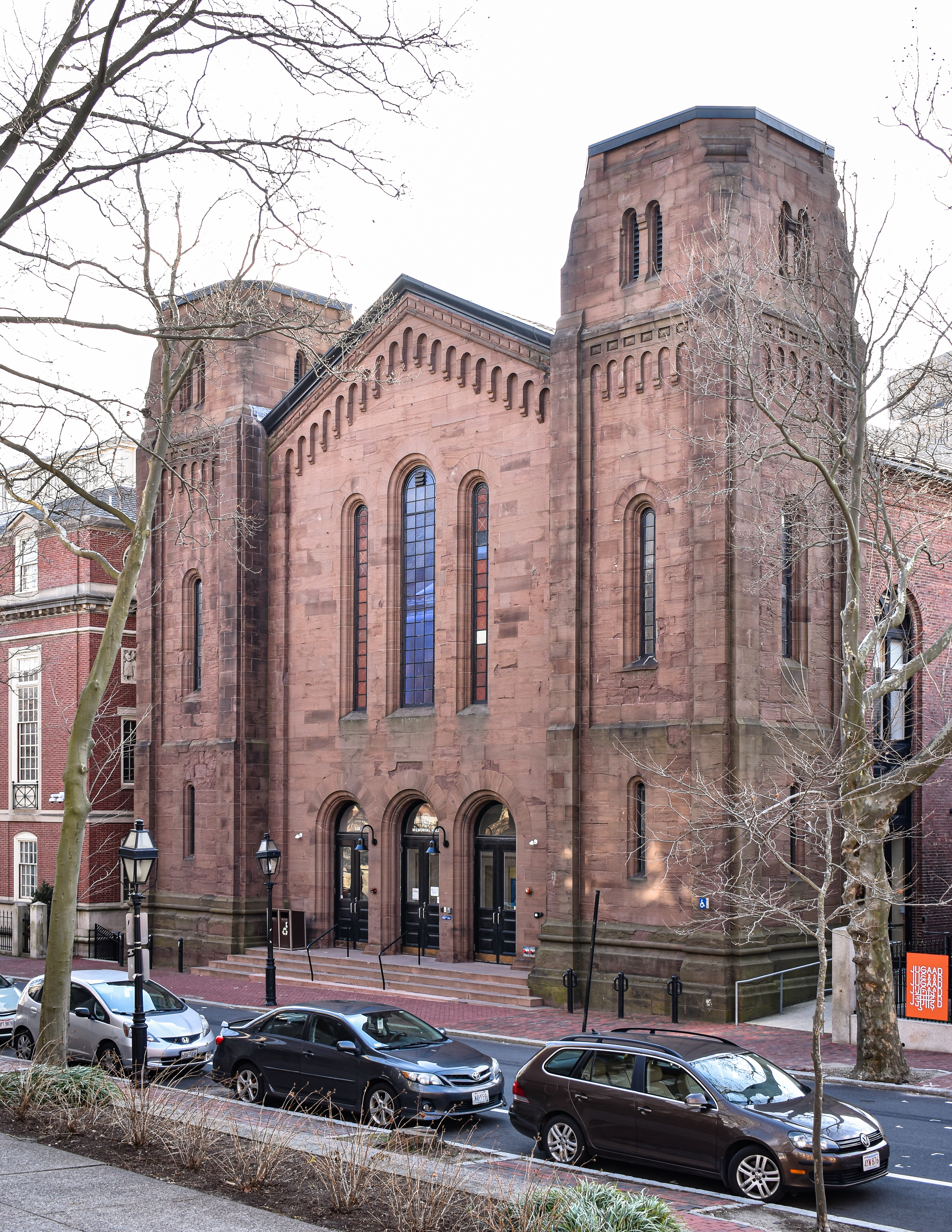
Central Congregational Church, 1853-56

- Central Congregational Church, 226 Benefit Street, Providence, RI (1853–56) – purchased and remodeled by Rhode Island School of Design
- Tully D. Bowen House, 389 Benefit St., Providence, RI (1853)
- First Baptist Church, 212 S. Washington St., Alexandria, Virginia (1854) – significantly altered
- Henry E. Russell House, Lake St. and Grove Hill, New Britain, CT (1854) – demolished
- Richmond College, Grace St., Richmond, VA (1854–55) – only one wing was ever built to Tefft's design, the rest deviated from his plan, demolished
- Richmond Female Institute, N. 10th and E. Marshall Sts., Richmond, VA (1854) – demolished in 1924
- Robert Lippitt House, 193 Hope St., Providence, RI (1854)
- William Slater House, Halliwell Blvd., Slatersville, RI (1854) – demolished
- Charles Potter House, 154 Waterman St., Providence, RI (1855) – remodeled circa 1900
- Charles S. Bradley House, 249 Eaton St., Providence, RI (1855) – now Providence College's Martin Hall.
- Elmhurst, 700 Smith St., Providence, RI (1855) – a house for William Grosvenor that lent the neighborhood its name, burned in 1967
- John Carter Brown II Stable, 357 Benevolent St., Providence, RI (1855)
- Proposal for Providence City Hall, 25 Dorrance St., Providence, RI (1855) – not built
- Roger Williams Free Baptist Church, 1076 Westminster St., Providence, RI (1855) – demolished
- Bank of North America Building, 48 Weybosset St., Providence, RI (1856) – ground floor altered
- Central Baptist Church, Weybosset St. at Empire, Providence, RI (1856) – demolished in 1915 for the new Empire Street
- Proposal for Providence Merchants Exchange Building, 76 Westminster St., Providence, RI (1856) – an unusual circular building, not built
- Proposal for Vassar College, Poughkeepsie, New York – not built due to economic troubles, the commission later went to Renwick, Auchmuty and Sands of New York City
- Seth Padelford Stable, 17 Benevolent St., Providence, RI (1856) – demolished in 1955

== Gallery ==
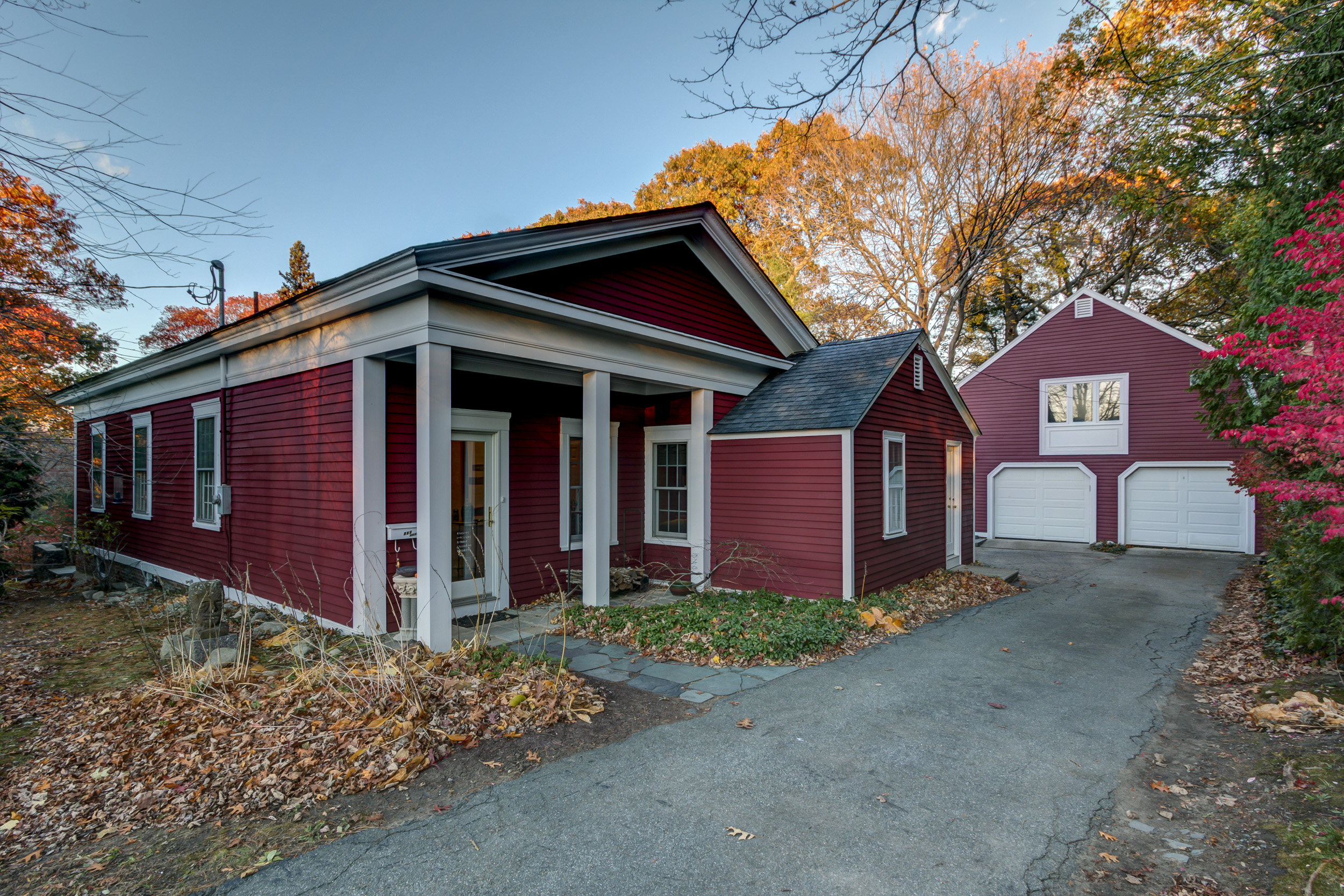
School House (1840), Barrington RI

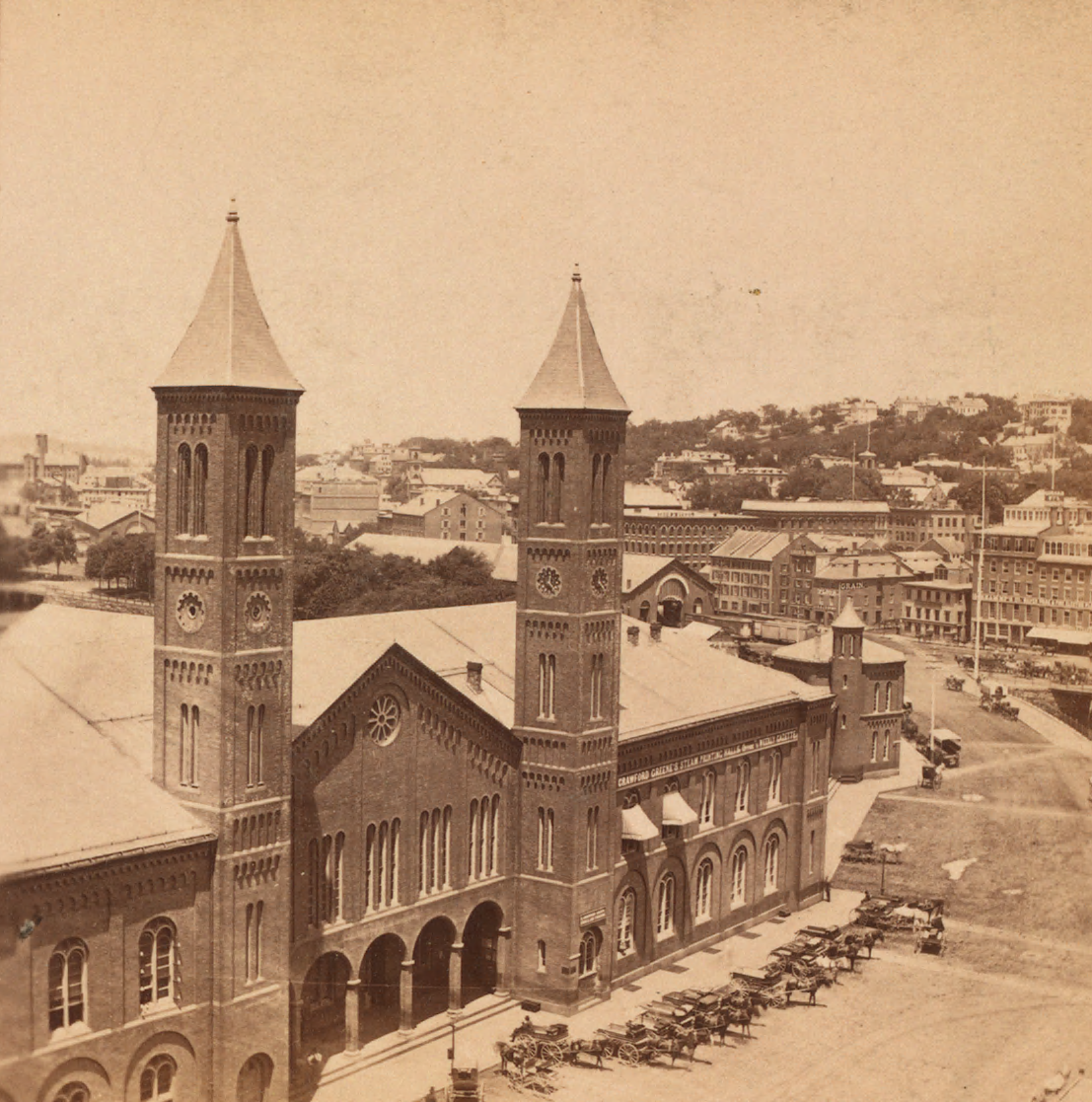
Providence Union Station (1847)

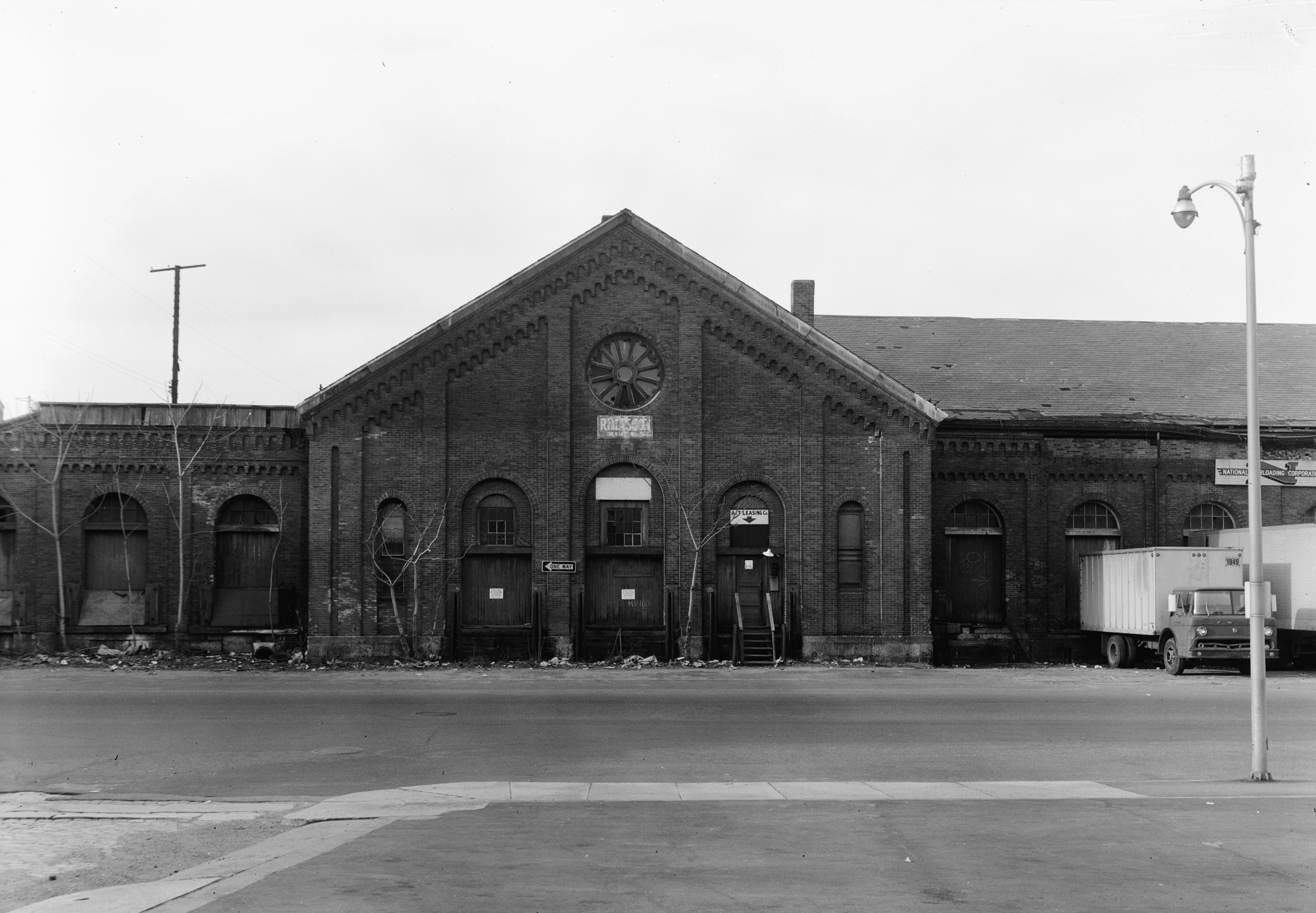
Freight House (1848), Providence

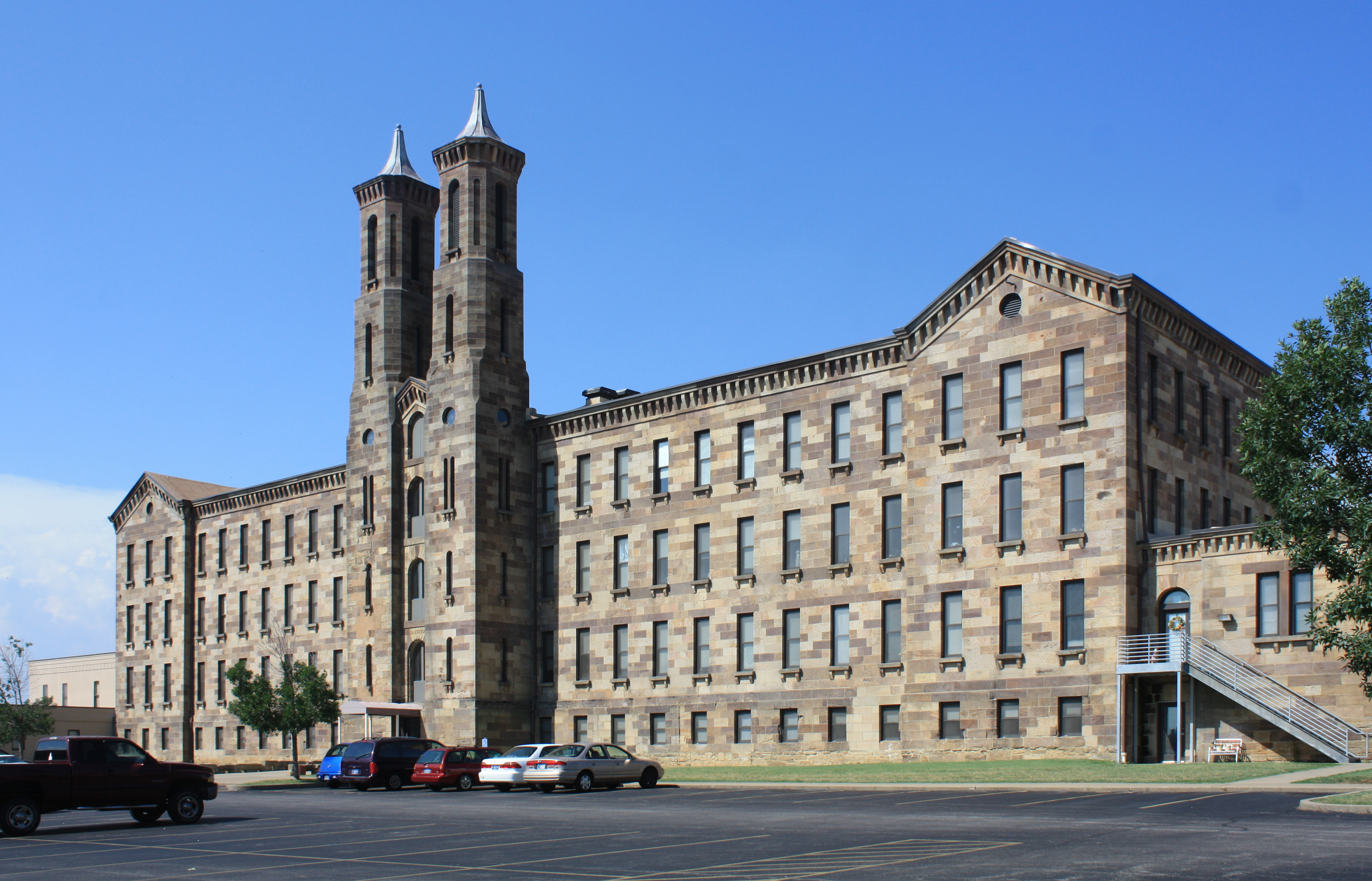
Cannelton Cotton Mill (1851), Cannelton, I.N.

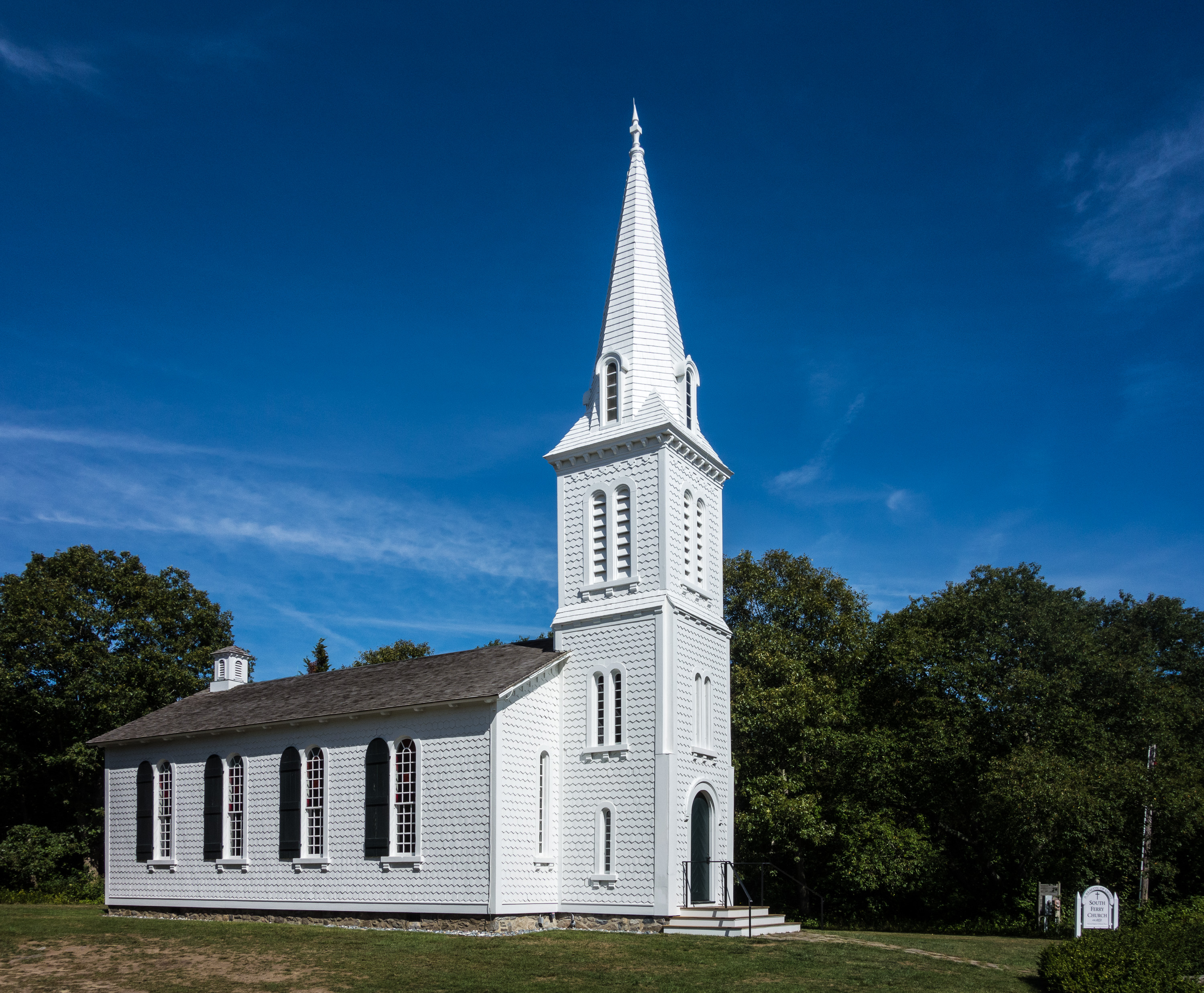
Narragansett Baptist Church (1850), Narraganset, R.I.

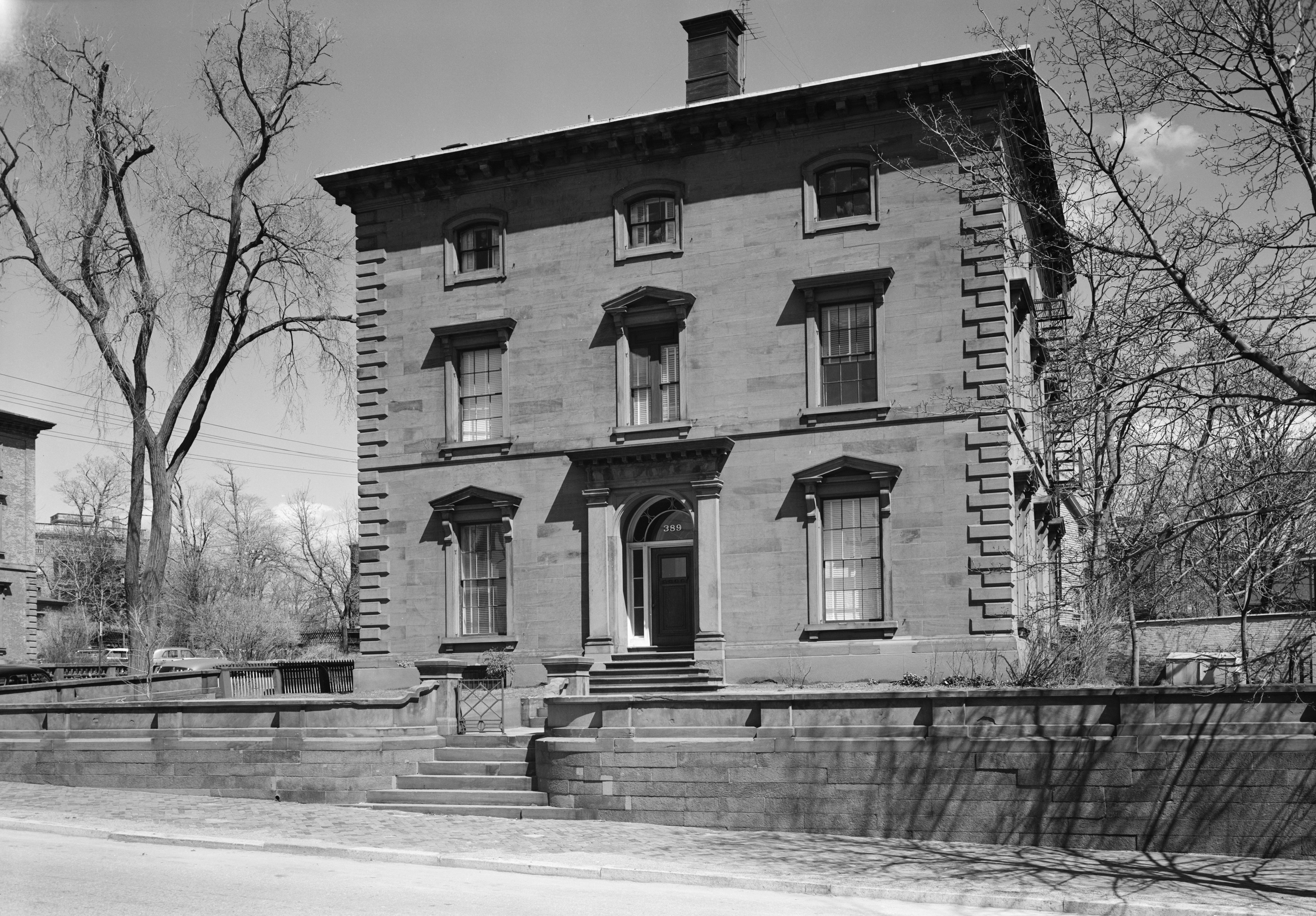
Tully Bowen House (1853), Providence

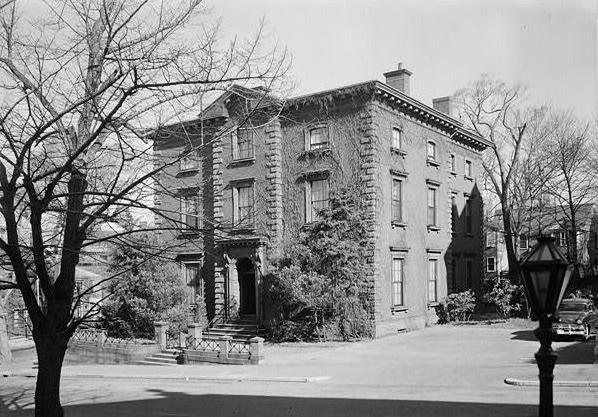
Edward Pearce House (1853), Providence

Richmond Female Institute (1854), Richmond, V.A.

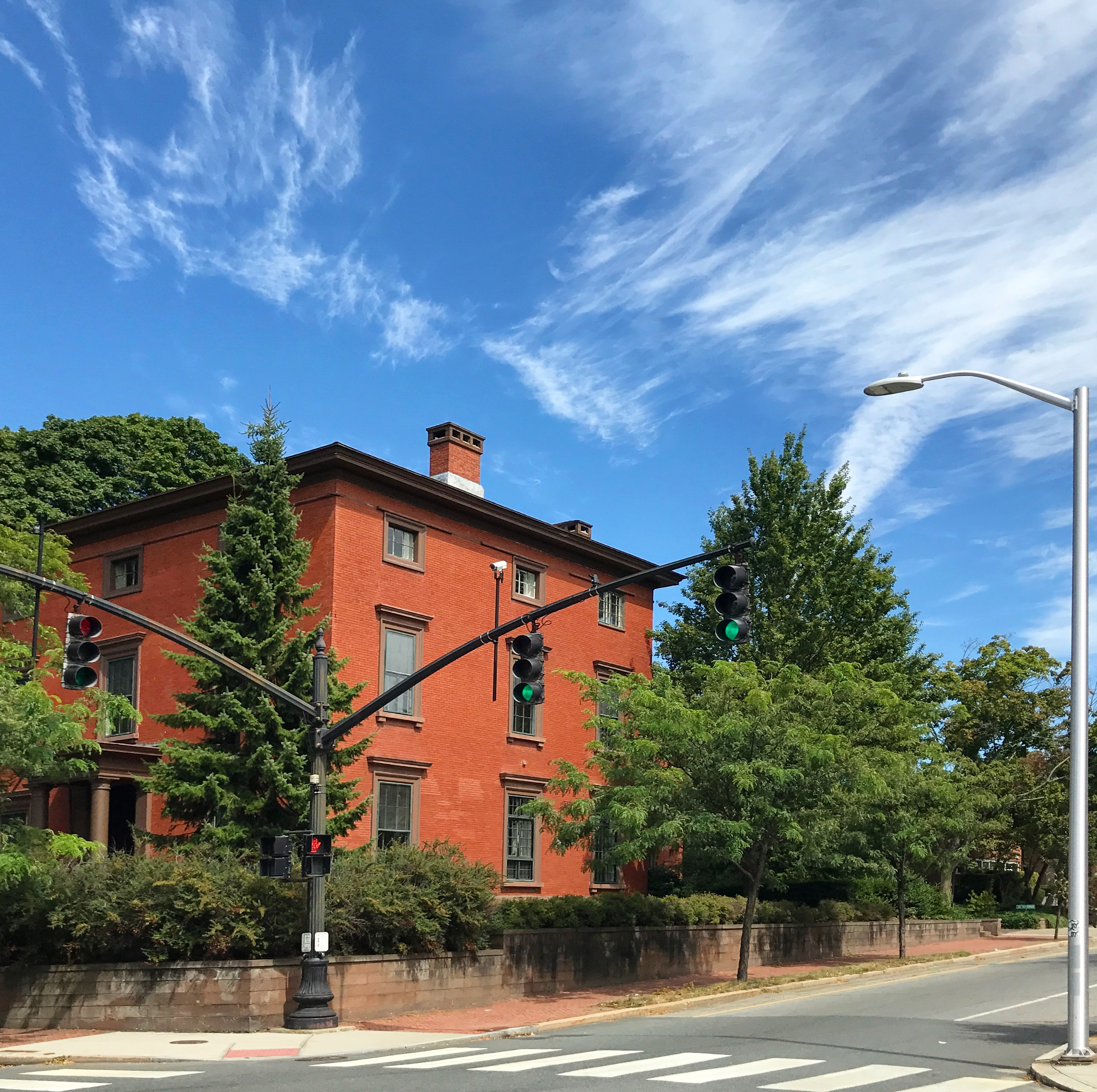
Robert Lippitt House (1854), Providence

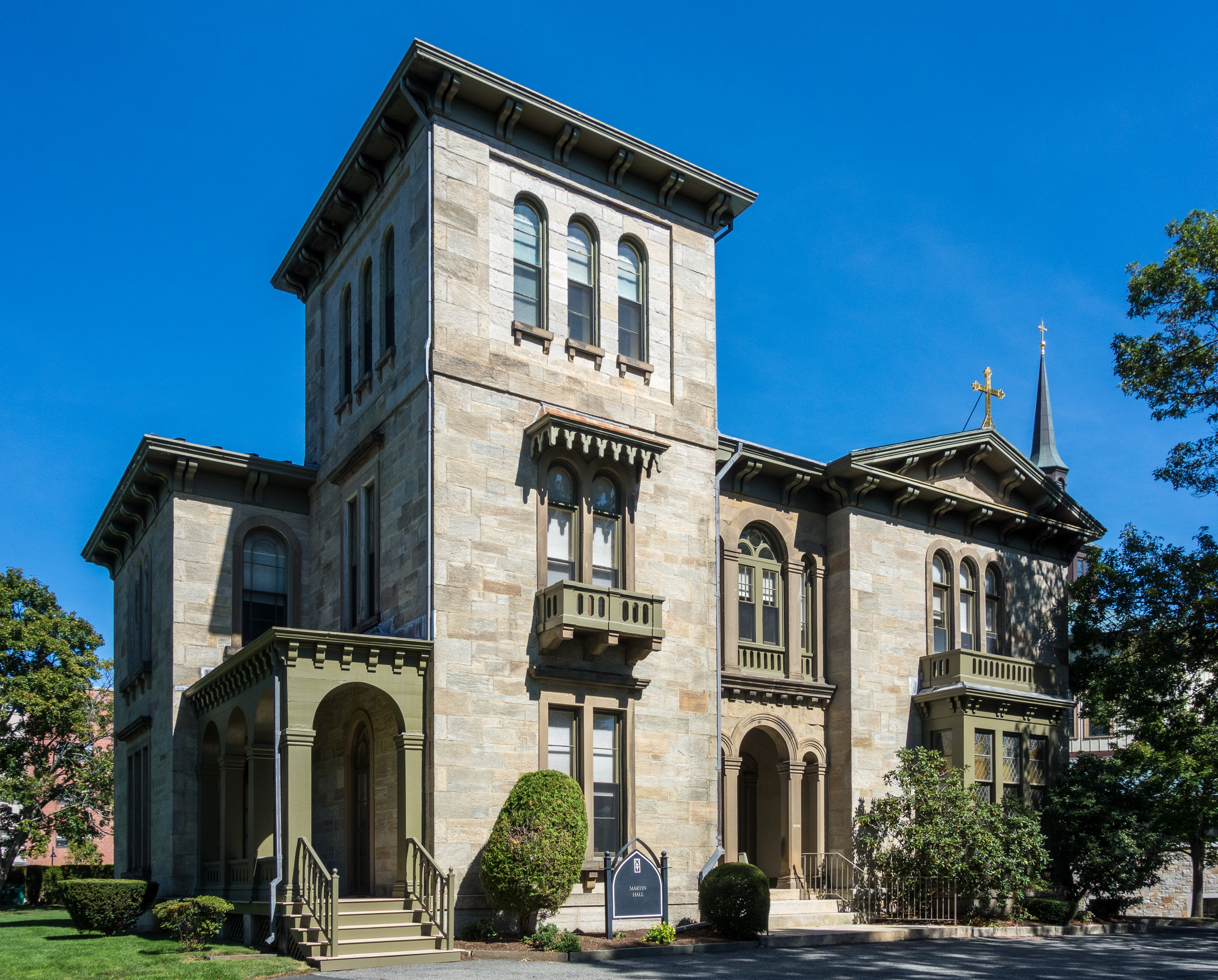
Martin Hall, Providence College (1855), Providence

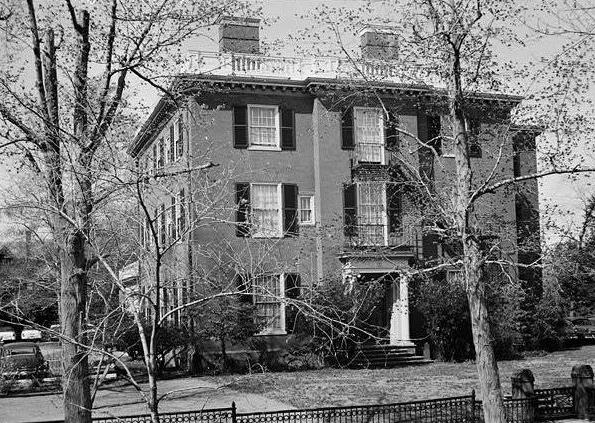
Charles Potter House (1855), Providence

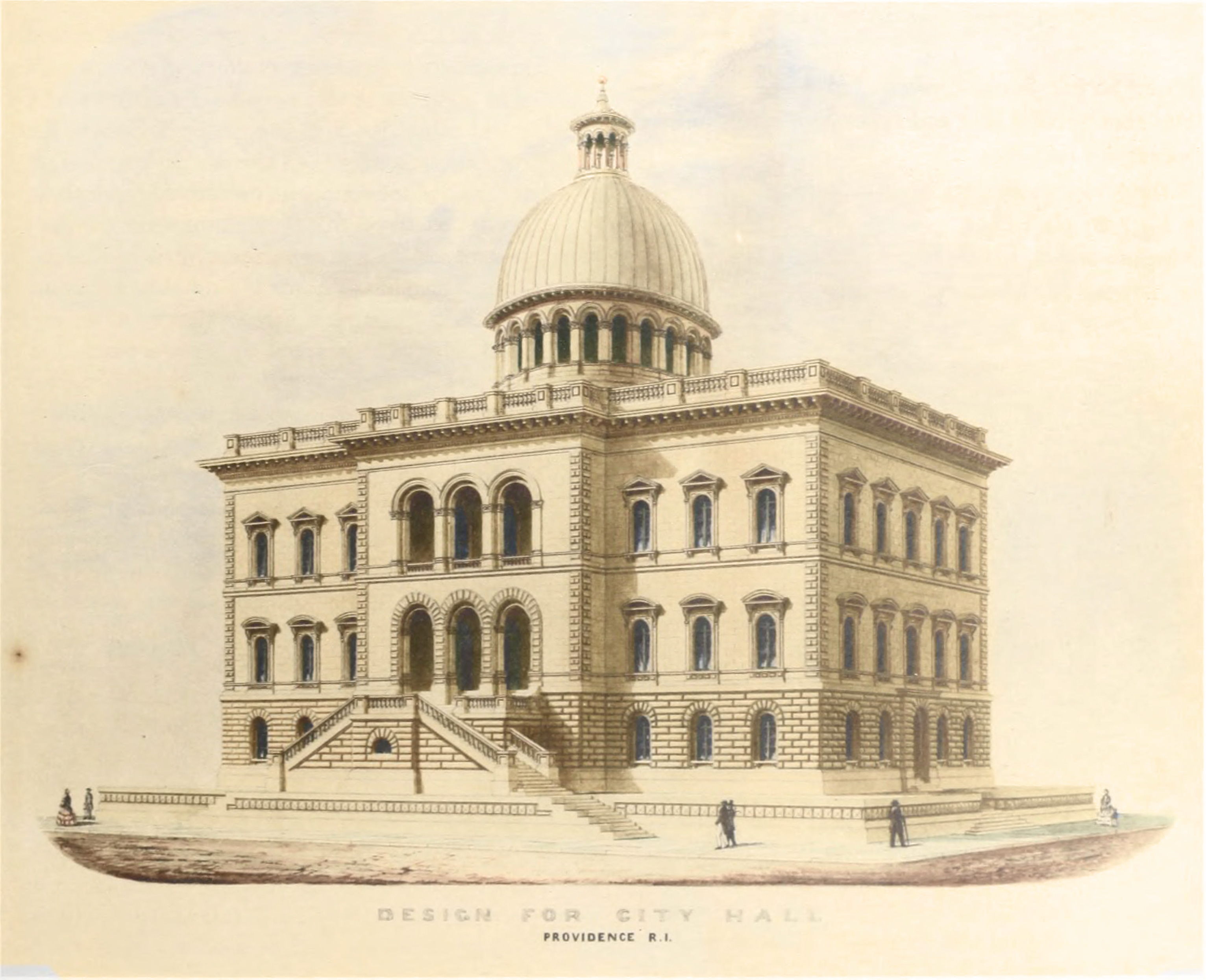
Proposal for Providence City Hall (1855)

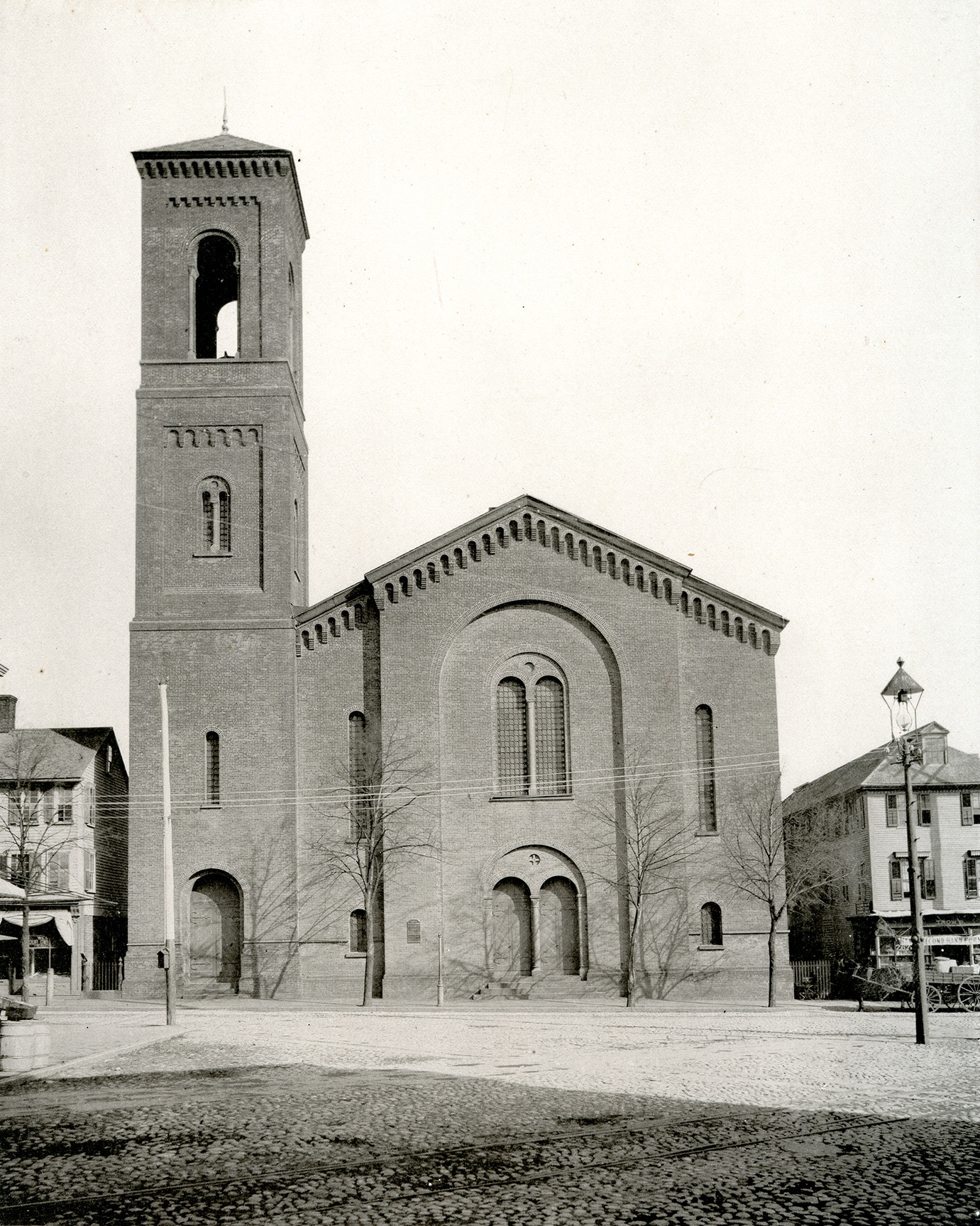
Central Baptist Church (1856), Providence

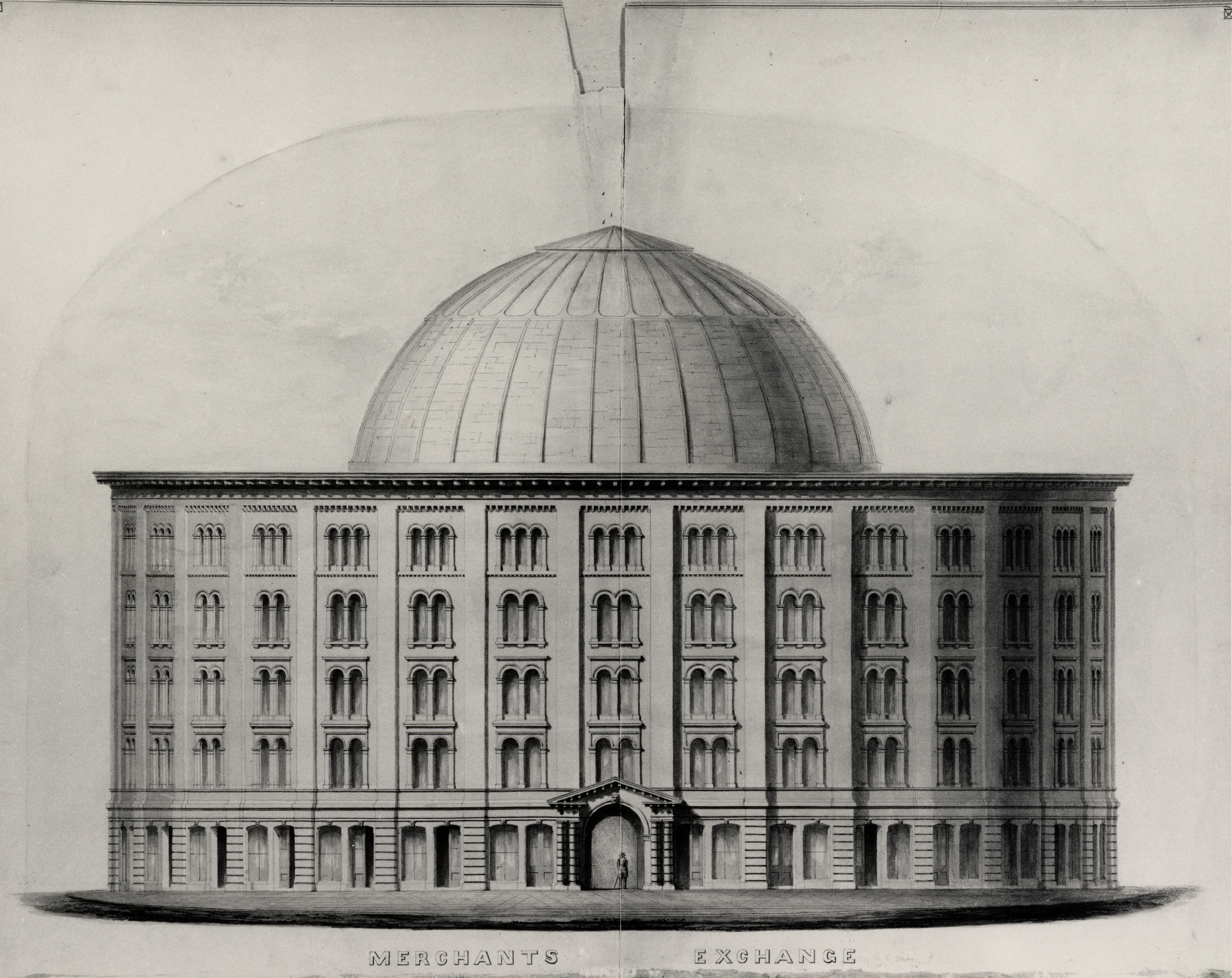
Proposal for Providence Merchants Exchange Building (1856)
