= Joseph Bruggenschmidt =

Joseph Gervase Bruggenschmidt (September 12, 1929 - April 12, 2012) was a politician and forester from the state of Indiana.

== Early life ==
Bruggenschmidt was born near Tell City, Indiana and graduated from Tell City High School in 1948. He served in the United States Marine Corps during the Korean War and received a Purple Heart for injuries received in combat.

Upon his return home, he graduated from Purdue University and began farming with his father, Herman, and younger brother, John.

== Political career ==
In 1962, Bruggenschmidt was nominated for state representative serving Perry and Spencer counties on the Democratic ticket and was elected in November, defeating the incumbent, Republican William Birchler. Bruggenschmidt would hold the seat (to which Dubois, Pike and Warrick counties were later added) for four consecutive terms, until the 1970 election, when he ran for the state Senate. During his time in the House, Bruggenschmidt married Jacqueline Schneider in November 1968 and moved from rural Perry County to Jasper, where he would live the rest of his life.

In 1970, Bruggenschmidt ran for and won the District 47 Senate seat. He was re-elected in 1974 but lost his bid for a third Senate term in the May 1978 primary.

== Retirement and death ==
Following his time in Indianapolis, Bruggenschmidt retired to Jasper, serving on several state boards and commissions and working as a consultant forester and farmer until his death from lung cancer in Jasper on April 12, 2012.
