= Cannelton Historic District =

Historic district in Indiana, United States

- U.S. National Register of Historic Places
- U.S. Historic district
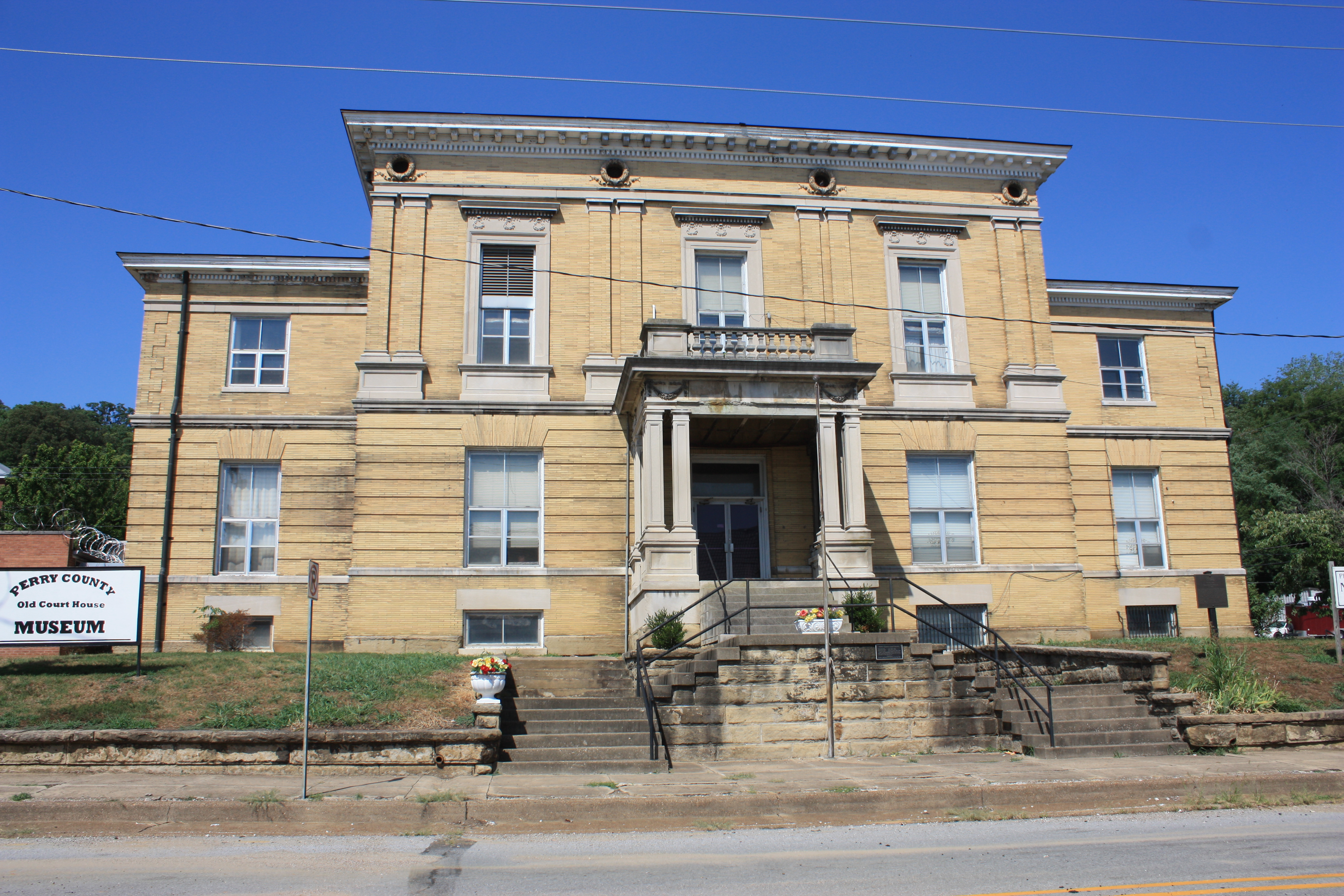
- Former Perry County Courthouse, now a museum

- Location within Indiana Location within the United States
- Location: Roughly bounded by Richardson, Taylor, First, and Madison Sts., Cannelton, Indiana
- Coordinates: 37°54′44″N 86°44′35″W
- Area: 61 acres (25 ha)
- Built: 1843
- Architect: Hutchings, John Bacon
- Architectural style: Bungalow/craftsman, Late Victorian, Gothic Revival
- NRHP reference No.: 87000108
- Added to NRHP: February 12, 1987

Cannelton Historic District is a national historic district located at Cannelton, Indiana. The district encompasses 178 contributing buildings, 42 contributing structures, and two contributing objects in the central business district and surrounding residential and industrial areas of Cannelton. The area developed between 1837 and 1936, and includes notable examples of Gothic Revival, Late Victorian, and Bungalow / American Craftsman style architecture. A number of the buildings are constructed of native sandstone. Notable buildings include the National Historic Landmark Indiana Cotton Mill (1849–1850), St. Michael's Church (1859), F. H. Clemens Store, Cannelton Sewer Pipe Company, Josie Nicolay House, Myers Grade School / The Free School (1868), Jacob Heck Building (1882), Perry County Courthouse (1896–1897), and the separately listed St. Luke's Episcopal Church.

It was listed on the National Register of Historic Places in 1987.
