= St. Luke's Episcopal Church (Cannelton, Indiana) =

Historic church in Indiana, United States

- U.S. National Register of Historic Places
- U.S. Historic district – Contributing property
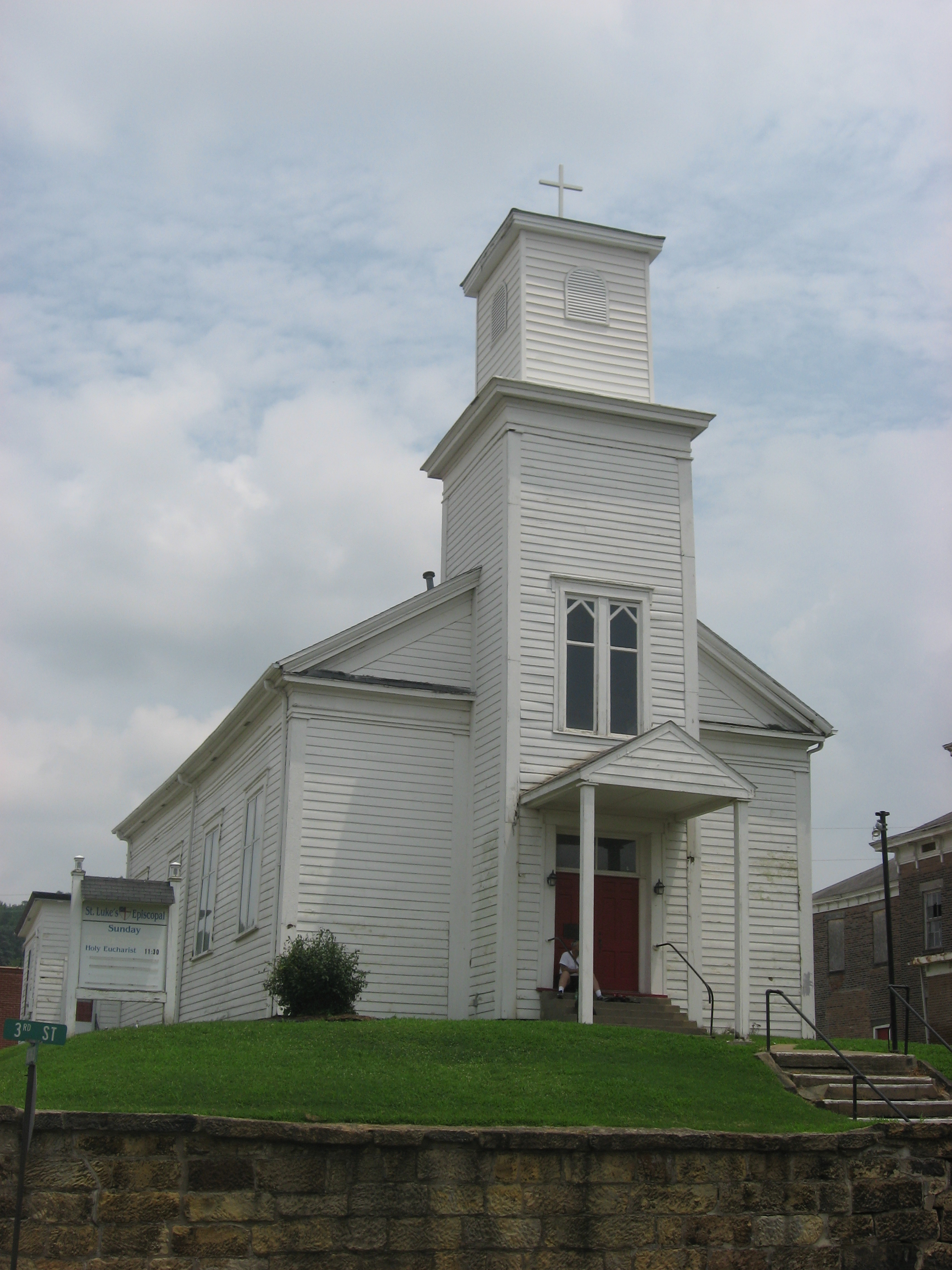
- St. Luke's Episcopal Church, July 2011

- Location within Indiana Location within the United States
- Location: Third and Washington Sts., Cannelton, Indiana
- Coordinates: 37°54′39″N 86°44′40″W
- Area: less than one acre
- Built: c. 1845–1846
- Architectural style: Greek Revival
- NRHP reference No.: 83000144
- Added to NRHP: March 3, 1983

St. Luke's Episcopal Church is a historic Episcopal church at Cannelton, Indiana. Built about 1845–1846, it is a rectangular Greek Revival style frame building with a gable roof. It was lengthened by 17 feet in 1864, and features a three-story centered bell tower on the front facade.

The church reported 19 members in 2023; no membership statistics were reported in 2024 parochial reports. Plate and pledge income reported for the congregation in 2024 was $4,368. Average Sunday attendance (ASA) in 2024 was 0 persons.

It was listed on the National Register of Historic Places in 1983. It is located in the Cannelton Historic District.
