= Cannelton Locks and Dam =

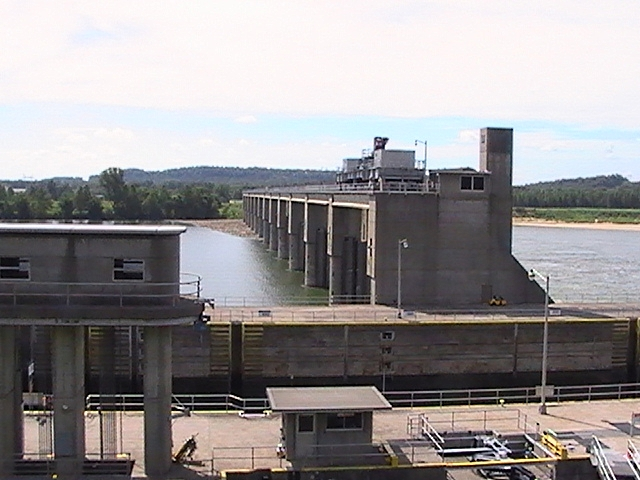
- Interactive map of Cannelton Locks and Dam
- Location: Perry County, Indiana / Hancock County, Kentucky US
- Coordinates: 37°53′59″N 86°42′21″W
- Status: Operational
- Construction began: July 1963
- Opening date: December 1966
- Construction cost: $98 million ($763 million with inflation)
- Owner: United States Government
- Operator: US Army Corps of Engineers

Dam and spillways
- Type of dam: Concrete fixed weir with tainter gate
- Impounds: Ohio River
- Height: 42 feet (13 m)
- Length: 1,827 feet (557 m)
- Spillway type: 12 tainter gate
- Website; US Army Corps of Engineers: Cannelton Locks and Dam

The Cannelton Locks and Dam is a tainter-gated dam with two locks on the Ohio River, on the border between the U.S. states of Indiana and Kentucky. The dam is 2 miles (3.2 km) southeast of Cannelton, Indiana. Construction of the locks began in July 1963. The locks began operation in December 1966 and were completed April 1967. Construction on the dam started in August 1965 and the dam was completed in 1974. The structure was designed, built, and is operated by the United States Army Corps of Engineers Louisville District.

== Dam ==
The Cannelton Dam is located at river mile 720.7 (measured from Pittsburgh, Pennsylvania) and has two sections. The main section is 1,412 feet (430 m) long with twelve tainter gate. The gates are held between 15-foot-wide (4.6 m) piers. Each gate is 42 feet (13 m) high and 100 feet (30 m) long. Electric hoists on top of the piers are used to raise or lower the gates. At the end of the gated section of the dam there is second section, a concrete fixed weir on the Kentucky side of the river. The weir is 195 feet (59 m) long.

== Locks ==
The Cannelton Locks run parallel to each other on the Indiana side of the river. There are two locks alongside the dam, the main lock which measures 110 feet (34 m) by 1,200 feet (370 m) and the auxiliary lock that is 110 feet (34 m) by 600 feet (180 m). The locks can be filled or emptied in around 8 minutes.

The upper pool is normally at an elevation of 383.0 feet (116.7 m), mean sea level and the lower pool elevation is 358.0 feet (109.1 m), mean sea level. The lift (difference) between the two pool is 25 feet (7.6 m). 25 million US gallons (95,000 m^{3}) of water is required to operate the lock.

The locks reduce travel time because it enables large commercial tows to go through only one lockage rather than the three locks it replaced. Also the large lock chamber allows a large vessels to pass through the lock in a single operation instead of using smaller lock sections.

== Authorization and construction ==
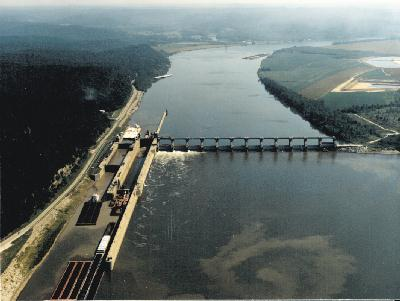
Cannelton Locks and Dam on the Ohio River near Cannelton, Indiana.

On January 27, 1960, the project was approved by Secretary of the Army, Wilber Marion Brucker. Under the authority of Section 6 of the Rivers and Harbors Act, approved March 3, 1909, the existing Locks 43, 44 and 45 were replaced. The construction of the locks began in July 1963. The locks began operation in December 1966 and were completed April 1967. Construction on the dam started in August 1965 and the dam was completed in 1974. The structure was designed, built, and is operated by the United States Army Corps of Engineers Louisville District.

There were 128 acres (0.52 km^{2}) of overlook property that was initially built during the construction project. In 1995, the property was excessed to the United States Fish and Wildlife Service for use as a wildlife habitat.

== Hydroelectric power ==
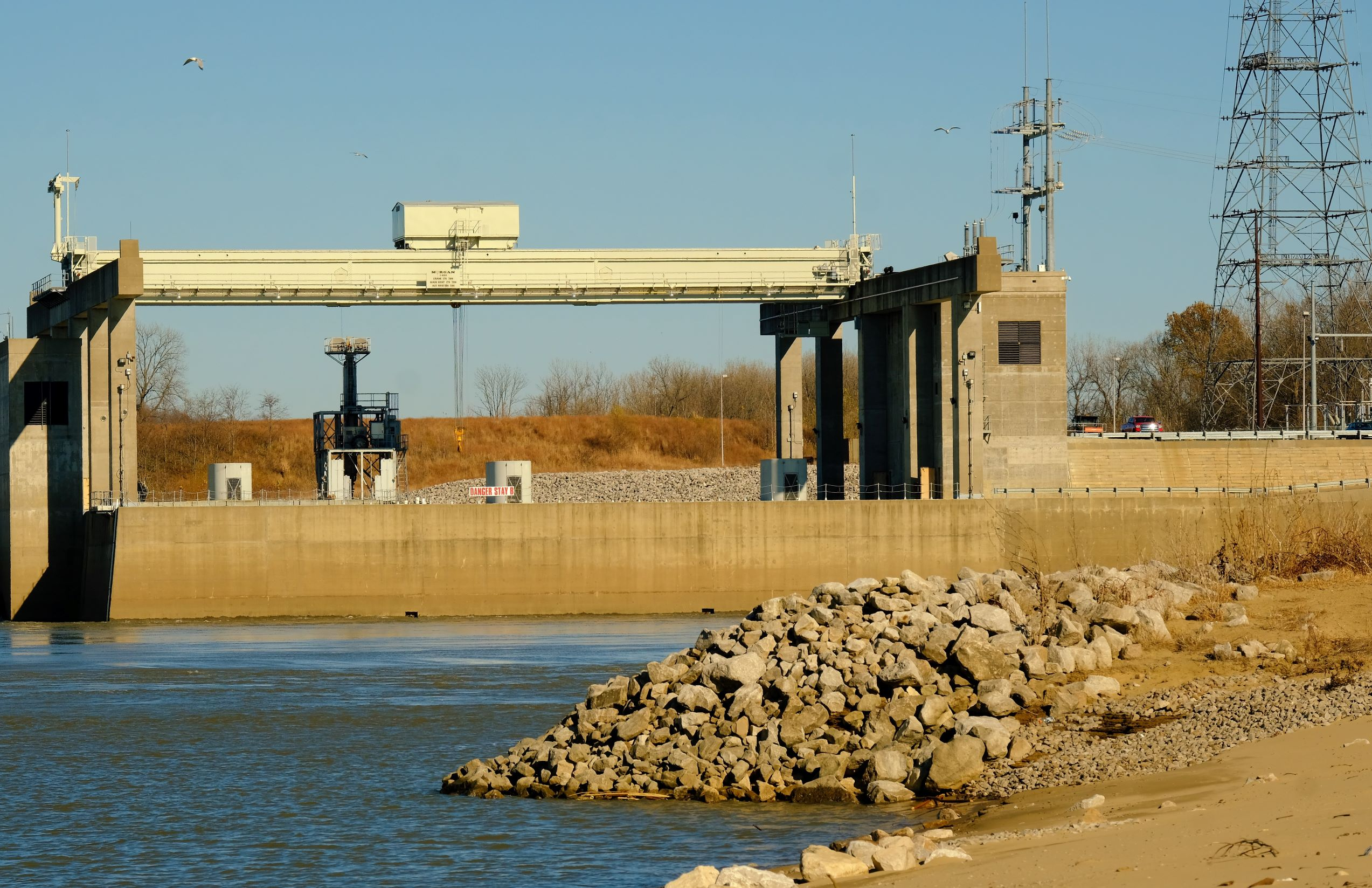
Cannelton Hydroelectric Power Plant

American Municipal Power (AMP) is currently outfitting the dam to divert water to three bulb turbines to generate an average gross annual output of approximately 458 million kilowatt-hours (kWh). The project includes the construction of an intake approach channel, a concrete powerhouse, and a tailrace channel. The powerhouse will contain three horizontal 28 MW bulb-type turbine and generating unit with total rated capacity of 84 MW at a gross head of 25 feet (7.6 m). Construction began in 2009. Excavation and cofferdam construction was completed in 2010. Powerhouse construction began in 2011. All concrete work on the powerhouse has been completed and work has begun on the interior. The project that will cost an estimated $416 million. The plant reached full commercial operation in June 2016.

== See also ==
- List of locks and dams of the Ohio River
