= Cannelton Cotton Mill =

- Cannelton Cotton Mills
- U.S. National Register of Historic Places
- U.S. National Historic Landmark
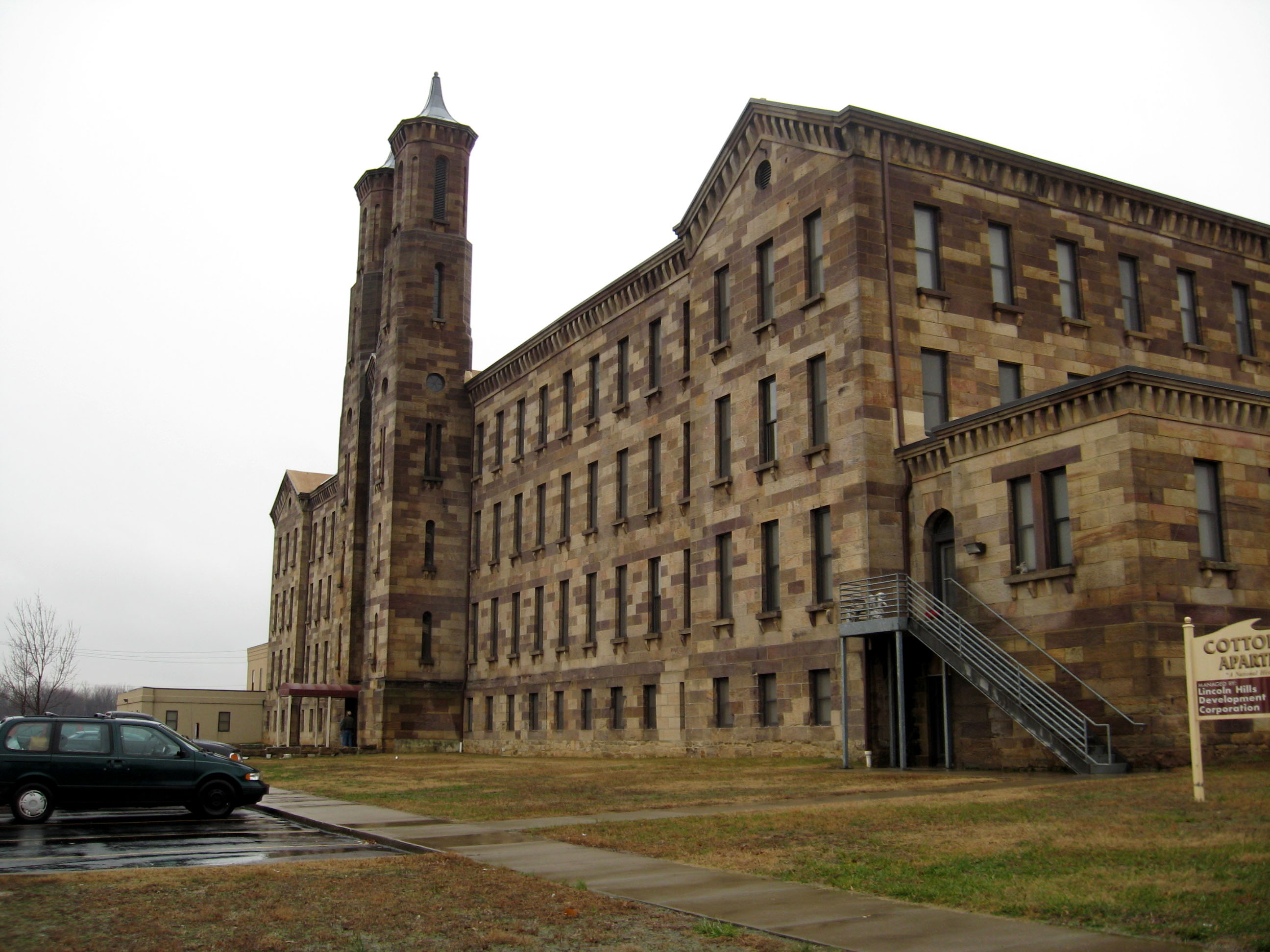
- Mill in 2007, after adaptive restoration
- Location: Cannelton, IN, United States
- Coordinates: 37°54′40.72″N 86°44′44.29″W
- Area: less than one acre
- Built: 1849
- Architect: Thomas A. Tefft, Alexander McGregor
- Architectural style: Romanesque
- NRHP reference No.: 75000011

Significant dates
- Added to NRHP: August 22, 1975
- Designated NHL: July 17, 1991

Cannelton Cotton Mill, also known as Indiana Cotton Mill, is a National Historic Landmark of the United States located in Cannelton, Indiana, United States. Built in 1849 as an effort to expand textile milling out of New England, it was the largest industrial building west of the Allegheny Mountains, designed by Thomas Alexander Tefft, an early industrial architect. It was declared a National Historic Landmark in 1991. The building now houses residences.

== History ==
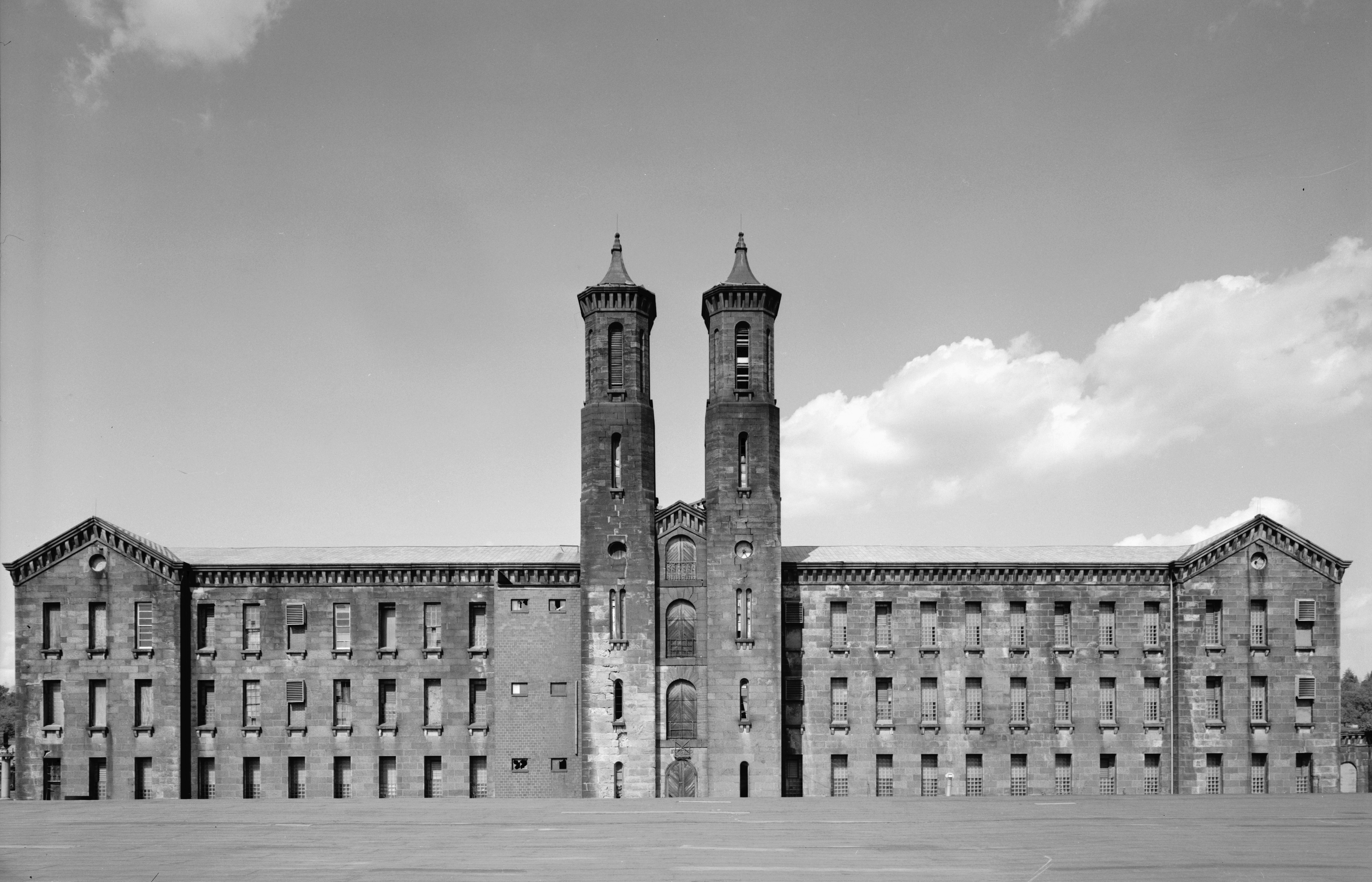
Cannelton Cotton Mill in 1974

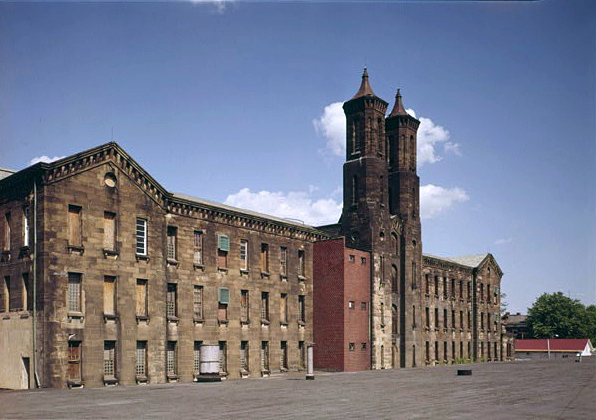
Mill in 1981, before adaptive restoration

Construction of the Cannelton Cotton Mill began in 1849 and was completed in 1851. Designed by Rhode Island architect Thomas Alexander Tefft and built of sandstone, the mill was once the largest industrial building in the United States west of the Allegheny Mountains. It initially employed about 400 workers, mostly women and girls, and annually produced more than 200,000 pounds of cotton batting and four million yards of cotton sheeting. Of 309 workers employed there in 1890, only 78 were men. As late as 1900, the mill employed 35 girls and 19 boys under the age of 18.

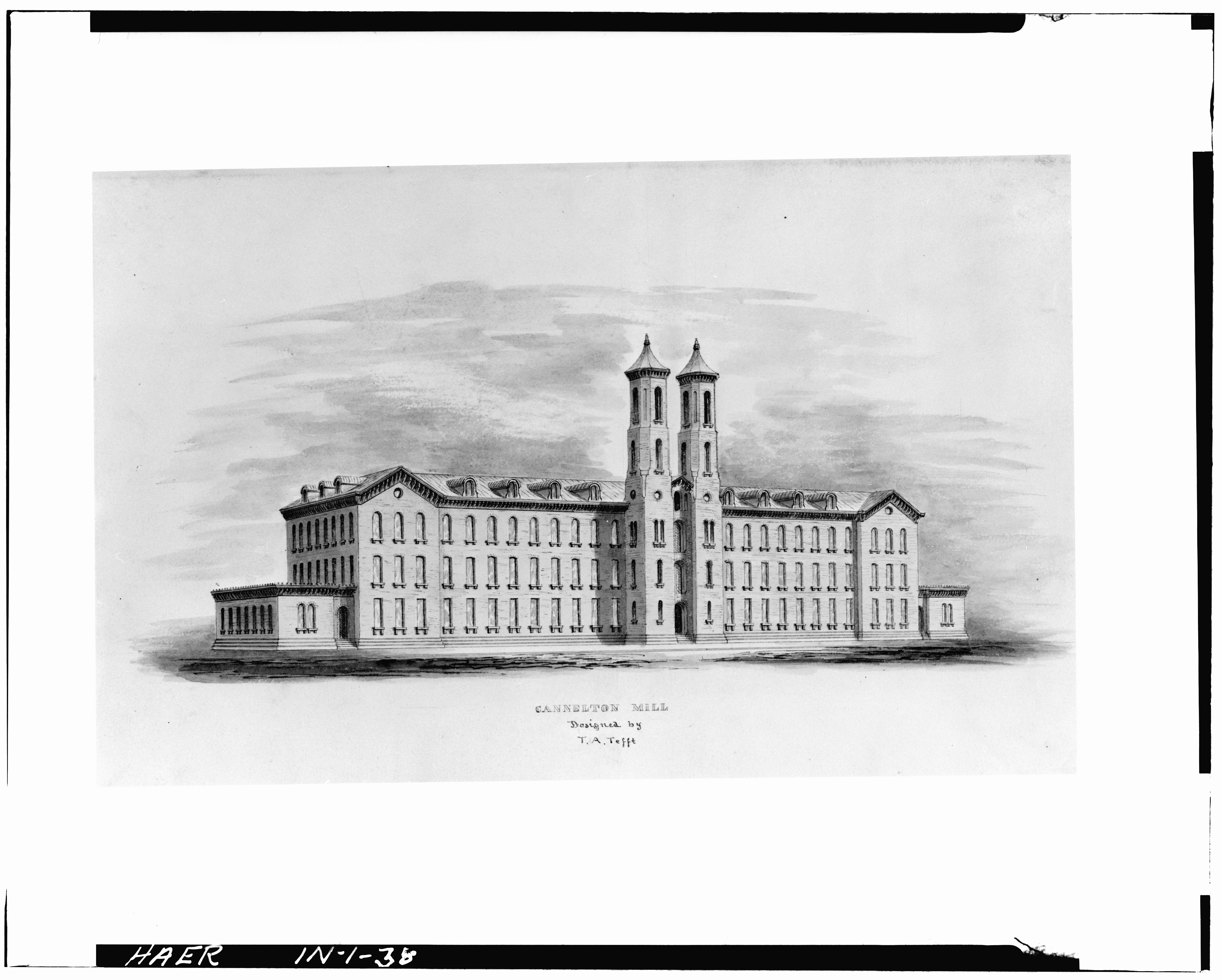
Architectural drawing of the Cannelton Cotton Mill.

The driving force behind the mill's construction was Hamilton Smith (1804–1875), a prominent attorney from Louisville, Kentucky. Smith's vision was to create a western milling center to rival Lowell, Massachusetts, but using steam-powered machinery fired by locally produced coal instead of the hydropower that ran the Lowell mills. The task proved too difficult for Smith and his associates, one of whom was Salmon P. Chase, later United States Secretary of the Treasury and Chief Justice of the United States, who became Smith's friend when both were students at Dartmouth College. Another was Indiana federal judge Elisha Mills Huntington. In 1851, control of the mill passed to brothers Dwight Newcomb (1820–1892) and Horatio Dalton Newcomb (1809–1874) who operated it successfully.

The mill closed in 1954. It was listed on the National Register of Historic Places in 1975 and became a National Historic Landmark in 1991. The adaptive restoration of the mill to a 70-unit, low-income apartment complex was completed in 2003.

== Location and construction ==
Located facing the Ohio River, the mill is 280 feet (85 m) long and 60 feet (18 m) wide. Its most striking features are 100-foot (30 m) twin towers, one housed a fire escape and the other was used for water storage and fire protection. The mill's style is Romanesque, but it was not built as Tefft originally designed it. Tefft's drawings called for each story to have different window heads and for dormer windows in the roof. His plan also called for a stepped foundation. As built, the dormers were eliminated and the remaining windows, except for those in the towers, were all capped with square lintels. A half-basement with square windows replaced the stepped foundation. The overall effect is much more severe than Tefft had intended.

== See also ==
- Cotton
- Cotton mill
- Child labor
- United States technological and industrial history
- List of National Historic Landmarks in Indiana
- National Register of Historic Places listings in Perry County, Indiana
