= Cannelton, Indiana =

- City
- City of Cannelton
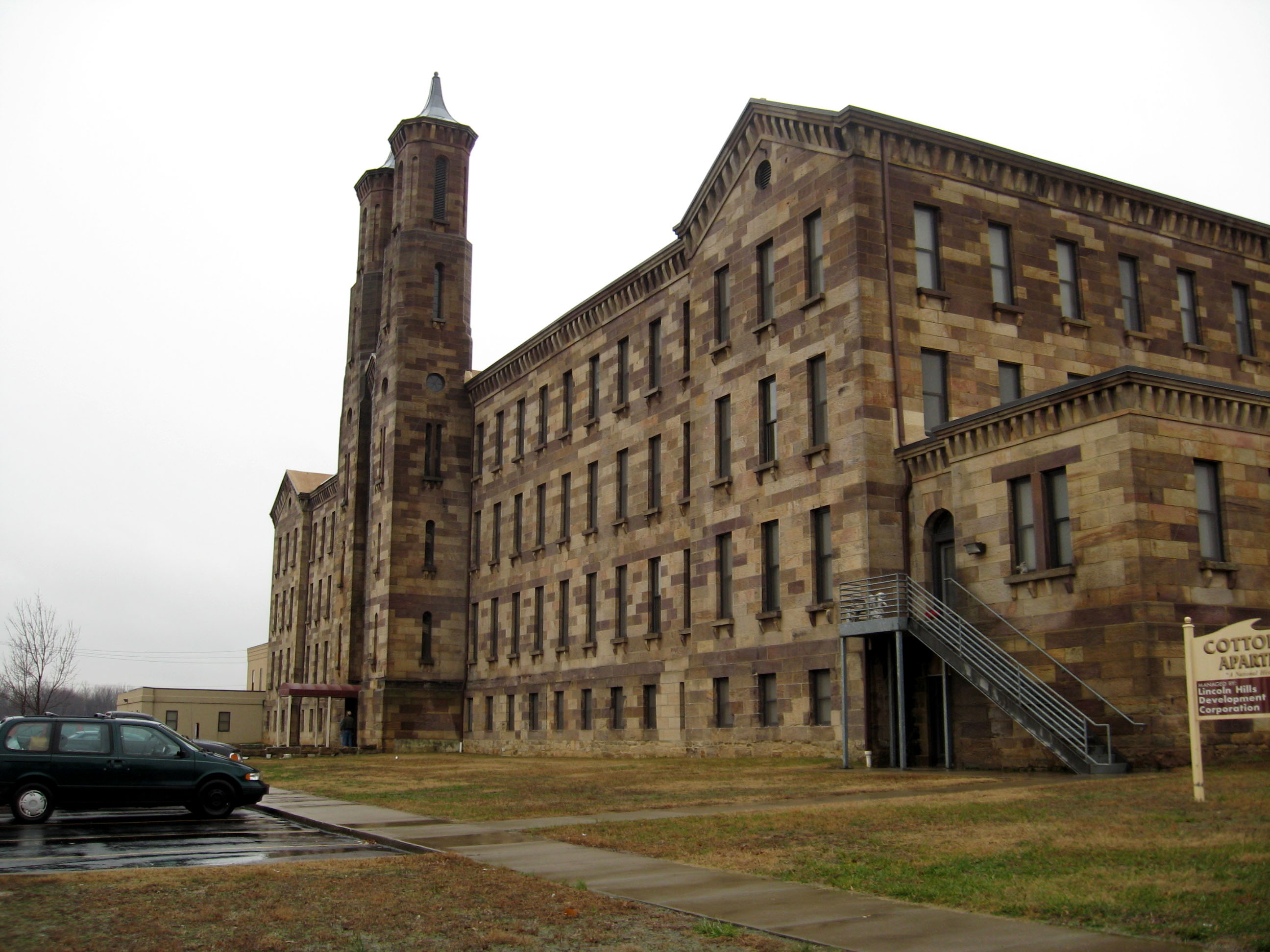
- Cannelton's landmark cotton mill

- Location of Cannelton in Perry County, Indiana.
- Coordinates: 37°54′46″N 86°44′45″W
- Country: United States
- State: Indiana
- County: Perry
- Township: Troy

Government
  - Mayor: Morris "Smokey" Graves (D)

Area
  - Total: 1.57 sq mi (4.07 km^{2})
  - Land: 1.48 sq mi (3.84 km^{2})
  - Water: 0.089 sq mi (0.23 km^{2})
- Elevation: 463 ft (141 m)

Population (2020)
  - Total: 1,524
  - Density: 1,028.5/sq mi (397.11/km^{2})
- Time zone: UTC-6 (CST)
  - Summer (DST): UTC-5 (CDT)
- ZIP code: 47520
- Area code: 812
- FIPS code: 18-10108
- GNIS feature ID: 2393730
- Website: www.canneltonindiana.com

Cannelton is a city in Troy Township, Perry County, Indiana, along the Ohio River. The population was 1,524 at the 2020 census. Cannelton was the smallest incorporated city in the state until 2010. It was formerly the county seat of Perry County from 1859 to 1994, when the seat was relocated to Tell City.

== History ==
The name Cannelton was adopted in 1844, and is derived from the cannel coal that was once mined in the area. A post office has been in operation at Cannelton since 1844.

The Cannelton Cotton Mill, Cannelton Historic District, and St. Luke's Episcopal Church are listed on the National Register of Historic Places.

== Geography ==
According to the 2010 census, Cannelton has a total area of 1.582 square miles (4.10 km^{2}), of which 1.48 square miles (3.83 km^{2}) (or 93.55%) is land and 0.102 square miles (0.26 km^{2}) (or 6.45%) is water.

=== Climate ===
The climate in this area is characterized by hot, humid summers and generally mild to cool winters. According to the Köppen Climate Classification system, Cannelton has a humid subtropical climate, abbreviated "Cfa" on climate maps.

Climate data for Cannelton, Indiana (1991–2020)
Month	Jan	Feb	Mar	Apr	May	Jun	Jul	Aug	Sep	Oct	Nov	Dec	Year
Mean daily maximum °F (°C)	42.3 (5.7)	47.5 (8.6)	55.3 (12.9)	68.1 (20.1)	75.6 (24.2)	83.2 (28.4)	86.8 (30.4)	85.9 (29.9)	80.5 (26.9)	69.8 (21.0)	56.7 (13.7)	46.2 (7.9)	66.5 (19.1)
Daily mean °F (°C)	34.4 (1.3)	38.0 (3.3)	46.0 (7.8)	56.8 (13.8)	66.3 (19.1)	74.1 (23.4)	77.9 (25.5)	77.0 (25.0)	71.1 (21.7)	60.1 (15.6)	47.5 (8.6)	38.5 (3.6)	57.3 (14.1)
Mean daily minimum °F (°C)	26.5 (−3.1)	28.6 (−1.9)	36.8 (2.7)	45.6 (7.6)	57.0 (13.9)	65.1 (18.4)	69.0 (20.6)	68.1 (20.1)	61.6 (16.4)	50.4 (10.2)	38.2 (3.4)	30.8 (−0.7)	48.1 (9.0)
Average precipitation inches (mm)	3.34 (85)	3.53 (90)	4.78 (121)	5.02 (128)	5.52 (140)	4.88 (124)	4.07 (103)	2.82 (72)	3.23 (82)	3.70 (94)	3.72 (94)	4.41 (112)	49.02 (1,245)
Average snowfall inches (cm)	3.5 (8.9)	2.8 (7.1)	1.0 (2.5)	0.0 (0.0)	0.0 (0.0)	0.0 (0.0)	0.0 (0.0)	0.0 (0.0)	0.0 (0.0)	0.0 (0.0)	0.0 (0.0)	3.4 (8.6)	10.7 (27.1)
Source: NOAA

== Demographics ==
Historical population
Census	Pop.	Note	%±
1860	2,155		—
1870	2,481		15.1%
1880	1,834		−26.1%
1890	1,991		8.6%
1900	2,188		9.9%
1910	2,130		−2.7%
1920	2,008		−5.7%
1930	2,265		12.8%
1940	2,240		−1.1%
1950	2,027		−9.5%
1960	1,829		−9.8%
1970	2,280		24.7%
1980	2,373		4.1%
1990	1,786		−24.7%
2000	1,209		−32.3%
2010	1,563		29.3%
2020	1,524		−2.5%
U.S. Decennial Census

=== 2020 census ===
As of the 2020 census, Cannelton had a population of 1,524. The median age was 39.0 years. 24.7% of residents were under the age of 18 and 16.3% of residents were 65 years of age or older. For every 100 females there were 96.6 males, and for every 100 females age 18 and over there were 91.8 males age 18 and over.

95.1% of residents lived in urban areas, while 4.9% lived in rural areas.

There were 652 households in Cannelton, of which 28.8% had children under the age of 18 living in them. Of all households, 33.4% were married-couple households, 22.2% were households with a male householder and no spouse or partner present, and 34.4% were households with a female householder and no spouse or partner present. About 40.5% of all households were made up of individuals and 16.1% had someone living alone who was 65 years of age or older.

There were 785 housing units, of which 16.9% were vacant. The homeowner vacancy rate was 3.3% and the rental vacancy rate was 10.2%.

Racial composition as of the 2020 census
Race	Number	Percent
White	1,413	92.7%
Black or African American	14	0.9%
American Indian and Alaska Native	4	0.3%
Asian	4	0.3%
Native Hawaiian and Other Pacific Islander	0	0.0%
Some other race	11	0.7%
Two or more races	78	5.1%
Hispanic or Latino (of any race)	18	1.2%

=== 2010 census ===
As of the census of 2010, there were 1,563 people, 687 households, and 385 families living in the city. The population density was 1,056.1 inhabitants per square mile (407.8/km^{2}). There were 809 housing units at an average density of 546.6 per square mile (211.0/km^{2}). The racial makeup of the city was 97.4% White, 0.1% African American, 0.6% Native American, 0.1% Asian, 0.4% from other races, and 1.3% from two or more races. Hispanic or Latino of any race were 0.8% of the population.

There were 687 households, of which 29.5% had children under the age of 18 living with them, 35.4% were married couples living together, 15.7% had a female householder with no husband present, 4.9% had a male householder with no wife present, and 44.0% were non-families. 39.4% of all households were made up of individuals, and 12.4% had someone living alone who was 65 years of age or older. The average household size was 2.23 and the average family size was 2.99.

The median age in the city was 38.5 years. 25.3% of residents were under the age of 18; 8.3% were between the ages of 18 and 24; 23.7% were from 25 to 44; 27.7% were from 45 to 64; and 14.8% were 65 years of age or older. The gender makeup of the city was 48.8% male and 51.2% female.

=== 2000 census ===
As of the census of 2000, there were 1,209 people, 509 households, and 297 families living in the city. The population density was 816.0 inhabitants per square mile (315.1/km^{2}). There were 577 housing units at an average density of 389.4 per square mile (150.3/km^{2}). The racial makeup of the city was 98.01% White, 0.08% African American, 0.33% Native American, 0.08% Asian, 0.50% from other races, and 0.99% from two or more races. Hispanic or Latino of any race were 0.58% of the population.

There were 509 households, out of which 26.9% had children under the age of 18 living with them, 44.4% were married couples living together, 9.4% had a female householder with no husband present, and 41.5% were non-families. 38.1% of all households were made up of individuals, and 19.3% had someone living alone who was 65 years of age or older. The average household size was 2.30 and the average family size was 3.08.

In the city, the population was spread out, with 23.7% under the age of 18, 11.2% from 18 to 24, 27.3% from 25 to 44, 21.8% from 45 to 64, and 16.0% who were 65 years of age or older. The median age was 37 years. For every 100 females, there were 95.3 males. For every 100 females age 18 and over, there were 96.6 males.

The median income for a household in the city was $27,361, and the median income for a family was $37,188. Males had a median income of $26,940 versus $20,174 for females. The per capita income for the city was $13,578. About 14.9% of families and 16.0% of the population were below the poverty line, including 21.1% of those under age 18 and 5.9% of those age 65 or over.

== Education ==
Cannelton has a public library, a branch of the Perry County Public Library.

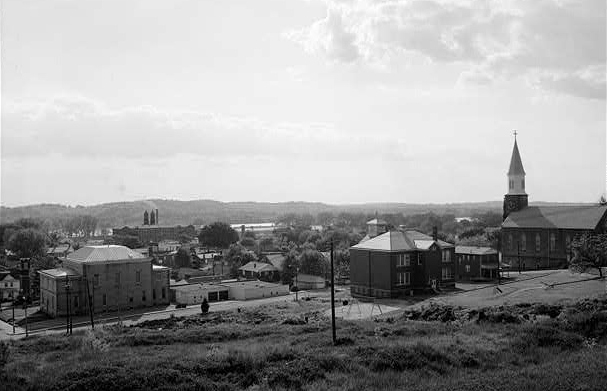
Cannelton, Indiana, 1974, looking southwest.

== Notable people ==
- William P. Birchler, state representative
- Tim Whelan, film director, writer, producer and actor

== Sites of interest ==
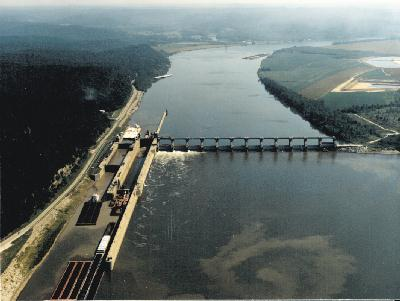
Cannelton Locks and Dam on the north bank of the Ohio River near Cannelton, Indiana.

- Cannelton Cotton Mill, built in 1849, was once the largest industrial building in the United States west of the Allegheny Mountains. It is now a National Historic Landmark.
- Cannelton Locks and Dam provides a 114-mile stretch of calm recreational water on the Ohio River between Cannelton and Louisville, Kentucky.
- Northwest Orient Airlines Flight 710 Memorial. 8 miles east of town off State Road 166.

== See also ==
- List of cities and towns along the Ohio River
