= List of United States post offices in Indiana =

United States post offices operate under the authority of the United States Post Office Department (1792–1971) or the United States Postal Service (since 1971). Historically, post offices were usually placed in a prominent location. Many were architecturally distinctive, including notable buildings featuring Beaux-Arts, Art Deco, and Vernacular architecture. However, modern U.S. post offices were generally designed for functionality rather than architectural style.

Following is a list of United States post offices in Indiana. Notable post offices include individual buildings, whether still in service or not, which have architectural, historical, or community-related significance. Many of these are listed on the National Register of Historic Places (NRHP) or state and local historic registers.

Post office	City	Date built	Image	Architect	Notes	Ref.
United States Post Office (Alexandria, Indiana)	Alexandria	1936			(Note: Houses the New Deal mural The Sledding Party by Roland Schweinsburg.)	
United States Post Office (Attica, Indiana)	Attica	1935		Louis A. Simon, Neal A. Melick	(Note: Houses the New Deal mural Trek of the Covered Wagon to Indiana by Reva Jackman.)	
United States Post Office (Aurora, Indiana)	Aurora	1935		Louis A. Simon, Neal A. Melick	(Note: Houses the New Deal mural Down to the Ferry by Henrik Martin Mayer.)	
United States Post Office (Batesville, Indiana)	Batesville	1936– 1937		Louis A. Simon	(Note: Contributing structure to the Central Batesville Historic District)	
United States Post Office (Bloomfield, Indiana)	Bloomfield	1939		Louis A. Simon, Neal A. Melick	(Note: Houses a New Deal artwork, the terra cotta bas relief Waiting for the Mail by Lillian Swann Saarinen.)	
United States Post Office (Boonville, Indiana)	Boonville	1939			(Note: Identical to the post offices in Ligonier, Indiana and Eaton, Ohio)	
United States Post Office (Brazil, Indiana)	Brazil	1911–1913		James Knox Taylor	(Note: Listed on the National Register of Historic Places)	
United States Post Office (Cambridge City, Indiana)	Cambridge City	1940		Louis A. Simon, Neal A. Melick	(Note: Houses the New Deal mural Pride of Cambridge City by Samuel F. Hershey.)	
United States Post Office-Columbus, now Viewpoint Books	Columbus	1897		Charles Franklin Sparrell	(Note: Contributing structure to the Columbus Historic District (Columbus, Indiana)) (Note: No longer used as a post office)	
Old United States Post Office (Columbus, Indiana)	Columbus	1910		James Knox Taylor		
Columbus Post Office	Columbus	1970		Kevin Roche, John Dinkeloo	(Note: Contributing structure to the Modernism in Architecture, Landscape Architecture, Design, and Art in Bartholomew County, Indiana, 1942–1999, National Historic Landmark Theme) (Note: First U.S. post office designed by privately funded architects)	
United States Post Office (Crawfordsville, Indiana)	Crawfordsville	1940		Louis A. Simon	(Note: Contributing structure to the Crawfordsville Commercial Historic District) (Note: Houses the New Deal mural Indiana Agriculture by Frank Long.)	
United States Post Office (Crown Point, Indiana)	Crown Point	1936		Louis A. Simon	(Note: Houses the New Deal mural From Such Beginnings Sprang the County of Lake, Indiana by George Melville Smith.)	
United States Post Office (Culver, Indiana)	Culver	1936			(Note: Houses the New Deal mural The Arrival of the Mail in Culver by Jessie Hull Mayer.)	
United States Post Office (Danville, Indiana), now Hendricks County Probation Court Building	Danville	1938			(Note: Houses the New Deal mural Filling the Water Jugs Haymaking Time by Gail W. Martin.)	
United States Post Office (Delphi, Indiana)	Delphi	1936		Louis A. Simon, Neal A. Melick		
United States Post Office (Dunkirk, Indiana)	Dunkirk	1939			(Note: Houses the New Deal mural Preparations for Dunkirk Autumn Festival by Frances Foy.)	
United States Post Office (Evansville, Indiana)	Evansville	1876–1879		Alfred B. Mullett, James G. Hill, William Appleton Potter		
U.S. Post Office and Courthouse, now E. Ross Adair Federal Building and United States Courthouse	Fort Wayne	1931–1932		Guy Mahurin, Benjamin Morris, James A. Wetmore		
United States Post Office (Fowler, Indiana)	Fowler	1939–1940		Louis A. Simon, Neal A. Melick	(Note: Houses the New Deal artwork Rest During Prairie Plowing, a cast stone sculpture by Nat Warner.)	
United States Post Office (Franklin, Indiana)	Franklin	1935		Louis A. Simon	(Note: Houses the New Deal mural Local Industry by Jean Swiggett.)	
United States Post Office (Gary, Indiana)	Gary	1906				
United States Post Office (Gas City, Indiana)	Gas City	1937			(Note: Houses the New Deal mural Gas City in Boom Days by William Adelbert Dolwick.)	
Hammond Post Office and Federal Building	Hammond	1939		Louis A. Simon, Neal A. Melick	(Note: Now owned by the Baptist Church)	
Birch Bayh Federal Building and United States Courthouse	Indianapolis	1902–1905		John Hall Rankin and Thomas Kellogg		
Broad Ripple Station Post Office (Indianapolis)	Indianapolis	1940–1941		Louis A. Simon, Neal A. Melick	(Note: Houses the New Deal mural Suburban Street by Alan Tompkins.)	
United States Post Office (Jasper, Indiana)	Jasper	1937			(Note: Houses the New Deal mural Indiana Farming Scene in Late Autumn by Jessie Hull Mayer.)	
United States Post Office (Knightstown, Indiana)	Knightstown	1936		Louis A. Simon, Neal A. Melick	(Note: Houses the New Deal mural The Evening Mail by Raymond L. Morris.)	
United States Post Office (Liberty, Indiana)	Liberty	c. 1937			(Note: Houses the New Deal mural Autumn Fields by Avery Johnson.)	
United States Post Office (Ligonier, Indiana)	Ligonier	c. 1938			(Note: Contributing structure of the Ligonier Historic District (Ligonier, Indiana)) (Note: Identical post offices were built in Boonville, Indiana and Eaton, Ohio.)	
United States Post Office (Martinsville, Indiana)	Martinsville	1935			(Note: Houses the New Deal mural The Arrival of the Mail by Alan Tompkins.)	
United States Post Office (Michigan City, Indiana)	Michigan City	1909		James Knox Taylor		
United States Post Office (Middlebury, Indiana)	Middlebury	1937		Louis A. Simon, Neal A. Melick	(Note: Houses the New Deal mural "Early Middlebury Mail" by Raymond Redell.)	
United States Post Office (Monticello, Indiana)	Monticello	1939		Louis A. Simon, Neal A. Melick	(Note: Houses the New Deal mural Hay Making by Marguerite Zorach.)	
United States Post Office (Nappanee, Indiana)	Nappanee	1935		Louis A. Simon, Neal A. Melick	(Note: Houses the New Deal mural Waiting for the Mail by Grant Christian.)	
United States Post Office (North Manchester, Indiana)	North Manchester	1935			(Note: Contributing structure to the North Manchester Historic District) (Note: Houses the New Deal mural Indiana Farm – Sunday Afternoon by Alan Tompkins.)	
Jacob Rickenbaugh House	Oil Township	1874		unknown		
United States Post Office (Pendleton, Indiana)	Pendleton	1936		Louis A. Simon, Neal A. Melick	(Note: Houses the New Deal mural Loggers by William F. Kaeser.)	
United States Post Office (Rensselaer, Indiana)	Rensselaer	1937			(Note: Houses the New Deal mural Receiving the Mail on the Farm by John E. Costigan.)	
United States Post Office (Rockville, Indiana)	Rockville	1937		Louis A. Simon, Neal A. Melick	(Note: Houses the New Deal mural Landscape by Milton Avery.)	
United States Post Office (Sheridan, Indiana)	Sheridan	1939		Louis A. Simon, Neal A. Melick		
United States Post Office (Spencer, Indiana)	Spencer	1938		Louis A. Simon, Neal A. Melick	(Note: Houses the New Deal mural Harvesting by Joseph Meert.)	
Terre Haute Post Office and Federal Building	Terre Haute	1934		Miller & Yeager		
United States Post Office (Tipton, Indiana)	Tipton	1936–1937			(Note: Houses the New Deal mural Indiana Farming by Donald M. Mattison.)	
United States Post Office (Union City, Indiana)	Union City	1936			(Note: Houses the New Deal mural Country Cousins by Donald M. Mattison.)	
