= Oil Creek =

Oil Creek may refer to:

== Communities ==
- Branchville, Indiana, also known as Oil Creek
- Oil Creek Township, Pennsylvania, in Crawford County
- Oil Creek Township, Pennsylvania, in Venango County

== Streams ==
=== Alaska ===
- Oil Creek (Kodiak Island County, Alaska), a tributary of the Pacific Ocean
- Oil Creek (Valdez-Cordova, Alaska), a tributary of the Gulf of Alaska
- Oil Creek (Valdez-Cordova, Alaska), a tributary of Katalla Slough

=== California ===
- Oil Creek (Contra Costa County, California), a tributary of Sand Creek
- Oil Creek (Fresno County, California), a tributary of Los Gatos Creek
- Oil Creek (Humboldt County, California), a tributary of Upper North Fork Mattole River
- Oil Creek (Humboldt County, California), a tributary of the Pacific Ocean
- Oil Creek (Humboldt County, California), a tributary of the Eel River
- Oil Creek (San Mateo County, California), a tributary of Pescadero Creek

=== Colorado ===
- Oil Creek (Teller County, Colorado), a tributary of Fourmile Creek

=== Indiana ===
- Oil Creek (Marion County, Indiana), a tributary of Payne Branch
- Oil Creek (Perry County, Indiana), a tributary of Ohio River

=== Missouri ===
- Oil Creek (Jackson County, Missouri), a tributary of Little Blue River

=== New York ===
- Oil Creek (Cattaraugus County, New York), a tributary of Olean Creek

=== Oklahoma ===
- Oil Creek (Johnston County, Oklahoma), a tributary of Washita River, left
- Oil Creek (Johnston County, Oklahoma), a tributary of Washita River via Randolph Lake, right
- Oil Creek (Le Flore County, Oklahoma), a tributary of Bear Creek
- Oil Creek (Love County, Oklahoma), a tributary of Hickory Creek

=== Pennsylvania ===
- Oil Creek (Elk County, Pennsylvania), a tributary of West Branch Clarion River
- Oil Creek (Lebanon County, Pennsylvania), a tributary of Swatara Creek
- Oil Creek (Venango County, Pennsylvania), a tributary of the Allegheny River
- Oil Creek (York County, Pennsylvania), a tributary of Codorus Creek

=== Texas ===
- Oil Creek (San Jacinto County, Texas), a tributary of East Fork San Jacinto River

=== Virginia ===
- Oil Creek (Greene County, Virginia), a tributary of Welsh Run

=== West Virginia ===
- Oil Creek (Braxton County, West Virginia), a tributary of Little Kanawha River

=== Wyoming ===
- Oil Creek (Weston County, Wyoming), a tributary of Beaver Creek

== Other uses ==
- Oil Creek State Park, Pennsylvania

== See also ==
- Oil Creek and Titusville Railroad, Pennsylvania
