= Bandon =

Bandon may refer to:

== Places ==
- Hundred of Bandon, a cadastral unit in South Australia
- Bandon (UK Parliament constituency), a former constituency (1801–1885) in Ireland
- Bandon, County Cork, Ireland, a town
- River Bandon, in Ireland
- Bandon Bay, a bay in the Gulf of Thailand
- Bandon district or Mueang Surat Thani district, an administrative district in Surat Thani province, Thailand
- Bandon, Indiana, United States, an unincorporated community
- Bandon, Oregon, United States, a city

== Other uses ==
- Earl of Bandon, a title in the Peerage of Ireland
- Bandon (Byzantine Empire), a Byzantine military and administrative unit
- Bandon railway station, a former station in Ireland
