= Community post office =

United States Postal Service facility

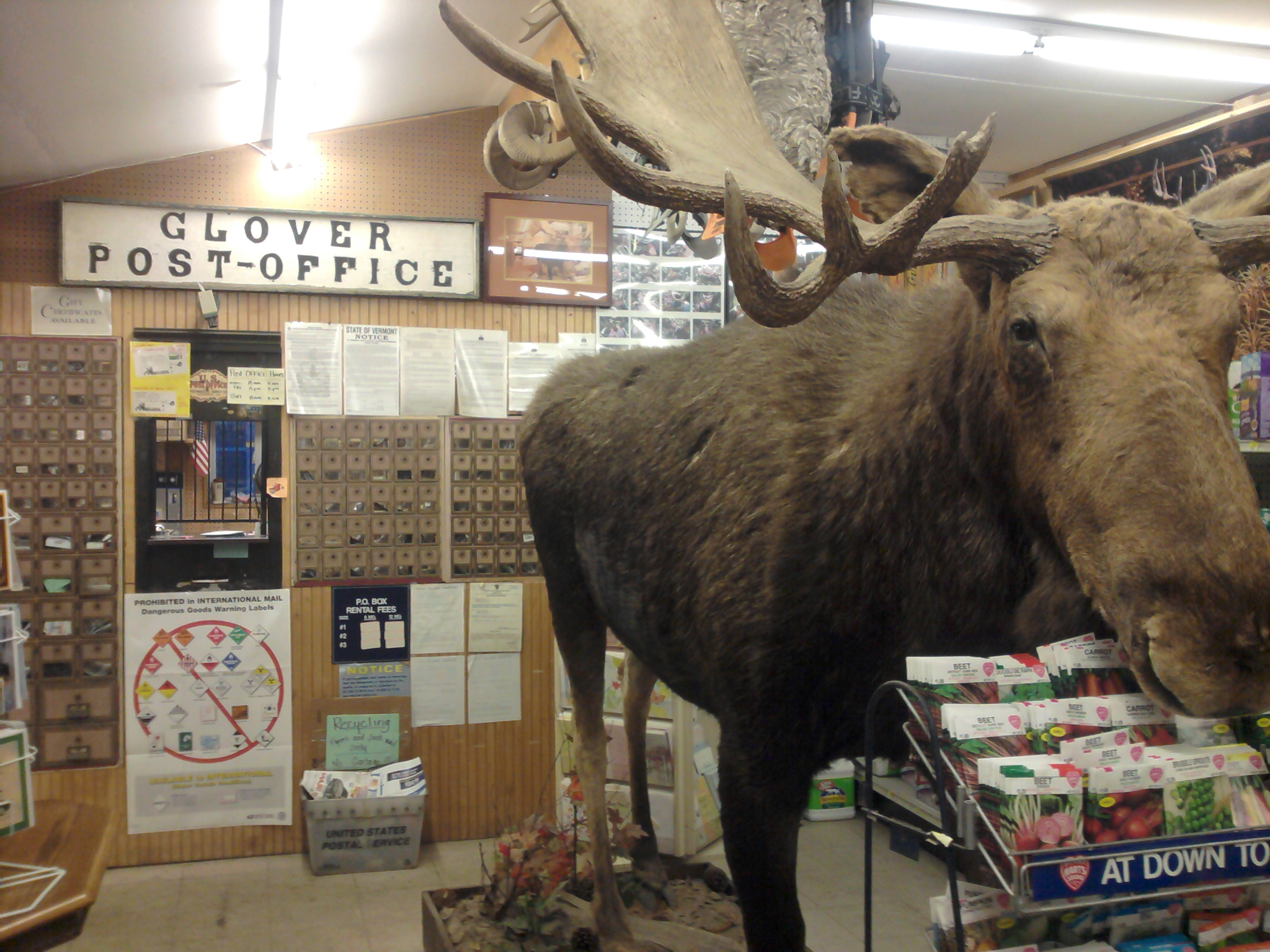
Interior of a community post office in Glover, Vermont

A community post office (CPO) is a facility of the United States Postal Service located in and operated by a non-postal facility, such as a store. Also known by other terms, such as "contract postal unit", or "contract station", such a facility is a post office selling postal products and services at prices identical to those of a regular post office. In exchange for staffing the post office with its own employees, the owner of the facility is paid by the Postal Service in proportion to sales. A similar concept, the "village post office", was introduced in 2011; like the community post office, a village post office operates out of a private facility, but it offers fewer services than a community post office.

Community post offices existed by the 1880s in various parts of the country, but they expanded rapidly during the Postmastership General of John Wanamaker. A prominent and innovative businessman of the Gilded Age, Wanamaker worked to place postal branches in small businesses, both to make postal services more convenient for the man on the street and to reduce the number of postal clerks needed at established postal facilities. As a result of Wanamaker's advocacy, drugstores in particular began to open postal counters (New York City drugstores opened fourteen contract stations in January 1890 alone), and while these counters rarely made profits by themselves, they created an opportunity for one-stop shopping that routinely prompted an increase in overall business for a store.

In the past, contract stations were not limited to commercial buildings; some post offices were even operated out of private residences. The Celina post office in southern Indiana was located in the Jacob Rickenbaugh House almost continuously from 1878 until 1961. Rickenbaugh's daughter and granddaughter were the postmasters for the majority of this period, and the post office operated out of a group of shelves in the house's parlor. Official standards in such contexts could be relaxed; the law required postmasters to be adults, but Rickenbaugh's daughter Ella became postmaster in 1878 at the age of seventeen. At the same time, the informal setting allowed for continuity; Ella served three terms as postmaster, only retiring at the age of eighty after nearly sixty years in the position, and her own daughter's twenty-year period of service ended only when the post office was closed in 1961, following the dissolution of the Celina community as the Forest Service was buying the surrounding countryside for the Hoosier National Forest.

Today, some contract post offices are operated by universities on their campuses. By maintaining a contract station, a university can set policies and provide services in accordance with its own needs, including retaining a percentage of sales for university coffers, permitting departments to purchase materials on account, conducting sales on a cash-only basis, and operating out of a popular location such as the student union.

== See also ==
- Public-private partnerships in the United States
