= McKinley School (Columbus, Indiana) =

- U.S. National Register of Historic Places
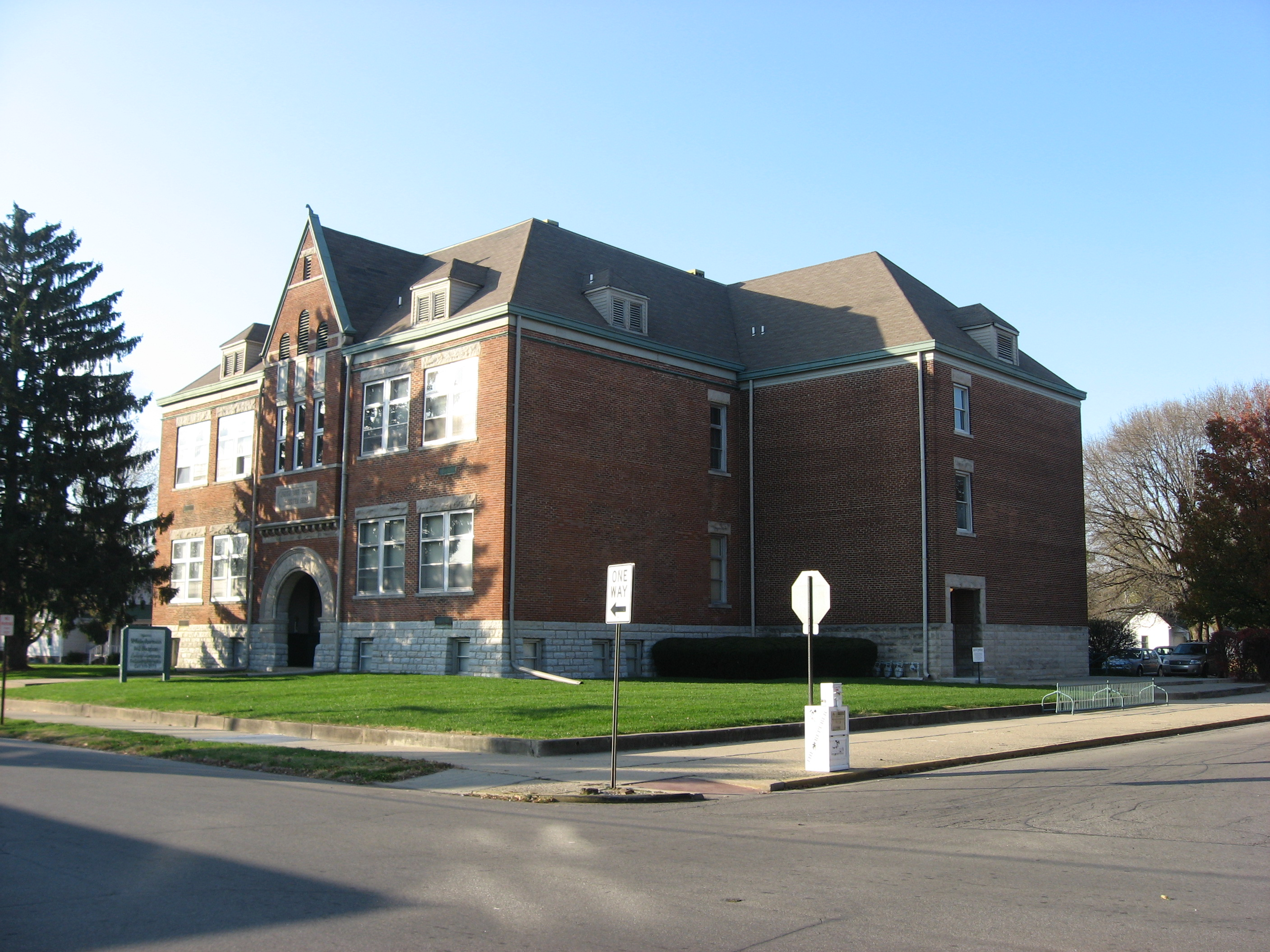
- Front of the school

- Location within Bartholomew County, Indiana Location within Indiana Location within the United States
- Location: Seventeenth St. and Home Ave., Columbus, Indiana, US
- Coordinates: 39°12′57″N 85°54′44″W
- Area: 1.2 acres (0.49 ha)
- Built: 1892, 1942
- Built by: W.F. Coats
- Architect: Charles F. Sparell
- Architectural style: Romanesque
- NRHP reference No.: 88001221
- Added to NRHP: August 25, 1988

The McKinley School, also known as North Side School, is a historic school building located at Seventeenth St. and Home Ave., in Columbus, Indiana, US. It was designed by architect Charles Franklin Sparrell and built in 1892. It is a 2 1/2 - story, five-bay, Richardsonian Romanesque style red brick building with a limestone base and hipped roof. It measures 73 feet wide and 38 feet deep. An additional structure was erected in 1942, and measures approximately 127 feet wide and 38 feet deep.

It was listed on the National Register of Historic Places in 1988.

== See also ==
- National Register of Historic Places listings in Bartholomew County, Indiana
