= Oil Township, Perry County, Indiana =

Oil Township
- Township
- Location in Perry County
- Coordinates: 38°10′47″N 86°33′49″W
- Country: United States
- State: Indiana
- County: Perry

Government
  - Type: Indiana township

Area
  - Total: 66.59 sq mi (172.5 km^{2})
  - Land: 66.38 sq mi (171.9 km^{2})
  - Water: 0.21 sq mi (0.54 km^{2}) 0.32%
- Elevation: 528 ft (161 m)

Population (2020)
  - Total: 2,545
  - Density: 38.34/sq mi (14.80/km^{2})
- ZIP codes: 47118, 47137, 47514, 47515, 47520, 47551, 47576, 47586
- GNIS feature ID: 453686

Oil Township is one of seven townships in Perry County, Indiana, United States. As of the 2020 census, its population was 2,545 and it contained 532 housing units.

Historical population
Census	Pop.	Note	%±
1890	1,992		—
1900	1,907		−4.3%
1910	1,735		−9.0%
1920	1,566		−9.7%
1930	1,348		−13.9%
1940	1,363		1.1%
1950	1,078		−20.9%
1960	806		−25.2%
1970	885		9.8%
1980	894		1.0%
1990	1,639		83.3%
2000	2,032		24.0%
2010	2,546		25.3%
2020	2,545		0.0%
Source: US Decennial Census

== History ==
Oil Township took its name from Oil Creek.

The Jacob Rickenbaugh House was listed on the National Register of Historic Places in 1984.

== Geography ==
According to the 2010 census, the township has a total area of 66.59 square miles (172.5 km^{2}), of which 66.38 square miles (171.9 km^{2}) (or 99.68%) is land and 0.21 square miles (0.54 km^{2}) (or 0.32%) is water.

=== Unincorporated towns ===
- Apalona at 38.154504°N 86.632208°W
- Bandon at 38.137282°N 86.600262°W
- Branchville at 38.163672°N 86.579706°W
- Celina at 38.188115°N 86.612763°W
- Doolittle Mills at 38.250893°N 86.603041°W
- Oriole at 38.168951°N 86.504703°W
- Saint Croix at 38.223949°N 86.586374°W

(This list is based on USGS data and may include former settlements.)

=== Cemeteries ===
The township contains these sixteen cemeteries: Bangle, Colby, Ewing, German Ridge, Guillaume, Jeffries, Jones, Luxenburger, Miller, Rickenbaugh, Senn, Sprinkle, Underhill, Valley, Walker and Woolums.

=== Major highways ===
- Interstate 64
- Indiana State Road 37

== School districts ==
It is in the Perry Central Community School Corporation.

Prior to 1962, Oil Township had its own high school. The school colors were green and white, and the mascot was the Oilers. That year, it merged into Perry Central High School.

== Political districts ==
- State House District 73
- State Senate District 47
