= The Crump Theatre =

Theater in Columbus, Indiana

- Crump Theatre
- U.S. Historic district – Contributing property
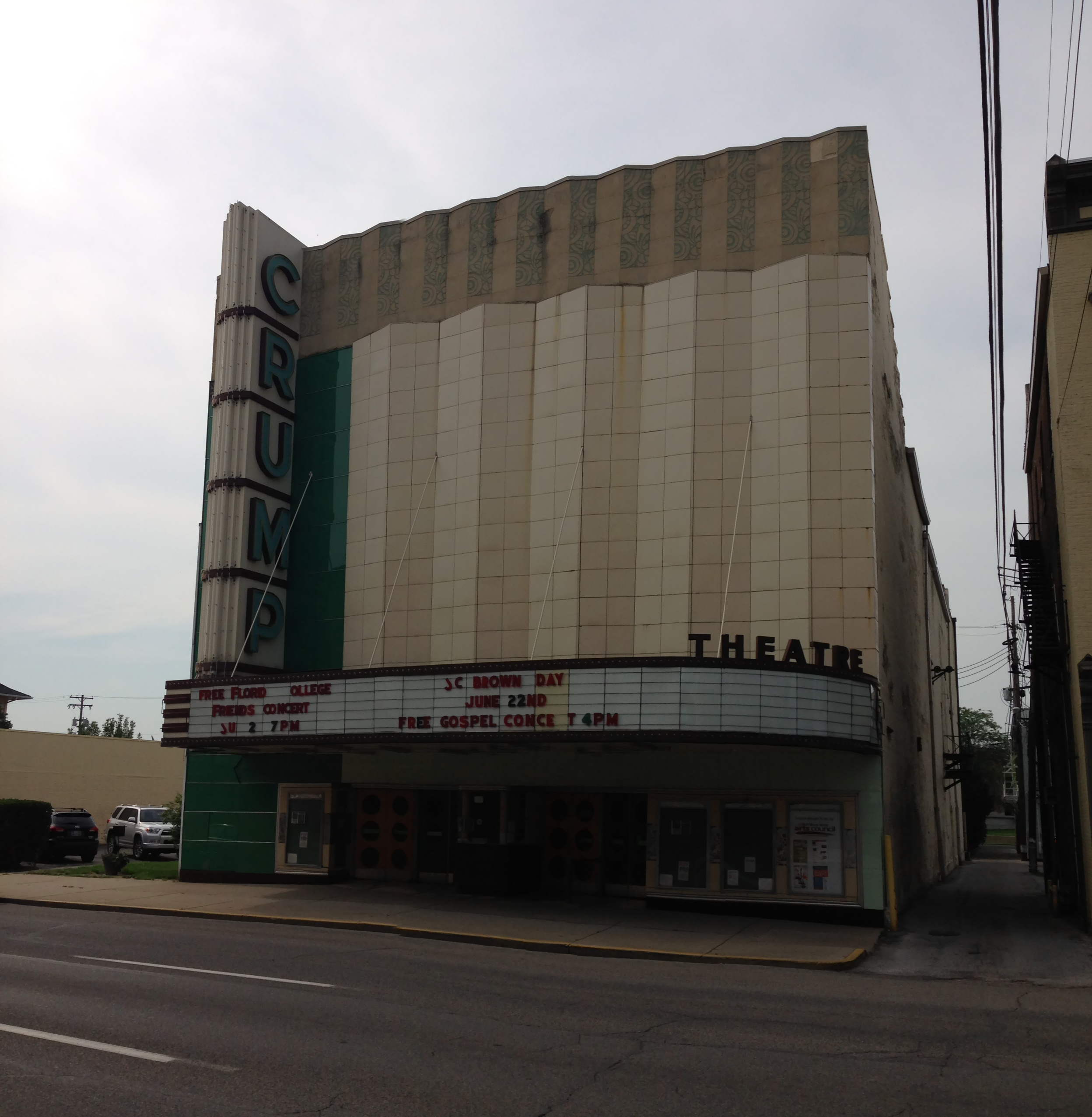
- Location: 423 Third Street, Columbus, Indiana
- Coordinates: 39°12′4.55″N 85°55′12.68″W
- Built: 1889, 1941
- Architect: Charles Franklin Sparrell, Alden Meranda
- Architectural style: Romanesque Revival, Art Deco
- Part of: Columbus Historic District (ID82000059)
- Added to NRHP: December 10, 1982

The Crump Theatre is located in downtown Columbus, Indiana, at 425 Third Street. It is part of the Columbus Historic District, which is listed on the National Register of Historic Places. The theatre is owned by the Columbus Capital Foundation and periodically used as an event space for a variety of acts, including musicians, comedians, and paranormal investigators.

== Early history ==
The theatre came into being in 1889 when Charles Franklin Sparrell was hired by John Smith Crump to add a theatre to an existing building at this site. Alden Meranda completed a renovation in 1941 that transformed the building into its current Art Deco appearance. In 2013 a theatre consulting firm, Jones & Phillips, was hired by the Columbus Redevelopment Commission to complete a study on the viability of the theatre.

=== Theatre beginnings, 1871–1889 ===
In 1871, Columbus, Indiana attorney Colonel John A. Keith contracted for a two-story building to be erected on the south side of Third Street between Washington and Franklin streets (today, 425 Third Street). This building was known as Keith's Arcade, but it is not known who the architect and builder were. Keith's Arcade was called an "arcade" building because of its architectural design, and had nothing to do with any amusement descriptive qualities of the word. A series of arches graced the facade, wrapping around doors and windows. Three arches adorned the top, and within the three arches, the words, "Keith's Arcade A.D. 1871", were incorporated into the upper part of each arch. From 1871 to 1889, merchants and businessmen from all walks of life rented out space in Keith's Arcade. Today's Republic newspaper got its start there in April 1872. During the 18 years the building functioned as Keith's Arcade, it was home to restaurants, a plumbing supply store, law offices, and a clothing shop, to name a few.

On December 3, 1888, Col. John Keith was placed in the Indianapolis Insane Asylum. At the time, Keith owed Frank T. Crump $28,000. In order to satisfy the debt, David Stobo, Keith's guardian as assigned by the court, had most, if not all, of Col. Keith's property sold at auction. The auction took place in the north room of the Courthouse, January 28, 1889. John Smith Crump, younger brother of Frank, acquired the Keith's Arcade property for $6,000.

=== Crump's New Theatre, 1889–1920 ===
Within weeks after the purchase, John Crump hired architect Charles Sparrell to draw up plans and specifications for a theater building to be constructed and adjoin the south side of the Keith's Arcade building. In March 1889, Crump and Sparrell traveled to Madison, Indiana to tour Louis Holwager's Grand Opera House. Crump was so impressed with this theatre that he had Sparrell design his new theater based on this design. On April 22, 1889, the contracting firm of Keller and Brockman was awarded the construction job.

Sparrell and Crump worked together in the selection of nationally renowned theatrical firms that specialized in interior theater design and scenic painting. In June, the Sosman & Landis Scene Painting Studio, Chicago, Illinois, was chosen to create scenic backdrops for the theatre. Thomas G. Moses was hired to paint the drop curtain. C. S. King was selected to build the necessary stage mechanisms needed to move the large, scenic panoramas and backdrops on and off stage. These artists were noted in the 1880s as being among the "finest in the country." Also, C. S. King had worked on some of the finest opera houses in the United States, Canada, and Mexico.

During construction of the theater auditorium, the old Keith's Arcade portion of the building was remodeled. The section underneath the middle arch became the entrance way to the theater. Ground floor rooms on either side of the entrance way were rented out for business purposes. Rooms on the second floor were rented out to day boarders. The words, Keith's, Arcade, A. D. 1871, embedded within each arch at the top of the building, were removed and replaced with "Crump's New Theatre." Crump's New Theatre opened October 30, 1889, with the Norcross Opera Company, Chicago performing the play, "The Pretty Persian," by well known French composer Charles Lecocq.

==== Community reception ====
The opening of Crump's New Theater was a milestone in Columbus' performing arts history. After several attempts to establish a venue for the performing arts in the town, Crump's New Theatre succeeded where its predecessors had failed. It was the first, stand alone opera house in Columbus. It was also the first theater designed around the needs and demands of the traveling shows of the day. The size of the stage could accommodate the large, hand painted scenes that were tailored specifically to a particular play, and carried by the more prestigious national troupes touring the country.

Crump's New Theatre functioned as an opera house and Vaudeville theatre for a period of about 30 years and resisted the move to become a Nickelodeon theatre. During the peak of Columbus' fascination with "moving pictures" (1908), there were six theaters in downtown Columbus (Crump included), with five showing motion pictures.

==== 1903 redecoration ====
The Theatre was redecorated over the summer months of 1903. Henry Ranje, who had done some fresco work at the Bartholomew County Courthouse, was hired to oversee the redecorating. Bink Schnur created a new drop curtain which replaced the old one which had scenes of Sicily, Italy. Walter Doup, a Columbus bill poster, and stage mechanic at the theater, updated the mechanics of moving the large sceneries on and off stage. The auditorium was also repainted using green, rose, and gold colors.

==== First motion pictures ====
The first motion pictures shown at the Theatre occurred on September 12, 1905, with the screening of The World In Motion, followed by a short movie that was filmed in Columbus. The movie showed workers leaving the Reeves and Company factory and the Columbus Fire Department driving up Washington Street. The official date recognized by Crump Theatre personnel at the time, however, was Thanksgiving Day, November 26, 1914, with the showing of When Broadway Was A Trail, and In The Lion's Den.

By the end of the 1910s moving pictures dominated the amusement offerings at the Crump. Eventually a second projector was needed so that longer motion pictures could be shown, which eventually required a substantial renovation in order to accommodate a larger projection room. However, before John Crump could realize his plan to enlarge the Theatre he died in 1920 at the age of 76.

=== Hege and Company remodel, 1920–1934 ===
The first remodel of the Crump Theatre was put in motion less than two weeks after the death of John Crump. With the theater passing to his children, they elected to stay true to their father's wish. On February 10, 1920, plans were hand carried to Indianapolis for approval by the State Board. On April 2, 1920, the contracting firm of Hege and Company were awarded the job with their bid of $35,000 (the company also acted as architect for this remodel). The Opera House Flats, a two apartment layout situated on the second floor, were vacated of all tenants, and the Clarence Howe Barber Shop and Columbus Realty businesses relocated to other parts of town. Work on the remodel began ten days later.

The 1920 remodel was a massive undertaking. Everything from the stage forward, to the Third Street sidewalk, was gutted (the east and west exterior brick walls were left untouched). The facade of the old Keith's Arcade building was removed entirely. What had originally been two separate and unique buildings (Keith's Arcade and the actual theater auditorium adjoining at the rear) became one. Heavier, balcony support beams replaced the posts inside the ground floor auditorium so that a second movie projector could be used. A mezzanine on the second floor was added. The box office was relocated to the front center of the ground floor mezzanine, and two new exits were installed on either side of the box office. The entire ground floor was ripped out and replaced with poured concrete. New carpeting and seats were installed. The men's and women's washrooms remained on the ground floor.

In September 1920, two new movie projectors and a new screen, a Minusa measuring 18' x 14', were installed.

During this first remodel, the theater was closed for five months. On Sunday, October 3, 1920, the Crump Theatre held an open house for public inspection. More than 3,000 people turned out to see the changes. According to reports in the Evening Republican newspaper, the Crump could now accommodate 2,000 people (more realistically, between 1,200 and 1,400 persons). With the addition of the upper mezzanine, dances were also a possibility. The theater was officially reopened the following evening, October 4, 1920. A sold-out house watched One Hour Before Dawn, starring H. B. Warner and Anna Q. Nilsson, and An Eastern Westerner, starring the ever-popular Harold Lloyd.

=== Rembusch remodel, 1934–1935 ===
By 1929, the Crump Theatre was under lease to F. J. Rembusch Enterprises out of Shelbyville, Indiana. Frank Rembusch came to Columbus between 1918 and 1920 and bought the Crystal Theatre, 416 Fifth Street, renaming it the American. On April 1, 1923, he leased the Crump Theatre from the Crump heirs. With the advent of movies offering synchronized sound in 1929, in March of that same year, Rembusch installed new Moviephone equipment. The first all talking movies were shown at the Crump on March 11, 1929 (Redskin, starring Richard Dix, and That Party In Person, starring Eddie Cantor).

On December 30, 1931, the Crump heirs sold the theater to Louis Holwager of Madison, Indiana for $50,000. It was Holwager's Grand Opera House in Madison, Indiana, that John Crump had used as a model for his theater. There was talk of another major renovation, but nothing transpired. On February 7, 1934, the Crump's lease fell to Truman Rembusch's Syndicated Theaters (Frank Rembusch's son). One week after the lease change, the second renovation commenced. At the top of the list was a new sound system. Less than one week after the lease was signed, a new RCA high-fidelity sound system and a new Vocalite movie screen were installed. The old acoustic panels were removed and replaced with an acoustic tile product called Nu-wood. This second remodel took five months. All of the work was contained to the interior, and the Crump remained open during most of the work. More comfortable seating was added on the main floor and balcony. All aisle seats now provided lighting. New carpeting was laid in the Lobby. The air conditioning system was updated. The bottom half of the interior Lobby walls were lined with black glass tiles incorporating aluminum frames for displaying one sheet movie posters. All remodel work was completed by July 13, 1934.

With the interior remodel work completed, Truman Rembusch turned his attention to the Third Street facade. Before any work commenced, however, on November 6, 1934, a contest was announced to change the name of the theater. Rules were simple: write the new name of the theater on a piece of paper and turn it in to management. First Place winner would be paid $25. Second Place winner would receive $15. Third and Fourth Place winners would receive $5. More than one thousand entries were submitted.

On November 14, 1934, the winners of the contest were announced to a packed auditorium. Louis Holwager, Truman Rembusch, and C. E. Rogers (Crump Theatre manager) were present, along with the panel of judges, consisting of Mrs. Philip R. Long, Mrs. Mary O'Bryan, Mayor H. Karl Volland, mayor-elect John L. Hosea and Walther E. Simmen. The winners were:

- 4th Prize – Mrs. Ralph Conrad for the name "Betsy Rogers."
- 3rd Prize – Tom Elrod for the name "Pioneer."
- 2nd Prize – Mrs. Jason Lacy for the name "Bartholo-di."
- 1st Prize – Mrs. Elsie Harris for the name "Von Ritz."

Although the Von Ritz was selected as the new name for the Crump Theatre, many in the community felt it wrong to cast aside the name of the theater's founder. Thus, the Von Ritz was never used.

In December 1934, new Sonotone equipment for hearing-impaired patrons was installed. A wide, vertical white stripe along the back of seats marked the designated seats. Beginning in early 1935, work on the facade began. The old canopy was removed and replaced with a three-piece marquee incorporating, for the first time, electric lights. Interior work also continued. A new mezzanine was located off the balcony. This new mezzanine included card tables.

Shortly after the completion of this second remodel, on April 26, 1935, Grammy Hall of Fame inductee Ethel Waters performed on the Crump Theatre stage.

=== Meranda remodel, 1941–1942 ===
In order to align the Crump Theatre more with the other two movie houses in Columbus (The Rio and the Mode), the third remodel of the Crump Theatre began in late 1941. The Rio, 416 Fifth Street, designed by architect Alden Meranda, and the Mode Theatre, 315 Washington Street, designed by architect William Pereira, both offered art-deco facades. Syndicated Theatres owner Truman Rembusch, who controlled all three theaters, felt it was time to give the Crump a new look. Comparing the looks of the Crump to either the Rio or the Mode gave one the impression that the Crump was terribly outdated. Even with the addition of the three piece marquee in 1935, the Third Street front still looked bland and old. It was time to bring the Crump Theatre up to contemporary standard.

Rembusch selected Meranda to do the work. Meranda had designed other theaters owned by Rembusch (the Artcraft, Franklin, Indiana and the Gibson, Batesville, Indiana). A vitrolite front was added. The three-piece marquee was removed and replaced with a two-piece marquee. Five-foot-tall letters spelling out Crump were vertically attached, and a single-piece marquee running the entire length of the front was installed. Hundreds of individual, incandescent light bulbs pulsed on and off along the horizontal marquee, drawing attention to movie titles and showtimes. The marquee was also back-lit using fluorescent tube lighting. In addition to the exterior work, interior changes were also made. The ticket booth was relocated to the outside. Entrances and exits were placed on either side of the ticket booth. The main-floor Lobby was enlarged. Main restrooms were relocated to the upstairs mezzanine. New water fountains were installed in the upper mezzanine. They were light activated and magically shot out a stream of water on bending over and breaking the beam of light.

== Crump Theatre ==
=== 1942–2013 ===
The end of World War II brought about an incredible boom in industry, housing and disposable income. From 1940 to 1970, the population of Columbus more than doubled in size. Due to the boom and increased population, the Crump Theatre reached its peak in popularity during this time. This popularity began to wane toward the end of the 1960s. As more and more strip malls and shopping centers invaded the suburbs, fewer and fewer people felt the need to shop downtown. In 1968, Columbus Cinemas, a two-plex movie house, opened for business. This, coupled with us becoming more of a mobile society, attendance at the Crump Theatre began to drop off. By the 1980s, the Crump could no longer compete with other local and regional movie theaters.

On Sunday, December 17, 1979, a building adjoining the Crump caught fire. The Crump sustained approximately $30,000 in smoke damage. Many historic artifacts were destroyed. The Crump was now owned by MARGRAT, Inc., Truman Rembusch's children. In April 1987, MARGRAT requested a bid from Shultz Excavating Company for demolition of the theater building. News of possible demolition came as quite a shock to the community. In order to keep that from happening, Vernon Jewell bought the Crump. The theater's lease with Kerasotes Theaters was not affected.

It was during this time that John Dorenbush, Irwin Management, approached Jewell. Dorenbush said a group of Columbus capitalists were interested in buying the Crump.

In May 1994, the Columbus Capital Foundation bought the theater from Jewell and took ownership. After an initial walk through, it was understandable why MARGRAT had sought a bid for demolition. The structure was in terrible condition. Part of the roof had collapsed. The boiler was no longer in working condition.

In 1994/95, "Save The Crump", a grassroots coalition, was formed in order to raise money to help stabilize the building. The group raised $150,000, and an additional $25,000 matching grant from the Indiana Department of Natural Resources Division of Historic Preservation. Most of the funds went to infra-structure, including a new roof and repair of the boiler system. Funds from the DNR went toward repair of the vitrolite facade and the marquee. A new electrical substation was also added. On January 31, 1995, Kerasotes' lease expired. The company elected not to renew it. The theater continued to operate for another two years as a dollar venue. In 1997, with the closing of the Crump in order to tear off the new roof and put the new one on, it ceased operation as a movie theater.

==== Recent performances and activity ====
In 2008 John Mellencamp held a concert in the Crump for a documentary style television show. The last time he played a show at the Crump Theatre was in 1976. There have also been four New Year's Eve events featuring local and regional acts put on with help from Columbus native Derick Howard, held at The Crump Theatre. Derick has also helped bring Ohio based band Ekoostik Hookah to the Crump four times and opened for them solo and with his band(Howard, Lewis & Lovins). Those and a few other shows that Derick has helped with have all averaged over 250 in attendance. Another show in recent years was Hoosier Dylan in 2009. It was a concert in which many musicians covered Bob Dylan's music, and was produced by Tim Grimm.

Another tribute concert performed here was a concert called "Hoosier Springsteen." It was also organized by Tim Grimm, and consisted of many different artists covering the music of Bruce Springsteen. The Crump Theatre is still used for other reasons besides musical performances. There were three performances of the play Arsenic and Old Lace (play) from February 12 to 14, 2010.

The Crump Theatre was investigated by Hoosier Paranormal Research in 2006. While there, they captured several instances of Electronic voice phenomenon. It was later discovered that one of the businesses next door to the Crump Theatre was a mortuary. In a later renovation of the theater the area that used to be the mortuary was merged into the theater. It was documented that the EVPs were recorded in this area of the Crump Theatre. The Crump Theatre also held a Paranormal Fright Fest on February 20, 2010. The Crump is not in current use and the door is locked.

==== Feasibility studies ====
There have been ten feasibility studies on the Crump Theatre. The first study dates back to the early 1980s when the newly formed Heritage Fund was looking for a project orientation to build an endowment. Upon Mayor Kristen Brown taking office in 2012, in April 2012, she organized the Crump Theatre Six Sigma Team to tie in with her ADVANCE COLUMBUS goals for the city. The Six Sigma Team's objective was to study the prior feasibility studies, determine why they failed, and explore options for Crump Theatre sustainability. This marked the first time such a comprehensive analysis was undertaken. When the team's studies were completed, based upon their recommendation, an outside firm was hired. In May 2013, the Columbus Redevelopment Commission hired Jones & Phillips Associates, Lafayette, Indiana, to perform the tenth feasibility study.

=== 2014–present ===
After completing their nine-month feasibility study, on March 24, 2014, Van and Linda Phillips, Jones and Phillips Associates, Lafayette, Indiana, presented their Crump Theatre findings to the Columbus Redevelopment Commission. The public was invited. During his presentation, Van Phillips pointed out several structural deficiencies that would warrant keeping the Crump Theatre closed. On April 1, 2014, Fire Chief Dave Allmon announced he would not allow the theater to reopen.

In the Jones & Phillips presentation, five options were offered. The options range from remodeling the theater to accommodate 300 – 350 people, to demolition of the historic structure (keeping only the vitrolite facade and marquee) and replacing it with a much larger auditorium that could seat 1,000 or 1,200 people (Jones & Phillips Associates presentation can be found on the City of Columbus, Redevelopment website). The Crump Theatre steering committee chose to pursue funding for a remodeling to accommodate 350 people. On June 3, 2014, the steering committee presented their recommendations and findings before the Columbus City Council with a price tag of $10.8 million. City Council consensus was the need to see a detailed business plan. On July 21, 2014, the steering committee requested of the Columbus Redevelopment Commission funding allocation for the business plan. Danielle, McClelland, Executive Director of the Buskirk-Chumley Theatre, Bloomington, Indiana, was selected as the source for the business plan. The Redevelopment Commission approved funding for the McClelland study and business plan with a lead time of 60 days. The Redevelopment Commission also approved additional funding in the amount of $500 for McClelland to present her plan before the public, Redevelopment Commission, and the City Council. Target date currently is the middle of September 2014.

=== Top 10 Most Endangered List ===
In April 2019 the Crump was placed on Indiana Landmarks' "Top 10 Most Endangered List." Since 2018 the theatre has been considered as a key part of the revitalization of the downtown area. With the designation the theatre has received statewide attention and a renewed interest.
