= St. Croix, Indiana =

- Unincorporated community
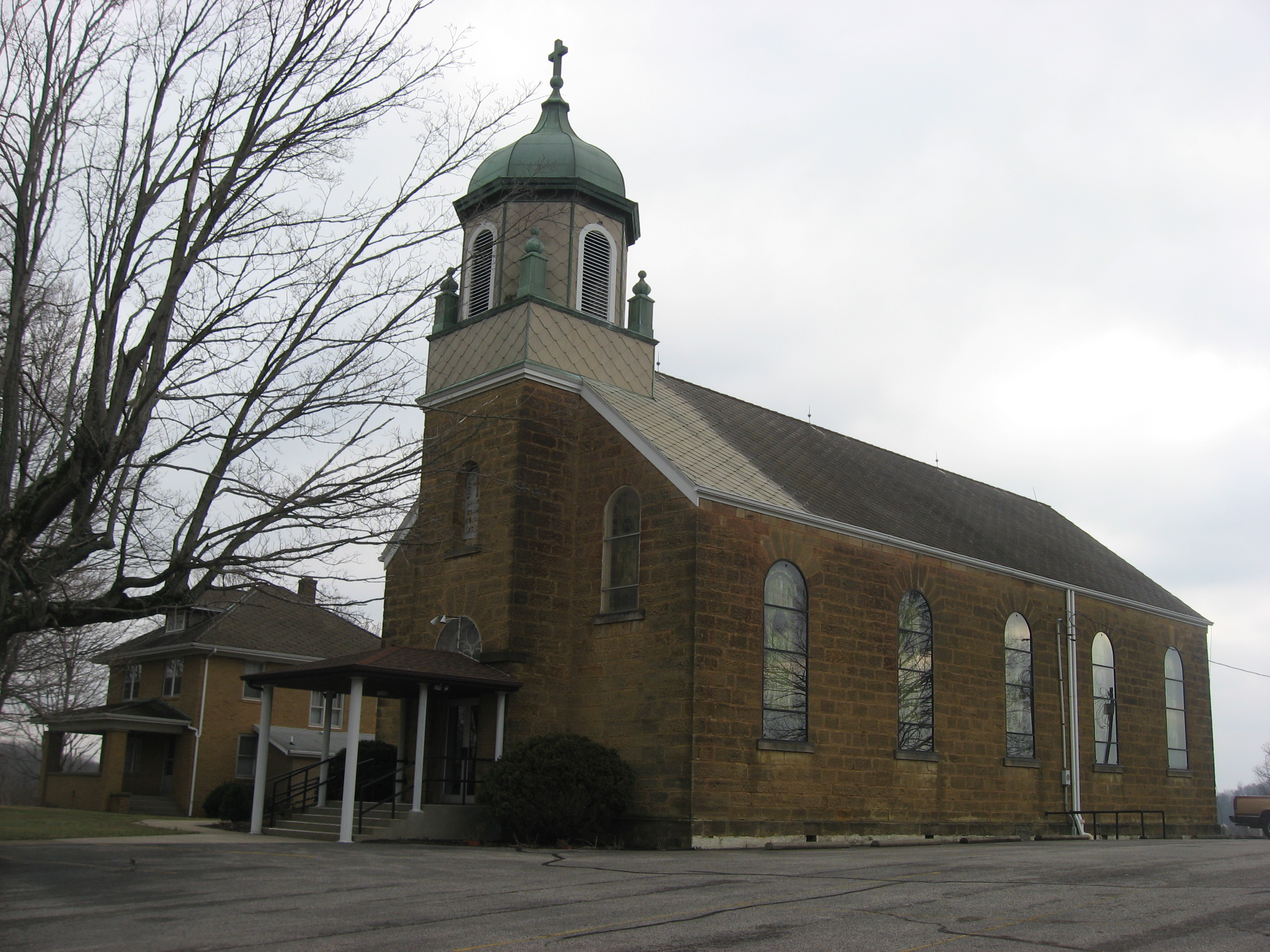
- Holy Cross Catholic Church, a community landmark

- Location within Indiana Location within the United States
- Coordinates: 38°13′26″N 86°35′11″W
- Country: United States
- State: Indiana
- County: Perry
- Township: Oil
- Elevation: 725 ft (221 m)
- Time zone: UTC-6 (Central (CST))
  - Summer (DST): UTC-5 (CDT)
- ZIP code: 47576
- Area codes: 812, 930
- GNIS feature ID: 451415

St. Croix or Saint Croix is an unincorporated community in northern Oil Township, Perry County, in the U.S. state of Indiana.

The community lies along on the western edge of the Hoosier National Forest, near the intersection of State Road 62, Interstate 64, and State Road 37, northeast of the city of Tell City, the county seat of Perry County. Main points of interest in St. Croix include Holy Cross Church, cemetery, and Church Hall as well as the Etienne Saw Mill and Bear Hollow Mulch. Although St. Croix is unincorporated, it had a post office, with the ZIP code of 47576.

== History ==
A colony of Catholics settled at St. Croix in 1849. The community's namesake St. Croix (Holy Cross) church was founded in 1855. A post office was established in St. Croix in 1880, but has since closed.
