= Columbus City Hall (Indiana) =

Building in Columbus, Indiana, US

- U.S. National Register of Historic Places
- U.S. Historic district – Contributing property
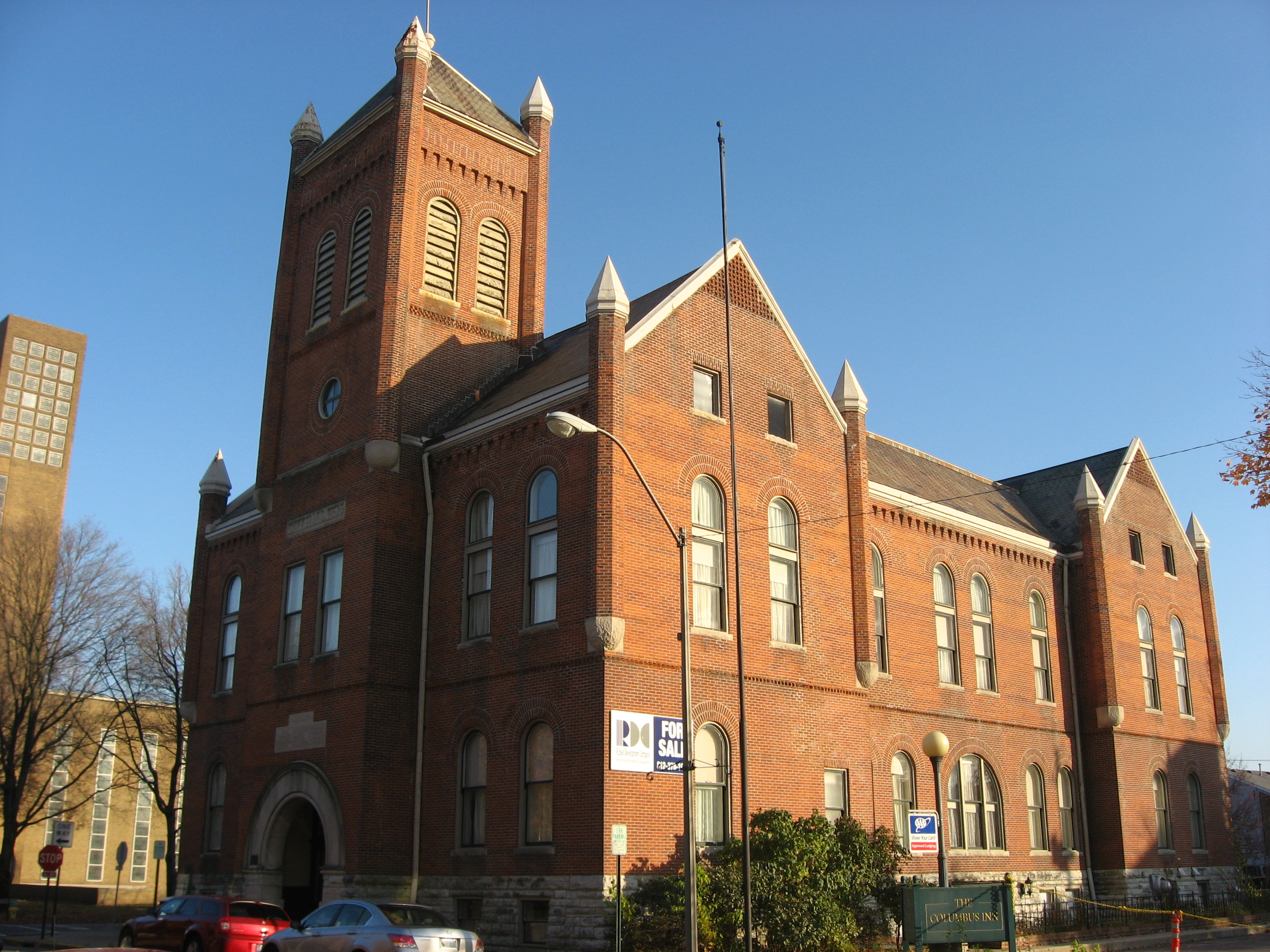

- Location within Indiana
- Location: 5th and Franklin Sts., Columbus, Indiana
- Coordinates: 39°12′11″N 85°55′13″W
- Area: 0.5 acres (0.20 ha)
- Built: 1895
- Architect: Sparrell, Charles F.
- Architectural style: Romanesque
- NRHP reference No.: 79000032
- Added to NRHP: November 15, 1979

Columbus City Hall is a historic city hall located at 5th Street and Franklin Street in Columbus, Indiana, United States. It was designed by architect Charles Franklin Sparrell and built in 1895. It is a three-story, Romanesque Revival style red brick building on a limestone foundation. It features a steeply pitched slate roof, prominent parapet gables, and four-story tower above an arched entrance.

It was added to the National Register of Historic Places on November 15, 1979. It is located in the Columbus Historic District.

== See also ==
- National Register of Historic Places listings in Bartholomew County, Indiana
