= Branchville Correctional Facility =

Correctional facility in Indiana, United States

Coordinates: 38°09′08″N 86°35′58″W

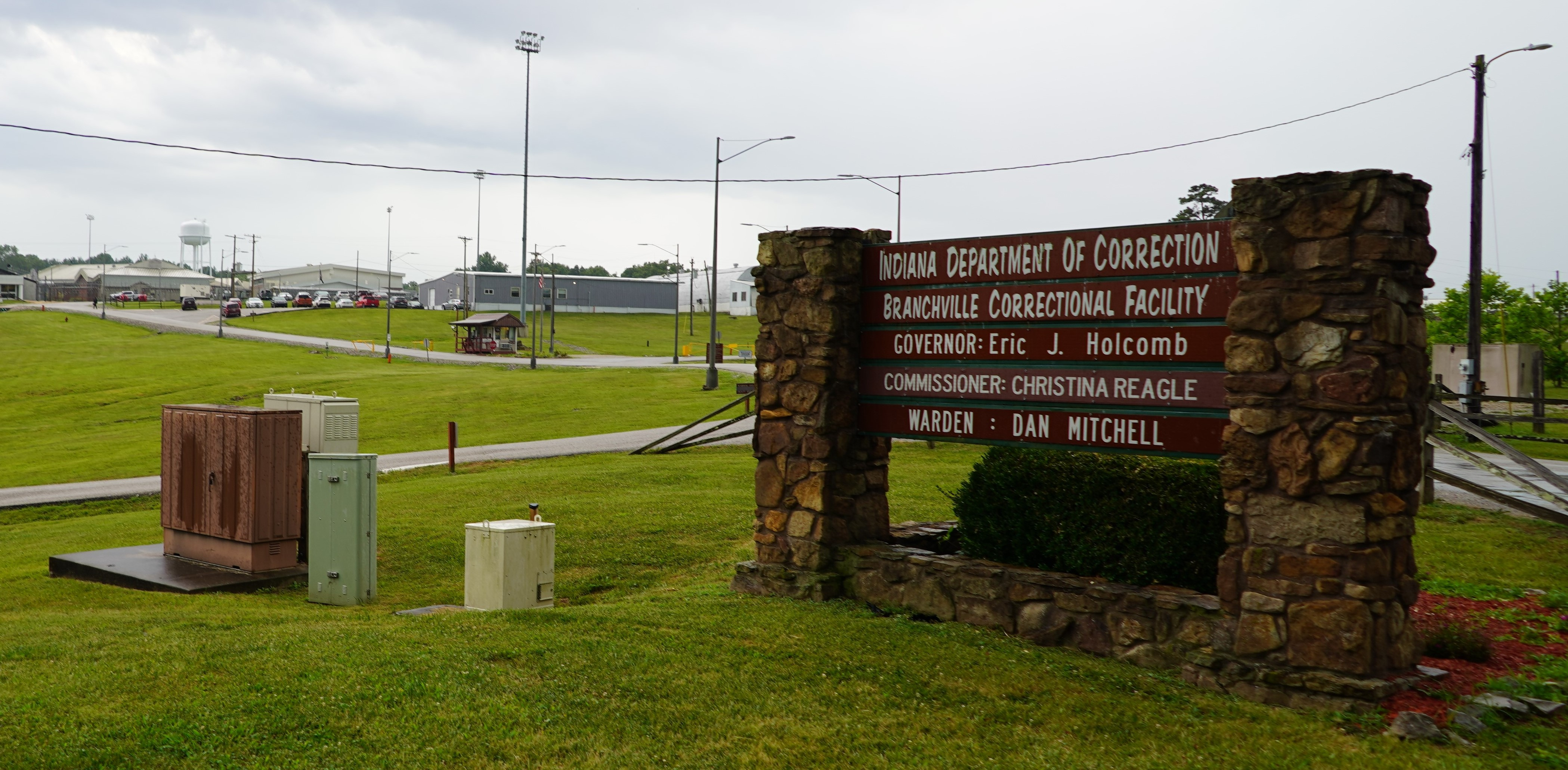
- Branchville Correctional Facility
- Interactive map of Branchville Correctional Facility
- Location: 21390 Old State Road 37 Branchville, Indiana
- Status: open
- Security class: medium security
- Capacity: 1530
- Opened: 1982
- Managed by: Indiana Department of Correction
- Director: Dan Mitchell, Warden

Branchville Correctional Facility is an Indiana Department of Correction state prison for men, located in Branchville, Perry County, Indiana, on the southern edge of the state. The prison is a medium-security facility opened in 1982 and has a capacity of 1,530.

As of 2019, the prison housed 1,448 inmates, and employed 256 staff.
