= Branchville, Indiana =

- Unincorporated community
- Location within Indiana Location within the United States
- Coordinates: 38°09′49″N 86°34′47″W
- Country: United States
- State: Indiana
- County: Perry
- Township: Oil
- Elevation: 436 ft (133 m)
- Time zone: UTC-6 (Central (CST))
  - Summer (DST): UTC-5 (CDT)
- ZIP code: 47514
- Area codes: 812, 930
- GNIS feature ID: 450702

Branchville (also Oil Creek) is an unincorporated community in southern Oil Township, Perry County, in the U.S. state of Indiana. It lies along CR40 northeast of the city of Tell City, the county seat of Perry County. Although Branchville is unincorporated, it has a post office, with the ZIP code of 47514. The Branchville Correctional Facility is located near the community.

== History ==
Branchville was platted in 1874. The community was named after a nearby branch of Oil Creek. A post office has been in operation at Branchville since 1878.
