= Apalona, Indiana =

- Unincorporated community
- Location within Indiana Location within the United States
- Coordinates: 38°09′16″N 86°37′56″W
- Country: United States
- State: Indiana
- County: Perry
- Township: Oil
- Elevation: 669 ft (204 m)
- Time zone: UTC-6 (Central (CST))
  - Summer (DST): UTC-5 (CDT)
- ZIP code: 47576
- Area codes: 812, 930
- GNIS feature ID: 450634

Apalona is an unincorporated community in Oil Township, Perry County, in the U.S. state of Indiana.

== History ==
The first post office at Apalona was called Lashers. The post office opened in 1858, was renamed Apalona in 1864, and closed in 1955.
