= Bandon, Indiana =

- Unincorporated community
- Location within Indiana Location within the United States
- Coordinates: 38°08′14″N 86°36′01″W
- Country: United States
- State: Indiana
- County: Perry
- Township: Oil
- Elevation: 725 ft (221 m)
- Time zone: UTC-6 (Central (CST))
  - Summer (DST): UTC-5 (CDT)
- ZIP code: 47514
- Area codes: 812, 930
- GNIS feature ID: 450651

Bandon is an unincorporated community in Oil Township, Perry County, in the U.S. state of Indiana.

== History ==
A post office was established at Bandon in 1905, and remained in operation until 1955. The community was named after Bandon, in Ireland.
