= Jacob Rickenbaugh House =

Historic house in Indiana, United States

- Rickenbaugh House
- U.S. National Register of Historic Places
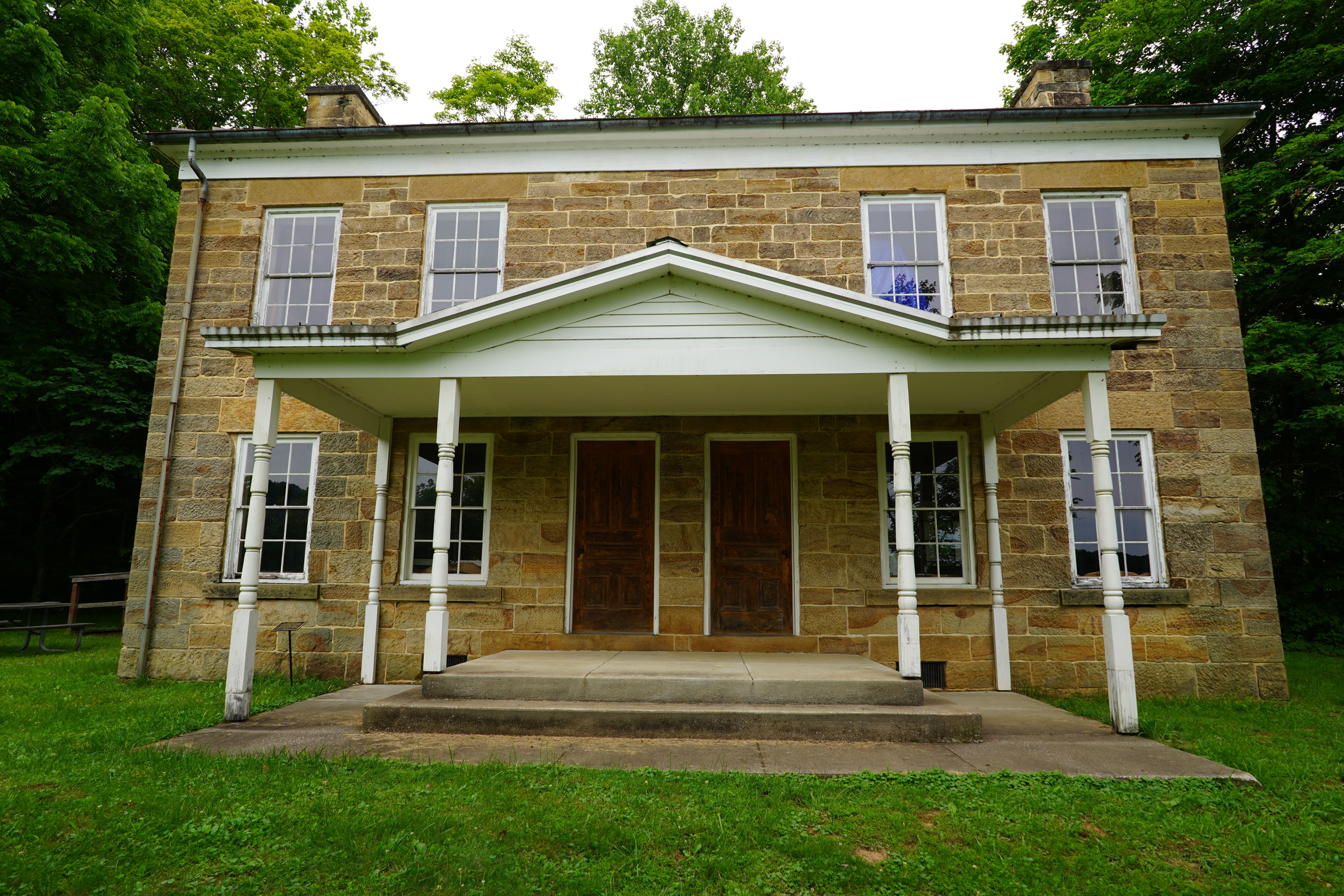
- Jacob Rickenbaugh House

- Location within Indiana Location within the United States
- Location: Southwest of St. Croix in the Hoosier National Forest, Oil Township, Perry County, Indiana
- Coordinates: 38°11′18″N 86°36′44″W
- Area: less than one acre
- Built: 1874
- Architectural style: Greek Revival
- NRHP reference No.: 84001215
- Added to NRHP: April 6, 1984

Jacob Rickenbaugh House is a historic home located in Hoosier National Forest, Oil Township, Perry County, Indiana. It was built in 1874, and is a two-story, "T"-plan dwelling constructed of ashlar sandstone blocks in the late Greek Revival style. It has a low pitched gable roof and side porches on each side of the rear ell. From 1878 to 1961, its parlor housed the Celina Post Office. It was acquired by the United States Forest Service in 1968.

It was listed on the National Register of Historic Places in 1984.

The house has been restored and is open regularly for self-guided tours in the spring-fall season.

== See also ==
- List of United States post offices
