= Charles Franklin Sparrell =

American architect

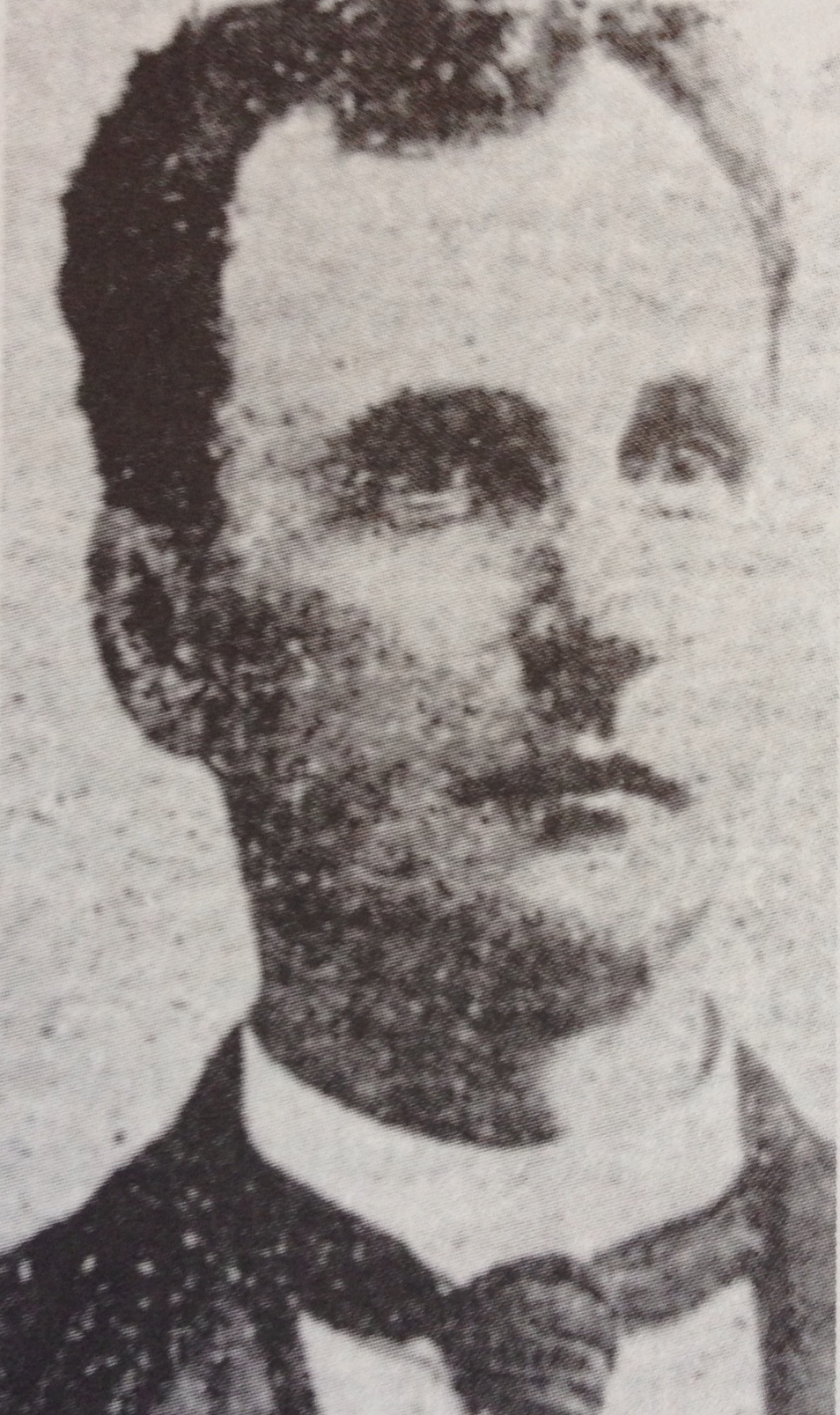
- Born: February 26, 1852; Boston, Massachusetts
- Died: February 24, 1934 (aged 81); Newport, Kentucky
- Occupation: Architect
- Buildings: Columbus City Hall The Crump Theatre McKinley School

Charles Franklin Sparrell was born in Boston, Massachusetts in 1852 and died in Newport, Kentucky in 1934. His father was John Turner Sparrell Jr., a marble worker and farmer. His mother was Elizabeth Ann (Provoost) Sparrell. He was the most influential architect in the city of Columbus, Indiana in the late 19th century. When he arrived in the city in the early 1880s he was credited with having attended an "institute of technology" in Massachusetts, but the Massachusetts Institute of Technology does not list him as an alumnus. More than 10 of his buildings remain in the city, many of which are on the National Register of Historic Places listings in Bartholomew County, Indiana.

== Architectural career ==
Before starting his own practice, he worked for Hege and Company Contracting as a shop foreman. His own offices were located on 330, 332, and 334 Fifth Street and his employees included Georgia Wills, a woman who worked for him as an assistant draftsman.

Among his most notable buildings are the Columbus City Hall and the Maple Grove School.

Columbus City Hall was completed in 1895 and remains at 445 Fifth Street. Today it is operated as an apartment complex. This brick Romanesque Revival building features a tall, square bell tower and limestone detailing. When first opened it contained the police station and the jail. It also had a banquet hall, a dance hall, a basketball court, and an exhibit area. A farmers market operated out of the basement that opened to the public on the west side of the street.

While the Maple Grove School has been home to a variety of organizations and was quickly renamed the Garfield Elementary School, it was built in 1896 as a four classroom school house. In the late 1980s Arvin Industries renovated and expanded the building to serve as the company's headquarters. Today it serves as the administrative building for the Bartholomew Consolidated School Corporation.

== List of buildings designed by Sparrell ==
It is not clear if the former A. J. Banker's Hospital or Reeves Pulley Company were designed by Sparrell; only one published source indicates he designed these buildings.

Image	Name	Address	GPS Coordinates	Year Completed
	Ruddick-Nugent House	1210 16th Street	39°12′54.02″N 85°54′41.31″W	1884
	Fehring Block	520 Washington Street	39°12′14.24″N 85°55′16.74″W	1885
	Central Christian Church	628 7th Street	39°12′20.95″N 85°55′4.07″W	1886
	Washington School	718 Pearl Street	39°12′22.68″N 85°55′3″W	1887
	First United Methodist Church	618 8th Street	39°12′24.92″N 85°55′6.2″W	1887
	The Crump Theatre	425 Third Street	39°12′4.7″N 85°55′12.67″W	1889
	J. Will Prall House	605 Fifth Street	39°12′12.34″N 85°55′5.58″W	1891
	Odd Fellows Hall	601 Washington	39°12′16.38″N 85°55′15.7″W	1891
	McKinley School	1198 17th Street	39°12′57.32″N 85°54′44.78″W	1892
	Columbus City Hall	445 Fifth Street	39°12′12.19″N 85°55′11.89″W	1895
	Overstreet House	1034 Washington Street	39°12′32.9″N 85°55′18.36″W	1895
	Maple Grove School	One Norbitt Plaza	39°12′39.78″N 85°54′17.95″W	1896
	U.S. Post Office	548 Washington Street	39°12′16.41″N 85°55′16.9″W	1897
	Crump House	1008 Washington Street	39°12′30.5″N 85°55′17.9″W	(?)
