= Columbus Historic District (Columbus, Indiana) =

Historic district in Indiana, United States

- U.S. National Register of Historic Places
- U.S. Historic district
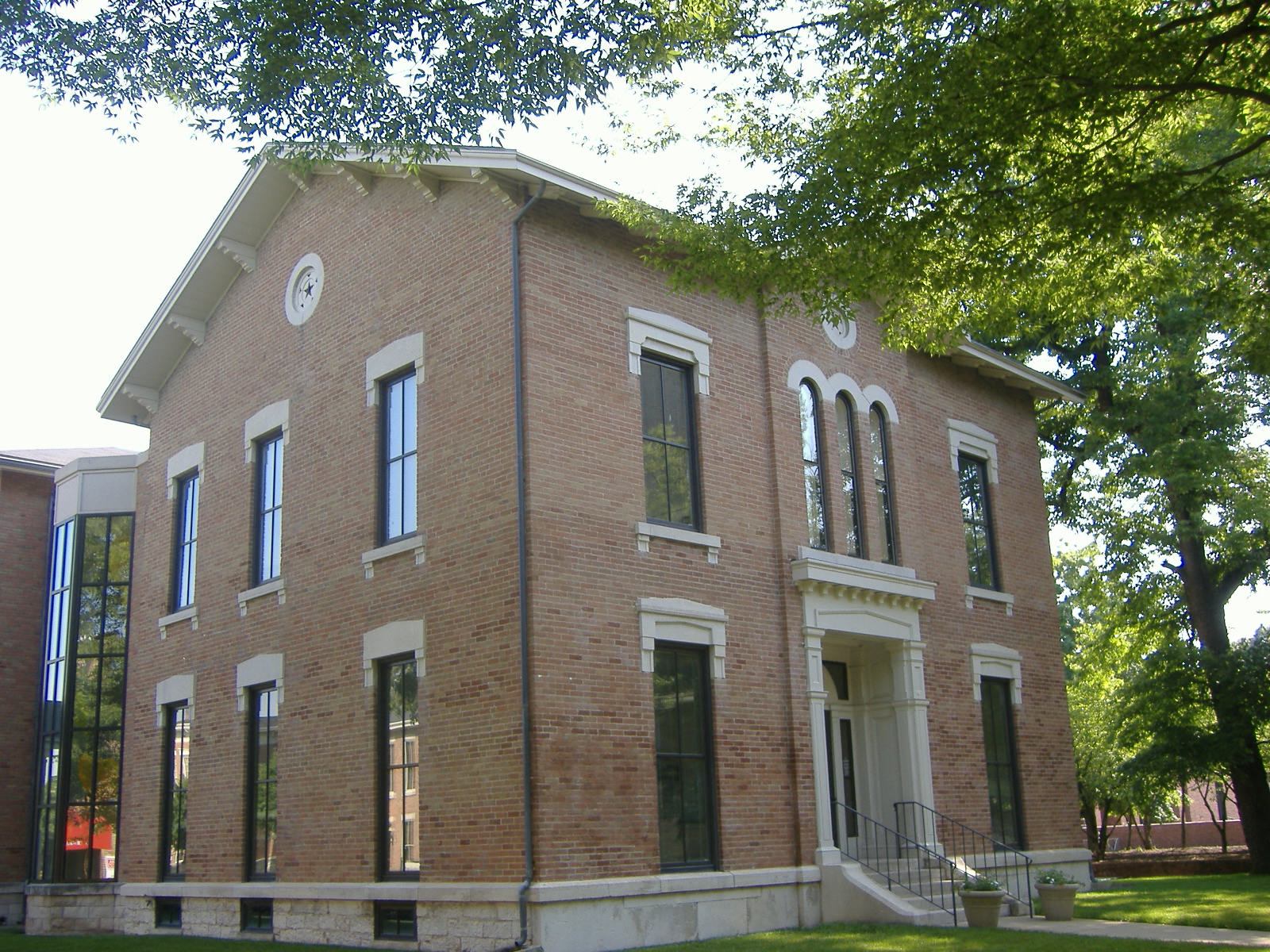
- Columbus Visitor Center, June 2008

- Location within Bartholomew County, Indiana Location within Indiana Location within the United States
- Location: Roughly bounded by the Pennsylvania RR tracks, Chestnut, 34th, Washington, and Franklin Sts., Columbus, Indiana
- Coordinates: 39°12′23″N 85°55′04″W
- Area: 182 acres (74 ha)
- Built: 1821
- Architect: Multiple
- Architectural style: Italianate, Federal, Cross Plan Cottage
- NRHP reference No.: 82000059
- Added to NRHP: December 10, 1982

Columbus Historic District is a national historic district located at Columbus, Indiana, United States. It encompasses 574 contributing buildings and 1 contributing sites in the central business district and surrounding residential areas of Columbus. It was developed between about 1850 and 1930, and includes notable examples of Federal and Italianate style architecture. A number of commercial buildings feature locally manufactured cast iron and pressed metal components. Located in the district are the separately listed Bartholomew County Courthouse, Columbus City Hall, and First Christian Church. Other notable buildings include the First National Bank, The Crump Theatre (1889), Reo Theater, Ulrich Bakery (c. 1850), Samuel Harris House (1853), Keller House (1860), Old Post Office (1910), Franklin Building (c. 1870), Gent Mill (c. 1875), First United Presbyterian Church (1871–1885), Irwin Block (c. 1890), Irwin Home and Gardens (1864, 1910), and St. Batholomew's Roman Catholic Church (1891).

It was listed on the National Register of Historic Places in 1982.

== Gallery ==
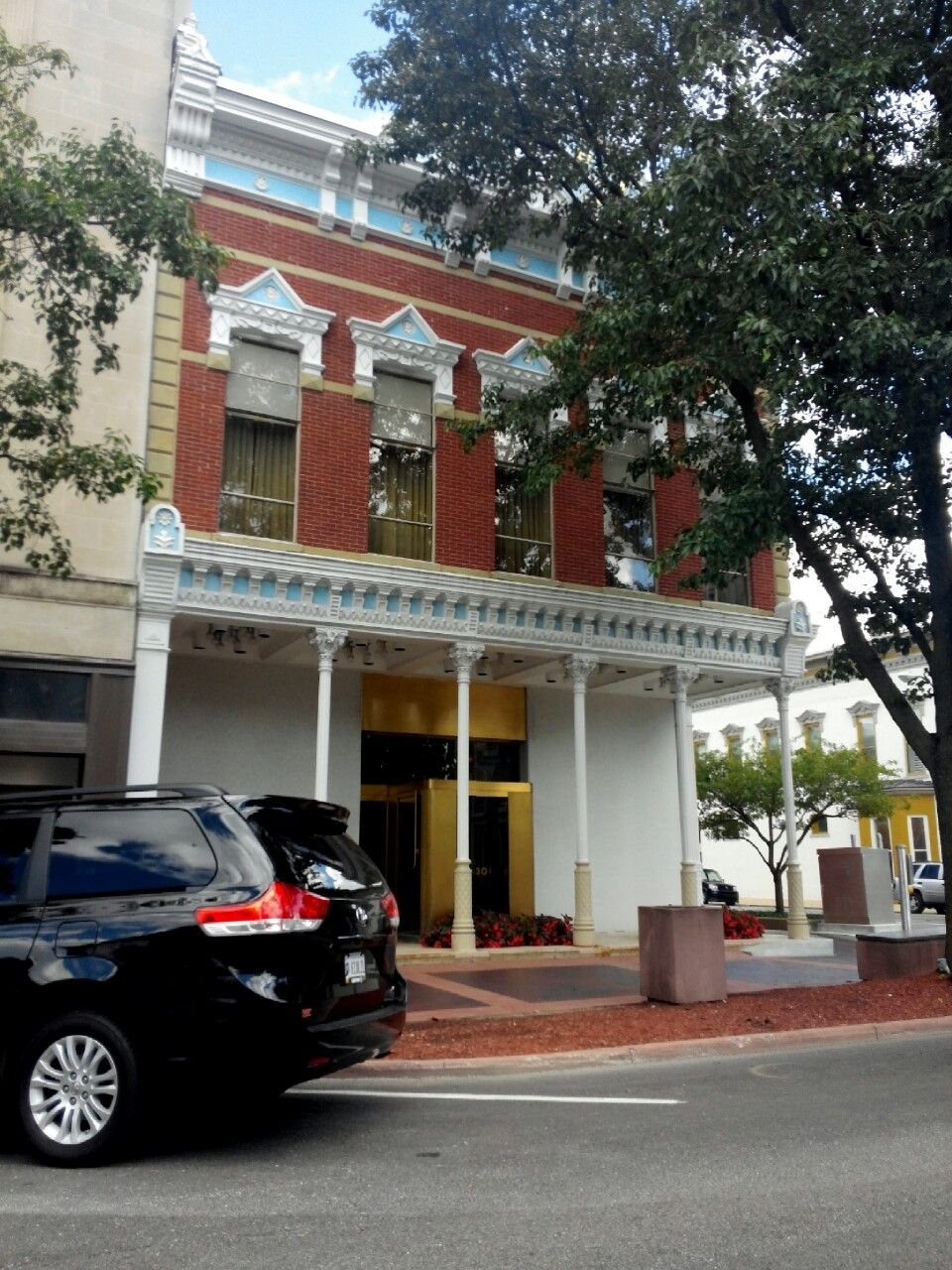
Irwin's Bank Building - 2016

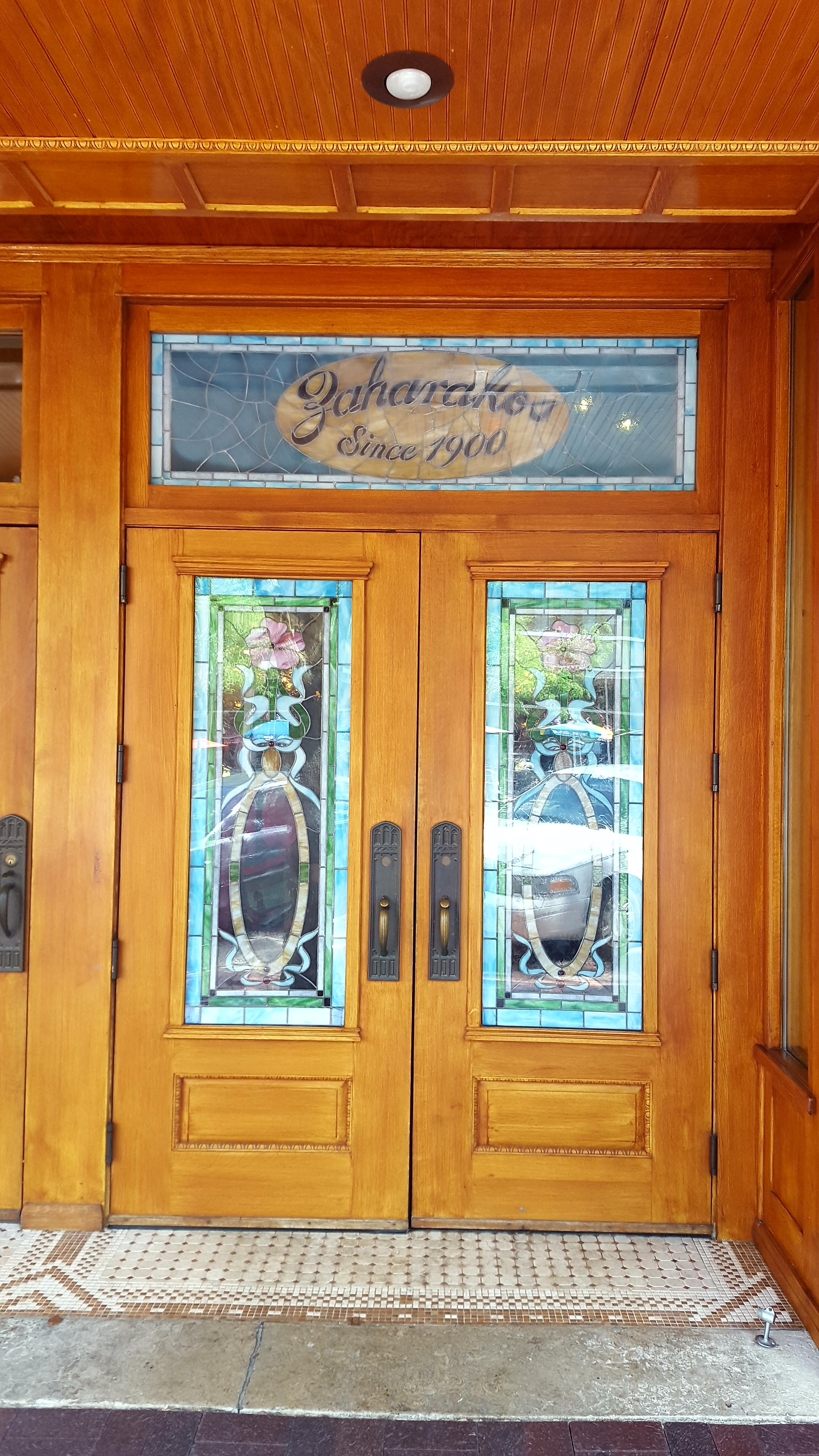
Zaharakos Ice Cream Parlor - 2016

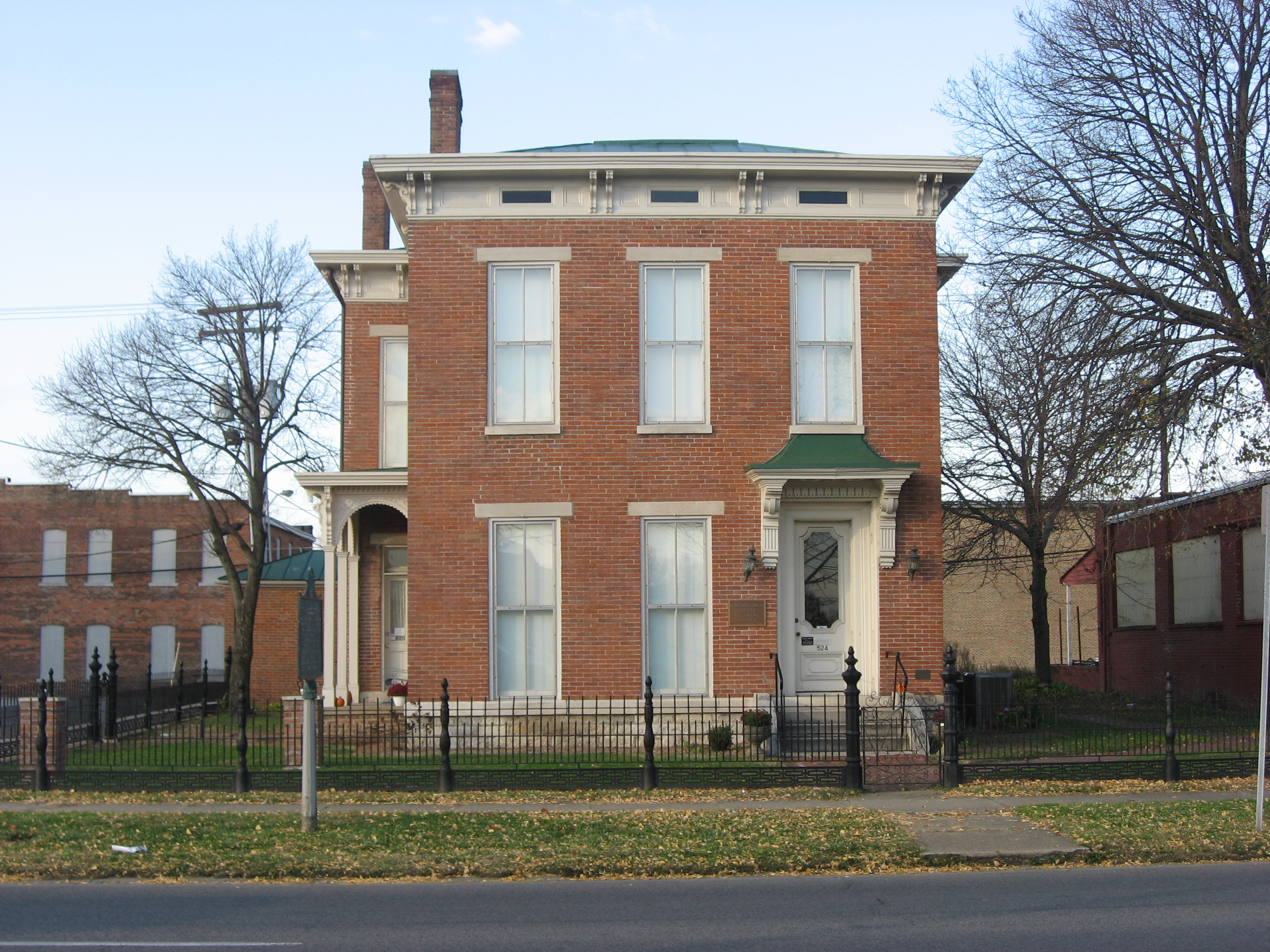
McEwen-Samuels-Marr House - 2009

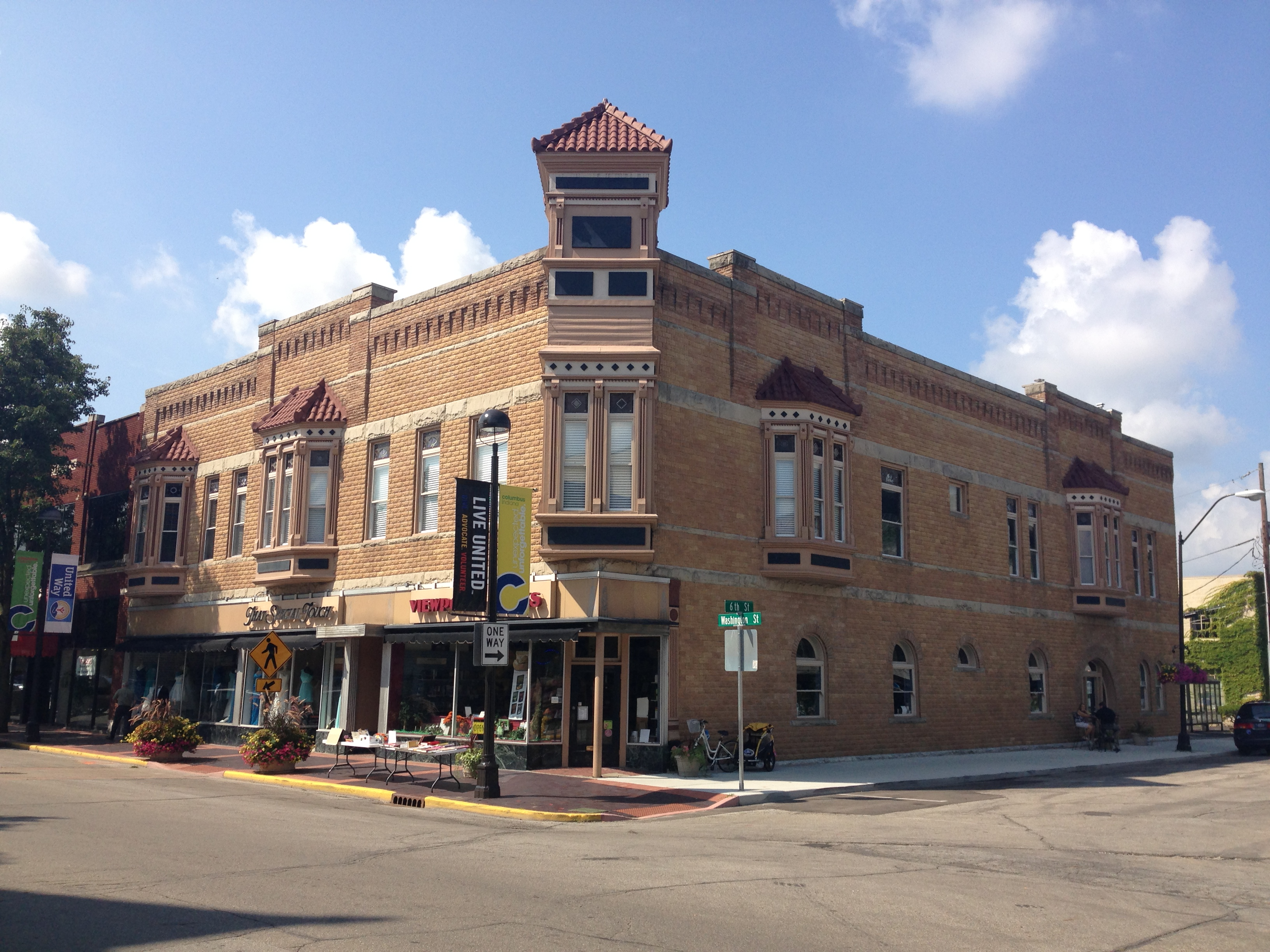
U.S. Post Office - 2019

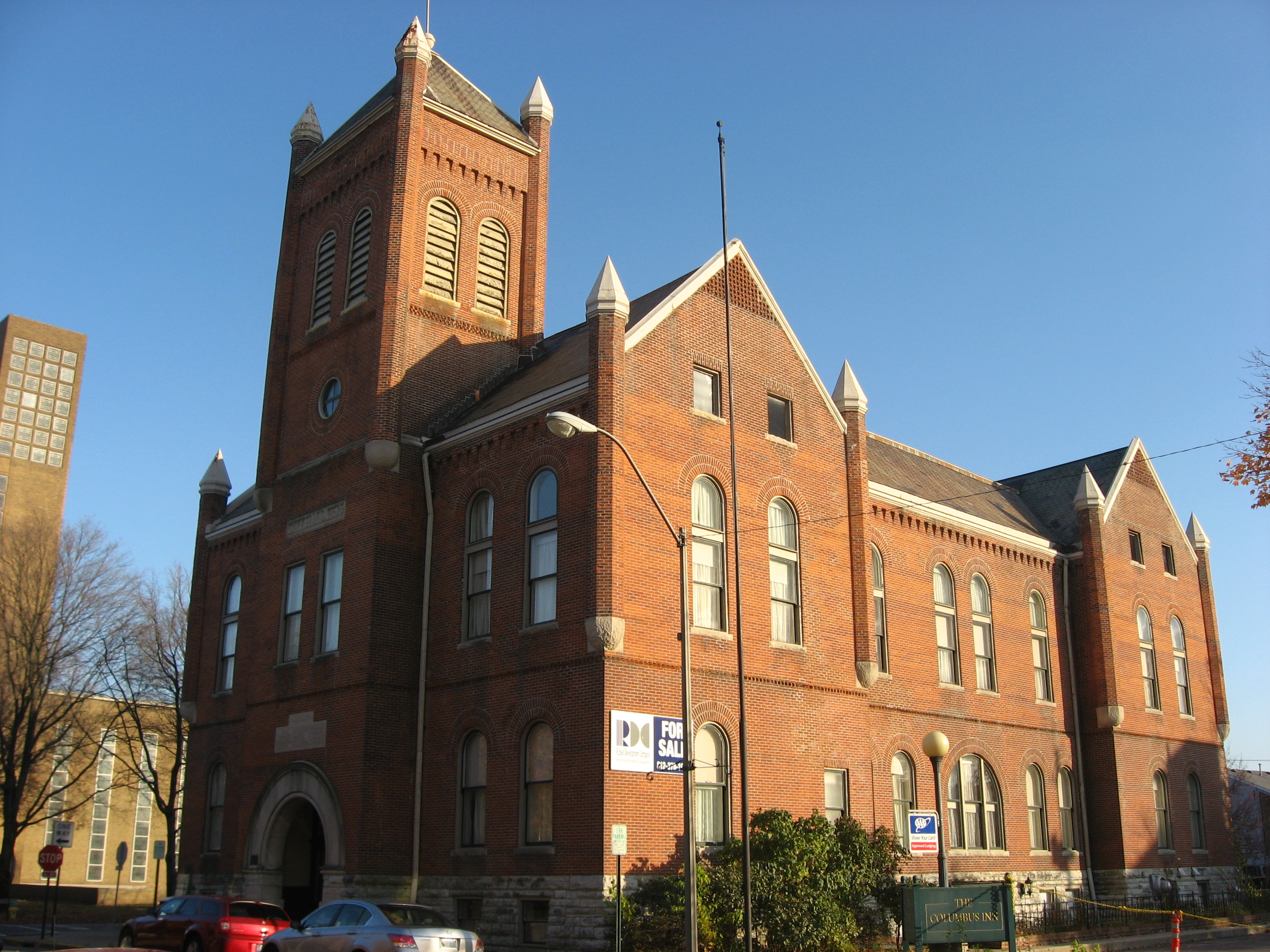
Old City Hall - 2009

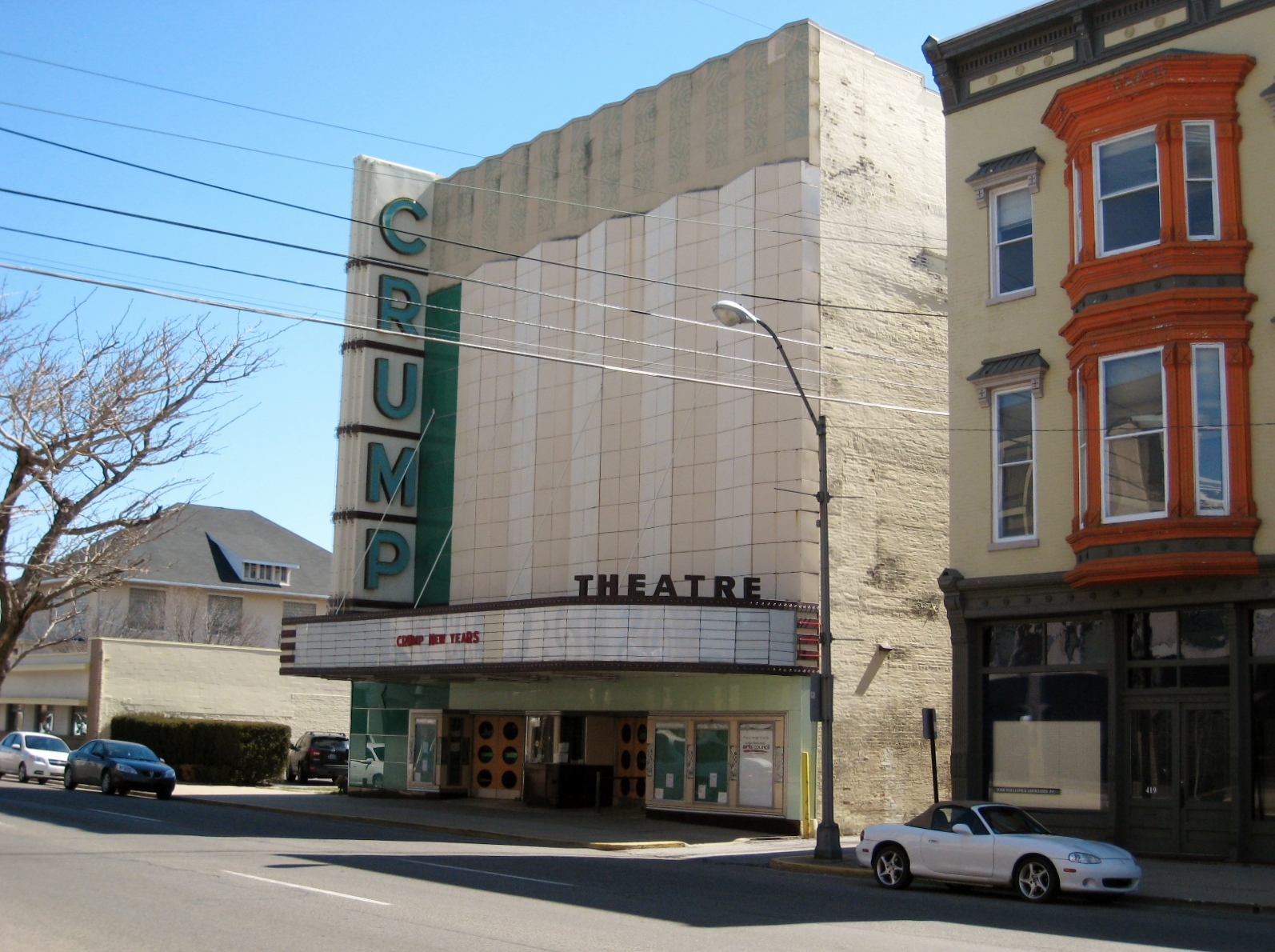
Crump Theatre - 2013

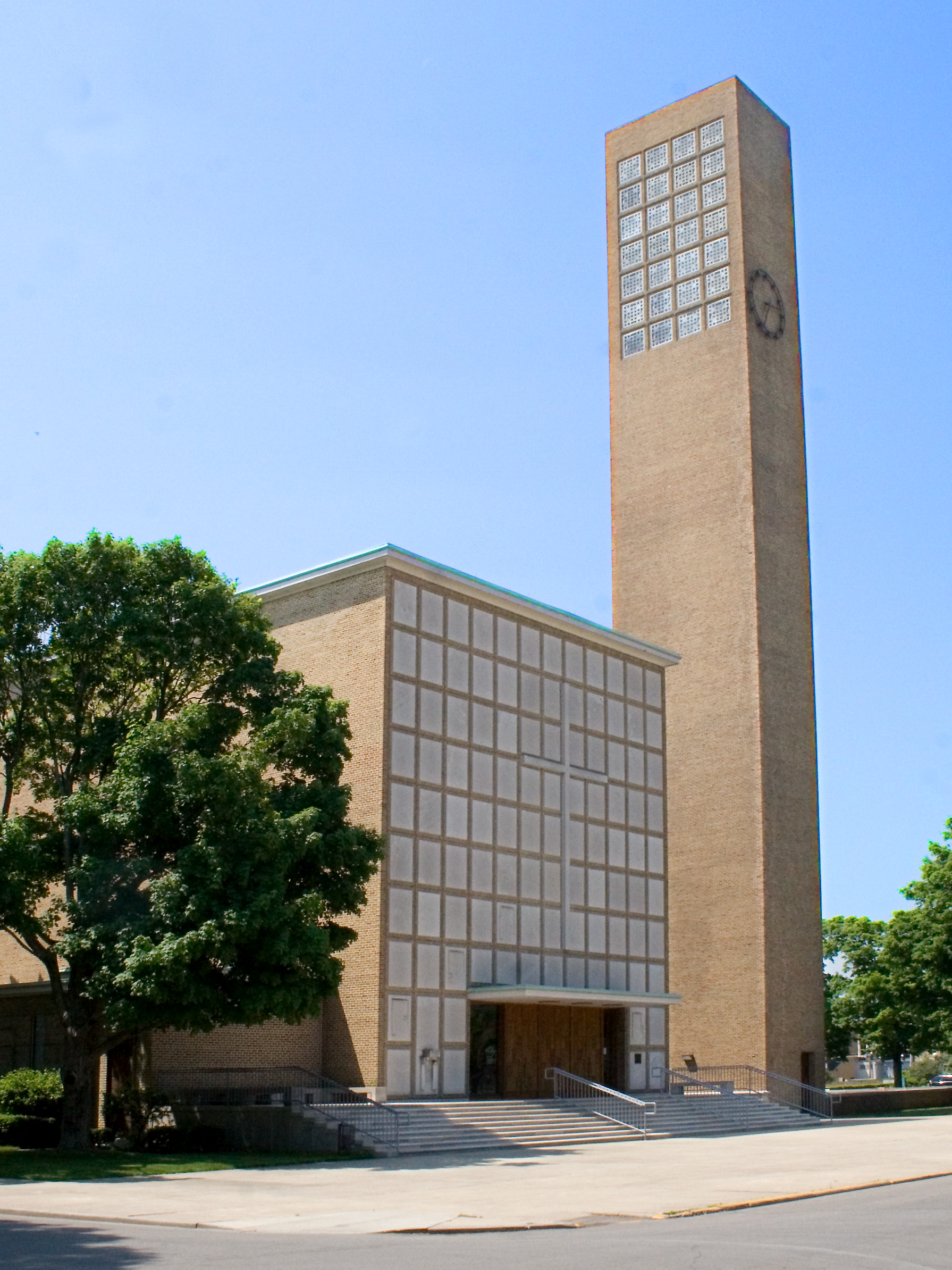
First Christian Church - 2007

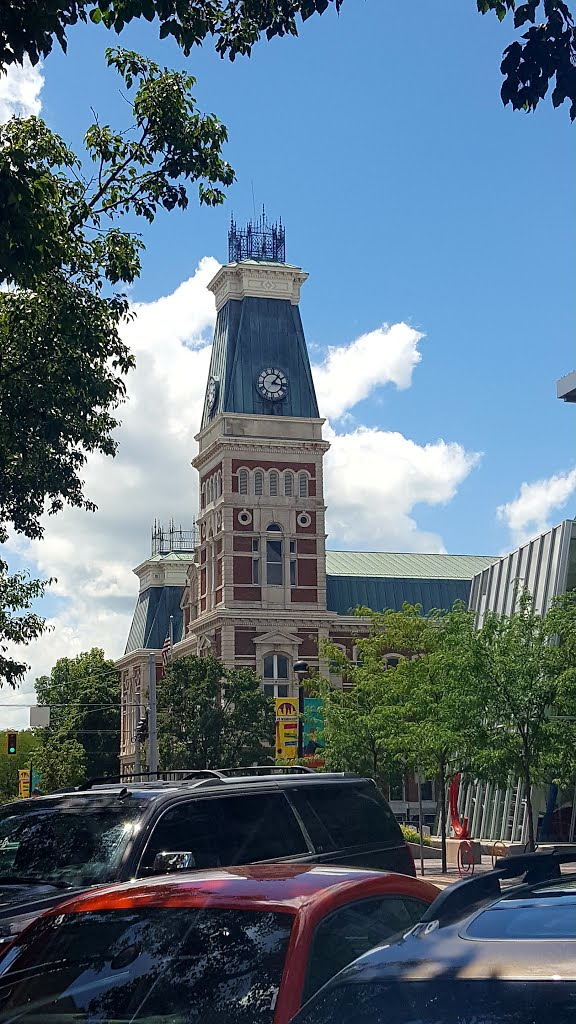
Bartholomew County Courthouse - 2016

== See also ==
- National Register of Historic Places listings in Bartholomew County, Indiana
