= Celina, Indiana =

- Unincorporated community
- Location within Indiana Location within the United States
- Coordinates: 38°11′17″N 86°36′46″W
- Country: United States
- State: Indiana
- County: Perry
- Township: Oil
- Elevation: 538 ft (164 m)
- Time zone: UTC-6 (Central (CST))
  - Summer (DST): UTC-5 (CDT)
- ZIP code: 47576
- Area codes: 812, 930
- GNIS feature ID: 450762

Celina is an unincorporated community in Oil Township, Perry County, in the U.S. state of Indiana.

== History ==
A post office was established at Celina in 1870, and remained in operation until 1940; for most of this period, the post office was located in the Jacob Rickenbaugh House. According to Ronald L. Baker, the community may be named after Celina, Ohio.

The first postmaster of the town was George Hilt, a blacksmith, who later handed the job to Ella Edwards in 1878, who served as postmistress for 50 years. She was succeeded by her daughter, who was reported to obtain the post in 1940. At its peak, the town had a blacksmith shop, a church, a store and a tannery
