= Oil Creek (Missouri) =

Stream in the US state of Missouri

Coordinates: 38°51′48″N 94°31′21″W

Oil Creek is a stream in Cass and Jackson Counties in the U.S. state of Missouri. It is a tributary of the Little Blue River.

Oil Creek was named for small-scale oil production along its course.

== See also ==
- List of rivers of Missouri
