= Oil Creek (Ohio River tributary) =

Stream in Perry County, Indiana, U.S.

Coordinates: 38°02′26″N 86°31′17″W

Oil Creek is a stream in Perry County, Indiana, in the United States. It is a tributary of the Ohio River.

Oil Creek was named for traces of oil along its banks.

== See also ==
- List of rivers of Indiana
