= National Register of Historic Places listings in Morgan County, Indiana =

Location of Morgan County in Indiana

This is a list of the National Register of Historic Places listings in Morgan County, Indiana.

This is intended to be a complete list of the properties and districts on the National Register of Historic Places in Morgan County, Indiana, United States. Latitude and longitude coordinates are provided for many National Register properties and districts; these locations may be seen together in a map.

There are 27 properties and districts listed on the National Register in the county. Another three properties were once listed but have been removed.

Properties and districts located in incorporated areas display the name of the municipality, while properties and districts in unincorporated areas display the name of their civil townships. Properties and districts split between multiple jurisdictions display the names of all jurisdictions.

This National Park Service list is complete through NPS recent listings posted May 1, 2026.

== Current listings ==
	Name on the Register	Image	Date listed	Location	City or town	Description
1	Blackstone House and Martinsville Telephone Company Building	Blackstone House and Martinsville Telephone Company Building	January 2, 1997 (#96001540)	127 S. Main St. 39°25′32″N 86°25′42″W	Martinsville	
2	Blankenship-Hodges-Brown House	Blankenship-Hodges-Brown House	September 15, 2005 (#05001012)	7455 W. Old State Road 67, southwest of Paragon; 39°23′38″N 86°33′59″W	Ray Township	
3	Bradford Estate	Bradford Estate	April 3, 1989 (#89000236)	5040 N. State Road 67, north of Martinsville; 39°29′56″N 86°25′30″W	Clay Township	
4	Cedar Point Farm	Cedar Point Farm	March 26, 2003 (#03000148)	8185 E. State Road 252, west of Morgantown; 39°22′14″N 86°16′47″W	Jackson Township	
5	Crawford-Gilpin House	Crawford-Gilpin House	June 24, 2008 (#08000558)	339 S. Ohio St. 39°25′26″N 86°25′24″W	Martinsville	
6	Cross School	Cross School	June 16, 1983 (#83000142)	Voiles and Townsend Rds., southeast of Martinsville; 39°23′27″N 86°22′53″W	Washington Township	
7	East Washington Street Historic District	East Washington Street Historic District	April 18, 1997 (#97000306)	Roughly E. Washington St. from Sycamore St. to Crawford St. 39°25′37″N 86°25′17″W	Martinsville	
8	Elm Spring Farm	Elm Spring Farm	September 16, 2001 (#01000981)	1 mile (1.6 km) north of Bain Rd. on Goose Creek Rd., northwest of Martinsville; 39°27′22″N 86°28′13″W	Jefferson Township	
9	Grassyfork Fisheries Farm No. 1	Grassyfork Fisheries Farm No. 1	July 10, 2012 (#12000189)	2902 E. Morgan St., northeast of Martinsville; 39°26′37″N 86°23′26″W	Washington Township	
10	Hall School	Hall School	September 29, 2004 (#04001100)	5955 W. Hurt Rd., southwest of Monrovia; 39°32′59″N 86°32′24″W	Gregg Township	
11	Lake Ditch Bridge	Lake Ditch Bridge	September 16, 2001 (#01000986)	Junction of Lake Ditch and Lake Ditch Rd., west of Monrovia; 39°34′35″N 86°31′35″W	Monroe Township	
12	Lamb's Creek Bridge	Lamb's Creek Bridge	December 28, 2000 (#00001541)	Junction of Lamb's Creek and W. Old State Road 67, west of Martinsville; 39°25′26″N 86°28′31″W	Jefferson Township	
13	Franklin Landers-Black and Adams Farm	Franklin Landers-Black and Adams Farm	September 22, 2000 (#00001142)	2430 S. Old State Road 67; 39°32′13″N 86°22′25″W	Brooklyn and Clay Township	
14	Long Schoolhouse	Long Schoolhouse	September 9, 1999 (#99001106)	0.5 miles (0.80 km) northwest of the junction of Jordan Rd. and Hinson Rd., south of Martinsville; 39°22′05″N 86°27′04″W	Washington Township	
15	Martinsville Commercial Historic District	Martinsville Commercial Historic District	April 1, 1998 (#98000300)	Roughly bounded by Pike, Mulberry, Jackson, and Sycamore Sts. 39°25′39″N 86°25′41″W	Martinsville	
16	Martinsville High School Gymnasium	Martinsville High School Gymnasium	July 30, 1981 (#81000004)	759 S. Main St. 39°25′09″N 86°25′40″W	Martinsville	
17	Martinsville Northside Historic District	Martinsville Northside Historic District	January 2, 1997 (#96001541)	Roughly bounded by Cunningham, Mulberry, Pike, and Graham Sts. 39°25′50″N 86°25′30″W	Martinsville	
18	Martinsville Sanitarium	Martinsville Sanitarium	December 6, 2005 (#05001368)	239 W. Harrison St. 39°25′46″N 86°25′54″W	Martinsville	
19	Martinsville Vandalia Depot	Martinsville Vandalia Depot	March 14, 1991 (#91000268)	210 N. Marion St. 39°25′45″N 86°25′52″W	Martinsville	
20	Mooresville Commercial Historic District	Mooresville Commercial Historic District	March 26, 2003 (#03000147)	Roughly one block north, south, east, and west of the corner of Main and Indiana; 39°36′46″N 86°22′32″W	Mooresville	
21	Mooresville Friends Academy Building	Mooresville Friends Academy Building	May 12, 1975 (#75000008)	244 N. Monroe St. 39°36′54″N 86°22′53″W	Mooresville	
22	Mooresville Gymnasium	Mooresville Gymnasium	June 20, 1997 (#97000598)	244 N. Monroe St. 39°36′56″N 86°22′53″W	Mooresville	
23	Morgan County Courthouse	Morgan County Courthouse	January 11, 1996 (#95001531)	Courthouse Square; 39°25′39″N 86°25′41″W	Martinsville	
24	Morgan County Sheriff's House and Jail	Morgan County Sheriff's House and Jail	May 30, 1996 (#96000602)	110 W. Washington St. 39°25′38″N 86°25′48″W	Martinsville	
25	Morgantown Historic District	Morgantown Historic District	June 21, 2006 (#06000519)	Approximately 4.5 blocks centered on Washington St., between Marion St. and east of Church St. 39°22′24″N 86°15′40″W	Morgantown	
26	Neely House	Neely House	March 15, 2000 (#00000203)	739 E. Washington St. 39°25′36″N 86°25′11″W	Martinsville	
27	Wilbur School	Wilbur School	May 27, 1993 (#93000473)	Wilbur Rd. at Wilbur; 39°30′49″N 86°29′16″W	Gregg Township	

== Former listings ==
	Name on the Register	Image	Date listed	Date removed	Location	City or town	Description
1	Burton Lane Bridge		April 14, 1997 (#97000302)	June 1, 2004	Burton Ln. over Indian Creek, 0.3 miles south of State Road 37	Martinsville	Destroyed by an overweight dump truck on May 16, 1997.
2	Hastings Schoolhouse		March 12, 1999 (#99000299)	June 1, 2004	0.2 miles south of the junction of Hacker Creek Rd. and Liberty Church Rd.	Martinsville	Destroyed by an F3 tornado on September 20, 2002.
3	Hite-Finney House	Hite-Finney House	January 11, 1996 (#95001532)	June 15, 2012	183 N. Jefferson St. 39°25′42″N 86°25′37″W	Martinsville	Building partially collapsed in 2003. Destroyed by fire in August 2006. Fully demolished in October 2009.

== See also ==
- List of National Historic Landmarks in Indiana
- National Register of Historic Places listings in Indiana
- Listings in neighboring counties: Brown, Hendricks, Johnson, Marion, Monroe, Owen, Putnam
- List of Indiana state historical markers in Morgan County
