= List of Indiana state historical markers in Morgan County =

Location of Morgan County in Indiana

This is a list of the Indiana state historical markers in Morgan County.

This is intended to be a detailed table of the official state historical marker placed in Morgan County, Indiana, United States by the Indiana Historical Bureau. The location of the historical marker and its latitude and longitude coordinates are included below when available, along with its name, year of placement, and topics as recorded by the Historical Bureau. There are 5 historical markers located in Morgan County.

== Historical markers ==
| Marker title | Image | Year placed | Location | Topics |
|---|---|---|---|---|
| Whetzel Trace | | 1957 | 8465 Old State Road 37, at the Whetzel Cemetery on the eastern side of the highway and south of the junction of Central Avenue and Waverly Road, near Waverly; 39°33′12″N 86°16′29″W | Transportation, Early Settlement and Exploration |
| Indiana State Flag | | 2016 | Intersection of E. Main Street and Indiana Street, Mooresville; 39°36′46″N 86°22′29″W | Arts and Culture, Government |
| Branch McCracken | | 2017 | 145 S. Chestnut St, Monrovia, outside the Monrovia Branch of the Morgan County Public Library; 39°34′35″N 86°28′47″W | Sports, Education, African American |
| Emmett Forest Branch | | 2018 | 510 E. Washington St., Martinsville; 39°25′37″N 86°25′20″W | Politics |
| Glenn Curtis 1894-1958 | | 2020 | 109 E Garfield Ave, Martinsville; 39°25′9.2″N 86°25′41.2″W | Sports |

== See also ==
- List of Indiana state historical markers
- National Register of Historic Places listings in Morgan County, Indiana
