= Lake Hart =

Lake Hart can refer to:

- Lake Hart, Florida, USA, a community
- Lake Hart, Indiana, USA, a community
- Lake Hart (South Australia), a lake within the Woomera Test Range
- Lake Hart (Winter Haven, Florida), a lake on the south side of Winter Haven, Florida
