= Browns Crossing, Indiana =

- Census-designated place
- Location within Indiana Location within the United States
- Coordinates: 39°24′26″N 86°29′54″W
- Country: United States
- State: Indiana
- County: Morgan
- Township: Jefferson

Area
  - Total: 0.45 sq mi (1.2 km^{2})
  - Land: 0.45 sq mi (1.2 km^{2})
  - Water: 0.0 sq mi (0 km^{2})
- Elevation: 591 ft (180 m)
- Time zone: UTC-5 (Eastern (EST))
  - Summer (DST): UTC-4 (EDT)
- ZIP code: 46151 (Martinsville)
- GNIS feature ID: 2830470
- FIPS code: 18-08434

Browns Crossing is an unincorporated community and census-designated place (CDP) in Jefferson Township, Morgan County, Indiana, United States. It was named a CDP after the 2020 census.

== Geography ==
Browns Crossing is in southwestern Morgan County, 4 miles (6 km) west of Martinsville, the county seat. It is on the south side of Indiana State Road 67, which leads northeast 17 miles (27 km) to Mooresville and southwest 19 miles (31 km) to Spencer. Downtown Indianapolis is 34 miles (55 km) to the northeast of Browns Crossing.

According to the U.S. Census Bureau, the CDP has a total area of 0.45 square miles (1.17 km^{2}), all land. The community lies on the north side of the valley of the White River.

== Demographics ==
The United States Census Bureau delineated Browns Crossing as a census designated place in the 2022 American Community Survey.
