= Ray Township, Indiana =

Ray Township, Indiana may refer to one of the following places:

- Ray Township, Franklin County, Indiana
- Ray Township, Morgan County, Indiana

== See also ==
- Ray Township (disambiguation)
