= Brooklyn, Indiana =

- Town
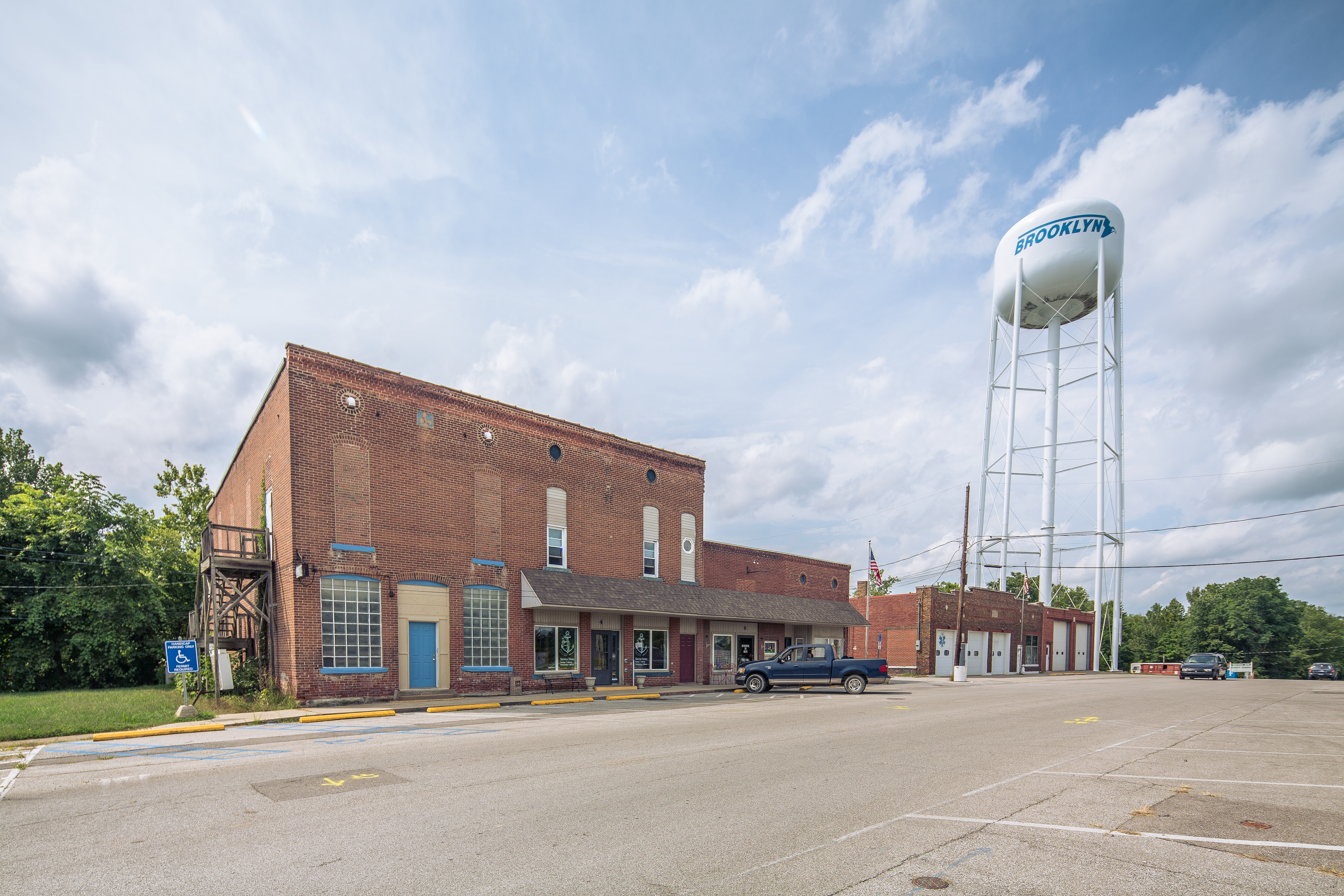

- Location in Morgan County, Indiana
- Coordinates: 39°32′52″N 86°22′26″W
- Country: United States
- State: Indiana
- County: Morgan
- Townships: Clay, Brown

Area
  - Total: 1.00 sq mi (2.60 km^{2})
  - Land: 0.99 sq mi (2.56 km^{2})
  - Water: 0.012 sq mi (0.03 km^{2})
- Elevation: 656 ft (200 m)

Population (2020)
  - Total: 2,511
  - Density: 2,537.3/sq mi (979.67/km^{2})
- Time zone: UTC-5 (Eastern (EST))
  - Summer (DST): UTC-5 (EST)
- ZIP codes: 46111 (Brooklyn); 46158 (Mooresville)
- Area code: 317, 463
- FIPS code: 18-08038
- GNIS: 2396605
- Website: townofbrooklyn.in.gov

Brooklyn is a town in Clay and Brown townships, Morgan County, Indiana, United States, just south of Mooresville, Indiana The population was 2,615 at the 2025 United States census, up from 1,598 in 2010.

== History ==
Brooklyn was laid out in 1854, at about the time the railroad was extended to that point. The town probably took its name after Brooklyn, New York. A post office has been in operation at Brooklyn since 1856.

This town also has rich history as part the Underground Railroad in Indiana mainly spanning from Bloomington to Indianapolis.

The Franklin Landers-Black and Adams Farm was listed on the National Register of Historic Places in 2000.

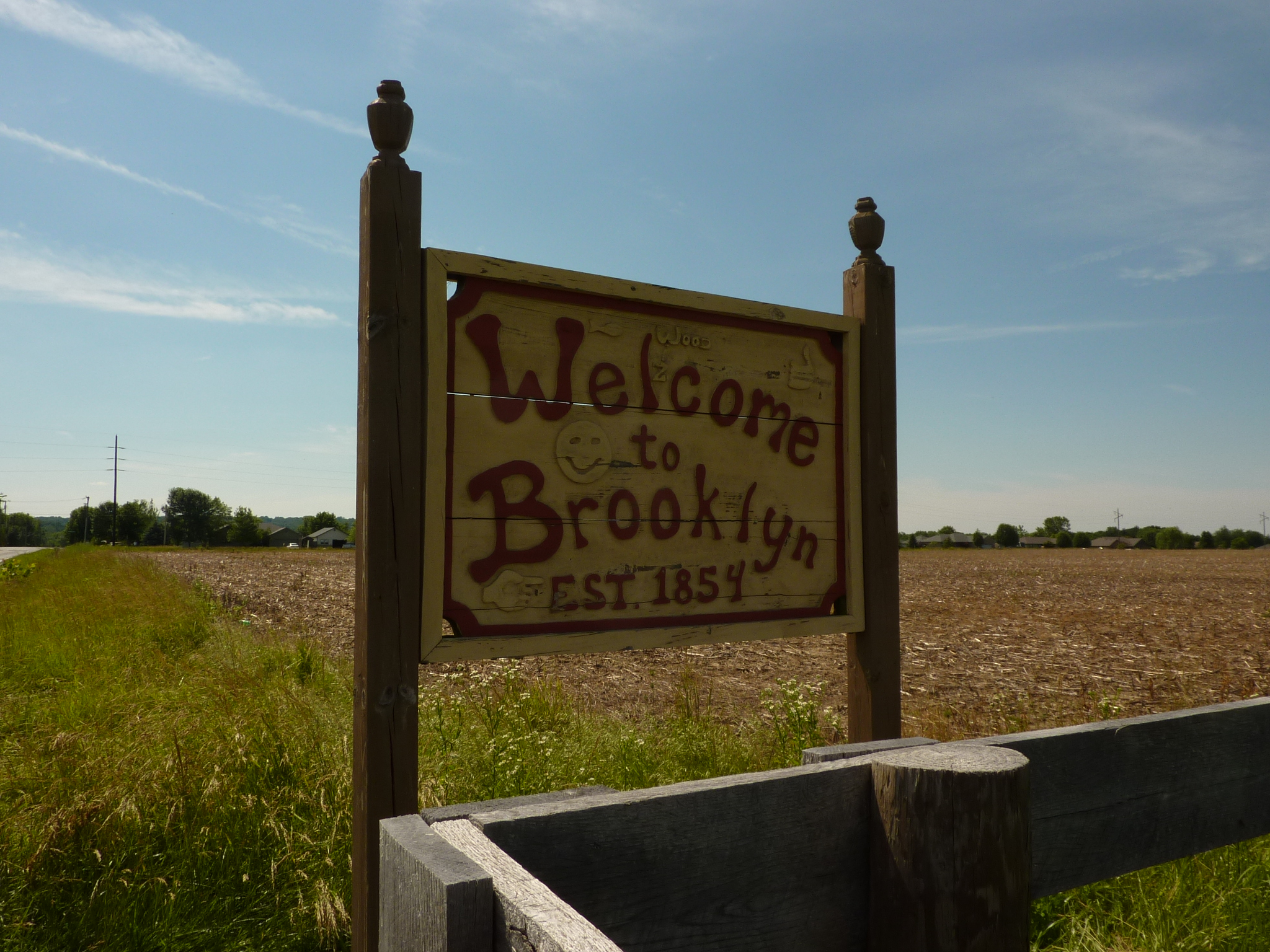
The town seen from the east

== Geography ==
Brooklyn is located in northeastern Morgan County and is bordered to the south by the town of Bethany. The town of Mooresville is 5 miles (8 km) to the north. Downtown Indianapolis is 21 miles (34 km) to the northeast.

According to the U.S. Census Bureau, Brooklyn has a total area of 1.00 square mile (2.59 km^{2}), of which 0.01 square miles (0.03 km^{2}), or 1.30%, are water. White Lick Creek passes through the east side of the town, flowing south to join the White River south of Centerton.

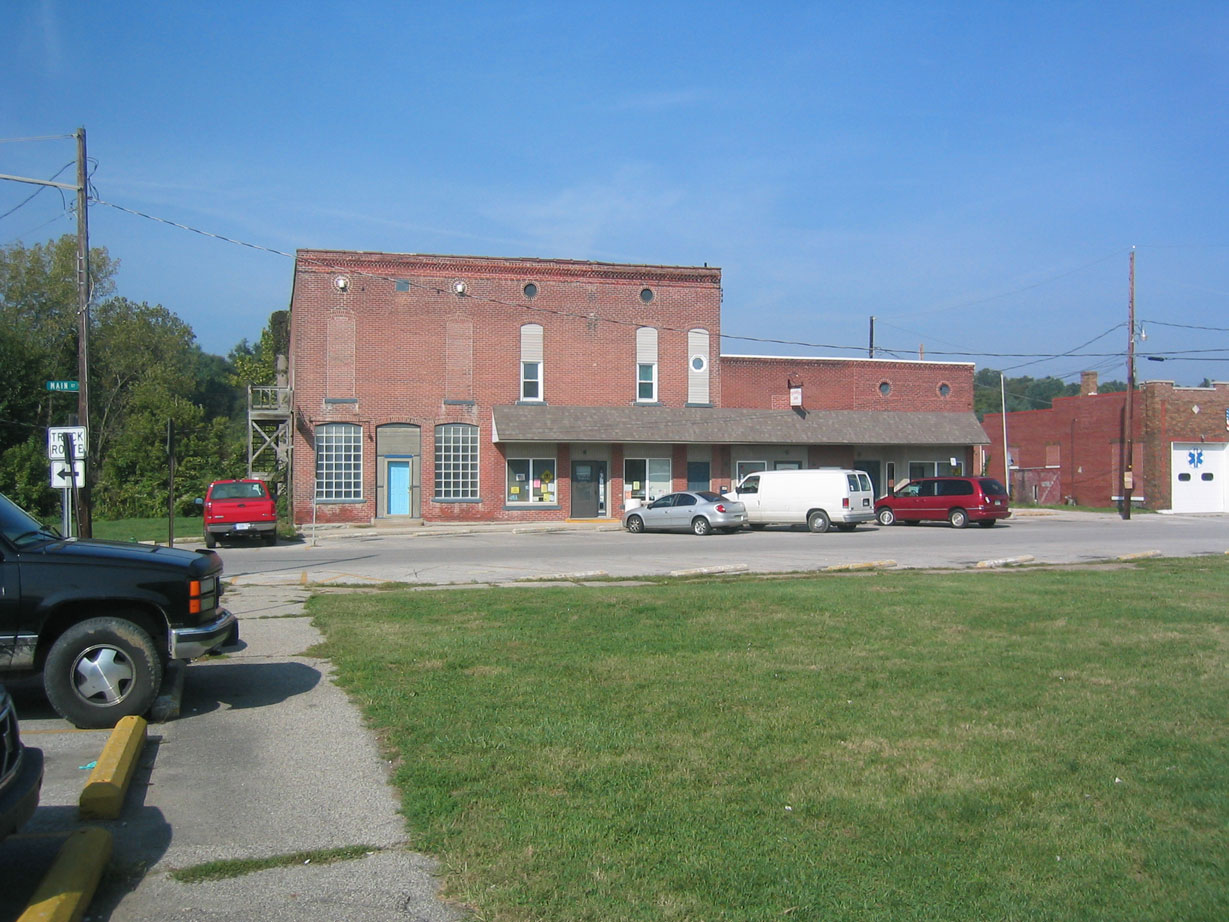
Downtown Brooklyn streetscape

== Demographics ==
Historical population
Census	Pop.	Note	%±
1880	244		—
1910	572		—
1920	528		−7.7%
1930	545		3.2%
1940	485		−11.0%
1950	592		22.1%
1960	866		46.3%
1970	911		5.2%
1980	888		−2.5%
1990	1,162		30.9%
2000	1,545		33.0%
2010	1,598		3.4%
2020	2,511		57.1%
U.S. Decennial Census

=== 2020 census ===
As of the 2020 census, Brooklyn had a population of 2,511. The median age was 36.0 years. 26.6% of residents were under the age of 18 and 12.6% of residents were 65 years of age or older. For every 100 females there were 99.4 males, and for every 100 females age 18 and over there were 95.5 males age 18 and over.

100.0% of residents lived in urban areas, while 0.0% lived in rural areas.

There were 942 households in Brooklyn, of which 36.3% had children under the age of 18 living in them. Of all households, 47.5% were married-couple households, 19.6% were households with a male householder and no spouse or partner present, and 22.0% were households with a female householder and no spouse or partner present. About 22.0% of all households were made up of individuals and 8.8% had someone living alone who was 65 years of age or older.

There were 998 housing units, of which 5.6% were vacant. The homeowner vacancy rate was 1.7% and the rental vacancy rate was 5.9%.

Racial composition as of the 2020 census
Race	Number	Percent
White	2,334	93.0%
Black or African American	15	0.6%
American Indian and Alaska Native	14	0.6%
Asian	5	0.2%
Native Hawaiian and Other Pacific Islander	0	0.0%
Some other race	14	0.6%
Two or more races	129	5.1%
Hispanic or Latino (of any race)	45	1.8%

=== 2010 census ===
As of the 2010 census, there were 1,598 people, 580 households, and 455 families living in the town. The population density was 2,385.1 inhabitants per square mile (920.9/km^{2}). There were 630 housing units at an average density of 940.3 per square mile (363.1/km^{2}). The racial makeup of the town was 82.4% White, 10.4%African American, 0.4 Native American, 0.2% Asian, 0.7% from other races, and 7.6% from two or more races. Hispanic or Latino of any race were 1.8% of the population.

There were 580 households, of which 40.3% had children under the age of 18 living with them, 58.4% were married couples living together, 15.2% had a female householder with no husband present, 4.8% had a male householder with no wife present, and 21.6% were non-families. 16.9% of all households were made up of individuals, and 5.5% had someone living alone who was 65 years of age or older. The average household size was 2.76 and the average family size was 3.05.

The median age in the town was 34.7 years. 28.1% of residents were under the age of 18; 8.5% were between the ages of 18 and 24; 26.5% were from 25 to 44; 25.8% were from 45 to 64; and 11% were 65 years of age or older. The gender makeup of the town was 50.4% male and 49.6% female.

=== 2000 census ===
As of the 2000 census, there were 1,545 people, 553 households, and 435 families living in the town. The population density was 1,988.5 inhabitants per square mile (767.8/km^{2}). There were 577 housing units at an average density of 742.6 per square mile (286.7/km^{2}). The racial makeup of the town was 87.70% White, 9% Black, 0.39% Native American, 0.06% Asian, 0.06% from other races, and 2.78% from two or more races. Hispanic or Latino of any race were 1.04% of the population.

There were 553 households, out of which 40.7% had children under the age of 18 living with them, 62.9% were married couples living together, 11.0% had a female householder with no husband present, and 21.3% were non-families. 17.5% of all households were made up of individuals, and 6.5% had someone living alone who was 65 years of age or older. The average household size was 2.79 and the average family size was 3.11.

In the town, the population was spread out, with 30.3% under the age of 18, 8.2% from 18 to 24, 35.8% from 25 to 44, 18.7% from 45 to 64, and 7.1% who were 65 years of age or older. The median age was 32 years. For every 100 females, there were 107.4 males. For every 100 females age 18 and over, there were 103.6 males.

The median income for a household in the town was $42,880, and the median income for a family was $44,563. Males had a median income of $35,292 versus $25,303 for females. The per capita income for the town was $18,242. About 8.2% of families and 9.5% of the population were below the poverty line, including 14.2% of those under age 18 and 10.7% of those age 65 or over.

== Education ==
Grade school students attend Brooklyn Elementary STEM Academy, a part of the MSD of Martinsville. Students from Brooklyn attend Bell Intermediate Academy, John R. Wooden Middle School and Martinsville High School in Martinsville, Indiana

Brooklyn has a public library, a branch of the Morgan County Public Library.

== Arts and culture ==
The Goethe Link Observatory is a mile or two west of town on Observatory Road. The observatory grounds are noted for the large collection of daffodils assembled by Dr. Link's wife. Brooklyn was also home to the artist/painter Indiana Gyberson.
