= Gasburg, Indiana =

- Unincorporated community
- Location within Indiana Location within the United States
- Coordinates: 39°35′40″N 86°26′13″W
- Country: United States
- State: Indiana
- County: Morgan
- Township: Monroe
- Elevation: 846 ft (258 m)
- Time zone: UTC-5 (Eastern (EST))
  - Summer (DST): UTC-4 (EDT)
- ZIP code: 46158
- FIPS code: 18-27036
- GNIS feature ID: 447645

Gasburg is an unincorporated community in Monroe Township, Morgan County, in the U.S. state of Indiana.

== History ==
A post office was established at Gasburg in 1874, and remained in operation until it was discontinued in 1904.

== Geography ==
Gasburg is located on Indiana State Road 42 between Monrovia and Mooresville.
