= Green Township, Morgan County, Indiana =

Green Township
- Township
- Location in Morgan County
- Coordinates: 39°28′25″N 86°18′20″W
- Country: United States
- State: Indiana
- County: Morgan

Government
  - Type: Indiana township

Area
  - Total: 33.47 sq mi (86.7 km^{2})
  - Land: 33.15 sq mi (85.9 km^{2})
  - Water: 0.32 sq mi (0.83 km^{2}) 0.96%
- Elevation: 702 ft (214 m)

Population (2020)
  - Total: 3,604
  - Density: 106.2/sq mi (41.0/km^{2})
- Time zone: UTC-5 (Eastern (EST))
  - Summer (DST): UTC-4 (EDT)
- ZIP code: 46151
- GNIS feature ID: 453344

Green Township is one of fourteen townships in Morgan County, Indiana, United States. As of the 2010 census, its population was 3,520 and it contained 1,317 housing units.

== Geography ==
According to the 2010 census, the township has a total area of 33.47 square miles (86.7 km^{2}), of which 33.15 square miles (85.9 km^{2}) (or 99.04%) is land and 0.32 square miles (0.83 km^{2}) (or 0.96%) is water.

=== Unincorporated towns ===
- Adams at 39.482270°N 86.355548°W
- Chetwynd at 39.443104°N 86.269435°W
- Cope at 39.450326°N 86.318881°W
- Exchange at 39.501715°N 86.322214°W

(This list is based on USGS data and may include former settlements.)

=== Cemeteries ===
The township contains these six cemeteries: Brian, Centennial Church, Flake, Scroggins, Thompson and Williams.

=== Major highways ===
- Indiana State Road 37
- Indiana State Road 44

=== Airports and landing strips ===
- Jungclause Airport

== School districts ==
- Metropolitan School District of Martinsville

== Political districts ==
- Indiana's 4th congressional district
- State House District 47
- State Senate District 37
