= Baker Township, Morgan County, Indiana =

Baker Township
- Township
- Location in Morgan County
- Coordinates: 39°21′22″N 86°32′51″W
- Country: United States
- State: Indiana
- County: Morgan

Government
  - Type: Indiana township

Area
  - Total: 15.66 sq mi (40.6 km^{2})
  - Land: 15.41 sq mi (39.9 km^{2})
  - Water: 0.24 sq mi (0.62 km^{2}) 1.53%
- Elevation: 702 ft (214 m)

Population (2020)
  - Total: 726
  - Density: 46.5/sq mi (18.0/km^{2})
- Time zone: UTC-5 (Eastern (EST))
  - Summer (DST): UTC-4 (EDT)
- ZIP codes: 46151, 47433
- GNIS feature ID: 453094

Baker Township is one of fourteen townships in Morgan County, Indiana, United States. As of the 2010 census, its population was 717 and it contained 274 housing units. The township contains Morgan–Monroe State Forest.

== Geography ==
According to the 2010 census, the township has a total area of 15.66 square miles (40.6 km^{2}), of which 15.41 square miles (39.9 km^{2}) (or 98.40%) is land and 0.24 square miles (0.62 km^{2}) (or 1.53%) is water.

=== Unincorporated towns ===
- Turkey Track at 39.354491°N 86.49833°W

(This list is based on USGS data and may include former settlements.)

=== Cemeteries ===
The township contains Sodom Cemetery.

=== Major highways ===
- Indiana State Road 37

== School districts ==
- Metropolitan School District of Martinsville

== Political districts ==
- Indiana's 4th congressional district
- State House District 47
- State Senate District 37
