= Hyndsdale, Indiana =

- Unincorporated community
- Location within Indiana Location within the United States
- Coordinates: 39°24′57″N 86°29′05″W
- Country: United States
- State: Indiana
- County: Morgan
- Township: Jefferson
- Elevation: 600 ft (180 m)
- Time zone: UTC-5 (Eastern (EST))
  - Summer (DST): UTC-4 (EDT)
- ZIP code: 46151
- FIPS code: 18-35505
- GNIS feature ID: 436675

Hyndsdale is an unincorporated community in Jefferson Township, Morgan County, in the U.S. state of Indiana.

== History ==
Hyndsdale had its start by the building of the railroad through that territory. The community was named after a local family of settlers.

A post office was established at Hyndsdale in 1869, and remained in operation until it was discontinued in 1904.
