= Miller, Indiana =

- Unincorporated community
- Location within Indiana Location within the United States
- Coordinates: 39°37′14″N 86°16′55″W
- Country: United States
- State: Indiana
- County: Morgan
- Township: Madison
- Elevation: 732 ft (223 m)
- Time zone: UTC-5 (Eastern (EST))
  - Summer (DST): UTC-4 (EDT)
- ZIP code: 46113
- FIPS code: 18-49490
- GNIS feature ID: 439176

Miller is an unincorporated community in Madison Township, Morgan County, in the U.S. state of Indiana.
