= Indiana Gyberson =

American painter

Indiana Gyberson (sometimes Gyborson or Giberson) (1879–1944) was an American painter, born Anna Giberson before adopting her mother's first name and changing the spelling of her surname. Well-regarded in her day, she has been almost completely forgotten.

Gyberson appears to have been born in the town of Brooklyn, Indiana and was a student of William Merritt Chase at the Shinnecock School of Art. She lived in Paris in 1912; there she suffered a severe eye injury and was forced to change her manner of painting. She is known to have been living in New York City in 1904, the year in which she first showed work at the Art Institute of Chicago. She had moved to Chicago by 1918, taking space in the Tree Studio Building and showing work at the Institute. Most of her paintings were of exotic, semi-nude women, but she also produced portraits, still lifes, and landscapes. She was active throughout the 1920s; her work is found in exhibition catalogs from the Art Institute in 1920 and 1924, and in 1922 she completed a landscape mural for the home of Julius Rosenwald. She is said to have gone to New York in that year, but she retained her Chicago address, and she won prizes from the Chicago Galleries Association in 1926 and 1928; in 1925 and 1926 she showed work at the Pennsylvania Academy of the Fine Arts. Gyberson last exhibited work in Chicago in 1928, and that is the year most commonly given for her death. Artist Anna Lynch reported in 1944 that she was dead, and had been living in the eastern United States for some years before then, but gave no other information.
