= Cope, Indiana =

- Unincorporated community
- Location within Indiana Location within the United States
- Coordinates: 39°27′01″N 86°19′08″W
- Country: United States
- State: Indiana
- County: Morgan
- Township: Green
- Elevation: 741 ft (226 m)
- Time zone: UTC-5 (Eastern (EST))
  - Summer (DST): UTC-4 (EDT)
- ZIP code: 46151
- FIPS code: 18-15070
- GNIS feature ID: 432951

Cope is an unincorporated community in Green Township, Morgan County, in the U.S. state of Indiana.

== History ==
A post office was established at Cope in 1879, and remained in operation until it was discontinued in 1904.
