= Center Valley, Morgan County, Indiana =

Center Valley
- Unincorporated community
- Location within Indiana Location within the United States
- Coordinates: 39°30′49″N 86°24′32″W
- Country: United States
- State: Indiana
- County: Morgan
- Township: Clay
- Elevation: 620 ft (190 m)
- Time zone: UTC-5 (Eastern (EST))
  - Summer (DST): UTC-4 (EDT)
- ZIP code: 46151
- GNIS feature ID: 432343

Center Valley is an unincorporated community in Clay Township, Morgan County, in the U.S. state of Indiana.

== History ==
A post office was established at Center Valley in 1856, and remained in operation until it was discontinued in 1872.
