= John Van Lindley =

American pomologist (1838–1918)

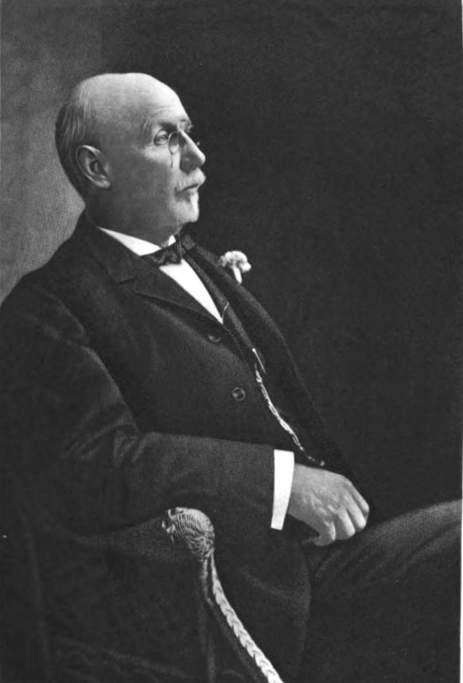
- Born: John Van Mons Lindley; November 5, 1838; Monrovia, Indiana
- Died: June 13, 1918 (aged 79); Pomona, North Carolina
- Occupations: Pomologist, nurseryman

John Van Mons Lindley (November 5, 1838 – June 13, 1918), pomologist and early nurseryman, was born in Monrovia, Indiana. He was also known as John Van Lindley, but as an adult preferred the name J. Van Lindley. He was the second son of Joshua Lindley, one of the earliest pomologists in both Indiana and North Carolina and a prominent Quaker. He was the great-great-grandson of Thomas Lindley Sr., on whose land the Battle of Lindley's Mill was fought.

J. Van Lindley's family moved to North Carolina when he was three years old. J. Van grew up first in Chatham County (now Alamance County) and then Guilford County. In Guilford County he was part of the Quaker New Garden Monthly Meeting. His strong Quaker upbringing led him to take up the Union cause and he served three years during the civil war with the 4th Regiment of the Missouri State Militia (Union) Cavalry. Following the war, he returned to Greensboro, NC where he restarted his father's nursery business, paid off the $5,000 (~$151,172 in 2025) of debt accumulated during the war, and then started Pomona Hills Nursery about 1877.

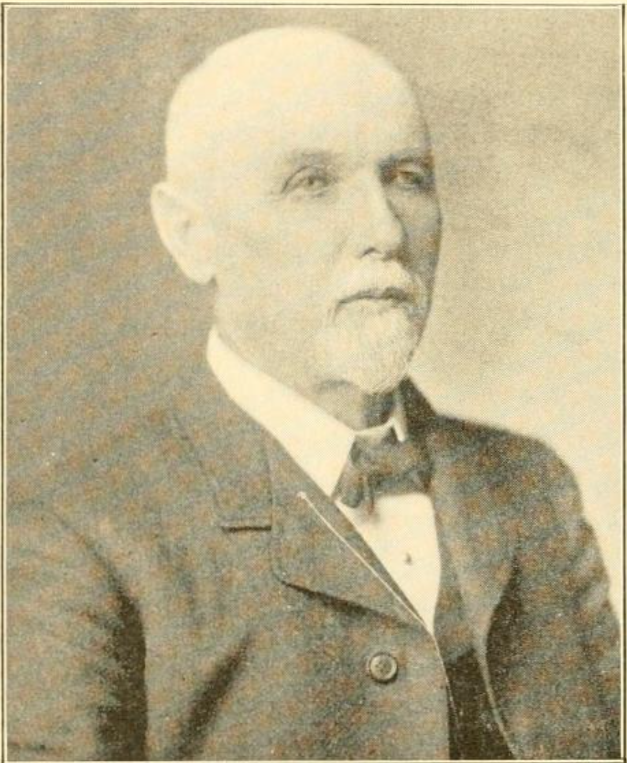
Van Lindley, c. 1903

J. Van built his nursery business deliberately until he owned over 900 acres in the town of Pomona, on the west side of Greensboro. Not satisfied with the 22,000 customers he had by the early 1900s when he re-incorporated as J. Van Lindley Nurseries, he also branched out into other businesses. He started Pomona Terra Cotta with Angus Smith in 1886. In 1892 he started the J. Van Lindley Orchard Company, bought 1,000 acres of land west of Southern Pines and planted 60,000 peach trees; starting the large-scale peach industry in Moore County. He donated 60 acres for a recreation complex including a man-made lake, named Lindley Park, in Greensboro, NC in 1902. He started several insurance and banking companies in Guilford County and Forsyth County, including the Security Life and Annuity Company of Greensboro, which merged in 1912 with Jefferson Standard Life Insurance Company, later becoming Jefferson-Pilot Life Insurance Company. He also owned 1,000 acres in Harnett County which were sold in the 1930s to Isabel Rockefeller and are now part of Fort Bragg.

He died at his home in Pomona on June 13, 1918.
