= Landersdale, Indiana =

- Unincorporated community
- Location within Indiana Location within the United States
- Coordinates: 39°37′10″N 86°15′47″W
- Country: United States
- State: Indiana
- County: Morgan
- Township: Madison
- Elevation: 669 ft (204 m)
- Time zone: UTC-5 (Eastern (EST))
  - Summer (DST): UTC-4 (EDT)
- ZIP code: 46158
- GNIS feature ID: 437600

Landersdale is an unincorporated community in Madison Township, Morgan County, in the U.S. state of Indiana.

== History ==
A post office was established at Landersdale in 1870, and remained in operation until it was discontinued in 1906.
