= Whitaker, Indiana =

- Unincorporated community
- Location within Indiana Location within the United States
- Coordinates: 39°22′47″N 86°36′27″W
- Country: United States
- State: Indiana
- County: Morgan
- Township: Ray
- Elevation: 574 ft (175 m)
- Time zone: UTC-5 (Eastern (EST))
  - Summer (DST): UTC-4 (EDT)
- ZIP code: 46166
- FIPS code: 18-83708
- GNIS feature ID: 445913

Whitaker is an unincorporated community in Ray Township, Morgan County, in the U.S. state of Indiana.

== History ==
A post office was established at Whitaker in 1883, and remained in operation until it was discontinued in 1937.
