= Five Points, Morgan County, Indiana =

Five Points
- Unincorporated community
- Location within Indiana Location within the United States
- Coordinates: 39°34′53″N 86°19′01″W
- Country: United States
- State: Indiana
- County: Morgan
- Township: Madison
- Elevation: 781 ft (238 m)
- Time zone: UTC-5 (Eastern (EST))
  - Summer (DST): UTC-4 (EDT)
- ZIP code: 46158
- GNIS feature ID: 434550

Five Points is an unincorporated community in Madison Township, Morgan County, in the U.S. state of Indiana.

== History ==
Five Points is so named due to the fact that five different roads meet at one single point.
