= Martinsville Northside Historic District =

Historic district in Indiana, United States

- U.S. National Register of Historic Places
- U.S. Historic district
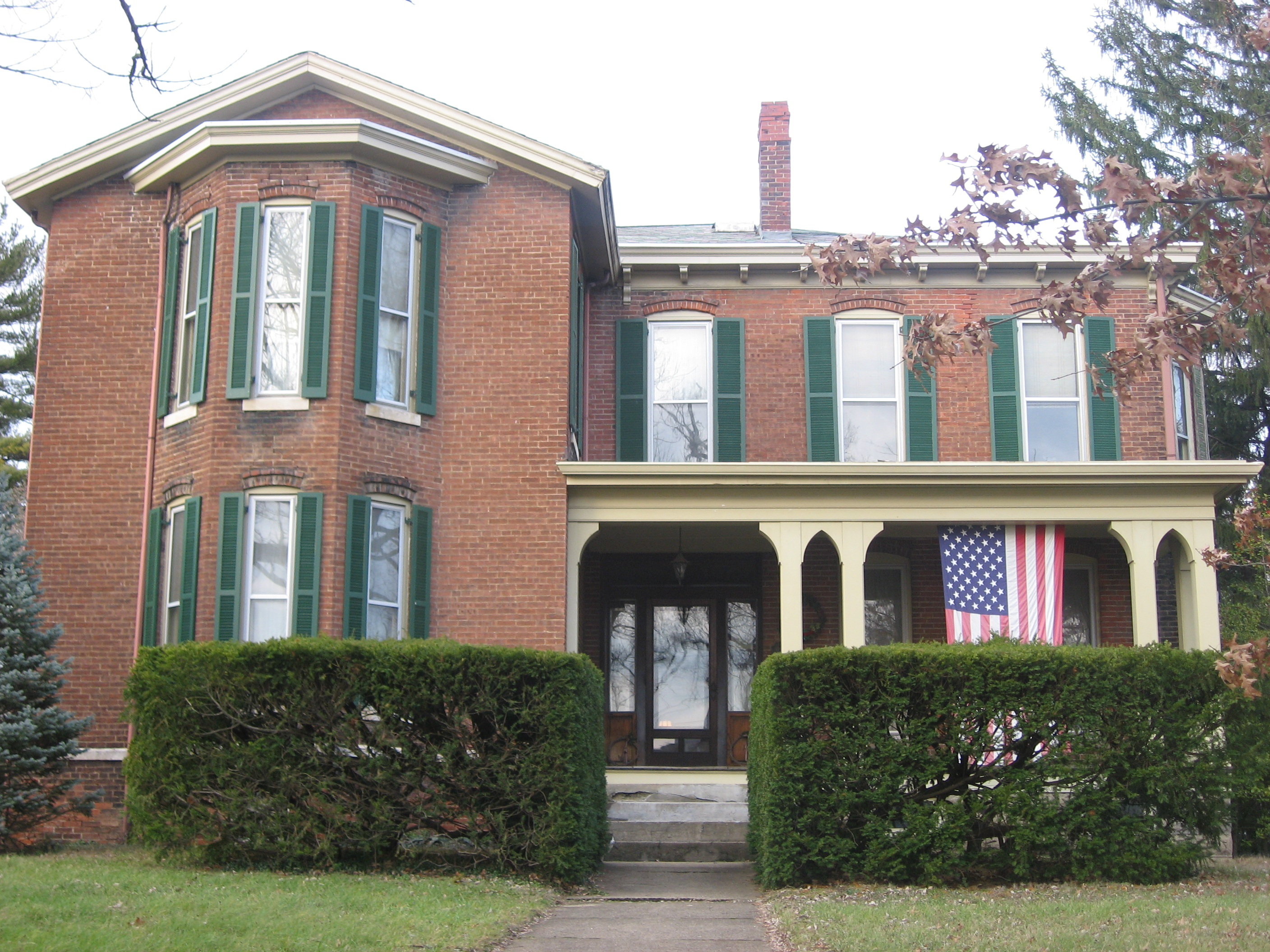
- House at 90 E. Harrison in Martinsville, December 2011

- Location within Indiana Location within the United States
- Location: Roughly bounded Cunningham, Mulberry, Pike, and Graham Sts., Martinsville, Indiana
- Coordinates: 39°25′50″N 86°25′30″W
- Area: 41 acres (17 ha)
- Architect: Roberts, Charles
- Architectural style: Queen Anne, Bungalow/craftsman, gable front
- NRHP reference No.: 96001541
- Added to NRHP: January 2, 1997

Martinsville Northside Historic District is a national historic district located at Martinsville, Indiana. The district encompasses 96 contributing buildings and 11 contributing structures in a predominantly residential section of Martinsville. It developed between about 1850 and 1935, and includes notable examples of Queen Anne and Bungalow/American Craftsman style architecture. Notable buildings include the Brown-Haworth House (c. 1923), William R. Harrison House / Bates House (c. 1860), St. Martin of Tours Roman Catholic Church (1889), Elliott House (1865), Kriner House (c. 1930), and Schofield-Maxwell House (c. 1875). The formerly listed Hite-Finney House was located in the district.

It was listed on the National Register of Historic Places in 1997.
