= Bethany, Indiana =

- Town
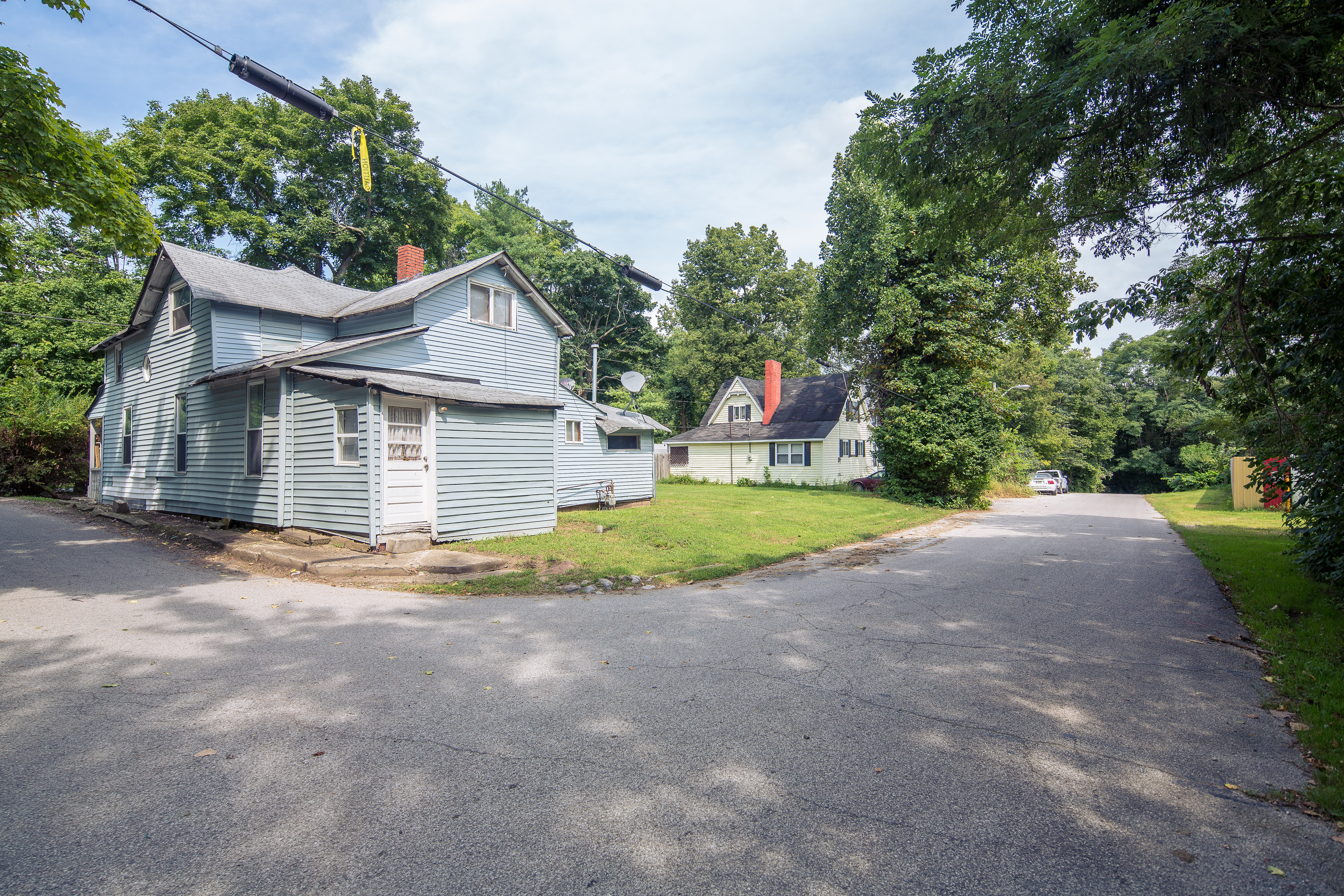

- Seal

- Location in Morgan County, Indiana
- Coordinates: 39°32′02″N 86°22′32″W
- Country: United States
- State: Indiana
- County: Morgan
- Township: Clay
- Established: 1955

Area
  - Total: 0.097 sq mi (0.25 km^{2})
  - Land: 0.097 sq mi (0.25 km^{2})
  - Water: 0 sq mi (0.00 km^{2})
- Elevation: 689 ft (210 m)

Population (2020)
  - Total: 95
  - Density: 1,004.1/sq mi (387.69/km^{2})
- Time zone: UTC-5 (Eastern (EST))
  - Summer (DST): UTC-5 (EST)
- ZIP code: 46151
- Area codes: 317, 463
- FIPS code: 18-04978
- GNIS feature ID: 2396589
- Website: townofbethanyin.wordpress.com

Bethany is a town in Clay Township, Morgan County, in the U.S. state of Indiana. The population was 95 at the 2020 census.

== History ==
Bethany was incorporated in 1955, named for Bethany Park, established on the site in 1884 by the Disciples of Christ for camp meetings.

== Geography ==
Bethany is in northeastern Morgan County and is bordered to the northeast by the town of Brooklyn. Indiana State Road 67 passes 0.5 miles (0.8 km) to the west of the town, leading north 5 miles (8 km) to Mooresville and south 11 miles (18 km) to Martinsville, the county seat. Downtown Indianapolis is 22 miles (35 km) to the northeast via SR 67.

According to the U.S. Census Bureau, Bethany has a total area of 0.095 square miles (0.246 km^{2}), all land. The town sits just to the northwest of the White River.

== Demographics ==
Historical population
Census	Pop.	Note	%±
1880	62		—
1960	119		—
1970	121		1.7%
1980	127		5.0%
1990	90		−29.1%
2000	94		4.4%
2010	81		−13.8%
2020	95		17.3%
U.S. Decennial Census

=== 2010 census ===
As of the census of 2010, there were 81 people, 31 households, and 24 families living in the town. The population density was 1,012.5 inhabitants per square mile (390.9/km^{2}). There were 34 housing units at an average density of 425.0 per square mile (164.1/km^{2}). The racial makeup of the town was 90.1% White,5%~ Black, 1.2% Native American, and 3.7% from two or more races. Hispanic or Latino of any race were 1.2% of the population.

There were 31 households, of which 32.3% had children under the age of 18 living with them, 45.2% were married couples living together, 16.1% had a female householder with no husband present, 16.1% had a male householder with no wife present, and 22.6% were non-families. 19.4% of all households were made up of individuals, and 9.7% had someone living alone who was 65 years of age or older. The average household size was 2.61 and the average family size was 2.92.

The median age in the town was 35.8 years. 19.8% of residents were under the age of 18; 12.3% were between the ages of 18 and 24; 29.6% were from 25 to 44; 27.1% were from 45 to 64; and 11.1% were 65 years of age or older. The gender makeup of the town was 53.1% male and 46.9% female.

=== 2000 census ===
As of the census of 2000, there were 94 people, 30 households, and 24 families living in the town. The population density was 1,133.6 inhabitants per square mile (437.7/km^{2}). There were 34 housing units at an average density of 410.0 per square mile (158.3/km^{2}). The racial makeup of the town was 98.94% White, and 1.06% from two or more races.

There were 30 households, out of which 50.0% had children under the age of 18 living with them, 70.0% were married couples living together, and 20.0% were non-families. 13.3% of all households were made up of individuals, and 6.7% had someone living alone who was 65 years of age or older. The average household size was 3.13 and the average family size was 3.46.

In the town, the population was spread out, with 33.0% under the age of 18, 10.6% from 18 to 24, 30.9% from 25 to 44, 18.1% from 45 to 64, and 7.4% who were 65 years of age or older. The median age was 37 years. For every 100 females, there were 123.8 males. For every 100 females age 18 and over, there were 110.0 males.

The median income for a household in the town was $22,344, and the median income for a family was $56,250. Males had a median income of $25,000 versus $12,500 for females. The per capita income for the town was $16,967. There were 15.6% of the population living below the poverty line, including no under eighteens and 100.0% of those over 64.
