= Blankenship-Hodges-Brown House =

Historic house in Indiana, United States

- U.S. National Register of Historic Places
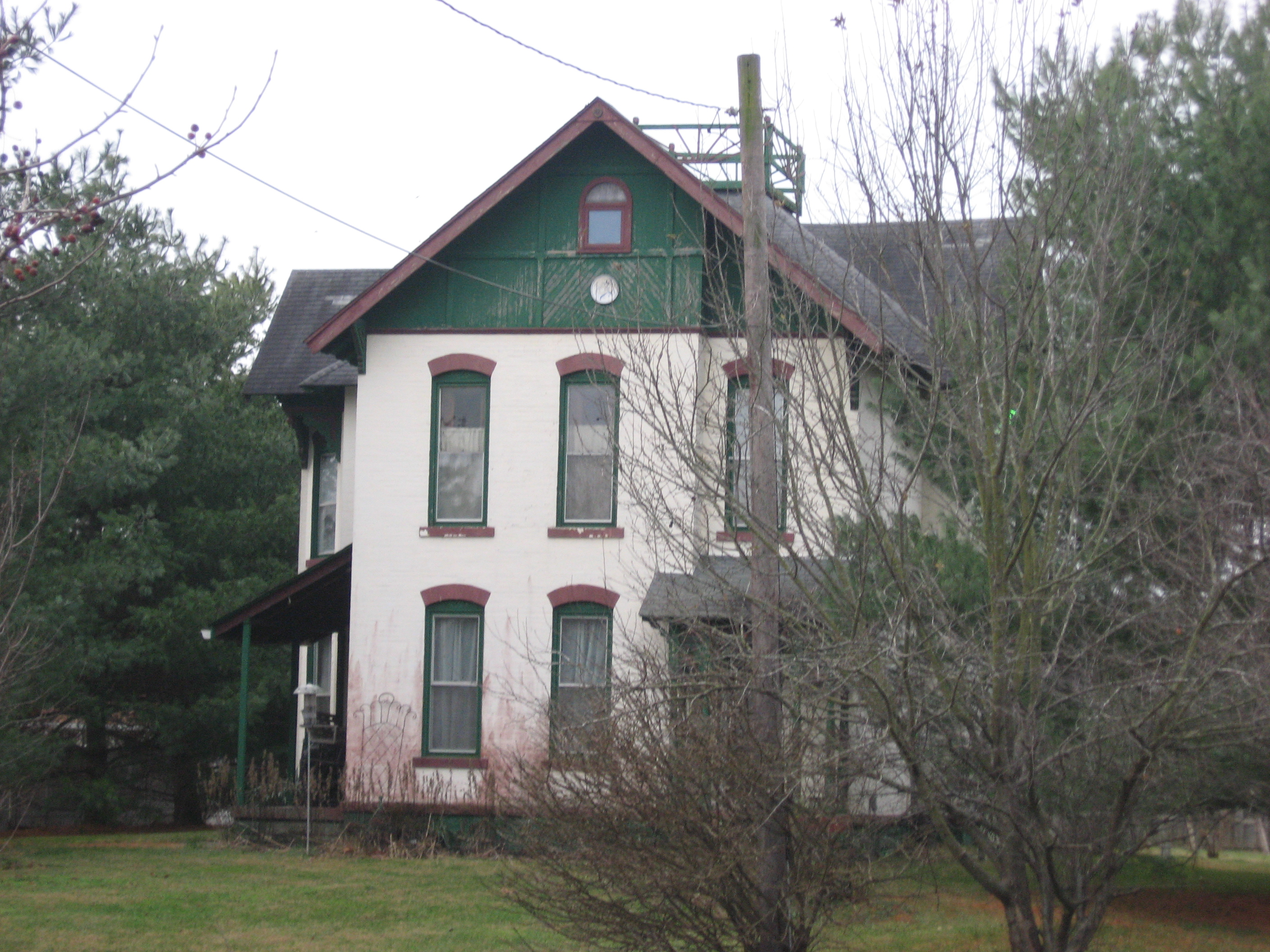
- Blankenship-Hodges-Brown House, December 2011

- Location within Indiana Location within the United States
- Location: 7455 W. Old State Road 67, southwest of Paragon in Ray Township, Morgan County, Indiana
- Coordinates: 39°23′42″N 86°34′3″W
- Area: 1.4 acres (0.57 ha)
- Built: c. 1875
- Built by: Blankenship, Philip
- Architectural style: Queen Anne, Stick/eastlake
- NRHP reference No.: 05001012
- Added to NRHP: September 15, 2005

Blankenship-Hodges-Brown House is a historic home located in Ray Township, Morgan County, Indiana. It was built about 1875, and is a 2 1/2-story, Queen Anne / Stick style brick dwelling. It rests on a stone foundation and features a steeply pitched roof, decorative timbering, brackets, and overhanging eaves.

It was listed on the National Register of Historic Places in 2005.
