= Clay Township, Morgan County, Indiana =

Clay Township
- Township
- Location in Morgan County
- Coordinates: 39°31′44″N 86°24′12″W
- Country: United States
- State: Indiana
- County: Morgan

Government
  - Type: Indiana township

Area
  - Total: 30.66 sq mi (79.4 km^{2})
  - Land: 29.99 sq mi (77.7 km^{2})
  - Water: 0.67 sq mi (1.7 km^{2}) 2.19%
- Elevation: 676 ft (206 m)

Population (2020)
  - Total: 4,243
  - Density: 143.1/sq mi (55.3/km^{2})
- Time zone: UTC-5 (Eastern (EST))
  - Summer (DST): UTC-4 (EDT)
- ZIP codes: 46111, 46151, 46158
- GNIS feature ID: 453215

Clay Township is one of fourteen townships in Morgan County, Indiana, United States. As of the 2010 census, its population was 4,292 and it contained 1,707 housing units.

The township contains the incorporated towns of Brooklyn and Bethany, and the unincorporated town of Centerton. The entire township lies within the Metropolitan School District of Martinsville, with elementary schools at both Brooklyn and Centerton.

Clay Township is also home to the Goethe Link Observatory and Bradford Woods, both affiliated to Indiana University.

Fire protection is provided to the township by the Brooklyn Volunteer Fire Department, which operates stations in Brooklyn and on Robb Hill Road.

== History ==
The Franklin Landers-Black and Adams Farm and Bradford Estate are listed on the National Register of Historic Places.

== Geography ==
According to the 2010 census, the township has a total area of 30.66 square miles (79.4 km^{2}), of which 29.99 square miles (77.7 km^{2}) (or 97.81%) is land and 0.67 square miles (1.7 km^{2}) (or 2.19%) is water.

=== Cities, towns, villages ===
- Bethany
- Brooklyn

=== Unincorporated towns ===
- Beech Grove at 39.51727°N 86.446384°W
- Center Valley at 39.513659°N 86.408883°W
- Centerton at 39.515048°N 86.394994°W

(This list is based on USGS data and may include former settlements.)

=== Cemeteries ===
The township contains these two cemeteries: Brooklyn and Butterfield.

=== Major highways ===
- Indiana State Road 67

=== Airports and landing strips ===
- Hilhon Airport

=== Lakes ===
- Jewel Lake
- Old Swimmin Hole Lake

== School districts ==
- Metropolitan School District of Martinsville

== Political districts ==
- Indiana's 4th congressional district
- State House District 47
- State Senate District 37
