= Beech Grove, Morgan County, Indiana =

Beech Grove
- Unincorporated community
- Location within Indiana Location within the United States
- Coordinates: 39°31′02″N 86°26′47″W
- Country: United States
- State: Indiana
- County: Morgan
- Township: Clay
- Elevation: 810 ft (250 m)
- Time zone: UTC-5 (Eastern (EST))
  - Summer (DST): UTC-4 (EDT)
- ZIP code: 46151
- FIPS code: 18-04222
- GNIS feature ID: 430718

Beech Grove is an unincorporated community in Clay Township, Morgan County, in the U.S. state of Indiana.
