= Ray Township =

Ray Township may refer to:

== Canada ==
- Ray township, in Timiskaming District, Ontario

== United States ==
- Ray Township, Franklin County, Indiana
- Ray Township, Morgan County, Indiana
- Ray Township, Michigan
- Ray Township, LaMoure County, North Dakota, in LaMoure County, North Dakota
