= Banta, Indiana =

- Unincorporated community
- Location within Indiana Location within the United States
- Coordinates: 39°31′26″N 86°15′01″W
- Country: United States
- State: Indiana
- County: Johnson, Morgan
- Township: White River, Harrison
- Elevation: 774 ft (236 m)
- Time zone: UTC-5 (Eastern (EST))
  - Summer (DST): UTC-4 (EDT)
- ZIP code: 46106
- FIPS code: 18-03322
- GNIS feature ID: 430477

Banta is an unincorporated community in Johnson and Morgan counties, in the U.S. state of Indiana.

== History ==
A post office was established at Banta in 1883, and remained in operation until it was discontinued in 1904. Banta was named for David Demaree Banta (1833–1896), a Johnson County historian and judge. Prior to 1883, it was called Dresslarsville.

David Banta was a trustee of Indiana University in Bloomington, and was the first dean of its law school, now the Maurer School of Law. He served from 1889 until his death in 1896. His elder son George founded the Banta Corporation in 1901 in Menasha, Wisconsin.
