= Madison Township, Morgan County, Indiana =

Madison Township
- Township
- Location in Morgan County
- Coordinates: 39°34′57″N 86°18′10″W
- Country: United States
- State: Indiana
- County: Morgan

Government
  - Type: Indiana township
  - Trustee: Larry Ellis

Area
  - Total: 27.9 sq mi (72 km^{2})
  - Land: 27.5 sq mi (71 km^{2})
  - Water: 0.4 sq mi (1.0 km^{2}) 1.43%
- Elevation: 732 ft (223 m)

Population (2020)
  - Total: 10,191
  - Density: 353/sq mi (136/km^{2})
- Time zone: UTC-5 (Eastern (EST))
  - Summer (DST): UTC-4 (EDT)
- ZIP codes: 46113, 46158
- GNIS feature ID: 453595
- Website: madisontwp.org

Madison Township is one of fourteen townships in Morgan County, Indiana, United States. As of the 2010 census, its population was 9,705 and it contained 3,608 housing units.

== Geography ==
According to the 2010 census, the township has a total area of 27.9 square miles (72 km^{2}), of which 27.5 square miles (71 km^{2}) (or 98.57%) is land and 0.4 square miles (1.0 km^{2}) (or 1.43%) is water.

=== Cities, towns, villages ===
- Mooresville (east edge)

=== Unincorporated towns ===
- Crestview Heights at 39.585047°N 86.316381°W
- Fields at 39.546158°N 86.333325°W
- Five Points at 39.581436°N 86.316936°W
- Landersdale at 39.619491°N 86.263046°W
- Miller at 39.620602°N 86.281935°W
- Wiser at 39.612269°N 86.293602°W

(This list is based on USGS data and may include former settlements.)

=== Cemeteries ===
The township contains these two cemeteries: Mount Olive and Silon.

=== Airports and landing strips ===
- Owen Field

=== Lakes ===
- Leona Lake
- Popular Grove Lake
- Lambert Lake

== School districts ==
- Mooresville Consolidated School Corporation

== Political districts ==
- Indiana's 4th congressional district
- State House District 47
- State House District 91
- State Senate District 35
- State Senate District 37
