= Hastings Schoolhouse =

- Formerly listed on the U.S. National Register of Historic Places
- Location within Indiana Location within the United States
- Nearest city: Martinsville, Indiana
- Coordinates: 39°22′20.8″N 86°28′38.8″W
- Area: less than one acre
- Built: 1870
- Built by: Douglas, Perry F.
- Architectural style: Gable front
- MPS: Indiana's Public Common and High Schools MPS
- NRHP reference No.: 99000299

Significant dates
- Added to NRHP: March 12, 1999
- Removed from NRHP: June 1, 2004

Hastings Schoolhouse, also known as Washington Township District No. 12 , was a historic one-room school building located half a mile south of the intersection of E Hacker Creek and Liberty Church Roads in Martinsville, Indiana on the property of the Maxwell Farm. It was built in 1870, and was a one-story, gable front, rectangular brick building. It measured 22 feet by 33 feet. The building was damaged by a windstorm in April 2001, knocking down one of the walls. It later blew down in a tornado in September 2002.

It was listed on the National Register of Historic Places in 1999 and delisted in 2004.
