= Monroe Township, Morgan County, Indiana =

Monroe Township
- Township
- Location in Morgan County
- Coordinates: 39°34′58″N 86°28′50″W
- Country: United States
- State: Indiana
- County: Morgan

Government
  - Type: Indiana township

Area
  - Total: 26.62 sq mi (68.9 km^{2})
  - Land: 26.47 sq mi (68.6 km^{2})
  - Water: 0.15 sq mi (0.39 km^{2}) 0.56%
- Elevation: 797 ft (243 m)

Population (2020)
  - Total: 5,587
  - Density: 185.2/sq mi (71.5/km^{2})
- Time zone: UTC-5 (Eastern (EST))
  - Summer (DST): UTC-4 (EDT)
- ZIP codes: 46118, 46151, 46157, 46158
- GNIS feature ID: 453643

Monroe Township is one of fourteen townships in Morgan County, Indiana, United States. As of the 2010 census, its population was 4,904 and it contained 1,917 housing units.

== History ==
The Lake Ditch Bridge was listed on the National Register of Historic Places in 2001.

== Geography ==
According to the 2010 census, the township has a total area of 26.62 square miles (68.9 km^{2}), of which 26.47 square miles (68.6 km^{2}) (or 99.44%) is land and 0.15 square miles (0.39 km^{2}) (or 0.56%) is water.

=== Cities, towns, villages ===
- Monrovia

=== Unincorporated towns ===
- Allman at 39.617269°N 86.431106°W
- Gasburg at 39.594491°N 86.43694°W
- Lake Hart at 39.567547°N 86.431939°W

(This list is based on USGS data and may include former settlements.)

=== Cemeteries ===
The township contains these two cemeteries: Bethesda and North Branch.

=== Major highways ===
- Interstate 70

=== Airports and landing strips ===
- Berling Airport

=== Lakes ===
- Echo Lake
- Hart Lake

== School districts ==
- Monroe-Gregg School District

== Political districts ==
- Indiana's 4th congressional district
- State House District 47
- State Senate District 37
