= Brown Township, Morgan County, Indiana =

Brown Township
- Township
- Location in Morgan County
- Coordinates: 39°35′56″N 86°22′31″W
- Country: United States
- State: Indiana
- County: Morgan

Government
  - Type: Indiana township

Area
  - Total: 22.6 sq mi (59 km^{2})
  - Land: 22.33 sq mi (57.8 km^{2})
  - Water: 0.27 sq mi (0.70 km^{2}) 1.19%
- Elevation: 659 ft (201 m)

Population (2020)
  - Total: 13,416
  - Density: 581.1/sq mi (224.4/km^{2})
- Time zone: UTC-5 (Eastern (EST))
  - Summer (DST): UTC-4 (EDT)
- ZIP codes: 46113, 46158
- GNIS feature ID: 453140

Brown Township is one of fourteen townships in Morgan County, Indiana, United States. As of the 2010 census, its population was 12,973 and it contained 5,384 housing units.

== Geography ==
According to the 2010 census, the township has a total area of 22.6 square miles (59 km^{2}), of which 22.33 square miles (57.8 km^{2}) (or 98.81%) is land and 0.27 square miles (0.70 km^{2}) (or 1.19%) is water.

=== Cities, towns, villages ===
- Mooresville (vast majority)

=== Unincorporated towns ===
- Brookmoor at 39.567547°N 86.374716°W
- Ridgewood at 39.60338°N 86.359437°W
- Young at 39.610324°N 86.337492°W

(This list is based on USGS data and may include former settlements.)

=== Cemeteries ===
The township contains these two cemeteries: Brooklyn Rest Park and Monical.

=== Major highways ===
- Indiana State Road 67

=== Airports and landing strips ===
- Kellys Airfield CLOSED

=== Landmarks ===
- Pioneer Park

== Education ==
- Mooresville Consolidated School Corporation

Brown Township residents may obtain a free library card from the Mooresville Public Library in Mooresville.

== Political districts ==
- Indiana's 4th congressional district
- State House District 47
- State House District 91
- State Senate District 37
