= Lake Ditch Bridge =

- U.S. National Register of Historic Places
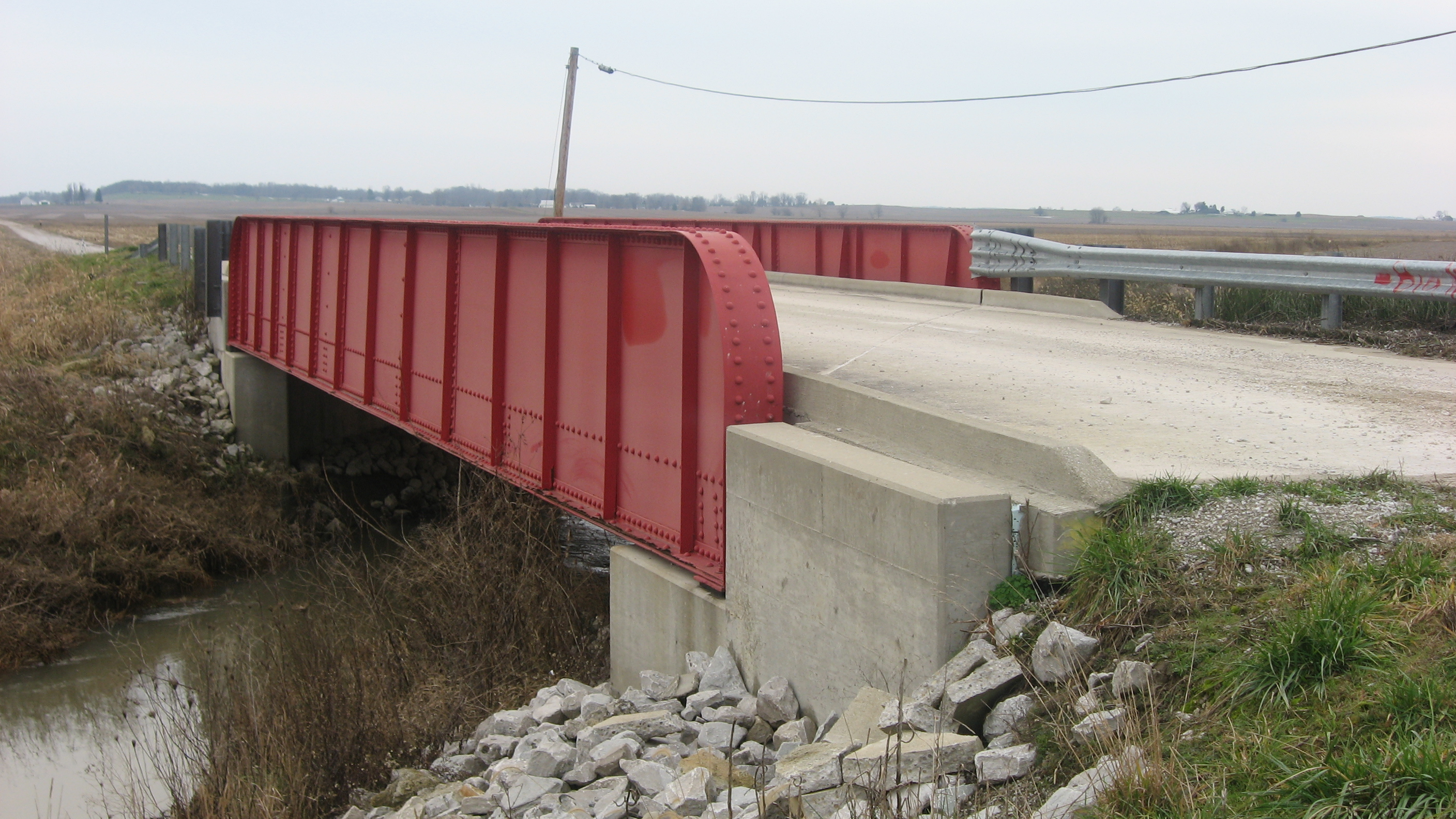
- Lake Ditch Bridge, December 2011

- Location within Indiana Location within the United States
- Location: Junction of Lamb's Creek and W. Old State Road 67, west of Monrovia in Monroe Township, Morgan County, Indiana
- Coordinates: 39°34′35″N 86°31′35″W
- Area: less than one acre
- Built: 1895
- Built by: Chicago Bridge and Iron Co.
- Architectural style: Plate girder bridge
- NRHP reference No.: 01000986
- Added to NRHP: September 16, 2001

Lake Ditch Bridge is a historic plate girder bridge located in Monroe Township, Morgan County, Indiana. It was built in 1895 by the Chicago Bridge and Iron Co. It is 58 feet, 6 inches, long and 24 feet, 9 inches wide. It is supported by timber planks and concrete abutments.

It was listed on the National Register of Historic Places in 2001.
