= Hite-Finney House =

Historic house in Indiana, United States

- Formerly listed on the U.S. National Register of Historic Places
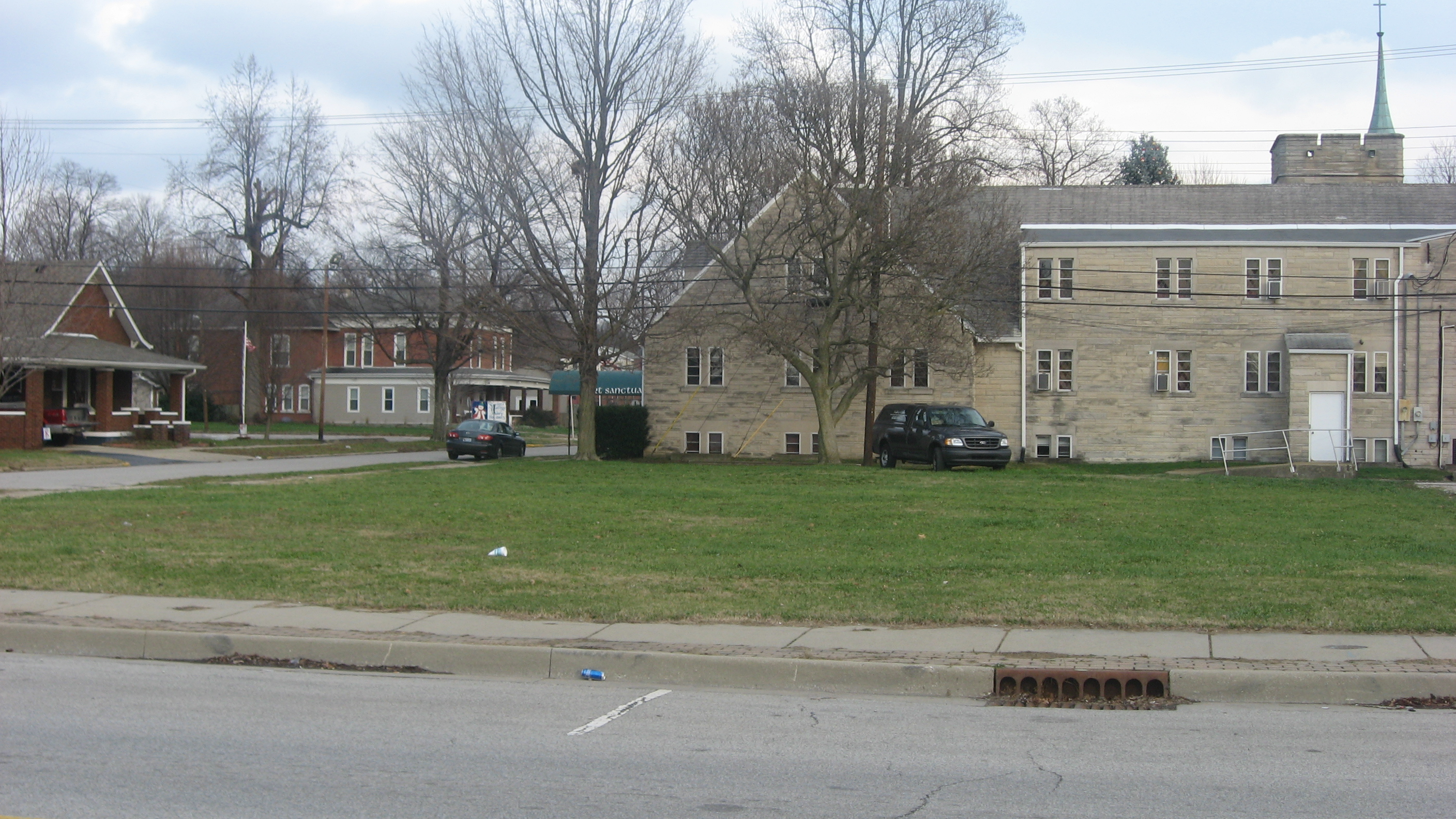
- Site of the house

- Location within Indiana Location within the United States
- Location: 183 N. Jefferson St., Martinsville, Indiana
- Coordinates: 39°25′42″N 86°25′37″W
- Area: Less than 1 acre (0.40 ha)
- Built: 1855
- Architectural style: Greek Revival, Italianate
- NRHP reference No.: 95001532

Significant dates
- Added to NRHP: January 11, 1996
- Removed from NRHP: June 15, 2012

Hite-Finney House was a historic building at 183 North Jefferson Street in Martinsville, Indiana. It was built in 1855, and was a two-story, transitional Greek Revival / Italianate style brick I-house. The building partially collapsed in 2003. It was destroyed by fire in August 2006, and was fully demolished in October 2009.

It was listed on the National Register of Historic Places on January 11, 1996. It was removed in 2012 after its destruction.

== See also ==
- National Register of Historic Places listings in Morgan County, Indiana
