= Paragon, Indiana =

- Town
- Location in Morgan County, Indiana
- Coordinates: 39°23′42″N 86°33′46″W
- Country: United States
- State: Indiana
- County: Morgan
- Township: Ray

Area
  - Total: 0.27 sq mi (0.71 km^{2})
  - Land: 0.27 sq mi (0.71 km^{2})
  - Water: 0 sq mi (0.00 km^{2})
- Elevation: 581 ft (177 m)

Population (2020)
  - Total: 556
  - Density: 2,021/sq mi (780.5/km^{2})
- Time zone: UTC-5 (Eastern (EST))
  - Summer (DST): UTC-4 (EDT)
- ZIP code: 46166
- Area code: 765
- FIPS code: 18-57870
- GNIS feature ID: 2396847

Paragon is a town in Ray Township, Morgan County, in the U.S. state of Indiana. The population was 556 at the 2020 census, down from 659 in 2010.

== History ==
Paragon was founded in the early 1850s about the same time the first store was opened in the community in 1852. A post office has been in operation at Paragon since 1868.

== Geography ==
Paragon is in southwestern Morgan County along Indiana State Road 67, which leads northeast 8 miles (13 km) to Martinsville, the county seat, and southwest 16 miles (26 km) to Spencer.

According to the U.S. Census Bureau, Paragon has a total area of 0.28 square miles (0.73 km^{2}), all land. The town is in the valley of the White River, which passes 1.5 miles (2.4 km) to the south.

== Demographics ==
Historical population
| Census | Pop. | Note | %± |
|---|---|---|---|
| 1880 | 306 | | — |
| 1900 | 413 | | — |
| 1910 | 409 | | −1.0% |
| 1920 | 444 | | 8.6% |
| 1930 | 366 | | −17.6% |
| 1940 | 454 | | 24.0% |
| 1950 | 463 | | 2.0% |
| 1960 | 560 | | 21.0% |
| 1970 | 538 | | −3.9% |
| 1980 | 538 | | 0.0% |
| 1990 | 515 | | −4.3% |
| 2000 | 663 | | 28.7% |
| 2010 | 659 | | −0.6% |
| 2020 | 556 | | −15.6% |
U.S. Decennial Census

=== 2010 census ===
As of the census of 2010, there were 659 people, 233 households, and 172 families living in the town. The population density was 1,938.2 inhabitants per square mile (748.3/km^{2}). There were 261 housing units at an average density of 767.6 per square mile (296.4/km^{2}). The racial makeup of the town was 97.4% White, 0.2% African American, 0.5% from other races, and 2.0% from two or more races. Hispanic or Latino of any race were 0.9% of the population.

There were 233 households, of which 39.5% had children under the age of 18 living with them, 52.8% were married couples living together, 15.0% had a female householder with no husband present, 6.0% had a male householder with no wife present, and 26.2% were non-families. 18.5% of all households were made up of individuals, and 7.3% had someone living alone who was 65 years of age or older. The average household size was 2.83 and the average family size was 3.18.

The median age in the town was 33.3 years. 30.2% of residents were under the age of 18; 10.6% were between the ages of 18 and 24; 24.7% were from 25 to 44; 23.9% were from 45 to 64; and 10.6% were 65 years of age or older. The gender makeup of the town was 48.4% male and 51.6% female.

=== 2000 census ===
As of the census of 2000, there were 663 people, 237 households, and 176 families living in the town. The population density was 2,640.8 inhabitants per square mile (1,019.6/km^{2}). There were 275 housing units at an average density of 1,095.4 per square mile (422.9/km^{2}). The racial makeup of the town was 99.70% White, 0.15% from other races, and 0.15% from two or more races. Hispanic or Latino of any race were 0.60% of the population.

There were 237 households, out of which 39.7% had children under the age of 18 living with them, 62.4% were married couples living together, 6.8% had a female householder with no husband present, and 25.7% were non-families. 18.1% of all households were made up of individuals, and 11.8% had someone living alone who was 65 years of age or older. The average household size was 2.80 and the average family size was 3.18.

In the town, the population was spread out, with 32.4% under the age of 18, 7.8% from 18 to 24, 29.9% from 25 to 44, 19.0% from 45 to 64, and 10.9% who were 65 years of age or older. The median age was 31 years. For every 100 females, there were 99.7 males. For every 100 females age 18 and over, there were 99.1 males.

The median income for a household in the town was $37,333, and the median income for a family was $38,971. Males had a median income of $33,750 versus $21,354 for females. The per capita income for the town was $14,193. About 11.5% of families and 13.3% of the population were below the poverty line, including 10.8% of those under age 18 and 9.8% of those age 65 or over.
