= Centerton, Indiana =

- Census-designated place
- Location within Indiana Location within the United States
- Coordinates: 39°30′58″N 86°23′45″W
- Country: United States
- State: Indiana
- County: Morgan
- Township: Clay

Area
  - Total: 0.12 sq mi (0.31 km^{2})
  - Land: 0.12 sq mi (0.31 km^{2})
  - Water: 0.0 sq mi (0 km^{2})
- Elevation: 630 ft (190 m)
- Time zone: UTC-5 (Eastern (EST))
  - Summer (DST): UTC-4 (EDT)
- ZIP code: 46151
- FIPS code: 18-11782
- GNIS feature ID: 2830471

Centerton is an unincorporated community and census-designated place (CDP) in Clay Township, Morgan County, in the U.S. state of Indiana.

== History ==
Centerton was laid out in 1854. A post office was established at Centerton in 1854, and remained in operation until it was discontinued in 1893.

== Geography ==
Centerton is located northeast of the center of Morgan County. Indiana State Road 67 runs along the western edge of the community, leading south 8 miles (13 km) to Martinsville, the county seat, and north 7 miles (11 km) to Mooresville. Downtown Indianapolis is 23 miles (37 km) to the northeast.

According to the U.S. Census Bureau, the Centerton CDP has an area of 0.12 square miles (0.31 km^{2}), all land. The community is in the valley of the White River, which passes 1 mile (1.6 km) to the south.

== Demographics ==
The United States Census Bureau delineated Centerton as a census designated place in the 2022 American Community Survey.

== Education ==
Grade school students attend Centerton Elementary School, a part of the school district of Martinsville. Students from Centerton also attend Bell Intermediate Academy, John R. Wooden Middle School, and Martinsville High School.

== Notable people ==
Centerton was the childhood home of basketball coach John Wooden, whose family farm sits on the edge of town (with historical marker), and where the Johnny Wooden Interurban parkway runs.
