= Bradford Estate =

- U.S. National Register of Historic Places
- U.S. Historic district
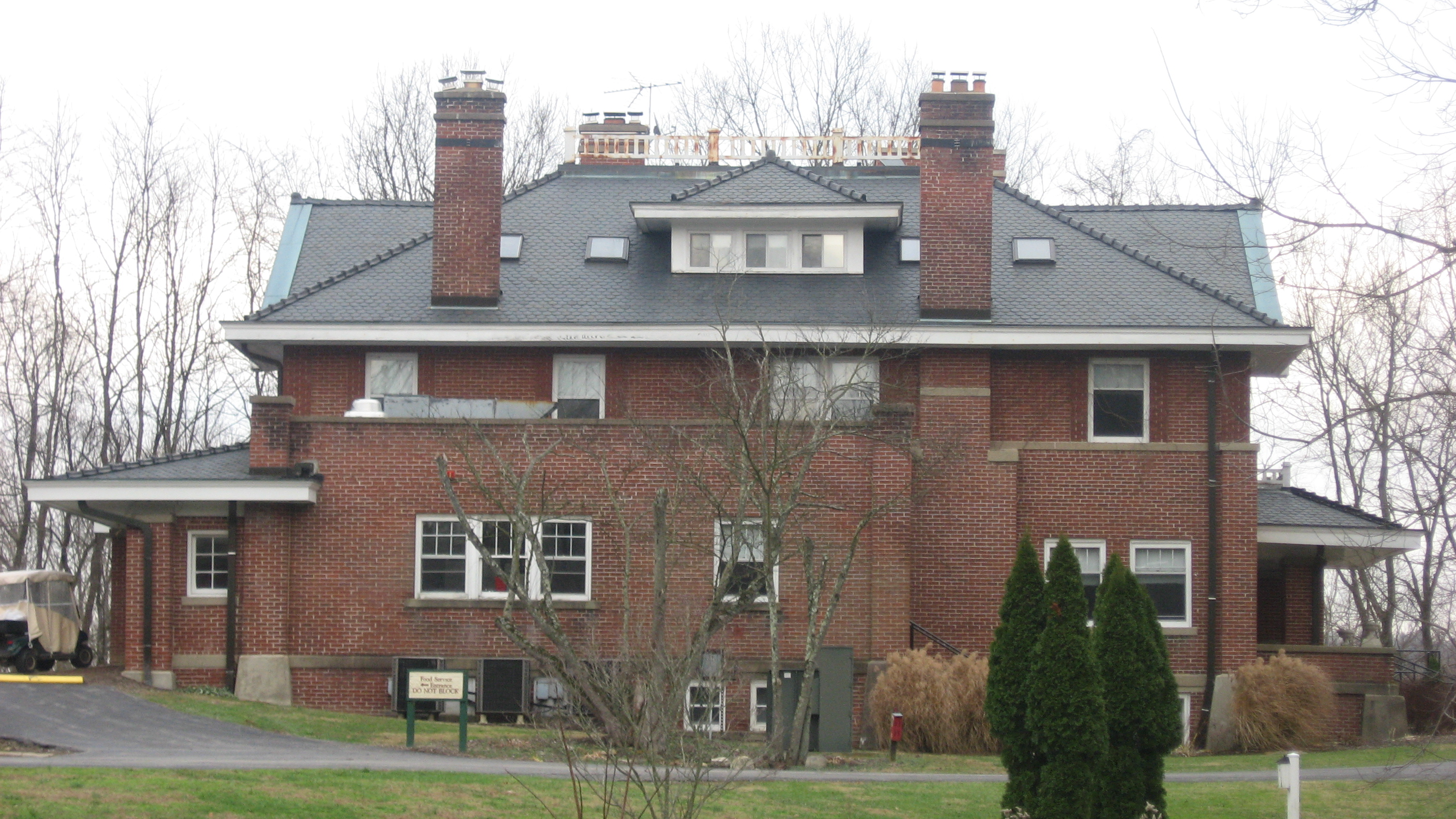
- House at the Bradford Estate, December 2011

- Location within Indiana Location within the United States
- Location: 5040 IN 67 North, Martinsville in Clay Township, Morgan County, Indiana
- Coordinates: 39°29′56″N 86°25′30″W
- Area: 2.5 acres (1.0 ha)
- Built: c. 1850, c. 1900, 1909, 1912
- Architectural style: Prairie School, Double-Pen
- NRHP reference No.: 89000236
- Added to NRHP: April 3, 1989

Bradford Estate, also known as Bradford Woods, is a historic estate and national historic district located in Clay Township, Morgan County, Indiana. The original house was built about 1850, and is a one-story, double pen vernacular frame dwelling. It features a full-width shed porch. The Campbell House is a 1 1/2-story frame dwelling sheathed in red brick in 1920. It was moved to its present site in 1912 with the building of the manor house. The manor house was built in 1912, and is a 2 1/2-story, Prairie School style brick dwelling. It features a hip roofed porch supported by two piers. Also on the property are the contributing spring house (c. 1900) and carriage house (1909).

It was listed on the National Register of Historic Places in 1989.
