= Lake Hart, Indiana =

- Unincorporated town
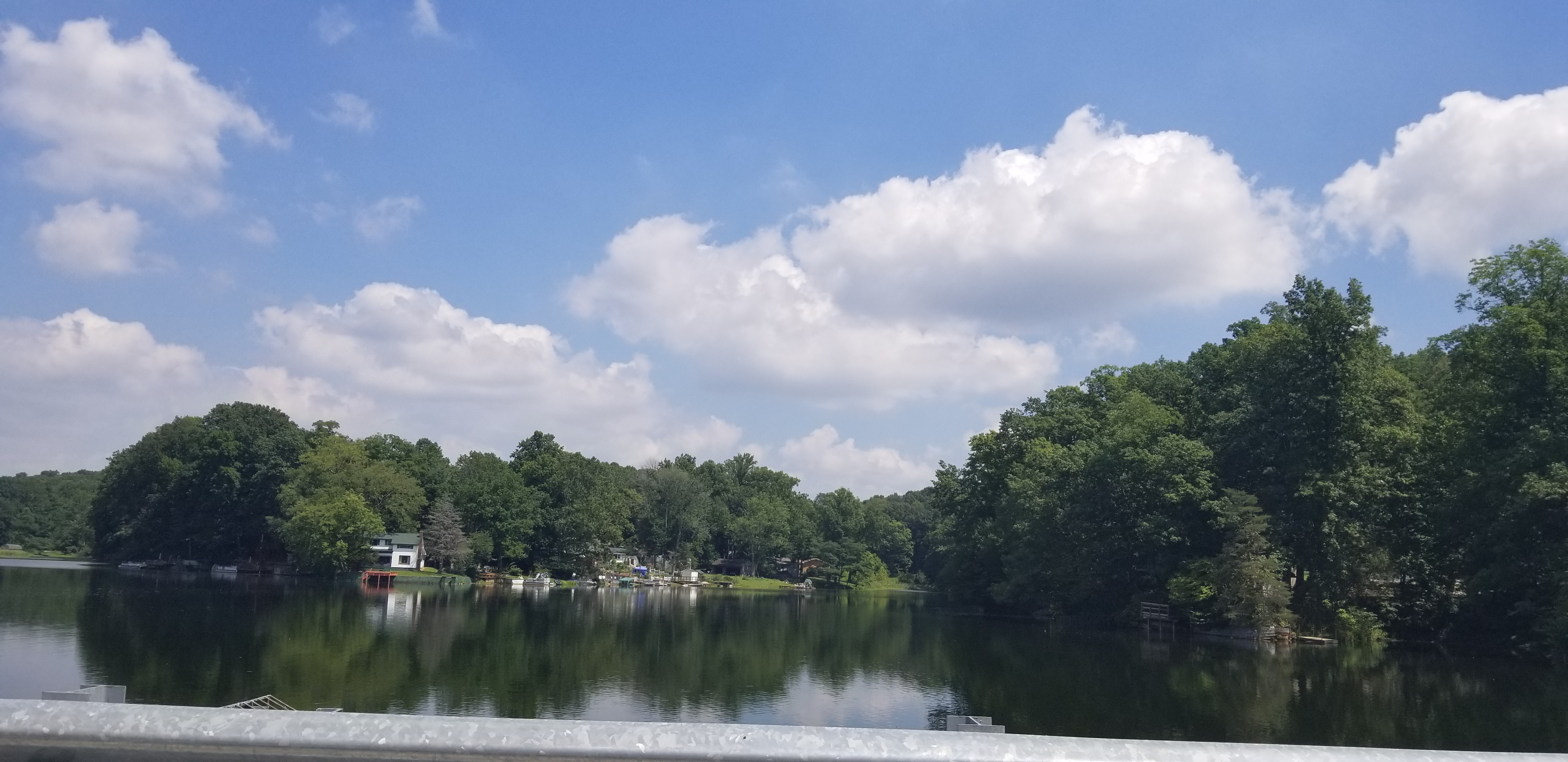

- Location within Indiana Location within the United States
- Coordinates: 39°34′3″N 86°25′55″W
- Country: United States
- State: Indiana
- County: Morgan
- Township: Monroe
- Elevation: 768 ft (234 m)

Population (1990)
  - Total: 213
- Time zone: UTC-5 (Eastern (EST))
  - Summer (DST): UTC-4 (EDT)
- ZIP codes: 46158
- GNIS feature ID: 1669482

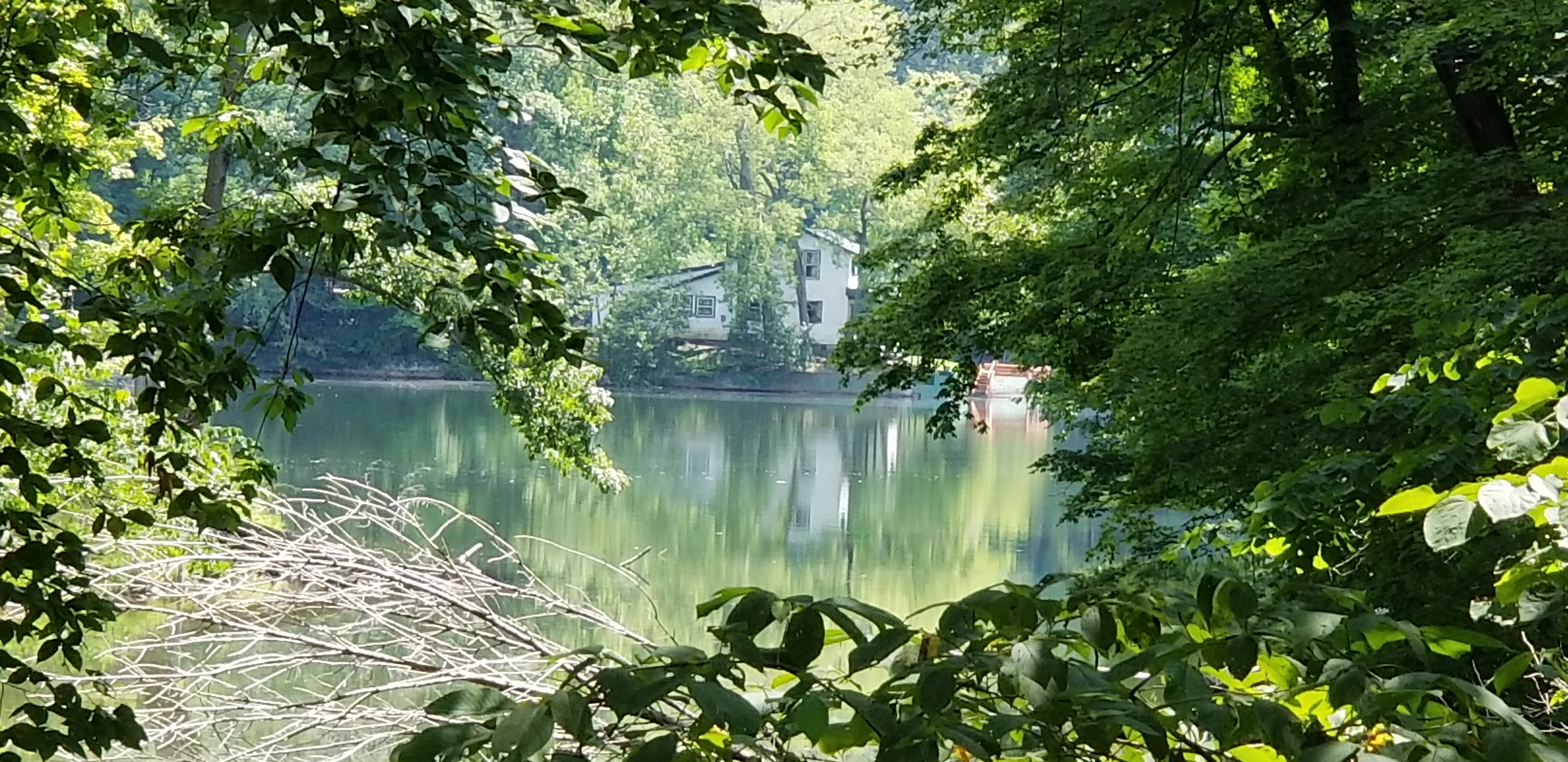
Lake Hart

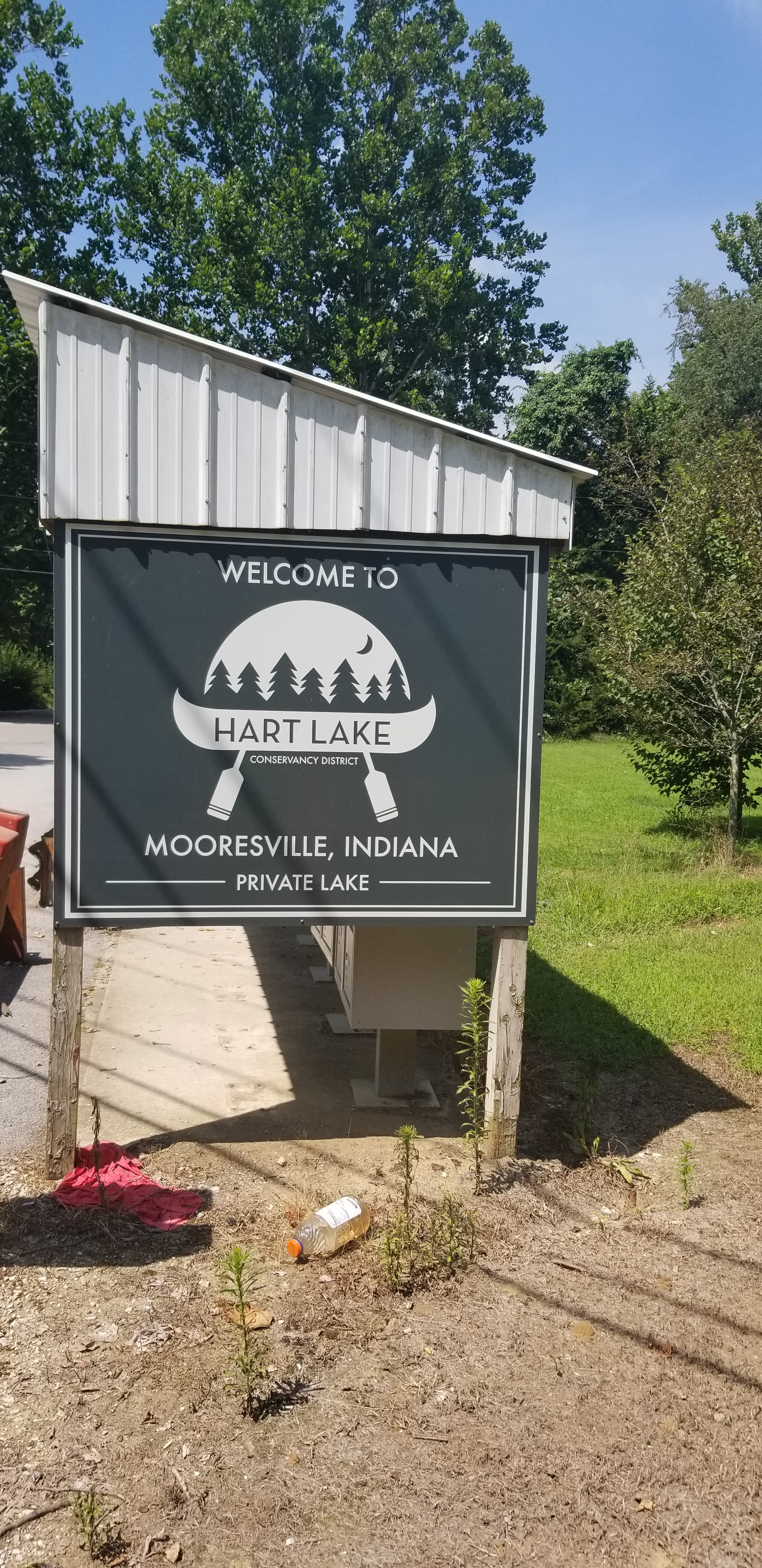
Lake Hart sign

Lake Hart is an unincorporated town, formerly incorporated, in Monroe Township, Morgan County, in the U.S. state of Indiana. In the 1990 census, the town had a total population of 213.

== History ==
Incorporated in the 1970s with a population of 231, the town was disincorporated on September 23, 1998. On September 13, 1985, the former town was declared a legal Conservancy District per the Indiana Conservancy District Act in Morgan County Circuit Court under Cause # C84 C 443. The name of the community and of the Conservancy District has since been Hart Lake. Lake Hart is the name of the former town. The purpose for the Hart Lake Conservancy District was amended in Morgan County Circuit Court on January 16, 1987, to include the legal purposes of procuring water and sewage service for the community. While not an incorporated town, a Conservancy District is a legal governmental entity with a duly elected board of directors, has a tax base, is subject to the Indiana Governmental Agencies laws regarding budgeting, and is subject to audit by the State Board of Accounts.

== Geography ==
Hart Lake is located southwest of Mooresville.
