= Jefferson Township, Morgan County, Indiana =

Jefferson Township
- Township
- Location in Morgan County
- Coordinates: 39°27′07″N 86°29′40″W
- Country: United States
- State: Indiana
- County: Morgan

Government
  - Type: Indiana township

Area
  - Total: 35.61 sq mi (92.2 km^{2})
  - Land: 34.97 sq mi (90.6 km^{2})
  - Water: 0.64 sq mi (1.7 km^{2}) 1.80%
- Elevation: 620 ft (189 m)

Population (2020)
  - Total: 3,617
  - Density: 93.6/sq mi (36.1/km^{2})
- Time zone: UTC-5 (Eastern (EST))
  - Summer (DST): UTC-4 (EDT)
- ZIP codes: 46151, 46166
- GNIS feature ID: 453491

Jefferson Township is one of fourteen townships in Morgan County, Indiana, United States. As of the 2010 census, its population was 3,274 and it contained 1,309 housing units.

== Geography ==
According to the 2010 census, the township has a total area of 35.61 square miles (92.2 km^{2}), of which 34.97 square miles (90.6 km^{2}) (or 98.20%) is land and 0.64 square miles (1.7 km^{2}) (or 1.80%) is water.

=== Unincorporated towns ===
- Hyndsdale at 39.415881°N 86.484718°W

(This list is based on USGS data and may include former settlements.)

=== Cemeteries ===
The township contains these six cemeteries: Bethlehem, Foster, Hynds, Mount Gilead, Schultz and Stout.

=== Major highways ===
- Indiana State Road 44
- Indiana State Road 67

== School districts ==
- Metropolitan School District of Martinsville

== Political districts ==
- Indiana's 4th congressional district
- State House District 47
- State Senate District 37
