= Franklin Landers–Black and Adams Farm =

- U.S. National Register of Historic Places
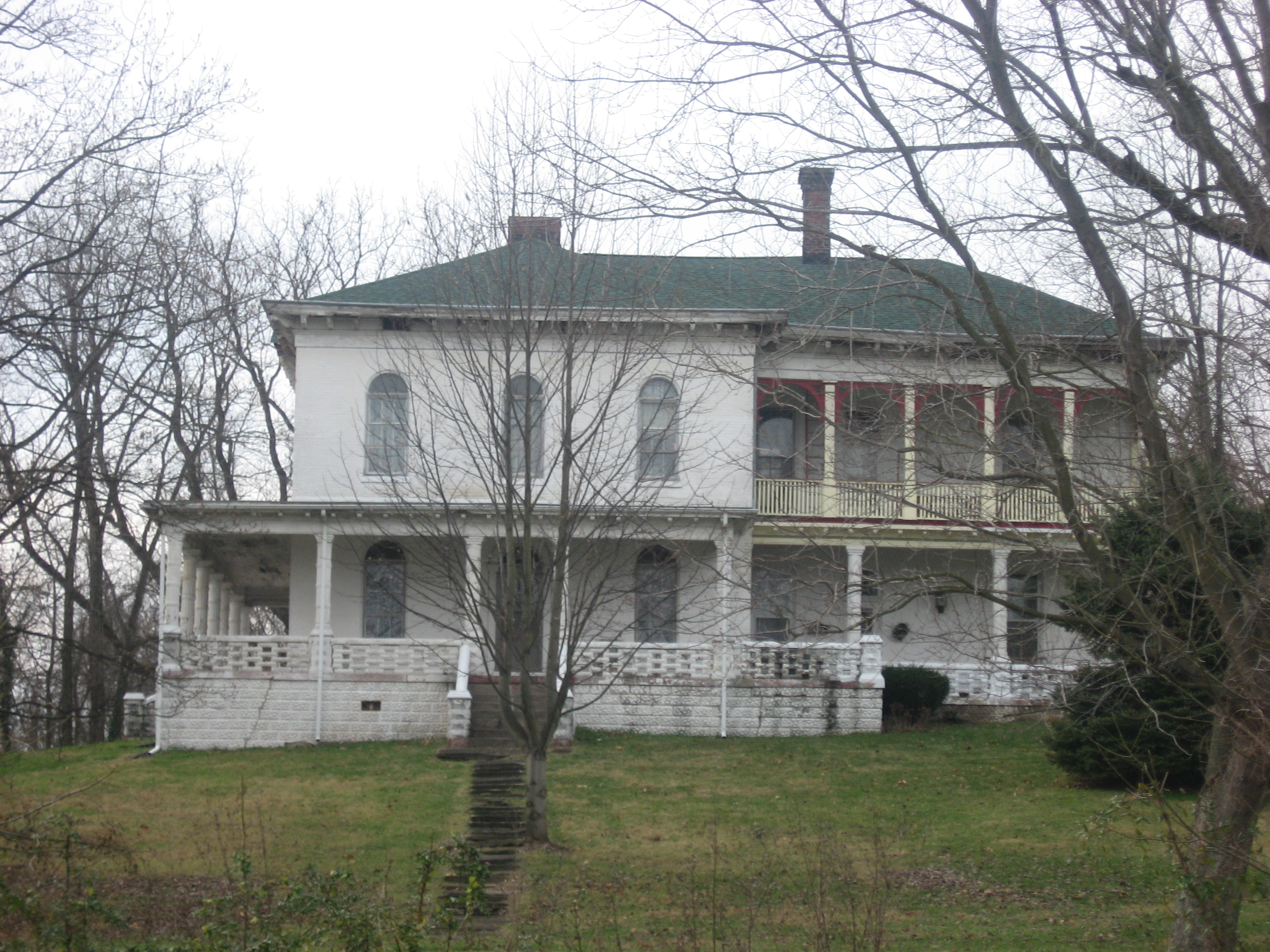
- Franklin Landers–Black and Adams Farmhouse, December 2011

- Location within Indiana Location within the United States
- Location: 2430 S. Old IN 67, Brooklyn and Clay Township, Morgan County, Indiana
- Coordinates: 39°32′15″N 86°22′23″W
- Area: 6.2 acres (2.5 ha)
- Built: 1862
- Architectural style: Italianate, Dairy barn
- NRHP reference No.: 00001142
- Added to NRHP: September 22, 2000

Franklin Landers–Black and Adams Farm (named for original owner Franklin Landers and later owners Black and Adams), also known as Mt. Aetna Stock Farm, is a historic home and dairy farm located in Brooklyn and Clay Township, Morgan County, Indiana. The farmhouse was built in 1862, and is a two-story, rectangular, Italianate style brick dwelling with a rear ell. It has a cross-gable roof, wraparound porch, and features projecting eaves with decorative brackets. Also on the property are the contributing dairy barn (1907–1908), two garages, calf barn, ice house, and acetylene pit.

It was listed on the National Register of Historic Places in 2000.
