= Lake Hart (Winter Haven, Florida) =

- Location within Florida Location within the United States
- Location: south Winter Haven, Florida
- Coordinates: 27.9525°N 81.6717°W
- Type: natural freshwater lake
- Basin countries: United States
- Max. length: 2,590 feet (790 m)
- Max. width: 1,675 feet (511 m)
- Surface area: 67.85 acres (27 ha)
- Average depth: 8.7 feet (2.7 m)
- Max. depth: 20.6 feet (6.3 m)
- Water volume: 214,665,099 US gallons (812,595,800 L)
- Surface elevation: 121 feet (37 m)

Lake Hart is actually two separate bodies of water that are joined as one body in very rainy years. The smaller body is circular and is northeast of the main body. The main body is in the shape of a figure eight with an oval body connected by a wide channel of water. Lake Hart is a natural freshwater lake with an 67.85-acre (274,600 m^{2}) surface area. It is bordered on the west by residences in a gated community. On the south and east are residences in the Lake Ashton gated community. To the northeast and north are low-lying areas with no residential development on them. This lake is on the south fringe of Winter Haven, Florida.

There is no public access to Lake Hart, as its shores nowhere border public property. Although there is nowhere for the fishing public to access the lake, the Hook and Bullet website says Lake Gross contains largemouth bass, bluegill and crappie.
