= Monrovia, Indiana =

Town in the United States

- Town
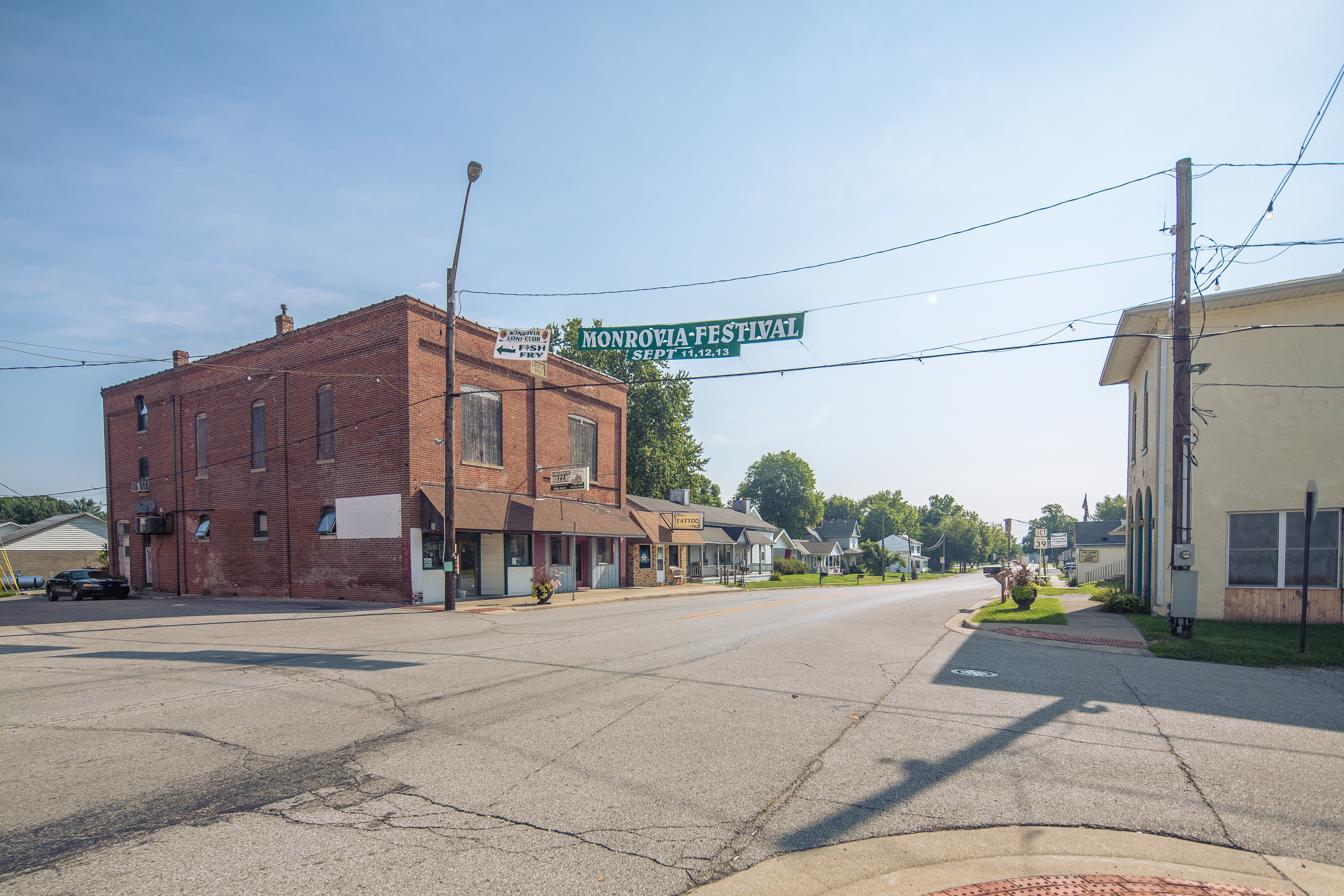
- Downtown Monrovia

- Seal

- Location in Morgan County, Indiana
- Coordinates: 39°35′03″N 86°28′45″W
- Country: United States
- State: Indiana
- County: Morgan
- Township: Monroe

Area
  - Total: 1.80 sq mi (4.65 km^{2})
  - Land: 1.80 sq mi (4.65 km^{2})
  - Water: 0 sq mi (0.00 km^{2})
- Elevation: 794 ft (242 m)

Population (2020)
  - Total: 1,643
  - Density: 915.2/sq mi (353.37/km^{2})
- Time zone: UTC-5 (Eastern (EST))
  - Summer (DST): UTC-4 (EDT)
- ZIP code: 46157
- Area codes: 317, 463
- FIPS code: 18-50580
- GNIS feature ID: 2396774
- Website: monrovia.in.gov

Monrovia is a town in Monroe Township, Morgan County, in the U.S. state of Indiana. The population was 1,643 at the 2020 census, up from 1,063 in 2010.

== History ==
Monrovia was laid out in 1834. The town's name is derived from Monroe Township, named for James Monroe. A post office has been in operation at Monrovia since 1834.

The Lake Ditch Bridge was listed on the National Register of Historic Places in 2001.

The town is the subject of the well-regarded Frederick Wiseman documentary Monrovia, Indiana, released in October 2018.

== Geography ==
Monrovia is located in northern Morgan County at 39°34′46″N 86°28′49″W (39.579389, -86.480402). Indiana State Road 42 passes through the center of town as Main Street, while State Road 39 passes through the center on Chestnut Street. SR 42 leads northeast 6 miles (10 km) to Mooresville and west 9 miles (14 km) to Little Point, while SR 39 leads north 7 miles (11 km) to Belleville and south 12 miles (19 km) to Martinsville, the Morgan county seat. Interstate 70 passes 2 miles (3 km) north of Monrovia, with access from Exit 59 at SR 39. Downtown Indianapolis is 24 miles (39 km) to the northeast.

According to the U.S. Census Bureau, Monrovia has a total area of 1.80 square miles (4.66 km^{2}), of which 0.001 square miles (0.003 km^{2}), or 0.06%, are water. The town sits on a low ridge which drains east toward Sycamore Creek and north toward McCracken Creek, both of which flow toward the White River; to the west the town drains toward Mill Creek, a tributary of the Eel River, which in turn flows to the White River.

== Demographics ==
Historical population
Census	Pop.	Note	%±
2000	628		—
2010	1,063		69.3%
2020	1,643		54.6%
U.S. Decennial Census

=== 2020 census ===
As of the 2020 census, Monrovia had a population of 1,643. The median age was 32.3 years. 30.4% of residents were under the age of 18 and 9.2% of residents were 65 years of age or older. For every 100 females there were 96.1 males, and for every 100 females age 18 and over there were 93.7 males age 18 and over.

0.0% of residents lived in urban areas, while 100.0% lived in rural areas.

There were 560 households in Monrovia, of which 43.6% had children under the age of 18 living in them. Of all households, 54.8% were married-couple households, 16.4% were households with a male householder and no spouse or partner present, and 18.4% were households with a female householder and no spouse or partner present. About 19.9% of all households were made up of individuals and 6.5% had someone living alone who was 65 years of age or older.

There were 580 housing units, of which 3.4% were vacant. The homeowner vacancy rate was 1.6% and the rental vacancy rate was 7.8%.

Racial composition as of the 2020 census
Race	Number	Percent
White	1,511	92.0%
Black or African American	31	1.9%
American Indian and Alaska Native	7	0.4%
Asian	11	0.7%
Native Hawaiian and Other Pacific Islander	0	0.0%
Some other race	13	0.8%
Two or more races	70	4.3%
Hispanic or Latino (of any race)	45	2.7%

=== 2010 census ===
As of the census of 2010, there were 1,063 people, 365 households, and 288 families living in the town. The population density was 600.6 inhabitants per square mile (231.9/km^{2}). There were 402 housing units at an average density of 227.1 per square mile (87.7/km^{2}). The racial makeup of the town was 97.3% White, 1.4% African American, 0.1% Native American, 0.6% Asian, 0.2% from other races, and 0.5% from two or more races. Hispanic or Latino of any race were 1.2% of the population.

There were 365 households, of which 47.1% had children under the age of 18 living with them, 60.5% were married couples living together, 13.4% had a female householder with no husband present, 4.9% had a male householder with no wife present, and 21.1% were non-families. 16.4% of all households were made up of individuals, and 4.6% had someone living alone who was 65 years of age or older. The average household size was 2.91 and the average family size was 3.27.

The median age in the town was 31.2 years. 31.1% of residents were under the age of 18; 8.7% were between the ages of 18 and 24; 32.3% were from 25 to 44; 21% were from 45 to 64; and 6.9% were 65 years of age or older. The gender makeup of the town was 49.3% male and 50.7% female.

=== 2000 census ===
As of the census of 2000, there were 628 people, 234 households, and 187 families living in the town. The population density was 709.1 inhabitants per square mile (273.8/km^{2}). There were 245 housing units at an average density of 276.6 per square mile (106.8/km^{2}). The racial makeup of the town was 99.20% White, 0.16% from other races, and 0.64% from two or more races. Hispanic or Latino of any race were 0.96% of the population.

There were 234 households, out of which 36.8% had children under the age of 18 living with them, 64.1% were married couples living together, 13.2% had a female householder with no husband present, and 19.7% were non-families. 16.7% of all households were made up of individuals, and 5.6% had someone living alone who was 65 years of age or older. The average household size was 2.68 and the average family size was 2.97.

In the town, the population was spread out, with 25.3% under the age of 18, 10.0% from 18 to 24, 27.7% from 25 to 44, 26.3% from 45 to 64, and 10.7% who were 65 years of age or older. The median age was 38 years. For every 100 females, there were 86.4 males. For every 100 females age 18 and over, there were 81.8 males.

The median income for a household in the town was $49,583, and the median income for a family was $53,571. Males had a median income of $32,917 versus $21,111 for females. The per capita income for the town was $20,366. About 6.8% of families and 8.6% of the population were below the poverty line, including 14.4% of those under age 18 and 2.9% of those age 65 or over.

== Education ==
The Monroe-Gregg School District which serves students in Monroe and Gregg townships in Morgan County operates three schools:

- Monrovia Elementary School, recently constructed, houses grades K–5. It replaced Hall Elementary School.
- Monrovia Middle School, houses grades 6–8.
- Monrovia Junior-Senior High School houses grades 9–12.

Hall Elementary School, which had previously housed grades 4–6 (with Monrovia Elementary School housing K–3 and Monrovia Junior-Senior High School housing 7–12), has recently closed.

Monrovia has a public library, a branch of the Morgan County Public Library.

== Notable people ==
- Gary Bettenhausen, IndyCar driver
- John Van Lindley, pomologist and early nurseryman
- Branch McCracken, NCAA championship basketball coach
- John Standeford, NFL wide receiver

== Community Events ==
Monrovia's largest annual event is the Monrovia Festival which is held on the weekend after Labor Day and is organized by the Monrovia Festival and Civic Association.
