= Ray Township, Morgan County, Indiana =

Ray Township
- Township
- Location in Morgan County
- Coordinates: 39°24′32″N 86°35′12″W
- Country: United States
- State: Indiana
- County: Morgan

Government
  - Type: Indiana township

Area
  - Total: 25.78 sq mi (66.8 km^{2})
  - Land: 25.56 sq mi (66.2 km^{2})
  - Water: 0.22 sq mi (0.57 km^{2}) 0.85%
- Elevation: 750 ft (230 m)

Population (2020)
  - Total: 1,542
  - Density: 63.8/sq mi (24.6/km^{2})
- Time zone: UTC-5 (Eastern (EST))
  - Summer (DST): UTC-4 (EDT)
- ZIP codes: 46151, 46166, 47433
- GNIS feature ID: 453783

Ray Township is one of fourteen townships in Morgan County, Indiana, United States. As of the 2010 census, its population was 1,631 and it contained 648 housing units.

== History ==
The Blankenship-Hodges-Brown House was listed on the National Register of Historic Places in 2005.

== Geography ==
According to the 2010 census, the township has a total area of 25.78 square miles (66.8 km^{2}), of which 25.56 square miles (66.2 km^{2}) (or 99.15%) is land and 0.22 square miles (0.57 km^{2}) (or 0.85%) is water.

=== Cities, towns, villages ===
- Paragon

=== Unincorporated towns ===
- Whitaker at 39.379769°N 86.607501°W

(This list is based on USGS data and may include former settlements.)

=== Cemeteries ===
The township contains these three cemeteries: Friendship Park, Goss and Stierwalt.

=== Major highways ===
- Indiana State Road 67

== School districts ==
- Metropolitan School District of Martinsville

== Political districts ==
- Indiana's 4th congressional district
- State House District 47
- State Senate District 37
