= Metropolitan School District of Martinsville =

School district in Indiana

Location
- 389 East Jackson St. Martinsville, Indiana Martinsville, Indiana United States

District information
- Grades: Preschool through 12th grade + Alternative School + Adult Night School
- Superintendent: Interim

Students and staff
- Students: 4,381
- Teachers: 322

Other information
- Website: msdofmartinsville.org

The Metropolitan School District of Martinsville is a school district in Morgan County, Indiana, United States.

== Schools ==
=== Preschools ===
- STEM Sprouts Prekindergarten
- Special Services Developmental Preschool
- Title I Preschool

=== Elementary Schools ( Pre-Kindergarten – 4th Grade) ===
- Brooklyn STEM Academy (2016 Certified STEM school by the Indiana Department of Education)
- Centerton Elementary (2019 rated a 4 star school by the Indiana Department of Education)
- Charles L. Smith Fine Arts Academy (Fine arts programming + state educational curriculum)
- Green Township Elementary (Agriculture programming + state educational curriculum)
- Poston Road Elementary (Spanish-immersion programming + state educational curriculum)
- Paragon Elementary (Project-based Learning programming + state educational curriculum))
- South Elementary School of Communications

=== Intermediate School ( 5th – 6th Grades) ===
- Bell Intermediate Academy

=== Middle School (7th – 8th Grades) ===
- John R. Wooden Middle School

=== High School (9th – 12th Grades) ===
- Martinsville High School (Received 'A' rating distinction from the Indiana Dept of Education)

=== Alternative Schools ===
- Artesian Center for Excellence (A.C.E) located at Martinsville High School
- Night School for adults located at Martinsville High School

2021-2024 - (2021) District denied transgender student "A.C." access to boys facilities; (2023) 7th Circuit U.S. Court of Appeals in Chicago upheld an order granting transgender boys access to the boys’ bathroom; (2024) U.S. Supreme Court refused to take up appeal from 7th Circuit allowing that order to stand, seen as victory for transgender students.US Supreme Court won’t review Indiana school’s trans bathroom case ｜ New York Daily News

2018-2019 - District became a GAFE (Google Apps For Education) school, and is a Digital Citizenship Certified school through Common Sense Media.

2017-2018 - 1:1 digital education was implemented district wide. Every student received either an iPad or Chromebook to assist with their education.

2019 - the Indiana Student State Chess Championship held at Martinsville High School

2019 - Artesian Business PRIDE/ Governor's Work Certification program began

2018- Senior Success Center (SSC) added to Martinsville High School to assist seniors with preparation for college, vocational training or the workforce after high school.

Martinsville has many academic clubs. The school's Business Professionals of America (BPA) club participates in state competitions. The school has a class that produces an online publication, breakingblue.org.
