= Morgan County, Indiana =

County in Indiana, United States

- County
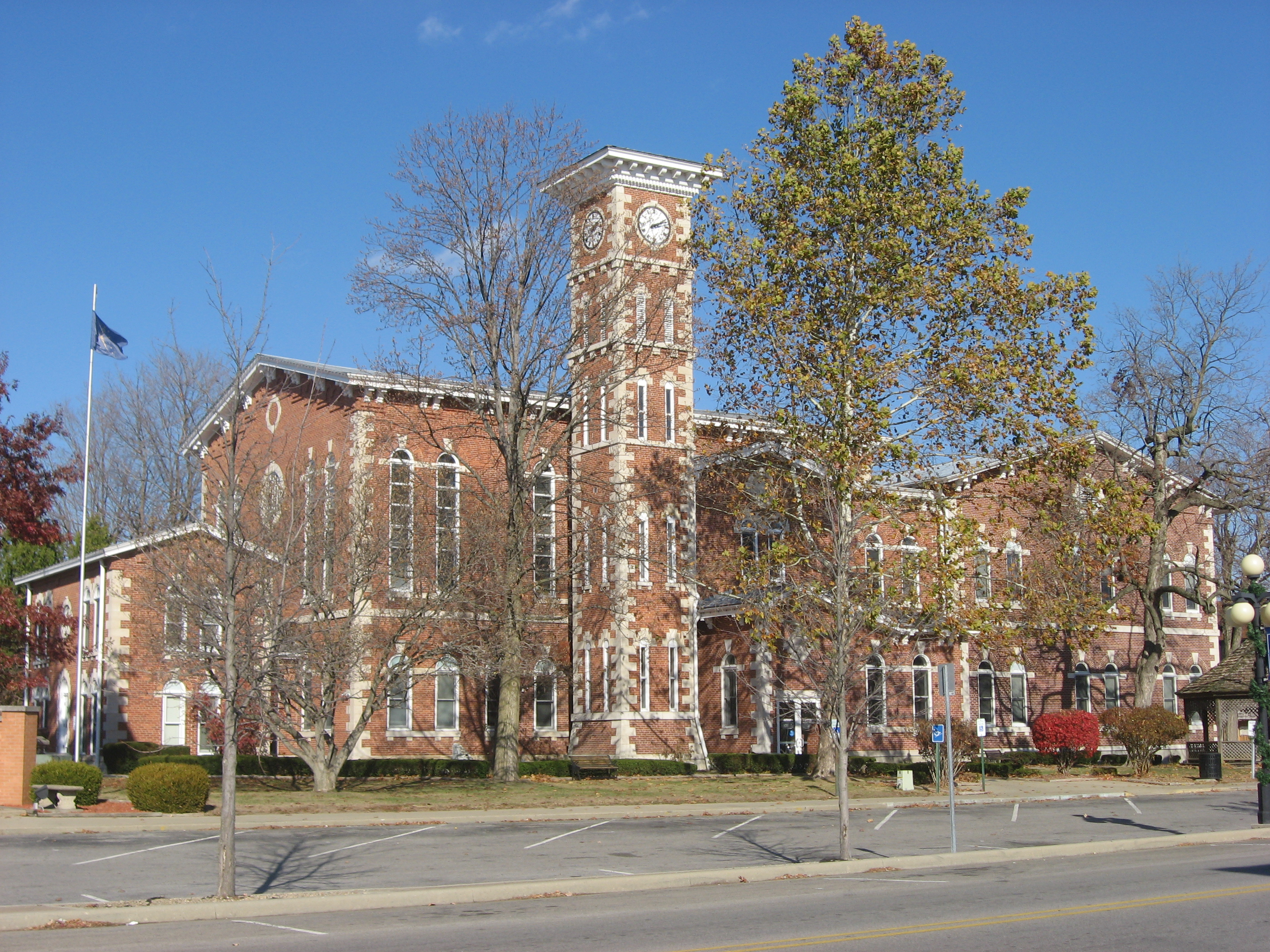
- Morgan County Courthouse in Martinsville

- Flag

- Location within the U.S. state of Indiana
- Coordinates: 39°29′N 86°27′W
- Country: United States
- State: Indiana
- Founded: February 15, 1822 (authorized); December 1822 (organized)
- Named for: Gen. Daniel Morgan
- Seat: Martinsville
- Largest city: Martinsville

Area
  - Total: 409.43 sq mi (1,060.4 km^{2})
  - Land: 403.97 sq mi (1,046.3 km^{2})
  - Water: 5.46 sq mi (14.1 km^{2}) 1.33%

Population (2020)
  - Total: 71,780
  - Estimate (2025): 74,967 ▲
  - Density: 180/sq mi (69/km^{2})
- Time zone: UTC−5 (Eastern)
  - Summer (DST): UTC−4 (EDT)
- Congressional districts: 4th, 9th
- Website: www.morgancounty.in.gov
- Indiana county number 55

Morgan County is a county located in the U.S. state of Indiana. As of the 2020 United States census, the population was 71,780. The county seat (and only incorporated city) is Martinsville.

Morgan County is between Indianapolis, in Marion County, and Bloomington in Monroe County. It is included in the Indianapolis-Carmel-Anderson, IN Metropolitan Statistical Area. Two major highways, Interstate 69 and Indiana State Road 67, carry large numbers of daily commuters between the two larger communities. The county has 14 townships which provide local services.

== History ==
The future state of Indiana was first regulated by passage of the Northwest Ordinance in 1787. The governing structure created by this act was superposed over an area that was still largely contested with the country's natives, although they were being gradually pushed out of the area. In 1818, a series of treaties was concluded, resulting in the confinement of the Miami tribe to the reserve area and the removal of the Delaware tribe, who had dominated central and east central Indiana, to west of the Mississippi River by 1820, clearing the way for colonization. The area was called the Delaware New Purchase until it was divided into Wabash County in the northwest and Delaware County in the southeast on January 2, 1820. Those counties were soon after dissolved, and the areas came to be called the "Wabash New Purchase" and "Delaware New Purchase" (renamed the "Adams New Purchase" in 1827). Subsequently, 35 new counties (including Morgan, authorized on February 15, 1822) were carved out of the original area. It was named for Gen. Daniel Morgan, who defeated the British at the Battle of Cowpens in the Revolutionary War.

The first settlers arrived in Morgan County in 1822. They came mostly from southern states. The Mooresville area and surrounding communities received large numbers of southern Quakers, driven to migrate because of their opposition to slavery. Paul Hadley, a Mooresville resident, was the designer of the current Indiana flag, as well as a locally prominent water color artist in the early twentieth century.

In the late nineteenth and early twentieth centuries, mineral springs in Martinsville gave rise to several spas, and the nickname of the Martinsville High School athletic teams has subsequently been the Artesians.

County government took several steps forward in the 2000s, creating a new Plan Commission, re-instituting a county economic development organization, and establishing the county's first Park and Recreation Board between 2000 and 2004. Morgan County also was the first county in the metropolitan Indianapolis region to establish a smoking ban ordinance for restaurants, which came into effect in 2004.

=== Courthouse ===
The first building used for Morgan County courts was the log house of a pioneer. Work began in 1823 to build the first courthouse, a two-story log house. A brick courthouse replaced it in 1833.

The Morgan County courthouse was designed by Isaac Hodgson in the Italianate style. It was built from 1857 to 1859 by Perry M. Blankenship of Martinsville at a cost of $32,000. It was almost identical to Hodgson's Jennings County courthouse in Vernon, which was also begun in 1857, but the Martinsville building received an addition in the 1970s; the original section was also remodeled and renovated at that time. The building is of red brick with white stone quoins and has tall windows with round arches, arranged in pairs. It is one of the few remaining pre-Civil War courthouses.

== Geography ==
Morgan County is where the glaciers stopped their southward advance during the last ice age. As a result, the area has both flat areas and rolling hills, with the most diverse soil of any county in the United States. The extensive woodlands of the eighteenth century have been cleared on the county's flat areas, with agricultural or urban uses dominating. The county is significantly carved with wooded drainages, leading to the southwest-flowing White River. According to radar telemetry gathered by the US Shuttle Radar Topographic Mission, Morgan County terrain ranges from 604 to 1,010 feet (184 to 308 meters) ASL.

According to the 2010 census, the county has a total area of 409.43 square miles (1,060.4 km^{2}), of which 403.97 square miles (1,046.3 km^{2}) (or 98.67%) is land and 5.46 square miles (14.1 km^{2}) (or 1.33%) is water. Morgan County is bisected by the White River Valley; the community has taken an interest in recent years in protecting the river as an asset, seeking to develop parks and greenways along the White River and initiating an annual river cleanup day in the spring.

The county also is home to large areas of land that were not glaciated during the last ice age. The river valley and contributing watersheds, along with the non-glaciated hills, results in a topography unlike the rest of the metropolitan Indianapolis area. County residents are proud of the scenic terrain, and in recent years have established a county park system and a bike/pedestrian trail system plan to provide protection and access to the amenities. An annual five miles (8.0 km) run is held as a fundraiser for the path system endowment.

=== Adjacent counties ===
- Hendricks County (north)
- Marion County (northeast)
- Johnson County (east)
- Brown County (southeast)
- Monroe County (south)
- Owen County (southwest)
- Putnam County (northwest)

=== Major highways ===
- Interstate 69
- Interstate 70
- State Road 39
- State Road 42
- State Road 44
- State Road 67
- State Road 135
- State Road 142
- State Road 144
- State Road 252
- State Road 267

== Communities ==
=== City and towns ===
- Bethany
- Brooklyn
- Martinsville (city/county seat)
- Monrovia
- Mooresville
- Morgantown
- Paragon

=== Unincorporated places ===
- Adams
- Alaska
- Allman
- Banta
- Beech Grove
- Bluffs
- Brookmoor
- Camby (part)
- Center Valley
- Centerton
- Champlin Meadows
- Chetwynd
- Cope
- Crestview Heights
- Crown Center
- Eminence
- Exchange
- Fields
- Five Points
- Gasburg
- Hall
- Hyndsdale
- Lake Hart
- Landersdale
- Lewisville
- Little Point
- Mahalasville
- Maxwell
- Miller
- Mount Zion Corner
- Painted Hills (census-designated place)
- Plano
- Ridgewood
- Shelburne
- Stines Mill Corner
- Turkey Track
- Waverly
- Waverly Woods
- Whitaker
- Wilbur
- Willowbrook Estates
- Wiser
- Woodcrest
- Wolff
- Young

=== Townships ===
- Adams
- Ashland
- Baker
- Brown
- Clay
- Green
- Gregg
- Harrison
- Jackson
- Jefferson
- Madison
- Monroe
- Ray
- Washington

Morgan County

== Climate and weather ==
Martinsville, Indiana

Climate chart (precipitation, max. and min. temperature)
J	F	M	A	M	J	J	A	S	O	N	D
3.1 36 21	2.4 41 24	3.7 52 33	4.3 64 43	4.8 74 54	5 82 63	4.4 86 66	3.2 84 65	3.1 78 57	3.2 66 46	3.5 53 35	2.9 40 26
- █ Average max. and min. temperatures in °F
- █ Precipitation totals in inches
- Source: The Weather Channel
Metric conversion
J	F	M	A	M	J	J	A	S	O	N	D
79 2 −6	62 5 −4	94 11 1	110 18 6	121 23 12	126 28 17	112 30 19	81 29 18	80 26 14	82 19 8	88 12 2	74 4 −3
- █ Average max. and min. temperatures in °C
- █ Precipitation totals in mm

In recent years, average temperatures in Martinsville have ranged from a low of 18 °F (−8 °C) in January to a high of 85 °F (29 °C) in July, although a record low of −35 °F (−37 °C) was recorded in January 1994 and a record high of 105 °F (41 °C) was recorded in July 1954. Average monthly precipitation ranged from 2.44 inches (62 mm) in February to 4.73 inches (120 mm) in May.

== Government ==
The county government is a constitutional body granted specific powers by the Constitution of Indiana and the Indiana Code. The county council is the fiscal branch of the county government and controls spending and revenue collection. Four Council members are elected from county districts, and three are elected at-large by the entire county electorate. The council members serve four-year terms and are responsible for setting salaries, the annual budget and special spending. The council has limited authority to impose local taxes, in the form of optional income taxes and the property tax levy that is subject to state level approval, excise taxes and service taxes.

The executive body of the county; commissioners are elected county-wide to staggered four-year terms. One commissioner serves as president. The commissioners execute acts legislated by the council, collect revenue and manage the county government.

The county maintains a small claims court that handles civil cases. The judge on the court is elected to a term of four years and must be a member of the Indiana Bar Association. The judge is assisted by a constable who is elected to a four-year term. In some cases, court decisions can be appealed to the state level circuit court.

The county has other elected offices, including sheriff, coroner, auditor, treasurer, recorder, surveyor and circuit court clerk. These officers are elected to four-year terms. Members elected to county government positions are required to declare party affiliations and be residents of the county.

Each township has a trustee who administers rural fire protection and ambulance service, provides poor relief and manages cemetery care, among other duties. The trustee is assisted in these duties by a three-member township board. The trustees and board members are elected to four-year terms.

Morgan County is the southernmost county within Indiana's fourth district; the only intact county within Indiana Senate district 37; and is split between Indiana House of Representatives districts 57 and 60.

United States presidential election results for Morgan County, Indiana
Year	Republican		Democratic		Third party(ies)	
Year	No.	%	No.	%	No.	%
1888	2,500	53.58%	2,077	44.51%	89	1.91%
1892	2,377	51.28%	2,014	43.45%	244	5.26%
1896	2,688	52.23%	2,414	46.91%	44	0.86%
1900	2,904	51.38%	2,632	46.57%	116	2.05%
1904	3,119	54.12%	2,428	42.13%	216	3.75%
1908	3,074	50.98%	2,789	46.25%	167	2.77%
1912	1,353	24.23%	2,608	46.70%	1,623	29.07%
1916	2,860	50.06%	2,616	45.79%	237	4.15%
1920	5,634	55.95%	4,254	42.25%	181	1.80%
1924	5,328	55.58%	4,042	42.17%	216	2.25%
1928	5,464	57.76%	3,933	41.58%	63	0.67%
1932	4,825	44.70%	5,775	53.50%	195	1.81%
1936	5,793	51.14%	5,451	48.12%	84	0.74%
1940	6,613	57.29%	4,895	42.40%	36	0.31%
1944	6,115	59.09%	4,156	40.16%	77	0.74%
1948	5,677	55.13%	4,428	43.00%	192	1.86%
1952	8,222	62.90%	4,755	36.38%	95	0.73%
1956	8,318	63.48%	4,735	36.14%	50	0.38%
1960	9,416	63.36%	5,375	36.17%	69	0.46%
1964	8,347	54.10%	7,011	45.44%	70	0.45%
1968	8,944	55.45%	4,042	25.06%	3,144	19.49%
1972	11,980	77.62%	3,390	21.96%	65	0.42%
1976	10,983	59.99%	7,181	39.22%	145	0.79%
1980	13,321	68.53%	5,439	27.98%	678	3.49%
1984	14,884	75.91%	4,627	23.60%	96	0.49%
1988	14,284	72.38%	5,375	27.23%	77	0.39%
1992	10,939	51.83%	4,690	22.22%	5,478	25.95%
1996	12,872	59.60%	5,812	26.91%	2,912	13.48%
2000	15,286	69.37%	6,228	28.26%	522	2.37%
2004	19,197	73.75%	6,650	25.55%	182	0.70%
2008	18,129	62.92%	10,330	35.85%	352	1.22%
2012	19,591	69.17%	7,969	28.13%	765	2.70%
2016	23,674	75.28%	6,040	19.21%	1,732	5.51%
2020	27,512	75.96%	7,781	21.48%	928	2.56%
2024	26,965	76.12%	7,765	21.92%	693	1.96%

== Demographics ==
Historical population
Census	Pop.	Note	%±
1830	5,593		—
1840	10,741		92.0%
1850	14,576		35.7%
1860	16,110		10.5%
1870	17,528		8.8%
1880	18,900		7.8%
1890	18,643		−1.4%
1900	20,457		9.7%
1910	21,182		3.5%
1920	20,010		−5.5%
1930	19,424		−2.9%
1940	19,801		1.9%
1950	23,726		19.8%
1960	33,875		42.8%
1970	44,176		30.4%
1980	51,999		17.7%
1990	55,920		7.5%
2000	66,689		19.3%
2010	68,894		3.3%
2020	71,780		4.2%
2025 (est.)	74,967	▲	4.4%
US Decennial Census; 1790-1960 1900-1990; 1990-2000 2010

=== Racial and ethnic composition ===
Morgan County, Indiana – Racial and ethnic composition Note: the US Census treats Hispanic/Latino as an ethnic category. This table excludes Latinos from the racial categories and assigns them to a separate category. Hispanics/Latinos may be of any race.
Race / Ethnicity (NH = Non-Hispanic)	Pop 1980	Pop 1990	Pop 2000	Pop 2010	Pop 2020	% 1980	% 1990	% 2000	% 2010	% 2020
White alone (NH)	51,667	55,452	65,398	66,782	66,972	99.36%	99.16%	98.06%	96.93%	93.30%
Black or African American alone (NH)	8	9	50	175	339	0.02%	0.02%	0.07%	0.25%	0.47%
Native American or Alaska Native alone (NH)	42	136	141	177	195	0.08%	0.24%	0.21%	0.26%	0.27%
Asian alone (NH)	69	91	158	241	276	0.13%	0.16%	0.24%	0.35%	0.38%
Native Hawaiian or Pacific Islander alone (NH)	x	x	10	19	11	x	x	0.01%	0.03%	0.02%
Other race alone (NH)	19	4	20	30	178	0.04%	0.01%	0.03%	0.04%	0.25%
Mixed race or Multiracial (NH)	x	x	422	650	2,535	x	x	0.63%	0.94%	3.53%
Hispanic or Latino (any race)	194	228	490	820	1,274	0.37%	0.41%	0.73%	1.19%	1.77%
Total	51,999	55,920	66,689	68,894	71,780	100.00%	100.00%	100.00%	100.00%	100.00%

=== 2020 census ===
As of the 2020 census, the county had a population of 71,780. The median age was 43.0 years. 22.3% of residents were under the age of 18 and 18.4% of residents were 65 years of age or older. For every 100 females there were 100.1 males, and for every 100 females age 18 and over there were 98.2 males age 18 and over.

The racial makeup of the county was 93.9% White, 0.5% Black or African American, 0.3% American Indian and Alaska Native, 0.4% Asian, <0.1% Native Hawaiian and Pacific Islander, 0.6% from some other race, and 4.3% from two or more races. Hispanic or Latino residents of any race comprised 1.8% of the population.

45.9% of residents lived in urban areas, while 54.1% lived in rural areas.

There were 27,720 households in the county, of which 30.5% had children under the age of 18 living in them. Of all households, 56.1% were married-couple households, 15.9% were households with a male householder and no spouse or partner present, and 20.8% were households with a female householder and no spouse or partner present. About 22.5% of all households were made up of individuals and 10.4% had someone living alone who was 65 years of age or older.

There were 29,351 housing units, of which 5.6% were vacant. Among occupied housing units, 79.4% were owner-occupied and 20.6% were renter-occupied. The homeowner vacancy rate was 1.2% and the rental vacancy rate was 6.6%.

== 2010 Census ==
As of the 2010 United States census, there were 68,894 people, 25,765 households, and 19,355 families in the county. The population density was 170.5 inhabitants per square mile (65.8/km^{2}). There were 27,754 housing units at an average density of 68.7 per square mile (26.5/km^{2}). The racial makeup of the county was 97.7% white, 0.4% Asian, 0.3% American Indian, 0.3% black or African American, 0.3% from other races, and 1.0% from two or more races. Those of Hispanic or Latino origin made up 1.2% of the population. In terms of ancestry, 46% of people in Morgan County were of English ancestry, 22.1% were of German ancestry, and 10.3% were of Irish ancestry. Of the 25,765 households, 35.8% had children under the age of 18 living with them, 59.8% were married couples living together, 10.1% had a female householder with no husband present, 24.9% were non-families, and 20.3% of all households were made up of individuals. The average household size was 2.65 and the average family size was 3.04. The median age was 39.9 years.

The median income for a household in the county was $47,697 and the median income for a family was $62,507. Males had a median income of $48,457 versus $34,831 for females. The per capita income for the county was $23,972. About 7.2% of families and 10.1% of the population were below the poverty line, including 14.9% of those under age 18 and 6.8% of those age 65 or over.

== Education ==
Morgan County is served by the Morgan County Public Library, which operates six branches.

== See also ==
- National Register of Historic Places listings in Morgan County, Indiana
