= Foxcliff Estates, Indiana =

- Subdivision
- Location within Indiana Location within the United States
- Coordinates: 39°28′43″N 86°23′30″W
- Country: United States
- State: Indiana
- County: Morgan
- Township: Washington

Area
  - Total: 2.22 sq mi (5.7 km^{2})
  - Land: 2.06 sq mi (5.3 km^{2})
  - Water: 0.16 sq mi (0.41 km^{2})
- Elevation: 682 ft (208 m)
- Time zone: UTC-5 (Eastern (EST))
  - Summer (DST): UTC-4 (EDT)
- ZIP code: 46151 (Martinsville)
- Area code: 765
- GNIS feature ID: 2830473
- FIPS code: 18-25212

Foxcliff Estates is an unincorporated subdivision in Washington Township, Morgan County, Indiana, United States.

== Geography ==
Foxcliff Estates is in east-central Morgan County, 5 miles (8 km) northeast of Martinsville, the county seat, 11 miles (18 km) south of Mooresville, and 27 miles (43 km) southwest of downtown Indianapolis. The community is built around several small lakes and is centered on the Foxcliff Golf Club. Wooded hills rise nearly 200 feet (60 m) above the community to the west.

According to the U.S. Census Bureau, the CDP has a total area of 2.22 square miles (5.75 km^{2}), of which 2.06 square miles (5.3 km^{2}) are land and 0.16 square miles (0.41 km^{2}), or 7.29%, are water. The community is bordered to the east by Clear Creek and Grassy Fork, which flow north to the White River at the northern edge of the community.

== Demographics ==
The United States Census Bureau first delineated Foxcliff Estates as a census designated place in the 2022 American Community Survey.
