= Cross School =

- U.S. National Register of Historic Places
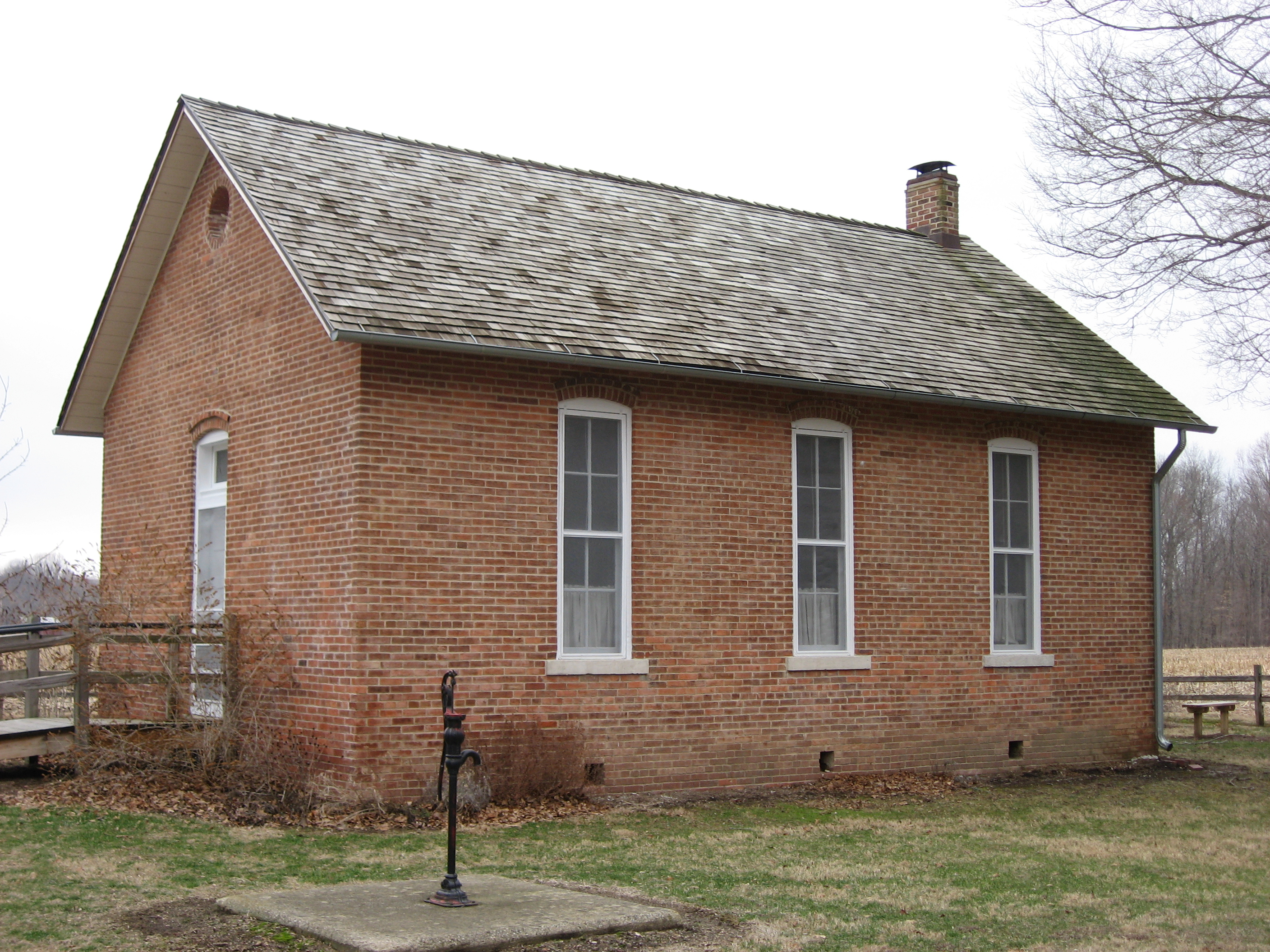
- Cross School, February 2011

- Location within Indiana Location within the United States
- Location: Voiles and Townsend Rds., southeast of Martinsville, Indiana
- Coordinates: 39°23′27″N 86°22′53″W
- Area: 0.5 acres (0.20 ha)
- Built: 1854
- NRHP reference No.: 83000142
- Added to NRHP: June 16, 1983

Cross School is a historic one-room school building located in Washington Township, Morgan County, Indiana. It was built in 1856, and is a simple one-story, rectangular, brick building with a gable roof. It features segmental arched openings. It operated as a rural school until 1941, then housed a Sunday school for 25 years. It was restored in 1976

It was listed on the National Register of Historic Places in 1983.
