= Morgan County Library =

Morgan County Library may refer to:

- Morgan County Public Library in Martinsville, Indiana
- Morgan Library & Museum in Manhattan, New York City
- The Morgan County Library, part of the Azalea Regional Library System
