= Martinsville station =

- Martinsville Vandalia Depot
- U.S. National Register of Historic Places
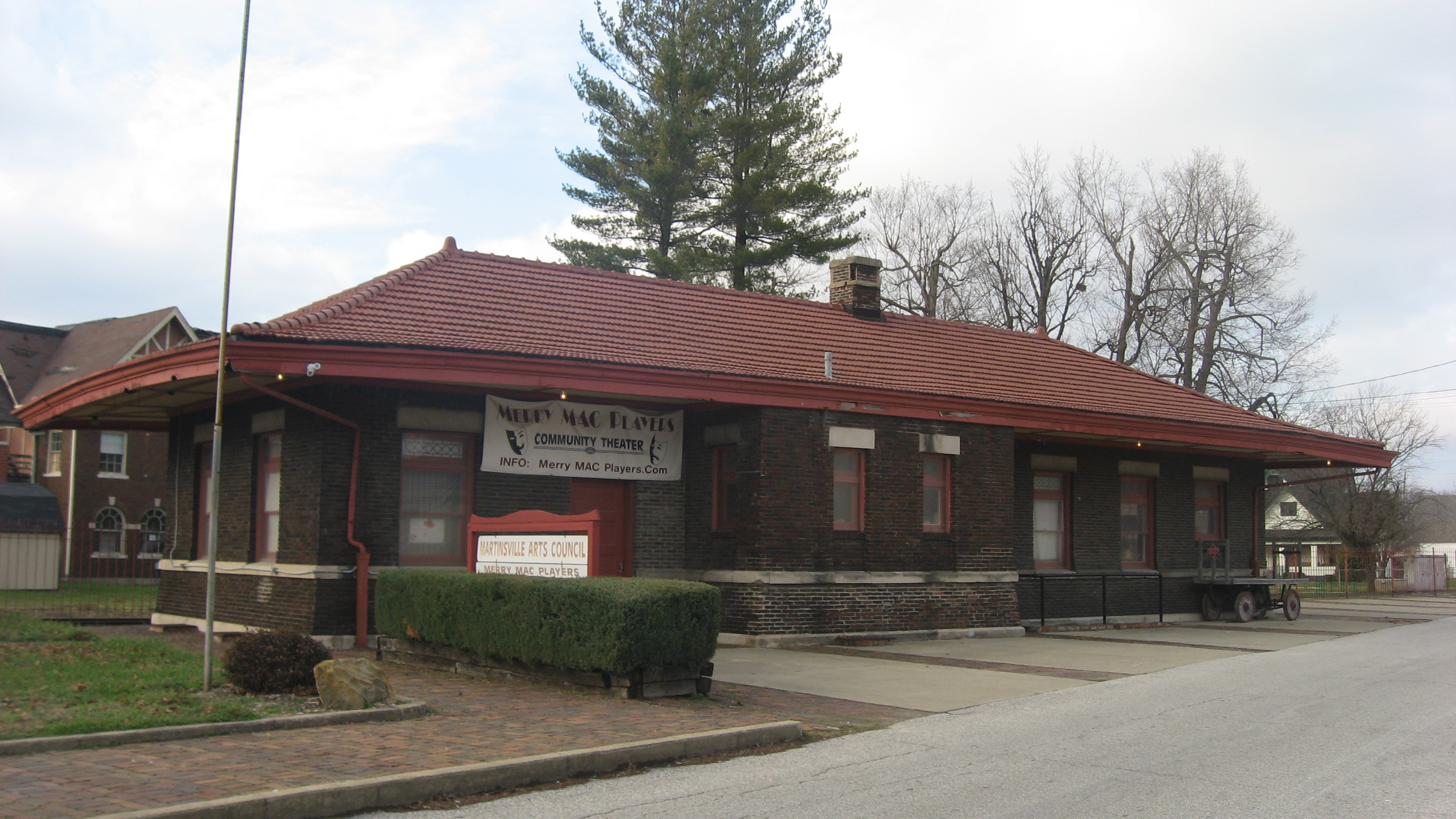
- Martinsville Vandalia Depot, December 2011

- Location within Indiana Location within the United States
- Location: 210 N. Marion St., Martinsville, Indiana
- Coordinates: 39°25′44″N 86°25′53″W
- Area: less than one acre
- Built: 1911
- Architect: Prather, James; Duncan, Charles
- Architectural style: Bungalow/craftsman
- NRHP reference No.: 91000268
- Added to NRHP: March 14, 1991

Martinsville, also known as the Indianapolis and Vincennes Railroad Depot, is a historic train station located at Martinsville, Indiana. It was built by the Indianapolis and Vincennes Railroad in 1911, and is a one-story, rectangular, Bungalow/American Craftsman style brick building. It has a bellcast red clay tile hipped roof and measures 24 feet by 75 feet. Passenger service on the line ended in 1940, and the building was subsequently used as a freight depot. The building faces the Martinsville Sanitarium. The building housed the Martinsville Chamber of Commerce and currently houses the Martinsville Arts Council.

It has been listed on the National Register of Historic Places in 1991 (#91000268) as the Martinsville Vandalia Depot.

Preceding station	Pennsylvania Railroad	Following station
Casey toward St. Louis	St. Louis – Pittsburgh	Homer toward Pittsburgh
