= 4th Infantry Regiment (United States) =

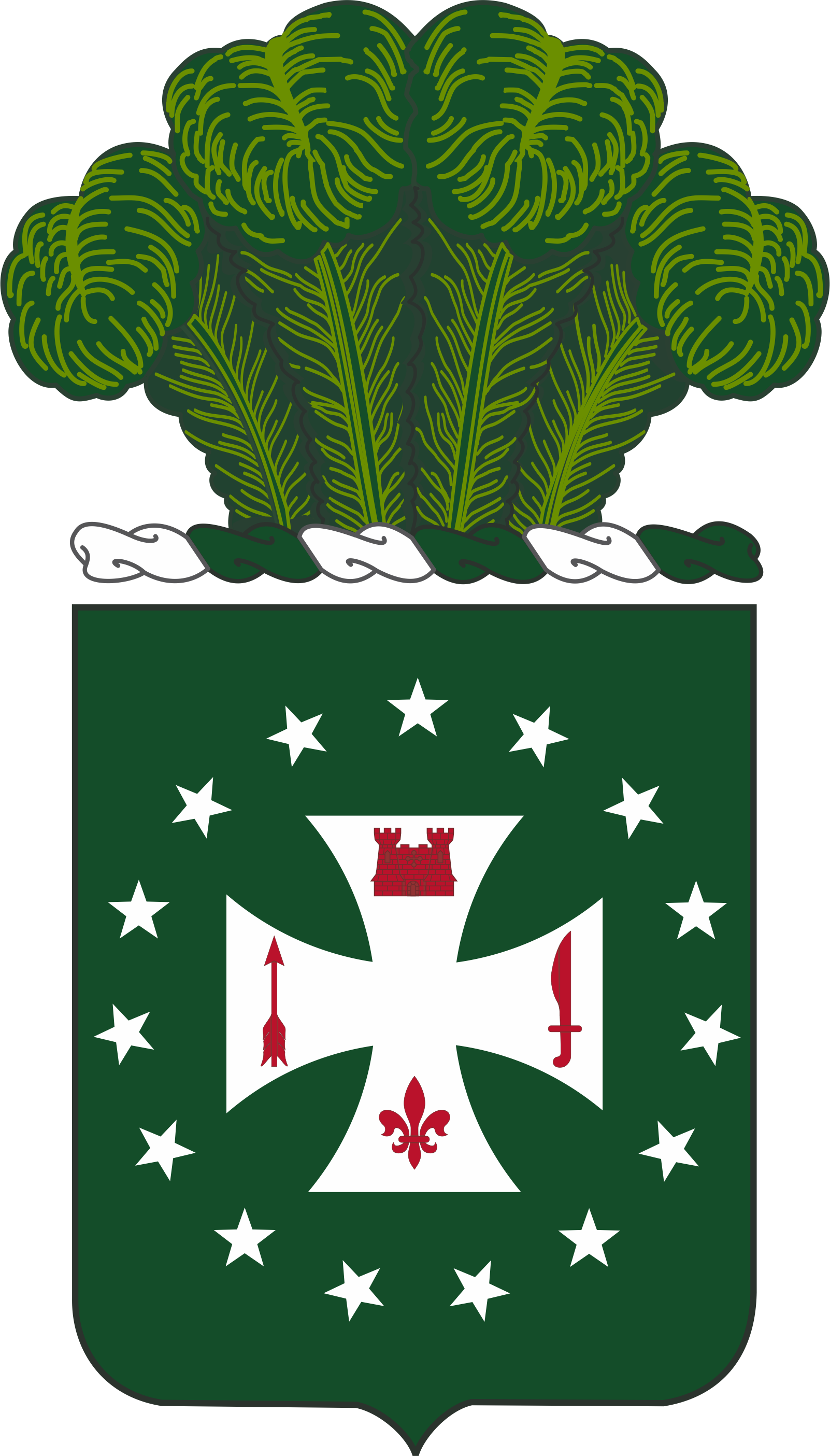
- 4th Infantry Regiment coat of arms
- Active: 1812–1947; 1948–present
- Country: United States
- Branch: United States Army
- Type: Infantry
- Size: Three battalions
- Garrison/HQ: 1st Battalion: Hohenfels, Germany; 2nd Battalion: Fort Polk, Louisiana; 3rd Battalion: Baumholder, Germany (July 2009)
- Nickname: Warriors
- Mottos: "Noli Me Tangere"; Don't Tread on Me
- Colors: Blue and white
- Engagements: Tecumseh's War; Battle of Tippecanoe; Creek War; Seminole Wars; Battle of Negro Fort; Dade Battle; Battle of Lake Okeechobee; Black Hawk War; Rogue River Wars; Yakima War; Puget Sound War; Battle of Seattle; War of 1812; Battle of River Canard; Siege of Detroit; Battle of Craney Island; Battle of Plattsburgh; Mexican War; Battle of Palo Alto; Battle of Resaca de la Palma; Battle of Monterey; Pig War; American Civil War; Battle of Yorktown; Battle of Gaines Mill; Second Battle of Bull Run; Battle of Antietam; Battle of Fredericksburg; Battle of Chancellorsville; Battle of Gettysburg; Battle of the Wilderness; Battle of Spotsylvania Court House; Battle of Cold Harbor; Siege of Petersburg; Sioux Wars; Fort Reno Skirmish; Battle of Prairie Dog Creek; Battle of Rosebud; Meeker massacre; Spanish-American War; Battle of El Caney; Siege of Santiago; Filipino War; World War I; Western Front; World War II; War on terror; Iraq War; War in Afghanistan (2001–2021)
- Decorations: French Croix de Guerre with Gilt Star; Army Superior Unit Award

Commanders
- Notable commanders: Andrew Jackson; William Henry Harrison; Ulysses S. Grant; George Wright; Christopher C. Augur; George Crook; James M. J. Sanno; Everard Enos Hatch; Charles Gerhardt; Halstead Dorey; Charles C. Ballou; Ira C. Welborn; George S. Clarke

Insignia
- Distinctive unit insignia

The 4th Infantry Regiment is an infantry regiment in the United States Army. Its origins date to at least 1808.

== History ==
=== Previous 4th Infantry Regiments ===
The Infantry of the Fourth Sub-Legion was organized on 4 September 1792, and fought at Miami Rapids in 1794. In 1796, it was re-designated the Fourth Regiment of the Infantry. After ten years, due to a reduction of the army, the regiment was disbanded in 1802. This Fourth Infantry was a temporary unit with no lineal connection to either the original permanent 4th Infantry Regiment, or the modern 4th Infantry Regiment.

==== Tecumseh's War ====
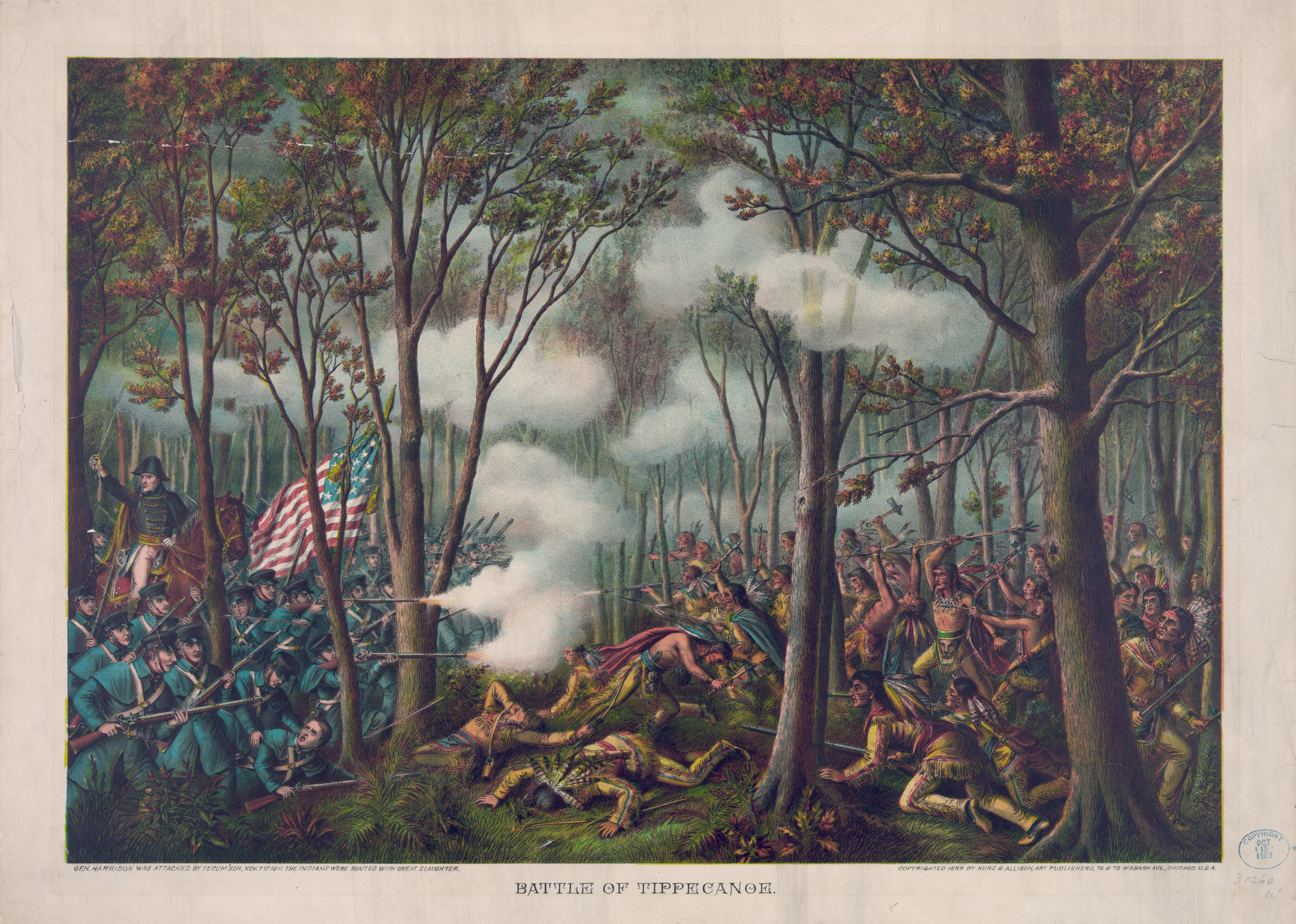
An illustration of the Battle of Tippecanoe, which the regiment participated in.

In 1808, the Regular Army was reorganized to counter the increasing levels of resistance to colonization by Indian tribes living on the American frontier. The first permanent Regular Army unit to bear the designation of 4th Infantry Regiment was constituted on 12 April 1808 in the Regular Army, and organized from May to June of that year in New England. Led by General William Henry Harrison, the 4th Infantry, commanded by Colonel John Parker Boyd, was ordered to the Northwest Territory, which included modern-day Ohio, Indiana, and Illinois. Its mission was to defeat Tecumseh's confederacy, a pan-tribal confederation determined to resist the U.S. invasion of indigenous lands as part of a conflict which had raged since 1810; defeating the confederation would allow for white settlers to colonize the region without facing indigenous resistance.

Harrison, who would go on to serve as President of the United States, led a force consisting of the 4th Infantry supplemented by militiamen and volunteers against the Confederacy at the Battle of Tippecanoe. During the battle, the U.S. troops routed their Native opponents, killing up to 80 Native Americans while suffering 188 casualties. Harrison then ordered his force to loot and burn the Shawnee settlement of Prophetstown. The regiment subsequently returned to Fort Vincennes, and in 1812, after marching through Ohio, joined forces with General William Hull.

=== War of 1812 ===
Within months of the Battle of Tippecanoe, the United States declared war against Great Britain. This required the increased manning of the Regular Army.

The modern 4th Infantry Regiment was constituted 11 January 1812 in the Regular Army as the original 14th Infantry Regiment, and organized in March 1812 in Virginia, Maryland, Delaware, and Pennsylvania.

On 12 July, General Hull crossed with his command into Canada (then British North America), and made camp at Sandwich (now Windsor), Canada, just on the Canada–US border. The regiment remained inactive for the rest of the month and grew restless. Then the Fourth was given a mission of escorting some supplies to Fort Detroit, Michigan, previous escorts having been surprised and routed. The Fourth Infantry, led by Captain Cook, undertook this duty enthusiastically, and although ambushed at the Battle of Maguaga, 14 miles below Detroit, by a superior force comprising British (both regular and colonial) forces and Indians, the US regulars captured the enemy's concealed breastworks, wounded Chief Tecumseh, and completely routed their opponents.

Before they could follow up on their success and complete the victory, the Fourth received orders from General Hull to return to Fort Detroit. There, Cook and the Fourth were advised that on 16 August 1812, General Hull had surrendered his entire force, including the Fourth, to Lieutenant Bullock of the British 41st Regiment. For this General Hull was tried and found guilty of "Cowardliness" and "Neglect of Duty". President Monroe, mitigating the court-martial sentence that General Hull be shot, ruled: "The rolls of the army shall no longer be debased by having upon them the name of Brigadier General Hull". The Fourth Infantry's colors, taken by the British at the surrender ordered by Hull, were kept in the Tower of London until 1889, then the colors for many years hung in the Chapel of the Royal Hospital Chelsea until 1961. Along the walls of the Great Hall are replicas (the original are in the museum). They are currently in the Welch Regiment Museum.

After remaining several months in Canada as prisoners of war, the officers and men were returned under parole to Boston and given furloughs until exchanged for British prisoners of war. Early in 1813 the exchange was effective and the regiment reassembled and recruited to strength. It fought at the second Battle of Lacolle Mills, Canada and at Plattsburgh in 1814. These actions give the 4th Infantry campaign credit for the War of 1812.

Following the end of the War of 1812, and consistent with the reduction in force of the Regular Army, the original 4th Infantry Regiment was consolidated on May–October 1815 with the 9th and 13th Infantry (both constituted 11 January 1812), the 21st Infantry (constituted 26 June 1812), the 40th Infantry (constituted 29 January 1813), and the 46th Infantry (constituted 30 March 1814) to form the 5th Infantry Regiment. Thereafter separate lineage.

In the same time period the 14th Infantry Regiment was consolidated May–October 1815 with the 18th Infantry Regiment and 20th Infantry Regiment (both constituted 11 January 1812) and the 36th Infantry Regiment and 38th Infantry Regiment (both constituted 29 January 1813) to form the modern 4th Infantry Regiment. On 21 August 1816 unspecified 4th Infantry Regiment companies were redesignated as Companies A and B, 4th Infantry Regiment. These companies would later be instrumental in the reorganization of 4th Infantry Regiment from the original organizational model, which included a headquarters element and 10 lettered companies with no battalion organization. The original Companies A and B would become Headquarters and Headquarters Company 1st and Headquarters and Headquarters Company 2nd Battalion.

=== Negro Fort ===
In 1814, British forces constructed a fortification in the Apalachicola Forest as part of a failed invasion of Gulf Coast of the United States. During their occupation of the fort, the British military offered sanctuary to fugitive American slaves along with Muscogee and Seminole tribesmen resisting U.S. expansion. After the British withdrew in 1815, they left the fort, subsequently nicknamed "Negro Fort" by Americans, in the control of their Black and Indian allies. As the fort served as a symbol of resistance to American slavery and attracted runaway slaves, Southern plantation owners demanded the fort's destruction. Responding to these calls, Andrew Jackson ordered U.S. Army officers Edmund P. Gaines and Duncan Lamont Clinch to carry out an illegal invasion of Spanish Florida and destroy the fort. Leading a battalion of the 4th Infantry Regiment and 2 U.S. Navy gunboats, Gaines and Clinch invaded Spanish Florida without Congressional approval and destroyed the fort after a lucky shot destroyed the fort's powder magazine. Most survivors of the explosion were escorted by the 4th Infantry Regiment back into slavery in Georgia, with one being summarily executed by an army firing squad.

=== Creek and Seminole Campaigns ===
For the next twenty years, the regiment fought almost constantly with the Creek Indians in Georgia, and the Seminoles in Florida under the command of General Andrew Jackson, a future president. In constant and long hardships the regiment marched through swamps, building cantonments and raking roads to open what now is the state of Georgia, Alabama, and Florida. A letter of Gen. Lorenzo Thomas stated: "Each company built its own double block of logs and a house of one story for the officers quarters. The troops also saved the boards for flooring, and rived the pine shingles for roofs. In truth, the troops did the entire work, the quartermaster department only furnishing the few tools to work with, such as nails and other hardware. Scarcely a nail was used to secure the shingles, they being hung on the rafters with wooden pegs. The spaces between the logs were chinked with moss and clay and afterward the whole was whitewashed. All completed with scarcely any expense to the government."

In December 1835, Osceola's Seminoles cut the line of communication and supply to one of the border stations, Fort King. One hundred artillerymen from Fort Brooke under Major Gardner were ordered to re-establish the contact. At the last moment, Major Gardner's bride of a few weeks fell ill. Captain and Brevet-Major Francis L. Dade of the Fourth Infantry took command for Major Gardner. Dade joined the expedition with eleven men of B Company, Fourth Infantry. The march was begun on 20 December; on 28 December, forty miles short of Fort King, Major Dade's column was ambushed by Osceola. The only survivors of the attack were three badly wounded privates who reported the command had fought stubbornly from eight in the morning until five at night when, their ammunition exhausted, they were killed. Those who died or were wounded were: Francis L. Dade, Brevet Maj., Pvt. John Barnes, Pvt. Donald Campbell, Pvt. Marvin Cunningham, Pvt. John Doughty, Pvt. Cornel Donovan, Pvt. William Downes, Pvt. Enoch Yates, Pvt. Samuel Hall, Pvt. Wiley Jones, Pvt. John Massacre, suffering some casualties: Pvt. David Hill was killed at Fort Call on 21 August 1836, Pvt. David Mclaughlin and Pvt. William Walker were killed at Thonotosassa on 26 August 1836, Sgt. Levi Clendening was killed at Chrystal River on 9 February 1837. Pvt. Othiel Lutz, Pvt. John Stewart, and Pvt. Barthol Shumard were all killed at the Battle of Lake Okeechobee on 25 December 1837. Lt. Robert C. Buchanan was also wounded at the Battle of Lake Okeechobee. Pvt. William Foster was killed at Big Cypress on 20 December 1841.

The death roll of one company for one year includes casualties from the Indians, cholera, and five diagnosed types of fever. The same death roll has the entry "Intemperance" after two more soldier's names. In Orders No. 15, Western Army, 28 August 1832, General Winfield Scott states:

"In addition to the foregoing, the senior surgeon present recommends the use of flannel shirts, flannel drawers, and woolen stockings; but the commanding general, who has seen much of disease, knows that it is intemperance which, in the present state of the atmosphere, generates and spreads the calamity, and that when once spread, good and temperate men are likely to take the infection. "He, therefore, peremptorily commands that every soldier or ranger who shall be found drunk or sensibly intoxicated after the publication of this order be compelled, as soon as his strength will permit, to dig a grave at a suitable burying-place, large enough for his own reception, as such grave cannot fail soon to be wanted for the drunken man himself or some drunken companion. This order is given as well to serve for the punishment of drunkenness as to spare good and temperate men the labor of digging graves for their worthless companions."

=== Mexican–American War ===
In 1842, the regiment was ordered to Jefferson Barracks, Missouri, where after half a century of existence the regiment enjoyed for the first time the comforts of a regular post. The regiment trained at Jefferson barracks for two years when in 1844, it was ordered to the western border of Louisiana for the war with Mexico. Hostilities were precipitated by the murder of Colonel Cross and the killing of a lieutenant with a small detachment of 4th Infantry soldiers by Mexican raiders. Although this happened in April, communications were slow and it was not until September that the command sailed to Corpus Christi, Texas, where with the 3rd, 5th, 7th and 8th Infantry regiments, one artillery regiment acting as infantry, seven companies of dragoons, and four companies of light artillery formed the Army of Observation under General Zachary Taylor. The pay was seven dollars a month and flogging was the usual means of punishment. U.S. Grant, then a lieutenant in the 4th Infantry, stated in his personal memoir: "A more efficient army for its number and armament, I do not believe ever fought a battle than the one commanded by General Taylor in his first two engagements on Mexican--or Texan soil".

The Army of Observation soon became the Army of Occupation. On the fields of Palo Alto, Resaca De La Palra, and at Monterey, where the regimental band of the Fourth threw away their instruments, seized a Mexican light battery, and swung it about upon their fleeing enemy. According to the official citation, the breast cord of honor given them and their successors was red, the artillery's color, to show that they were expert artillerymen as infantrymen. General Taylor had in his command leaders such as Lieutenant Ulysses S. Grant and Captain Robert E. Lee serving as a company commander of engineers. These battles had a great influence in molding the leaders of the American Civil War, which followed.

General Taylor having successfully invaded Northern Mexico moved the base of active operations to Vera Cruz on the east coast. In January 1847, the 4th Infantry was taken by sea to the port of Vera Cruz and after a siege, the city capitulated. General Scott commanding the Army at Vera Cruz ordered the advance on the capital, Mexico City, in April. On 17 April and 18th General Scott's forces moved through the mountain pass at Gerro Gordo, where General Santa Anna lost his wooden leg in a hasty retreat. The Mexican soldiers fought well and the pass was won only after desperate attacks.

=== Garrison duty ===
At the finish of the war the 4th Infantry left from Vera Cruz, and reached Camp Jeff Davis, Pascagoula, Mississippi, on 23 July 1848. The regiment was ordered to proceed by sea to New York and to take station at several different points on the lakes, between Mackinac and Plattsburgh. Ordinary garrison duties were performed until June 1852.

The regiment was consolidated at Fort Columbus, New York, to board the SS Ohio and travel to Aspinwall, on the Isthmus of Panama on 5 July 1852. Their mission was to travel across the Isthmus of Panama and set up camp on the Pacific coast to protect early settlers of the Pacific Northwest. After a long journey on the overcrowded ship (1,100 officers, men and camp followers) the regiment safely reached Aspinwall on 16 July 1852. The rainy season was at its height on the Isthmus and cholera was raging. Transportation was lacking for the trip across the Isthmus of Panama, the jungles, mountains, and rivers were difficult to cross; and cholera decimated the organization as well as the families who accompanied the men. The total deaths from cholera, fever, and allied diseases from the time the regiment arrived on the Isthmus to a few weeks after the arrival at Benicia on the west coast, amounted to one officer and 106 enlisted men.

On arrival on the Pacific coast, the regiment was distributed among many small posts. Vancouver Barracks, Fort Townsend, Fort Hoskins, Fort Humboldt, Fort Dalles, Fort Steilacoom, Fort Jones, Fort Boise, Fort Lane, Fort Reading, Fort Yamhill, Orford, Fort Walla Walla, Crook, Fort Ter-Waw, Fort Cascades, Fort Simcoe, Fort Gaston, Chehalis, Fort Yuma, and Fort Mohave were all garrisoned and many of them built by the 4th Infantry at some time between 1852 and 1861.

Major Granville O. Haller of the 4th Infantry led an expedition from Fort Dalles into central Washington, and Lieutenant William A. Slaughter also of the 4th Infantry with forty-eight men from Fort Steilacoom crossed Natchez Pass to aid Major Haller when attempts to move the Indians of Puget Sound onto reservations caused trouble between them and some white settlers. Captain Maloney of the 4th Infantry, and Captain Gilmore Hayes of the Washington Volunteers had started for Yakima via Natchez Pass when they were overtaken on 29 October 1855 by the Nisqually tribe under Chief Leschi. Lt. Slaughter and his men plus Captain Hayes' force met the Indians at the crossing of the White River, and on 4 November 1855 fought without decisive results. The following day the troops met hostiles in the difficult country between the White and Green Rivers. The troops fell back into the valleys and on 24 November 1855, Lt. Slaughter, commanding a platoon of the 4th Infantry and a company of volunteers, was attacked in his camp at Puyallup. The lieutenant moved to the present site of Auburn and here again the Indians attacked. Slaughter and two corporals of the volunteer company were killed, four other men were injured, one later dying of his wounds. For years the town, which sprang up on this site, was known as Slaughter in honor of this officer of the 4th Infantry; it was later changed to Auburn.

During the hostilities many settlers had taken refuge at Fort Steilacoom, the woman and children being left there, while the men enrolled in the volunteers. Ezar Meeker, one of the settlers, paid the following tribute to First Lieutenant John Nugen of the Fourth Infantry, commanding Fort Steilacoom while Captain Maloney was in the field.

It would be a pleasure, could I but know he was alive, to even yet thank that kind and considerate gentleman, Lieutenant Nugen, for his forbearance and energetic efforts to contribute to the safety and comfort of the panic stricken citizens. It is a source of deep gratification even at so late a day to bear this testimony to his memory, if perchance he may have passed to the beyond. By improvising some temporary quarters for his forces, most of whom, however, were placed on guard duty, room was provided in the soldier's barracks for the woman and children, while the men were placed on guard with what few soldiers were left."

Hostile tribes attacked Seattle on 26 January 1856, and two settlers were killed. Meanwhile, the regular forces were augmented by additional companies of the 4th Infantry from Vancouver Barracks and by three companies of the 9th Infantry. On 12 February 1856, they moved from Fort Steilacoom and were joined by Chief Patkanim with friendly Indians. This force advanced against the hostiles at Muckleshoot, losing one man and nine wounded, in a second battle on the White River overrunning the Indian encampment. Leshi retreated through Natches Pass and surrendered to Colonel. Wright, the commanding officer of the 4th Infantry, who had been conducting a vigorous campaign against the Yakima Indians and their allies, while the action in the west was occurring. By the close of the Leschi War, the 4th Infantry included in its present and past roster of officers such as Robert C. Buchanan, Christopher C. Augur, Alden, William Wallace Smith Bliss, Ulysses S. Grant, Philip Sheridan, Henry M. Judah, DeLancey Floyd-Jones, R.N. Scott, Lewis Cass Hunt, Granville O. Haller, Henry C. Hodges, Waller, David Allen Russell, Henry Prince, Benjamin Alvord, August Kautz, Robert Macfeely and George Crook. Many of these officers would later serve in the American Civil War.

In 1859, General William S. Harney ordered the occupation of San Juan Island as part of the territory of the United States. Three companies of the Fourth Infantry and one of the Ninth, under the command of Captain George Pickett, did the occupying. The British commander had under his command five men-of-war with 167 guns, and 2,000 sailors and marines. The British invited an officer of the Fourth to an official party of courtesy aboard the flagship. The American made a remark concerning a battle in the ongoing Second Italian War of Independence. It was September 1859; Magenta had been fought 4 June. The British, thus believed the Americans had more current information. With the memory of Pakenham's losses at New Orleans (in a battle fought after the war was ended) fresh in their minds, the British decided to wait. As it happened, the English commander was really the best informed man on the scene, as was proved by the subsequent arrival of General Winfield Scott with orders which vetoed General Harney's decision. The San Juan troops were quietly withdrawn, without bloodshed.

This incident in Puget Sound is called the Pig War.

=== Civil War ===
In 1861 with the secession of a number of Southern states to form the new Confederate States of America, the regiment moved from its dispersed posts in the Department of the Pacific to Southern California to suppress any secessionist uprising. Charged with the supervision of Los Angeles, San Bernardino, San Diego, and Santa Barbara Counties, on 14 August 1861, Major William Scott Ketchum made a rapid march on 26 August and encamped near San Bernardino, California, with Companies D and G, later reinforced at the beginning of September by a detachment of ninety First U.S. Dragoons and a howitzer. Except for frequent sniping at his camp, this move stifled a secessionist uprising and prevented secessionist political demonstrations during the September California gubernatorial elections in San Bernardino County.

In late October 1861 the regiment was relieved by California Volunteer units and marched to San Pedro harbor where they waited for the balance of the regiment to gather before being transported to Washington D.C. to become part of the garrison in defense of the capital. The regiment was organized with other Regular Army units in the Volunteer Army as the First Brigade of George Sykes's "Regular Division" of the V Corps. The regiment's first Civil War engagement was in April and May 1862 during the Siege of Yorktown. By quick action at the Battle of Gaines Mill in June 1862, the Regulars saved Wood's and Tidball's artillery batteries from capture by Confederate infantry.

It participated as a part of the Army of the Potomac in the Second Battle of Bull Run and then the subsequent Maryland Campaign. At the Battle of Antietam, the regulars held the Middle Bridge over Antietam Creek, guarding the vital passage. They advanced towards the Confederate-held town of Sharpsburg, Maryland, late in the afternoon of 17 September 1862, before being recalled to their lines.

After seeing limited action at the Battle of Fredericksburg in December 1862, the regiment went into winter camp and saw no further combat for months. It formed part of Joseph Hooker's rear guard at Chancellorsville. Throughout the Gettysburg campaign, the regiment served in the Regular Division under its newly promoted commander, Romeyn B. Ayres. During the Battle of Gettysburg, it was part of the fighting on the Second Day, helping push back Confederate infantry near Devil's Den and the Wheatfield.

Heavily depleted by battle casualties, the much-reduced regiment nevertheless continued to participate in the major campaigns of the Army of the Potomac, by 1864 under the command of Ulysses S. Grant during the Overland Campaign. The remaining men participated in the battles of Wilderness, Spotsylvania Court House, Cold Harbor, and the Siege of Petersburg. By the time the regiment manned the breastworks around Petersburg, a lieutenant, George Randall, was in command as the senior officer still present for duty.

On 22 June 1864, with less than 150 men left, the 4th Infantry reported to City Point, Virginia, to become Gen. Ulysses S. Grant's headquarters guard. The greatly reduced regiment was present at Appomattox Courthouse for Robert E. Lee's surrender. Grant, then commanding the armies of the Union, never forgot the 4th Infantry, with which he had served as a lieutenant in Mexico and on the frontier. As recognition of its valor during the Civil War, he designated it as the guard unit during the formal surrender ceremony.

Survivors of the 4th U.S. Infantry marched in the grand review of troops in Washington D.C. in May 1865, immediately following the war.

=== Post–Civil War ===
After the Civil War, the regiment returned to the West, now to Fort Laramie, Wyoming Territory in 1866. In 1867 the 4th Infantry built Fort Fetterman near present-day Douglas, Wyoming, completing it in July, garrisoning it, and making the new fort the regiment's headquarters. On 31 March 1869 the 4th Infantry was consolidated with the original 30th United States Infantry Regiment, and the resulting consolidation retained the 4th Infantry's designation. Companies A and B of each organization were carefully blended together to retain their original status.

On 9 December 1869, Private Jonathan Schewen of the regiment was killed in an Indian attack at the Horse River, in Wyoming Territory, and in 1871, a detachment of the 4th Infantry was sent to Louisville, Kentucky and split into small groups to chivvy moonshiners in Kentucky until 1872. On 4 March 1876, Sergeant Patrick Sullivan of the 4th was ambushed and murdered by outlaws at Fort Fetterman. In March 1876, Companies C, and I of the 4th Infantry accompanied Brigadier General George R. Crook's Big Horn Expedition, and on 5 March 1876, participated in the Fort Reno Skirmish near the abandoned Fort Reno, in Wyoming Territory.

In May and June 1876, Companies D, and F of the 4th Infantry Regiment were with General Crook's southern column and fought at the Battle of Prairie Dog Creek on 10 June 1876, and at the Battle of the Rosebud on 17 June 1876, where Crook ordered the five Infantry companies that were present to advance to bluffs overlooking Rosebud Creek in support of his Indian scouts. The men of Company D, 4th Infantry, under Captain Avery B. Cain, were first to reach the crest of the ridge north of the Rosebud, where they opened fire. Company F, of the 4th Infantry, and Companies C, G, and H, of the 9th United States Infantry Regiment, supported Company D's charge. The success of these five Infantry companies was critical to the outcome of the Battle of the Rosebud. Their enhanced firepower kept the Sioux and Cheyenne warriors at bay, while soldiers of the 2nd United States Cavalry Regiment, and 3rd United States Cavalry Regiment fought in support.

On 29 September 1879, Major Thomas T. Thornburgh of the 4th Infantry, and 12 other soldiers were killed by Indians in the Meeker massacre at the Milk River, in Colorado.

In 1892 and 1893, the 4th Infantry under the command of Colonel Robert Hall escorted Coxey's Army through Washington and Idaho to guard the Northern Pacific Railway from Coxey's men.

=== Spanish–American War, Philippine–American War years ===
In 1898, the Fourth went east and embarked from Tampa to Cuba on the steamer "Concho". Landing at Daiquiri, the regiment participated in the Battle of El Caney and the occupation of Santiago. Fever decimated the command and the campaign ended.

The Fourth returned to New York in August 1898. Quickly recruited at Fort Sheridan, the regiment sailed in January 1899 for Manila via the Suez Canal.

In March 1899 the Infantry regiments were reorganized with twelve, rather than the traditional ten, line companies. The twelve companies were organized into three four company battalions, each commanded by a major.

The Fourth Infantry, or units of it, participated in fights of La Loma church, Wariquima, Dismarinias, Imus, Puento Julien, and elsewhere in the Philippines, finally capturing Lt. General Trias, second in command to Aquinaldo. On 20 November 1899, Private John C. Wetherby, Co. L, 4th Infantry, was near Imus, Luzon, Philippines when he was wounded carrying important orders on the battlefield, unable to walk, he crawled a great distance in order to deliver his orders. Private Wetherby received the Medal of Honor for his actions.

On 2 July 1901, 2Lt Allen J. Greer of the 4th Infantry was near Majada, Laguna Province, Philippines when he charged alone an insurgent outpost with his pistol, killing one, wounding two, and capturing three insurgents with their rifles and equipment. For his actions, 2Lt. Greer received the Medal of Honor.

On 23 November 1901, 1LT. Louis J. Van Schaick, was pursuing a band of insurgents, near Nasugbu, Batangas, Philippines, and was the first to emerge from a canyon, and seeing a column of insurgents and fearing they might turn and attack his men as they emerged one by one from the canyon, galloped forward and closed with the insurgents, thereby throwing them into confusion until the arrival of others of the detachment. 1Lt. Van Schaick received the Medal of Honor for his actions.

In 1902, the regiment returned to San Francisco, having circled the globe.

The regiment returned to the Philippines for another tour from 1903 until 1906.

In October 1906 the regiment moved to Wyoming in time to stop the Ute uprising, its last campaign against hostile Indians.

In 1908, the regiment was ordered to the Philippines for a third time, remaining until 1910.

Trouble with Mexico caused the regiment to be stationed on the Texas border in 1913. On 1 January 1914 the regiment was at Galveston, Texas, as part of the 5th Brigade, 2nd Division where it had been since February 1913. The regiment was in Houston for 21 April parade commemorating the Battle of San Jacinto when it received orders on 20 April to return to Galveston where it embarked on the Army transport USAT Sumner on 24 April bound for Veracruz arriving 28 April to relieve Navy occupation forces. The regiment camped at Los Cocos Station, practically the same ground it had occupied in the U.S.-Mexican War of 1847, sixty-seven years before. Pvt. Herman C. Moore, 4th Infantry Regiment was killed during this conflict in October 1915.

=== World War I ===
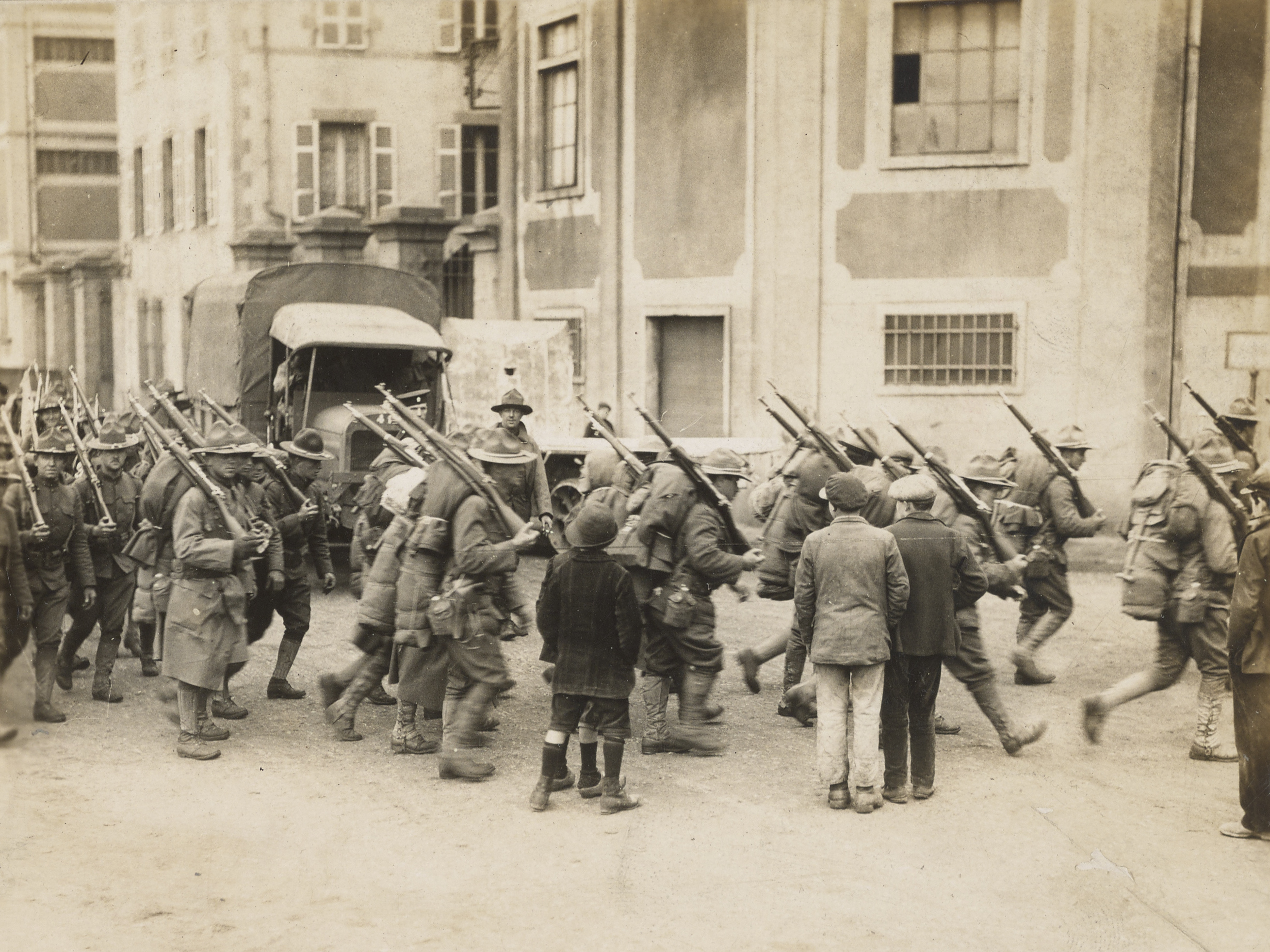
Doughboys of the 4th Infantry Regiment, 3rd Division, arriving at Brest, France, April 18, 1918.

In 1917, the United States entered World War I. On 1 October 1917, the Fourth was assigned to the 3rd Infantry Division. Stationed at Fort Brown, Texas, the regiment recruited and trained up to strength and on the first anniversary of the American entry into the war, left for France. The Fourth Infantry disembarked at Brest, France in 1918 and participated in the defensive actions of Aisne, Château-Thierry, Second Battle of the Marne, and in the Third Battle of the Aisne, Saint-Mihiel, Meuse-Argonne offensives under the command of Colonel Halstead Dorey. The entire regiment was decorated with the French Croix de Guerre, having lost eighty percent of its men, under constant and grueling fire during thirty days on the line; the regiment was relieved by the 60th Infantry.

On 7 October 1918 near Cunel, France, PFC John L. Barkley, Co. K, 4th Infantry was stationed in an observation post half a kilometer from the German line, on his own initiative repaired a captured enemy machinegun and mounted it in a disabled French tank near his post. Shortly afterward, when the enemy launched a counterattack against American forces, PFC Barkley got into the tank, waited under the hostile barrage until the enemy line was abreast of him and then opened fire, completely breaking up the counterattack and killing and wounding a large number of the enemy. Five minutes later an enemy 77-millimeter gun opened fire on the tank pointblank. One shell struck the drive wheel of the tank, but this soldier nevertheless remained in the tank and after the barrage ceased broke up a second enemy counterattack, thereby enabling American forces to gain and hold Hill 25. PFC Barkley received the Medal of Honor for his actions.

After a rest which the organization received six hundred replacements, it was marched to a position in the Forest De Passe, and on 9 November 1918, received orders to be ready on a moments notice. The men knew they were to take part in the final drive to encircle Metz in the event the Germans did not accept terms of the proposed armistice. Preparations were being made for the departure on the morning of 11 November, when the end of the war was heralded by the French villagers. The 4th Infantry served as part of the Army of Occupation in France, until 1919.

=== Interwar period ===
The 4th Infantry arrived at the port of New York on 23 August 1919 on the troopship USS Huron. It was transferred the next day to Camp Merritt, New Jersey, and to Camp Pike, Arkansas, on 30 August 1919. It transferred again to Camp Lewis, Washington, arriving there 20 September 1921. The regiment moved to Fort George Wright, Washington, arriving there 21 June 1922. Concurrently, the 1st Battalion transferred to Fort Missoula, Montana, and the 3rd Battalion to Fort Lawton, Washington. The regiment's initial wartime mission was to defend possible amphibious landing areas in support of the Harbor Defenses of Puget Sound. On 19 February 1925 the unit was permitted to wear its distinctive unit insignia, which consists of a red cloth loop with a green stripe, worn on the shoulder loops of the service coat. The 1st Battalion conducted forest firefighting operations in the Blackfeet National Forest and Glacier National Park from 16 July–8 August 1926. The regiment participated in the making of the movie The Patent Leather Kid in March–April 1927. The 3rd Battalion transferred on 11 October 1927 to Fort Lincoln, North Dakota. In April 1933, the regiment assumed command and control of the Fort Missoula, Fort Wright, and North Dakota Civilian Conservation Corps Districts. Organized Reserve officers assigned to the 3rd Battalion conducted summer training with the battalion at Fort Lincoln. The entire regiment, less the 3rd Battalion, transferred in December 1939 to Fort Lewis for permanent station. The regiment was relieved on 14 May 1940 from the 3rd Division, and the 3rd Battalion transferred to Fort Lewis on 15 May and was inactivated there on 23 May. The 3rd Battalion was reactivated on 22 June 1940 at Chilkoot Barracks, Territory of Alaska, with personnel and equipment from the inactivating 2nd Battalion, 32nd Infantry Regiment.

=== Alaska defense ===
The 1st Battalion. sailed from Seattle on the USAT St. Mihiel to Anchorage, and arrived there on 27 June 1940. The remainder of the regiment sailed on 26 December 1940 from Seattle on the St. Mihiel and arrived 3 January 1941 at Anchorage. Concurrently assigned to the Alaskan Defense Command. The regiment, the first organization of such size to arrive in Alaska, began clearing ground for what became Fort Richardson.

The 4th formed the nucleus for the Alaska Defense Command to deter a Japanese invasion of Alaska. The Japanese began to build up forces on the southernmost Alaskan islands and the Fourth's major battle of the war was the Battle of Attu, a Japanese held island. On 8 May 1943 soldiers of the Fourth climbed over the sides of their transport ships to land on Massacre Bay. Major John D. O'Reilly of Seattle, battalion commander, who was later to receive a battlefield promotion to lieutenant colonel, reported to Major General Eugene M. Landrum. Carrying extra rations and ammunition, the troops marched to engage the enemy less than 24 hours after landing. On Attu Island, the First Battalion fought the Japanese at altitudes of 2000 feet on snow-covered mountains. Moving north along the high west ridge of Chichagof Valley on 21 May 1943 the battalion came up against strong enemy opposition from machine gun and sniper positions. Later that day, the battalion moved along the ridge to a point where visual contact was established with other American forces that had proceeded inland from the Holtz Bay area, on the opposite side of the island.

After five straight days of strong enemy opposition, the First Battalion was pulled to the rear for rest and to prepare for their next mission. After a day's rest, the First Battalion was given the task of clearing entrenched Japanese defenders from the high peaks of Fish Hook Ridge. Covered only by mortar and machine gun fire, troops of Company A scaled steep cliffs while facing heavy enemy fire. Small groups of soldiers were clearly visible as they slowly inched their way up to the enemy held peaks. Many were wounded or killed, but the battalion on 27 May 1943 finally took a portion of a high rock on the northeast end of the ridge, giving them a commanding position overlooking the main ridge running east toward the Chichagof Valley.

The fighting continued into the night and by 1900 hours on the next day, the 4th Infantry had accomplished its mission. The Presidential Unit Citation was awarded to the 1st Battalion for its heroism during the attack on the peaks. The next day, the American invasion force engaged and defeated 1,000 Japanese in a suicide counter-attack near Sarana Valley. The Fourth was given the task of combing the area of Chichagof Valley by active patrolling, hunting out and capturing or killing Japanese stragglers. This was the last engagement with the Japanese for the regiment. The Japanese had been driven from Alaska's Aleutian Islands. In the fighting the regiment lost approximately five officers and sixty enlisted men.

2nd Battalion, 4th Infantry participated in a large troop movements by air. Early on the morning of 19 June 1942 the battalion was ordered to move to Nome, Alaska, near the edge of the Arctic Circle, where unidentified planes were flying threatening an invasion. Only a small number of army transport planes were available. The situation was critical and orders required that the vanguard of the force, 20 anti-aircraft guns and their crews, be in Nome within 24 hours. All civilian air traffic in Alaska was stopped that day and every suitable airplane in the vicinity was requisitioned for the movement. The fleet of planes included Stinsons, Bellancas, and two old Ford Tri-motors. By midnight of the same day, after 39 individual trips, the anti-aircraft units had been moved to Nome and the big shuttle movement was under way. Despite weather that kept the planes on the ground part of the time, the entire force and all its equipment, with the exception of big field guns and similar heavy equipment, was transported to Nome in a period of 18 days. The movement would have been completed in a week had it not been for the unfavorable weather conditions. Cargo-carrying commercial planes coming in from China were used to supplement the air armada. The midnight sun, providing almost full 24 hours of daylight, made it possible for some of the planes to make two trips in a single day. Ammunition, rations, tents, even 37 millimeter guns and field kitchens, everything necessary to make the force self-sufficient were moved by air without one accident. Heavy weapons were brought up later by boat. The troops stepped out of the planes in Nome, equipped and ready to fight. The total flights came to 218. The troops maneuvered in weather from 20 to 35 degrees below zero. They found that none of the elaborate footgear provided by the army protected their feet as well as the native Mukluk, made by the Eskimos from deer and the hide of sealskins. The 2nd Battalion remained in Nome for a year, later moving to the Aleutians. First to Dutch Harbor then to Adak, where they experienced other types of bad weather.

The 3rd Battalion, which included two companies that were stationed at Chikoot Barracks for many years before the war, helped to establish two big bases, Fort Richardson and Ladd Field.

On 2 December 1943, the 4th returned to the Lower 48, and after consolidating the regiment at Fort Lewis, Washington, it moved on 23 January 1944 to Fort Benning, Georgia, where it was assigned to the United States Army Replacement and School Command. On 1 November 1945, the 4th Infantry was assigned to the 25th Infantry Division. The incumbent personnel and equipment were reassigned to the 4th Infantry Division, which was at Camp Butner, North Carolina, while the regimental records and accouterments were forwarded to Japan to establish a unit for occupation duty. This iteration of the 4th Infantry Regiment was inactivated on 31 January 1947, at Osaka, Japan. The records and accouterments were returned to the United States and the 4th Infantry Regiment was relieved from assignment to the 25th Division on 1 February 1947.

=== NATO mission ===
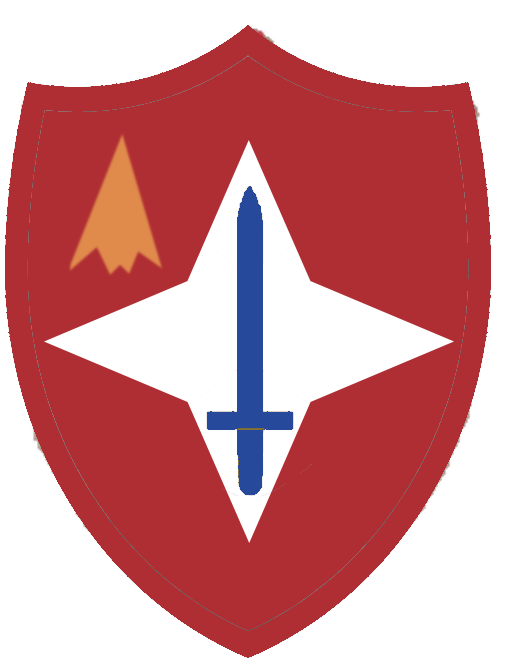
4th Regimental Combat Team SSI 1948-1963

The 4th was again activated on 1 October 1948 at Fort Lewis, Washington, as the 4th Regimental Combat Team. It served in this assignment for six years with, the 1st Battalion being sent to Ft. Richardson, Alaska, and participating in Operation Sweetbrier, an exercise to determine if Alaska could be defended if an attack from the Soviet Union came from over the pole. It was then assigned as an organic element of the 71st Infantry Division on 10 October 1954. On 15 September 1956, the 4th Infantry was assigned to the 4th Regimental Combat Team for the second time in this capacity and served for nearly a year. On 1 July 1957, the colors of Company B were relieved from assignment to the 4th Regimental Combat Team, reorganized and redesigned Headquarters Company, 2nd Battle Group, 4th Infantry, and assigned as an organic element of the 3d Infantry Division with duty station at Fort Benning, Georgia. The remaining companies and a mortar battery to comprise the 2d Battle Group, 4th Infantry were organized for the 1st and 2d Battalions, 15th Infantry which were already stationed at Fort Benning.

On 22 July 1957, Colonel Seymore B. Satterwhite assumed command of the 2nd Battle Group, 4th Infantry and by 20 July all personnel of the battle group were thoroughly oriented on the ROCID concept. By 15 September 1957 the battle group had completed its organization under ROCID TO&E 7-11T, 1956, thus cadre training commenced in preparation for receiving 1,189 new soldiers straight from civilian life that would bring the unit to combat strength. The 2d Battle Group, 4th Infantry received the first 26 men on 12 November 1957. The remainder of the men arrived shortly after, and all of the men completed their basic training in time to go on leave for Christmas. When they returned in January, training was resumed, and training of all phases was completed by 3 April 1958. On 15 February 1958, it officially was reorganized and redesignated Headquarters and Headquarters Company, 2nd Battle Group, 4th Infantry and assigned to the U.S. 3rd Infantry Division.

On that same date, the 1st Battle Group, 4th Infantry was assigned to the separate 2d Infantry Brigade.

Embarkation leaves were held during April, and on 13 May 1958, the 2d Battle Group, 4th Infantry boarded the USNS Rose for Bremerhaven, Germany. The unit arrived in Bremerhaven on 22 May 1958 and reached Bamberg on 24 May 1958.

On 2 April 1962, the 1st Battle Group, 4th Infantry was inactivated at Fort Devens, Massachusetts.

On 18 April 1963 the 2d Battle Group, 4th Infantry was relieved from assignment to the 3d Infantry Division and the 1st Battalion, 4th Infantry was redesignated and assigned to the 3d Infantry Division. On 3 June 1963, the 2d Battle Group, 4th Infantry was inactivated in Germany and on 5 June 1963 the 1st Battalion, 4th Infantry was activated. The 2d Battle Group, 4th Infantry would later be activated (21 July 1969) as the 2d Battalion, 4th Infantry at Fort Campbell, Kentucky. The 3d Battle Group, 4th Infantry (Army Reserve) would become the 3d Battalion, 4th Infantry and be inactivated at Fairfield, Illinois, on 31 December 1965.

In 1965, the 1st Battalion, 4th Infantry joined the 3d Brigade, 3d Infantry Division in Aschaffenburg, Germany. Taking part in the many REFORGER training exercises in Germany. The battalion was named "Warrior" Battalion in 1966 to commemorate the long service by the regiment between fighting wars and later protecting Indians in Florida, the Pacific Northwest, and the Great Plains.

In May 1983, the 1st Battalion, 4th Infantry began to reorganize to the Division 86 concept in the Army of Excellence program by President Ronald Reagan, with the expectation of stopping a Soviet invasion of West Germany at the "Hofsburg Throat." This caused the battalion to expand to four rifle companies, an anti-armor company and a very large headquarters and headquarters company.

In May 1984, the 1st Battalion, 4th Infantry began to transition to the M2 Bradley Infantry Fighting Vehicle. The transition was completed in August 1984. In the late 1980s the government again began to reduce the armed forces and the 1st Battalion, 4th Infantry was listed for inactivation, which took place on 16 December 1987 and the unit was relieved from assignment to the 3d Infantry Division. However, the battalion until then known as 1st Battalion, 4th Infantry (Warrior Battalion), then stationed in Aschaffenburg Germany, was reflagged as the 4th Battalion, 7th Infantry (Fighting Fourth), and remained in place as part of the 3d Brigade, 3d Infantry Division.

In the summer of 1990, Company C moved from its Pershing II mission and provided security for Operation Steel Box/Golden Python (chemical weapons retrograde from Germany) at Miesau Army Depot. The unit deployed to secure the temporary storage area at the Miesau rail head, guarding over 100,000 toxic chemical artillery projectiles in steel shipping containers. Company C received the Army Superior Unit Award for flawless execution of this security mission. In November 1990, Company C was the first of the 2nd Battalion units to move to the CMTC – Hohenfels, Germany to reactivate as Company C, 1st Battalion, 4th Infantry and assume role as OPFOR.

The 2d Battalion, 4th Infantry was inactive until 2004 when it was reactivated at Fort Polk (now Fort Johnson), Louisiana, as part of the 4th Brigade Combat Team, 10th Mountain Division. The 2d Battalion, 4th Infantry deployed to Afghanistan in support of Operation Enduring Freedom in 2006.

The 3d Battalion, 4th Infantry Regiment was reactivated on 16 October 2009 in Germany as part of the 170th Infantry Brigade

=== Pershing ===
==== 2nd Battalion, 4th Infantry Regiment ====
Reorganized and redesignated 15 February 1958 as Headquarters and Headquarters Company, 2nd Battle Group, 4th Infantry, and assigned to the 3rd Infantry Division (organic elements concurrently constituted and activated), Battle Group relieved 18 April 1963 from assignment to the 3rd Infantry Division, Inactivated 3 June 1963 in West Germany. Redesignated 21 July 1969 as the 2nd Battalion, 4th Infantry, and activated at Fort Campbell, Kentucky. On 18 September 1970 the battalion was assigned to the 56th Field Artillery Brigade headquartered in Schwäbisch Gmünd, West Germany.

Headquarters and Headquarters Company (HHC) and Company A were garrisoned at Flak Kaserne in Ludwigsburg. Company B was at Nelson Barracks in Neu Ulm and Company C was at Artillery Kaserne in Heilbronn. HHC moved to Nelson Barracks in Neu Ulm in 1971. Company A moved to Wilkins Barracks in Kornwestheim, then to Nelson Barracks in Neu Ulm in 1986. Company C moved to Wharton Barracks in Heilbronn in 1971. By 1972 HHC was at Wilkins Barracks in Kornwestheim, as was battalion headquarters.

The unit defended the missile battalions from intruding protesters of the Nationalist Green Party and other elements. The mission of the 2d Battalion, 4th Infantry was to provide armed security, including patrols, of the Pershing nuclear missiles and missile storage sites; Mutlangen was the Missile Storage Site, and Inneringen (Company A), Von Steuben (Company B), and Red Leg (Company C) were the 3 Combat Alert Sites (CAS). Additional duties included protecting Pershing nuclear systems during field operations and dealing with numerous anti-nuclear protests, as well as a rigorous infantry training schedule. Initially, HHC (Hurons) and Company A (Apaches or Alpha) were stationed at Wilkins Barracks in Kornwestheim, outside of Stuttgart; Company B (Blackfeet) was stationed at Nelson Kaserne in Neu Ulm; and, Company C (Cherokees) was stationed at Wharton Barracks and ultimately moved to Badenerhof Kaserne, both in Heilbronn. HHC and Company A were relocated to Nelson Kaserne in Neu Ulm at some point.

The 2nd Battalion, 4th Infantry participated in major exercises each winter at training areas such as Baumholder, Hohenfels, Wildflecken, and Grafenwoehr. This helped to prepare the unit for encounters with Warsaw Pact military forces in the event of an assault on the missile sites. This was considered a very real possibility during the years of the Cold War. In addition each of the line companies rotated each year to Doughboy City, Berlin to train in military operations in an urban terrain (MOUT).

On 18 August 1971, soldiers from the heavy mortar platoon from battalion headquarters were being transported from Ludwigsburg to Grafenwoehr for live fire training exercises aboard a CH-47A helicopter. The helicopter crashed and exploded, killing all 38 on board, including four members of the 4th Aviation Company.

On 17 January 1986 the battalion was withdrawn from the Combat Arms Regimental System and reorganized under the United States Army Regimental System.

The signing of the Intermediate Nuclear Forces (INF) Treaty (1987), the fall of the Berlin Wall 1989, and the demise of the Soviet Union (1991) signaled the end of the Cold War and resulted in the eventual inactivation of the 2d Battalion, 4th Infantry. On 15 May 1991, the 56th Field Artillery Command and all its subordinate units were inactivated.

=== OPFOR role ===
Soldiers from 1st Battalion, 4th Infantry Regiment, known as "the men in black," due to their all black opposing force uniform

On 16 November 1990, 1st Battalion, 4th Infantry was assigned as the Opposing Force (OPFOR) at the Joint Multinational Readiness Center, Hohenfels, Germany. The battalion consists of three rifle companies, a tank company, a Combat Support Company, and a headquarters and headquarters company. The combat support company was disbanded in 1995 and the platoons reassigned to the HHC. In order to support the USAREUR commander's training strategy the battalion portrays a brigade tactical group or an insurgency that challenges all the battlefield operating systems of rotational units in force-on-force situations.

The battalion has trained units deploying to Bosnia, Kosovo, Iraq, and Afghanistan, during high intensity conflict rotations, and mission readiness exercises. Additionally, the battalion has deployed forces to other countries to take part in training exercises to include the training of security forces for the 2004 Summer Olympics in Athens, Greece.

In addition to its OPFOR mission, the battalion has the same training requirements as other infantry battalions in the army. The battalion conducts squad external evaluations, tank gunnery, antitank gunnery, training for urban operations, marksmanship, and live fire exercises.

=== Afghanistan ===
In August 2004 the battalion deployed Company A to Afghanistan in support of Operation Enduring Freedom. Team Apache was awarded the Meritorious Unit Commendation (MUC) for its service as the only US force in the International Security Assistance Force from August to December 2004.

The MUC citation reads: During the period of 31 August to 12 December 2004, Company A, 1st Battalion, 4th Infantry distinguished themselves while in support of the International Security Assistance Force operations led by the North Atlantic Treaty Organization in Afghanistan. They provided superb support to coalition forces supporting a safe and successful Afghanistan National Presidential Election. Throughout the operation the company performed as a lethal, responsive, and relevant combat force directly responsible for supporting security and stabilization forces in theater. Their ability to respond to crisis was superb. Company A, 1st Battalion, 4th Infantry's efforts reflect great credit upon themselves, the North Atlantic Treaty Organization, and the United States Army.

In August 2005 the battalion deployed Company D to Afghanistan in support of Operation Enduring Freedom. Team Dragon was used as a force protection company for the newly formed Afghanistan elections. Team Dragon was awarded the Joint Meritorious Unit Commendation for its service. Most of Team Dragon returned November 2006.

During 2006, the 2d Battalion, 4th Infantry formed the core of a task force that deployed to Zabol Province in eastern Afghanistan for Operation Enduring Freedom. Along with other elements of the 4th Brigade, 10th Mountain Division, 2–4 Infantry and TF Boar conducted combat operations in support of Combined Forces Command Afghanistan and the International Security Assistance Force.

Starting in July 2006 and ended in January 2011, the 1st Battalion, 4th Infantry relieved its sister battalion in Zabol Province, Afghanistan, as part of ISAF's assumption of responsibility for the province. As part of TF Zabul, nominally under Romanian command, 1–4 maintained a reinforced infantry company in the mountainous northern regions of the province, responsible for all combat operations in that area. The battalion rotated companies every 7 to 8 months, starting with C Company, followed in turn by B, A, and D companies. While each task force was deployed, the remaining companies of 1–4 continued their OPFOR mission in Hohenfels, Germany as well as training for their next combat mission in Afghanistan.

2–4 Infantry deployed again in late 2007 to Iraq with 4th Brigade, 10th Mountain Division, this time for 15 months as part of the "surge" strategy. Their deployment ended January 2009.

2–4 Infantry once again deployed to Afghanistan in 2010 under 4th Brigade, 10th Mountain Division in support of Operation Enduring Freedom.

As of 7 January 2011 the 1st Battalion, 4th Infantry has halted all deployments to Afghanistan after Company C's return, and it now serves only as the OPFOR unit for Hohenfels, Germany.

Company C, 2-4 conducted combat operations in support of Operation Enduring Freedom XX in 3 different provinces including Logar, Wardak and Kabul. They were spread out into 7 different village stability outposts while directly supporting 7 different ODAs and 3 separate Navy SEAL teams. They completed a 9-month deployment in spring of 2014.

=== Operations in Germany ===
An article in the edition of 23 February 2012 of the Stars & Stripes reported the removal of 17 officers and NCOs from 3d Squadron (Recon & Surveillance), 108th Cavalry Regiment of the 560th Battlefield Surveillance Brigade (Georgia ARNG) during a peacekeeping mission in Kosovo "following an Army investigation into allegations about harsh tactics used to initiate junior troops." The article also stated that "Because so many of the Georgian company's leaders were pulled from their positions, USAREUR recently deployed two Army platoons and a command team from the Hohenfels-based 1st Battalion, 4th Infantry to support the company, [Lieutenant General] Hertling said."

An article in the edition of 27 June 2014 of the Stars & Stripes noted the inactivation of Company D, the armored element of the 1st Battalion, 4th Infantry Regiment at a ceremony conducted in Hohenfels.2 Bavarian units deactivate in dual ceremonies

== Lineage ==
- Constituted 11 January 1812 in the Regular Army as the 14th Infantry Regiment
- Organized in March 1812 in Virginia (recruited from eastern and western counties), Maryland, Delaware and Pennsylvania.
- Consolidated May–October 1815 with the 18th and 20th Infantry (both constituted 11 January 1812) and the 36th and 38th Infantry (both constituted 29 January 1813) to form the 4th Infantry Regiment.
- 21 August 1816 Unspecified 4th Infantry Regiment companies redesignated as Companies A and B, 4th Infantry Regiment.
- Consolidated in March 1869 with the 30th Infantry (see 30th Infantry Regiment below) and consolidated unit designated as the 4th Infantry Regiment as follows:

Company A, 4th infantry Regiment Consolidated with Company A, 30th Infantry Regiment
Company B, 4th Infantry Regiment Consolidated with Company B, 30th Infantry Regiment

- Assigned 1 October 1917 to the 3d Division, and reorganized as follows:

Company A reorganized and redesignated as HHC, 1st Battalion, 4th Infantry Regiment.
Company B reorganized and redesignated as HHC, 2nd Battalion, 4th Infantry Regiment.

- Regiment Stationed at the start of World War II at Fort George Wright Walsh, Washington.
- Regiment moved to Fort Ord, California, on 22 January 1940 to join the 3rd Division.
- Relieved 15 May 1940 from assignment to the 3d Division, and participated in World War II as a separate infantry regiment.
- Regiment returned to Fort George Wright Walsh on 23 May 1940, and the location remained the regimental garrison while its units rotated in and out of Fort Lewis, Washington, between 1 August 1940 and 26 August 1940.
- Regiment Deployed from the Seattle Port of Embarkation on 24 December 1940.
- Regiment arrived at Anchorage, Alaska, on 3 January 1941, where it was assigned to the Alaska Defense Command.
- Regiment arrived on Kodiak Island on 23 November 1942.
- Regiment arrived on Unalaska Island on 30 November 1942.
- Regiment posted to Adak Island on 8 December 1942.
- Regiment Assaulted Attu Island on 11 May 1943, and participated in the Battle For Fish Hook Ridge.
- Regiment relieved from assignment to Alaskan Defense Command, and returned to Seattle Port of Embarkation on 2 December 1943, and was stationed at Fort Lewis the same date.
- Regiment reassigned to the US Army Replacement and School Command at Fort Benning, Georgia, on 23 January 1944, where it conducted infantry training to prepare for the expected invasion of the Japanese Home Islands late in 1944.
- Regiment was at Fort Benning on 14 August 1945, which is when the surrender of the Japanese was announced.
- Assigned 1 November 1945 to the 25th Infantry Division. The incumbent personnel and equipment were reassigned to the 4th Infantry Division at Camp Butner, North Carolina, while the regimental records and accoutrements were forwarded to Japan for occupation duty.
- Inactivated 31 January 1947 in Japan
- Relieved 1 February 1947 from assignment to the 25th Infantry Division
- Activated 1 October 1948 at Fort Lewis, Washington, as a separate regiment.
- Assigned 10 October 1954 to the 71st Infantry Division
- Relieved 15 September 1956 from assignment to the 71st Infantry Division
- Reorganized 15 February 1958 as a parent regiment under the U.S. Army Combat Arms Regimental System, and assigned as follows:

1st Battle Group assigned to 2d Infantry Brigade.
2d Battle Group assigned to 3d Infantry Division.

- 1st Battle Group inactivated 2 April 1962 at Fort Devens, Massachusetts.
- 1st Battle Group relieved from assignment to the 2d Infantry Brigade, redesignated as the 1st Battalion, 4th Infantry, and assigned to the 3d Infantry Division on 18 April 1963.
- On 3 June 1963, 2d Battle Group's personnel and equipment were reassigned to the 1st Battalion, still with 3d Infantry Division.
- 1st Battalion, 4th Infantry activated on 5 June 1963.
- 2d Battle Group redesignated at 2d Battalion, 4th Infantry on 21 July 1969 and activated at Fort Campbell, Kentucky.
- Withdrawn 17 January 1986 from the Combat Arms Regimental System and reorganized under the United States Army Regimental System
- 1st Battalion inactivated on 16 December 1987 in Germany, and relieved from assignment to 3d Infantry Division.
- 1st Battalion activated on 16 November 1990 in Germany.
- 2d Battalion inactivated on 15 May 1991 in Germany.
- 2d Battalion redesignated as 2d Battalion, 4th Infantry Regiment on 1 October 2005.

=== Third Battalion ===
Re-activated on 15 July 2009, at Baumholder, Germany (assigned to the 170th Infantry Brigade Combat Team). Inactivated in October 2012.

=== 30th Infantry Regiment ===
- Constituted 3 June 1861 in the Regular Army as the 3d Battalion, 12th Infantry Regiment, with Companies A and B Constituted 3 May 1861.
- Organized 23 December 1865 at Fort Hamilton, New York
- Redesignated 7 December 1866 as the 30th Infantry Regiment
- Consolidated in March 1869 with the 4th Infantry and consolidated unit designated as the 4th Infantry Regiment. Companies A and B consolidated with identically designated companies in the 4th Infantry Regiment.

== Honors ==
=== Campaign participation credit ===
- War of 1812:
1. Bladensburg;
2. McHenry
- Mexican–American War:
1. Palo Alto;
2. Cañada;
3. Resaca de la Palma;
4. Monterrey;
5. Siege of Veracruz;
6. Cerro Gordo;
7. Churubusco;
8. Molino del Rey;
9. Chapultepec;
10. Puebla 1847;
11. Tlaxcala 1847
- American Civil War:
1. Peninsula Campaign;
2. Second Bull Run;
3. Antietam;
4. Fredericksburg;
5. Chancellorsville;
6. Gettysburg;
7. The Wilderness;
8. Spotsylvania Court House;
9. Cold Harbor;
10. Siege of Petersburg;
11. Appomattox Campaign
- Indian Wars:
1. Tippecanoe;
2. Seminole Wars;
3. Black Hawk War;
4. Little Bighorn Campaign;
5. Utes;
6. Oregon 1855;
7. Oregon 1856;
8. Washington 1855;
9. Washington 1856
- War with Spain (Cuba):
1. Santiago
- Philippine–American War (Philippines):
1. Manila;
2. Malolos;
3. Cavite;
4. Luzon
- World War I (France):
1. Aisne;
2. Champagne-Marne;
3. Aisne-Marne;
4. Saint-Mihiel;
5. Meuse-Argonne;
6. Champagne 1918
- World War II:
1. Aleutian Islands

=== Decorations ===
- Presidential Unit Citation (Army) for CHICHAGOF VALLEY (1st Battalion)
- French Croix de guerre with Gilt Star, World War I for CHAMPAGNE-MARNE AISNE-MARNE
- Superior Unit Award, streamer embroidered 1983–1986 (2nd Battalion)
- Superior Unit Award, Streamer embroidered 1990 (Company C, 2nd Battalion)
- Valorous Unit Award, Streamer embroidered OIF 07-09 (2nd Battalion, 4th Infantry Regiment)

== See also ==
- List of United States Regular Army Civil War units
