= William Ketchum =

William Ketchum may refer to:

- William M. Ketchum (1921–1978), U.S. Representative from California
- William Ketchum (mayor) (1798–1876), mayor of Buffalo, New York, 1844–1845
- William Scott Ketchum (1813–1871), U. S. Army officer before and during the American Civil War
