= Long Schoolhouse =

- U.S. National Register of Historic Places
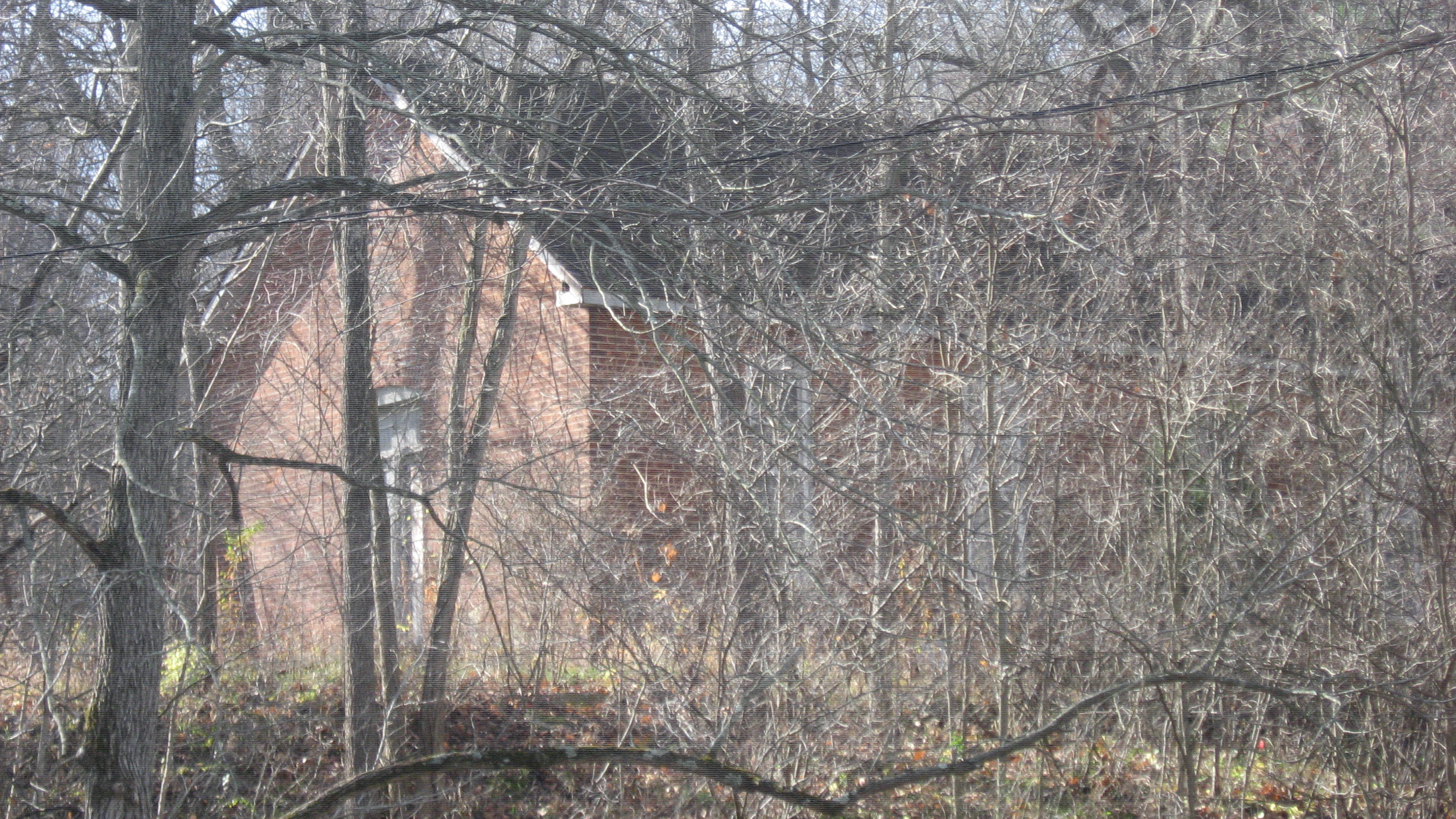
- Long Schoolhouse, November 2011

- Location within Indiana Location within the United States
- Location: 0.5 miles (0.80 km) northwest of the junction of Jordan Rd. and Hinson Rd., south of Martinsville in Washington Township, Morgan County, Indiana
- Coordinates: 39°22′6″N 86°27′4″W
- Area: less than one acre
- Built: 1883
- Built by: Anderson, J.; Douglas, C.G.
- Architectural style: Gable front
- MPS: Indiana's Public Common and High Schools MPS
- NRHP reference No.: 99001106
- Added to NRHP: September 9, 1999

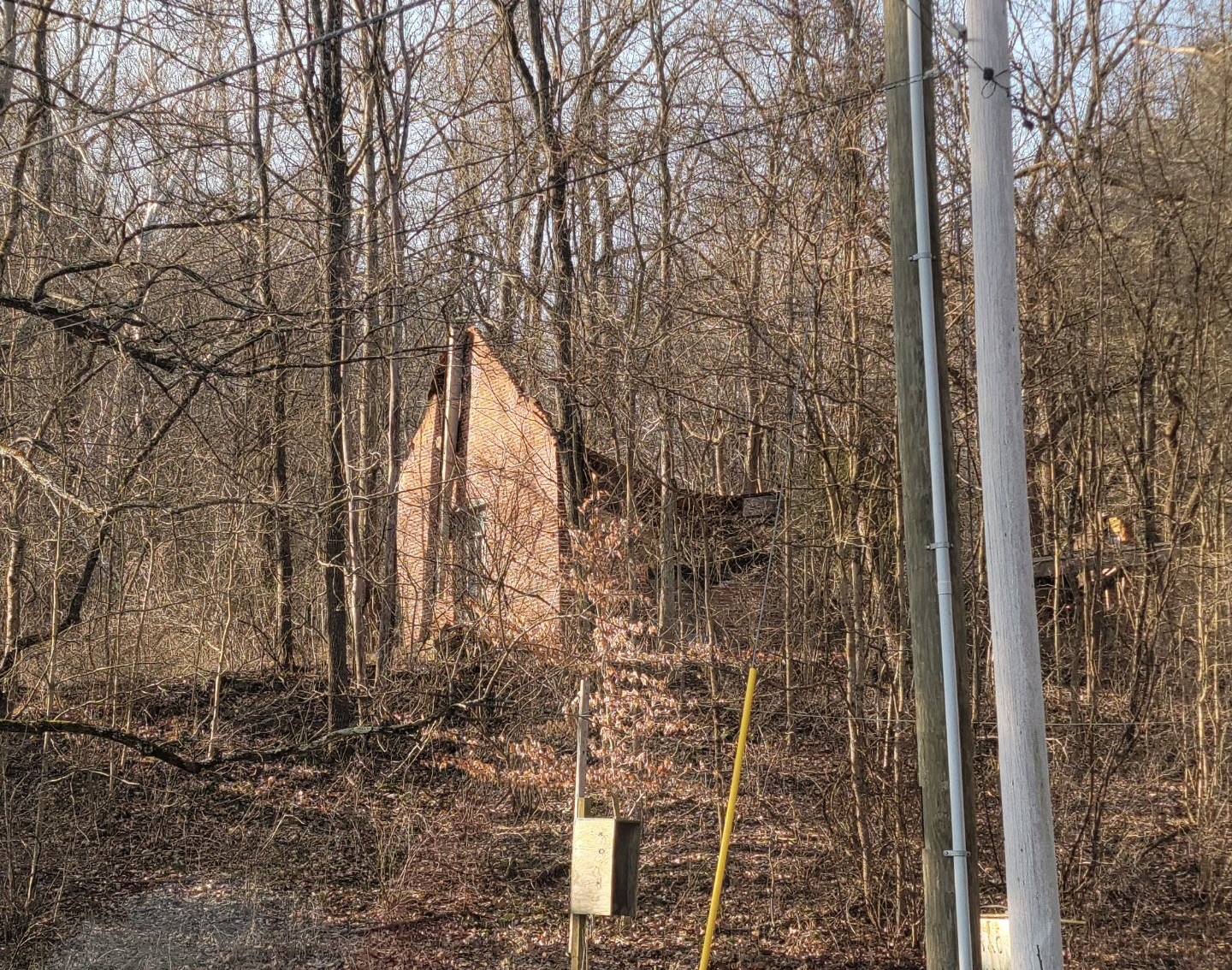
Long Schoolhouse, February 2023

Long Schoolhouse, also known as Washington Township District No. 13 and Nancy Long School, is a historic one-room school building located in Washington Township, Morgan County, Indiana. It was built in 1883, and is a simple one-story, rectangular, brick building with a gable roof. It features segmental arched window openings. It operated as a rural school until 1938. It is maintained by the Jordan Home Economics Club, Inc.As of 2023, the roof has collapsed but the structure still stands.

It was listed on the National Register of Historic Places in 1999.
