= Martinsville Sanitarium =

- U.S. National Register of Historic Places
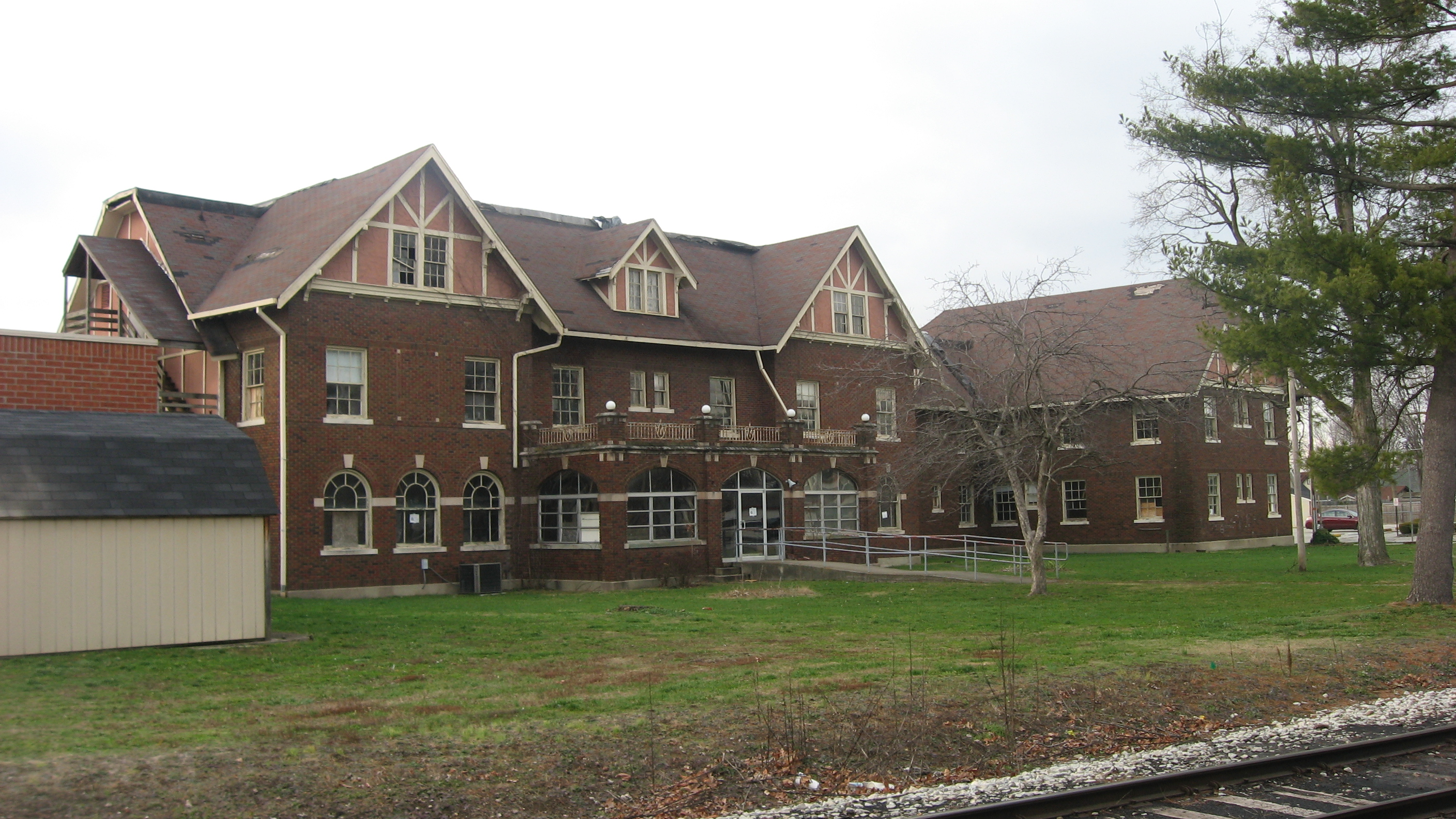
- Martinsville Sanitarium, December 2011

- Location within Indiana Location within the United States
- Location: 239 W. Harrison St., Martinsville, Indiana
- Coordinates: 39°25′52″N 86°25′55″W
- Area: less than one acre
- Built: 1925-1926
- Built by: Duncan, C.F.
- Architect: Parker, Wilson B.
- Architectural style: Tudor Revival, Bungalow/craftsman
- NRHP reference No.: 05001368
- Added to NRHP: December 6, 2005

Martinsville Sanitarium is a historic mineral water sanitarium located at Martinsville, Indiana. It was built in 1925–1926, and is a 2 1/2-story, "oriental brick" and limestone building with an eclectic combination of Tudor Revival, Colonial Revival, Renaissance Revival, and Bungalow/American Craftsman style design elements. The main section measures 160 feet by 55 feet and has two projecting wings. It is topped by a cross-gabled hipped roof and features a sun porch, half-timbered gables, and overhanging eaves. The building faces the Martinsville Vandalia Depot.

It was listed on the National Register of Historic Places in 2005.

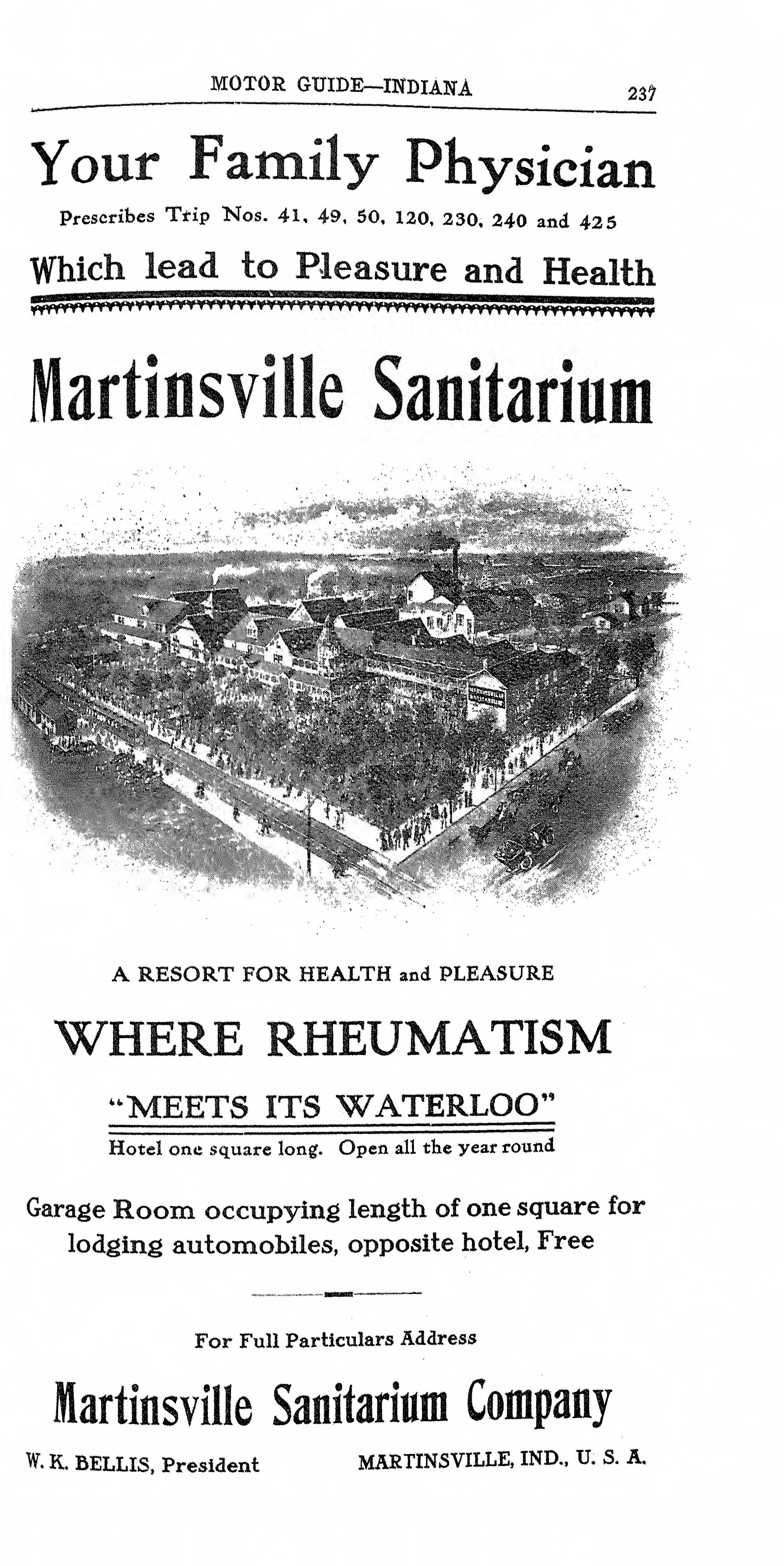
Advertisement for Martinsville Sanitarium from Scarborough's Road Map and Motor Guide of Indiana. d. 1912
