= John C. Wetherby =

American Medal of Honor recipient

- Born: July 2, 1880; Morgan County, Indiana
- Died: November 29, 1899 (aged 19); Imus, Cavite, Philippines
- Burial place: Mahalasville, Indiana
- Military career
- Allegiance: United States of America
- Branch: United States Army
- Service years: 1898–1899
- Rank: Private
- Units: Company L, 4th U.S Infantry
- Conflicts: Philippine–American War
- Awards: Medal of Honor

John C. Wetherby (July 2, 1880 – November 29, 1899) was a private in the United States Army and a posthumous Medal of Honor recipient for his actions in the Philippine–American War.

Wetherby joined the army from Indianapolis in October 1898.

== Medal of Honor citation ==
Rank and organization: Private, Company L, 4th U.S. Infantry. Place and date: Near Imus, Luzon, Philippine Islands, November 20, 1899. Entered service at: Martinsville, Ind. Birth: Morgan County, Ind. Date of issue: April 25, 1902.

Citation:

While carrying important orders on the battlefield, was desperately wounded and, being unable to walk, crawled far enough to deliver his orders.

== See also ==
- List of Philippine–American War Medal of Honor recipients
