= Grassyfork Fisheries Farm No. 1 =

- U.S. National Register of Historic Places
- U.S. Historic district
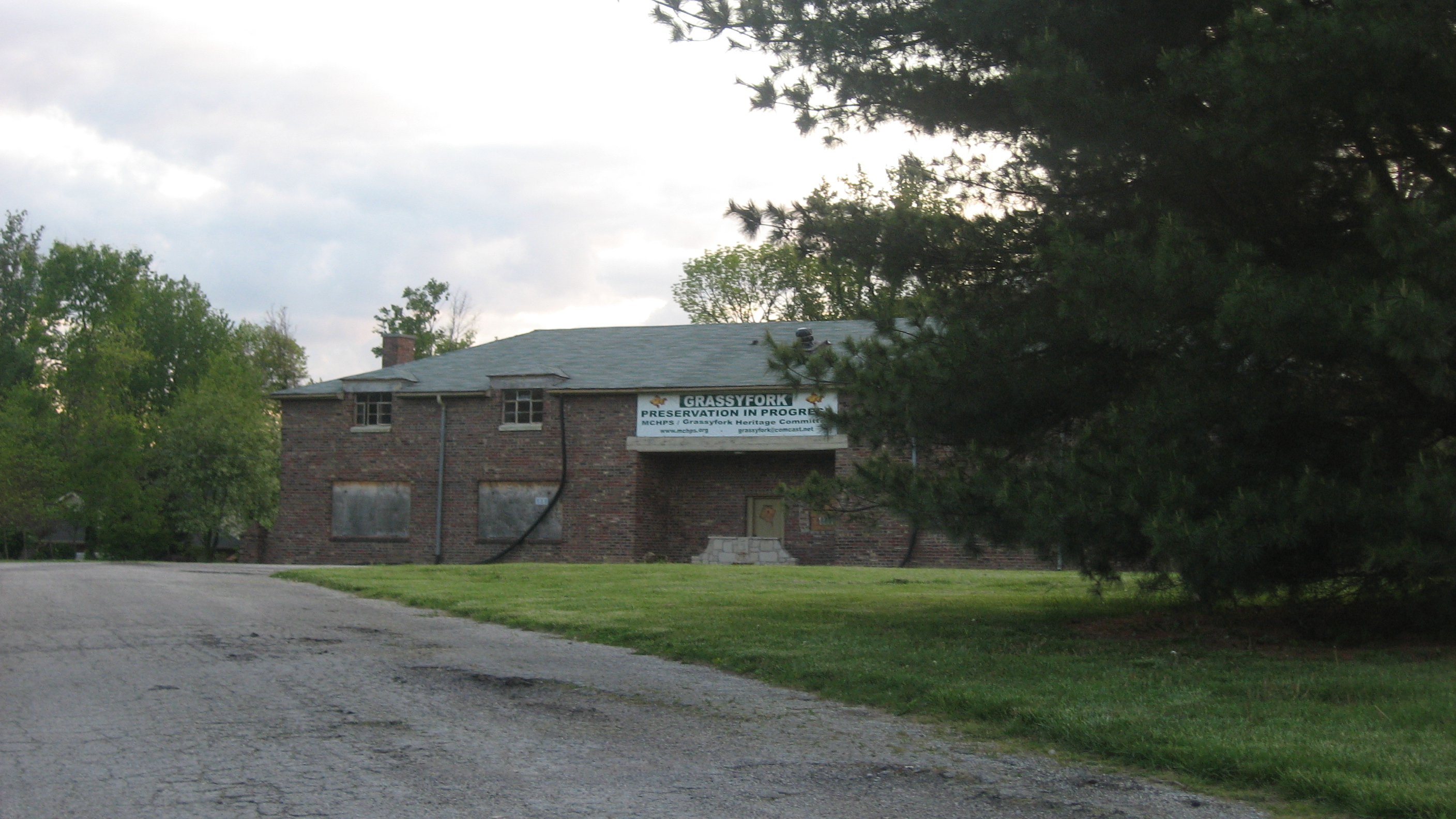
- Grassyfork Fisheries Farm No. 1, April 2012

- Location within Indiana Location within the United States
- Location: 2902 E. Morgan St., northeast of Martinsville in Washington Township, Morgan County, Indiana
- Coordinates: 39°26′37″N 86°26′23″W
- Area: 254 acres (103 ha)
- Built: 1936
- Architect: Cramer, Julian; Cramer, Leonard; Cramer Brothers
- NRHP reference No.: 12000189
- Added to NRHP: July 10, 2012

Grassyfork Fisheries Farm No. 1, also known as Ozark Fisheries Shireman Farm, is a historic goldfish hatchery and national historic district located in Washington Township, Morgan County, Indiana. The Grassyfork Office and Display Room building was built in 1936, and is a one-story, rectangular, brick building with a hipped roof. It measures 36 feet by 100 feet. The property includes a variety of buildings, structures, and sites associated with the fish hatchery. Among them are a barn, six wells, two dams, remains of formal landscaping and rock garden, and all goldfish ponds, levees, and associated dirt roads.

It was listed on the National Register of Historic Places in 2012.
