= William Scott Ketchum =

American general

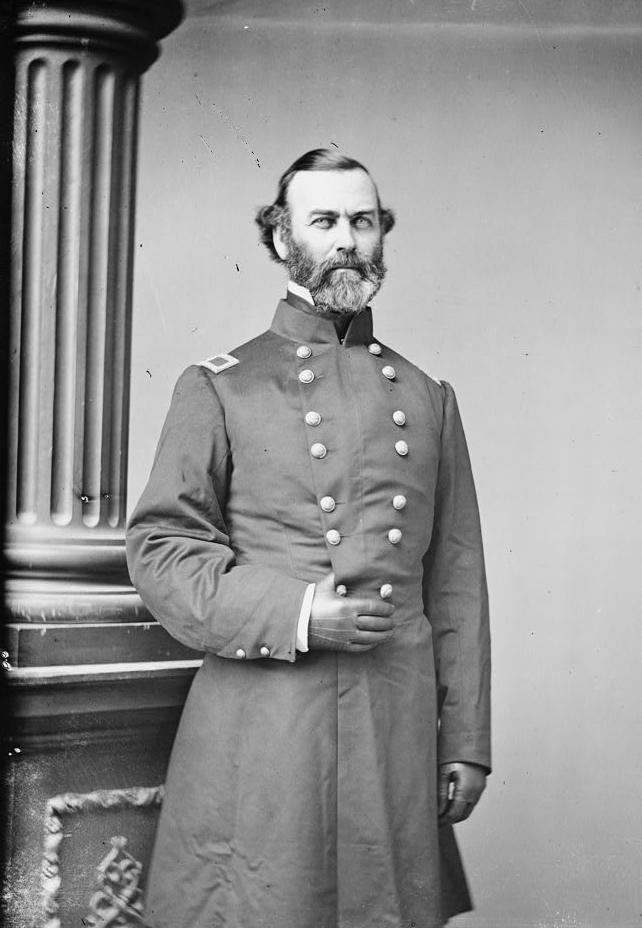
- William S. Ketchum
- Born: July 7, 1813; Norwalk, Connecticut, U.S.
- Died: June 28, 1871 (aged 57); Baltimore, Maryland, U.S.
- Burial place: Rock Creek Cemetery in Washington, D.C.
- Military career
- Allegiance: United States of America; Union
- Branch: United States Army; Union Army
- Service years: 1834–1870
- Rank: Colonel; Brevet Major General
- Conflicts: Second Seminole War; First Sioux War; 1857 Cheyenne Expedition; Battle of Solomon's Fork; Bleeding Kansas; Utah War; Mohave War; American Civil War

William Scott Ketchum (July 7, 1813 – 1871) was a U.S. Army officer before and during the American Civil War.

Ketchum was born on July 7, 1813, in Norwalk, Connecticut. He graduated from the United States Military Academy at West Point, New York in 1834. He served in the Seminole Wars and on the Western frontier. During the 1857 Cheyenne Expedition of Colonel Edwin Vose Sumner against the Cheyenne and the Battle of Solomon's Fork, Captain Ketchum of G Company commanded the 6th Infantry Regiment detachment (of C, D and G Companies).

== Civil War ==
At the start of the Civil War, Major Ketchum now with US Fourth Infantry Regiment commanded Fort Dalles in Oregon, protecting settlers from Indian raids. He was ordered to San Francisco and then sent to take command of the federal troops in Southern California to protect it from secessionist rising and Confederate invasion from Arizona or Texas. Headquartered in San Bernardino, California, his troops kept an eye on the secessionists of the region and reinforced Fort Yuma. Relieved by California Volunteer troops, Ketchum and his regiment assembled in San Pedro for the voyage to eastern United States in the late fall of 1861. Ketchum was promoted to lieutenant colonel in late 1861. He was made a brigadier general of Volunteers in February 1862. For the rest of the war he had staff duties in Washington, D.C., and was concerned with inspection, recruiting, and auditing.

Following the Civil War, General Ketchum spent four years on special service in the adjutant general’s office in Washington, D.C., then retired in December 1870. He died on June 28, 1871, in Baltimore, Maryland, under suspicious circumstances, the landlady of his boarding house, Ellen G. Wharton being suspected of poisoning him. She was found not guilty.

== In popular culture ==
The mysterious circumstances surrounding General Ketchum’s death were dramatized in the CBS radio program Crime Classics on 27 July 1953 in the episode entitled ‘The Final Day of General Ketchum’. Ketchum was portrayed by Russell Simpson in the broadcast.
