= Morgan County Public Library =

Historic Carnegie library in Indiana, U.S.

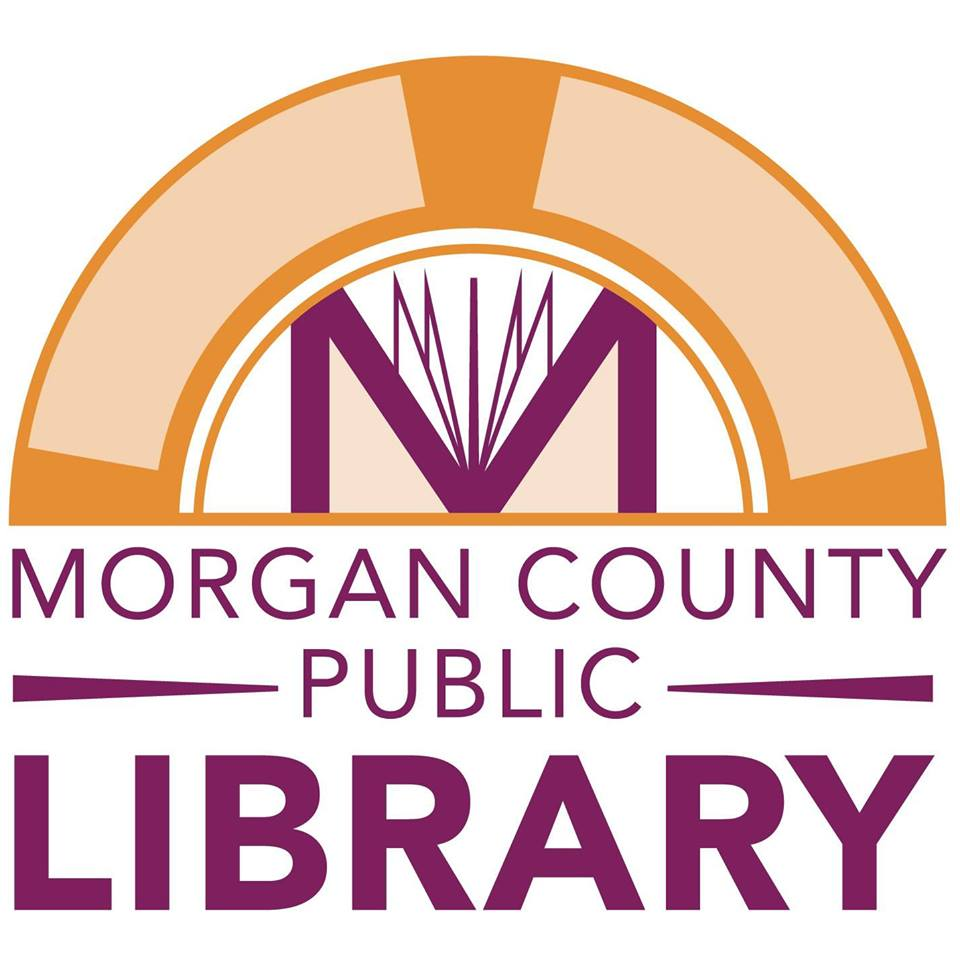
- 39.4256°N 86.4276°W
- Location: Martinsville, Indiana, U.S.
- Type: Public

Other information
- Website: morgancountylibrary.info

The Morgan County Public Library is located in Martinsville, Indiana, and has five branches in addition to the main library.

== History ==
The Morgan County Public Library was founded in 1906 as the Martinsville Public Library in Martinsville, Indiana. Andrew Carnegie donated $12,500 for the library's construction, which was just sufficient to build a brick building. However, Martinsville city officials wanted a limestone structure, and raised an additional $2,400 through the sale of bonds. The library was built of Bedford limestone and opened in September 1908, with a collection of 1,500 books.

The Martinsville Public Library continued to operate, serving the citizens of Martinsville and the surrounding Washington Township, until 1971. In that year, the library merged with the Bookmobile service to become the Morgan County Contractual Library and expanded its operations to serve the entire county except Brown Township (Moorseville). In 1976, the library again changed names to the current Morgan County Public Library.

In 1990, the library underwent a $1.7 million expansion and renovation which quadrupled its size. Additional historic renovation began in 1996 and included roof repairs, tuckpointing, and lead paint removal. On the exterior, trim was repainted and leaded glass replaced. An extensive interior remodeling included ceramic tile in the basement, new carpeting in all public areas, and wallpaper removal and repainting. After a second expansion and renovation in 2020, the Main Library is now 28,700 square feet, and solar panels were added in 2025. The Main Library houses over 100,000 volumes, as well as a large selection of books on CD, magazines, DVD movies, video games, and public computers (as well as wireless connection). The main library has an extensive genealogy collection including digitized records, microfilm, local histories, yearbooks and other records in paper form. In all, there are over 150,000 physical items in circulation throughout the library system. The Library has an extensive digital collection as well, offering downloadable ebooks, magazines, and audiobooks through the Libby platform; ebooks, audiobooks, graphic novels, music and movies through the Hoopla platform, and movies, TV shows and children's videos through the Kanopy platform.

The Morgan County Public Library currently provides library services at the Main Library in Martinsville and five branch locations in the towns of Brooklyn, Eminence, Monrovia, Morgantown and Waverly. In 2009, the Library became part of the Evergreen Indiana consortium which allows patrons access to over eight million items and over 130 libraries statewide.
