= Washington Township, Morgan County, Indiana =

Washington Township
- Township
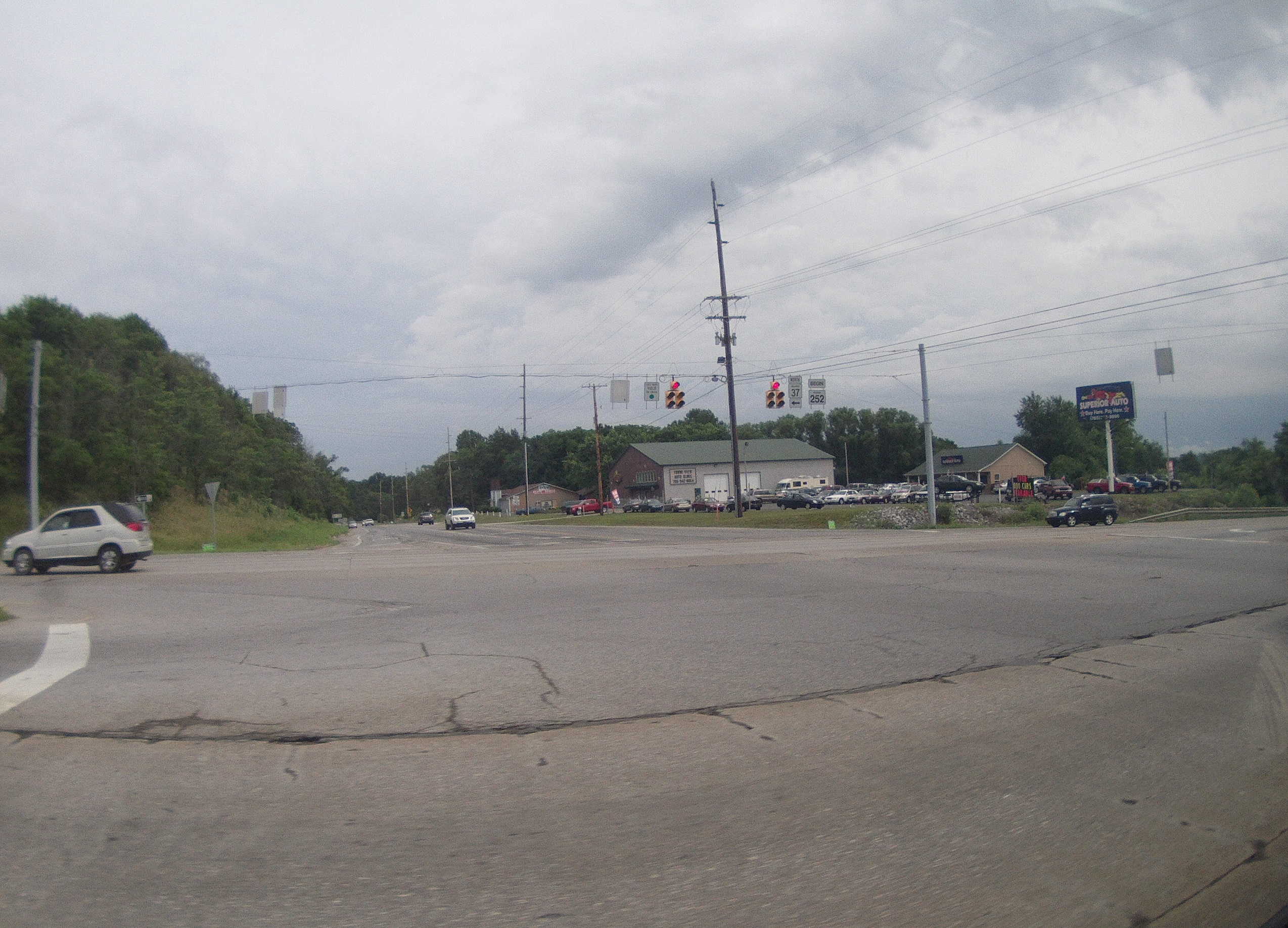
- Intersection of State Highways 37 and 252 in Washington Township

- Location in Morgan County
- Coordinates: 39°24′22″N 86°24′54″W
- Country: United States
- State: Indiana
- County: Morgan

Government
  - Type: Indiana township

Area
  - Total: 59.03 sq mi (152.9 km^{2})
  - Land: 57.51 sq mi (149.0 km^{2})
  - Water: 1.51 sq mi (3.9 km^{2}) 2.56%
- Elevation: 604 ft (184 m)

Population (2020)
  - Total: 17,657
  - Density: 296.9/sq mi (114.6/km^{2})
- Time zone: UTC-5 (Eastern (EST))
  - Summer (DST): UTC-4 (EDT)
- ZIP codes: 46151, 46160
- GNIS feature ID: 454008
- Website: www.wtt1976.com

Washington Township is one of fourteen townships in Morgan County, Indiana, United States. As of the 2010 census, its population was 17,073 and it contained 7,171 housing units. The township contains a portion of the Morgan–Monroe State Forest.

== History ==
The Cross School, Grassyfork Fisheries Farm No. 1, and Long Schoolhouse are listed on the National Register of Historic Places.

== Geography ==
According to the 2010 census, the township has a total area of 59.03 square miles (152.9 km^{2}), of which 57.51 square miles (149.0 km^{2}) (or 97.43%) is land and 1.51 square miles (3.9 km^{2}) (or 2.56%) is water. The White River defines the township's north border.

=== Cities, towns, villages ===
- Martinsville

=== Unincorporated towns ===
- Champlin Meadows at 39.407547°N 86.436662°W
- Mahalasville at 39.360326°N 86.362771°W
- Maxwell at 39.38727°N 86.455551°W
- Shelburne at 39.435325°N 86.392772°W
- Stines Mill Corner at 39.475881°N 86.372771°W
- Willowbrook Estates at 39.477548°N 86.364993°W
- Wolff at 39.433103°N 86.395272°W
- Woodcrest at 39.437548°N 86.394716°W

(This list is based on USGS data and may include former settlements.)

=== Cemeteries ===
The township contains these four cemeteries: Hill Dale, Maxwell, Nutter and Williams.

=== Major highways ===
- Interstate 69
- Indiana State Road 37
- Indiana State Road 39
- Indiana State Road 44
- Indiana State Road 67
- Indiana State Road 252

=== Airports and landing strips ===
- McDaniels Field

=== Lakes ===
- Spring Lake

== School districts ==
- Metropolitan School District of Martinsville

== Political districts ==
- Indiana's 4th congressional district
- State House District 47
- State Senate District 37
