= Battle of Solomon's Fork =

1857 battle of the American Indian Wars

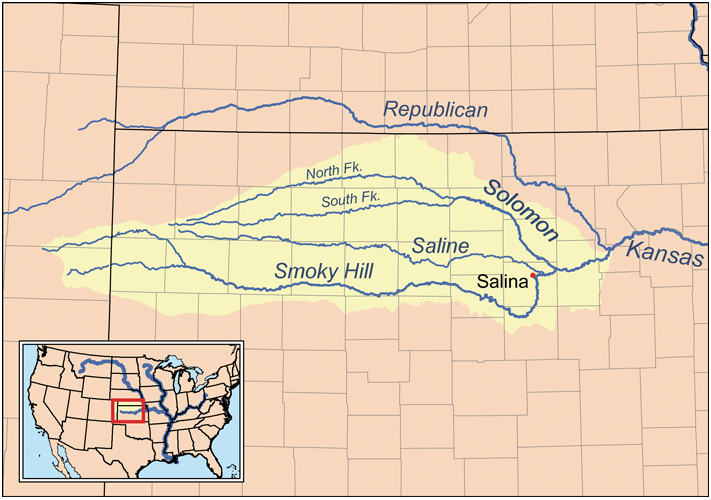
- The river where the Battle of Solomon's Fork took place
| Date | July 9, 1857 |
| Location | Solomon River, Graham County, Kansas Territory |
| Result | U.S. Cavalry victory |
| Territorial changes | Cheyenne territory along the Saline and Solomon Rivers was taken over by the U.S. government |

Combatants
| United States Army | Northern Cheyenne |

Strength
| 500 soldiers | 300 warriors |

Casualties and losses
| 2 dead, 8 wounded | 4 dead, 1 captured (later escaped) |

The Battle of Solomon’s Fork was a brief skirmish between Cheyenne warriors and a cavalry detachment of the United States Army that occurred on July 9, 1857, on the Solomon Fork of the Smoky Hill River in north-central Kansas Territory, near present-day Penokee. A punitive expedition led by Colonel Edwin "Bull" Sumner had been pursuing the Cheyenne since May in retaliation for attacks on emigrant wagon trains. A portion of Sumner's forces finally discovered a large Cheyenne war party waiting for them on the river's north bank. The cavalry charged and routed the Cheyenne, dispersing them in multiple directions, with several combatants killed on each side. The Army continued to pursue these fragmented groups from July 29 until August 18.

Being a relatively minor action, this battle is not well known by the general public, and historians debate its importance. Some say that this particular skirmish was a critical event in the history of conflict between the U.S. Army and Native Americans, while others have argued that it was merely one of hundreds of similar incidents in the white man's long, cumulative effort to dispossess the natives of their homelands.

== Background ==
In the years preceding the Battle of Solomon’s Fork, the Cheyenne people had maintained relative peace with the white settlers, who had not yet started to encroach on their territory. The entirety of the Cheyenne people at the time totaled close to 3,000 members, including 900 warriors. While the Cheyenne were peaceful with white settlers, they were often at war with other tribes. To the Cheyenne people, having a fighting spirit was encouraged and welcomed among the young men of the tribe. To be killed in battle while in their prime was seen as a great honor, and to live to old age was disagreeable.

Trouble began when the Sioux people, traditional allies of the Cheyenne, killed 31 United States Army soldiers at the Grattan Massacre in 1854. In March of 1856, Colonel William Selby Harney joined Sioux leaders at a peace meeting at Fort Pierre. This meeting included Cheyenne and Arapaho peoples as well, and Harney demanded that they all make peace with each other and withdraw from the Platte River territory. If they did not do so, they would be "wiped from the face of the earth."

The Cheyenne agreed to avoid any conflict with the United States Army. However, several events following the agreement proved that they could not. Numerous incidents, including accusations of theft from U.S. soldiers, murder of innocents on both sides of the conflict, and fear tactics perpetrated by U.S. soldiers left a great deal of tension and distrust between the two factions.

In revenge for an attack from U.S. troops that killed ten of their people and injured another eight, the Cheyenne attacked emigrant wagon trains, which led to the killing of twelve whites and the kidnapping of two. General Persifor Frazer Smith, commander of the Department of the West, demanded severe punishment for the Cheyenne attacks. At the time, the U.S. Army was busy trying to keep the peace between pro-slavery groups and Free-Staters during the Bleeding Kansas conflict, so Smith suggested a delayed operation against the Cheyenne for later the following year. Secretary of War Jefferson Davis agreed.

== Journey to Kansas ==
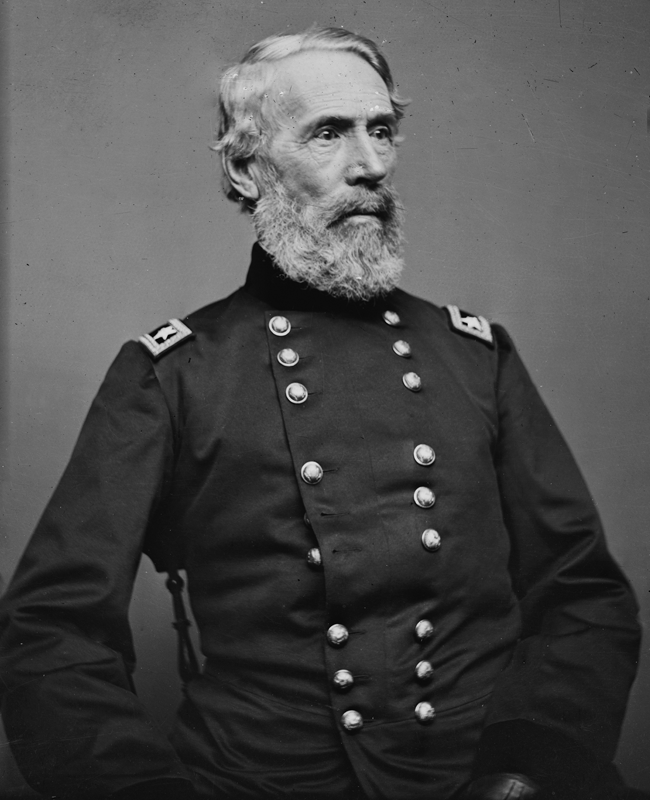
Bull Sumner

In May 1857, Colonel Edwin "Bull" Sumner led his cavalry of 300 soldiers and Pawnee scouts west from Fort Leavenworth in a punitive expedition against the Cheyenne. Major John Sedgwick took a southern route with the 1st Cavalry, forty wagons, and five Delaware scouts. Sumner’s course was supposed to lead to the west bank of the Platte and North Platte rivers, in Cheyenne territory.

In early June, Sumner's party encountered its first obstacle. The river was swollen from the heavy snowmelt from winter and freezing water. The 300 men and horses tried to cross, but several men and horses drowned on the way across. After the river disaster, the company encountered a hot and dry plain that Wagon Master Percival G. Lowe described as "thirty miles across…the hottest place this side of the Dives, and…about as dry."

On June 30, the company came across what was once a tiny stream but was now a 100-yard-wide swamp. The soldiers tracked a dirt road around the marsh, unwilling to lose more to drowning. Eventually, Sumner discovered that his two guides did not know the location of the meeting point for their other company of troops under Sedgwick.

While the U.S. troops battled the elements in search of the natives, the Cheyenne prepared for war. While on a buffalo hunt, the two sectors of the Cheyenne people discovered that the United States Army was hunting them. They decided to remain together for safety and prepare for the attack. Soon, the Delaware and Pawnee scouts discovered fresh tracks. They led Sumner on a five-day trek with only 50 men and no supplies straight to the Cheyenne encampment, where they found 300 Cheyenne had already formed a line of battle.

== Battle ==
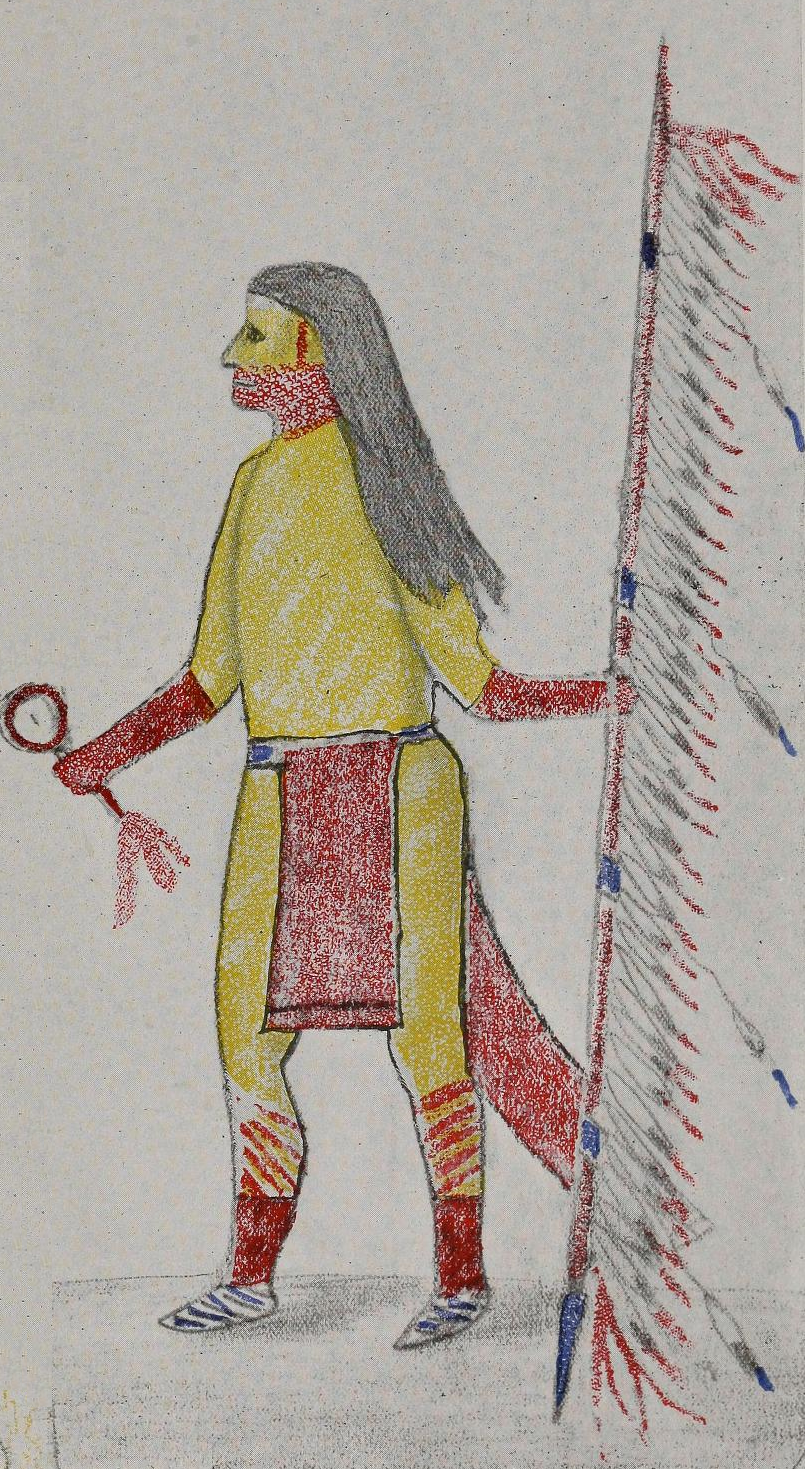
1905 drawing of a typical Cheyenne warrior

Medicine men of the Cheyenne people performed protection rituals on their warriors. They were made to believe that they would be impervious to firearms, and they calmly met Sumner and his small troop with this belief in their hearts. Sumner and his bare army decided to attack that afternoon, even though the rest of his infantry and artillery were miles behind him. Sumner and his troops pulled their sabers from their sides and charged on his command, sans firepower. In the face of blades instead of guns, the conviction of many of the Cheyenne warriors abruptly diminished.

In the battle's confusion, many soldiers and natives resorted to hand-to-hand fighting. Many Cheyenne fled to the north bank of the Saline River, their current camp, to accommodate the increased number of Cheyenne warriors. The troops and Cheyenne broke off into more minor skirmishes over a five-mile radius, most notably with Lieutenant James E. B. Stuart. Stuart came to a fellow Lieutenant and friend’s aid and was shot by a native who took his gun. Stuart survived and later became a famous cavalry commander during the American Civil War.

By the end of the battle, two U.S. soldiers had been killed and eight wounded. On the Cheyenne side, the Army reported nine killed, but the Cheyenne declared only four of their warriors dead. The battle lasted only one day, as Sumner soon received orders to send most of his cavalry to protect a Mormon expedition in Salt Lake City.

== Aftermath ==
Flag of the Northern Cheyenne

Although the U.S. Army technically won the battle, it did not bring peace to the Great Plains. While scholars still argue about the battle's importance, it was undoubtedly the first action that could be called a battle between the U.S. Army and the Cheyenne. Up to this point, the Cheyenne had deliberately avoided conflict with the U.S. government, and hostilities with white settlers had been fleeting, local, and incidental. The skirmish at Solomon's Fork was the beginning of long-term open hostility between the United States and the Cheyenne.

Subsequent skirmishes and conflicts, such as the Fort Robinson massacre and the Sand Creek massacre, left many Northern Cheyenne starving, scattered, and on the run from the U.S. military. The exodus of the Northern Cheyenne from their Southern counterparts resulted in the loss of an untold number of members, something that many Cheyenne were reluctant to talk about until several generations later.

Today, the Northern Cheyenne Reservation is located in southeastern Montana, and is approximately 444,000 acres in size. The tribe has roughly 12,266 enrolled members, about 6,012 of whom reside on the reservation.
