= Mahalasville, Indiana =

- Unincorporated community
- Location within Indiana Location within the United States
- Coordinates: 39°21′37″N 86°21′46″W
- Country: United States
- State: Indiana
- County: Morgan
- Townships: Jackson, Washington
- Elevation: 630 ft (190 m)
- Time zone: UTC-5 (Eastern (EST))
  - Summer (DST): UTC-4 (EDT)
- ZIP code: 46151
- GNIS feature ID: 438476

Mahalasville is an unincorporated community on the border of Jackson Township and Washington Township in Morgan County, Indiana.

== History ==
A post office was established at Mahalasville in 1854, and remained in operation until it was discontinued in 1928.
