= Green River (Washington) =

Green River refers to two rivers in the US state of Washington:

- Green River (Duwamish River)
- Green River (North Fork Toutle River)
