= Martinsville, Indiana =

City of Martinsville
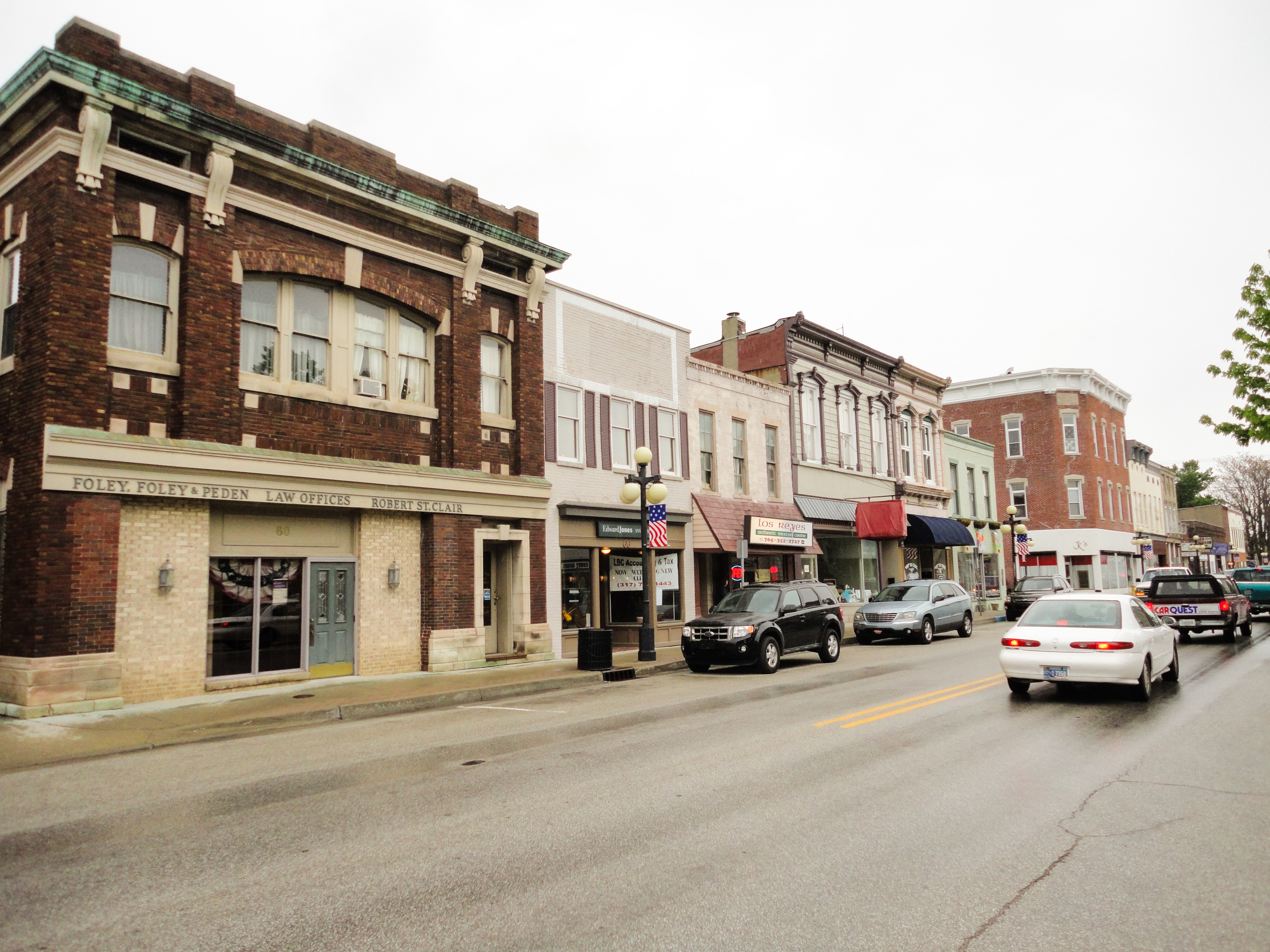
- Martinsville, Indiana

- Flag Seal
- Nicknames: "City of Mineral Water", "Goldfish Capitol of the World" “Mville”
- Location of Martinsville in Morgan County, Indiana
- Coordinates: 39°23′35″N 86°27′15″W
- Country: United States
- State: Indiana
- County: Morgan
- Township: Washington

Government
  - Mayor: Kenneth Costin

Area
  - Total: 9.27 sq mi (24.00 km^{2})
  - Land: 9.16 sq mi (23.72 km^{2})
  - Water: 0.11 sq mi (0.29 km^{2}) 0.44%
- Elevation: 604 ft (184 m)

Population (2020)
  - Total: 11,932
  - Density: 2,292.4/sq mi (885.09/km^{2})
- Time zone: UTC-5 (Eastern (EST))
  - Summer (DST): UTC-4 (EDT)
- ZIP code: 46151
- Area code: 765
- FIPS code: 18-47448
- GNIS feature ID: 2395032
- Website: www.Martinsville.IN.gov

Martinsville is a city in Washington Township, Morgan County, Indiana, United States. The population was 11,932 at the 2020 United States census. The city is the county seat of Morgan County.

== History ==
Martinsville was founded in 1822. It is said to be named for John Martin, a county commissioner. A post office has been in operation at Martinsville since 1823.

The Morgan County Courthouse, completed in 1859, features a red brick and Italianate design, and is one of the few pre-Civil War courthouses in Indiana. Architect Isaac Hodgson designed the courthouse, and it was built by Perry Magnus Blankenship. Hodgson designed six Indiana courthouses including Jennings County Courthouse (1859), Morgan County (1857), Henry County Courthouse, Bartholomew County Courthouse (1871), and his largest in Marion County, in Indianapolis.

In 1899, Eugene Shireman, a Martinsville entrepreneur, turned his swamp land into fisheries and started Grassyfork Fisheries. Once dubbed the "Goldfish Capital of the World", today Martinsville has several large fisheries that sell fish to many parts of the world. Shireman's actions changed the landscape of the Martinsville area, and his fisheries can be seen today throughout Shireman subdivision. Martinsville is also home to other fisheries.

From 1888 until 1968, visitors sought out the Martinsville's sanitaria for health benefits from their artesian mineral water. Over nearly 100 years, almost a dozen sanitaria were in operation for various periods of time, including the first black spa in Martinsville.

Albert Merritt (1871–1958), founder of the Boys' Club in Martinsville, born near Bowling Green, was the son of freedmen. He came to Martinsville Mineral Springs Sanitarium in the 1890s from a job as a porter at the Sennings Hotel in Louisville, and lived at the sanitarium for the rest of his life, never marrying. He worked with the children of Martinsville for fifty years, building a clubhouse on North Marion Street. Merritt Park on the northwest end of town is named for Albert.

Visitors would travel by rail and road to bathe and refresh in the mineral springs and waters. Many luminaries visited Martinsville in the early 20th century to enjoy the mineral waters and spas for their perceived therapeutic and restorative qualities. In 1892, the Old Hickory Furniture Company was formed. The Morgan County Public Library's Digital Archive has a collection of photographs of Old Hickory furniture including some displays for Marshall Field & Co.

In recent years, Martinsville has an array of different businesses, with the courthouse square and downtown area being host to a number of locally owned restaurants, bakeries, and shops, and areas like the Grand Valley Shopping Center and Artesian Square being host to a number of restaurant chains and retail shops. In 2014, a local judge upheld an effort by the city to annex sufficient land to increase the size of the city by a third, making I-69 the frontage road for the city.

More than a dozen Martinsville locations are listed on the National Register of Historic Places.

=== Race relations ===
Historically, Martinsville was the place of some racial conflicts, such as the 1968 murder of 20-year-old African American Carol Jenkins, who was stabbed to death with a screwdriver while selling encyclopedias door-to-door. Jenkins' murder remained unsolved for 33 years until Kenneth Richmond was arrested for the crime. Richmond was a Hendricks County resident who was passing through Martinsville on the night Jenkins was murdered. The white couple Don and Norma Neal, who called the police to try to help Carol a half-hour before she died, proposed a monument in Carol's memory on the courthouse grounds. The County Commissioners approved (2–1), the dissenting vote remarking it was the responsibility of the city not the county in the location for the monument. When many citizens contacted the commissioners later with similar feelings to that effect, the project was put on hold. In November 2017, Martinsville partnered with Carol's hometown of Rushville to hold memorial events in Carol's honor with her family present. Martinsville also dedicated a monument in Carol's memory and presented a smaller replica of the stone to Carol's family. That year, the Indianapolis Star reported that Martinsville still had a reputation among African Americans as a sundown town.

In 1998, high school basketball games in Martinsville between Martinsville High School and Bloomington High School North erupted in racist insults hurled at Bloomington players by Martinsville fans and assaults on two Bloomington players by Martinsville players. Conference Indiana banned Martinsville from hosting conference games for a year, the highest penalty ever leveled in high school sports in Indiana.

Many Martinsville residents dispute the reputation for racism and prejudice pointing out an annual award for service to the community named after a beloved African American citizen, Albert Merritt, who had a club for Martinsville boys in the 1930s.

== Geography ==
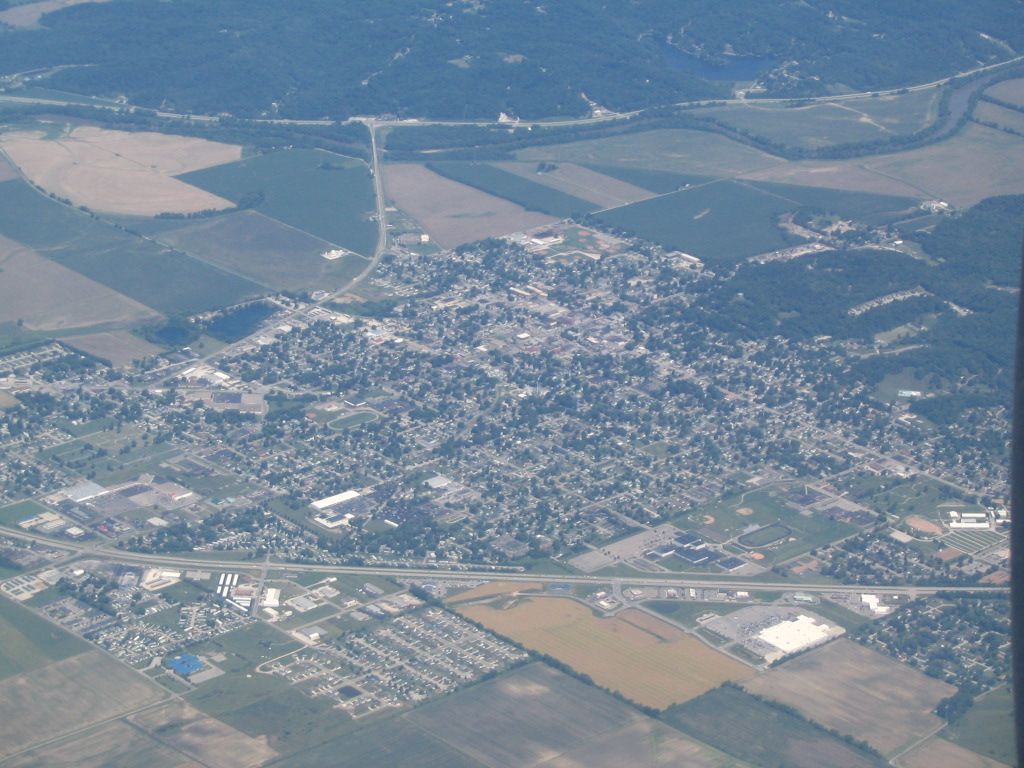
An aerial photograph of Martinsville in June 2006, taken looking northwest.

According to the 2010 census, Martinsville has a total area of 4.508 square miles (11.68 km^{2}), of which 4.49 square miles (11.63 km^{2}) (or 99.6%) is land and 0.018 square miles (0.05 km^{2}) (or 0.4%) is water.

=== Climate ===
The climate in this area is characterized by hot, humid summers and generally cool to cold winters. According to the Köppen Climate Classification system, Martinsville has a humid subtropical climate, abbreviated "Cfa" on climate maps.

== Transportation ==
=== Highways ===
- I-69 (along what was SR 37) designated September 18, 2018
- SR 39
- SR 44
- SR 67
- SR 252

=== Rail ===
- Indiana Southern Railroad

== Demographics ==
Historical population
| Census | Pop. | Note | %± |
|---|---|---|---|
| 1850 | 334 | | — |
| 1860 | 640 | | 91.6% |
| 1870 | 1,131 | | 76.7% |
| 1880 | 1,943 | | 71.8% |
| 1890 | 2,680 | | 37.9% |
| 1900 | 4,038 | | 50.7% |
| 1910 | 4,529 | | 12.2% |
| 1920 | 4,895 | | 8.1% |
| 1930 | 4,962 | | 1.4% |
| 1940 | 5,009 | | 0.9% |
| 1950 | 5,991 | | 19.6% |
| 1960 | 7,525 | | 25.6% |
| 1970 | 9,723 | | 29.2% |
| 1980 | 11,311 | | 16.3% |
| 1990 | 11,677 | | 3.2% |
| 2000 | 11,698 | | 0.2% |
| 2010 | 11,828 | | 1.1% |
| 2020 | 11,932 | | 0.9% |
U.S. Decennial Census

=== 2020 census ===
As of the 2020 census, Martinsville had a population of 11,932. The median age was 39.4 years. 22.7% of residents were under the age of 18 and 18.0% of residents were 65 years of age or older. For every 100 females there were 99.4 males, and for every 100 females age 18 and over there were 97.2 males age 18 and over.

99.0% of residents lived in urban areas, while 1.0% lived in rural areas.

There were 4,884 households in Martinsville, of which 29.1% had children under the age of 18 living in them. Of all households, 38.8% were married-couple households, 20.6% were households with a male householder and no spouse or partner present, and 31.6% were households with a female householder and no spouse or partner present. About 33.3% of all households were made up of individuals and 15.2% had someone living alone who was 65 years of age or older.

There were 5,281 housing units, of which 7.5% were vacant. The homeowner vacancy rate was 2.4% and the rental vacancy rate was 8.9%.

Racial composition as of the 2020 census
| Race | Number | Percent |
|---|---|---|
| White | 11,155 | 93.5% |
| Black or African American | 63 | 0.5% |
| American Indian and Alaska Native | 31 | 0.3% |
| Asian | 45 | 0.4% |
| Native Hawaiian and Other Pacific Islander | 0 | 0.0% |
| Some other race | 126 | 1.1% |
| Two or more races | 512 | 4.3% |
| Hispanic or Latino (of any race) | 285 | 2.4% |

=== 2010 census ===
As of the census of 2010, there were 11,828 people, 7,910 households, and 6,990 families living in the city. The population density was 3,634.3 inhabitants per square mile (1,403.2/km^{2}). There were 5,973 housing units at an average density of 1,129.8 per square mile (436.2/km^{2}). The racial makeup of the city was 97.5% White, 0.2% African American, 0.3% Native American, 0.4% Asian, 0.1% Pacific Islander, 0.5% from other races, and 1.0% from two or more races. Hispanic or Latino people of any race were 1.3% of the population.

There were 7,610 households, of which 33.6% had children under the age of 18 living with them, 44.0% were married couples living together, 14.3% had a female householder with no husband present, 6.5% had a male householder with no wife present, and 35.1% were non-families. 29.5% of all households were made up of individuals, and 12.9% had someone living alone who was 65 years of age or older. The average household size was 2.47 and the average family size was 3.03.

The median age in the city was 36.6 years. 25% of residents were under the age of 18; 10.2% were between the ages of 18 and 24; 25.8% were from 25 to 44; 24.4% were from 45 to 64; and 14.5% were 65 years of age or older. The gender makeup of the city was 48.6% male and 51.4% female.

=== 2000 census ===
As of the census of 2000, there were 11,698 people, 7,921 households, and 6,086 families living in the city. The population density was 3,620.6 inhabitants per square mile (1,397.9/km^{2}). There were 5,880 housing units at an average density of 1,093.2 per square mile (422.1/km^{2}). The racial makeup of the city was 98.62% White, 0.01% African American, 0.27% Native American, 0.18% Asian, 0.04% Pacific Islander, 0.25% from other races, and 0.56% from two or more races. Hispanic or Latino people of any race were 1.00% of the population.

There were 7,921 households, out of which 40.0% had children under the age of 18 living with them, 50.8% were married couples living together, 11.5% had a female householder with no husband present, and 33.2% were non-families. 28.8% of all households were made up of individuals, and 12.7% had someone living alone who was 65 years of age or older. The average household size was 2.42 and the average family size was 2.96.

In the city, the population was spread out, with 25.1% under the age of 18, 9.6% from 18 to 24, 29.3% from 25 to 44, 20.9% from 45 to 64, and 15.1% who were 65 years of age or older. The median age was 35 years. For every 100 females, there were 96.2 males. For every 100 females age 18 and over, there were 89.6 males.

The median income for a household in the city was $32,746, and the median income for a family was $40,304. Males had a median income of $31,215 versus $22,090 for females. The per capita income for the city was $17,664. About 8.7% of families and 11.6% of the population were below the poverty line, including 12.8% of those under age 18 and 16.4% of those age 65 or over.

== Culture ==
- Fall Foliage Festival
- Martinsville on the Square
- Farmer's Market Day
- Morgan County Fair
- Morgan County Relay for Life
- Artie Fest
- Art Sanctuary of Indiana
- Merry MAC Players Community Theatre
- Martinsville Community Band
- Morgan County Antique Machinery Show

== Education ==
The Metropolitan School District of Martinsville administers the public schools of Martinsville. Elementary schools include pre-kindergarten through 4th grade. Elementary schools are Brooklyn STEM Academy, Centerton Elementary, Green Township Elementary, Paragon Elementary, Poston Road Spanish Immersion School, Charles L. Smith Fine Arts Academy and South Elementary School of Communications. 5th and 6th grades go to Bell Intermediate Academy, while grades 7th and 8th attend John R. Wooden Middle School. Grades 9th through 12th go to Martinsville High School. There is also the Artesian Center of Excellence (A.C.E) formerly Hammons off-campus community school. Martinsville has one private school, Tabernacle Christian School, which has classes for preschool through twelfth grade.

Martinsville has a public library, a branch of the Morgan County Public Library.

== Notable people ==
- Josh Allison, racing driver
- Emmett Forrest Branch, 31st governor of Indiana
- William G. Bray, US House of Representatives
- Richard Bray, Indiana state senator
- Benjamin Bull, lawyer and Wisconsin state senator
- Glenn M. Curtis, basketball coach
- Charles E. Ford, newsreel and motion picture director
- Ira Hall, Indy car driver
- Bobby Helms, singer/songwriter who had six gold records
- Joe W. Kelly, United States Air Force four-star general
- Jeff Kottkamp, lieutenant governor of Florida (2007–2011)
- Paul V. McNutt, 34th governor of Indiana
- Mel Payton, former professional basketball player
- Catt Sadler, former E! News anchor
- Jerry Sichting, former professional basketball player
- Kayana Traylor, Women's professional basketball player current WNBA player for the Indiana Fever
- John R. Walsh, U.S. congressman and Secretary of State of Indiana (1958–1960)
- John C. Wetherby, recipient of the Medal of Honor
- John Wooden, Naismith Hall of Fame college basketball player and coach

== See also ==
- List of sundown towns in the United States
