= Henry H. Dupont =

American architect

- Occupation: Architect
- Buildings: Bona Thompson Memorial Library; Hall School; Don CeSar Hotel; Casa De Muchas Flores
- Projects: Von Duprin

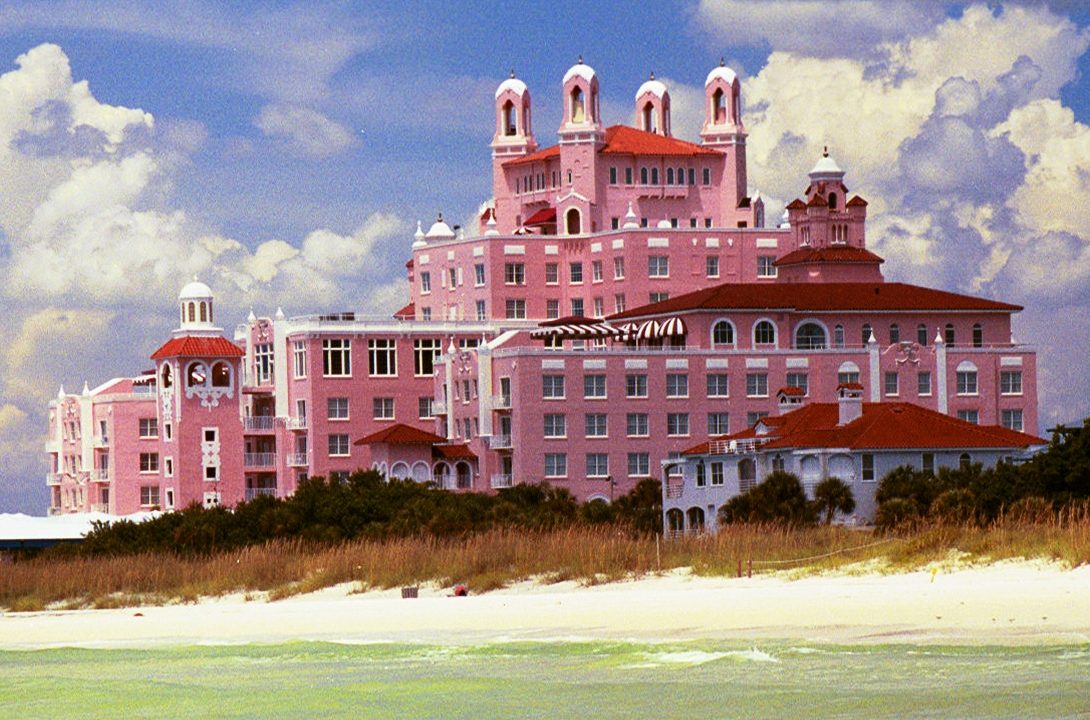
Don CeSar Hotel on St. Pete Beach

Henry H. Dupont was an American architect. He practiced from Indianapolis, Indiana, and then Pinellas County, Florida after relocating there in 1915.

== Career ==
DuPont trained for several years under many of the best architects in the Midwest before he traveled to Paris, France and graduated from the Ecole de Beaux Arts.

DuPont designed Bona Thompson Memorial Library in Irvington, Indiana, the eclectic Masonic Temple and Hall School.

Dupont, along with Carl Prinzler, the Manager of the Builders Hardware Department at the Vonnegut Hardware Company developed the first "panic bar" device for doors which can be pushed to open the door from the inside despite being locked on the outside. This invention was born out of necessity after a fire broke out in the Iroquois Theatre in Chicago in 1903 and claimed 600 lives. Many of the deaths were attributed to exit doors being latched and panicked crowds being unable to open inward-swinging doors due to audience members surging forward in an attempt to escape. After patenting this hardware, the device became known under the trade name Von Duprin, a blend of the three principals surnames, VONnegut, DUpont, PRINzler. In 1910, Vonnegut Hardware Company began to sell the Von Duprin Safe Exit Device; not long after many public buildings in Indianapolis implemented the panic bar, setting standards that the rest of the nation too would soon follow.

Dupont announced his move to Florida in 1915, with an office in St. Petersburg's Central National Bank Building. In Pinellas County, Florida, he designed the Don CeSar Hotel and Casa De Muchas Flores.

== Works ==
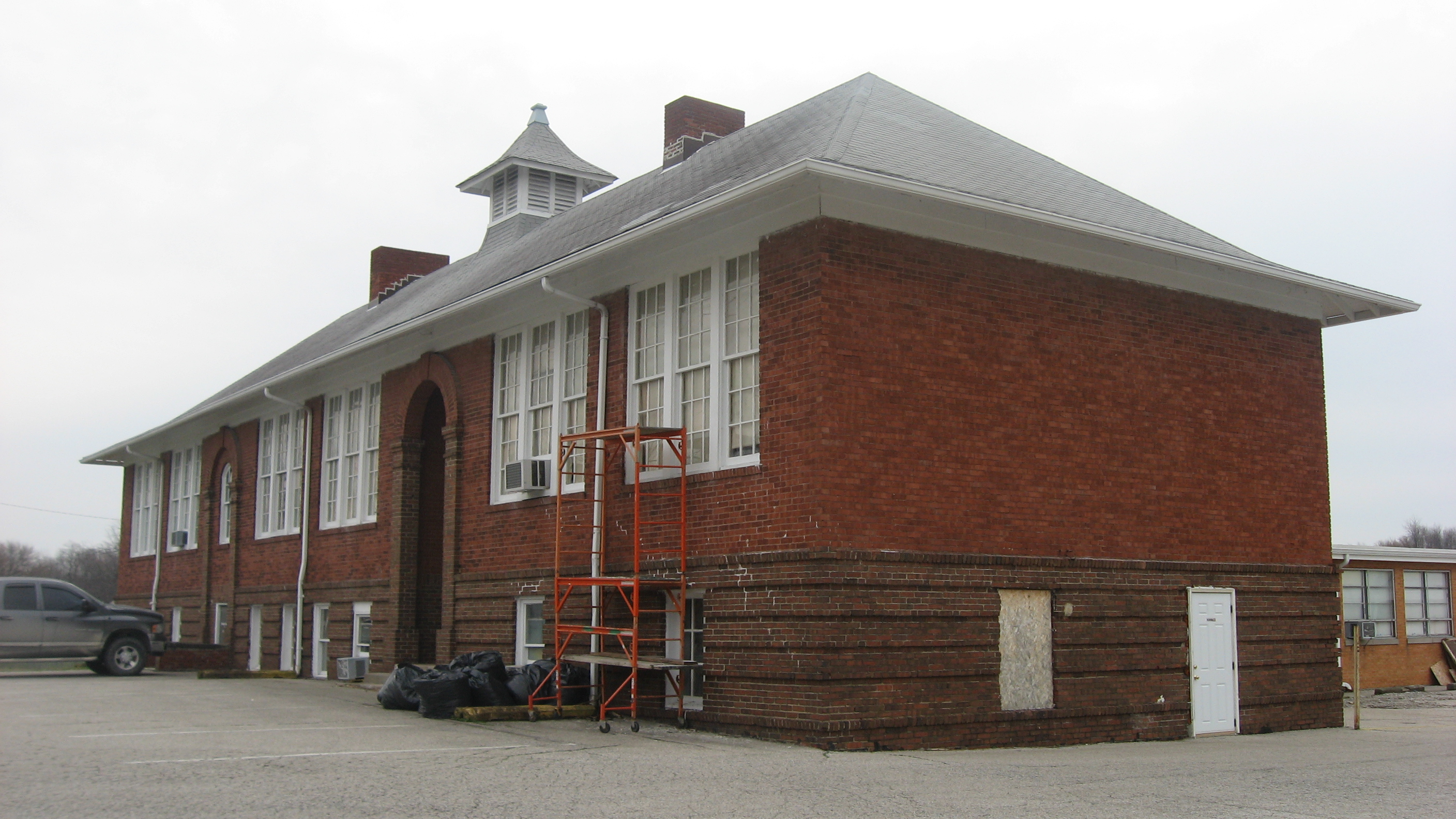
Hall School in Hall, Indiana

- Hall School
- Casa De Muchas Flores, Pinellas County, Florida
- Veillard House (1901) for Ralph Veillard, a Queen Anne style bungalow listed on the National Register of Historic Places in 1982. Two-story masonry and balloon frame house with a front porch and bell-cast gable roof punctuated by two oversized dormers on a corner lot on 4th Ave N in downtown St Petersburg, Florida.
- Edward T. Lewis home, St. Petersburg
