= Crash bar =

Locking mechanism

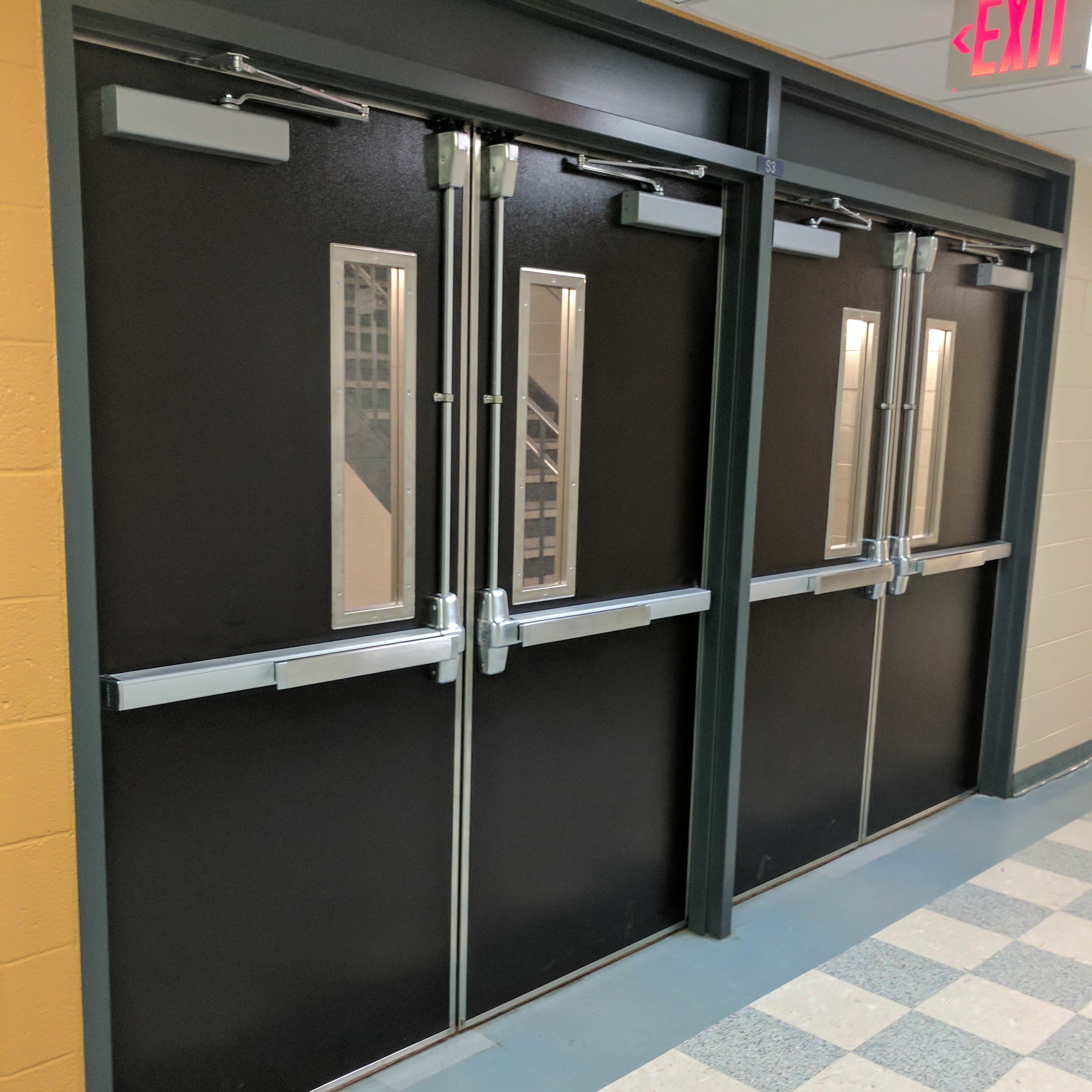
Crash bar doors in a school, with exposed upper vertical rod latches

A crash bar (also known as a panic exit device, panic bar, or bump bar) is a type of door opening mechanism which allows users to open a door by pushing a bar. While originally conceived as a way to prevent crowd crushing in an emergency, crash bars are now used as the primary door opening mechanism in many commercial buildings.

The device consists of a spring-loaded metal bar which is fixed horizontally to a door that swings in the direction of an exit. Depressing the bar unlatches the door, allowing occupants to quickly leave the building.

Modern fire standards often mandate that doors be fitted with crash bars in commercial and other occupancies where mass evacuation may be slowed by other types of door openers.

They are sometimes intended solely for emergency use and may be fitted with alarms. However, in many buildings the crash bar is the primary mechanism for opening a door in normal circumstances as well. They may even be used when not required by code, because they are quicker and easier to use compared with a knob or lever handle.

== Background ==
=== History ===
Following the events of the Victoria Hall disaster in Sunderland, England, in 1883 in which 183 children died because a door had been bolted at the bottom of a stairwell, the British government began legal moves to enforce minimum standards for building safety. This slowly led to the legal requirement that venues must have a minimum number of outward opening doors as well as locks which could be opened from the inside. Motivated by the Victoria Hall disaster, Robert Alexander Briggs (1868–1963) invented the panic bolt mechanism with horizontal bar which was granted a UK patent on 13 August 1892.

However, these moves were not globally copied. For example, in the United States, at least 602 people died in the Iroquois Theatre fire in Chicago in December 1903 because of door latch designs that were difficult for fleeing patrons to open. A survivor of the Iroquois Theater fire, Carl Prinzler, along with architect Henry H. Dupont, independently developed and were awarded a series of nine patents relating to new and improved exit door hardware. All of the patent designs focused on a single lever bar (and related hardware) that would cause a locked door to pop open when simple interior pressure was exerted upon it. The bar would be mounted waist high from the ground. Five years later, 174 people in Ohio died in the Collinwood school fire, which led to a national outcry in the United States for greater fire safety in buildings.

On 31 December 1929, some 37 years after the panic bolt was patented, 71 children died during the Glen Cinema disaster at a Hogmanay film screening in Paisley, Renfrewshire, Scotland, when a smoking cellulose nitrate film canister sparked panic. Children rushing to escape the cinema became crushed against the padlocked exit doors. Even after a police officer broke a padlock, the inward-opening doors were held shut by the mass of bodies behind them.

=== Justification for use ===
In virtually all [crowd crush] situations it is usually the authorities to blame for poor planning, poor design, poor control, poor policing and mismanagement.

— Edwin Galea, professor of fire safety engineering at the University of Greenwich, England

By the end of the 20th century, most countries had building codes (or regulations) which require all public buildings have a minimum number of fire and emergency exits. Crash bars are fitted to these types of doors because they are proven to save lives in the event of human crushes. Panic can often occur during mass building evacuations caused by fires or explosions.

In the event emergency exits are required, the crash bar works efficiently to allow people to pass through security doors without a reduction in speed. A crash bar's fast-acting mechanism reduces the risk that a rushing crowd might suddenly become a logjam at the exits. Such a human crush, which has many historical precedents, can cause falls, crushing, and other injury because the rear of a crowd has no idea that the people at the front of a crowd are impeded by a door.

Crash bars are typically found on doors which are required emergency exits serving a particular type or quantity of occupants. Common locations include doors which provide egress from assembly areas, doors which serve many occupants, or doors serving hazardous areas. For buildings subject to the International Building Code or a locally adopted variation, they are required for certain healthcare, education, or assembly spaces, generally related to the number of occupants expected to exit quickly through a given door.

== Latching ==
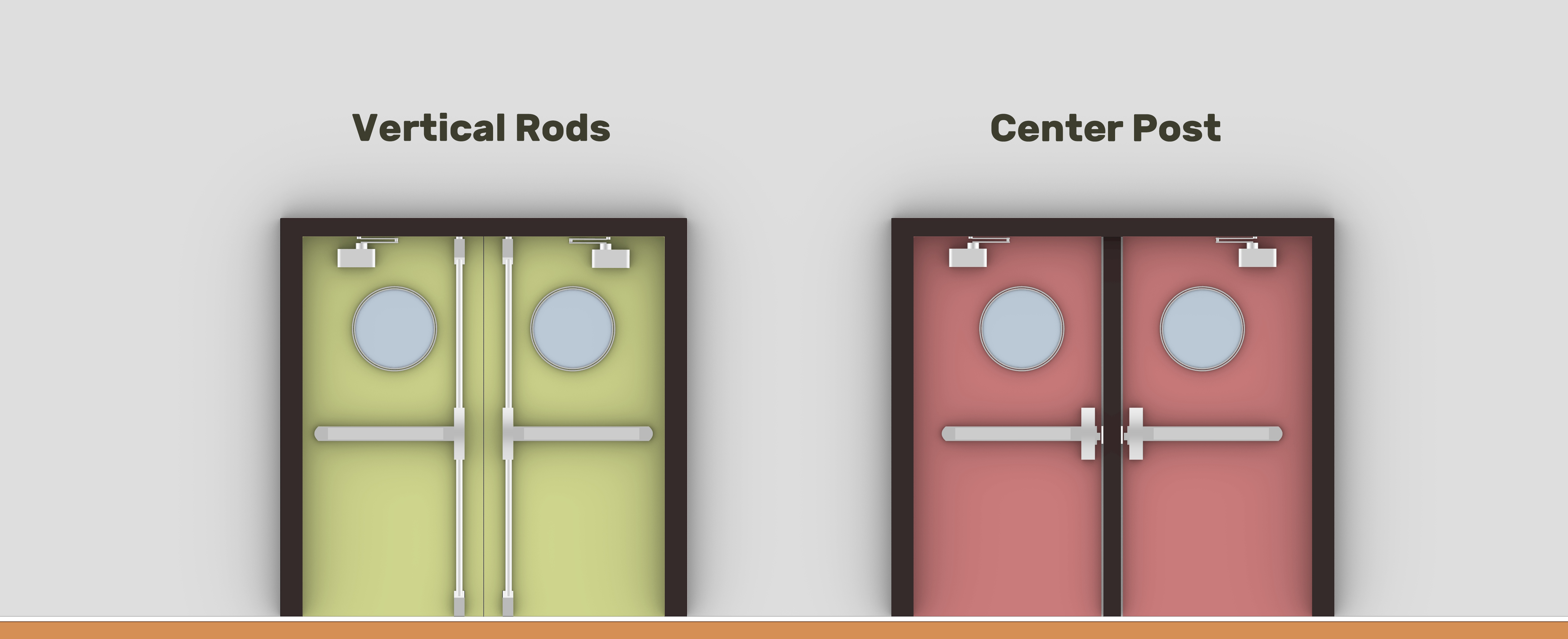
Vertical rod vs center post latching

Crash bars offer several configurations for latching to the door frame.

Vertical rods can be affixed to crash bars allowing both doors to be opened with no center clearance obstruction. When the bar is depressed, a cord within the vertical rod gets pulled, which lowers a latch at the top and/or bottom and allows the door to open. The Pullman latch, which attaches to a Pullman keeper, is the locking mechanism usually used at the ends of the vertical rods. More expensive products may feature vertical rods and latches concealed within the door.

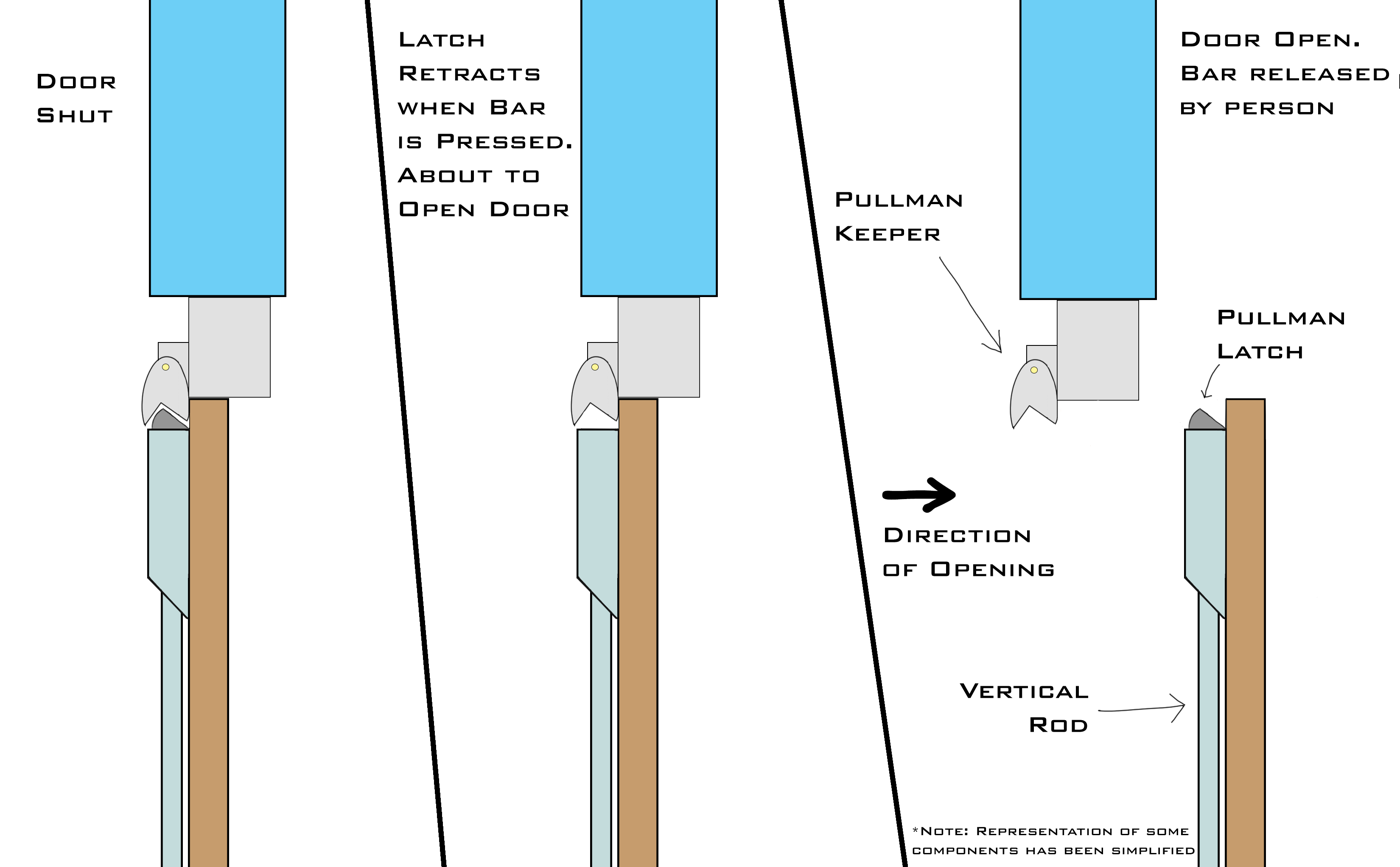
Diagram of Vertical Rod Latching Elements

Some jurisdictions permit doors to latch to each other. For security, additional latching points may be added. For example, upper and lower vertical rods added to one door and connected to the leaf with no rods via a mortice latch. A double door coordinator is used to ensure the active leaf does not close before the inactive leaf. This configuration is not recommended for high traffic locations.

Center posts are an alternative to vertical rods at double door exits. This offers less clearance because the post remains in the middle when both doors are open. That said, the post can often be removed with a key for occasions when items larger than a single door need to pass through. Center posts may be preferred over vertical rods because they have fewer moving parts, thus they have fewer components that can wear out or break.

Push bars themselves are some of the most reliable door opening mechanisms. To pass CE certification, bars must function between 100,000 and 500,000 opening cycles depending on the rating the manufacturer is seeking.

=== Unlocking and latch hold ===
In some applications, such as storefront entrances, panic bars may be "dogged" during business hours. Dogging is a common feature on panic bars in which the bar is retracted with a key, thus freeing the door to operate without latching. This allows customers to apply force to any portion of the door, not just the bar, in order to open it.

Dogging is distinct from simple unlocking, which permits the user to open the door from both sides but still requires performing an action to release the latches. However, in applications where the exterior side contains an immovable dummy handle, as opposed to a knob or lever handle, it is usually impossible to unlock the crash bar without also dogging it.

Dogging can extend the life of the panic bar mechanism. Some bars can be unlocked/dogged electronically, while others take a cylinder lock, hex key, or contain no key functionality at all. Dogging should be avoided in high wind areas where the door is susceptible to blowing open.

=== Electronic Touch Bar ===
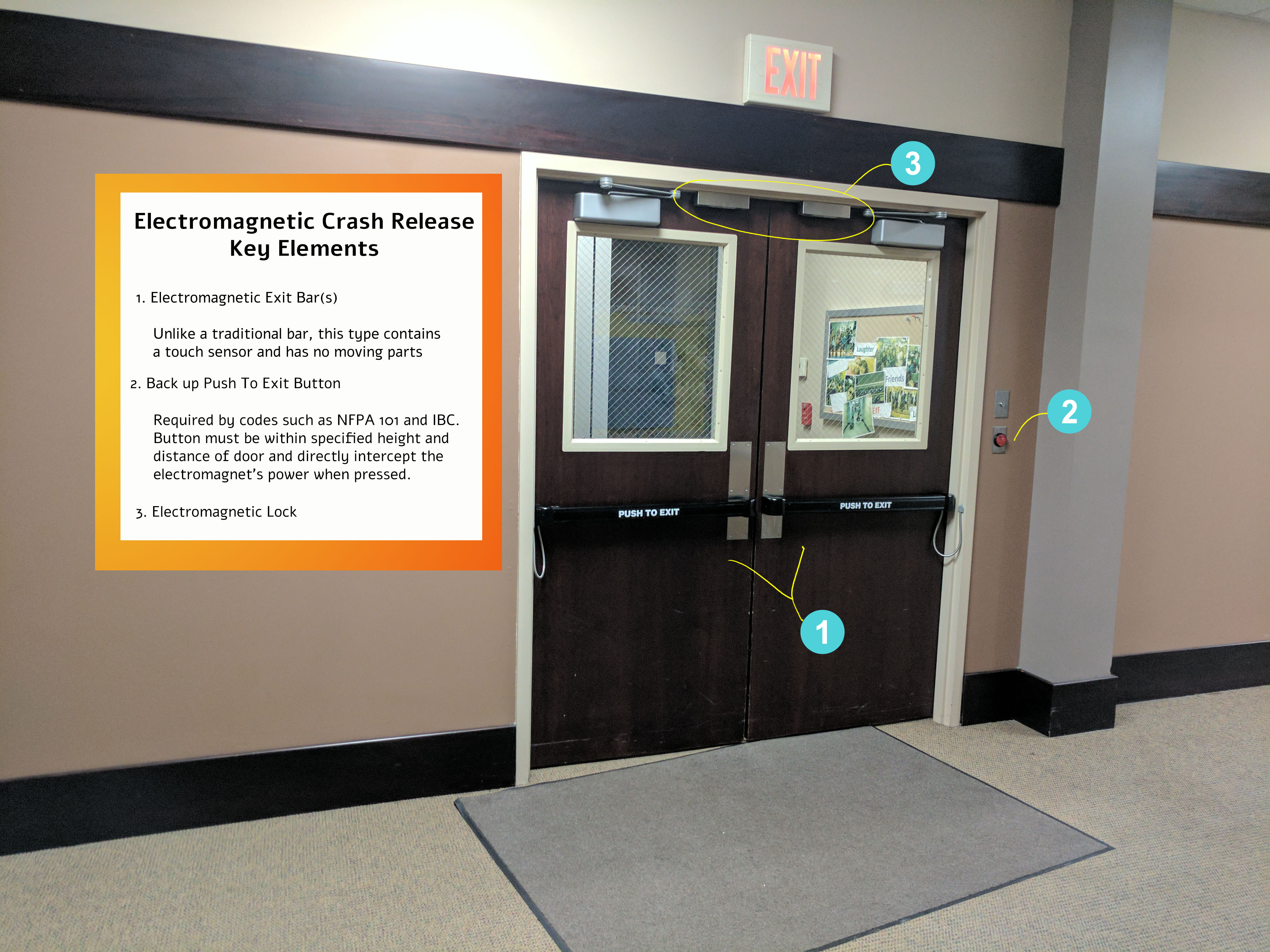
Doors with electromagnetic exit bars

Unlike a traditional crash bar, this type contains a horizontal touch sensor and no moving parts. When the sensor is pressed, it releases an electromagnetic lock. It may be used in tandem with a motion sensor which unlocks for anyone who stands in front of the door, or an emergency exit button. This type of release must still unlock in the event of a power failure, and in some jurisdictions, the door must automatically unlock for a fire alarm activation, must unlock for a duration of thirty (30) seconds upon each unlock duration, and must not have secondary power, such as a battery backup. Because these will not function in a long term power outage, they are most commonly used on secondary doors between a vestibule and the secure part of a building.

=== On automatic doors ===
In some jurisdictions, when automatic doors are used on the primary exit route, these doors are equipped with crash bars. In the event the automatic door does not function, it becomes an outward swinging rather than sliding door. Crash bars are one of many emergency release mechanisms that can be used with automatic doors. Depending on available space, a common alternative is to install an emergency exit door beside the automatic doors. Installation of a secondary crash bar equipped exit is often required in large buildings with revolving doors, since these are too slow for a crowd to move through.

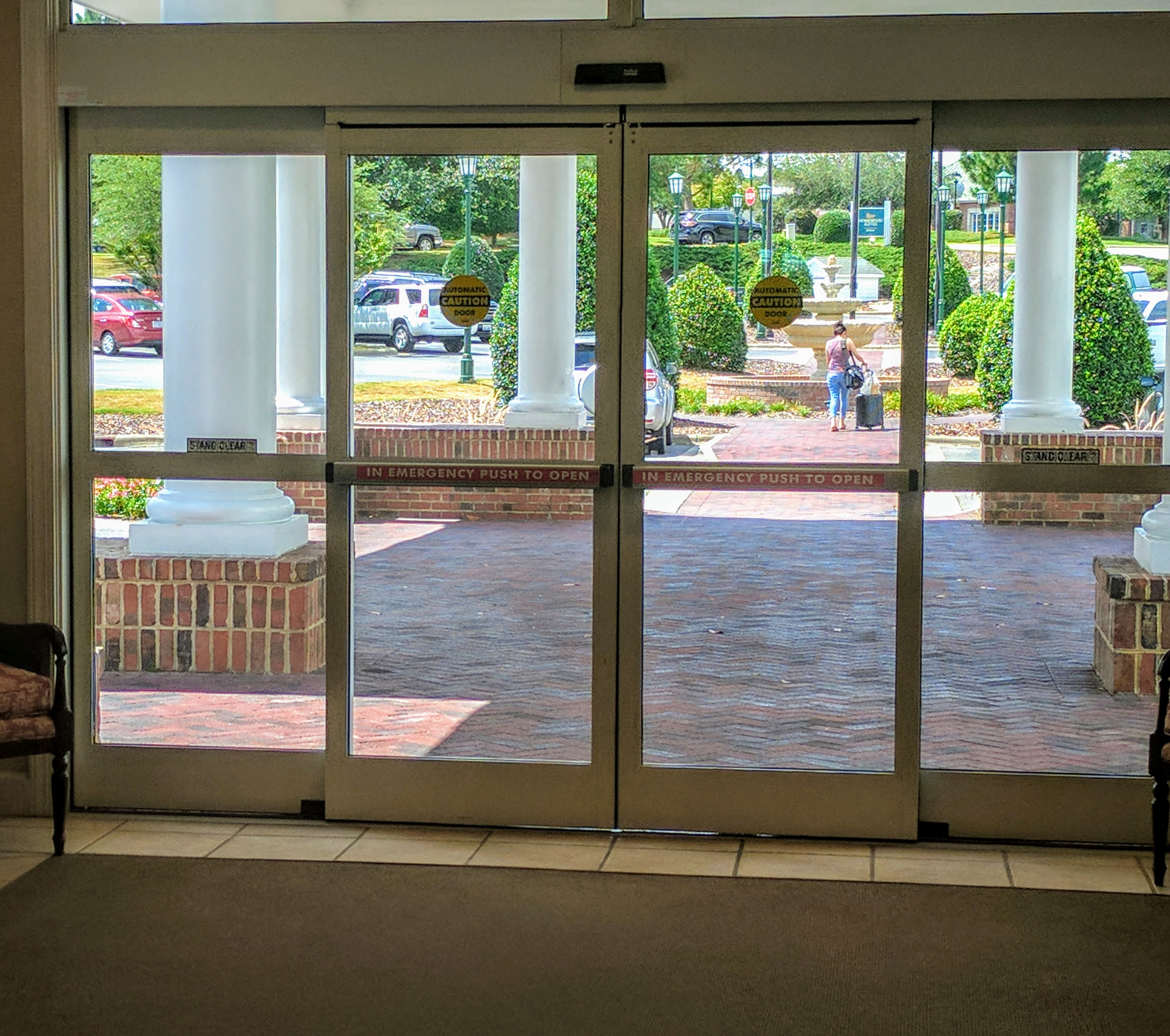
Automatic sliding doors with crash bars

== Around the world ==
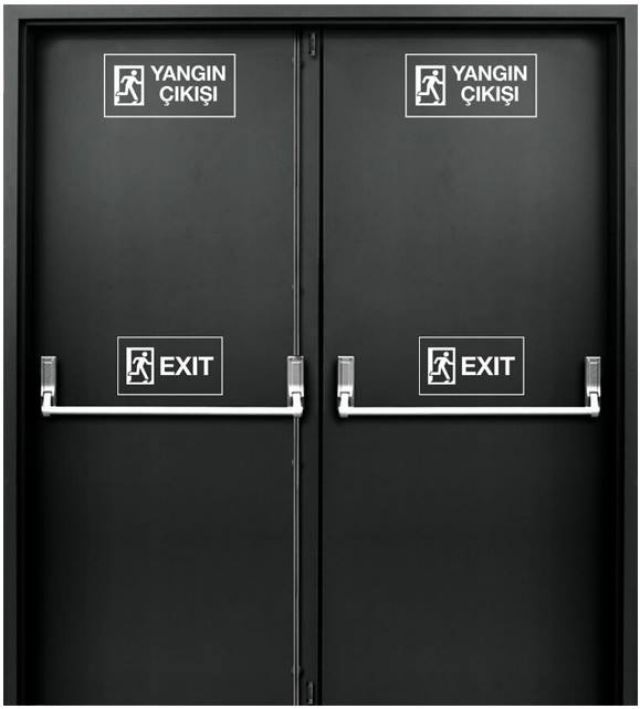
Cross bar style exit doors in Turkey

=== European Union ===
In the European Union, panic bars are governed by the standard EN 1125, Panic exit devices operated by a horizontal bar. As with other EN family standards, the English language version is produced by the British Standards Institution and utilises the call sign BS EN 1125. Panic bars are required to conform to this standard in order to carry CE marking and thus be sold in the European Economic Area.

In 2008, the standard was updated to include an alpha-numeric labelling scheme. In this system, products are tested to various benchmarks and assigned a letter or number accordingly. Products must achieve minimum quality scores in order to receive general CE approval. The nine rating categories are:

1. Category of Use
2. Number of Test Cycles
3. Test Door Mass
4. Fire Resistance
5. Safety
6. Corrosion Resistance
7. Security
8. Projection of device
9. Type of device

EN 1125 is one of two standards which govern exit devices in the EU. The other standard, EN 179, governs door handles, push pads, and other exit devices with emergency release functionality.

However, EN 179 devices shall only be used at locations where people "are familiar with the emergency exit and its hardware and therefore a panic situation is unlikely to appear". Examples of places where EN 179 hardware may be used in place of EN 1125 panic bars include small apartment buildings and offices.

=== United States ===
The first panic bar, made by Von Duprin, was available by 1908 in many models and configurations.

In the US, building exit requirements are generally controlled by model codes such as the International Building Code and the NFPA Life Safety Code. Adoption of regulations varies by location and may occur at the city, county, or state level.

Model codes are usually supplemented with amendments adopted locally. Additional requirements may be imposed on a site from an authority having jurisdiction such as a local fire marshal. Factors considered when mandating exit devices include the number of occupants who would need to leave in an emergency, the availability of other nearby exits, and proximity to any hazards equipment or chemicals.

=== Differences between Europe and North America and emerging trends ===
In Europe, most panic bars are of the cross bar type, which are called Type A in the EN 1125 standard. This contrasts strongly with North American architectural design, which years ago switched to using predominantly touch bars (EN 1125 Type B) in new construction.

In Europe, the use of panic bars is generally confined to code required applications. In US and Canadian commercial buildings, they are frequently used even where not required by code, because bars are seen as being easier to use than knobs or lever handles. For example, when used on the rear service door of a business, a worker whose hands are being used to carry bulky items can lean against a bar to release the lock.

While the public generally prefers automatic doors, they can be costly to install and maintain.

Some manufacturers offer crash bars designed to resist microbial growth. This can include coating the bar with silver ions in order to create a chemical environment hostile to unwanted microbes. Antimicrobial surfaces have shown to be effective at inhibiting bacterial, mold, and mildew growth; but may not be effective at stopping viruses such as SARS-CoV-2.

== See also ==
- Crowd collapses and crushes – Type of disaster that occurs due to overcrowding
