= Veillard =

Veillard may refer to:

== People ==
- Jean-Yves Veillard (1939–2020), French historian
- Thomas Veillard (born 1996), Guernsey cricketer

== Other uses ==
- Veillard House, house in Florida
