= Hall School =

Hall School may refer to:

- Fred P. Hall Elementary School, Maine, US
- Hall School Wimbledon, England
- Hall School (Hall, Indiana), US
- The Hall School, Hampstead, England
