= Carl Prinzler =

American engineer and inventor

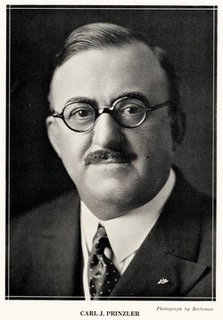

Carl Jacob Prinzler (June 6, 1870 – May 30, 1949) was an American engineer who invented the "panic bar" device for doors that allowed them to be opened from the inside despite being locked on the outside. He was manager of the Builders Hardware Department at the Vonnegut Hardware Company in 1903, when, along with his architect and engineer neighbor Henry H. DuPont, he developed the first panic bar.

== Biography ==
Prinzler was born in Indianapolis to German immigrants. In 1886, Prinzler, then 16 years of age, found employment as a sales clerk at the Lilly and Stalnaker Hardware Company in downtown Indianapolis. Prinzler would later recall that, as a naive young man with no real hardware experience, he once mistakenly sold a wash machine to a female customer in search of a butter churn. The following year, 1887, Prinzler would change employment to the Vonnegut Hardware Company which was located nearby at 342 E. Washington Street.

In 1895, Prinzler was promoted to manager of the firm's art hardware and building materials department.

In 1898, Vonnegut would move its retail store into a building located at 120-124 W. Washington Street. Prinzler maintained an office in this building over most of his Vonnegut career.

Prinzler had been in Chicago on December 30, 1903, and, by some fortunate twist of fate, escaped becoming a victim of the tragic Iroquois Theatre Fire which claimed 600 lives. Prinzler, personally moved by the experience and loss of life, committed his thinking to developing door hardware that could remain locked from the outside while allowing safe and reliable emergency exit to people on the inside. Working with his neighbor, Henry H. DuPont, an Indianapolis architect, the two men developed and were awarded a series of nine patents relating to new and improved exit door hardware. All of the patent designs focused on a single lever bar (and related hardware) that would cause a locked door to pop open when simple interior pressure was exerted upon it. The bar would be mounted waist high from the ground.

Circa 1908, Prinzler, Dupont and the Vonnegut Hardware Company entered into an arrangement providing for the manufacture, marketing and distribution of the patent protected hardware. Under the trade name Von Duprin (a blend of the three principals names, VONnegut, DUpont, PRINzler) the Von Duprin Safe Exit Device, as it was called, was manufactured and distributed by the Vonnegut Hardware Company. Manufacturing took place in Indianapolis (also in Chicago and Canada in later years). In 1908, Prinzler was named manager over the manufacturing process. He was elected to the Board of Directors of Vonnegut in 1910. Dupont would continue his career as an architect and would leave an impressive legacy.

Through an extensive, national network of independent sales representatives, the Von Duprin Safe Exit Devices were widely sold and installed in schools, hospitals, theaters, public assembly buildings, and other public and private buildings throughout the United States and in some foreign countries.

Prinzler was proud of his affiliation with the Vonnegut Hardware Company and the Vonnegut family. His employment there spanned over 50 years. He continued to manage the manufacturing process and serve as a director of the company until his retirement.

Prinzler resided at 3535 N. Central Avenue, Indianapolis. He was a member of the Indianapolis Athenaeum, the Hardware Age Club, the Shriners, the Scottish Rite and the Peniaipha Masonic Lodge. Prinzler died in Indianapolis on May 30, 1949 (aged 78) and was interred in Crown Hill Cemetery, Indianapolis.
