= Indiana Jewish Historical Society =

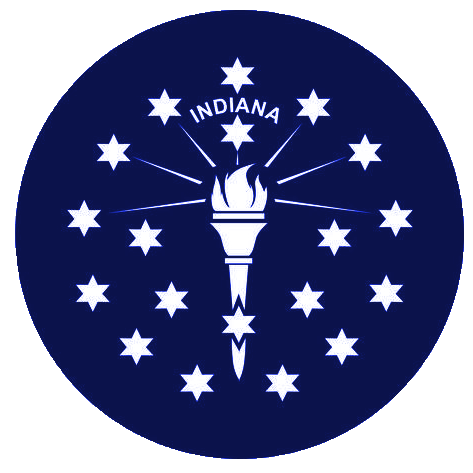
- Founded: 1972
- Purpose: History, judaism
- Location: Indianapolis, Indiana, United States
- Region served: United States
- Key people: Melanie Hughes (president), Michael Brown (executive director)
- Website: ijhs.org

The Indiana Jewish Historical Society is a 501(c)3 not-for-profit educational organization with a stated goal to collect, preserve, publish, and share the Jewish experience in Indiana.

The Indiana Jewish Historical Society, or IJHS, was founded in Fort Wayne, Indiana, in 1972. The Indiana Jewish Historical Society's first Executive Director was Joseph Levine who formerly was the executive director of the Fort Wayne Jewish Federation. The IJHS was launched with help from B'nai Brith and financial support from the Lilly Endowment. In 2017, the Indiana Jewish Historical Society moved its headquarters from Fort Wayne to Indianapolis, where they remain today.

== Archives ==
IJHS's archival holdings, representing Indiana's entire state, have been housed at the Indiana Historical Society in Indianapolis since 1999. The IJHS collection contains thousands of Jewish life items across the state, and the society continues to seek materials for the collection. The IJHS also promotes and encourages the preservation of historically Jewish buildings, markers, and cemeteries.

== Publications ==
The IJHS publishes a quarterly newsletter, The Historical News, and the journal Indiana Jewish History.

== Programs ==
The society hosts history education programming of interest to the Indiana Jewish Community, including Holocaust Education, such as 2021's Hoosiers and the Holocaust program. Society staff and members also participate in historical radio and podcast programming.

The IJHS engages in community advocacy supporting preservation of historic buildings of interest to the Jewish community, such as the recently protected Loeb Mansion.

== Awards ==
The society hosts an annual program and the Hoosier Jewish Legends Awards, a hall of fame program honoring eminent Hoosiers who influenced Jewish life in Indiana through their work and life.

== Funding ==
An endowment was established in January 2002 to sustain the IJHS, but the organization still relies on and seeks public support for its programs and services.

== See also ==
- List of historical societies in Indiana
