= The Don CeSar =

Architectural structure in St. Pete Beach, Florida

Don CeSar Hotel
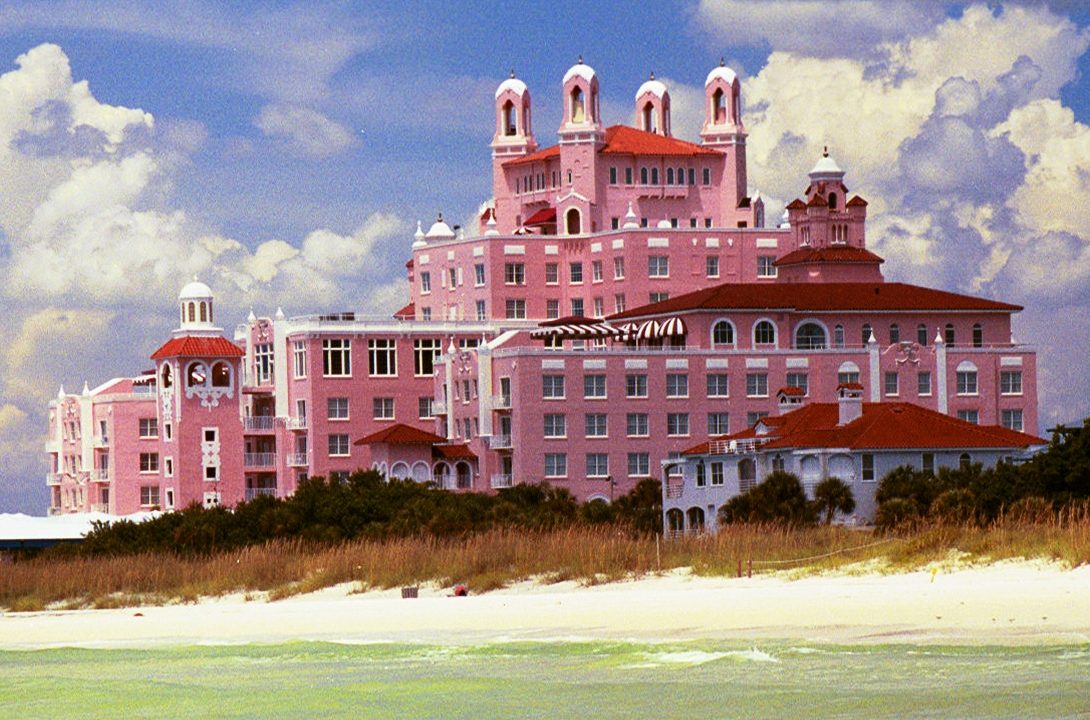

General information
- Location: St. Pete Beach, Pinellas County, Florida
- Opening: January 16, 1928
- Operator: Host Hotels & Resorts

Technical details
- Floor area: 40,000 square feet (3,700 m^{2})

Design and construction
- Architect: Henry H. Dupont
- Developer: Thomas Rowe

Other information
- Number of rooms: 277
- Number of suites: 40
- Number of restaurants: 3

Website
- www.doncesar.com
- Don CeSar Hotel
- U.S. National Register of Historic Places
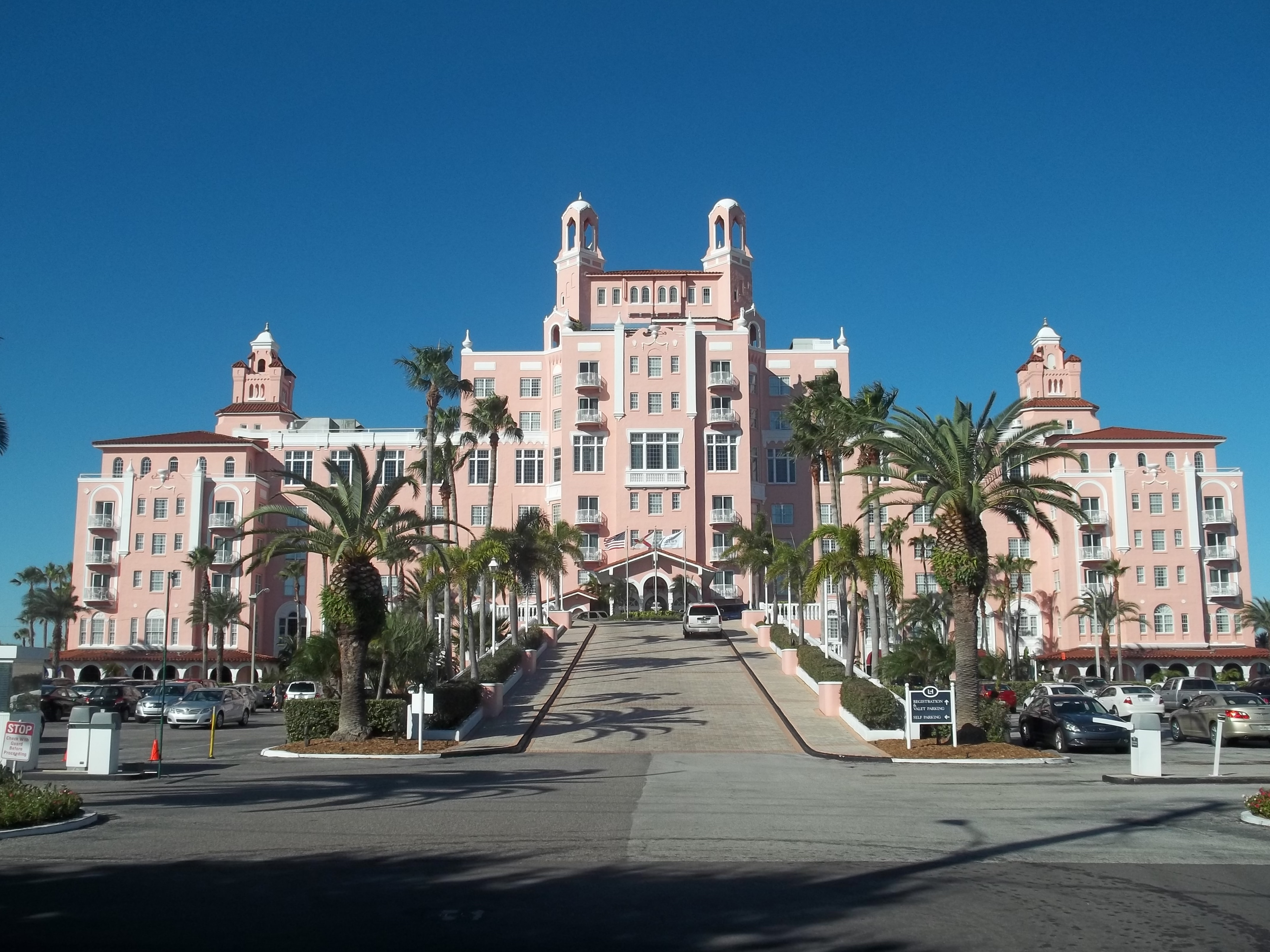

- Location within Florida Location within the United States
- Coordinates: 27°42′32″N 82°44′15″W
- Built: 1925-28
- NRHP reference No.: 75000563
- Added to NRHP: April 3, 1975

The Don CeSar is a hotel located in St. Pete Beach, Florida. Developed by Thomas Rowe and opened in 1928, it gained renown as the Gulf playground for America's pampered rich at the height of the Jazz Age. The hotel was designed by Henry H. Dupont. The Don CeSar is a member of Historic Hotels of America, the official program of the National Trust for Historic Preservation.

== Construction ==
In 1924, Thomas Rowe purchased 80 acres (320,000 m^{2}) of land in St. Petersburg and Pass-a-Grille for $100,000 to begin his dream of building a "pink castle". He hired architect Henry Dupont to design the hotel and Carlton Beard as contractor. To ensure the stability of the hotel on the shifting sand and avoid the high cost of sinking so many pilings, Beard devised a floating concrete pad and pyramid footings. To this day, there is no sign of evident settling of the hotel. The architecture is a blend of Mediterranean and Moorish styles modeled after different hotels and developments that Rowe and Beard saw in Palm Beach, Coral Gables and Boca Raton. Arched openings, red clay tile roofs, balconies, stucco over hollow tile and tower like upper stories were some of the elements that they borrowed. The original design called for a $450,000 six-story hotel with 110 rooms and baths. It was expanded to 220 rooms and 220 baths, and the costs soared to $1.25 million, 300% over budget. Rowe named it Don Ce-Sar after Don César de Bazan, the hero of William Vincent Wallace's opera Maritana.

Thomas Rowe’s main motivation for the design of Don Cesar came from his love for an opera singer named Lucinda. They could not be together because of the singers’ parents’ disapproval so Thomas put his time into the creation of the ‘Pink Place’ as tribute to her.

However, Don Cesar over the years has received several renovations, for example in 2011 there was a seven-million-dollar renovation replacing the Don Cesar’s tropical design with a more modern look meant to appeal to younger tourists and visitors. These changes were conducted by removing a fountain located on the fifth floor which was a replica of the same fountain that Thomas Rowe and Lucinda met while he was in London; the renovation also included other upgrades across the property.

== Opening ==
Rowe's "Pink Lady" opened on January 16, 1928, with an extravagant party attended by the elite of Tampa and St. Petersburg. The hotel quickly became a favorite romping ground for the rich and famous of the Jazz Age including F. Scott Fitzgerald, Clarence Darrow, Al Capone, Lou Gehrig, and Franklin D. Roosevelt. The Pink Palace continued to attract the rich and famous throughout the Great Depression in part to a deal made with New York Yankees owner Jacob Ruppert to house his team during spring training for three years.

However, after the sudden death of Rowe without a will, The Don was left to his estranged wife and began to fall into disrepair until the United States entered into World War II, and the hotel was bought by the Army for $450,000. It was converted into a military hospital and reopened in December 1942. In February 1944, the Don Ce-Sar became a convalescent center for the United States Army Air Corps. In June 1945, the Don Ce-Sar was ordered closed and was vacant by September 1945. It was converted into a Veterans Administration Regional Office by the end of 1945.

== World War II History ==
During World War II the Don CeSar hotel was temporally bought and taken by the United States Government through eminent domain. At this time the hotel went through extensive renovations in order to become a military hospital- all which included turning elegant rooms into operation rooms and guest rooms into medical facilities. Don Cesar turned into a convalescent center that served a maximum of 650 patients and men only who suffered exhaustion form the war were serviced; soldiers rested for about six to eight weeks before going back to the war.

While soldiers were recovering, they participated in various activities that they were required to take such as photography and journalism, they even participated in sports like fishing and riding with clubs from the city of St. Pete supported.

After the war ended the US Government still had control over Don Cesar and instead of its prior use as a hospital, it was used as Veterans Administration (VA) office. Once again, the Don Cesar was remodeled to adapt to administration necessities holding over 1,400 employees; the government continued to use the space until 1967 where the VA moved to another location in downtown St. Petersburg.

== Rebirth ==
In November 1967, the Veterans Administration began moving out of the Don Ce-Sar, having opened a new office in downtown St. Petersburg. By Spring 1969, the once grand hotel was vacant. The General Services Administration planned to raze the graffiti-covered hotel, but this plan was met with fierce opposition from local residents. In March 1972, the Don Ce-Sar was sold to C.L. Pyatt and William Bowman Jr., a franchise owner of Holiday Inn. The Don CeSar (now spelled without the hyphen) reopened on November 23, 1973. Multiple renovations from 1985 to 2001 have updated and added to the hotel, including a 4,000-square-foot (370 m^{2}) spa, a signature restaurant, and a second outdoor swimming pool. After the addition of the full-service beach club and spa, the official name of the hotel was changed to The Don CeSar Beach Resort and Spa.

The Don CeSar was named to the National Register of Historic Places in 1975 and became a founding member of the National Trust Historic Hotels of America in 1989.

In March 2025, The Don CeSar reopened after months of closure due to the previous years' devastating hurricanes: Helene and Milton. In January 2025, the resort celebrated its 97th anniversary, which was followed by the reopening. Additionally, the reopening featured the return of popular features and activities such as the beach front access, The Don CeSar Spa, and fitness center which began on April 1, 2025.

== Local Contributions ==
During the Covid-19 pandemic the Don CeSar as well as its sister property, The Beach House Suites, adjusted their services and operations to meet the requirements of their customers, staff members, and local laws. In addition, the Don CeSar donated to multiple organizations such as SPCA a non-profit organization and My Place in Recovery which is local shelter; the donations included sheets, blankets, beddings and towels.

== In popular culture ==
- The Don CeSar was featured in a full-color two-page spread in a 1982 issue of National Geographic.
- Don CeSar Hotel in St. Pete Beach, Fla, is said to be haunted by the unchained ghost of its original owner, Thomas Rowe {see " Don CeSar Hotel in St. Petersburg Beach" under 'Florida' in the Wikipedia article "Haunted Locations"}
- Parts of Once Upon a Time in America were filmed at the Don CeSar.
- Comedian Ron White talked about his stay at the Don CeSar in the movie Blue Collar Comedy Tour: One for the Road.
- Tom Petty and The Heartbreakers filmed a music video at the Don CeSar in 1985.
- Robert Altman's film Health was filmed in the hotel.
- The Don CeSar has a long list of famous guests and has hosted Franklin D. Roosevelt and every president since Gerald Ford (excluding Ronald Reagan).
- Thunder in Paradise was filmed around the Don CeSar during April 1993.
- The 1999 film Forever Mine was filmed at the Don CeSar.
- The Don CeSar was one of the featured hotels in the episode "Big Night Out" of Emeril's Florida, a 2013 series starring Emeril Lagasse.
- The 2016 Brad Furman movie The Infiltrator was filmed in part on the rooftop balcony of the Don CeSar in Spring 2015.
- The Pitbull song "Sexy Beaches" was used in the "Visit Florida" tourism campaign, sponsored by the state of Florida. The music video was filmed at The Don CeSar in St. Petersburg, Florida, and was uploaded to Pitbull's YouTube on July 13, 2016.
- The TV series Life's Rewards was filmed in St. Petersburg and Clearwater, Florida, and its setting is the Don CeSar.

== See also ==
- List of Historic Hotels of America
