= List of historical societies in Indiana =

The following is a list of historical societies in the state of Indiana, United States.

== Organizations ==
History of Indiana
- The seal of Indiana reflects the state's pioneer era

Historical Periods
- Pre-history: until 1670
- French Rule: 1679–1763
- British Rule: 1763–1783
- U.S. Territorial Period: 1783–1816
- Indiana Statehood: 1816–present

Major Events
- Tecumseh's War War of 1812: 1811–1814
- Constitutional convention: June 1816
- Polly v. Lasselle: 1820
- Capitol moved to Indianapolis: 1825
- Passage of the Mammoth Internal Improvement Act: 1831
- State Bankruptcy: 1841
- 2nd Constitution: 1851
- Civil War: 1860–1865
- Gas Boom: 1887–1905
- Harrison elected president: 1888
- KKK scandal: 1925

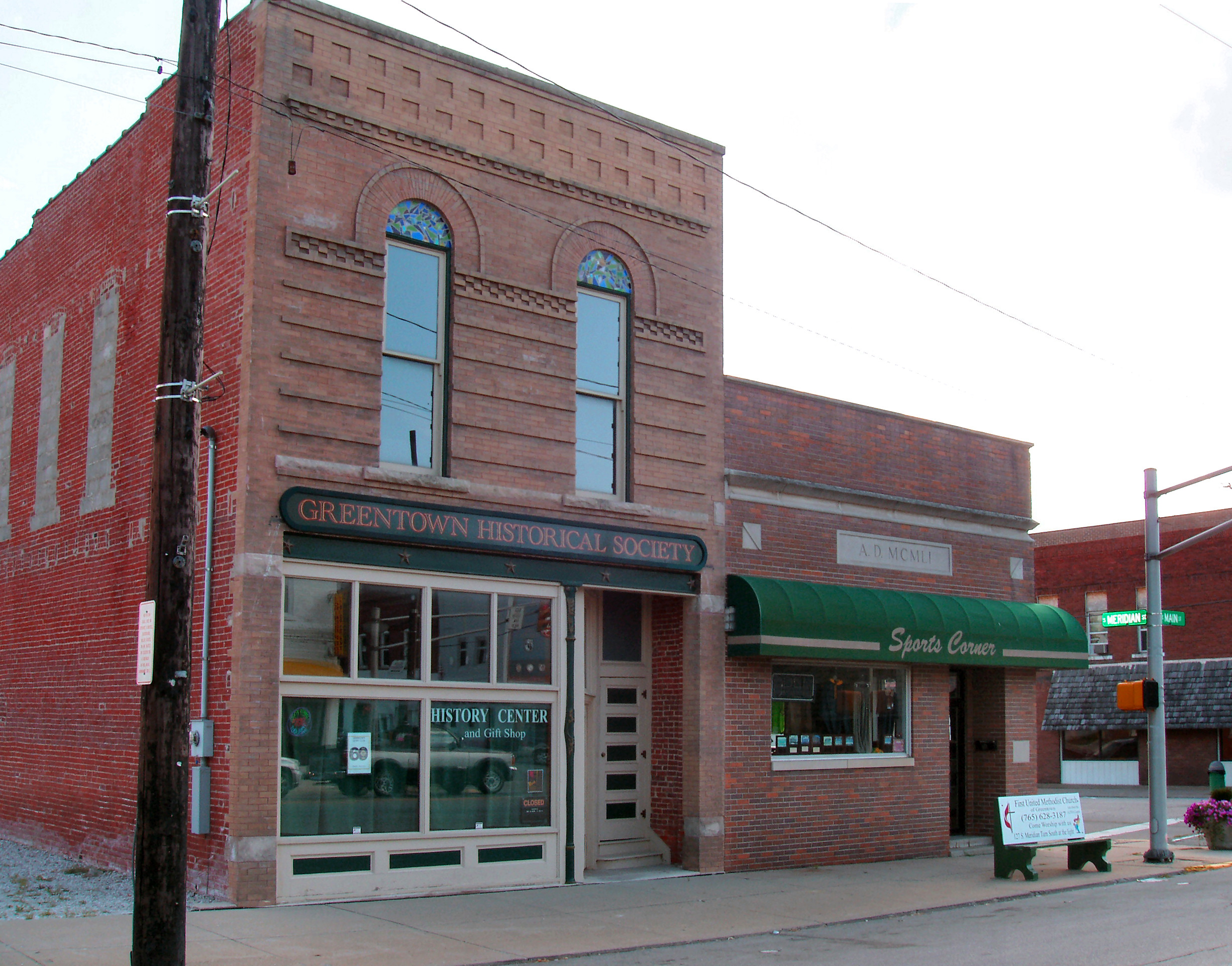
Greentown Historical Society building in Indiana (photo 2005)

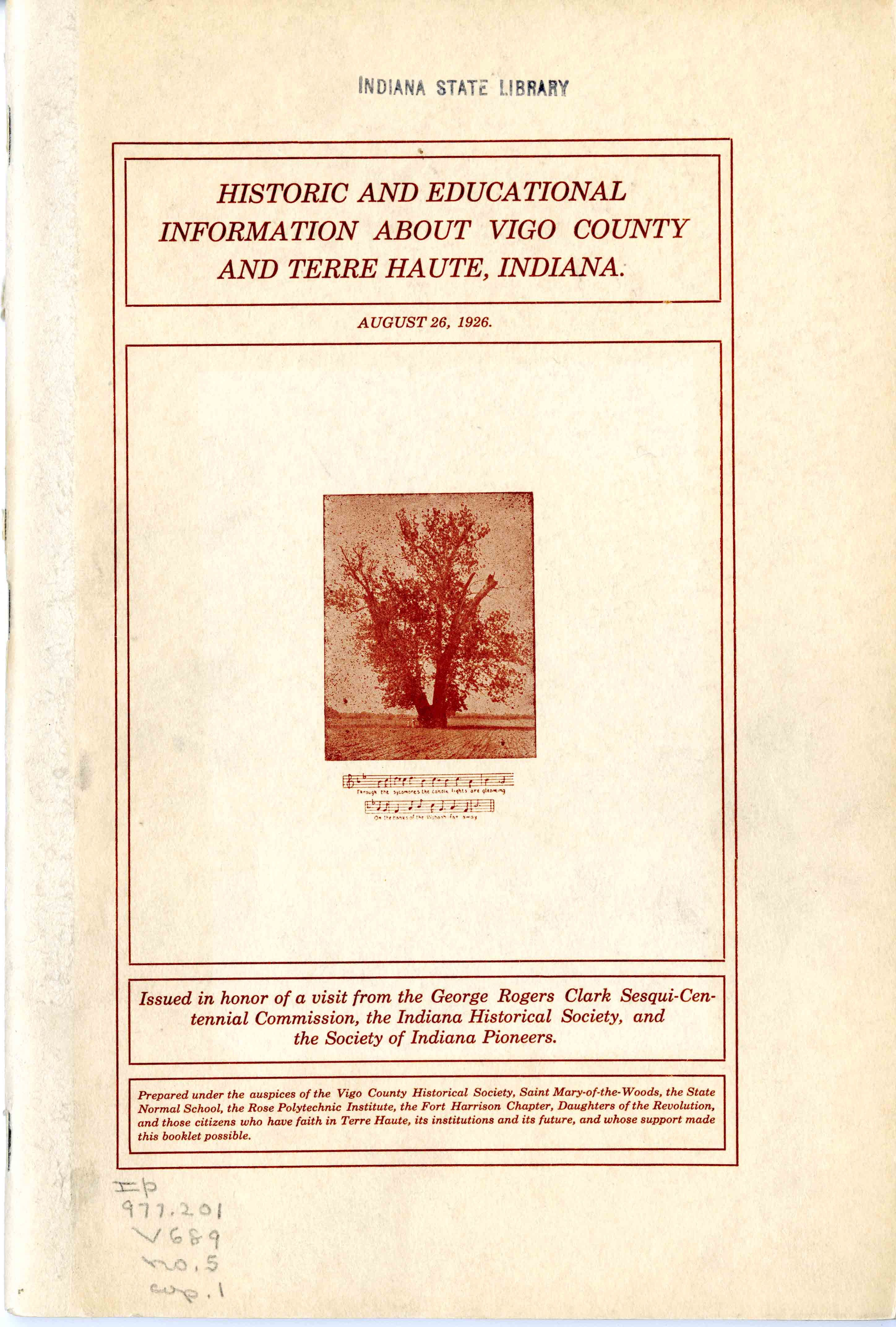
1926 publication of the Vigo County Historical Society, Indiana

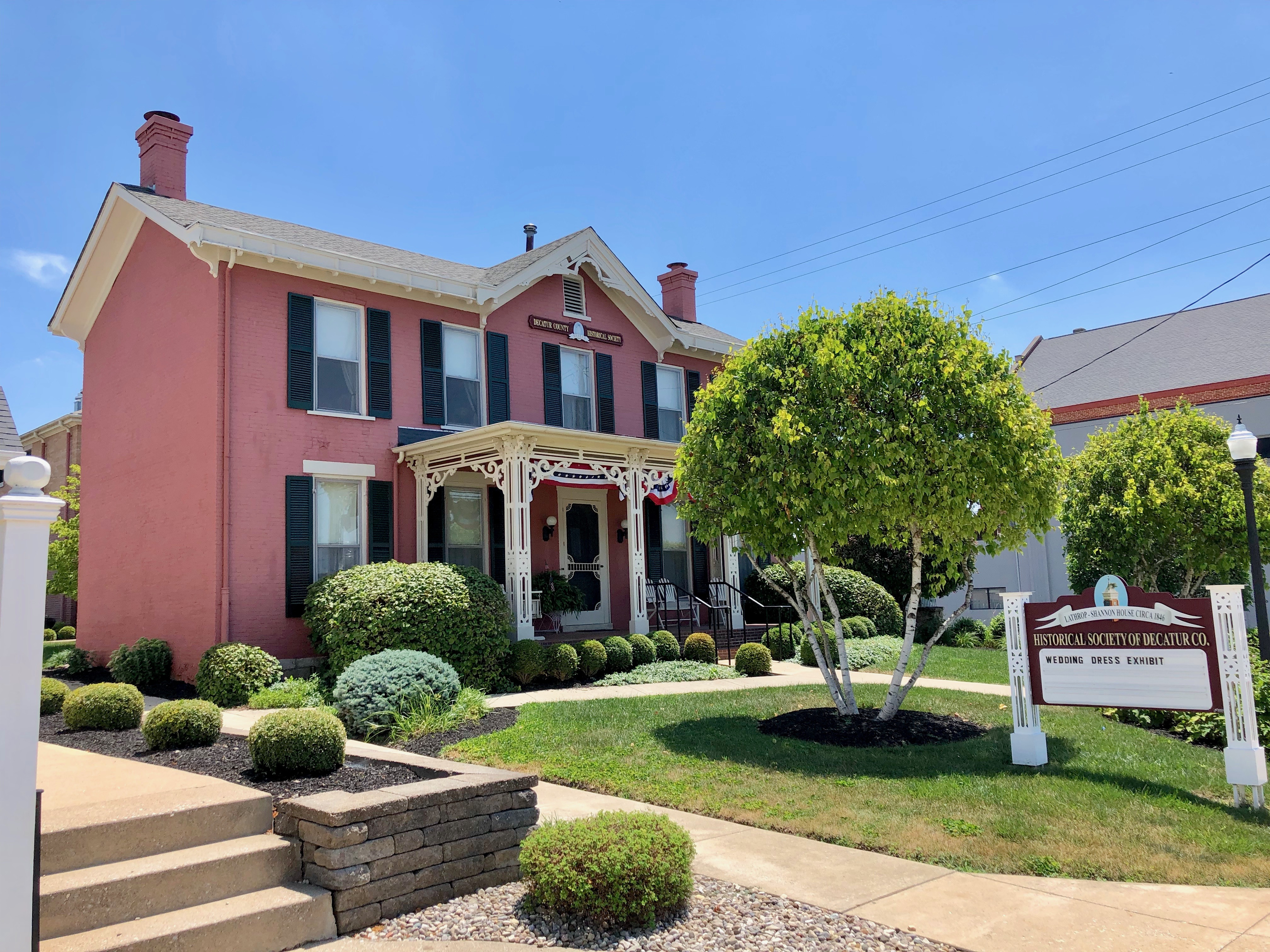
Decatur County Historical Society building and sign in Indiana (photo 2019)

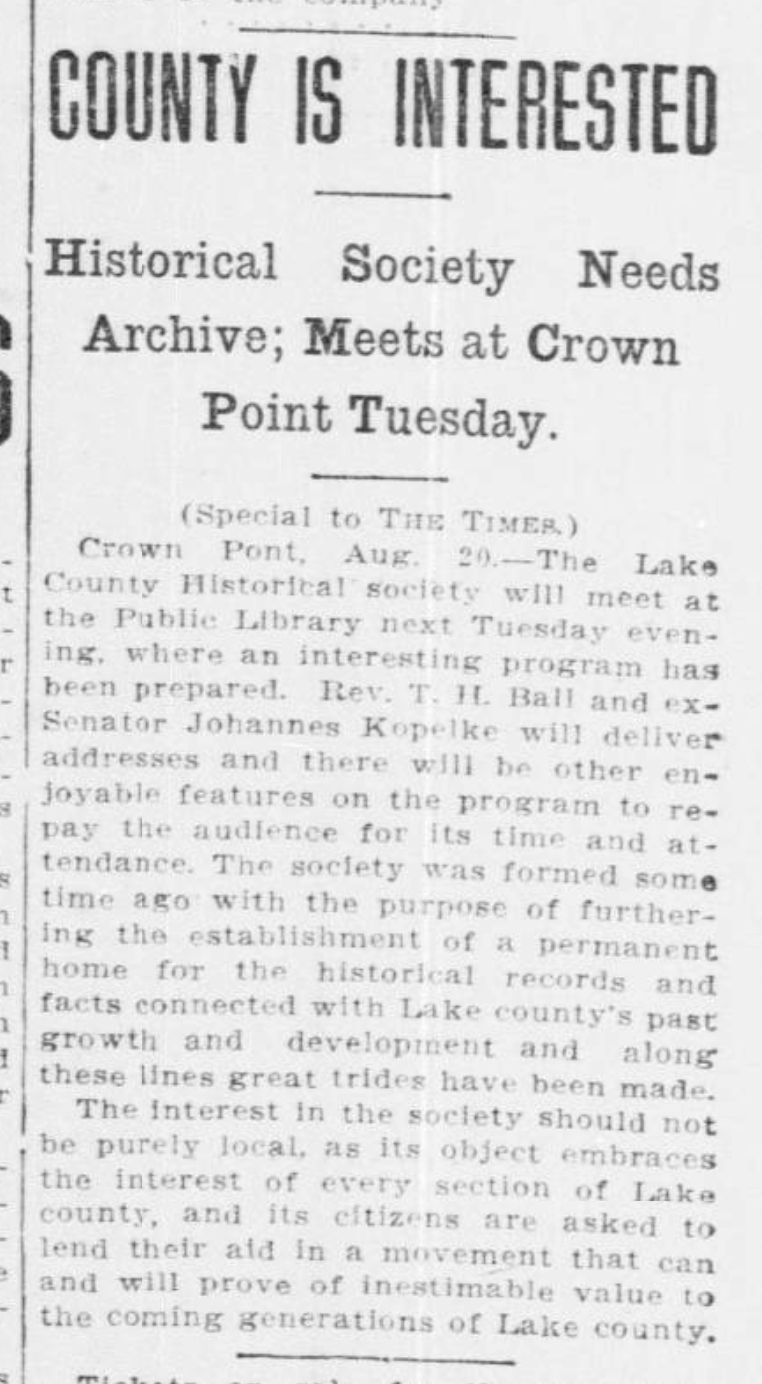
1909 newspaper article related to the Lake County Historical Society, Indiana

- Abington Historical Society
- Adams County Historical Society
- Alexandria-Monroe Township Historical Society
- Allen County-Fort Wayne Historical Society
- Anson Wolcott Historical Society
- Antiquarian and Historical Society of Culver
- Balbec Historical Club
- Bartholomew County Historical Society
- Batesville Area Historical Society
- Beech Grove Historical Society
- Benton County Historical Society
- Besancon Historical Society
- Beverly Shores Historical Society
- Blackford County Historical Society
- Boone County Historical Society
- Borden Institute Historical Society
- Brown County Historical Society
- Canal Society of Indiana
- Carmel Clay Historical Society
- Carroll County Historical Society
- Cass County Historical Society
- Christian Park Active Community
- Clark's Grant Historical Society
- Clarksville Historical Society
- Clay County Historical Society
- Clay Township Historical & Preservation Society
- Clinton County Historical Society
- Crawford County Historical and Genealogical Society
- Daviess County Historical Society
- Dearborn County Historical Society
- Decatur Township Historical Society
- DeKalb County Historical Society
- Delaware County Historical Society
- Demotte Historical Society
- Dubois County Historical Society
- Duneland Historical Society
- Dyer Historical Society
- East Chicago Historical Society
- Elkhart County Historical Society
- Elwood-Pipecreek Historical Society
- Ferdinand Historical Society
- Floyd County Historical Society
- Fort Wayne Railroad Historical Society
- Fountain County Historical Society
- Franklin County Historical Society
- Franklin Township Historical Society
- Fremont Historical Society
- Fulton County Historical Society
- Garrett Historical Society
- Gary Historical & Cultural Society
- Gas City Historical Society
- Gibson County Historical Society
- Grabill Historical Society
- Grant County Historical Society
- Greene County Historical Society
- Greentown Historical Society
- Griffith Historical Society
- Haley Tower Historical & Technical Society
- Hamilton County Historical Society
- Hammond Historical Society
- Hancock County Historical Society
- Hanna Historical Society
- Haubstadt Area Historical Society
- Hebron Historical Society
- Henry County Historical Society
- Hessville Historical Society
- Highland Historical Society
- Historical Society of Decatur County
- Historical Society of Harrison County
- Historical Society of Ogden Dunes
- Historical Society of Porter County
- Hobart Historical Society
- Howard County Historical Society
- Huntertown Historical Society
- Huntington County Historical Society
- Indiana German Heritage Society
- Indiana High School Basketball Historical Society
- Indiana Historical Radio Society
- Indiana Historical Society
- Indiana Jewish Historical Society
- Indiana Postal History Society
- Indianapolis Firefighters Historical Society
- Ireland Historical Society
- Irvington Historical Society
- Jackson Township Historical Society
- Jasper County Historical Society
- Jay County Historical Society
- Jefferson County Historical Society
- Jennings County Historical Society
- Johnson County Historical Society
- Jonesboro Historical Society
- Joseph Boggs Society for Historic Preservation
- Kankakee Valley Historical Society
- Kendallville Historical Society
- Kennard Historical Society
- Kosciusko County Historical Society
- La Porte County Historical Society
- LaGrange County Historical Society
- Lake County Historical Society
- Lake Station Historical Society
- Lawrence County Railroad Historical Society
- Lexington Historical Society
- Liberty Township Historical Society
- Ligonier Historical Society
- Linden-Madison Township Historical Society
- Long Beach Historical Society
- Madison County Historical Society
- Marion County Historical Society
- Marshall County Historical Society
- Martin County Historical Society
- Matthews Covered Bridge Historical Society
- Merrillville-Ross Township Historical Society
- Miami County Historical Society
- Michiana Jewish Historical Society
- Michigan City Historical Society
- Middletown Fall Creek Township Historical Society
- Mississinewa Battlefield Society
- Monon Railroad Historical–Technical Society, Inc.
- Monroeville Historical Society
- Montgomery County Historical Society
- Montpelier Historical Society
- Morgan County History and Genealogy Association
- Munster Historical Society
- New Paris Historical Society
- Newton County Historical Society
- Noble County Historical Society
- North Manchester Center for History
- Northern Indiana Historical Society
- Ohio County Historical Society
- Orange County Historical Society
- Orestes Historical Society
- Osceola Historical Society
- Owen County Historical and Genealogical Society
- Parke County Historical Society
- Pekin Historical Society
- Perry Township Pioneer Cemetery Society
- Perry Township-Southport Historical Society
- Pike Township Historical Society
- Portage Community Historical Society
- Posey County Historical Society
- Pulaski County Historical Society
- Putnam County Historical Society
- Randolph County Historical and Genealogical Society
- Remington Historical Society
- Ripley County Historical Society
- Russiaville Historical Society
- Schererville Historical Society
- Scotland Historical Society
- Scott County Historical Society
- Shelby Township Historical Association
- Sheridan Historical Society
- Shipshewana Area Historical Society
- Shirley Historical Society
- Society of Indiana Pioneers
- South Lake County Agricultural Historical Society
- Southwestern Indiana Historical Society
- Spencer County Historical Society
- St. John Historical Society
- Starke County Historical Society
- Steuben County Historical Society
- Sugar Creek Historical Society
- Sullivan County Historical Society
- Summitville Van Buren Township Historical Society
- Surveyors Historical Society
- Switzerland County Historical Society
- Tell City Historical Society
- The Wanatah Historical Society
- Three Creeks Historical Association
- Tippecanoe County Historical Association
- Tipton County Historical Society
- Topeka Area Historical Society
- Union County Historical Society
- Upland Area Historical Society
- Vanderburgh County Historical Society
- Vermillion County Historical Society
- Vigo County Historical Society
- Vincennes Historical and Antiquarian Society
- Wabash County Historical Society
- Wakarusa Historical Society
- Walkerton Area Historical Society
- Warren County Historical Society
- Washington County Historical Society
- Wayne Township Historical Society
- Wells County Historical Society
- West Baden Historical Society
- Westfield-Washington Historical Society
- Westville Community Historical Society
- White County Historical Society
- Whiting-Robertsdale Historical Society
- Whitley County Historical Society
- Yorktown Mt. Pleasant Township Historical Alliance
- Zionsville Historical Society

== See also ==
- History of Indiana
- List of museums in Indiana
- National Register of Historic Places listings in Indiana
- List of historical societies in the United States
