= Bona Thompson Memorial Center =

Historic building in Irvington, Indianapolis, Indiana, U.S.

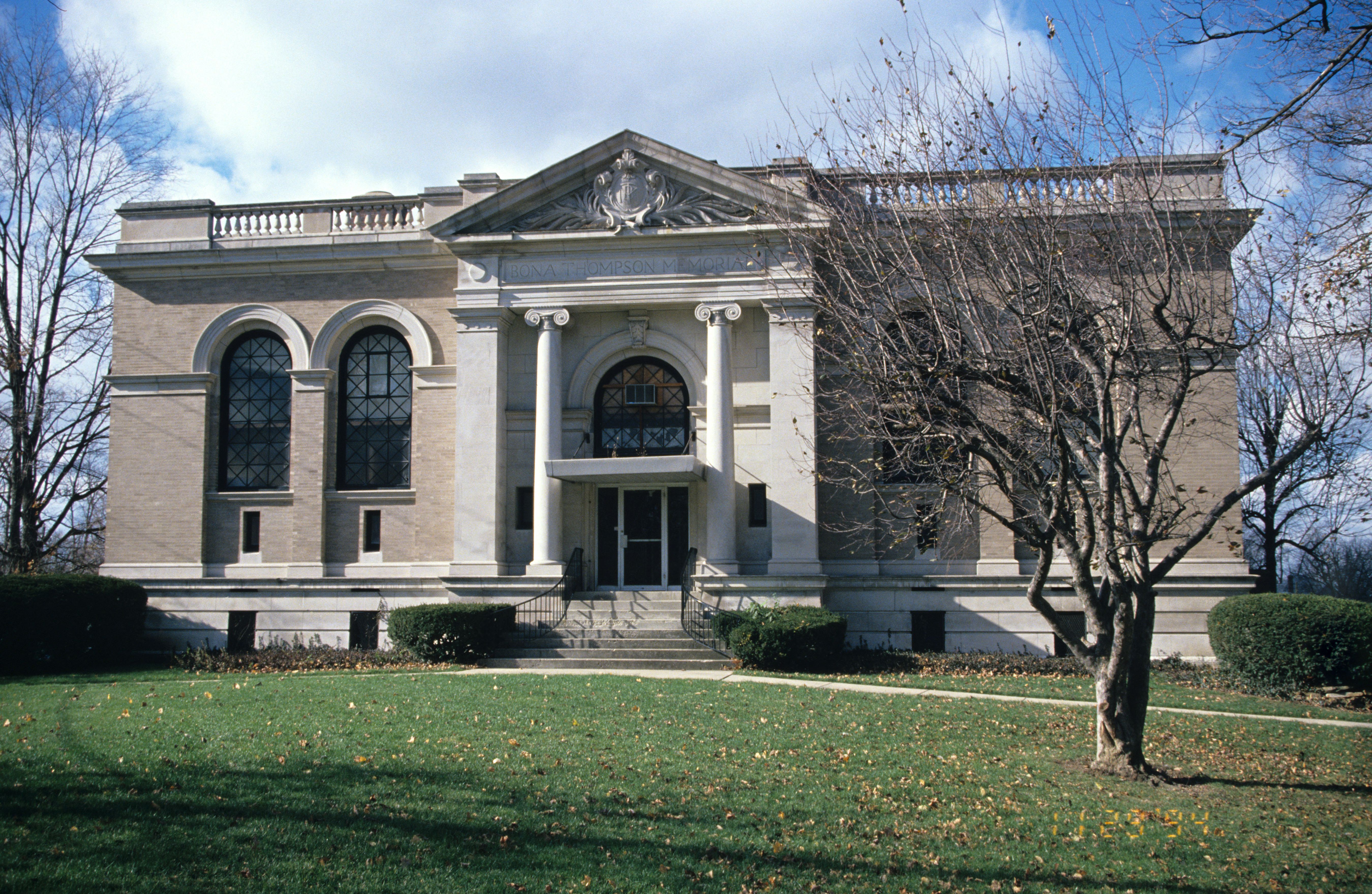
- Bona Thompson Memorial Center on the original campus of Butler University in the Irvington Historic District
- Former names: Bona Thompson Memorial Library

General information
- Status: Completed
- Location: 5350 E. University Ave., Indianapolis, Indiana, U.S.
- Coordinates: 39.7665°N 86.0768°W
- Current tenants: Irvington Historical Society
- Completed: 1903

Design and construction
- Architects: Henry H. Dupont and Jesse T. Johnson

Website
- Irvington Historical Society

The Bona Thompson Memorial Center, formerly the Bona Thompson Memorial Library, is a historic building on the original Butler University campus in the Irvington Historic District of Indianapolis, Indiana, United States. The building was designed by Henry H. Dupont and Jesse T. Johnson. It was constructed in 1903, during the period from 1875 to 1928 when Irvington was the home of Butler University. The building is now known as Bona Thompson Memorial Center.

Except for the library and former university president's home (now Irvington United Methodist Church, locally called the "Church on the Circle"), all the other Butler University buildings in Irvington have been demolished.

== Irvington Historical Society ==
The Bona Thompson Memorial Center houses the Irvington Historical Society and its collections of art and historical documents. The Society's art collection can be viewed in a renovated gallery space. Also on display are various art shows, including a yearly juried show. Events from meetings to weddings and receptions are held at the center.

The museum is open Saturdays and Sundays, 1 - 4 p.m. (closed holidays).

Special exhibits are found in the Kingsbury and Pavey Galleries. Permanent displays include International Harvester, West Baden Angels, and Irvington Train Depot and Telegraph Office.

== See also ==
- List of historical societies in Indiana
