= Hall School (Hall, Indiana) =

- U.S. National Register of Historic Places
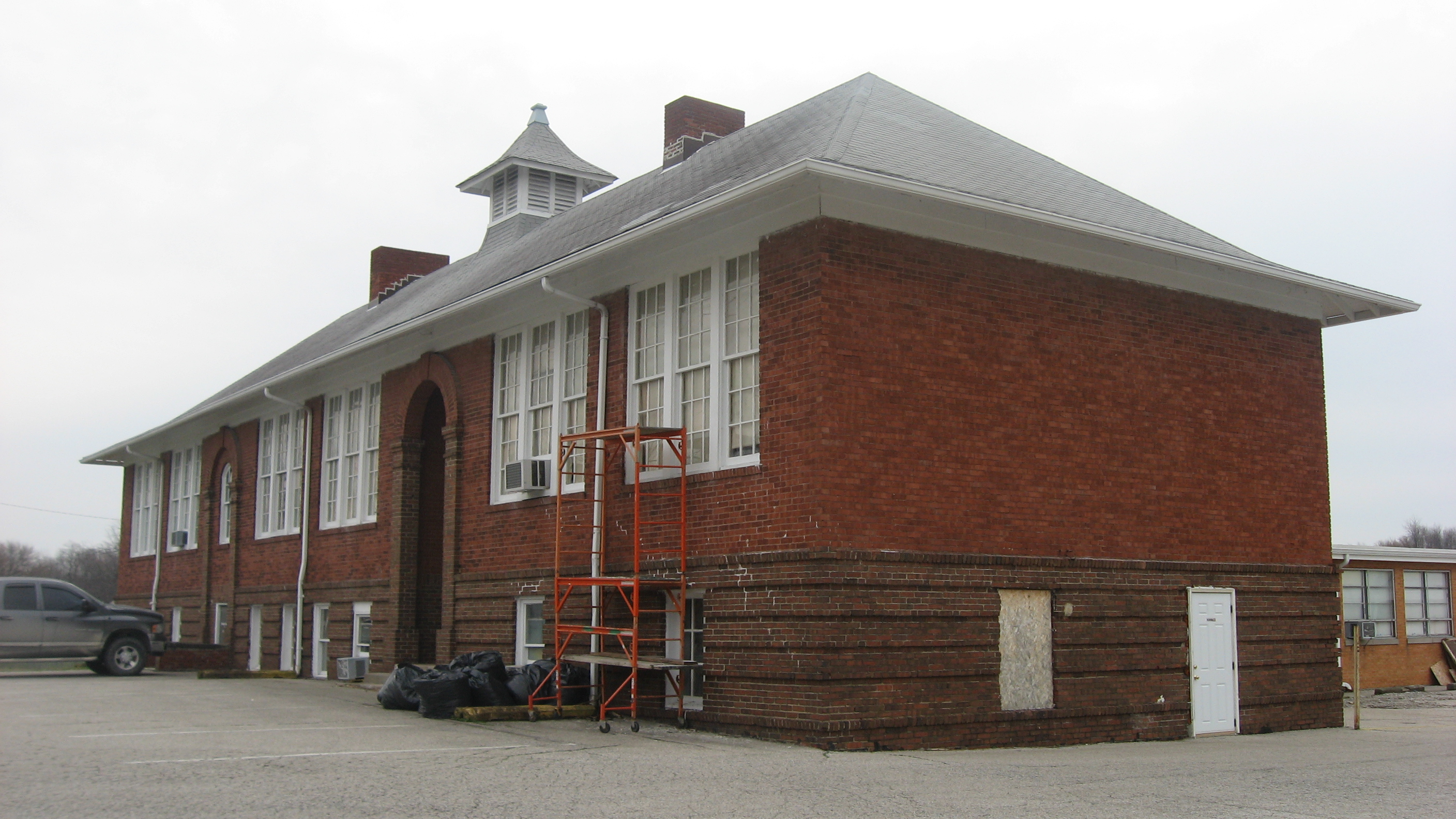

- Location within Indiana Location within the United States
- Location: 5955 W. Hurt Rd., Monrovia, Indiana
- Coordinates: 39°32′59″N 86°32′24″W
- Area: 0 acres (0 ha)
- Built: 1911
- Architect: Dupont, Henry H.
- Architectural style: Bungalow/craftsman
- NRHP reference No.: 04001100
- Added to NRHP: September 29, 2004

Hall School in Hall, Indiana, was designed by Henry H. Dupont and built in 1911. It is located at 5955 West Hurt Road at Hall in Gregg Township. It is an example of the Craftsman architecture in the vernacular style. The building has 2-floors with six classrooms and additions built in 1957 and 1971. The Morgan County Historic Preservation Society, an affiliate of Indiana Landmarks, nominated the school to the National Register of Historic Places in 2004, a year before the building went vacant due to school consolidation.

It was listed on the National Register of Historic Places in 2004.
