= Exit control lock =

Device to prevent unauthorized exit

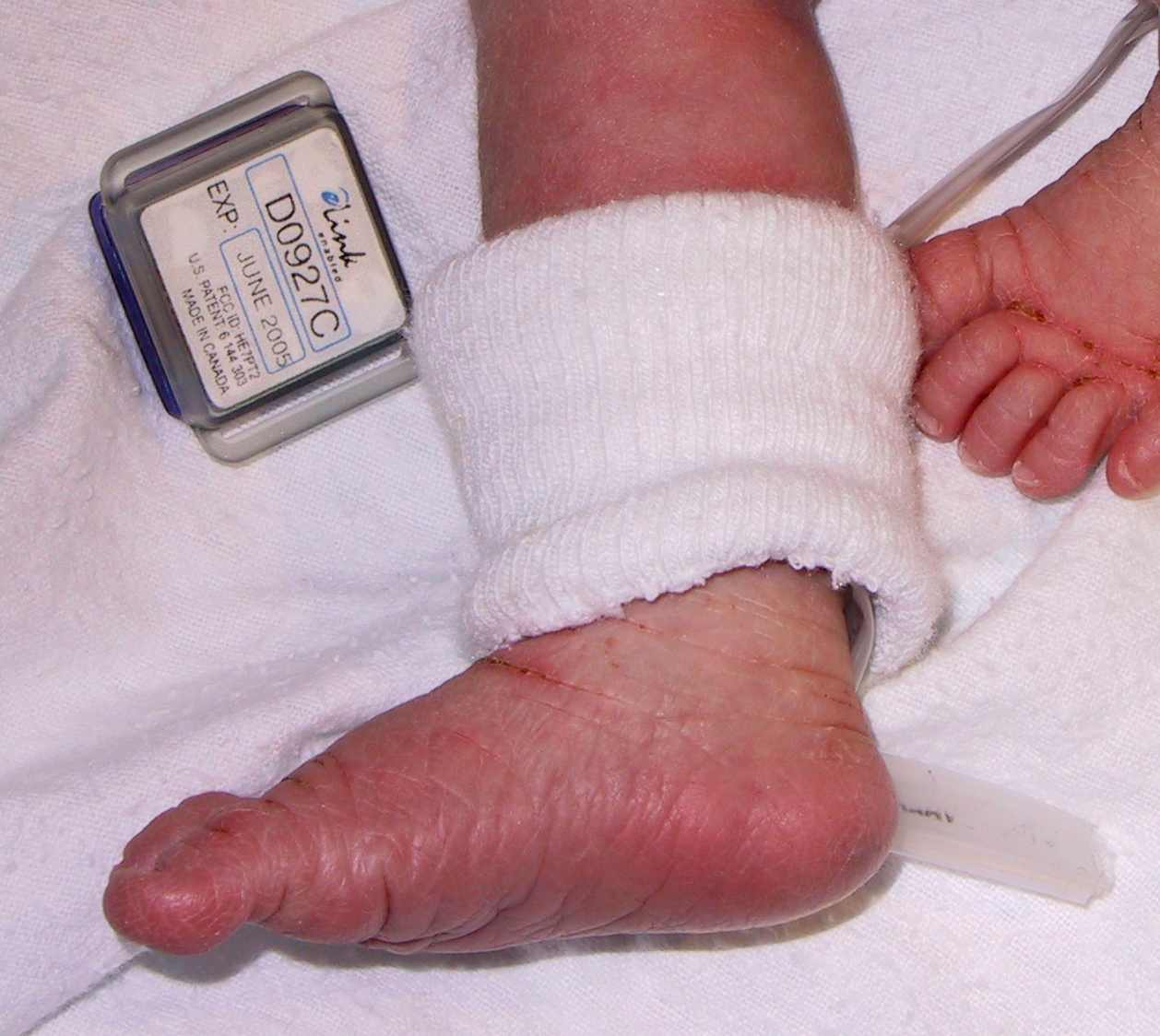
Exit control lock transmitter used to prevent unauthorized removal of a newborn baby

An exit control lock (also known as an exit control device, exit lock, or simply an exit control) prevents or deters unauthorized exit.

== Function ==
Many exit control locks incorporate magnetic locks. One type, called "delayed egress magnetic locks", will not allow the door to open immediately. This delay reserves time for security personnel to get to the door before the door opens. The lock will also release if there is a fire alarm or power failure, but otherwise these locks hold the exit doors shut.

Exit control systems can include a "request to exit detector" such as a pushbutton that opens the exit, if exit requests are enabled.

In some facilities, entrances as well as exits require authentication such as swiping or otherwise reading a card with a card reader. If an intruder slips by the entrance controls of a building, they will not be able to exit undetected (unless they also slip by the exit controls), and can be detained for questioning.

== Typical uses ==
Exit control locks are often used in retail establishments to deter shoplifting. They are also used in airports and other controlled areas, where people are held until they clear customs or quarantine stations. Exit control locks are also used in libraries, where there is one well-staffed entrance and exit, and a number of other exits that are intended for emergency use only.

=== Hospitals and nursing homes ===
Exit control devices are often used in hospitals, and can be interfaced to wireless sensors worn by newborn children, so that all exits will lock if a baby is stolen from one of the hospital rooms. For example, if a newborn baby is removed from a specialized section of the hospital without proper exit procedures, all exit control locks in the area switch to the locked state. Attempts to remove the transmitter from the baby's ankle also lock the exits. If the transmitter falls out, an alarm also sounds. The exits remain locked while the alarm is sounding, and unlock only after the alarm is cleared.

Similar devices are often used in Alzheimer's disease housing facilities.

=== Retail shops and storerooms ===
Often, retail stores will install emergency exits in a way that discourages their misuse for shoplifting. Usually, the door is locked with an emergency exit button next to it. Pushing the emergency exit button will unlock the door, and also trigger the fire alarm. This deters shoplifting because a person who unlocks the door in order to take an item out of the building when it is not an emergency may be reported to the police, with CCTV footage if available.

==== Benefits of locking door ====
- Shoplifters will be deterred because using the exit would attract unwanted attention.
- Reduces requirements for security guards and security technology (e.g. CCTV, electronic article surveillance gates).

==== Benefits of not locking door ====
- Increased footfall: Multiple exits will lead to people walking through the shop, and therefore having the shop's products advertised to them, as a shortcut.
- Psychological evidence shows that customers feel less relaxed and welcomed if there are signs saying that they are not allowed to do something if there is not an emergency. They can also feel frustrated at having to look for another exit.
