= Hall, Indiana =

- Unincorporated community
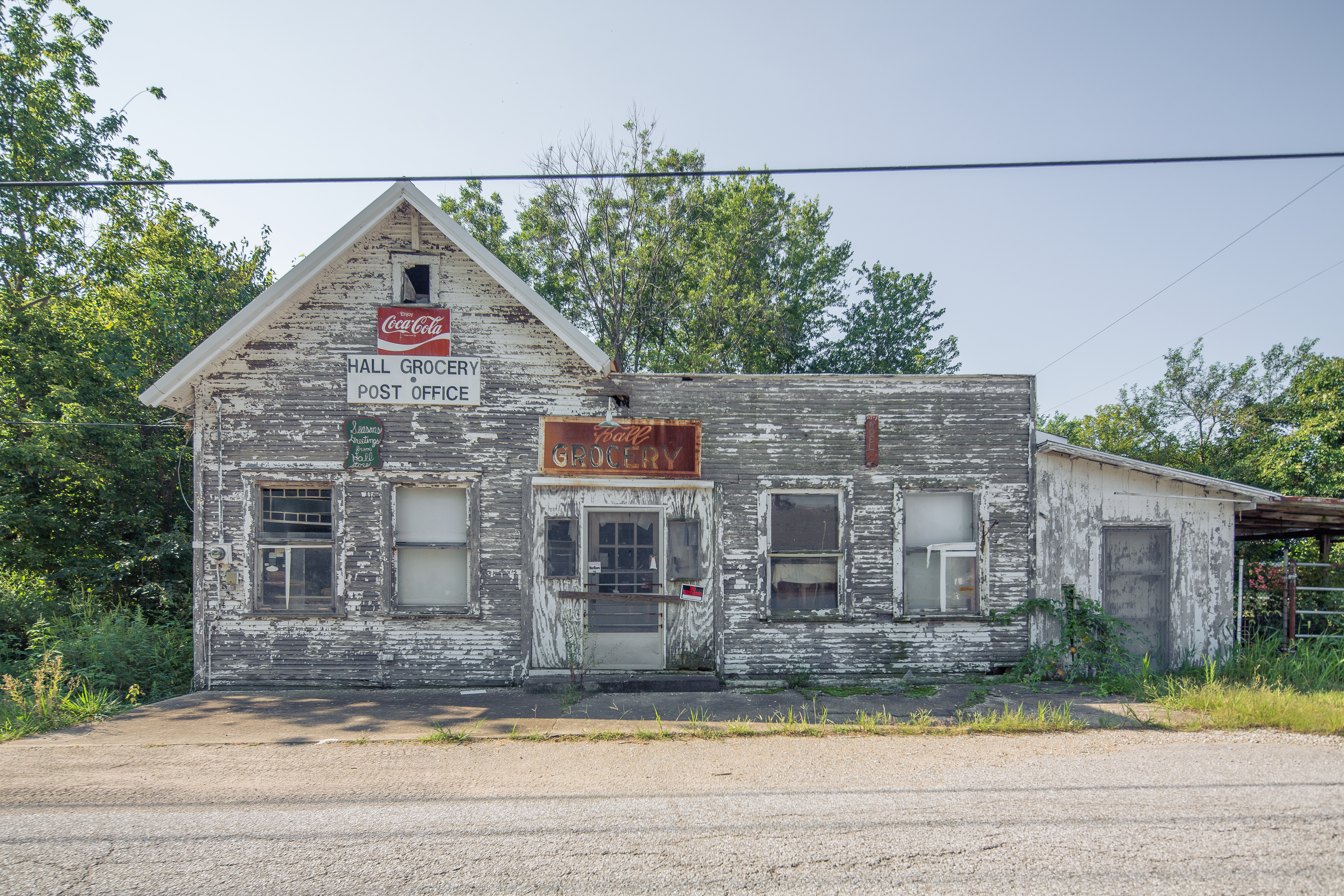

- Location within Indiana Location within the United States
- Coordinates: 39°33′00″N 86°32′09″W
- Country: United States
- State: Indiana
- County: Morgan
- Township: Gregg
- Elevation: 801 ft (244 m)
- Time zone: UTC-5 (Eastern (EST))
  - Summer (DST): UTC-4 (EDT)
- ZIP code: 46157
- FIPS code: 18-30474
- GNIS feature ID: 435609

Hall is an unincorporated community in Gregg Township, Morgan County, in the U.S. state of Indiana.

== History ==
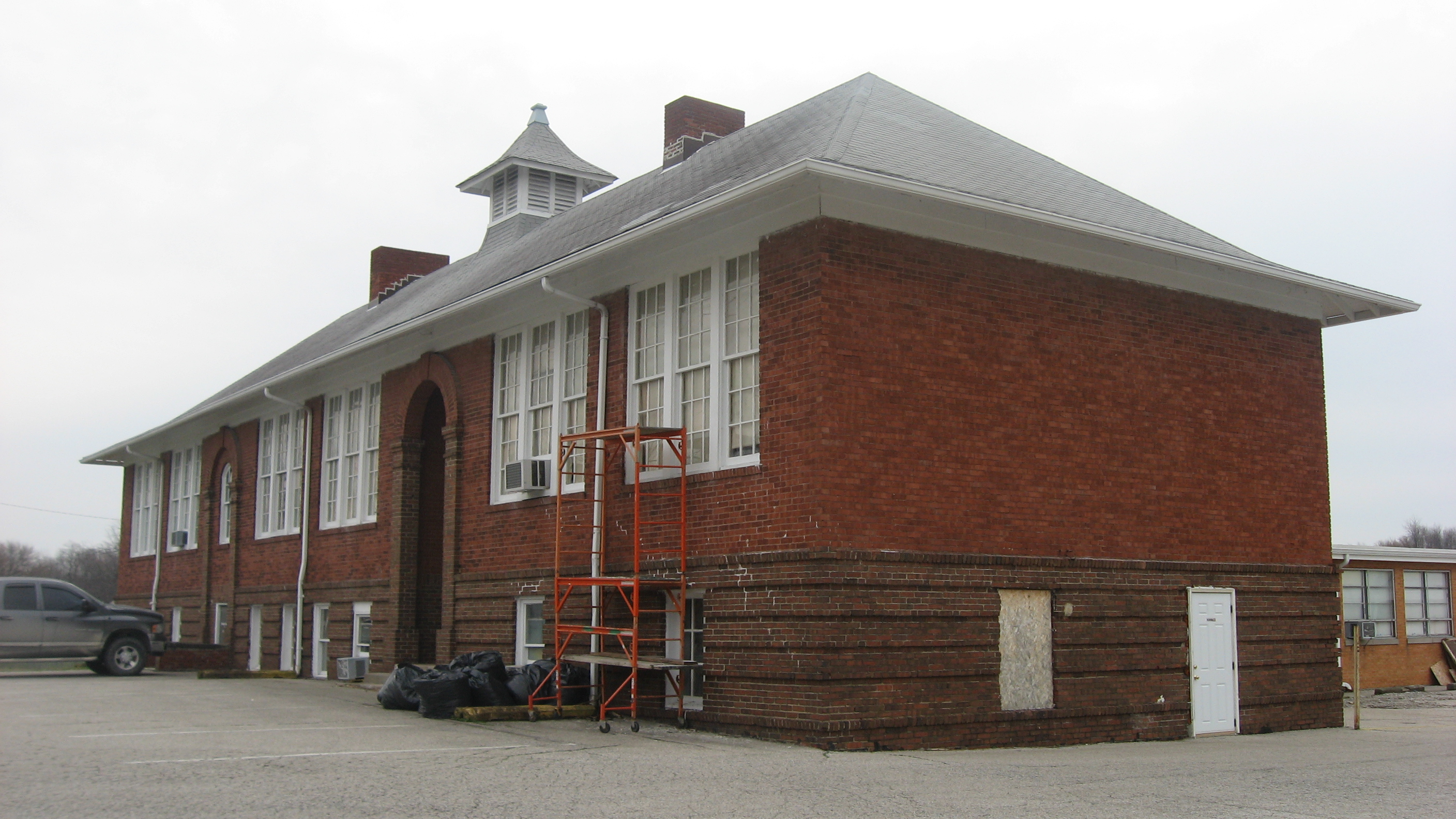
Hall's old school

Hall was laid out in 1861. A post office was established at Hall in 1854, and remained in operation until it was discontinued in 1966.

The Hall School is listed on the National Register of Historic Places.

== Notable person ==
Hall is the birthplace of former Indiana State & UCLA coach and Purdue player John Wooden.
