= Casa De Muchas Flores =

Historic house in Florida, United States

- U.S. National Register of Historic Places
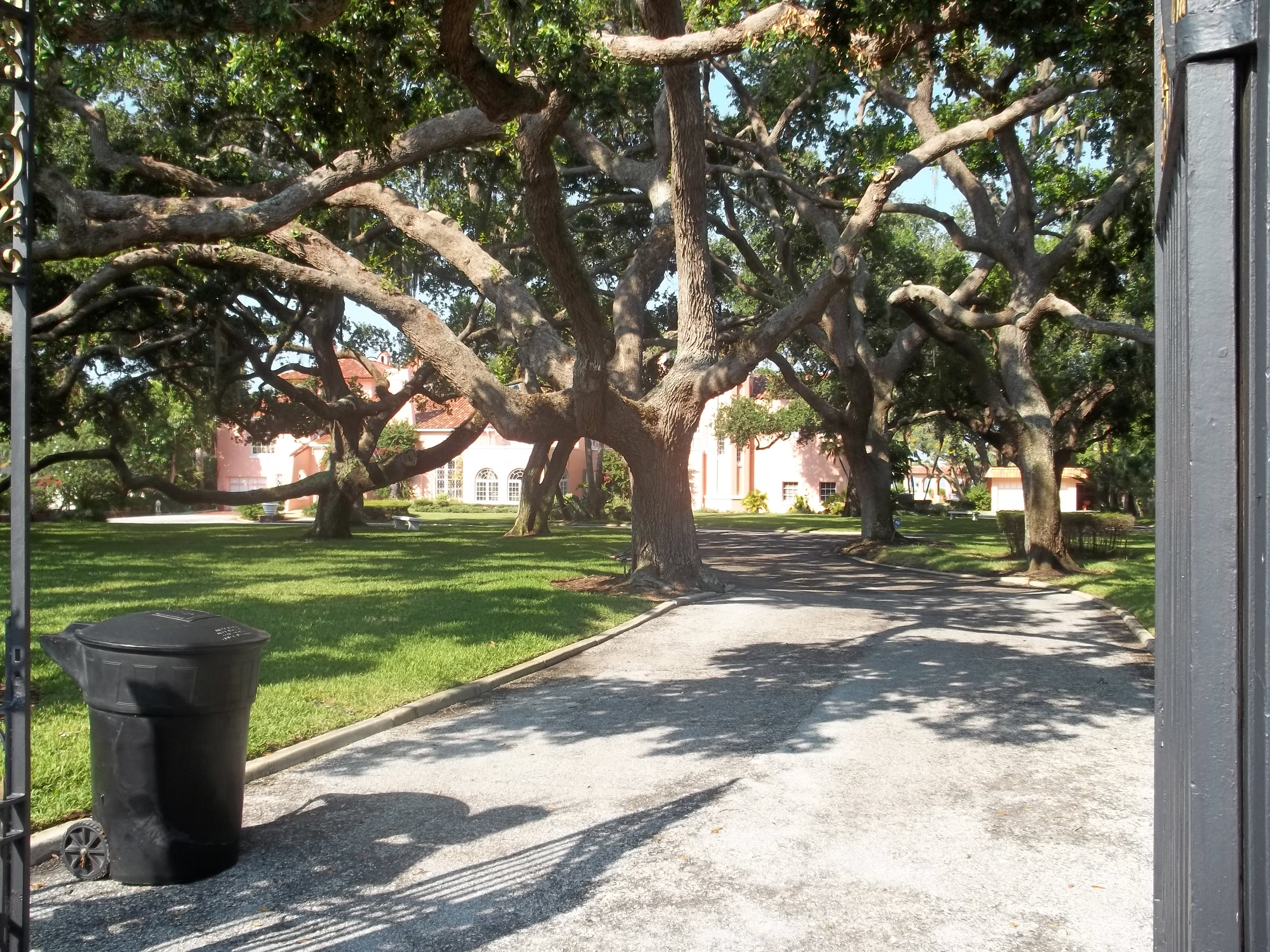

- Location within Florida Location within the United States
- Location: St. Petersburg, Florida
- Coordinates: 27°47′11″N 82°45′9″W
- NRHP reference No.: 85000160
- Added to NRHP: 31 January 1985

The Casa De Muchas Flores (also known as the Miller-Babet House) is a historic home in St. Petersburg, Florida. It is located at 1446 Park Street North. On January 31, 1985, it was added to the U.S. National Register of Historic Places.

As of 2025, it remains a private residence.
