= Veillard House =

Historic house in Florida, United States

- U.S. National Register of Historic Places
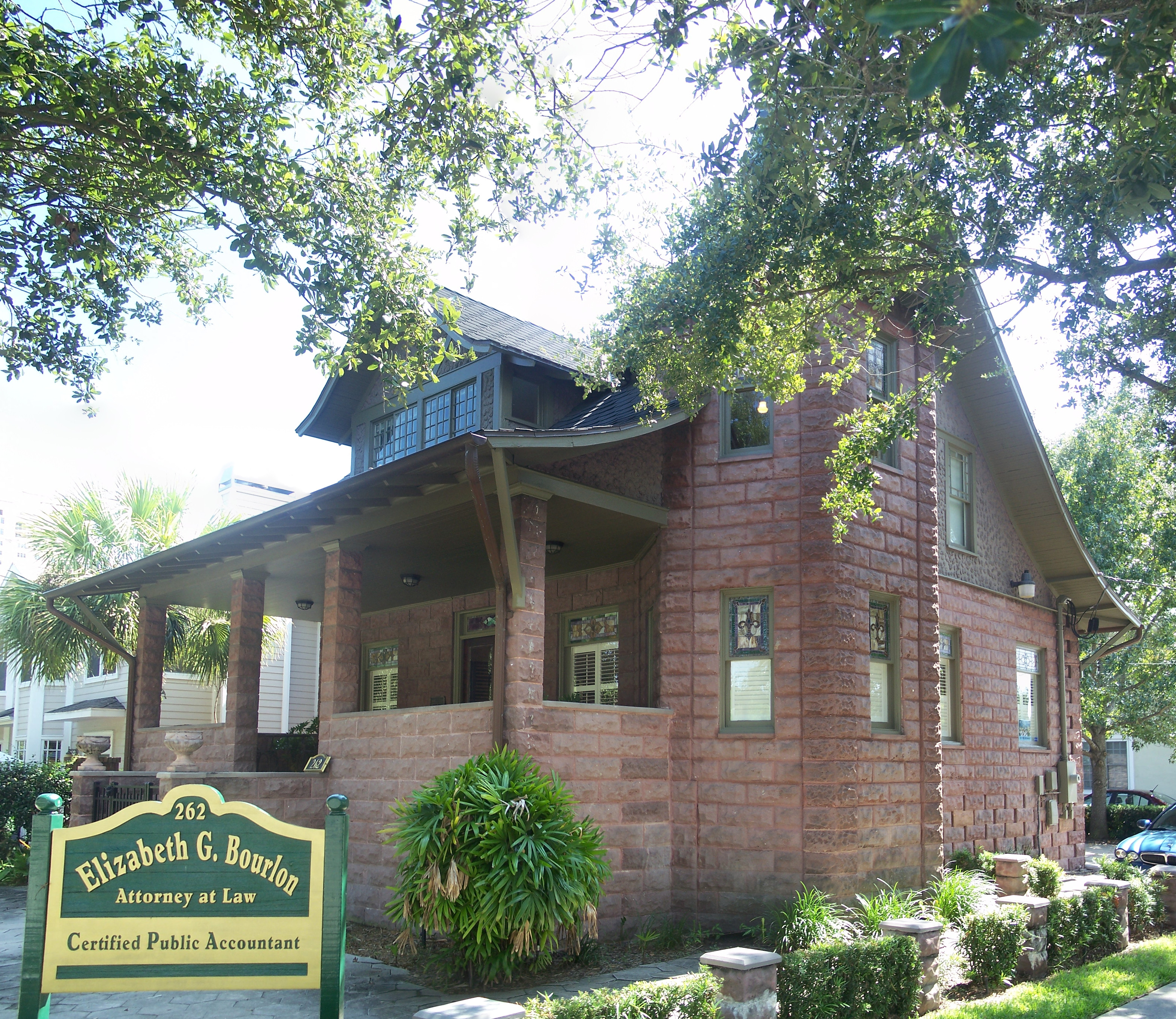

- Location within Florida Location within the United States
- Location: St. Petersburg, Florida
- Coordinates: 27°46′34″N 82°38′24″W
- Architectural style: Queen Anne/Bungalow/Craftsman
- NRHP reference No.: 82001038
- Added to NRHP: October 29, 1982

The Veillard House is a historic home in St. Petersburg, Florida. It is located at 262 North 4th Avenue. On October 29, 1982, it was added to the U.S. National Register of Historic Places.
