= List of Michigan state game and wildlife areas =

Location of Michigan within the United States

The following is a list of Michigan state game and wildlife areas found throughout the U.S. state of Michigan. The state has a system of publicly owned lands managed primarily for wildlife conservation, wildlife observation, recreational activities, and hunting. Some areas provide opportunities for camping, hiking, cross-country skiing, fishing, bird watching, bicycling, boating, and off-road vehicle trails. Activities, as well as rules and regulations, vary among individual areas.

The Michigan Department of Natural Resources oversees the properties through subdivisions including the Forestry Division, Parks and Recreation Division, Grouse Enhanced Management System (GEMS), and the Wildlife Division. Local municipalities may also enforce their own rules and regulations, and some portions may be private property. Some units are managed cooperatively on the national level with the National Park Service, U.S. Fish and Wildlife Service, or U.S. Forest Service. Depending on their purpose, the units are divided into four categories: state game areas, state wildlife management areas, state wildlife areas, and state wildlife research areas. GEMS and designated waterfowl production areas are categorized as state wildlife management areas.

There are a total of 212 distinct units, which account for a total approximate land area of 688,000 acres (278,000 ha) or 1,075 square miles (2,780 km^{2}). Some units encompass very large areas, with the largest being the Allegan State Game Area at 51,250 acres (20,740 ha) or 80 square miles (210 km^{2}). The smallest unit is the Mud Creek Flooding State Wildlife Management Area at only 18 acres (7.3 ha).

== List ==
Name	County	Coordinates	Area	Ref
Adams Township State Game Area	Hillsdale	41°56′44″N 84°30′10″W	181 acres (73 ha)	
Addis Creek Flooding State Wildlife Management Area	Kalkaska; Missaukee	44°30′15″N 84°54′32″W	110 acres (45 ha)	
Allegan State Game Area	Allegan	42°33′51″N 85°59′46″W	50,656 acres (20,500 ha)	
Almer Township State Game Area	Tuscola	43°31′39″N 83°25′59″W	160 acres (65 ha)	
Au Train Basin State Waterfowl (Wildlife) Management Area	Alger	46°18′02″N 86°51′56″W	5,768 acres (2,334 ha)	
Backus Creek State Game Area	Roscommon	44°20′44″N 84°35′35″W	4,379 acres (1,772 ha)	
Bakale Wildlife Unit of Bass River State Recreation Area	Ottawa	43°00′24″N 85°59′09″W	830 acres (340 ha)	
Baraga Plains State Waterfowl (Wildlife) Management Area	Baraga	46°37′28″N 88°34′51″W	13,354 acres (5,404 ha)	
Barker Creek State Wildlife Management Area	Crawford		49 acres (20 ha)	
Barry State Game Area	Barry	42°36′11″N 85°25′56″W	16,692 acres (6,755 ha)	
Bear Creek Flooding State Wildlife Management Area	Roscommon	44°14′08″N 84°50′41″W	960 acres (390 ha)	
Beaver Islands State Wildlife Research Area	Charlevoix; Leelanau	45°37′15″N 85°32′24″W	25,270 acres (10,230 ha)	
Bentley Marsh Flooding State Wildlife Management Area	Gladwin	43°59′24″N 84°10′34″W	1,445 acres (585 ha)	
Betsie River State Game Area	Benzie	44°36′41″N 86°11′32″W	746 acres (302 ha)	
Bill Rollo Memorial Grouse Enhanced Management System	Marquette	46°11′16″N 87°31′00″W	6,595 acres (2,669 ha)	
Black Creek Flooding State Wildlife Management Area	Mackinac	46°13′34″N 85°42′44″W	2,777 acres (1,124 ha)	
Blendon Township State Game Area	Ottawa	42°53′37″N 85°59′52″W	180 acres (73 ha)	
Blind Sucker River Flooding State Wildlife Management Area	Luce	46°39′00″N 85°47′23″W	5,084 acres (2,057 ha)	
Blomgren's Marsh Flooding State Wildlife Management Area	Dickinson	45°52′36″N 87°47′38″W	570 acres (230 ha)	
Blue Bill Creek Grouse Enhanced Management System	Gogebic	46°18′26″N 89°32′55″W	9,772 acres (3,955 ha)	
Bluff Creek / US-10 / M-18 Floodings; State Wildlife Management Area	Midland	43°43′48″N 84°28′47″W	870 acres (350 ha)	
Boyle Lake State Wildlife Area	Berrien	41°52′45″N 86°27′14″W	338 acres (137 ha)	
Brookfield Township No. 1 State Game Area	Huron	43°42′58″N 83°14′14″W	204 acres (83 ha)	
Brookfield Township No. 2 State Game Area	Huron	43°45′11″N 83°15′18″W	40 acres (16 ha)	
Brownstown Prairie State Wildlife Area	Wayne	42°09′53″N 83°17′16″W	56 acres (23 ha)	
Bullock Ranch State Wildlife Management Area	Schoolcraft	46°21′11″N 86°02′22″W	13,360 acres (5,410 ha)	
Cannon Creek Flooding No. 1 State Wildlife Management Area	Missaukee	44°29′48″N 84°57′36″W	156 acres (63 ha)	
Cannon Creek Flooding No. 2 State Wildlife Management Area	Missaukee	44°29′25″N 84°58′30″W	92 acres (37 ha)	
Cannonsburg State Game Area	Kent	43°02′17″N 85°29′31″W	1,347 acres (545 ha)	
Cass City State Game Area	Sanilac; Tuscola	43°35′14″N 83°06′56″W	1,203 acres (487 ha)	
Cedar River Grouse Enhanced Management Systems	Menominee	45°26′33″N 87°25′39″W	3,088 acres (1,250 ha)	
Charlotte (Eaton Township) State Game Area	Eaton	42°31′25″N 84°49′24″W	39 acres (16 ha)	
Chelsea State Game Area	Washtenaw	42°20′00″N 83°58′28″W	799 acres (323 ha)	
Chesterfield Township State Game Area	Macomb	42°42′15″N 82°47′51″W	136 acres (55 ha)	
Clark Lake State Game Area	Tuscola	43°21′16″N 83°11′19″W	80 acres (32 ha)	
Columbia Township State Game Area	Tuscola	43°38′26″N 83°24′09″W	208 acres (84 ha)	
Conner's Marsh Flooding State Wildlife Management Area	Crawford	44°41′02″N 84°25′49″W	1,052 acres (426 ha)	
Cornish State Game Area	Van Buren	42°06′06″N 85°49′28″W	385 acres (156 ha)	
Cranberry Lake State Wildlife Management Area	Chippewa	45°58′48″N 84°00′13″W	263 acres (106 ha)	
Crane Pond State Game Area	Cass	41°55′41″N 85°50′54″W	4,218 acres (1,707 ha)	
Crystal Waters State Game Area	Monroe	42°04′19″N 83°34′02″W	680 acres (280 ha)	
Crow Island State Game Area	Bay; Saginaw	43°29′44″N 83°53′23″W	3,638 acres (1,472 ha)	
Cusino State Wildlife Research Area	Alger	46°21′49″N 86°28′54″W	1,538 acres (622 ha)	
Dansville State Game Area	Ingham	42°30′40″N 84°18′46″W	4,755 acres (1,924 ha)	
Davisburg State Wildlife Area	Oakland	42°45′17″N 83°31′22″W	110 acres (45 ha)	
Dead Stream Flooding State Wildlife Management Area	Missaukee; Roscommon	44°22′46″N 84°50′41″W	1,024 acres (414 ha)	
Deadman Swamp State Wildlife Management Area	St. Clair		1,885 acres (763 ha)	
Deer River Flooding State Wildlife Management Area	Iron	46°19′03″N 88°19′48″W	33 acres (13 ha)	
Deford State Game Area	Sanilac; Tuscola	43°30′46″N 83°15′53″W	10,390 acres (4,200 ha)	
Denmark Township State Game Area	Tuscola	43°28′30″N 83°37′18″W	95 acres (38 ha)	
Denton Creek Flooding State Wildlife Management Area	Roscommon	44°16′13″N 84°34′18″W	800 acres (320 ha)	
Devil's Lake / River Flooding State Wildlife Management Area	Alpena	45°00′52″N 83°29′23″W	912 acres (369 ha)	
Dingman Marsh Flooding State Wildlife Management Area	Cheboygan	45°42′50″N 84°41′06″W	4,860 acres (1,970 ha)	
Dog Lake Flooding State Wildlife Management Area	Cheboygan	45°17′20″N 84°24′13″W	810 acres (330 ha)	
Dollarville Flooding State Wildlife Management Area	Luce	46°21′02″N 85°34′54″W	3,000 acres (1,200 ha)	
Drummond Island Grouse Enhanced Management System	Chippewa	46°03′23″N 83°36′51″W	3,027 acres (1,225 ha)	
Drummond Island Pigeon Cove Flooding; State Wildlife Management Area	Chippewa	45°58′40″N 83°49′11″W	160 acres (65 ha)	
Edgar Waterfowl Production Area	Barry	42°38′51″N 85°23′10″W	157 acres (64 ha)	
Edmore State Game Area	Isabella; Montcalm	43°26′13″N 85°04′21″W	3,565 acres (1,443 ha)	
Elmwood Township State Game Area	Tuscola	43°37′16″N 83°16′20″W	271 acres (110 ha)	
Erie State Game Area	Monroe	41°44′57″N 83°28′18″W	3,603 acres (1,458 ha)	
Fabius State Game Area	St. Joseph	41°54′13″N 85°39′41″W	152 acres (62 ha)	
Felch Mountain State Wildlife Management Area	Dickinson	46°00′55″N 87°51′48″W	714 acres (289 ha)	
Fish Point State Wildlife Area	Tuscola	43°42′29″N 83°31′18″W	4,075 acres (1,649 ha)	
Flat River State Game Area	Ionia; Montcalm	43°07′40″N 85°11′40″W	11,235 acres (4,547 ha)	
Flynn Township State Game Area	Sanilac	43°17′21″N 82°56′31″W	264 acres (107 ha)	
Fraser Township No. 1 State Game Area	Bay	43°49′26″N 84°01′42″W	46 acres (19 ha)	
Fraser Township No. 2 State Game Area	Bay	43°46′54″N 84°01′27″W	35 acres (14 ha)	
French Farm Lake Flooding State Wildlife Management Area	Emmet	45°45′08″N 84°45′59″W	2,948 acres (1,193 ha)	
Friday State Wildlife Management Area	Luce		40 acres (16 ha)	
Fuller Woods State Game Area	Van Buren	42°16′30″N 86°02′10″W	85 acres (34 ha)	
Fulton State Game Area	Kalamazoo	42°05′59″N 85°19′08″W	672 acres (272 ha)	
Gagetown State Game Area	Huron; Tuscola	43°40′47″N 83°12′34″W	1,371 acres (555 ha)	
Garden Grade Grouse Enhanced Management Systems	Delta; Schoolcraft	45°52′17″N 86°29′20″W	6,170 acres (2,500 ha)	
Gene's Pond State Wildlife Management Area	Dickinson	46°04′23″N 87°51′57″W	3,450 acres (1,400 ha)	
Gladwin State Game Area	Gladwin	43°58′07″N 84°29′11″W	413 acres (167 ha)	
Gladwin Field Trial Area and Gladwin Wildlife Unit of the Gladwin Area State Forest	Gladwin	44°08′32″N 84°34′09″W	4,750 acres (1,920 ha)	
Gold Mine Grouse Enhanced Management Systems	Iron	46°12′50″N 88°44′28″W	890 acres (360 ha)	
Goose Creek Flooding State Wildlife Management Area	Kalkaska	44°45′48″N 84°51′31″W	60 acres (24 ha)	
Goose Lake State Game Area	Washtenaw	42°15′14″N 84°07′32″W	202 acres (82 ha)	
Gordon E. Guyer–Augusta Creek State Wildlife Area	Kalamazoo	42°23′52″N 85°21′29″W	386 acres (156 ha)	
Gourdneck State Game Area	Kalamazoo	42°10′28″N 85°38′20″W	2,165 acres (876 ha)	
Grand Haven State Game Area	Ottawa	43°02′22″N 86°09′12″W	1,099 acres (445 ha)	
Grand River State Game Area	Ionia	42°58′47″N 85°00′26″W	870 acres (350 ha)	
Grand River Gale Road State Game Area	Ingham	42°49′14″N 84°35′10″W	131 acres (53 ha)	
Grass Lake Flooding State Wildlife Management Area	Benzie	44°36′01″N 85°50′35″W	526 acres (213 ha)	
Grass Lake Marsh Flooding State Wildlife Management Area	Kalkaska; Missaukee	44°30′30″N 84°55′13″W	338 acres (137 ha)	
Grass Lake State Game Area	Jackson	42°14′48″N 84°13′46″W	125 acres (51 ha)	
Gratiot–Saginaw State Game Area	Gratiot; Saginaw	43°13′25″N 84°23′20″W	16,648 acres (6,737 ha)	
Greasy Creek Grouse Enhanced Management Systems	Montmorency	44°52′47″N 84°02′29″W	1,080 acres (440 ha)	
Gregory State Game Area	Livingston	42°29′39″N 84°02′51″W	2,705 acres (1,095 ha)	
Groveland Mine State Wildlife Management Area	Dickinson	45°57′29″N 87°59′15″W	6,240 acres (2,530 ha)	
Halifax Grouse Enhanced Management Systems	Luce	46°33′51″N 85°18′17″W	2,693 acres (1,090 ha)	
Hancock Creek Flooding State Wildlife Management Area	Dickinson	45°55′14″N 87°45′14″W	650 acres (260 ha)	
Hardwood Reservoir State Wildlife Management Area	Dickinson	46°00′33″N 87°43′32″W	1,394 acres (564 ha)	
Haymarsh Lake State Game Area	Mecosta	43°45′38″N 85°21′35″W	6,770 acres (2,740 ha)	
Hayward Lake to North Lake Flooding; State Wildlife Management Area	Menominee	45°22′30″N 87°29′28″W	3,184 acres (1,289 ha)	
Hazel Swamp Grouse Enhanced Management Systems	Houghton	46°50′40″N 88°44′08″W	2,383 acres (964 ha)	
Headquarters Lake Flooding State Wildlife Management Area	Grand Traverse	44°32′34″N 85°22′14″W	1,139 acres (461 ha)	
Hillcrest State Game Area	Livingston	42°35′07″N 83°59′40″W	257 acres (104 ha)	
Holly Wildlife Unit of Holly State Recreation Area	Oakland	42°50′07″N 83°31′00″W	2,930 acres (1,190 ha)	
Horseshoe Lake State Game Area	Oakland	42°52′07″N 83°16′11″W	418 acres (169 ha)	
Houghton Lake Flats North Flooding; State Wildlife Management Area	Roscommon	44°23′02″N 84°48′59″W	838 acres (339 ha)	
Houghton Lake Flats South Flooding; State Wildlife Management Area	Roscommon	44°21′46″N 84°48′59″W	992 acres (401 ha)	
Houghton Lake State Wildlife Research Area	Missaukee; Roscommon	44°18′00″N 84°51′43″W	12,130 acres (4,910 ha)	
Hubbard Lake State Game Area	Alcona	44°45′36″N 83°34′12″W	522 acres (211 ha)	
Kawkawlin Creek Flooding State Wildlife Management Area	Midland	43°47′09″N 84°17′40″W	2,933 acres (1,187 ha)	
Keeler State Game Area	Van Buren	42°06′59″N 86°12′51″W	367 acres (149 ha)	
Kinney Waterfowl Production Area	Van Buren	42°06′08″N 85°49′23″W	78 acres (32 ha)	
Lake–36 State Wildlife Management Area	Dickinson		968 acres (392 ha)	
Lake DuBonnet Flooding State Wildlife Management Area	Grand Traverse	44°40′55″N 85°47′47″W	1,715 acres (694 ha)	
Lake Interstate State Game Area	Eaton	42°39′48″N 84°41′12″W	123 acres (50 ha)	
Lake LaVasseur Flooding State Wildlife Management Area	Marquette	46°28′45″N 87°12′55″W	403 acres (163 ha)	
Lame Duck Area Grouse Enhanced Management System	Gladwin	44°04′51″N 84°13′09″W	11,331 acres (4,585 ha)	
Langston State Game Area	Montcalm	43°19′21″N 85°16′29″W	3,257 acres (1,318 ha)	
Lapeer State Game Area	Lapeer	43°08′27″N 83°20′34″W	8,599 acres (3,480 ha)	
Lee Grande Ranch Grouse Enhanced Management System	Cheboygan	45°25′31″N 84°24′46″W	2,400 acres (970 ha)	
Leidy Lake State Game Area	St. Joseph	41°58′40″N 85°23′17″W	109 acres (44 ha)	
Little Betsie Grouse Enhanced Management Systems	Benzie	44°32′44″N 85°53′39″W	4,167 acres (1,686 ha)	
Little Fox River Flooding / Stanley Lake Flooding; State Wildlife Management Area	Schoolcraft	46°29′08″N 86°08′59″W	2,550 acres (1,030 ha)	
Little Widewaters Flooding State Wildlife Management Area	Lake	44°01′56″N 85°46′27″W	367 acres (149 ha)	
Lost Nation State Game Area	Hillsdale	41°51′16″N 84°30′33″W	2,471 acres (1,000 ha)	
Malan Waterfowl Production Area	Jackson	45°24′06″N 84°10′11″W	141 acres (57 ha)	
Manistee River State Game Area	Manistee	44°15′18″N 86°14′54″W	4,379 acres (1,772 ha)	
Manitou Island Group	Leelanau	45°06′51″N 86°00′39″W	19,750 acres (7,990 ha)	
Maple River State Game Area	Clinton; Gratiot; Ionia	46°06′56″N 84°40′33″W	9,252 acres (3,744 ha)	
Maple–River / Gratiot–Saginaw Connector State Game Area	Gratiot	43°10′16″N 84°27′52″W	311 acres (126 ha)	
Mark Knee Memorial Grouse Enhanced Management Systems	Osceola	43°59′44″N 85°23′04″W	4,090 acres (1,660 ha)	
Marsh Creek / Beaver Lake Flooding; State Wildlife Management Area	Roscommon	44°23′05″N 84°23′20″W	554 acres (224 ha)	
Martiny Lake State Game Area	Mecosta	43°42′39″N 85°13′16″W	7,660 acres (3,100 ha)	
Melstrand Grouse Enhanced Management Systems	Alger	46°27′06″N 86°25′56″W	1,225 acres (496 ha)	
Middleville State Game Area	Barry	42°43′13″N 85°23′20″W	4,583 acres (1,855 ha)	
Minden City State Game Area	Sanilac	43°37′04″N 82°57′38″W	9,199 acres (3,723 ha)	
Molasses River Flooding No. 1 State Wildlife Management Area	Gladwin	44°05′38″N 84°12′38″W	1,642 acres (664 ha)	
Molasses River Flooding No. 2 State Wildlife Management Area	Gladwin	44°04′57″N 84°13′36″W	1,510 acres (610 ha)	
Molasses River Flooding No. 3 State Wildlife Management Area	Gladwin	43°56′56″N 84°11′34″W	1,885 acres (763 ha)	
Molasses River Flooding No. 5 State Wildlife Management Area	Gladwin	43°59′10″N 84°11′08″W	1,460 acres (590 ha)	
Mosinee Grouse Enhanced Management Systems	Gogebic	46°21′38″N 89°56′13″W	1,136 acres (460 ha)	
Mud Creek Flooding State Wildlife Management Area	Cheboygan		18 acres (7.3 ha)	
Munuscong State Wildlife Management Area	Chippewa	46°12′50″N 84°16′51″W	19,202 acres (7,771 ha)	
Murphy Lake State Game Area	Tuscola	43°17′29″N 83°27′38″W	2,717 acres (1,100 ha)	
Muskegon State Game Area	Muskegon; Newaygo	43°17′05″N 86°05′47″W	15,345 acres (6,210 ha)	
Muskegon County Wastewater Management System	Muskegon	43°15′40″N 86°02′20″W	8,411 acres (3,404 ha)	
Muskrat Lake State Game Area	Clinton	42°54′51″N 84°35′25″W	212 acres (86 ha)	
Nayanquing Point State Wildlife Area	Bay	43°47′02″N 83°56′49″W	4,340 acres (1,760 ha)	
Nestoria Creek Flooding State Wildlife Management Area	Baraga	46°33′53″N 88°14′44″W	125 acres (51 ha)	
Net River Flooding State Wildlife Management Area	Baraga	46°25′44″N 88°30′50″W	520 acres (210 ha)	
Oak Grove State Game Area	Livingston	42°44′04″N 83°53′07″W	2,453 acres (993 ha)	
Old Fur Farm Flooding (Floodwood Swamp); State Wildlife Management Area	Clare	44°06′11″N 84°55′03″W	265 acres (107 ha)	
Olive Township State Game Area	Ottawa	42°53′07″N 86°03′23″W	247 acres (100 ha)	
Oliver Township State Game Area	Huron	43°49′09″N 83°07′21″W	130 acres (53 ha)	
O'Neal Lake Flooding State Wildlife Management Area	Emmet	45°42′45″N 84°54′16″W	1,246 acres (504 ha)	
Onsted State Game Area	Lenawee	42°02′41″N 84°14′43″W	876 acres (355 ha)	
Osceola–Missaukee Grasslands State Game Area	Missaukee; Osceola	44°09′08″N 85°08′11″W	1,211 acres (490 ha)	
Pentwater River State Game Area	Oceana	43°44′37″N 86°25′22″W	2,545 acres (1,030 ha)	
Pere Marquette State Game Area	Mason	43°55′50″N 86°25′02″W	402 acres (163 ha)	
Petersburg State Game Area	Monroe	41°52′43″N 83°41′45″W	537 acres (217 ha)	
Peterson Pond Flooding State Wildlife Management Area	Menominee	45°33′25″N 87°26′03″W	30 acres (12 ha)	
Petobego State Game Area	Antrim; Grand Traverse	44°51′13″N 85°26′00″W	787 acres (318 ha)	
Pike Lake Flooding State Wildlife Management Area	Houghton	45°33′25″N 87°26′03″W	787 acres (318 ha)	
Pinconning Township (Cody–Esty Road) State Game Area	Bay	43°52′07″N 84°01′08″W	51 acres (21 ha)	
Pointe Aux Peaux State Wildlife Area	Monroe	41°56′50″N 83°16′16″W	224 acres (91 ha)	
Pointe Mouillee State Game Area	Monroe; Wayne	42°01′40″N 83°12′23″W	7,483 acres (3,028 ha)	
Port Huron State Game Area	St. Clair	43°03′09″N 82°35′34″W	6,858 acres (2,775 ha)	
Portage Marsh State Wildlife Management Area	Delta	45°42′24″N 87°04′46″W	655 acres (265 ha)	
Portland State Game Area	Clinton; Ionia	42°48′49″N 84°55′04″W	2,373 acres (960 ha)	
Potagannissing Flooding State Wildlife Management Area	Chippewa	46°02′16″N 83°35′54″W	2,220 acres (900 ha)	
Quanicassee State Wildlife Area	Bay; Tuscola	43°36′07″N 83°43′10″W	4,335 acres (1,754 ha)	
Rainy River Flooding State Wildlife Management Area	Montmorency	45°11′44″N 84°04′32″W	1,422 acres (575 ha)	
Ralph Grouse Enhanced Management System	Dickinson	46°06′45″N 87°50′33″W	5,350 acres (2,170 ha)	
Robinson Creek Floodings State Wildlife Management Area	Roscommon	44°26′35″N 84°35′08″W	2,572 acres (1,041 ha)	
Rogue River State Game Area	Kent	43°15′48″N 85°40′32″W	6,135 acres (2,483 ha)	
Rose Lake State Wildlife Area	Clinton; Shiawassee	42°48′23″N 84°22′29″W	4,071 acres (1,647 ha)	
Rush Lake State Game Area	Huron	43°58′28″N 83°11′26″W	2,289 acres (926 ha)	
Russell Lake / Lake St. Helen State Wildlife Management Area	Roscommon		950 acres (380 ha)	
Sage Lakes Flooding State Wildlife Management Area	Montmorency	44°53′37″N 84°08′56″W	287 acres (116 ha)	
Salt River Marsh State Wildlife Area	Macomb	42°39′42″N 82°46′45″W	60 acres (24 ha)	
Sand River / Jeske Flooding State Wildlife Management Area	Marquette	46°29′07″N 87°07′43″W	556 acres (225 ha)	
Sandusky State Game Area	Sanilac	43°24′22″N 82°47′18″W	1,480 acres (600 ha)	
Sanilac State Game Area	Sanilac	43°38′02″N 83°02′13″W	1,577 acres (638 ha)	
Saranac–Lowell State Game Area	Kent; Ionia	42°57′06″N 85°18′39″W	1,863 acres (754 ha)	
Schlee Waterfowl Production Area	Jackson	42°13′59″N 84°14′15″W	160 acres (65 ha)	
Schoonover Waterfowl Production Area	Lenawee	41°48′40″N 84°12′38″W	95 acres (38 ha)	
Sharonville State Game Area	Jackson; Washtenaw	42°10′55″N 84°09′44″W	4,387 acres (1,775 ha)	
Shiawassee River State Game Area	Saginaw	43°19′02″N 84°06′08″W	10,152 acres (4,108 ha)	
Skegemog Lake Wildlife Unit of Pere Marquette State Forest	Antrim; Kalkaska	44°48′58″N 85°17′38″W	2,109 acres (853 ha)	
Somerset State Game Area	Hillsdale	42°01′40″N 84°23′33″W	748 acres (303 ha)	
Sportsman's Pond (or Sportman's Lake) Flooding; State Wildlife Management Area	Montmorency	45°02′50″N 84°07′09″W	97 acres (39 ha)	
Spring Creek State Game Area	St. Joseph	42°03′41″N 85°35′35″W	97 acres (39 ha)	
St. Clair Flats State Wildlife Area	St. Clair	42°36′24″N 82°38′06″W	30,158 acres (12,205 ha)	
St. Clair Township State Game Area	Macomb	42°50′34″N 82°32′45″W	112 acres (45 ha)	
St. John's Marsh State Wildlife Area	St. Clair	42°38′39″N 82°36′34″W	3,060 acres (1,240 ha)	
Stanton State Game Area	Montcalm	43°15′44″N 85°04′33″W	4,725 acres (1,912 ha)	
Stoney Creek Flooding State Wildlife Management Area	Cheboygan	43°23′23″N 84°24′25″W	1,150 acres (470 ha)	
Strickler Grouse Enhanced Management System	Mackinac	46°07′42″N 85°17′22″W	2,180 acres (880 ha)	
Sturgeon River Sloughs State Wildlife Management Area	Baraga; Houghton	46°55′53″N 88°29′15″W	8,964 acres (3,628 ha)	
Tamarack Lake State Game Area	Eaton	42°43′44″N 85°03′09″W	237 acres (96 ha)	
Three Rivers State Game Area	Cass; St. Joseph	41°51′49″N 85°44′42″W	2,125 acres (860 ha)	
Tobico Marsh Wildlife Unit of Bay City State Park	Bay	43°41′28″N 83°55′43″W	2,106 acres (852 ha)	
Tomahawk Creek Flooding State Wildlife Management Area	Presque Isle	45°12′47″N 84°11′02″W	170 acres (69 ha)	
Townline Creek Flooding State Wildlife Management Area	Clare; Roscommon	44°09′56″N 84°44′46″W	662 acres (268 ha)	
Tuscola State Game Area	Tuscola	43°46′48″N 82°52′54″W	9,259 acres (3,747 ha)	
Unadilla State Wildlife Area	Livingston; Washtenaw	42°26′11″N 84°06′43″W	1,163 acres (471 ha)	
Vassar State Game Area	Tuscola	43°24′39″N 83°29′32″W	3,436 acres (1,390 ha)	
Verona State Game Area	Huron	43°47′01″N 82°52′53″W	7,695 acres (3,114 ha)	
Vestaburg State Game Area	Montaclm	43°22′44″N 83°56′15″W	2,933 acres (1,187 ha)	
Waterloo Wildlife Unit of Waterloo State Recreation Area	Jackson; Washtenaw	42°19′05″N 84°11′33″W	5,776 acres (2,337 ha)	
Webster Lake (Berrien Township No. 1) State Game Area	Berrien	41°54′22″N 86°18′18″W	42 acres (17 ha)	
Wigwam Bay State Wildlife Area	Arenac	43°59′40″N 83°46′39″W	3,390 acres (1,370 ha)	
Wildfowl Bay State Wildlife Area	Huron	43°49′44″N 83°26′03″W	2,313 acres (936 ha)	
Windsor Township State Game Area	Eaton	42°40′49″N 84°40′20″W	356 acres (144 ha)	
Wraco Lodge Lake Flooding State Wildlife Management Area	Roscommon		2,016 acres (816 ha)	

== See also ==
- List of Michigan state parks
- Michigan Department of Natural Resources
- Protected areas of Michigan
