= Indiana State Road 39 =

Highway in Indiana

State Road 39
- SR 39 highlighted in red

Route information
- Maintained by INDOT
- Existed: October 1, 1926–present

Southern section
- Length: 14.91 mi (24.00 km)
- South end: SR 56 near Scottsburg
- North end: SR 250 near Brownstown

Northern section
- Length: 179.7 mi (289.2 km)
- South end: I-69 in Martinsville
- Major intersections: I-70 near Monrovia; US 40 in Belleville; US 36 in Danville; I-74 in Lizton; I-65 / US 52 in Lebanon; US 24 in Monticello; US 30 near Hanna; US 6 near Kingsbury I-80 Toll / I-90 Toll / Indiana Toll Road near La Porte; US 20 in Springville
- North end: M-239 to I-94 near New Buffalo, Michigan

Location
- Country: United States
- State: Indiana
- Counties: Boone, Carroll, Clinton, Hendricks, Jackson, LaPorte, Morgan, Pulaski, Starke, Washington, White

Highway system
- Indiana State Highway System; Interstate; US; State; Scenic
← SR 38	→ US 40

State Road 39 (SR 39) in the U.S. state of Indiana is the name of two distinct north–south highways.

== Route description ==
=== Southern section ===
Located in south-central Indiana, the shorter southern section of SR 39 begins at SR 56 west of Scottsburg. It runs north and passes through Little York, then ends at an intersection with SR 250 just before reaching Brownstown.

=== Northern section ===
The much longer northern section starts at I-69 in Martinsville, southwest of Indianapolis, and runs north to the Michigan border near I-94 (via M-239). Along the route, it passes through these towns (from south to north):

- Martinsville (Southern Terminus, Intersects I-69 in Southern Martinsville and SR 67 in Northern Martinsville (Goes under a concurrency with SR 67)
- Monrovia (intersects SR 42)
- Danville (intersects US 36)
- Lizton (interchange with I-74)
- Lebanon (interchange with I-65 exit 139)
- Frankfort (start of US 421 concurrency)
- Rossville (concurrent with US 421)
- Delphi (concurrent with US 421)
- Monticello (end of US 421 concurrency)
- Buffalo (concurrency with SR 16)
- North Judson (concurrency with SR 10)
- LaPorte (concurrency with US 35 and SR 2)
- Springville (intersects US 20)

== History ==
=== Northern section ===
In the 1960s, SR 39 was the connector between the west end of I-94 (which ended just north of the Michigan-Indiana border) and the Indiana Toll Road. Hence, a dozen miles of this winding 2-lane road carried all the heavy traffic between Chicago and Detroit.

In 2010, the section of SR 39 between Monrovia and Belleville was greatly improved and re-paved.

=== Southern section ===
At one point, SR 39 had a section from US 31 in Henryville to SR 3 in Charlestown. It was later decommissioned when SR 160 was extended to end in Charlestown.

== Major intersections ==
County	Location	mi	km	Destinations	Notes
Washington	Gibson Township	0.00	0.00	SR 56 – Salem, Scottsburg	Southern terminus of SR 39
Washington	Gibson Township	5.57	8.96	SR 256 east – Austin	Western terminus of SR 256
Jackson	Brownstown Township	14.91	24.00	SR 250	Northern terminus of the southern section of SR 39
Gap in route
Morgan	Martinsville	14.91	24.00	I-69 – Evansville, Indianapolis	Exit 137 on I-69; Southern terminus of the northern section of SR 39
Morgan	Jefferson Township	18.12	29.16	SR 67 south – Spencer	Southern end of SR 67 concurrency
Morgan	Jefferson Township	21.46	34.54	SR 67 north – Indianapolis	Northern end of SR 67 concurrency
Morgan	Gregg Township	23.59	37.96	SR 142 west – Eminence	Eastern terminus of SR 142
Morgan	Monrovia	29.10	46.83	SR 42 west – Crown Center	Southern end of SR 42 concurrency
Morgan	Monrovia			SR 42 east – Mooresville	Northern end of SR 42 concurrency
Hendricks	Liberty Township	31.47	50.65	I-70 – Terre Haute, Indianapolis, St. Louis	Exit 59 on I-70
Hendricks	Clayton	34.95	56.25	US 40 – Terre Haute, Plainfield, Indianapolis	
Hendricks	Danville	43.44	69.91	US 36 east – Avon, Indianapolis	Eastern end of US 36 concurrency
Hendricks	Danville	43.79	70.47	US 36 west – Rockville	Western end of US 36 concurrency
Hendricks	Center Township	45.12	72.61	SR 236 west – North Salem	Eastern terminus of SR 236
Hendricks	Lizton	52.20	84.01	US 136 – Crawfordsville, Brownsburg	
Hendricks	Lizton	52.80	84.97	I-74 – Indianapolis, Danville	Exit 58 on I-74
Boone	Lebanon	63.69	102.50	I-65 / US 52 – Gary, Lafayette, Indianapolis	Exit 139 on I-65
Boone	Lebanon	64.55	103.88	SR 32 – Crawfordsville, Noblesville	
Boone	Pike	70.01	112.67	SR 47 – Crawfordsville, Elizaville	
Clinton	Cyclone	77.09	124.06	SR 38 east – Noblesville	Southern end of SR 38 concurrency
Clinton	Frankfort			US 421 south / SR 28 – Indianapolis	Southern end of US 421 concurrency
Clinton	Frankfort			SR 75 north – Flora	Southern terminus of SR 75
Clinton	Ross Township	80.64	129.78	SR 38 west – Lafayette	Northern end of SR 38 concurrency
Clinton	Rossville			SR 26 – Lafayette, Kokomo	
Carroll	Deer Creek Township			SR 18 east – Marion	Southern end of SR 18 concurrency
Carroll	Delphi			SR 25 – Lafayette, Logansport	
Carroll	Tippecanoe Township			SR 18 west – Brookston	Northern end of SR 18 concurrency
White	Monticello	103.16	166.02	US 24 west / US 421 north – Reynolds	Northern end of US 421 concurrency; western end of US 24 concurrency
White	Union Township	104.44	168.08	US 24 east – Logansport	Eastern end of US 24 concurrency
White	Buffalo	129.50	208.41	SR 16 east / SR 119 north – Royal Center, Winamac	Eastern end of SR 16 concurrency; Southern terminus of SR 119
White	Liberty Township	131.11	211.00	SR 16 west – Monon	Western end of SR 16 concurrency
Pulaski	Jefferson Township	142.99	230.12	SR 14 – Parr, Winamac	
Starke	North Judson	153.94	247.74	SR 10 west – Demotte	Western end of SR 10 concurrency
Starke	Wayne Township	158.01	254.29	SR 10 east – Bass Lake	Eastern end of SR 10 concurrency
Starke	Jackson Township	163.02	262.36	SR 8 – Kouts, Knox	
LaPorte	Hanna Township	169.23	272.35	US 30 / Lincoln Highway – Valparaiso, Plymouth	
LaPorte	Noble Township	176.97	284.81	US 6 – Westville, Nappanee	
LaPorte	La Porte	182.62	293.90	SR 2 west – Valparaiso	Southern end of SR 2 concurrency
LaPorte	La Porte	183.93	296.01	US 35 south / SR 2 east to SR 4 – Logansport, South Bend	Northern end of SR 2 concurrency; Southern end of US 35 concurrency
LaPorte	La Porte	185.79	299.00	US 35 north – Michigan City	Northern end of US 35 concurrency
LaPorte	Center Township	187.94	302.46	I-80 Toll / I-90 Toll / Indiana Toll Road – Gary, South Bend, Chicago	Exit 49 on the Indiana Toll Road
LaPorte	Springfield Township	189.47	304.92	US 20 – Michigan City, South Bend	
LaPorte	Springfield Township	194.61	313.19	M-239 north – New Buffalo	Northern terminus at Michigan state line
1.000 mi = 1.609 km; 1.000 km = 0.621 mi: Concurrency terminus
