= Gregg Township, Pennsylvania =

Gregg Township is the name of some places in the U.S. state of Pennsylvania:

- Gregg Township, Centre County, Pennsylvania
- Gregg Township, Union County, Pennsylvania

== See also ==
- Gregg Township, Morgan County, Indiana
