= Indiana State Road 42 =

Highway in Indiana

State Road 42
- SR 42 highlighted in red

Route information
- Maintained by INDOT
- Length: 62.705 mi (100.914 km)
- Existed: 1932–present

Major junctions
- West end: US 40 near Terre Haute
- US 231 at Cloverdale
- East end: SR 67 / SR 144 near Mooresville

Location
- Country: United States
- State: Indiana
- Counties: Vigo, Clay, Owen, Putnam, Morgan

Highway system
- Indiana State Highway System; Interstate; US; State; Scenic
← US 41	→ SR 43

State Road 42 (SR 42) is an east–west road in Central Indiana. Its western terminus is at US 40 in Terre Haute. Its eastern terminus is at State Road 67 and State Road 144 in Mooresville.

== Route description ==
From the western terminus with US 40, SR 42 heads east out of Terre Haute, paralleling Interstate 70 (I-70). Before leaving Terre Haute SR 42 passes by the Terre Haute International Airport. SR 42 heads east from Terre Haute passing over I-70. SR 42 then has an intersection with State Road 59. After SR 59, SR 42 still parallels I-70 but the distance between the two routes is greater. SR 42 heads east passing through an intersection with U.S. Route 231. SR 42 heads due east then just south of Eminence SR 42 turns due north and heads through Eminence. SR 42 turns back east north of Eminence and now SR 42 parallels I-70. SR 42 passes through Crown Center and then SR 42 enters Monrovia. In Monrovia, SR 42 has an intersection with State Road 39. SR 42 heads east out of Monrovia, heading towards Mooresville. In Mooreville SR 42 has intersections with State Road 267 and SR 67/SR 144.

== Major intersections ==
County	Location	mi	km	Destinations	Notes
Vigo	Terre Haute	0.000	0.000	US 40 – Terre Haute	Western terminus of SR 42
Clay	Posey Township	11.351	18.268	SR 59 – Clay City, Brazil	
Owen	Jackson Township	27.295	43.927	SR 243 north – Lieber State Recreation Area	Southern terminus of SR 243
Putnam	Cloverdale	32.893	52.936	US 231 – Cloverdale, Spencer	
Morgan	Eminence	42.596	68.552	SR 142 east – Martinsville	Western terminus of SR 142
Morgan	Monrovia	55.589	89.462	SR 39 south – Martinsville	Western end of SR 39 concurrency
Morgan	Monrovia	55.617	89.507	SR 39 north to I-70 – Belleville	Eastern end of SR 39 concurrency
Morgan	Mooresville	62.705	100.914	SR 67 / SR 144 east – Indianapolis, Brooklyn	Eastern terminus of SR 42; Western terminus of SR 144
1.000 mi = 1.609 km; 1.000 km = 0.621 mi: Concurrency terminus
