= Indiana State Road 142 =

Highway in Indiana

State Road 142
- SR 142 highlighted in red

Route information
- Maintained by INDOT
- Length: 10.187 mi (16.394 km)
- Existed: 1934–present

Major junctions
- West end: SR 42 in Eminence
- East end: SR 39 near Wilbur

Location
- Country: United States
- State: Indiana
- Counties: Morgan

Highway system
- Indiana State Highway System; Interstate; US; State; Scenic
← SR 140	→ SR 143

State Road 142 (SR 142) is a State Road in the western section of the state of Indiana. Running for about 10.19 miles (16.40 km) in a general east–west direction, connecting rural portions of Morgan County, passing through Wilbur. The entire road is two-lanes and passes through farmland and wooded areas. SR 142 was originally introduced in 1934 to connect Eminence to SR 39. The road was paved by the late 1960s.

== Route description ==
SR 142 begins at an intersection with SR 42 in Eminence in western Morgan County. The highway proceeds due east into Morgan County as a two-lane road, passing through farmland. The road becomes curvy as it enters a wooded area. SR 142 passes through the unincorporated community of Wilbur, before ending at SR 39. The highest traffic count is at the eastern end of SR 142, where 1,557 vehicles travel the highway on average each day. The lowest traffic count is west of Wilbur, where 1,045 vehicles travel the highway on average each day.

== History ==
The Indiana State Highway Commission designated SR 142 in 1934. The original routing started at SR 42 in Eminence and ran east to SR 39 much as it does today. The road between Eminence and Wilbur had a gravel or stone surface, while the road east of Wilbur was under construction. In 1935 the construction east of Wilbur was completed and the road surface was either gravel or stone. The highway commissioned paved the entire road between 1966 and 1967. Since its paving, SR 142 has not undergone any major changes.

== Major intersections ==
The entire route is in Morgan County.

Location	mi	km	Destinations	Notes
Eminence	0.000	0.000	SR 42 – Cloverdale	Western terminus of SR 142
Clay Township	10.187	16.394	SR 39 – Monrovia, Martinsville	Eastern terminus of SR 142
1.000 mi = 1.609 km; 1.000 km = 0.621 mi
