= Eminence High School =

Eminence High School may refer to:

- Eminence High School in Eminence, Missouri
- Eminence High School in Eminence, Kentucky
- Eminence Junior-Senior High School in Eminence, Indiana
