= M-239 (Michigan highway) =

State highway in New Buffalo Township, Berrien County, Michigan, United States

M-239
- M-239 highlighted in red

Route information
- Maintained by MDOT
- Length: 1.136 mi (1.828 km)
- Existed: 1963–present

Major junctions
- South end: SR 39 south of New Buffalo
- North end: I-94 near New Buffalo

Location
- Country: United States
- State: Michigan
- Counties: Berrien

Highway system
- Michigan State Trunkline Highway System; Interstate; US; State; Byways
← M-231	→ M-247

M-239 is a north–south state trunkline highway in Berrien County in the extreme southwestern corner of the US state of Michigan connecting State Road 39 (SR 39) in Indiana to Interstate 94 (I-94). The highway was designated in 1963, and it provided the only connection from the southern end of I-94 into Indiana until 1972.

== Route description ==
As SR 39 crosses into Michigan it becomes M-239. As soon as it crosses the border, the road curves around to the northwest where it continues through a generally rural area. The trunkline intersects Wilson Road and passes next to a commercial development. After a little over a mile (1.8 km), the road comes to its northern terminus at an interchange with I-94 at exit 1. While M-239 officially ends at the interchange, the roadway, known as Harbor Country Drive, continues to the northwest and into New Buffalo, providing access to US Highway 12. Like other state highways in Michigan, M-239 is maintained by the Michigan Department of Transportation (MDOT). In 2011, the department's traffic surveys showed that on average, 6,231 vehicles used the highway daily. No section of M-239 is listed on the National Highway System, a network of roads important to the country's economy, defense, and mobility.

== History ==
M-239 always ended at I-94, even though Harbor Country Drive continues into New Buffalo. Before completion of the Indiana portion of I-94, the freeway ended at the present exit 1. A 1.1-mile-long (1.8 km) stretch of LaPorte Road (Note: LaPorte Road was renamed to Harbor Country Drive in 2009.) was designated as M-239 in 1963 to carry traffic to SR 39, which connects to the Indiana Toll Road. Until 1972, when Indiana constructed their section of I-94, M-239 and SR 39 were the only connection from the southern end of I-94 in Michigan across the state line. That year, the highway carried more than 15,000 vehicles a day.

== Major intersections ==
The entire highway is in New Buffalo Township, Berrien County.

mi	km	Destinations	Notes
0.000	0.000	SR 39 south to Indiana Toll Road – La Porte	Indiana state line
1.136	1.828	I-94 – Detroit, Chicago	
1.000 mi = 1.609 km; 1.000 km = 0.621 mi
