= Eminence, Indiana =

- Census-designated place
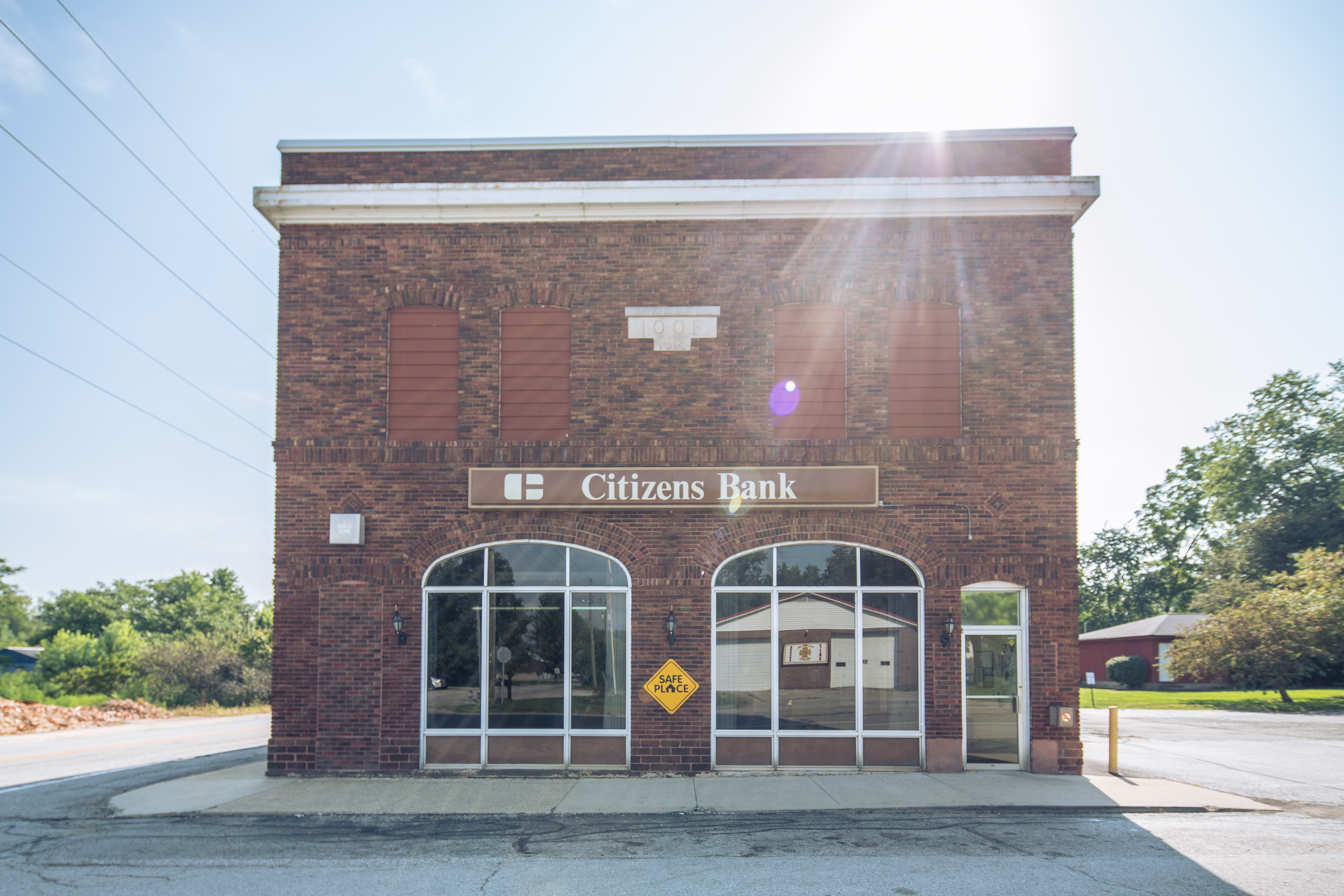

- Location within Indiana Location within the United States
- Coordinates: 39°31′17″N 86°38′33″W
- Country: United States
- State: Indiana
- County: Morgan
- Township: Adams

Area
  - Total: 0.30 sq mi (0.78 km^{2})
  - Land: 0.30 sq mi (0.78 km^{2})
  - Water: 0.0 sq mi (0 km^{2})
- Elevation: 784 ft (239 m)
- Time zone: UTC-5 (Eastern (EST))
  - Summer (DST): UTC-4 (EDT)
- ZIP code: 46125
- FIPS code: 18-21106
- GNIS feature ID: 2830472

Eminence is an unincorporated community and census-designated place (CDP) in Adams Township, Morgan County, in the U.S. state of Indiana.

== History ==
Eminence was laid out in July 1855 by William Wigal. The name possibly is commendatory; but according to some accounts it is topographically descriptive.

The post office at Eminence has been in operation since 1857.

== Geography ==
Eminence is in western Morgan County at the intersection of State Roads 42 and 142. SR 42 leads northeast 12 miles (19 km) to Monrovia and west 10 miles (16 km) to Cloverdale, while SR 142 leads east 10 miles to SR 39, 7 miles (11 km) north of Martinsville, the Morgan county seat.

According to the U.S. Census Bureau, the Eminence CDP has an area of 0.30 square miles (0.78 km^{2}), all land. The community drains northwest to the valley of Mill Creek, which runs southwest to the Eel River, a tributary of the White River.

== Demographics ==
The United States Census Bureau first delineated Eminence as a census designated place in the 2022 American Community Survey.

== Education ==
Eminence is home to the Eels of Eminence Junior-Senior High School.

Eminence has a public library, a branch of the Morgan County Public Library.

== Notable people ==
Glenn M. Curtis, four-time Indiana state champion basketball coach (Lebanon & Martinsville) and coach at Indiana State and the high school coach of John Wooden.
