= M-247 (Michigan highway) =

State highway in Bangor Township, Bay County, Michigan, United States

M-247
- M-247 highlighted in red

Route information
- Maintained by MDOT
- Length: 3.036 mi (4.886 km)
- Existed: 1961–present

Major junctions
- South end: M-13 near Bay City
- North end: Bay City Recreation Area

Location
- Country: United States
- State: Michigan
- Counties: Bay

Highway system
- Michigan State Trunkline Highway System; Interstate; US; State; Byways
← M-239	→ I-275

M-247 is a north–south state trunkline highway in the US state of Michigan, connecting M-13 to the Bay City Recreation Area, entirely within Bangor Township. As a state trunkline, M-247 runs north from M-13 before turning to access the park, a distance of 3.036 miles (4.886 km). The highway carries just over 6,000 vehicles a day on average. The roadway has been part of the state trunkline highway system since the 1920s, and from 1961 until 1998, it was the highest non-Interstate highway in the state. Before it was given the M-247 designation, the roadway has been a part of M-111 and M-47.

== Route description ==
Starting at its southern terminus at M-13, M-247 follows Euclid Avenue north about 2.7 miles (4.3 km), crossing the Kawkawlin River. When it meets Beaver Road, M-247 turns east leading directly into the state park and ends at its entrance. The entire roadway passes through suburban Bay City near the Saginaw Bay. None of the highway is listed on the National Highway System, a system of regionally important highways.

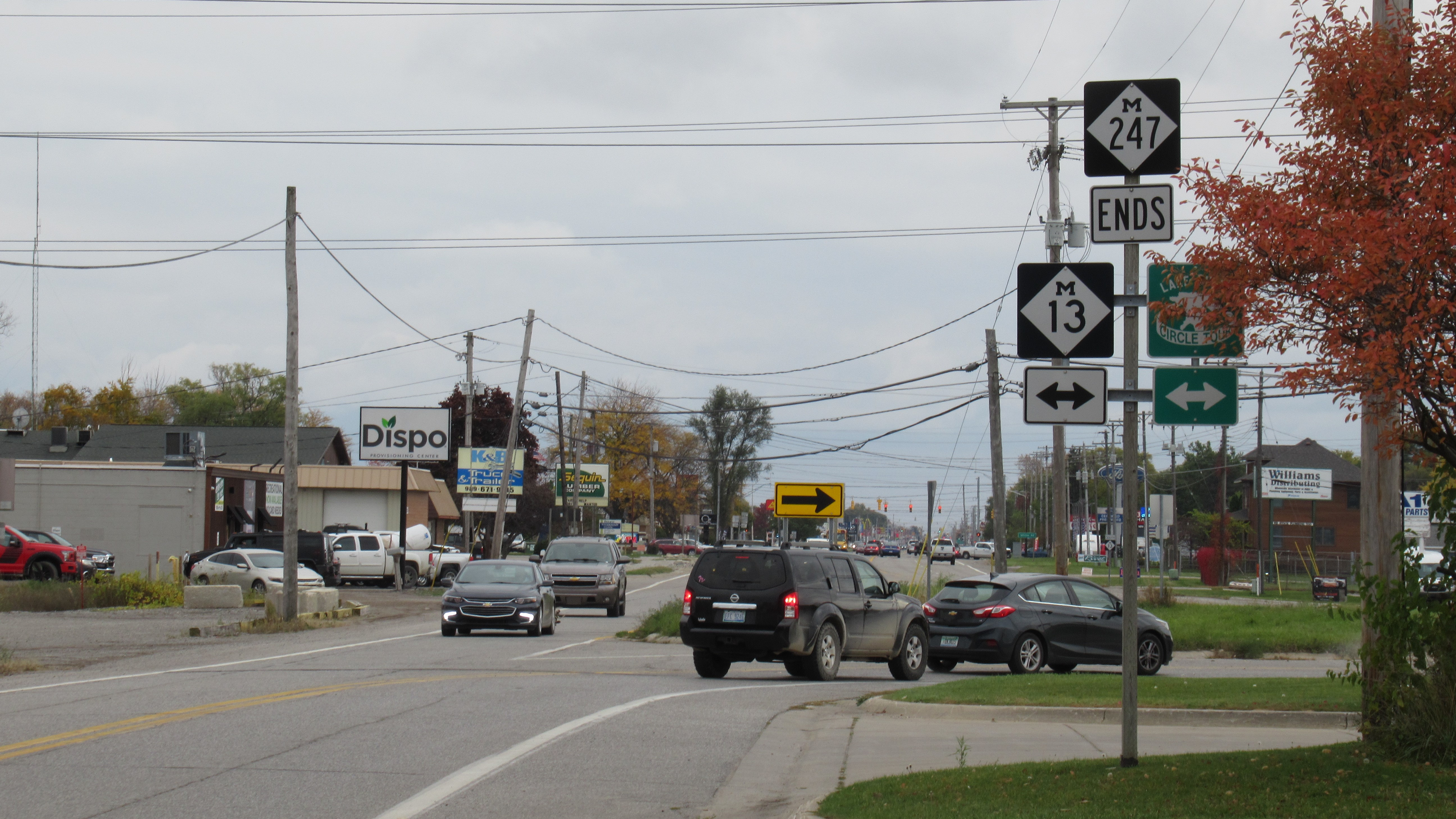
Southern terminus of M-247 at M-13

The Michigan Department of Transportation (MDOT) measures the traffic volumes on its highways using a calculation called average annual daily traffic (AADT). This value is an expression of the number of vehicles that use a section of roadway on any average day of the year. When the department surveyed M-247 in 2009, the southernmost section near M-13 carried 6,135 vehicles; the remainder carried 6,224 vehicles. As a subset of these figures, 190 commercial vehicles used the trunkline on average. This was an overall increase from 2008 when the sections carried 5,031 and 5,573 vehicles respectively, but a decrease from the 214 commercial vehicles.

== History ==
By 1929, the first highway designation along the current M-247 was assigned. That first number was M-111, which lasted until 1937 when all of M-111 became part of M-47. In early 1961, the roadway changed numbers once more. This time M-47 was realigned to a former section of US Highway 10 (US 10), and the connection to the state park was assigned the M-247 designation. This was the highest highway number in the state, excluding Interstates, until the 1998 designation of M-553 in the Upper Peninsula.

== Major intersections ==
The entire highway is in Bangor Township, Bay County.

mi	km	Destinations	Notes
0.000	0.000	M-13 / LHCT – Pinconning, Standish, Bay City	
3.036	4.886	Bay City Recreation Area entrance	
1.000 mi = 1.609 km; 1.000 km = 0.621 mi
