= Little Point, Indiana =

- Unincorporated community
- Location within Indiana Location within the United States
- Coordinates: 39°33′54″N 86°37′55″W
- Country: United States
- State: Indiana
- County: Morgan
- Township: Adams
- Elevation: 774 ft (236 m)
- Time zone: UTC-5 (Eastern (EST))
  - Summer (DST): UTC-4 (EDT)
- ZIP code: 46180
- FIPS code: 18-44334
- GNIS feature ID: 449686

Little Point is an unincorporated community in Adams Township, Morgan County, in the U.S. state of Indiana.

== History ==
A post office was established at Little Point in 1876, and remained in operation until it was discontinued in 1908.
