= Adams Township, Morgan County, Indiana =

Township in Indiana, United States

Adams Township
- Township
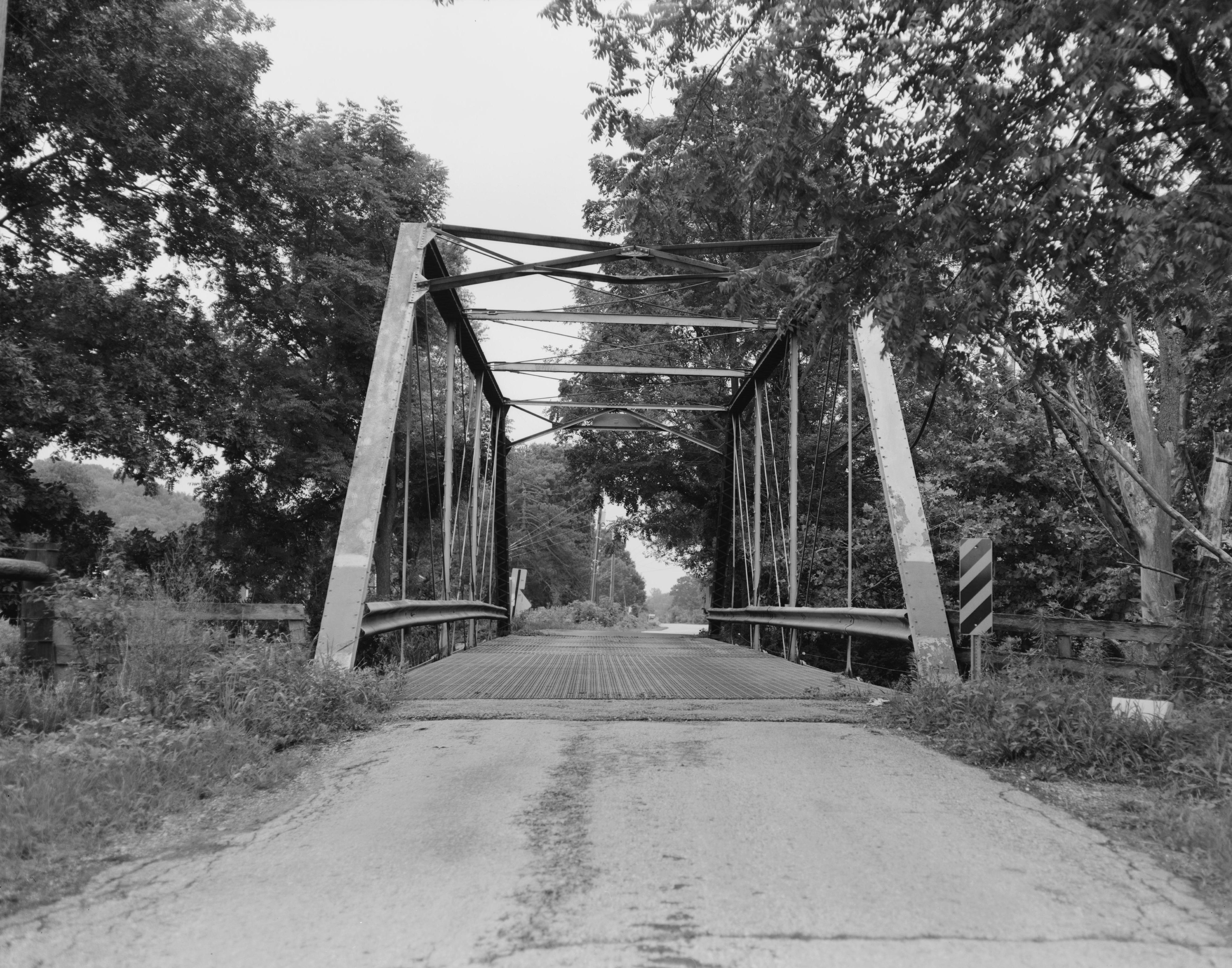
- Lamb's Creek Bridge, a historic landmark in Adams Township

- Location in Morgan County
- Coordinates: 39°33′34″N 86°37′13″W
- Country: United States
- State: Indiana
- County: Morgan

Government
  - Type: Indiana township

Area
  - Total: 29.82 sq mi (77.2 km^{2})
  - Land: 29.81 sq mi (77.2 km^{2})
  - Water: 0.02 sq mi (0.052 km^{2}) 0.07%
- Elevation: 748 ft (228 m)

Population (2020)
  - Total: 1,225
  - Density: 40.1/sq mi (15.5/km^{2})
- Time zone: UTC-5 (Eastern (EST))
  - Summer (DST): UTC-4 (EDT)
- ZIP codes: 46125, 46151, 46157, 46180
- GNIS feature ID: 453079

Adams Township is one of fourteen townships in Morgan County, Indiana, United States. As of the 2010 census, its population was 1,194 and it contained 502 housing units.

== Geography ==
According to the 2010 census, the township has a total area of 29.82 square miles (77.2 km^{2}), of which 29.81 square miles (77.2 km^{2}) (or 99.97%) is land and 0.02 square miles (0.052 km^{2}) (or 0.07%) is water.

=== Unincorporated towns ===
- Crown Center at 39.579491°N 86.589723°W
- Eminence at 39.521436°N 86.641391°W
- Little Point at 39.565047°N 86.631947°W

=== Cemeteries ===
The township contains these four cemeteries: Crown Center, Shumaker, Walters and Whitaker-Patrick.

=== Major highways ===
- Interstate 70

== School districts ==
- Eminence Community School Corporation

== Political districts ==
- Indiana's 4th congressional district
- State House District 47
- State Senate District 37
