= Wilbur School =

- U.S. National Register of Historic Places
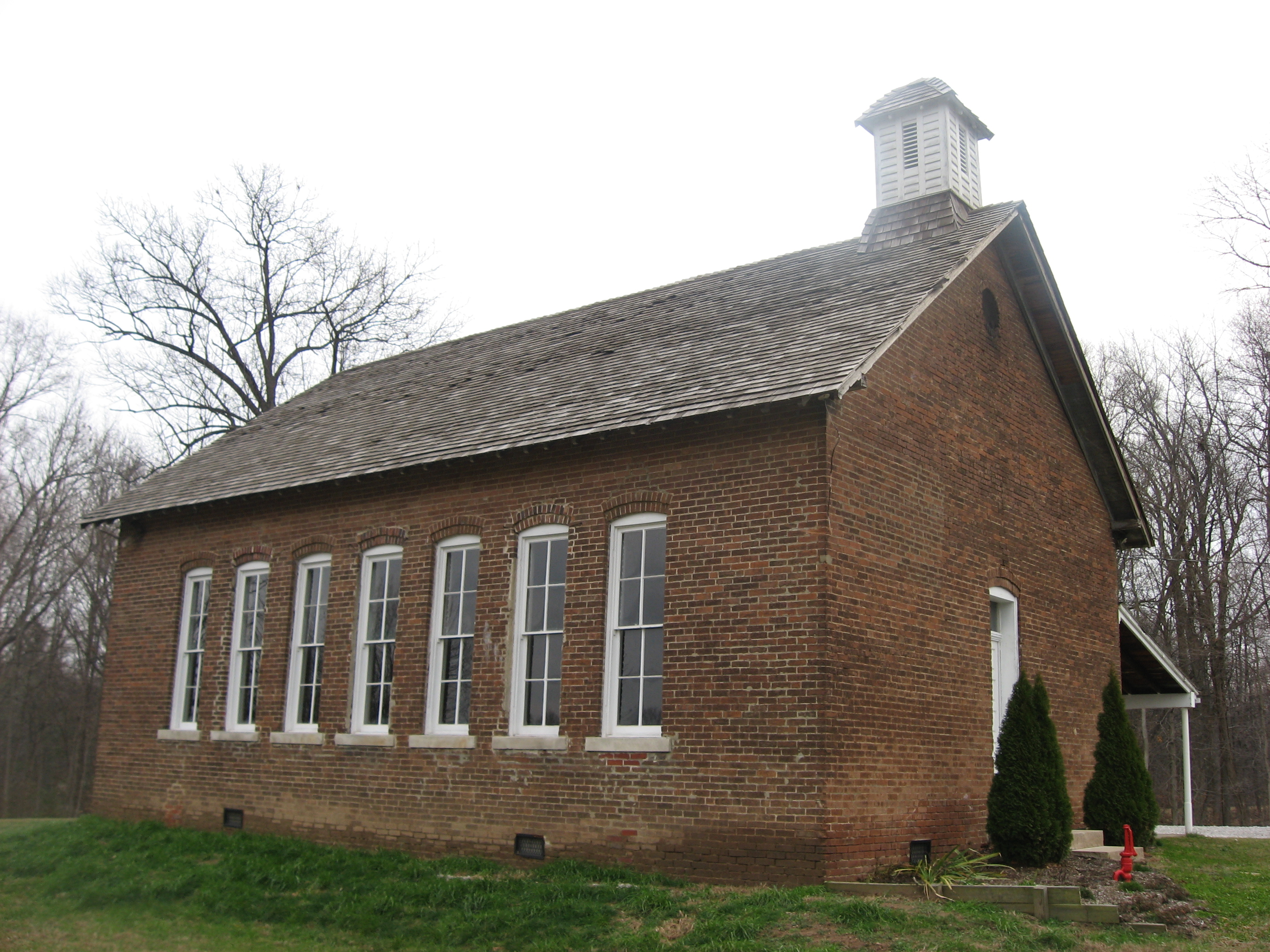
- Wilbur School, December 2011

- Location within Indiana Location within the United States
- Location: Wilbur Rd., Wilbur, Indiana
- Coordinates: 39°30′50″N 86°29′19″W
- Area: less than one acre
- Built: c. 1876
- Architectural style: Italianate
- NRHP reference No.: 93000473
- Added to NRHP: May 27, 1993

Wilbur School, also known as Wilbur Community Center, is a historic one-room school building located in Gregg Township, Morgan County, Indiana. It was built about 1876, and is a one-story, gable front, brick building with Italianate style design elements. It features double coursed segmental arched window openings. A concrete block addition was constructed when the building was converted for use as a community centre.

It was listed on the National Register of Historic Places in 1993.
