= Wilbur, Indiana =

- Unincorporated community
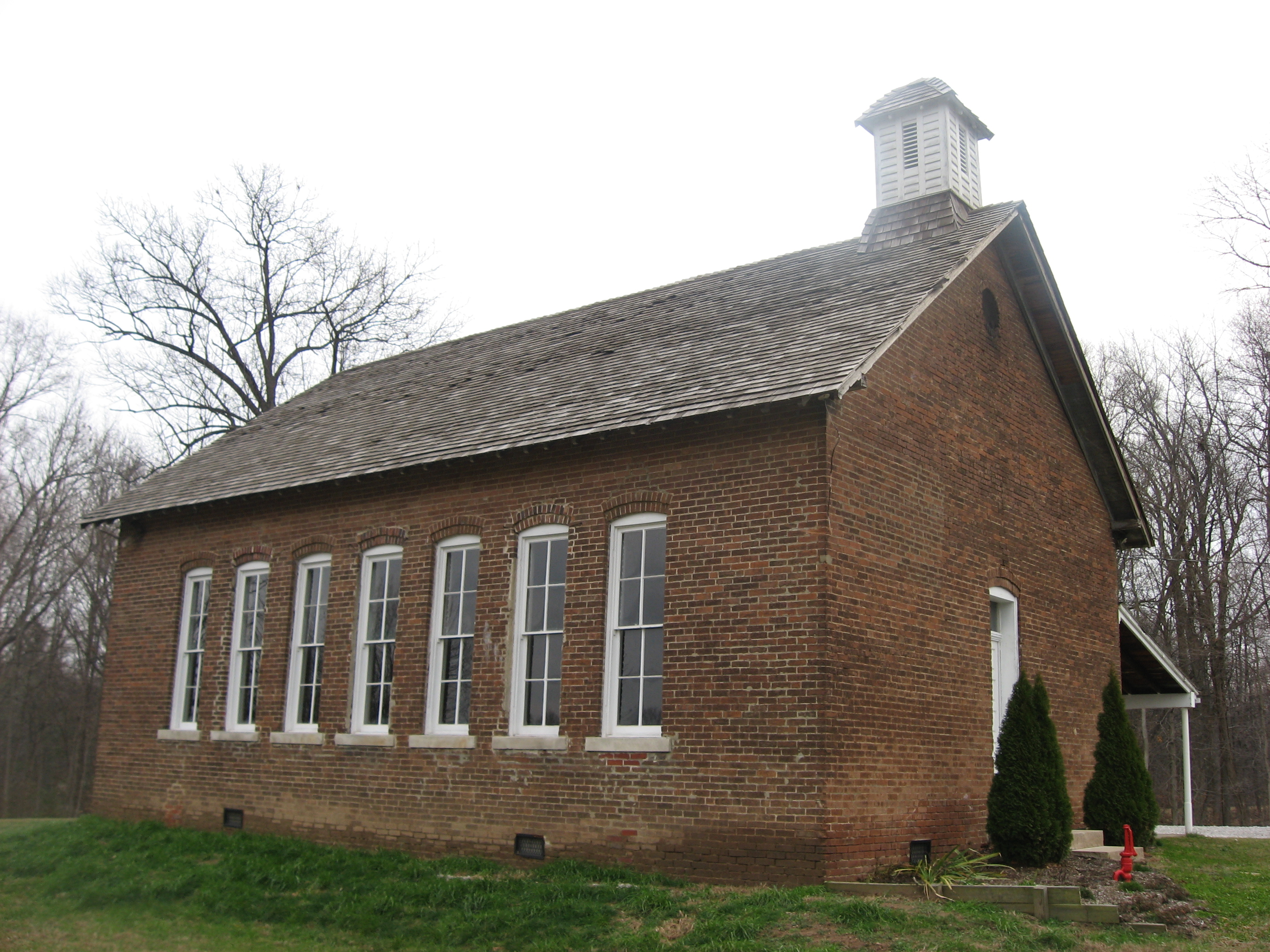
- Wilbur's old schoolhouse

- Location within Indiana Location within the United States
- Coordinates: 39°30′58″N 86°29′19″W
- Country: United States
- State: Indiana
- County: Morgan
- Township: Gregg
- Elevation: 853 ft (260 m)
- Time zone: UTC-5 (Eastern (EST))
  - Summer (DST): UTC-4 (EDT)
- ZIP code: 46157
- FIPS code: 18-84176
- GNIS feature ID: 446010

Wilbur is an unincorporated community in Gregg Township, Morgan County, in the U.S. state of Indiana.

== History ==
Wilbur was founded in the 1830s. A post office was established at Wilbur in 1873, and remained in operation until it was discontinued in 1906.

The Wilbur School was listed on the National Register of Historic Places in 1993.
