= Eminence Junior & Senior High School =

Location
- 105 6760 North SR 42; Eminence, Indiana 46125; United States
- 39.524261°N 86.641821°W

Information
- Type: Public high school
- Superintendent: Jeff Bond
- Principal: Carlotta Cooprider
- Faculty: 17 (FTE)
- Grades: 6-12
- Enrollment: 159 (2023-24)
- Color
- Athletics conference: Independent
- Team name: Eels
- Website: www.eminence.k12.in.us/o/jshs

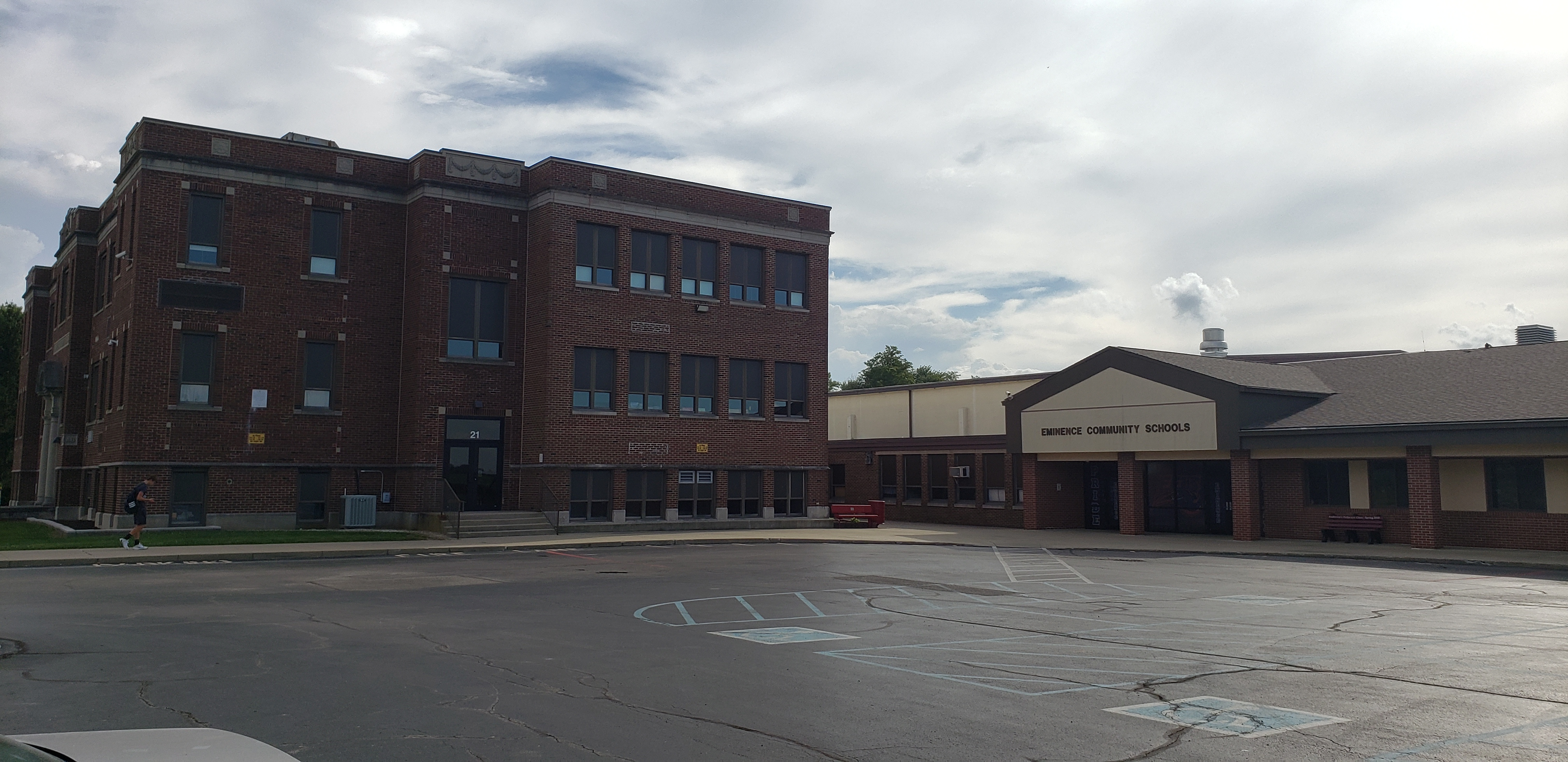
Eminence Jr. Sr. High School in Indiana

Eminence Junior & Senior High School is a public high school located in Eminence, Indiana, United States. It serves grades 6–12. More than 95 percent of the student body was white in 2023.

Eels are the school mascot and the school colors are red white and blue. The school has played the Warriors of Eminence High School in Eminence, Kentucky.

== See also ==
- List of high schools in Indiana
