= Bay City State Park =

State park in Michigan, United States

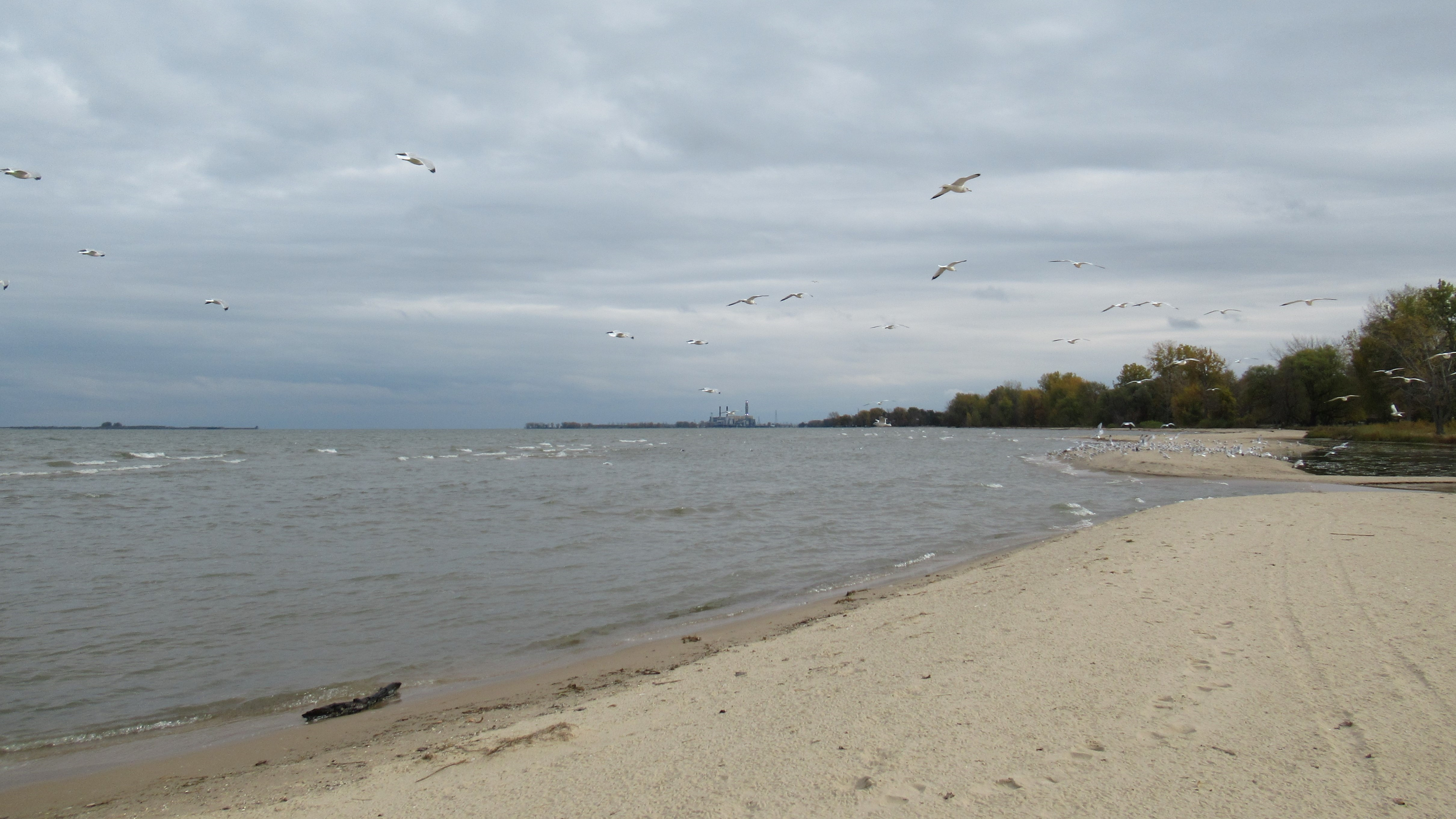
- Beachfront along Saginaw Bay

- Location within Michigan Location within the United States
- Interactive map of Bay City State Park
- Location: Bay County, Michigan, United States
- Nearest city: Bay City, Michigan
- Coordinates: 43°39′58″N 83°54′19″W
- Area: 2,389 acres (967 ha)
- Elevation: 584 feet (178 m)
- Established: 1922
- Administrator: Michigan Department of Natural Resources
- Website: Official website

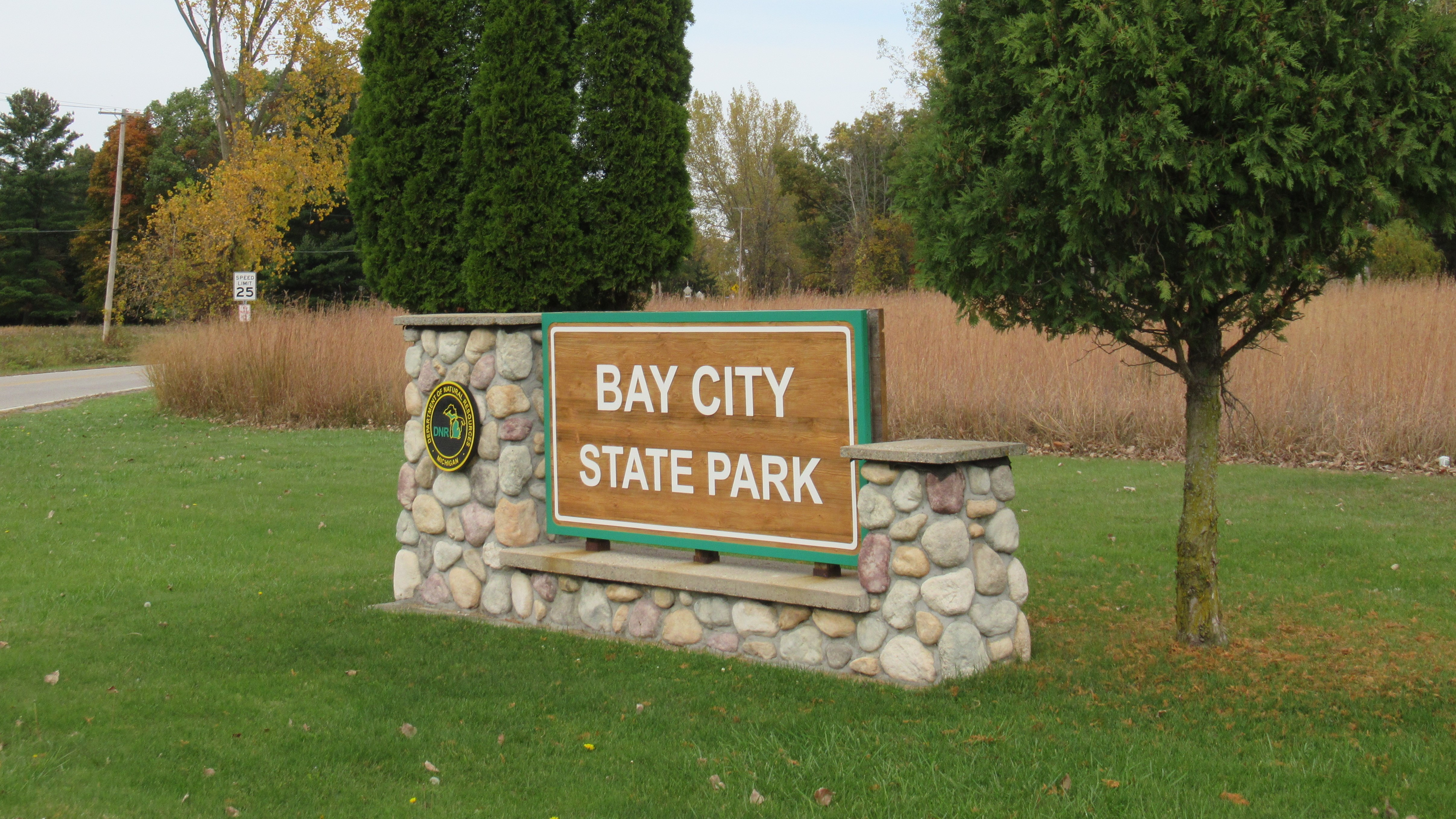
Park entrance along East Beaver Road and M-247

Bay City State Park (previously Bay City State Recreation Area) is a 2,389-acre (967 ha) state park located on the shore of Saginaw Bay near Bay City in Bay County, Michigan, United States. The Tobico Marsh, one of the largest remaining freshwater, coastal wetlands on the Great Lakes is located in the park. The park is a haven for migratory birds and wetland wildlife. Other natural features of the park include a mile of sandy beach, over 2,000 acres (810 ha) of wetland woods, meadows, oak savannah prairies, and cattail marshes.

== History ==
The park saw its inception in 1922, when the Michigan Conservation Commission accepted from Bay City a tract of land on the shore of Saginaw Bay with the proviso that the site become a state park. From 1923 until 1994, it was known as Bay City State Park. In 1994, when some 1,900 acres (770 ha) termed the Tobico Marsh were added to the park, the park took on the name of Bay City State Recreation Area, a move that confused both the populace and the media who continued to refer to by its original name. The name Bay City State Park was restored in 2017.

== Activities and amenities ==
The park offers swimming, spray park, trails for hiking, biking and cross-country skiing, picnicking areas, playground, and camping. Park activities include fishing, hunting and trapping as well as wildlife viewing from observation towers, boardwalks, viewing platforms, and shoreline spotting scopes. The park's 10,000-square-foot (930 m^{2}) Saginaw Bay Visitor Center includes an exhibit hall with interactive natural history displays, 100-seat auditorium, and year-round environmental education programs.

== Beach pollution ==
Pollution on the beaches bordering the Saginaw Bay consisting of organic matter has been a significant issue to park patrons and local waterfront land owners in recent years. Although beach grooming has been implemented to clean up the beaches, a large part of the shoreline along the bay is muddied with muck.

Much of the pollution found along the bay shore has been attributed to waste runoff from local farms settled within the Saginaw River watershed, wastewater treatment failures, and leaking septic systems, which contribute nutrients into the water, causing algae blooms.
