= Tobico Marsh =

Marsh in Bay County, Michigan, United States

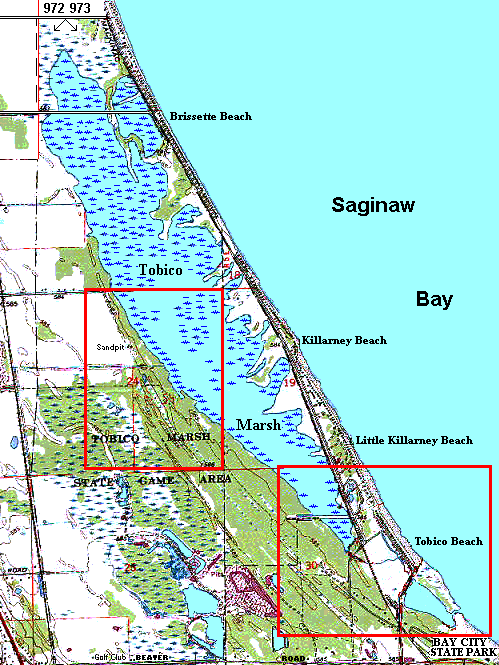
- Map of the Tobico Marsh

- Location within Michigan Location within the United States
- Location: Bay County, Michigan, US
- Nearest city: Bay City
- Coordinates: 43°41′51″N 83°56′11″W
- Area: 1,652 acres (6.69 km^{2})
- Established: 1957
- Governing body: Michigan Department of Natural Resources

U.S. National Natural Landmark
- Designated: 1976

Tobico Marsh, located just north of Bay City, Michigan, is part of the Bay City Recreation Area. Tobico Marsh was designated as a registered National Natural Landmark in 1976 because of its large size, relatively undisturbed condition and variety of aquatic plant life. With nearly 2,000 acres (8.1 km^{2}) of wetland woods, wet meadows, cattail marshlands and oak savannah prairies, Tobico Marsh is one of the largest remaining freshwater, coastal wetlands on the Great Lakes.

== Habitat ==
Comprising 1,652 acres (6.69 km^{2}), the marsh contains three distinct habitats: a wide expanse of open water, an extensive area of marshland, and a mixed hardwood forest.

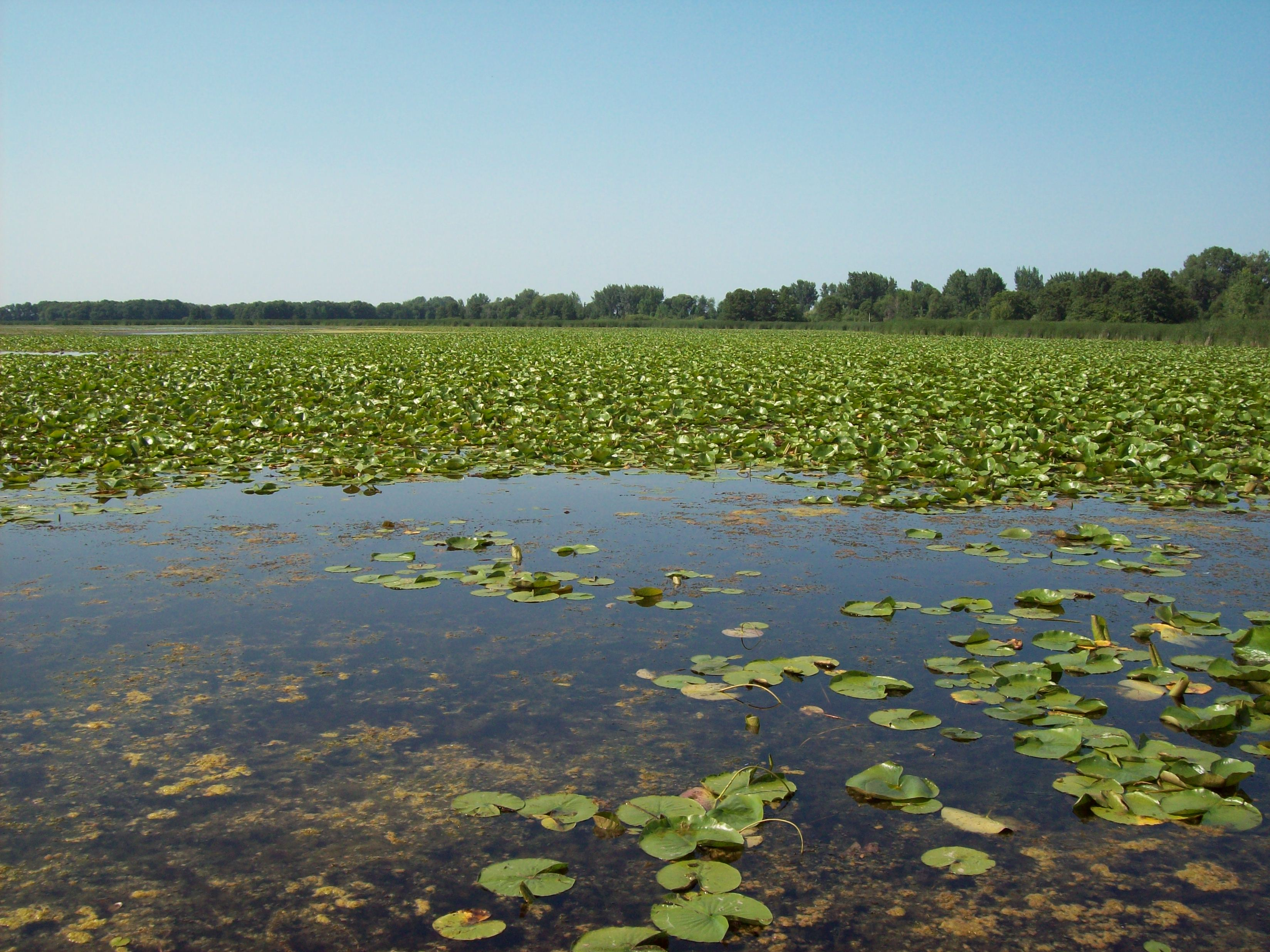

== History ==
The first private ownership of Tobico Marsh was by logging interests. As logging diminished, the land was sold to several individuals who formed the Tobico Hunting and Fishing Club. In 1956, Guy Garber and Frank Andersen, the only surviving members, realized the value of the area as a wildlife refuge. Andersen donated the property to the State of Michigan in 1957 and it became the Tobico State Wildlife Refuge. Later, the State obtained adjacent land and formed the Tobico Marsh State Game Area, with the wildlife refuge as its core. In 1995, the refuge and game area were merged with the adjacent Bay City State Park, forming the Bay City State Recreation Area.
