= Crown Center, Indiana =

- Unincorporated community
- Location within Indiana Location within the United States
- Coordinates: 39°34′46″N 86°35′23″W
- Country: United States
- State: Indiana
- County: Morgan
- Township: Adams
- Elevation: 787 ft (240 m)
- Time zone: UTC-5 (Eastern (EST))
  - Summer (DST): UTC-4 (EDT)
- ZIP code: 46180
- FIPS code: 18-16102
- GNIS feature ID: 433205

Crown Center is an unincorporated community in Adams Township, Morgan County, in the U.S. state of Indiana.

== History ==
Crown Center was originally called Mount Tabor when it was founded. A post office was established at Crown Center in 1891, and remained in operation until 1905.
