= Gregg Township, Morgan County, Indiana =

Gregg Township
- Township
- Location in Morgan County
- Coordinates: 39°31′43″N 86°31′28″W
- Country: United States
- State: Indiana
- County: Morgan

Government
  - Type: Indiana township

Area
  - Total: 25.62 sq mi (66.4 km^{2})
  - Land: 25.43 sq mi (65.9 km^{2})
  - Water: 0.19 sq mi (0.49 km^{2}) 0.74%
- Elevation: 735 ft (224 m)

Population (2020)
  - Total: 2,949
  - Density: 115.2/sq mi (44.5/km^{2})
- Time zone: UTC-5 (Eastern (EST))
  - Summer (DST): UTC-4 (EDT)
- ZIP codes: 46151, 46157
- GNIS feature ID: 453357

Gregg Township is one of fourteen townships in Morgan County, Indiana, United States. As of the 2010 census, its population was 2,930 and it contained 1,161 housing units.

== History ==
The Hall School and Wilbur School are listed on the National Register of Historic Places.

== Geography ==
According to the 2010 census, the township has a total area of 25.62 square miles (66.4 km^{2}), of which 25.43 square miles (65.9 km^{2}) (or 99.26%) is land and 0.19 square miles (0.49 km^{2}) (or 0.74%) is water.

=== Unincorporated towns ===
- Hall at 39.550047°N 86.535832°W
- Mount Zion Corner at 39.521158°N 86.564166°W
- Wilbur at 39.516158°N 86.488608°W

(This list is based on USGS data and may include former settlements.)

=== Cemeteries ===
The township contains these three marked cemeteries: Highland, Mount Pleasant and Mount Zion.

=== Lakes ===
- Whippoorwill Lake
- Briarwood Lake

== School districts ==
- Monroe-Gregg School District

== Political districts ==
- Indiana's 4th congressional district
- State House District 47
- State Senate District 37
