= Ruth Hinshaw Spray =

American peace activist (1848–1929)

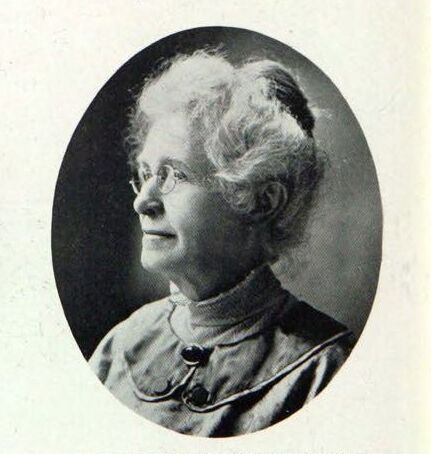
- Born: Ruth Hinshaw; February 16, 1848; Mooresville, Indiana, U.S.
- Died: February 26, 1929 (aged 81)
- Resting place: Salida, Colorado, U.S.
- Education: Simpson College; Earlham College
- Occupations: active in the work of child labor organizations and in the international peace cause
- Employer: Penn College
- Spouse: Samuel J. Spray (m. 1880)
- Children: 1

Ruth Hinshaw Spray (February 16, 1848 – February 26, 1929) was an American peace activist. Spray was prominent as a teacher in the public schools and work for the protection of children and animals. She was also active in the work of child labor organizations and in the international peace cause, Woman's Christian Temperance Union (WCTU), Retail Clerks' Association, and other associations for public welfare.

== Early life and education ==
Ruth Hinshaw was born in Mooresville, Indiana, February 16, 1848. Her parents were Benjamin and Nancy (Carter) Hinshaw.

She was educated in the public schools at Indianola, Iowa, and as student there in Simpson College. She graduated from Earlham College, Richmond, Indiana (B.S., 1874).

== Career ==
Spray served as a preceptress and teacher at the Raisin Valley Seminary, Adrian, Michigan, from 1874 to 1877. She then taught history and English in Penn College, Oskaloosa, Iowa, from 1877 until 1880. She was an Officer of Colorado State Bureau of Child and Animal Protection.

She was actively engaged in the work for international peace. She was a member of the Universal Peace Union, and she served as vice-president of the American Peace Society for 16 years. She was also State superintendent of Peace and Arbitration for the Colorado WCTU, and district president of the 12th Colorado District WCTU. Spray was a delegate to the International Peace Congress, held in Boston, 1904. She worked continuously for international peace, getting hundreds of petitions before the U.S. Congress and other petitions sent to U.S. delegates to each of the two Hague Conferences and by wide distribution of peace literature. Since 1902, Spray worked to get the teachers of Colorado to take up the subject of international peace, and many schools of Colorado were thus induced to teach the subject and to observe May 18 as International Peace Day.

After Spray became a resident of Salida, Colorado, she served as president of the Tuesday Evening Club. During those years, the club built the Salida Public Library, with Spray leading that movement. She was a member of the Colorado Woman Suffrage Association, the Society of Friends, and the Board of Trustees of the Salida Public Library. Since 1900, she was an officer of the Colorado State Bureau of Child and Animal Protection, working with marked results in the interest of neglected and abused children.

== Personal life ==
In Indianola, Iowa, on December 28, 1880, she married Samuel J. Spray, of Indianapolis, Indiana. They had one daughter, Mrs. Mary E. Spray Moon, Baltimore, Maryland.

In politics, she was Independent.

Ruth Hinshaw Spray died February 26, 1929, and was buried in Detroit, Michigan.

Her papers are held by Earlham College.
