= Flag and Seal of Mooresville, Indiana =

American municipal symbols

Mooresville, Indiana

Seal of Mooresville
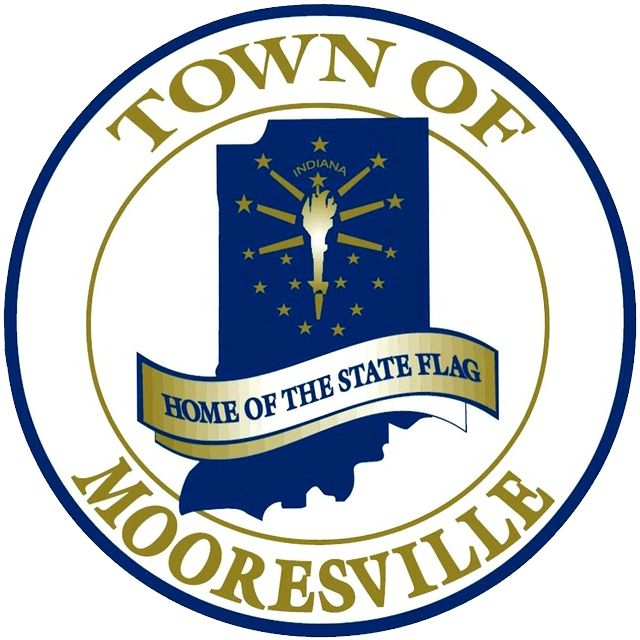
- Armiger: Town of Mooresville
- Adopted: No later than 2011
- Motto: "Home of the State Flag"

The flag of Mooresville, Indiana, was adopted in 1974 and is the first and current flag of the town. The seal of Mooresville, Indiana is used by town officials to identify town government possessions and to certify official documents. It is the first and current seal.

== Flag of Mooresville ==
=== History ===
The official Mooresville town flag was designed by Bonita C. Marley in 1974 to celebrate the 150th anniversary of Mooresville's founding. Mrs. Marley worked as the librarian and director at the Mooresville Public Library from 1961 through 1984. In 1968, she was named "Mooresvillian of the Year."

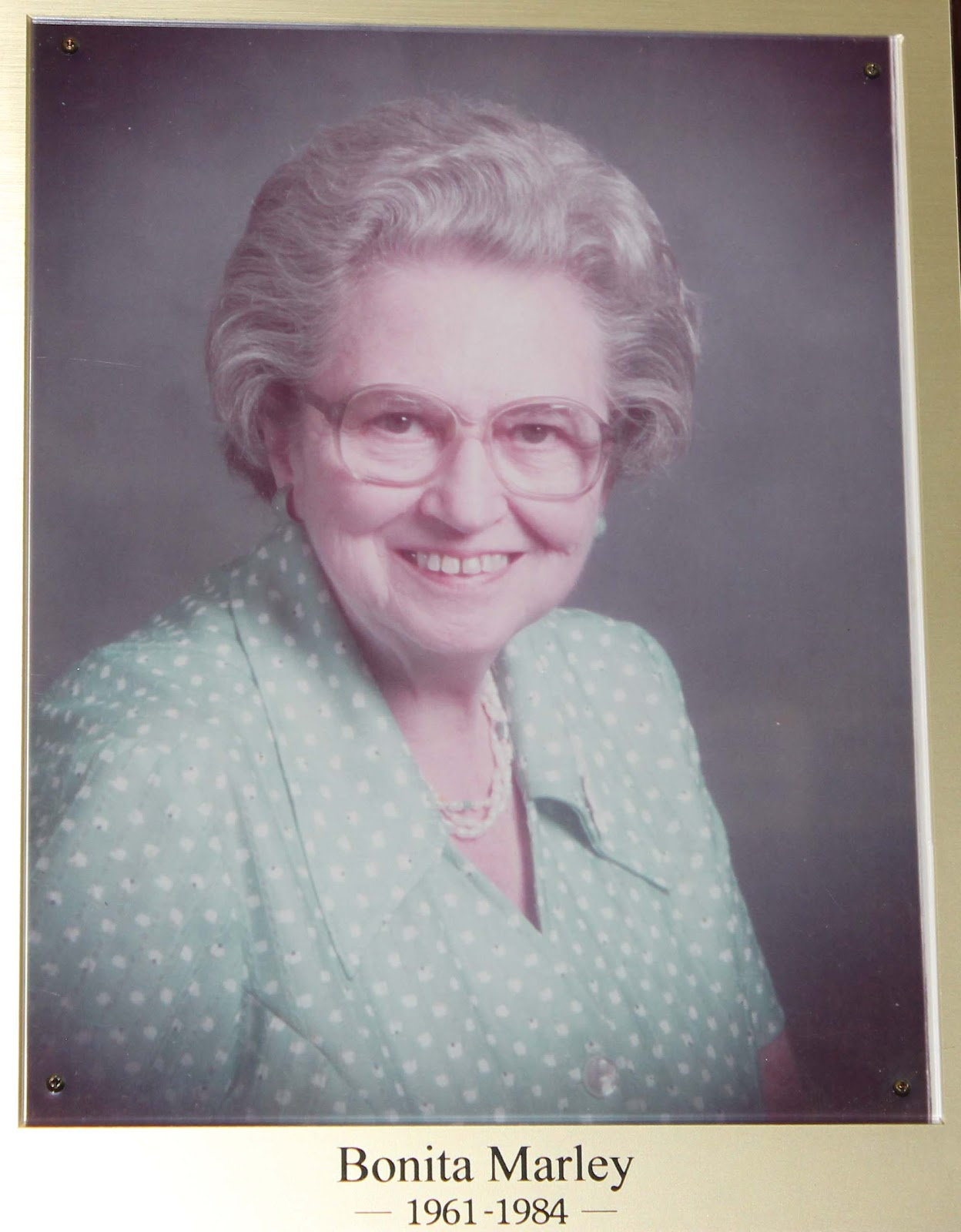
Bonita C. Marley

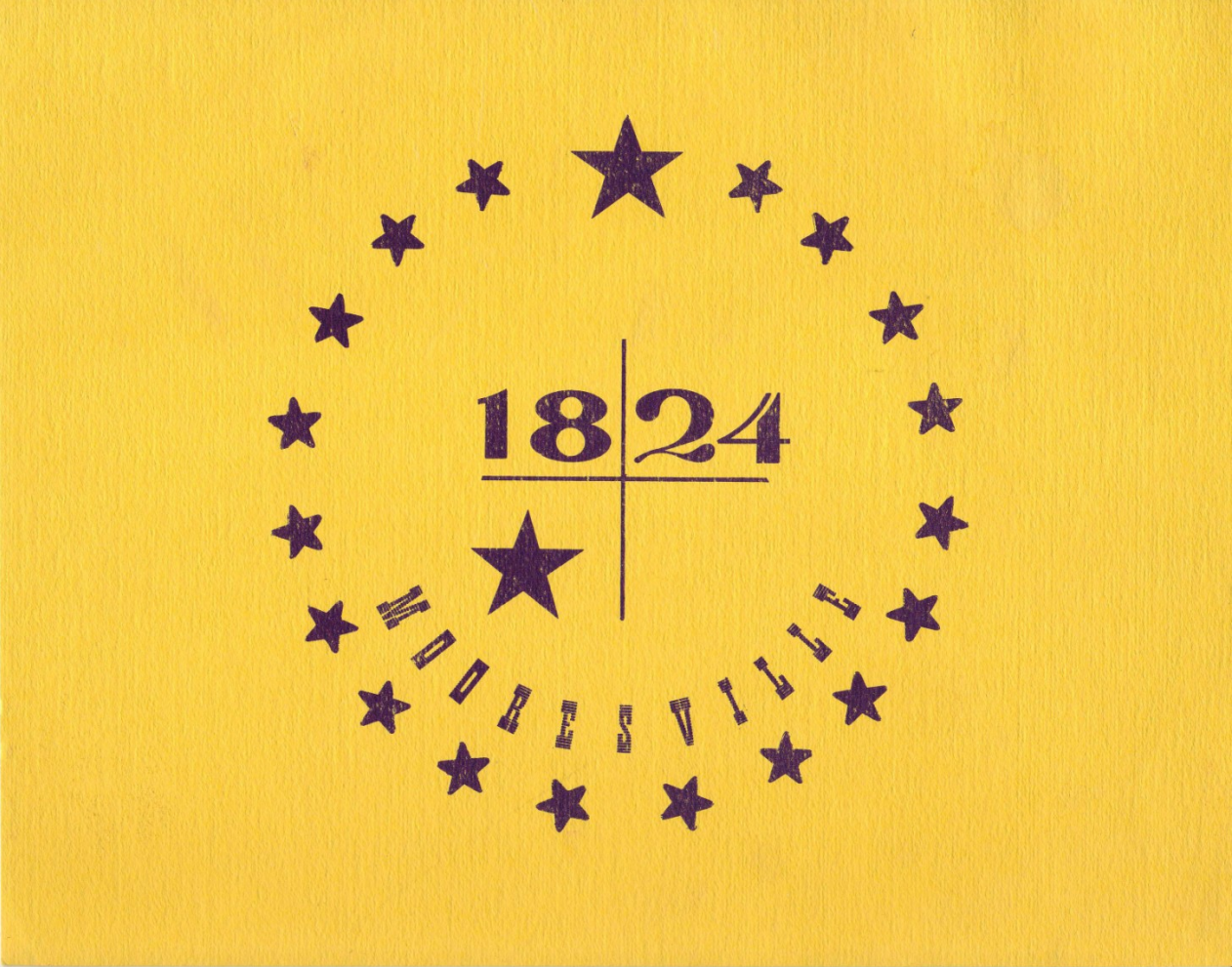
Marley's original flag design, 1974

=== Iconography ===
The flag of Mooresville was designed to look similar to the Indiana state flag, given that Mooresville is where the state flag was created. The flag consists of a gold field with a circle of 19 blue stars with the top star being the largest. In the center of the flag is a blue cross with the date "1824' in the upper half of the cross and a blue star in the lower left side of the cross. Below the cross is the name "Mooresville" in blue with the letters curving into a semi circle.

The circle of stars represents how Indiana was the 19th state of the union, with the large star representing Indiana's statehood. The cross in the center represents the state's motto, "the crossroads of America." The date refers to the year that the town of Mooresville was founded, 1824. The star on the cross represents Mooresville's position relative to Indianapolis.

=== Usage ===
The flag is used around the town, mainly by town officials. The flag is in possession of the Mooresville Public Library, the Mooresville town government, the Mooresville Consolidated School District, and each individual Mooresville school. The flag is on permanent display at Bicentennial Park, the Mooresville Public Library Indiana room, and the Mooresville Government Center.

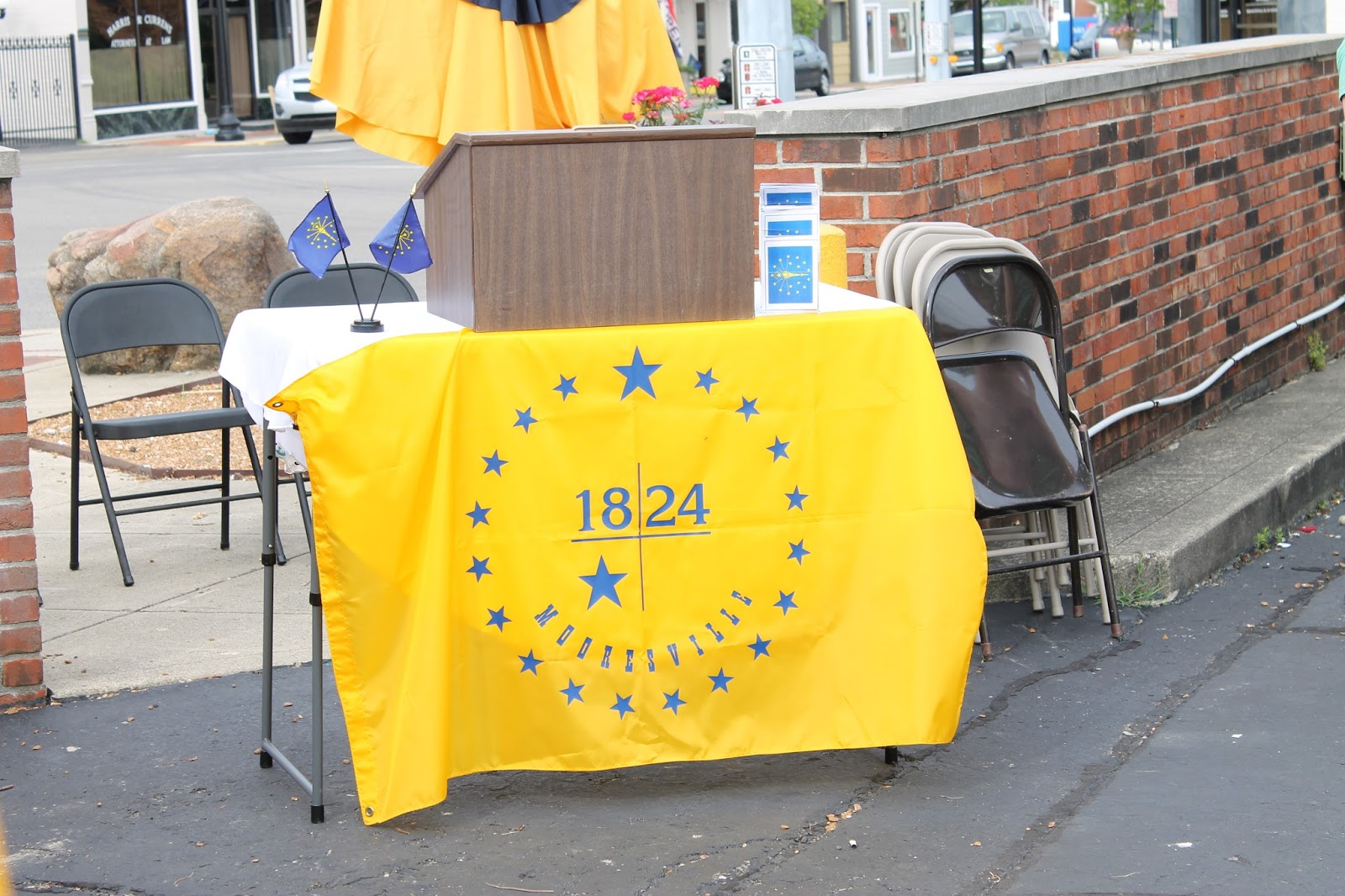
Mooresville flag presented at the opening ceremony of Bicentennial Park in downtown Mooresville.

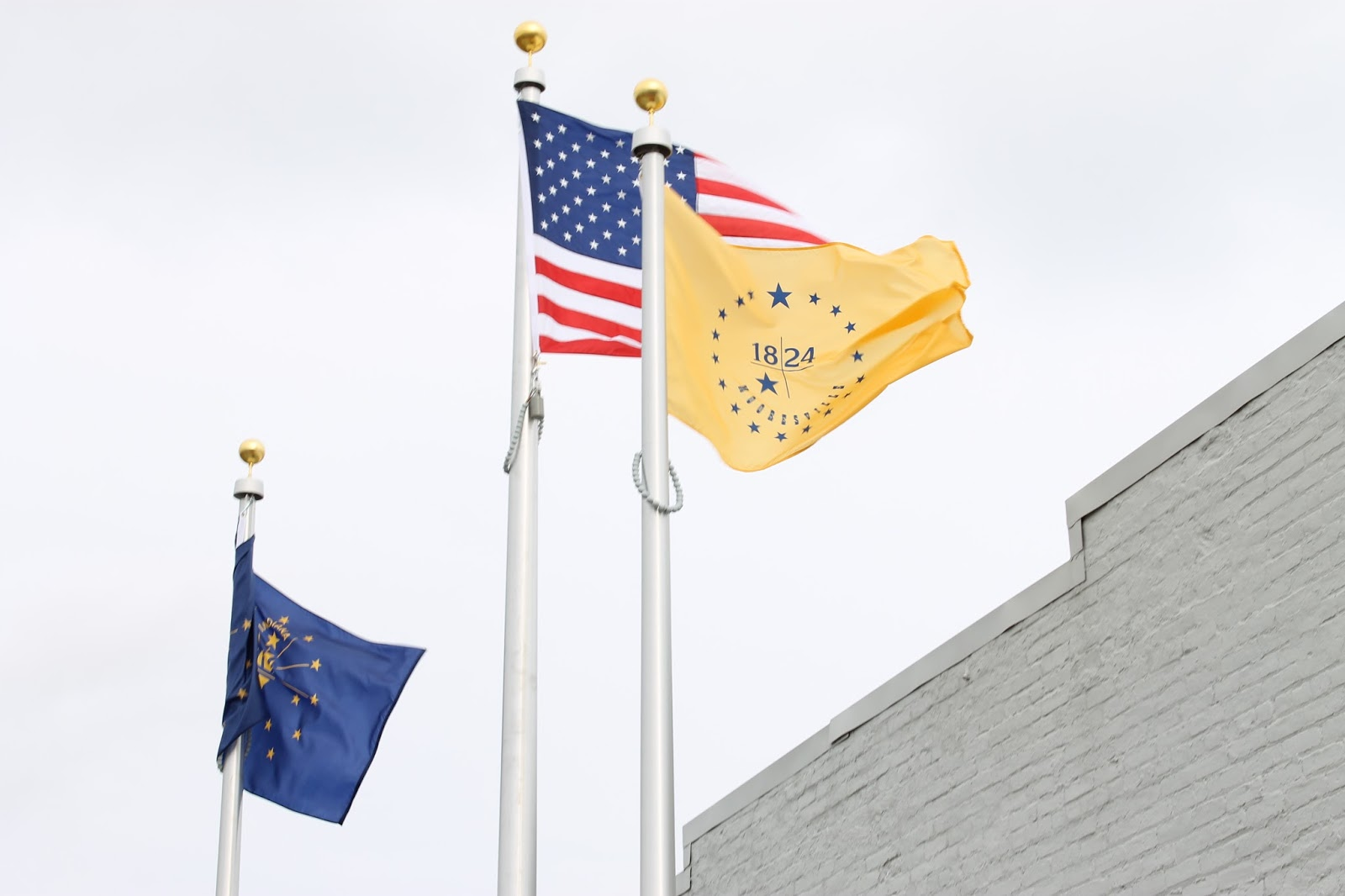
Flag display at Bicentennial Park, Mooresville.

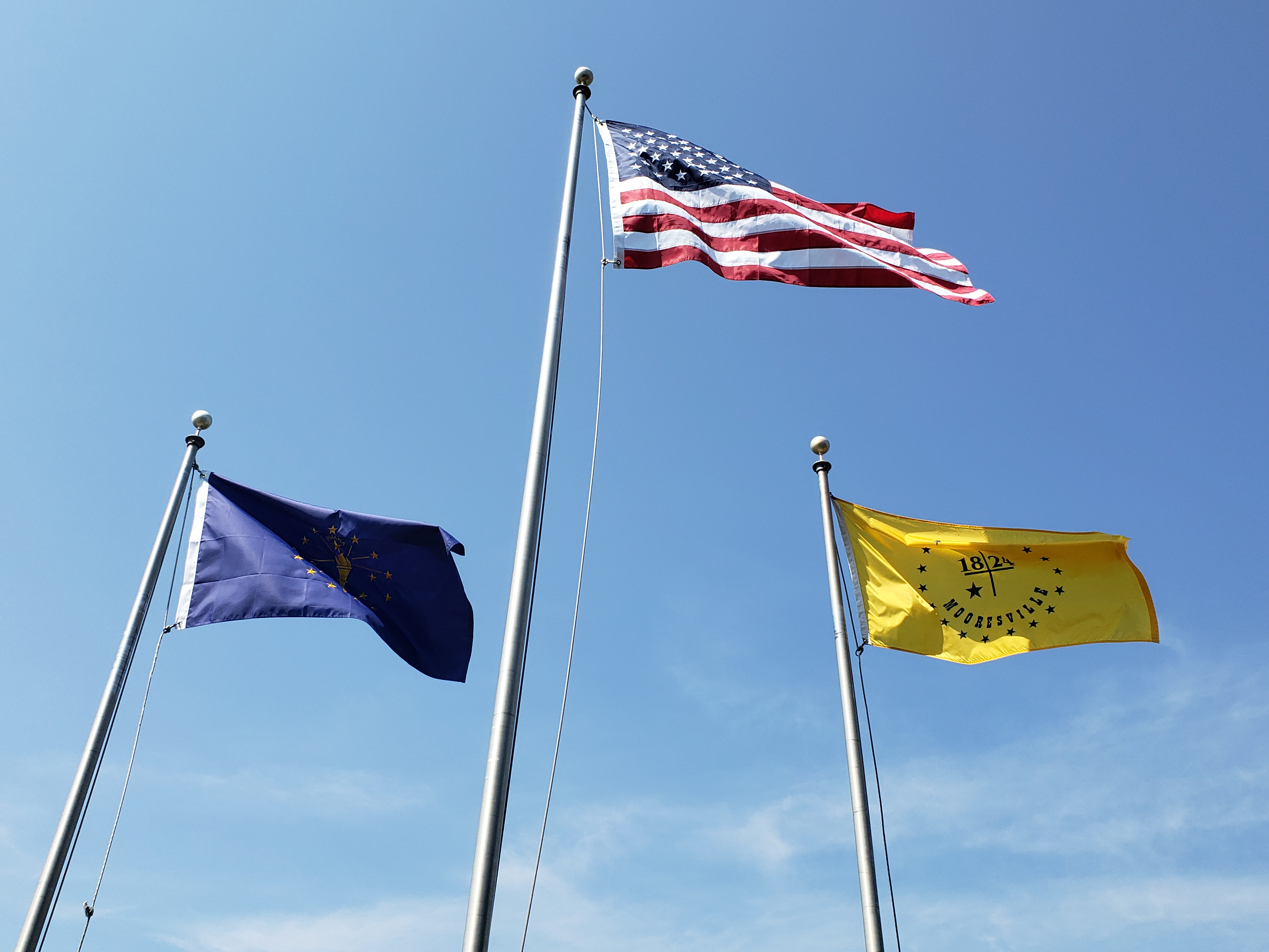
Flags flying at the Mooresville Education Center.

=== Other flags of Mooresville ===
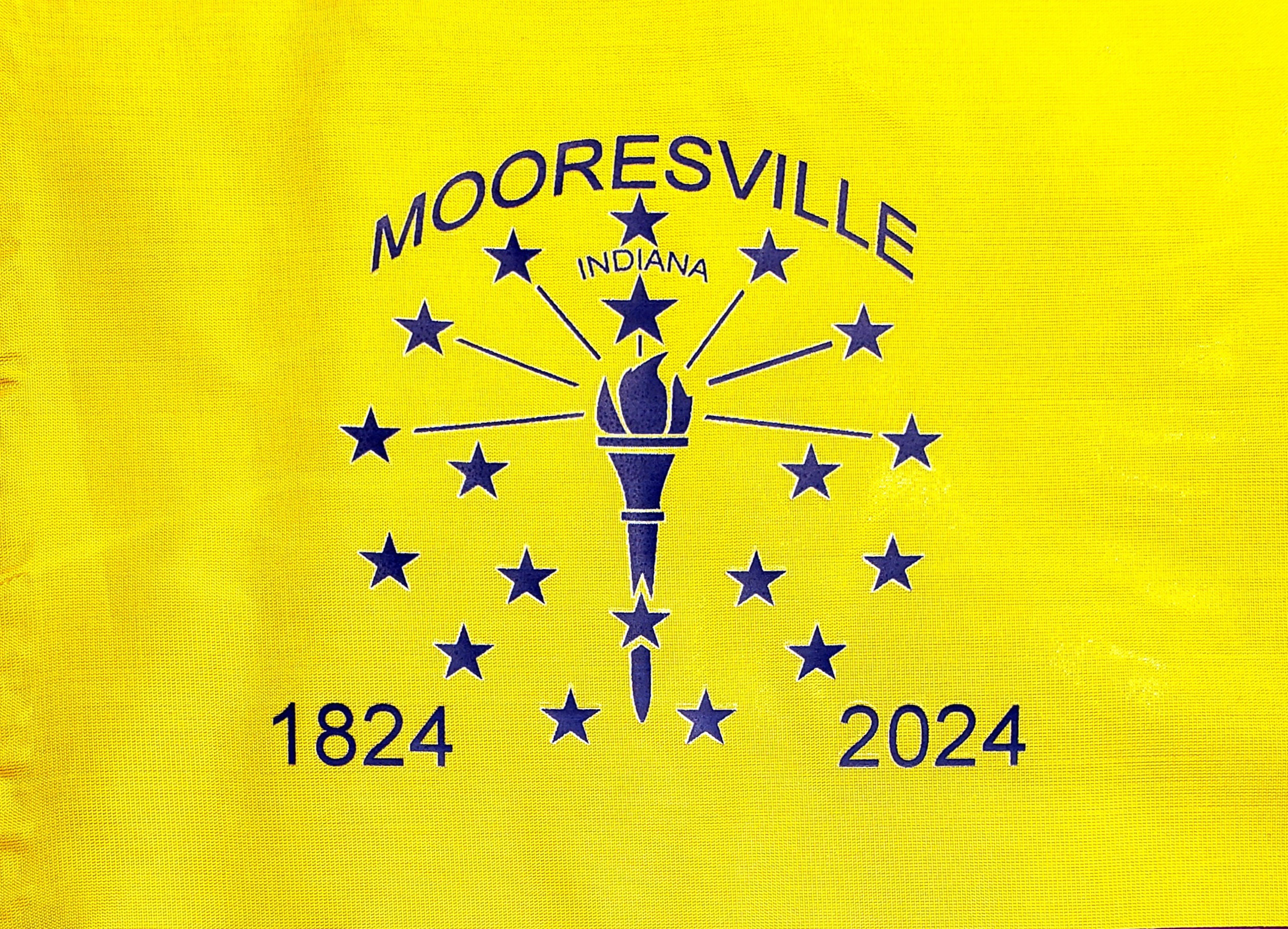
Mooresville bicentennial flag

To celebrate the town's 200th bicentennial anniversary, a bicentennial flag of Mooresville was created and sold in stores in downtown Mooresville to coincide with the Mooresville 200 event that was being held.

The Mooresville Chamber of Commerce has their own flag that consists of their seal placed upon a white flag.

The Mooresville Waverly School has its own flag. This flag uses the same colors as the Indiana state flag.

== Seal of Mooresville ==
=== Design ===
The design of the seal consists of a white disc with an outer circle of blue, an inner circle of gold, the state flag on a blue state border, a gold and white banner below the state flag that reads "HOME OF THE STATE FLAG" in blue, and the phrase "TOWN OF MOORESVILLE" in gold wrapped in-between the two circles.

=== Usage ===
The seal is used to certify official documents from the town government. The seal is also used to identify town government owned buildings, vehicles, and social media accounts.

=== Other seals of Mooresville ===
The official logo of Mooresville uses elements taken from the seal.

The Mooresville Parks and Recreations District has its own unique seal.

The Mooresville Consolidated School District and the Mooresville Chamber of Commerce both have their own seals. These seals were designed to be similar to the official seal of Mooresville.

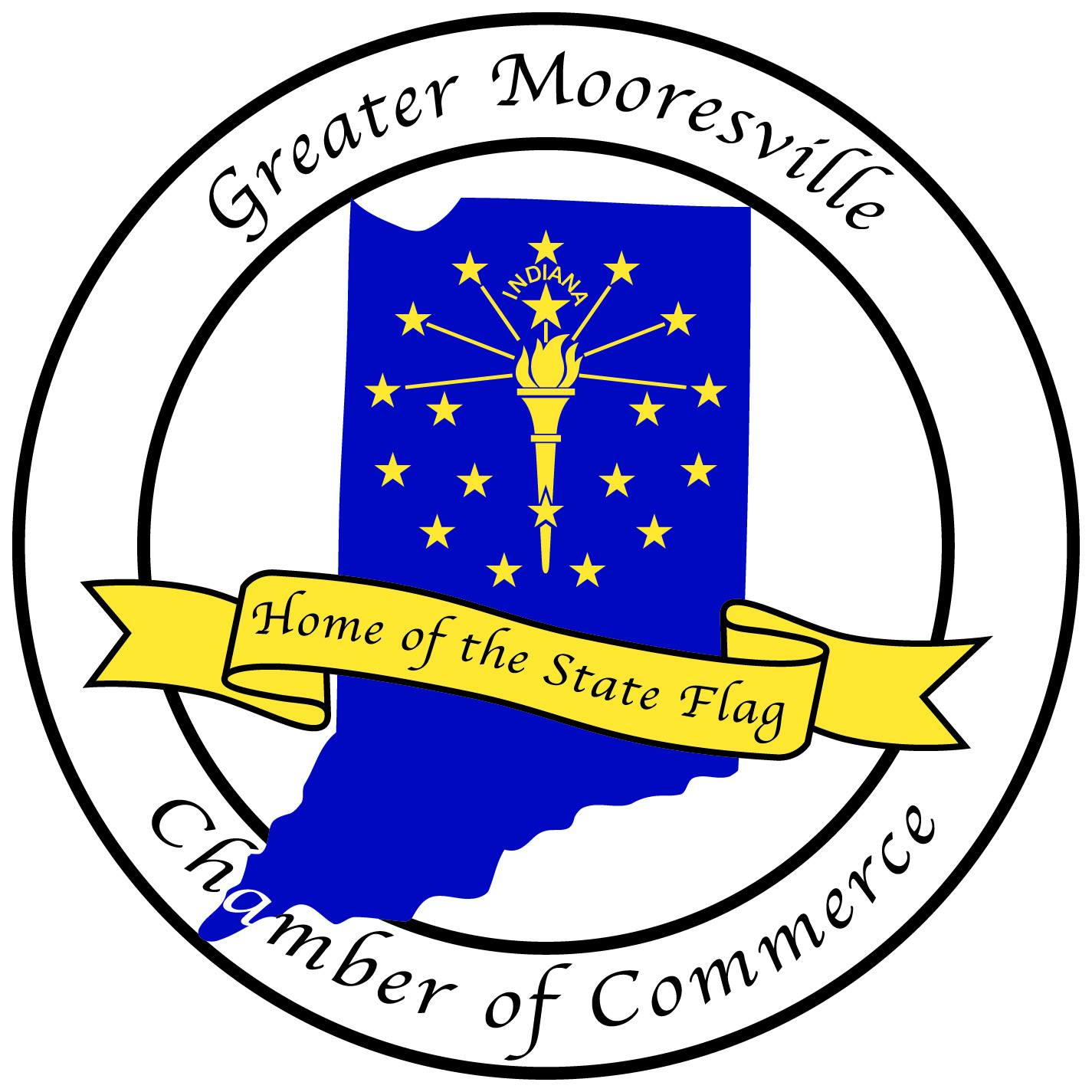
Seal of Mooresville Chamber of Commerce.

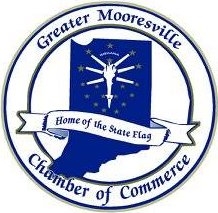
Variant of the Mooresville Chamber of Commerce seal utilizing the same torch and stars as on the Mooresville seal.

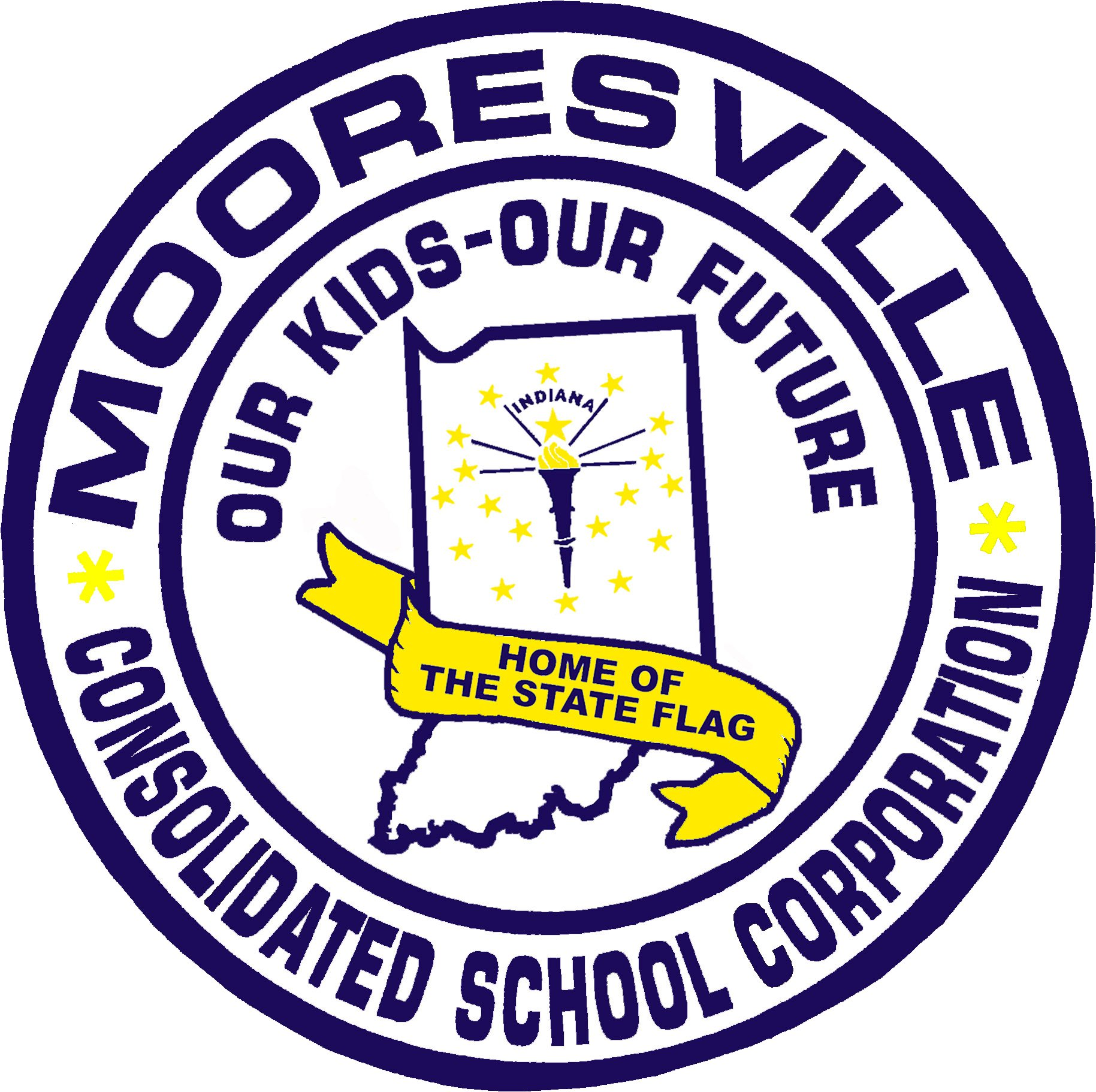
Seal of Mooresville Consolidated School District.

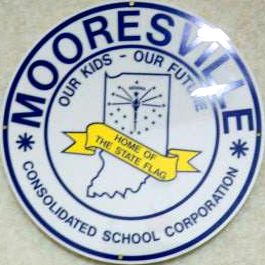
Variant of the seal of Mooresville Consolidated School District.
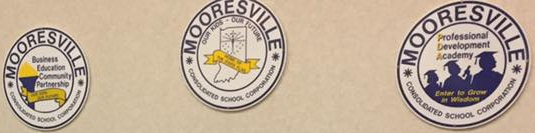
Other seals used by the Mooresville Consolidated School District.

=== Adoption of seals ===
It is not fully known when each seal was adopted. The earliest known documented use of any seal was on December 22, 2011. Each seal was likely adopted much earlier than this date.
