= Mooresville Gymnasium =

- U.S. National Register of Historic Places
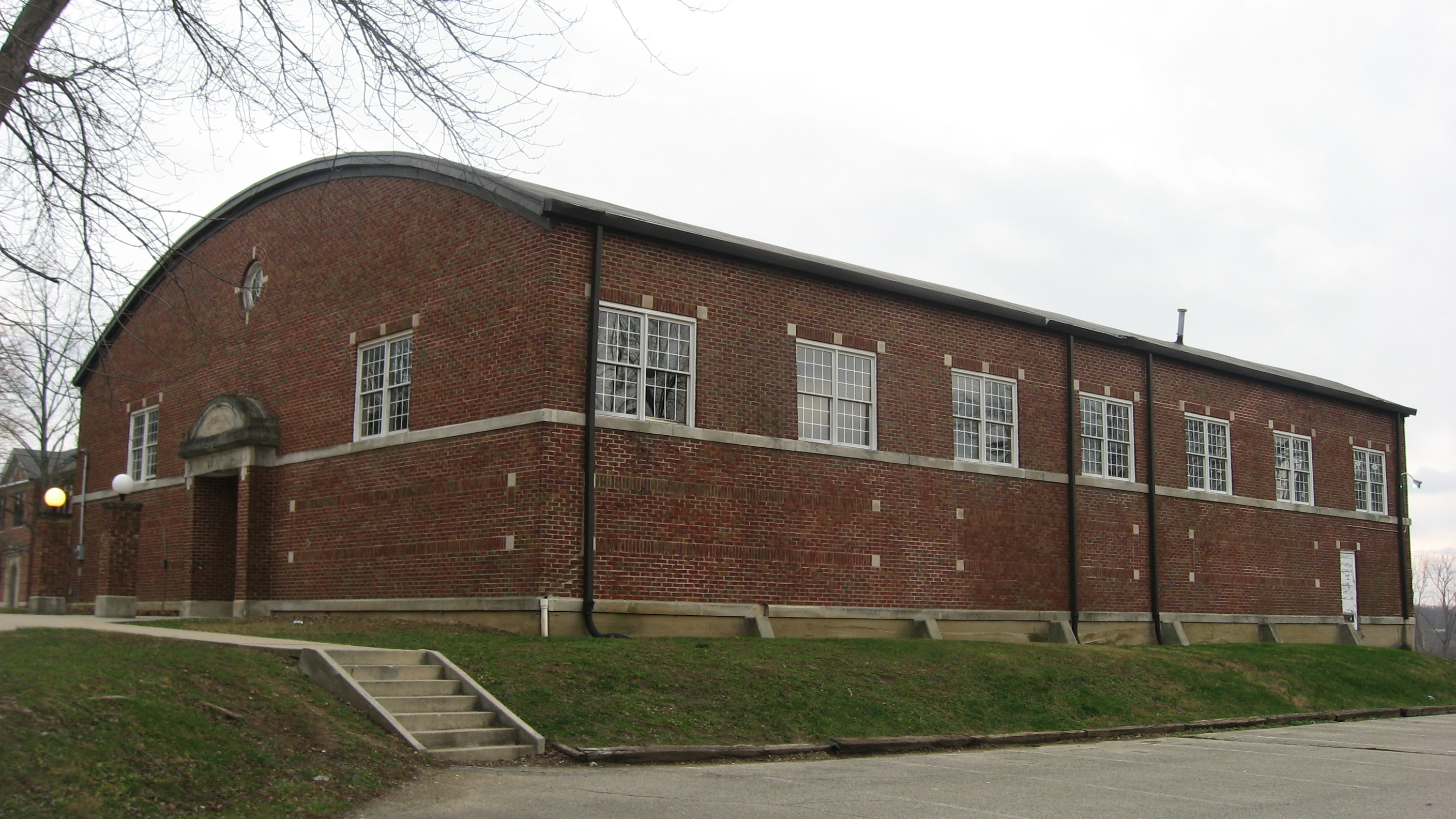
- Mooresville Gymnasium, December 2011

- Location within Indiana Location within the United States
- Location: 244 N. Monroe St., Mooresville, Indiana
- Coordinates: 39°36′56″N 86°22′53″W
- Area: less than one acre
- Built: 1921
- Architectural style: Classical Revival
- NRHP reference No.: 97000598
- Added to NRHP: June 20, 1997

Mooresville Gymnasium, also known as the Newby Dome, is a historic school gymnasium located at Mooresville, Indiana. It was built in 1921, and is a one-story, rectangular, Classical Revival style wood-frame building sheathed in "oriental brick". It measures 100 feet by 75 feet with a basketball floor of 70 feet by 45 feet.

It was listed on the National Register of Historic Places in 1997.
