= Mooresville Friends Academy Building =

- U.S. National Register of Historic Places
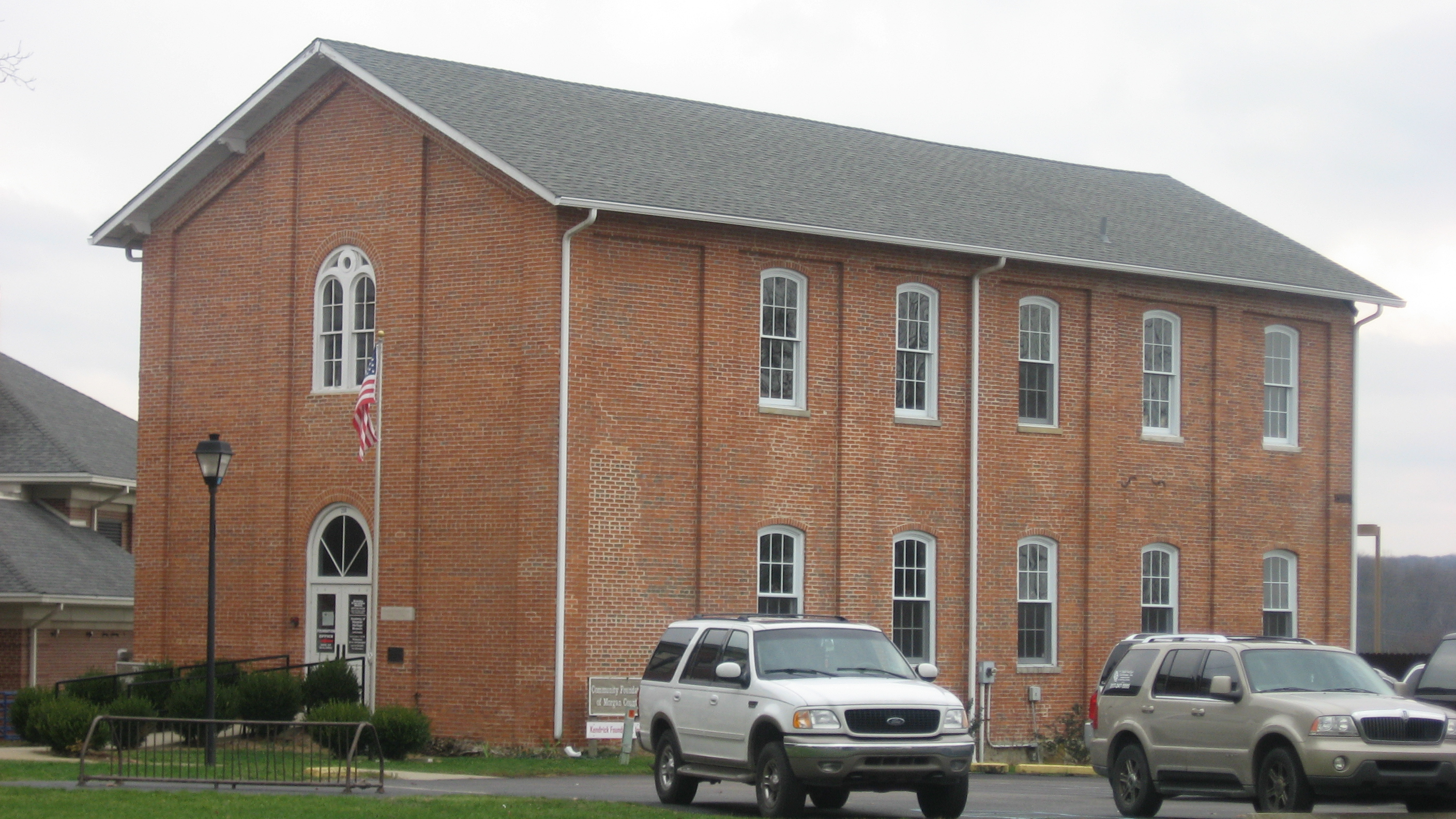
- Mooresville Friends Academy Building, December 2011

- Location within Indiana Location within the United States
- Location: 244 N. Monroe St., Mooresville, Indiana
- Coordinates: 39°36′54″N 86°22′53″W
- Area: 3 acres (1.2 ha)
- Built: 1860-1861
- Architectural style: Greek Revival
- NRHP reference No.: 75000008
- Added to NRHP: May 12, 1975

Mooresville Friends Academy Building is a historic Quaker school building located at Mooresville, Indiana. It was built in 1860–1861, and is a two-story, rectangular, Greek Revival style brick building with a low gable roof. It was built as a two-classroom school and later enlarged with an addition in 1867. It remained in use for educational purposes until 1971.

It was listed on the National Register of Historic Places in 1975.
