= Mooresville, Indiana =

- Town
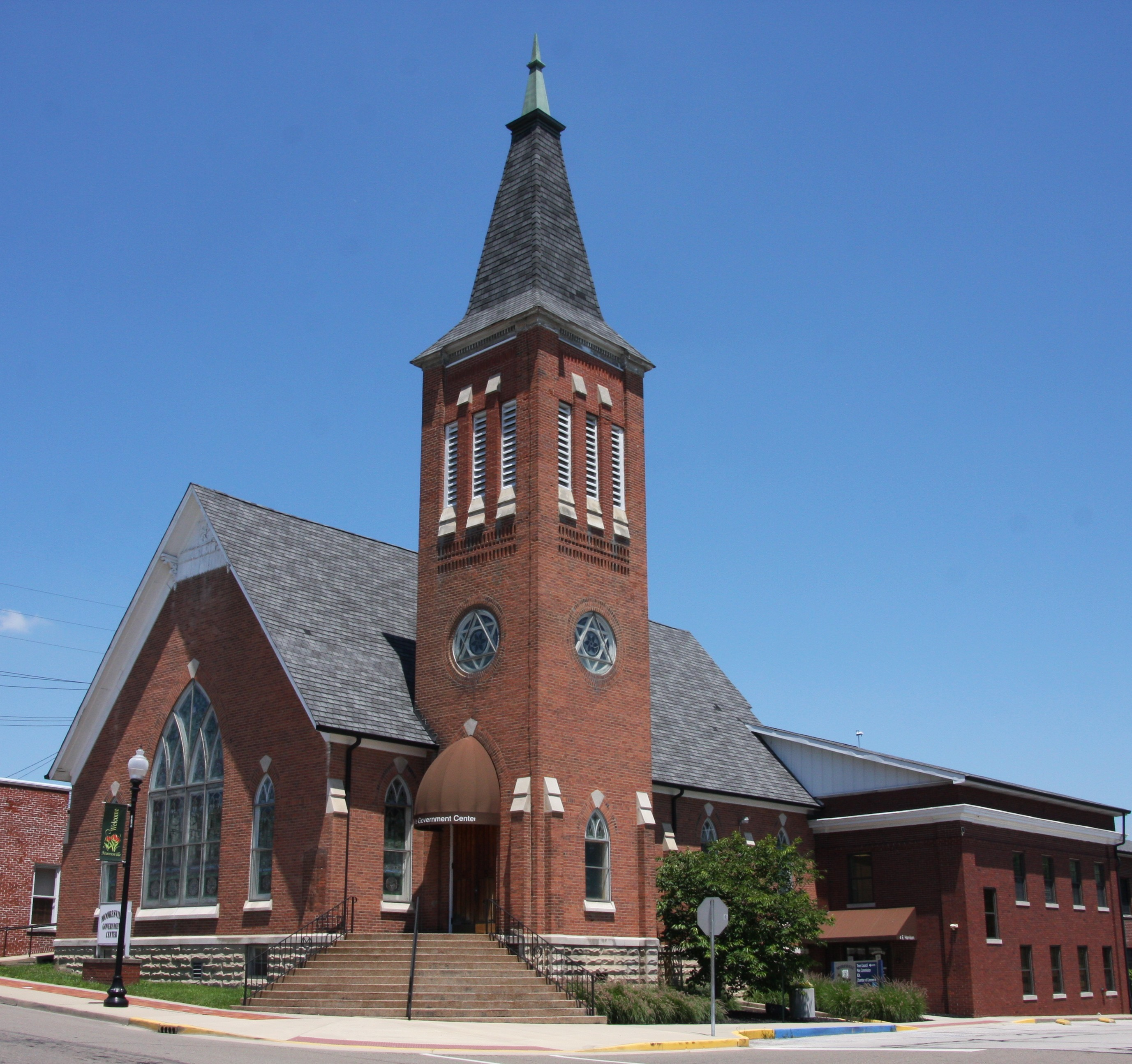
- Mooresville Government Center, formerly a Methodist church

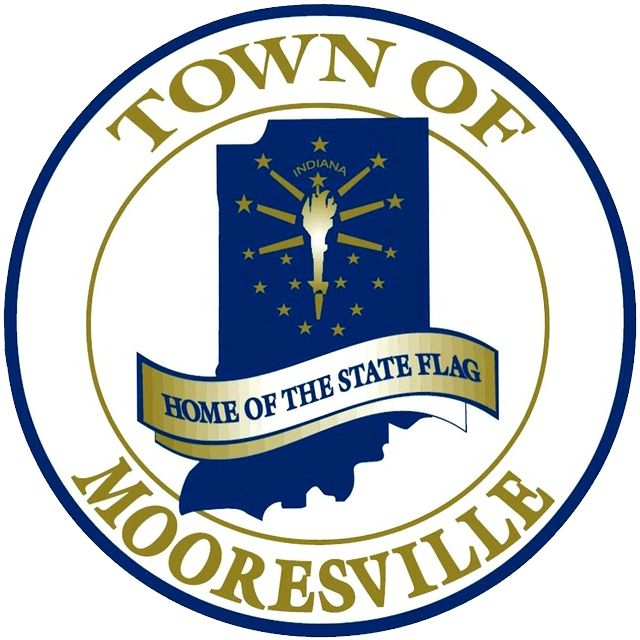
- Flag Seal
- Nickname: "Home of the State Flag"
- Location in Morgan County, Indiana
- Coordinates: 39°36′29″N 86°22′9″W
- Country: United States
- State: Indiana
- County: Morgan
- Township: Brown
- Founder: Samuel Moore

Government
  - President: Tom Warthen
  - Vice President: Greg Swinney
  - Member - Ward 2: Kirk Witt
  - Member - Ward 3: Jeff Cook
  - Member - Ward 5: Josh Brown

Area
  - Total: 6.76 sq mi (17.52 km^{2})
  - Land: 6.71 sq mi (17.37 km^{2})
  - Water: 0.058 sq mi (0.15 km^{2})
- Elevation: 659 ft (201 m)

Population (2020)
  - Total: 9,411
  - Density: 1,403.5/sq mi (541.88/km^{2})
- Time zone: UTC-5 (Eastern (EST))
  - Summer (DST): UTC-4 (EDT)
- ZIP code: 46158
- Area codes: 317, 463
- FIPS code: 18-50976
- GNIS feature ID: 2396780
- Website: mooresville.in.gov

Mooresville is a town in Brown Township, Morgan County, in the U.S. state of Indiana. The town is notable for being where the current flag of Indiana was created. As of the 2020 census, the town population was 9,411.

== History ==
Mooresville was founded in 1824 by Samuel Moore after he had bought the area for $2 per acre. The town is named for him. A post office has been in operation at Mooresville since 1826.

The Mooresville Commercial Historic District, Mooresville Friends Academy Building, and Mooresville Gymnasium are listed on the National Register of Historic Places.

The town was home to Paul Hadley, a watercolorist, who in 1916, had designed the current Indiana state flag for a flag contest sponsored by the Daughters of the American Revolution during the state's 1916 centennial anniversary. Hadley's flag design was adopted as the official state banner on May 31, 1917, and was later renamed to the official state flag in 1955.

On April 8, 2020, an EF1 tornado hit downtown, with significant winds around 100 miles per hour (160 km/h). From this tornado, a building on the southeast corner of Indiana and Main streets had partially collapsed in on itself. There were no injuries from the event. The building sat ruined for several months before being torn down. Due to the building's old age, the damages could not have been repaired.

On July 3, 2020, a group of 100 Black Lives Matter protesters marched through the streets of the town. This protest was met with quick counter protesting from a group of town locals. The two groups of protesters stood at a face off across the road on 31 S Indiana Street, with the situation escalating to the point where a small group of men camped out on a nearby roof of a business wielding multiple guns. Police at the scene were aware of the men with guns, but they couldn't do anything as the men were on their private property. The scene played out for several hours, only being held back by the police on both sides of the road.

In November 2023, the retail supermarket store Walmart in collaboration with Hasbro had released a Monopoly board game themed after the town of Mooresville titled "Mooresville-Opoly." This board game sold for a limited time at the Camby Walmart store only.

== Geography ==
Mooresville is in northeastern Morgan County; the northern border of the town follows the Hendricks County line.

According to the U.S. Census Bureau, Mooresville has a total area of 6.76 square miles (17.51 km^{2}), of which 0.06 square miles (0.16 km^{2}), or 0.84%, are water. The center of Mooresville sits between White Lick Creek to the west and its East Fork to the east. White Lick Creek flows south to join the White River north of Martinsville.

== Demographics ==
Historical population
Census	Pop.	Note	%±
1850	550		—
1860	780		41.8%
1870	1,229		57.6%
1880	864		−29.7%
1890	891		3.1%
1900	974		9.3%
1910	1,608		65.1%
1920	1,781		10.8%
1930	1,910		7.2%
1940	1,979		3.6%
1950	2,264		14.4%
1960	3,856		70.3%
1970	5,800		50.4%
1980	5,349		−7.8%
1990	5,541		3.6%
2000	9,273		67.4%
2010	9,326		0.6%
2020	9,411		0.9%
U.S. Decennial Census

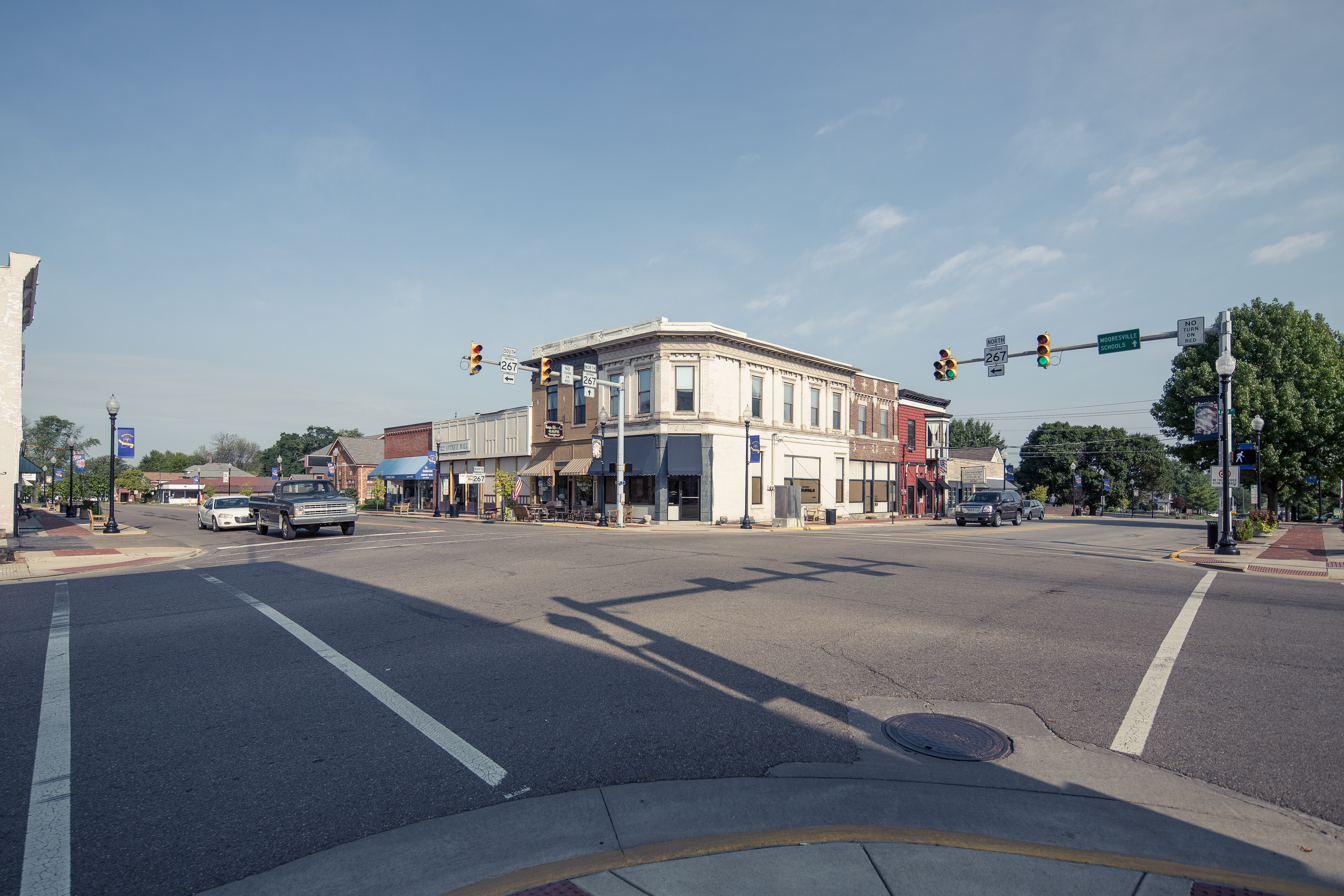
Downtown Mooresville

=== 2020 census ===
As of the 2020 census, Mooresville had a population of 9,411. The median age was 42.3 years. 22.3% of residents were under the age of 18 and 19.3% of residents were 65 years of age or older. For every 100 females there were 90.7 males, and for every 100 females age 18 and over there were 86.8 males age 18 and over.

99.7% of residents lived in urban areas, while 0.3% lived in rural areas.

There were 3,870 households in Mooresville, of which 29.4% had children under the age of 18 living in them. Of all households, 46.0% were married-couple households, 16.4% were households with a male householder and no spouse or partner present, and 30.4% were households with a female householder and no spouse or partner present. About 29.0% of all households were made up of individuals and 13.9% had someone living alone who was 65 years of age or older.

There were 4,069 housing units, of which 4.9% were vacant. The homeowner vacancy rate was 0.5% and the rental vacancy rate was 6.0%.

Racial composition as of the 2020 census
Race	Number	Percent
White	8,785	93.3%
Black or African American	34	0.4%
American Indian and Alaska Native	25	0.3%
Asian	68	0.7%
Native Hawaiian and Other Pacific Islander	3	0.0%
Some other race	66	0.7%
Two or more races	430	4.6%
Hispanic or Latino (of any race)	158	1.7%

=== 2010 census ===
As of the census of 2010, there were 9,326 people, 3,715 households, and 2,558 families living in the town. The population density was 1,482.7 inhabitants per square mile (572.5/km^{2}). There were 3,930 housing units at an average density of 624.8 per square mile (241.2/km^{2}). The racial makeup of the town was 97.5% White, 0.3% African American, 0.2% Native American, 0.5% Asian, 0.3% from other races, and 1.2% from two or more races. Hispanic or Latino of any race were 1.1% of the population.

There were 3,715 households, of which 36.1% had children under the age of 18 living with them, 49.0% were married couples living together, 14.2% had a female householder with no male present, 5.6% had a male householder with no female present, and 31.1% were non-families. 26.5% of all households were made up of individuals, and 11.6% had someone living alone who was 65 years of age or older. The average household size was 2.49 and the average family size was 2.99.

The median age in the town was 38.6 years. 25.4% of residents were under the age of 18; 8.3% were between the ages of 18 and 24; 26.4% were from 25 to 44; 25.6% were from 45 to 64; and 14.3% were 65 years of age or older. The gender makeup of the town was 47.1% male and 52.9% female.

=== 2000 census ===
As of the census of 2000, there were 9,273 people, 3,535 households, and 2,594 families living in the town. The population density was 1,675.0 inhabitants per square mile (646.7/km^{2}). There were 3,688 housing units at an average density of 666.2 per square mile (257.2/km^{2}). The racial makeup of the town was 98.52% White, 0.09% African American, 0.30% Native American, 0.40% Asian, 0.02% Pacific Islander, 0.18% from other races, and 0.49% from two or more races. Hispanic or Latino of any race were 0.72% of the population.

There were 3,535 households, out of which 39.1% had children under the age of 18 living with them, 57.5% were married couples living together, 12.4% had a female householder with no male present, and 26.6% were non-families. 22.8% of all households were made up of individuals, and 8.9% had someone living alone who was 65 years of age or older. The average household size was 2.59 and the average family size was 3.05.

In the town, the population was spread out, with 28.5% under the age of 18, 8.5% from 18 to 24, 32.7% from 25 to 44, 19.3% from 45 to 64, and 11.0% who were 65 years of age or older. The median age was 33 years. For every 100 females, there were 90.7 males. For every 100 females age 18 and over, there were 87.5 males.

The median income for a household in the town was $47,292, and the median income for a family was $52,543. Males had a median income of $37,763 versus $26,520 for females. The per capita income for the town was $21,504. About 4.2% of families and 4.3% of the population were below the poverty line, including 6.6% of those under age 18 and 3.3% of those age 65 or over.

== Arts and culture ==
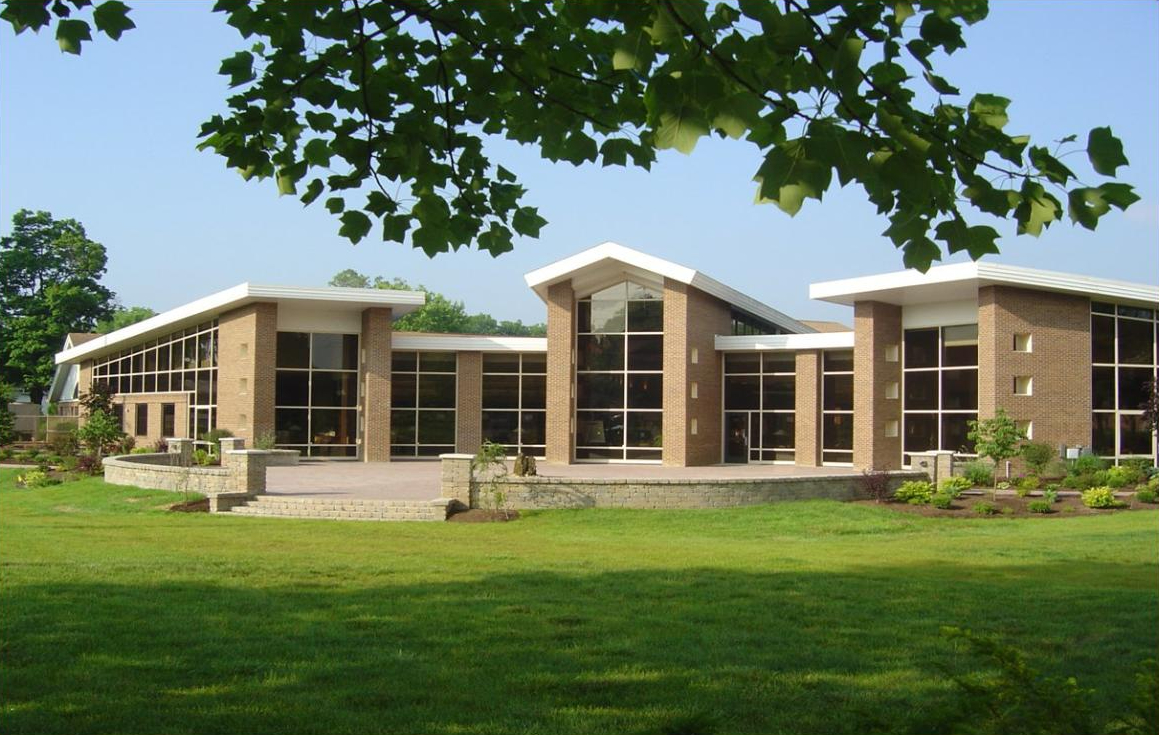
Mooresville Public Library

Every year, in early August, the town holds an "Old Settlers Fair" that involves a parade through downtown Mooresville and carnival attractions at Pioneer Park. The event usually lasts between three and four days. The first of these events, originally called Old Settlers Reunion and Picnic, was held on August 9, 1870, and was original held at Old Town Park in Mooresville after the land was donated by Samuel Moore. Old Town Park was used to hold this event every year, except for 1943, until 1995. Pioneer Park become the center for this event after 1995.

The town has a lending library, the Mooresville Public Library.

== Education ==
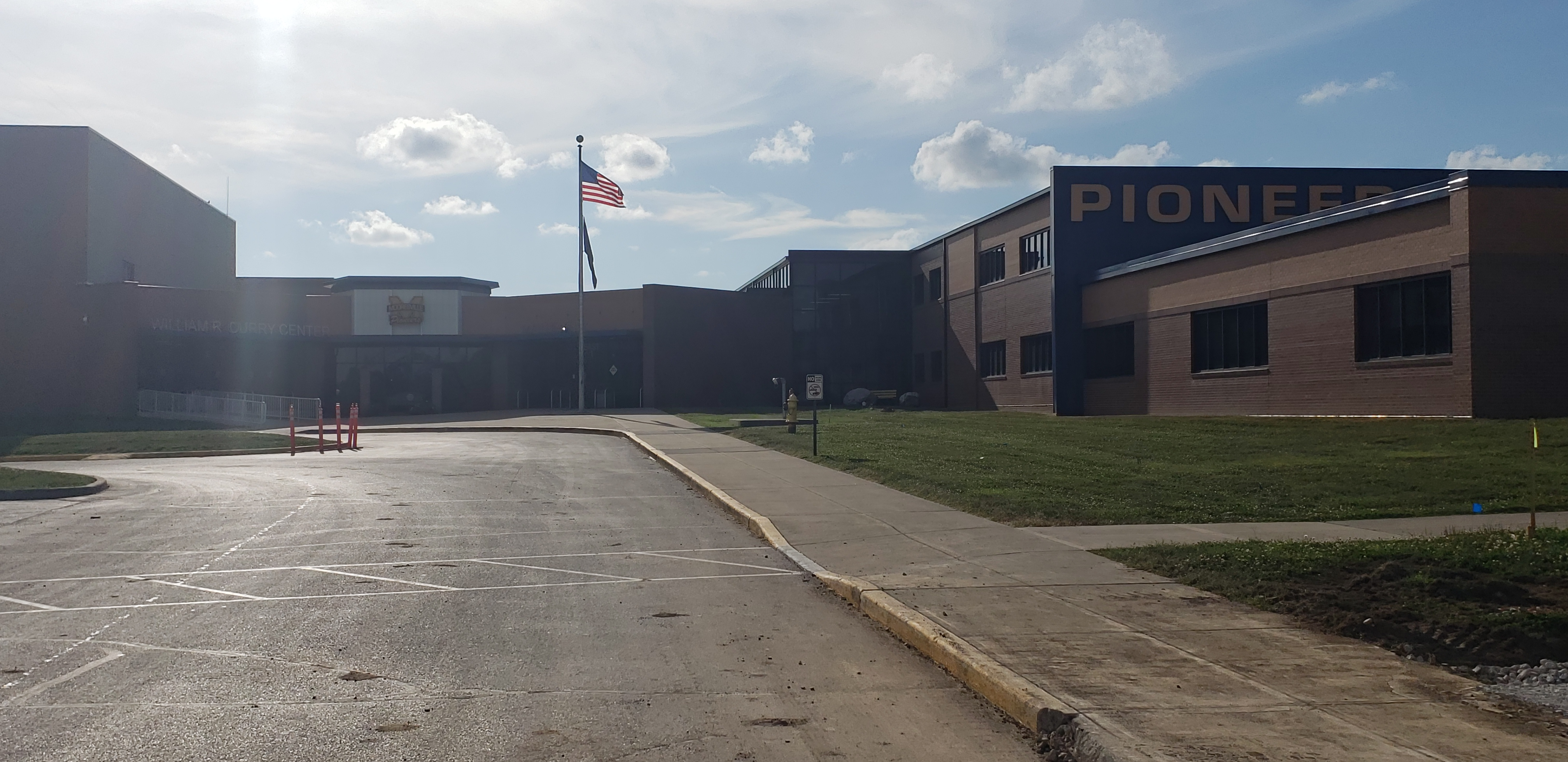
Mooresville High School

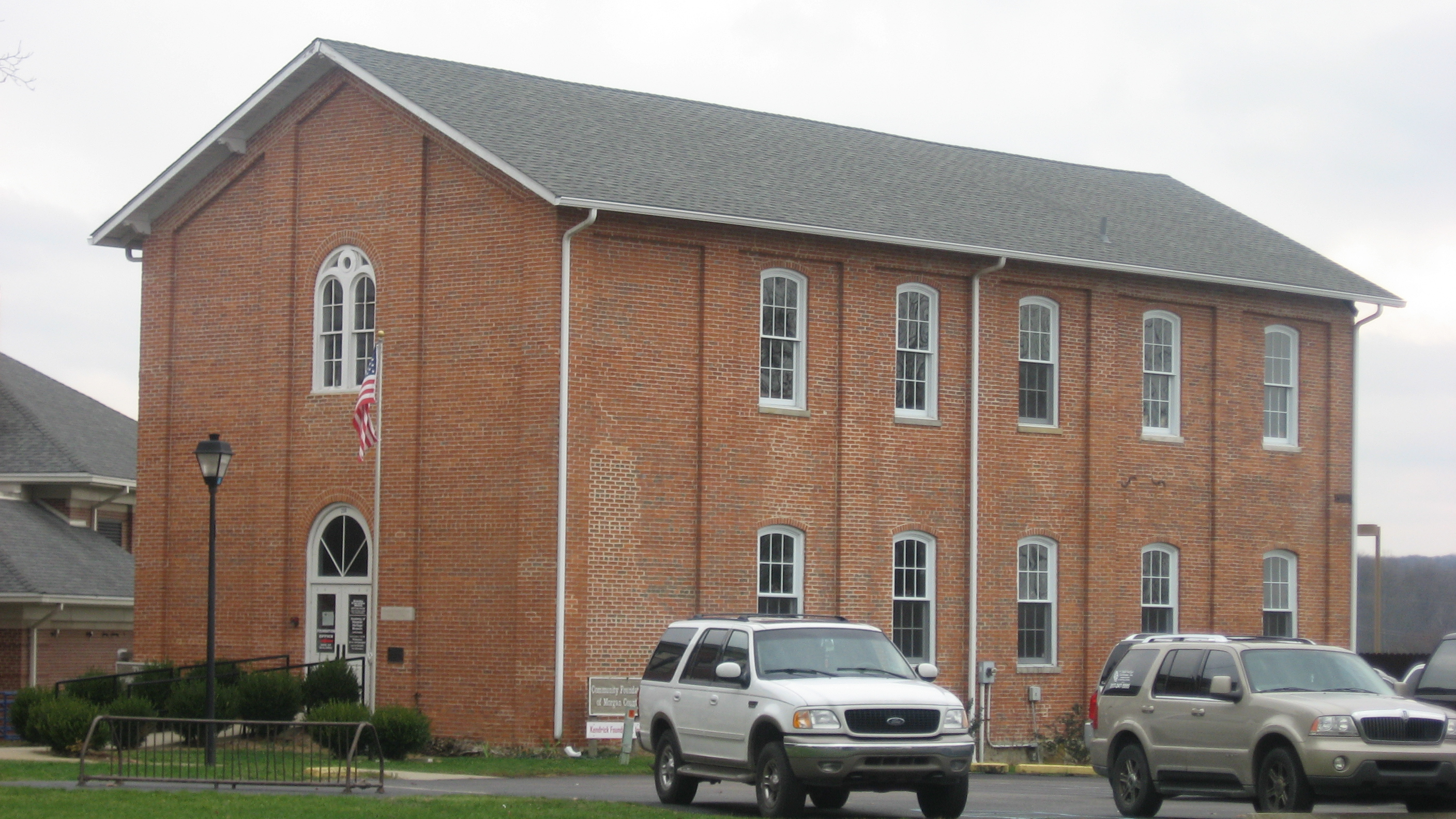
Mooresville Friends Academy Building

Mooresville schools are part of the Mooresville Consolidated School Corporation. Schools include:

- Newby Memorial Elementary
- Neil A. Armstrong Elementary, named after the Apollo 11 astronaut of the same name
- Northwood Elementary
- North Madison Elementary
- Waverly Elementary
- Paul Hadley Middle School, named after the designer of the Indiana state flag
- Mooresville High School

=== Private school ===
- Mooresville Christian Academy, founded in 1975

=== Mooresville Friends Academy ===
The Mooresville school system began with the Friends Academy, which was built in 1861. The Academy Building, one of the first high schools in the state of Indiana, was a boarding school with students renting rooms from area residents. The school building sits on the Newby Memorial Elementary School campus, has been restored, and is listed on the National Register of Historic Places. The building now serves as a local history museum as well as the offices of the Community Foundation of Morgan County, Inc. Also on the Newby campus is the "old Newby gym" or the "Newby Dome." The gym was built in the early 1900s with help from Mooresville residents who each contributed $100 to help build the facility. The campus also includes the Mooresville Veterans Memorial, which honors Mooresville's fallen soldiers from World War I and beyond. The Memorial also honors Sammy Lee Davis, who received the Medal of Honor for heroism in Vietnam. Davis is known as "The Real Forrest Gump" since his Vietnam story is mirrored in the movie Forrest Gump and his Medal of Honor ceremony footage is used in the movie.

== Infrastructure ==
=== Transportation ===
Mooresville is served by Indiana State Road 67. Indiana State Road 42 and Indiana State Road 144 end at SR 67 southeast of the town center.

=== Health care ===
Mooresville is served by Franciscan St. Francis Health-Mooresville, formerly known as Kendrick Hospital and St. Francis Hospital-Mooresville. The full-service hospital includes an emergency department, labor and delivery, cancer care, and it is home to the Joint Replacement Surgeons of Indiana Research Foundation.

== Notable people ==
- William G. Bray, Republican, elected to the U.S. House of Representatives in 1950 and served from the 82nd to 93rd Congress.
- Herbert Carter (1910–2007), American biochemist
- John Dillinger, gangster and bank robber who used Mooresville, his hometown, as a hideout.
- Paul Hadley, designer of the Indiana state flag.
- Julia D. Nelson, elected to the Indiana House of Representatives in 1921, the first woman elected to the Indiana General Assembly.
- Amos Rusie, member of the Baseball Hall of Fame.
- Ruth Hinshaw Spray, peace activist.
- Nan Whaley, mayor of Dayton, Ohio.
