= Julia D. Nelson =

American politician (1863–1936)

Member of the Indiana House of Representatives from the Delaware County district
- In office 1921–1923
- Preceded by: J. Clark McKinley

Personal details
- Born: December 11, 1863 Mooresville, Indiana, United States
- Died: May 27, 1936 (aged 72) Indianapolis, Indiana, United States
- Party: Republican
- Spouse: Edward F. Nelson
- Profession: Homemaker

Julia D. Nelson (December 11, 1863 – May 27, 1936) was an American politician elected to the Indiana House of Representatives in 1921, the first woman elected to the Indiana General Assembly.

== Early life ==
Nelson was born in Mooresville, Indiana. She moved to Indianapolis around 1887, and then to Muncie around 1903.

Nelson attended common schools and high school.

She was married to Edward F. Nelson, with whom she had three children.

Nelson was Chair of the Delaware County Republican Women in 1920. She was active in the suffrage movement, the Eastern Star, and the State Assembly Women's Club.

Nelson returned to Indianapolis in 1923.

== Career ==
Nelson was elected to the Indiana House of Representatives in 1921, representing Delaware County.

Her first speech in office addressed the care of poor parents by their children. While in office, Nelson supported legislation to regulate the hours of women in industry, and to establishing a state probation officer. She also supported a poll tax for women, and increased salaries for legislators. Nelson introduced a bill supporting movie censorship.

== Later life ==
Her husband Edward died in 1923.

Julia D. Nelson died in Indianapolis on May 27, 1936.
