= Salida Regional Library =

Public library in Colorado, USA

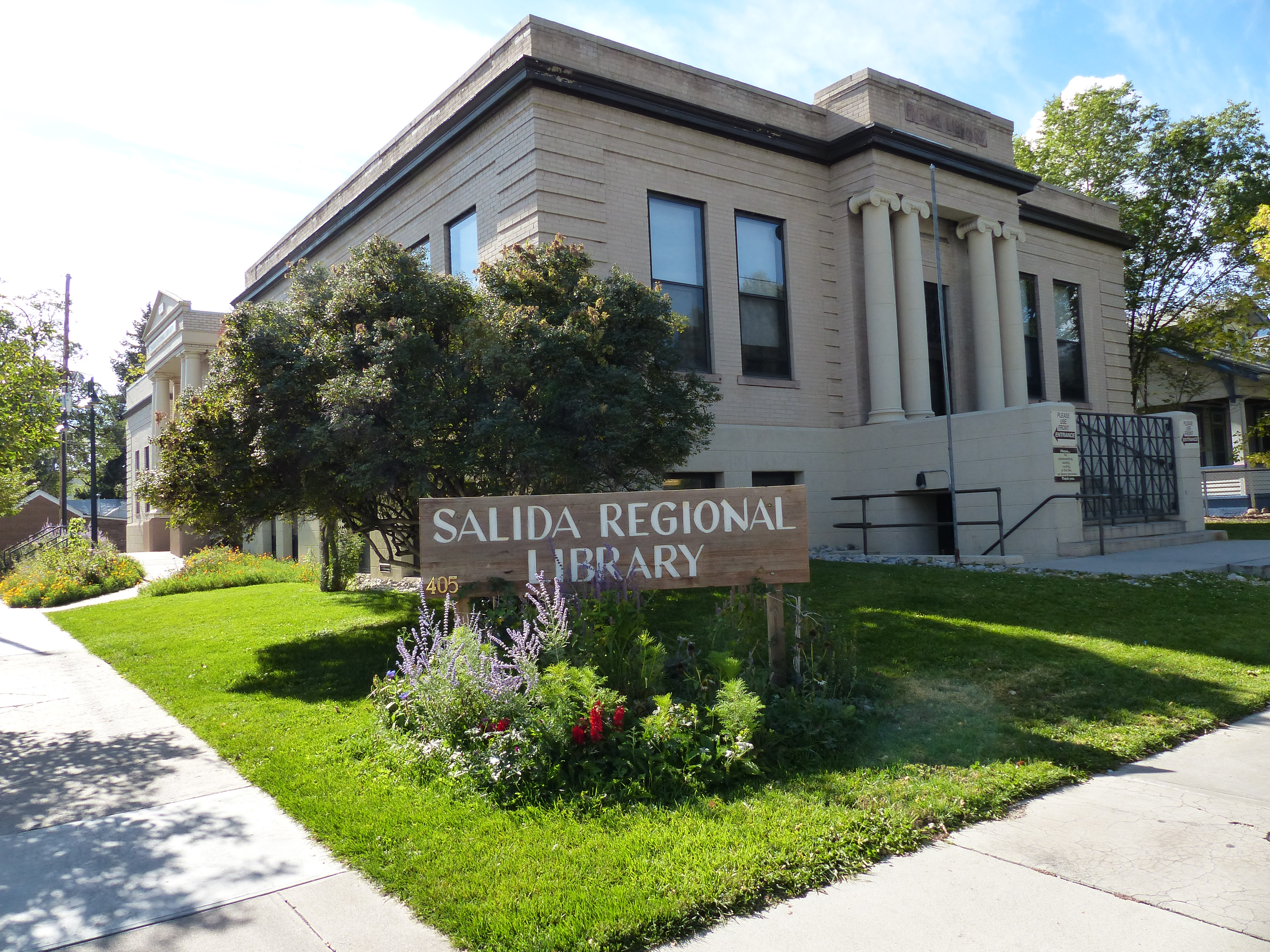
- The Salida Regional Library
- 38.532766°N 105.993052°W
- Location: Salida, Colorado
- Established: 1894
- Branch of: Marmot Library System

Other information
- Director: Susan Matthews
- Employees: 16
- Website: www.salidalibrary.org

The Salida Regional Library is a public library in Salida, Colorado and serves a regional population in southern Chaffee County, Colorado. The library was constructed in 1908 with funds from industrialist Andrew Carnegie and is currently part of the Marmot Library System.

== History ==
In 1894, the Tuesday Evening Club, a spirited group of Salida townswomen, made the decision that the town of Salida needed a library. The club sponsored lectures and held Chautauquas, put on musical entertainments, and held fundraisers and receptions. They purchased books at second-hand bookstores and opened library rooms at various places in Salida. The Tuesday Evening Club official incorporated the Salida Library Association in 1902.

In 1905, the Club wrote a letter to Andrew Carnegie requesting additional funding to build a library. He agreed and donated $9,000 with the stipulation that the Club find a suitable site for the building. The Club, along with the town, raised an additional $6,000 and the culmination of their efforts resulted in the opening of the Salida Public Library in 1908.

== Services ==
As a member of the Marmot Library System, the Salida Regional Library offers access to the library's catalog and to other member libraries. The library offers online subscription databases for research. Library programs include Children's Storytime, Book Clubs, and Summer Reading.

The library also offers a digital archive filled with images from Salida's past.
