= Mooresville Commercial Historic District =

Historic district in Indiana, United States

- U.S. National Register of Historic Places
- U.S. Historic district
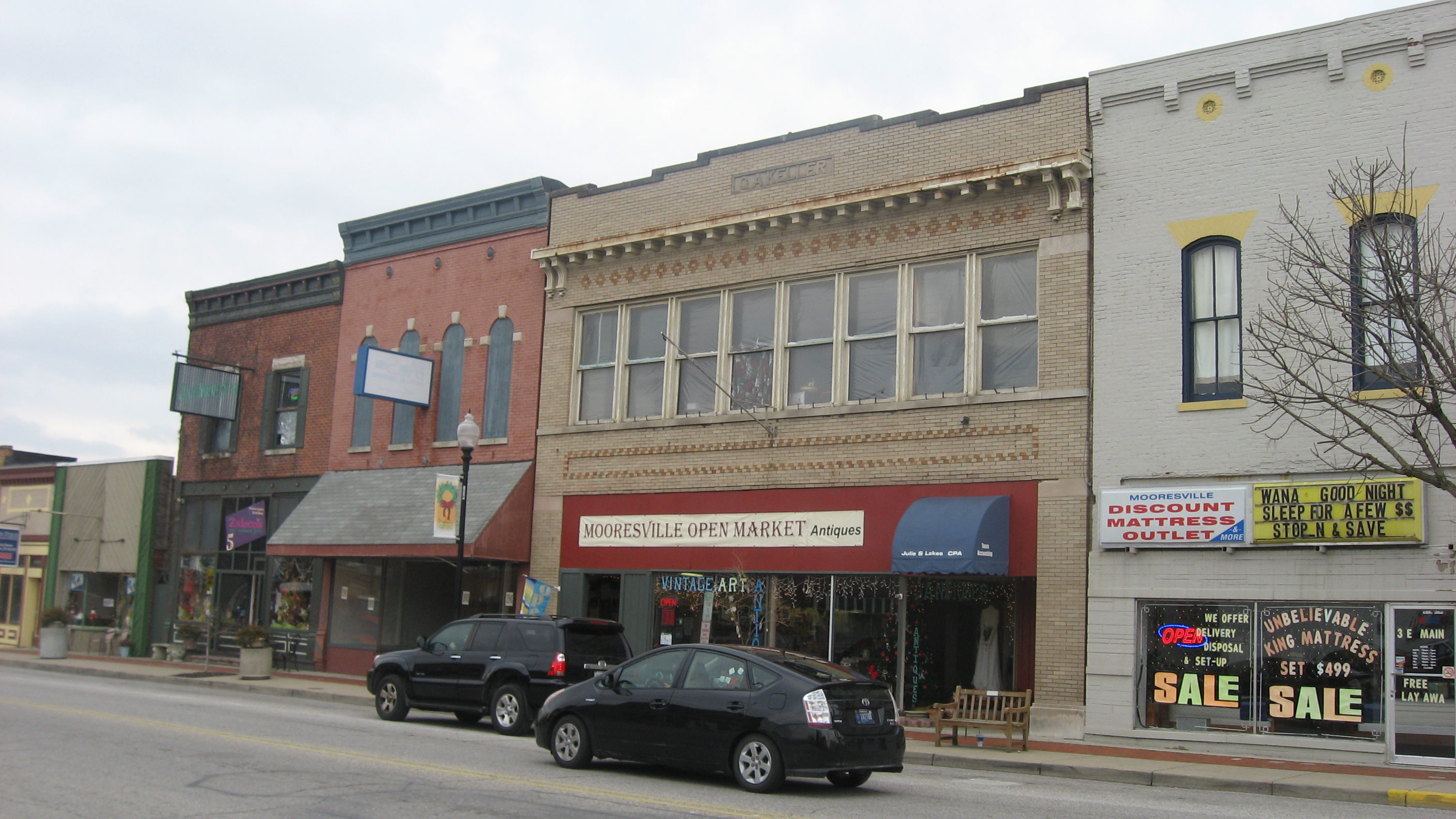
- Mooresville Commercial Historic District, December 2011

- Location within Indiana Location within the United States
- Location: roughly, one blk N, S, E and W of the corner of Main and Indiana, Mooresville, Indiana
- Coordinates: 39°36′46″N 86°22′32″W
- Area: 4.5 acres (1.8 ha)
- Architect: Brookie, True L.; et.al.
- Architectural style: Late Victorian, Late 19th And Early 20th Century American Movements
- NRHP reference No.: 03000147
- Added to NRHP: March 26, 2003

Mooresville Commercial Historic District is a national historic district located at Mooresville, Indiana. The district encompasses 35 contributing buildings and one contributing object in the central business district of Mooresville. It developed between about 1872 and 1952, and includes notable examples of Italianate, Gothic Revival, Classical Revival, Commercial Style, and Bungalow/American Craftsman style architecture. Notable buildings include the Farmer's State Bank, Nelson and Son Hardware, Mooresville Carnegie Library (1916), Carlisle and Gilbert Building (1895), Pure Oil Service Station, A.H. Scruggs Building, Mooresville Municipal Building, and Mooresville Methodist Episcopal Church complex.

It was listed on the National Register of Historic Places in 2003.
