= Indiana State Road 144 =

Highway in Indiana

State Road 144
- SR 54 highlighted in red

Route information
- Maintained by INDOT
- Length: 11.964 mi (19.254 km)

Western section
- Length: 7.155 mi (11.515 km)
- West end: SR 42 / SR 67 in Mooresville
- East end: I-69 in Bargersville

Eastern section
- Length: 4.808 mi (7.738 km)
- West end: SR 135 in Bargersville
- East end: SR 44 in Franklin

Location
- Country: United States
- State: Indiana
- Counties: Morgan, Johnson

Highway system
- Indiana State Highway System; Interstate; US; State; Scenic
← SR 143	→ SR 145

State Road 144 (SR 144) in the U.S. state of Indiana is a highway that exists in two short disconnected segments south of Indianapolis.

== Route description ==
The western segment of SR 144 begins at an intersection with SR 42 and SR 67 in Mooresville. Traveling southeast in the far northeast of rural Morgan County, SR 144 crosses over the White River before entering Johnson County and the town of Bargersville before terminating at a dogbone interchange with I-69.

The eastern segment begins at an intersection with SR 135 in central Bargersville. Continuing southeast through rural Johnson County, SR 144 terminates at a roundabout with SR 44 in Franklin.

The gap between the two segments is connected by a highway called County Road 144 (CR 144). It was previously signed with CR 144 signs at its west and east ends at I-69 and SR 135, respectively. It is also known as Old Plank Road in Bargersville. It is one of the very few county roads in Indiana with a numerical designation identical to that of an adjoining state road, similar to how it is done in Florida.

== History ==
SR 144 was added to the state road system in 1930, running along its current routing between SR 35 (now SR 135) in Old Bargersville and US 31 in Franklin. SR 144 and SR 35 were commissioned to help relieve traffic on US 31 between Franklin and Indianapolis. This segment of SR 144 was paved in 1931. The segment between Mooresville and Waverly was added to the state road system between 1939 and 1941 with an intermediate road surface. SR 37 (now I-69) was rerouted around Waverly, and SR 144 was extended east to meet at the time the new SR 37 northeast of Waverly between 1963 and 1965. The western segment was paved between 1965 and 1966. SR 144 was rerouted to bypass Waverly between 1969 and 1970. In 2014, the eastern terminus of SR 144 was moved to the intersection with SR 44, with the Indiana Department of Transportation (INDOT) transferring the segment of SR 44 and SR 144 on Jefferson Street to the city of Franklin.

== Major intersections ==
County	Location	mi	km	Destinations	Notes
Morgan	Mooresville	0.000	0.000	SR 42 west / SR 67 – Indianapolis, Martinsville	Western terminus of SR 144; route continues west as SR 42
Johnson	White River Township	7.155	11.515	I-69 / CR 144 – Evansville, Indianapolis	Eastern terminus of the western section of SR 144; I-69 Exit 153; route continues east as CR 144
Johnson	Gap in route				
Johnson	Bargersville	7.156	11.516	SR 135 / CR 144 – Waverly, Nashville, Indianapolis	Western terminus of the eastern section of SR 144; route continues west as CR 144
Johnson	Franklin	11.964	19.254	SR 44 west / Jefferson Street – Franklin, Martinsville	Eastern terminus of the western section of SR 44; Eastern terminus of SR 144
1.000 mi = 1.609 km; 1.000 km = 0.621 mi
