= Nineveh, Indiana =

- Unincorporated community and census-designated place
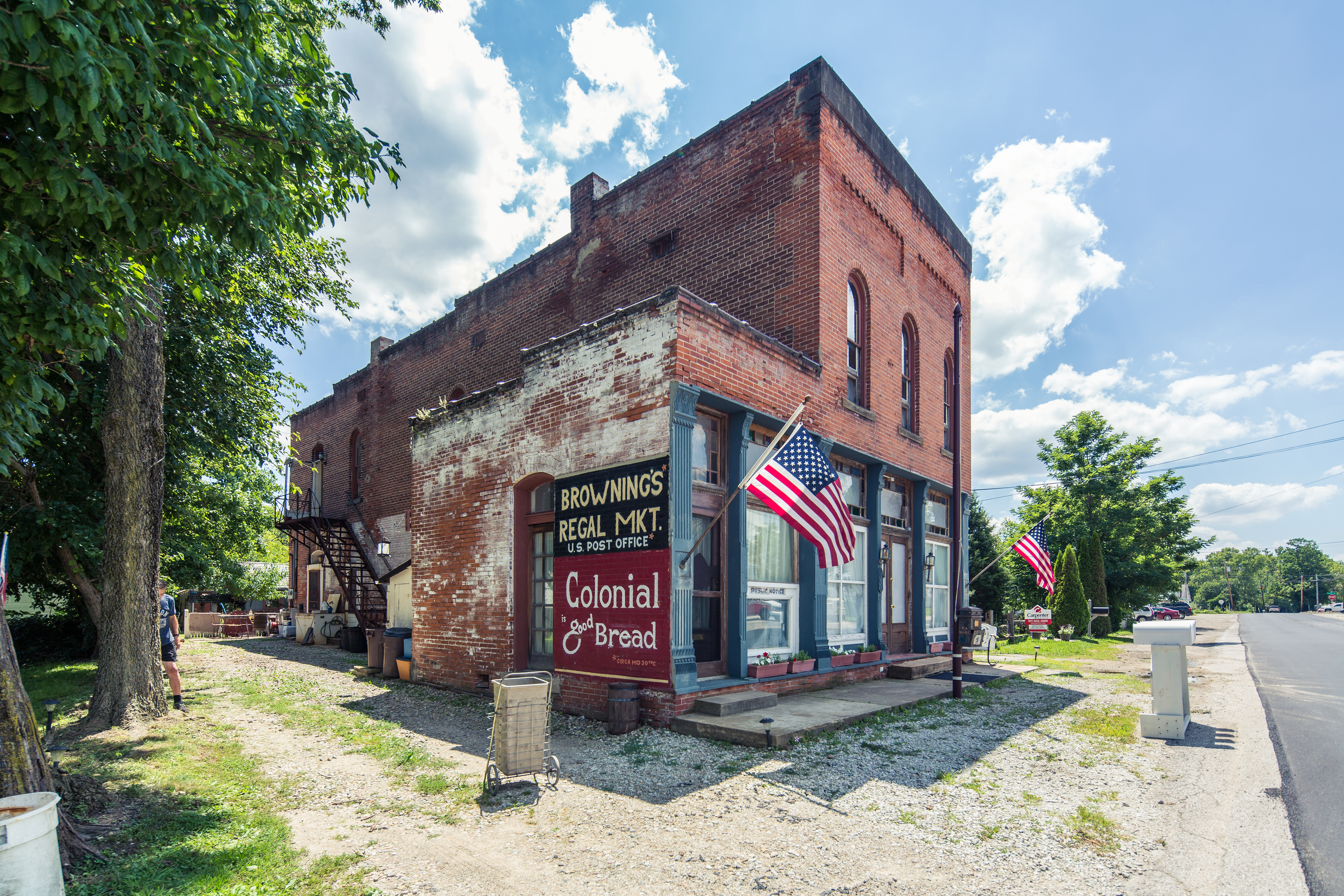

- Location within Indiana Location within the United States
- Coordinates: 39°21′40″N 86°05′34″W
- Country: United States
- State: Indiana
- County: Johnson
- Township: Nineveh
- Elevation: 804 ft (245 m)
- ZIP code: 46164
- FIPS code: 18-53982
- GNIS feature ID: 2830427

Nineveh is an unincorporated community in Nineveh Township, Johnson County, Indiana, United States.

Nineveh took its name from Nineveh Creek, which in turn is named after Nineveh Berry, a hunter who fell into the creek while hunting for deer.

The town also has the Cordry-Sweetwater branch library.

Scenes from the film Hoosiers were shot in the old Nineveh Elementary School, which was renamed "Hickory High School" for the film. Nineveh's last class of students attended here during the filming of the film in 1985, after which they relocated to Trafalgar to consolidate at Indian Creek Elementary School. The old school was lost to a fire just a few years after it was closed for consolidation.

== Demographics ==
The United States Census Bureau defined Ninevah as a census designated place in the 2022 American Community Survey.

== Notable people ==
- William Merritt Chase, painter
- Cliff Griffith, Indy car driver
- Harry McQuinn, Indy car driver
- Jack and Stephen Quire, YouTube personalities known for their "Greatest freakout ever" series
