= Indiana State Road 44 =

Highway in Indiana

State Road 44
- SR 44 highlighted in red

Route information
- Maintained by INDOT
- Length: 86.198 mi (138.722 km)
- Existed: October 1, 1926–present

Western section
- Length: 18.588 mi (29.914 km)
- West end: I-69 in Martinsville
- Major intersections: SR 135 in Johnson County
- East end: SR 144 in Franklin

Eastern section
- Length: 67.610 mi (108.808 km)
- West end: I-65 at Franklin
- Major intersections: I-74 / US 421 at Shelbyville; US 52 at Rushville; US 27 at Liberty
- East end: SR 725 near Fairhaven, OH

Location
- Country: United States
- State: Indiana
- Counties: Fayette, Johnson, Morgan, Rush, Shelby, Union

Highway system
- Indiana State Highway System; Interstate; US; State; Scenic
← SR 43	→ SR 45

Indiana State Road 44 (SR 44) in the state of Indiana begins in the west at Interstate 69 in Martinsville and runs eastward to the Ohio state line in Union County in two broken sections. It is broken in Franklin from Indiana State Road 144 and Interstate 65.

== Route description ==
From Martinsville, its western terminus, at I-69, SR 44 heads east toward Franklin. Upon entering Franklin SR 44 ends at the intersection with State Road 144. (The route continues east as Jefferson St. and crosses US 31 and onto Forsythe and King Streets to Interstate 65.) East of Franklin SR 44 then begins again at an interchange with Interstate 65 (I-65). SR 44 continues east towards Shelbyville. SR 44 has a short concurrency with State Road 9 (SR 9) in Shelbyville. East of Shelbyville SR 44 has an interchange with Interstate 74/U.S. Route 421. SR 44 heads northeast towards Rushville. In Rushville SR 44 has a short concurrency with U.S. Route 52 and an intersection with State Road 3. From Rushville SR 44 heads east-northeast towards Connersville. In Connersville SR 44 has an intersection with the northern terminus of State Road 121 and a short concurrency with State Road 1. SR 44 heads east from Connersville towards Liberty. In Liberty SR 44 has a concurrency with U.S. Route 27. From Liberty SR 44 heads east towards Ohio; at the Ohio state line SR 44 becomes Ohio State Route 725.

== History ==
At one point, SR 44 went through Franklin, connecting the termini in Franklin.

== Major intersections ==
County	Location	mi	km	Destinations	Notes
Morgan	Washington Township	0.000	0.000	I-69 to SR 252 – Evansville, Indianapolis	Connector ramps to SR 252; Western terminus; road continues as Reuben Drive
Johnson	Union Township	13.580	21.855	SR 135	
Johnson	Franklin	18.588	29.914	SR 144 (Jefferson Street) – Bargersville	Eastern terminus of the western section of SR 44
Johnson	Franklin	Gap in route			
Johnson	Franklin	22.337– 22.487	35.948– 36.189	I-65 – Louisville, Indianapolis	Western terminus of the eastern section of SR 44; exit 90 on I-65; road continues as King Street
Shelby	Shelbyville	35.836	57.672	SR 9 south – Hope, Columbus	West end of SR 9 concurrency
Shelby	Shelbyville	38.428– 38.628	61.844– 62.166	I-74 / US 421 / SR 9 north – Indianapolis, Greenfield, Cincinnati	East end of SR 9 concurrency; exit 116 on I-74
Rush	Rushville	55.170	88.788	US 52 Truck east / Truck SR 44 east (1st Street)	East end of Truck US 52 concurrency; west end of Truck SR 44
Rush	Rushville	55.214	88.858	US 52 west (2nd Street) / US 52 Truck east – Indianapolis	West end of US 52 concurrency; west end of Truck US 52
Rush	Rushville	55.374	89.116	US 52 east / SR 3 (Main Street) – Greensburg, Brookville, New Castle	East end of US 52 concurrency; SR 3 north serves Rush Memorial Hospital
Rush	Rushville	55.449	89.237	Truck SR 44 west (Perkins Street)	East end of Truck SR 44
Fayette	Connersville	71.703	115.395	SR 121 south – Laurel	North end of SR 121
Fayette	Connersville	72.022	115.908	SR 1 north – Cambridge City	West end of SR 1 concurrency
Fayette	Connersville	72.500	116.677	SR 1 south – Brookville	East end of SR 1 concurrency
Union	Liberty	83.559	134.475	US 27 north – Richmond, Fort Wayne	West end of US 27 concurrency
Union	Liberty	83.620	134.573	SR 101 south – Brookville, Brookville Lake, Whitewater State Park, Quakertown S.R.A., Mounds S.R.A.	North end of SR 101
Union	Liberty	84.049	135.264	US 27 south – Oxford, Cincinnati	East end of US 27 concurrency
Union	Center Township	89.947	144.756	SR 725 east (State Line Road) – Camden	Continuation at the Ohio border
1.000 mi = 1.609 km; 1.000 km = 0.621 mi: Concurrency terminus
