= Indian Creek Senior High School =

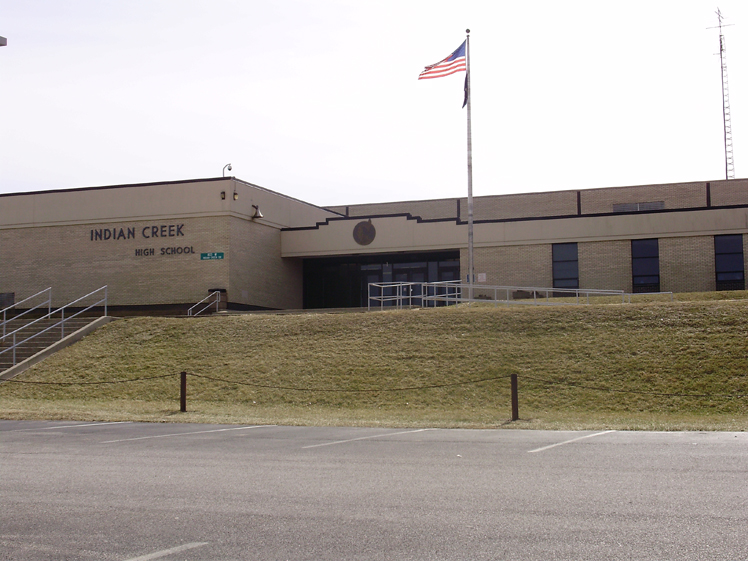
- Indian Creek High School in 2009

Location
- 803 West Indian Creek Drive; Trafalgar, Indiana 46181; United States
- Coordinates: 39°24′26″N 86°9′37″W

Information
- Type: Public high school
- Established: 1967
- School district: Nineveh-Hensley-Jackson United
- Superintendent: Matt Prusiecki
- NCES School ID: 180762001303
- Principal: Luke Skobel
- Teaching staff: 40.50 (FTE)
- Grades: 9-12
- Enrollment: 637 (2023-2024)
- Average class size: Less than 24
- Student to teacher ratio: 15.73
- Color
- Slogan: Empowering Excellence
- Athletics conference: Hoosier Legends Conference
- Nickname: Braves, I.C., The Creek
- National ranking: 6,651
- SAT average: 19.7%
- Information: 2024 Set school record for largest graduating class and highest graduation rate of 98.8%
- Website: www.indiancreekschools.com/high-school

Indian Creek Senior High School is a high school in Trafalgar, Indiana. It is a part of the Nineveh-Hensley-Jackson United School Corporation, serving Trafalgar, Morgantown, Indiana, Painted Hills, Indiana, and Prince's Lakes.

== See also ==
- List of high schools in Indiana
