= Providence, Indiana =

- Unincorporated community
- Location within Indiana Location within the United States
- Coordinates: 39°29′27″N 86°10′36″W
- Country: United States
- State: Indiana
- County: Johnson
- Township: Union
- Elevation: 837 ft (255 m)
- ZIP code: 46106
- FIPS code: 18-62172
- GNIS feature ID: 441616

Providence is an unincorporated community in Union Township, Johnson County, Indiana.

== History ==
Providence was originally called Union Village, and under the latter name was platted in 1837. A post office was established at Providence in 1880, and remained in operation until it was discontinued in 1908.
