= Urmeyville, Indiana =

- Unincorporated community
- Location within Indiana Location within the United States
- Coordinates: 39°31′19″N 85°59′07″W
- Country: United States
- State: Indiana
- County: Johnson
- Township: Needham
- Elevation: 735 ft (224 m)
- ZIP code: 46131
- FIPS code: 18-78074
- GNIS feature ID: 445178

Urmeyville is an unincorporated community in Needham Township, Johnson County, Indiana.

== History ==
Urmeyville was platted in 1866. A post office was established at Urmeyville in 1866, and remained in operation until it was discontinued in 1898.
