= Needham, Indiana =

- Unincorporated town and Census-designated place
- Location within Indiana Location within the United States
- Coordinates: 39°31′52″N 85°58′18″W
- Country: United States
- State: Indiana
- County: Johnson
- Township: Needham
- Elevation: 728 ft (222 m)
- ZIP code: 46131
- FIPS code: 18-52146
- GNIS feature ID: 2830426

Needham is an unincorporated town in Needham Township, Johnson County, Indiana.

== History ==
Needham was platted in 1866 by Noah Needham.

The post office was established as Needhams Station. The Needhams Station post office opened in 1866, and was officially renamed Needham in 1882.

== Demographics ==
The United States Census Bureau defined Needham as a census designated place in the 2022 American Community Survey.
