= Jackson Township, Morgan County, Indiana =

Jackson Township
- Township
- Logo

- Location in Morgan County
- Coordinates: 39°23′11″N 86°18′15″W
- Country: United States
- State: Indiana
- County: Morgan

Government
  - Type: Indiana township
  - Trustee: Matt Davidson

Area
  - Total: 35.92 sq mi (93.0 km^{2})
  - Land: 35.5 sq mi (92 km^{2})
  - Water: 0.42 sq mi (1.1 km^{2}) 1.17%
- Elevation: 794 ft (242 m)

Population (2020)
  - Total: 3,684
  - Density: 96.9/sq mi (37.4/km^{2})
- Time zone: UTC-5 (Eastern (EST))
  - Summer (DST): UTC-4 (EDT)
- ZIP codes: 46151, 46160
- GNIS feature ID: 453456
- Website: jacksontownshipofmorganco.gov

Jackson Township is one of fourteen townships in Morgan County, Indiana, United States. As of the 2010 census, its population was 3,439 and it contained 1,437 housing units.

== History ==
The Cedar Point Farm, Elm Spring Farm, and Lamb's Creek Bridge are listed on the National Register of Historic Places.

== Geography ==
According to the 2010 census, the township has a total area of 35.92 square miles (93.0 km^{2}), of which 35.5 square miles (92 km^{2}) (or 98.83%) is land and 0.42 square miles (1.1 km^{2}) (or 1.17%) is water.

=== Cities, towns, villages ===
- Morgantown
- Painted Hills

=== Cemeteries ===
The township contains these three cemeteries: Gerholt, Nast Chapel and Williams.

=== Major highways ===
- Indiana State Road 135
- Indiana State Road 252

=== Lakes ===
- Tall Oaks Lake
- Whitley Lake
- Little Nebo Lake
- Painted Hills Lake

== School districts ==
- Nineveh-Hensley-Jackson United School Corporation

== Political districts ==
- Indiana's 4th congressional district
- State House District 47
- State Senate District 37
