= Lawrence Borst =

American veterinarian and politician

Member of the Indiana Senate from the 36th district
- In office 1969–2005
- Succeeded by: Brent Waltz

Personal details
- Born: Lawrence Marion Borst Jr. July 16, 1927 Champaign County, Ohio
- Died: December 20, 2016 (aged 89)

Lawrence Marion "Larry" Borst Jr. (July 16, 1927 – December 20, 2016) was an American veterinarian and politician.

Borst was born in Champaign County, Ohio and graduated from North High School. He met and married Eldoris June Wood in 1948 and moved to South Bend, Indiana two years later upon earning a Doctor of Veterinary Medicine from Ohio State University. He then moved to Indianapolis in 1952 and began his own veterinary practice in 1954. In 1965, Borst became the founding leader of the Republican Action Committee. He served one year, 1967, in the Indiana House of Representatives, before his 1968 election to the Indiana Senate as a representative of district 36, which included Johnson and Marion Counties. Borst retained his state senatorial seat until 2005. He was also active in the local politics of Indianapolis. In 1971, Borst was named to the Mayor's Progress Committee of Indianapolis, and became a member of the executive council in 1973.

Borst wrote a memoir, Gentlemen, It's Been My Pleasure: Four Decades in the Indiana Legislature in 2003. He died on December 20, 2016, at the age of 89.
