= Painted Hills, Indiana =

- Census-designated place
- Location in Morgan County, Indiana
- Coordinates: 39°23′47″N 86°20′58″W
- Country: United States
- State: Indiana
- County: Morgan
- Township: Jackson

Area
  - Total: 1.95 sq mi (5.05 km^{2})
  - Land: 1.73 sq mi (4.48 km^{2})
  - Water: 0.22 sq mi (0.57 km^{2})
- Elevation: 719 ft (219 m)

Population (2020)
  - Total: 766
  - Density: 442.9/sq mi (171.01/km^{2})
- Time zone: UTC-5 (Eastern (EST))
  - Summer (DST): UTC-4 (EDT)
- ZIP code: 46151 (Martinsville)
- Area code: 765
- GNIS feature ID: 2629876
- FIPS code: 18-57632

Painted Hills is an unincorporated community and census-designated place (CDP) in Jackson Township, Morgan County, in the U.S. state of Indiana. Its population was 766 as of the 2020 census, up from 677 in 2010. The community is located on the shores of Lake Holiday and Lake Nebo southeast of Martinsville, the Morgan county seat. The two lakes are a combined 196 acres (79 ha) in size.

== Geography ==
Painted Hills is located in southeastern Morgan County. Indiana State Road 252 forms the northeast border of the community, leading northwest 5 miles (8 km) to Martinsville and southeast the same distance to Morgantown.

According to the U.S. Census Bureau, the community has an area of 1.95 square miles (5.05 km^{2}), of which 1.73 square miles (4.48 km^{2}) are land and 0.22 square miles (0.57 km^{2}), or 11.37%, are water. The lakes in the community, shown as Painted Hills Lake and Little Nebo Lake on federal maps, are built on Camp Creek, a south-flowing tributary of Indian Creek, which leads northwest to the White River south of Martinsville.

== Demographics ==
Historical population
Census	Pop.	Note	%±
2010	677		—
2020	766		13.1%
U.S. Decennial Census
