= Brent Waltz =

American politician

Member of the Indiana Senate from the 36th district
- In office 2005–2017
- Preceded by: Larry Borst
- Succeeded by: Jack Sandlin

Johnson County Councilman from the at-large district
- In office 2001–2005 Serving with Keith Wright, Ron West
- Preceded by: Ed Zehr, Charles Littleton
- Succeeded by: Josh McCarty, John L. Price

Personal details
- Born: September 7, 1973 (age 53)
- Party: Republican
- Education: Wabash College
- Profession: Investment banker, politician
- Website: brentwaltz.com

Darryl Brent Waltz Jr. (born September 7, 1973) is an American politician and businessman. He served in the Indiana Senate from 2005 to 2017, representing southern Marion County and northern Johnson County which comprise the 36th Senate District of Indiana following his defeat of Senate Finance Chairman Larry Borst in the May 2004 Republican primary election. His investment banking company, The Baron Group, Inc., specializes in mergers, acquisitions, and capitalization of small to midsize private companies in the transportation and manufacturing industries. In 2016 Waltz announced he would not seek reelection in order to run for Indiana's 9th congressional district being vacated by Congressman Todd Young. Waltz was unsuccessful in this campaign and subsequently indicted for violating federal campaign finance law.

== Early life ==
Waltz was born in Indianapolis, Indiana, on September 7, 1973, to Darryl Brent Waltz Sr. and Geraldine Chaney Waltz. He is an only child. His father was a senior vice president of an Indiana savings and loan. Waltz graduated from Center Grove High School in 1992 as a National Merit Scholar. At 16, he became an Eagle Scout with bronze, silver, and gold palms. After high school, he attended Wabash College where he completed his degree as a history major with a minor in political science in 3 1/2 years.

== Political career ==
Three out of four of Waltz's great-grandfathers held elected office in Indiana and Kentucky. At the age of 26 he was elected an at-large member of the Johnson County Council in 2000. He was elected President of the Johnson County in 2003 and re-election his last year on the council in 2004.

In a political upset, Waltz unseated 36-year incumbent and Senate Finance Committee chairman Larry Borst in the 2004 Republican primary by just 34 votes—6,062 to 6,024. He defeated his Democratic opponent in the November 2004 election and was reelected to a second term in 2008. Subsequently, in 2012 he won re-election for a third term.

Waltz announced he would not seek re-election for his Senate seat in 2016 in order to pursue Indiana's 9th congressional district being vacated by congressman Todd Young.

== Business career ==
In 1995 Waltz founded his investment banking company, The Baron Group, Inc. - named after a company in a Jeffery Archer novel. In 2001 Waltz and two business partners began a logistics and courier company named Velox Express.

== Criminal conviction ==
On September 29, 2020, Waltz was indicted on 5 counts related to violations of federal campaign finance law related to his 2016 campaign. On April 12, 2022, Brent Waltz pleaded guilty to two felony counts, making and receiving conduit contributions and making false statements to the FBI. On August 17, 2022, District Judge James R. Sweeney II sentenced Waltz to ten months in prison in addition to being supervised by the U.S. Probation Office for two years following his release from federal prison and to pay a $40,500 fine.
