= Joe W. Kelly =

United States Air Force general

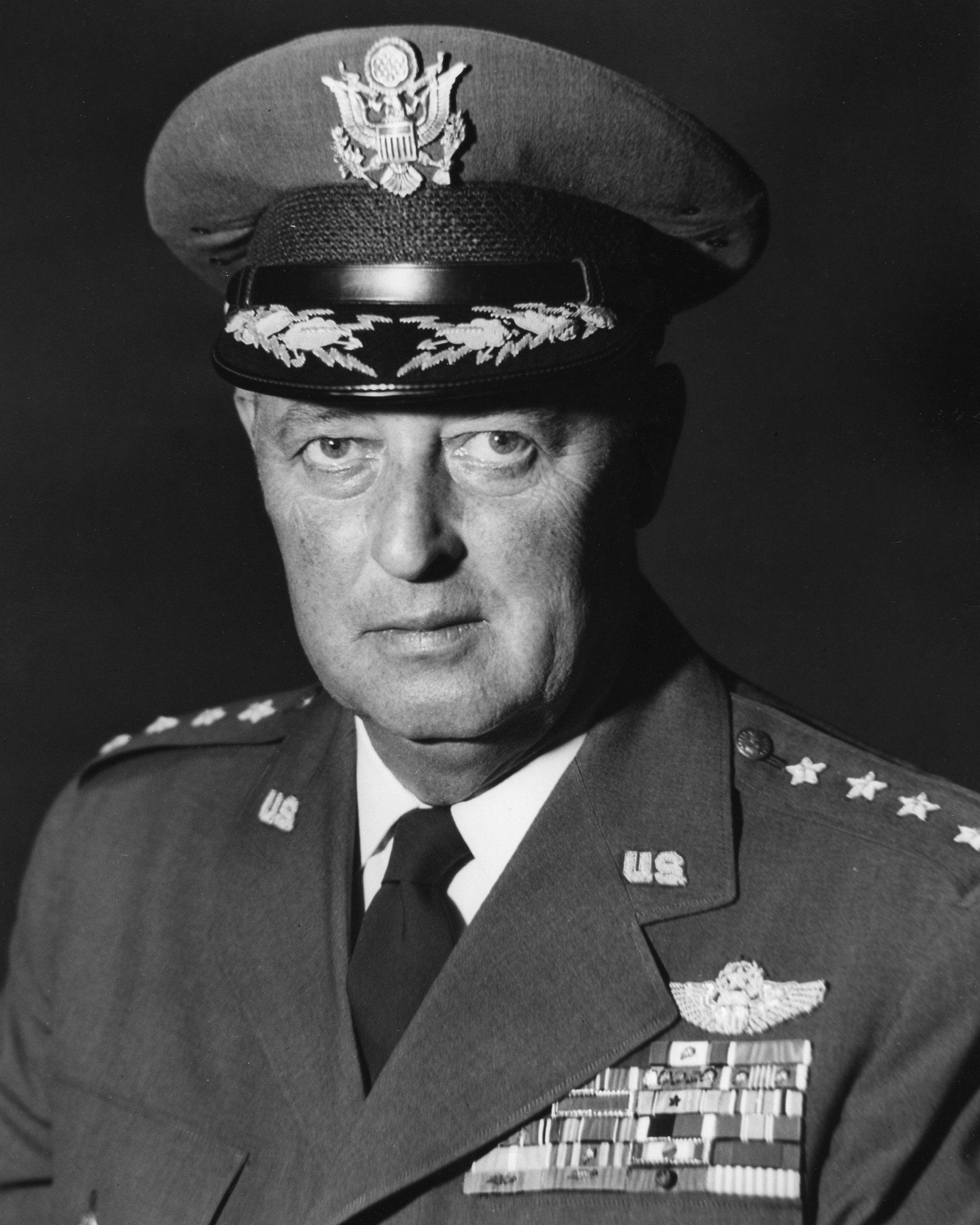
- General Joe W. Kelly
- Born: January 19, 1910; Waverly, Indiana, U.S.
- Died: July 8, 1979 (aged 69); Eglin Air Force Base, Florida, U.S.
- Military career
- Allegiance: United States
- Branch: United States Air Force
- Service years: 1932–1964
- Rank: General
- Commands: Military Air Transport Service
- Conflicts: World War II
- Awards: Distinguished Service Medal (2); Legion of Merit; Distinguished Flying Cross; Air Medal (10)

General Joe William Kelly (January 19, 1910 – July 8, 1979) was a U.S. Air Force general and Commander, Military Air Transport Service (MATS). He was the first four-star commander of MATS, and was commander at the time the command was transitioning to jet aircraft. In 1961 he personally piloted the first jet aircraft assigned to MATS on its maiden voyage from the Boeing factory at Renton, Washington, to MATS Eastern Transport Air Force at McGuire Air Force Base, New Jersey. During Kelly's time as commander, MATS was involved in Operation Deep Freeze, the Cuban Missile Crisis, and the Congo airlift. During his tenure, he compiled nearly 1,700 hours in the air from inspecting units, bringing his service total to nearly 9,700 flying hours.

General Kelly was born in Waverly, Indiana, in 1910. He was graduated from high school in Martinsville, Indiana, in 1927 and attended DePauw University in Greencastle, Indiana, for one year where he became a member of Beta Theta Pi fraternity. In 1928 he entered the United States Military Academy at West Point, New York, and graduated in June 1932 as a second lieutenant in the Infantry.

After completing flying school in 1933, General Kelly was assigned to the 94th Pursuit Squadron at Selfridge Field, Michigan, the same unit to which Captain Eddie Rickenbacker was assigned in World War I. From February to May 1934, General Kelly was an air mail pilot for the Army Air Corps, flying from Newark, New Jersey and Columbus, Ohio. Later he instructed student pilots at Randolph Field, Texas.

Transferred to Santiago, Chile, in 1940, he was a member of the U.S. Military Mission there for three years. He returned to MacDill Field, Florida for six months and in June 1943 was transferred to the European theater. In January 1944, now a full colonel, he became commander of the 386th Bomb Group (Medium), 9th Air Force, a Martin B-26 Marauder medium bomber unit. While under Kelly's command, the group attained the highest record of any B-26 unit in the European theater in number of successful sorties flown, tonnage of bombs dispatched, and enemy aircraft destroyed while at the same time maintaining the highest bombing accuracy score.

Upon General Kelly's departure from the group, he received this commendation from his division commander:

I commend you particularly for your aggressive leadership while commanding the 386th Bombardment Group (M). This aggressive leadership, together with your efficient administration of the group, was directly responsible for its receiving a unit citation awarded for compiling the outstanding record made by any medium bombardment group during its first year of operations in this theater.

General Kelly remained in Europe in command and staff positions until December 1944 when he returned to West Point as director of aviation.

He enrolled in the Air War College at Maxwell Air Force Base, Alabama in the summer of 1946. After graduation, he was an instructor and then chief of Plans and Operations Division.

In January 1948, he began a 5½ year association with the Strategic Air Command, commanding various SAC bomber units including the Far East Air Forces Bomber Command at Yokota Air Base, Japan, and serving as the commanding general of 19th Air Division at Carswell AFB, Texas.

In 1953, he was assigned to the Office of the Secretary of the Air Force, Washington, D.C., as director of Legislative Liaison. In this position he was responsible for development of public laws affecting the Air Force and for furthering Air Force relations with Congress. For his exceptional service in this position, General Kelly was awarded an oak leaf cluster to the Distinguished Service Medal by Secretary of the Air Force James Douglas.

On July 21, 1958, General Kelly assumed command of the Air Proving Ground Center at Eglin Air Force Base, Florida, his final assignment before taking command of MATS. He retired on July 18, 1964. Kelly died on July 8, 1979, at Eglin Air Force Base and was buried in Barrancas National Cemetery in Pensacola, Florida.

For his interest in and support of the Air Reserve Forces, General Kelly was chosen for the "Minuteman Hall of Fame" award for 1962 by the Reserve Officers Association.

== Awards and decorations ==
In addition to the Distinguished Service Medal, General Kelly's other decorations include, the Legion of Merit, the Distinguished Flying Cross, the Air Medal with nine oak leaf clusters, the Belgian and French Croix de Guerre, the British Distinguished Service Order, the Chilean Legion of Merit, the Army Commendation Ribbon and other unit, campaign and service awards

== Effective dates of promotion ==
Insignia	Rank	Date
	General	June 6, 1963
	Lieutenant general	June 1, 1960
	Major general	March 10, 1958
	Brigadier general	March 21, 1951
	Colonel	July 8, 1943
	Lieutenant colonel	January 23, 1942
	Major	July 15, 1941
	Captain	September 9, 1940
	First lieutenant	April 20, 1935
	Second lieutenant	June 10, 1932
