= Old Bargersville, Indiana =

- Unincorporated community
- Location within Indiana Location within the United States
- Coordinates: 39°31′03″N 86°09′21″W
- Country: United States
- State: Indiana
- County: Johnson
- Township: Union
- Elevation: 827 ft (252 m)
- ZIP code: 46131
- FIPS code: 18-56250
- GNIS feature ID: 440531

Old Bargersville is an unincorporated community in Union Township, Johnson County, Indiana.

== History ==
This community was platted as Bargersville in 1850 by Jefferson Barger, and named for him. When Bargersville, Indiana, was established, the town's name was changed to Old Bargersville.
