= Franklin Community High School =

School in Franklin, Indiana, United States

Location
- 2600 Cumberland Drive; Franklin, Indiana, Johnson County, Indiana 46131; United States; 39°30′42″N 86°5′15″W

Information
- Type: Public high school
- Motto: Student-Centered...Innovative
- Established: 8 February 1871
- School district: Franklin Community School Corporation
- CEEB code: 151175
- NCES School ID: 180369000581
- Principal: Ryan Wagner
- Teaching staff: 85.50 (FTE)
- Grades: 9-12
- Enrollment: 1,590 (2023-2024)
- Student to teacher ratio: 18.60
- Campus type: Suburban
- Colors: Blue and black
- Athletics conference: Mid-State
- Team name: Grizzly Cubs
- Website: franklinschools.org/franklin-community-high-school

Franklin Community High School is a community high school based in Franklin, Indiana. It is a part of Franklin Community Schools.

It serves almost all of Franklin and a small section of Bargersville.

== About ==
Franklin Community High School was established on February 8, 1871, in a building located at Water and Adams Streets. Its current facilities were built in 2007. As of the 2023–2024 school year, the school has an enrollment of 1,590 students.

== Athletics ==
The school's athletic teams are named the Grizzly Cubs and the school's colors are blue and white. The school offers 12 boys sports:

- Cross Country
- Football
- Soccer
- Tennis
- Basketball
- Swimming and Diving
- Wrestling
- Baseball
- Golf
- Track and Field
- Volleyball
- Lacrosse

and 12 girls sports:

- Softball
- Tennis
- Track and Field
- Volleyball
- Basketball
- Swimming and Diving
- Cross Country
- Golf
- Soccer
- Cheer
- Wrestling
- Lacrosse

Their teams compete in the Mid-State Conference of the Indiana High School Athletic Association.

Boys Basketball won the state championship in 1920, 1921 and 1922. Boys Golf won state in 1938. Boys Cross-Country won state in 2001.

The Franklin High School sports teams finished runner-up in state: 1912 and 1939 Boys Basketball, 1998 and 2022 Girls Basketball, 1974 Boys Golf, 1983 and 1997 Girls Golf, 2018 and 2019 Boys Swimming, 2019 Girls Swimming and 2014 Boy Wrestling.

== Competitive Academics ==
Franklin Community High School offers 7 competitive academic teams with 6 of those competing in competitions organized by the Indiana Association of School Principals, such as:

- Social Studies
- English
- Science
- Mathematics
- Fine Arts
- Spelling

The school also offers an ethics bowl team that competes in an event organized by the Prindle Institute for Ethics, a Greencastle based ethics school.

In 2012, the program earned its first state championship, as the English team secured 3rd place at Area, an all-region competition, and won the state championship in English later in May.

== Notable alumni ==
- Max Clark (baseball) (class of 2023), First round pick by the Tigers (3rd overall) in the 2023 draft, made his MLB debut on July 31, 2026
- Michelle Davis, politician
- George Crowe (class of 1939), Indiana's first Mr. Basketball, professional baseball player.
- "Fuzzy" Vandivier was the leading scorer for the Franklin Wonder Five that won the Indiana State Basketball Championship three straight years, 1920–1922.
- Roger Branigin (class of 1919), was Indiana's 42nd governor.

== See also ==
- List of high schools in Indiana
