= Harrison Township, Indiana =

Harrison Township is the name of twenty-four townships in the U.S. state of Indiana:

- Harrison Township, Bartholomew County, Indiana
- Harrison Township, Blackford County, Indiana
- Harrison Township, Boone County, Indiana
- Harrison Township, Cass County, Indiana
- Harrison Township, Clay County, Indiana
- Harrison Township, Daviess County, Indiana
- Harrison Township, Dearborn County, Indiana
- Harrison Township, Delaware County, Indiana
- Harrison Township, Elkhart County, Indiana
- Harrison Township, Fayette County, Indiana
- Harrison Township, Harrison County, Indiana
- Harrison Township, Henry County, Indiana
- Harrison Township, Howard County, Indiana
- Harrison Township, Knox County, Indiana
- Harrison Township, Kosciusko County, Indiana
- Harrison Township, Miami County, Indiana
- Harrison Township, Morgan County, Indiana
- Harrison Township, Owen County, Indiana
- Harrison Township, Pulaski County, Indiana
- Harrison Township, Spencer County, Indiana
- Harrison Township, Union County, Indiana
- Harrison Township, Vigo County, Indiana
- Harrison Township, Wayne County, Indiana
- Harrison Township, Wells County, Indiana
