= Cedar Point Farm =

- U.S. National Register of Historic Places
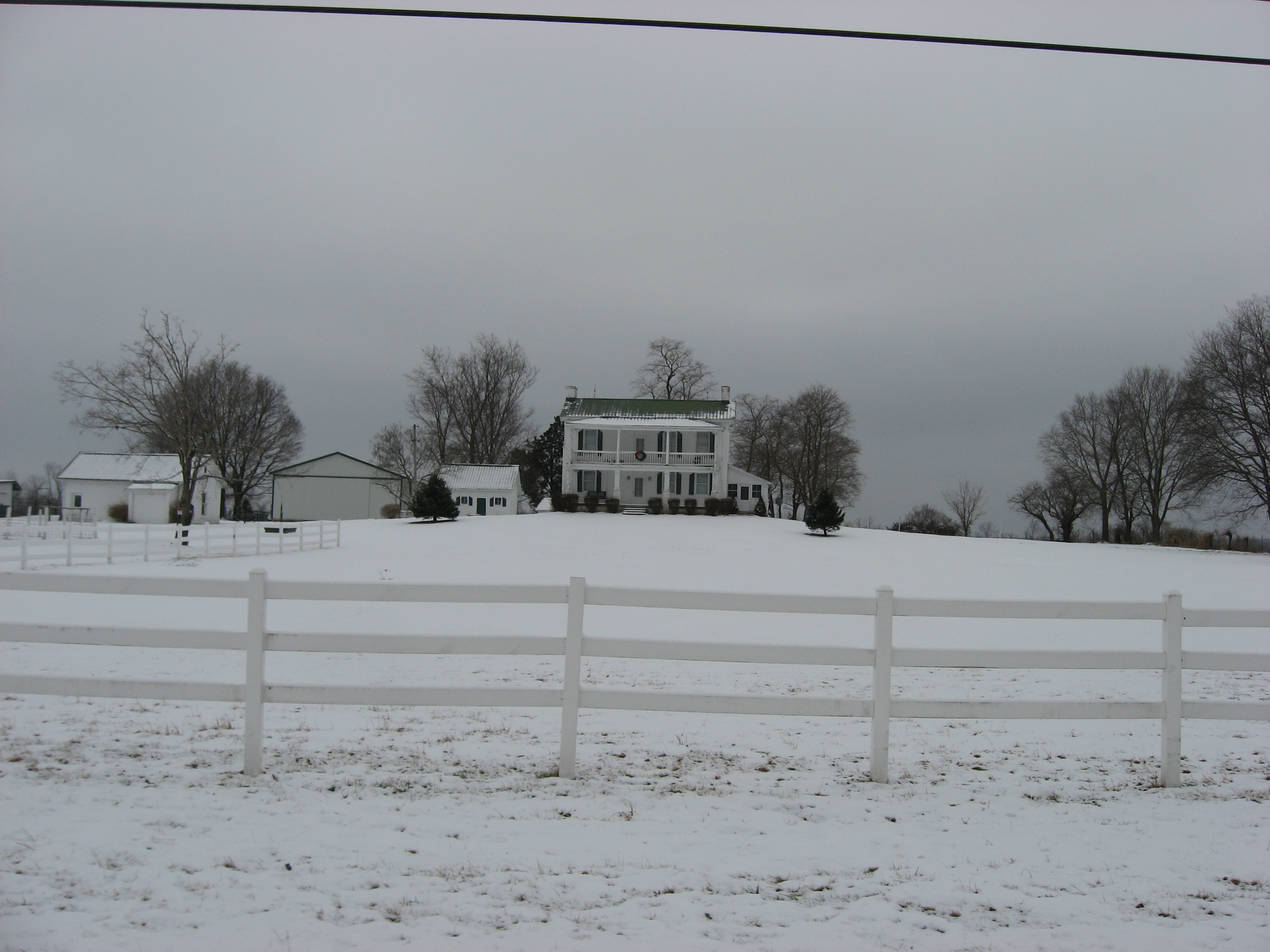
- Cedar Point Farm, January 2011

- Location within Indiana Location within the United States
- Location: 8185 E. State Road 252, west of Morgantown in Jackson Township, Morgan County, Indiana
- Coordinates: 39°22′14″N 86°16′47″W
- Area: 210 acres (85 ha)
- Built: 1853
- Architectural style: Greek Revival
- NRHP reference No.: 03000148
- Added to NRHP: March 26, 2003

Cedar Point Farm is a historic home and farm located in Jackson Township, Morgan County, Indiana. The farmhouse was built in 1853, and is a two-story, Greek Revival style brick I-house with a side gable roof. It features a two-story, full-width front porch. Also on the property are the contributing summer house / summer kitchen, woodshed / smokehouse, English barn, cattle / tromp shed, double corn crib, tractor shed, garage, granary with sheds, privy, hen house, dog house, a wind mill pump, and two hand water pumps.

It was listed on the National Register of Historic Places in 2003.
