= Center Grove, Indiana =

Unincorporated community in Indiana, U.S.

Coordinates: 39.577346°N 86.19706°W

Center Grove is an unincorporated community located in White River Township, Johnson County, Indiana. The area gained its name from the Center Grove Community School Corporation.

== History ==
During the 2000 United States census, unincorporated White River Township accounted for 35,539 citizens (93% urban, 7% rural).

- Estimated median household income in 2008: $79,660 ($69,033 in 1999)
- Estimated median house or condo value in 2008: $199,602 (it was $149,800 in 2000)
- Population density: 754 inhabitants per square mile (291/km^{2})
- Residents with income below 50% of the poverty level in 2008: 1.5%

In 2008, a panel was formed by the neighboring city of Greenwood, Indiana and selected residents from White River Township to evaluate the possibility of merging the area into the established corporate limits of Greenwood. Discussions of the proposed merger raised concerns with the southern town of Bargersville, Indiana who disputed elements of the Greenwood proposed merger plan for contested areas targeted for future annexation (generally select property north of the Bargersville town limits.)

The measure has yet to reach public ballot. Additionally, there are public accounts of current Greenwood City Mayor, Charles Henderson, losing interest in making the White River Township merger a continued city campaign. Despite repeated attempts by the town of Bargersville to continue its northward annexation, the current White River Township Board Members / Trustee have yet to declare their views of what the future of the area may be.

On January 4, 2011, the elected members of the White River Township (WRT) board took the first official action of public office to vote and reject the merger plan previously approved by the former WRT board members. The White River Township board members include Greg Rainbolt, Peggy Young, and Dave Pollard. During a board meeting held on January 4, 2011, Board Chairman Greg Rainbolt stated his desire to have serious discussions involving the future of the unincorporated Center Grove community, to include the feasibility of the Center Grove area studying the viability of becoming a town in the state of Indiana.

=== City of Greenwood, Indiana - The Proposed Merger ===
Many publications from the Greenwood Committee and White River Township board have been produced, voted on, challenged, re-produced, re-voted, and re-challenged by residents of Greenwood, unincorporated White River Township, and Bargersville. One reason for the City of Greenwood interests in unincorporated White River Township is based in part on the city's campaign to become a 'second class' city within the State of Indiana, as well as expanding its residential tax base to aid with the city's growing public debt.

Despite opposition from local residents of Greenwood, the city council's campaign for the City of Greenwood to become a second class city in the State of Indiana occurred without the proposed merger with White River Township ever being brought to public ballot.

The proposed merger technically may be considered as part of the public ballot slated for November 2012, but must obtain approval from the Johnson County Election Board before it can be placed before the public.

=== Town of Bargersville, Indiana - The Annexation Approach ===
The town of Bargersville, Indiana has been one of the chief opponents to the city of Greenwood, Indiana's campaign to reach a 'second class' city status through the proposed merger with unincorporated White River Township, as specified by the Indiana State Code. While both governmental entities have pushed their boundaries through extended utility services into unincorporated White River Township, the town of Bargersville has also made significant plays for landowners that share its northern town border through the annexation process. There have been some questions raised regarding Bargersville's legal authority to initiate annexations as their legal status as a town differs from that of a city. Greenwood's Mayor, Charles Henderson, has publicly expressed this concern, but after several rounds through state appellate courts, the issue will be resolved through the Indiana Supreme Court for the final decision regarding Bargersville's annexation filings.

== Incorporation of Center Grove ==
Within the land battle of unincorporated White River Township between the City of Greenwood and the Town of Bargersville, a number of WRT citizens have asked if the public incorporation of 'Center Grove' has been considered to be fiscally beneficial to taxpayers and to the providers of public services. A non-profit group known as 'Citizens for Center Grove' publicly filed its formation with the State of Indiana and was approved by the Secretary of State, Todd Rokita, on September 30, 2010, and received a formal signature of approval on October 1, 2010.
