= Center Grove High School =

Location
- 2717 South Morgantown Road; Greenwood, Johnson County, Indiana 46143; United States; 39°34′33″N 86°11′43″W

Information
- Type: Public high school
- Established: 1884
- School district: Center Grove Community School Corporation
- Principal: Tracy McMahen
- Teaching staff: 144.00 (FTE)
- Grades: 9-12
- Enrollment: 2,893 (2023–2024)
- Student to teacher ratio: 20.09
- Colors: Red and White
- Athletics conference: Independent
- Team name: Trojans
- Newspaper: The Trojaneer
- Website: Official Website

Center Grove High School is a high school located in Greenwood, Indiana. A part of Center Grove Community School Corporation, it serves western Greenwood and most of Bargersville. Founded in 1884, the high school has always been located at the same intersection in White River Township, Johnson County, Indiana.

== Athletics ==
The Center Grove Trojans compete as an independent, with no conference affiliation. This comes after decades in the Metropolitan Interscholastic Conference, in which they were voted out of the conference in 2021 due to a failed attempt to join the Hoosier Crossroads Conference. They will rejoin the Metropolitan Interscholastic Conference as of the 2026–2027 season. The school colors are red and white. They have won 22 state championships.

IHSAA State Championships
Sport	Year(s)
Girls Basketball (2)	1996, 2026
Football (5)	2008, 2015, 2020, 2021, 2022
Boys Golf (2)	2017, 2021
Boys Soccer (1)	2015
Softball (7)	1986, 1995, 1998, 2003, 2009, 2015, 2019
Boys Tennis (2)	2001, 2008
Boys Track and Field (1)	2011
Girls Volleyball (1)	2000
Boys Wrestling (1)	2026

== Demographics ==
The demographic breakdown of the 2,851 students enrolled in 2022–2023 was as follows:

- Male - 50.1%
- Female - 49.9%
- American Indian/Alaskan Native - 0.1%
- Asian - 6.3%
- Black - 3.6%
- Hispanic - 5.8%
- White - 81.3%
- Multiracial - 2.9%

24.1% of the students were eligible for free or reduced lunch.

== Fine arts ==
Center Grove has numerous vocal and instrumental music groups in addition to a theatre program.

The Center Grove High School marching band won first place at the 1995 Bands of America Grand National Finals.

Center Grove High School's varsity competition show choirs, "Sound System" and "Debtones" (mixed and unisex, respectively) have both won several national competitions and are critically acclaimed across the country, typically ranking within the top 10-15 groups in the country in their respective divisions; both groups swept their divisions at Show Choir Nationals in 2024 at the Grand Ole Opry, and Sound System was named showchoir.com's Show Choir of Year in 2024.

== Notable alumni ==
- Shamar Bailey- Mixed Martial Arts Fighter
- Austin Booker - NFL defensive end for the Chicago Bears
- Caden Curry - college football defensive end for the Ohio State Buckeyes
- Dominique Elliott - Former professional basketball player
- Aaron Halterman - Former NFL tight end
- Tayven Jackson - college football quarterback for the Tennessee Volunteers, the Indiana Hoosiers the UCF Knights, and the North Texas Mean Green
- Trayce Jackson-Davis - Indiana Basketball player and forward, who was drafted for the Golden State Warriors and currently plays for the Toronto Raptors.
- Dave Kneebone - Film and television producer, Abso Lutely Productions
- Brad Long - Actor
- Michelle McKeehan - American Swimmer
- Brienne Pedigo-Christopher - Reporter, ESPN
- Carson Steele - NFL running back for the Philadelphia Eagles and the UCLA Bruins
- Aaron Waltke - Emmy Award-winning screenwriter
- Brent Waltz - Member of the Indiana Senate
- Linda Faye Williams - Political scientist
- Nate Wozniak - Former NFL offensive tackle
- Russ Yeast - NFL safety for the Los Angeles Rams

== See also ==
- List of high schools in Indiana
