= 1992 Senior League World Series =

American youth baseball tournament

Tournament information
- Location: Kissimmee, Florida
- Dates: August 16–22, 1992

Final positions
- Champions: Pingtung, Taiwan
- Runner-up: Santo Domingo, Dominican Republic

The 1992 Senior League World Series took place from August 16–22 in Kissimmee, Florida, United States. Pingtung, Taiwan defeated Santo Domingo, Dominican Republic in the championship game. It was Taiwan's fifth straight championship, and 17th overall.

== Teams ==
United States	International
(Florida) Pine Castle, Florida; District 3 Host	Surrey, British Columbia Canada
Center Grove, Indiana Central	Ramstein, Germany Europe
(New Jersey) Asbury Park, New Jersey East	(Taiwan) Pingtung, Taiwan Far East
(Texas) San Antonio, Texas South	Santo Domingo, Dominican Republic Latin America
(California) Torrance, California West	

== Results ==
Winner's Bracket

Opening Game
—	Florida	12
—	Germany	1

—
1–0	Florida	2
—	Canada	3
—	Indiana	7
—	New Jersey	6
—	Taiwan	2
—	California	0
—	Dominican Republic	2
—	Texas	0

—
1–0	Canada	3
1–0	Indiana	4
1–0	Taiwan	7
1–0	Dominican Republic	2

Bracket Final
2–0	Indiana	3
2–0	Taiwan	15

Loser's Bracket

—
0–1	New Jersey
0–1	California
0–1	Germany
1–1	Florida

—
0–1	Texas (F/8)	6
2–1	Florida	5
1–1	Dominican Republic
1–1	California

—
1–1	Canada	13
1–1	Texas	4
2–1	Indiana	2
2–1	Dominican Republic	11

Bracket Final
2–1	Canada	1
3–1	Dominican Republic	10

Placement Bracket

—
0–2	New Jersey	3
0–2	Germany	2

—
1–2	California	3
1–2	New Jersey	2
1–2	Texas (F/8)	8
2–2	Florida	7

—
2–2	Indiana	7
2–2	California	10
2–2	Canada	4
2–2	Texas	17

Third Place Game
3–2	California	10
3–2	Texas	4

Elimination Round

Semifinals
2–0	Indiana	3
2–0	Taiwan	15
2–1	Canada	1
3–1	Dominican Republic	10

World Championship
3–0	Taiwan	1 · 8
4–1	Dominican Republic	6 · 1
Third Place Game
3–2	California	10
3–2	Texas	4

1992 Senior League World Series Champions
Pingtung, Taiwan
