= Prince's Lakes, Indiana =

- Town
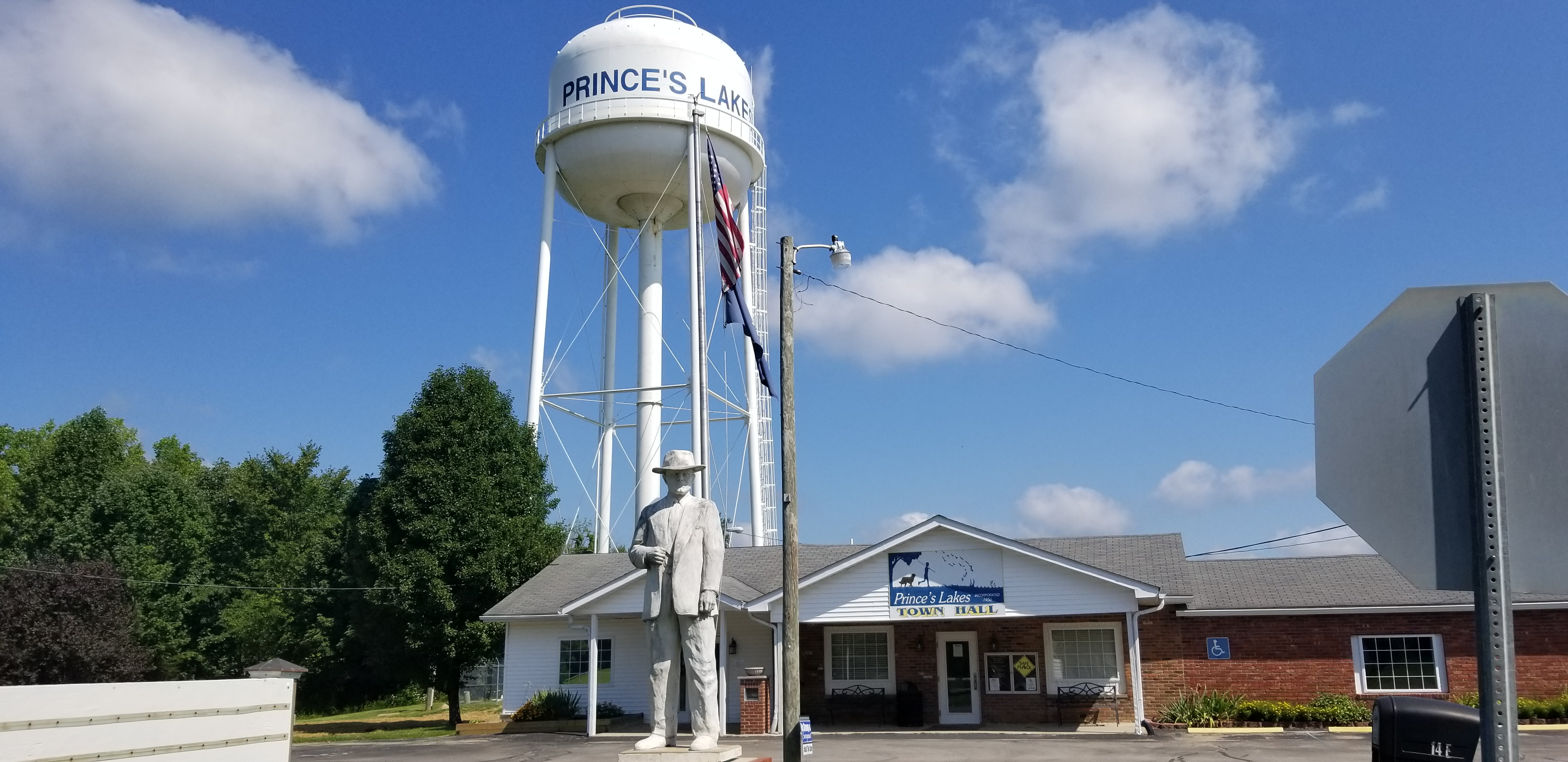
- Prince's Lakes water tower and town hall

- Seal

- Location of Prince's Lakes in Johnson County, Indiana.
- Coordinates: 39°21′17″N 86°07′12″W
- Country: United States
- State: Indiana
- County: Johnson
- Township: Nineveh
- Incorporated: 1956

Area
  - Total: 1.51 sq mi (3.90 km^{2})
  - Land: 1.34 sq mi (3.46 km^{2})
  - Water: 0.17 sq mi (0.44 km^{2})
- Elevation: 827 ft (252 m)

Population (2020)
  - Total: 1,372
  - Density: 1,026.2/sq mi (396.22/km^{2})
- Time zone: UTC-5 (Eastern (EST))
  - Summer (DST): UTC-4 (EDT)
- FIPS code: 18-62028
- GNIS feature ID: 2396867
- Website: princeslakes.in.gov

Prince's Lakes is a town in Nineveh Township, Johnson County, Indiana, United States. As of the 2020 census, Prince's Lakes had a population of 1,372.

== History ==
Prince's Lakes was incorporated as a town in 1956. It took its name from four lakes in the area, each of which contains Prince's in its name.

== Geography ==
According to the 2010 census, Prince's Lakes has a total area of 1.52 square miles (3.94 km^{2}), of which 1.35 square miles (3.50 km^{2}) (or 88.82%) is land and 0.17 square miles (0.44 km^{2}) (or 11.18%) is water.

== Demographics ==
Historical population
Census	Pop.	Note	%±
1960	374		—
1970	597		59.6%
1980	937		57.0%
1990	1,055		12.6%
2000	1,506		42.7%
2010	1,312		−12.9%
2020	1,372		4.6%
U.S. Decennial Census

=== 2020 census ===
As of the 2020 census, Prince's Lakes had a population of 1,372. The median age was 49.4 years. 16.5% of residents were under the age of 18 and 19.3% of residents were 65 years of age or older. For every 100 females there were 100.0 males, and for every 100 females age 18 and over there were 102.5 males age 18 and over.

0.0% of residents lived in urban areas, while 100.0% lived in rural areas.

There were 580 households in Prince's Lakes, of which 25.2% had children under the age of 18 living in them. Of all households, 55.7% were married-couple households, 20.0% were households with a male householder and no spouse or partner present, and 15.7% were households with a female householder and no spouse or partner present. About 24.7% of all households were made up of individuals and 9.7% had someone living alone who was 65 years of age or older.

There were 757 housing units, of which 23.4% were vacant. The homeowner vacancy rate was 2.3% and the rental vacancy rate was 9.0%.

Racial composition as of the 2020 census
Race	Number	Percent
White	1,283	93.5%
Black or African American	2	0.1%
American Indian and Alaska Native	0	0.0%
Asian	10	0.7%
Native Hawaiian and Other Pacific Islander	3	0.2%
Some other race	3	0.2%
Two or more races	71	5.2%
Hispanic or Latino (of any race)	22	1.6%

=== 2010 census ===
As of the census of 2010, there were 1,312 people, 528 households, and 369 families living in the town. The population density was 971.9 inhabitants per square mile (375.3/km^{2}). There were 773 housing units at an average density of 572.6 per square mile (221.1/km^{2}). The racial makeup of the town was 98.8% White, 0.2% African American, 0.4% Native American, 0.3% Asian, 0.1% from other races, and 0.3% from two or more races. Hispanic or Latino of any race were 0.9% of the population.

There were 528 households, of which 31.3% had children under the age of 18 living with them, 57.0% were married couples living together, 8.3% had a female householder with no husband present, 4.5% had a male householder with no wife present, and 30.1% were non-families. 23.9% of all households were made up of individuals, and 6.5% had someone living alone who was 65 years of age or older. The average household size was 2.48 and the average family size was 2.94.

The median age in the town was 42.5 years. 23% of residents were under the age of 18; 6.7% were between the ages of 18 and 24; 24.8% were from 25 to 44; 34.5% were from 45 to 64; and 11% were 65 years of age or older. The gender makeup of the town was 48.5% male and 51.5% female.

=== 2000 census ===
As of the census of 2000, there were 1,506 people, 597 households, and 434 families living in the town. The population density was 1,175.3 inhabitants per square mile (453.8/km^{2}). There were 695 housing units at an average density of 542.4 per square mile (209.4/km^{2}). The racial makeup of the town was 98.94% White, 0.27% African American, 0.07% Native American, 0.27% Asian, 0.07% from other races, and 0.40% from two or more races. Hispanic or Latino of any race were 1.06% of the population.

There were 597 households, out of which 32.7% had children under the age of 18 living with them, 63.5% were married couples living together, 5.7% had a female householder with no husband present, and 27.3% were non-families. 21.1% of all households were made up of individuals, and 8.5% had someone living alone who was 65 years of age or older. The average household size was 2.52 and the average family size was 2.94.

In the town, the population was spread out, with 25.0% under the age of 18, 5.2% from 18 to 24, 32.1% from 25 to 44, 26.9% from 45 to 64, and 10.8% who were 65 years of age or older. The median age was 39 years. For every 100 females, there were 97.6 males. For every 100 females age 18 and over, there were 96.0 males.

The median income for a household in the town was $46,339, and the median income for a family was $49,236. Males had a median income of $36,417 versus $25,000 for females. The per capita income for the town was $19,378. About 2.4% of families and 6.2% of the population were below the poverty line, including 6.0% of those under age 18 and 8.6% of those age 65 or over.

== Education ==
Residents are served by the Nineveh-Hensley-Jackson United School Corporation, including Indian Creek Senior High School.
