= 1993 Senior League World Series =

American youth baseball tournament

Tournament information
- Location: Kissimmee, Florida
- Dates: August 15–21, 1993

Final positions
- Champions: La Vega, Dominican Republic
- Runner-up: Taipei, Taiwan

The 1993 Senior League World Series took place from August 15–21 in Kissimmee, Florida, United States. La Vega, Dominican Republic defeated Taipei, Taiwan twice in the championship game.

== Teams ==
United States	International
(Florida) Azalea Park, Florida; District 3 Host	Calgary, Alberta Canada
Center Grove, Indiana Central	Dhahran, Saudi Arabia Europe
(Pennsylvania) Shippensburg, Pennsylvania East	(Taiwan) Taipei, Taiwan Far East
(Alabama) Mobile, Alabama South	La Vega, Dominican Republic Latin America
(Nevada) Henderson, Nevada West	

== Results ==
=== Winner's Bracket ===
Opening Game
—	Pennsylvania	7
—	Florida	6

—
1–0	Pennsylvania	7
—	Alabama	2
—	Indiana	8
—	Canada	4
—	Taiwan	13
—	Saudi Arabia	0
—	Dominican Republic	1
—	Nevada	0

—
2–0	Pennsylvania	11
1–0	Indiana	0
1–0	Taiwan	6
1–0	Dominican Republic	1

Bracket Final
3–0	Pennsylvania	3
2–0	Taiwan	24

=== Loser's Bracket ===
—
0–1	Nevada	1
0–1	Canada	8
0–1	Saudi Arabia	0
0–1	Florida	7

—
0–1	Alabama	4
1–1	Florida	10
1–1	Dominican Republic	5
1–1	Canada	1

—
1–1	Indiana	5
2–1	Florida	4
3–1	Pennsylvania	2
2–1	Dominican Republic	3

Bracket Final
2–1	Indiana	0
3–1	Dominican Republic	4

=== Placement Bracket ===
—
0–2	Nevada	23
0–2	Saudi Arabia	8

—
1–2	Canada	0
1–2	Nevada	15
0–2	Alabama	6
2–2	Florida	4

—
3–2	Pennsylvania	1
2–2	Nevada	5
2–2	Indiana	4
1–2	Alabama	2

Third-place game
3–2	Nevada	15
3–2	Indiana	2

=== Elimination Round ===
Semifinals
3–0	Pennsylvania	3
2–0	Taiwan	24
2–1	Indiana	0
3–1	Dominican Republic	4

World championship
3–0	Taiwan	1 · 3
4–1	Dominican Republic	3 · 7
Third-place game
3–2	Nevada	15
3–2	Indiana	2

1993 Senior League World Series Champions
La Vega, Dominican Republic
