= Stones Crossing, Indiana =

Unincorporated community in Indiana, U.S.

Coordinates: 39°34′40″N 86°09′33″W

Stones Crossing is an unincorporated community in Johnson County, Indiana, in the United States.

== History ==
A post office was established at Stones Crossing in 1874, and remained in operation until it was discontinued in 1905. The community was named in honor of the Stone family of residents.
