= Waverly, Indiana =

- Census-designated place
- Location within Indiana Location within the United States
- Coordinates: 39°33′11″N 86°15′56″W
- Country: United States
- State: Indiana
- County: Morgan
- Township: Harrison

Area
  - Total: 1.52 sq mi (3.9 km^{2})
  - Land: 1.52 sq mi (3.9 km^{2})
  - Water: 0.0 sq mi (0 km^{2})
- Elevation: 745 ft (227 m)
- Time zone: UTC-5 (Eastern (EST))
  - Summer (DST): UTC-4 (EDT)
- ZIP code: 46151 (Martinsville)
- FIPS code: 18-81494
- GNIS feature ID: 2830474

Waverly is an unincorporated community and census-designated place (CDP) in Harrison Township, Morgan County, in the U.S. state of Indiana.

== History ==
Waverly had its start about 1837 by the building of the canal through that territory. At one time, Waverly was one of two sites in the running to become Indiana's state capital. A post office was established at Waverly in 1862, and remained in operation until it was discontinued in 1927. Located alongside the White River, the Waverly community has suffered severe flooding, most recently in 2008. Much of the area was then purchased by Morgan County for recreational purposes. Old Town Waverly Park is now open on the original site of the village of Waverly. The Waverly Bank building has been retained and restored to act as a museum of sorts, and a traditional arts area is available for demonstrations of blacksmithing, tinsmithing and other traditional arts. A paved, two mile riverwalk trail for pedestrian and bicycle use follows the river.

== Geography ==
Waverly is located in northeastern Morgan County. It is bordered to the east by the town of Bargersville in Johnson County. The White River forms the northern border of the community, while Interstate 69 forms the southeast border, with the nearest highway access being Exit 153, 1 mile (1.6 km) to the northeast. I-69 leads southwest 14 miles (23 km) to Martinsville, the Morgan county seat, and northeast 16 miles (26 km) to Indianapolis.

According to the U.S. Census Bureau, the Waverly CDP has a total area of 1.52 square miles (3.94 km^{2}), of which 0.002 square miles (0.005 km^{2}), or 0.13%, are water.

== Demographics ==
Historical population
| Census | Pop. | Note | %± |
|---|---|---|---|
| 2023 (est.) | 1,006 |

The United States Census Bureau defined Waverly as a census designated place in the 2022 American Community Survey.
