= Elm Spring Farm =

- U.S. National Register of Historic Places
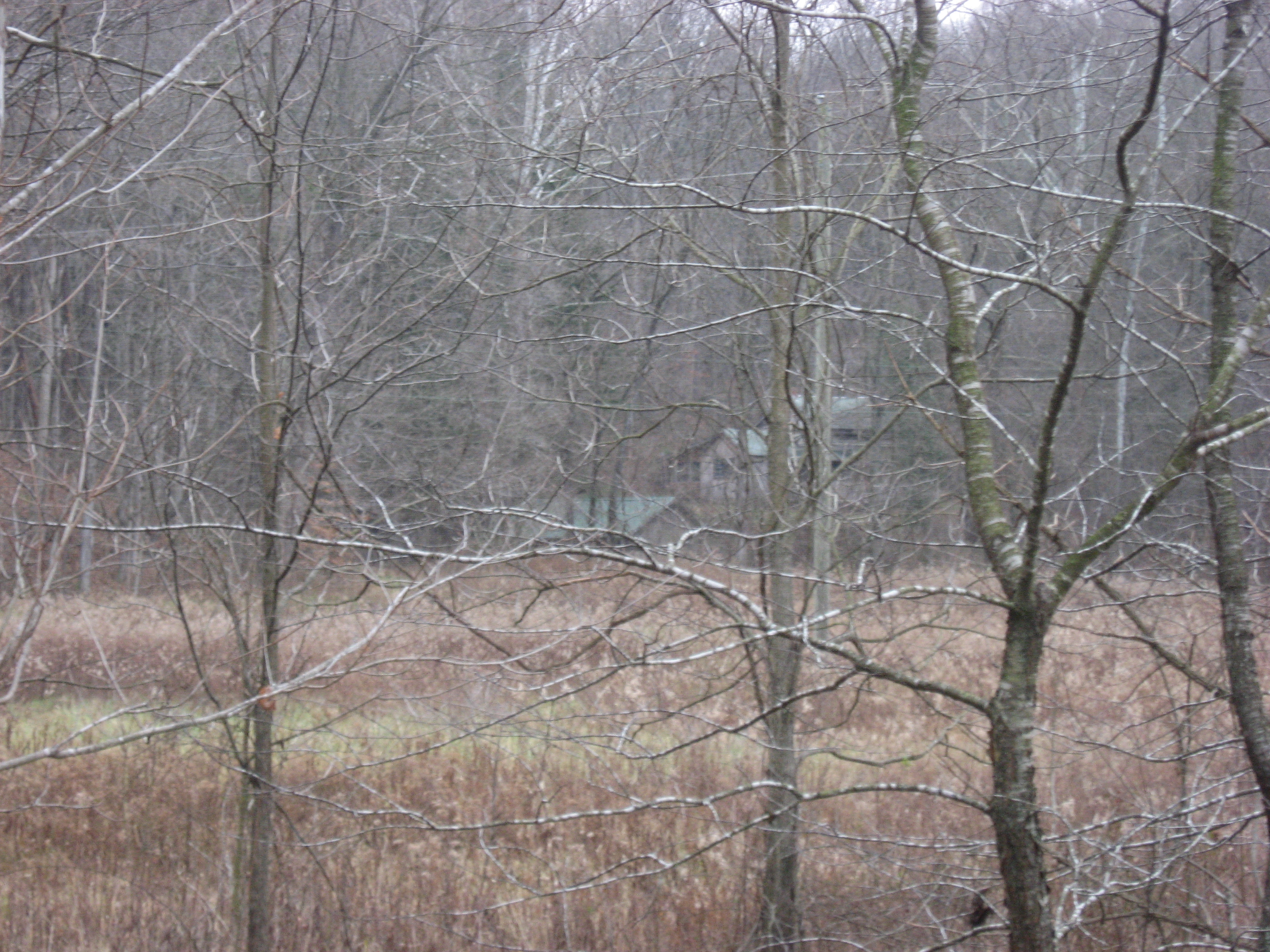
- Elm Spring Farm fields, December 2011

- Location within Indiana Location within the United States
- Location: 1 mile (1.6 km) north of Bain Rd. on Goose Creek Rd., northwest of Morgantown in Jefferson Township, Morgan County, Indiana
- Coordinates: 39°27′22″N 86°28′13″W
- Area: 50 acres (20 ha)
- Built: c. 1844
- Built by: Civilian Conservation Corps
- Architectural style: Log
- NRHP reference No.: 01000981
- Added to NRHP: September 16, 2001

Elm Spring Farm is a historic home and farm located in Jefferson Township, Morgan County, Indiana. The farmhouse was built about 1844, and is a 1 1/2-story, single pen log dwelling with a frame kitchen addition. Also on the property are the contributing single corn crib converted to a garage, second single corn crib, privy, brick outdoor fireplace, spring, and sandstone abutments for two absent foot bridges. The building represents an assemblage of pioneer log buildings. During the 1930s, the Civilian Conservation Corps was hired to reforest the farm. The property has also been used as a Girl Scout camp.

It was listed on the National Register of Historic Places in 2001.
