= Morgantown Historic District (Morgantown, Indiana) =

Historic district in Indiana, United States

- U.S. National Register of Historic Places
- U.S. Historic district
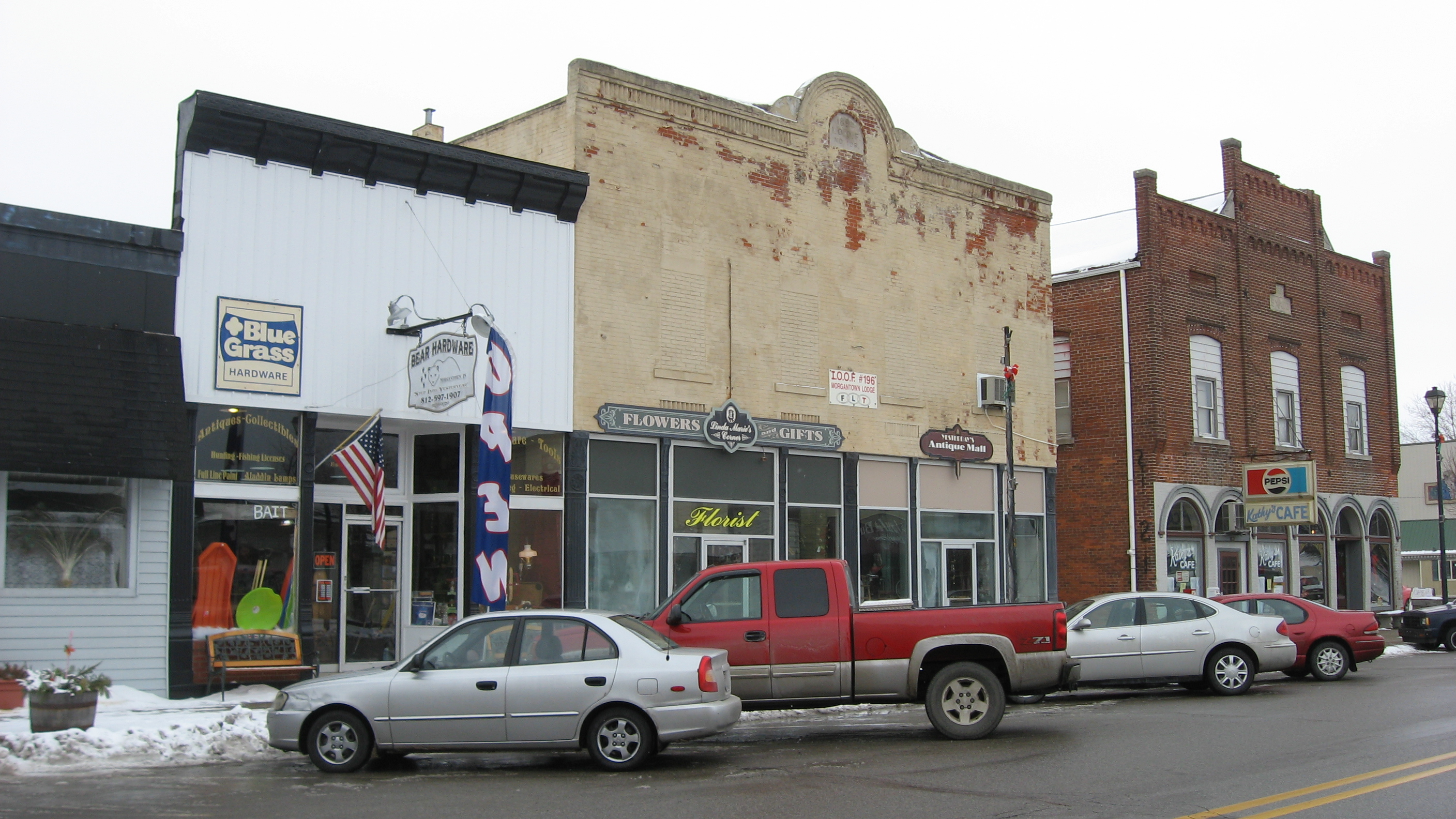
- Businesses in the Morgantown Historic District, January 2011

- Location within Indiana Location within the United States
- Location: Approx. 4.5 blocks centered on Washington St., bet. Marion St. and E of Church St., Morgantown, Indiana
- Coordinates: 39°22′24″N 86°15′40″W
- Area: 9 acres (3.6 ha)
- Architect: Mesker, George L. & Co.; Stockton, Thomas
- Architectural style: Greek Revival, Italianate, et al.
- NRHP reference No.: 06000519
- Added to NRHP: June 21, 2006

Morgantown Historic District is a national historic district located at Morgantown, Indiana. The district encompasses 34 contributing buildings in the central business district and surrounding residential sections of Morgantown. It developed between about 1840 and 1956, and includes notable examples of Greek Revival, Italianate, Late Gothic Revival, Queen Anne, and Bungalow/American Craftsman style architecture. Notable buildings include the Farmer's Cooperative Store / Blanche Crawford Building, First National Bank (1905), Obenshain Hotel (1860), Morgantown Town Hall (1900), Griffitt-Murphy House and Livery Bank (1895), Parkhurst House (1865), Redman's Lodge (1908), Wisby Hotel (1918), Telephone Exchange (1906), and Morgantown Methodist Episcopal Church complex (1923).

It was listed on the National Register of Historic Places in 2006.
