= Hensley Township, Johnson County, Indiana =

Hensley Township
- Township
- Coordinates: 39°23′29″N 86°11′28″W
- Country: United States
- State: Indiana
- County: Johnson

Government
  - Type: Indiana township

Area
  - Total: 36.92 sq mi (95.6 km^{2})
  - Land: 36.49 sq mi (94.5 km^{2})
  - Water: 0.43 sq mi (1.1 km^{2})
- Elevation: 735 ft (224 m)

Population (2020)
  - Total: 3,771
  - Density: 91.2/sq mi (35.2/km^{2})
- FIPS code: 18-33160
- GNIS feature ID: 453408

Hensley Township is one of nine townships in Johnson County, Indiana. As of the 2010 census, its population was 3,329 and it contained 1,341 housing units. Most of Trafalgar is in the northeast corner of the township.

Hensley Township was organized in 1827.

== Geography ==
According to the 2010 census, the township has a total area of 36.92 square miles (95.6 km^{2}), of which 36.49 square miles (94.5 km^{2}) (or 98.84%) is land and 0.43 square miles (1.1 km^{2}) (or 1.16%) is water.
