= Indiana State Road 252 =

Highway in Indiana

State Road 252
- SR 252 highlighted in red

Route information
- Maintained by INDOT
- Length: 41.724 mi (67.148 km)
- Existed: 1931–present

Western segment
- Length: 30.542 mi (49.153 km)
- West end: I-69 in Martinsville
- Major intersections: US 31 near Edinburgh
- East end: I-65 near Edinburgh

Eastern segment
- Length: 11.182 mi (17.996 km)
- West end: US 52 / SR 1 in Brookville
- East end: SR 126 / SR 129 near Scipio, OH

Location
- Country: United States
- State: Indiana
- Counties: Franklin, Johnson, Morgan, Shelby

Highway system
- Indiana State Highway System; Interstate; US; State; Scenic
← SR 250	→ SR 256

State Road 252 (SR 252) in the U.S. state of Indiana consists of two segments. The western stretch runs from Interstate 69 in Martinsville to Interstate 65 near Edinburgh. The eastern stretch is from U.S. Route 52/State Road 1 in Brookville to the Ohio state line near Scipio, Ohio.

== Route description ==
=== Western section ===
The western section heads southeast from Martinsville. SR 252 heads southeast until Morgantown where it turns northeast towards Trafalgar. SR 252 heads east from Trafalgar towards U.S. Route 31 (US 31). US 31 and SR 252 have a concurrency that ends near Edinburgh. SR 252 passes easterly through Edinburgh to an interchange with Interstate 65 (I-65) where the SR 252 designation terminates. The road continues as a county road to SR 9 named Old State Rd 252.

=== Eastern section ===
From the western terminus of this section at US 52/SR 1, SR 252 heads east towards Ohio. On the way to Ohio SR 252 passes through Mt. Carmel. At the Ohio state line SR 252 ends at an intersection with Ohio State Route 126, near Ohio State Route 129.

== History ==
In the 1930s the western section of SR 252 was to end at SR 29, now U.S. Route 421, but the section from I-65 to SR 29 was never built. The western section ended at Flat Rock until a new part of the road was built to SR 9 in the winter of 2005–2006. Originally SR 252 went along Hospital Road and through what is now Camp Atterbury and Atterbury Fish and Wildlife Area. It was moved north to its current location after Camp Atterbury was built. As of January 19, 2020, SR 252 no longer heads east towards SR 9, per INDOT.

== Major intersections ==
County	Location	mi	km	Destinations	Notes
Morgan	Martinsville	0.000	0.000	I-69 to SR 44 – Evansville, Indianapolis	Connector ramps to SR 44; Western terminus of SR 252 and SR 44
Morgan	Jackson Township	8.994	14.474	SR 135 south – Nashville	Western end of SR 135 concurrency
Johnson	Trafalgar	15.354	24.710	SR 135 north – Indianapolis	Eastern end of SR 135 concurrency
Johnson	Blue River Township	24.077	38.748	US 31 north – Franklin, Greenwood, Indianapolis	Northern end of US 31 concurrency
Johnson	Edinburgh	27.810	44.756	US 31 south – Columbus, Scottsburg	Southern end of US 31 concurrency
Shelby	Edinburgh	30.392– 30.542	48.911– 49.153	I-65 – Indianapolis, Louisville	Exit 80 on I-65; eastern terminus of the western section of SR 252
Gap in route
Franklin	Brookville	36.638	58.963	US 52 / SR 1 to SR 101 – Whitewater Canal State Historic Site	Western terminus of the eastern section of SR 252
Franklin	Springfield Township	47.819	76.957	SR 126 (Cincinnati Brookville Road) / SR 129 (Hamilton Scipio Road) – Cincinnati, Hamilton	Ohio state line
1.000 mi = 1.609 km; 1.000 km = 0.621 mi: Concurrency terminus
