= Nineveh Creek =

Stream in Johnson and Bartholomew County, Indiana, U.S.

Coordinates: 39°19′21″N 85°59′07″W

Nineveh Creek is a stream in Johnson and Bartholomew counties, Indiana, in the United States.

Nineveh Creek was named for Nineveh Berry, a pioneer who fell into the creek while in pursuit of a deer.

== See also ==
- List of rivers of Indiana
