= Nineveh-Hensley-Jackson United School Corporation =

School district in Indiana, United States

Coordinates: 39°24′35.0″N 86°09′30.8″W

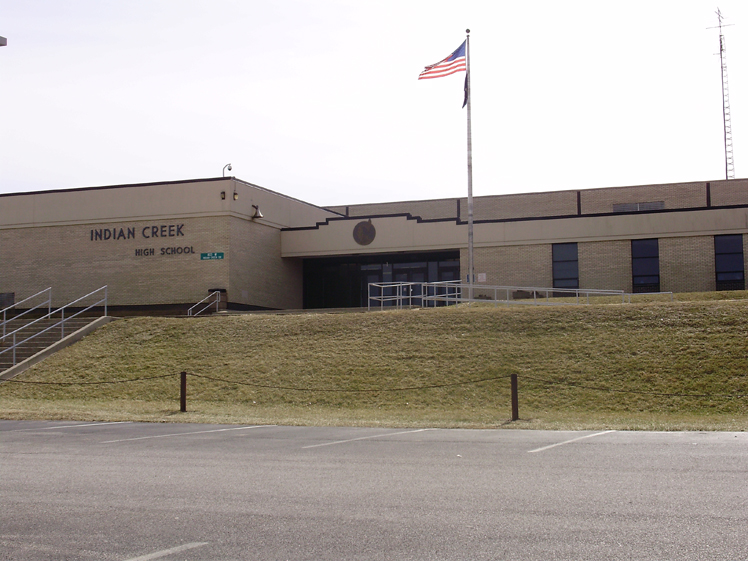
Indian Creek High School

Nineveh-Hensley-Jackson United School Corporation, also known as Indian Creek Schools, is a school district headquartered in Trafalgar, Indiana. The district serves Trafalgar, Morgantown, Nineveh and Princes Lakes, in portions of Johnson, and Morgan Counties. Nineveh-Hensley-Jackson United School Corporation

== Schools ==
- Indian Creek Elementary School
- Indian Creek Intermediate School
- Indian Creek Middle School
- Indian Creek High School
