= Franklin Community Schools =

School district in Indiana

Franklin Community Schools is a school district headquartered in Franklin, Indiana.

The Franklin Community School Corporation was created on January 1, 1963. It was a consolidation of the schools in School City of Franklin, Franklin Township, Needham Township and Union Township. Prior to 1963, the organization was known as 'School City of Franklin.'

It serves almost all of Franklin. A small section of Bargersville is within the school district.

== Schools ==
- Franklin Community High School
- Franklin Community Middle School
- Custer Baker Intermediate School
- Franklin Community Virtual School

Elementary schools

- Creekside
- Needham
- Northwood
- Union
- Webb
