= Harrison Township, Morgan County, Indiana =

Harrison Township
- Township
- Location in Morgan County
- Coordinates: 39°32′29″N 86°16′23″W
- Country: United States
- State: Indiana
- County: Morgan

Government
  - Type: Indiana township

Area
  - Total: 8.89 sq mi (23.0 km^{2})
  - Land: 8.59 sq mi (22.2 km^{2})
  - Water: 0.3 sq mi (0.78 km^{2}) 3.37%
- Elevation: 699 ft (213 m)

Population (2020)
  - Total: 1,566
  - Density: 177.3/sq mi (68.5/km^{2})
- Time zone: UTC-5 (Eastern (EST))
  - Summer (DST): UTC-4 (EDT)
- ZIP code: 46151
- GNIS feature ID: 453393

Harrison Township is one of fourteen townships in Morgan County, Indiana, United States. As of the 2010 census, its population was 1,522 and it contained 625 housing units.

== Geography ==
According to the 2010 census, the township has a total area of 8.89 square miles (23.0 km^{2}), of which 8.59 square miles (22.2 km^{2}) (or 96.63%) is land and 0.3 square miles (0.78 km^{2}) (or 3.37%) is water.

=== Unincorporated towns ===
- Bluffs at 39.568936°N 86.251101°W
- Waverly at 39.556992°N 86.271379°W
- Waverly Woods at 39.551436°N 86.269713°W

=== Cemeteries ===
The township contains these three cemeteries: the Independent Order of Odd Fellows, MacKenzie, and Shiloh.

=== Major highways ===
- Indiana State Road 37

== School districts ==
- Mooresville Con School Corporation

== Political districts ==
- Indiana's 4th congressional district
- State House District 47
- State Senate District 37
