= Nineveh Township, Johnson County, Indiana =

Nineveh Township
- Township
- Coordinates: 39°22′58″N 86°04′56″W
- Country: United States
- State: Indiana
- County: Johnson

Government
  - Type: Indiana township

Area
  - Total: 36.59 sq mi (94.8 km^{2})
  - Land: 36.21 sq mi (93.8 km^{2})
  - Water: 0.37 sq mi (0.96 km^{2})
- Elevation: 797 ft (243 m)

Population (2020)
  - Total: 4,185
  - Density: 110.1/sq mi (42.5/km^{2})
- Time zone: UTC-5 (Eastern (EST))
  - Summer (DST): UTC-4 (EDT)
- FIPS code: 18-54000
- GNIS feature ID: 453668
- Website: ntt.myruralwater.com

Nineveh Township is one of nine townships in Johnson County, Indiana. As of the 2010 census, its population was 3,987 and it contained 1,688 housing units. Nineveh Township took its name from Nineveh Creek.

== Geography ==
According to the 2010 census, the township has a total area of 36.59 square miles (94.8 km^{2}), of which 36.21 square miles (93.8 km^{2}) (or 98.96%) is land and 0.37 square miles (0.96 km^{2}) (or 1.01%) is water.
