= Morgantown, Indiana =

- Town
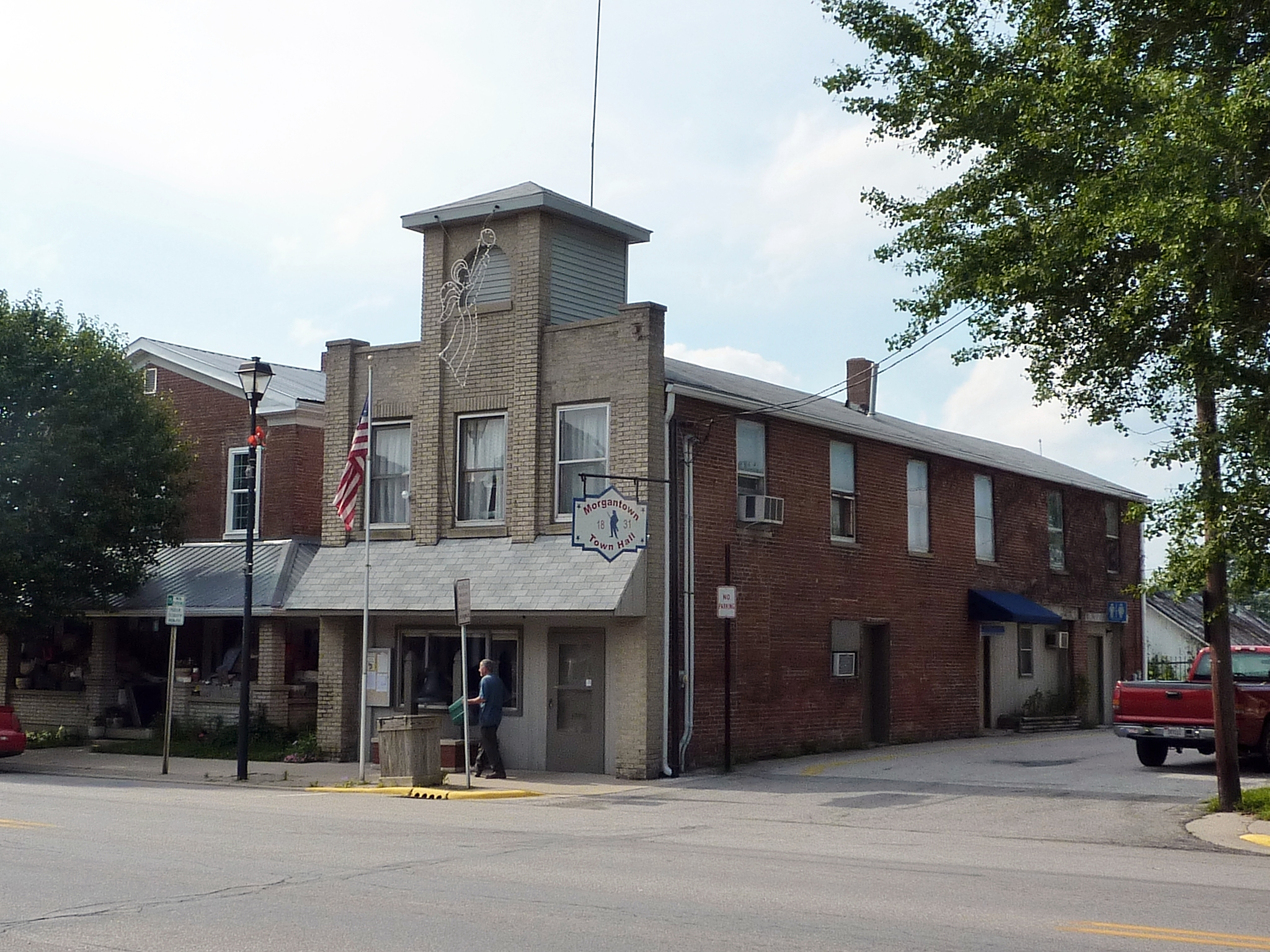
- Morgantown Town Hall

- Logo

- Location in Morgan County, Indiana
- Coordinates: 39°22′28″N 86°15′26″W
- Country: United States
- State: Indiana
- County: Morgan
- Township: Jackson
- Founded: 1831
- Incorporated: 1906

Area
  - Total: 0.38 sq mi (0.98 km^{2})
  - Land: 0.38 sq mi (0.98 km^{2})
  - Water: 0 sq mi (0.00 km^{2})
- Elevation: 679 ft (207 m)

Population (2020)
  - Total: 1,014
  - Density: 2,684.5/sq mi (1,036.51/km^{2})
- Time zone: UTC-5 (Eastern (EST))
  - Summer (DST): UTC-4 (EDT)
- ZIP code: 46160
- Area code: 765
- FIPS code: 18-51102
- GNIS feature ID: 2396781
- Website: morgantown.in.gov

Morgantown is a town at the intersection of Indiana state routes 135 and 252 in Jackson Township, Morgan County, in the U.S. state of Indiana. The population was 1,014 at the 2020 census.

== History ==
Morgantown was founded by Robert Bowles and Samuel Teeters, who first laid out 52 lots in March 1831. A post office has been in operation at Morgantown since 1833.

In 1906, Morgantown was officially incorporated.

The Morgantown Historic District was listed on the National Register of Historic Places in 2006.

== Geography ==
Morgantown is located in southeastern Morgan County. Its eastern border is the Johnson County line. Indiana State Road 252 passes through the town center as Washington Street, leading northwest 10 miles (16 km) to Martinsville, the county seat. State Road 135 joins SR 252 on Washington Street but turns south out of town on Marion Street, leading 12 miles (19 km) to Nashville. The two highways leave town together and lead northeast 6 miles (10 km) to Trafalgar.

According to the U.S. Census Bureau, Morgantown has a total area of 0.38 square miles (0.98 km^{2}), all land. Indian Creek runs along the southern edge of the town, flowing west to the White River south of Martinsville.

== Demographics ==
Historical population
Census	Pop.	Note	%±
1850	230		—
1880	509		—
1910	667		—
1920	831		24.6%
1930	748		−10.0%
1940	724		−3.2%
1950	838		15.7%
1960	971		15.9%
1970	1,134		16.8%
1980	897		−20.9%
1990	978		9.0%
2000	964		−1.4%
2010	986		2.3%
2020	1,014		2.8%
U.S. Decennial Census

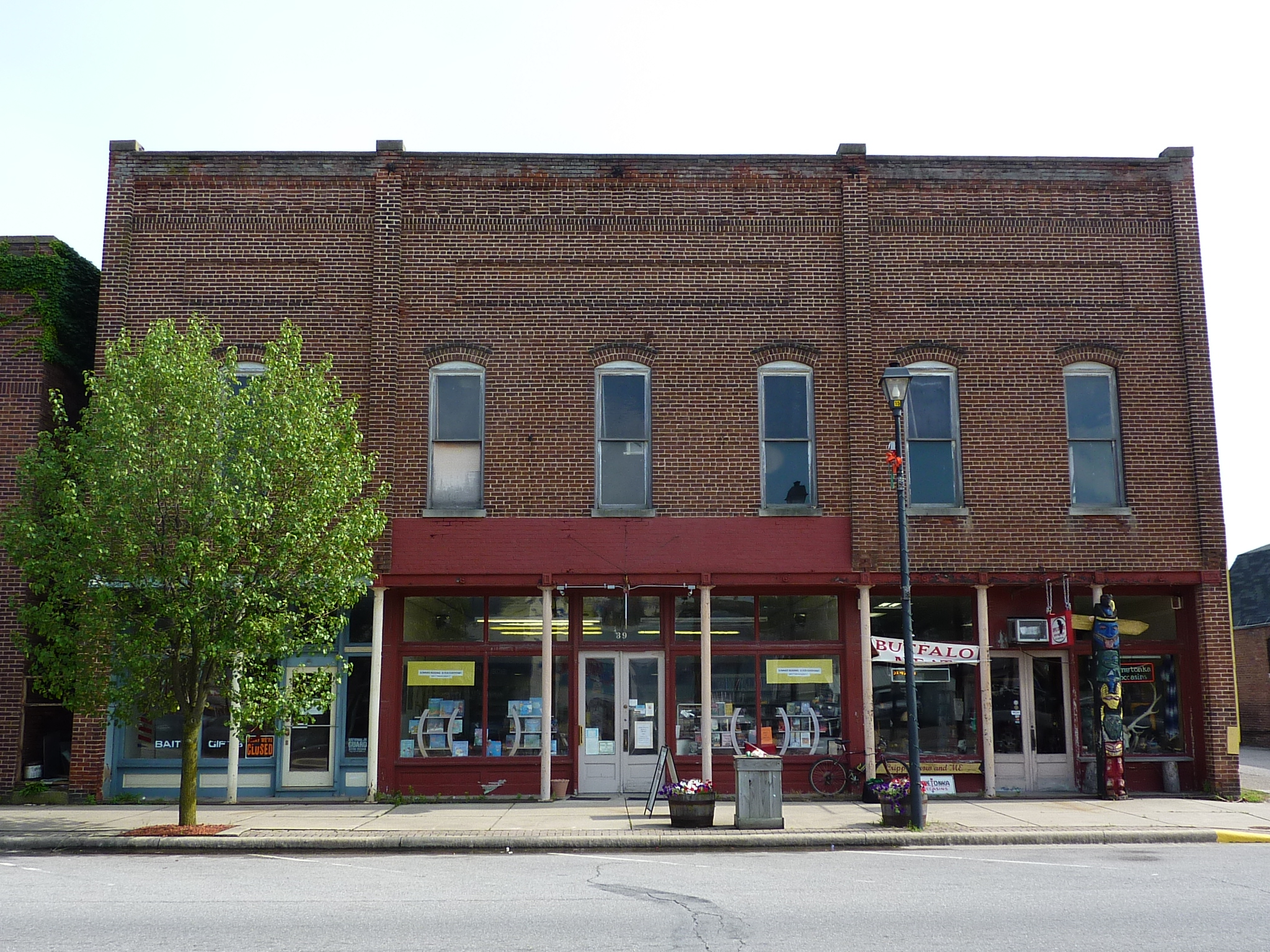
Public library and shops

=== 2020 census ===
As of the 2020 census, Morgantown had a population of 1,014. The median age was 36.9 years. 25.7% of residents were under the age of 18 and 17.0% of residents were 65 years of age or older. For every 100 females there were 95.0 males, and for every 100 females age 18 and over there were 100.3 males age 18 and over.

0.0% of residents lived in urban areas, while 100.0% lived in rural areas.

There were 396 households in Morgantown, of which 38.4% had children under the age of 18 living in them. Of all households, 43.4% were married-couple households, 23.5% were households with a male householder and no spouse or partner present, and 26.8% were households with a female householder and no spouse or partner present. About 30.9% of all households were made up of individuals and 12.4% had someone living alone who was 65 years of age or older.

There were 416 housing units, of which 4.8% were vacant. The homeowner vacancy rate was 3.2% and the rental vacancy rate was 0.6%.

Racial composition as of the 2020 census
Race	Number	Percent
White	948	93.5%
Black or African American	8	0.8%
American Indian and Alaska Native	3	0.3%
Asian	0	0.0%
Native Hawaiian and Other Pacific Islander	1	0.1%
Some other race	6	0.6%
Two or more races	48	4.7%
Hispanic or Latino (of any race)	15	1.5%

=== 2010 census ===
As of the 2010 census, there were 986 people, 374 households, and 236 families living in the town. The population density was 2,594.7 inhabitants per square mile (1,001.8/km^{2}). There were 418 housing units at an average density of 1,100.0 per square mile (424.7/km^{2}). The racial makeup of the town was 98.5% White, 0.1% African American, 0.4% Native American, 0.2% Asian, 0.3% from other races, and 0.5% from two or more races. Hispanic or Latino of any race were 0.4% of the population.

There were 374 households, of which 36.1% had children under the age of 18 living with them, 43.3% were married couples living together, 15.0% had a female householder with no husband present, 4.8% had a male householder with no wife present, and 36.9% were non-families. 31.0% of all households were made up of individuals, and 13.6% had someone living alone who was 65 years of age or older. The average household size was 2.54 and the average family size was 3.18.

The median age in the town was 37.9 years. 26.5% of residents were under the age of 18; 7.7% were between the ages of 18 and 24; 26.3% were from 25 to 44; 23.5% were from 45 to 64; and 16.1% were 65 years of age or older. The gender makeup of the town was 47.6% male and 52.4% female.

=== 2000 census ===
As of the census of 2000, there were 964 people, 366 households, and 259 families living in the town. The population density was 2,521.6 inhabitants per square mile (973.6/km^{2}). There were 394 housing units at an average density of 1,030.6 per square mile (397.9/km^{2}). The racial makeup of the town was 99.17% White, 0.31% African American, 0.31% Native American, 0.10% from other races, and 0.10% from two or more races. Hispanic or Latino of any race were 0.62% of the population.

There were 366 households, out of which 34.4% had children under the age of 18 living with them, 57.4% were married couples living together, 10.9% had a female householder with no husband present, and 29.2% were non-families. 26.2% of all households were made up of individuals, and 13.4% had someone living alone who was 65 years of age or older. The average household size was 2.51 and the average family size was 3.05.

In the town, the population was spread out, with 25.6% under the age of 18, 7.7% from 18 to 24, 29.1% from 25 to 44, 20.6% from 45 to 64, and 16.9% who were 65 years of age or older. The median age was 35 years. For every 100 females, there were 86.5 males. For every 100 females age 18 and over, there were 80.2 males.

The median income for a household in the town was $33,158, and the median income for a family was $45,385. Males had a median income of $31,066 versus $23,068 for females. The per capita income for the town was $17,504. About 2.2% of families and 8.3% of the population were below the poverty line, including 2.6% of those under age 18 and 31.3% of those age 65 or over.

== Education ==
Morgantown has a public library, a branch of the Morgan County Public Library.
