= Center Grove Community School Corporation =

School district in Greenwood, Indiana

Address
- 4800 West Stones Crossing Road Greenwood, Indiana, 46143 or 46106; United States
- Coordinates: 39°34′40″N 86°11′26″W

District information
- Grades: K-12
- Superintendent: William Long
- NCES District ID: 1801440

Students and staff
- Students: 7,735
- Faculty: 376.54 (FTE)
- Student–teacher ratio: 20.54

Other information
- Website: www.centergrove.k12.in.us

Center Grove Community School Corporation is a school district located in Greenwood, Indiana.

It serves several portions of western Greenwood and most of Bargersville.

== Schools ==
- Center Grove High School
- Center Grove Middle School Central
- Center Grove Middle School North
- Center Grove Elementary School
- Walnut Grove Elementary School
- Maple Grove Elementary School
- North Grove Elementary School
- Pleasant Grove Elementary School
- Sugar Grove Elementary School
