= Trafalgar, Indiana =

- Town
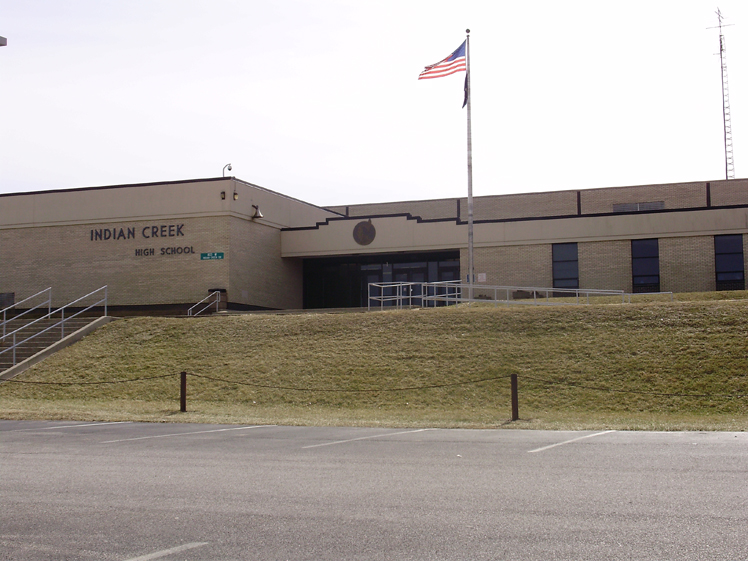
- Indian Creek High School in Trafalgar

- Seal
- Motto(s): "Preserving The Past, Growing With Purpose"
- Location of Trafalgar in Johnson County, Indiana
- Coordinates: 39°24′45″N 86°09′00″W
- Country: United States
- State: Indiana
- County: Johnson
- Township: Nineveh, Hensley

Area
  - Total: 2.56 sq mi (6.63 km^{2})
  - Land: 2.56 sq mi (6.63 km^{2})
  - Water: 0 sq mi (0.00 km^{2})
- Elevation: 843 ft (257 m)

Population (2020)
  - Total: 1,422
  - Density: 555.5/sq mi (214.48/km^{2})
- Time zone: UTC-5 (Eastern (EST))
  - Summer (DST): UTC-4 (EDT)
- ZIP code: 46181
- Area code: 317
- FIPS code: 18-76310
- GNIS feature ID: 2397699
- Website: townoftrafalgar.org

Trafalgar is a town in the Nineveh and Hensley townships, Johnson County, Indiana, United States. As of the 2020 census, Trafalgar had a population of 1,422.

This town is 20 miles (32 km) south of Indianapolis.

== History ==
Col. Avery Mustain Buckner is credited for platting a town, in the early 1800s, along a short-lived flat bar railroad that ran between Franklin and Martinsville. First named Liberty, the name was changed to Trafalgar to commemorate the British victory over Napoleon in the battle of the same name. Soon Ezekiel W. Morgan came to town to open a store. Denied a site near the railroad, he bought land in a nearby village founded by George Bridges.

The railroad was rebuilt as the Fairland and Martinsville branch of the Big Four. The post office (and town name) was moved to Morgan's store. By 1816, the “old” and “new” Trafalgars had grown together and were briefly incorporated as one. The current town of Trafalgar was reincorporated in 1946. By the 1990s, the town had grown 266%.

== Geography ==
According to the 2010 census, Trafalgar has a total area of 2.64 square miles (6.84 km^{2}), all land.

== Education ==
It is within the Nineveh-Hensley-Jackson United School Corporation. Trafalgar is home to Indian Creek Senior High School, one of seven high schools located in Johnson County. It is also home to Indian Creek Middle School and Indian Creek Elementary School.

Trafalgar has a public library, a branch of the Johnson County Public Library.

== Demographics ==
Historical population
Census	Pop.	Note	%±
1880	462		—
1950	439		—
1960	459		4.6%
1970	457		−0.4%
1980	466		2.0%
1990	531		13.9%
2000	798		50.3%
2010	1,101		38.0%
2020	1,422		29.2%
U.S. Decennial Census

=== 2020 census ===
As of the 2020 census, Trafalgar had a population of 1,422. The median age was 33.6 years. 30.1% of residents were under the age of 18 and 12.1% of residents were 65 years of age or older. For every 100 females there were 98.6 males, and for every 100 females age 18 and over there were 94.1 males age 18 and over.

0.0% of residents lived in urban areas, while 100.0% lived in rural areas.

There were 532 households in Trafalgar, of which 43.0% had children under the age of 18 living in them. Of all households, 53.2% were married-couple households, 14.8% were households with a male householder and no spouse or partner present, and 25.4% were households with a female householder and no spouse or partner present. About 22.0% of all households were made up of individuals and 9.0% had someone living alone who was 65 years of age or older.

There were 550 housing units, of which 3.3% were vacant. The homeowner vacancy rate was 0.5% and the rental vacancy rate was 1.5%.

Racial composition as of the 2020 census
Race	Number	Percent
White	1,333	93.7%
Black or African American	5	0.4%
American Indian and Alaska Native	1	0.1%
Asian	7	0.5%
Native Hawaiian and Other Pacific Islander	1	0.1%
Some other race	15	1.1%
Two or more races	60	4.2%
Hispanic or Latino (of any race)	24	1.7%

=== 2010 census ===
As of the 2010 census, the town had 1,101 people that comprised 385 households and 292 families. The population density was 417.0 inhabitants per square mile (161.0/km^{2}). There were 419 housing units at an average density of 158.7 per square mile (61.3/km^{2}). The racial makeup of the town was 96.3% White, 0.9% African American, 0.9% Native American, 0.5% Asian, 0.3% from other races, and 1.1% from two or more races. Hispanic or Latino people of any race were 1.0% of the population.

Of the 385 households 46.8% had children under the age of 18 living with them, 54.3% were married couples living together, 14.8% had a female householder with no husband present, 6.8% had a male householder with no wife present, and 24.2% were non-families. 20.0% of households were one person and 6.5% were one person aged 65 or older. The average household size was 2.83 and the average family size was 3.24.

The median age in the town was 34.2 years. 30.2% of residents were under the age of 18; 9.2% were between the ages of 18 and 24; 28.8% were from 25 to 44; 23.5% were from 45 to 64; and 8.2% were 65 or older. The gender makeup of the town was 49.3% male and 50.7% female.

=== 2000 census ===
At the 2000 census there were 798 people, 263 households, and 208 families in the town. The population density was 619.2 inhabitants per square mile (239.1/km^{2}). There were 286 housing units at an average density of 221.9 per square mile (85.7/km^{2}). The racial makeup of the town was 98.75% White, 0.63% Native American, 0.50% Asian, and 0.13% from two or more races. Hispanic or Latino people of any race were 0.88%.

Of the 263 households 52.1% had children under the age of 18 living with them, 63.9% were married couples living together, 11.8% had a female householder with no husband present, and 20.9% were non-families. 18.3% of households were one person and 5.7% were one person aged 65 or older. The average household size was 2.99 and the average family size was 3.39.

The age distribution was 35.2% under the age of 18, 7.1% from 18 to 24, 36.3% from 25 to 44, 12.9% from 45 to 64, and 8.4% 65 or older. The median age was 30 years. For every 100 females, there were 95.1 males. For every 100 females age 18 and over, there were 98.1 males.

The median household income was $50,357 and the median family income was $54,531. Males had a median income of $38,438 versus $22,083 for females. The per capita income for the town was $17,079. About 3.5% of families and 8.4% of the population were below the poverty line, including 10.3% of those under age 18 and 9.7% of those age 65 or over.

== Notable people ==
- Elmer S. Riggs, paleontologist
