= Bargersville, Indiana =

- Town
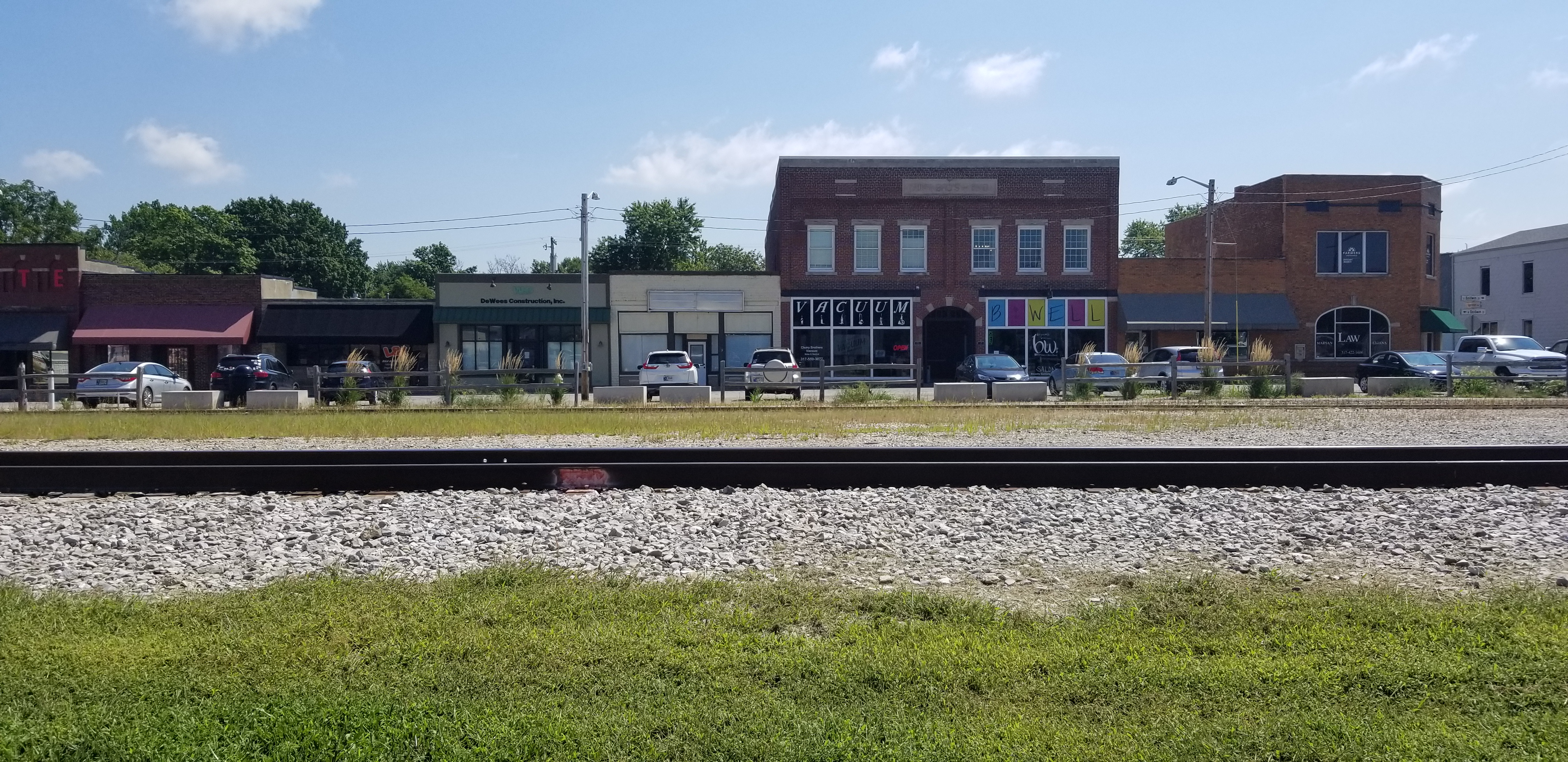

- Logo

- Location of Bargersville in Johnson County, Indiana.
- Coordinates: 39°32′40″N 86°13′10″W
- Country: United States
- State: Indiana
- County: Johnson
- Townships: White River, Union

Government
  - Town Manager: Dax Norton

Area
  - Total: 18.73 sq mi (48.50 km^{2})
  - Land: 18.71 sq mi (48.46 km^{2})
  - Water: 0.019 sq mi (0.05 km^{2})
- Elevation: 801 ft (244 m)

Population (2020)
  - Total: 9,560
  - Density: 511.0/sq mi (197.29/km^{2})
- Time zone: UTC-5 (EST)
  - Summer (DST): UTC-4 (EDT)
- ZIP code: 46106
- Area code: 317
- FIPS code: 18-03394
- GNIS ID: 2396585
- Website: bargersville.in.gov

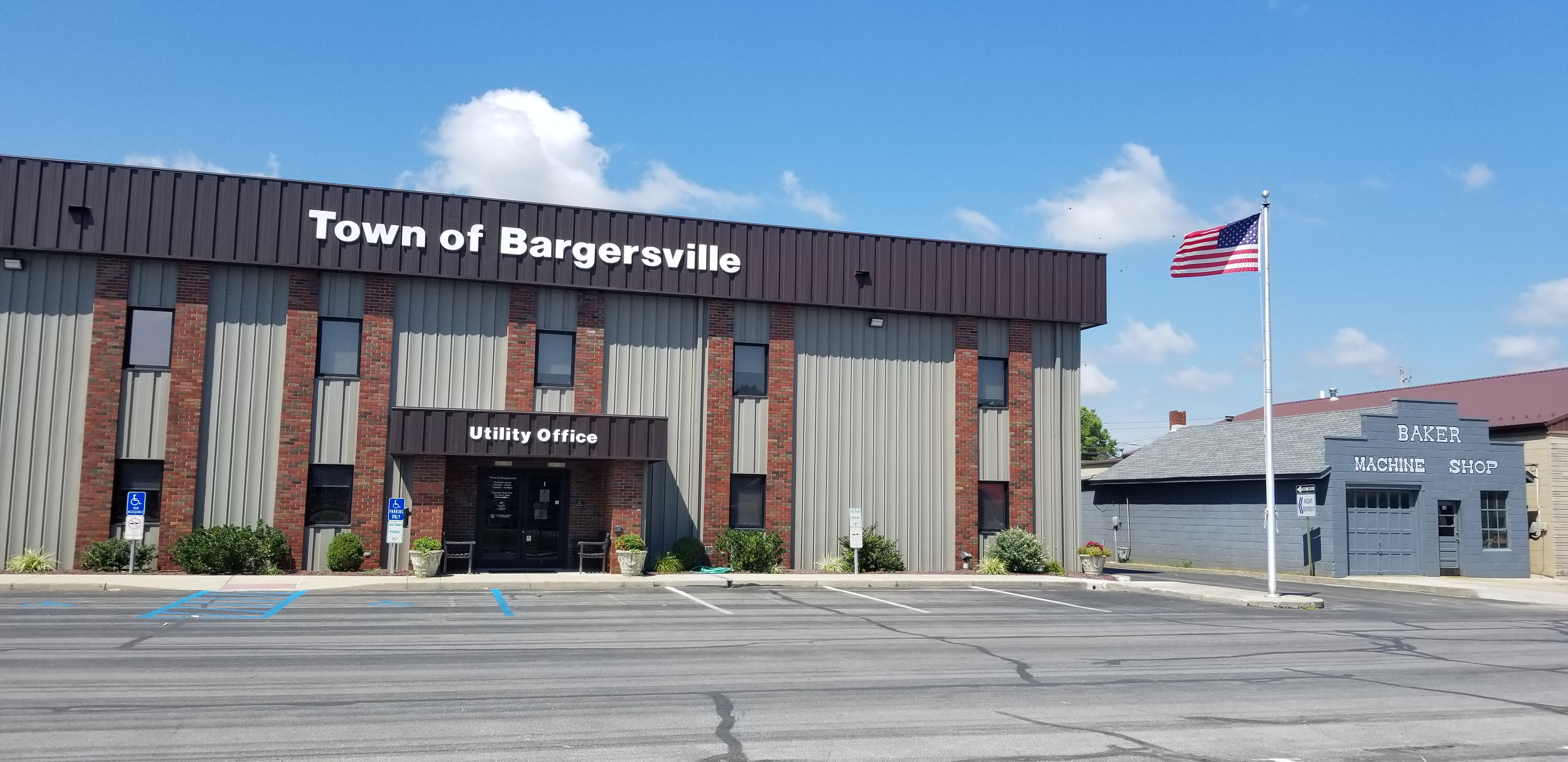
Bargersville Town Hall

Bargersville (/ˈbɑːrɡərzvɪl/) is a town in White River and Union townships, Johnson County, Indiana, United States. The population was 9,560 at the 2020 census.

== History ==
Bargersville was established in 1906 when the railroad was extended to that point. It took its name from Old Bargersville, Indiana.

== Geography ==
According to the 2010 census, Bargersville has a total area of 4.93 square miles (12.77 km^{2}), all land.

== Demographics ==
Historical population
| Census | Pop. | Note | %± |
|---|---|---|---|
| 1880 | 77 | | — |
| 1920 | 290 | | — |
| 1930 | 282 | | −2.8% |
| 1940 | 297 | | 5.3% |
| 1950 | 413 | | 39.1% |
| 1960 | 586 | | 41.9% |
| 1970 | 873 | | 49.0% |
| 1980 | 1,647 | | 88.7% |
| 1990 | 1,681 | | 2.1% |
| 2000 | 2,120 | | 26.1% |
| 2010 | 4,013 | | 89.3% |
| 2020 | 9,560 | | 138.2% |
U.S. Decennial Census

=== 2020 census ===
As of the 2020 census, Bargersville had a population of 9,560. The median age was 35.8 years. 30.2% of residents were under the age of 18 and 13.3% of residents were 65 years of age or older. For every 100 females there were 97.1 males, and for every 100 females age 18 and over there were 92.5 males age 18 and over.

82.3% of residents lived in urban areas, while 17.7% lived in rural areas.

There were 3,326 households in Bargersville, of which 44.2% had children under the age of 18 living in them. Of all households, 63.6% were married-couple households, 11.6% were households with a male householder and no spouse or partner present, and 19.1% were households with a female householder and no spouse or partner present. About 17.3% of all households were made up of individuals and 7.6% had someone living alone who was 65 years of age or older.

There were 3,488 housing units, of which 4.6% were vacant. The homeowner vacancy rate was 1.4% and the rental vacancy rate was 4.4%.

Racial composition as of the 2020 census
| Race | Number | Percent |
|---|---|---|
| White | 8,449 | 88.4% |
| Black or African American | 195 | 2.0% |
| American Indian and Alaska Native | 15 | 0.2% |
| Asian | 393 | 4.1% |
| Native Hawaiian and Other Pacific Islander | 0 | 0.0% |
| Some other race | 85 | 0.9% |
| Two or more races | 423 | 4.4% |
| Hispanic or Latino (of any race) | 276 | 2.9% |

=== 2010 census ===
As of the 2010 census, there were 4,013 people, 1,492 households, and 1,055 families living in the town. The population density was 814.0 inhabitants per square mile (314.3/km^{2}). There were 1,692 housing units at an average density of 343.2 per square mile (132.5/km^{2}). The racial makeup of the town was 95.6% White, 1.1% African American, 0.3% Native American, 1.0% Asian, 0.4% from other races, and 1.6% from two or more races. Hispanic or Latino of any race were 2.1% of the population.

There were 1,492 households, of which 41.0% had children under the age of 18 living with them, 56.0% were married couples living together, 9.9% had a female householder with no husband present, 4.8% had a male householder with no wife present, and 29.3% were non-families. 21.8% of all households were made up of individuals, and 5% had someone living alone who was 65 years of age or older. The average household size was 2.69 and the average family size was 3.18.

The median age in the town was 33.2 years. 29.2% of residents were under the age of 18; 7.2% were between the ages of 18 and 24; 32.6% were from 25 to 44; 23.2% were from 45 to 64; and 7.7% were 65 years of age or older. The gender makeup of the town was 51.2% male and 48.8% female.

=== 2000 census ===
As of the 2000 census, there were 2,120 people, 770 households, and 588 families living in the town. The population density was 1,941.4 inhabitants per square mile (749.6/km^{2}). There were 787 housing units at an average density of 720.7 per square mile (278.3/km^{2}). The racial makeup of the town was 99.10% White, 0.05% African American, 0.19% Native American, 0.14% Asian, 0.05% from other races, and 0.47% from two or more races. Hispanic or Latino of any race were 0.47% of the population.

There were 770 households, out of which 43.0% had children under the age of 18 living with them, 60.3% were married couples living together, 11.6% had a female householder with no husband present, and 23.6% were non-families. 18.8% of all households were made up of individuals, and 5.1% had someone living alone who was 65 years of age or older. The average household size was 2.74 and the average family size was 3.12.

In the town, the population was spread out, with 30.4% under the age of 18, 8.8% from 18 to 24, 35.0% from 25 to 44, 19.4% from 45 to 64, and 6.5% who were 65 years of age or older. The median age was 31 years. For every 100 females, there were 100.9 males. For every 100 females age 18 and over, there were 97.6 males.

The median income for a household in the town was $48,264, and the median income for a family was $50,417. Males had a median income of $37,139 versus $24,205 for females. The per capita income for the town was $19,499. About 3.7% of families and 4.3% of the population were below the poverty line, including 5.1% of those under age 18 and 1.3% of those age 65 or over.

== Education ==
Most of Bargersville is in Center Grove Community School Corporation, served by Center Grove High School. Small sections of Bargersville are in Franklin Community Schools, served by Franklin Community High School.

== Notable people ==
- Todd Young, U.S. Senator
