= Needham Township, Johnson County, Indiana =

Needham Township
- Township
- Coordinates: 39°29′14″N 85°59′58″W
- Country: United States
- State: Indiana
- County: Johnson

Government
  - Type: Indiana township

Area
  - Total: 35.03 sq mi (90.7 km^{2})
  - Land: 35.01 sq mi (90.7 km^{2})
  - Water: 0.02 sq mi (0.052 km^{2})
- Elevation: 720 ft (220 m)

Population (2020)
  - Total: 7,573
  - Density: 186/sq mi (72/km^{2})
- FIPS code: 18-52164
- GNIS feature ID: 453658

Needham Township was one of nine townships in Johnson County, Indiana. As of the 2010 census, its population was 6,511 and it contained 2,613 housing units.

As of January 1, 2022, Franklin, Union, and Needham townships were merged into a single entity known as Franklin-Union-Needham Township ("FUN").

Needham Township was formed in 1881.

== Geography ==
According to the 2010 census, the township has a total area of 35.03 square miles (90.7 km^{2}), of which 35.01 square miles (90.7 km^{2}) (or 99.94%) is land and 0.02 square miles (0.052 km^{2}) (or 0.06%) is water.
