= White River Township, Johnson County, Indiana =

White River Township
- Township
- Nicknames: Center Grove, Smith Valley
- Coordinates: 39°34′40″N 86°11′35″W
- Country: United States
- State: Indiana
- County: Johnson

Government
  - Type: Indiana township

Area
  - Total: 47.4 sq mi (123 km^{2})
  - Land: 47.08 sq mi (121.9 km^{2})
  - Water: 0.31 sq mi (0.80 km^{2})
- Elevation: 725 ft (221 m)

Population (2020)
  - Total: 52,365
  - Density: 894.2/sq mi (345.3/km^{2})
- Time zone: UTC-5 (Eastern (EST))
  - Summer (DST): UTC-4 (EDT)
- ZIP codes: 46142, 46143
- Area code(s): 317, 463
- FIPS code: 18-83924
- GNIS feature ID: 454055
- Website: whiterivertownship.org

White River Township is one of nine townships in Johnson County, Indiana, United States. As of the 2010 census, its population was 42,100 and it contained 16,122 housing units.

== Geography ==
According to the 2010 census, the township has a total area of 47.4 square miles (123 km^{2}), of which 47.08 square miles (121.9 km^{2}) (or 99.32%) is land and 0.31 square miles (0.80 km^{2}) (or 0.65%) is water.

== Education ==
Education is provided by Center Grove, Maple Grove, North Grove, Pleasant Grove, and Sugar Grove Elementary Schools, Middle School Central and Middle School North, and Center Grove High School. Saints Francis & Clare also provides a Catholic education for children in grades preschool through 8th grade.
