= Union Township, Johnson County, Indiana =

Union Township
- Township
- Coordinates: 39°29′02″N 86°11′29″W
- Country: United States
- State: Indiana
- County: Johnson

Government
  - Type: Indiana township

Area
  - Total: 36.15 sq mi (93.6 km^{2})
  - Land: 36.14 sq mi (93.6 km^{2})
  - Water: 0.01 sq mi (0.026 km^{2})
- Elevation: 814 ft (248 m)

Population (2020)
  - Total: 2,831
  - Density: 74.4/sq mi (28.7/km^{2})
- FIPS code: 18-77390
- GNIS feature ID: 453921

Union Township was one of nine townships in Johnson County, Indiana. As of the 2010 census, its population was 2,689 and it contained 1,068 housing units.

As of January 1, 2022, Franklin, Union, and Needham townships were merged into a single entity known as Franklin-Union-Needham Township ("FUN").

Union Township was organized in 1830.

Public schools existed in Union Township going back at least to the 1860s. In 1889, the Vandivier School (School District Number 8) was opened and in the summer of 1890, the school building in Providence opened.

In 1906, a centralized school was opened in Union Township offering elementary and high school education.

In February 1928, the Union Township School was destroyed by fire. A new school building was dedicated on May 3, 1929. This building remains in use by the Franklin Community School Corporation, housing Union Elementary School.

Union Township continued to offer high school courses until 1963. Beginning in the 1963–1964 school year, high school students in Union Township were transported to Franklin Community High School.

== Geography ==
According to the 2010 census, the township has a total area of 36.15 square miles (93.6 km^{2}), of which 36.14 square miles (93.6 km^{2}) (or 99.97%) is land and 0.01 square miles (0.026 km^{2}) (or 0.03%) is water.
