= Johnson County, Indiana =

County in Indiana, United States

- County
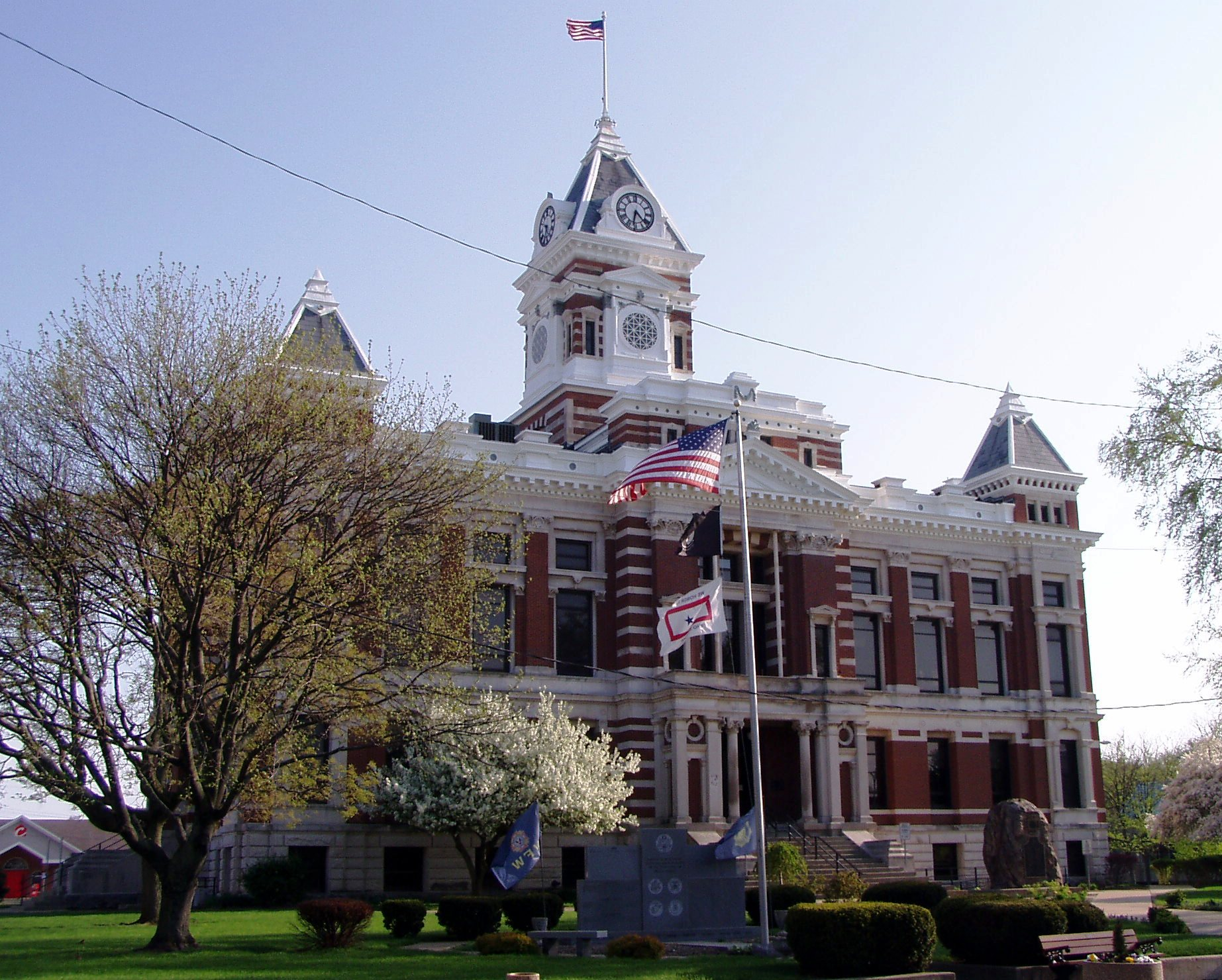
- Johnson County Courthouse in Franklin, Indiana

- Location within the U.S. state of Indiana
- Coordinates: 39°29′N 86°06′W
- Country: United States
- State: Indiana
- Founded: 1823
- Seat: Franklin
- Largest city: Greenwood

Area
  - Total: 321.79 sq mi (833.4 km^{2})
  - Land: 320.43 sq mi (829.9 km^{2})
  - Water: 1.36 sq mi (3.5 km^{2}) 0.42%

Population (2020)
  - Total: 161,765
  - Estimate (2025): 174,262 ▲
  - Density: 504.84/sq mi (194.92/km^{2})
- Time zone: UTC−5 (Eastern)
  - Summer (DST): UTC−4 (EDT)
- Congressional district: 6th
- Website: johnsoncounty.in.gov
- Indiana county number 41

Johnson County is a county located in the U.S. state of Indiana. As of 2020, the population was 161,765. The county seat is Franklin. Johnson County is included in the Indianapolis-Carmel-Anderson, IN Metropolitan Statistical Area.

== Transportation ==
=== Transit ===
- Access Johnson County

=== Major highways ===
- Interstate 65
- Interstate 69
- U.S. Route 31
- State Road 44
- State Road 135
- State Road 144
- State Road 252

=== Airport ===
- KHFY - Greenwood Municipal Airport
- 3FK - Franklin Flying Field

== Geography ==
According to the 2010 census, the county has a total area of 321.79 square miles (833.4 km^{2}), of which 320.43 square miles (829.9 km^{2}) (or 99.58%) is land and 1.36 square miles (3.5 km^{2}) (or 0.42%) is water.

=== Adjacent counties ===
- Marion County (north)
- Shelby County (east)
- Bartholomew County (southeast)
- Brown County (southwest)
- Morgan County (west)

== History ==
Johnson County was formed in 1823. It was named for John Johnson, a Justice of the Indiana Supreme Court. This is probably John Johnson of Knox County, delegate to the State constitutional convention, appointed to the Supreme Court in 1816.

== Cities and towns ==
- Bargersville
- Edinburgh (part)
- Franklin
- Greenwood
- New Whiteland
- Princes Lakes
- Trafalgar
- Whiteland

=== Extinct ===
- Farwest

== Townships ==
- Blue River
- Clark
- Franklin-Union-Needham, which merged in January 2022
- Hensley
- Nineveh
- Pleasant
- White River

The south end of the county is also home to the Camp Atterbury military installation.

== Climate and weather ==
Franklin, Indiana

Climate chart (precipitation, max. and min. temperature)
J	F	M	A	M	J	J	A	S	O	N	D
3.1 36 21	2.4 41 24	3.7 52 34	4.3 64 43	4.8 73 54	5 82 63	4.4 86 66	3.2 84 65	3.1 78 57	3.2 66 46	3.5 52 35	2.9 40 26
- █ Average max. and min. temperatures in °F
- █ Precipitation totals in inches
- Source: The Weather Channel
Metric conversion
J	F	M	A	M	J	J	A	S	O	N	D
79 2 −6	62 5 −4	94 11 1	110 18 6	121 23 12	126 28 17	112 30 19	81 29 18	80 26 14	82 19 8	88 11 2	74 4 −3
- █ Average max. and min. temperatures in °C
- █ Precipitation totals in mm

In recent years, average temperatures in Franklin have ranged from a low of 21 °F (−6 °C) in January to a high of 86 °F (30 °C) in July, although a record low of −22 °F (−30 °C) was recorded in January 1985 and a record high of 104 °F (40 °C) was recorded in June 1988. Average monthly precipitation ranged from 2.05 inches (52 mm) in January to 4.78 inches (121 mm) in July. The coldest temperature ever recorded in Indiana was in the town of New Whiteland, Indiana, on January 19, 1994, when the temperature reached −36 °F (−38 °C).

== Government ==
The county government is a constitutional body, and is granted specific powers by the Constitution of Indiana, and by the Indiana Code.

County Council: The county council is the legislative branch of the county government and controls all the spending and revenue collection in the county. Representatives are elected from county districts. The council members serve four-year terms. They are responsible for setting salaries, the annual budget, and special spending. The council also has limited authority to impose local taxes, in the form of an income and property tax that is subject to state level approval, excise taxes, and service taxes.

Board of Commissioners: The executive body of the county is made of a board of commissioners. The commissioners are elected county-wide, in staggered terms, and each serves a four-year term. One of the commissioners, typically the most senior, serves as president. The commissioners are charged with executing the acts legislated by the council, collecting revenue, and managing the day-to-day functions of the county government.

Courts: The county maintains a Circuit Court can handle all types of cases, unless a particular case type is specifically reserved to another court. The county also maintains three Superior Courts that also handle all types of cases, and also handle the small claims and juvenile cases. The judges on each of the courts is elected to a term of four years and must be a member of the Indiana Bar Association.

County Officials: The county has several other elected offices that are mandated by the Indiana Constitution. These include sheriff, coroner, assessor, auditor, recorder, surveyor, and circuit court clerk Each of these elected officers serves terms of four years and oversee different parts of the county government. Members elected to county government positions are required to declare party affiliations and to be residents of the county.

Johnson County is part of Indiana's Indiana's 9th congressional district; Indiana Senate districts 36, 37, and 41; and Indiana House of Representatives districts 47, 58, 65, and 93.

United States presidential election results for Johnson County, Indiana
Year	Republican		Democratic		Third party(ies)	
Year	No.	%	No.	%	No.	%
1888	2,168	43.45%	2,594	51.98%	228	4.57%
1892	2,093	41.05%	2,606	51.11%	400	7.84%
1896	2,288	41.92%	3,083	56.49%	87	1.59%
1900	2,367	41.95%	3,088	54.72%	188	3.33%
1904	2,574	44.44%	2,882	49.76%	336	5.80%
1908	2,519	42.04%	3,268	54.54%	205	3.42%
1912	924	16.82%	2,890	52.59%	1,681	30.59%
1916	2,428	42.32%	3,108	54.17%	201	3.50%
1920	4,863	45.36%	5,452	50.85%	407	3.80%
1924	4,954	50.77%	4,699	48.16%	104	1.07%
1928	5,513	54.30%	4,548	44.80%	91	0.90%
1932	4,593	39.20%	6,940	59.23%	185	1.58%
1936	5,315	43.11%	6,934	56.24%	80	0.65%
1940	6,451	50.18%	6,350	49.39%	56	0.44%
1944	6,194	53.06%	5,426	46.48%	53	0.45%
1948	6,151	49.39%	6,216	49.91%	87	0.70%
1952	9,119	60.46%	5,909	39.18%	54	0.36%
1956	10,125	62.15%	6,125	37.60%	41	0.25%
1960	12,426	62.38%	7,400	37.15%	93	0.47%
1964	10,472	50.68%	10,099	48.87%	92	0.45%
1968	12,089	57.26%	5,946	28.17%	3,076	14.57%
1972	17,537	77.17%	5,067	22.30%	120	0.53%
1976	16,414	61.36%	10,075	37.66%	260	0.97%
1980	20,018	66.34%	8,445	27.99%	1,711	5.67%
1984	23,482	74.86%	7,715	24.60%	171	0.55%
1988	24,654	72.99%	9,001	26.65%	123	0.36%
1992	20,353	54.36%	8,712	23.27%	8,373	22.36%
1996	23,733	60.45%	11,278	28.73%	4,248	10.82%
2000	29,404	69.54%	11,952	28.27%	928	2.19%
2004	37,765	73.68%	13,109	25.58%	381	0.74%
2008	36,487	62.07%	21,553	36.66%	746	1.27%
2012	39,513	68.02%	17,260	29.71%	1,319	2.27%
2016	45,456	67.70%	17,318	25.79%	4,373	6.51%
2020	51,219	65.83%	24,736	31.79%	1,847	2.37%
2024	51,588	66.09%	24,880	31.87%	1,591	2.04%

== Demographics ==
Historical population
Census	Pop.	Note	%±
1830	4,019		—
1840	9,352		132.7%
1850	12,101		29.4%
1860	14,854		22.8%
1870	18,366		23.6%
1880	19,537		6.4%
1890	19,561		0.1%
1900	20,223		3.4%
1910	20,394		0.8%
1920	20,739		1.7%
1930	21,706		4.7%
1940	22,493		3.6%
1950	26,183		16.4%
1960	43,704		66.9%
1970	61,138		39.9%
1980	77,240		26.3%
1990	88,109		14.1%
2000	115,209		30.8%
2010	139,654		21.2%
2020	161,765		15.8%
2025 (est.)	174,262	▲	7.7%
U.S. Decennial Census; 1790–1960 1900–1990; 1990–2000 2010–2020

=== Racial and ethnic composition ===
Johnson County, Indiana – Racial and ethnic composition Note: the US Census treats Hispanic/Latino as an ethnic category. This table excludes Latinos from the racial categories and assigns them to a separate category. Hispanics/Latinos may be of any race.
Race / Ethnicity (NH = Non-Hispanic)	Pop 1980	Pop 1990	Pop 2000	Pop 2010	Pop 2020	% 1980	% 1990	% 2000	% 2010	% 2020
White alone (NH)	75,532	85,966	110,839	128,903	136,748	97.79%	97.57%	96.21%	92.30%	84.53%
Black or African American alone (NH)	824	835	900	1,536	3,850	1.07%	0.95%	0.78%	1.10%	2.38%
Native American or Alaska Native alone (NH)	63	135	195	252	280	0.08%	0.15%	0.17%	0.18%	0.17%
Asian alone (NH)	284	534	945	2,716	7,420	0.37%	0.61%	0.82%	1.94%	4.59%
Native Hawaiian or Pacific Islander alone (NH)	x	x	31	46	69	x	x	0.03%	0.03%	0.04%
Other race alone (NH)	59	12	55	150	623	0.08%	0.01%	0.05%	0.11%	0.39%
Mixed race or Multiracial (NH)	x	x	653	1,781	6,381	x	x	0.57%	1.28%	3.94%
Hispanic or Latino (any race)	478	627	1,591	4,270	6,394	0.62%	0.71%	1.38%	3.06%	3.95%
Total	77,240	88,109	115,209	139,654	161,765	100.00%	100.00%	100.00%	100.00%	100.00%

=== 2020 census ===
As of the 2020 census, the county had a population of 161,765. The median age was 37.8 years. 25.0% of residents were under the age of 18 and 15.7% of residents were 65 years of age or older. For every 100 females there were 96.2 males, and for every 100 females age 18 and over there were 93.6 males age 18 and over.

The racial makeup of the county was 85.7% White, 2.4% Black or African American, 0.2% American Indian and Alaska Native, 4.6% Asian, <0.1% Native Hawaiian and Pacific Islander, 1.6% from some other race, and 5.4% from two or more races. Hispanic or Latino residents of any race comprised 4.0% of the population.

87.3% of residents lived in urban areas, while 12.7% lived in rural areas.

There were 60,259 households in the county, of which 35.4% had children under the age of 18 living in them. Of all households, 55.0% were married-couple households, 15.2% were households with a male householder and no spouse or partner present, and 22.7% were households with a female householder and no spouse or partner present. About 22.9% of all households were made up of individuals and 9.7% had someone living alone who was 65 years of age or older.

There were 63,393 housing units, of which 4.9% were vacant. Among occupied housing units, 72.9% were owner-occupied and 27.1% were renter-occupied. The homeowner vacancy rate was 0.9% and the rental vacancy rate was 6.8%.

=== 2010 census ===
As of the 2010 United States census, there were 139,654 people, 52,242 households, and 37,711 families residing in the county. The population density was 435.8 inhabitants per square mile (168.3/km^{2}). There were 56,649 housing units at an average density of 176.8 per square mile (68.3/km^{2}). The racial makeup of the county was 93.9% white, 2.0% Asian, 1.1% black or African American, 0.2% American Indian, 1.2% from other races, and 1.5% from two or more races. Those of Hispanic or Latino origin made up 3.1% of the population. In terms of ancestry, 28.1% were German, 15.7% were Irish, 11.5% were English, and 10.3% were American.

Of the 52,242 households, 37.1% had children under the age of 18 living with them, 57.3% were married couples living together, 10.2% had a female householder with no husband present, 27.8% were non-families, and 22.6% of all households were made up of individuals. The average household size was 2.63 and the average family size was 3.09. The median age was 36.8 years.

The median income for a household in the county was $47,697 and the median income for a family was $72,723. Males had a median income of $52,107 versus $36,029 for females. The per capita income for the county was $28,224. About 5.9% of families and 8.1% of the population were below the poverty line, including 11.1% of those under age 18 and 4.8% of those age 65 or over.

== Education ==
School districts include:

- Center Grove Community School Corporation
- Clark-Pleasant Community School Corporation
- Edinburgh Community School Corporation
- Franklin Community Schools
- Greenwood Community School Corporation
- Nineveh-Hensley-Jackson United School Corporation

== See also ==
- Daily Journal - local daily newspaper
- National Register of Historic Places listings in Johnson County, Indiana
