= National Register of Historic Places listings in Johnson County, Indiana =

Location of Johnson County in Indiana

This is a list of the National Register of Historic Places listings in Johnson County, Indiana.

This is intended to be a complete list of the properties and districts on the National Register of Historic Places in Johnson County, Indiana, United States. Latitude and longitude coordinates are provided for many National Register properties and districts; these locations may be seen together in a map.

There are 22 properties and districts listed on the National Register in the county.

Properties and districts located in incorporated areas display the name of the municipality, while properties and districts in unincorporated areas display the name of their civil township. Properties and districts split between multiple jurisdictions display the names of all jurisdictions.

This National Park Service list is complete through NPS recent listings posted September 26, 2025.

== Current listings ==
	Name on the Register	Image	Date listed	Location	City or town	Description
1	Bagby-Doub Farmstead	Bagby-Doub Farmstead	March 8, 2021 (#100006200)	308 Worthsville Rd. 39°35′10″N 86°06′56″W	Greenwood vicinity	
2	Bethel African Methodist Episcopal Church	Bethel African Methodist Episcopal Church	December 15, 2015 (#15000886)	499 W. Madison St. 39°28′52″N 86°03′42″W	Franklin	
3	Edinburgh Commercial Historic District	Edinburgh Commercial Historic District	June 28, 1991 (#91000789)	Roughly bounded by Thompson and Main Sts., the alley north of Main Cross St., and the former Conrail railroad tracks 39°21′14″N 85°57′57″W	Edinburgh	
4	Franklin College Historic District	Franklin College Historic District	November 19, 2024 (#100011041)	Roughly bounded by East Monroe Street on the north, South Forsythe Street on the east, Grizzly Drive and Park Avenue on the south, and Branigin Boulevard on the west. 39°28′44″N 86°03′36″W	Franklin	
5	Franklin College Library (Shirk Hall)	Franklin College Library (Shirk Hall)	October 29, 1975 (#75000021)	600 E. Monroe St. 39°28′43″N 86°02′51″W	Franklin	
6	Franklin College-Old Main	Franklin College-Old Main	October 29, 1975 (#75000022)	600 E. Monroe St. 39°28′46″N 86°02′50″W	Franklin	
7	Franklin Commercial Historic District	Franklin Commercial Historic District	July 13, 1989 (#89000773)	Roughly E. and W. Court St. and Jefferson, Monroe, and Main; 39°28′48″N 86°03′19″W	Franklin	
8	Franklin Senior High School	Franklin Senior High School	December 17, 2012 (#12001058)	550 E. Jefferson St. 39°28′52″N 86°02′54″W	Franklin	
9	Furnas Mill Bridge	Furnas Mill Bridge	September 16, 2001 (#01000985)	Pisgah Rd. over Sugar Creek-Atterbury Fish and Wildlife Area, northwest of Edinburgh; 39°22′56″N 85°59′53″W	Blue River Township	
10	Greenlawn Cemetery	Greenlawn Cemetery	June 25, 2013 (#13000421)	100 W. South St. 39°28′40″N 86°03′36″W	Franklin	
11	Greenwood Commercial Historic District	Greenwood Commercial Historic District	June 14, 1991 (#91000792)	172-332 W. Main St. and 147-211 S. Madison Ave. 39°36′50″N 86°06′35″W	Greenwood	
12	Greenwood Residential Historic District	Greenwood Residential Historic District	June 12, 2017 (#100001059)	Roughly bounded by Meridian, McKinley, Perry, and Main Sts., and Euclid and Longdon Aves. 39°36′58″N 86°06′38″W	Greenwood	
13	Heck-Hasler House	Heck-Hasler House	March 15, 2000 (#00000204)	6612 N. 575E, northeast of Franklin; 39°34′35″N 85°59′41″W	Clark Township	
14	Herriott House	Herriott House	July 15, 1982 (#82000044)	696 N. Main St. 39°29′12″N 86°03′24″W	Franklin	
15	Hopewell Presbyterian Church	Hopewell Presbyterian Church	June 15, 2000 (#00000680)	548 W. 100N, west of Franklin; 39°29′36″N 86°07′00″W	Franklin Township	
16	Johnson County Courthouse Square	Johnson County Courthouse Square	April 16, 1981 (#81000017)	Courthouse Square; 39°28′48″N 86°03′18″W	Franklin	
17	Martin Place Historic District	Martin Place Historic District	June 12, 1987 (#87000951)	Northern and southern sides of Martin Pl. between Graham St. and Water St., and 500, 498, and 450 N. Main St. 39°29′07″N 86°03′16″W	Franklin	
18	Masonic Temple	Masonic Temple	December 27, 1991 (#91001863)	135 N. Main St. 39°28′55″N 86°03′17″W	Franklin	
19	South Walnut Street Historic District	South Walnut Street Historic District	March 21, 2011 (#11000126)	Roughly both sides of S. Walnut St. from Thompson St. south to 507 and 514 S. Walnut, plus the 100 block of W. Campbell; 39°21′05″N 85°57′59″W	Edinburgh	
20	Toner Historic District	Toner Historic District	March 21, 2011 (#11000127)	E. Main Cross from the CSX tracks to White Oak Ln. 39°21′16″N 85°57′35″W	Edinburgh	
21	Van Nuys Farm	Van Nuys Farm	February 12, 1987 (#87000100)	State Road 144, northwest of Hopewell; 39°29′58″N 86°07′09″W	Franklin Township	
22	August Zeppenfeld House	August Zeppenfeld House	December 30, 1987 (#87002188)	300 W. Jefferson St. 39°28′50″N 86°03′33″W	Franklin	

== See also ==
- List of National Historic Landmarks in Indiana
- National Register of Historic Places listings in Indiana
- Listings in neighboring counties: Bartholomew, Brown, Marion, Morgan, Shelby
- List of Indiana state historical markers in Johnson County
