= Artcraft Theatre =

Movie theater in Franklin, Indiana

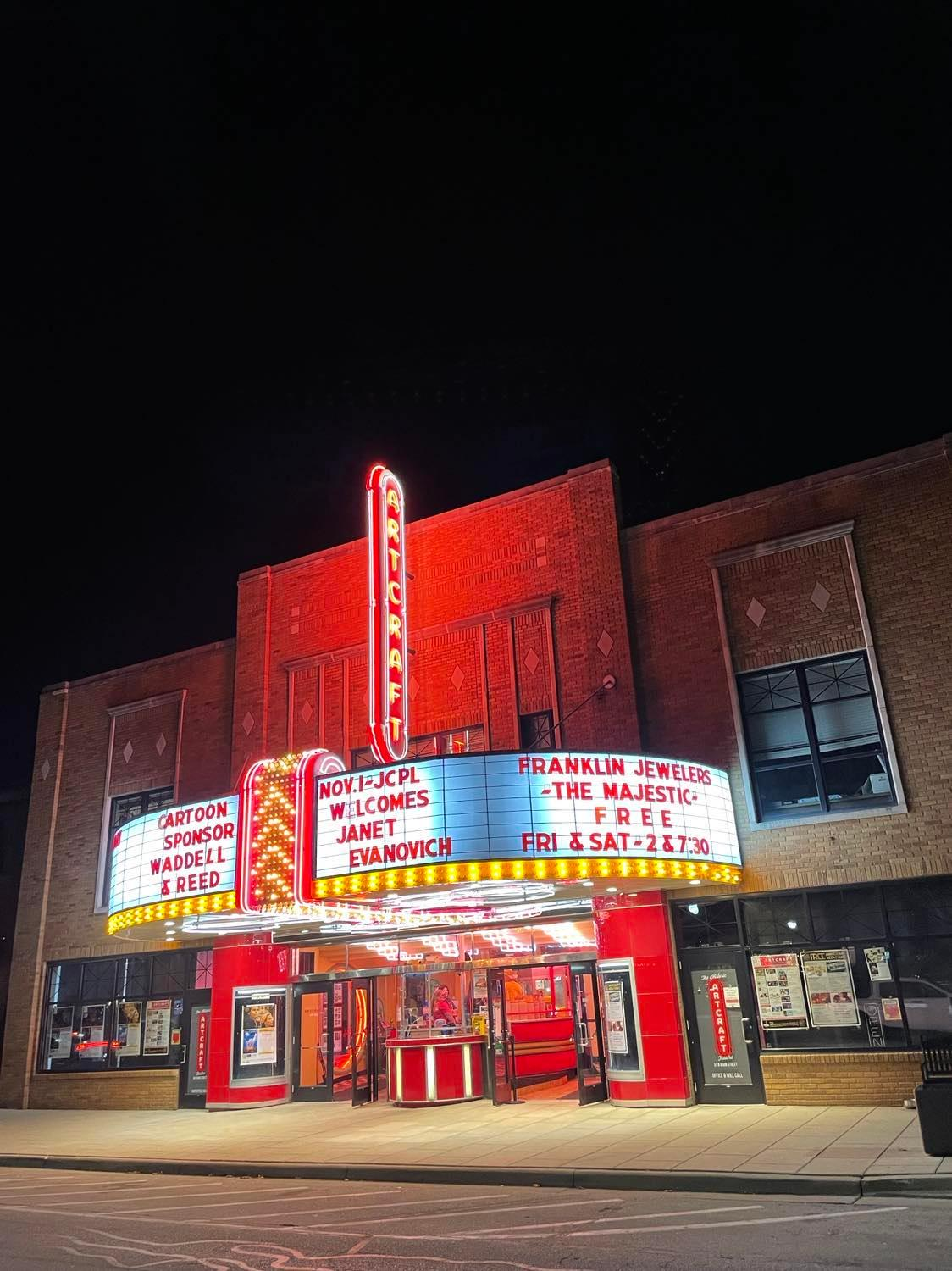

- Location within Indiana
- Address: 57 N. Main St; Franklin, Indiana; United States
- Coordinates: 39.481161°N 86.055017°W
- Owner: Franklin Heritage, Inc.
- Seating type: Festival Seating
- Capacity: 625
- Type: Movie theater
- Screen: 1
- Designation: National Register of Historic Places
- Current use: Movie theater and concert venue

Construction
- Opened: November 1st, 1922
- Renovated: 1936, 1940, 1948-1952
- Closed: May, 2000
- Reopened: 2004
- Years active: 1922 - present
- Architect: Roy C. Bryant
- Structural engineer: Arsee Engineering

Website
- Official website

The Historic Artcraft Theatre is a movie theater in Franklin, Indiana in the United States. The theater operated as a first-run movie theater continuously for 78 years before closing. It was the headquarters for Syndicate Theatre's cinema network from 1936 to 2000. Saved from demolition by historic preservation group Franklin Heritage Inc., the theater shows classic movies and hosts concerts as the group restores the Artcraft and other local buildings. The Artcraft is one of the best examples of an art deco theatre in Indiana.

== History ==
Opening its doors on November 1, 1922, the Artcraft was the first theater in Franklin built to show movies. It was built in the neo-classical style without a marquee or blade sign. Located across the street from the interurban railway station, the Artcraft was ideal to bring in vaudeville troupes. The Artcraft also showed silent movies from 1922 to 1929. During that time the orchestra pit in front of the stage housed any musicians needed to accompany films. Many area high schools and Franklin College performed plays and hosted commencements ceremonies on the Artcraft stage throughout the 1920s and 1930s.

The Rembusch family from Shelbyville, Indiana leased the Artcraft in 1928 and bought the theater in 1936. The Rembusch family installed sound at the Artcraft on October 28, 1929. The first talkie was Fox's Follies of 1929. In 1935 they added the first air-conditioning system in Franklin using a swamp cooling system. During the Great Depression, many American families turned to cheap entertainment at the movies to keep a sense of normality. The Artcraft joined the popular Cash or Bank Nite lottery. Bank Nite continued at the Artcraft through the 1950s. The Rembusches added a 2 line A-framed marquee and blade sign in 1940. They added walnut and agate-colored vitrolite glass on the lower front façade around the poster cases. Because of Franklin's idyllic community and its appearance of recovery from the Great Depression, LIFE Magazine chose Franklin as the feature for its photo-essay on a small town's Saturday night. The issue was photographed in October 1940. written by Bernard Hoffman, and published in the December 1940 edition.

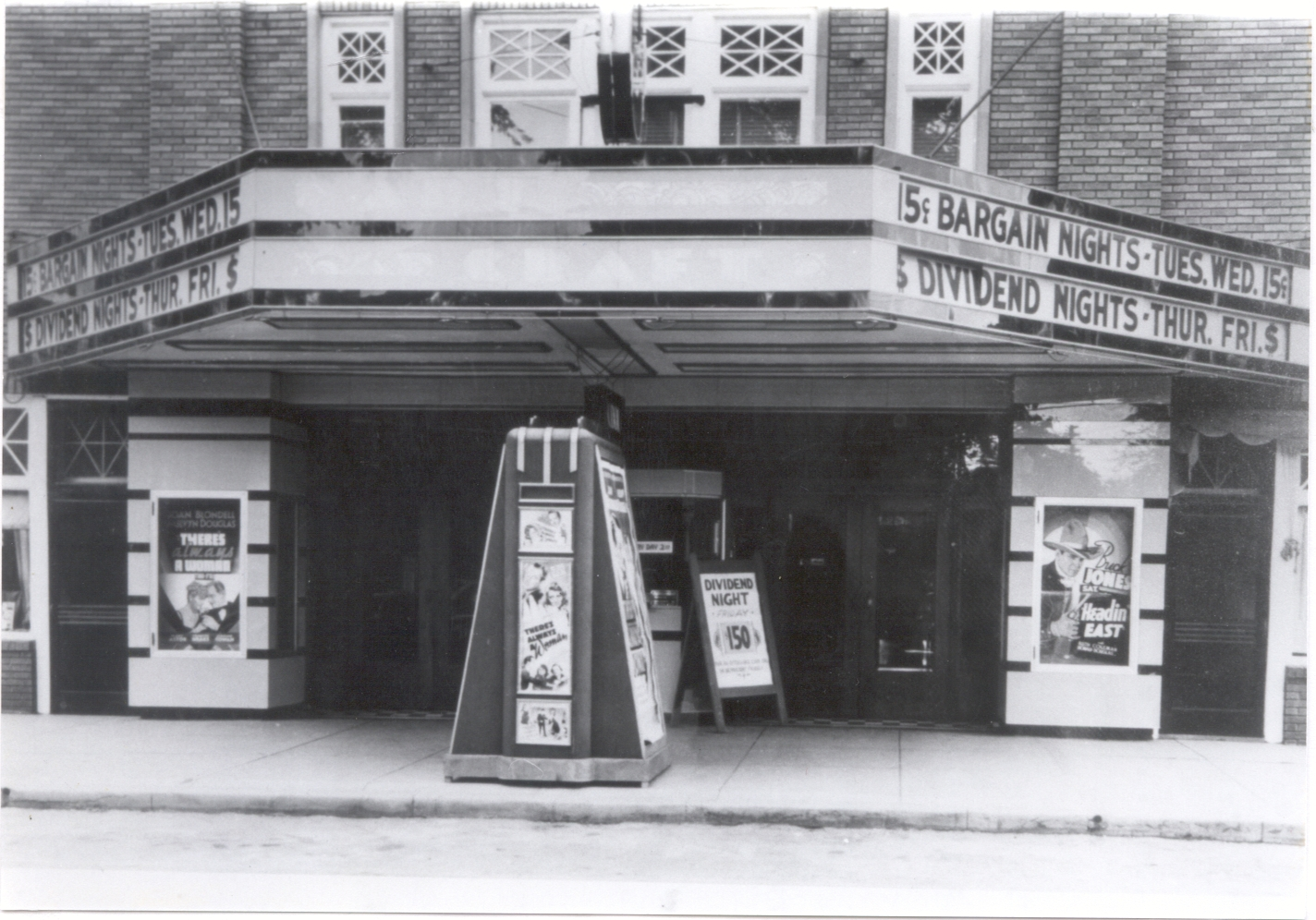
The newly added marquee in the 1940s.

During World War II, the Artcraft supported the domestic front of the war by conducting scrap metal drives and sponsoring War Bond drives and providing contributors with a free movie pass. Trueman T. Rembusch hired architect Alden Miranda to draw up plans for a fresh look at the Artcraft. Work began on the art deco renovation in 1948 and finished with a new screen installment in 1953. The art deco renovation included streamlining the whole front façade and lobby. Crews installed neon lights, reflective mirror tile, and rounded every 90° angle in the building. The new marquee included a waterfall-light pattern as well as multiple illuminated lines. The renovation ended with the orchestra pit being filled with sand and concrete and with a new curved screen being mounted to the stage floor. These projects changed the trajectory of Artcraft away from live events and toward primarily showing movies.

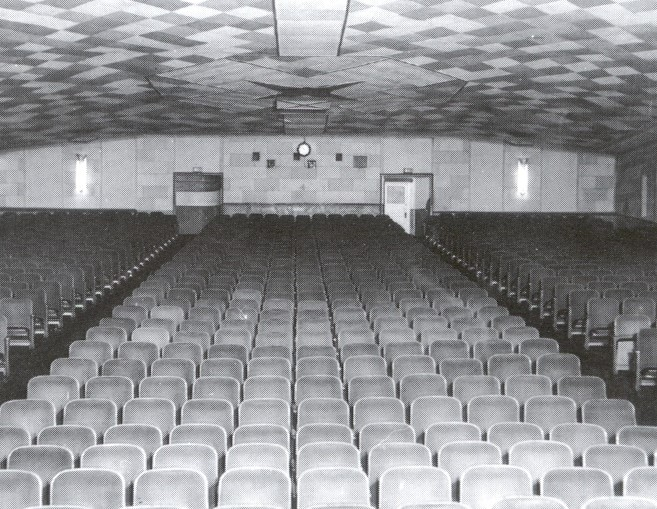
The auditorium of the Artcraft following the art deco renovation.

The Artcraft remained the only operating theater in Franklin during the 1960s-2000.

The late 1980s and early 1990s saw the introduction of multiplex theaters across the United States. Kerasotes Theatres began plans to build a multiplex in Franklin. Michael Rembusch decided that his mono-plex could not compete with a multiplex so he built Canary Creek Cinemas in Franklin to out-compete the Kerasotes planned theater. Rembusch decided he could not operate two theatres in the same city made the decision to close and sell the Artcraft. The Artcraft showed Gone with the Wind as its last movie after operating continuously for 78 years in May 2000.

Bob Schofield, a local businessman and owner of the Willard Restaurant, bought the Artcraft with hopes of attracting a younger generation to come back to the downtown area. He operated an ice cream shop, hosted concerts, and began an under-21 dance club. In May 2001, during one dance club night the southwest portion of the auditorium's ceiling collapsed. After repairing the collapse, a brief period of normal activity returned. Structural engineers condemned the building for electrical and structural reasons in August 2003. Unable to launch a massive campaign to repair the Artcraft, Bob Schofield agreed to Franklin Heritage Inc.'s offer to buy the Artcraft.

== Franklin Heritage, Inc. Restoration ==
In 2001, the historic preservation group Franklin Heritage, Inc. (FHI). decided to start renting the Artcraft to provide extra funds for restoration work and upkeep. Franklin Heritage, Inc.'s "Classic Film on a Classic Screen" campaign started on September 13, 2001, with a showing of From Here to Eternity. The patriotic film depicting America under attack at Pearl Harbor resonated with the recently shocked patrons following the terrorist attacks of September 11th. FHI continued to rent the building one Thursday and later one weekend a month.

After purchasing the Artcraft with the support of the Johnson County Community Foundation, FHI began their "Marquee Project" of restoring the Artcraft to the height of its art deco style. FHI launched a $500,000 campaign to renovate the building. In 2006, FHI received a state historic preservation grant towards the restoration of the theater. The restoration of the Artcraft occurs in tangent with other preservation projects that FHI undertakes. The Artcraft celebrated its 100th anniversary on November 1, 2022.

Today the theater hosts movie showings of classic films, that are 10 years old or older. The staff pick a wide selection of films that are iconic, well made, cult-classics and that they think people should see. The Artcraft partners with many local and regional organizations to bring the programming to the area including its long-standing run of Heartland International Film Festival's "Best of the Fest" events.

== Architecture ==
The building includes a full stage and orchestra pit originally intended for vaudeville performances. The Artcraft was built in the neoclassical style and did not originally have a marquee. A set of two original stage flats in a forest motif are still housed backstage. The theater was purchased by Trueman Rembusch in 1936, who facilitated the theaters first renovation in 1936. In 1948, it underwent a second renovation in the Art Deco style that is representative of American movie theaters.

== Awards and news ==
- In 2015, the theater was chosen as one of the "4 Favorite Restored Small-Town Cinemas" by Midwest Living.
- Franklin was awarded the Best Main Street in Indiana by Visit Indiana in 2019 in part because of the rejuvenation brought by the Artcraft.
- The Artcraft is listed in the National Register of Historic Places as a contributing resource in the Franklin Commercial Historic District.
