= Johnson County Museum of History =

- Masonic Temple
- U.S. National Register of Historic Places
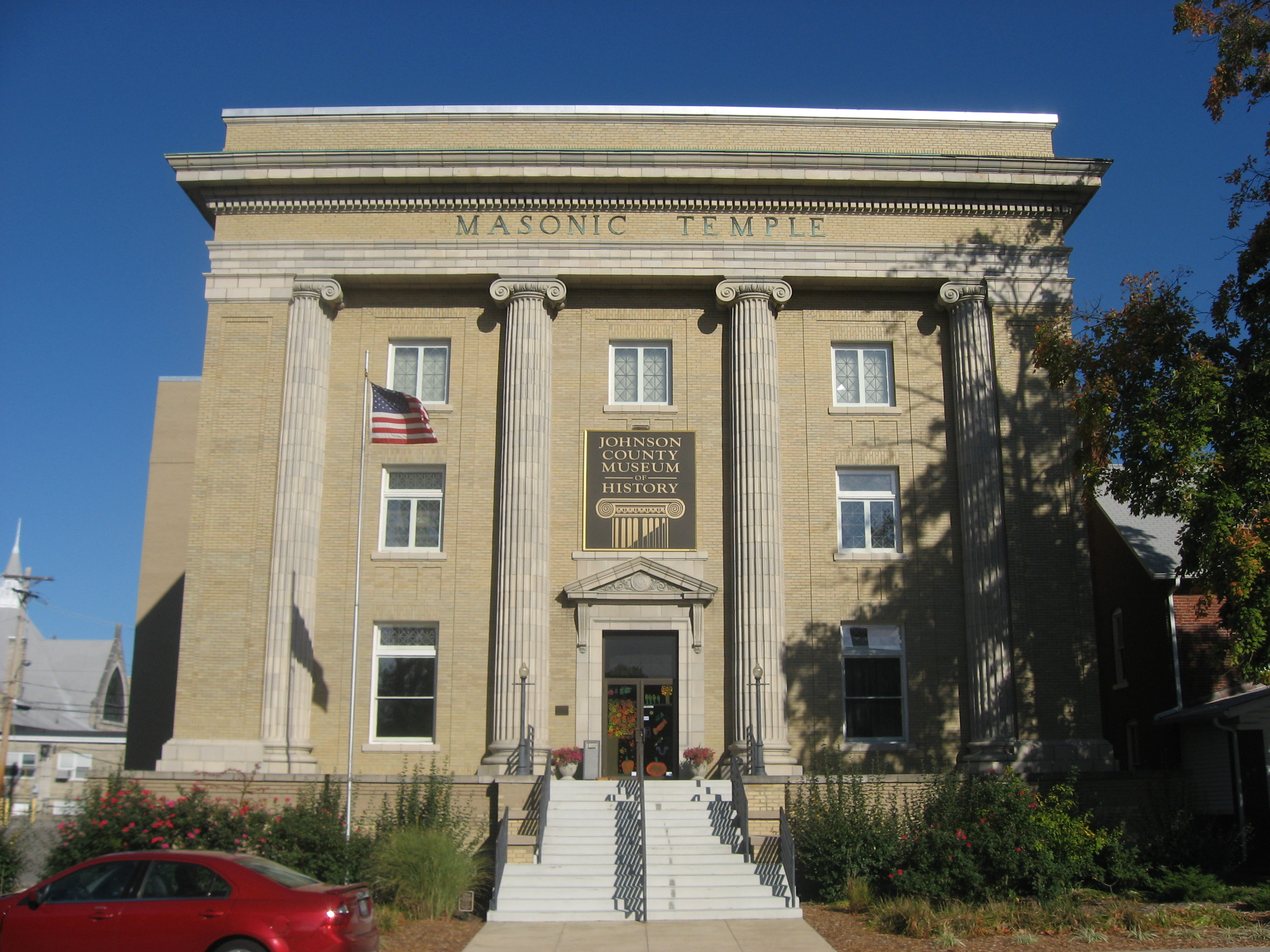
- Front of the building

- Location within Indiana Location within the United States
- Location: 135 N. Main St., Franklin, Indiana
- Coordinates: 39°28′55″N 86°3′17″W
- Area: less than one acre
- Built: 1924
- Architect: Shopbell & Co.; Bryant, Roy C. & Co.
- Architectural style: Classical Revival
- NRHP reference No.: 91001863
- Added to NRHP: December 27, 1991

The Johnson County Museum of History is a local historical museum located in Franklin, Indiana. The museum is run by the Johnson County Historical Society. The museum officially opened in 1931, under the name "Johnson County Museum." It was organized by the local Chapter of the Daughters of the American Revolution.

Originally located in a small room at the county courthouse, the museum has grown over the years, making it necessary to relocate. In 1962 it moved to the Suckow home, and in 1989 it moved again to its current building.

== About the Museum ==
The Johnson County Museum of History has been in existence since 1931. Originally, historical artifacts were on display in store windows in downtown Franklin. The local chapter of the Daughters of the American Revolution were able to organize efforts for a museum in 1931.

The original museum was located in a small room at the Johnson County Courthouse. The gallery was later moved to the Suckow home in Franklin in 1963. In 1989 Johnson County officials along with the Johnson County Historical Society combined to purchase the former Masonic Temple in Franklin located at 135 Main Street, and moved into the space in 1991. The museum is currently operating at the same address.

The museum currently offers permanent and seasonal exhibits, various programs and events, a genealogy library with original Johnson County and surrounding area records, a gift shop, and an 1830s cabin located next to the museum.

== Permanent Exhibits ==
- Early Inhabitants: Contains Native American artifacts, tools, weapons, and fur trade items.
- Johnson County Pioneer Settlers: Contains original artifacts, Conestoga wagon reproduction, a replica fiddler with playable audio, and replica children's clothing.
- Victorian Life: Contains a Victorian Parlor reproduction complete with clothing, furniture, and accessories.
- Indiana Infantry in the Civil War: Contains original photographs and Civil War regalia, equipment and weaponry used in the war, and a mock encampment scene.
- Serving County and Country: Contains memorabilia from the Spanish–American War to present day, historic items and photographs, authentic World War II attire, and historical contents from Camp Atterbury in nearby Edinburgh, Indiana.
- The Fabulous '50s: Contains a replica diner scene, 1953 Chrysler Imperial, drive-in marquee, authentic 1950s popcorn machine used in the Artcraft Theatre, and other 1950s regalia.
- Artwork: Includes works of art from local Johnson County artists past and present.

== Genealogy Library ==
The museum has access to Johnson County records resources. The records include marriage record books, guardianship records, tax records, court records, inventory and sales records, military and veteran records, school yearbooks and records, local township records, written town histories, cemetery records, church records, oral histories, records from 28 surrounding counties and 11 states, and more.

== Building ==
The museum's current building was designed by the architecture firm Shopbell, Fowler, and Thole and constructed as a Masonic Temple between 1922 and 1924 by Franklin Lodge No. 107 (a lodge of Freemasons) who used it as their meeting place until 1987.

The building was listed on the National Register of Historic Places in 1991. Although it had already been converted to a museum by that time, it is listed under the name Masonic Temple in the register.

== See also ==
- List of Masonic buildings in Indiana
- National Register of Historic Places listings in Johnson County, Indiana
