= Järrel =

Järrel or Jarrel is a surname. Notable people with the surname include:

- Henrik S. Järrel, Swedish television personality and former politician
- Stig Järrel, Swedish actor
- W. A. Jarrel (1849–1927), American evangelist and author
