= List of Indiana state historical markers in Johnson County =

Map showing location of Johnson County, Indiana

This is a list of the Indiana state historical markers in Johnson County.

This is intended to be a complete list of the official state historical markers placed in Johnson County, Indiana, United States by the Indiana Historical Bureau. The locations of the historical markers and their latitude and longitude coordinates are included below when available, along with their names, years of placement, and topics as recorded by the Historical Bureau. There are 5 standing historical markers located in Johnson County.

== Historical markers ==
Name	Image	Year	Location	Topic
Birthplace of Paul Vories McNutt		1992	200 Walnut St, Franklin 39.482617°N 86.059467°W	Education, Government and Politics
Birthplace of Roger D. Branigin		2000	250 Yandes St, Franklin 39.483217°N 86.049967°W	Civil Rights, Government and Politics, Education
William Merritt Chase		2010	7784 S. Georgetown Rd., Nineveh; 39°21′44″N 86°05′02″W	Arts & Culture
Franklin Wonder Five		2020	642-674 Grizzly Dr., on the east side of the Franklin College Fitness Center, Franklin; 39°28′41.2″N 86°02′46.7″W	Sports
Ray Crowe, 1915-2003		2023	50 Center St., Whiteland; 39°33′01″N 86°04′48″W	Sports, Education, Politics

== See also ==
- List of Indiana state historical markers
- National Register of Historic Places listings in Johnson County, Indiana
