= Old Main (Franklin College) =

- Franklin College-Old Main
- U.S. National Register of Historic Places
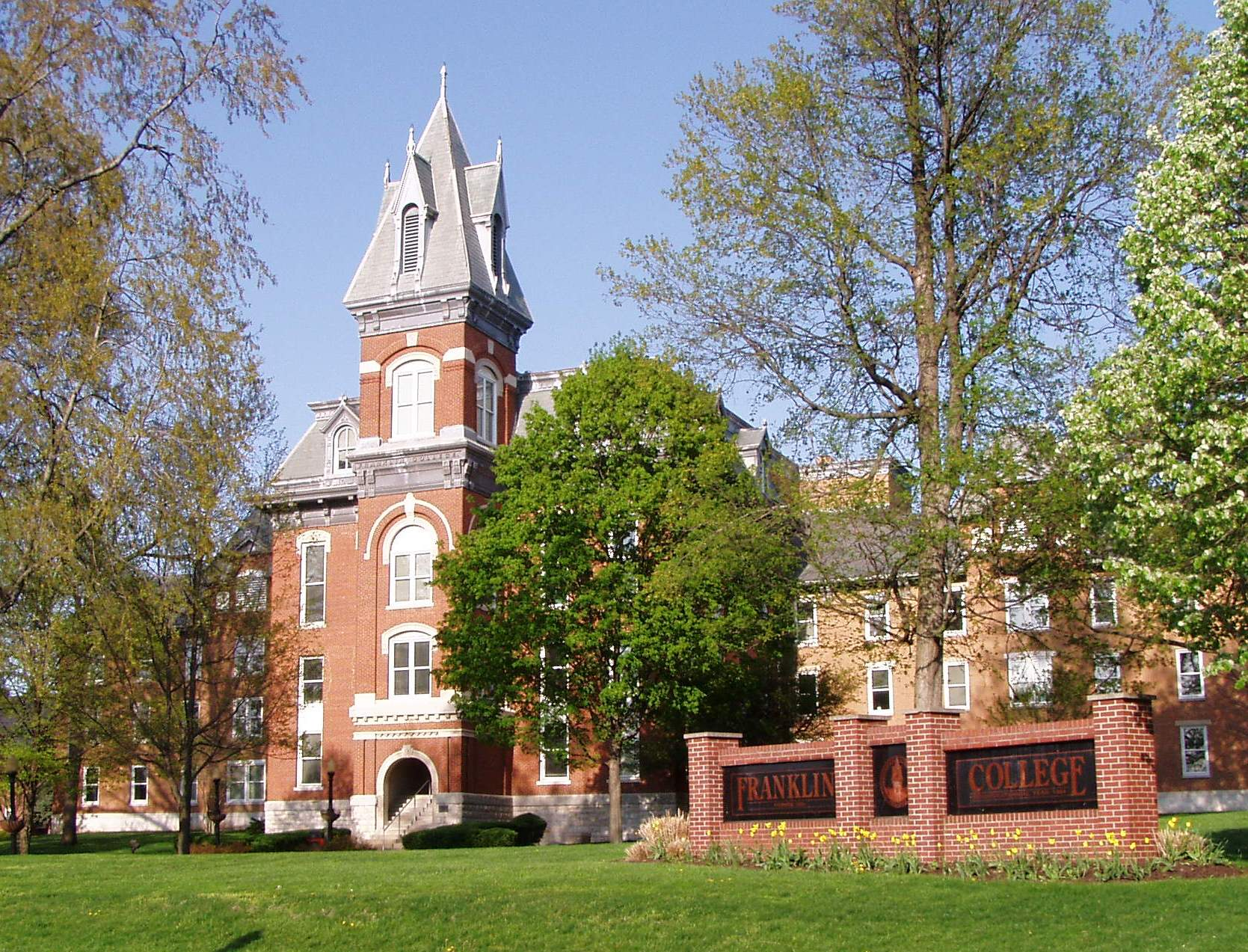
- Old Main at Franklin College, April 2008

- Location within Indiana Location within the United States
- Location: 600 E. Monroe St., Franklin, Indiana
- Coordinates: 39°28′46″N 86°2′50″W
- Area: 0.1 acres (0.040 ha)
- Built: 1847, 1855, 1888
- Architectural style: Late Victorian
- NRHP reference No.: 75000022
- Added to NRHP: October 29, 1975

Franklin College-Old Main is a historic academic building located on the campus of Franklin College in Franklin, Indiana. The building consists of three sections: the north wing constructed in 1847, the south wing constructed in 1855, and the middle section connecting the two wings in 1888. The wings are each three stories tall, while the middle section is four stories and topped by a bell tower and observatory. The building is in a Late Victorian / Gothic style.

It was listed on the National Register of Historic Places in 1975.
