= Hopewell Presbyterian Church (Hopewell, Johnson County, Indiana) =

Historic church in Indiana, United States

- U.S. National Register of Historic Places
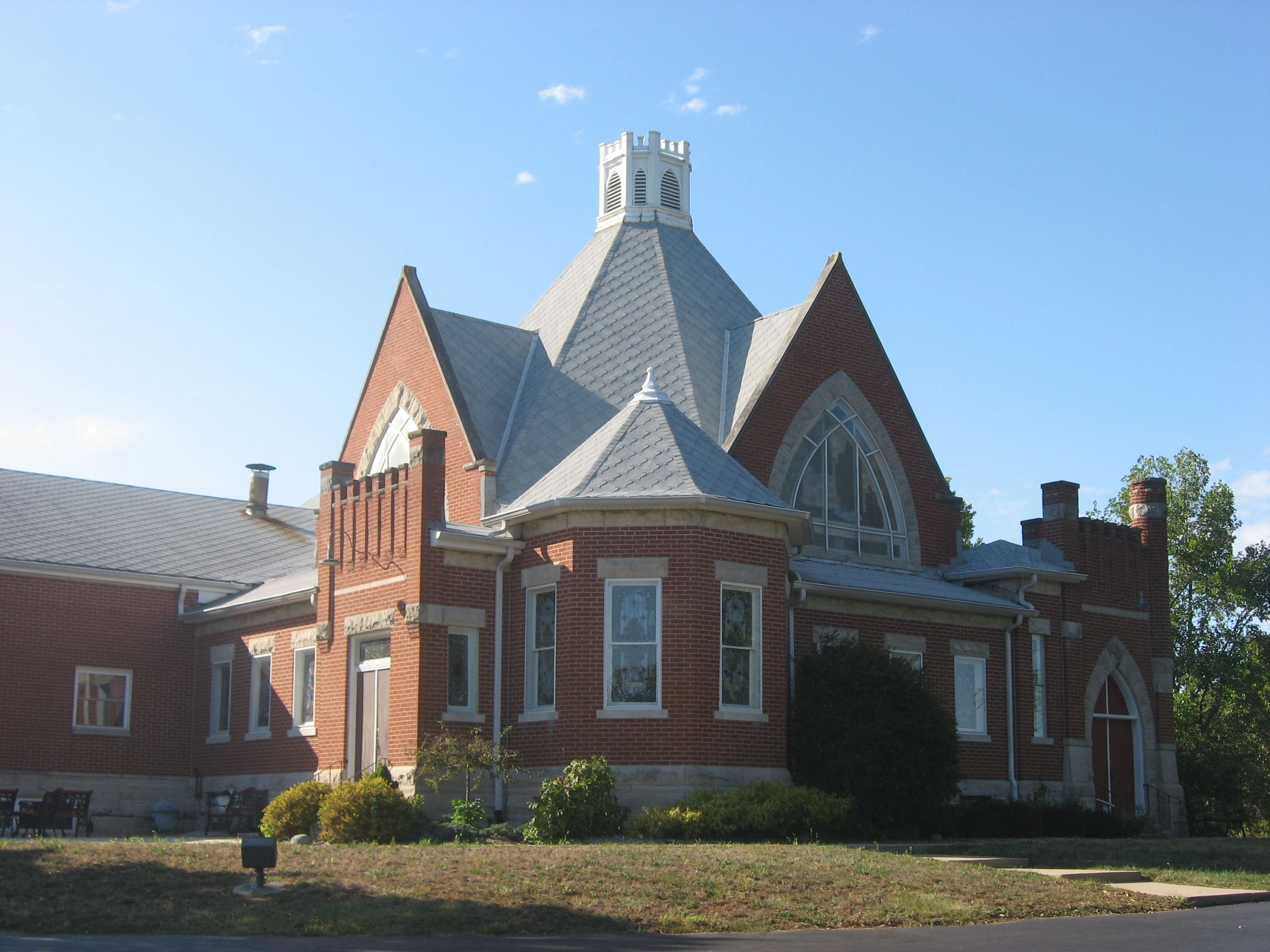

- Location within Indiana Location within the United States
- Location: 548 W. 100N, west of Franklin in Franklin Township, Johnson County, Indiana
- Coordinates: 39°29′36″N 86°7′0″W
- Area: less than one acre
- Built: 1902, 1927, 1958
- Architect: George Anderson
- Architectural style: Gothic, Akron Plan
- NRHP reference No.: 00000680
- Added to NRHP: June 15, 2000

Hopewell Presbyterian Church is a historic Presbyterian church located in Franklin Township, Johnson County, Indiana, United States. It was built in 1902, and is a two-story, Gothic Revival style Akron Plan design church. It is topped by an octagonal dome and features pointed arches, crenelation, and steeply pitched roof. A one-story hip roofed addition was built in 1927, and another one-story addition in 1958.

It was listed on the National Register of Historic Places in 2000.
