= Blue River Township, Johnson County, Indiana =

Blue River Township
- Township
- Coordinates: 39°23′26″N 85°59′30″W
- Country: United States
- State: Indiana
- County: Johnson

Government
  - Type: Indiana township

Area
  - Total: 24.44 sq mi (63.3 km^{2})
  - Land: 24.28 sq mi (62.9 km^{2})
  - Water: 0.16 sq mi (0.41 km^{2})
- Elevation: 709 ft (216 m)

Population (2020)
  - Total: 4,837
  - Density: 203.3/sq mi (78.5/km^{2})
- FIPS code: 18-06094
- GNIS feature ID: 453120

Blue River Township is one of nine townships in Johnson County, Indiana, United States. As of the 2010 census, its population was 4,936 and it contained 2,096 housing units.

== History ==
The Furnas Mill Bridge was listed on the National Register of Historic Places in 2001.

== Geography ==
According to the 2010 census, the township has a total area of 24.44 square miles (63.3 km^{2}), of which 24.28 square miles (62.9 km^{2}) (or 99.35%) is land and 0.16 square miles (0.41 km^{2}) (or 0.65%) is water.
