= Herriott House =

Historic house in Indiana, United States

- U.S. National Register of Historic Places
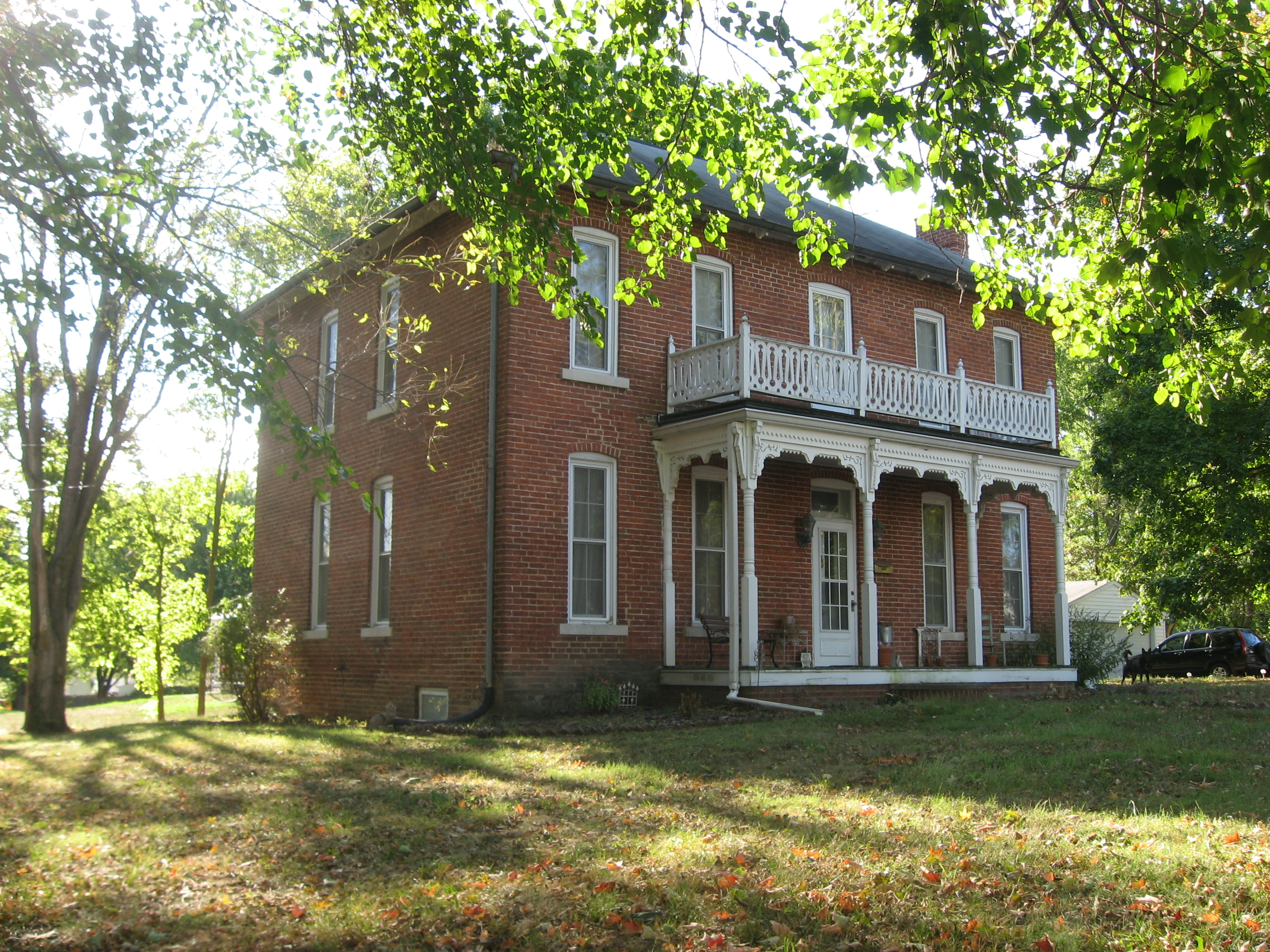
- Herriott House, September 2010

- Location within Indiana Location within the United States
- Location: 696 N. Main St., Franklin, Indiana
- Coordinates: 39°29′12″N 86°3′24″W
- Area: less than one acre
- Built: 1860-1865
- Built by: Herriott, John
- Architectural style: Italianate
- NRHP reference No.: 82000044
- Added to NRHP: July 15, 1982

Herriott House, also known as the Brown-Ritchey House, is a historic home located in Franklin, Indiana. The house was built between 1860 and 1865, and is a two-story, rectangular, Italianate style brick dwelling with a hipped roof. It features an elaborate wooden front porch added between 1876 and 1884 (rebuilt 1981) and overhanging eaves with decorative brackets.

It was listed on the National Register of Historic Places in 1982.
