= Franklin Commercial Historic District =

Historic district in Indiana, United States

- U.S. National Register of Historic Places
- U.S. Historic district
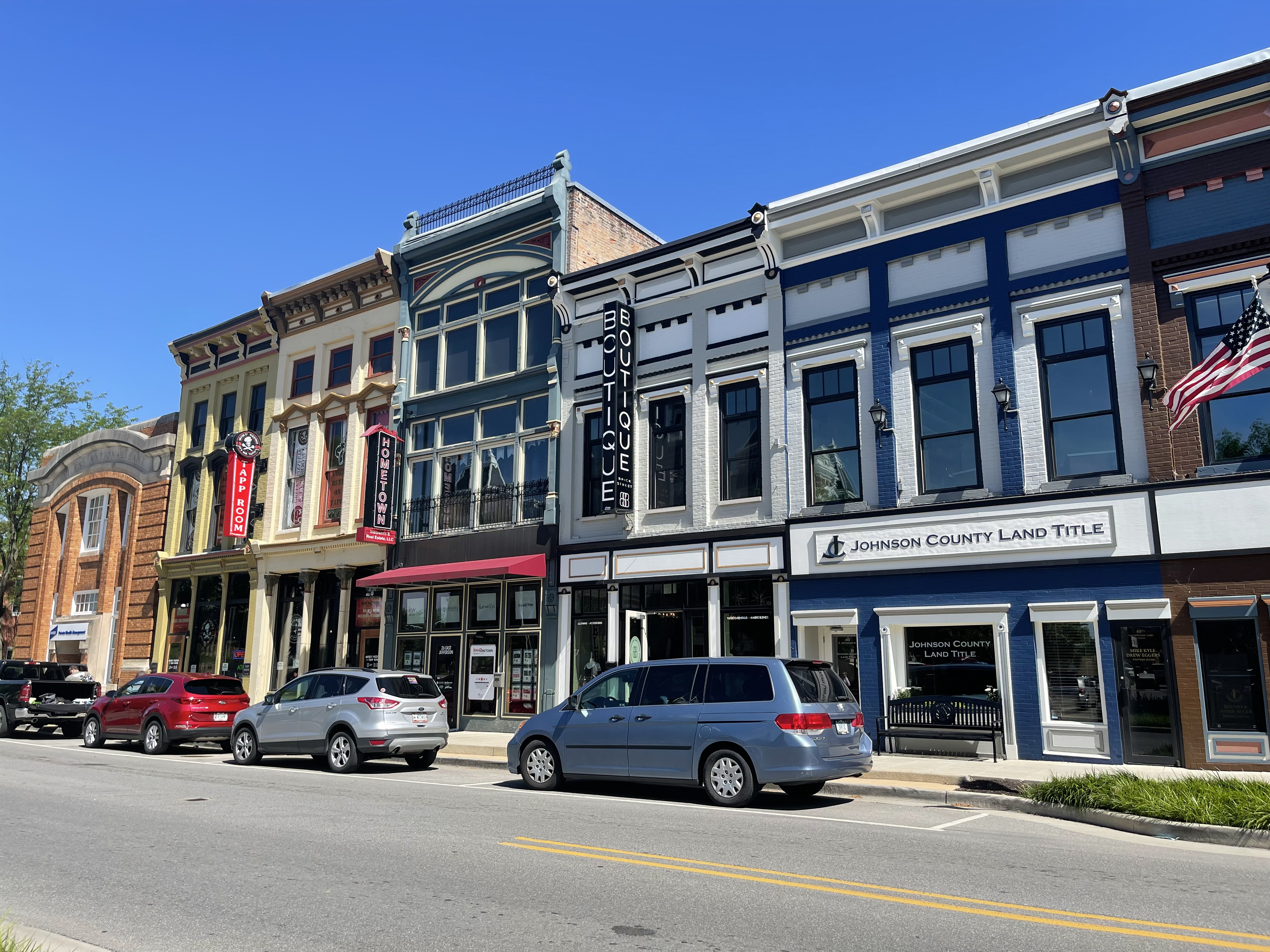
- The district in 2022

- Location within Indiana Location within the United States
- Location: Roughly E. & W. Court St., Jefferson, Monroe, Main, Franklin, Indiana
- Coordinates: 39°28′48″N 86°3′19″W
- Area: 7 acres (2.8 ha)
- Architect: Bunting, George
- Architectural style: Classical Revival, Italianate, Romanesque
- NRHP reference No.: 89000773
- Added to NRHP: July 13, 1989

Franklin Commercial Historic District is a national historic district located at Franklin, Indiana. The district encompasses 32 contributing buildings in the central business district of Franklin. It developed between about 1850 and 1935, and includes notable examples of Italianate, Romanesque, and Classical Revival style architecture. Located in the district is the separately listed Johnson County Courthouse. Other notable buildings include the Herriott-Clarke Building (1853), former City Hall and Opera House (1895), Artcraft Theater (1924), and Wigwam Mineola Tribe Building (c. 1915).

It was listed on the National Register of Historic Places in 1989.

== Gallery ==
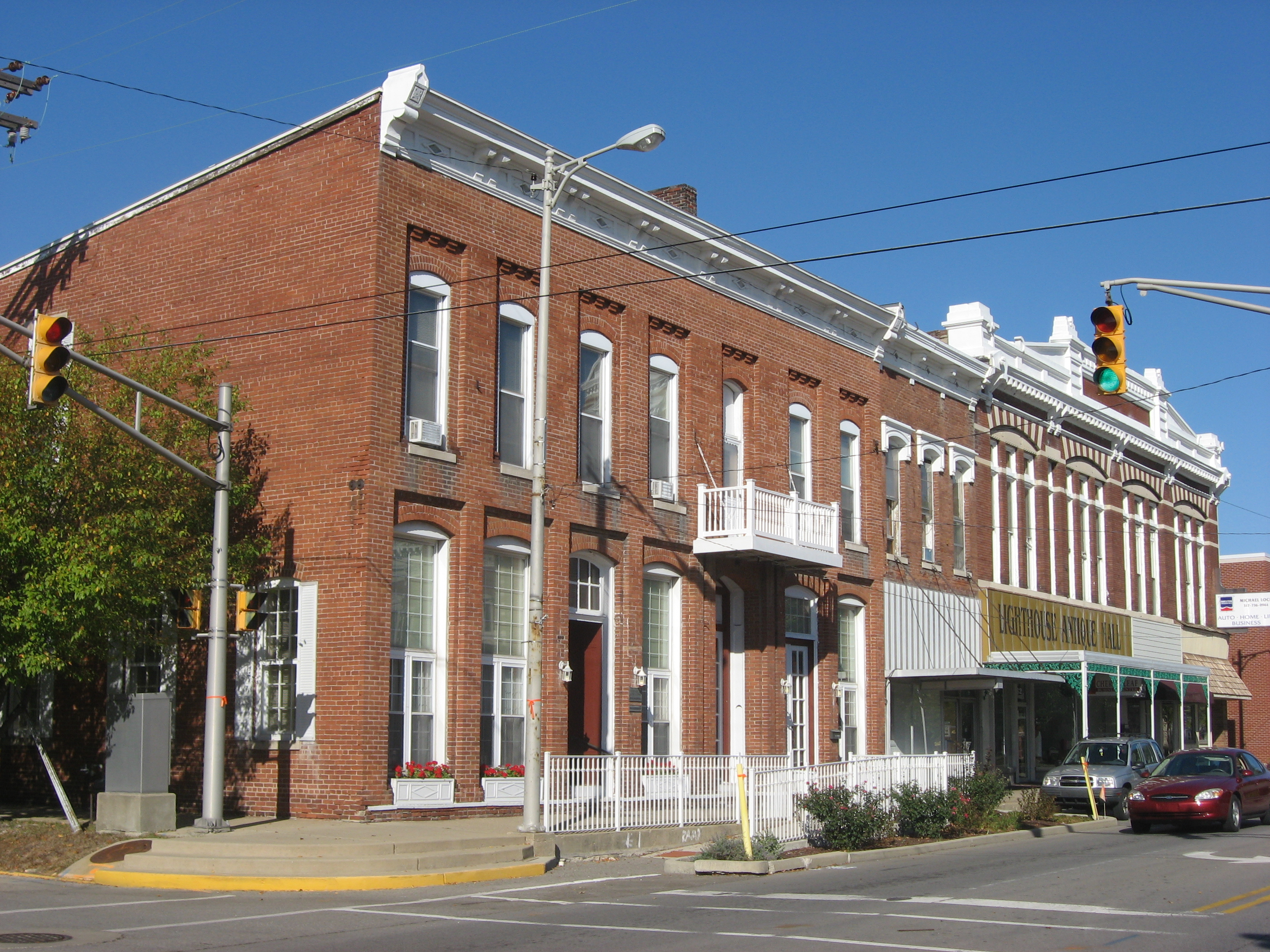
Jackson & Jefferson Streets

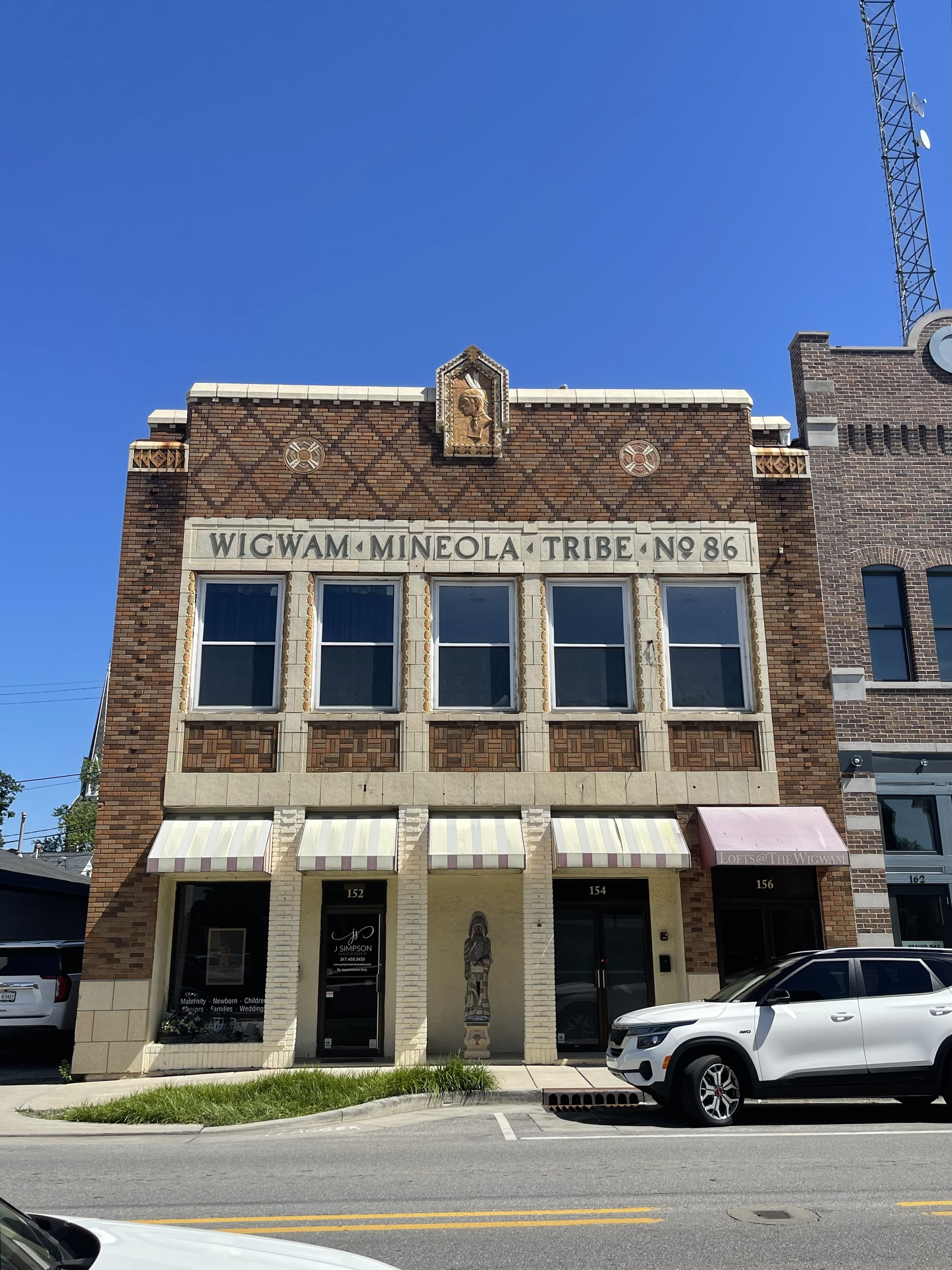
Red Men Wigwam
