= Bethel African Methodist Episcopal Church (Franklin, Indiana) =

Historic church in Indiana, United States

- U.S. National Register of Historic Places
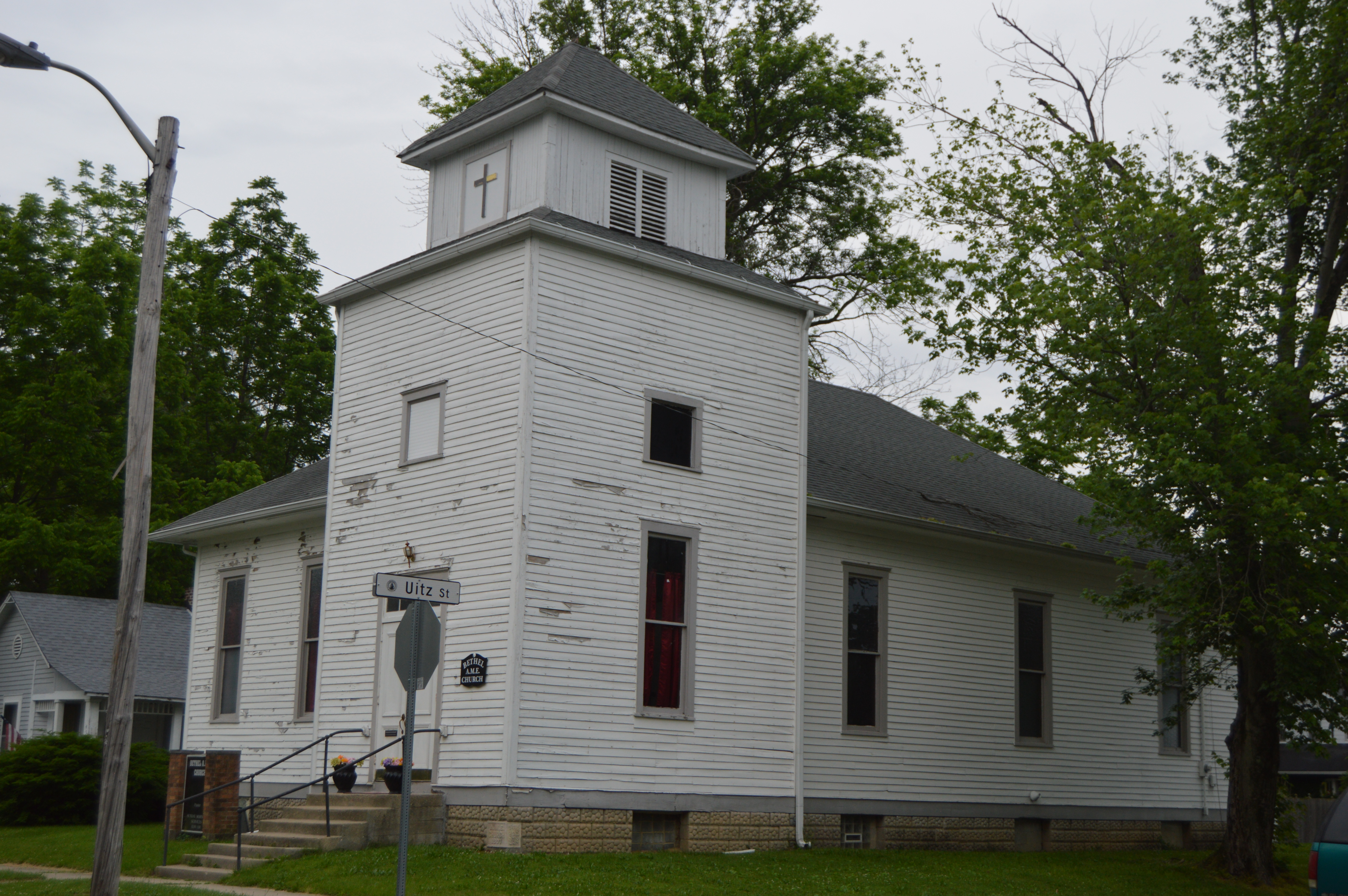
- Front and western side

- Location within Indiana Location within the United States
- Location: 499 W. Madison St., Franklin, Indiana
- Coordinates: 39°28′53″N 86°03′41″W
- Area: Less than 1 acre (0.40 ha)
- Architect: McGuire & Shook
- Architectural style: Italian Renaissance
- NRHP reference No.: 15000886
- Added to NRHP: December 15, 2015

Bethel African Methodist Episcopal Church is a historic African Methodist Episcopal church and parsonage located at Franklin, Indiana. The church was built in 1911, and is a one-story, front-gable frame building with a medium-pitched gable on hip roof. It features a simple two-story square tower topped by a square cupola and a large projecting semi-hexagonal apse. The associated parsonage was built about 1925.

It was listed on the National Register of Historic Places in 2015.
