= Van Nuys Farm =

- U.S. National Register of Historic Places
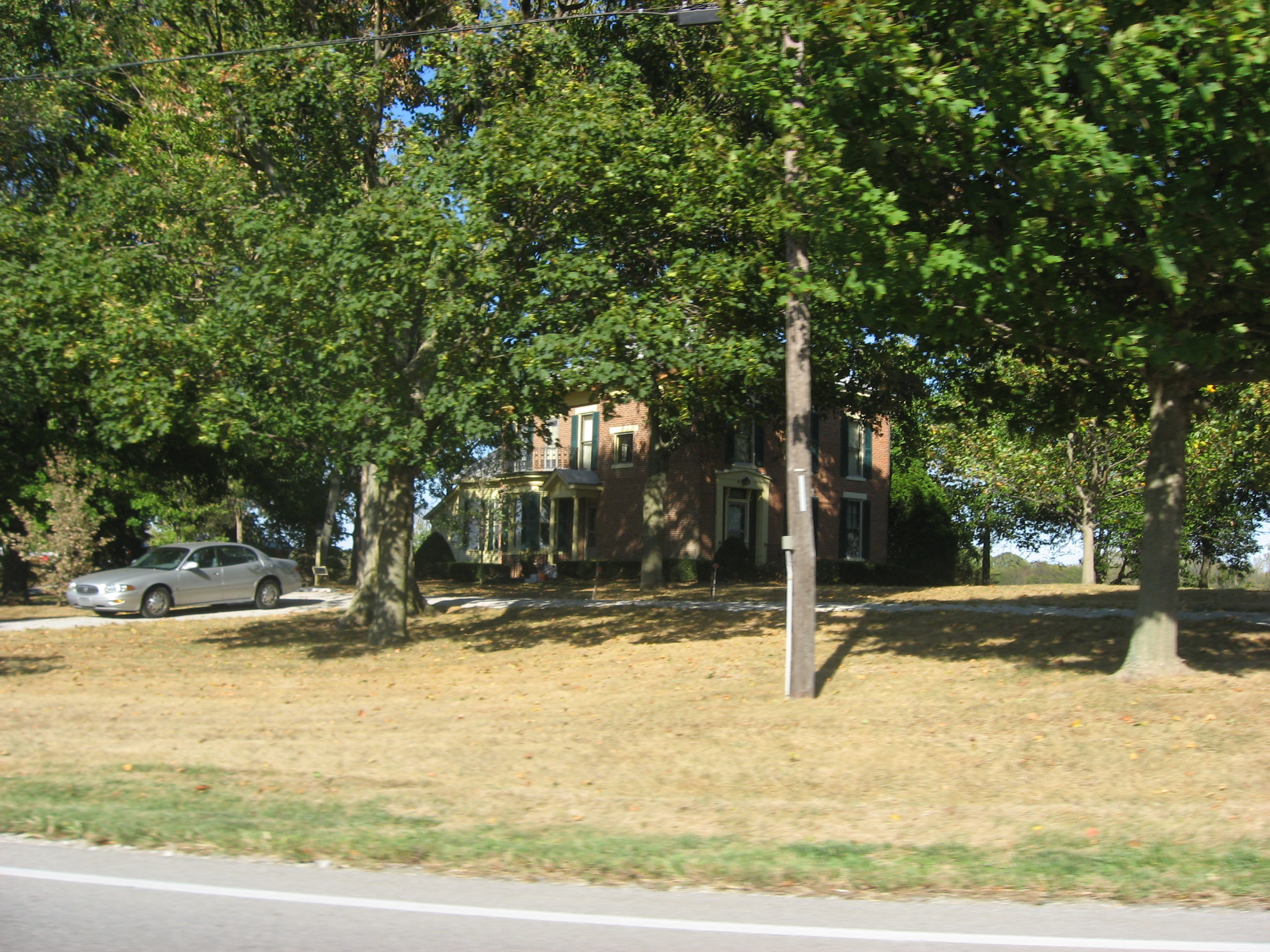
- Van Nuys Farmhouse, September 2010

- Location within Indiana Location within the United States
- Location: IN 144, northwest of Hopewell in Franklin Township, Johnson County, Indiana
- Coordinates: 39°29′58″N 86°7′9″W
- Area: 6.4 acres (2.6 ha)
- Built: c. 1840, 1866
- Architectural style: Greek Revival
- NRHP reference No.: 87000100
- Added to NRHP: February 12, 1987

Van Nuys Farm, also known as the Van Nuys Homestead, is a historic home and farm located in Franklin Township, Johnson County, Indiana, United States. The house was built in 1866, and is a two-story, Greek Revival style brick dwelling with a hipped roof. It features a pedimented entrance with transom and a full-width one-story front verandah added about 1900. Also on the property are the contributing corn crib and workshop (c. 1840), traverse frame barn, buggy shed (c. 1840), main barn (c. 1840), chicken house (c. 1885), garage (c. 1900), and four double hog houses (c. 1920).

It was listed on the National Register of Historic Places in 1987.
