= Furnas Mill Bridge =

- U.S. National Register of Historic Places
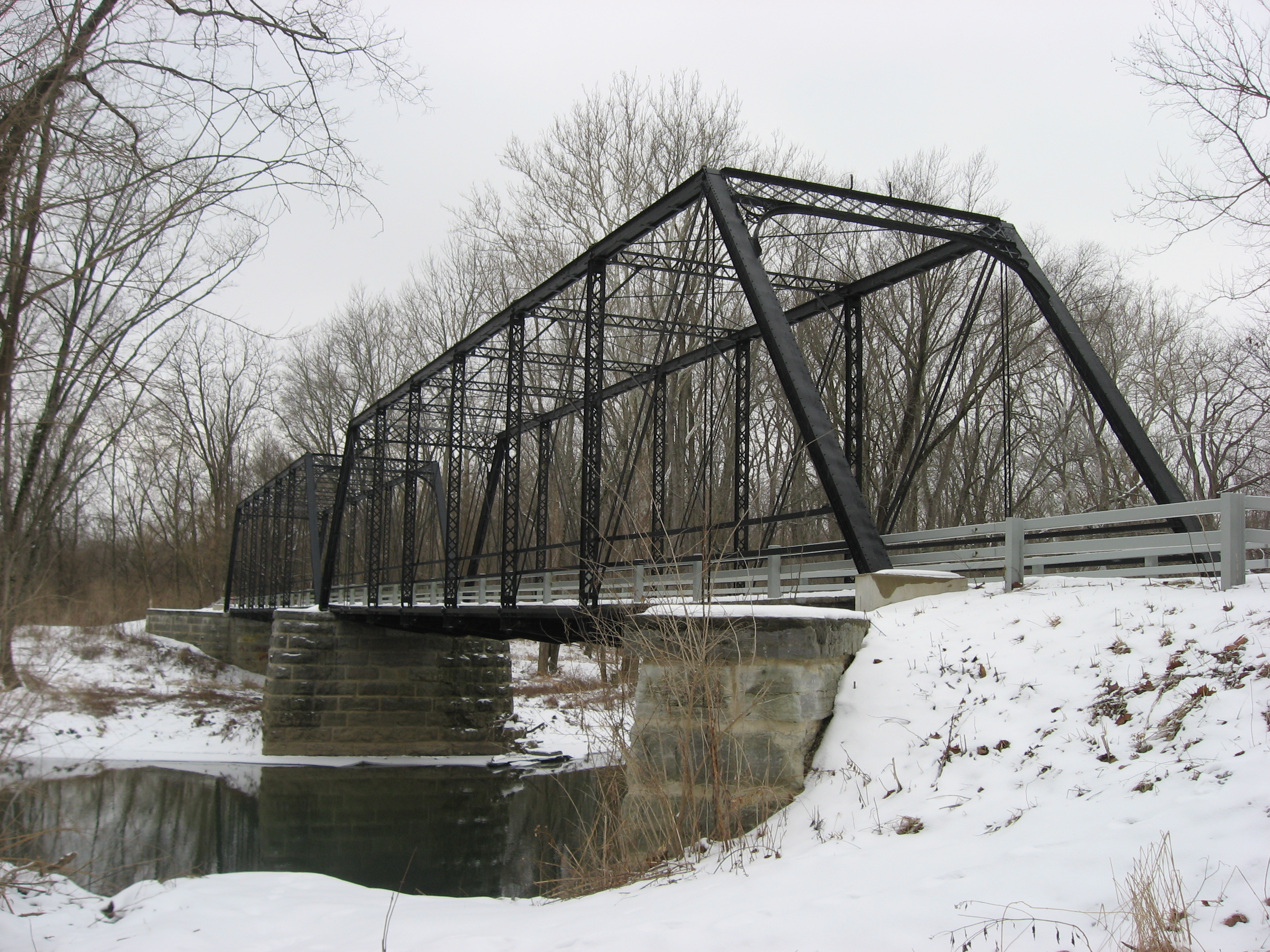
- Furnas Mill Bridge, January 2011

- Location within Indiana Location within the United States
- Location: Pisgah Rd. over Sugar Creek-Atterbury Fish and Wildlife Area, northwest of Edinburgh in Blue River Township, Johnson County, Indiana
- Coordinates: 39°22′56″N 85°59′53″W
- Area: less than one acre
- Built: 1891
- Built by: King Iron Bridge Co.
- Architectural style: Pratt through truss
- NRHP reference No.: 01000985
- Added to NRHP: September 16, 2001

Furnas Mill Bridge, also known as County Bridge No. 7080, is a historic Pratt through truss located in Blue River Township, Johnson County, Indiana. It was built in 1891 by the King Iron Bridge Co. The bridge consists of two 120 foot long spans, with a 16 foot wide roadway. The bridge rests on limestone block abutments and a central pier.

It was listed on the National Register of Historic Places in 2001.
