= August Zeppenfeld House =

Historic house in Indiana, United States

- U.S. National Register of Historic Places
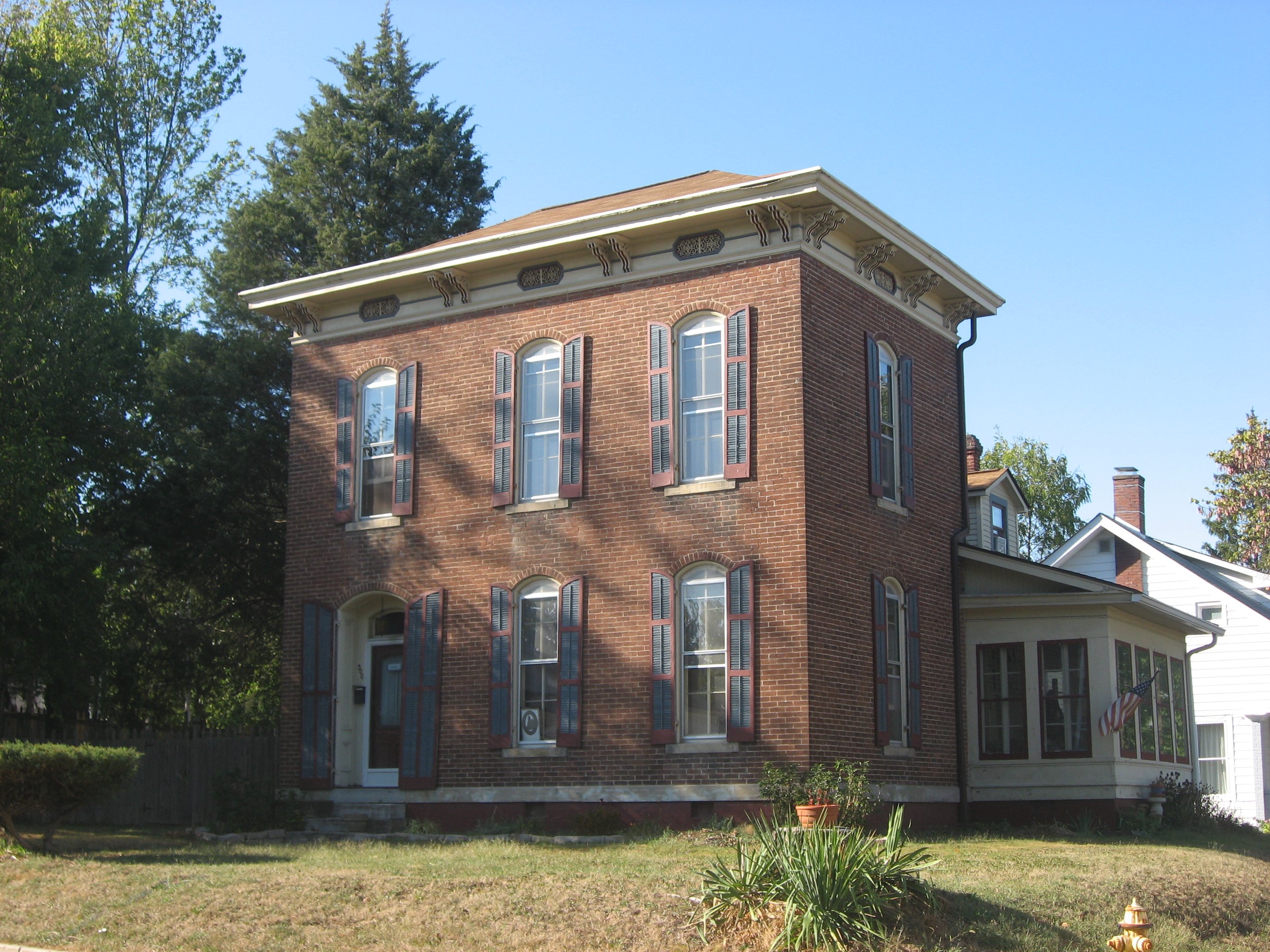
- August Zeppenfeld House, September 2010

- Location within Indiana Location within the United States
- Location: 300 W. Jefferson St., Franklin, Indiana
- Coordinates: 39°28′50″N 86°3′33″W
- Area: less than one acre
- Built: 1872
- Architectural style: Italianate
- NRHP reference No.: 87002188
- Added to NRHP: December 30, 1987

August Zeppenfeld House, also known as the Zeppenfeld-Cain House, is a historic home located in Franklin, Indiana. It was built in 1872, and is a two-story, rectangular, three bay, Italianate style brick dwelling with a one-story frame wing. One-story frame additions were made to the house about 1910, 1935, and the 1960s. It features a low hipped roof and arches openings.

It was listed on the National Register of Historic Places in 1987.
