= Franklin College (Indiana) =

Private college in Franklin, Indiana, US

Coordinates: 39°28′44″N 86°02′47″W

- Former name: Indiana Baptist Manual-Labor Institute (1834–1844)
- Motto: Relentlessly Pursue
- Type: Private liberal arts college
- Established: 1834; 192 years ago
- Religious affiliation: American Baptist Churches USA
- Endowment: $105.35 million (2025)
- President: Kerry N. Prather
- Faculty: 81 full-time; 35 part-time
- Students: 966 (fall 2023)
- Location: Franklin, Indiana, U.S.
- Campus: 207 acres (84 ha)
- Colors: Navy blue and Old gold
- Nickname: Grizzlies
- Sporting affiliations: NCAA Division III
- Website: franklincollege.edu

Franklin College is a private liberal arts college in Franklin, Indiana. It was founded in 1834 and has a wooded campus spanning 207 acres (84 ha) including athletic fields and a 31-acre (13 ha) biology woodland. The college offers its approximately 1,000 students Bachelor of Arts degrees in 49 majors from 25 academic disciplines, 43 minors, 11 pre-professional programs, and 5 cooperative programs. The college also offers a Master of Science in Athletic Training and a Master of Science in Physician Assistant Studies. In 1842, the college began admitting women, becoming the first coeducational institution in Indiana and the seventh in the nation. Franklin College has historically maintained an affiliation with the American Baptist Churches USA.

== History ==
Franklin College was originally founded in 1834 as the Indiana Baptist Manual-Labor Institute, a manual labor college. Ten years later, the Indiana General Assembly changed the school's name to Franklin College.

== Campus ==
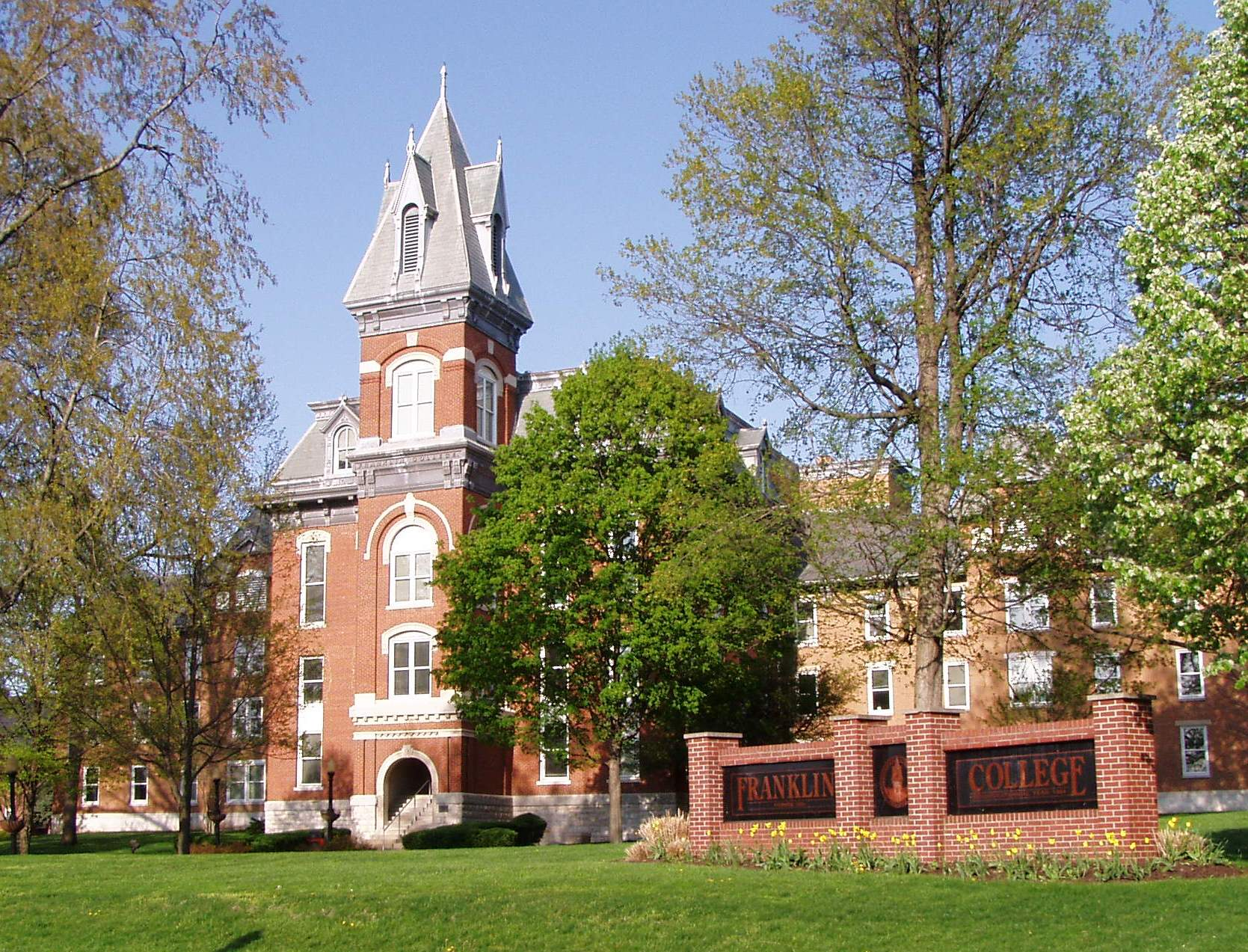
Old Main

Located in Franklin, the college's 207-acre (0.84 km^{2}) campus includes an athletic park and a 31-acre (130,000 m^{2}) woodland for biology study. Nearly all the buildings on campus are placed around an ellipse known as Dame Mall, named after John Dame, the first-ever graduate of Franklin College.

In 1962, a large statue of Benjamin Franklin was gifted to the college from the Indianapolis Typographical Union. It is on campus today at the corner of Branigin Boulevard and Monroe Street.

The bronze "Ben Bench" outside the Napolitan Student Center was donated to the college in 2005 by Bohdan Mysko, a retired businessman and art collector. He purchased the sculpture from artist George Lundeen in 1990. The sculpture was produced sixteenth in a series of the 20 identical ones that Lundeen created.

The Von Boll Welcome Center was opened in 2003 and houses the offices of admissions and financial aid.

The Napolitan Student Center, opened in 2004, is a hub of student activity on campus and home to the dining hall, the college bookstore, a large atrium, the Center for Diversity and Inclusion, the Student Activity Center, Grizzly Cafe, campus security office, conference rooms, counseling, and health center, and the Branigin Room, which is used for lectures, award ceremonies, and community functions.

Branigin Boulevard, opened in 2004, serves as the main entrance to campus. The project was a collaboration between the college and the city of Franklin.

The Napolitan Alumni House was dedicated in 2005. The historic three-story brick house once served as the home to college presidents. It currently serves as a gathering place during special events as well as accommodations for visiting dignitaries.

Another hub of student activity is the Spurlock Center, which contains classroom space, a fitness center, gymnasium, indoor track, the Franklin College Athletic Hall of Fame, and athletic offices. This is also where pep rallies, school assemblies, commencement, and numerous presentations involving guest speakers are held.

Richardson Chapel hosts services and special events for students, faculty, staff, and the community.

The Wellhouse that stands in Dame Mall was constructed in 1917 as a monument to the Class of 2016 and was built by Blanche Crawford, class of 1916.

The Dietz Center for Professional Development was dedicated in 1994. It houses the offices of Leadership Johnson County at Franklin College and connects to the Dietz Residence Hall.

The Andrews-Dietz House on campus was dedicated in 2005 and houses the Marketing and Communications Offices.

=== Educational buildings ===
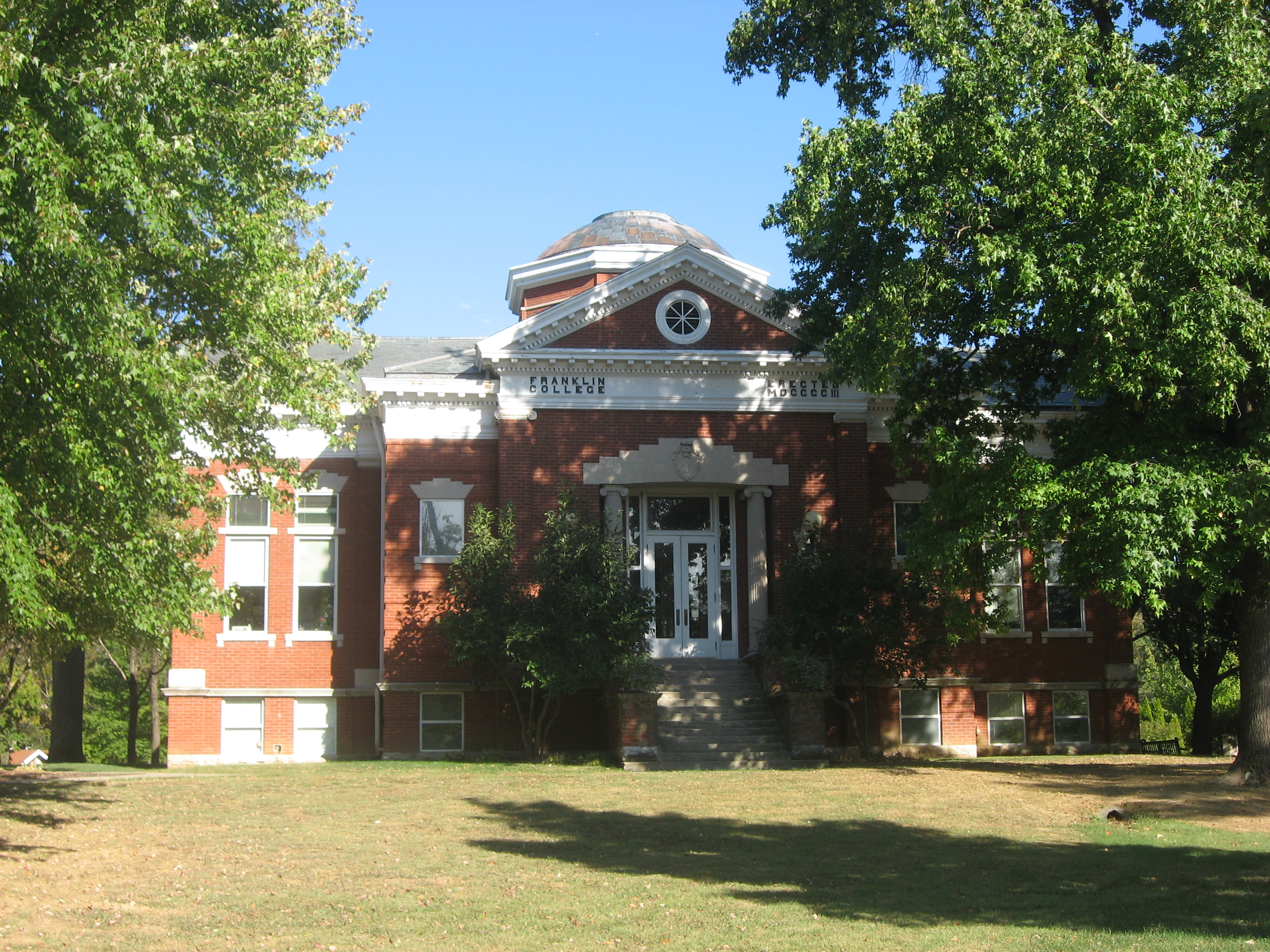
Shirk Hall

- Old Main, the iconic clock tower located at the campus entrance, is used for classes in varying subjects. It also houses offices for areas of campus such as Information Technology Services, Development and Alumni Engagement, the Business Office, the President's Office, and a variety of faculty and staff offices. It also houses Custer Theatre where choir concerts and other functions take place. This building was almost completely destroyed by a fire on April 21, 1985. On the stairwell landing is a wooden stand with a bronze bust of Benjamin Franklin that is known for having paint rubbed off its nose due to students touching it. (College legend says doing so before an exam will bring good luck.)
- The Franklin College Science Center is the newest facility on campus and is where most undergraduate science classes are held.
- The Franklin College Graduate Health Science Center opened in 2018 and is where the college's master's programs are housed.
- Johnson Center for Fine Arts, called JCFA for short, was opened in 2001 and is where fine arts classes are held. School plays also are performed here in Theatre Margot.
- Shirk Hall, constructed in 1903, houses the Pulliam School of Journalism, is home to the Indiana High School Press Association and to radio station 89.5 WFCI and The Franklin, the college's student-run newspaper.
- B.F. Hamilton Library has a 24-hour computer lab, auditorium, Academic Resource Center, Silent Study area (2nd floor), and Disability Services.

Old Main and Shirk Hall were listed on the National Register of Historic Places in 1975. The central campus area was listed on the National Register in 2024.

=== Residence Halls ===
- Elsey Hall is a predominately freshmen dormitory that has exclusively double rooms (with the exception of RA rooms, but others can use one as a single for a fee). Originally, it was the only all-female dormitory on campus. Elsey Hall is connected to the four Panhellenic suites belonging to the three (formerly four) sororities.
- Hoover-Cline, two buildings connected by a glass tunnel and located in the center of campus, provides singles, doubles, and quads (exclusive to Hoover).
- Johnson-Dietz, for upperclassmen only, is two separate buildings and popular due to the residential suites with bay windows that are occupied by 3–4 people. Many on campus refer to it as "The Sections" because several suites are grouped in a particular section marked by a letter.
- Dietz Center, for upperclassmen only, offers single rooms and suites. Popular for its environment, the attached Dietz Center for Professional Development building is also used for community purposes and houses offices.

=== Themed and Greek Housing ===
All five active fraternities currently have houses and provide residence to their members. The BOLD (Building Our Leaders Through Diversity) House, which aims to promote understanding and respect for multiculturalism and diversity and to provide intellectual, social and cultural programs focused on multicultural enrichment. The BOLD community was displaced from its house in Spring 2019, and the Living-Learning Community now resides in Section A of the Johnson-Dietz residence hall.

=== Greek Life ===
Franklin College is home to five fraternities and three sororities that are active. It's estimated that 30 percent of Franklin College students are involved in Greek Life. All five fraternities provide housing, whereas the sororities use reserved Panhellenic suites owned by the college for meetings, ceremonies, and other activities. The Greek community plays an active role on campus and holds multiple philanthropic events throughout the year.

The current active fraternities include Phi Delta Theta (Indiana Delta; 1860–present, suspended from 2016 to 2019), Sigma Alpha Epsilon (Indiana Alpha; 1892–present), Kappa Delta Rho (Epsilon; 1919–present, inactive from 1972 to 1980), Lambda Chi Alpha (Kappa Gamma; 1924–present) and Tau Kappa Epsilon (Rho Upsilon; 1988–present).

The currently active sororities include Zeta Tau Alpha (Beta Theta; 1927–present), Delta Delta Delta (Delta Zeta; 1912–present) and Pi Beta Phi (Indiana Alpha; 1888–present).

At one point, Franklin College also had three additional sororities that are no longer active - Kappa Kappa Gamma (Nu; 1879–1884), Delta Gamma (Phi Alpha; 1995–2008) and Delta Zeta (Psi; 1920–1990). In addition, benches on campus have been dedicated to both chapters and there are display cases in the Hamilton Library in their honor that show photos, shirts, and other insignia belonging to their members.

== Athletics ==
Franklin College athletics monogram

Franklin College is a charter and current member of the Heartland Collegiate Athletic Conference in NCAA Division III. Originally, Franklin's athletics teams (nicknamed Grizzlies) had no nickname. Due to the college's affiliation with the Baptist church, names such as “The Fighting Baptists” were used. One of the first documented uses of the name “Grizzlies” can be found in 1929. This name originates from the nickname of Ernest “Griz” Wagner. In the 1920s, Wagner coached the Franklin College basketball team known as the Franklin Wonder Five (1918–1926), after having previously coached the core of the team in high school. This combination won three consecutive Indiana High School Championships (1920–1922) and in the 1922–1923 season, the team won 50 consecutive games, defeating Purdue University, University of Notre Dame, University of Illinois, and University of Wisconsin.

In NCAA Division III football, Franklin College has a rivalry with Hanover College dating from 1898. Since 1938, the annual winner of the game wins the Victory Bell, hence the name of the game, the “Victory Bell Game.” As of November 2023, Hanover leads the series 46–43–3.

The football team, the women's lacrosse team, and both the men's and women's soccer teams play at Faught Stadium. This field is named for Stewart “Red” Faught. Faught coached football at Franklin College for 32 years (1956–1988) and acquired a record of 160 wins. One of his players, Terry Hoeppner, went on to become the head football coach for Miami University and Indiana University.

Men's athletic teams include baseball, basketball, cross county, football, golf, soccer, swimming and diving, tennis, and track and field. Women's athletic teams include basketball, cross country, golf, lacrosse, soccer, softball, tennis, volleyball, swimming and diving, and track and field.

== Notable people ==
=== Notable alumni ===
- George Banta, printer whose company is credited for designing multiple Greek crests, influential figure in development of Phi Delta Theta and Delta Gamma (the sorority's only male initiate)
- Joseph Beam, African-American gay rights activist
- Joe Benigno, sports radio personality
- Roger D. Branigin, Governor of Indiana
- Walter Coffey, seventh president of University of Minnesota
- Steven A. Cohen, academic, author, environmentalist, professor of Public Management and Environmental Policy at Columbia University
- Brad Crawford, College Football Hall of Fame inductee
- Elmer Davis, The New York Times editorial writer, CBS radio newscaster, director of the United States Office of War Information, and Peabody Award recipient
- William G. Everson, major general in the United States Army and Chief of the National Guard Bureau
- Paul Franklin, running back for Chicago Bears from 1931 to 1933
- Christopher T. Gonzalez, LGBT activist
- Francis M. Griffith, Indiana State Senator (1886–1894) and U.S. Representative (1897–1905)
- Terry Hoeppner, head football coach at Indiana University and Miami University
- Ralph Isselhardt, American football player
- Eddy Jerman, inventor and an early expert in the techniques of medical radiography
- W. A. Jarrel, evangelist and author
- Jeff Lewis, professional golfer
- Marjorie Main, actress
- Gareth Matthews, renowned philosopher and college philosophy professor at University of Virginia, University of Minnesota, and most notably, University of Massachusetts Amherst
- Paul Monroe, notable collegiate history professor and author
- Thomas Jefferson Morgan, Educator and Civil War General, later Commissioner of Indian Affairs under President Benjamin Harrison
- Jesse Overstreet, U.S. Representative
- Edna Parker, for a year, the world's oldest person (since Aug 13, 2007) (1893–2008)
- Fuzzy Vandivier, Hall of Fame basketball player.
- Arch West, marketing executive who developed Doritos.
- Gene White, original member of the basketball team that inspired the film Hoosiers
- Guilford M. Wiley, Wisconsin State Assemblyman
- Robert Wise, Academy Award-winning director and producer
- Merry Ann Thompson Wright, CEO of the American Lung Association of Central New York and 42nd President General of the Daughters of the American Revolution

=== Notable faculty ===
- Albert Berg, football coach, deaf football player, and 40-year teacher at Indiana School for the Deaf
- John S. Hougham, professor, President of the Board, abolitionist, developer of the solar compass
- Thomas Locker, art professor, author, illustrator, and artist who later taught at Shimer College
- Homer Rainey, college president (1927–1931) who later served as president of Bucknell University (1931–1935), University of Texas at Austin (1939–1944), and Stephens College (1947–1956)
- Gene White, FC alumnus (see above), professor of mathematics, basketball coach, and part of the basketball team that inspired the film, Hoosiers
