= Martin Place Historic District =

Historic district in Indiana, United States

- U.S. National Register of Historic Places
- U.S. Historic district
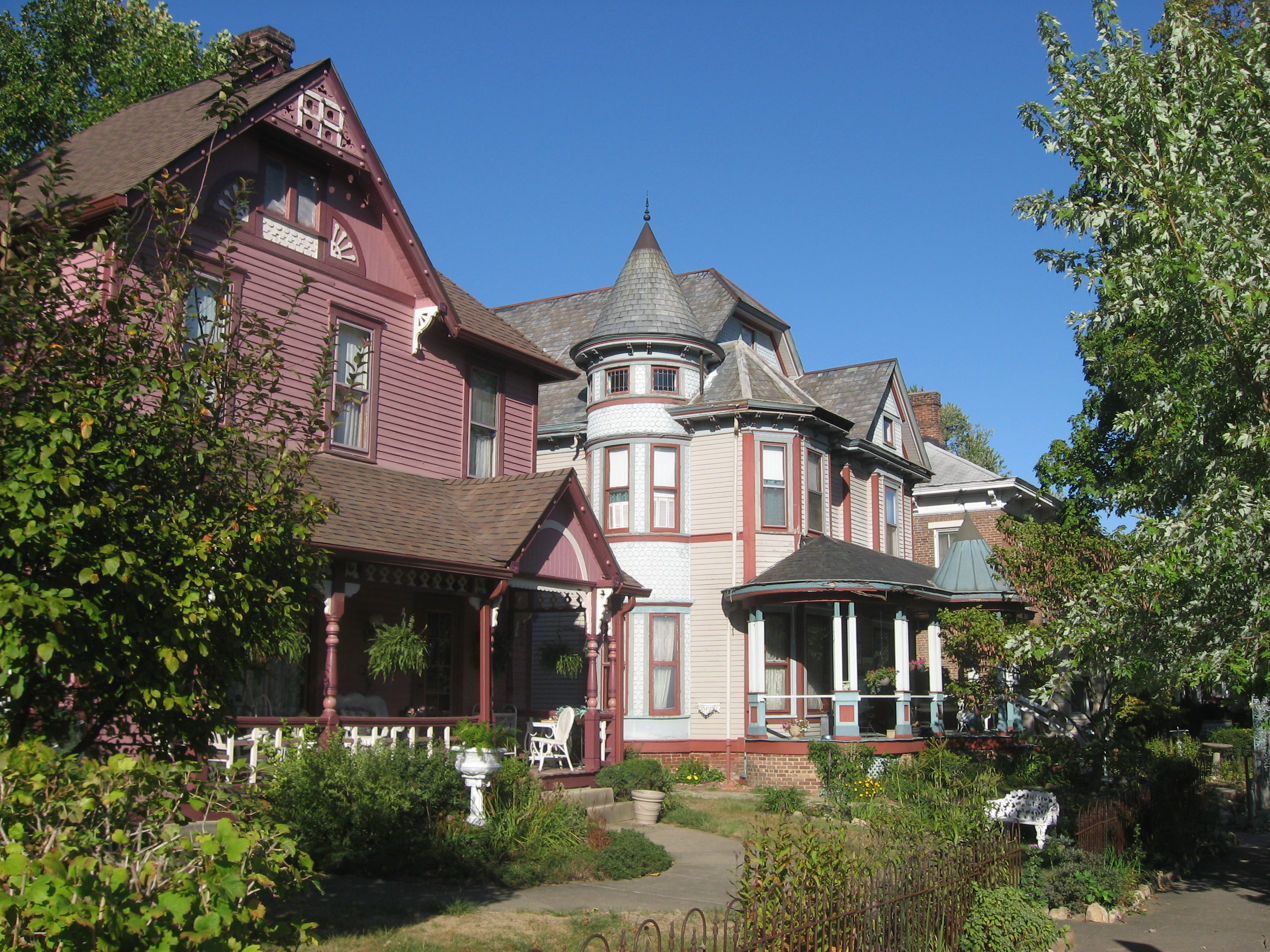
- Martin Place in Franklin, September 2010

- Location within Indiana Location within the United States
- Location: N and S sides of Martin Pl. between Graham Ave. and Water St., 500, 498, and 450 N. Main Sts., Franklin, Indiana
- Coordinates: 39°29′07″N 86°3′16″W
- Area: 1 acre (0.40 ha)
- Built: 1850
- Architectural style: Bungalow/craftsman, Late Victorian
- NRHP reference No.: 87000951
- Added to NRHP: June 12, 1987

Martin Place Historic District is a national historic district located at Franklin, Indiana. The district encompasses 27 contributing buildings, one contributing structure, and one contributing object in an exclusively residential section of Franklin. It developed between about 1850 and 1935, and includes notable examples of Italianate, Queen Anne, American Foursquare, and Bungalow / American Craftsman style architecture.

It was listed on the National Register of Historic Places in 1987.
