= Franklin Senior High School (Indiana) =

- U.S. National Register of Historic Places
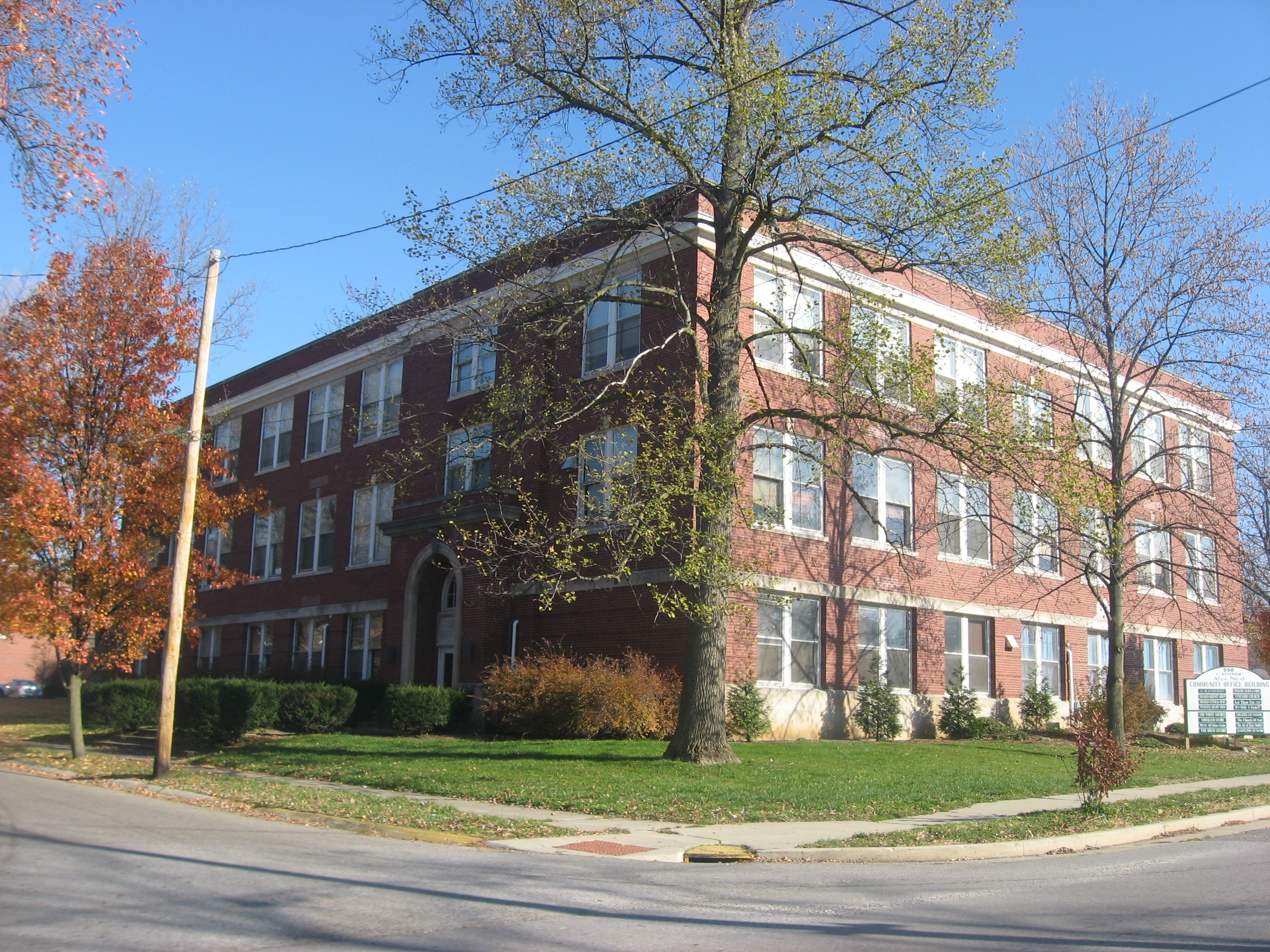
- Franklin Senior High School, November 2012

- Location within Indiana Location within the United States
- Location: 550 E. Jefferson St., Franklin, Indiana
- Coordinates: 39°28′52″N 86°02′54″W
- Area: Less than 1 acre (0.40 ha)
- Architect: McGuire & Shook
- Architectural style: Italian Renaissance
- MPS: Indiana's Public Common and High Schools MPS
- NRHP reference No.: 12001058
- Added to NRHP: December 17, 2012

Franklin Senior High School, also known as the Alva Neal Community Building, is a historic high school located at Franklin, Indiana. It was built in 1938, and is a three-story, L-shaped, red brick building with some Italian Renaissance style embellishments. Its construction was partially funded by a grant from the Public Works Administration. It was originally connected to an older school building by a covered walkway. The building ceased use as a high school in 1960.

It was listed on the National Register of Historic Places in 2012.
