= Franklin College Library (Shirk Hall) =

- Franklin College Pulliam School of Journalism (Shirk Hall)
- U.S. National Register of Historic Places
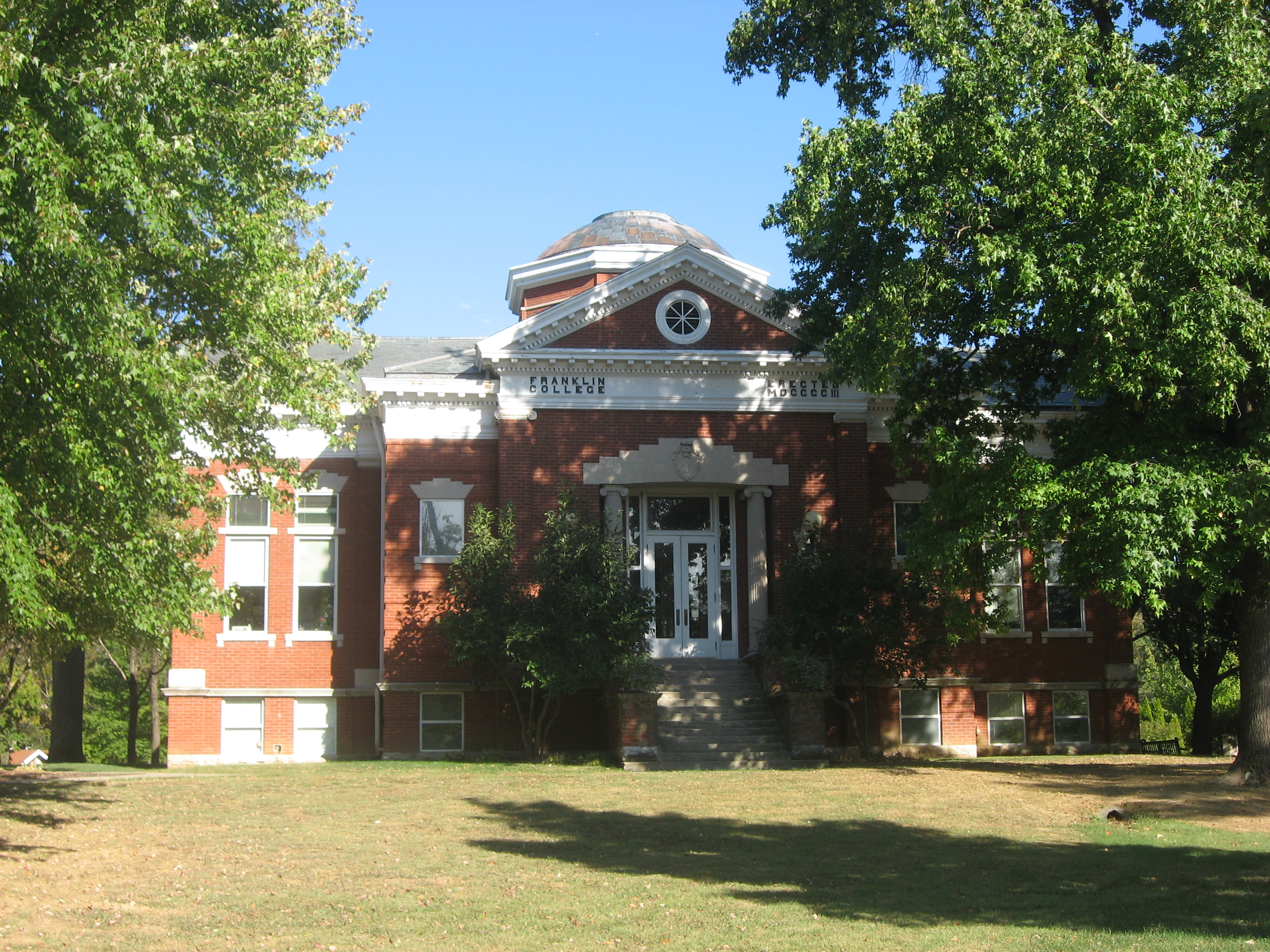
- Shirk Hall, Franklin College, September 2010

- Location within Indiana Location within the United States
- Location: 600 E. Monroe St., Franklin, Indiana
- Coordinates: 39°28′43″N 86°2′51″W
- Area: less than one acre
- Built: 1903
- Architectural style: Classical Revival
- NRHP reference No.: 75000021
- Added to NRHP: October 29, 1975

Shirk Hall is a historic building located on the campus of Franklin College in Franklin, Indiana. It was built in 1903 and is a one-story, Classical Revival style brick building on a raised basement. It is topped by a cross-gabled roof and copper dome on an octagonal base. The front entrance features engaged Ionic order columns. The building housed the school library until 1964. The building is now home to the college's media school, The Pulliam School of Journalism.

It was listed on the National Register of Historic Places in 1975.
