= W. A. Jarrel =

American evangelist and author (1849–1927)

Rev. Willis Anselm Jarrel D.D. (1849–1927) was an American author, debater, Baptist minister and evangelist. He wrote a number of books and papers on the subject of Christian doctrine and Baptist Church history.

== Early life and education ==
Jarrel was born in Indiana 1849. He was educated in Franklin College of his native state. He graduated with the titles of D.D. and the LL.D.

== Career ==
Jarrel was pastor of the Baptist Church in Charleston, Illinois, and later in Stonington, Illinois. He became pastor Oak Grove Baptist Church, and later of the Pinckneyville Baptist Church in 1879. He moved to Texas and worked at the Coggins Avenue Missionary Baptist Church in Texas.

Jarrel's written works include theological reviews by universities and authors including: Yale, Chicago University, Berlin University (Germany), Regents Park College (London), Charles Spurgeon, and Jewish scholar Rabbi Wise.

His book Baptist Church Perpetuity explained his theory that various Christian movements of the past led inevitably to the formation of the Baptist Church. Another book, Baptizo-Dip Only, expressed his disagreement with Dr. Whitsett's assertions about the baptismal rites of English Baptists.

Jarell participated in the Southern Baptist Convention of 1914.

== Selected bibliography ==
- Old Testament Ethics Vindicated : Being An Exposition Of Old Testament Morals ... And A Vindication Of Old Testament Morals, published in 1882.
- Baptizo-Dip Only: The World's Pedobaptist Greek Scholarship
- Baptist Church Perpetuity, 1904.
