= Franklin Township, Johnson County, Indiana =

Franklin Township
- Township
- Coordinates: 39°29′04″N 86°05′29″W
- Country: United States
- State: Indiana
- County: Johnson

Government
  - Type: Indiana township
  - Township Trustee: Lydia J. Wales

Area
  - Total: 35.53 sq mi (92.0 km^{2})
  - Land: 35.51 sq mi (92.0 km^{2})
  - Water: 0.02 sq mi (0.052 km^{2})
- Elevation: 732 ft (223 m)

Population (2020)
  - Total: 21,230
  - Density: 582.5/sq mi (224.9/km^{2})
- FIPS code: 18-25468
- GNIS feature ID: 453306

Franklin Township was one of nine townships in Johnson County, Indiana. As of the 2010 census, its population was 20,685 and it contained 8,503 housing units. Lydia J. Wales was elected as Franklin Township Trustee and began serving her first term on January 1, 2015 and was reelected to a second term beginning on January 1, 2019.

As of January 1, 2022, Franklin, Union, and Needham townships were merged into a single entity known as Franklin-Union-Needham Township ("FUN").

== History ==
Hopewell Presbyterian Church and Van Nuys Farm are listed on the National Register of Historic Places. The Franklin Township Trustee's office was relocated to 20 Circle Drive in Franklin in 2019. The trustee's office is primarily tasked with poor relief and fire protection for unincorporated areas within the township.

== Geography ==
According to the 2010 census, the township has a total area of 35.53 square miles (92.0 km^{2}), of which 35.51 square miles (92.0 km^{2}) (or 99.94%) is land and 0.02 square miles (0.052 km^{2}) (or 0.06%) is water.
