= Franklin, Indiana =

Franklin
- City
- City of Franklin
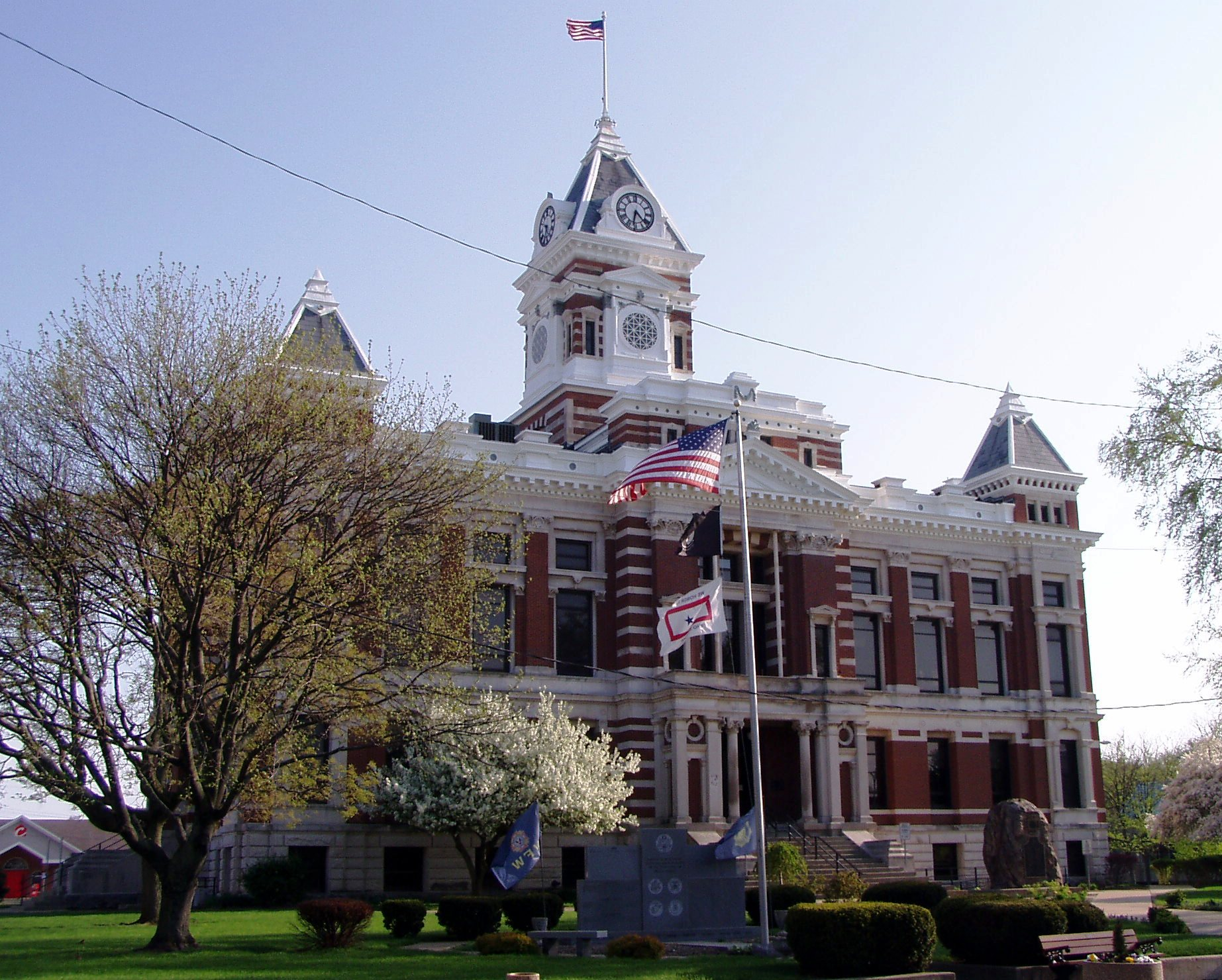
- Johnson County Courthouse Square in Franklin

- Flag Seal
- Motto(s): "Live, Work and Play for a Lifetime"
- Location of Franklin in Johnson County, Indiana
- Coordinates: 39°29′55″N 86°03′24″W
- Country: United States
- State: Indiana
- County: Johnson
- Townships: Franklin, Needham, and Pleasant
- Founded: 1823
- Incorporated (city): 1861

Government
  - Mayor: Steve Barnett (R)

Area
  - Total: 14.76 sq mi (38.23 km^{2})
  - Land: 14.76 sq mi (38.23 km^{2})
  - Water: 0 sq mi (0.00 km^{2})
- Elevation: 742 ft (226 m)

Population (2020)
  - Total: 25,313
  - Density: 1,714.7/sq mi (662.04/km^{2})
- Time zone: UTC-5 (EST)
  - Summer (DST): UTC-4 (EDT)
- ZIP code: 46131
- Area code: 317
- FIPS code: 18-25450
- GNIS feature ID: 2394808
- Website: www.franklin.in.gov

Franklin is a city in Johnson County, Indiana, United States. As of the 2020 census, Franklin had a population of 25,313. Located about 20 miles (32 km) south of Indianapolis, the city is the county seat of Johnson County. The site of Franklin College, the city attracts numerous regional sports fans for the college teams, as well as audiences for its art events.

== History ==
Franklin was platted in 1823. It was named after Benjamin Franklin. The Franklin post office was established in 1824. Franklin was incorporated as a city in 1861.

Bethel African Methodist Episcopal Church, Franklin College Library (Shirk Hall), Franklin College-Old Main, Franklin Commercial Historic District, Franklin Senior High School, Greenlawn Cemetery, Herriott House, Johnson County Courthouse Square, Martin Place Historic District, Masonic Temple, and August Zeppenfeld House are listed on the National Register of Historic Places.

=== Franklin Wonder Five ===
The small town became nationally famous during the 1920s due to the outstanding athletic achievements of the local high school basketball team, who became known as the Franklin Wonder Five. A small group who had played together as boys, led by Fuzzy Vandivier and coached by Ernest "Griz" Wagner, they became the first high school team to win the state championship for three consecutive years (1920–22). The youths followed Wagner to the local Franklin College, where he became coach and they earned the title of national college champions in 1923. They turned down an offer to play against the top professional team, the New York Celtics.

=== Life magazine feature ===
The December 2, 1940 issue of Life magazine included a photo essay by Bernard Hoffman entitled, "A Small Town's Saturday Night," depicting farmers Glen and Norris Dunn and family on a typical Saturday night in Franklin: Dad getting a hair cut, and the kids seeing a movie at the Artcraft, people at the drugstore, as well as photos of other social spots, such as Nick's Candy Kitchen and the town's "lovers' lane." The nighttime photo showing double-parked cars and thick crowds on Jefferson Street is perhaps the best known of the set. According to the late-20th century critic James Guimond in his book on American photography,

Since "Life" wanted a perfect Saturday night, and one they considered typical, the photographer did not select a town still blighted by the Depression... What "Life's"' readers wanted, it seemed, was a stereotyped village that confirmed their nostalgic beliefs about small towns in which no one is bored, poor, or lonely; and the magazine's photographers and editors - like Norman Rockwell in his "Saturday Evening Post" covers - gave them exactly that kind of town.

== Geography ==
Franklin is located 20 miles (32 km) south of Indianapolis and 90 miles (140 km) north of Louisville, Kentucky, on I-65 and U.S. 31.

According to the 2010 census, Franklin has a total area of 13.01 square miles (33.70 km^{2}), all land.

There are three small waterways in Franklin: Canary Creek and Hurricane Creek flow into Young's Creek. These creeks flood frequently. Their small floodplain has been adapted as the basis of Franklin's green walkways and parks, which extend the entire length of the town. Hurricane Creek empties into Young's Creek in Province Park, downtown, which flows into the Big Blue River farther South. A buried stream, Roaring Run, flows beneath Franklin. In the June 2008 Midwest floods, all of these streams overflowed, damaging or destroying more than 100 houses throughout Franklin, including some entire neighborhoods. Since 2008, The city of Franklin has bought many of the flood-damaged homes, and cleared them to make more green space, and expand the parks system. Province Park is home to a small family cemetery of the George King family, one of the original founding families of Franklin.

=== Climate ===
The climate in this area is characterized by hot, humid summers and generally mild to cool winters. According to the Köppen Climate Classification system, Franklin has a humid subtropical climate, abbreviated "Cfa" on climate maps.

Climate data for Franklin, IN (1991-2020 precipitation normals, coordinates:39.4889°N 86.0731°W)
Month	Jan	Feb	Mar	Apr	May	Jun	Jul	Aug	Sep	Oct	Nov	Dec	Year
Average precipitation inches	3.22	2.42	3.60	4.80	4.99	5.08	4.37	3.39	3.27	3.11	3.56	3.16	44.97
Average precipitation mm	82	61	91	122	127	129	111	86	83	79	90	80	1,141
Source: NOAA

== Demographics ==
Historical population
Census	Pop.	Note	%±
1850	882		—
1860	2,367		168.4%
1870	2,707		14.4%
1880	3,110		14.9%
1890	3,781		21.6%
1900	4,005		5.9%
1910	4,502		12.4%
1920	4,909		9.0%
1930	5,682		15.7%
1940	6,264		10.2%
1950	7,316		16.8%
1960	9,453		29.2%
1970	11,477		21.4%
1980	11,563		0.7%
1990	12,907		11.6%
2000	19,463		50.8%
2010	23,712		21.8%
2020	25,313		6.8%
Source: US Census Bureau

=== 2020 census ===
As of the 2020 census, Franklin had a population of 25,313. The median age was 36.5 years. 24.4% of residents were under the age of 18 and 17.0% of residents were 65 years of age or older. For every 100 females there were 91.8 males, and for every 100 females age 18 and over there were 87.1 males age 18 and over.

99.7% of residents lived in urban areas, while 0.3% lived in rural areas.

There were 9,422 households in Franklin, of which 34.5% had children under the age of 18 living in them. Of all households, 47.8% were married-couple households, 16.3% were households with a male householder and no spouse or partner present, and 27.7% were households with a female householder and no spouse or partner present. About 26.6% of all households were made up of individuals and 11.8% had someone living alone who was 65 years of age or older.

There were 10,059 housing units, of which 6.3% were vacant. The homeowner vacancy rate was 1.0% and the rental vacancy rate was 7.5%.

Racial composition as of the 2020 census
Race	Number	Percent
White	22,681	89.6%
Black or African American	437	1.7%
American Indian and Alaska Native	104	0.4%
Asian	282	1.1%
Native Hawaiian and Other Pacific Islander	11	0.0%
Some other race	453	1.8%
Two or more races	1,345	5.3%
Hispanic or Latino (of any race)	1,059	4.2%

=== 2010 census ===
As of the census of 2010, there were 23,712 people, 8,885 households, and 5,986 families living in the city. The population density was 1,822.6 inhabitants per square mile (703.7/km^{2}). There were 9,895 housing units at an average density of 760.6 units per square mile (293.7 units/km^{2}). The racial makeup of the city was 94.9% White, 1.4% African American, 0.3% Native American, 0.8% Asian, 1.0% from other races, and 1.6% from two or more races. Hispanic or Latino of any race were 2.5% of the population.

There were 8,885 households, of which 36.9% had children under the age of 18 living with them, 48.6% were married couples living together, 13.4% had a female householder with no husband present, 5.4% had a male householder with no wife present, and 32.6% were non-families. 27.0% of all households were made up of individuals, and 11.9% had someone living alone who was 65 years of age or older. The average household size was 2.54 and the average family size was 3.07.

The median age in the city was 34.6 years. 26.3% of residents were under the age of 18; 10.5% were between the ages of 18 and 24; 26.6% were from 25 to 44; 22% were from 45 to 64; and 14.6% were 65 years of age or older. The gender makeup of the city was 47.7% male and 52.3% female.

=== 2000 census ===
As of the census of 2000, there were 19,463 people, 6,824 households, and 4,872 families living in the city. The population increased by more than 50% during the 1990s (see table at right), with new residents attracted by jobs in the community, as well as some people commuting to Indianapolis for work. The population density was 1,728.1 inhabitants per square mile (667.2/km^{2}). There were 7,432 housing units at an average density of 659.9 units per square mile (254.8 units/km^{2}). The racial makeup of the city was 0.2% Native American, 96.7% White, 1.2% African American, 0.51% Asian, 0.05% Pacific Islander, 0.59% from other races, and at least 0.81% from two or more races. Hispanic or Latino of any race were 1.31% of the population.

There were 6,824 households, out of which 37.6% had children under the age of 18 living with them, 54.7% were married couples living together, 12.5% had a female householder with no husband present, and 28.6% were non-families. 23.6% of all households were made up of individuals, and 8.4% had someone living alone who was 65 years of age or older. The average household size was 2.58 and the average family size was 3.04.

In the city, the population was spread out, with 26.0% under the age of 18, 11.5% from 18 to 24, 29.9% from 25 to 44, 16.8% from 45 to 64, and 15.8% who were 65 years of age or older. The median age was 33 years. For every 100 females, there were 88.3 males. For every 100 females age 18 and over, there were 83.4 males.

The median income for a household in the city was $45,414, and the median income for a family was $52,304. Males had a median income of $37,509 versus $25,601 for females. The per capita income for the city was $18,937. About 4.5% of families and 7.6% of the population were below the poverty line, including 7.7% of those under age 18 and 10.3% of those age 65 or over.

== Attractions and economy ==
Several major international companies have operations in the city: Toyota, NSK, KYB and Mitsubishi. The city has worked to strengthen its international connections. Franklin is home of the first Ritters Frozen Custard, which has since franchised to several other markets. Franklin once had its own automobile factory, the Indiana Motor & Manufacturing Company. It produced the Continental brand from 1910 to 1913, and the Martindale & Millikan brand in 1914 and 1915. The Whitesides truck was also built in Franklin between 1910 and 1914

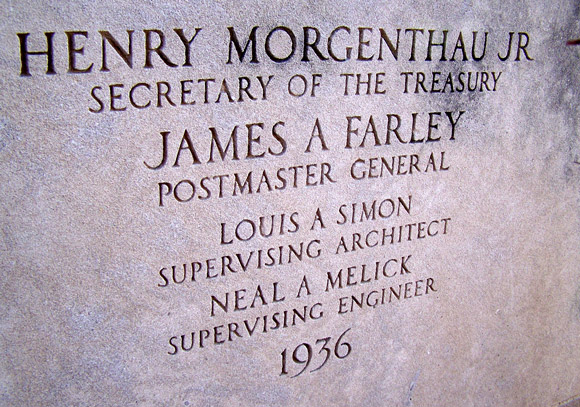
Franklin, IN Post Office Cornerstone

Downtown Franklin is noted for the number of well-maintained, older houses and early brick streets. Landmark buildings include the Johnson County Courthouse and the Artcraft Theatre. Due west of the Artcraft is the renovated former City Hall, a Colonial Revival building originally constructed in 1936 to be used as a post office. It was designed by architect Louis A. Simon under Postmaster General James Farley. It was the original site of a federally commissioned Works Progress Administration (WPA) mural painted by Franklin artist Jean Swiggett, who started his career during the difficult years of the Great Depression. The WPA work was moved to the "new" post office when it was built by the federal government. In the 1980s, a private non-profit group, Franklin Heritage Inc., was formed by citizens to preserve and restore its historic assets for new purposes. It now owns the Artcraft Theatre and is making it a community center for film, art, and special events. The current City Hall is located just east of the Johnson County Courthouse, and it also contains the Festival Country Indiana Visitor Center, which contains interactive exhibits that tell the story of the communities of Johnson County.

The Franklin Parks and Recreation Department maintains several miles of walking trails through the city, which connect various parks, community centers, the public library, and the public pool. Due to flood damage, the long park along the creeks was closed for the summer of 2008.

The city is the site of Franklin College, a four-year liberal arts college established in 1834 and the first in the state to admit women. Its students add to the life of the town and college events are open to the community.

The Daily Journal is the local newspaper in Franklin and also covers news in all of Johnson County.

== Government ==
The government consists of a mayor and a city council of seven members. The mayor is elected by citywide vote. Five city council members are elected from individual districts, and two are elected at-large.

== Education ==
Franklin Community Schools operates public schools serving almost all of the city, including Franklin Community High School. A small section in the north is assigned to Clark-Pleasant Community School Corporation, served by Whiteland Community High School.

Franklin Community Schools also operates 5 in-person elementary schools and 1 all-virtual school, being:

- Creekside Elementary
- Needham Elementary
- Webb Elementary
- Union Elementary
- Northwood Elementary
- Franklin Community Virtual School

The Franklin Community Virtual School also operates for grades 5–12.

Franklin has a public library, a branch of the Johnson County Public Library.

== Transportation ==
=== Highways ===
- Interstate 65 to Columbus, Indiana and Indianapolis
- U.S. Route 31 to Columbus, Indiana and Indianapolis
- State Road 44 to Shelbyville
- State Road 144 to Bargersville

=== Rail ===
Freight rail service is provided by the Louisville and Indiana Railroad (LIRC). The LIRC line traverses Franklin from north to south and roughly parallels U.S. 31 and Interstate 65.

=== Airport ===
Franklin Flying Field (FAA LID: 3FK) is located 3.5 miles (5.6 km) south of the city's central business district. The nearest commercial airport which currently has scheduled airline service is Indianapolis International Airport (IND), located approximately 28 miles (45 km) northwest of Franklin.

=== Transit ===
Access Johnson County provides fixed-route and demand-response bus services in the city.

== Notable people ==
- Steve Alford, former Indiana basketball player and coach
- Max Clark, 3 time Indiana Baseball Player of the Year, 2023 Gatorade Baseball Player of the Year, 2023 Gatorade Player of the Year (All Sports), #3 Overall draft pick of Detroit Tigers
- Austin Armacost, American reality television personality
- Clinton Lycurgus Armstrong, (b. 1844) Medal of Honor recipient for Siege of Vicksburg
- Homer Bone, U.S. Senator of Washington state (1933–44), was born in Franklin
- Roger D. Branigin, governor of Indiana (1965–1969)
- Anthony J. Bryant, historian of Japan and translator
- George Crowe (brother of Ray), was first Indiana Mr. Basketball in 1939
- Ray Crowe (brother of George), coach of Crispus Attucks High School basketball team
- Andrew Duggan, film and television actor
- Hal Fryar, actor and television personality
- Nick Hardwick, former center for the San Diego Chargers
- Carol Jenkins, murder victim
- Gordon Johncock, 1973 and 1982 Indianapolis 500 Winner, resided in Franklin
- Marjorie Main, actress, portrayed "Ma Kettle" in the Ma and Pa Kettle movies.
- Jon McGlocklin, professional basketball player
- Paul V. McNutt, governor of Indiana (1933–1937)
- Jesse Overstreet, U.S. Representative from 1895 to 1909
- Max Terhune, actor, appeared in National Barn Dance (1933)
- Forrest Tucker, film and television actor, star of TV series F Troop
- Fuzzy Vandivier, basketball player, elected to Basketball Hall of Fame
- Gene White, basketball player for 1954 state champion Milan Indians
- Thomas W. Woollen, Indiana Attorney General (1878–1880)

== Sister cities ==
Franklin currently has two sister cities:

- Kuji, Japan since October 1960
- Luqiao, China since April 2010
