= Johnson County Courthouse Square =

- U.S. National Register of Historic Places
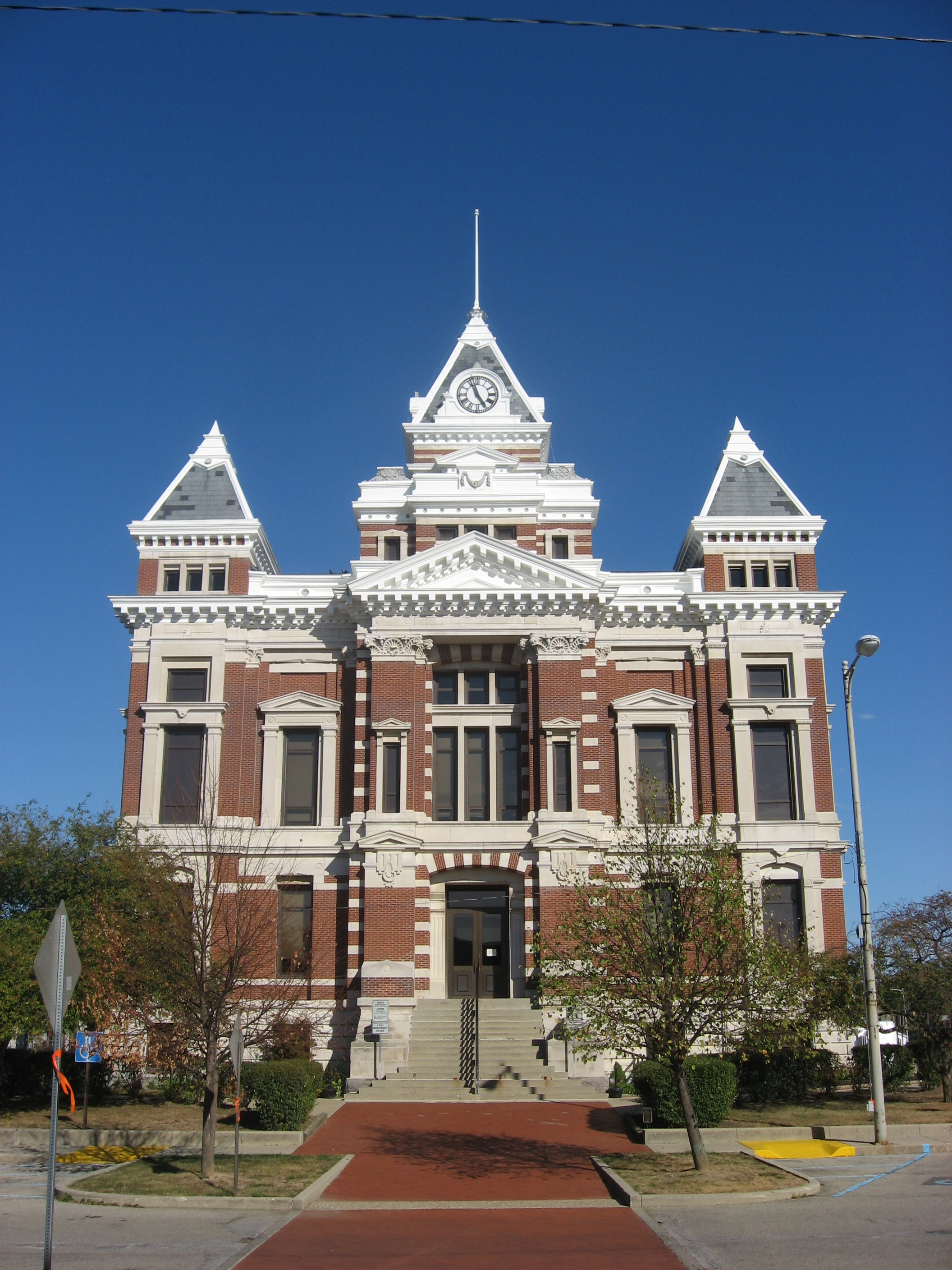
- Johnson County Courthouse, September 2010

- Location within Indiana Location within the United States
- Interactive map showing the location of Johnson County Courthouse Square
- Location: Courthouse Sq., Franklin, Indiana
- Coordinates: 39°28′48″N 86°3′18″W
- Area: 2 acres (0.81 ha)
- Built: 1879-1881
- Architect: Bunting, George W.
- Architectural style: Mixed (more Than 2 Styles From Different Periods)
- NRHP reference No.: 81000017
- Added to NRHP: April 16, 1981

Johnson County Courthouse Square is a historic courthouse and town square located in Franklin, Indiana. The courthouse was built between 1879 and 1881, and is a two-story, red brick building with elements of Second Empire, Neo-Jacobean, and Romanesque Revival style architecture. It has a low hipped metal roof topped by a central tower and with smaller corner towers topped with pyramidal roofs. It was designed by George W. Bunting, who also designed courthouses at Frankfort (Clinton County) and Anderson (Madison County).

It was listed on the National Register of Historic Places in 1981.
