= Bernard Hoffman =

American photographer (1913–1979)

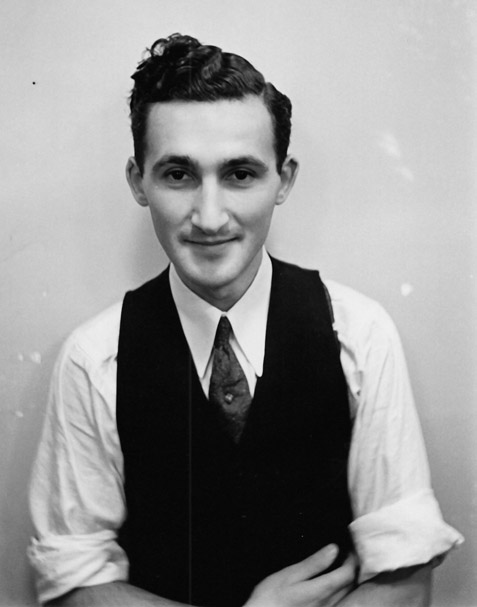
Bernard Hoffman (1913-1979)

Bernard Hoffman (1913–1979) was an American photographer and documentary photographer. The bulk of his photographic journalism was done during the first 18 years of the revamped Life magazine, starting in 1936. During this time he produced many photo essays, including a shoot with Carl Sandburg in 1938. He is, perhaps, most known as the first American photographer on the ground at Hiroshima and Nagasaki after the atomic bomb was dropped in 1945, providing some harrowing glimpses into the destructive power of the bomb.

After leaving Life in 1951, Hoffman went on to establish Bernard Hoffman Laboratories, a company dedicated to improving the technology for professional photography. The lab was well-known enough that in 1963 he was brought on to process film from the Kennedy assassination, leading to support for belief in the infamous "shooter on the grassy knoll." Following the sale of the lab in 1973, he spent his retirement years running photography workshops with his wife, Inez. Hoffman died of amyotrophic lateral sclerosis (also known as Lou Gehrig's disease) in 1979.

== Early life ==
Bernard Hoffman was born in New York City in 1913, and little is publicly known about his youth, besides the fact that he received a camera as a birthday present in 1931, when he was 18 years of age. Hoffman used the camera to snap photos of friends skinny dipping, but was told by the local shopkeeper that they would not develop the film into prints. He decided to take matters into his own hands and purchased a kit to develop the pictures himself. This incident would chart the course of his entire adult life.

In 1935, he accepted a job as staff photographer for Life, the first of the original four members of that department, as Henry Luce revamped the publication into an all-photographic American news magazine.

== Life Magazine ==
Hoffman was brought on board approximately one year before the relaunch of Life would turn the magazine from its original format into a photojournal of modern American life. In his role as staff photographer, Hoffman worked on dummy layouts and design elements prior to the reworked magazine's debut on November 23, 1936, as well as contributing photography for the first issue.

After the magazine's launch, Bernard Hoffman covered a dizzying number of assignments worldwide, ranging from the glamorous to the deadly. According to the International Center of Photography in a brochure for a Bernard Hoffman exhibit, "...politics, heavy industry, science, medicine, beauty, sports, animals, theatre, agriculture, art, photo-micrography, motion pictures. Name it, he did it."

Notable events during his 18 years with Life include:

- To illustrate an essay on the "World of Animals," he blindfolded a rattlesnake and stuffed cotton in a shark's nostrils.
- He reported the social effects of the dictatorship in Portugal during 1937.
- While on one of the first transatlantic commercial flights, aboard a Boeing flying boat, Hoffman had Archduke Otto von Habsburg hold his flashes while photographing the plane's interior. The flight took 19 hours to travel from New York City to the Azores in Portugal.
- Hoffman covered actor John Barrymore a number of times. During a performance of Barrymore's last play, My Dear Children, the actor had to run out on stage and kiss his then new wife, Elaine Barry, and run off stage again. With Hoffman in the audience, Barrymore performed the bit as usual, but then without any warning ran back out onto the stage and shouted to Hoffman, "Did you get that picture, Bernie?"
- In one day, Hoffman was given assignments with short deadlines in three different states. Editor Wilson Hicks gave him the advice, "If this is too tough, you can always cut your throat." Hoffman chartered a private plane to cover a rifle match, Gold Cup motorboat races, and a thigh operation.
- One of Hoffman's most cherished memories were that of poet Carl Sandburg, a man Hoffman referred to as "the only genius I have ever met." He and Sandburg became close friends, and Hoffman's photos of Sandburg singing to his goats in the living room became an instant classic Life photo essay in the February 21, 1938 issue, in which Hoffman also received a cover photo credit.
- The sculpture The Kiss, by Auguste Rodin, got Hoffman and Life in some trouble. His layouts on the art exhibition came out so lifelike that the magazine was temporarily banned in Boston and Argentina on morality grounds.
- Dropped via parachute behind enemy lines in the Burmese jungle in 1943, Hoffman brought back the story of the trapped battalion of Merrill's Marauders. On the way to the drop destination, Japanese Zeros shot the wheels off the plane he was in, which diverted the flight to a clearing behind the lines. Of the 500 men in the Marauders, only Hoffman and 35 others emerged from the jungle. Back home, his wife and Life editors had no word on his whereabouts for over eight weeks. Of this event, Hoffman quipped, "Risk? There was no risk, I had my press card!"
- To take a dangerous photo sequence of a 500 lb. bomb detonating, Hoffman placed his camera two and a half feet from the center of impact. When the bomb left the plane, he pressed the automatic shutter release and ran. The bomb exploded only 20 feet away from him, and when the dust cleared, he found the bomb had hit precisely where it was supposed to, getting Hoffman accolades for the innovative shots featured in Life's November 15, 1943 issue.
- Hoffman was on board the first low-level B-29 air raid on Japan.
- On special assignment, Hoffman was the first American photojournalist on the ground in Hiroshima and Nagasaki in 1945, recording the devastating effects of the atomic bomb blasts while the peace agreement was being signed aboard the USS Missouri. The results were featured on the cover, an in-depth photo essay, and as "Picture of the Week" in Life's October 15, 1945 issue. One tragically ironic photo captured the image of a seven-year-old's skeleton lying in the debris of her home, while a fragile vase sat untouched next to the body.
- As a correspondent under the watch of Major Tex McCrary, Hoffman was permitted to photograph the horrors of German's concentration camps. Said Hoffman of this assignment, "I try not to feel anything when I am taking pictures of something unpleasant. I detach myself and concentrate on the picture. After seeing the camps, many of the war correspondents wanted to stop right there, but it was important to continue and record everything."

Of Hoffman's photography in covering the war in the China-Burma-India Theatre, General "Vinegar" Joe Stilwell said, "It is the best collection of pictures of this type that I have ever seen."

Hoffman left Life in 1951 to pursue freelance photojournalism.

== Bernard Hoffman Laboratories and the JFK Assassination ==
Without the resources of Life's labs behind him, Hoffman very quickly found dissatisfaction with the development labs available to freelance and professional photographers. To remedy this, he founded Bernard Hoffman Laboratories (BHL), with the goal of providing the highest possible quality prints from negatives of all sorts.

BHL set an aggressive pace towards improving the technology of photography, and was earmarked as "one of the two most interesting and progressive labs going" by Minor White. The lab made several noteworthy additions to the field, including chemical formulas that made it possible to shoot full detail motion photos in low illumination, a montage process for combining many photographs without the need of airbrushing, a new lens design with the ability to focus from four inches to infinity, and process of bringing detail to badly under-exposed negatives.

During his tenure with the company, Hoffman gained such acclaim that his labs were used to process much of the footage from the assassination of John F. Kennedy in 1963. The resulting detailed prints led to the belief that a person aiming a rifle at the President stood atop a car behind a wall near the path of the motorcade.

Additionally, the United States Atomic Energy Commission regularly consulted BHL as an expert in important film and print analyses.

Hoffman sold the custom lab business and retired in 1973 after suffering a mild cardiac arrest.

== Late life ==
After officially retiring from business life, Bernard Hoffman published a book, The Man From Kankakee in 1973, chronicling the life of Romy Hammes, a self-made millionaire whom he had first met in 1938 when he photographed Hammes for Life.

Following this, he started a small home-based photography training course to teach new students the art in 1974, in partnership with his wife, Inez. One of his early students, John DeSanto, went on to become a well-known American photojournalist and is the former Director of Photography of the Times Herald-Record in Middletown, New York.

The training business closed in late 1978, due to Hoffman's deteriorating health. Hoffman died of amyotrophic lateral sclerosis (also known as Lou Gehrig's Disease) in November 1979.

== Posthumous works ==
His works are released since his death, like the aftermath photos of the atomic bombings of Hiroshima and Nagasaki, taken in September 1945.
