= Clark Township, Indiana =

Clark Township is the name of three townships in the U.S. state of Indiana:

- Clark Township, Johnson County, Indiana
- Clark Township, Montgomery County, Indiana
- Clark Township, Perry County, Indiana

See other places named Clark Township (disambiguation).
