= Greenwood, Indiana =

- City
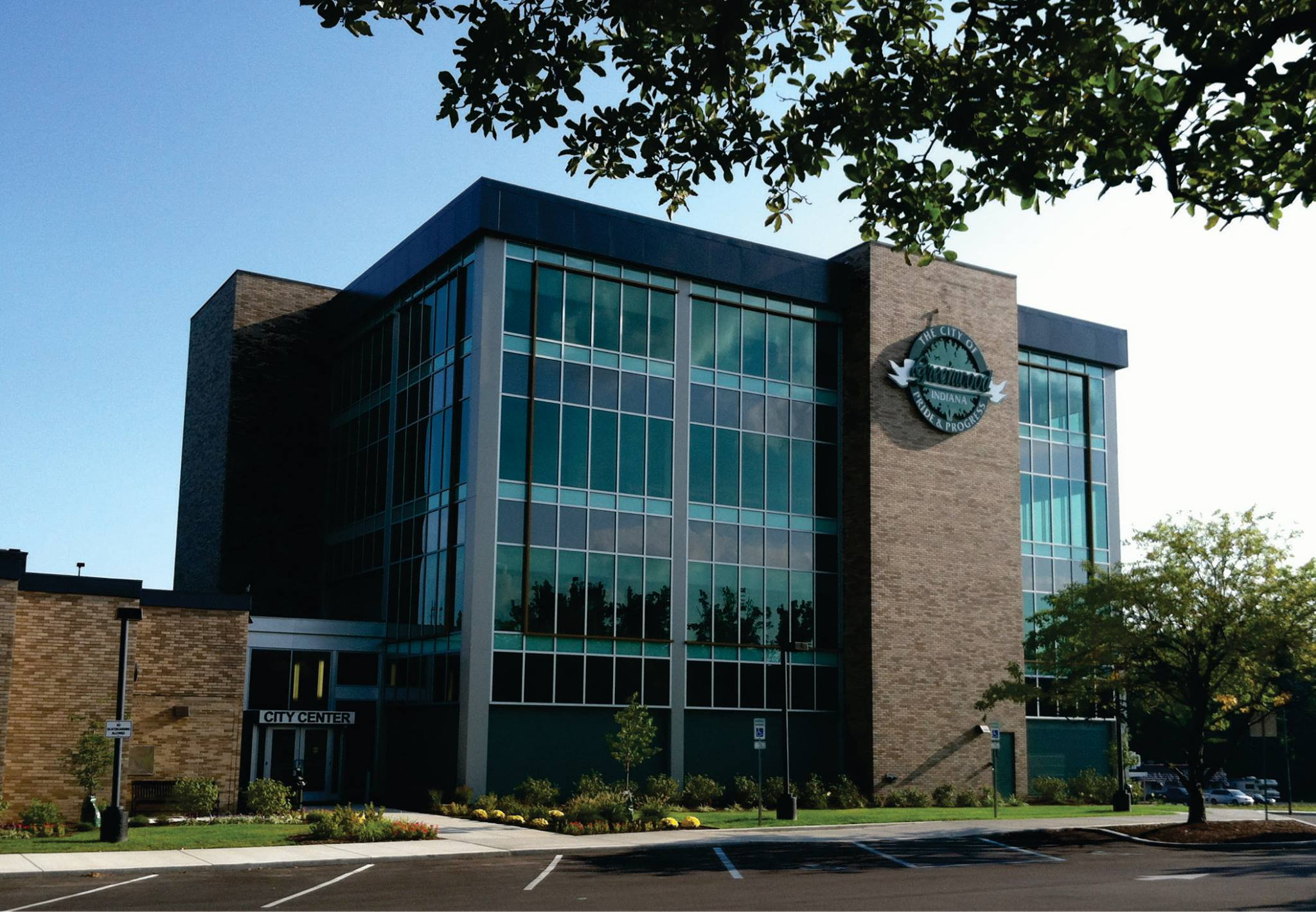
- Greenwood City Hall

- Flag Seal Logo
- Nickname: City of Pride and Progress
- Location of Greenwood in Johnson County, Indiana
- Coordinates: 39°36′41″N 86°07′05″W
- Country: United States
- State: Indiana
- County: Johnson
- Townships: Pleasant, White River, Clark

Government
  - Mayor: Mark W. Myers (R)

Area
  - Total: 27.91 sq mi (72.28 km^{2})
  - Land: 27.91 sq mi (72.28 km^{2})
  - Water: 0 sq mi (0.00 km^{2})
- Elevation: 804 ft (245 m)

Population (2020)
  - Total: 63,830
  - Density: 2,287.3/sq mi (883.12/km^{2})
- Time zone: UTC−5 (EST)
  - Summer (DST): UTC−4 (EDT)
- ZIP codes: 46142-46143
- Area code: 317
- FIPS code: 18-29898
- GNIS feature ID: 2394244
- Website: www.greenwood.in.gov

Greenwood is a city in Johnson County, Indiana, United States. The population was 63,830 at the 2020 Census. Greenwood is located southeast of central Indianapolis between Interstate 65 and Interstate 69. It is the most populous suburban municipality in the southern portion of the Indianapolis Metropolitan Area.

== History ==
The first inhabitants of the area currently known as Greenwood were the Delaware Indians (Lenape). In 1818, the Treaty of St. Mary's opened central Indiana to European American settlement, and by 1823 the first cabin in northern Johnson County was erected by settlers John B. and Isaac Smock on land now occupied by Greenwood Park Mall. Greenwood was first known as "Smocktown" or "Smock's Settlement" in honor of the Smock brothers, and became "Greenfield" in 1825. Since this clashed with another Greenfield located in Hancock County, the name of the settlement was changed to "Greenwood" in 1833.

Greenwood was incorporated as a town under Indiana law in 1864.

Greenwood was an early and key cog in the Electric Indianapolis Interurban Railway System. In 1895, Henry L. Smith proposed and organized the Indianapolis, Greenwood & Franklin Company and graded the line to Greenwood. The Indianapolis, Greenwood & Franklin Railway was opened between Indianapolis and Greenwood on January 1, 1900, and, according to Indianapolis historian Jacob Piatt Dunn, was the Hoosier capital's first real interurban electric railway. The railway followed what is now Madison Avenue.

The J.T. Polk Canning Company was essential to Greenwood's early growth. The cannery was a major employer and canned a variety of vegetables grown in Indiana. Later, the company expanded into the dairy market and provided milk delivery to customers. At one point the cannery was the largest canning operation west of Baltimore. The cannery was eventually purchased by the Stokely-Van Camp company and retained operations in Greenwood until the 1950s. Portions of the cannery are still standing on Main Street and have been repurposed for professional office space.

Greenwood became a fifth-class city in 1960.

In February 1965, an Indiana Civil Rights Commission report found that Greenwood had recently been one of 19 sundown towns in Indiana, where African Americans were not allowed to live or stay after dark. The city had been exclusively white since the 1920s. The report analyzes Greenwood's housing problem within African American families in the few years leading up to 1965. The analysis confirms a study regarding poorly constructed homes on the outskirts of Greenwood and a purchased house bought by an African American family that sold below $15,000. Racial tensions rose when the family introduced themselves to their new neighbors. In response, the neighbors presented the African American family with hostile threats. In the aftermath, the owners revoked their sale from the housing market.

Greenwood has long been a rightward-leaning community politically. After the founding of the John Birch Society in Indianapolis in 1958, a landmark for many years on the south side, adjacent to U.S. Route 31, was a Society billboard demanding "Get US out! of the United Nations".

Greenwood Commercial Historic District was listed on the National Register of Historic Places in 1991. This district encompasses 25 buildings and 3.2 acres (1.3 hectares).

In 2010, the Greenwood City Council approved a measure to change the official status of Greenwood to a second-class city in accordance with Indiana Code Title 36, Article 4, Chapter 1.

On July 17, 2022, three people were killed and two others wounded after a mass shooting occurred at the food court of Greenwood Park Mall. The gunman was subsequently shot and killed by an armed civilian who witnessed the shooting.

== Geography ==
=== Location and area ===
Greenwood is in northern Johnson County and occupies the northern half of Pleasant Township and the northeast portion of White River Township. The easternmost edge of Greenwood extends into Clark Township. It is bordered to the southwest by Bargersville, to the south by Whiteland and New Whiteland, and to the north, in Marion County, by the city of Indianapolis. Greenwood is 11 miles (18 km) south of Downtown Indianapolis and 12 miles (19 km) north of Franklin, the Johnson county seat.

According to the 2020 census, Greenwood has a total area of 27.91 square miles (72.29 km^{2}), of which 27.91 square miles (72.29 km^{2}) (or 100%) is land and 0.00 square miles (0.00 km^{2}) (or 0%) is water.

Greenwood's mean elevation is 804 feet (245 m) above sea level. The city's topography is flat to gently rolling.

=== Bodies of water ===
There are no navigable bodies of water within city limits. Several creeks run through the area and influence local drainage patterns, topography, and storm water management systems. Pleasant Run Creek flows from east to west across the northern half of the city, leading 5 miles (8 km) to the White River. Several municipal parks occupy the lowlands next to the creek. Grassy Creek and Tracy Ditch flow south from the city, connecting Greenwood to the towns of New Whiteland, Whiteland, and Franklin. Honey Creek originates in the southwest section of the city and after flowing through White River Township eventually joins the White River near the intersection of Smith Valley Road and Highway 37.

=== Climate ===
Greenwood's climate is classified as warm temperate (Cfa) by the Köppen-Geiger system, with an average annual temperature of 54.3 °F (12.4 °C). About 45 inches (1,100 mm) of precipitation falls annually, distributed fairly evenly throughout the year.

Climate data for Greenwood
Month	Jan	Feb	Mar	Apr	May	Jun	Jul	Aug	Sep	Oct	Nov	Dec	Year
Mean daily maximum °F (°C)	37.2 (2.9)	41.2 (5.1)	52.0 (11.1)	64.4 (18.0)	73.6 (23.1)	82.0 (27.8)	85.2 (29.6)	84.3 (29.1)	78.7 (25.9)	66.2 (19.0)	52.4 (11.3)	40.7 (4.8)	63.2 (17.3)
Daily mean °F (°C)	29.9 (−1.2)	32.7 (0.4)	42.7 (5.9)	54.2 (12.3)	64.2 (17.9)	72.8 (22.7)	76.4 (24.7)	75.5 (24.2)	68.8 (20.4)	56.5 (13.6)	43.9 (6.6)	33.5 (0.8)	54.3 (12.4)
Mean daily minimum °F (°C)	22.9 (−5.1)	24.7 (−4.1)	33.8 (1.0)	45.1 (7.3)	55.4 (13.0)	63.8 (17.7)	66.9 (19.4)	66.1 (18.9)	59.9 (15.5)	48.8 (9.3)	37.5 (3.1)	27.8 (−2.3)	46.1 (7.8)
Average precipitation inches (mm)	3.3 (84)	3.0 (76)	4.0 (100)	5.0 (130)	5.2 (130)	4.5 (110)	3.6 (91)	2.9 (74)	3.1 (79)	3.3 (84)	3.5 (89)	3.6 (91)	45 (1,138)
Average precipitation days (≥ 0.01 in)	7	7	8	9	10	9	9	7	6	6	7	8	93
Average relative humidity (%)	69	67	67	66	67	68	69	67	63	65	70	72	68
Mean daily sunshine hours	4.8	5.6	7.1	8.5	9.7	10.7	10.7	10.1	8.8	7.2	6.1	4.7	7.8
Source: Climate-Data.org

=== Parks ===
Over the years, Greenwood has constructed 17 parks that span upwards of 400 acres of land; furthermore, amongst these parks, there are more than 20 lineal miles of trailways for walking and biking, and many of them run through green spaces and wooded areas. Some of the parks, such as City Center Park or Freedom Park, provide children with the opportunity to have outdoor activity through amenities spanning anywhere from slides to splash pads.

1. Children's Garden Park: Located at 201 E Main St, this park offers a calm, natural environment for people located in the Old Town area. Fountains and other ornamental additions can be found throughout this park, and the gazebo can be rented for private events and gatherings.
2. City Center Park: Located on Lincoln St, City Center Park is found right along the outskirts of Downtown, Greenwood. This park offers a multitude of resources for children to play outside, and it is one of the parks that feature a splash pad.
3. Craig Park: Located at 10 E Smith Valley Rd, this park is one of the city's most known, including amenities such as playgrounds, tennis courts, pickleball courts, walkways, and more. Adults and children alike can utilize this space for outdoor activity, and it has rental options for the gazebo and shelters are available.
4. Freedom Park: Located at 850 W Stop 18 Rd, and Freedom Park's amenities are extensive, arguably making it one of the city's most popular outdoor attractions. Walking trails spanning 1.5 mi, a large playground, and various sporting courts and fields are available, this park surrounds Freedom Springs Aquatic Center - one of Greenwood's busiest summer attractions.
5. Grassy Creek Park: Located at 602 E Worthsville Rd, this park offers an outdoor area for residents closer to the Whiteland area. Sitting near Central Nine Education Center, Grassy Creek Park's 5 mi of trails give students and residents opportunities for outside exercise.
6. Northeast Park: Located at 100 Crestview Dr, this park is directly adjacent to Northeast Elementary School, and it spans 19 acres of land. Amenities include attractions such as a skate park, playground equipment, various sporting courts/fields, and two picnic shelters.
7. Northwest Park: Located at 1300 W Fry Rd, Northwest Park is one of the largest parks in greenwood, covering over 12 acres of land. This park can be described as having a much more open space for people to walk, featuring much more landscape than construction, but there is still a playground near the entrance off of Fry.
8. Northwest Park Annex: Located at 1576 W Fry Rd, this park is exclusively designed to attract those who want to walk in nature filled landscape. 20 acres of walking trails take park-goers into the forest, and much of the area is rather untouched by construction.
9. Old City Park: Located at 304 S Meridian St, Old City Park is a newly renovated attraction for residents of the Greenwood area. With extensive work done on landscaping, sidewalks, and playground equipment, this park showcases the amenities of a modern park.
10. Summerfield Park: Located at 275 W Worthsville Rd, Summerfield Park spans 16 acres of open land right outside of growing residential areas in Greenwood. This park showcases wide area for walking or other outside activity, and a large shelter house is available for rent.
11. Surina Square Park: Located at 100 Surina Way, this park is near many of Greenwood's local city resources, which include the following: Greenwood Community Center, Greenwood Amphitheater, Greenwood Police Department, Greenwood City Court, and Greenwood Fire Station 91. This park does not have many amenities, but its location is optimal during event season in the city.
12. Trails Park: Located at 1600 W Fry Road, Trails park is a small area designed for flood prevention. As a result, this park's two acres are only accessible by foot.
13. University Park: Located on 200 Legacy Blvd, this park covers 40 acres of land directly in between developed residential areas. Amenities include walking trails, a large playground, a dog park, and a basketball court. Additionally, a pavilion and shelter are both available for rent.
14. Westside Park: Located at 820 W Main St, this park is known for its walking paths along Pleasant Creek. In addition to its paths, varying sporting areas, picnicking options, playground equipment, and other amenities take up the 27 acres of park. Much like the other parks, Westside has a shelter available for rent.
15. Woodmen Park: Located at 720 Ashmore Dr, Woodmen park border the land directly next to Greenwood High School. This park offers multiple courts and fields for sporting activity, and it also holds a few playgrounds. Its shelter is available for rental.
16. Community Garden: Located at 1190 W Fry Rd, this garden is open to all members of the Greenwood community. Many organizations use this land to grow food for unprivileged populations, and it is also available for private use through rental.
17. Northeast Skatepark: Located at 100 Crestview Dr, this skatepark is a part of Northeast park, and it offers people the opportunity to skateboard on a concrete area. It has been recently renovated in 2021.

== Transportation ==
=== Transit ===
Access Johnson County provides fixed-route and demand-response bus services in the city.

IndyGo routes 16, 29, and 31 serve retail districts in northern Greenwood and offer transfers to Access Johnson County transit routes.

=== Road and street network ===
According to Greenwood's most recent Comprehensive Annual Financial Report, there were 209.6 miles (337.3 km) of public streets within the city limits as of 2015.

Major east-west arterial routes in Greenwood are not numbered and include County Line Road, Fry Road, Main Street, Smith Valley Road, Stop 18 Road, and Worthsville Road. Greenwood's system of east–west streets and roads link residents and businesses in White River Township with the business and neighborhoods adjacent to Interstate 65.

Most major north–south corridors in Greenwood are numbered and are not property of the city. U.S. 31, State Road 135, and Interstate 65 serve as the major north–south routes in the city. Greenwood owns and maintain three secondary corridors east of U.S. 31: Madison Avenue connects the Greenwood Park Mall to the Old Town Historic District; Emerson Avenue serves as a major commercial and business corridor and connects St. Francis Hospital in Indianapolis to Smith Valley Road; and Graham Road, located east of Interstate 65, connects County Line Road to Worthsville Road and serves several large distribution centers.

=== Interstate access ===
As of 2025, three exits of Interstate 65 are located in the eastern portion of Greenwood. The most recently constructed interchange, Exit 97 (Worthsville Road), features a diverging diamond traffic design. It is one of two such installations in Indiana. The remaining two interchanges, Exit 99 (Main Street) and Exit 101 (County Line Road), use conventional diamond and parclo A4 configurations, respectively. All three interchanges serve major commercial and industrial zones in the city.

Two exits of Interstate 69 are located just to the west of Greenwood city limits: Exit 156 (Smith Valley Road) and Exit 158 (County Line Road).

=== Airport ===
- KHFY – Indy South Greenwood Airport

=== Railroad ===
Freight rail service is provided by the Louisville and Indiana Railroad (LIRC). The LIRC line traverses Greenwood from north to south and roughly parallels U.S. 31 and Interstate 65.

== Demographics ==
Historical population
Census	Pop.	Note	%±
1880	448		—
1890	862		92.4%
1900	1,503		74.4%
1910	1,608		7.0%
1920	1,907		18.6%
1930	2,377		24.6%
1940	2,499		5.1%
1950	3,066		22.7%
1960	7,169		133.8%
1970	11,869		65.6%
1980	19,327		62.8%
1990	26,265		35.9%
2000	36,037		37.2%
2010	49,791		38.2%
2020	63,830		28.2%
U.S. Decennial Census

=== 2020 census ===
As of the 2020 census, Greenwood had a population of 63,830. The median age was 35.2 years. 25.2% of residents were under the age of 18 and 14.6% of residents were 65 years of age or older. For every 100 females there were 93.5 males, and for every 100 females age 18 and over there were 90.6 males age 18 and over.

99.5% of residents lived in urban areas, while 0.5% lived in rural areas.

There were 24,727 households in Greenwood, of which 34.5% had children under the age of 18 living in them. Of all households, 47.1% were married-couple households, 17.7% were households with a male householder and no spouse or partner present, and 27.2% were households with a female householder and no spouse or partner present. About 27.8% of all households were made up of individuals and 10.3% had someone living alone who was 65 years of age or older.

There were 25,980 housing units, of which 4.8% were vacant. The homeowner vacancy rate was 1.0% and the rental vacancy rate was 7.2%.

Racial composition as of the 2020 census
Race	Number	Percent
White	49,612	77.7%
Black or African American	2,732	4.3%
American Indian and Alaska Native	167	0.3%
Asian	5,729	9.0%
Native Hawaiian and Other Pacific Islander	46	0.1%
Some other race	1,413	2.2%
Two or more races	4,131	6.5%
Hispanic or Latino (of any race)	3,475	5.4%

=== 2010 Census ===
As of the census of 2010, there were 49,791 people, 19,615 households, and 12,845 families residing in the city. The population density was 2,345.3 inhabitants per square mile (905.5/km^{2}). There were 21,339 housing units at an average density of 1,005.1 per square mile (388.1/km^{2}). The racial makeup of the city was 91.1% White, 1.7% African American, 0.3% Native American, 3.7% Asian, 0.1% Pacific Islander, 2.1% from other races, and 2.1% from two or more races. Hispanic or Latino of any race were 4.0% of the population.

There were 19,615 households, of which 35.7% had children under the age of 18 living with them, 49.2% were married couples living together, 11.6% had a female householder with no husband present, 4.8% had a male householder with no wife present, and 34.5% were non-families. 27.8% of all households were made up of individuals, and 8.9% had someone living alone who was 65 years of age or older. The average household size was 2.51 and the average family size was 3.09.

The median age in the city was 34 years. 26.6% of residents were under the age of 18; 9% were between the ages of 18 and 24; 29.8% were from 25 to 44; 23.1% were from 45 to 64; and 11.6% were 65 years of age or older. The gender makeup of the city was 48.4% male and 51.6% female.

=== 2000 Census ===
As of the census of 2000, there were 36,037 people, 14,931 households, and 9,600 families residing in the city. The population density was 2,524.8 inhabitants per square mile (974.8/km^{2}). There were 16,042 housing units at an average density of 1,123.9 per square mile (433.9/km^{2}). The racial makeup of the city was 96.54% White, 0.44% African American, 0.19% Native American, 1.36% Asian, 0.04% Pacific Islander, 0.69% from other races, and 0.74% from two or more races. Hispanic or Latino of any race were 1.91% of the population.

There were 14,931 households, out of which 32.4% had children under the age of 18 living with them, 51.0% were married couples living together, 9.9% had a female householder with no husband present, and 35.7% were non-families. 29.9% of all households were made up of individuals, and 9.9% had someone living alone who was 65 years of age or older. The average household size was 2.37 and the average family size was 2.97.

In the city, the population was spread out, with 25.3% under the age of 18, 9.6% from 18 to 24, 32.1% from 25 to 44, 20.7% from 45 to 64, and 12.3% who were 65 years of age or older. The median age was 34 years. For every 100 females, there were 91.9 males. For every 100 females age 18 and over, there were 87.6 males.

The median income for a household in the city was $46,176, and the median income for a family was $57,298. Males had a median income of $40,291 versus $28,936 for females. The per capita income for the city was $23,003. About 4.6% of families and 7.0% of the population were below the poverty line, including 8.5% of those under age 18 and 9.4% of those age 65 or over

== Economic environment ==
=== Top employment sectors ===
According to the Johnson County Chamber of Commerce's Labor Force Report, in 2023 Greenwood had a total of 3,176 business establishments, employing 25,386 individuals. The principal employers in the city by Standard Industrial Classification categories are:

Rank	SIC Categories	# of employees	% of total employment
1	Services (SIC Range 70–89)	8,896	35.04%
2	Retail Trade (SIC 52–59)	7,226	28.46%
3	Transportation and Communications (SIC 40–49)	2,382	9.38%
4	Construction (SIC 15–17)	2,220	8.74%
5	Finance, Insurance, and Real Estate (SIC 60–69)	2,108	8.30%
6	Manufacturing (SIC 20–39)	1,081	4.26%
7	Wholesale Trade (SIC 50–51)	1,046	4.12%
8	Agricultural, Forestry, Fishing (SIC 01–09)	214	0.84%
9	Public Administration (SIC 90–98)	211	0.83%

=== Notable businesses ===
Greenwood is home to the headquarters or other major facilities for several large businesses. The U.S. headquarters for Swiss process automation company Endress+Hauser is located in the southern portion of the city, immediately east of US 31 between Worthsville Road and Pushville Road. In 2014, the company completed construction of a new 80,000 square feet (7,400 m^{2}) customer center on its Greenwood Campus. Nachi Fujikoshi's subsidiary Nachi America Inc., a producer of machine tools, maintains its corporate campus and manufacturing facilities on Pushville Road in Greenwood. Amazon operates a fulfillment center near Worthsville Road and Interstate 65 that employs around 1,000 people. In late 2020, power tool manufacturer Milwaukee Electric Tool established its second U.S. service hub at Greenwood's Southtech Business Park; the facility commenced operations in May 2021.

Four craft breweries are located within Greenwood, including Oaken Barrel Brewing Co., which has called Greenwood home since its opening in 1994. Oaken Barrel is the second oldest brewpub in Indiana.

In the fall of 2022, the home office of CALLERLAB, the International Association of Square Dance Callers, moved from Topeka, Kansas to an office complex near Emerson Avenue and Main Street in Greenwood.

== Education ==
=== Educational attainment ===
91.1% of Greenwood residents are high school graduates or higher. 31.1% of residents have attained a bachelor's degree or higher.

=== Public schools ===
Three public school corporations serve Greenwood residents: Greenwood Community School Corporation, Clark-Pleasant Community School Corporation, and Center Grove Community School Corporation.

==== Greenwood Community School Corporation ====
High School

- Greenwood Community High School

Middle School

- Greenwood Community Middle School

Elementary Schools

- Southwest Elementary School
- Northeast Elementary School
- V.O. Isom Elementary School
- Westwood Elementary School

==== Clark-Pleasant Community School Corporation ====
High School

- Whiteland Community High School

Middle School

- Clark-Pleasant Middle School

Elementary Schools

- Clark Elementary School
- Grassy Creek Elementary School
- Pleasant Crossing Elementary School

==== Center Grove Community School Corporation ====
High School

- Center Grove High School

Middle Schools

- Center Grove Middle School Central
- Center Grove Middle School North

Elementary Schools

- Center Grove Elementary School
- North Grove Elementary School
- Pleasant Grove Elementary School
- Sugar Grove Elementary School
- Maple Grove Elementary School
- Walnut Grove Elementary School

=== Private schools ===
- Our Lady of Greenwood – Preschool – 8th grade
- St. Francis and Clare Catholic School – Preschool – 8th grade
- Greenwood Christian Academy – K-12
- Suburban Christian School – Preschool – 12th grade

=== Colleges and universities ===
- Indiana Baptist College
- Indiana Institute of Technology (regional campus)
- Indiana Wesleyan University (regional education and conference center)

=== Public library ===
The city is served by the Greenwood Public Library. The Johnson County Public Library also operates a separate branch within Greenwood city limits.

== See also ==
- Greenwood Park Mall
- Indianapolis metropolitan area
- List of sundown towns in the United States
