= New Whiteland, Indiana =

- Town
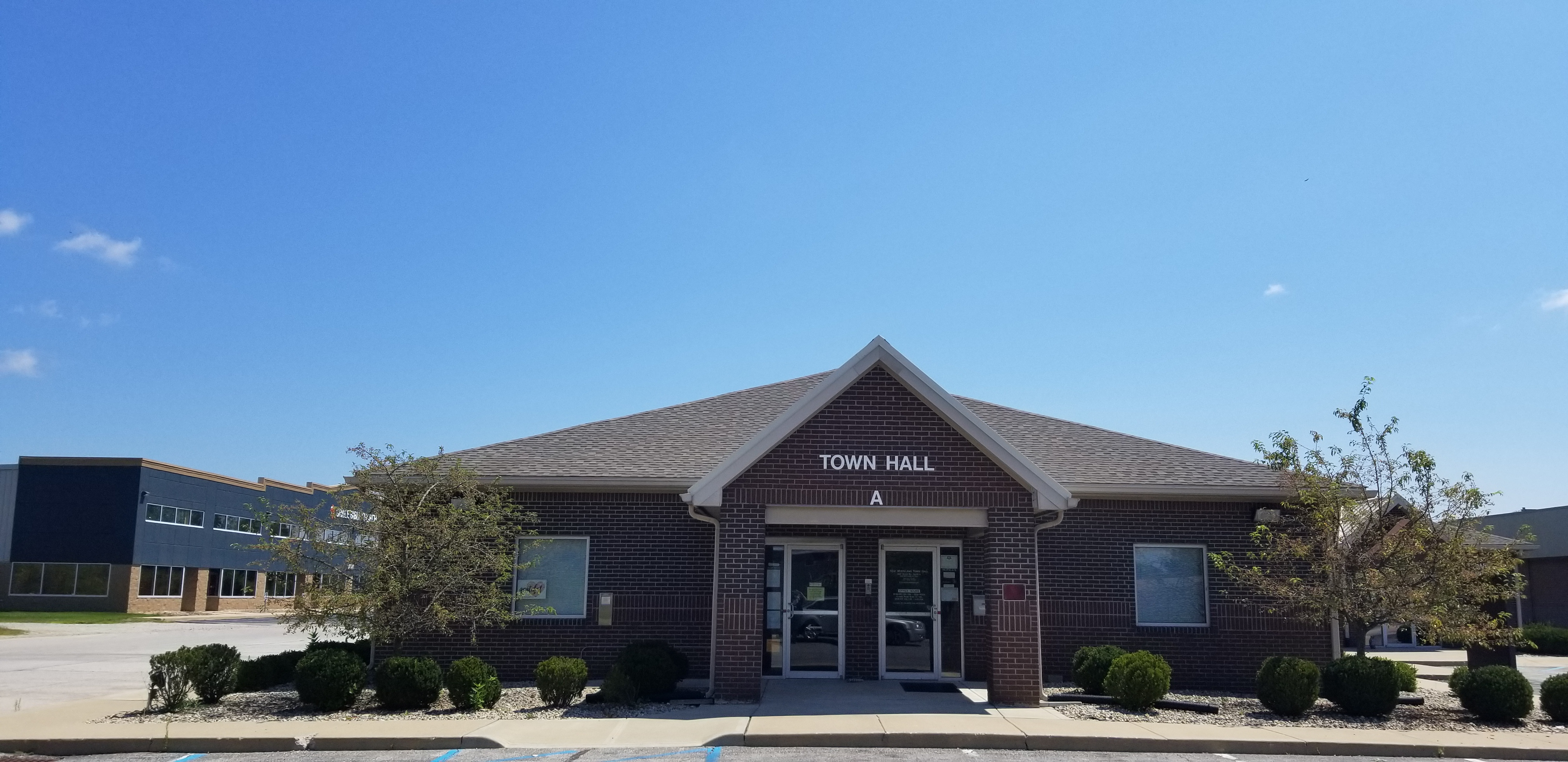
- Town Hall

- Location of New Whiteland in Johnson County, Indiana
- Coordinates: 39°33′42″N 86°05′58″W
- Country: United States
- State: Indiana
- County: Johnson
- Township: Pleasant
- Incorporated: 1954

Area
  - Total: 1.45 sq mi (3.76 km^{2})
  - Land: 1.45 sq mi (3.76 km^{2})
  - Water: 0 sq mi (0.00 km^{2})
- Elevation: 801 ft (244 m)

Population (2020)
  - Total: 5,550
  - Density: 3,819.7/sq mi (1,474.81/km^{2})
- Time zone: UTC-5 (Eastern (EST))
  - Summer (DST): UTC-4 (EDT)
- ZIP code: 46184
- Area code: 317
- FIPS code: 18-53874
- GNIS feature ID: 2396810
- Website: www.in.gov/towns/new-whiteland/

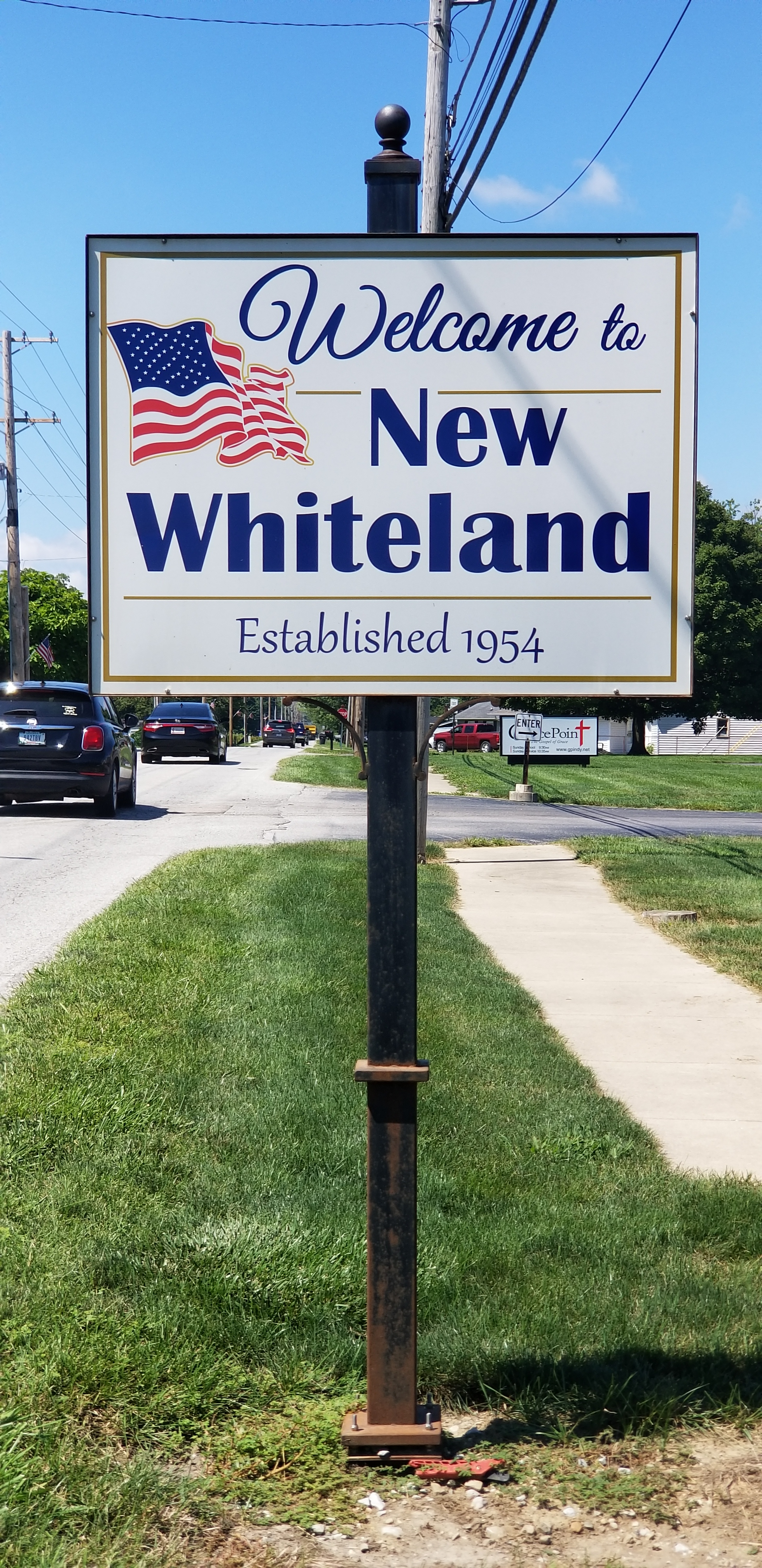
Welcome to New Whiteland sign

New Whiteland is a town in Pleasant Township, Johnson County, Indiana, United States. The population was 5,550 at the 2020 census.

== History ==
New Whiteland had its start when US 31 was rerouted through the area. It was incorporated as a town in 1954.

On January 19, 1994, the temperature in New Whiteland fell to -36 °F (-38 °C), the coldest temperature ever recorded in the state of Indiana.

== Geography ==
According to the 2010 census, New Whiteland has a total area of 1.46 square miles (3.78 km^{2}), all land.

== Demographics ==
Historical population
Census	Pop.	Note	%±
1960	3,488		—
1970	4,200		20.4%
1980	4,502		7.2%
1990	4,097		−9.0%
2000	4,579		11.8%
2010	5,472		19.5%
2020	5,550		1.4%
U.S. Decennial Census

=== 2020 census ===
As of the 2020 census, New Whiteland had a population of 5,550. The median age was 35.4 years. 27.2% of residents were under the age of 18 and 13.4% of residents were 65 years of age or older. For every 100 females there were 95.6 males, and for every 100 females age 18 and over there were 94.0 males age 18 and over.

100.0% of residents lived in urban areas, while 0.0% lived in rural areas.

There were 2,029 households in New Whiteland, of which 38.8% had children under the age of 18 living in them. Of all households, 53.0% were married-couple households, 15.6% were households with a male householder and no spouse or partner present, and 23.4% were households with a female householder and no spouse or partner present. About 20.8% of all households were made up of individuals and 9.6% had someone living alone who was 65 years of age or older.

There were 2,068 housing units, of which 1.9% were vacant. The homeowner vacancy rate was 0.8% and the rental vacancy rate was 1.3%.

Racial composition as of the 2020 census
Race	Number	Percent
White	4,969	89.5%
Black or African American	65	1.2%
American Indian and Alaska Native	12	0.2%
Asian	91	1.6%
Native Hawaiian and Other Pacific Islander	2	0.0%
Some other race	82	1.5%
Two or more races	329	5.9%
Hispanic or Latino (of any race)	191	3.4%

=== 2010 census ===
As of the census of 2010, there were 5,472 people, 1,905 households, and 1,489 families living in the town. The population density was 3,747.9 inhabitants per square mile (1,447.1/km^{2}). There were 2,015 housing units at an average density of 1,380.1 per square mile (532.9/km^{2}). The racial makeup of the town was 96.6% White, 0.4% African American, 0.1% Native American, 1.0% Asian, 0.5% from other races, and 1.4% from two or more races. Hispanic or Latino of any race were 2.0% of the population.

There were 1,905 households, of which 43.8% had children under the age of 18 living with them, 60.0% were married couples living together, 12.1% had a female householder with no husband present, 6.0% had a male householder with no wife present, and 21.8% were non-families. 17.8% of all households were made up of individuals, and 7.6% had someone living alone who was 65 years of age or older. The average household size was 2.87 and the average family size was 3.22.

The median age in the town was 33.7 years. 29.8% of residents were under the age of 18; 7.6% were between the ages of 18 and 24; 29.6% were from 25 to 44; 22.6% were from 45 to 64; and 10.4% were 65 years of age or older. The gender makeup of the town was 48.6% male and 51.4% female.

=== 2000 census ===
As of the census of 2000, there were 4,579 people, 1,556 households, and 1,311 families living in the town. The population density was 4,560 inhabitants per square mile (1,760/km^{2}). There were 1,594 housing units at an average density of 1,296.9 per square mile (500.7/km^{2}). The racial makeup of the town was 98.82% White, 0.28% Native American, 0.31% Asian, 0.07% Pacific Islander, 0.13% from other races, and 0.39% from two or more races. Hispanic or Latino of any race were 0.85% of the population.

There were 1,556 households, out of which 44.6% had children under the age of 18 living with them, 70.4% were married couples living together, 10.8% had a female householder with no husband present, and 15.7% were non-families. 12.3% of all households were made up of individuals, and 5.2% had someone living alone who was 65 years of age or older. The average household size was 2.94 and the average family size was 3.18.

In the town, the population was spread out, with 30.6% under the age of 18, 7.4% from 18 to 24, 33.4% from 25 to 44, 19.6% from 45 to 64, and 9.0% who were 65 years of age or older. The median age was 33 years. For every 100 females, there were 93.8 males. For every 100 females age 18 and over, there were 93.9 males.

The median income for a household in the town was $52,907, and the median income for a family was $53,645. Males had a median income of $39,382 versus $26,042 for females. The per capita income for the town was $18,221. About 2.7% of families and 3.0% of the population were below the poverty line, including 4.4% of those under age 18 and 6.6% of those age 65 or over.

== Education ==
New Whiteland is served by the Clark-Pleasant Community School Corporation, including Break-O-Day Elementary School in New Whiteland, Clark-Pleasant Middle School in Greenwood, and Whiteland Community High School in Whiteland.

New Whiteland has a public library, a branch of the Johnson County Public Library.
