= Clark-Pleasant Community School Corporation =

School district in Indiana

Coordinates: 39°33′01.8″N 86°04′49.4″W

Clark-Pleasant Community School Corporation (CPCSC) is a school district headquartered in Whiteland, Indiana. It serves Whiteland, New Whiteland, portions of Greenwood, and a very small section of Franklin.

== Schools ==
Secondary schools:

- Whiteland Community High School (Whiteland)
- Clark-Pleasant Middle School (Greenwood)

Elementary schools:

- Break-O-Day Elementary School (New Whiteland)
- Clark Elementary School (unincorporated area, Franklin address)
- Grassy Creek Elementary School (Greenwood)
- Pleasant Crossing Elementary School (Greenwood, Whiteland address)
- Whiteland Elementary School (Whiteland)
