= Reds Corner, Indiana =

- Unincorporated town
- Location within Indiana Location within the United States
- Coordinates: 39°36′04″N 85°58′18″W
- Country: United States
- State: Indiana
- County: Johnson
- Township: Clark
- Elevation: 768 ft (234 m)
- ZIP code: 46143
- FIPS code: 18-63500
- GNIS feature ID: 441839

Reds Corner is an unincorporated town in Clark Township, Johnson County, Indiana.
