= Indiana State School Music Association =

Indiana State School Music Association (ISSMA)
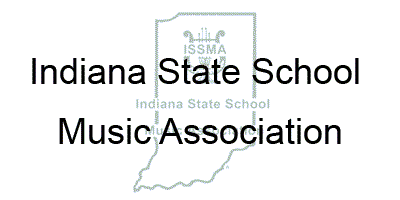
- Logo of ISSMA
- Formation: July 1981; 45 years ago
- Legal status: Active
- Purpose: Music Education
- Headquarters: Indianapolis, Indiana
- Coordinates: 39.7684°N 86.1581°W
- Region served: Indiana
- Executive Director: Mick Bridgewater
- President: Glenn Northern (Penn High School)
- Vice President: Peter Sampson (Whiteland Community High School)
- Past President: Michael Pote (Carmel High School)
- Website: ISSMA website

The Indiana State School Music Association, Inc. is a scholastic music association, with a mission to provide educationally evaluated music performance activities for the students and teachers of the state of Indiana, to assist in the development of performance-oriented assessment of state and national musical academic standards, and to offer educational support to fulfill this mission. The Northern Indiana School Band, Orchestra, and Vocal Association was integrated into the ISSMA in 1980.

ISSMA-sponsored events and contests include Solo & Ensemble auditions, Marching band festivals and competitions leading to the ISSMA State Finals, and Concert Choir, Orchestra, and Band State Finals. The Indiana Marching Band State Finals for open class are held at Lucas Oil Stadium in Indianapolis, while the state finals for scholastic class is held at Franklin Central High School in Indianapolis. State Concert Organizational Finals events are held at varying locations in Indianapolis.
