= Clark Township, Arkansas =

Clark Township, Arkansas may refer to:

- Clark Township, Clay County, Arkansas
- Clark Township, Greene County, Arkansas
- Clark Township, Logan County, Arkansas
- Clark Township, Pike County, Arkansas
- Clark Township, Pope County, Arkansas
- Clark Township, Searcy County, Arkansas

== See also ==
- List of townships in Arkansas
- Clark Township (disambiguation)
