= Clark Township, Minnesota =

Clark Township is the name of some places in the U.S. state of Minnesota:

- Clark Township, Aitkin County, Minnesota
- Clark Township, Faribault County, Minnesota

== See also ==
- Clark Township (disambiguation)
