= Lucas Oil Stadium =

Stadium in Indianapolis, Indiana

- The House That Peyton Built

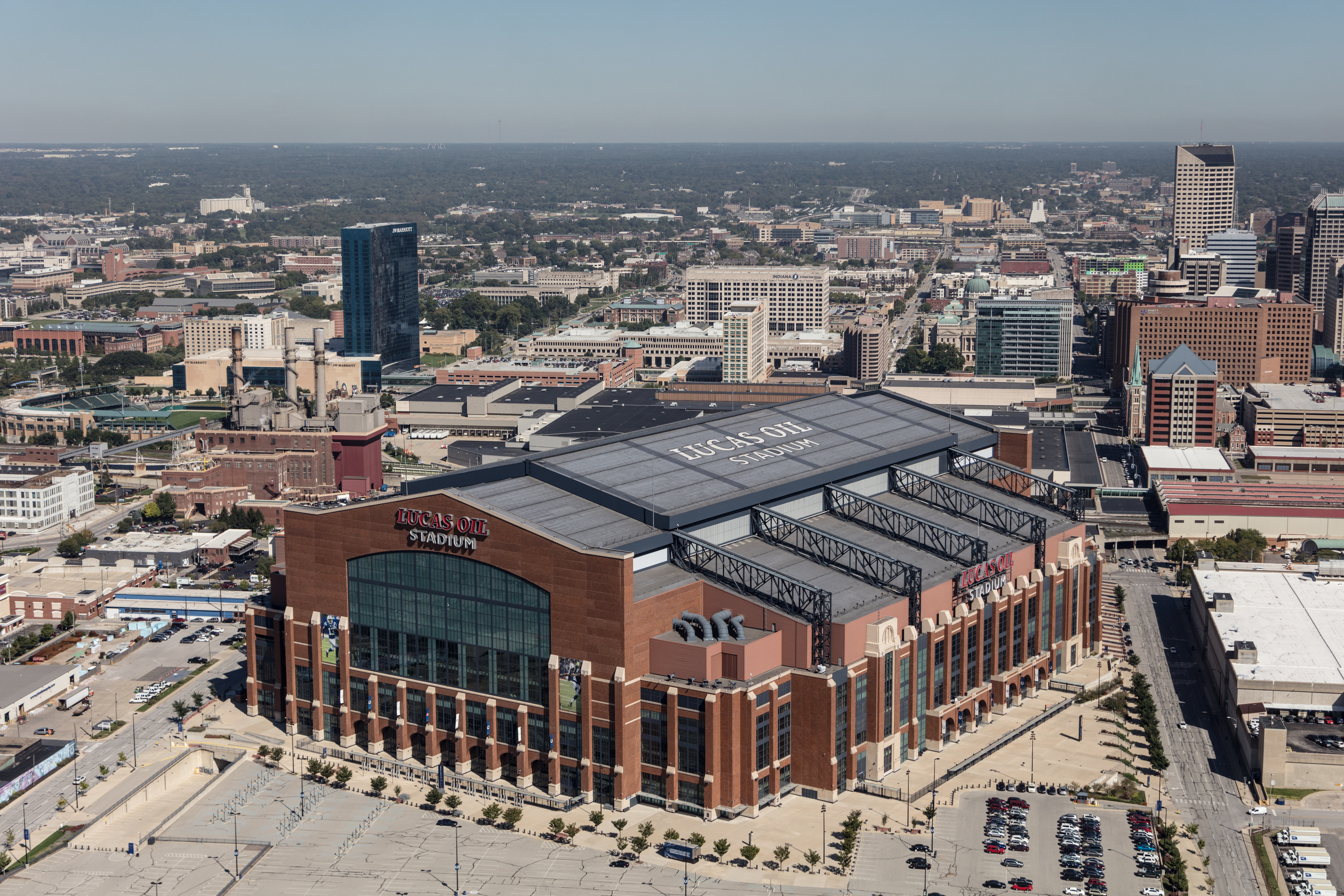
- Lucas Oil Stadium in 2016

- Location in Indianapolis Location in Indiana Location in the United States
- Address: 500 South Capitol Avenue
- Location: Indianapolis, Indiana, U.S.
- Coordinates: 39°45′36.2″N 86°9′49.7″W
- Owner: Indiana Stadium and Convention Building Authority (State of Indiana)
- Operator: Capital Improvement Board of Managers of Marion County, Indiana
- Capacity: Basketball: 70,000; American football: 63,000; Marching band: 24,000 (approx)
- Executive suites: 139
- Roof: Retractable
- Surface: FieldTurf (2008–2018); Shaw Sports Momentum Pro (2018–2024); Hellas Matrix Turf (2024–present)
- Public transit: 24

Construction
- Groundbreaking: September 20, 2005
- Opened: August 16, 2008; 18 years ago
- Cost: US$720 million ($1.06 billion in 2025 dollars)
- Architects: HKS; A2so4 Architecture; Browning Day Mullins Dierdorf, Inc.
- Project manager: John Klipsch Consulting LLC
- Structural engineers: Walter P Moore/Fink Roberts & Petrie
- Services engineer: Moore Engineers PC
- General contractor: Hunt/Smoot/Mezzetta

Tenants
- Indianapolis Colts (NFL) (2008–present); Indy Eleven (USLC) (2018–2020)

Website
- lucasoilstadium.com

Lucas Oil Stadium is a retractable roof stadium in Indianapolis, Indiana, United States. It replaced the RCA Dome as the home field of the Indianapolis Colts of the National Football League (NFL). It opened on August 16, 2008. The stadium was constructed to allow the removal of the RCA Dome and expansion of the Indiana Convention Center on its site. It is located on the south side of South Street, a block south of the former site of the RCA Dome. The stadium's naming rights belong to the Lucas Oil corporation.

Architectural firm HKS was responsible for the stadium's design, with Walter P Moore working as a structural engineer. The field surface was originally FieldTurf; it was replaced with Shaw Sports Momentum Pro in 2018. In 2024, it became the first indoor NFL venue to use geofill when Hellas Matrix Turf was installed. The exterior of the stadium is faced with a reddish-brown brick trimmed with Indiana limestone, similar to several other sports venues in the area, including Gainbridge Fieldhouse, Hinkle Fieldhouse and Corteva Coliseum.

== Name ==
The home field of the Indianapolis Colts for their first 24 seasons in the city (1984–2007) was the RCA Dome (formerly the Hoosier Dome), which was part of the Indiana Convention Center. In 2006, prior to the new stadium's construction, Lucas Oil, a manufacturer and distributor of automotive oil, additives and lubricants headquartered in Indianapolis, secured the naming rights for the stadium at a cost of $122 million over the next 20 years.

== Features ==
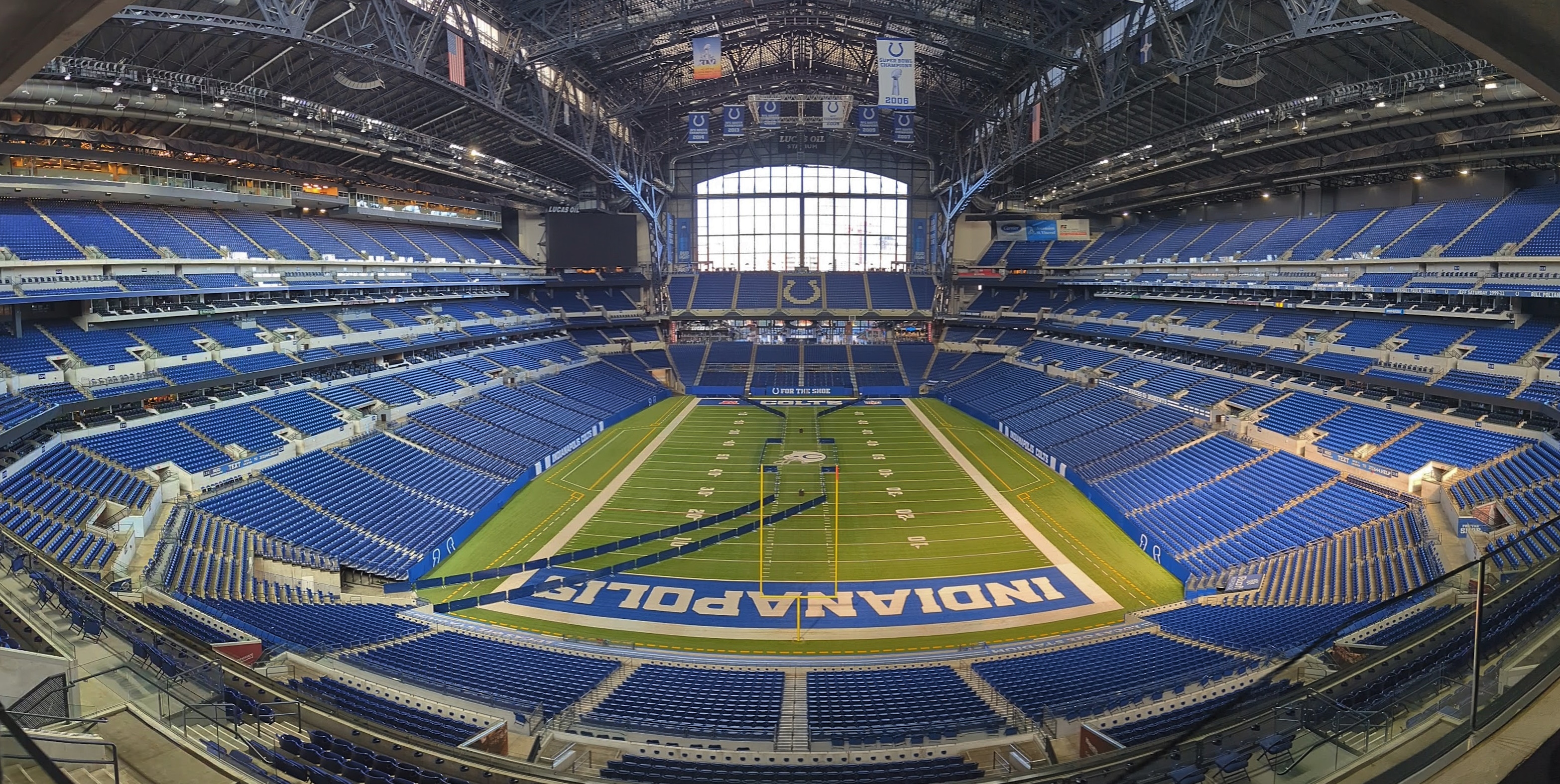
Interior of Lucas Oil Stadium

Lucas Oil Stadium has a seating capacity of 63,000, and covers approximately 1.8 million square feet (170,000 m^{2}). The stadium offers 139 suites, two club lounges, two exhibit halls and 12 meeting rooms. There are also 360-degree ribbon boards and two 53-foot (16 m) tall HD video boards. An underground walkway directly connects the stadium to the Indiana Convention Center.

Other features include:

- 183,000 square feet (17,000 m^{2}) of exhibit space
- 7 locker rooms
- 11 indoor truck docks
- 14 escalators
- 11 passenger elevators
- 2 accessible pedestrian ramps

=== Retractable roof ===
The stadium's retractable roof can open or close in about 11 minutes. It is composed of two panels that each weigh 2.5 million pounds (1,100,000 kg). The home team determines if the roof is to be opened or closed 90 minutes before kickoff.

=== Retractable window ===
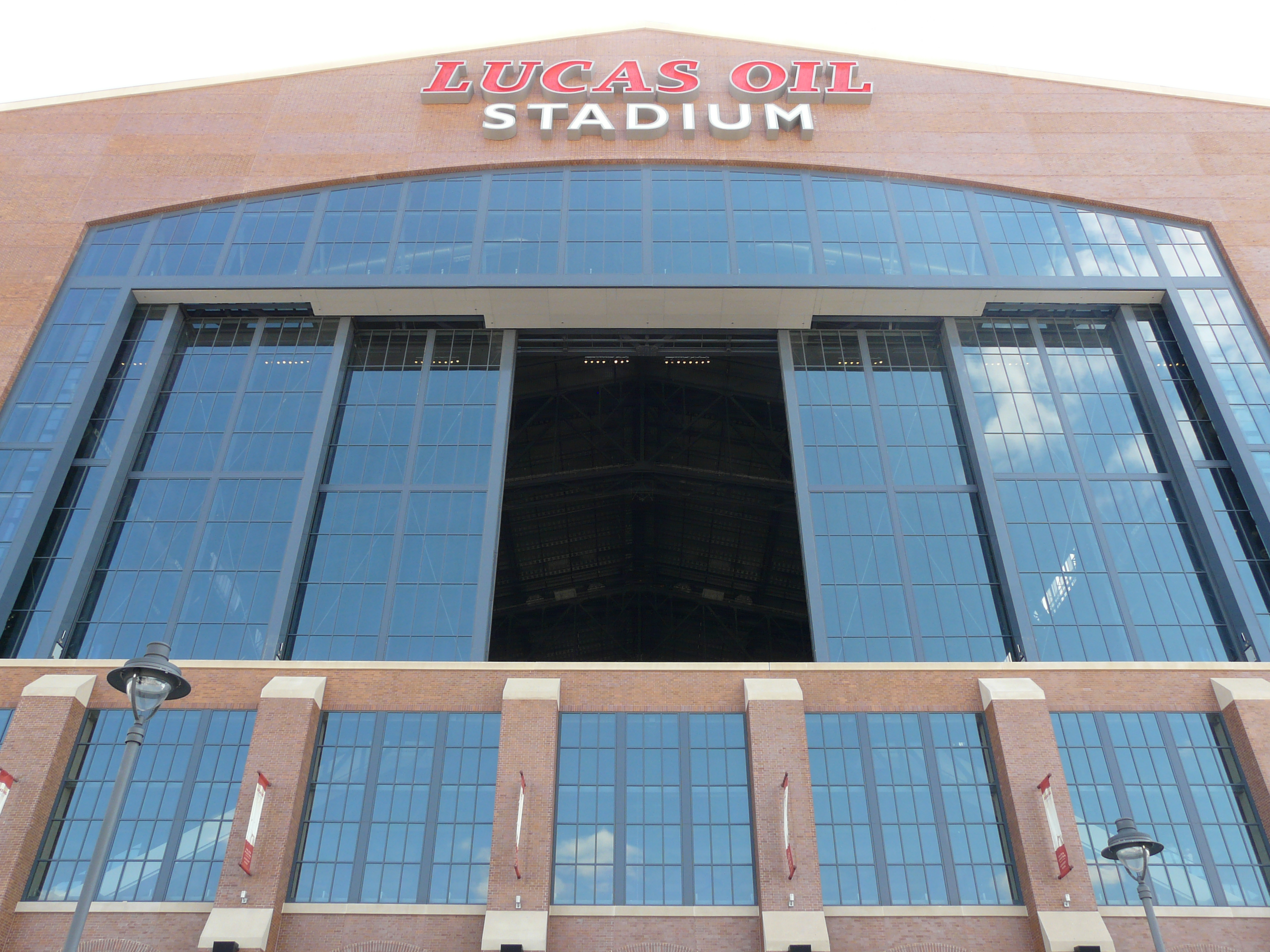
Visitors can view the Indianapolis skyline through the northeast retractable window.

The retractable north window offers a view of downtown Indianapolis during games, concerts and other events due to the stadium's angled position on the city block.

=== Gate sponsorship ===
The four gates leading into Lucas Oil Stadium are each named for one of the team's corporate partners;

- Lucas Oil (north gate)
- Huntington Bank (west gate)
- Caesars Entertainment (south gate)
- Verizon Wireless (east gate)

The ground-level concourses of their respective gates feature banners and floor coverings with the corporations' logos, advertisements and merchandise displays.

== Events ==
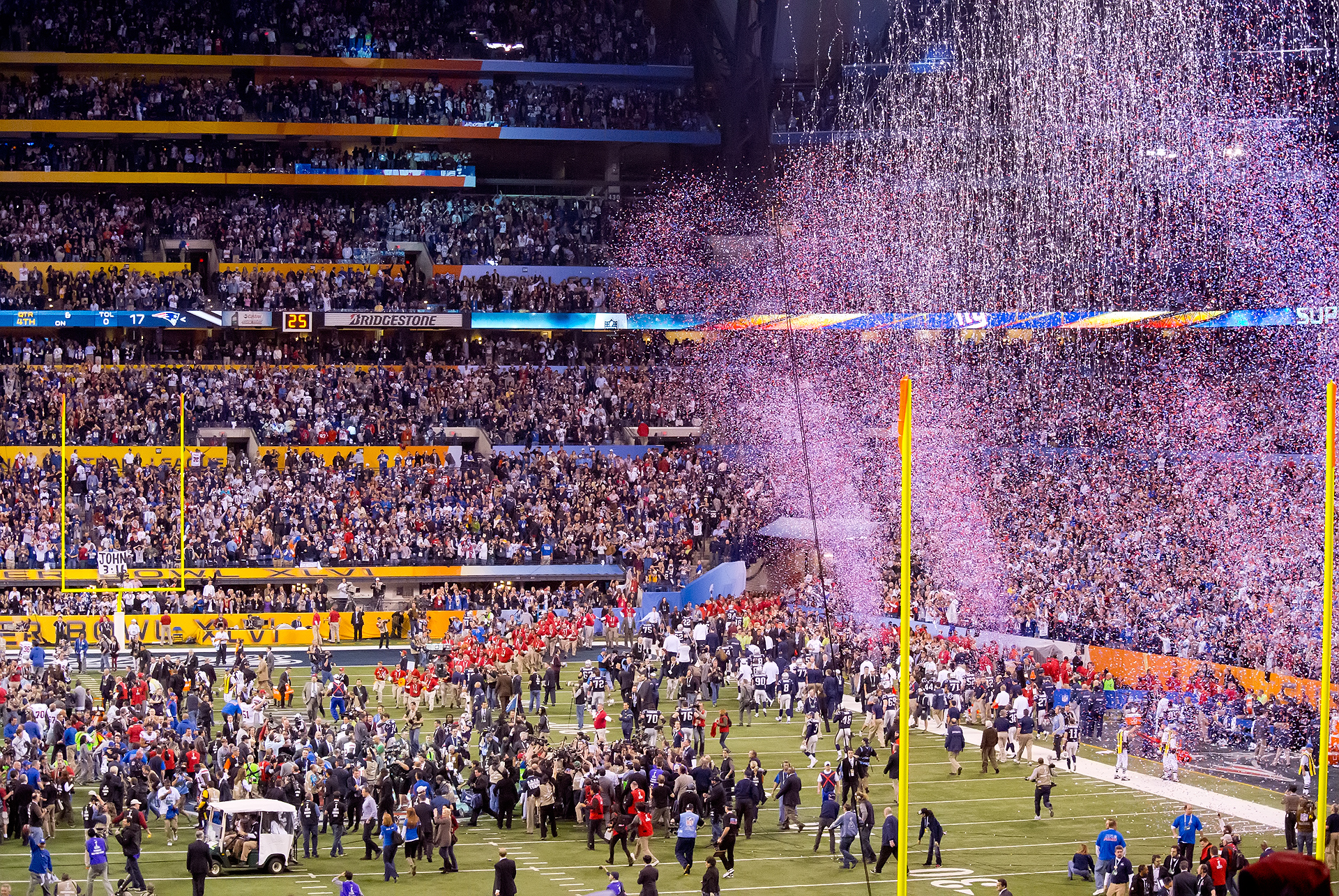
Super Bowl XLVI post-game celebrations in 2012

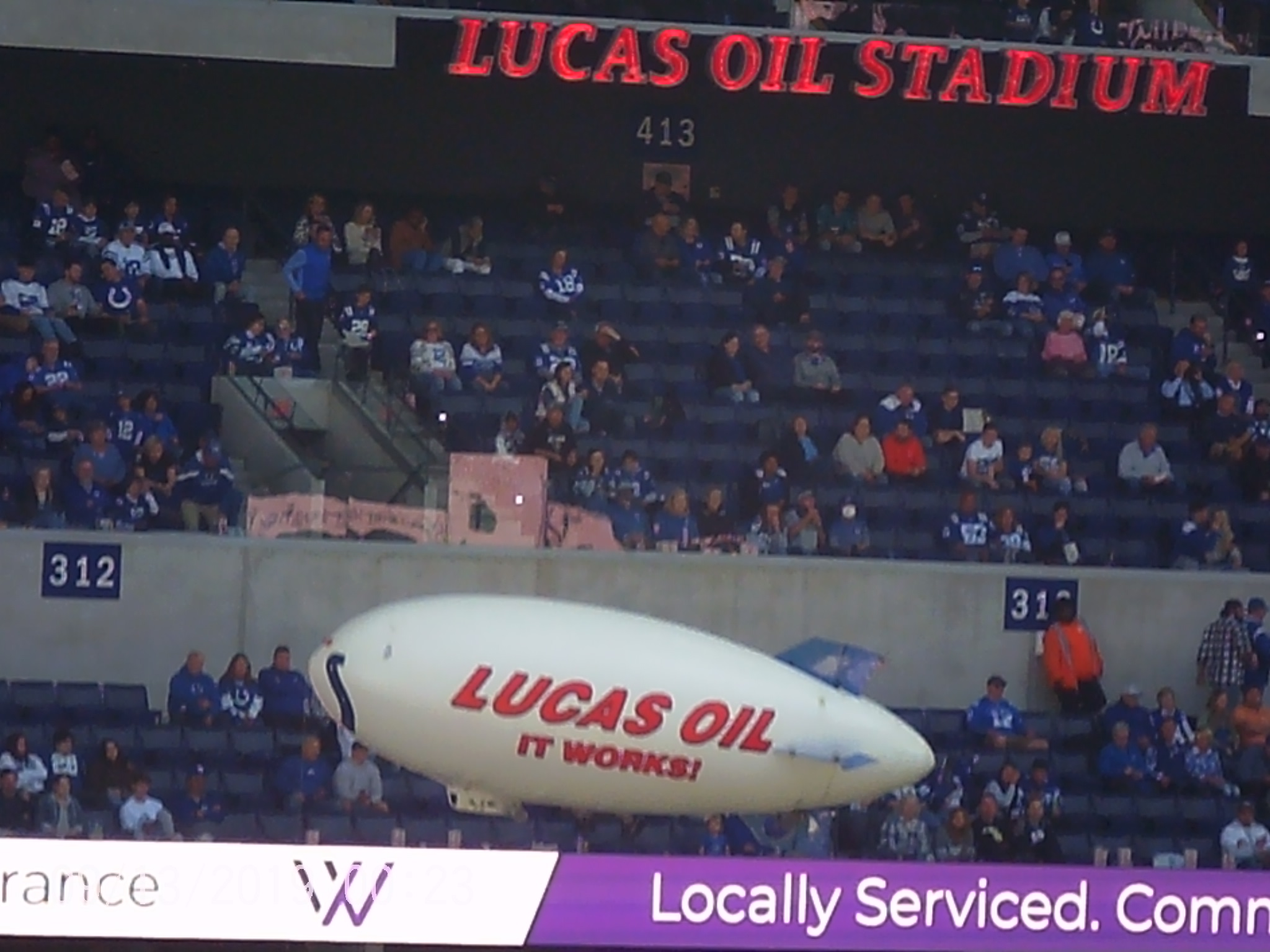
The Lucas Oil Blimp inside the stadium in 2022

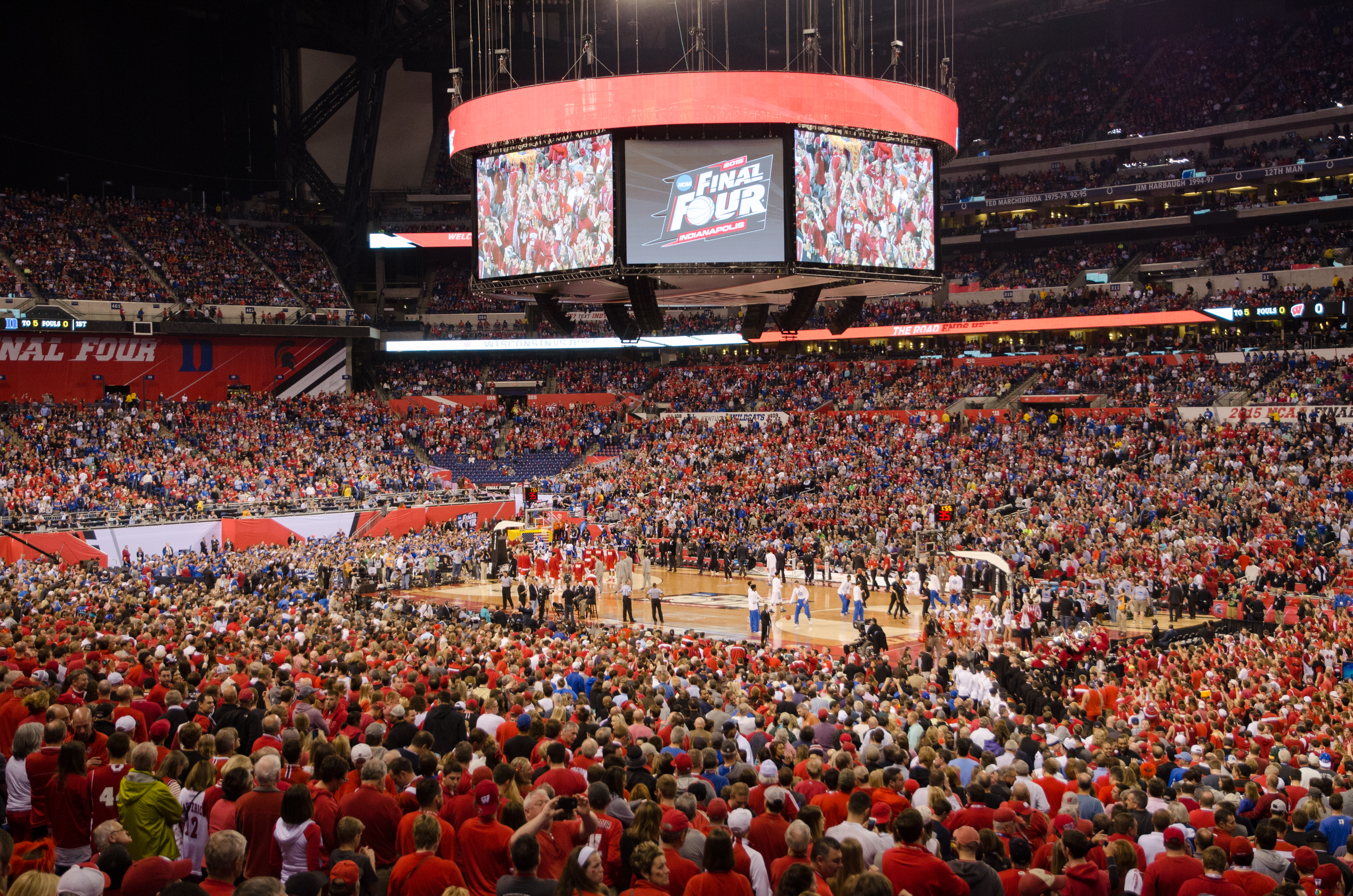
Lucas Oil Stadium configured to host the 2015 NCAA Men's Basketball Final Four

Annual events include:

- Bands of America Grand National Championships and Indianapolis Super Regionals
- Big Ten Football Championship Game
- Circle City Classic
- Drum Corps International World Championships
- FDIC International (Firefighting Convention)
- IHSAA Indiana State Football Championships
- ISSMA Marching Band State Finals
- Monster Energy AMA Supercross
- Monster Jam
- NFL Draft Combine
- National FFA Convention

Upcoming and/or current events include:

- Monster Jam World Finals XXVI (July 1–3, 2027)
- NCAA Men's Basketball Final Four (April 2029)

Significant past events included:

- Super Bowl XLVI (February 5, 2012)
- Kenny Chesney concerts (2008, 2009, 2012, 2015)
- Chelsea vs. Inter Milan (International Champions Cup) (August 1, 2013)
- NCAA Men's Basketball Final Four (2010, 2015, 2021, 2026)
- NCAA Men's Basketball Midwest Regional Semifinals and Final (2009, 2013, 2014, 2025)
- One Direction – On The Road Again Tour (July 31, 2015)
- Gen Con 50 (August 2017)
- North American Youth Congress 2017 (July–August 2017)
- U2 – The Joshua Tree Tour 2017 (September 10, 2017)
- Taylor Swift's Reputation Stadium Tour (September 15, 2018)
- 2021 Big Ten men's basketball tournament (March 10–14, 2021)
- NCAA men's basketball tournament, including the Final Four (March–April 2021)
- Guns N' Roses – Guns N' Roses 2020 Tour (September 8, 2021)
- College Football Playoff National Championship (January 10, 2022)
- 2024 United States Olympic Trials, Swimming (June 15–23, 2024)
- 10th National Eucharistic Congress (United States) (July 17–21, 2024)
- Taylor Swift – The Eras Tour (November 1–3, 2024)
- Royal Rumble (2025) (February 1, 2025)
- North American Youth Congress 2025 (July 23–25, 2025)

=== Football ===
The first games played at Lucas Oil Stadium occurred on August 22, 2008, and were part of the PeyBack Classic, featuring Indiana high school football games between Noblesville High School and Fishers High School in Game 1, followed by New Palestine High School and Whiteland Community High School in Game 2.

The first Colts game at the stadium was a preseason game against the Buffalo Bills on August 24, 2008, which ended in a 20–7 loss. The Colts faced the Chicago Bears in a rematch of Super Bowl XLI in their first regular season game in the stadium on September 7, 2008, which ended in a 29–13 defeat.

=== Soccer ===
The stadium hosted its first soccer game on August 1, 2013, when Chelsea played Inter Milan in a first-round game of the International Champions Cup, drawing 41,983 fans.

Date	Winning Team	Result	Losing Team	Tournament	Spectators
August 1, 2013	(England) Chelsea	2–0	(Italy) Inter Milan	2013 International Champions Cup First Round	41,983

From 2018 to 2020, Lucas Oil Stadium served as the home field of the United Soccer League's Indy Eleven, replacing the venue the team used while in the North American Soccer League, Carroll Stadium.

=== Basketball ===
In March 2021, various rounds of the 2021 NCAA Division I men's basketball tournament were moved to Lucas Oil Stadium as part of the NCAA's decision to consolidate the tournament into sites in Indiana as it could not be held across the United States due to the COVID-19 pandemic. Lucas Oil Stadium hosted games in all rounds (except the "First Four"), including the Final Four and championship game. Lucas Oil Stadium hosted the men's Final Four again in 2026.

Lucas Oil Stadium hosted the Saturday night events of the 2024 NBA All-Star Weekend; the All-Star Game proper was hosted by Gainbridge Fieldhouse.

=== Swimming ===
In 2024, Lucas Oil Stadium hosted the USA Swimming Olympic trials. The crowd of 20,689 was the largest gathering ever for an indoor swim meet. The success of the event led USA Swimming to announce a return to the stadium for the 2028 trials.

=== Professional wrestling ===
Lucas Oil Stadium hosted the 2025 Royal Rumble, and will host a future SummerSlam and WrestleMania.

=== Marching arts ===
On August 9, 2006, Drum Corps International (DCI) announced that it would move its corporate offices to Indianapolis and that the DCI World Championships would be held at Lucas Oil Stadium every year through 2018, beginning in 2008 as the stadium's inaugural event. However, due to construction delays, DCI was forced to move its 2008 World Championships to Memorial Stadium, in Bloomington for that year. The competition was held for the first time at Lucas Oil Stadium in 2009, and has been hosted there every year since, with the exception of 2020 and 2021, due to the COVID-19 pandemic. (DCI used Lucas Oil Stadium for a non-judged "DCI Celebration" in 2021.) In 2015, Drum Corps International and the city of Indianapolis announced a 10-year contract extension, allowing the World Championships to continue through 2028.

Lucas Oil Stadium is also host to the Bands of America Grand National Championships and the Indiana Marching Band State Finals.

=== Concerts ===
In addition to its role as a sports venue, Lucas Oil Stadium regularly hosts major concerts and entertainment events.

Date	Artist	Opening Act(s)	Tour / Concert Name	Attendance	Revenue	Notes
September 13, 2008	Kenny Chesney	Keith Urban; LeAnn Rimes; Gary Allan; Luke Bryan; Sammy Hagar	The Poets and Pirates Tour	50,528 / 50,528	$3,835,609	The stadium's first public concert.
September 19, 2009	Kenny Chesney	Miranda Lambert; Sugarland; Montgomery Gentry; Zac Brown Band	Sun City Carnival Tour	45,178 / 45,178	$3,016,365	
February 5, 2012	Madonna			Super Bowl XLVI halftime show		
July 28, 2012	Kenny Chesney; Tim McGraw	Grace Potter and the Nocturnals; Jake Owen	Brothers of the Sun Tour	41,671 / 43,864	$3,509,151	
May 9, 2015	Kenny Chesney; Eric Church	Brantley Gilbert; Chase Rice; Old Dominion	The Big Revival Tour	43,675 / 44,872	$4,064,335	
July 31, 2015	One Direction	Icona Pop	On the Road Again Tour	42,196 / 42,196	$3,426,589	
September 10, 2017	U2	Beck	The Joshua Tree Tour 2017	51,731 / 51,731	$5,970,055	
September 15, 2018	Taylor Swift	Camila Cabello; Charli XCX	Taylor Swift's Reputation Stadium Tour	55,729 / 55,729	$6,531,245	Second-highest attended concert at the stadium.
September 8, 2021	Guns N' Roses	Mammoth WVH	Guns N' Roses 2020 Tour			
August 16, 2022	Mötley Crüe; Def Leppard	Poison; Joan Jett; Classless Act	The Stadium Tour	-	-	An intoxicated fan was hospitalized after falling from a balcony during Mötley Crüe's set.
September 9, 2022	John Mellencamp	Buddy Guy John Hiatt				
April 4, 2024	Morgan Wallen	Bailey Zimmerman; Nate Smith; Lauren Watkins	One Night At a Time World Tour			
April 5, 2024	Morgan Wallen	Bailey Zimmerman; Nate Smith; Lauren Watkins	One Night At a Time World Tour			
October 12, 2024	Pink	Sheryl Crow; KidCutUp; The Script	P!NK: Summer Carnival			
November 1, 2024	Taylor Swift	Gracie Abrams	The Eras Tour	-	-	New high attendance record set at every show. Swift is the first act to perform three shows at the stadium on a single tour. November 3 was also the final Eras Tour show in the United States.
November 2, 2024	Taylor Swift	Gracie Abrams	The Eras Tour	-	-	New high attendance record set at every show. Swift is the first act to perform three shows at the stadium on a single tour. November 3 was also the final Eras Tour show in the United States.
November 3, 2024	Taylor Swift	Gracie Abrams	The Eras Tour	-	-	New high attendance record set at every show. Swift is the first act to perform three shows at the stadium on a single tour. November 3 was also the final Eras Tour show in the United States.
May 8, 2026	Morgan Wallen	Brooks & Dunn; Hudson Westbrook; Zach John King	Still The Problem Tour			
May 9, 2026	Morgan Wallen	Ella Langley; Flatland Cavalry; Zach John King	Still The Problem Tour			
June 12, 2026	Post Malone	Jelly Roll; Carter Faith	Big Ass Stadium Tour			
September 9, 2026	Bruno Mars	DJ Pee .Wee; Raye	The Romantic Tour			
October 10, 2026	Ed Sheeran	All opening artists declined to perform in Indianapolis	Loop Tour			Macklemore was removed as an opening act when Lucas Oil Stadium and other venues would not allow him to perform after his criticism of Israel's genocide in Palestine.
May 1, 2027	Zach Bryan	John Fogerty; Fey Fili	Young Manhood and Other Donatable Organs Tour			
June 5, 2027	Metallica	Limp Bizkit; Avatar	M72 World Tour			

== Financing ==
The total cost of Lucas Oil Stadium was $720 million. The stadium is being financed with funds raised by the State of Indiana and the City of Indianapolis, with the Indianapolis Colts providing $100 million. Marion County has raised taxes for food and beverage sales, auto rental taxes, innkeeper's taxes, and admission taxes for its share of the costs. Meanwhile, there has been an increase in food and beverage taxes in the eight surrounding doughnut counties (with the exception of Morgan County) and the sale of Colts license plates.

The County Commissioners of each county voted whether to levy the 1% food and beverage tax proposed by Marion County. Under the agreement, half of the revenue from the tax would stay in the respective county. Morgan County was the only county to turn down the offer, yet in a later vote, it levied its own 1% tax – thus keeping all of its additional generated revenue.

=== Budget shortfall ===
In August 2006, the Capital Improvement Board, which operates the stadium, estimated that operating expenses of the new stadium would be $10 million more per year than the RCA Dome. The board urged the Indiana General Assembly to authorize funding to cover the shortfall. The Indiana Legislature considered a bill to raise sales taxes statewide to cover the shortfall; however, this plan faced stiff opposition from legislators outside the Indianapolis metro area.

The assembly ultimately authorized a tax increase in Indianapolis-Marion County. In addition, the CIB trimmed staff and cut $10 million from its budget. Still, the agency anticipated a $20 million operating deficit for Lucas Oil Stadium in 2009. Anticipated expenses were $27.7 million—far outstripping the $7.7 million CIB expected to collect from its share of revenue from stadium events. The Colts organization has been criticized for the favorable lease terms and the high percentage of revenue it can keep under the terms of its agreements with the stadium authorities and there have been calls for the team to cover the shortfalls of the CIB. The Colts responded to these criticisms in an open letter to fans on September 16, 2009.

== Incidents ==
On September 8, 2013, after the Colts defeated the Oakland Raiders in the season opener, a rail over the opposing team tunnel collapsed, injuring two fans. One fan was transferred to the hospital for evaluation. No serious injuries were reported.

On September 3, 2015, three fans were injured by a bolt that fell from the roof of the stadium as it was being opened during an NFL preseason game against the Cincinnati Bengals. The stadium was pronounced safe by officials, though the roof remained closed for several weeks until an investigation into the fault was completed.

== Construction pictures ==
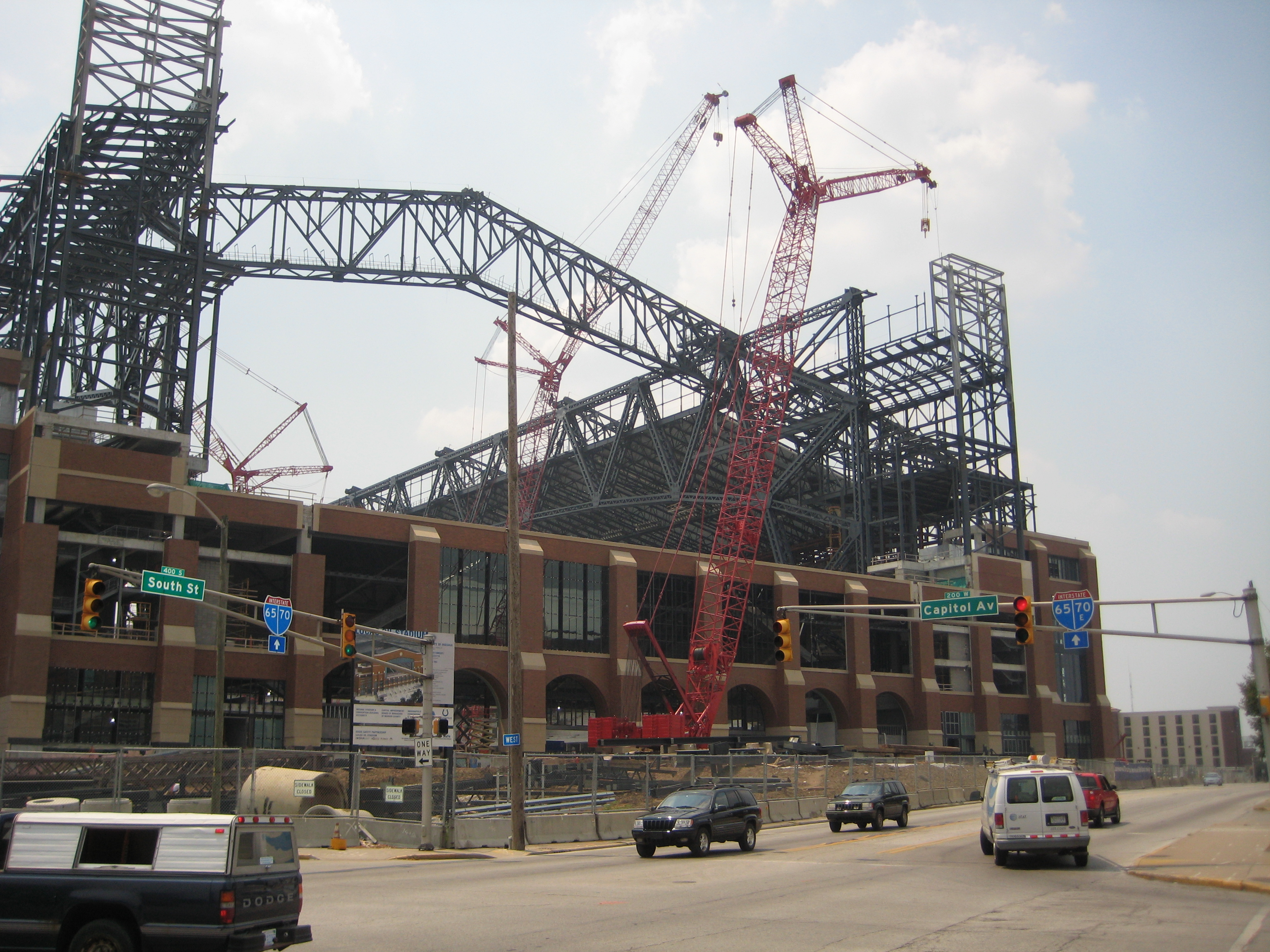
Early phases of construction

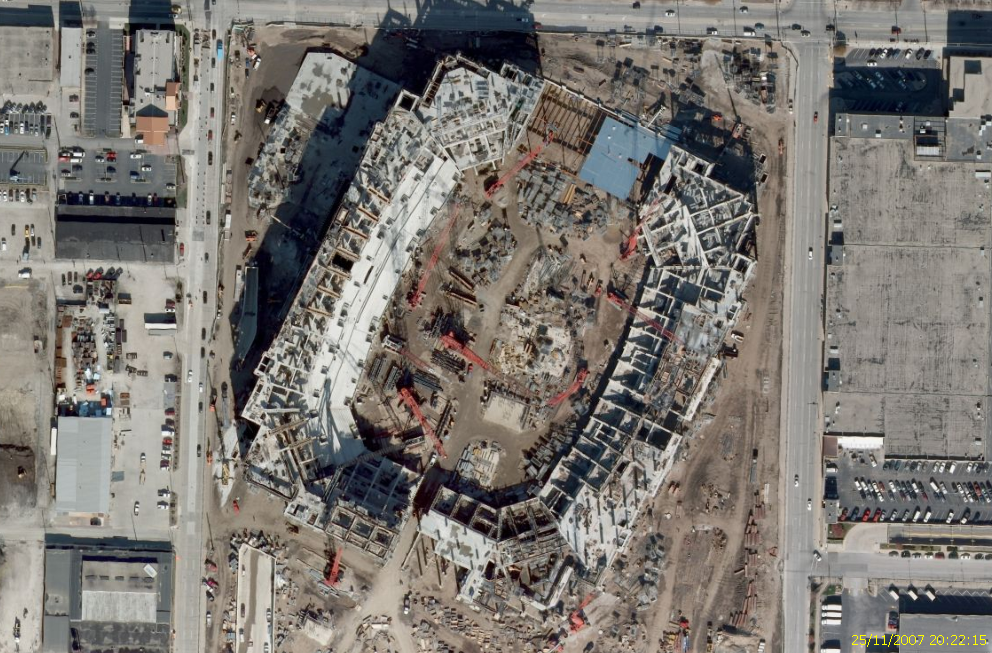
Satellite image

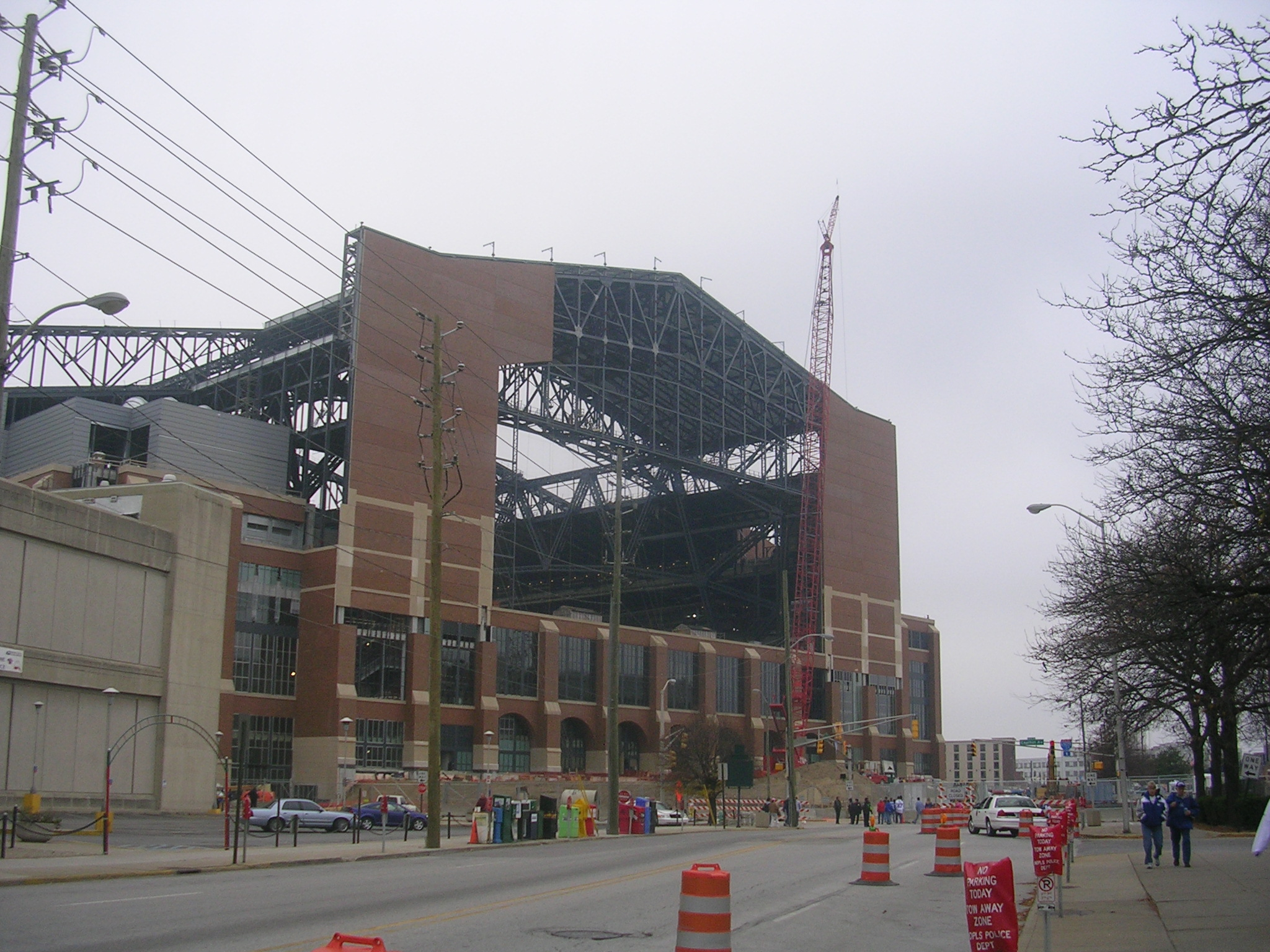
Mid-stage of construction

== See also ==
- List of current National Football League stadiums
- List of American football stadiums by capacity
- List of music venues in the United States
- List of attractions and events in Indianapolis
- List of tallest buildings in Indianapolis § Other structures
- List of tallest buildings in Indiana
- History of the Indianapolis Colts
- Statue of Peyton Manning

Events and tenants
Preceded by RCA Dome	Home of the Indianapolis Colts; 2008–present	Succeeded by current
Preceded by Carroll Stadium	Home of the Indy Eleven; 2018–present	Succeeded by current
Preceded by Cowboys Stadium	Host of Super Bowl XLVI; 2012	Succeeded by Mercedes-Benz Superdome
Preceded by Ford Field; AT&T Stadium; U.S. Bank Stadium; Alamodome	NCAA Men's Division I Basketball Tournament; Finals Venue; 2010; 2015; 2021; 2026	Succeeded by Reliant Stadium; NRG Stadium; Mercedes-Benz Superdome; Ford Field
Preceded by Amalie Arena	NCAA Women's Division I Basketball Tournament; Finals Venue; 2016	Succeeded by American Airlines Center
Preceded by first stadium	Host of the Big Ten Championship Game; 2011–present	Succeeded by current
Preceded by RCA Dome	Home of Bands of America; Grand National Championship; 2008–present	Succeeded by current
Preceded by Memorial Stadium, Bloomington	Home of the Drum Corps International; World Championship; 2009–2028	Succeeded by current
Preceded by RCA Dome	Home of the NFL Scouting Combine; 2009–present	Succeeded by current
Preceded by Heinz Field	Host of AFC Championship Game; 2010	Succeeded by Heinz Field
