= 1867 Franklin, Indiana lynchings =

On October 31, 1867, a mob broke into the Johnson County jail in Franklin, Indiana and lynched John Patterson and Henry Hatchell. The two men were awaiting trial for the murder of David J. Lyons of Greenwood, Indiana.

== Background ==
John Patterson and Henry Hatchel were living near Greenwood, Indiana. The two were known to be part of a larger group of thieves who had gained notoriety in the area for stealing money and farming equipment. On August 12, 1867, David J. Lyons of Greenwood, was robbed and fatally shot. John Patterson, Henry Hatchell, David Johnson (reportedly a pseudonym and also spelled Johnsen) and William Simmons were among others who were indicted for the crimes. John Patterson escaped jail, but was found and apprehended in Boyle County, Kentucky. John Patterson was subsequently returned to the Johnson County Jail where he was to remain in jail until his trial.

== Lynching ==
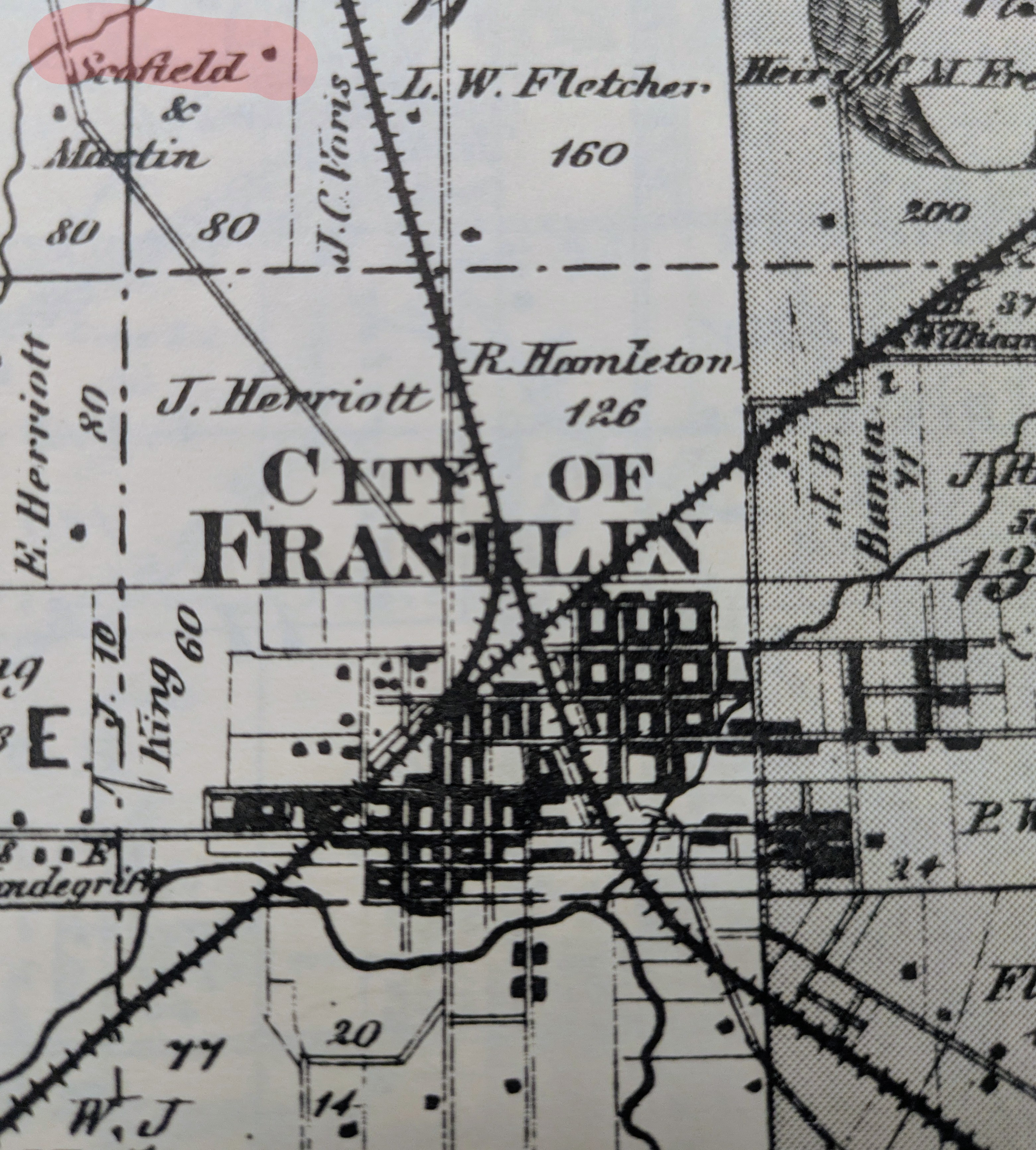
The highlighted area in the upper right shows the 80-acre Scofield property, reported to be the site of the lynching of Hatchell and Patterson. This image is a reproduction of an 1866 map of Franklin Township in Johnson County, Indiana

Frustrations began to mount due to the length of the trail and fear that the courts would fail to reach justice. The Greenwood residents familiar with the circumstances began contemplating revenge. After 11 pm on the night of October 31, 1867, a mob broke into the Johnson County jail with a sledgehammer. Many Franklin residents and authorities tried unsuccessfully to dissuade the mob, reported to be around 400 people. The mob succeeded in removing Hatchell and Patterson from the jail. Hatchell momentarily escaped, but was reportedly shot in the leg and quickly recaptured.

The mob brought Patterson and Hatchell to an area north of town known at the time as Schoffield's (also spelled Scofield) woods. The men were tied up with cords and hung until their death.

== Aftermath ==
The bodies were left behind by the mob and reportedly large numbers of people visited the scene marked by handwritten signs. An article in the November 7, 1867, newspaper, the Franklin Democrat, provided a detailed description of the events and condemned the violence. The lynchings were also reported in Chicago, New York, Cincinnati and many other newspapers. Some of those alleged to be involved in these crimes were brought to trial in November 1867, but no one was ever convicted.

An article published in 1883 asserts that Bob and Eli Johnson (Johnsen) were later convicted for their involvement in the murder of David J. Lyons (August 1867 robbery victim) and sentenced to prison.

As a result of this incident, county officials deemed the Johnson County Jail unfit and construction of a new jail building began shortly afterwards.

	Timeline and locations of incidents
Dates of incident:	October 31, 1867 - November 1, 1867
Timeline and locations of incidents: (GPS coordinates approximate)	11:00 - 11:30 pm on October 31, 1867 - Johnson Couty Jail breached (39°28′48.82″N 86°03′18.26″W) Time Unknown - Victims brought to Scoffield Woods along state road (39°29′23.28″N 86°03′32.76″W) Time Unknown - Henry Hatchell attempts to flee and is shot and wounded Time Unknown - Two victims died of hanging (39°29′33.72″N 86°03′41.76″W)
