= Clark Township =

Clark Township may refer to:

== Arkansas ==
- Clark Township, Clay County, Arkansas, in Clay County, Arkansas
- Clark Township, Greene County, Arkansas, in Greene County, Arkansas
- Clark Township, Logan County, Arkansas, in Logan County, Arkansas
- Clark Township, Pike County, Arkansas, in Pike County, Arkansas
- Clark Township, Pope County, Arkansas

== Indiana ==
- Clark Township, Johnson County, Indiana
- Clark Township, Montgomery County, Indiana
- Clark Township, Perry County, Indiana

== Iowa ==
- Clark Township, Tama County, Iowa

== Kansas ==
- Clark Township, Marion County, Kansas

== Michigan ==
- Clark Township, Michigan

== Minnesota ==
- Clark Township, Aitkin County, Minnesota
- Clark Township, Faribault County, Minnesota

== Missouri ==
- Clark Township, Atchison County, Missouri
- Clark Township, Chariton County, Missouri
- Clark Township, Cole County, Missouri
- Clark Township, Lincoln County, Missouri

== Nebraska ==
- Clark Township, Dixon County, Nebraska

== New Jersey ==
- Clark Township, New Jersey

== North Dakota ==
- Clark Township, Hettinger County, North Dakota, in Hettinger County, North Dakota

== Ohio ==
- Clark Township, Brown County, Ohio
- Clark Township, Clinton County, Ohio
- Clark Township, Coshocton County, Ohio
- Clark Township, Holmes County, Ohio

== South Dakota ==
- Clark Township, Douglas County, South Dakota, in Douglas County, South Dakota
- Clark Township, Faulk County, South Dakota, in Faulk County, South Dakota
- Clark Township, Perkins County, South Dakota
