= Heck-Hasler House =

Historic house in Indiana, United States

- U.S. National Register of Historic Places
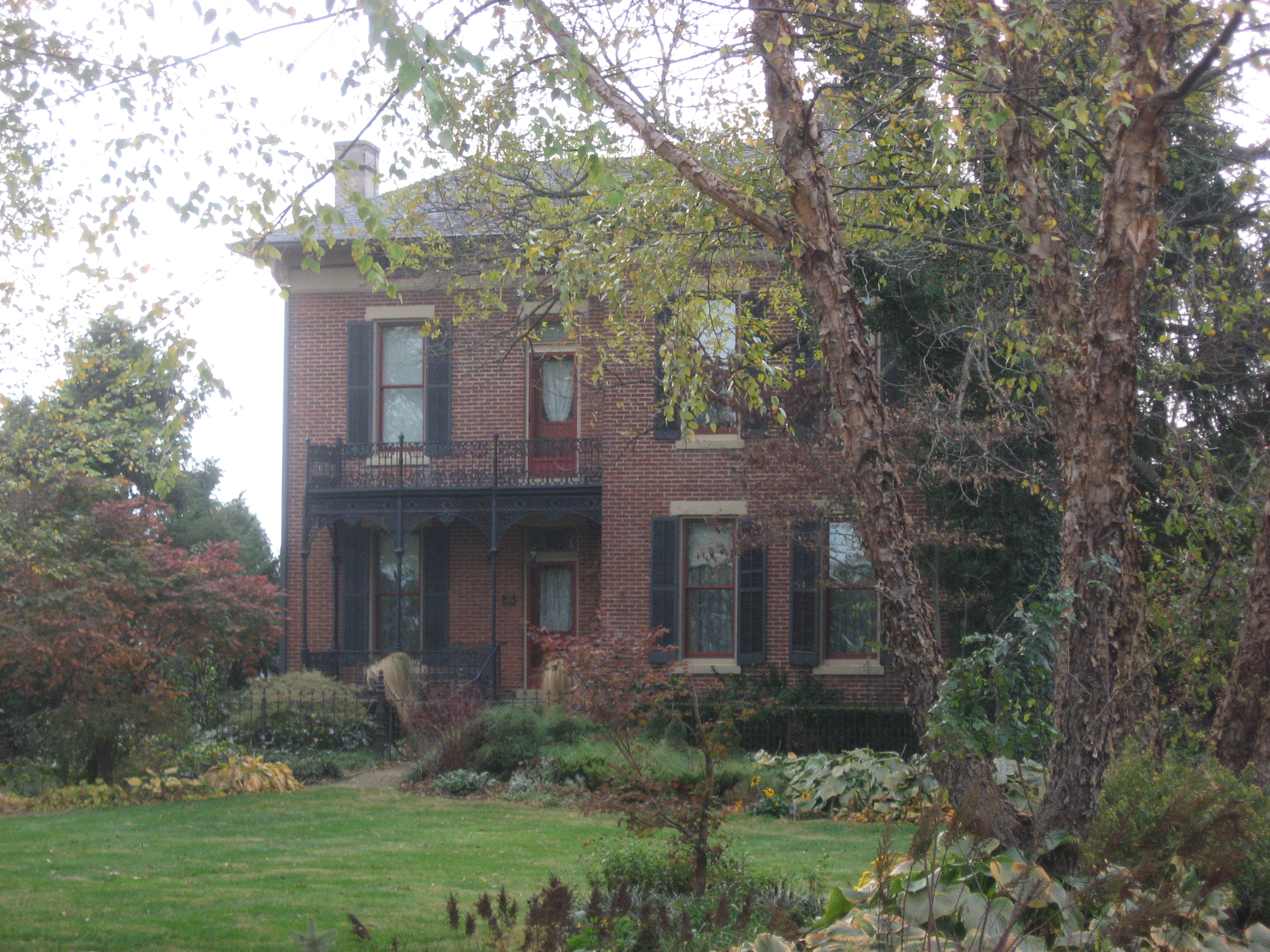
- Heck-Hasler House, October 2010

- Location within Indiana Location within the United States
- Location: 6612 N. 575E, Clark Township, Johnson County, Indiana
- Coordinates: 39°34′23″N 86°41′9″W
- Area: 3 acres (1.2 ha)
- Built: c. 1868
- Architectural style: Italianate
- NRHP reference No.: 00000204
- Added to NRHP: March 15, 2000

Heck-Hasler House is a historic home located in Clark Township, Johnson County, Indiana. Built in 1868, Heck-Hasler House is a two-story, "T"-plan, Italianate style brick dwelling on a limestone block foundation. It features a one-story cast iron front porch with decorative colonettes and lattice work. Also on the property are the contributing smokehouse, summer kitchen, and milk house.

It was listed on the National Register of Historic Places in 2000.
