= Access Johnson County =

Provider of mass transportation in Johnson County, Indiana

- Founded: 1999
- Locale: Franklin and Greenwood, Indiana
- Service area: Johnson County, Indiana
- Service type: Bus service, paratransit
- Routes: 6
- Fleet: 8 buses
- Annual ridership: 111,612 (2019)
- Website: Access Johnson County

Access Johnson County is the primary provider of mass transportation in Johnson County, Indiana, with six routes serving Franklin and Greenwood. As of 2019, the system provided 111,612 rides over 58,861 annual vehicle revenue hours with 8 buses and 18 paratransit vehicles.

== History ==
Access Johnson County was formed in 1999, the first transit agency to serve a suburban county around Indianapolis. As of 2022, Greenwood was exploring options for expanding transit services to major employers in the area. Potential options included extending the Red Line to Franklin, adding Saturday service to Access Johnson County, or implementing a workforce shuttle.

== Service ==
Access Johnson County operates six weekday bus routes in Johnson County. Two local routes operate within Franklin and Greenwood each, with an additional two routes traveling between Franklin and Greenwood, known as Zip North and Zip South. Hours of operation for the system are Monday through Friday from 6:15 A.M. to 4:45 P.M. There is no service on Saturdays and Sundays. Regular fares are $1.00 for local routes, and $2.00 for Zip routes. Riders can transfer to IndyGo at the Greenwood Park Mall.

=== Routes ===
- Franklin East
- Franklin West
- Greenwood East
- Greenwood West
- Zip North
- Zip South

== Fixed route ridership ==
The ridership statistics shown here are of fixed route services only and do not include demand response services.

== See also ==
- List of bus transit systems in the United States
- IndyGo
