= Guilford M. Wiley =

American politician

Guilford Mitchell Wiley was a member of the Wisconsin State Assembly.

== Biography ==
Wiley was born on July 10, 1880, in Whiteland, Indiana. He attended Franklin College, Indiana University Bloomington and DePauw University, where he graduated with a Bachelor of Arts in 1906. From 1921 to 1926, he was principal of La Crosse Central High School. Additionally, Wiley was a math and economics teacher and was a baseball and basketball coach. A resident of Galesville, Wisconsin, he died on May 2, 1955.

== Political career ==
Wiley was a member of the Assembly during the 1947 and 1949 sessions. Previously, he had been a superintendent of schools. In 1952, he was a candidate for Lieutenant Governor of Wisconsin. He was a Republican.
