= Indiana Marching Band State Finals =

The Indiana Marching Band State Finals is a competition for marching bands governed by the Indiana State School Music Association (ISSMA). ISSMA has sanctioned the event annually since 1981; from 1973 until 1980 the top bands from the NISBOVA and ISSMA circuits met in the All-State Marching Band Contest.

== Format ==
Bands are split into four classes—A, B, C, and D—determined by the size of the school the band represents, though bands are permitted to participate in the class immediately larger than the one they would otherwise be assigned to if they wish.

Prior to 1983, bands were assigned to one of seven District sites around the state. Bands receiving a Division I rating at their District advanced to State Preliminaries for their class, and the top five bands from each class preliminary performed in that class's State Finals the same evening. Beginning in 1983, State Preliminaries was removed, and instead bands receiving a Division I rating at District competition advanced to, depending on their geographic location, either the North Regional or South Regional for their class, two weeks after District. The top five bands from each regional in each class then advanced to State Finals the following week, resulting in ten bands per class at Finals. Numerical division ratings were replaced with Gold/Silver/Bronze/Participation ratings in 2004, but otherwise the format remained essentially unchanged through 2007.

Beginning in 2008, the top ten bands from each class at each Regional site will advance to a new Semi-State round of competition, held the week immediately following Regionals (historically the week that State Finals has been held). Of the twenty bands in each class at Semi-State, the top ten will then advance to State Finals the following week.

== Scheduling ==
From 1983 through 2007, State Finals was typically scheduled for either the seventh or eighth Saturday after Labor Day (depending on how early in September Labor Day fell), with Regionals being the Saturday prior and District two or three Saturdays before Regionals. An open weekend was allotted between District and Regionals should a change of date for District be necessitated by inclement weather (should it not be needed, it was typically filled with unsanctioned invitational competitions); however, no such weekend was allotted between Regionals and State Finals due to the difficulty of securing venues for the final two stages of competition. The weekends prior to District, generally beginning with the first Saturday after Labor Day, were used for various unsanctioned invitational competitions organized by high schools and, occasionally, colleges or other independent organizations.

Beginning in 2008, State Finals was pushed back to the first Saturday in November, on the ninth Saturday after Labor Day. The move was necessitated by the decision of the administrators of the Indiana Convention Center (directly adjacent to the brand-new Lucas Oil Stadium that would be used by the Marching Band State Finals) to schedule the Future Farmers of America National Convention on the weekend that had historically been used for State Finals. To create a truer top ten bands from around the state, ISSMA created the semi-state round. Previously, it was merely the top five from each of the regions. The schedule up to and including Regionals weekend remains the same.
