= Greenwood station (Indiana) =

Railway station in the United States

Greenwood

General information
- Location: 211 South Madison Avenue; Greenwood, Indiana
- Coordinates: 39.6134°N 86.1095°W

History
- Opened: January 1900
- Closed: September 8, 1941
- Rebuilt: c. 1915

Services
Preceding station	Interstate Public Service	Following station
Stop 15 toward Indianapolis	Main Line	Stop 17 toward Louisville
- Office of the Interstate Public Service Company and Interurban station
- U.S. Historic district – Contributing property
- Part of: Greenwood Commercial Historic District (ID91000792)
- Designated CP: June 14, 1991
Location

Greenwood station is a former interurban railway station in Greenwood, Indiana. It is located at 211 South Madison Avenue — the tracks formerly ran embedded in the roadway. The Indianapolis, Greenwood, and Franklin Railroad completed their line between Indianapolis and Greenwood on January 1, 1900, with full service beginning in the following weeks. The station building was constructed around 1915 and housed successor company Interstate Public Service's offices. Rail service ended after September 8, 1941.

The station building was deemed a contributing property of the Greenwood Commercial Historic District when it was listed on the National Register of Historic Places in 1991.
