= Greenwood Commercial Historic District =

Historic district in Indiana, United States

- U.S. National Register of Historic Places
- U.S. Historic district
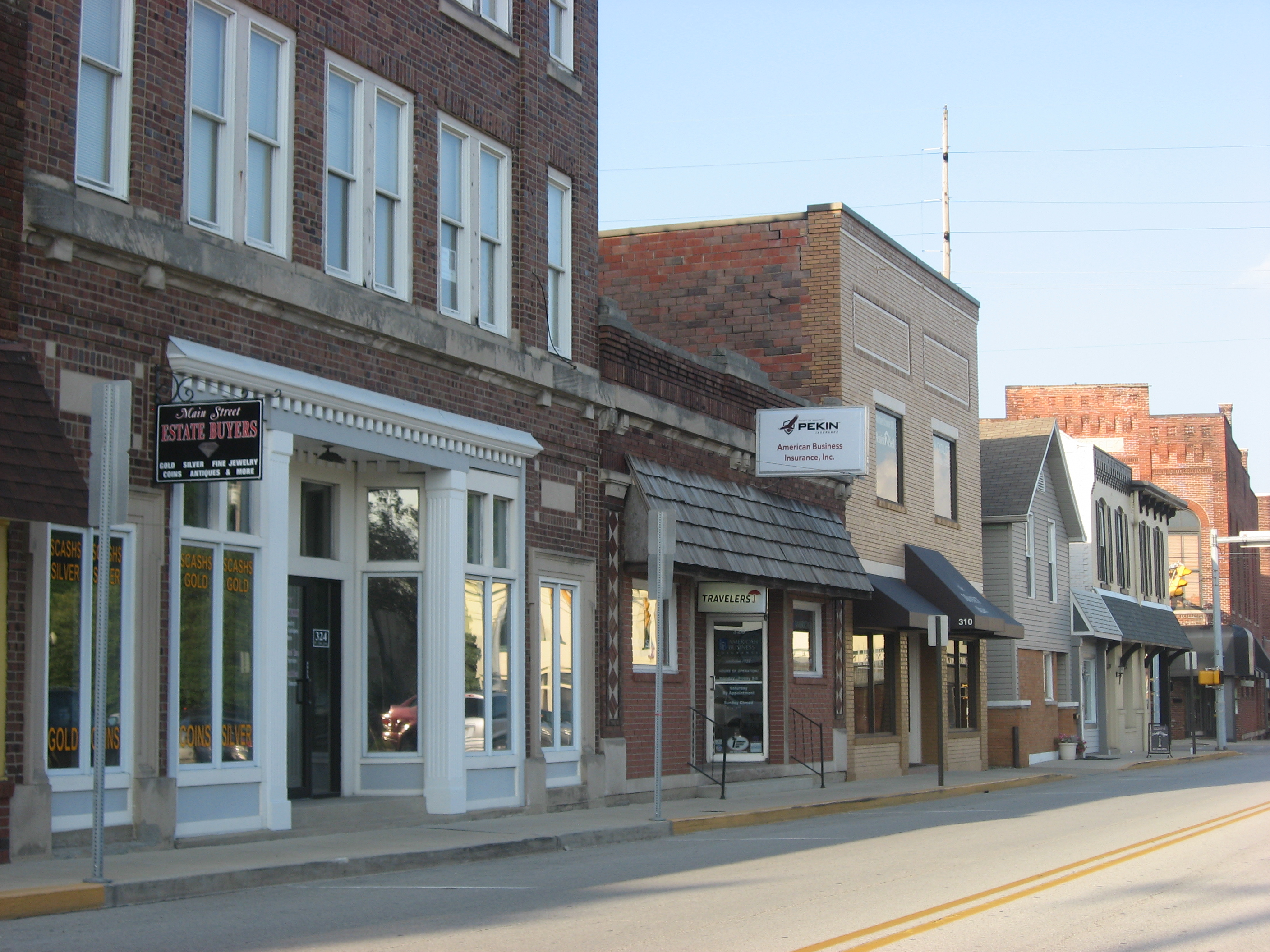
- Greenwood Commercial Historic District, July 2010

- Location within Indiana Location within the United States
- Location: 172-332 W. Main St. and 147-211 S. Madison Ave., Greenwood, Indiana
- Coordinates: 39°36′50″N 86°6′35″W
- Area: 3.2 acres (1.3 ha)
- Architectural style: Classical Revival, Italianate, Romanesque
- NRHP reference No.: 91000792
- Added to NRHP: June 14, 1991

Greenwood Commercial Historic District is a national historic district located at Greenwood, Indiana. The district encompasses 25 contributing buildings in the central business district of Greenwood. It developed between about 1860 and 1935, and includes notable examples of Italianate, Romanesque, and Classical Revival style architecture. Notable buildings include the Grafton Peek Building (1887), former Odd Fellows Hall (c. 1905), former Masonic Lodge (1909), G.W. Clemmons Block (1906), and the Interurban Public Service Company and Interurban Station (c. 1915).

It was listed on the National Register of Historic Places in 1991.
