= Clark Township, Lincoln County, Missouri =

Township in Lincoln County, Missouri, United States

Clark Township
- Inactive Township
- Interactive map of Clark Township
- Coordinates: 38.9142868°N 90.9793613°W
- Country: United States
- State: Missouri
- County: Lincoln
- Established: 1826
- Named for: Christopher Clark
- Time zone: UTC−6 (Central (CST))
  - Summer (DST): UTC−5 (CDT)

Clark Township is an inactive township in Lincoln County, in the U.S. state of Missouri.

Clark Township was established in 1826, and named after Christopher Clark, a first settler.
