= Whiteland, Indiana =

- Town
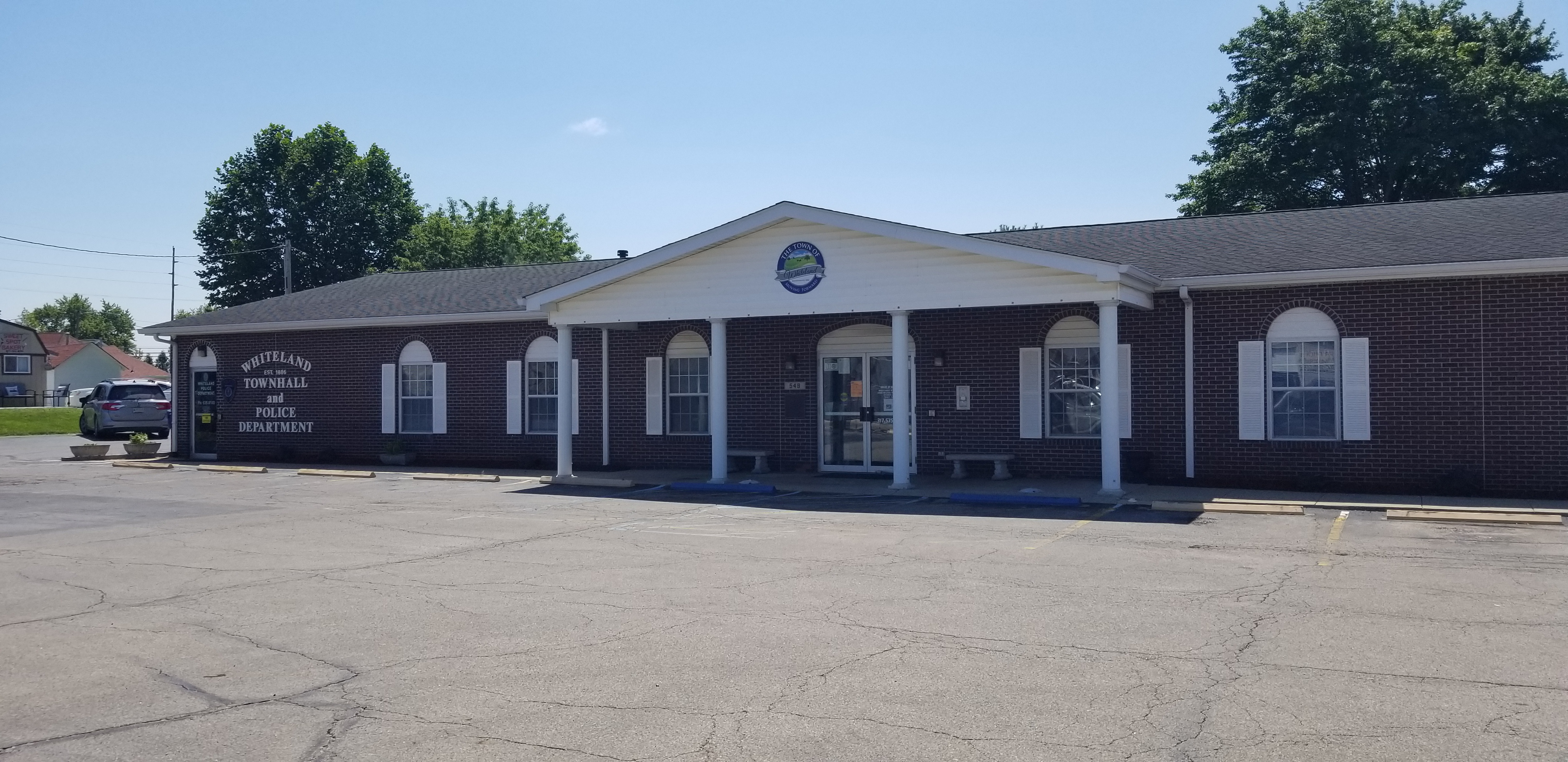

- Flag Logo
- Motto: "A Place to Call Home."
- Location of Whiteland in Johnson County, Indiana
- Coordinates: 39°32′41″N 86°05′38″W
- Country: United States
- State: Indiana
- County: Johnson
- Townships: Pleasant, Franklin, Clark
- Established: 1863
- Incorporated: 1886

Area
  - Total: 5.49 sq mi (14.21 km^{2})
  - Land: 5.47 sq mi (14.17 km^{2})
  - Water: 0.015 sq mi (0.04 km^{2})
- Elevation: 794 ft (242 m)

Population (2020)
  - Total: 4,599
  - Density: 840.5/sq mi (324.53/km^{2})
- Time zone: UTC-5 (Eastern (EST))
  - Summer (DST): UTC-4 (EDT)
- ZIP code: 46184
- Area code: 317
- FIPS code: 18-83816
- GNIS feature ID: 2397740
- Website: townofwhiteland.com

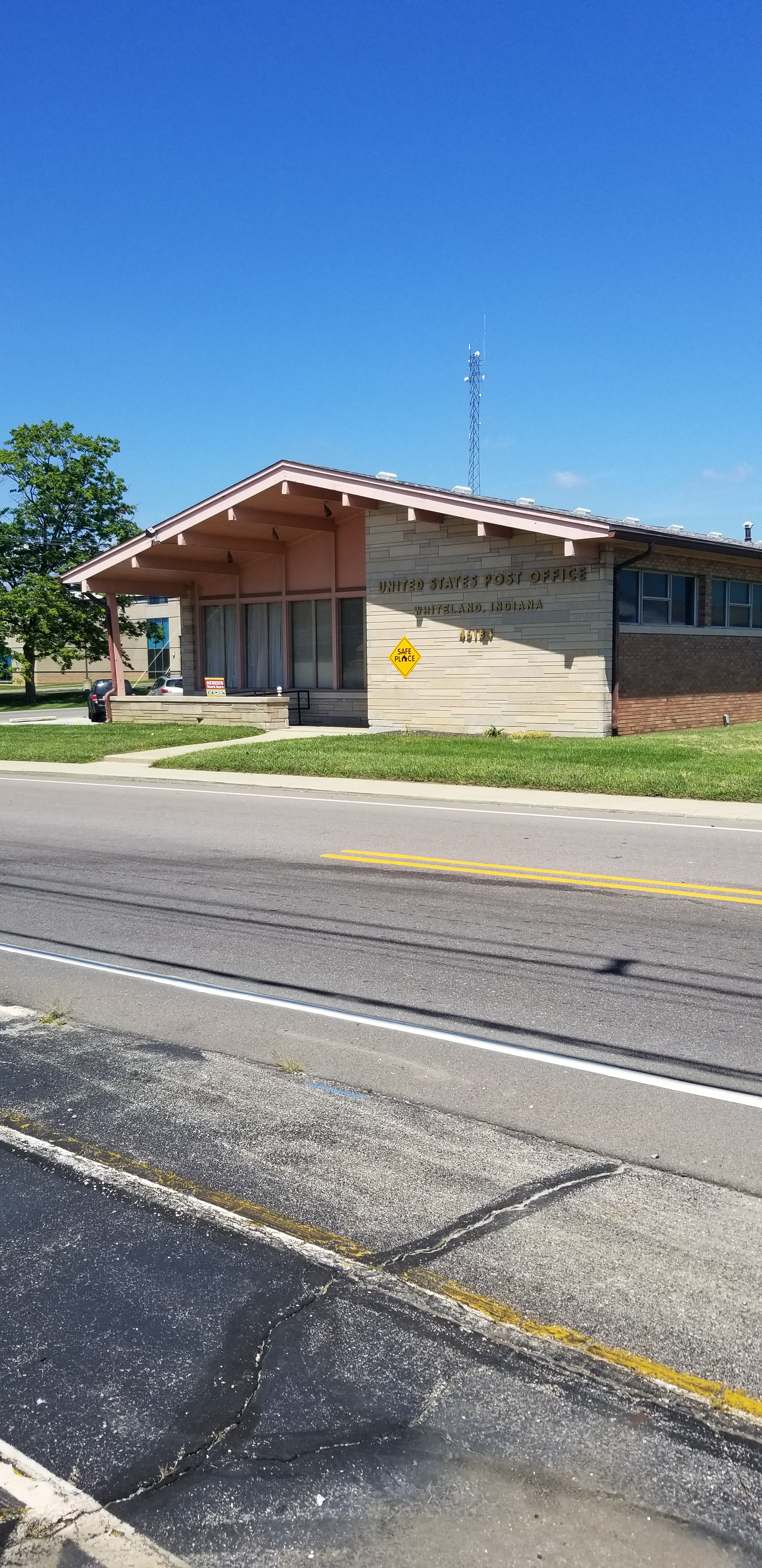
Whiteland, Indiana, Post Office

Whiteland is a town in Pleasant, Franklin and Clark townships, Johnson County, Indiana, United States. The population was 4,599 at the 2020 census.

Whiteland is located in north/central Johnson County approximately 19 miles (31 km) south of Indianapolis in Johnson County, which is one of the counties circling the capital city itself and therefore considered part of the Indianapolis metropolitan area. Major access roads to get to Whiteland are I-65 (exit 95 is the Whiteland exit), south on U.S. 31 from Indianapolis and north from Columbus.

== History ==
Whiteland was platted in 1863 by Joel B. White and others. The first school in the town was built in 1869, which was the only school in Whiteland until 1957, when a high school was built.

== Geography ==
According to the 2010 census, Whiteland has a total area of 3.22 square miles (8.34 km^{2}), all land.

=== Climate ===
The climate in this area is characterized by hot, humid summers and generally mild to cool winters. According to the Köppen Climate Classification system, Whiteland has a humid subtropical climate, abbreviated "Cfa" on climate maps.

== Demographics ==
Historical population
Census	Pop.	Note	%±
1880	230		—
1890	212		−7.8%
1900	334		57.5%
1910	343		2.7%
1920	388		13.1%
1930	419		8.0%
1940	403		−3.8%
1950	465		15.4%
1960	1,368		194.2%
1970	1,492		9.1%
1980	1,956		31.1%
1990	2,446		25.1%
2000	3,958		61.8%
2010	4,169		5.3%
2020	4,599		10.3%
U.S. Decennial Census

=== 2020 census ===
As of the 2020 census, Whiteland had a population of 4,599. The median age was 37.9 years. 25.3% of residents were under the age of 18 and 12.9% of residents were 65 years of age or older. For every 100 females there were 98.9 males, and for every 100 females age 18 and over there were 97.1 males age 18 and over.

98.9% of residents lived in urban areas, while 1.1% lived in rural areas.

There were 1,650 households in Whiteland, of which 36.6% had children under the age of 18 living in them. Of all households, 57.9% were married-couple households, 15.0% were households with a male householder and no spouse or partner present, and 18.7% were households with a female householder and no spouse or partner present. About 17.9% of all households were made up of individuals and 7.0% had someone living alone who was 65 years of age or older.

There were 1,680 housing units, of which 1.8% were vacant. The homeowner vacancy rate was 0.5% and the rental vacancy rate was 3.3%.

Racial composition as of the 2020 census
Race	Number	Percent
White	4,205	91.4%
Black or African American	31	0.7%
American Indian and Alaska Native	23	0.5%
Asian	47	1.0%
Native Hawaiian and Other Pacific Islander	3	0.1%
Some other race	63	1.4%
Two or more races	227	4.9%
Hispanic or Latino (of any race)	139	3.0%

=== 2010 census ===
As of the census of 2010, there were 4,169 people, 1,468 households, and 1,163 families living in the town. The population density was 1,294.7 inhabitants per square mile (499.9/km^{2}). There were 1,558 housing units at an average density of 483.9 per square mile (186.8/km^{2}). The racial makeup of the town was 97.0% White, 0.4% African American, 0.2% Native American, 0.7% Asian, 0.1% Pacific Islander, 0.6% from other races, and 1.1% from two or more races. Hispanic or Latino of any race were 1.8% of the population.

There were 1,468 households, of which 41.4% had children under the age of 18 living with them, 64.2% were married couples living together, 9.5% had a female householder with no husband present, 5.6% had a male householder with no wife present, and 20.8% were non-families. 15.6% of all households were made up of individuals, and 4.8% had someone living alone who was 65 years of age or older. The average household size was 2.84 and the average family size was 3.15.

The median age in the town was 37.3 years. 27.6% of residents were under the age of 18; 8.2% were between the ages of 18 and 24; 27.1% were from 25 to 44; 28.5% were from 45 to 64; and 8.5% were 65 years of age or older. The gender makeup of the town was 49.1% male and 50.9% female.

=== 2000 census ===
As of the census of 2000, there were 3,958 people, 1,355 households, and 1,116 families living in the town. The population density was 1,742.4 inhabitants per square mile (672.7/km^{2}). There were 1,404 housing units at an average density of 618.1 per square mile (238.6/km^{2}). The racial makeup of the town was 98.46% White, 0.05% African American, 0.10% Native American, 0.35% Asian, 0.56% from other races, and 0.48% from two or more races. Hispanic or Latino of any race were 1.09% of the population.

There were 1,355 households, out of which 47.8% had children under the age of 18 living with them, 70.6% were married couples living together, 9.3% had a female householder with no husband present, and 17.6% were non-families. 13.6% of all households were made up of individuals, and 4.6% had someone living alone who was 65 years of age or older. The average household size was 2.92 and the average family size was 3.23.

In the town, the population was spread out, with 32.2% under the age of 18, 6.2% from 18 to 24, 36.5% from 25 to 44, 18.4% from 45 to 64, and 6.7% who were 65 years of age or older. The median age was 33 years. For every 100 females, there were 98.6 males. For every 100 females age 18 and over, there were 95.1 males.

The median income for a household in the town was $56,944, and the median income for a family was $61,810. Males had a median income of $42,247 versus $29,005 for females. The per capita income for the town was $21,169. About 1.0% of families and 1.9% of the population were below the poverty line, including 2.6% of those under age 18 and none of those age 65 or over.

== Education ==
The first school in the town was built in 1869. This remained the only school in Whiteland, until 1957, when a high school was built.

== Notable people ==
- George Crowe, professional baseball player
- Ray Crowe, Member of the Indiana House of Representatives
- Bob Glidden, professional drag racer
- Guilford M. Wiley, politician
