= Clark Township, Cole County, Missouri =

Township in Cole County, Missouri, United States

Coordinates: 38.4181°N 92.3289°W

Clark Township is an inactive township in Cole County, in the U.S. state of Missouri.

Clark Township has the name of James Clark, a pioneer citizen.
