= Whiteland Community High School =

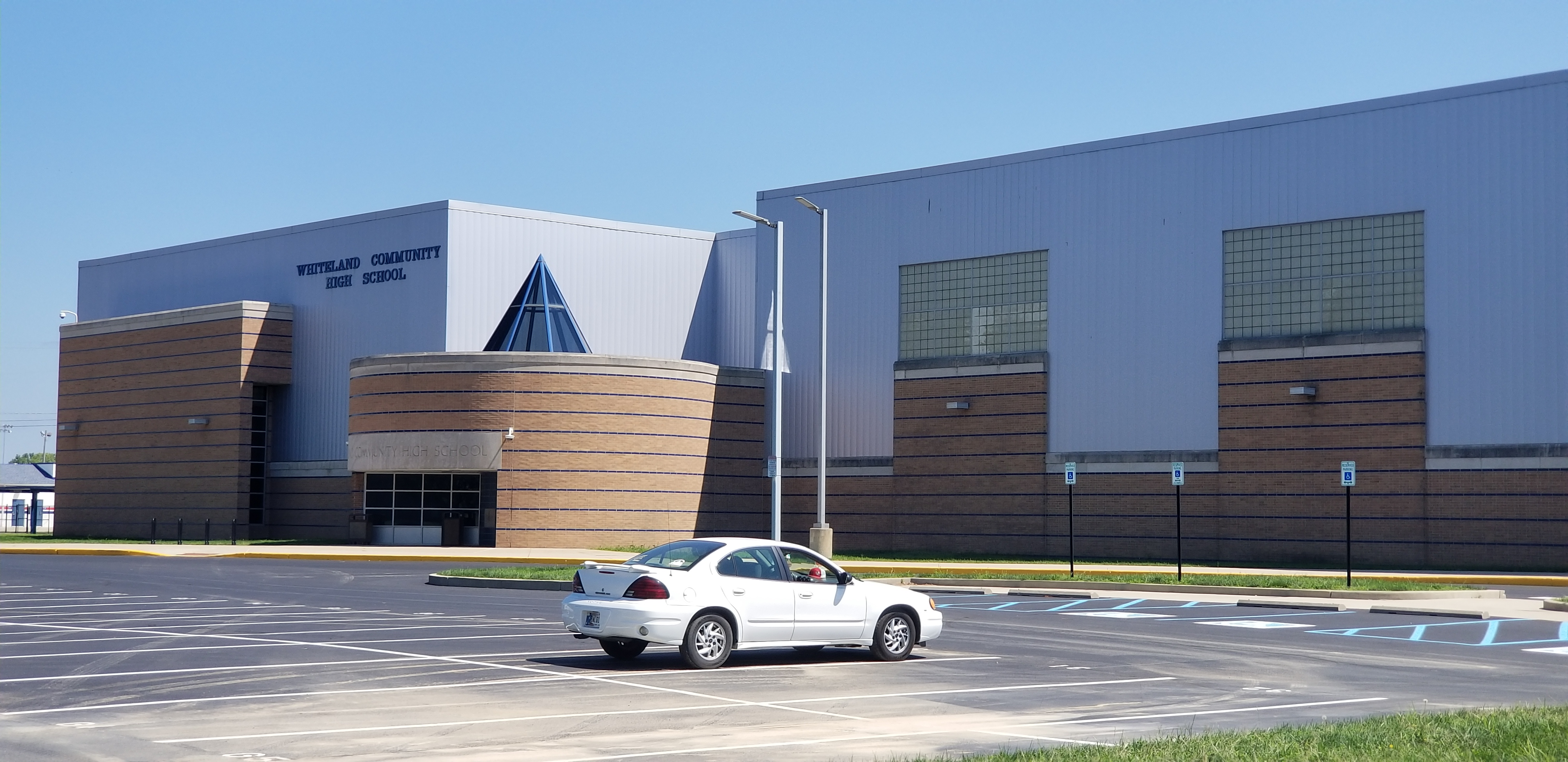

Location
- 300 Main St; Whiteland, Indiana 46184; United States
- Coordinates: 39.551565°N 86.083923°W

Information
- Type: Public high school
- Established: 1965
- School district: Clark-Pleasant Community School Corporation
- Superintendent: Timothy Edsell
- Principal: Duke Lines
- Faculty: 115.77 (FTE)
- Grades: 9–12
- Enrollment: 2,082 (2023–24)
- Student to teacher ratio: 17.98
- Color
- Athletics conference: Mid-State
- Team name: Warriors
- Newspaper: WHEN
- Website: www.cpcsc.k12.in.us/o/wchs

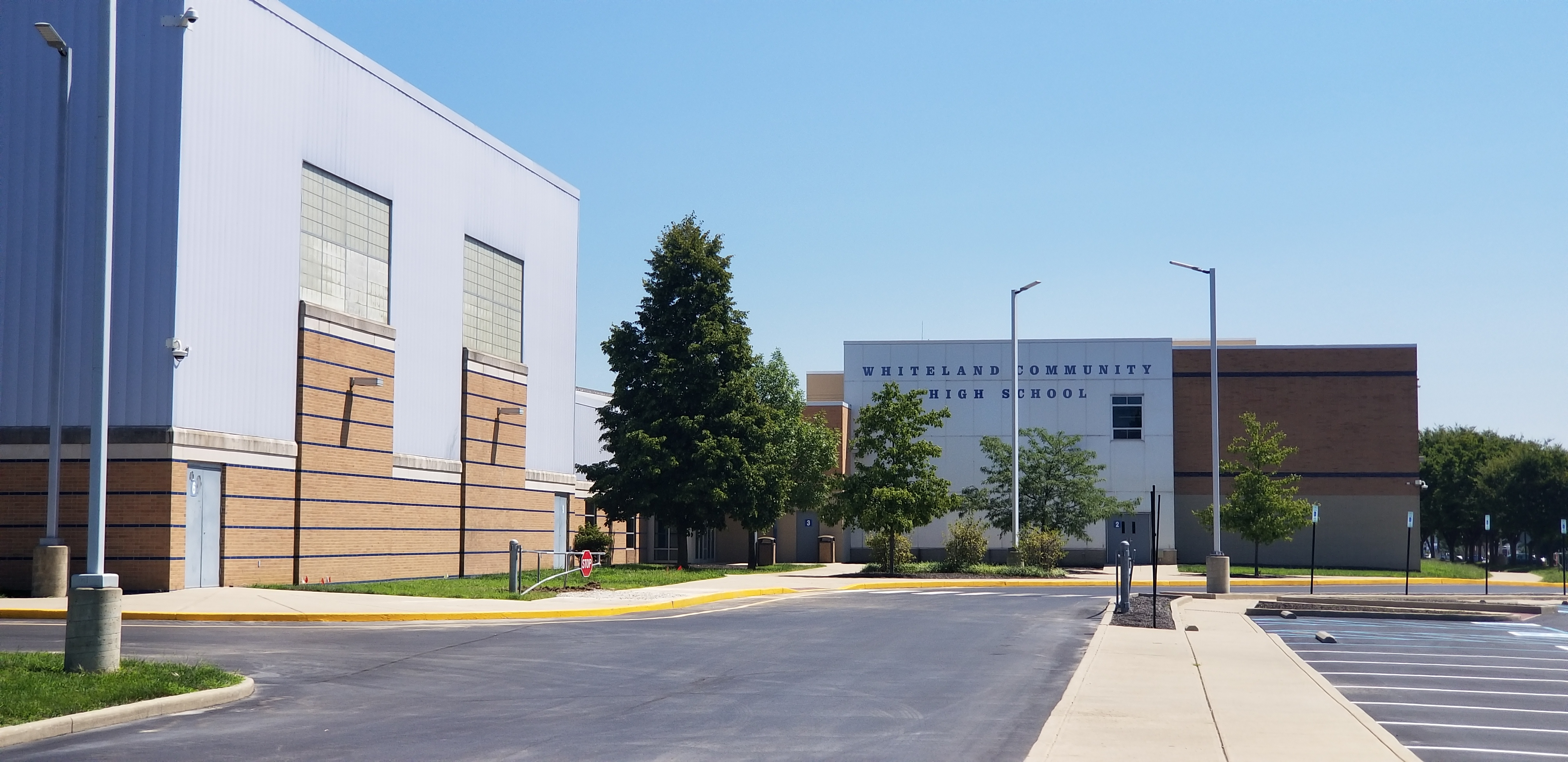
Whiteland Community High School

Whiteland Community High School (or WCHS) is a public high school located in Whiteland, Indiana. It is the only high school in continuous use in the town of Whiteland.

It is a part of the Clark-Pleasant Community School Corporation, which serves Whiteland, New Whiteland, much of Greenwood, and a small section of northern Franklin.

== Athletics ==
Whiteland Community High School teams are named the "Warriors".

Conference History

Conference	Years
Johnson County	1964-1964
Independent	1965-1967
Mid-State	1968-2024

== See also ==
- List of high schools in Indiana
