= Pleasant Township, Johnson County, Indiana =

Pleasant Township
- Township
- Coordinates: 39°35′04″N 86°05′13″W
- Country: United States
- State: Indiana
- County: Johnson

Government
  - Type: Indiana township

Area
  - Total: 35.29 sq mi (91.4 km^{2})
  - Land: 35.27 sq mi (91.3 km^{2})
  - Water: 0.02 sq mi (0.052 km^{2})
- Elevation: 820 ft (250 m)

Population (2020)
  - Total: 62,086
  - Density: 1,501.4/sq mi (579.7/km^{2})
- FIPS code: 18-60390
- GNIS feature ID: 453746

Pleasant Township is one of nine townships in Johnson County, Indiana. As of the 2010 census, its population was 52,957 and it contained 22,355 housing units.

Pleasant Township was organized in 1829.

== Geography ==
According to the 2010 census, the township has a total area of 35.29 square miles (91.4 km^{2}), of which 35.27 square miles (91.3 km^{2}) (or 99.94%) is land and 0.02 square miles (0.052 km^{2}) (or 0.06%) is water.
