= Clark Township, Johnson County, Indiana =

Clark Township
- Township
- Coordinates: 39°35′05″N 85°59′45″W
- Country: United States
- State: Indiana
- County: Johnson

Government
  - Type: Indiana township

Area
  - Total: 34.44 sq mi (89.2 km^{2})
  - Land: 34.43 sq mi (89.2 km^{2})
  - Water: 0.02 sq mi (0.052 km^{2})
- Elevation: 774 ft (236 m)

Population (2020)
  - Total: 2,887
  - Density: 71.5/sq mi (27.6/km^{2})
- FIPS code: 18-12781
- GNIS feature ID: 453201

Clark Township is one of nine townships in Johnson County, Indiana. As of the 2010 census, its population was 2,460 and it contained 863 housing units.

== History ==
Clark Township was organized in 1838. It was named in honor of the Clark family of pioneer settlers.

The Heck-Hasler House was listed on the National Register of Historic Places in 2000.

== Geography ==
According to the 2010 census, the township has a total area of 34.44 square miles (89.2 km^{2}), of which 34.43 square miles (89.2 km^{2}) (or 99.97%) is land and 0.02 square miles (0.052 km^{2}) (or 0.06%) is water.
