= Youngs Creek =

Youngs Creek may refer to:

- Youngs Creek, Indiana, an unincorporated community
- Youngs Creek (Johnson County, Indiana), a stream
- Youngs Creek (Orange County, Indiana), a stream
- Youngs Creek (Long Branch tributary), a stream in Missouri
- Youngs Creek (Stinson Creek tributary), a stream in Missouri
- Youngs Creek (Lake Erie), a watershed administered by the Long Point Region Conservation Authority, that drains into Lake Erie

== See also ==
- Young Creek
