= Mill Creek (Jackson County, Indiana) =

Stream in Jackson County, Indiana, U.S.

Coordinates: 38°47′25″N 86°05′30″W

Mill Creek is a stream in Jackson County, Indiana, in the United States. It is a tributary to the White River.

Mill Creek was named from the mills built along its banks.

Mill Creek has a mean annual discharge of 324 cubic feet per second at Manhattan, Indiana (based on data from 1940 to 2003).

== See also ==
- List of rivers of Indiana
