= Jackson Creek (Monroe County, Indiana) =

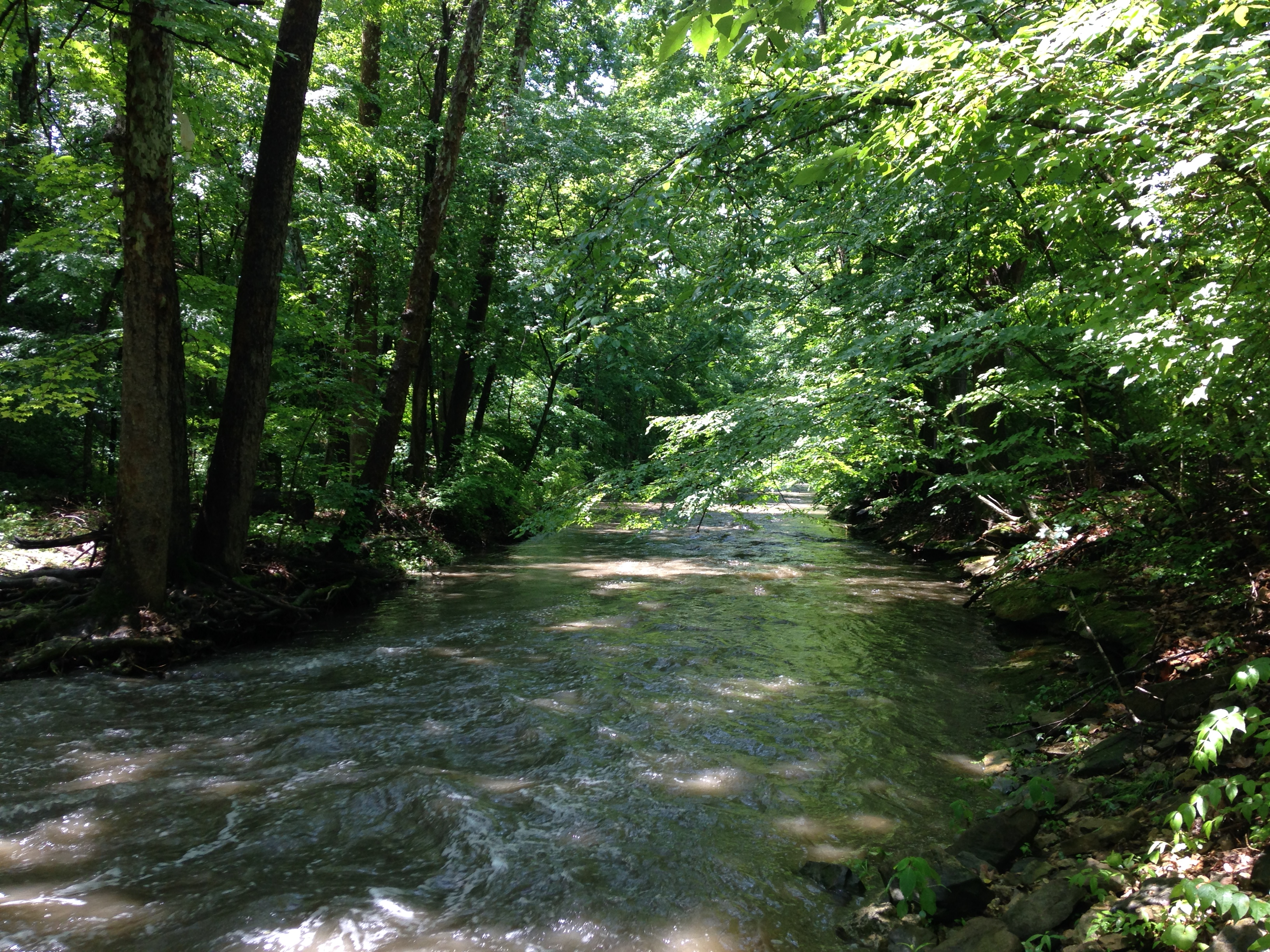
- Jackson Creek, south of Rock Creek Drive in Bloomington, Indiana USA May 30, 2015

Location
- Country: United States
- City: Bloomington

Physical characteristics
- Mouth
  - location: Clear Creek
  - coordinates: 39°06′01″N 86°32′23″W

Basin features
- Progression: South-west
- Tributaries
  - left: East Branch Jackson Creek, East Fork Jackson Creek and West Branch Jackson Creek

Jackson Creek is a creek in Monroe County, Indiana that drains the south-eastern part of the city of Bloomington. Flowing in the general south-western and southern direction, it flows into Clear Creek south of Bloomington. Clear Creek is a tributary of Salt Creek, which in turn flows into the East Fork of Indiana's White River.

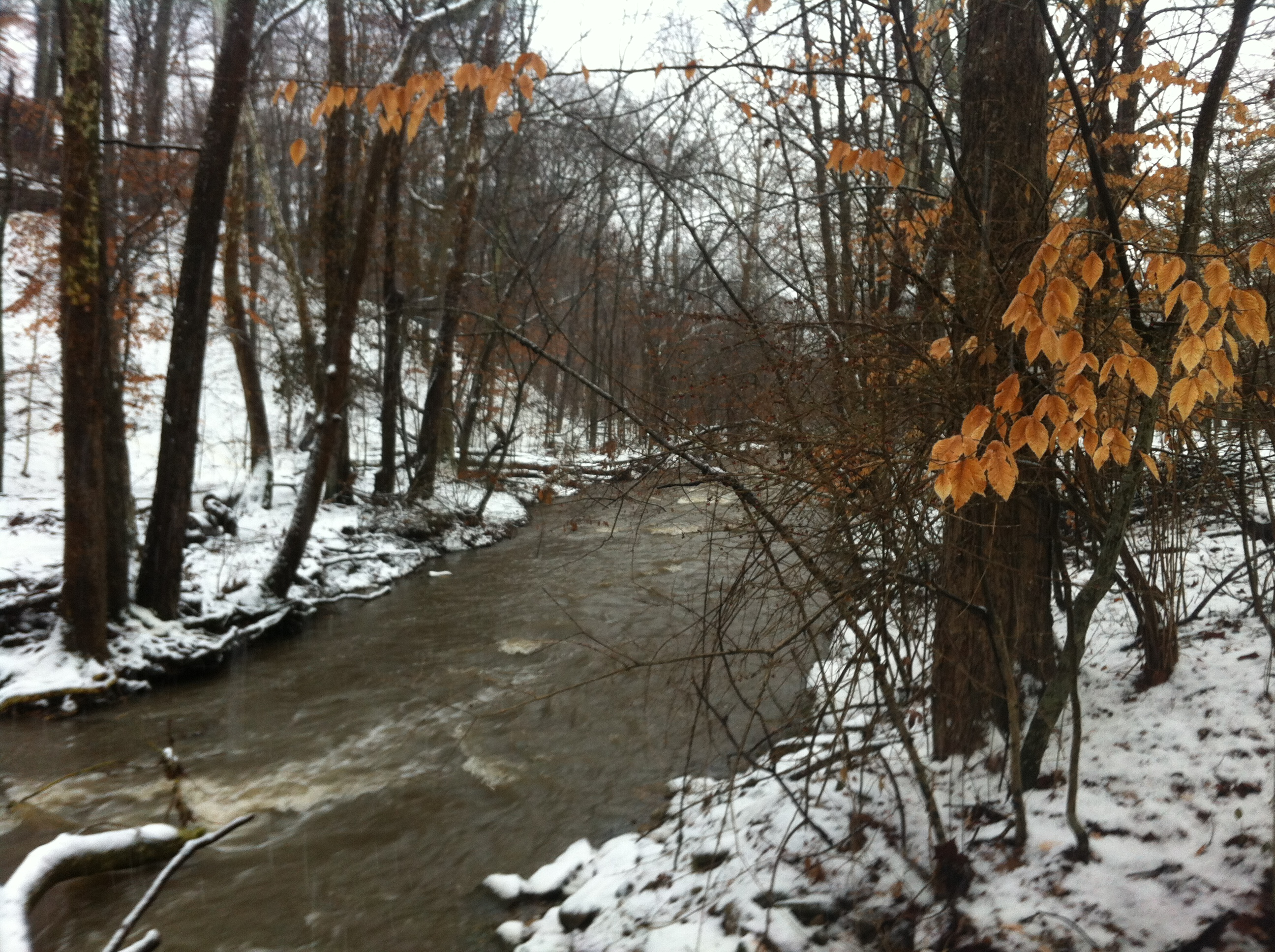
Jackson Creek, south of Rock Creek Drive in Bloomington, Indiana USA

Jackson Creek flows southward along College Mall Road from Buick Cadillac Blvd to Moores Pike, and then southward along Sare Road. It turns westward north of McCartney Lane and flows southwest, passing under Rogers Road just east of the High Street roundabout. It then flows through the city-owned "Goat Farm" property and Sherwood Oaks Park alongside Jackson Creek Trail. From there Jackson Creek continues to flow southwest, passing under Rhorer Road, Fairfax Road and Old State Road 37 / South Walnut Street. It then passes through Jackson Creek Park before flowing into Clear Creek just west of Rogers Road.

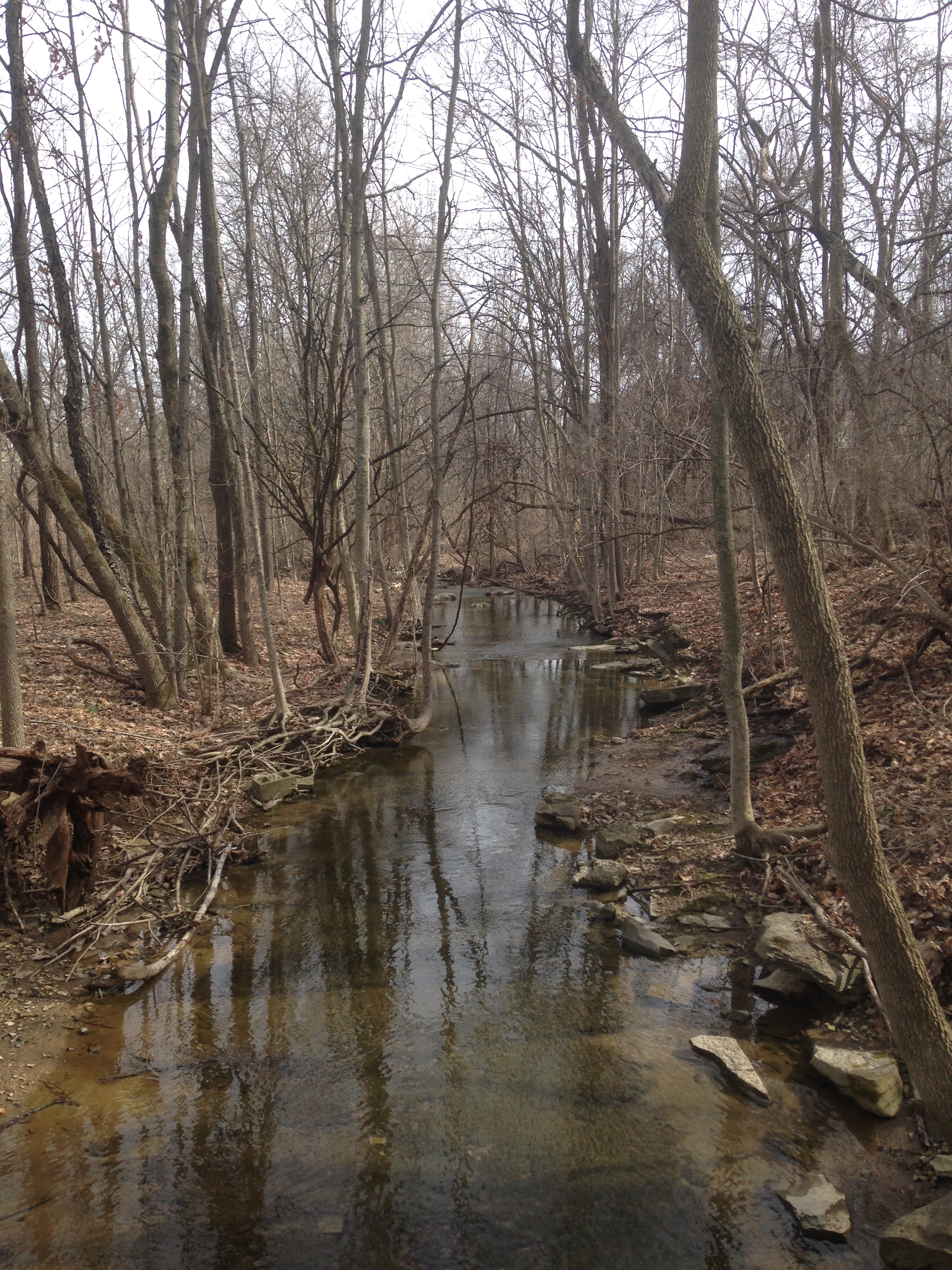
West Branch Jackson Creek alongside Renwick Trail, Bloomington, IN USA

== Tributaries ==
Jackson Creek's main tributaries are East Branch Jackson Creek, East Fork Jackson Creek and West Branch Jackson Creek. East Branch Jackson Creek originates north of Moores Pike and east of Fenbrook Lane and flows in the general southwest direction. It passes under Moores Pike and flows into Jackson Creek just east of Sare Road.

East Fork Jackson Creek originates northwest of the intersection of Moores Pike and State Road 446 and flows in the general southwest direction. It passes under Moores Pike, under Smith Road, through Schmalz Farm Park and under Rogers Road. It then passes under Rhorer Road and flows into Jackson Creek.

West Branch Jackson Creek originates in the vicinity of the intersection of S. High Street and E. Covenanter Drive and flows in the general southeast direction. It passes under Moores Pike and then through the far northeast corner of Southeast Park before flowing alongside Renwick Trail. It flows into Jackson Creek just west of Sare Road.

== See also ==
- List of rivers of Indiana
- Jackson Creek Trail
