= Mudhole Branch =

Stream in Dubois County, Indiana, U.S.

Coordinates: 38°28′26″N 86°57′12″W

Mudhole Branch is a stream in Dubois County, Indiana, in the United States.

Mudhole Branch was named from the fact buffalo once wallowed in the mud here.

== See also ==
- List of rivers of Indiana
