= Sugar Creek (Driftwood River tributary) =

River in Indiana, United States

Coordinates: 39.34644°N 85.99305°W

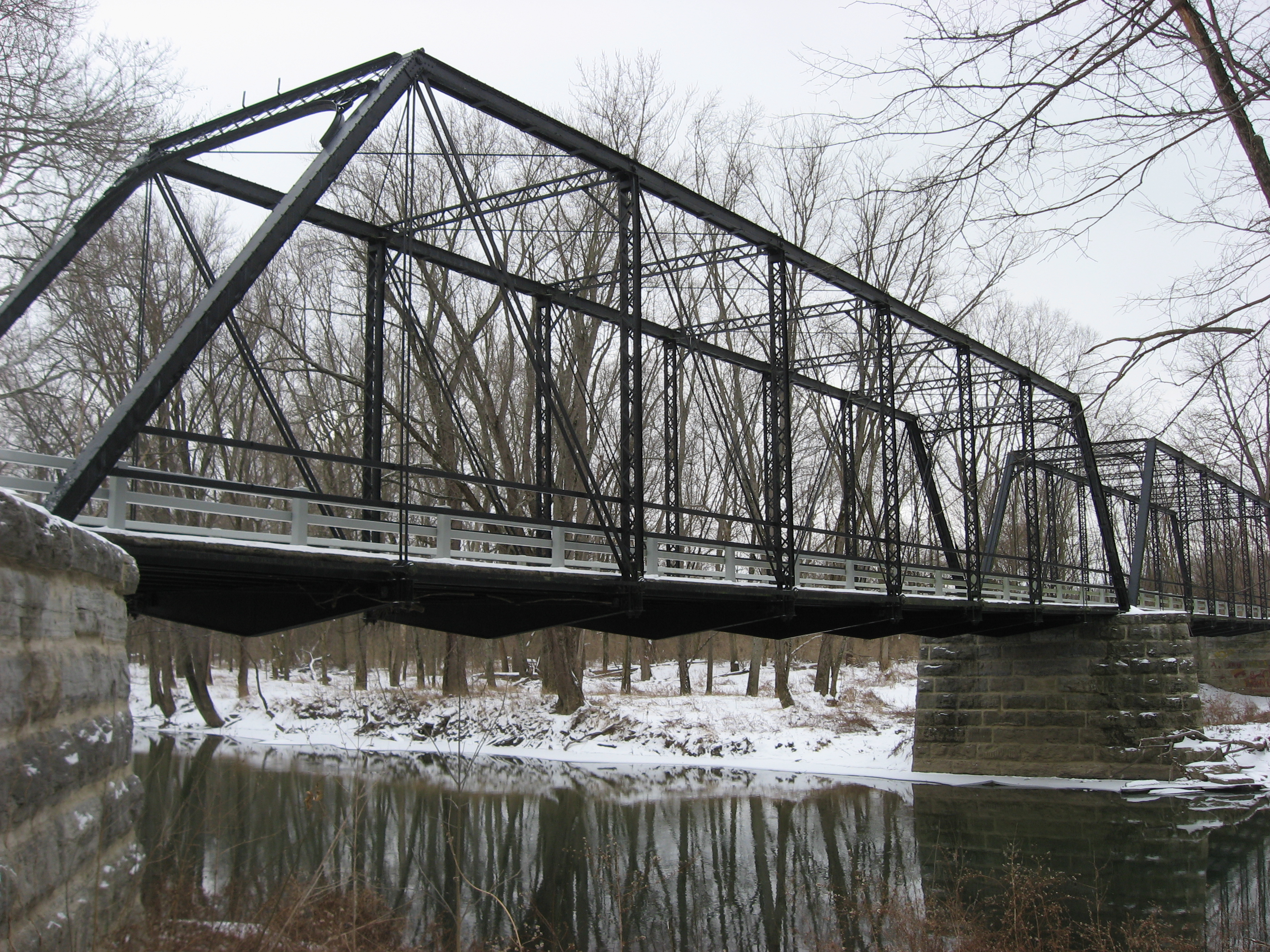
Furnas Mill Bridge over the Sugar Creek in Edinburgh

Sugar Creek is an 82.4-mile-long (132.6 km) tributary of the Driftwood River in east-central Indiana in the United States. Via the Driftwood, White, Wabash and Ohio rivers, it is part of the watershed of the Mississippi River.

Sugar Creek was likely so named from the sugar trees growing along its banks.

== Course ==
Sugar Creek rises in western Henry County and flows generally southwestwardly through Madison, Hancock, Shelby and Johnson counties, past the towns of Spring Lake and New Palestine. It joins the Big Blue River to form the Driftwood River in southeastern Johnson County, 1 mile (1.6 km) west of Edinburgh.

Sugar Creek has a mean annual discharge of 532 cubic feet per second near Edinburgh, Indiana.

== See also ==
- List of Indiana rivers
