= Edinburgh railway station =

Edinburgh railway station may refer to:

- Edinburgh Princes Street railway station, a former terminus station in Edinburgh (1848–1965)
- Edinburgh Waverley railway station, Edinburgh's main station
- Edinburgh station (Indiana)
