= Edinburgh Commercial Historic District =

Historic district in Indiana, United States

- U.S. National Register of Historic Places
- U.S. Historic district
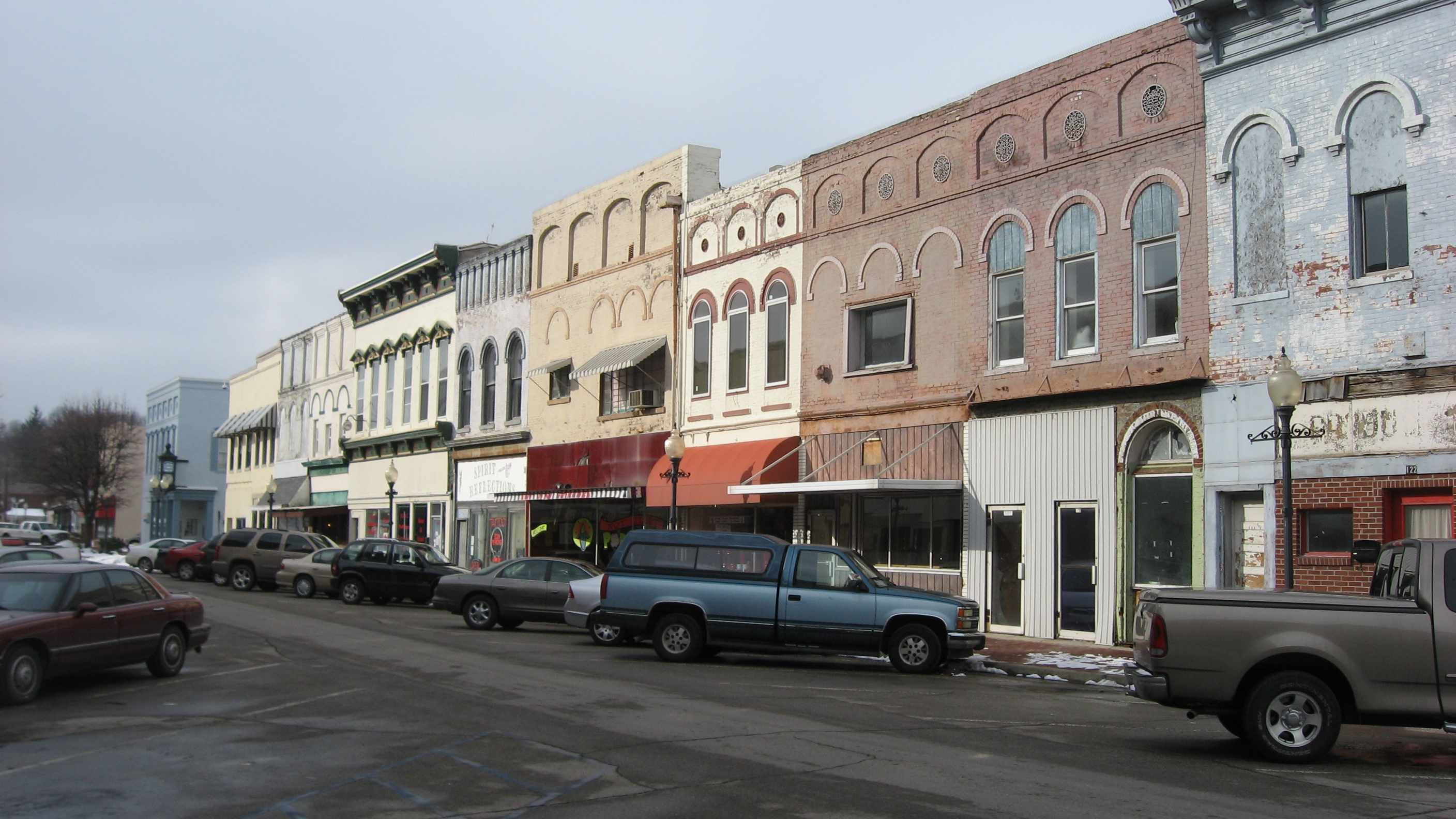
- E. Main Cross in the Edinburgh Commercial Historic District, January 2011

- Location within Indiana Location within the United States
- Location: Roughly bounded by Thompson and Main Sts., the alley N of Main Cross St. and the Conrail RR tracks, Edinburgh, Indiana
- Coordinates: 39°21′14″N 85°57′57″W
- Area: 9 acres (3.6 ha)
- Architect: Mesker, George L., & Co.
- Architectural style: Late 19th And 20th Century Revivals, Late Victorian, Late 19th And Early 20th Century American Movements
- NRHP reference No.: 91000789
- Added to NRHP: June 28, 1991

Edinburgh Commercial Historic District is a national historic district located in Edinburgh, Indiana, United States. The district encompasses 48 contributing buildings in the central business district of Edinburgh. It developed between about 1854 and 1941, and includes notable examples of Italianate, Late Victorian and Classical Revival style architecture. Notable buildings include the Edinburgh Interurban Depot (1919), Mooney House (c. 1865), A. C. Thompson / Danner Building (1854), A. C. Thompson Bank (1872), Masonic Temple (1915), IOOF Building (1888), Central Hotel / Toner House (1855), and Edinburgh Town Hall (1920).

It was listed on the National Register of Historic Places in 1991.
