= Driftwood River =

River in Indiana, United States

Coordinates: 39.20616°N 85.93360°W

The Driftwood River is a 15.5-mile-long (24.9 km) tributary of the East Fork of the White River in central Indiana in the United States. Via the White, Wabash and Ohio rivers, it is part of the watershed of the Mississippi River. It is a short river, formed by the confluence of two longer streams a short distance upstream of its mouth.

== Course ==
The Driftwood River is formed in southeastern Johnson County, 1 mile (1.6 km) west of Edinburgh, by the confluence of Sugar Creek and the Big Blue River. It flows generally southwardly through northwestern Bartholomew County to Columbus, where it joins the Flatrock River to form the East Fork of the White River.

Near Edinburgh, IN, Driftwood River has a mean annual discharge of 1,210 cubic feet per second.

== See also ==
- List of Indiana rivers
