= Big Blue River (Indiana) =

River in Indiana, United States

Coordinates: 39.346814°N 85.992523°W

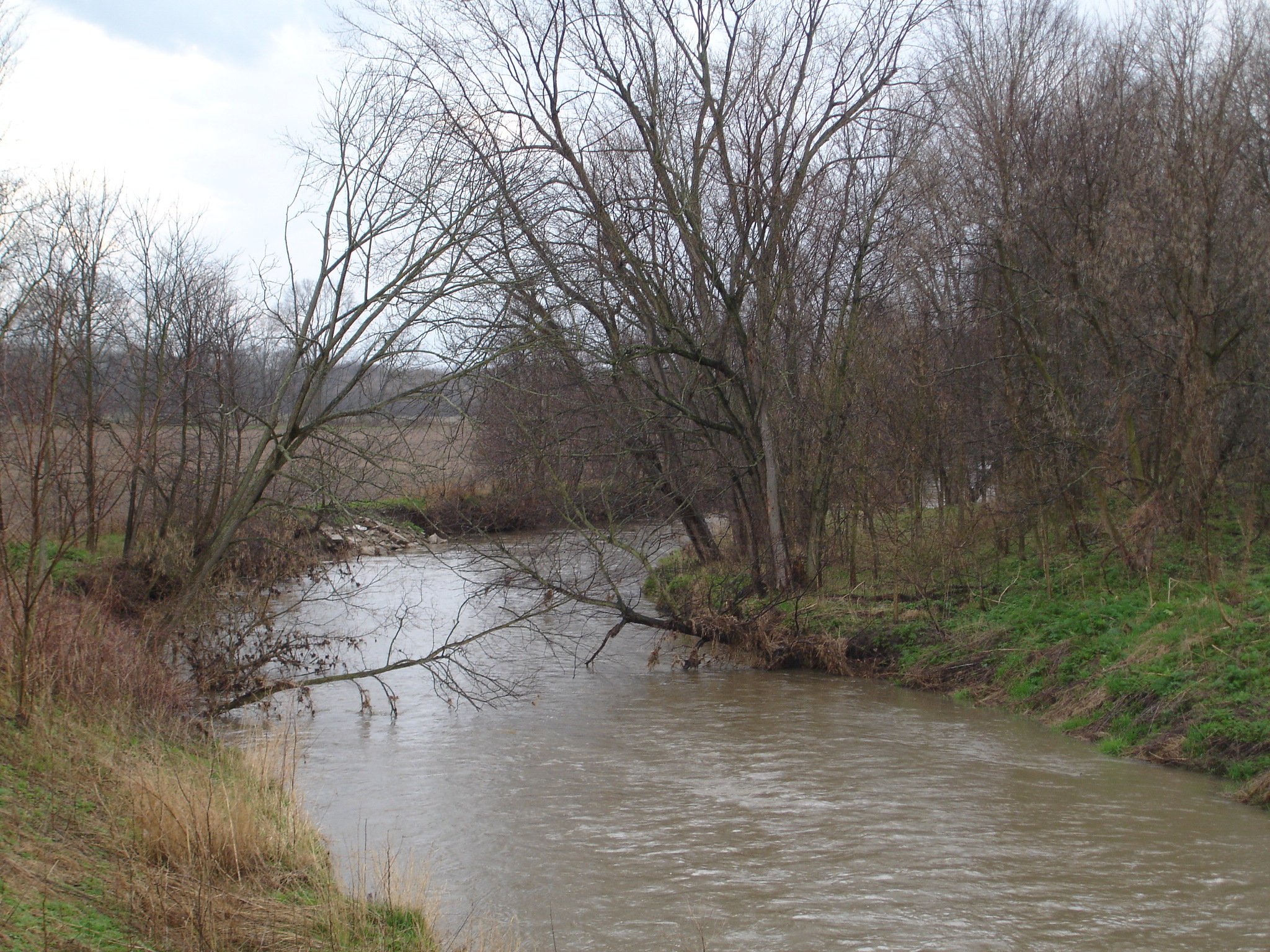
The Big Blue River in Henry County, southwest of New Castle.

The Big Blue River is an 83.8-mile-long (134.9 km) tributary of the Driftwood River in east-central Indiana in the United States. Via the Driftwood, White, Wabash and Ohio rivers, it is part of the watershed of the Mississippi River.

== Course ==
The Big Blue rises in northeastern Henry County and flows generally southwestwardly through Rush, Hancock, Shelby and Johnson counties, past the towns of New Castle, Knightstown, Carthage, Morristown, Shelbyville and Edinburgh. It joins Sugar Creek to form the Driftwood River 1 mile (1.6 km) west of Edinburgh. At Shelbyville, it collects the Little Blue River.

At the USGS station at Shelbyville, Indiana, the Big Blue River has an approximate discharge of 513 cubic feet per second.

== See also ==
- List of Indiana rivers
- County Line Bridge (Morristown, Indiana)
