= Greenville Creek =

Coordinates: 40°07′06″N 84°21′26″W

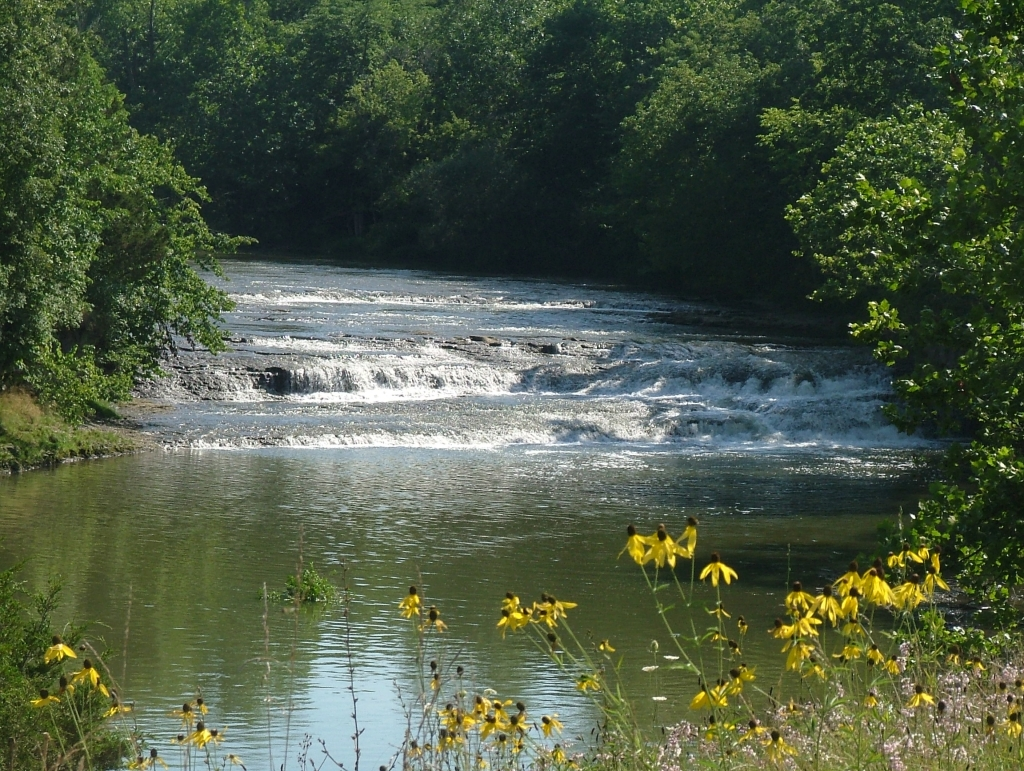
- Greenville Falls

Physical characteristics
- Source
  - location: Near Spartanburg, Indiana
  - elevation: ~ 1,155 ft (352 m)
- Mouth
  - location: Stillwater River near Covington, Ohio
  - elevation: ~ 875 ft (267 m)
- Basin size: 200 mi^{2} (520 km^{2})
- Discharge
  - location: near Bradford
  - average: 192 cu ft/s (5.4 m^{3}/s), USGS water years 1931-2019

Greenville Creek is a 44.4-mile-long (71.5 km) tributary of the Stillwater River in southwestern Ohio in the United States. Via the Stillwater River, the Great Miami River, and the Ohio River, its water flows to the Mississippi River and ultimately the Gulf of Mexico. The creek starts in extreme eastern Indiana in Randolph County. It soon flows into Darke County, Ohio, and joins with a tributary that also starts in Indiana, Dismal Creek. It flows through Greenville and Gettysburg before entering Miami County. Near its confluence with the Stillwater River at Covington it drops 20 feet (6.1 m) at Greenville Falls in a glacially-cut gorge that is a state nature preserve.

A USGS stream gauge on the creek near Bradford recorded a mean annual discharge of 192.8 cubic feet per second (5.46 m^{3}/s) during water years 1931–2019. The highest daily mean discharge during that period was 7,920 cu ft/s (224 m^{3}/s) on May 14, 1933. The lowest daily mean discharge was 5.3 cu ft/s (0.15 m^{3}/s) on September 17, 1963.

== See also ==
- List of rivers of Indiana
- List of rivers of Ohio
