= Conns Creek =

Stream in Indiana, United States

Coordinates: 39°25′08″N 85°40′42″W

Conns Creek (also rendered Conn's Creek) is a stream in Shelby County, Indiana. It is a tributary of Flatrock river.

The creek bears the name of a family of settlers.

== See also ==
- List of rivers of Indiana
