= Silver Creek (Ohio River tributary) =

Coordinates: 38°17′18″N 85°47′30″W

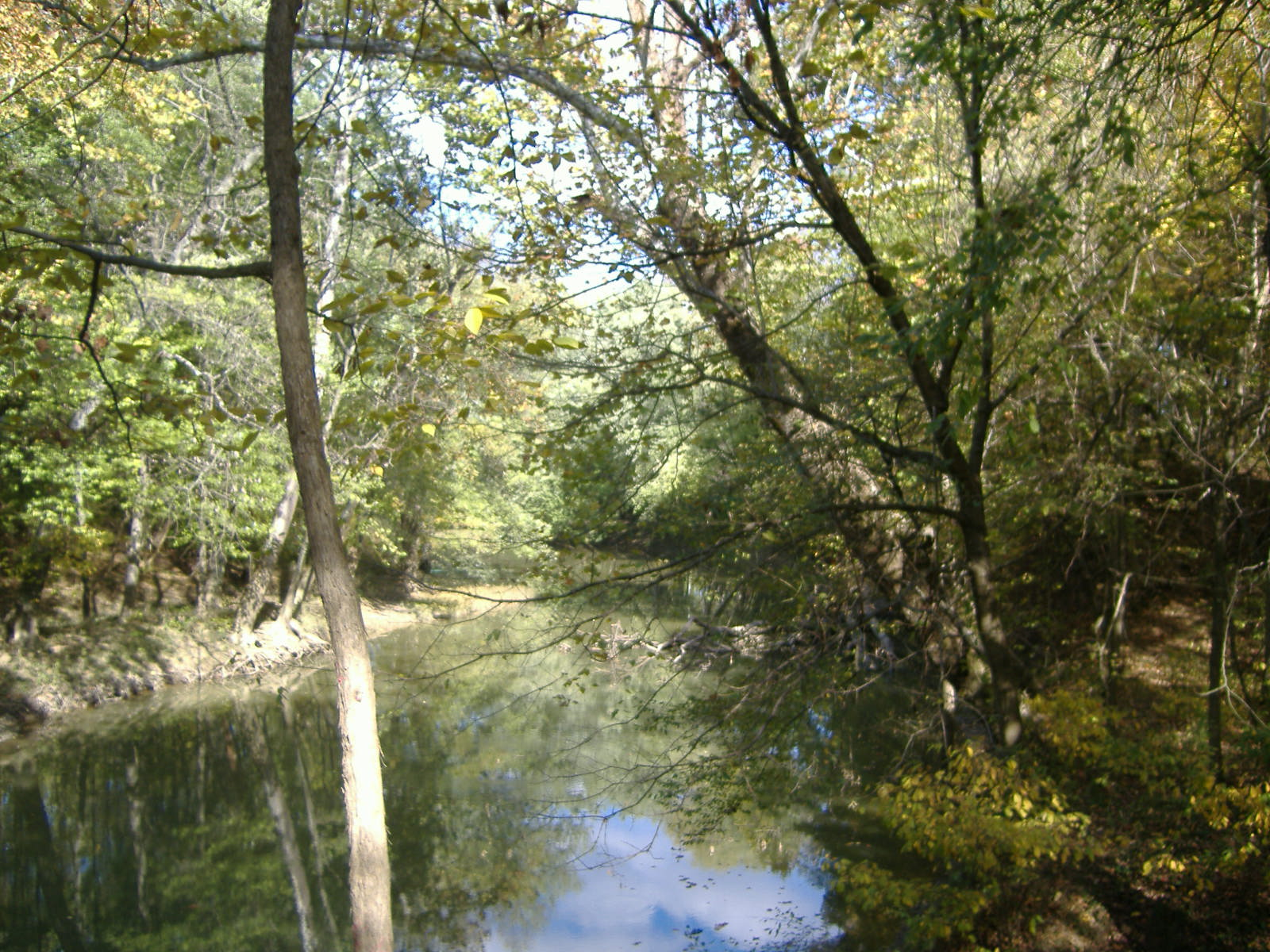
- Silver Creek, by Lapping Park

Location
- Country: US

Physical characteristics
- Mouth
  - location: Ohio River
- Length: 38 mi (61 km)
- Basin size: 97,442 acres (394.33 km^{2})

Silver Creek is a stream in southern Indiana in the United States. It drains a watershed of 97,442 acres (394.33 km^{2}). The creek rises in Scott County and flows 38.0 miles (61.2 km), dropping 168 feet (51 m), before flowing into the Ohio River.

It forms the boundary between Clark and Floyd counties. The stream was called Silver Creek by the time it was part of land granted to George Rogers Clark, who lived in a log cabin near the creek's mouth. It was named Silver Creek due to a rumor that silver treasure was hidden by creek, and that silver ore could be found.

At the mouth of the creek was the first cement operation in Indiana, at Beach's Mill in 1830.

The creek was the site of Shirt-Tail Bend, a popular dueling location for Kentuckians, as the practice was illegal in their state. The Silver Creek banks were the site at least four duels, including most famously one between Humphrey Marshall and Henry Clay on January 19, 1809. Both men suffered slight wounds. Marshall opposed Clay's proposal that all Kentucky legislators should wear domestic homespun rather than English broadcloth.

== See also ==
- List of rivers of Indiana
