= Lapping Park =

Park in Clarksville, Indiana

Lapping Memorial Park
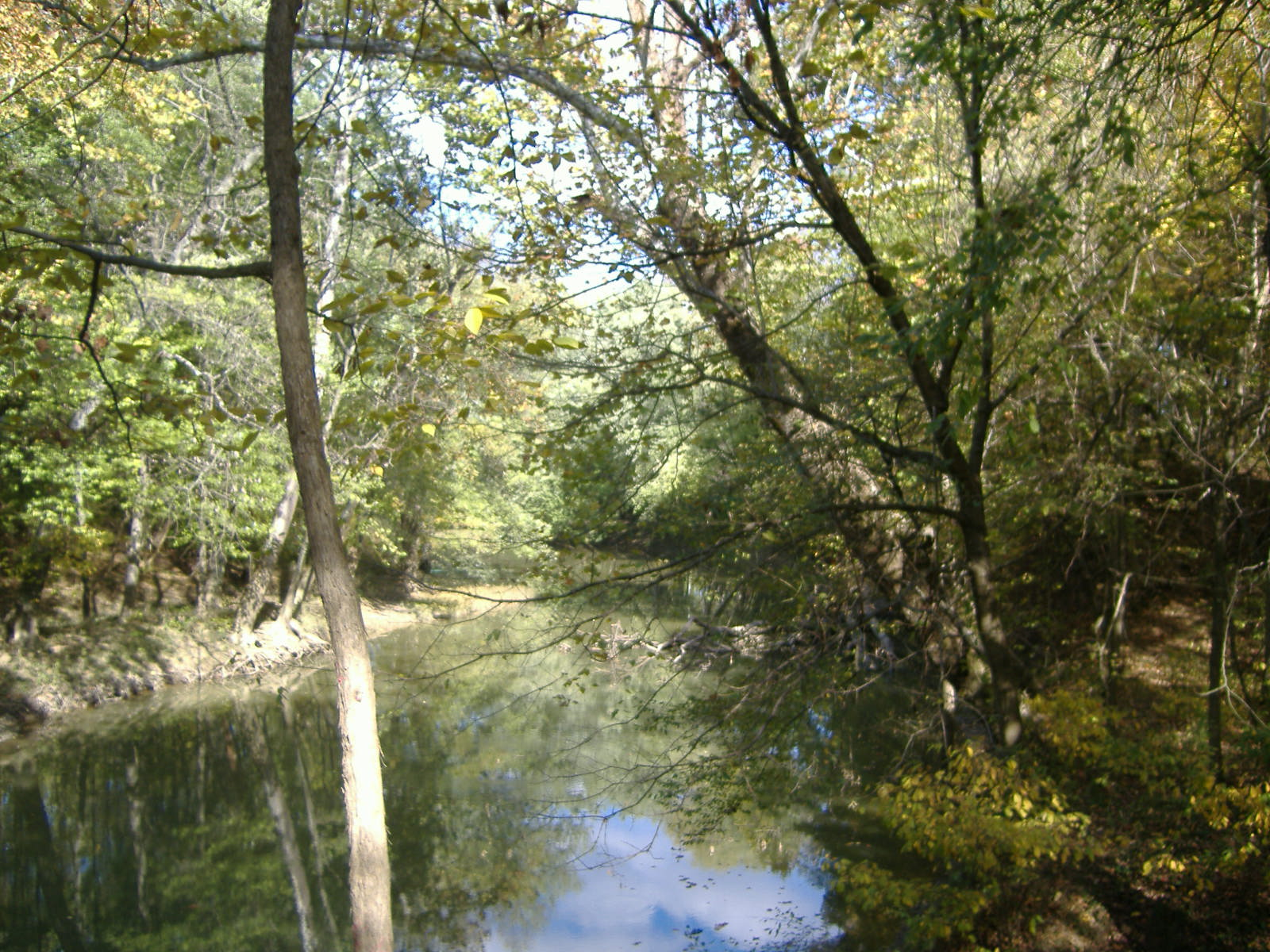
- The banks of Silver Creek at Lapping Park
- Interactive map of Lapping Memorial Park
- Type: Municipal
- Location: Clarksville, Indiana
- Coordinates: 38°20′20.0″N 85°46′19.8″W
- Area: 332 acres (134 ha)
- Operator: Clarksville Parks Department
- Status: Open all year

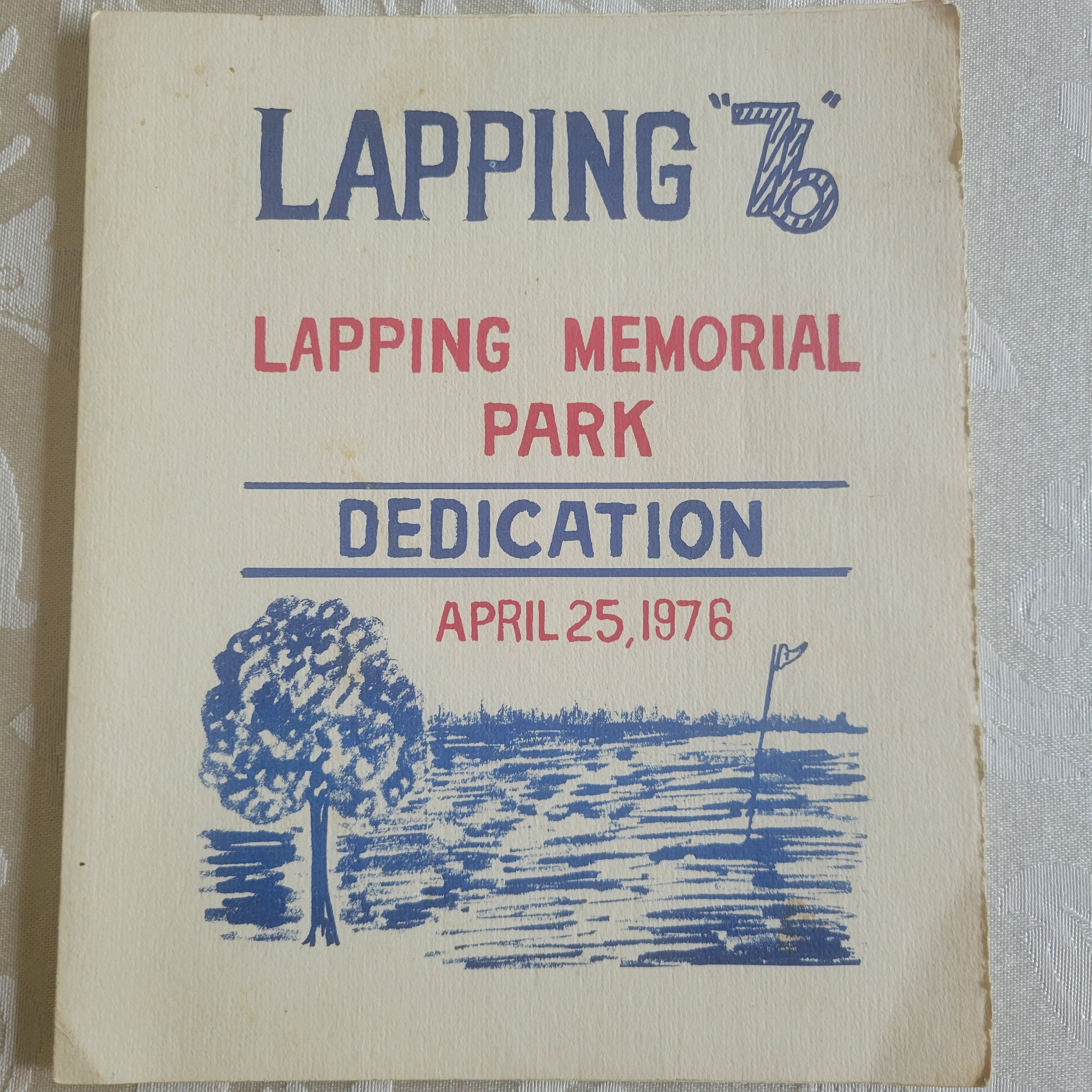
Lapping Park Dedication Program Front Page

Lapping Memorial Park is a park located in the town of Clarksville, Indiana. The park is a 332-acre (1.34 km^{2}) park that features play grounds, a Disc Golf course, softball fields, golf, tennis courts, basketball courts, volleyball space, horseshoe pits, amphitheater, lodge, shelter house, and three hiking trails immersed in a thick wooded scene.

== History ==
Lapping Memorial Park was dedicated on April 25, 1976. The property was owned at that time by Dorothy Lapping Steyn, heir to the estate of the late George B. Lapping. Upon deciding she no longer wanted or needed the property, she contacted local engineer Joseph Jacobi to survey the property and assist in the sale. Jacobi, being Clarksville's town engineer, contacted the town officials concerning the tract of land. After inspecting the property, the town officials immediately decided to investigate all possibilities of purchasing the property for Clarksville from Dorothy and her husband, Jacque. The Steyns agreed to sell the tract to the town in 1972 provided the park was named in honor of their late father, and with the stipulation that Jim "Pop" Miller (who had tended the property for many years) be allowed to remain on the property in the capacity of caretaker for as long as he desired. By this time, Pop had resided there for around 50 years. Pop remained there until his death some 20 years later. The sale was finalized, with the town securing 50% of the funds from the Bureau of Outdoor Recreation.

Prior to the sale, the property had been in the family for a number of years and had been used as a camp by the Steyn family and was farmed by the Miller family. The lodge on site was originally named the "Flatwoods" lodge by the owners but was renamed to the Endris lodge sometime after the sale.

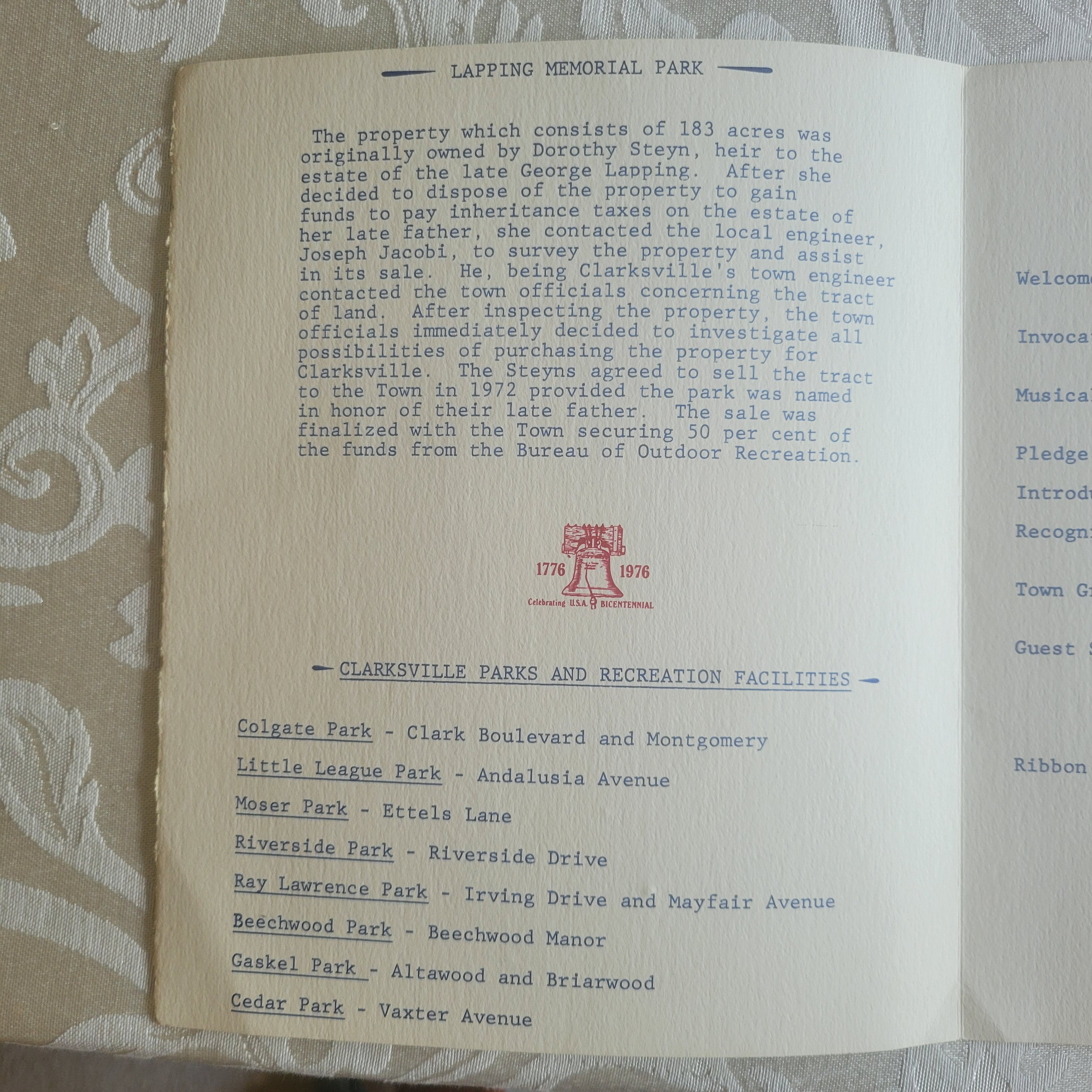
Lapping Park Dedication Program 2nd page

== Woodland and wildlife ==
The western part of the park runs along the banks of Silver Creek. The Knob and Valley Audubon Society (KAVAS) conducted a survey of birds in 1970 in which about 45 species were found to be inhabitants and visitors to the park including species of wood warbler, flycatchers, blue heron and woodpecker birds. Other wild life include deer, beaver, foxes, squirrels, owls, opossum, and raccoons.
