= Flatrock River =

Flatrock River Flatrock Creek
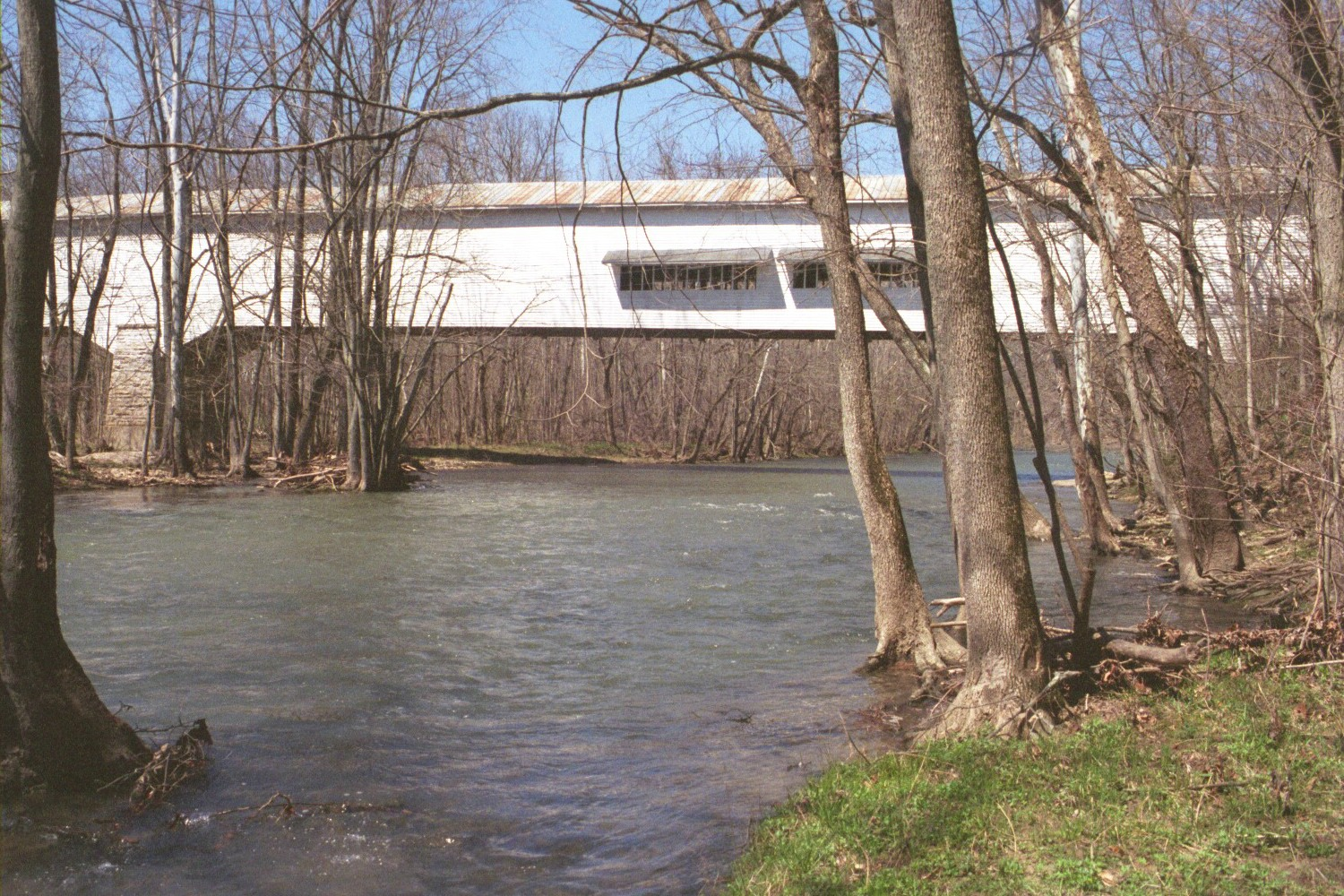

Location
- Country: United States
- State: Indiana
- Cities: Mooreland, Indiana; Lewisville, Indiana; Rushville, Indiana; Columbus, Indiana

Physical characteristics
- Source: Driftwood River
  - location: Columbus, Indiana
- Mouth: White River
  - location: Mooreland, Indiana, Indiana
  - coordinates: 39°12′22″N 85°56′01″W
- Length: 98 mi (158 km)
- Discharge
  - location: Columbus, Indiana
  - average: 649 cu/ft. per sec.

Basin features
- Tributaries
  - left: White River

The Flatrock River, also known as Flatrock Creek and other variants of the two names, is a 98-mile-long (158 km) tributary of the East Fork of the White River in east-central Indiana, United States. Via the White, Wabash and Ohio rivers, it is part of the watershed of the Mississippi River, draining an area of 532 square miles (1,380 km^{2}).

The Flatrock River rises near Mooreland in northeastern Henry County, and flows generally southwestwardly through Rush, Decatur, Shelby and Bartholomew counties, past the communities of Lewisville, Rushville and St. Paul. It joins the Driftwood River at Columbus to form the East Fork of the White River. The New Hope Bridge and Pugh Ford Bridge span the river in Bartholomew County, Indiana.

In Decatur County it collects the Little Flatrock River, which rises in Rush County and flows southwestwardly 23.4 miles (37.7 km), past Milroy. In Shelby County it collects Conns Creek.

== Variant names ==
The United States Board on Geographic Names settled on "Flat Rock River" as the stream's name in 1917, and changed it to "Flatrock River" in 1959. According to the Geographic Names Information System, it has also been known historically as "Big Flat Rock River," "Big Flatrock River," "Flat Rock Creek," and "Flatrock Creek."

== See also ==
- List of Indiana rivers
