= South Walnut Street Historic District (Edinburgh, Indiana) =

Historic district in Indiana, United States

- U.S. National Register of Historic Places
- U.S. Historic district
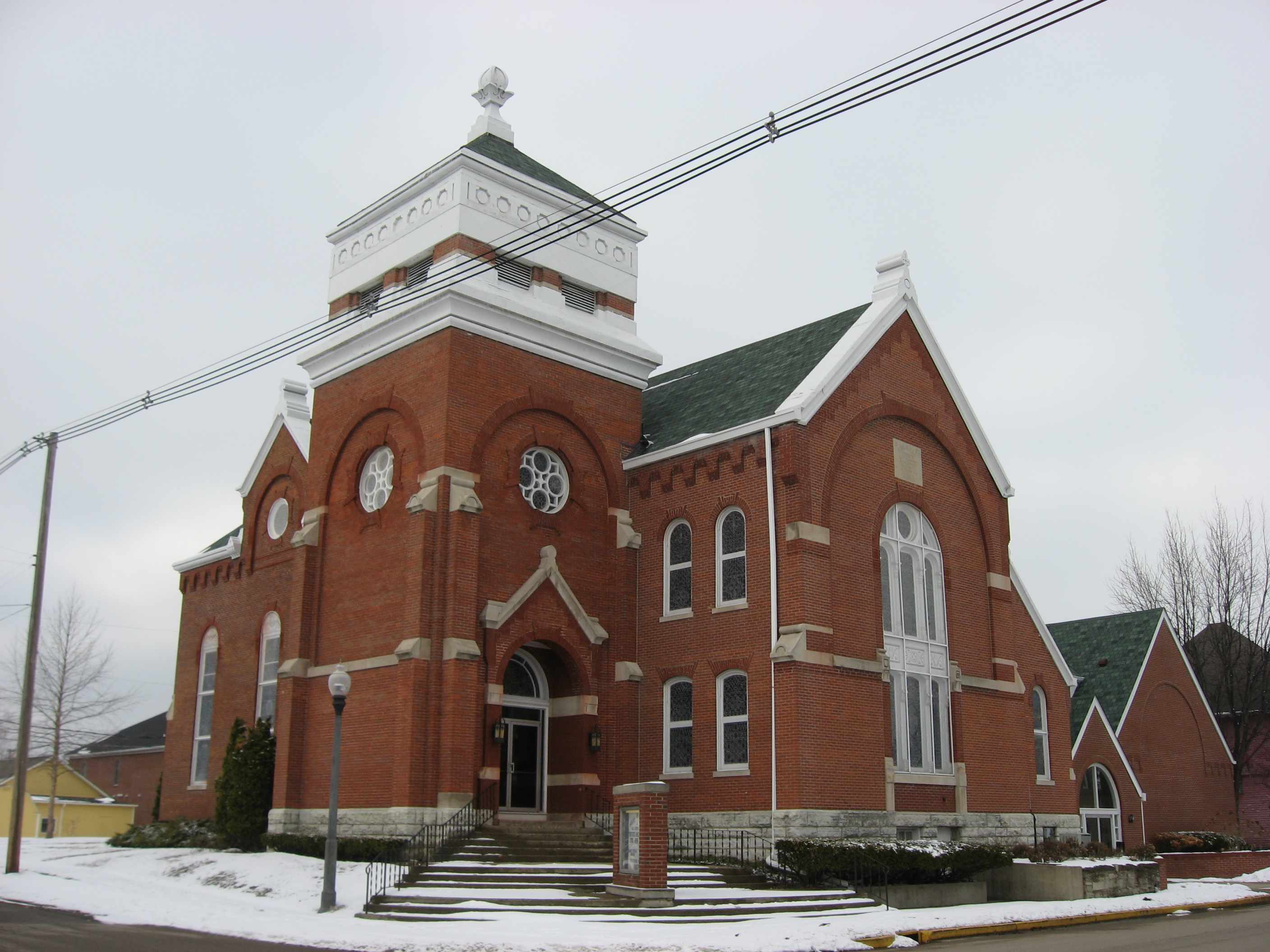
- House of Mercy Full Gospel Church, January 2011

- Location within Indiana Location within the United States
- Location: Roughly both sides of S. Walnut St. from Thompson St. south to 507 and 514 S. Walnut, plus the 100 block of W. Campbell, Edinburgh, Indiana
- Coordinates: 39°21′05″N 85°57′59″W
- Area: 27 acres (11 ha)
- Architect: Bruce, John; Woodsides, Martin
- Architectural style: Greek Revival, Italianate, Queen Anne, Romanesque, Bungalow/Craftsman
- NRHP reference No.: 11000126
- Added to NRHP: March 21, 2011

South Walnut Street Historic District is a national historic district located at Edinburgh, Indiana. The district encompasses 41 contributing buildings in a predominantly residential section of Edinburgh. It developed between about 1850 and 1935, and includes notable examples of Greek Revival, Italianate, Queen Anne, Romanesque Revival, and Bungalow / American Craftsman style architecture. The dwellings include tiny works' cottages, modest middle-class homes, and large expensive homes of the wealthy. Notable buildings include the First Christian Church (1887, now House of Mercy Full Gospel Church) and the Methodist Church.

It was listed on the National Register of Historic Places in 2011.
