= Youngs Creek, Indiana =

- Unincorporated community
- Location within Indiana Location within the United States
- Coordinates: 38°28′36″N 86°29′44″W
- Country: United States
- State: Indiana
- County: Orange
- Township: Greenfield
- Elevation: 597 ft (182 m)
- Time zone: UTC-5 (Eastern (EST))
  - Summer (DST): UTC-4 (EDT)
- ZIP code: 47454
- Area codes: 812, 930
- GNIS feature ID: 451651

Youngs Creek is an unincorporated community in Greenfield Township, Orange County, in the U.S. state of Indiana.

== History ==
The community's original name was Unionville. Unionville was founded in about 1864, and was renamed Youngs Creek after a nearby stream of the same name when the post office was established. A post office was established at Youngs Creek in 1867, and remained in operation until it was discontinued in 1976.
