= Stillwater River (Ohio) =

River in Ohio, United States

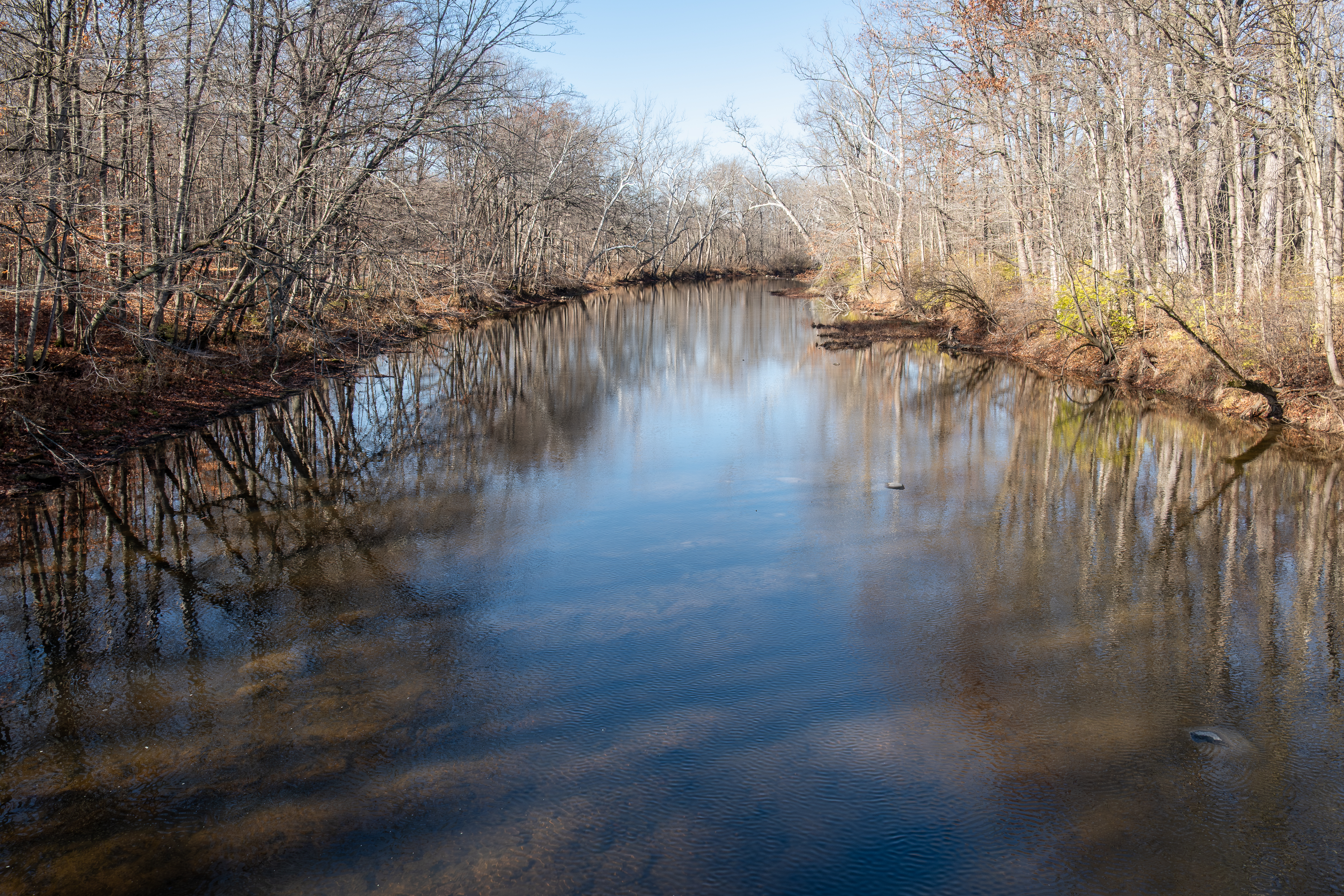
- Stillwater River in Miami County

Physical characteristics
- Source
  - location: Near Union City, Ohio
  - coordinates: 40.2606025°N 84.7566278°W
  - elevation: ~ 1,050 ft (320 m)
- Mouth
  - location: Great Miami River in Dayton
  - coordinates: 39.7783918°N 84.2004964°W
  - elevation: ~ 750 ft (230 m)
- Length: 69 mi (111 km)
- Basin size: 682 mi^{2} (1,770 km^{2})
- Discharge
  - location: Englewood
  - average: 632.2 cu ft/s (17.90 m^{3}/s), USGS water years 1926-2019

The Stillwater River is a 69.3-mile-long (111.5 km) tributary of the Great Miami River in western Ohio in the United States. Via the Great Miami and Ohio rivers, it is part of the Mississippi River watershed.

It rises near the Indiana state line, in western Darke County, approximately 10 miles (16 km) northwest of Greenville. It flows east-southeast and is joined by Greenville Creek in Covington, approximately 5 miles (8 km) west of Piqua. It flows south past Covington and Englewood, where it is dammed for flood control, then southeast to join the Great Miami River in Dayton.

Stillwater River was so named on account of its relatively slow current. The Stillwater River was one of the Great Miami River tributaries that flooded during the Great Dayton Flood of 1913, resulting in the creation of the Miami Conservancy District. In 1975, the lowermost 58 miles (93 km) of the river was designated a state scenic river, along with 35 miles (56 km) of Greenville Creek.

== Variant names ==
According to the Geographic Names Information System, the Stillwater River has also been known as:

- Jacobs Lateral
- Southwest Branch
- Stillwater Creek

== See also ==
- List of rivers of Ohio
