= Edinburgh station (Indiana) =

Railway station in the United States

Edinburgh

General information
- Location: 114 West Main Cross Street; Edinburgh, Indiana
- Coordinates: 39.3544°N 85.9676°W

History
- Closed: September 8, 1941
- Rebuilt: 1919

Services
Preceding station	Interstate Public Service	Following station
Stop 42 toward Indianapolis	Main Line	Stop 43 toward Louisville
- Edinburgh Interurban Depot
- U.S. Historic district – Contributing property
- Part of: Edinburgh Commercial Historic District (ID91000789)
- Designated CP: June 28, 1991
Location

Edinburgh station is a former interurban railway station in Edinburgh, Indiana, located at the corner of Main Street and West Main Cross Street. Tracks of the Indianapolis, Columbus and Southern Traction Company were laid through Edinburgh in 1902. The existing station building was constructed by the Interstate Public Service Company in 1919, designed as a passenger depot as well as an electrical substation. Service ceased after September 8, 1941. It was designated as a contributing property of the Edinburgh Commercial Historic District in 1991.
