= Little Cedar Creek (Indiana) =

Coordinates: 41°15′18″N 85°08′11″W

Little Cedar Creek is a stream in Noble County, Indiana, in the United States.

== See also ==
- List of rivers of Indiana
