= Toner Historic District =

Historic district in Indiana, United States

- U.S. National Register of Historic Places
- U.S. Historic district
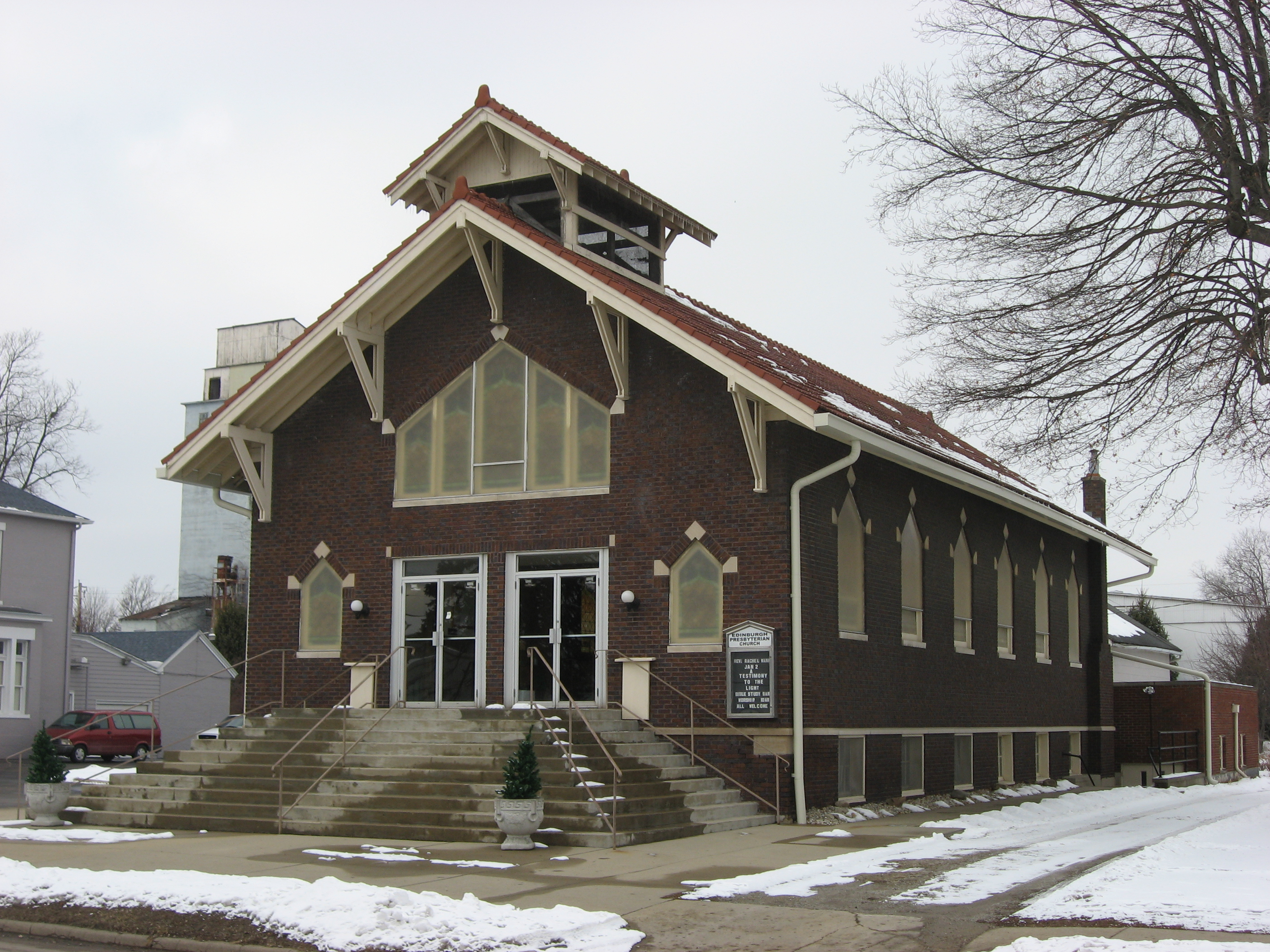
- Presbyterian church, January 2011

- Location within Indiana Location within the United States
- Location: Roughly both sides of S. Walnut St. from Thompson St. south to 507 and 514 S. Walnut, plus the 100 block of W. Campbell, Edinburgh, Indiana
- Coordinates: 39°21′16″N 85°57′35″W
- Area: 20 acres (8.1 ha)
- Architect: Toner, Jacob L.; Woodsides, Martin; Dunlap and Company
- Architectural style: Greek Revival, Italianate, Queen Anne, Romanesque, Bungalow/Craftsman
- NRHP reference No.: 11000127
- Added to NRHP: March 21, 2011

Toner Historic District is a national historic district located at Edinburgh, Indiana. The district encompasses 66 contributing buildings in a predominantly residential section of Edinburgh. It developed between about 1845 and 1959, and includes notable examples of Gothic Revival, Italianate, Queen Anne, Colonial Revival, and Bungalow / American Craftsman style architecture. The dwellings include a collection of substantial homes with high historic integrity. Notable buildings include the Edinburgh Presbyterian Church (1916), and former marble shop and weight house (c. 1880).

It was listed on the National Register of Historic Places in 2011.
