= Pleasant Pruitt =

American serial killer

- Born: c. 1840; Edinburgh, Indiana, U.S.
- Died: October 9, 1902 (aged 61–62); Indianapolis, Indiana, U.S.
- Cause of death: Self-inflicted gunshot wound
- Conviction: N/A
- Penalty: N/A

Details
- Victims: 3
- Span of crimes: 1888–1902
- Country: United States
- State: Indiana
- Date apprehended: N/A

Pleasant Pruitt (c. 1840 – October 9, 1902) was an American serial killer who murdered three subsequent wives. Pruitt killed himself after the last murder to avoid justice.

== Early life and first marriage ==
Pruitt came from an old, but wealthy Protestant family in his hometown of Edinburgh. Described by many as a man with higher than average intelligence, he was considered a respectable member of society. While still a young man, he wooed and soon married a Miss Van Meter, from Rushville, who gave birth to four children - Alice, Leslie, Ethel and Clyde (all of them later moved to Indianapolis). The family was regarded as an ordinary and happy one, with Pruitt at the helm of it.

== Murders ==
=== First wife ===
In 1888, the first Mrs. Pruitt suddenly died from poisoning. This event shocked the citizens of Edinburgh, but no suspicion was directed at Pleasant, at all. His seemingly righteous way of living prevented any investigation into the matter, leaving the people to wonder if the death was just a simple accident. Mrs. Pruitt's death remained an unsolved mystery, and Pleasant continued living as a respected and honorable man.

=== Second wife ===
A year or two after her death, Pleasant met and married Naomi Huffman. The Pruitt household seemed to have returned to its previous happy state, but not for long. In 1896, the Edinburgh community was shocked yet again, when it was learned that Pleasant had accidentally killed his wife. The grieving farmer explained that he had been cleaning and loading his shotgun in the rear of the house, when the weapon accidentally fired. Naomi, who was in the summer kitchen, was struck and instantaneously killed.

This claim did not satisfy the neighbors, who recalled the first wife's death, and demanded that the authorities start an official investigation into the matter. Pruitt was arrested, but since there was no clear motive, and the fact that the couple lived happily together, the jury considered that the two deaths were mere strange coincidences. Pleasant was let go, but the trial had cost him much of his wealth. He began to travel extensively, eventually meeting his soon-to-be-third-wife, Winnie Berry, in Iowa City. The couple stayed there for some years, before moving to Indianapolis and settling on East Ohio Street, along with Winnie's 14-year-old son from a previous marriage, Jesse.

=== Third wife and suicide ===
Eventually, Pleasant was left without money, so his wife suggested that they turn their home into a boarding house. The business was going well, but Pruitt, who barely worked, began growing more and more melancholic. His worsening behavior resulted in him having problems with how the house was managed, which caused some boarders to leave, and thus, quarrels between him and his wife began. No longer feeling love towards her, Pleasant began plotting to kill her.

On October 9, 1902, not long after Jesse left to go to school and after the same old arguing was going on, Winnie went down to the basement to work over a washtub. Pleasant purportedly followed her down, only to renew their quarreling. In the heat of the moment, he attacked his wife. Grabbing a nearby knife, Pleasant stabbed her twice to the heart, while still hitting her in the face.

Winnie's face was horribly disfigured, with both her eyes punched out of their eyesockets. Pruitt left the basement, with the likely intention to escape immediately. For an unknown reason, he returned to the basement with a fully loaded .38 bulldog revolver, and subsequently committed suicide by shooting himself in the head, his body falling on top of his deceased wife.

== Discovery and aftermath ==
At around 4:30 in the afternoon, Jesse Berry returned from school. When he entered the house, he shouted down the hall to notify his mom that he had returned, but with no response. Puzzled, he went upstairs to continue his search, where one of the roomers, Nicholas Yeager, told him that his mother had been in the basement since the early morning, washing clothes. Jesse then went down to the cellar, yelling out for his mother one last time before entering.

Receiving no response yet again, he went down the stairs into the dark basement. After only making a few steps, he stumbled into the feet of his stepfather, and when he struck a match, he saw that his face was all bloodied. Terrified, he ran up the stairs and out the house to the police station. He came across Policemen Morgan and Simon, who bicycled to the house under Jesse's guidance.

When Morgan entered the cellar and struck a match, he instantly realised that it was a case of murder–suicide. He then returned to the young boy, telling him that a serious accident had occurred, only for the young Jesse to tell him that he knew this was coming and prayed that they were peaceful in Heaven now. The house was quickly investigated and the roomers questioned, with the police unveiling that the Pruitt's constant arguing was the likely motive behind the crime.

A few weeks after the whole story, a lawsuit was filed by Frank McCray, administrator of Winnie's estate, versus Otho C. George, administrator of Pleasant's estate. The case was over who would receive the properties, as they could not be given to a young man like Jesse, and the two men argued over who lived there longer: the victim or the perpetrator. The outcome of this lawsuit is, at present, unknown.

== See also ==
- List of serial killers in the United States
