= Pigeon Creek (Indiana) =

Coordinates: 37°58′38″N 87°35′21″W

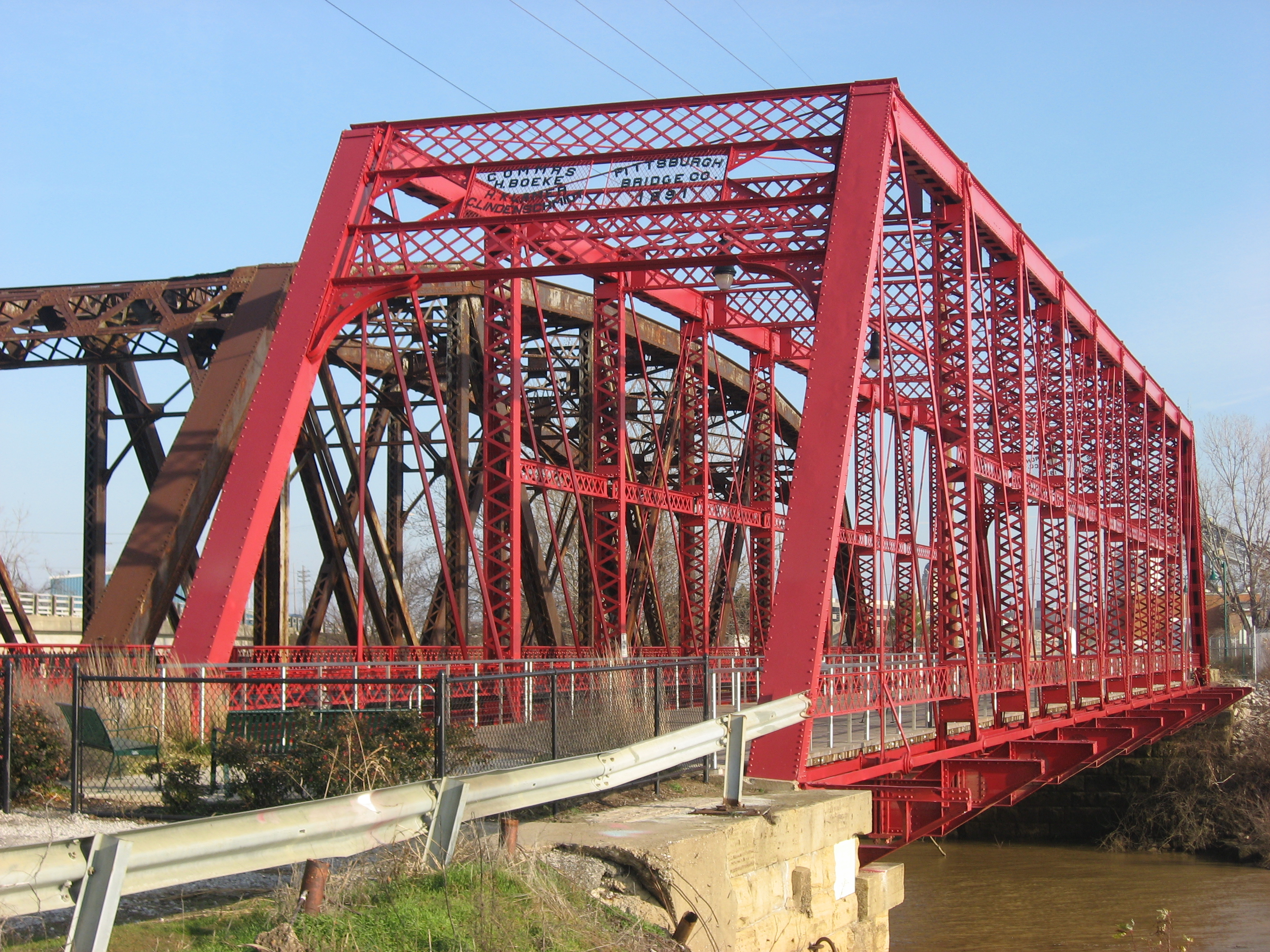
- The Ohio Street Bridge over Pigeon Creek where it empties into the Ohio River at Evansville, Indiana

Location
- Country: US
- State: Indiana

Physical characteristics
- Source
  - location: Indiana, US
- Mouth
  - location: Evansville, Indiana, US
- Length: 76.4 km (47.5 mi)
- Basin size: 836 km^{2} (323 sq mi)
- Discharge
  - location: Ohio River

Pigeon Creek is a tributary of the Ohio River in southwestern Indiana. It runs approximately 47.5 miles (76.4 km) from its eastern source in rural Gibson County near Princeton and its western source near Owensville. The forks merge southeast of Fort Branch, and from there it heads southeast under its new northern crossing of Interstate 69 towards Warrick County near Lynnville. From there it heads south, under Interstate 64, where it is signed as the "Wabash and Erie Canal" instead of as Pigeon Creek. The creek becomes larger as the Little and Big Bluegrass Creeks empty into it in western Warrick County. The larger creek then turns west crossing into Vanderburgh County under its older former Interstate 164 crossing, now also part of Interstate 69, just north of Evansville's East Side. The creek has a few more tributaries join as it first heads west through Evansville's East and North Sides then south between Downtown Evansville and Westside Evansville, where it empties into the Ohio River.

== See also ==
- List of rivers of Indiana
