= List of rivers of Indiana =

This is a list of rivers in Indiana (U.S. state).

== By tributary ==
=== Lake Erie ===
- Maumee River
  - St. Marys River
  - St. Joseph River
    - Cedar Creek
      - Little Cedar Creek
      - Willow Creek
    - Fish Creek

=== Lake Michigan ===
- St. Joseph River (Lake Michigan)
  - Elkhart River
  - Little Elkhart River
  - Pigeon River
  - Fawn River
- Galena River, becomes the Galien River in Michigan
- Trail Creek
- East Arm Little Calumet River
  - Salt Creek
- Grand Calumet River (through Indiana Harbor and Ship Canal and the Calumet River in Illinois)
- Little Calumet River (through Indiana Harbor and Ship Canal and the Calumet River in Illinois)
  - Deep River

=== Mississippi River ===
- Ohio River
  - Wabash River
    - Black River
    - Bonpas Creek
    - Patoka River
    - White River
      - Eagle Creek
        - Little Eagle Creek
      - East Fork White River
        - Lost River
        - Muscatatuck River
          - Vernon Fork Muscatatuck River
        - Flatrock River
          - Little Flatrock River
          - Conns Creek
        - Driftwood River
          - Big Blue River
            - Little Blue River
          - Sugar Creek (Driftwood River tributary)
        - Salt Creek (White River tributary)
          - Clear Creek (Salt Creek)
            - Jackson Creek
      - Eel River
      - White Lick Creek
      - Fall Creek
    - Sugar Creek (Wabash River tributary), also called Sugar River, Rock River
    - Little Vermilion River
    - Vermilion River
    - Big Pine Creek
    - Wildcat Creek
    - Tippecanoe River
      - Redinger Ditch
    - Eel River
    - Mississinewa River
    - Salamonie River
    - Little River, also called Little Wabash River
  - Crooked Creek
  - Pigeon Creek, also called Pigeon River
    - Little Pigeon Creek, also called Little Pigeon River
  - Anderson River
  - Little Blue River
  - Blue River
  - Silver Creek
  - Fourteen Mile Creek
  - Great Miami River
    - Whitewater River
    - Stillwater River (OH)
      - Greenville Creek
- Illinois River (IL)
  - Kankakee River
    - Iroquois River
    - Yellow River
    - Little Kankakee River

== Alphabetically ==
- Anderson River
- Big Blue River
- Big Pine Creek
- Black River (Owensville - New Harmony)
- Blue River
- Bonpas Creek ^{1}
- Cedar Creek
- Conns Creek
- Deep River
- Driftwood River
- East Arm Little Calumet River
- East Fork White River
- Eel River (Wabash River tributary) (northern Indiana)
- Eel River (White River tributary) (southern Indiana)
- Elkhart River
- Fall Creek
- Fawn River
- Flatrock Creek
- Flatrock River
- Fourteen Mile Creek
- Galena River
- Grand Calumet River
- Great Miami River
- Greenville Creek
- Iroquois River
- Jackson Creek (Monroe County)
- Kankakee River
- Little Blue River (Perry and Crawford counties)
- Little Blue River (Shelby, Rush and Henry counties)
- Little Calumet River
- Little Elkhart River
- Little Flatrock River
- Little Kankakee River
- Little Pigeon Creek
- Little River, also called Little Wabash River
- Little Vermilion River
- Lost River
- Maumee River
- Mill Creek (Jackson County, Indiana)
- Mississinewa River
- Muscatatuck River
- Ohio River
- Patoka River
- Pigeon Creek, also called Pigeon River
- Pigeon River
- Redinger Ditch
- St. Joseph River (Lake Michigan)
- St. Joseph River (Maumee River tributary)
- St. Marys River
- Salamonie River
- Salt Creek (Little Calumet River tributary)
- Salt Creek (White River tributary)
- Sand River
- Silver Creek
- Sugar Creek (Driftwood River tributary)
- Sugar Creek (Wabash River tributary), also called Sugar Creek, Rock River
- Tippecanoe River
- Trail Creek
- Vermilion River
- Vernon Fork Muscatatuck River
- Wabash River
- White Lick Creek
- White River
- Whitewater River
- Wildcat Creek
- Yellow River
- Youngs Creek (Johnson County, Indiana)
- Youngs Creek (Orange County, Indiana)

1 Nominally in Illinois, Bonpas creek is now along Indiana-Illinois border due to a shift in the course of the Wabash River.

== See also ==
- List of rivers in the United States
- Geography of Indiana
