= Youngs Creek (Stinson Creek tributary) =

Stream in the U.S. state of Missouri

Youngs Creek is a stream in Callaway County in the U.S. state of Missouri. It is a tributary of Stinson Creek. The stream headwaters arise southwest of Fulton at 38°50′20″N 91°59′56″W and it flows southeast crossing under U.S. Route 54 and Missouri Route C northwest of Hams Prairie where its course turns north to its confluence with Stinson Creek southeast of Fulton at 38°48′43″N 91°54′56″W at an elevation of 614 feet.

Youngs Creek was named after Judge Ben Young, an early settler.

== See also ==
- List of rivers of Missouri
