= Youngs Creek (Johnson County, Indiana) =

Stream in Johnson County, Indiana, U.S.

Coordinates: 39°23′50″N 86°00′32″W

Youngs Creek is a stream in Johnson County, Indiana, in the United States.

It was named for Joseph Young, who owned land in the area in the 1820s.

== See also ==
- List of rivers of Indiana
