= Edinburgh, Indiana =

Town in Indiana, United States

- Town
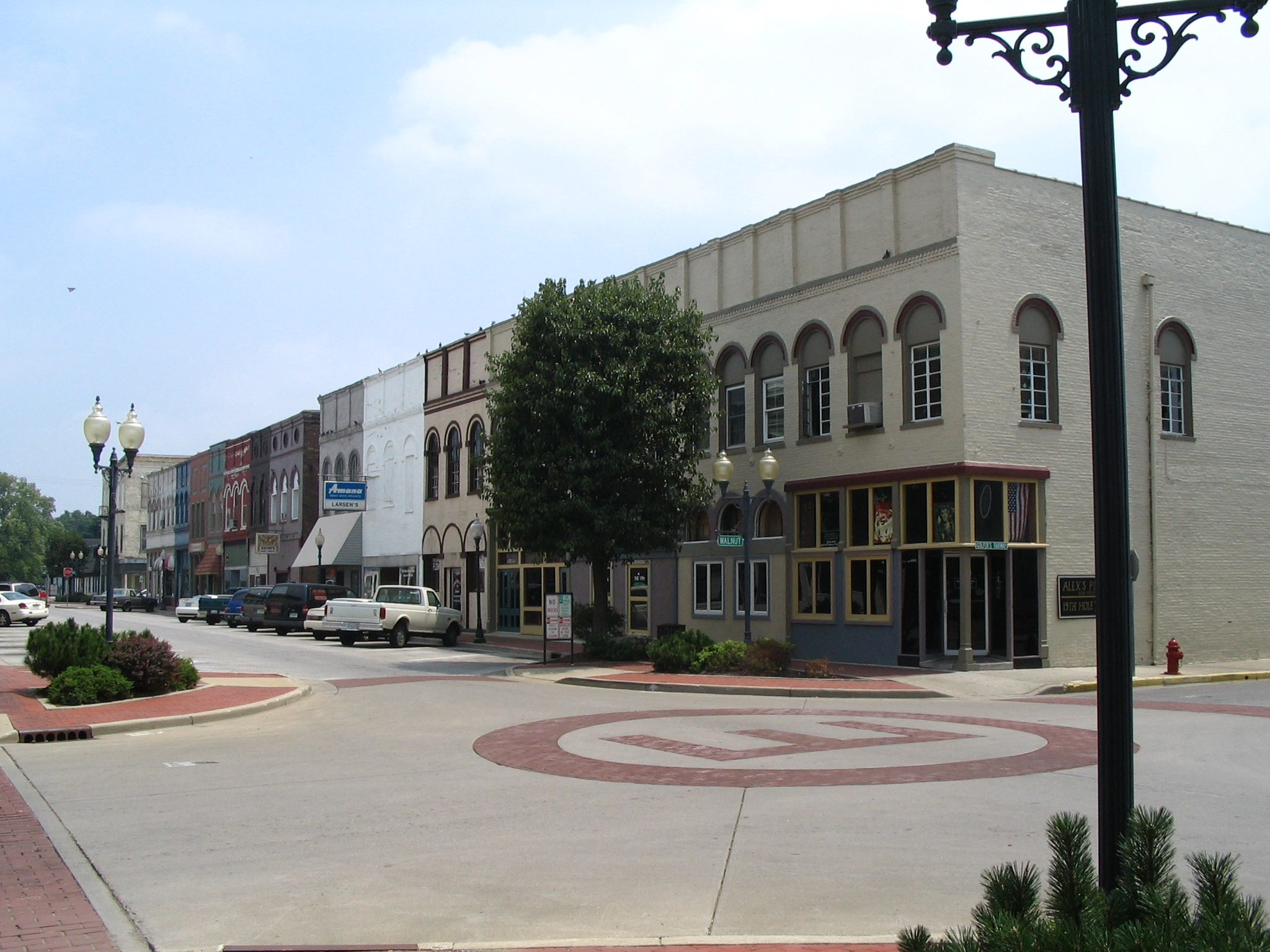
- Downtown Edinburgh, looking East

- Logo
- Nickname: The Burgh
- Location of Edinburgh in Bartholomew County and Johnson County and Shelby County, Indiana.
- Coordinates: 39°21′03″N 85°57′45″W
- Country: United States
- State: Indiana
- Counties: Johnson, Bartholomew, Shelby
- Townships: Blue River, German, Jackson
- Established: 1822
- Incorporated (town): 1853

Government

Area
  - Total: 3.10 sq mi (8.04 km^{2})
  - Land: 3.10 sq mi (8.04 km^{2})
  - Water: 0 sq mi (0.00 km^{2})
- Elevation: 669 ft (204 m)

Population (2020)
  - Total: 4,435
  - Density: 1,428.0/sq mi (551.37/km^{2})
- Time zone: UTC−5 (Eastern (EST))
  - Summer (DST): UTC−5 (EST)
- ZIP code: 46124
- Area code: 812
- FIPS code: 18-20404
- GNIS feature ID: 2396921
- Website: edinburgh.in.us

Edinburgh (/ˈɛdɪnbɜːrɡ/) is a town in Johnson, Bartholomew, and Shelby counties in the U.S. state of Indiana. The population was 4,435 at the 2020 census. It is part of the Columbus, Indiana metropolitan statistical area. Edinburgh was named in honor of Edinburgh, Scotland and for many years was pronounced the same way.

Edinburgh is the home of Camp Atterbury, a National Guard training facility. The Big Blue River and Sugar Creek join to form the Driftwood River 1 mi (1.6 km) west of Edinburgh.

== History ==
Edinburgh was laid out in about 1822. A founder of the town being a native of Scotland may have caused the name Edinburgh to be selected. The Edinburgh post office has been in operation since 1823. Edinburgh was incorporated as a town in 1853. Early in its history it was sometimes referred to as the town of Edinburg.

Edinburgh Commercial Historic District, South Walnut Street Historic District, and Toner Historic District are listed on the National Register of Historic Places.

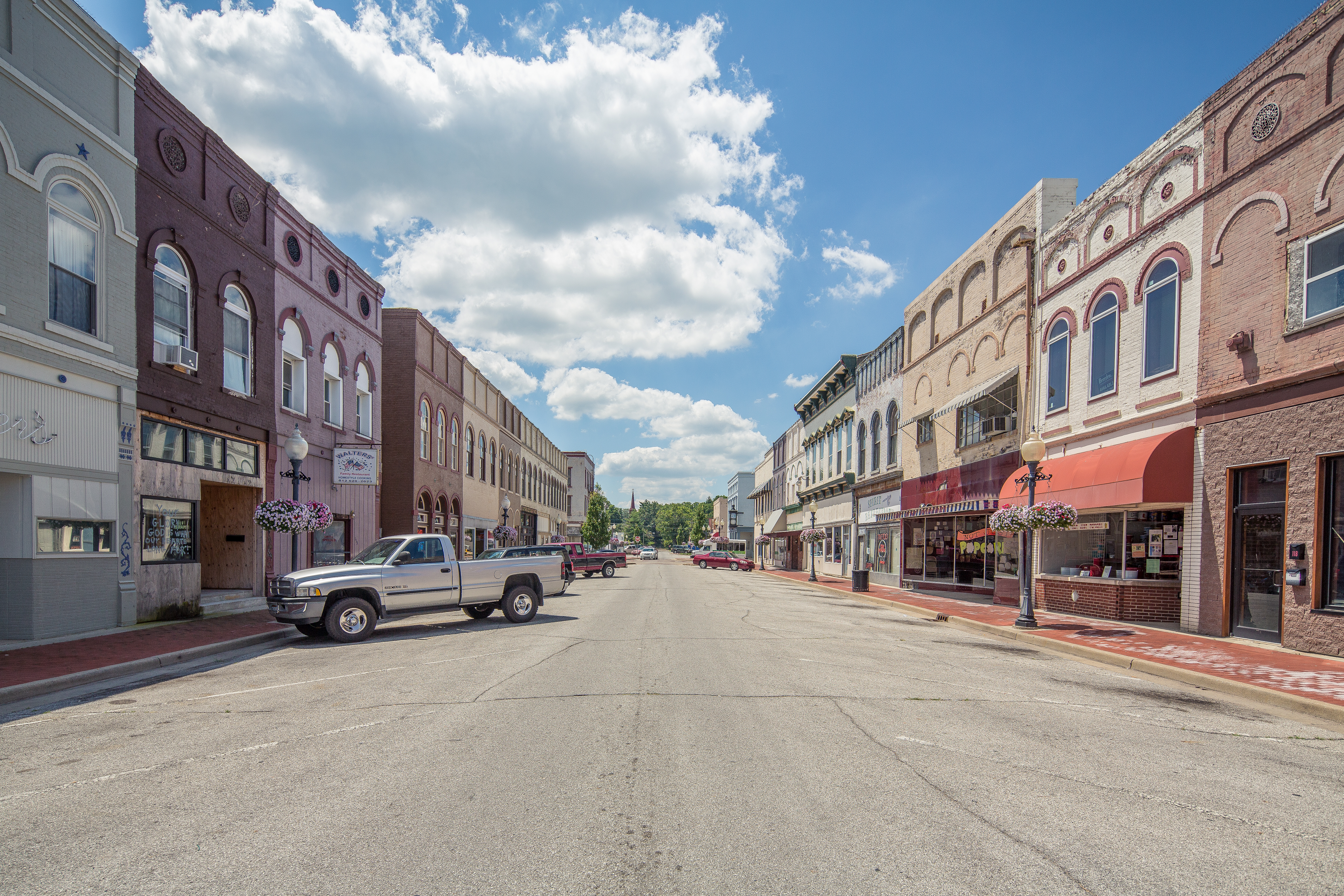
Photo from Small Town Indiana photo survey.

=== June 3, 2008, Tornado ===
Severe thunderstorms formed rapidly across Central Indiana on the evening of June 3, 2008. These storms began to rotate and produced multiple tornadoes. One of these tornadoes traveled across northern sections of Brown County and southern sections of Johnson County. This tornado did considerable damage to the Camp Atterbury facility. The tornado exited Camp Atterbury and crossed US 31, entering the town of Edinburgh. Several buildings and countless trees and power lines were damaged as the tornado moved roughly parallel with Indiana 252. The tornado lifted near Interstate 65. The National Weather Service rated this damaging event as an EF-2 tornado.

=== June 7, 2008, Flood ===
Several bouts of severe thunderstorm activity and heavy rainfall affected the Edinburgh area in early June 2008. The Big Blue River and Sugar Creek overflowed their banks as a result of this activity. However, the worst of the weather was to come. A line of severe thunderstorms moved across Central Indiana on the evening of June 6, 2008. These storms began to move south out of Edinburgh, weakening as daylight was lost. However, strong surface winds began to interact with a leftover outflow boundary from the earlier severe activity. As a result, new thunderstorm activity began to blossom and move to the east. This interaction produced what is known as a training effect, with thunderstorm after thunderstorm moving over the same area.

The first rainfall began to fall in Edinburgh at approximately 9:00 PM on the evening of June 6. The torrential rain would last until 12:00 PM on June 7. An unofficial rainfall total of 10.71 inches (272 mm) was measured in Edinburgh. Official National Weather Service rainfall totals across Central Indiana during this period ranged from 3.09 inches (78 mm) to 9.85 inches (250 mm). This water had no place to go as it struck the already saturated grounds, so runoff was extremely high. The Big Blue River and Sugar Creek began to rise rapidly. Runoff quickly flooded agricultural areas and much of this water made its way into several subdivisions in Edinburgh. Many homes were flooded with several feet of water. US 31, SR 252, and Interstate 65 were all flooded at the height of the flood, essentially cutting Edinburgh off from surrounding areas.

== Geography ==
According to the 2010 census, Edinburgh has a total area of 3.11 square miles (8.05 km^{2}), all land.

== Demographics ==
Historical population
Census	Pop.	Note	%±
1860	1,100		—
1870	1,799		63.5%
1880	1,814		0.8%
1890	2,031		12.0%
1900	1,820		−10.4%
1910	2,040		12.1%
1920	2,376		16.5%
1930	2,209		−7.0%
1940	2,466		11.6%
1950	3,283		33.1%
1960	3,664		11.6%
1970	5,079		38.6%
1980	4,856		−4.4%
1990	4,536		−6.6%
2000	4,505		−0.7%
2010	4,480		−0.6%
2020	4,435		−1.0%
U.S. Decennial Census

=== 2020 census ===
As of the 2020 census, Edinburgh had a population of 4,435. The median age was 40.0 years. 23.3% of residents were under the age of 18 and 16.7% of residents were 65 years of age or older. For every 100 females there were 101.6 males, and for every 100 females age 18 and over there were 98.5 males age 18 and over.

97.1% of residents lived in urban areas, while 2.9% lived in rural areas.

There were 1,813 households in Edinburgh, of which 29.5% had children under the age of 18 living in them. Of all households, 43.3% were married-couple households, 20.9% were households with a male householder and no spouse or partner present, and 27.6% were households with a female householder and no spouse or partner present. About 27.6% of all households were made up of individuals and 11.5% had someone living alone who was 65 years of age or older.

There were 1,962 housing units, of which 7.6% were vacant. The homeowner vacancy rate was 1.5% and the rental vacancy rate was 5.4%.

Racial composition as of the 2020 census
Race	Number	Percent
White	4,091	92.2%
Black or African American	34	0.8%
American Indian and Alaska Native	10	0.2%
Asian	6	0.1%
Native Hawaiian and Other Pacific Islander	0	0.0%
Some other race	109	2.5%
Two or more races	185	4.2%
Hispanic or Latino (of any race)	237	5.3%

=== 2010 census ===
As of the census of 2010, there were 4,480 people, 1,760 households and 1,180 families living in the town. The population density was 1,440.5 inhabitants per square mile (556.2/km^{2}). There were 1,940 housing units at an average density of 623.8 per square mile (240.9/km^{2}). The racial makeup of the town was 95.2% White, 0.3% African American, 0.2% Native American, 0.1% Asian, 3.0% from other races, and 1.1% from two or more races. Hispanic or Latino of any race were 5.5% of the population.

There were 1,760 households, of which 34.0% had children under the age of 18 living with them, 45.5% were married couples living together, 14.4% had a female householder with no husband present, 7.2% had a male householder with no wife present, and 33.0% were non-families. 26.9% of all households were made up of individuals, and 10.7% had someone living alone who was 65 years of age or older. The average household size was 2.55 and the average family size was 3.03.

The median age in the town was 38.3 years. 24.5% of residents were under the age of 18; 10% were between the ages of 18 and 24; 25.8% were from 25 to 44; 27.8% were from 45 to 64; and 12% were 65 years of age or older. The gender makeup of the town was 49.9% male and 50.1% female.

=== 2000 census ===
As of the census of 2000, there were 4,505 people, 1,789 households, and 1,207 families living in the town. The population density was 1,584.8 inhabitants per square mile (611.9/km^{2}). There were 1,894 housing units at an average density of 666.3 per square mile (257.3/km^{2}). The racial makeup of the town was 99.18% White, 0.13% African American, 0.13% Native American, 0.07% Asian, 0.02% Pacific Islander, 0.22% from other races, and 0.24% from two or more races. Hispanic or Latino of any race were 1.07% of the population.

There were 1,789 households, out of which 33.4% had children under the age of 18 living with them, 51.7% were married couples living together, 11.2% had a female householder with no husband present, and 32.5% were non-families. 27.8% of all households were made up of individuals, and 9.2% had someone living alone who was 65 years of age or older. The average household size was 2.52 and the average family size was 3.07.

In the town, the population was spread out, with 27.4% under the age of 18, 8.5% from 18 to 24, 30.8% from 25 to 44, 22.7% from 45 to 64, and 10.5% who were 65 years of age or older. The median age was 35 years. For every 100 females, there were 97.8 males. For every 100 females age 18 and over, there were 96.6 males.

The median income for a household in the town was $32,170, and the median income for a family was $40,511. Males had a median income of $27,445 versus $24,625 for females. The per capita income for the town was $14,486. About 8.3% of families and 12.4% of the population were below the poverty line, including 15.6% of those under age 18 and 11.3% of those age 65 or over.

== Education ==
Residents are zoned to the Edinburgh Community School Corporation.

The town has a lending library, the Edinburgh Wright-Hageman Public Library.

== Notable people ==
- J. Gregory Bruce (1897–1985), Judge of the United States Tax Court.
- Grant Wright Christian (1911–1989), artist.
- Leonard Hackney (1855–1899), Justice of the Indiana Supreme Court.
- Charles Morse Huffer (1894–1981), astronomer.
- Christy Mack (1992–present), pornographic actress.
- Pleasant Pruitt (1840–1902), serial killer.

== See also ==
- Burgh
