= Youngs Creek (Orange County, Indiana) =

Coordinates: 38°26′00″N 86°32′00″W

Location
- Country: United States
- State: Indiana
- County: Orange County

Youngs Creek is a stream in Orange County, in the U.S. state of Indiana.

Youngs Creek was named for William Young, a pioneer who settled near the creek about 1816.

== See also ==
- List of rivers of Indiana
