= White River (Indiana) =

White River - Indiana Wapahani
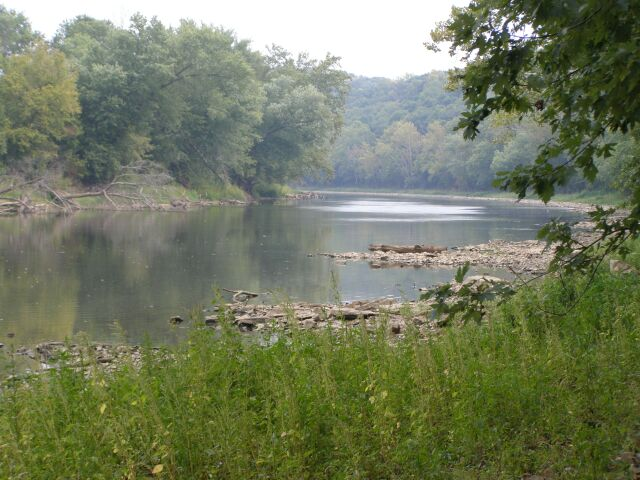
- White River in Lawrence County

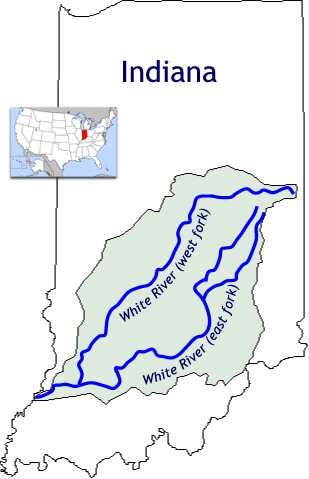
- The forks of the White River are highlighted in dark blue. The sky-blue area is the basin watershed.

Location
- Country: United States
- State: Indiana

Physical characteristics
- Source
  - location: Washington Township (West Fork); Stoney Creek Township (East Fork)
  - coordinates: 40.0794906°N 84.9327413°W (West Fork); 40.038361°N 85.267389°W (East Fork)
- 2nd source
  - location: Veale Township
  - coordinates: 38.546611°N 87.241556°W
- Mouth: Wabash River
  - location: Gibson County, Indiana, opposite Mount Carmel, Illinois
  - coordinates: 38.4142134°N 87.7425280°W
- Length: 362 mi (583 km)
- Basin size: 5,746 sq mi (14,880 km^{2})
- Discharge
  - location: Mount Carmel, Illinois
  - average: 13,845 cu/ft. per sec.

Basin features
- Progression: Wabash → Ohio → Mississippi → Gulf of Mexico

The White River is an American two-forked river that flows through central and southern Indiana and is the main tributary to the Wabash River. Via the west fork, considered to be the main stem of the river by the U.S. Board on Geographic Names, the White River is 362 miles (583 km) long. Indiana's capital, Indianapolis, is located along the river. The two forks meet just north of Petersburg and empty into the Wabash River at Mount Carmel, Illinois.

== West Fork ==
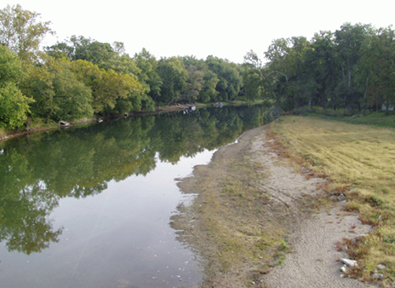
The West Fork of the White River at Fishers

The West Fork, 312 miles (502 km) long, is the main fork of the river. Federal maps refer to it simply as the White River, per a 1950 Board on Geographic Names decision. It starts south of Winchester in Randolph County at 40°04′46″N 84°55′58″W in Washington Township. The river winds through Muncie, Anderson, Noblesville, and Indianapolis before being joined by the east fork in the triad of Daviess, Knox, and Pike counties. Along the way it passes by three Indiana state parks: Mounds State Park, near Anderson; White River State Park, in downtown Indianapolis; and McCormick's Creek State Park, near Spencer. In Indianapolis the Wapahani Trail follows the eastern bank; the Miami tribe had called the river Wapahani, meaning “white sands” or waapikamiiki.

== East Fork ==
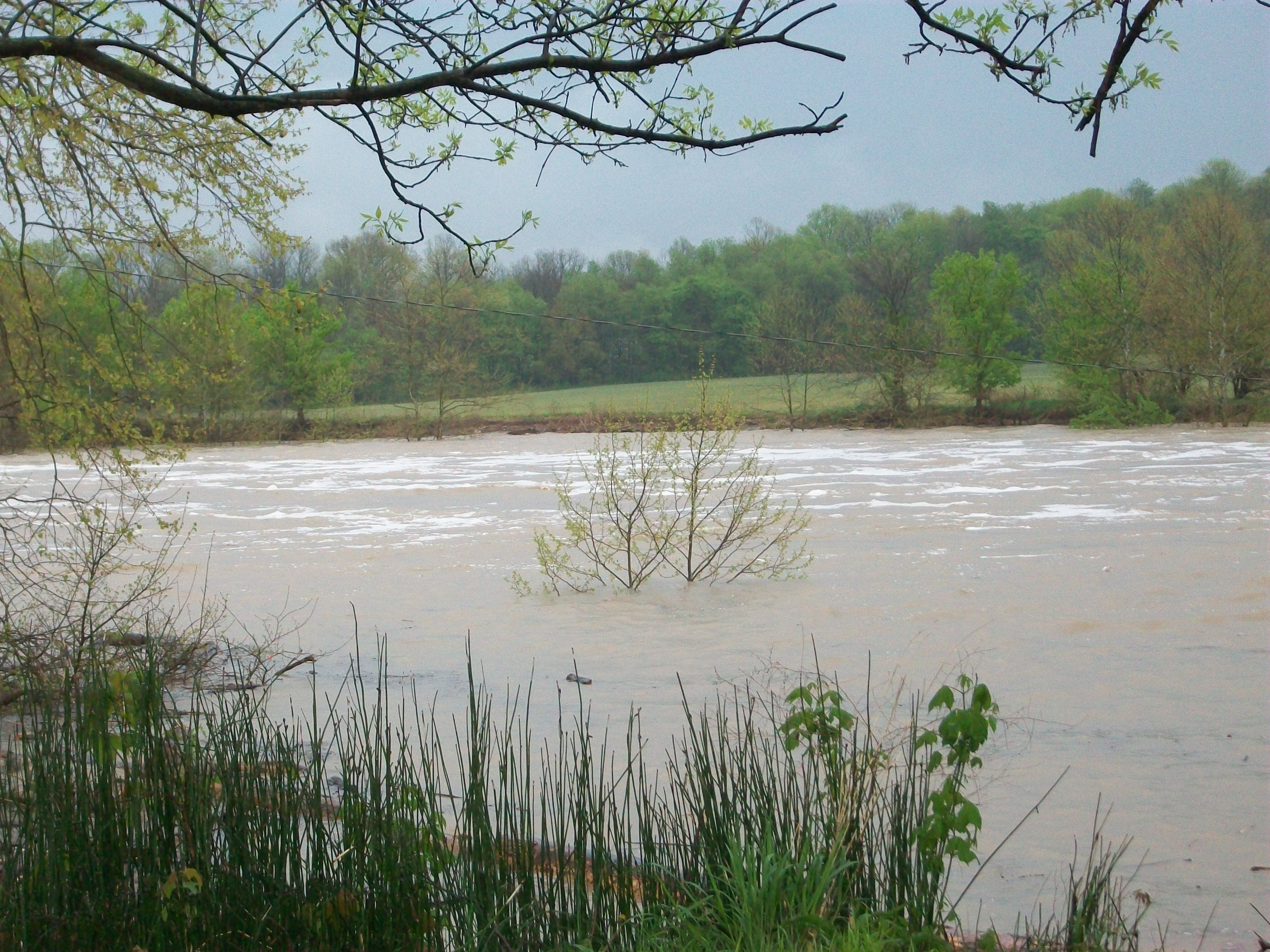
Flooding on the East Fork of the White River at Williams in April 2011

The East Fork or Aankwaahsakwa Siipiiwi in the native Miami-Illinois language starts in Columbus at the confluence of the Driftwood and Flatrock rivers. The headwaters of the main stem ("West Fork") of the White River are in fact farther east than those of the East Fork. The East Fork flows a total of 192 miles (309 km) generally southwest, passing the city of Seymour, then flowing through rugged terrain before reaching the West Fork.

The East Fork White River has an approximate discharge of 6,235 cubic feet (176.6 m^{3}) per second below the mouth of Lick Creek.

Eventually, the East Fork continues eastward to its source under different names: the "Flatrock River", the "Driftwood River", and the "Big Blue River".

== Lower river ==
Below the junction of the East Fork, the White River flows another 50 miles (80 km) between Gibson, Knox, and Pike counties before draining into the Wabash River at the Indiana–Illinois border next to Mount Carmel, Illinois, in the vicinity of where the Grand Rapids Dam and Grand Rapids Hotel used to exist. The total White River basin watershed exceeds 11,305 square miles (29,280 km^{2}).

== Recreation ==
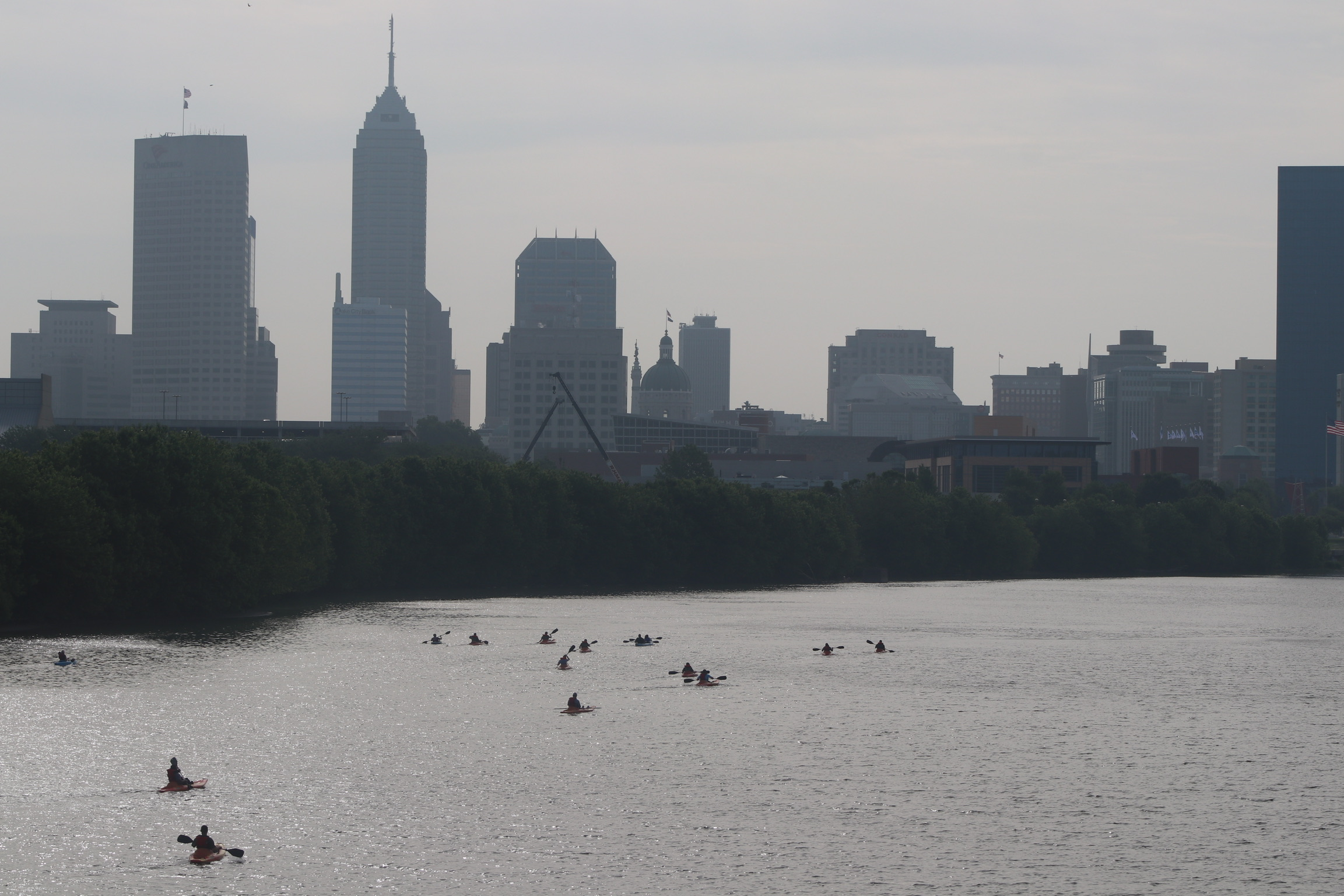
Kayakers on the river's west fork in Indianapolis, 2019

Many recreational activities take place on the White River, including fishing, kayaking, and canoeing. The White River Yacht Club is a boating club that utilizes pontoon boats, and a section of the river in northern Indianapolis has both riverside cottages and pontoon boats. The river is not deep enough in many stretches to support conventionally-keeled sailing or power boats.

== Pollution ==
In 1997, the White River was listed as one of the United States’ most threatened rivers.

Pesticides (herbicides and insecticides) are used extensively in the White River basin. Application of herbicides to corn and soybeans accounts for most of the use. The pesticides most frequently detected near the mouth of the White River during 1991–1995 were the herbicides alachlor, atrazine, cyanazine, and metolachlor.

The highest concentrations of herbicides in the river were typically found during late spring runoff following application. Generally, concentrations of alachlor have been decreasing while concentrations of acetochlor have been increasing in response to changes in the use of these herbicides in the basin.

The total amount of the commonly used herbicides transported by the river is about 1% or less of the amount applied to cropland. Insecticides commonly used in urban and agricultural areas also were found but in much lower concentrations than commonly used herbicides.

In 1999, the West Fork experienced a massive fish kill that spread for 50 miles (80 km) with an estimated loss of 4.6 million fish (187 tons). The kill was traced back to Guide Corp, an automotive parts maker in Anderson, which had discharged 10,000 US gallons (38,000 L) of the chemical HMP 2000 into the river. Guide Corp eventually reached a settlement whereby the company would pay a total of $14.2 million in fines, penalties, legal expenses, and river restoration. Many animals that had burrowed into the mud were protected from the chemical, and by March 2000, some fish were naturally returning to the affected area. The Indiana Department of Natural Resources conducted a restocking program in October. The city of Anderson announced in 2002 that it would invest millions of dollars for improvements to its sewage treatment system. Ten years after the fish kill, officials with the DNR stated that the White River was in better condition than before the environmental disaster. Stones along the bank of the river are still bleached, and are a reminder of the chemical spill.

== See also ==
- List of Indiana rivers
- Cabin Creek, Indiana
