= Indianapolis metropolitan area =

Metropolitan area in Indiana, United States

Indianapolis Metropolitan Area
- Metropolitan Statistical Area
- Indianapolis–Carmel–Greenwood, IN MSA
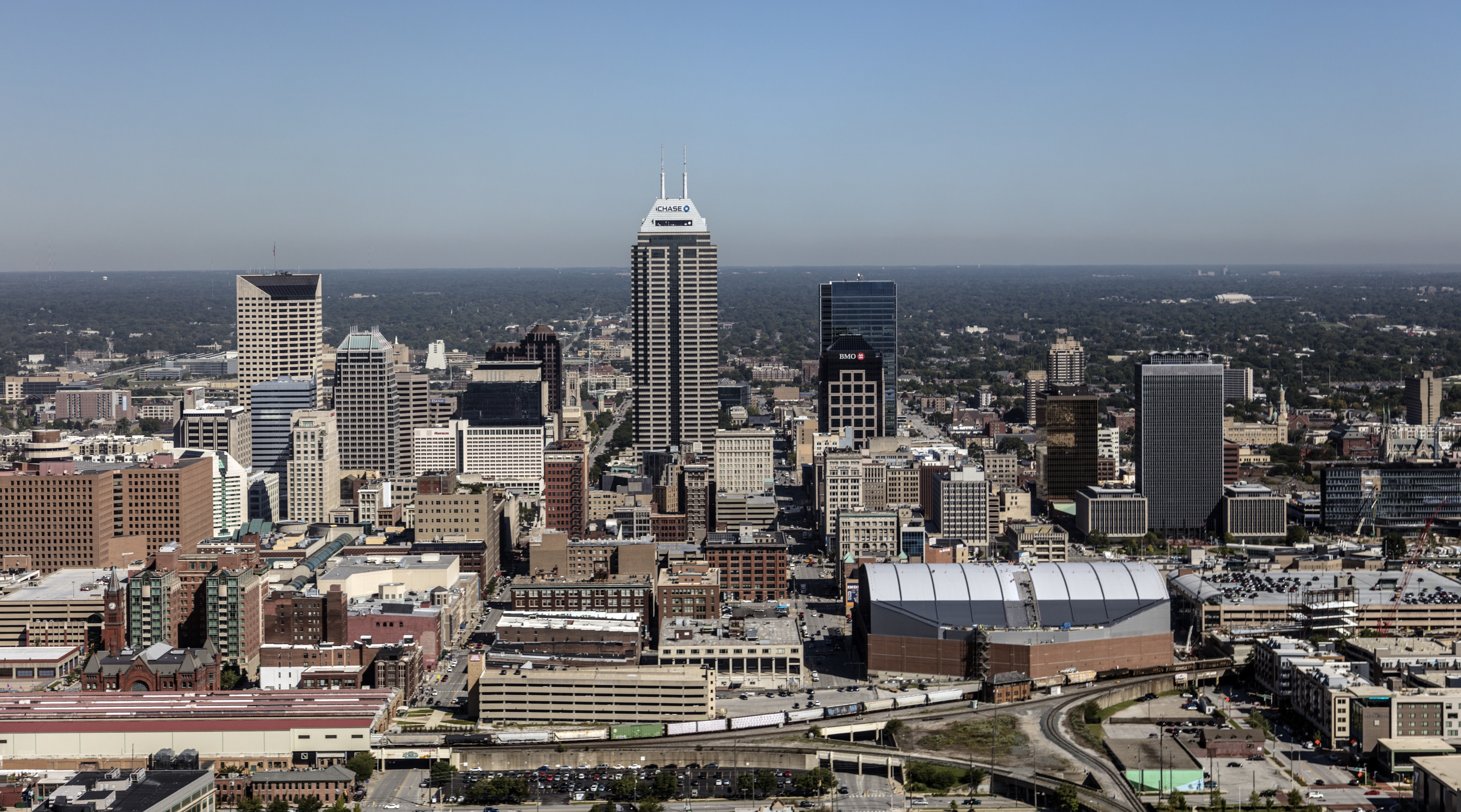
- Downtown Indianapolis
Map of Indianapolis–Carmel–Muncie, IN CSA
Indianapolis (balance)
Indianapolis–Carmel–Greenwood MSA
Muncie MSA
Columbus MSA
Kokomo MSA
New Castle μSA
Seymour μSA
Crawfordsville μSA
Greencastle μSA
Peru μSA
Greensburg μSA
- Country: United States
- State: Indiana
- Principal cities: Indianapolis (balance); Carmel; Greenwood; Anderson

Area
  - Metropolitan Statistical Area: 6,028.83 sq mi (15,614.6 km^{2})

Population (2020)
  - Urban: 1,699,881 (32nd)
  - Urban density: 2,353/sq mi (908.4/km^{2})
  - MSA: 2,111,040 (33rd)
  - CSA: 2,492,514 (28th)

GDP
  - MSA: $199.198 billion (2023)
- Time zone: UTC-5 (EST)
  - Summer (DST): UTC-4 (EDT)
- ZIP Codes: 460xx, 461xx, 462xx, 466xx, 469xx
- Area codes: 317, 463, 765, 812, 930

The Indianapolis metropolitan area is an 11-county metropolitan area in the U.S. state of Indiana. Its principal cities are Indianapolis, Carmel, Greenwood, and Anderson. Other primary cities with populations of more than 50,000 include Fishers, Noblesville, and Westfield. Located in Central Indiana, it is the largest metropolitan area entirely within Indiana and the seventh largest in the American Midwest.

There are two official metropolitan boundaries for the Indianapolis metro area: the Indianapolis–Carmel–Greenwood, IN Metropolitan Statistical Area (MSA) and the Indianapolis–Carmel–Muncie, IN Combined Statistical Area (CSA). The two regions are identical except for the addition of three metropolitan areas (Columbus, Kokomo, and Muncie) and six micropolitan statistical areas (Crawfordsville, Greencastle, Greensburg, Seymour, New Castle, and Peru) to the Indianapolis–Carmel–Muncie CSA that are not included in the Indianapolis–Carmel–Greenwood MSA. The population of the MSA was 2,111,040 and the population of the CSA was 2,457,286 as of the 2020 Census.

The Indianapolis metropolitan area is a major center for agribusiness, distribution and logistics, life sciences, manufacturing, and motorsports. In 2021, the gross domestic product of the Indianapolis metropolitan area was (USD) $162.1 billion, among the 30 largest metropolitan economies in the U.S. In 2023, the Indianapolis metropolitan area was home to three Fortune 500 companies and six Fortune 1000 companies. The metropolitan area is home to several higher education institutions, including Anderson University, Butler University, Franklin College, Indiana University Indianapolis, Purdue University in Indianapolis, Marian University, and the University of Indianapolis, among others. Ivy Tech Community College has several campuses throughout the region.

== Indianapolis–Carmel–Greenwood, IN Metropolitan Statistical Area ==
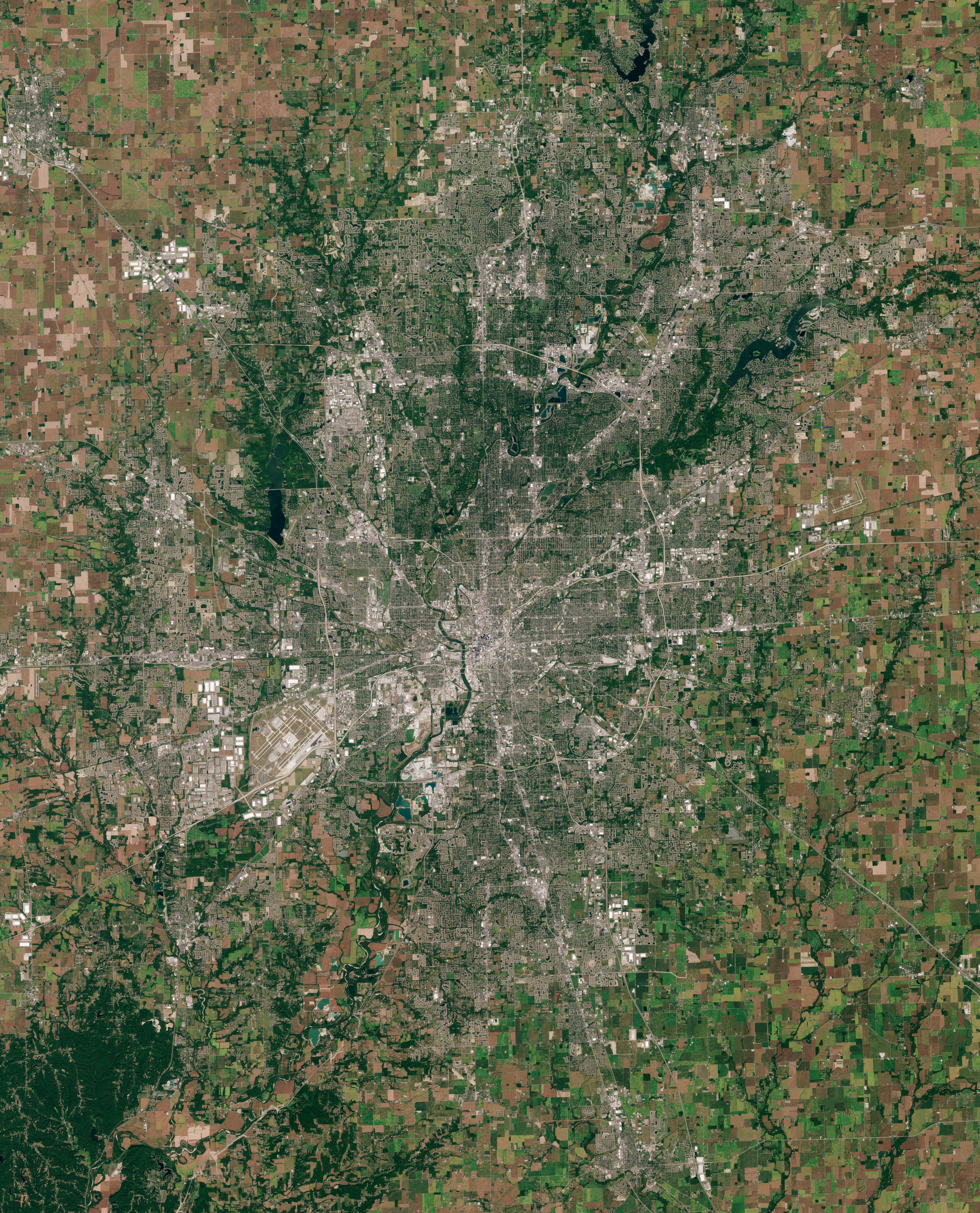
A satellite image of the Indianapolis metropolitan area

Historical population
Census	Pop.	Note	%±
1900	197,227		—
1910	263,661		33.7%
1920	348,061		32.0%
1930	422,666		21.4%
1940	460,926		9.1%
1950	551,777		19.7%
1960	976,426		77.0%
1970	1,145,871		17.4%
1980	1,208,115		5.4%
1990	1,294,217		7.1%
2000	1,525,104		17.8%
2010	1,887,877		23.8%
2020	2,111,040		11.8%
2024 (est.)	2,174,833		3.0%
data source:

In the 2020 Census, there were 2,111,040 people residing in the MSA. The racial demographics were 69.6% White, 15.0% Black or African-American, 0.4% American Indian or Alaska Native, 3.9% Asian, 4.5% Other and 6.6% Two or More Races. 8.4% of the population were Hispanic or Latino.

=== Counties ===
County	Seat	2025 estimate	2020 Census	Change	Area	Density
Marion	Indianapolis	992,196	977,203	+1.53%	403.01 sq mi (1,043.8 km^{2})	2,462/sq mi (951/km^{2})
Hamilton	Noblesville	387,036	347,467	+11.39%	402.44 sq mi (1,042.3 km^{2})	962/sq mi (371/km^{2})
Hendricks	Danville	193,510	174,788	+10.71%	408.78 sq mi (1,058.7 km^{2})	473/sq mi (183/km^{2})
Johnson	Franklin	174,262	161,765	+7.73%	321.79 sq mi (833.4 km^{2})	542/sq mi (209/km^{2})
Madison	Anderson	135,088	130,129	+3.81%	452.90 sq mi (1,173.0 km^{2})	298/sq mi (115/km^{2})
Hancock	Greenfield	90,969	79,840	+13.94%	307.02 sq mi (795.2 km^{2})	296/sq mi (114/km^{2})
Boone	Lebanon	80,689	70,812	+13.95%	423.25 sq mi (1,096.2 km^{2})	191/sq mi (74/km^{2})
Morgan	Martinsville	74,967	71,780	+4.44%	409.43 sq mi (1,060.4 km^{2})	183/sq mi (71/km^{2})
Shelby	Shelbyville	45,882	45,055	+1.84%	412.76 sq mi (1,069.0 km^{2})	111/sq mi (43/km^{2})
Brown	Nashville	15,777	15,475	+1.95%	316.22 sq mi (819.0 km^{2})	50/sq mi (19/km^{2})
Tipton	Tipton	15,319	15,359	−0.26%	260.57 sq mi (674.9 km^{2})	59/sq mi (23/km^{2})
Total		2,205,695	2,089,653	+5.55%	4,118.17 sq mi (10,666.0 km^{2})	536/sq mi (207/km^{2})

=== Municipalities with more than 100,000 inhabitants ===
- Indianapolis – Pop: 887,642 (2020)
- Fishers – Pop: 101,171 (2021)
- Carmel – Pop: 100,777 (2021)

=== Municipalities with 50,000 to 100,000 inhabitants ===
- Noblesville – Pop: 70,926 (2021)
- Greenwood – Pop: 64,918 (2021)
- Anderson – Pop: 55,130
- Westfield – Pop: 50,630 (2021)

=== Municipalities with 10,000 to 50,000 inhabitants ===
- Lawrence – Pop: 47,866
- Plainfield – Pop: 35,592 (2021)
- Zionsville – Pop: 31,702 (2021)
- Brownsburg – Pop: 30,068 (2021)
- Franklin – Pop: 25,437 (2021)
- Greenfield – Pop: 24,009 (2021)
- Avon – Pop: 22,860 (2021)
- Shelbyville – Pop: 19,048
- Lebanon – Pop: 16,840 (2021)
- Beech Grove – Pop: 14,740
- Speedway – Pop: 12,102
- Martinsville – Pop: 11,669
- Whitestown – Pop: 11,093 (2021)
- Danville – Pop: 10,758 (2021)
- Bargersville – Pop: 10,239 (2021)

=== Municipalities with 1,000 to 10,000 inhabitants ===
- Mooresville – Pop: 9,576
- McCordsville – Pop: 9,524 (2021)
- Elwood – Pop: 8,480
- Cumberland – Pop: 6,182 (2021)
- New Whiteland – Pop: 5,593 (2021)
- Tipton – Pop: 5,275 (2020)
- Alexandria – Pop: 5,067
- Cicero – Pop: 4,891
- Edinburgh – Pop: 4,533
- Whiteland – Pop: 4,303
- Pendleton – Pop: 4,212
- Fortville – Pop: 3,953
- Pittsboro – Pop: 3,188
- Sheridan – Pop: 2,893
- Chesterfield – Pop: 2,504
- Ingalls – Pop: 2,390
- New Palestine – Pop: 2,105
- Lapel – Pop: 2,051
- Edgewood – Pop: 1,885
- Frankton – Pop: 1,831
- Southport – Pop: 1,753
- Arcadia – Pop: 1,680
- Meridian Hills – Pop: 1,673
- Brooklyn – Pop: 1,604
- Warren Park – Pop: 1,531
- Thorntown – Pop: 1,484
- Clermont – Pop: 1,402
- Monrovia – Pop: 1,354
- Morristown – Pop: 1,326
- Princes Lakes – Pop: 1,326
- Trafalgar – Pop: 1,145
- Nashville – Pop: 1,076
- St. Paul – Pop: 1,052
- Clayton – Pop: 1,001

=== Municipalities with fewer than 1,000 inhabitants ===
- Summitville – Pop: 991
- Morgantown – Pop: 988
- Jamestown – Pop: 939
- Shirley – Pop: 828
- Atlanta – Pop: 740
- Homecroft – Pop: 740
- Windfall – Pop: 696
- Paragon – Pop: 662
- Rocky Ripple – Pop: 625
- Sharpsville – Pop: 553
- Coatesville – Pop: 542
- North Salem – Pop: 525
- Markleville – Pop: 522
- Advance – Pop: 509
- Lizton – Pop: 497
- Wilkinson – Pop: 451
- Williams Creek – Pop: 419
- Amo – Pop: 413
- Orestes – Pop: 411
- Stilesville – Pop: 326
- Fairland – Pop: 316
- Kempton – Pop: 288 (2020)
- Wynnedale – Pop: 238
- Spring Lake – Pop: 218
- Ulen – Pop: 124
- Spring Hill – Pop: 101
- Bethany – Pop: 81
- Country Club Heights – Pop: 78
- Woodlawn Heights – Pop: 78
- Crows Nest – Pop: 75
- North Crows Nest – Pop: 46
- River Forest – Pop: 22

== Indianapolis–Carmel–Muncie, IN Combined Statistical Area ==
As of 2023, the Indianapolis–Carmel–Muncie, IN Combined Statistical Area (CSA) consists of four metropolitan statistical areas (MSAs) and six micropolitan statistical areas (μSAs) covering 20 counties. In 2022, the CSA's population estimate was 2,631,863, ranking as the 27th largest in the U.S.

Statistical Area	2025 estimate	2020 Census	Change	Area	Density
Indianapolis–Carmel–Greenwood, IN Metropolitan Statistical Area	2,205,695	2,089,653	+5.55%	4,118.17 sq mi (10,666.0 km^{2})	536/sq mi (207/km^{2})
Muncie, IN Metropolitan Statistical Area (Delaware County)	113,106	111,903	+1.08%	395.91 sq mi (1,025.4 km^{2})	286/sq mi (110/km^{2})
Columbus, IN Metropolitan Statistical Area (Bartholomew County)	85,729	82,208	+4.28%	409.52 sq mi (1,060.7 km^{2})	209/sq mi (81/km^{2})
Kokomo, IN Metropolitan Statistical Area (Howard County)	83,904	83,658	+0.29%	293.92 sq mi (761.2 km^{2})	285/sq mi (110/km^{2})
New Castle, IN Micropolitan Statistical Area (Henry County)	49,137	48,914	+0.46%	394.83 sq mi (1,022.6 km^{2})	124/sq mi (48/km^{2})
Seymour, IN Micropolitan Statistical Area (Jackson County)	47,370	46,428	+2.03%	513.91 sq mi (1,331.0 km^{2})	92/sq mi (36/km^{2})
Crawfordsville, IN Micropolitan Statistical Area (Montgomery County)	38,954	37,936	+2.68%	505.44 sq mi (1,309.1 km^{2})	77/sq mi (30/km^{2})
Greencastle, IN Micropolitan Statistical Area (Putnam County)	37,876	36,726	+3.13%	482.69 sq mi (1,250.2 km^{2})	78/sq mi (30/km^{2})
Peru, IN Micropolitan Statistical Area (Miami County)	34,487	35,962	−4.10%	377.39 sq mi (977.4 km^{2})	91/sq mi (35/km^{2})
Greensburg, IN Micropolitan Statistical Area (Decatur County)	26,576	26,472	+0.39%	373.32 sq mi (966.9 km^{2})	71/sq mi (27/km^{2})
Total	2,722,834	2,599,860	+4.73%	7,865.1 sq mi (20,371 km^{2})	346/sq mi (134/km^{2})

== Area codes ==
Area code 317 covered all of northern and central Indiana until 1948 when area code 219 was created. Central Indiana remained under the 317 banner until 1997 when growth in and around Indianapolis prompted the creation of area code 765; The immediate Indianapolis area remained in the 317 area code, with the more distant counties being placed in the new area code. Due to the increase in assigned numbers, overlay area code 463 for area code 317 was implemented in late 2016, thereby requiring 10-digit dialing.

The 317 area code now covers the Boone, Hancock, Hamilton, Hendricks, Johnson, Madison, Morgan, and Shelby counties. The other counties in the combined statistical area are in the 765 area code except for those in the southern part of the CSA that are in the 812/930 area codes.

== Economy ==
The gross domestic product of the Indianapolis metropolitan area was (USD) $162.1 billion in 2021, among the 30 largest metropolitan economies in the U.S. In 2025, the Indianapolis area was home to several of Indiana's largest public companies by revenue, including Elevance Health, Lilly, Corteva, Simon Property Group, Elanco, CNO Financial Group, Calumet, Inc., Allison Transmission, Republic Airways Holdings, and First Internet Bancorp. Private companies included the Federal Home Loan Bank of Indianapolis, OneAmerica Financial, CountryMark, and Lucas Oil Products. Notable subsidiaries headquartered in the area include AES Indiana, Delta Faucet Company, Finish Line, Group 1001, Herff Jones, Klipsch Audio Technologies, Lids Sports Group, Pay Less Super Markets, and Steak 'n Shake.

The Indianapolis area is a global hub for motorsports, specifically American open-wheel car racing. Notable facilities include Anderson Speedway in Anderson, the Indianapolis Motor Speedway in Speedway, Lucas Oil Indianapolis Raceway Park in Brownsburg, and Whiteland Raceway Park in Whiteland, among many others. Racing teams based in the metro area include Andretti Global, Arrow McLaren, Chip Ganassi Racing, Ed Carpenter Racing, and Juncos Hollinger Racing in Indianapolis; Dreyer & Reinbold Racing in Carmel, HMD Motorsports and Wayne Taylor Racing in Brownsburg, and Rahal Letterman Lanigan Racing in Zionsville, among numerous others. Italian racecar manufacturer Dallara opened a facility in Speedway in 2012. Cadillac F1 is headquartered in Fishers.

More than 40 collegiate fraternities and sororities are headquartered in the Indianapolis metropolitan area, the largest concentration in North America.

== Education ==
=== Colleges and universities ===
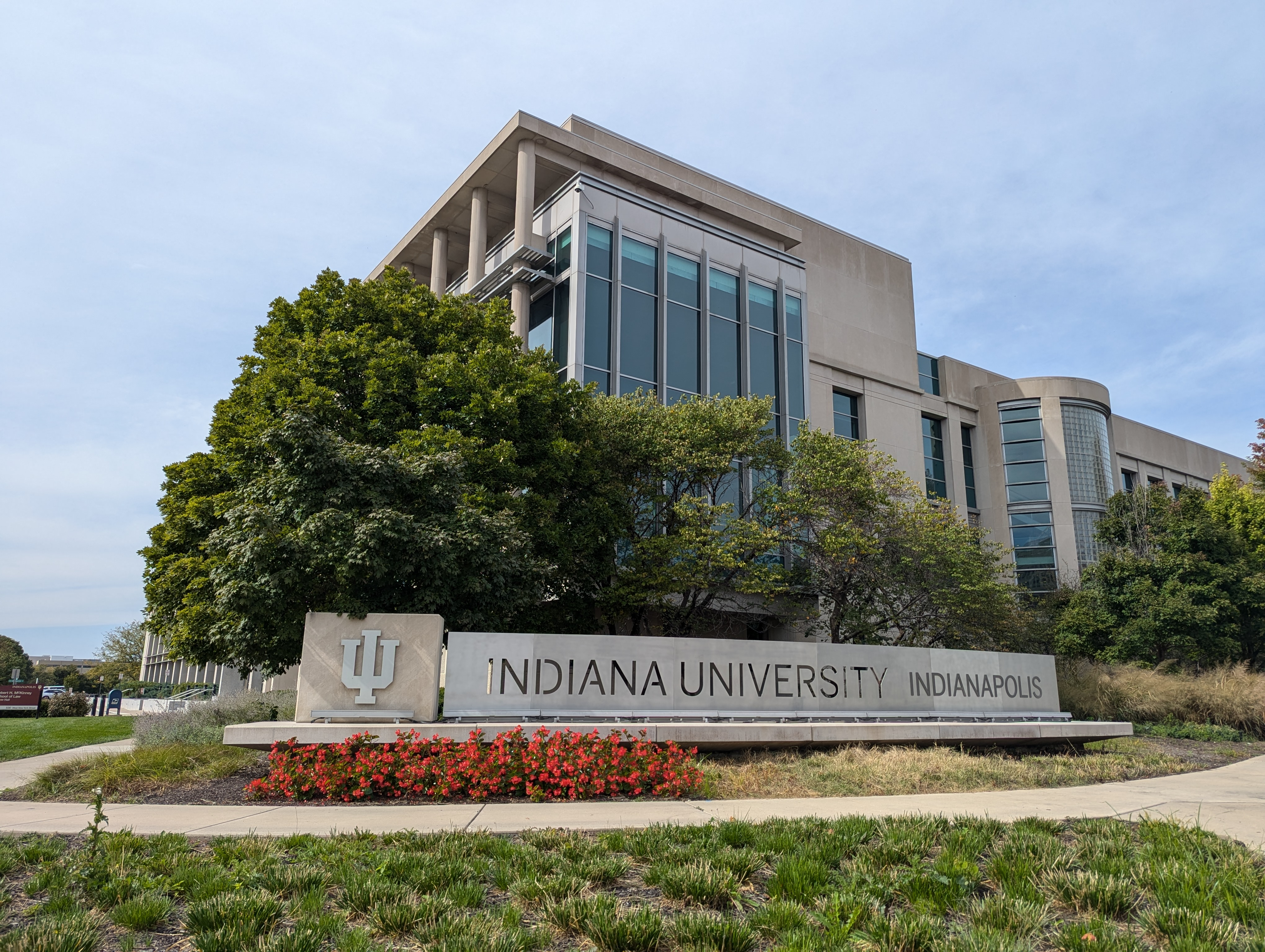
IU Indianapolis has the highest enrollment of colleges and universities in the MSA.

Asterisks (*) denote institutions whose flagship campuses are located outside the Indianapolis MSA. Notable colleges and universities include:

- Anderson University
- Ball State University* (two sites)
- Bishop Simon Bruté College Seminary
- Butler University
- Christian Theological Seminary
- College of Biblical Studies*
- Franklin College
- Indiana Bible College
- Indiana Tech*
- Indiana University Indianapolis
- Indiana Wesleyan University* (two sites)
- Ivy Tech Community College (seven sites)
- Marian University
- Oakland City University*
- Purdue Polytechnic Institute* (three sites)
- Purdue University in Indianapolis*
- University of Indianapolis
- Vincennes University*

=== School districts ===
Notable public school districts in the Indianapolis MSA include:

- Alexandria Community School Corporation
- Anderson Community School Corporation
- Beech Grove City Schools
- Brownsburg Community School Corporation
- Carmel Clay Schools
- Center Grove Community School Corporation
- Clark-Pleasant Community School Corporation
- Danville Community School Corporation
- Franklin Community School Corporation
- Franklin Township Community School Corporation
- Greenfield-Central Community School Corporation
- Hamilton Heights School Corporation
- Hamilton Southeastern Schools
- Indianapolis Public Schools
- Lebanon Community School Corporation
- Metropolitan School District of Decatur Township
- Metropolitan School District of Lawrence Township
- Metropolitan School District of Martinsville
- Metropolitan School District of Pike Township
- Metropolitan School District of Warren Township
- Metropolitan School District of Washington Township
- Metropolitan School District of Wayne Township
- Mill Creek Community School Corporation
- Nineveh-Hensley-Jackson United School Corporation
- Noblesville Schools
- North West Hendricks School Corporation
- Perry Township Schools
- Plainfield Community School Corporation
- School Town of Speedway
- Zionsville Community School Corporation

== Transportation ==
=== Highways ===
Indiana's "Crossroads of America" moniker is largely attributed to the historical function of the Indianapolis metropolitan area has played as a center for logistics and transportation.

==== Interstates ====
The Indianapolis MSA is a major junction on the United States Interstate Highway System, with four primary and two auxiliary highways:

- I-65 – Runs to Gary, Indiana, to the north and Louisville, Kentucky, Nashville, Tennessee, and Birmingham, Alabama, to the south
- I-69 – Runs to Fort Wayne, Indiana, and Lansing and Flint, Michigan, to the north, and Evansville, Indiana, to the south
- I-70 – Runs to Dayton and Columbus, Ohio, and Baltimore, Maryland, to the east and St. Louis and Kansas City, Missouri, and Denver, Colorado, to the west
- I-74 – Runs to Cincinnati, Ohio, to the east and Peoria, Illinois, to the west
- I-465 – Beltway circling suburban Indianapolis; also known as the USS Indianapolis Memorial Highway
- I-865 – East–west connector northwest of Indianapolis in Boone County

==== US Highways ====
- US 31
- US 36
- US 40
- US 52
- US 136
- US 231
- US 421

==== Indiana state highways ====
- SR 9
- SR 13
- SR 19
- SR 28
- SR 32
- SR 37
- SR 38
- SR 39
- SR 42
- SR 43
- SR 44
- SR 45
- SR 46
- SR 47
- SR 67
- SR 75
- SR 109
- SR 128
- SR 132
- SR 134
- SR 135
- SR 142
- SR 144
- SR 213
- SR 232
- SR 234
- SR 236
- SR 238
- SR 244
- SR 252
- SR 267
- SR 931

==== Other notable roads ====
- Indiana Avenue (Indianapolis) – One of four diagonal streets included in Alexander Ralston's 1821 Plat of Indianapolis, the street became a center for the local African American community and now anchors a cultural district of the same name.
- Meridian Street – A primary north–south route through Marion and Hamilton counties, the street serves as the axis separating east addresses from west addresses.
- Michigan Road – Indiana's first "highway," built in the 1830s and 1840s, running north to Michigan City, Indiana, and south to Madison, Indiana.
- Sam Jones Expressway (Indianapolis) – Expressway between I-465 and I-70, connecting south-central Indianapolis with the site of the former terminal of the Indianapolis International Airport.
- Washington Street (Indianapolis) – A primary east–west street through Marion County, the street follows the route of the National Road for almost all of its length in the city of Indianapolis.

=== Public transit ===
- Access Johnson County (Johnson County)
- Central Indiana Regional Transportation Authority (Boone and Hendricks counties)
- City of Anderson Transit System (Madison County)
- IndyGo (Marion County)

=== Air ===
The Indianapolis metropolitan area is served by several airports, most under the ownership and operation of the Indianapolis Airport Authority, including Eagle Creek Airpark (EYE), Indianapolis Metropolitan Airport (UMP), Indianapolis Regional Airport (MQJ), Hendricks County Airport (2R2), Indianapolis Downtown Heliport (8A4), and the busiest airport in the state, Indianapolis International Airport (IND). In 2022, Indianapolis International served 8.7 million passengers and handled 1.25 million metric tonnes of cargo.

Other airports within the region include:

- Alexandria Airport
- Anderson Municipal Airport
- Boone County Airport
- Franklin Flying Field
- Indianapolis Executive Airport
- Indy South Greenwood Airport
- Noblesville Airport
- Pope Field
- Shelbyville Municipal Airport
- Sheridan Airport
- Westfield Airport

=== Rail ===
Indianapolis Union Station is served by Amtrak's Cardinal, which operates thrice-weekly between Chicago and New York City.

== Sports ==
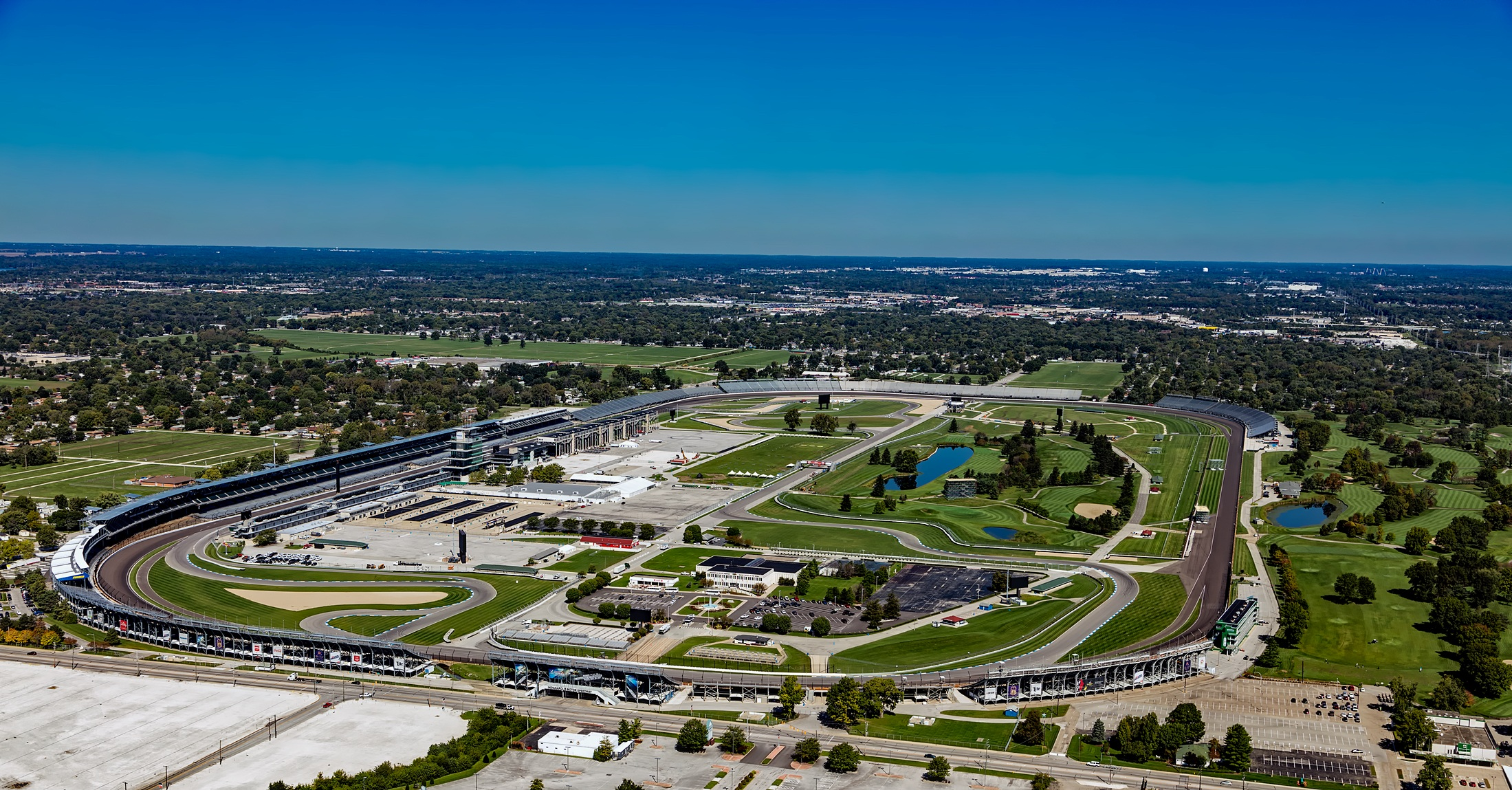
Indianapolis Motor Speedway, located in the town of Speedway

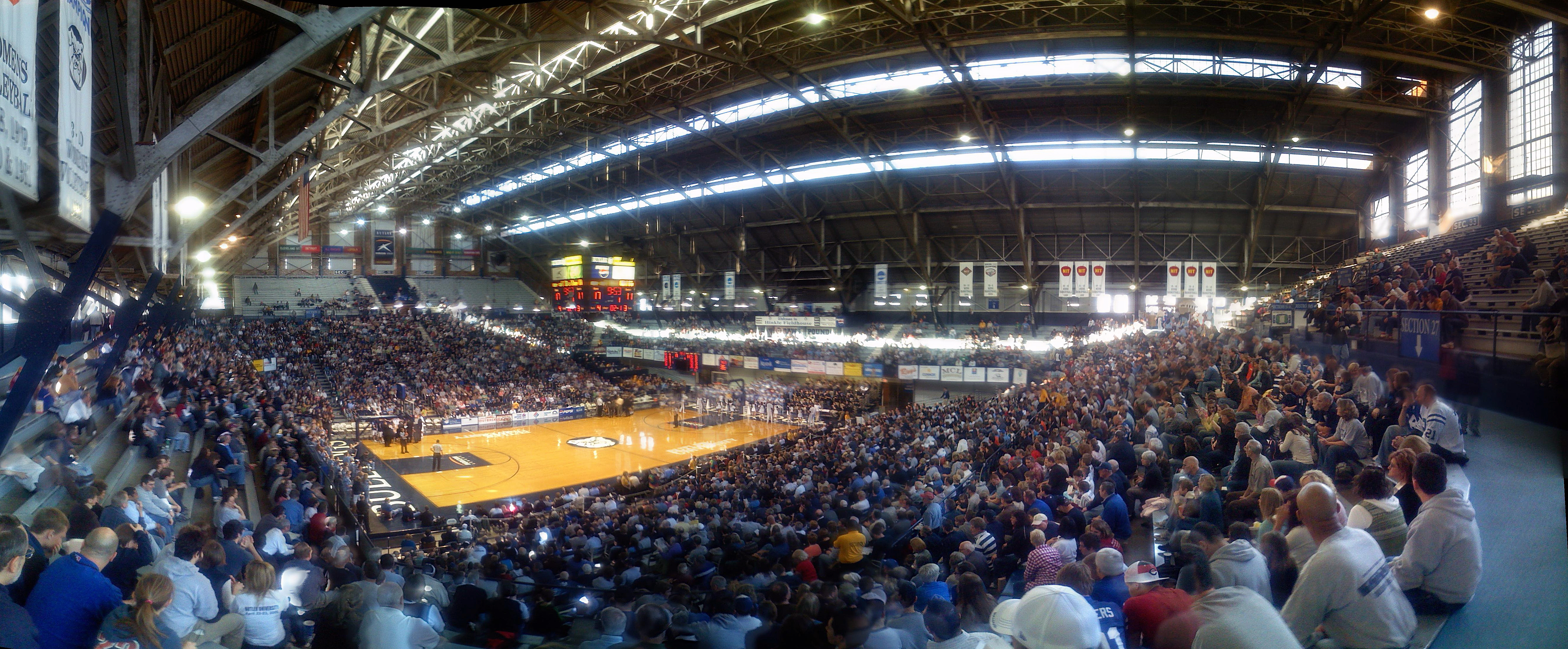
Hinkle Fieldhouse is home to the Butler Bulldogs. In 1954, Hinkle hosted the "Milan Miracle," inspiring the 1986 film Hoosiers.

=== Professional teams ===
Club	Sport	Founded	League	Venue
Indianapolis Colts	American football	1984	NFL	Lucas Oil Stadium
Indiana Pacers	Basketball	1967	NBA	Gainbridge Fieldhouse
Indiana Fever	Basketball	2000	WNBA	Gainbridge Fieldhouse
Indy Eleven	Soccer	2013	USL	Carroll Stadium
Indy Fuel	Ice hockey	2014	ECHL	Fishers Event Center
Indianapolis Indians	Baseball	1902	IL (Triple-A)	Victory Field

=== Semi-professional teams ===
Club	Sport	Founded	League	Venue
F.C. Indiana	Women's Soccer	2003	WPSL	Newton Park
Indianapolis AlleyCats	Ultimate	2012	AUDL	Grand Park

=== College sports (Division I) ===
Headquartered in Indianapolis, the National Collegiate Athletic Association (NCAA) is the preeminent collegiate athletic governing body in the U.S. and Canada, regulating athletes of 1,281 institutions; conferences; organizations; and individuals. The NCAA also organizes the athletic programs of many colleges and universities and helps more than 450,000 college student-athletes who compete annually in college sports.

=== Events ===
The Indianapolis metropolitan area hosts several notable sporting events annually, including the Brickyard 400, Grand Prix of Indianapolis, NHRA U.S. Nationals, NFL Scouting Combine, Big Ten Football Championship Game, the largest half marathon in the U.S., and the largest single-day sporting event in the world, the Indianapolis 500. The cars competing in the latter race are known as IndyCars as a reference to the event. Indianapolis has also been a frequent host of the NCAA Division I Men's and Women's basketball tournaments. Other major sporting events hosted include Pan American Games X in 1987, Super Bowl XLVI in 2012, and the 2013 International Champions Cup between Chelsea F.C. and Inter Milan.

High school sports are highly competitive in Greater Indianapolis. In 2013, MaxPreps ranked Indianapolis No. 3 in its Top 10 Metro Areas for High School Football.

== Notable natives ==
- Steve Alford
- Philip Warren Anderson
- John Andretti
- Babyface (musician)
- Melvin E. Biddle
- Tim Bogar
- Roger D. Branigin
- James Brewer
- Maria Cantwell
- Rodney Carney
- Ed Carpenter
- Lauren Cheney
- Roosevelt Colvin
- Mike Conley Jr.
- James Dean
- Chris Doleman
- Tandon Doss
- Katie Douglas
- Colonel Eli Lilly
- Steve Ells
- Anthony W. England
- Mike Epps
- Carl Erskine
- Michael L. Eskew
- Carl G. Fisher
- Jared Fogle
- Jake Fox
- Vivica A. Fox
- Brendan Fraser
- Katie Gearlds
- Jeff George
- Eric Gordon
- Jeff Gordon
- John Green
- William Grose
- Nick Hardwick
- Del Harris
- Gordon Hayward
- Alan Henderson
- George Hill
- Tommy Hunter
- JaJuan Johnson
- Mathias Kiwanuka
- Ron Klain
- Adam Lambert
- Courtney Lee
- David Letterman
- Richard Lugar
- Lance Lynn
- George McGinnis
- Nick Martin (American football)
- Zach Martin
- Steve McQueen
- Josh McRoberts
- Brandon Miller
- Rick Mount
- Ryan Murphy (producer)
- Greg Oden
- Jane Pauley
- Madelyn Pugh
- Oscar Robertson
- Courtney Roby
- Walter Bedell Smith
- Brad Stevens
- Tony Stewart
- Drew Storen
- Marc Summers
- Steve Talley
- Jeff Teague
- Jeremy Trueblood
- Kurt Vonnegut
- Herman B Wells
- Jason Whitlock
- David Wolf
- John Wooden
- Mike Woodson
- Lew Wallace

== See also ==
- Great Lakes megalopolis
- List of metropolitan areas in Indiana
- List of Midwestern metropolitan areas
- List of U.S. metropolitan areas with large African-American populations
- List of U.S. metropolitan areas by GDP per capita
- List of United States metropolitan areas by per capita income
- List of North American metropolitan areas by population
- List of metropolitan areas by GDP over US$100 billion
