= Anderson High School (Indiana) =

Location
- 4610 South Madison Avenue; Anderson, Madison County, Indiana 46013; United States; 40°03′58″N 85°41′28″W

Information
- Type: Public high school
- Motto: Forever Proud, Forever Strong, Forever Indians
- Established: 1873 (rebuilt 1999)
- School district: Anderson Community School Corporation
- Superintendent: Joe Cronk (out-going)
- Principal: Alan Landes
- Staff: 120.13 (FTE)
- Grades: 9-12
- Enrollment: 1,722 (2023–2024)
- Student to teacher ratio: 14.33
- Color
- Athletics conference: North Central
- Team name: Indians
- Website: https://ahs.acsc.net/

Anderson High School is a public high school located in Anderson, Indiana. The school's students are known as "The Anderson Indians." Both the school and the city of Anderson, Indiana are named after Chief William Anderson, the leader of the Unalatchgo Lenape people from 1806 to 1831. It is a part of the Anderson Community School Corporation. Anderson High School is the combination of three past high schools that were located in Anderson, Indiana. The original Anderson High School (1873), Madison Heights High School (1953), and Highland High School (1955). In 1999, a new building was built near the original location of Madison Heights High School, combining all three schools.

The majority of Anderson is in the school district. The district also includes Country Club Heights, Edgewood, River Forest, Woodlawn Heights, and the majority of Chesterfield.

== Athletics ==
Anderson High School currently competes in and was a founding member of the North Central Conference. From 1961 until 2011 the basketball teams played in Anderson's historic Wigwam which had a seating capacity of 8,996.

State Championships
Sport	Year(s)
Boys Basketball (3)	1935, 1937, 1946
Boys Cross Country (9)	1946, 1947, 1948, 1949, 1950, 1951, 1952, 1955, 1959
Boys Golf (6)	1952, 1953, 1955, 1972, 1974, 1995
Boys Swimming & Diving (2)	1988, 1989
Girls Swimming & Diving (2)	1984, 1985
Boys Track & Field (4)	1945, 1963, 1967, 1968

== Marching Band (Marching Highlanders) ==
Anderson High School has a marching band that competes in The Central Indiana Track Show Association (CITSA) in the summer as the Anderson High School Marching Highlanders. The Highlanders are known throughout the state for their unique uniforms and music. The Highlanders performed in full Scottish regalia, including kilts, plaids, and doublets. The Highlanders have a bagpipe group where they teach bagpipes, one of only a handful in United States high schools who teach them.

The Marching Highlanders were originally from Highland High School but were moved to the new reestablished high school. The Marching Indians and the Madison Heights Band of Pirates were the previous marching bands from the original Anderson High School and Madison Heights High School. Today, the Anderson High School Marching Highlanders still honor both the Marching Indians and Band of Pirates as a "Three in One" marching band.

== Notable alumni ==
- Melvin E. Biddle, United States Army Medal of Honor recipient
- Joe Campbell, professional golfer
- Harvey Weir Cook, American fighter ace in World War I
- Michael Earley, head baseball coach at Texas A&M University
- Marion Durbin Ellis, American ichthyologist and entomologist
- Carl Erskine professional baseball player
- Jumping Johnny Wilson, former Harlem Globetrotter
- Ken Johnson, former NFL player
- Terry Johnson, American basketball coach
- Robert Kessler, former NBL player
- Troy Lewis, basketball player for Purdue University
- Josh Pitcock, chief of staff to the Vice President of the United States
- Amber Portwood, reality TV personality and criminal
- Robert L. Rock, politician

== Mascot controversy ==
The school has been accused of "racism and cultural appropriation" for its portrayals of the school's mascots, "The Indian" and "The Maiden" during sports events, but defenders of the portrayals point to the history of the school's name and traditions.

== See also ==
- List of high schools in Indiana
