= Edgewood, Indiana =

- Town
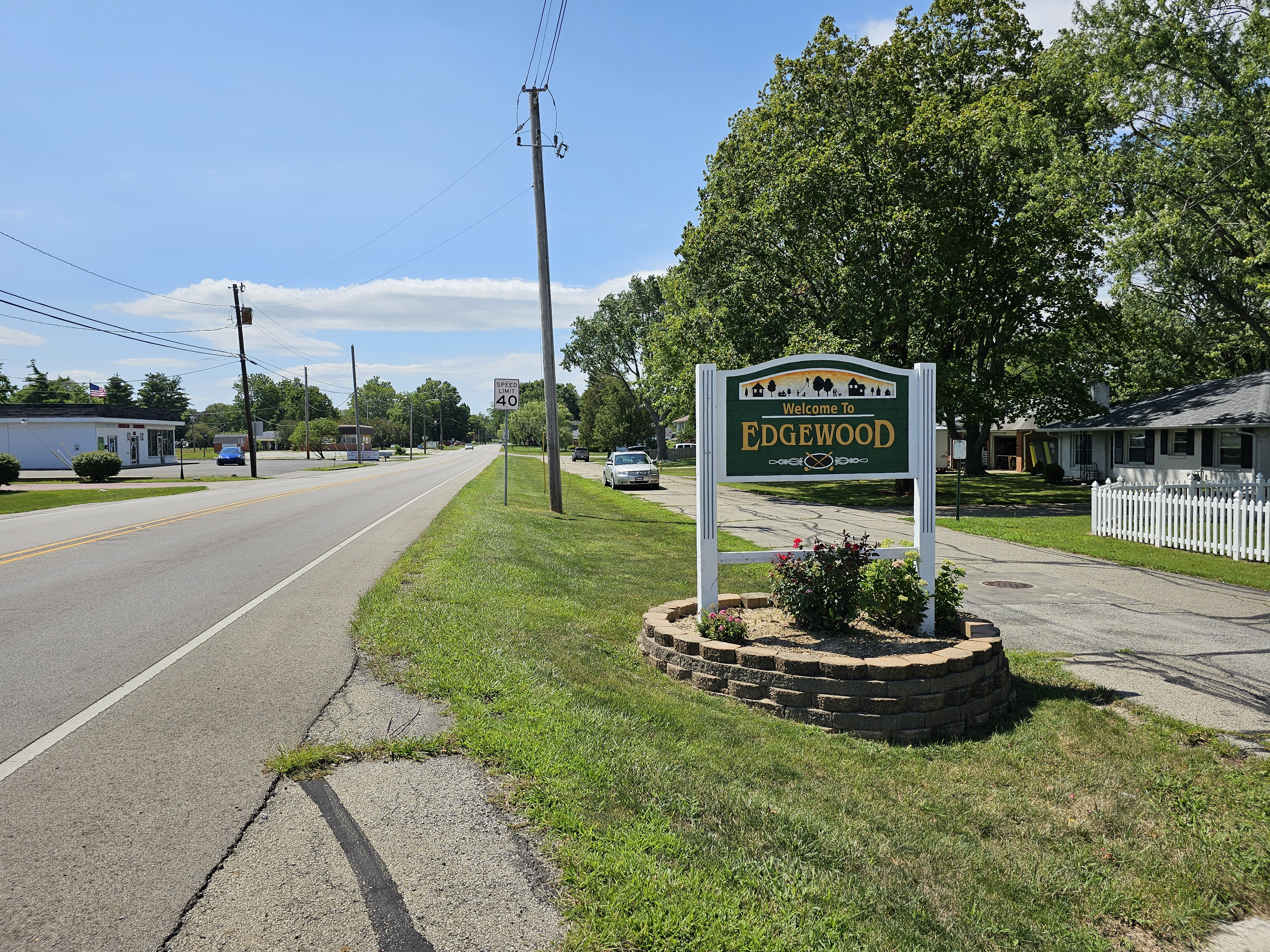
- The town of Edgewood, Indiana

- Location in Madison County, Indiana
- Coordinates: 40°06′12″N 85°44′15″W
- Country: United States
- State: Indiana
- County: Madison
- Township: Anderson

Area
  - Total: 0.80 sq mi (2.08 km^{2})
  - Land: 0.80 sq mi (2.08 km^{2})
  - Water: 0 sq mi (0.00 km^{2})
- Elevation: 869 ft (265 m)

Population (2020)
  - Total: 2,053
  - Estimate (2025): 2,066 ▲
  - Density: 2,556.3/sq mi (987.01/km^{2})
- Time zone: UTC-5 (EST)
  - Summer (DST): UTC-5 (EST)
- ZIP Code: 46011 (Anderson)
- Area code: 765
- FIPS code: 18-20332
- GNIS feature ID: 2396920
- Website: www.in.gov/towns/edgewood/

Edgewood is a town in Anderson Township, Madison County, Indiana, United States. It is part of the Indianapolis–Carmel–Anderson metropolitan statistical area. The population was 2,053 at the 2020 census.

== History ==
Edgewood was founded in 1916 by General Motors as a suburb for automotive workers.

== Geography ==
Edgewood is located in central Madison County. It is bordered to the north, east, and south by the city of Anderson, the county seat, while to the west it is bordered by Jackson Township. The town of River Forest touches Edgewood at its northeast corner.

Indiana State Road 32 (Nichol Avenue) crosses Edgewood, leading east 2.8 miles (4.5 km) to the center of Anderson and west-southwest 15 miles (24 km) to Noblesville.

According to the U.S. Census Bureau, Edgewood has a total area of 0.80 square miles (2.07 km^{2}), all land.

== Demographics ==
Historical population
Census	Pop.	Note	%±
1940	229		—
1950	796		247.6%
1960	2,119		166.2%
1970	2,326		9.8%
1980	2,215		−4.8%
1990	2,057		−7.1%
2000	1,988		−3.4%
2010	1,913		−3.8%
2020	2,053		7.3%
2025 (est.)	2,066	▲	0.6%
U.S. Decennial Census

=== 2020 census ===
As of the 2020 census, Edgewood had a population of 2,053. The median age was 47.7 years. 20.8% of residents were under the age of 18 and 25.3% of residents were 65 years of age or older. For every 100 females there were 91.0 males, and for every 100 females age 18 and over there were 88.1 males age 18 and over.

100.0% of residents lived in urban areas, while 0.0% lived in rural areas.

There were 880 households in Edgewood, of which 28.2% had children under the age of 18 living in them. Of all households, 58.1% were married-couple households, 11.7% were households with a male householder and no spouse or partner present, and 25.0% were households with a female householder and no spouse or partner present. About 24.5% of all households were made up of individuals and 14.0% had someone living alone who was 65 years of age or older.

There were 914 housing units, of which 3.7% were vacant. The homeowner vacancy rate was 1.6% and the rental vacancy rate was 2.7%.

Racial composition as of the 2020 census
Race	Number	Percent
White	1,799	87.6%
Black or African American	106	5.2%
American Indian and Alaska Native	4	0.2%
Asian	11	0.5%
Native Hawaiian and Other Pacific Islander	0	0.0%
Some other race	18	0.9%
Two or more races	115	5.6%
Hispanic or Latino (of any race)	60	2.9%

=== 2010 census ===
As of the census of 2010, there were 1,913 people, 854 households, and 566 families living in the town. The population density was 2,361.7 inhabitants per square mile (911.9/km^{2}). There were 912 housing units at an average density of 1,125.9 per square mile (434.7/km^{2}). The racial makeup of the town was 92.9% White, 4.5% African American, 0.2% Native American, 0.3% Asian, 0.9% from other races, and 1.2% from two or more races. Hispanic or Latino of any race were 1.8% of the population.

There were 854 households, of which 24.5% had children under the age of 18 living with them; 55.4% were married couples living together; 8.2% had a female householder with no husband present; 2.7% had a male householder with no wife present; and 33.7% were non-families. 29.0% of all households were made up of individuals, and 13.4% had someone living alone who was 65 years of age or older. The average household size was 2.24 and the average family size was 2.75.

The median age in the town was 47.4 years. 20.2% of residents were under the age of 18; 4.4% were between the ages of 18 and 24; 22.2% were from 25 to 44; 31.8% were from 45 to 64; and 21.3% were 65 years of age or older. The gender makeup of the town was 47.0% male and 53.0% female.

=== 2000 census ===
As of the census of 2000, there were 1,988 people, 875 households, and 620 families living in the town. The population density was 2,468.9 inhabitants per square mile (953.2/km^{2}). There were 898 housing units at an average density of 1,115.2 per square mile (430.6/km^{2}). The racial makeup of the town was 95.57% White, 3.37% African American, 0.05% Native American, 0.15% Asian, 0.20% from other races, and 0.65% from two or more races. Hispanic or Latino of any race were 0.25% of the population.

There were 875 households, out of which 24.7% had children under the age of 18 living with them;63.1% were married couples living together; 5.6% had a female householder with no husband present;CEand 29.1% were non-families. 26.7% of all households were made up of individuals, and 15.1% had someone living alone who was 65 years of age or older. The average household size was 2.27 and the average family size was 2.73.

In the town, the population was spread out, with 20.3% under the age of 18, 3.8% from 18 to 24, 25.1% from 25 to 44, 28.1% from 45 to 64, and 22.8% who were 65 years of age or older. The median age was 46 years. For every 100 females, there were 91.3 males. For every 100 females age 18 and over, there were 86.9 males.

The median income for a household in the town was $57,857, and the median income for a family was $74,508. Males had a median income of $49,808 versus $31,739 for females. The per capita income for the town was $30,383. About 0.8% of families and 1.9% of the population were below the poverty line, including 2.1% of those under age 18 and 2.8% of those age 65 or over.

== Education ==
It is in the Anderson Community School Corporation. The district's comprehensive high school is Anderson High School.

== See also ==
- List of cities surrounded by another city
