= Woodlawn Heights =

Woodlawn Heights may refer to the following places in the United States:

- Woodlawn Heights, Bronx
- Woodlawn Heights, Indiana
