= Anderson Township, Indiana =

Anderson Township is the name of four townships in the U.S. state of Indiana:

- Anderson Township, Madison County, Indiana
- Anderson Township, Perry County, Indiana
- Anderson Township, Rush County, Indiana
- Anderson Township, Warrick County, Indiana
