= List of Midwestern metropolitan areas =

This is a list of the largest Metropolitan Statistical Areas in the American Midwest. These states are Illinois, Indiana, Iowa, Kansas, Michigan, Minnesota, Missouri, Ohio, Nebraska, North Dakota, South Dakota and Wisconsin. Part of the Great Lakes Megalopolis.

Rank	City	State(s)	Population 2020 Census
1	Chicago-Naperville-Joliet	IL	9,618,502
2	Detroit	MI	4,392,041
3	Minneapolis–St. Paul	MN	3,690,261
4	St. Louis	MO, IL	2,820,253
5	Cincinnati	OH, KY, IN	2,256,884
6	Kansas City	MO, KS	2,192,035
7	Columbus	OH	2,138,926
8	Indianapolis-Carmel-Anderson	IN	2,111,040
9	Cleveland-Elyria	OH	2,077,240
10	Milwaukee-Waukesha	WI	1,574,731
11	Grand Rapids-Kentwood	MI	1,087,592
12	Omaha-Council Bluffs	NE, IA	967,604
13	Dayton	OH	814,049
14	Des Moines-West Des Moines	IA	709,466
15	Akron	OH	702,219
16	Madison	WI	680,796
17	Wichita	KS	647,610
18	Toledo	OH	646,604
19	Lansing-East Lansing	MI	541,297
20	Youngstown-Warren-Boardman	OH	541,243
21	Springfield	MO	475,432
22	Fort Wayne	IN	419,601
23	Flint	MI	406,211
24	Canton-Massillion	OH	401,574
25	Davenport-Moline-Rock Island	IA, IL	384,324
26	Ann Arbor	MI	372,258
27	Peoria	IL	368,782
28	Lincoln	NE	340,217
29	Rockford	IL	338,798
30	Green Bay	WI	328,268
31	South Bend-Mishawaka	IN, MI	324,501
32	Evansville	IN	314,049
33	Duluth	MN, WI	291,638
34	Sioux Falls	SD	276,730
35	Cedar Rapids	IA	276,520
36	Kalamazoo-Portage	MI	261,670
37	Fargo	ND, MN	249,843
38	Appleton	WI	243,147
39	Topeka	KS	233,152
40	Rochester	MN	226,329
41	Lafayette-West Lafayette	IN	223,716
42	Champaign-Urbana	IL	222,538
43	Columbia	MO	210,864
44	Springfield	IL	208,640
45	Elkhart-Goshen	IN	207,047
46	St. Cloud	MN	199,671
47	Racine	WI	197,727
48	Saginaw	MI	190,124
49	Terre Haute	IN	185,031
50	Joplin	MO	181,409
