= List of cities surrounded by another city =

This is a list of cities that are each surrounded by one other city. A city surrounded by another city or territory is a form of an enclave.

== Canada ==
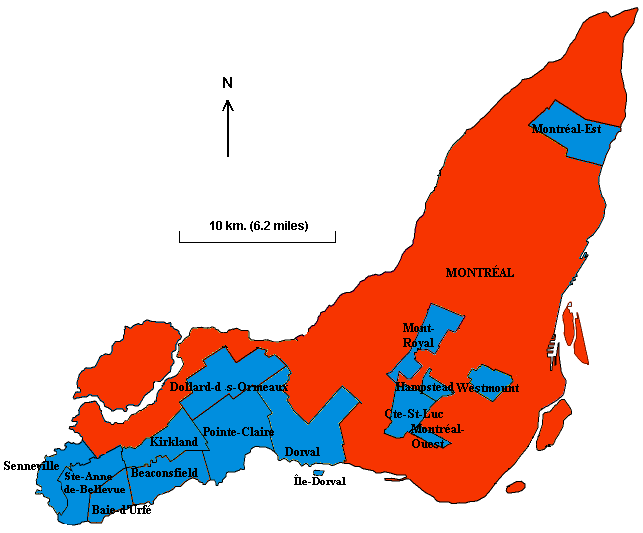
Map of Island of Montreal, showing all municipalities

- Chapais, Quebec, surrounded by Eeyou Istchee James Bay (Note: As well as the places mentioned on this list, the municipality of Eeyou Istchee James Bay also surrounds some of the constituent Cree communities of Eeyou Istchee TE)
- Chibougamau, Quebec, surrounded by Eeyou Istchee James Bay
- Côte Saint-Luc, Quebec, surrounded by Montreal; though also shares a border with Hampstead and Montreal West
- Hampstead, Quebec, surrounded by Montreal; though also shares a border with Côte Saint-Luc
- L'Ancienne-Lorette, Quebec, surrounded by Quebec City
- Lebel-sur-Quévillon, Quebec, surrounded by Eeyou Istchee James Bay
- Matagami, Quebec, surrounded by Eeyou Istchee James Bay
- Montreal East, Quebec, surrounded by Montreal; though also has a coast on the St. Lawrence River
- Montreal West, Quebec, surrounded by Montreal
- Mount Royal, Quebec, surrounded by Montreal
- Wendake, Quebec, surrounded by Quebec City
- Westmount, Quebec, surrounded by Montreal
- White Rock, British Columbia, surrounded by Surrey; though also has a coast on Boundary Bay

== Europe ==
Map of Spain, showing all municipalities

=== Spain ===
- Alcantarilla, surrounded by Murcia
- Pliego, surrounded by Mula

=== United Kingdom ===
- City of London, surrounded by London
- Llandaf, surrounded by Cardiff
- Salford, surrounded by Manchester

=== Denmark ===
- Frederiksberg Municipality, surrounded by Copenhagen

=== Finland ===
- Kauniainen, surrounded by Espoo

=== Italy ===
- Maletto, surrounded by Bronte

=== Bosnia ===
- Međurečje, surrounded by Priboj, Serbia

=== Vatican City ===
- Vatican City, surrounded by Rome, Italy

=== Ukraine ===
- Kotsiubynske, surrounded by Kyiv

== Asia ==
=== United Arab Emirates ===
- Nahwa, surrounded by Madha, Oman

=== India ===
- New Delhi, surrounded by Delhi

=== Taiwan ===
- Taipei, surrounded by New Taipei
- Keelung City shares its only land border with New Taipei City

== Australia ==
- Kaltukatjara, Northern Territory, surrounded by Petermann
- Mutitjulu, Northern Territory, surrounded by Petermann
- Yulara, Northern Territory, surrounded by Petermann

== United States ==
=== Alabama ===
- Madison, Alabama, largely surrounded by Huntsville

=== Arizona ===
- South Tucson, Arizona, surrounded by Tucson

=== Arkansas ===
- Cammack Village, Arkansas, surrounded by Little Rock

=== California ===
- Alameda, California, surrounded by Oakland; though also has a coast on San Francisco Bay
- Beverly Hills, California, surrounded by Los Angeles; though also shares a border with West Hollywood
- Burbank, California, largely surrounded by Los Angeles
- Campbell, California, largely surrounded by San Jose
- Carson, California, largely surrounded by Los Angeles
- Culver City, California, surrounded by Los Angeles; though also shares a border with Ladera Heights
- Gardena, California, largely surrounded by Los Angeles
- Inglewood, California, largely surrounded by Los Angeles
- Newark, California, surrounded by Fremont
- Piedmont, California, surrounded by Oakland
- Port Hueneme, California, surrounded by Oxnard; though also has a coast on the Pacific Ocean
- San Fernando, California, surrounded by Los Angeles
- Santa Monica, California, surrounded by Los Angeles; though also has a coast on the Pacific Ocean
- Signal Hill, California, surrounded by Long Beach
- Villa Park, California, surrounded by Orange
- West Hollywood, California, surrounded by Los Angeles

=== Colorado ===
- Glendale, Colorado, surrounded by Denver; within Glendale, there is also a city block of Denver

=== Florida ===
- Baldwin, Florida, surrounded by Jacksonville
- Lazy Lake, Florida, surrounded by Wilton Manors
- Windermere, Florida, surrounded by Lake Butler

=== Idaho ===
- Garden City, Idaho, largely surrounded by Boise

=== Illinois ===
- Harwood Heights, Illinois, surrounded by Chicago; though also shares a border with Norridge
- Norridge, Illinois, surrounded by Chicago; though also shares a border with Harwood Heights
- Rockdale, Illinois, surrounded by Joliet; within Rockdale, there is also a stretch of road of Joliet

=== Indiana ===
- Beech Grove, Indiana, surrounded by Indianapolis
- Clermont, Indiana, largely surrounded by Indianapolis
- Country Club Heights, Indiana, surrounded by Anderson; though also shares a border with Woodlawn Heights
- Crows Nest, Indiana, surrounded by Indianapolis; though also shares a border with North Crows Nest and Rocky Ripple
- Cumberland, Indiana, largely surrounded by Indianapolis
- Edgewood, Indiana, surrounded by Anderson; though also shares a border with River Forest
- Homecroft, Indiana, surrounded by Indianapolis; though also shares a border with Southport
- Lawrence, Indiana, largely surrounded by Indianapolis
- Meridian Hills, Indiana, surrounded by Indianapolis; though also shares a border with Williams Creek
- North Crows Nest, Indiana, surrounded by Indianapolis; though also shares a border with Crows Nest
- Pottawattamie Park, Indiana, surrounded by Michigan City
- River Forest, Indiana, surrounded by Anderson; though also shares a border with Edgewood
- Rocky Ripple, Indiana, surrounded by Indianapolis; though also shares a border with Crows Nest
- Southport, Indiana, surrounded by Indianapolis; though also shares a border with Homecroft
- Speedway, Indiana, surrounded by Indianapolis
- Spring Hill, Indiana, surrounded by Indianapolis; though also shares a border with Wynnedale
- Ulen, Indiana, surrounded by Lebanon
- Warren Park, Indiana, surrounded by Indianapolis
- Williams Creek, Indiana, surrounded by Indianapolis; though also shares a border with Meridian Hills
- Woodlawn Heights, Indiana, surrounded by Anderson; though also shares a border with Country Club Heights
- Wynnedale, Indiana, surrounded by Indianapolis; though also shares a border with Spring Hill

=== Iowa ===
- Panorama Park, Iowa, surrounded by Bettendorf, Iowa.
- Riverdale, Iowa, largely surrounded by Bettendorf, Iowa.
- Carter Lake, Iowa, largely surrounded by Omaha, Nebraska
- University Heights, Iowa, surrounded by Iowa City

=== Kansas ===
- Eastborough, Kansas, surrounded by Wichita

=== Michigan ===
- Center Line, Michigan, surrounded by Warren
- East Grand Rapids, Michigan, largely surrounded by Grand Rapids
- Farmington, Michigan, largely surrounded by Farmington Hills
- Hamtramck, Michigan, surrounded by Detroit; though also shares a border with Highland Park
- Highland Park, Michigan, surrounded by Detroit; though also shares a border with Hamtramck
- Lathrup Village, Michigan, surrounded by Southfield
- Rochester, Michigan, largely surrounded by Rochester Hills
- Springfield, Michigan, surrounded by Battle Creek

=== Minnesota ===
- Centerville, Minnesota, surrounded by Lino Lakes
- Hilltop, Minnesota, surrounded by Columbia Heights
- Landfall, Minnesota, surrounded by Oakdale
- Lexington, Minnesota largely surrounded by Blaine
- Long Lake, Minnesota, surrounded by Orono
- Loretto, Minnesota, surrounded by Medina
- Medicine Lake, Minnesota, surrounded by Plymouth
- Mendota, Minnesota, surrounded by Mendota Heights
- Peterson, Minnesota, surrounded by Rushford Village
- Rushford, Minnesota, surrounded by Rushford Village
- St. Bonifacius, Minnesota, surrounded by Minnetrista
- Willernie, Minnesota, surrounded by Mahtomedi

=== Missouri ===
- Avondale, Missouri, surrounded by Kansas City; though also shares a border with North Kansas City
- Baldwin Park, Missouri, surrounded by Pleasant Hill
- Birmingham, Missouri, surrounded by Kansas City
- Bella Villa, Missouri, surrounded by Lemay
- Country Club Hills, Missouri, surrounded by Jennings
- Country Life Acres, Missouri, surrounded by Town and Country
- Ferrelview, Missouri, surrounded by Kansas City
- Flordell Hills, Missouri, surrounded by Jennings
- Gladstone, Missouri, surrounded by Kansas City; though also shares a border with Oaks, Oakview, Oakwood and Oakwood Park
- Glenaire, Missouri, surrounded by Liberty
- Grandview, Missouri, largely surrounded by Kansas City
- Houston Lake, Missouri, surrounded by Kansas City
- Kimmswick, Missouri, surrounded by Imperial
- Lake Waukomis, Missouri, surrounded by Kansas City; though also shares a border with Platte Woods
- North Kansas City, Missouri, surrounded by Kansas City; though also shares a border with Avondale
- Oaks, Missouri, surrounded by Kansas City; though also shares a border with Gladstone and Oakwood
- Oakview, Missouri, surrounded by Kansas City; though also shares a border with Gladstone and Oakwood Park
- Oakwood, Missouri, surrounded by Kansas City; though also shares a border with Gladstone, Oaks and Oakwood Park
- Oakwood Park, Missouri, surrounded by Kansas City; though also shares a border with Gladstone, Oakview and Oakwood
- Peaceful Village, Missouri, surrounded by High Ridge
- Platte Woods, Missouri, surrounded by Kansas City; though also shares a border with Lake Waukomis
- Randolph, Missouri, surrounded by Kansas City
- Raytown, Missouri, largely surrounded by Kansas City

=== Montana ===
- Walkerville, Montana, surrounded by Butte

=== Nebraska ===
- Boys Town, Nebraska, surrounded by Omaha
- Ralston, Nebraska, largely surrounded by Omaha

=== New Jersey ===
- Alpha, New Jersey, surrounded by Pohatcong Township
- Branchville, New Jersey, surrounded by Frankford Township
- Chester, New Jersey, surrounded by Chester Township
- Englishtown, New Jersey, surrounded by Manalapan Township
- Farmingdale, New Jersey, surrounded by Howell Township
- Flemington, New Jersey, surrounded by Raritan Township
- Freehold, New Jersey, surrounded by Freehold Township
- Hightstown, New Jersey, surrounded by East Windsor Township
- Hopewell, New Jersey, surrounded by Hopewell Township
- Jamesburg, New Jersey, surrounded by Monroe Township
- Lakehurst, New Jersey, surrounded by Manchester Township
- Lebanon, New Jersey, surrounded by Clinton Township
- Medford Lakes, NJ surrounded by Medford, NJ
- Metuchen, New Jersey, surrounded by Edison Township
- Morristown, New Jersey, surrounded by Morris Township
- Pennington, New Jersey, surrounded by Hopewell Township
- Sussex, New Jersey, surrounded by Wantage Township
- Swedesboro, New Jersey, surrounded by Woolwich Township
- Tuckerton, New Jersey, surrounded by Little Egg Harbor Township
- Washington, New Jersey, surrounded by Washington Township
- Woodstown, New Jersey, surrounded by Pilesgrove Township

=== Ohio ===
- Bexley, Ohio, surrounded by Columbus
- Bratenahl, Ohio, surrounded by Cleveland
- Elmwood Place, Ohio, surrounded by Cincinnati, though also shares a border with St, Bernard
- Grandview Heights, Ohio, surrounded by Columbus
- Lakeline, Ohio, largely surrounded by Eastlake, though also has a coast on Lake Erie
- Marble Cliff, Ohio, surrounded by Columbus
- Minerva Park, Ohio, surrounded by Columbus
- New Boston, Ohio, largely surrounded by Portsmouth; though also has a coast on the Ohio River
- Norwood, Ohio, surrounded by Cincinnati
- Obetz, Ohio, largely surrounded by Columbus
- St. Bernard, Ohio, surrounded by Cincinnati, though also shares a border with Elmwood Place
- Timberlake, Ohio, largely surrounded by Eastlake, though also has a coast on Lake Erie
- Upper Arlington, Ohio, surrounded by Columbus
- Whitehall, Ohio, surrounded by Columbus
- Worthington, Ohio, surrounded by Columbus

=== Oklahoma ===
- Arcadia, Oklahoma, surrounded by Edmond
- Bethany, Oklahoma, surrounded by Oklahoma City; though also shares a border with Warr Acres
- Mustang, Oklahoma, surrounded by Oklahoma City
- Nichols Hills, Oklahoma, surrounded by Oklahoma City; though also shares a border with The Village
- The Village, Oklahoma, surrounded by Oklahoma City; though also shares a border with Nichols Hills
- Valley Brook, Oklahoma, surrounded by Oklahoma City
- Warr Acres, Oklahoma, surrounded by Oklahoma City; though also shares a border with Bethany
- Woodlawn Park, Oklahoma, surrounded by Bethany, Oklahoma; which is itself surrounded by Oklahoma City

=== Oregon ===
- Maywood Park, Oregon, surrounded by Portland, Oregon

=== Pennsylvania ===
- Adamsburg, Pennsylvania, surrounded by Hempfield Township
- Addison, Pennsylvania, surrounded by Addison Township
- Alexandria, Pennsylvania, surrounded by Porter Township
- Altoona, Pennsylvania, largely surrounded by Logan Township; within Altoona, there are also 2 enclaves of Logan Township
- Armagh, Pennsylvania, surrounded by East Wheatfield Township
- Arona, Pennsylvania, surrounded by Hempfield Township
- Avis, Pennsylvania, surrounded by Pine Creek Township
- Beavertown, Pennsylvania, surrounded by Beaver Township
- Bellefonte, Pennsylvania, surrounded by Spring Township
- Bellwood, Pennsylvania, surrounded by Antis Township
- Bendersville, Pennsylvania, surrounded by Menallen Township
- Berlin, Pennsylvania, surrounded by Brothersvalley Township
- Bessemer, Pennsylvania, surrounded by North Beaver Township
- Bethany, Pennsylvania, surrounded by Dyberry Township
- Biglerville, Pennsylvania, surrounded by Butler Township
- Blain, Pennsylvania, surrounded by Jackson Township
- Blairsville, Pennsylvania, surrounded by Burrell Township
- Bloomfield, Pennsylvania, surrounded by Centre Township
- Bonneauville, Pennsylvania, surrounded by Mount Pleasant Township
- Boswell, Pennsylvania, surrounded by Jenner Township
- Brisbin, Pennsylvania, largely surrounded by Woodward Township
- Broad Top City, Pennsylvania, largely surrounded by Carbon Township
- Brookville, Pennsylvania, surrounded by Snyder Township
- Bruin, Pennsylvania, surrounded by Parker Township
- Burgettstown, Pennsylvania, surrounded by Smith Township
- Burnham, Pennsylvania, surrounded by Derry Township
- Callensburg, Pennsylvania, surrounded by Licking Township
- Callimont, Pennsylvania, largely surrounded by Larimer Township
- Canton, Pennsylvania, surrounded by Canton Township
- Carmichaels, Pennsylvania, surrounded by Cumberland Township
- Cassville, Pennsylvania, surrounded by Cass Township
- Central City, Pennsylvania, surrounded by Shade Township
- Centre Hall, Pennsylvania, surrounded by Potter Township
- Chicora, Pennsylvania, largely surrounded by Donegal Township
- Clarendon, Pennsylvania, surrounded by Mead Township
- Claysville, Pennsylvania, surrounded by Donegal Township
- Clearfield, Pennsylvania, surrounded by Lawrence Township
- Clintonville, Pennsylvania, surrounded by Clinton Township
- Clymer, Pennsylvania, surrounded by Cherryhill Township
- Coalmont, Pennsylvania, surrounded by Carbon Township
- Coalport, Pennsylvania, surrounded by Beccaria Township
- Coaldale, Pennsylvania, surrounded by Broad Top Township
- Conneaut Lake, Pennsylvania, surrounded by Sadsbury Township
- Cooperstown, Pennsylvania, surrounded by Jackson Township
- Coudersport, Pennsylvania, surrounded by Eulalia Township
- Creekside, Pennsylvania, surrounded by Washington Township
- Cresson, Pennsylvania, surrounded by Cresson Township
- Curwensville, Pennsylvania, surrounded by Pike Township
- Darlington, Pennsylvania, surrounded by Darlington Township
- Dayton, Pennsylvania, surrounded by Wayne Township
- Derry, Pennsylvania, surrounded by Derry Township
- Driftwood, Pennsylvania, surrounded by Gibson Township
- DuBois, Pennsylvania, surrounded by Sandy Township
- Dudley, Pennsylvania, surrounded by Carbon Township
- Dunbar, Pennsylvania, surrounded by Dunbar Township
- Dushore, Pennsylvania, surrounded by Cherry Township
- Eagles Mere, Pennsylvania, surrounded by Shrewsbury Township
- East Lansdowne, Pennsylvania, surrounded by Upper Darby Township
- Ebensburg, Pennsylvania, surrounded by Cambria Township
- Edinboro, Pennsylvania, surrounded by Washington Township
- Elderton, Pennsylvania, surrounded by Plumcreek Township
- Eldred, Pennsylvania, surrounded by Eldred Township
- Elmhurst Township, Pennsylvania, surrounded by Roaring Brook Township
- Emporium, Pennsylvania, surrounded by Shippen Township
- Ernest, Pennsylvania, surrounded by Rayne Township
- Everett, Pennsylvania, surrounded by West Providence Township
- Export, Pennsylvania, surrounded by Murrysville Municipality
- Fairchance, Pennsylvania, surrounded by Georges Township
- Fairfield, Pennsylvania, surrounded by Hamiltonban Township
- Fairview, Pennsylvania, surrounded by Fairview Township
- Finleyville, Pennsylvania, surrounded by Union Township
- Freeburg, Pennsylvania, surrounded by Washington Township
- Garrett, Pennsylvania, surrounded by Summit Township
- Girard, Pennsylvania, surrounded by Girard Township
- Grampian, Pennsylvania, surrounded by Penn Township
- Great Bend, Pennsylvania, surrounded by Great Bend Township
- Greencastle, Pennsylvania, surrounded by Antrim Township
- Greensburg, Pennsylvania, surrounded by Hempfield Township; though also shares a border with Southwest Greensburg
- Grove City, Pennsylvania, surrounded by Pine Township
- Hallstead, Pennsylvania, surrounded by Great Bend Township
- Harrisville, Pennsylvania, surrounded by Mercer Township
- Homer City, Pennsylvania, surrounded by Center Township
- Homewood, Pennsylvania, surrounded by Big Beaver Borough
- Honey Brook, Pennsylvania, surrounded by Honey Brook Township
- Hookstown, Pennsylvania, surrounded by Greene Township
- Houtzdale, Pennsylvania, surrounded by Woodward Township
- Howard, Pennsylvania, surrounded by Howard Township
- Hughesville, Pennsylvania, surrounded by Wolf Township
- Hunker, Pennsylvania, largely surrounded by Hempfield Township
- Hyndman, Pennsylvania, surrounded by Londonderry Township
- Indian Lake, Pennsylvania, surrounded by Stonycreek Township
- Indiana, Pennsylvania, surrounded by White Township
- Irvona, Pennsylvania, surrounded by Beccaria Township
- Irwin, Pennsylvania, surrounded by North Huntingdon Township
- Jefferson, Pennsylvania. surrounded by Jefferson Township
- Jennerstown, Pennsylvania, surrounded by Jenner Township
- Johnsonburg, Pennsylvania, surrounded by Ridgway Township
- Juniata Terrace, Pennsylvania, surrounded by Granville Township
- Kane, Pennsylvania, surrounded by Wetmore Township
- Karns City, Pennsylvania, surrounded by Fairview Township
- Kennett Square, Pennsylvania, surrounded by Kennett Township
- Knox, Pennsylvania, surrounded by Beaver Township
- Lake City, Pennsylvania, surrounded by Girard Township; though also has a coast on Lake Erie
- Landisburg, Pennsylvania, surrounded by Tyrone Township
- Laporte, Pennsylvania, surrounded by Laporte Township
- LeRaysville, Pennsylvania, surrounded by Pike Township
- Liberty, Pennsylvania surrounded by Liberty Township
- Lilly, Pennsylvania, surrounded by Washington Township
- Linesville, Pennsylvania, surrounded by Pine Township
- Loganton, Pennsylvania, surrounded by Greene Township
- Loretto, Pennsylvania, surrounded by Allegheny Township
- Mahaffey, Pennsylvania, surrounded by Bell Township
- Manns Choice, Pennsylvania, surrounded by Harrison Township
- Mansfield, Pennsylvania, surrounded by Richmond Township
- Mapleton, Pennsylvania, largely surrounded by Union Township
- Marion Center, Pennsylvania, surrounded by East Mahoning Township
- Markleysburg, Pennsylvania, surrounded by Henry Clay Township
- Mars, Pennsylvania, surrounded by Adams Township
- Martinsburg, Pennsylvania, surrounded by North Woodbury Township
- McSherrystown, Pennsylvania, surrounded by Conewago Township
- Meyersdale, Pennsylvania, surrounded by Summit Township
- Middleburg, Pennsylvania, surrounded by Franklin Township
- Mifflin, Pennsylvania, surrounded by Milford Township
- Mifflintown, Pennsylvania, surrounded by Fermanagh Township
- Milesburg, Pennsylvania, surrounded by Boggs Township
- Mill Hall, Pennsylvania, surrounded by Bald Eagle Township
- Mill Village, Pennsylvania, surrounded by LeBoeuf Township
- Millheim, Pennsylvania, largely surrounded by Penn Township
- Modena, Pennsylvania, largely surrounded by East Fallowfield Township
- Monroe, Pennsylvania, surrounded by Monroe Township
- Mont Alto, Pennsylvania, surrounded by Quincy Township
- Montgomery, Pennsylvania, surrounded by Clinton Township
- Montrose, Pennsylvania, surrounded by Bridgewater Township
- Mount Holly Springs, Pennsylvania, surrounded by South Middleton Township
- Mount Jewett, Pennsylvania, surrounded by Hamlin Township
- Mount Oliver, Pennsylvania, surrounded by Pittsburgh City
- Muncy, Pennsylvania, surrounded by Muncy Creek Township
- New Albany, Pennsylvania, surrounded by Albany Township
- New Baltimore, Pennsylvania, surrounded by Allegheny Township
- New Centerville, Pennsylvania, surrounded by Milford Township
- New Galilee, Pennsylvania, surrounded by Big Beaver Borough
- New Milford, Pennsylvania, surrounded by New Milford Township
- New Oxford, Pennsylvania, surrounded by Oxford Township
- New Paris, Pennsylvania, surrounded by Napier Township
- New Stanton, Pennsylvania, surrounded by Hempfield Township
- Newburg, Pennsylvania, surrounded by Hopewell Township
- Newry, Pennsylvania, surrounded by Blair Township
- Newton Hamilton, Pennsylvania, surrounded by Wayne Township
- Nicholson, Pennsylvania, surrounded by Nicholson Township
- North East, Pennsylvania, surrounded by North East Township
- Ohiopyle, Pennsylvania, surrounded by Stewart Township
- Orbisonia, Pennsylvania, surrounded by Cromwell Township
- Orrstown, Pennsylvania, surrounded by Southampton Township
- Pennsbury Village, Pennsylvania, surrounded by Robinson Township
- Perryopolis, Pennsylvania, surrounded by Perry Township
- Petersburg, Pennsylvania, surrounded by Logan Township
- Petrolia, Pennsylvania, surrounded by Fairview Township
- Pitcairn, Pennsylvania, surrounded by Monroeville Municipality
- Pleasantville, Pennsylvania, surrounded by West St. Clair Township
- Plumville, Pennsylvania, surrounded by South Mahoning Township
- Port Allegany, Pennsylvania, surrounded by Liberty Township
- Port Matilda, Pennsylvania, surrounded by Worth Township
- Port Royal, Pennsylvania, surrounded by Milford Township
- Portage, Pennsylvania, surrounded by Portage Township
- Putnam, Pennsylvania, surrounded by Covington Township
- Rainsburg, Pennsylvania, surrounded by Colerain Township
- Ridgway, Pennsylvania, surrounded by Ridgway Township
- Roaring Spring, Pennsylvania, surrounded by Taylor Township
- Rockhill, Pennsylvania, surrounded by Cromwell Township
- Rome, Pennsylvania, surrounded by Rome Township
- Roseville, Pennsylvania, surrounded by Rutland Township
- Rouseville, Pennsylvania, surrounded by Cornplanter Township
- Rural Valley, Pennsylvania, surrounded by Cowanshannock Township
- Rutledge, Pennsylvania, largely surrounded by Ridley Township
- S.N.P.J., Pennsylvania, surrounded by North Beaver Township
- Salisbury, Pennsylvania, surrounded by Elk Lick Township
- Salladasburg, Pennsylvania, surrounded by Mifflin Township
- Saltillo, Pennsylvania, surrounded by Clay Township
- Sandy Lake, Pennsylvania, surrounded by Sandy Creek Township
- Sankertown, Pennsylvania, surrounded by Cresson Township
- Schellsburg, Pennsylvania, surrounded by Napier Township
- Seven Springs, Pennsylvania, largely surrounded by Middlecreek Township
- Shade Gap, Pennsylvania, surrounded by Dublin Township
- Shanksville, Pennsylvania, surrounded by Stonycreek Township
- Sheakleyville, Pennsylvania, surrounded by Sandy Creek Township
- Shelocta, Pennsylvania, surrounded by Armstrong Township
- Shippenville, Pennsylvania, surrounded by Elk Township
- Shirleysburg, Pennsylvania, surrounded by Shirley Township
- Slippery Rock, Pennsylvania, surrounded by Slippery Rock Township
- Smethport, Pennsylvania, surrounded by Keating Township
- Smicksburg, Pennsylvania, surrounded by West Mahoning Township
- Smithfield, Pennsylvania, surrounded by Georges Township
- Snow Shoe, Pennsylvania, surrounded by Snow Shoe Township
- Somerset, Pennsylvania, surrounded by Somerset Township
- South Greensburg, Pennsylvania, surrounded by Hempfield Township; though also shares a border with Southwest Greensburg
- Southwest Greensburg, Pennsylvania, surrounded by Hempfield Township; though also shares a border with Greensburg and South Greensburg
- Spartansburg, Pennsylvania, surrounded by Sparta Township
- Springboro, Pennsylvania, surrounded by Spring Township
- St. Clairsville, Pennsylvania, surrounded by East St. Clair Township
- St. Petersburg, Pennsylvania, surrounded by Richland Township
- Stoystown, Pennsylvania, surrounded by Quemahoning Township
- Strattanville, Pennsylvania, surrounded by Clarion Township
- Stroudsburg, Pennsylvania, largely surrounded by Stroud Township
- Sugar Grove, Pennsylvania, surrounded by Sugar Grove Township
- Summerhill, Pennsylvania, largely surrounded by Croyle Township
- Summerville, Pennsylvania, surrounded by Clover Township
- Sylvania, Pennsylvania, surrounded by Columbia Township
- Thompson, Pennsylvania, surrounded by Thompson Township
- Thompsontown, Pennsylvania, surrounded by Delaware Township
- Three Springs, Pennsylvania, surrounded by Clay Township
- Tioga, Pennsylvania, surrounded by Tioga Township
- Tionesta, Pennsylvania, surrounded by Tionesta Township
- Troutville, Pennsylvania, surrounded by Brady Township
- Troy, Pennsylvania, surrounded by Troy Township
- Tyrone, Pennsylvania, surrounded by Snyder Township
- Union City, Pennsylvania, surrounded by Union Township
- Unionville, Pennsylvania, surrounded by Union Township
- Ursina, Pennsylvania, surrounded by Lower Turkeyfoot Township
- Vanderbilt, Pennsylvania, surrounded by Dunbar Township
- Waterford, Pennsylvania, surrounded by Waterford Township
- Waynesboro, Pennsylvania, surrounded by Washington Township
- Waynesburg, Pennsylvania, surrounded by Franklin Township
- West Grove, Pennsylvania, surrounded by London Grove Township
- West Middlesex, Pennsylvania, surrounded by Shenango Township
- West Middletown, Pennsylvania, surrounded by Hopewell Township
- West Sunbury, Pennsylvania, surrounded by Clay Township
- West View, Pennsylvania, surrounded by Ross Township
- Westfield, Pennsylvania, surrounded by Westfield Township
- Wilmore, Pennsylvania, surrounded by Summerhill Township
- Worthington, Pennsylvania, surrounded by West Franklin Township
- Youngstown, Pennsylvania, surrounded by Unity Township
- Youngsville, Pennsylvania, surrounded by Brokenstraw Township
- Youngwood, Pennsylvania, surrounded by Hempfield Township

=== Tennessee ===
- Red Bank, Tennessee, surrounded by Chattanooga
- Forest Hills, surrounded by Nashville

=== Texas ===
- Alamo Heights, Texas, surrounded by San Antonio; though also shares a border with Terrell Hills
- Balcones Heights, Texas, surrounded by San Antonio
- Benbrook, Texas, largely surrounded by Fort Worth
- Bellaire, Texas, surrounded by Houston
- Beverly Hills, Texas, surrounded by Waco
- Blue Mound, Texas, surrounded by Fort Worth; though also shares a border with Sagniaw
- Castle Hills, Texas, surrounded by San Antonio
- Cockrell Hill, Texas, surrounded by Dallas
- Dalworthington Gardens, Texas, surrounded by Arlington; though also shares a border with Pantego
- Everman, Texas, largely surrounded by Fort Worth
- Forest Hill, Texas, largely surrounded by Fort Worth
- Haslet, Texas, surrounded by Fort Worth
- Highland Park, Texas, surrounded by Dallas; though also shares a border with University Park
- Hill Country Village, Texas, surrounded by San Antonio; though also shares a border with Hollywood Park
- Hollywood Park, Texas, surrounded by San Antonio; though also shares a border with Hill Country Village
- Kirby, Texas, largely surrounded by San Antonio
- Lake Worth, Texas, surrounded by Fort Worth; though also shares a border with Sansom Park
- Lakeside, Texas, largely surrounded by Fort Worth
- Leon Valley, Texas, surrounded by San Antonio
- Memorial Villages, Texas, surrounded by Houston (Note: The Memorial Villages (Spring Valley Village, Piney Point Village, Bunker Hill Village, Hedwig Village, Hilshire Village and Hunters Creek Village) are a contiguous group of independent municipalities.)
- Olmos Park, Texas, surrounded by San Antonio
- Pantego, Texas, surrounded by Arlington; though also shares a border with Dalworthington Gardens
- River Oaks, Texas, surrounded by Fort Worth; though also shares a border with Sansom Park
- Saginaw, Texas, surrounded by Fort Worth; though also shares a border with Blue Mound
- Rollingwood, Texas, surrounded by Austin; though also shares a border with West Lake Hills
- Southside Place, Texas surrounded by Houston; though also shares a border with West University Place
- Sansom Park, Texas, surrounded by Fort Worth; though also shares a border with Lake Worth and River Oaks
- Shavano Park, Texas, surrounded by San Antonio
- Sunset Valley, Texas, surrounded by Austin
- Terrell Hills, Texas, surrounded by San Antonio; though also shares a border with Alamo Heights
- The Hills, Texas, surrounded by Lakeway
- University Park, Texas, surrounded by Dallas; though also shares a border with Highland Park
- West Lake Hills, Texas, surrounded by Austin; though also shares a border with Rollingwood
- West University Place, Texas, surrounded by Houston; though also shares a border with Southside Place
- Westworth Village, Texas, surrounded by Fort Worth; though also shares a border with White Settlement
- Westover Hills, Texas, surrounded by Fort Worth
- Windcrest, Texas, largely surrounded by San Antonio
- White Settlement, Texas, surrounded by Fort Worth; though also shares a border with Westworth Village

=== Washington ===
- Beaux Arts Village, Washington, surrounded by Bellevue; though also has a coast on Lake Washington
- Ruston, Washington, surrounded by Tacoma; though also has a coast on Commencement Bay

=== Wisconsin ===
- Maple Bluff, Wisconsin, surrounded by Madison
- Monona, Wisconsin, surrounded by Madison
- North Bay, Wisconsin, surrounded by Racine; though also has a coast on Lake Michigan
- Paddock Lake, Wisconsin, largely surrounded by Salem Lakes
- Shorewood Hills, Wisconsin, surrounded by Madison
- Sturtevant, Wisconsin, surrounded by Mount Pleasant
- Thiensville, Wisconsin, surrounded by Mequon
- Union Grove, Wisconsin, largely surrounded by Yorkville

== Japan ==
- Fuchū, Hiroshima, surrounded by Hiroshima City
