= River Forest, Indiana =

- Town
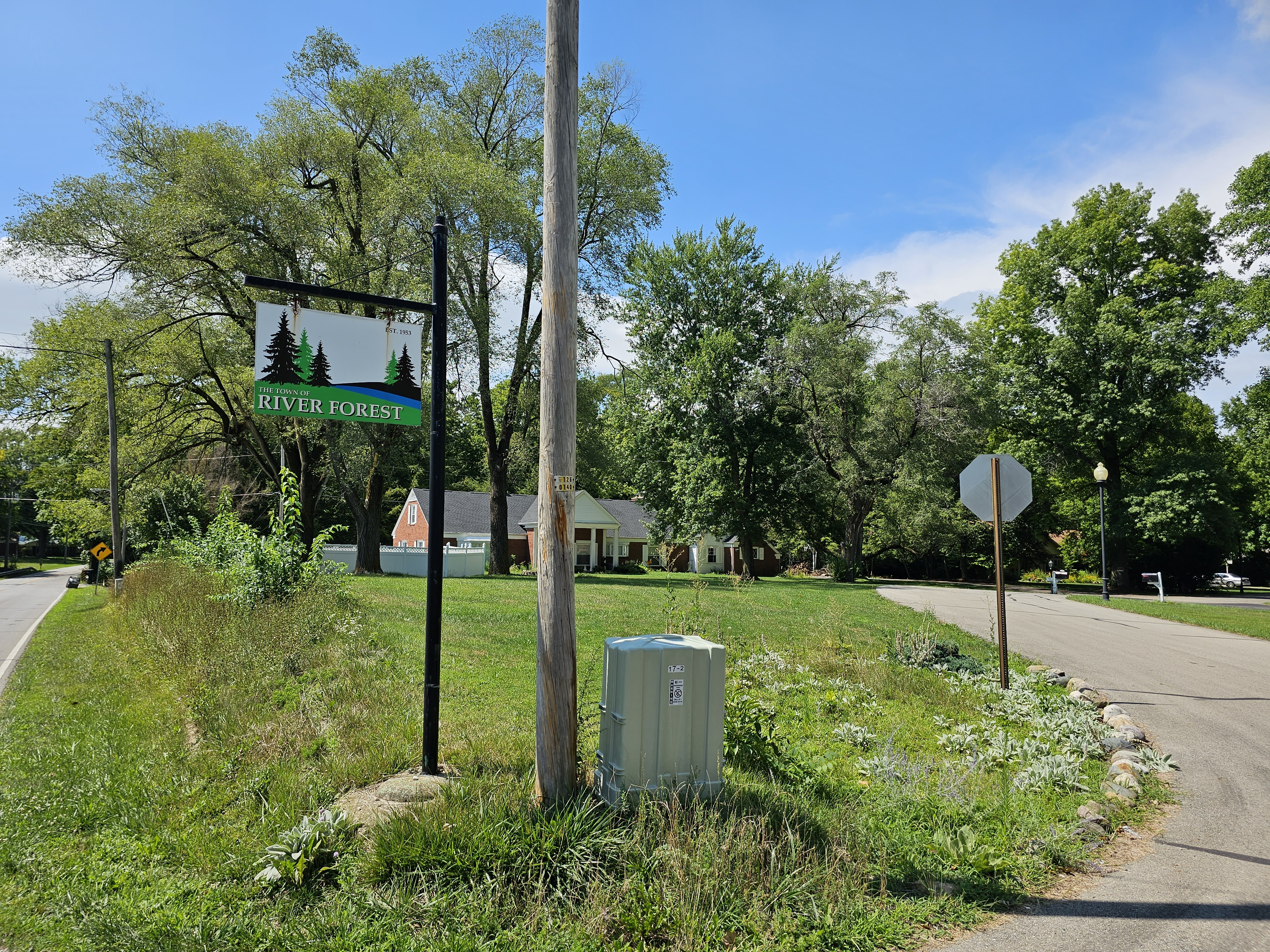

- Location in Madison County, Indiana
- Coordinates: 40°06′38″N 85°43′45″W
- Country: United States
- State: Indiana
- County: Madison
- Township: Anderson

Area
  - Total: 0.015 sq mi (0.04 km^{2})
  - Land: 0.015 sq mi (0.04 km^{2})
  - Water: 0 sq mi (0.00 km^{2})
- Elevation: 873 ft (266 m)

Population (2020)
  - Total: 26
  - Estimate (2025): 25 ▼
  - Density: 1,635.8/sq mi (631.57/km^{2})
- Time zone: UTC-5 (Eastern (EST))
  - Summer (DST): UTC-4 (EDT)
- ZIP Code: 46011
- FIPS code: 18-64728
- GNIS feature ID: 2396881

River Forest is a town in Anderson Township, Madison County, Indiana, United States. It is part of the Indianapolis–Carmel–Anderson metropolitan statistical area. The population was 26 at the 2020 census.

== Geography ==
River Forest is located in central Madison County in the northwest part of Anderson Township. It is bordered on all sides by the city of Anderson, except at its southwest corner, where it touches the northeast corner of Edgewood. The only roads in River Forest are River Forest Street, a dead-end road running north to south, and West 8th Street, which forms the southern border of the town. The town sits on a bluff overlooking the White River, which flows east to west just north of the town limits.

According to the U.S. Census Bureau, River Forest has a total area of 0.02 square miles (0.05 km^{2}), all land.

== Demographics ==
Historical population
| Census | Pop. | Note | %± |
|---|---|---|---|
| 1960 | 23 | | — |
| 1970 | 27 | | 17.4% |
| 1980 | 29 | | 7.4% |
| 1990 | 16 | | −44.8% |
| 2000 | 28 | | 75.0% |
| 2010 | 22 | | −21.4% |
| 2020 | 26 | | 18.2% |
| 2026 (est.) | 27 | ▼ | 3.8% |
U.S. Decennial Census

=== 2010 census ===
As of the census of 2010, there were 22 people, 9 households, and 8 families living in the town. The population density was 1,100.0 inhabitants per square mile (424.7/km^{2}). There were 10 housing units at an average density of 500.0 per square mile (193.1/km^{2}). The racial makeup of the town was 100.0% White.

There were 9 households, of which 11.1% had children under the age of 18 living with them, 88.9% were married couples living together, and 11.1% were non-families. 11.1% of all households were made up of individuals, and 11.1% had someone living alone who was 65 years of age or older. The average household size was 2.44 and the average family size was 2.50.

The median age in the town was 58 years. 9.1% of residents were under the age of 18; 9.1% were between the ages of 18 and 24; 18.1% were from 25 to 44; 40.9% were from 45 to 64; and 22.7% were 65 years of age or older. The gender makeup of the town was 59.1% male and 40.9% female.

=== 2000 census ===
As of the census of 2000, there were 28 people, 10 households, and 8 families living in the town. The population density was 1,745.0 inhabitants per square mile (673.7/km^{2}). There were 10 housing units at an average density of 623.2 per square mile (240.6/km^{2}). The racial makeup of the town was 100.00% White.

There were 10 households, out of which 30.0% had children under the age of 18 living with them, 80.0% were married couples living together, and 20.0% were non-families. 20.0% of all households were made up of individuals, and none had someone living alone who was 65 years of age or older. The average household size was 2.80 and the average family size was 3.25.

In the town, the population was spread out, with 28.6% under the age of 18, 3.6% from 18 to 24, 14.3% from 25 to 44, 32.1% from 45 to 64, and 21.4% who were 65 years of age or older. The median age was 50 years. For every 100 females, there were 86.7 males. For every 100 females age 18 and over, there were 81.8 males.

The median income for a household in the town was $110,555, and the median income for a family was $110,555. Males had a median income of $100,000 versus $26,250 for females. The per capita income for the town was $37,421. None of the population and none of the families were below the poverty line.

== Education ==
It is in the Anderson Community School Corporation. The district's comprehensive high school is Anderson High School.

== See also ==
- List of cities surrounded by another city
