= Anderson Township, Madison County, Indiana =

Anderson Township
- Township
- Location in Madison County
- Coordinates: 40°05′30″N 85°41′33″W
- Country: United States
- State: Indiana
- County: Madison

Government
  - Type: Indiana township

Area
  - Total: 37.25 sq mi (96.5 km^{2})
  - Land: 37.16 sq mi (96.2 km^{2})
  - Water: 0.1 sq mi (0.26 km^{2}) 0.27%
- Elevation: 863 ft (263 m)

Population (2020)
  - Total: 55,217
  - Density: 1,518.8/sq mi (586.4/km^{2})
- ZIP codes: 46011, 46012, 46013, 46016, 46017
- GNIS feature ID: 453087
- Website: andersontownship48.in.gov

Anderson Township is one of fourteen townships in Madison County, Indiana, United States. As of the 2010 census, its population was 56,436 and it contained 28,001 housing units. Aside from the exclaves of Country Club Heights, Woodlawn Heights and River Forest and the town of Edgewood, the entire township is within the city limits of Anderson.

== Geography ==
According to the 2010 census, the township has a total area of 37.25 square miles (96.5 km^{2}), of which 37.16 square miles (96.2 km^{2}) (or 99.76%) is land and 0.1 square miles (0.26 km^{2}) (or 0.27%) is water.

=== Cities, towns, villages ===
- Anderson (vast majority)
- Country Club Heights
- Edgewood
- River Forest
- Woodlawn Heights

=== Communities ===
- Brentwood at 40.097541°N 85.715255°W
- Crestlawn at 40.074764°N 85.680254°W
- Eastern Heights at 40.108931°N 85.657198°W
- Elmhurst at 40.097819°N 85.721366°W
- Extension Heights at 40.104764°N 85.660254°W
- Fairfax at 40.104209°N 85.649976°W
- Forest Hills at 40.123653°N 85.696643°W
- Glyn Ellen at 40.111153°N 85.647754°W
- Grandview at 40.118375°N 85.70831°W
- Gridley at 40.088654°N 85.652754°W
- Harmeson Heights at 40.058653°N 85.692199°W
- Hillcrest at 40.10782°N 85.664976°W
- Irondale at 40.098653°N 85.657476°W
- Lowmandale at 40.078098°N 85.663309°W
- Meadowbrook at 40.078653°N 85.678032°W
- South Edgewood at 40.097263°N 85.732755°W
- Western Village at 40.108097°N 85.717199°W

(This list is based on USGS data and may include former settlements.)

=== Cemeteries ===
The township contains these seven cemeteries: Booco, Harmeson, Maplewood, Moss, Pleasant Walk, Saint Marys, Vandeventer, Waggy and West Maplewood.

=== Major highways ===
- Interstate 69
- State Road 9
- State Road 32
- State Road 109

=== Airports and landing strips ===
- Community Hospital Airport
- Rolling Hills Convalescent Center Airport

=== Landmarks ===
- Hoosier Park Horse Track

== Education ==
- Anderson Community School Corporation

Anderson Township residents may obtain a free library card from the Anderson Public Library in Anderson.

== Political districts ==
- Indiana's 5th congressional district
- State House District 35
- State House District 36
- State House District 37
- State Senate District 25
