= Elmhurst, Indiana =

City of Elmhurst, Indiana
- City
- Interactive map of City of Elmhurst, Indiana
- Coordinates: 40.0978°N 85.7214°W
- Country: United States
- State: Indiana
- Counties: Madison
- Elevation: 870.0 ft (265.18 m)
- Time zone: UTC-5 (EST)
  - Summer (DST): UTC-4 (EDT)
- FIPS code: 18/20926
- GNIS feature ID: 434129

Elmhurst is an unincorporated, populated place in Madison County in the State of Indiana in the United States of America. It is located at latitude 40°5'52" North, longitude 85°43'17" West.
