= Hamilton, Madison County, Indiana =

Hamilton, Indiana
- Unincorporated community
- Location within Indiana Location within the United States
- Coordinates: 40°07′23″N 85°47′06″W
- Country: United States
- State: Indiana
- County: Madison
- Township: Jackson
- Elevation: 863 ft (263 m)
- ZIP code: 46011
- FIPS code: 18-30636
- GNIS feature ID: 435636

Hamilton is an unincorporated community in Jackson Township, Madison County, Indiana, United States.

== History ==
Hamilton was founded in 1836.
