= North Anderson, Indiana =

- Populated place
- Location within the state of Indiana North Anderson (the United States)
- Coordinates: 40°08′07″N 085°40′41″W
- Country: United States
- State: Indiana
- County: Madison
- Elevation: 879 ft (268 m)
- Time zone: UTC-7 (Eastern (EST))
  - Summer (DST): UTC-5 (EST)
- FIPS code: 04-54450
- GNIS feature ID: 440209

North Anderson is a populated place in Anderson Township in Madison County Indiana

== Rivers ==
Kilbuck Creek is the only major river in North Anderson

== Popular Places ==
Greenbrier Community Church is a popular place in North Anderson. Also Landmark Baptist Church and Edgewater woods are popular places. Keystone woods and Old national bank are popular places.

== Schools ==
Indiana Christian Academy is the only school in North Anderson

== Major highways ==
State Road 9

== Major Roads ==
Raible Ave is a boundary road for North Anderson and Anderson for 1.4 Miles. Hartman Rd is a boundary road for North Anderson and Anderson for 2.6 miles. Madison Ave is a major road. Broadway St is a major road. Cross St is a major road.
