= Indian Creek Railroad =

Short-line railroad in Indiana

Overview
- Headquarters: Frankton, Indiana
- Reporting mark: ICRK
- Locale: central Indiana
- Dates of operation: 1980–

Technical
- Track gauge: 4 ft 8 1/2 in (1,435 mm) standard gauge

The Indian Creek Railroad (reporting mark ICRK) is a short-line railroad in Madison County, Indiana, United States. The 4.55-mile (7.32 km) line is owned by Kokomo Grain Company, an agricultural products and services company, and connects their property at 40°11′30″N 85°44′40″W with the Norfolk Southern Railway's Marion Branch in northern Anderson, carrying outbound grain and inbound fertilizer.

The company's sole locomotive is an Alco RS-11 diesel numbered 6002, delivered new to the Southern Pacific Company in May 1959. The Indian Creek Railroad acquired it in 1982 and rebuilt it in 1996.

== History ==
The trackage was part of a line between Richmond and Logansport, completed by the Cincinnati and Chicago Railroad in 1857. This eventually became part of the system of the Pennsylvania Railroad, which operated it as the Richmond Branch, the southern half of a main line between Cincinnati and Chicago. It last saw passenger service in 1971 as part of the Penn Central Transportation Company, and survived as a continuous freight line until the formation of Conrail in 1976. At that time, the Norfolk and Western Railway acquired most of the line south of New Castle. Much of the remainder, including the present Indian Creek Railroad, remained with the trustees of the bankrupt Penn Central. However, thanks to local funding, Conrail operated the short piece between the ex-New York Central Railroad Dow Secondary north of Anderson and Frankton under contract as the Indian Creek Secondary Track, named for a minor tributary of the White River that it crosses. (The first 2.2 miles (3.5 km), mostly within yard limits, was acquired outright by Conrail, and went to the Norfolk Southern Railway in 1999.) The Indian Creek Railroad took over operations on July 20, 1980.
