= Jackson Township, Madison County, Indiana =

Jackson Township
- Township
- Location in Madison County
- Coordinates: 40°08′44″N 85°49′42″W
- Country: United States
- State: Indiana
- County: Madison

Government
  - Type: Township

Area
  - Total: 29 sq mi (75 km^{2})
  - Land: 28.92 sq mi (74.9 km^{2})
  - Water: 0.08 sq mi (0.21 km^{2}) 0.28%
- Elevation: 840 ft (256 m)

Population (2020)
  - Total: 1,954
  - Density: 65.8/sq mi (25.4/km^{2})
- ZIP codes: 46011, 46036, 46044, 46060
- GNIS feature ID: 0453454

Jackson Township is one of fourteen townships in Madison County, Indiana, United States. As of the 2010 census, its population was 1,904 and it contained 789 housing units.

The township is named for President Andrew Jackson.

== Geography ==
According to the 2010 census, the township has a total area of 29 square miles (75 km^{2}), of which 28.92 square miles (74.9 km^{2}) (or 99.72%) is land and 0.08 square miles (0.21 km^{2}) (or 0.28%) is water.

=== Unincorporated towns ===
- Hamilton at 40.123096°N 85.784978°W
- Perkinsville at 40.144206°N 85.861369°W

(This list is based on USGS data and may include former settlements.)

=== Landmarks ===
- Camp Kikthawenund

== School districts ==
- Frankton-Lapel Community Schools

== Political districts ==
- Indiana's 5th congressional district
- State House District 35
- State Senate District 20
