= Woodlawn Heights, Indiana =

- Town
- Location in Madison County, Indiana
- Coordinates: 40°07′06″N 85°41′49″W
- Country: United States
- State: Indiana
- County: Madison
- Township: Anderson

Area
  - Total: 0.11 sq mi (0.29 km^{2})
  - Land: 0.11 sq mi (0.29 km^{2})
  - Water: 0 sq mi (0.00 km^{2})
- Elevation: 843 ft (257 m)

Population (2020)
  - Total: 91
  - Estimate (2025): 90 ▼
  - Density: 809.3/sq mi (312.48/km^{2})
- Time zone: UTC-5 (Eastern (EST))
  - Summer (DST): UTC-4 (EDT)
- ZIP Code: 46011
- FIPS code: 18-85400
- GNIS feature ID: 2397755

Woodlawn Heights is a town in Anderson Township, Madison County, Indiana, United States. It is part of the Indianapolis–Carmel–Anderson metropolitan statistical area. The population was 91 at the 2020 census.

== Geography ==
Woodlawn Heights is located in central Madison County in the northern part of Anderson Township. It is bordered to the north, west, and south by the city of Anderson, and to the east by the town of Country Club Heights. Woodlawn Heights occupies some 40-foot-high (12 m) bluffs overlooking the White River, which forms the southern boundary of the town.

According to the U.S. Census Bureau, Woodlawn Heights has a total area of 0.11 square miles (0.28 km^{2}), all land.

== Demographics ==
Historical population
Census	Pop.	Note	%±
1930	19		—
1940	59		210.5%
1950	31		−47.5%
1960	29		−6.5%
1970	51		75.9%
1980	109		113.7%
1990	109		0.0%
2000	73		−33.0%
2010	79		8.2%
2020	91		15.2%
2025 (est.)	90	▼	−1.1%
U.S. Decennial Census

=== 2010 census ===
At the 2010 census there were 79 people, 34 households, and 26 families living in the town. The population density was 658.3 inhabitants per square mile (254.2/km^{2}). There were 36 housing units at an average density of 300.0 per square mile (115.8/km^{2}). The racial makeup of the town was 97.5% White, 1.3% from other races, and 1.3% from two or more races. Hispanic or Latino of any race were 3.8%.

Of the 34 households 26.5% had children under the age of 18 living with them, 70.6% were married couples living together, 5.9% had a male householder with no wife present, and 23.5% were non-families. 20.6% of households were one person and 8.8% were one person aged 65 or older. The average household size was 2.32 and the average family size was 2.69.

The median age in the town was 56.3 years. 19% of residents were under the age of 18; 1.3% were between the ages of 18 and 24; 19.1% were from 25 to 44; 38.1% were from 45 to 64; and 22.8% were 65 or older. The gender makeup of the town was 45.6% male and 54.4% female.

=== 2000 census ===
At the 2000 census there were 73 people, 33 households, and 26 families living in the town. The population density was 607.0 inhabitants per square mile (234.4/km^{2}). There were 35 housing units at an average density of 291.0 per square mile (112.4/km^{2}). The racial makeup of the town was 100.00% White.

Of the 33 households 18.2% had children under the age of 18 living with them, 81.8% were married couples living together, and 18.2% were non-families. 15.2% of households were one person and 6.1% were one person aged 65 or older. The average household size was 2.21 and the average family size was 2.44.

The age distribution was 12.3% under the age of 18, 2.7% from 18 to 24, 12.3% from 25 to 44, 50.7% from 45 to 64, and 21.9% 65 or older. The median age was 54 years. For every 100 females, there were 87.2 males. For every 100 females age 18 and over, there were 88.2 males.

The median household income was $111,324 and the median family income was $151,837. Males had a median income of $0 versus $48,438 for females. The per capita income for the town was $66,385. There were no families and 5.7% of the population living below the poverty line, including no under eighteens and none of those over 64.

== Education ==
It is in the Anderson Community School Corporation. The district's comprehensive high school is Anderson High School.

== See also ==
- List of cities surrounded by another city
