= Whiteland Raceway Park =

Oldest operating karting track in Indiana

Coordinates: 39.5616°N 86.0795°W

Whiteland Raceway Park is a karting track in Whiteland, Indiana. Opening in 1958, It is the oldest operating track in the United States.

== Expansion and modernization ==
In the fall of 2022, the raceway underwent extensive renovations and additions. The track was resurfaced and 1/2 mile of track and 7 turns were added.

The garage expanded and added 28 more pit garages.
