= Madison County, Indiana =

County in Indiana, United States

- County
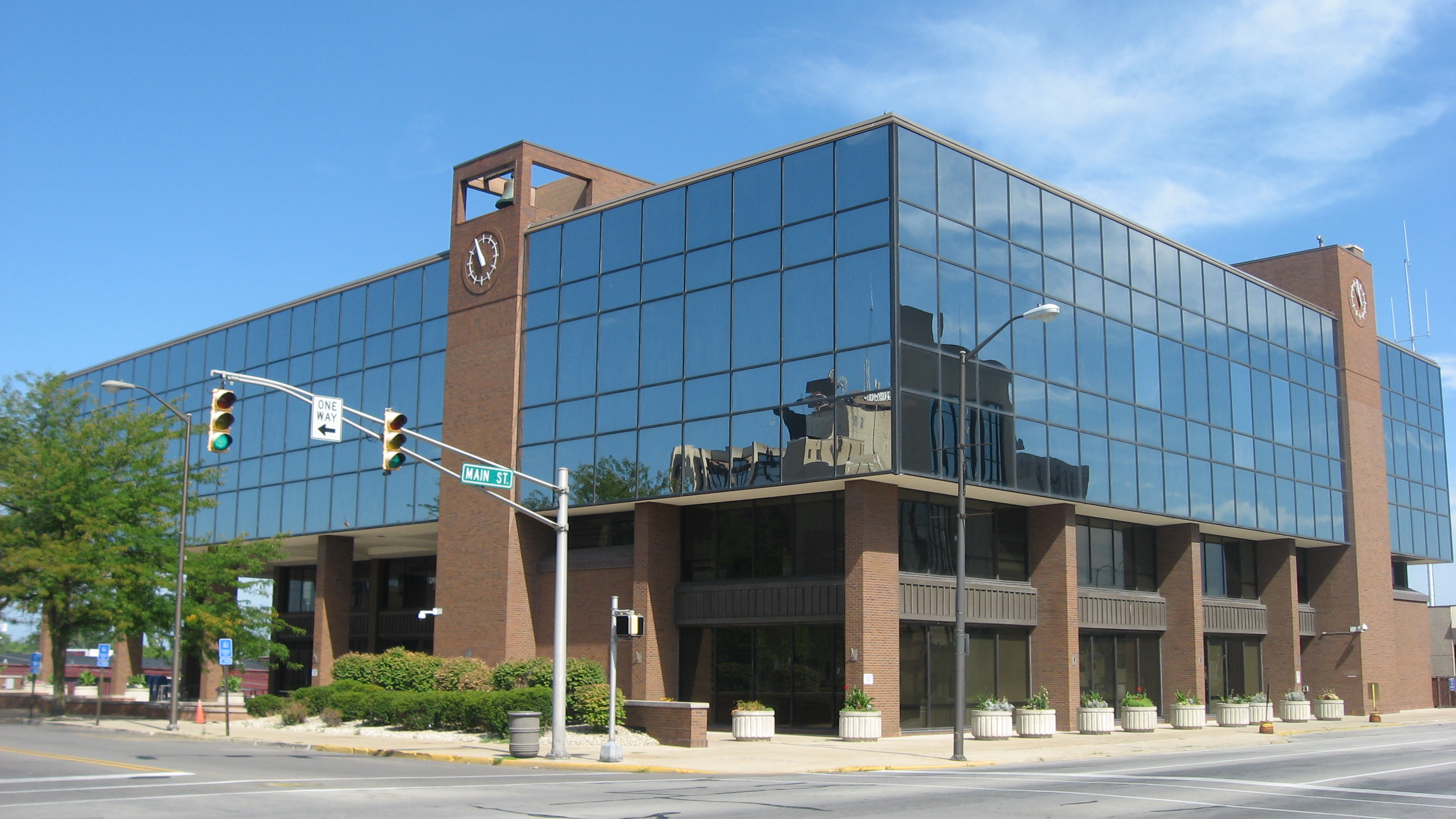
- Madison County Courthouse in Anderson

- Flag Seal

- Location within the U.S. state of Indiana
- Coordinates: 40°10′N 85°43′W
- Country: United States
- State: Indiana
- Founded: January 4, 1823 (authorized)
- Named for: James Madison
- Seat: Anderson
- Largest city: Anderson

Area
  - Total: 452.90 sq mi (1,173.0 km^{2})
  - Land: 451.92 sq mi (1,170.5 km^{2})
  - Water: 0.99 sq mi (2.6 km^{2}) 0.22%

Population (2020)
  - Total: 130,129
  - Estimate (2025): 135,088 ▲
  - Density: 287.95/sq mi (111.18/km^{2})
- Time zone: UTC−5 (Eastern)
  - Summer (DST): UTC−4 (EDT)
- Congressional district: 5th
- Website: www.madisoncounty.in.gov
- Indiana county number 48

Madison County is a county in the U.S. state of Indiana. The 2020 census states the population is standing at 130,129. The county seat since 1836 has been Anderson, one of three incorporated cities within the county. Madison County is included in the Indianapolis metropolitan area.

== History ==
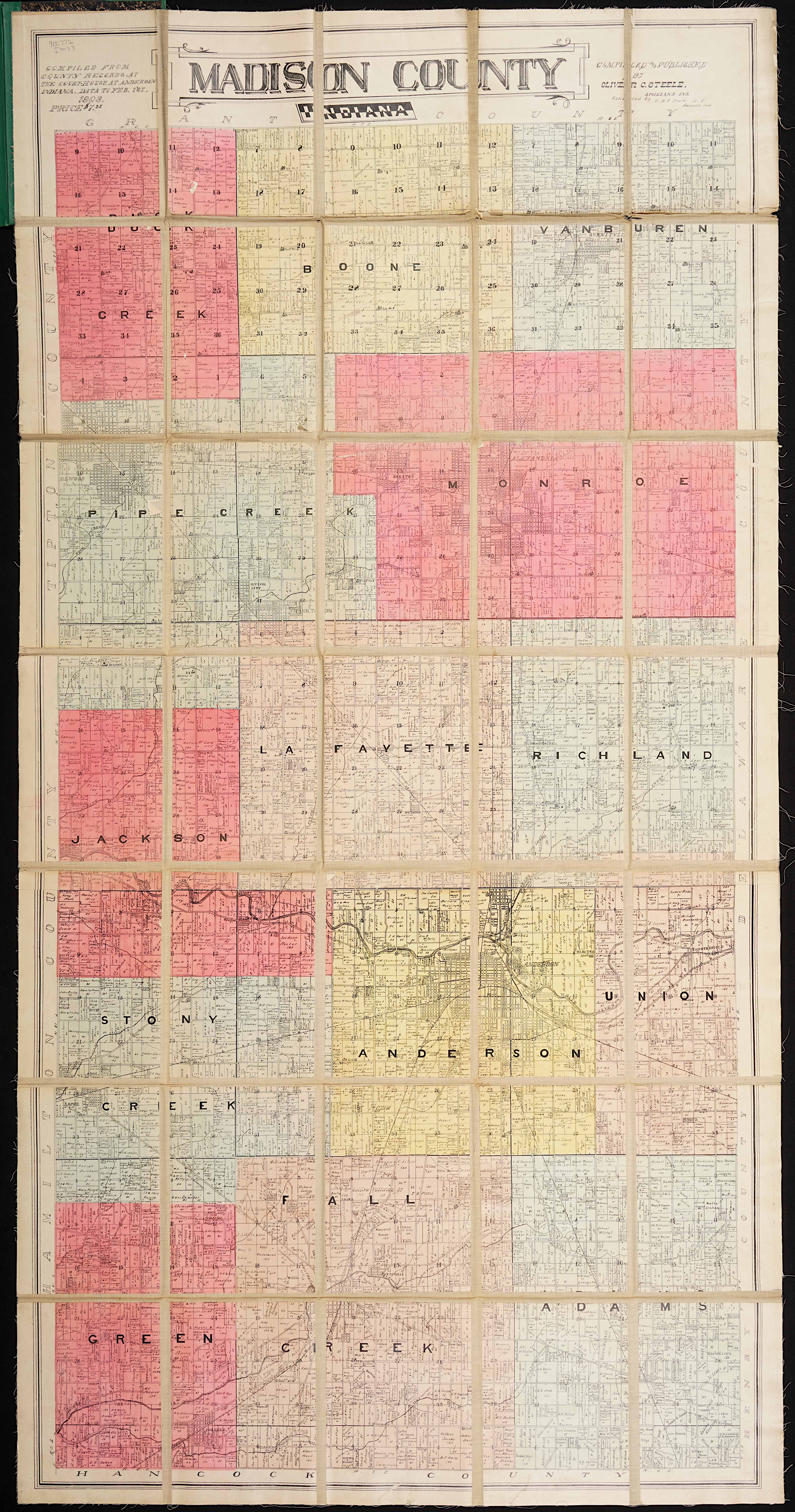
1903 map of Madison County, Indiana, showing landowners

In 1787, the fledgling United States defined the Northwest Territory, which included the area of present-day Indiana. In 1800, Congress separated Ohio from the Northwest Territory, designating the rest of the land as the Indiana Territory. President Thomas Jefferson chose William Henry Harrison as the territory's first governor, and Vincennes was established as the territorial capital. After the Michigan Territory was separated and the Illinois Territory was formed, Indiana was reduced to its current size and geography. By December 1816 the Indiana Territory was admitted to the Union as a state.

Starting in 1794, Native American titles to Indiana lands were extinguished by usurpation, purchase, or war and treaty. The United States acquired land from the Native Americans in the 1809 treaty of Fort Wayne, and by the treaty of St. Mary's in 1818 considerably more territory became property of the government. This included the future Madison County, which was authorized by the state legislature on January 4, 1823, designating areas covered by the Delaware New Purchase. No settler was allowed in the area until the government survey was completed in 1820, and in 1820 the first settlers entered the future county.

The new county was named for James Madison, co-author of The Federalist Papers and the fourth President of the United States (1809 to 1817). The then-small settlement of Pendleton was named as the county, but its non-central location soon fostered a desire for a more central location as the county seat. After considerable local competition, the town of Anderson was platted in 1827 on donated land with the stipulation that the seat be moved to that location. This move began in 1828 and was completed by 1836.

The new county was completely wooded in 1820, with stands of white oak, poplar, walnut, sycamore, oak, and fir trees. The settlers logged much of the area and cleared the remainder through burning; at present its terrain is completely devoted to agriculture or urban development, except for stands of brush in drainages.

The county's first courthouse was authorized in the county's 1828 session, but this authorization was revoked in 1829. In 1831 a second authorization was passed, and the completed building was placed in service the following year.

During the Indiana gas boom, natural gas deposits were discovered in the county in 1887, at Alexandria, and Anderson. The offer of free natural gas brought several factories to the county.

== Geography ==
The county's terrain is nearly flat, with the exception of hilly areas along the White River and Fall Creek. The highest terrain (around 1,010 feet/310 meters ASL) is a ridgeline at the county's SE corner. The county is drained by the west branch of the White River, flowing west-southwestward through the county's lower central portion. Other drainages include Fall Creek, flowing west- and southwestward through the southern part of the county; Pipe Creek, which rises in Delaware County and flows southwestward through the county's NW corner; and Lick Creek, which rises in Henry County and flows westward through the county's SW portion.

According to the 2010 United States census, the county has a total area of 452.90 square miles (1,173.0 km^{2}), of which 451.92 square miles (1,170.5 km^{2}) (or 99.78%) is land and 0.99 square miles (2.6 km^{2}) (or 0.22%) is water.

=== Adjacent counties ===
- Grant County - north
- Delaware County - east
- Henry County - southeast
- Hancock County - south
- Hamilton County - west
- Tipton County - northwest

=== Protected areas ===
- Mounds State Park

=== Cities ===
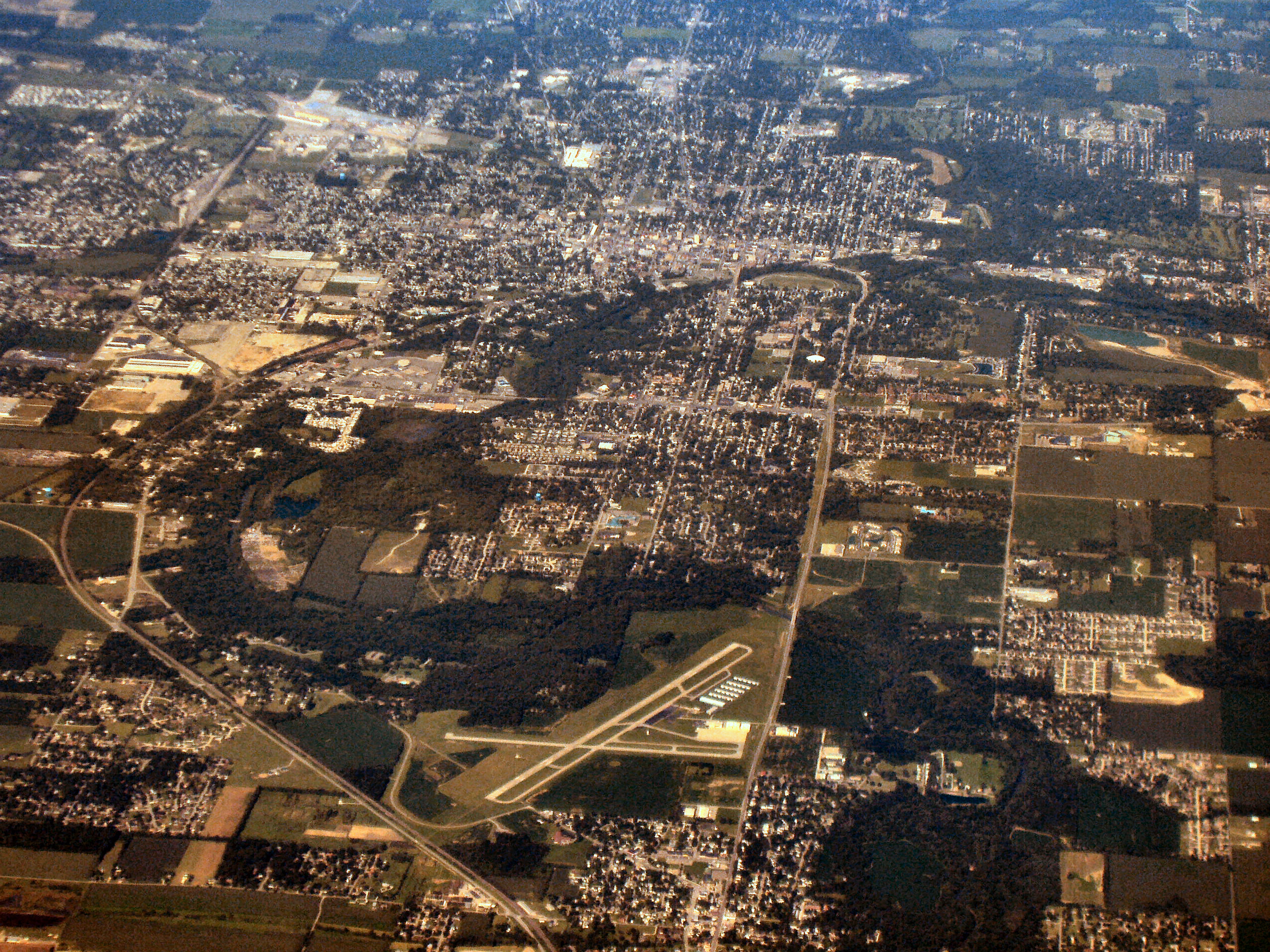
Aerial view of Anderson, looking west

- Alexandria
- Anderson (county seat)
- Elwood (part)

=== Towns ===
- Chesterfield
- Country Club Heights
- Edgewood
- Frankton
- Ingalls
- Lapel
- Markleville
- Orestes
- Pendleton
- River Forest
- Summitville
- Woodlawn Heights

=== Unincorporated towns ===
- Alfont
- Alliance
- College Corner
- Dundee
- Edgewood Village
- Emporia
- Fishersburg
- Florida
- Gimco City
- Hamilton
- Hardscrabble
- Huntsville
- Idlewold
- Leisure
- Linwood
- Moonville
- North Anderson
- Ovid (also known as New Columbus)
- Perkinsville
- Prosperity
- Rigdon
- South Elwood

=== Townships ===
- Adams
- Anderson
- Boone
- Duck Creek
- Fall Creek
- Green
- Jackson
- Lafayette
- Monroe
- Pipe Creek
- Richland
- Stony Creek
- Union
- Van Buren

=== Major highways ===
- Interstate 69
- U.S. Route 36
- State Road 9
- State Road 13
- State Road 28
- State Road 32
- State Road 37
- State Road 38
- State Road 67
- State Road 109
- State Road 128
- State Road 232
- State Road 236

=== Railroads ===
- Central Indiana and Western Railroad
- CSX Transportation
- Indian Creek Railroad
- Norfolk Southern Railway

== Climate and weather ==
Anderson, Indiana

Climate chart (precipitation, max. and min. temperature)
J	F	M	A	M	J	J	A	S	O	N	D
2.1 33 18	2.3 38 23	3.2 49 32	3.8 61 41	4.1 72 51	4.2 80 60	4.3 84 64	3.4 82 62	3 75 55	2.8 64 44	3.7 50 35	3 37 24
- █ Average max. and min. temperatures in °F
- █ Precipitation totals in inches
- Source: The Weather Channel
Metric conversion
J	F	M	A	M	J	J	A	S	O	N	D
53 1 −8	58 3 −5	82 9 0	98 16 5	104 22 11	107 27 16	109 29 18	87 28 17	75 24 13	70 18 7	93 10 2	75 3 −4
- █ Average max. and min. temperatures in °C
- █ Precipitation totals in mm

In recent years, average temperatures in Anderson have ranged from a low of 18 °F (−8 °C) in January to a high of 84 °F (29 °C) in July, although a record low of −24 °F (−31 °C) was recorded in January 1985 and a record high of 105 °F (41 °C) was recorded in July 1954. Average monthly precipitation ranged from 2.09 inches (53 mm) in January to 4.28 inches (109 mm) in July.

== Government ==
2020 presidential election results by precinct Trump—40-50% Trump—50-60% Trump—60-70% Trump—70-80% Trump—80-90% Trump—90-100% Biden—40-50% Biden—50-60% Biden—60-70% Biden—70-80% Biden—80-90%

The county government is a constitutional body, and is granted specific powers by the Constitution of Indiana, and by the Indiana Code.

County Council: The legislative branch of the county government; controls spending and revenue collection in the county. Representatives are elected to four-year terms from county districts. They set salaries, the annual budget, and special spending. The council has limited authority to impose local taxes, in the form of an income and property tax that is subject to state level approval, excise taxes, and service taxes.

Board of Commissioners: The executive body of the county; commissioners are elected county-wide to staggered four-year terms. One commissioner serves as president. The commissioners execute acts legislated by the council, collect revenue, and manage the county government.

Court: The county maintains a small claims court that handles civil cases. The judge on the court is elected to a term of four years and must be a member of the Indiana Bar Association. The judge is assisted by a constable who is also elected to a four-year term. In some cases, court decisions can be appealed to the state level circuit court.

County Officials: The county has other elected offices, including sheriff, coroner, auditor, treasurer, recorder, surveyor, and circuit court clerk. These officers are elected to four-year terms. Members elected to county government positions are required to declare party affiliations and to be residents of the county.

Madison County is part of Indiana's 5th congressional district; Indiana Senate districts 20, 25 and 26; and Indiana House of Representatives districts 35, 36 and 37.

United States presidential election results for Madison County, Indiana
Year	Republican		Democratic		Third party(ies)	
Year	No.	%	No.	%	No.	%
1888	3,436	45.26%	3,928	51.74%	228	3.00%
1892	5,387	45.91%	5,733	48.85%	615	5.24%
1896	8,388	51.96%	7,590	47.02%	164	1.02%
1900	9,891	52.47%	8,298	44.02%	661	3.51%
1904	9,697	53.65%	6,681	36.96%	1,696	9.38%
1908	7,481	43.48%	8,296	48.22%	1,427	8.29%
1912	1,771	11.24%	6,676	42.37%	7,310	46.39%
1916	7,449	41.96%	8,106	45.66%	2,197	12.38%
1920	15,704	49.76%	13,325	42.22%	2,533	8.03%
1924	18,447	57.64%	12,061	37.69%	1,495	4.67%
1928	23,083	64.45%	12,496	34.89%	235	0.66%
1932	18,803	44.92%	22,069	52.72%	988	2.36%
1936	16,644	37.41%	27,347	61.46%	504	1.13%
1940	22,382	45.91%	26,111	53.56%	261	0.54%
1944	21,381	46.10%	24,488	52.80%	514	1.11%
1948	18,917	43.04%	24,439	55.61%	592	1.35%
1952	28,730	52.84%	25,125	46.21%	519	0.95%
1956	30,329	54.21%	25,408	45.42%	206	0.37%
1960	31,098	52.31%	28,154	47.36%	193	0.32%
1964	24,171	41.87%	33,325	57.73%	233	0.40%
1968	28,726	48.39%	23,886	40.23%	6,756	11.38%
1972	39,036	64.92%	20,921	34.79%	177	0.29%
1976	32,437	51.63%	29,811	47.45%	572	0.91%
1980	35,582	57.31%	23,554	37.93%	2,956	4.76%
1984	36,510	61.87%	22,254	37.71%	250	0.42%
1988	32,596	56.95%	24,443	42.70%	202	0.35%
1992	23,479	39.76%	22,276	37.72%	13,303	22.53%
1996	23,151	43.10%	23,772	44.25%	6,797	12.65%
2000	27,956	53.54%	23,403	44.82%	857	1.64%
2004	32,526	59.29%	21,882	39.89%	447	0.81%
2008	26,403	45.96%	30,152	52.49%	889	1.55%
2012	26,769	50.98%	24,407	46.48%	1,334	2.54%
2016	32,376	59.54%	18,595	34.20%	3,406	6.26%
2020	31,215	60.16%	19,524	37.63%	1,151	2.22%
2024	34,837	62.35%	19,824	35.48%	1,211	2.17%

== Demographics ==
Historical population
Census	Pop.	Note	%±
1830	2,238		—
1840	8,874		296.5%
1850	12,375		39.5%
1860	16,518		33.5%
1870	22,770		37.8%
1880	27,527		20.9%
1890	36,487		32.5%
1900	70,470		93.1%
1910	65,224		−7.4%
1920	69,151		6.0%
1930	82,888		19.9%
1940	88,575		6.9%
1950	103,911		17.3%
1960	125,819		21.1%
1970	138,451		10.0%
1980	139,336		0.6%
1990	130,669		−6.2%
2000	133,358		2.1%
2010	131,636		−1.3%
2020	130,129		−1.1%
2025 (est.)	135,088	▲	3.8%
US Decennial Census; 1790-1960 1900-1990; 1990-2000 2010-2019

=== Racial and ethnic composition ===
Madison County, Indiana – Racial and ethnic composition Note: the US Census treats Hispanic/Latino as an ethnic category. This table excludes Latinos from the racial categories and assigns them to a separate category. Hispanics/Latinos may be of any race.
Race / Ethnicity (NH = Non-Hispanic)	Pop 1980	Pop 1990	Pop 2000	Pop 2010	Pop 2020	% 1980	% 1990	% 2000	% 2010	% 2020
White alone (NH)	128,345	119,207	118,874	113,577	106,928	92.11%	91.23%	89.14%	86.28%	82.17%
Black or African American alone (NH)	9,586	9,823	10,437	10,887	10,116	6.88%	7.52%	7.83%	8.27%	7.77%
Native American or Alaska Native alone (NH)	155	286	285	253	259	0.11%	0.22%	0.21%	0.19%	0.20%
Asian alone (NH)	294	407	460	547	649	0.21%	0.31%	0.34%	0.42%	0.50%
Native Hawaiian or Pacific Islander alone (NH)	x	x	20	41	42	x	x	0.01%	0.03%	0.03%
Other race alone (NH)	167	61	134	178	483	0.12%	0.05%	0.10%	0.14%	0.37%
Mixed race or Multiracial (NH)	x	x	1,155	1,964	5,389	x	x	0.87%	1.49%	4.14%
Hispanic or Latino (any race)	789	885	1,993	4,189	6,263	0.57%	0.68%	1.49%	3.18%	4.81%
Total	139,336	130,669	133,358	131,636	130,129	100.00%	100.00%	100.00%	100.00%	100.00%

=== 2020 census ===
As of the 2020 census, the county had a population of 130,129. The median age was 41.5 years. 21.7% of residents were under the age of 18 and 19.2% of residents were 65 years of age or older. For every 100 females there were 100.4 males, and for every 100 females age 18 and over there were 98.3 males age 18 and over.

The racial makeup of the county was 83.5% White, 7.9% Black or African American, 0.3% American Indian and Alaska Native, 0.5% Asian, <0.1% Native Hawaiian and Pacific Islander, 2.4% from some other race, and 5.4% from two or more races. Hispanic or Latino residents of any race comprised 4.8% of the population.

75.4% of residents lived in urban areas, while 24.6% lived in rural areas.

There were 52,511 households in the county, of which 28.4% had children under the age of 18 living in them. Of all households, 43.8% were married-couple households, 19.3% were households with a male householder and no spouse or partner present, and 28.7% were households with a female householder and no spouse or partner present. About 30.1% of all households were made up of individuals and 13.5% had someone living alone who was 65 years of age or older.

There were 58,784 housing units, of which 10.7% were vacant. Among occupied housing units, 69.3% were owner-occupied and 30.7% were renter-occupied. The homeowner vacancy rate was 1.9% and the rental vacancy rate was 10.1%.

== 2010 census ==
As of the 2010 United States census, there were 131,636 people, 51,927 households, and 34,319 families in the county. The population density was 291.3 inhabitants per square mile (112.5/km^{2}). There were 59,068 housing units at an average density of 130.7 per square mile (50.5/km^{2}). The racial makeup of the county was 87.7% white, 8.3% black or African American, 0.4% Asian, 0.2% American Indian, 1.5% from other races, and 1.8% from two or more races. Those of Hispanic or Latino origin made up 3.2% of the population. In terms of ancestry, 21.5% were German, 12.5% were American, 11.5% were Irish, and 10.4% were English.

Of the 51,927 households, 31.3% had children under the age of 18 living with them, 47.4% were married couples living together, 13.6% had a female householder with no husband present, 33.9% were non-families, and 28.3% of all households were made up of individuals. The average household size was 2.41 and the average family size was 2.93. The median age was 39.2 years.

The median income for a household in the county was $47,697 and the median income for a family was $53,906. Males had a median income of $41,834 versus $31,743 for females. The per capita income for the county was $21,722. About 11.2% of families and 14.7% of the population were below the poverty line, including 22.6% of those under age 18 and 7.7% of those age 65 or over.

== Education ==
School districts include:

- Alexandria Community School Corporation
- Anderson Community School Corporation
- Elwood Community School Corporation
- Frankton-Lapel Community Schools
- Madison-Grant United School Corporation
- South Madison Community School Corporation

== See also ==
- National Register of Historic Places listings in Madison County, Indiana
