= Country Club Heights, Indiana =

- Town
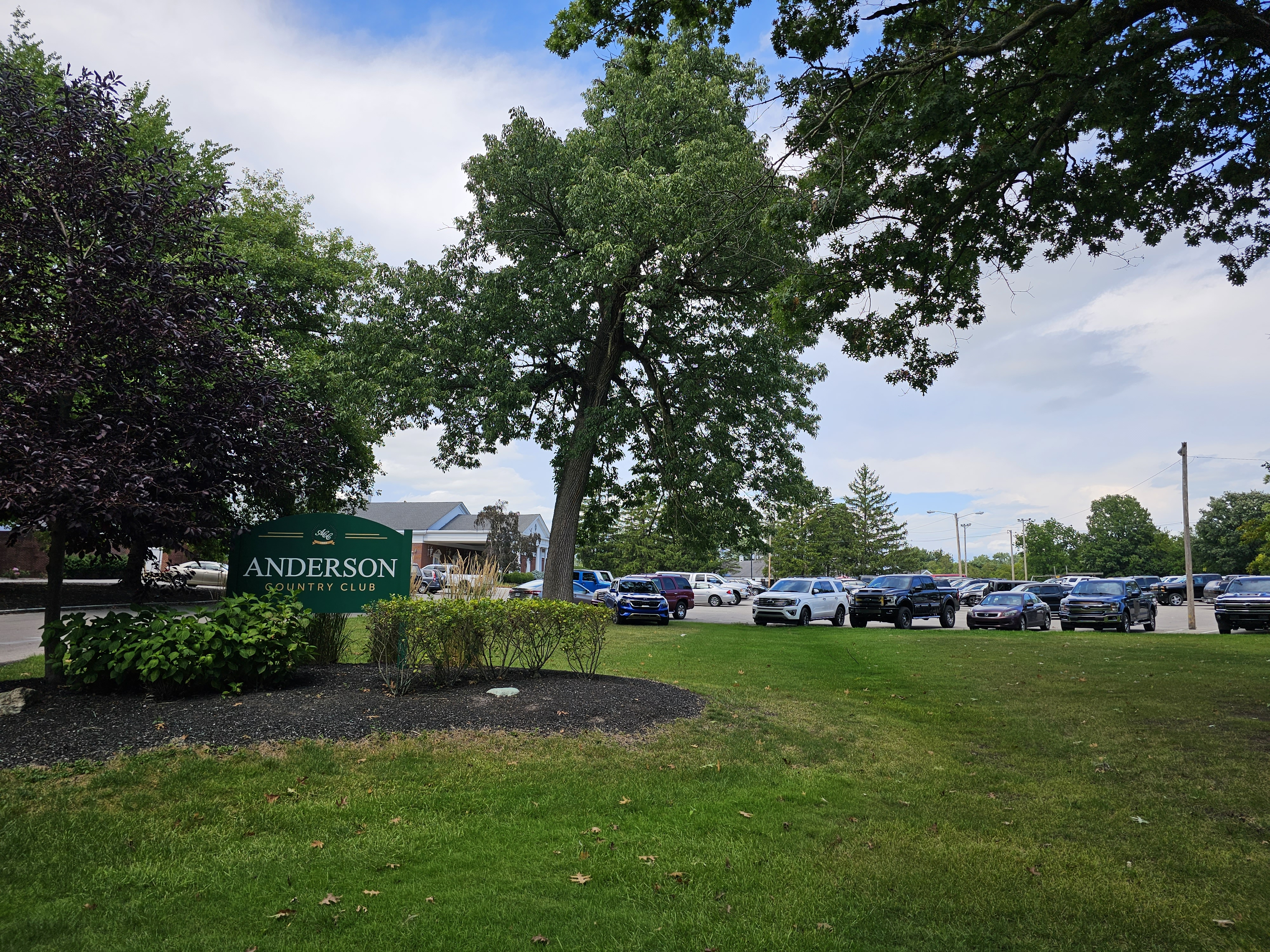

- Location in Madison County, Indiana
- Coordinates: 40°07′32″N 85°41′15″W
- Country: United States
- State: Indiana
- County: Madison
- Township: Anderson
- Incorporated: September 2, 1950

Area
  - Total: 0.29 sq mi (0.76 km^{2})
  - Land: 0.29 sq mi (0.76 km^{2})
  - Water: 0 sq mi (0.00 km^{2})
- Elevation: 879 ft (268 m)

Population (2020)
  - Total: 98
  - Estimate (2025): 99 ▲
  - Density: 334.1/sq mi (128.98/km^{2})
- Time zone: UTC-5 (EST)
  - Summer (DST): UTC-5 (EST)
- ZIP Code: 46011
- Area code: 765
- FIPS code: 18-15364
- GNIS feature ID: 2396665
- Website: townofcountryclubheights.com

Country Club Heights is a town in Anderson Township, Madison County, Indiana, United States. The population was 98 at the 2020 census.

== Geography ==
Country Club Heights is located is in central Madison County at 40°7′31″N 85°41′15″W (40.125408, -85.687556). It is bordered to the southwest by the town of Woodlawn Heights and in all other directions by the city of Anderson. Most notably Country Club Heights is home to Anderson Country Club formed in 1902 and is the 3rd oldest club in the state of Indiana.

According to the U.S. Census Bureau, Country Club Heights has a total area of 0.29 square miles (0.75 km^{2}), all land. The White River forms the southern border of the town.

== Demographics ==
Historical population
Census	Pop.	Note	%±
1960	83		—
1970	118		42.2%
1980	97		−17.8%
1990	112		15.5%
2000	91		−18.7%
2010	79		−13.2%
2020	98		24.1%
2025 (est.)	99	▲	1.0%
U.S. Decennial Census

=== 2010 census ===
As of the census of 2010, there were 79 people, 35 households, and 26 families living in the town. The population density was 282.1 inhabitants per square mile (108.9/km^{2}). There were 40 housing units at an average density of 142.9 per square mile (55.2/km^{2}). The racial makeup of the town was 100.0% White.

There were 35 households, of which 14.3% had children under the age of 18 living with them, 71.4% were married couples living together, 2.9% had a female householder with no husband present, and 25.7% were non-families. 25.7% of all households were made up of individuals, and 14.3% had someone living alone who was 65 years of age or older. The average household size was 2.26 and the average family size was 2.62.

The median age in the town was 57.9 years. 16.5% of residents were under the age of 18; 3.8% were between the ages of 18 and 24; 12.7% were from 25 to 44; 36.7% were from 45 to 64; and 30.4% were 65 years of age or older. The gender makeup of the town was 51.9% male and 48.1% female.

=== 2000 census ===
As of the census of 2000, there were 91 people, 39 households, and 32 families living in the town. The population density was 297.8 inhabitants per square mile (115.0/km^{2}). There were 40 housing units at an average density of 130.9 per square mile (50.5/km^{2}). The racial makeup of the town was 95.60% White, 3.30% African American, 1.10% from other races. Hispanic or Latino of any race were 1.10% of the population.

There were 39 households, out of which 25.6% had children under the age of 18 living with them, 79.5% were married couples living together, and 17.9% were non-families. 15.4% of all households were made up of individuals, and 7.7% had someone living alone who was 65 years of age or older. The average household size was 2.33 and the average family size was 2.56.

In the town, the population was spread out, with 17.6% under the age of 18, 1.1% from 18 to 24, 15.4% from 25 to 44, 44.0% from 45 to 64, and 22.0% who were 65 years of age or older. The median age was 49 years. For every 100 females, there were 111.6 males. For every 100 females age 18 and over, there were 102.7 males.

The median income for a household in the town was $97,723, and the median income for a family was $99,211. Males had a median income of $88,136 versus $45,417 for females. The per capita income for the town was $52,273. There were no families and 4.3% of the population living below the poverty line, including no under eighteens and none of those over 64.

== Education ==
It is in the Anderson Community School Corporation. The district's comprehensive high school is Anderson High School.

== See also ==
- List of cities surrounded by another city
