= Melvin E. Biddle =

United States Army Medal of Honor recipient (1923–2010)

Melvin Earl Biddle
- Born: November 28, 1923; Daleville, Indiana
- Died: December 16, 2010 (aged 87); Anderson, Indiana
- Burial place: Memorial Park Cemetery, Anderson, Indiana
- Military career
- Allegiance: United States of America
- Branch: United States Army
- Service years: 1943–1945
- Rank: Corporal
- Nickname: Bud
- Units: 1st Battalion, 517th Parachute Infantry Regiment
- Conflicts: World War II • Battle of the Bulge
- Awards: Medal of Honor; Bronze Star; Purple Heart

Melvin Earl "Bud" Biddle (November 28, 1923 – December 16, 2010) was a United States Army soldier and a recipient of the United States military's highest decoration—the Medal of Honor—for his actions in World War II.

== Early life ==
Biddle was born on November 28, 1923, in Daleville, Indiana, to Owen J. and Blanche Olive (Bowen) Biddle. He had two brothers, Ralph and Lee, and three sisters, Marie, Carolyn, and Eileen. A lifelong resident of the area, Biddle attended elementary school in Daleville and graduated from Anderson High School in nearby Anderson, Indiana. He worked for Delco Remy in Anderson until being drafted into the U.S. Army in January 1943.

== Military service ==
By December 23, 1944, Biddle was serving in Europe as a private first class in Company B of the 1st Battalion, 517th Parachute Infantry Regiment; which was attached to the 82nd Airborne Division at the time. On that day and the following day during the Battle of the Bulge, near Soy, Belgium (now a deelgemeente of Érezée), he reconnoitered the German lines alone, killed three enemy snipers, and silenced four hostile machine gun emplacements. A week later, he was wounded in the neck by shrapnel which just missed his jugular vein. After recovering in England for several weeks, he headed back to his unit and on the way learned through an article in Stars and Stripes that he would be awarded the Medal of Honor.

For his actions during the battle near Soy, Biddle was awarded the Medal of Honor at the White House on October 30, 1945, by President Harry Truman. When presenting the medal to Biddle, Truman whispered "People don't believe me when I tell them that I'd rather have one of these than be President."

Biddle was later promoted to corporal. In addition to the Medal of Honor, he also received the Bronze Star and Purple Heart.

== Later years and personal life ==
On December 1, 1946, Biddle married his childhood sweetheart, Leona Elsie Allen. The couple had two daughters, Elissa and Marsha.

After leaving the military, Biddle returned to Indiana and worked for the Department of Veterans Affairs. He helped distribute loans and benefits to veterans for 26 years until his retirement. He also served on the Anderson City Council.

Biddle rarely spoke of his Medal of Honor action. He gave occasional interviews and appeared at events honoring veterans but preferred to lead a more private life. He was an avid golfer and a member of the local Veterans of Foreign Wars post.

Biddle died of congestive heart failure on December 16, 2010, at Saint John's Medical Center in Anderson following a sudden illness. Aged 87 at his death, he is buried in Anderson's Memorial Park Cemetery on December 20. Biddle's family requested that his funeral be free of military observances for their beliefs as Jehovah's Witnesses. His death date was the 66th anniversary of the start of the Battle of the Bulge, in which he earned the Medal of Honor, and he was Indiana's last surviving Medal of Honor recipient from World War II.

== Medal of Honor citation ==
Biddle's official Medal of Honor citation reads:

He displayed conspicuous gallantry and intrepidity in action against the enemy near Soy, Belgium, on 23 and 24 December 1944. Serving as lead scout during an attack to relieve the enemy-encircled town of Hotton, he aggressively penetrated a densely wooded area, advanced 400 yards until he came within range of intense enemy rifle fire, and within 20 yards of enemy positions killed 3 snipers with unerring marksmanship. Courageously continuing his advance an additional 200 yards, he discovered a hostile machine-gun position and dispatched its 2 occupants. He then located the approximate position of a well-concealed enemy machine-gun nest, and crawling forward threw hand grenades which killed two Germans and fatally wounded a third. After signaling his company to advance, he entered a determined line of enemy defense, coolly and deliberately shifted his position, and shot 3 more enemy soldiers. Undaunted by enemy fire, he crawled within 20 yards of a machine-gun nest, tossed his last hand grenade into the position, and after the explosion charged the emplacement firing his rifle. When night fell, he scouted enemy positions alone for several hours and returned with valuable information which enabled our attacking infantry and armor to knock out 2 enemy tanks. At daybreak he again led the advance and, when flanking elements were pinned down by enemy fire, without hesitation made his way toward a hostile machine-gun position and from a distance of 50 yards killed the crew and 2 supporting riflemen. The remainder of the enemy, finding themselves without automatic weapon support, fled panic stricken. Pfc. Biddle's intrepid courage and superb daring during his 20-hour action enabled his battalion to break the enemy grasp on Hotton with a minimum of casualties.

== See also ==
- List of Medal of Honor recipients for World War II
