= Anderson Community School Corporation =

School district in Madison County, Indiana, US

Anderson Community Schools Corperation
- Anderson, IN

Information
- Former name: Anderson Public Schools
- Established: 1873
- Superintendent: Joe Cronk (out-going)
- President: Mindy Webb
- Campuses: 13

Anderson Community School Corporation, is a school district located in Anderson, Indiana.

The majority of Anderson is in this school district. The district also includes Country Club Heights, Edgewood, River Forest, Woodlawn Heights, and the majority of Chesterfield.

== Schools ==
=== Elementary schools (Grades: K - 4) ===
- Anderson Elementary School
- Eastside Elementary School
- Edgewood Elementary School
- Erskine Elementary School
- Tenth Street Elementary School
- Valley Grove Elementary School
- Southview Preschool Center

=== Middle schools (Grades: 5 - 8) ===
- Anderson Intermediate School (Grades: 5 - 6)
- Highland Junior High School (Grades: 7 - 8)

=== High school (Grades: 9 - 12) ===
- Anderson High School (Indiana)

== History ==
Originally there were three public high schools: the original Anderson High School, which opened in 1873, Madison Heights High School, which was founded in 1956, and Highland High School, which was also built in 1955 and was a rural school until it was incorporated into Anderson in the 1970s. In late 1996/early 1997 Anderson Community School Corporation (ACSC) determined that the old Anderson High School building, located at 14th and Lincoln streets, was not in adequate condition to continue classes. It was decided that that building would close and the Madison Heights High School would be renamed Anderson High School. On June 25, 1999, there was a fire at the old Anderson High School building due to an unknown cause; the historic Wigwam gym was spared. Two schools were located outside Anderson city limits, but have since been incorporated into the Anderson Community School System. These are Killbuck and Valley Grove Elementary Schools.

Because of budget cuts, South Side Middle School, Robinson Elementary School, and others closed at the end of the 2008–2009 school year.

On Tuesday, December 15, 2009, due to budget cuts, the Anderson Schools Board of Education and Interim Superintendent announced by a vote of 5 to 2 the district would be going back to one high school, one middle school, and six elementary schools. On Tuesday, January 12, 2010, the School Board Announced by a vote of 6 to 1 The current Anderson High School would now be the lone high school campus in the school district and Highland High School would become the lone junior high school in the district housing grades 6–8 (later 7–8) with Anderson High School holding grades 9–12. North Side and East Side Middle Schools were closed.
