= List of municipalities in Indiana =

Map of the United States with Indiana highlighted

Indiana is a state located in the Midwestern United States. As of the 2021 census estimate, the state had 6,805,985 residents. There are 569 municipalities in 92 counties.

Under Indiana law, a municipality must have a minimum of 2,000 people to incorporate as a city. Except as noted, all cities are "third-class" cities with a five or seven-member city council and an elected clerk-treasurer. "Second-class" cities had a population of at least 34,000 and up to 600,000 at time of designation, and have a nine-member city council and an elected clerk. Indianapolis is the only "first-class" city in Indiana under state law, making it subject to a consolidated city-county government known as Unigov. A town is differentiated from a city in that a town can not become a city until it has a population of at least 2,000. The form of government is also different from that of a city in that the council is both the legislative and executive branches of government. The mayor is selected by the council from within its ranks and operates as a first among equals.

== Most populous cities ==
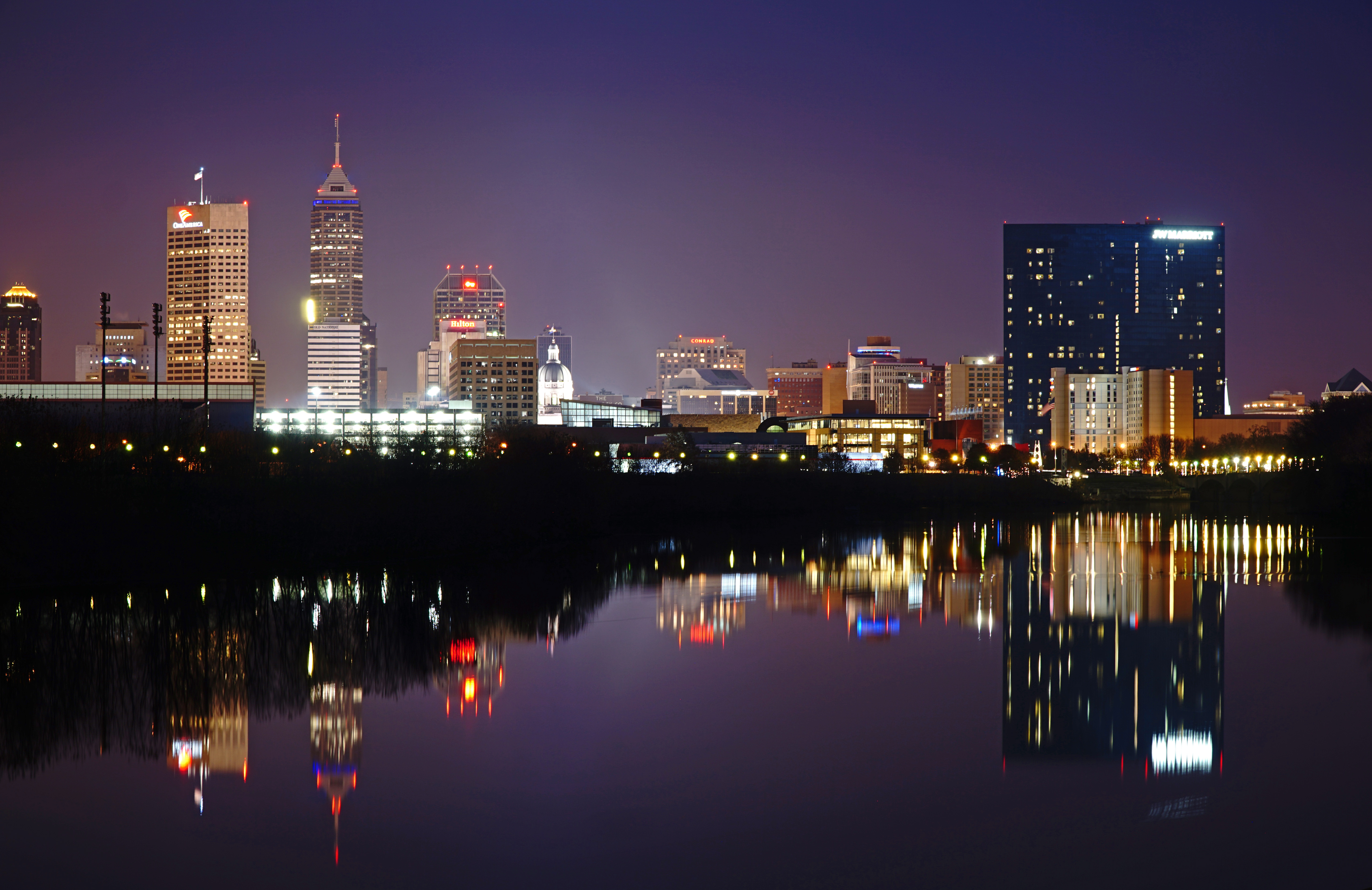
1. Indianapolis, capital

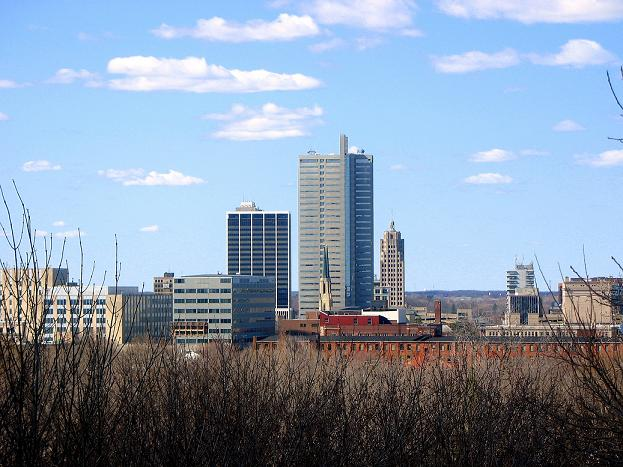
2. Fort Wayne

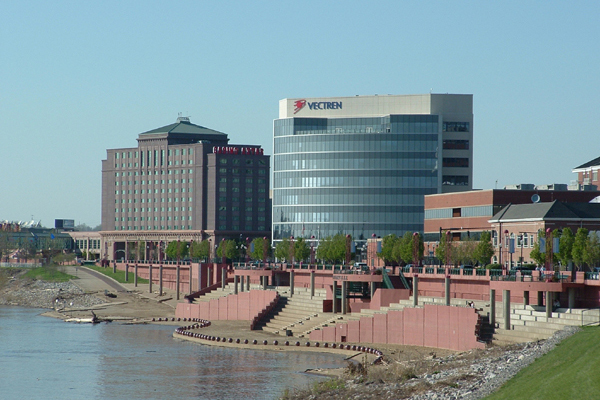
3. Evansville

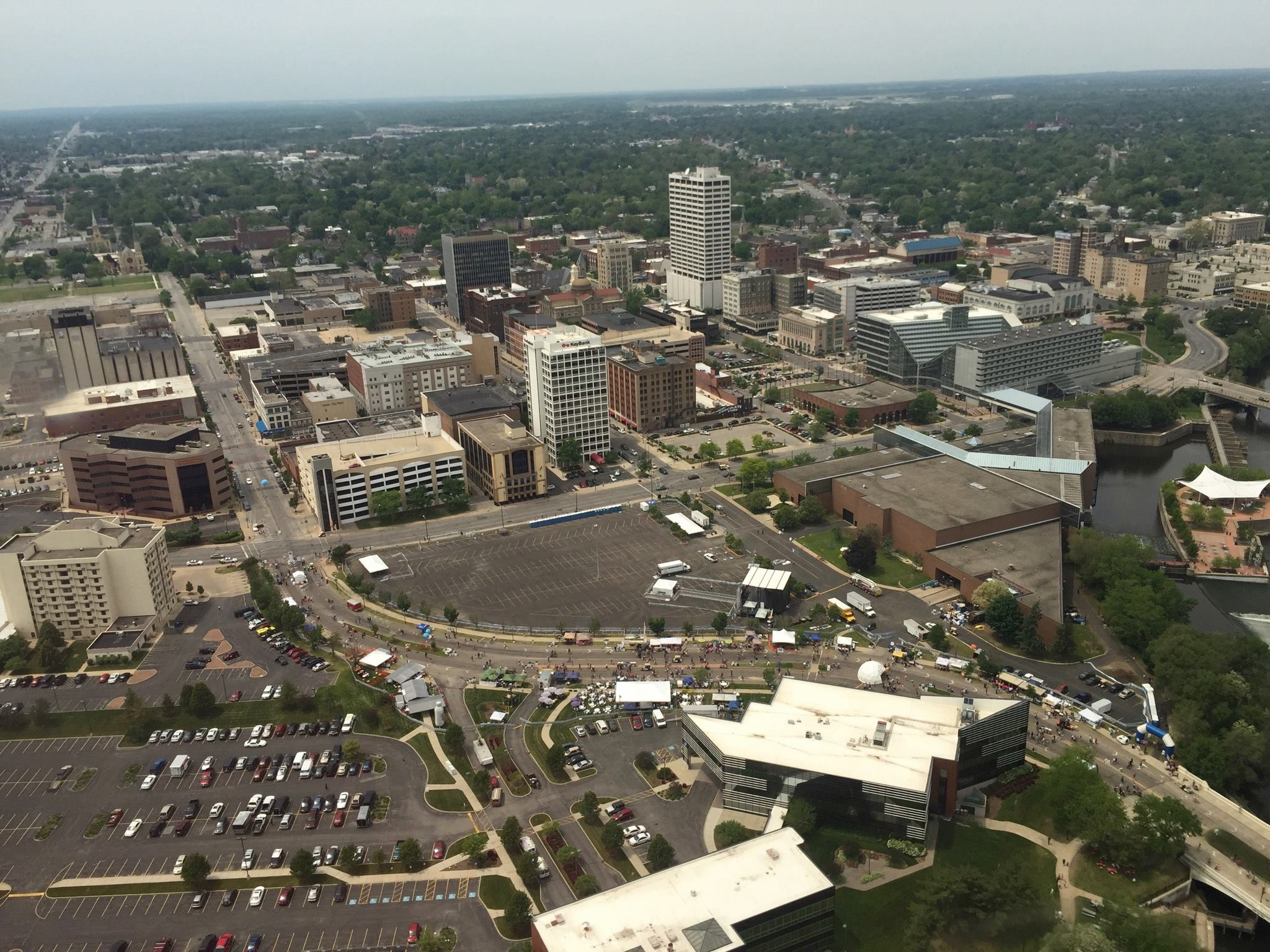
4. South Bend

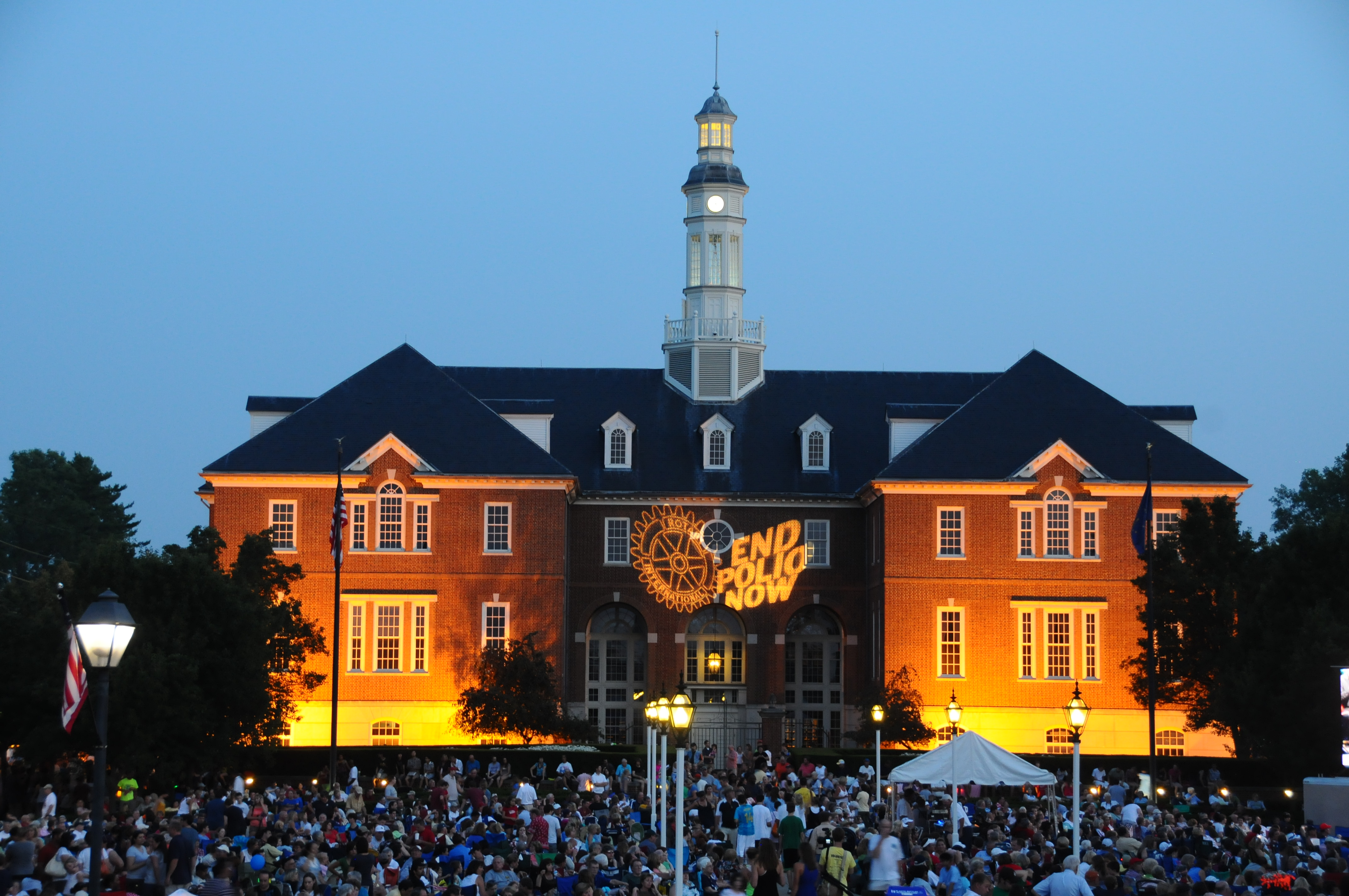
5. Carmel

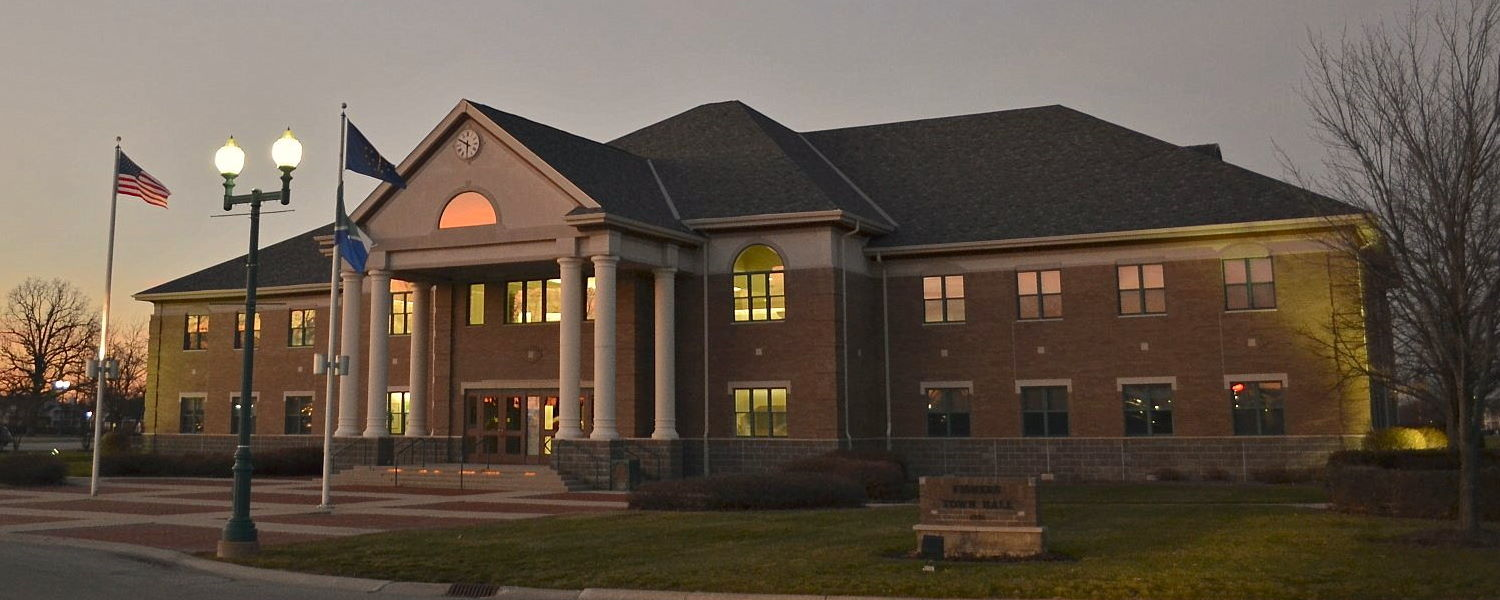
6. Fishers

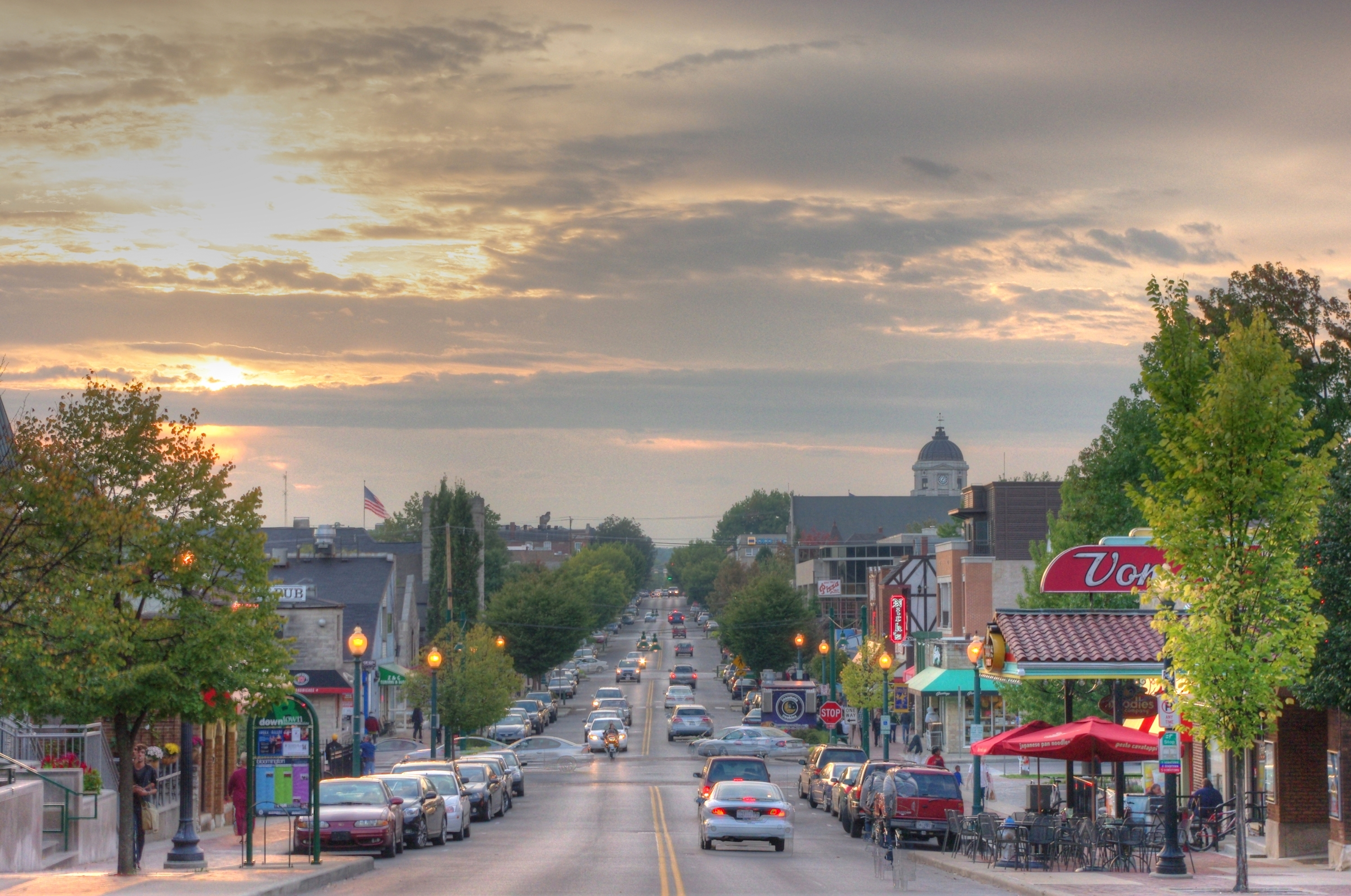
7. Bloomington

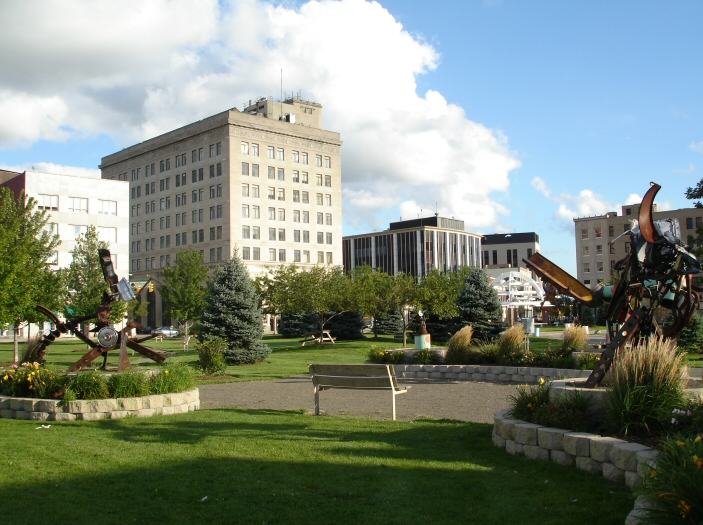
8. Hammond

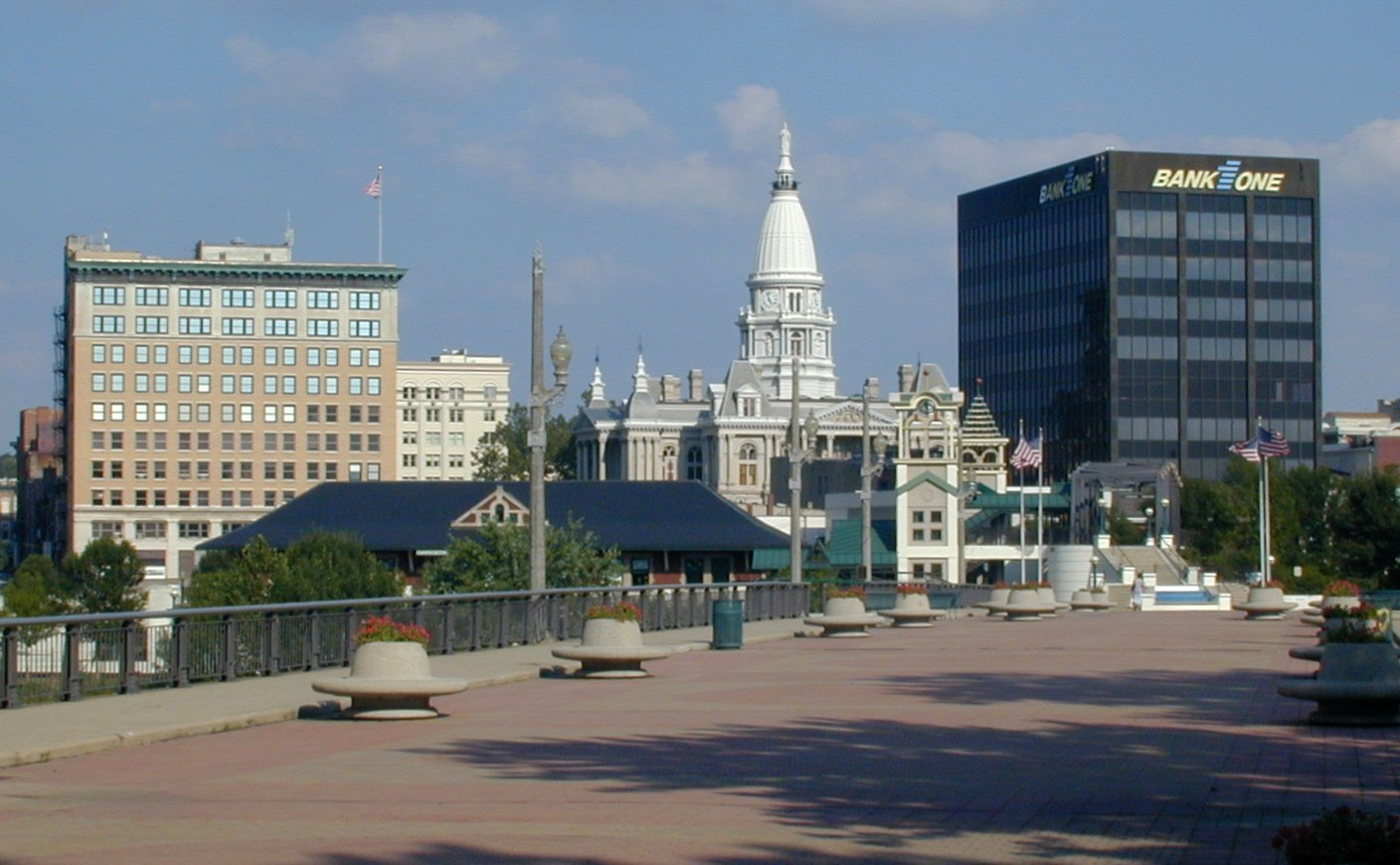
9. Lafayette

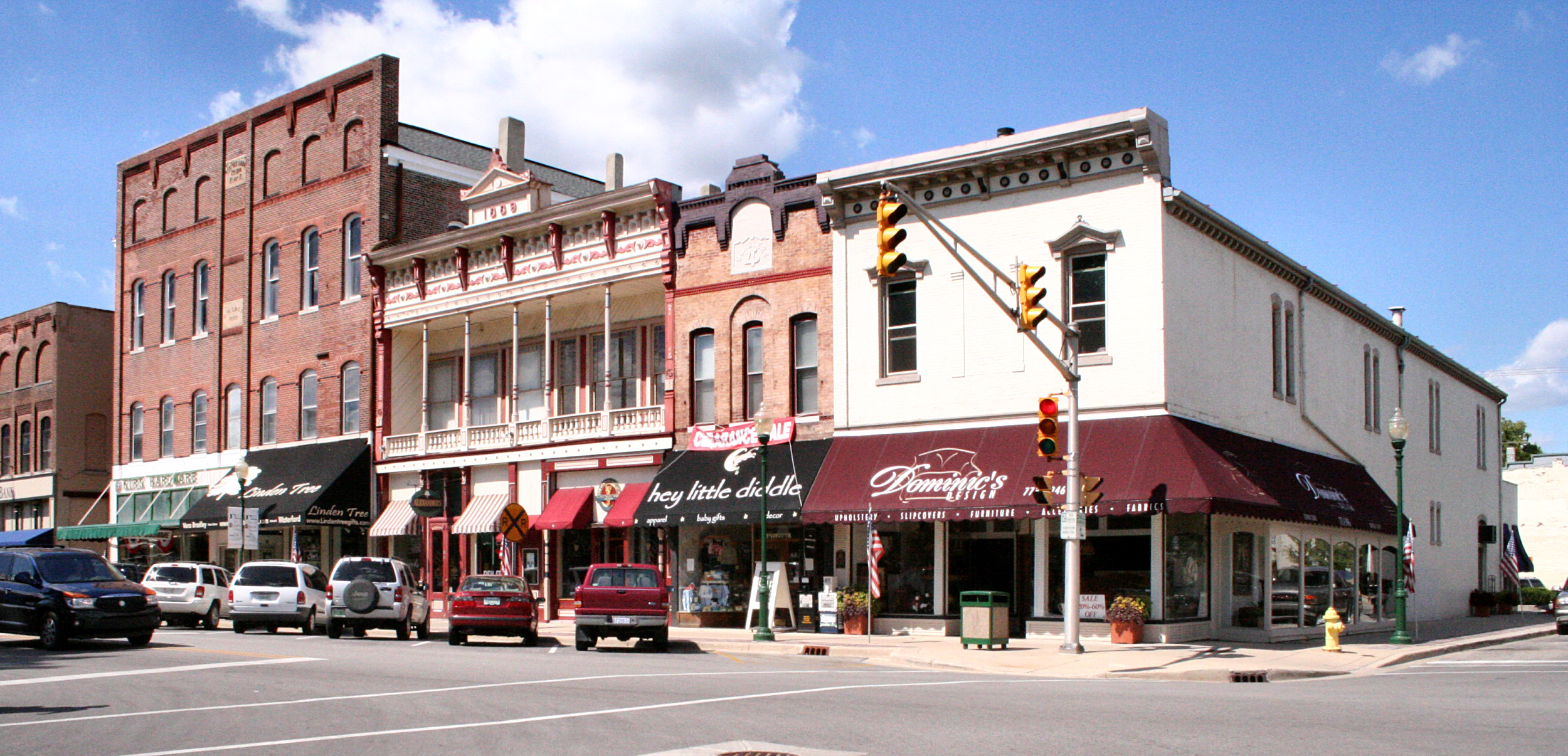
10. Noblesville

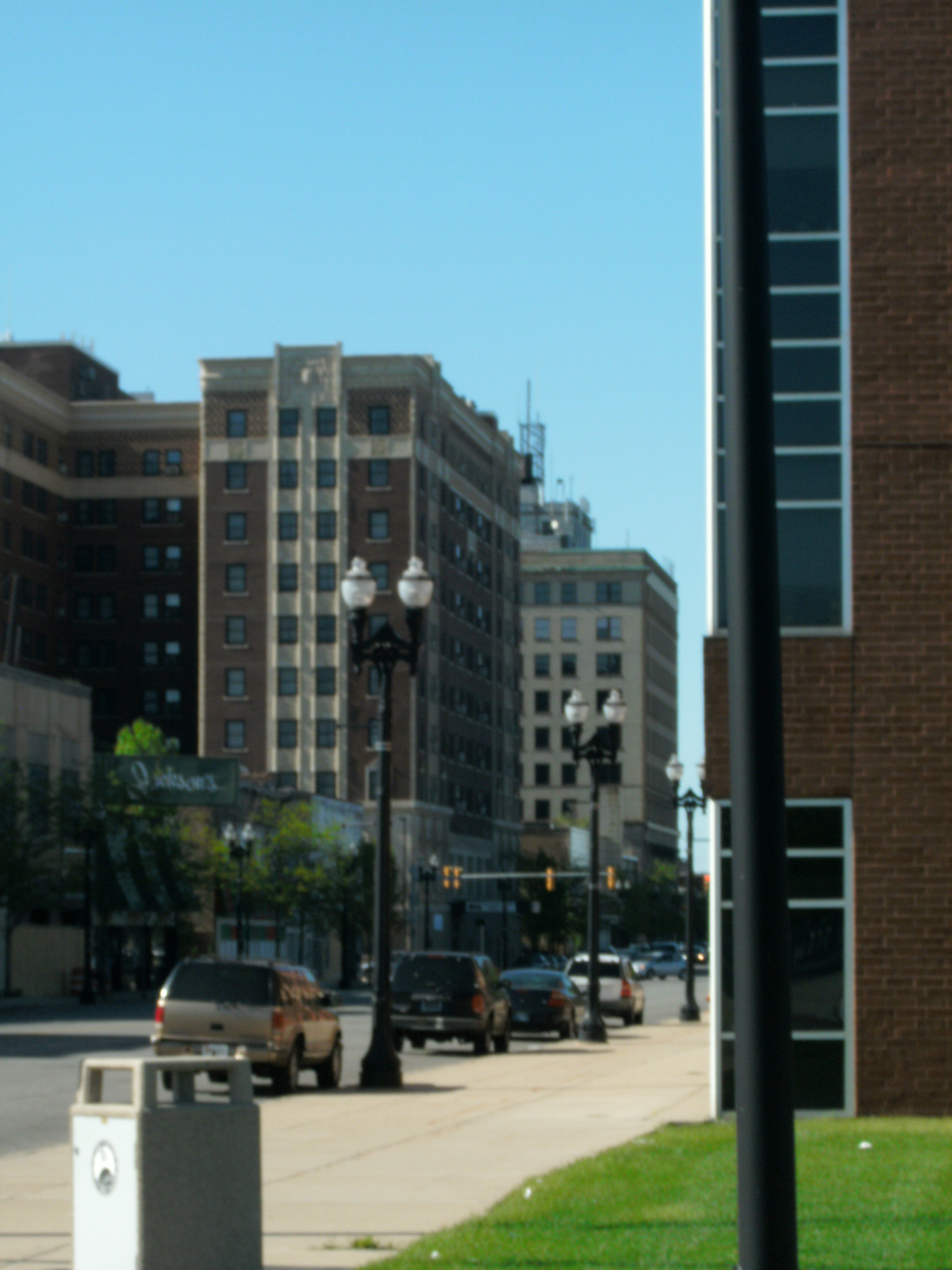
11. Gary

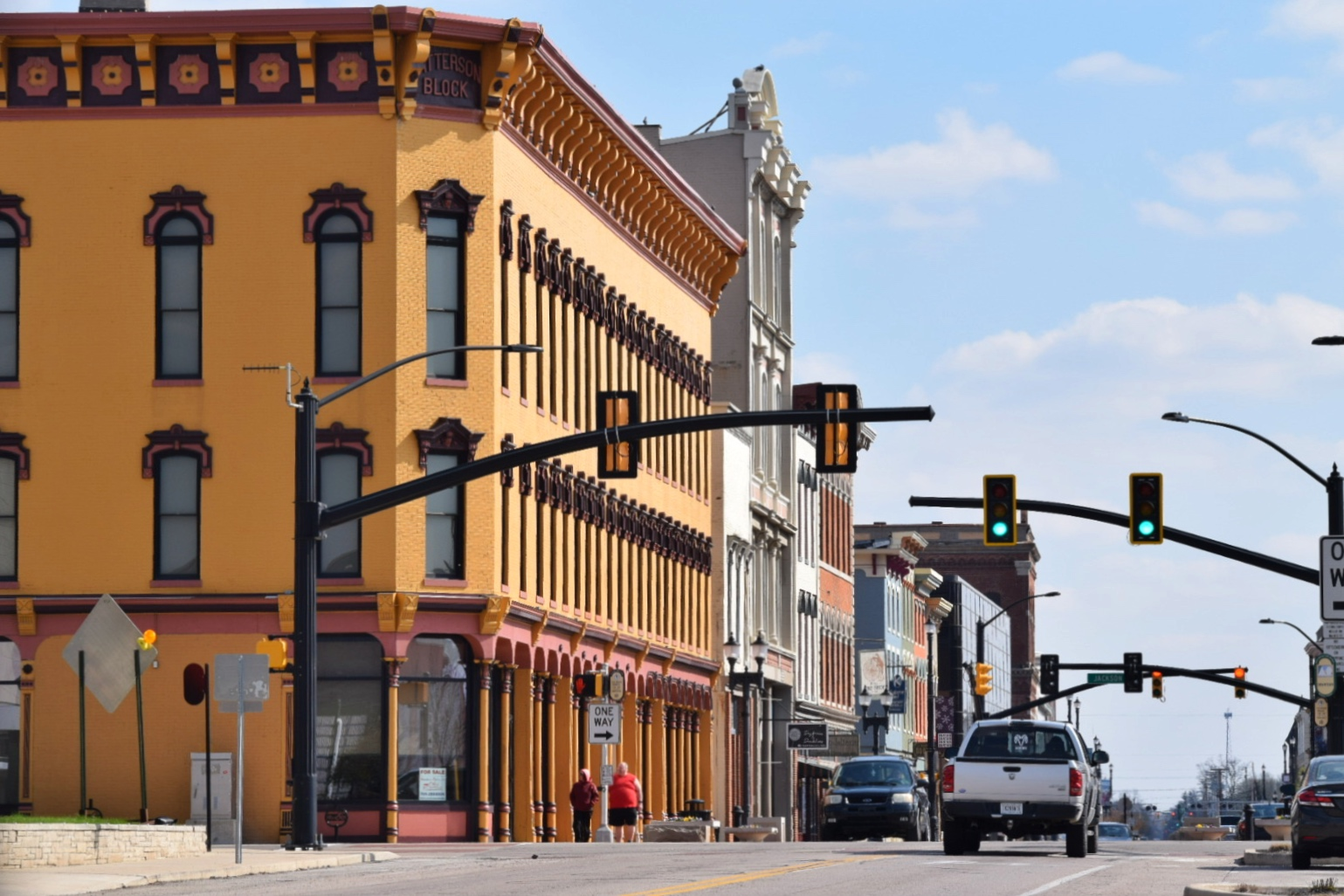
12. Muncie

== Municipalities ==
County seat †

State capital and county seat ‡

Name	Type	2020 Census	2010 Census	Change	County	Land area	Density
Advance	Town	503	477	+5.45%	Boone	0.59 sq mi (1.53 km^{2})	853.99/sq mi (326.66/km^{2})
Akron	Town	1,125	1,167	−3.60%	Fulton	0.46 sq mi (1.19 km^{2})	2,450.98/sq mi (946.69/km^{2})
Alamo	Town	66	66	0.00%	Montgomery	0.06 sq mi (0.16 km^{2})	1,064.52/sq mi (409.27/km^{2})
Albany	Town	2,295	2,165	+6.00%	Delaware, Randolph	1.99 sq mi (5.15 km^{2})	1,158.51/sq mi (447.29/km^{2})
Albion †	Town	2,222	2,349	−5.41%	Noble	1.91 sq mi (4.94 km^{2})	1,164.57/sq mi (449.63/km^{2})
Alexandria	City	5,149	5,145	+0.08%	Madison	3.02 sq mi (7.83 km^{2})	1,702.15/sq mi (657.25/km^{2})
Alfordsville	Town	65	101	−35.64%	Daviess	0.07 sq mi (0.17 km^{2})	984.85/sq mi (382.29/km^{2})
Alton	Town	29	55	−47.27%	Crawford	0.20 sq mi (0.51 km^{2})	168.60/sq mi (65.11/km^{2})
Altona	Town	213	197	+8.12%	DeKalb	0.20 sq mi (0.53 km^{2})	1,049.26/sq mi (405.67/km^{2})
Ambia	Town	227	239	−5.02%	Benton	0.15 sq mi (0.39 km^{2})	1,503.31/sq mi (580.60/km^{2})
Amboy	Town	317	384	−17.45%	Miami	0.34 sq mi (0.87 km^{2})	943.45/sq mi (364.23/km^{2})
Amo	Town	408	401	+1.75%	Hendricks	0.61 sq mi (1.58 km^{2})	666.67/sq mi (257.45/km^{2})
Anderson †	City	54,788	56,129	−2.39%	Madison	42.77 sq mi (110.77 km^{2})	1,292.28/sq mi (498.96/km^{2})
Andrews	Town	1,048	1,149	−8.79%	Huntington	0.64 sq mi (1.66 km^{2})	1,653.00/sq mi (637.86/km^{2})
Angola †	City	9,340	8,612	+8.45%	Steuben	6.54 sq mi (16.94 km^{2})	1,428.69/sq mi (555.45/km^{2})
Arcadia	Town	1,515	1,666	−9.06%	Hamilton	0.55 sq mi (1.43 km^{2})	2,749.55/sq mi (1,061.70/km^{2})
Argos	Town	1,777	1,691	+5.09%	Marshall	1.30 sq mi (3.36 km^{2})	1,381.80/sq mi (533.68/km^{2})
Ashley	Town	1,026	983	+4.37%	DeKalb, Steuben	1.90 sq mi (4.93 km^{2})	538.87/sq mi (208.05/km^{2})
Atlanta	Town	712	725	−1.79%	Hamilton		
Attica	City	3,324	3,245	+2.43%	Fountain	1.80 sq mi (4.67 km^{2})	1,682.93/sq mi (649.85/km^{2})
Auburn †	City	13,412	12,731	+5.35%	DeKalb	8.08 sq mi (20.94 km^{2})	1,659.08/sq mi (640.54/km^{2})
Aurora	City	3,698	3,750	−1.39%	Dearborn	3.54 sq mi (9.16 km^{2})	1,056.80/sq mi (408.05/km^{2})
Austin	City	4,094	4,295	−4.68%	Scott	2.66 sq mi (6.90 km^{2})	1,525.53/sq mi (589.09/km^{2})
Avilla	Town	2,438	2,401	+1.54%	Noble	1.71 sq mi (4.42 km^{2})	1,427.40/sq mi (551.00/km^{2})
Avon	Town	21,474	12,446	+72.54%	Hendricks	19.41 sq mi (50.26 km^{2})	1,115.24/sq mi (430.59/km^{2})
Bainbridge	Town	684	746	−8.31%	Putnam	0.40 sq mi (1.04 km^{2})	1,705.74/sq mi (659.31/km^{2})
Bargersville	Town	9,560	4,013	+138.23%	Johnson	18.73 sq mi (48.50 km^{2})	510.98/sq mi (197.29/km^{2})
Batesville	City	7,202	6,520	+10.46%	Ripley, Franklin	6.17 sq mi (15.98 km^{2})	1,178.88/sq mi (455.52/km^{2})
Battle Ground	Town	1,838	1,334	+37.78%	Tippecanoe	1.02 sq mi (2.64 km^{2})	1,801.96/sq mi (695.82/km^{2})
Bedford †	City	13,792	13,413	+2.83%	Lawrence	12.21 sq mi (31.62 km^{2})	1,129.57/sq mi (436.13/km^{2})
Beech Grove	City	14,717	14,192	+3.70%	Marion	4.47 sq mi (11.57 km^{2})	3,293.13/sq mi (1,271.46/km^{2})
Berne	City	4,262	3,999	+6.58%	Adams	2.33 sq mi (6.03 km^{2})	1,804.15/sq mi (696.69/km^{2})
Bethany	Town	95	81	+17.28%	Morgan	0.10 sq mi (0.25 km^{2})	1,000.00/sq mi (387.69/km^{2})
Beverly Shores	Town	599	613	−2.28%	Porter	5.83 sq mi (15.09 km^{2})	167.18/sq mi (64.54/km^{2})
Bicknell	City	2,832	2,915	−2.85%	Knox	1.35 sq mi (3.50 km^{2})	2,238.73/sq mi (864.38/km^{2})
Birdseye	Town	417	416	+0.24%	Dubois	0.64 sq mi (1.65 km^{2})	655.66/sq mi (253.14/km^{2})
Bloomfield †	Town	2,289	2,405	−4.82%	Greene	1.41 sq mi (3.65 km^{2})	1,625.71/sq mi (627.68/km^{2})
Bloomingdale	Town	269	335	−19.70%	Parke	0.58 sq mi (1.51 km^{2})	462.20/sq mi (178.59/km^{2})
Bloomington †	City	79,168	80,405	−1.54%	Monroe	23.16 sq mi (60.0 km^{2})	3,418/sq mi (1,320/km^{2})
Blountsville	Town	98	134	−26.87%	Henry	0.11 sq mi (0.30 km^{2})	890.91/sq mi (344.00/km^{2})
Bluffton †	City	10,308	9,897	+4.15%	Wells	8.52 sq mi (22.06 km^{2})	1,229.19/sq mi (474.57/km^{2})
Boonville †	City	6,712	6,246	+7.46%	Warrick	5.77 sq mi (14.94 km^{2})	1,171.17/sq mi (452.22/km^{2})
Borden	Town	786	808	−2.72%	Clark	1.39 sq mi (3.61 km^{2})	564.66/sq mi (218.06/km^{2})
Boston	Town	150	138	+8.70%	Wayne	0.22 sq mi (0.58 km^{2})	672.65/sq mi (259.65/km^{2})
Boswell	Town	800	778	+2.83%	Benton	0.88 sq mi (2.29 km^{2})	904.98/sq mi (349.41/km^{2})
Bourbon	Town	1,698	1,810	−6.19%	Marshall	1.16 sq mi (2.99 km^{2})	1,475.24/sq mi (569.51/km^{2})
Brazil †	City	8,181	7,912	+3.40%	Clay	3.72 sq mi (9.63 km^{2})	2,218.88/sq mi (856.72/km^{2})
Bremen	Town	4,696	4,588	+2.35%	Marshall	2.84 sq mi (7.35 km^{2})	1,657.02/sq mi (639.83/km^{2})
Bristol	Town	1,789	1,602	+11.67%	Elkhart	4.16 sq mi (10.78 km^{2})	445.14/sq mi (171.85/km^{2})
Brook	Town	939	997	−5.82%	Newton	0.69 sq mi (1.78 km^{2})	1,387.00/sq mi (535.24/km^{2})
Brooklyn	Town	2,511	1,598	+57.13%	Morgan	1.00 sq mi (2.60 km^{2})	2,536.36/sq mi (979.67/km^{2})
Brooksburg	Town	72	81	−11.11%	Jefferson	0.11 sq mi (0.29 km^{2})	705.88/sq mi (273.59/km^{2})
Brookston	Town	1,631	1,554	+4.95%	White	0.66 sq mi (1.71 km^{2})	2,471.21/sq mi (953.87/km^{2})
Brookville †	Town	2,622	2,596	+1.00%	Franklin	1.45 sq mi (3.75 km^{2})	1,876.88/sq mi (724.62/km^{2})
Brownsburg	Town	28,973	21,285	+36.12%	Hendricks	16.35 sq mi (42.36 km^{2})	1,780.98/sq mi (687.63/km^{2})
Brownstown †	Town	3,025	2,947	+2.65%	Jackson	1.62 sq mi (4.21 km^{2})	1,868.44/sq mi (721.59/km^{2})
Bruceville	Town	450	478	−5.86%	Knox	0.34 sq mi (0.89 km^{2})	1,311.95/sq mi (506.74/km^{2})
Bryant	Town	239	252	−5.16%	Jay	0.32 sq mi (0.83 km^{2})	749.22/sq mi (289.60/km^{2})
Bunker Hill	Town	814	888	−8.33%	Miami	0.39 sq mi (1.01 km^{2})	2,092.54/sq mi (808.46/km^{2})
Burket	Town	123	195	−36.92%	Kosciusko	0.07 sq mi (0.18 km^{2})	1,732.39/sq mi (665.82/km^{2})
Burlington	Town	517	603	−14.26%	Carroll	0.61 sq mi (1.58 km^{2})	844.77/sq mi (326.26/km^{2})
Burnettsville	Town	390	346	+12.72%	White	0.75 sq mi (1.93 km^{2})	522.79/sq mi (201.96/km^{2})
Burns Harbor	Town	2,055	1,156	+77.77%	Porter	6.44 sq mi (16.67 km^{2})	319.25/sq mi (123.27/km^{2})
Butler	City	2,719	2,684	+1.30%	DeKalb	1.97 sq mi (5.11 km^{2})	1,334.85/sq mi (515.28/km^{2})
Cadiz	Town	163	150	+8.67%	Henry	0.14 sq mi (0.37 km^{2})	1,131.94/sq mi (435.88/km^{2})
Cambridge City	Town	1,751	1,870	−6.36%	Wayne	1.02 sq mi (2.63 km^{2})	1,735.38/sq mi (669.92/km^{2})
Camden	Town	593	611	−2.95%	Carroll	0.26 sq mi (0.67 km^{2})	2,289.58/sq mi (884.65/km^{2})
Campbellsburg	Town	529	585	−9.57%	Washington	0.99 sq mi (2.57 km^{2})	533.27/sq mi (205.92/km^{2})
Cannelburg	Town	176	135	+30.37%	Daviess	0.21 sq mi (0.54 km^{2})	850.24/sq mi (328.19/km^{2})
Cannelton	City	1,473	1,563	−5.76%	Perry	1.57 sq mi (4.07 km^{2})	1,028.34/sq mi (397.11/km^{2})
Carbon	Town	263	397	−33.75%	Clay	0.15 sq mi (0.39 km^{2})	1,765.10/sq mi (682.31/km^{2})
Carlisle	Town	625	692	−9.68%	Sullivan	0.52 sq mi (1.34 km^{2})	1,206.56/sq mi (465.62/km^{2})
Carmel	City	99,757	79,191	+25.97%	Hamilton	47.46 sq mi (122.9 km^{2})	2,102/sq mi (812/km^{2})
Carthage	Town	918	927	−0.97%	Rush	0.56 sq mi (1.46 km^{2})	1,624.78/sq mi (627.10/km^{2})
Cayuga	Town	952	1,162	−18.07%	Vermillion	1.01 sq mi (2.62 km^{2})	939.78/sq mi (362.69/km^{2})
Cedar Grove	Town	150	156	−3.85%	Franklin	0.16 sq mi (0.41 km^{2})	993.38/sq mi (383.83/km^{2})
Cedar Lake	Town	14,106	11,560	+22.02%	Lake	10.17 sq mi (26.34 km^{2})	1,612.48/sq mi (622.56/km^{2})
Center Point	Town	213	242	−11.98%	Clay	0.76 sq mi (1.97 km^{2})	287.84/sq mi (111.10/km^{2})
Centerville	Town	2,748	2,552	+7.68%	Wayne	3.52 sq mi (9.11 km^{2})	781.13/sq mi (301.60/km^{2})
Chalmers	Town	523	508	+2.95%	White	0.30 sq mi (0.78 km^{2})	1,731.79/sq mi (668.77/km^{2})
Chandler	Town	3,693	2,887	+27.92%	Warrick	2.91 sq mi (7.55 km^{2})	1,267.33/sq mi (489.29/km^{2})
Charlestown	City	7,775	7,585	+2.50%	Clark	11.49 sq mi (29.75 km^{2})	679.16/sq mi (262.24/km^{2})
Chesterfield	Town	2,490	2,547	−2.24%	Madison, Delaware	1.37 sq mi (3.54 km^{2})	1,818.85/sq mi (702.51/km^{2})
Chesterton	Town	14,241	13,068	+8.98%	Porter	9.49 sq mi (24.59 km^{2})	1,517.91/sq mi (586.09/km^{2})
Chrisney	Town	465	481	−3.33%	Spencer	0.73 sq mi (1.90 km^{2})	658.64/sq mi (254.33/km^{2})
Churubusco	Town	1,870	1,796	+4.12%	Whitley	1.05 sq mi (2.71 km^{2})	1,784.35/sq mi (689.18/km^{2})
Cicero	Town	5,301	4,812	+10.16%	Hamilton	2.04 sq mi (5.29 km^{2})	3,254.14/sq mi (1256.60/km^{2})
Clarks Hill	Town	600	611	−1.80%	Tippecanoe	0.27 sq mi (0.71 km^{2})	2,205.88/sq mi (850.28/km^{2})
Clarksville	Town	22,333	21,724	+2.80%	Clark	10.23 sq mi (26.51 km^{2})	2,224.62/sq mi (858.90/km^{2})
Clay City	Town	878	861	+1.97%	Clay	0.54 sq mi (1.40 km^{2})	1,628.94/sq mi (629.03/km^{2})
Claypool	Town	396	431	−8.12%	Kosciusko	0.25 sq mi (0.65 km^{2})	1,622.95/sq mi (626.32/km^{2})
Clayton	Town	908	972	−6.58%	Hendricks		
Clear Lake	Town	354	339	+4.42%	Steuben	2.46 sq mi (6.38 km^{2})	318.06/sq mi (122.84/km^{2})
Clermont	Town	1,384	1,356	+2.06%	Marion	0.67 sq mi (1.73 km^{2})	2,071.86/sq mi (800.30/km^{2})
Clifford	Town	205	233	−12.02%	Bartholomew	0.09 sq mi (0.23 km^{2})	2,329.55/sq mi (895.29/km^{2})
Clinton	City	4,618	4,893	−5.62%	Vermillion	2.28 sq mi (5.90 km^{2})	2,145.20/sq mi (828.41/km^{2})
Cloverdale	Town	2,060	2,172	−5.16%	Putnam	3.49 sq mi (9.03 km^{2})	590.60/sq mi (228.03/km^{2})
Coatesville	Town	555	523	+6.12%	Hendricks	0.67 sq mi (1.72 km^{2})	849.92/sq mi (327.96/km^{2})
Colfax	Town	702	691	+1.59%	Clinton	0.37 sq mi (0.96 km^{2})	1,897.30/sq mi (733.11/km^{2})
Columbia City †	City	9,892	8,750	+13.05%	Whitley	5.47 sq mi (14.17 km^{2})	1,813.71/sq mi (700.34/km^{2})
Columbus †	City	50,474	44,061	+14.55%	Bartholomew	28.41 sq mi (73.58 km^{2})	1,682.06/sq mi (649.44/km^{2})
Connersville †	City	13,324	13,481	−1.16%	Fayette	7.70 sq mi (19.94 km^{2})	1,734.44/sq mi (669.67/km^{2})
Converse	Town	1,161	1,265	−8.22%	Miami, Grant	0.99 sq mi (2.57 km^{2})	1,173.91/sq mi (453.30/km^{2})
Corunna	Town	236	254	−7.09%	DeKalb	0.18 sq mi (0.46 km^{2})	1,318.44/sq mi (509.97/km^{2})
Corydon †	Town	3,153	3,122	+0.99%	Harrison	1.64 sq mi (4.24 km^{2})	1,927.26/sq mi (743.92/km^{2})
Country Club Heights	Town	98	79	+24.05%	Madison	0.29 sq mi (0.76 km^{2})	334.47/sq mi (128.98/km^{2})
Covington †	City	2,540	2,645	−3.97%	Fountain	1.29 sq mi (3.34 km^{2})	2,068.22/sq mi (789.26/km^{2})
Crandall	Town	134	152	−11.84%	Harrison	0.10 sq mi (0.27 km^{2})	1,288.46/sq mi (497.33/km^{2})
Crane	Town	166	184	−9.78%	Martin	0.12 sq mi (0.31 km^{2})	1,383.33/sq mi (532.46/km^{2})
Crawfordsville †	City	16,306	15,915	+2.46%	Montgomery	9.70 sq mi (25.11 km^{2})	1,681.72/sq mi (649.30/km^{2})
Cromwell	Town	487	512	−4.88%	Noble	0.29 sq mi (0.74 km^{2})	1,696.86/sq mi (655.55/km^{2})
Crothersville	Town	1,509	1,591	−5.15%	Jackson	1.16 sq mi (3.00 km^{2})	1,300.86/sq mi (502.40/km^{2})
Crown Point †	City	33,899	27,317	+24.09%	Lake	17.84 sq mi (46.20 km^{2})	1,660.59/sq mi (641.17/km^{2})
Crows Nest	Town	67	73	−8.22%	Marion	0.43 sq mi (1.11 km^{2})	156.18/sq mi (60.26/km^{2})
Culver	Town	1,129	1,353	−16.56%	Marshall	1.16 sq mi (3.00 km^{2})	974.96/sq mi (376.44/km^{2})
Cumberland	Town	5,954	5,169	+15.19%	Hancock, Marion	2.82 sq mi (7.30 km^{2})	2,118.11/sq mi (817.93/km^{2})
Cynthiana	Town	552	545	+1.28%	Posey	0.40 sq mi (1.03 km^{2})	1,383.46/sq mi (534.42/km^{2})
Dale	Town	1,544	1,593	−3.08%	Spencer	2.43 sq mi (6.29 km^{2})	638.81/sq mi (246.67/km^{2})
Daleville	Town	1,651	1,647	+0.24%	Delaware	2.15 sq mi (5.57 km^{2})	775.85/sq mi (299.51/km^{2})
Dana	Town	555	608	−8.72%	Vermillion	0.29 sq mi (0.76 km^{2})	1,900.68/sq mi (733.89/km^{2})
Danville †	Town	10,559	9,001	+17.31%	Hendricks	8.80 sq mi (22.80 km^{2})	1,206.47/sq mi (463.83/km^{2})
Darlington	Town	711	843	−15.66%	Montgomery	0.34 sq mi (0.87 km^{2})	2,122.39/sq mi (820.09/km^{2})
Darmstadt	Town	1,373	1,407	−2.42%	Vanderburgh		
Dayton	Town	1,330	1,420	−6.34%	Tippecanoe		
Decatur †	City	9,913	9,405	+5.40%	Adams	6.11 sq mi (15.81 km^{2})	1,625.08/sq mi (627.50/km^{2})
Decker	Town	199	249	−20.08%	Knox		
Delphi †	City	2,909	2,893	+0.55%	Carroll	2.71 sq mi (7.03 km^{2})	1,090.61/sq mi (421.10/km^{2})
DeMotte	Town	4,168	3,814	+9.28%	Jasper	3.59 sq mi (9.29 km^{2})	1,162.30/sq mi (448.78/km^{2})
Denver	Town	478	482	−0.83%	Miami		
Dillsboro	Town	1,360	1,327	+2.49%	Dearborn		
Dublin	Town	679	790	−14.05%	Wayne		
Dugger	Town	797	920	−13.37%	Sullivan		
Dune Acres	Town	234	182	+28.57%	Porter		
Dunkirk	City	2,249	2,362	−4.78%	Blackford, Jay	1.19 sq mi (3.07 km^{2})	1,841.70/sq mi (711.12/km^{2})
Dunreith	Town	171	177	−3.39%	Henry		
Dupont	Town	343	339	+1.18%	Jefferson		
Dyer	Town	16,517	16,390	+0.77%	Lake	6.18 sq mi (16.00 km^{2})	2,673.09/sq mi (1,032.10/km^{2})
Earl Park	Town	370	348	+6.32%	Benton		
East Chicago	City	26,370	29,698	−11.21%	Lake	14.09 sq mi (36.49 km^{2})	2,016.89/sq mi (778.75/km^{2})
East Germantown	Town	261	410	−36.34%	Wayne		
Eaton	Town	1,595	1,805	−11.63%	Delaware		
Economy	Town	145	187	−22.46%	Wayne		
Edgewood	Town	2,053	1,913	+7.32%	Madison		
Edinburgh	Town	4,435	4,480	−1.00%	Johnson, Bartholomew, Shelby	3.11 sq mi (8.04 km^{2})	1,427.88/sq mi (551.37/km^{2})
Edwardsport	Town	286	303	−5.61%	Knox		
Elberfeld	Town	644	625	+3.04%	Warrick		
Elizabeth	Town	199	162	+22.84%	Harrison		
Elizabethtown	Town	406	504	−19.44%	Bartholomew		
Elkhart	City	53,923	50,949	+5.84%	Elkhart	27.26 sq mi (70.61 km^{2})	1,986.34/sq mi (766.92/km^{2})
Ellettsville	Town	6,712	6,246	+7.46%	Monroe	5.17 sq mi (13.40 km^{2})	1,286.24/sq mi (496.61/km^{2})
Elnora	Town	631	640	−1.41%	Daviess		
Elwood	City	8,410	8,614	−2.37%	Madison, Tipton	3.97 sq mi (10.28 km^{2})	2,119.46/sq mi (818.35/km^{2})
English †	Town	685	645	+6.20%	Crawford		
Etna Green	Town	570	586	−2.73%	Kosciusko		
Evansville †	City	117,298	117,429	−0.11%	Vanderburgh	44.15 sq mi (114.3 km^{2})	2,657/sq mi (1,026/km^{2})
Fairland	Town	542	315	+72.06%	Shelby		
Fairmount	Town	2,682	2,954	−9.21%	Grant	1.59 sq mi (4.11 km^{2})	1,691.05/sq mi (652.80/km^{2})
Fairview Park	Town	1,409	1,386	+1.66%	Vermillion		
Farmersburg	Town	1,069	1,118	−4.38%	Sullivan		
Farmland	Town	1,270	1,333	−4.73%	Randolph		
Ferdinand	Town	2,157	2,157	0.00%	Dubois	2.30 sq mi (5.95 km^{2})	939.05/sq mi (362.64/km^{2})
Fillmore	Town	532	533	−0.19%	Putnam		
Fishers	City	98,977	76,794	+28.89%	Hamilton	33.59 sq mi (87.0 km^{2})	2,947/sq mi (1,138/km^{2})
Flora	Town	2,094	2,036	+2.85%	Carroll		
Fort Branch	Town	2,965	2,771	+7.00%	Gibson	1.09 sq mi (2.82 km^{2})	2,725.18/sq mi (1,052.14/km^{2})
Fort Wayne †	City	263,886	253,691	+4.02%	Allen	110.62 sq mi (286.5 km^{2})	2,386/sq mi (921/km^{2})
Fortville	Town	4,784	3,929	+21.76%	Hancock	3.45 sq mi (8.94 km^{2})	1,386.67/sq mi (535.39/km^{2})
Fountain City	Town	714	796	−10.30%	Wayne		
Fowler †	Town	2,337	2,317	+0.86%	Benton	1.41 sq mi (3.66 km^{2})	1,655/sq mi (638.92/km^{2})
Fowlerton	Town	268	261	+2.68%	Grant		
Francesville	Town	852	879	−3.07%	Pulaski		
Francisco	Town	545	469	+16.20%	Gibson		
Frankfort †	City	16,715	16,422	+1.78%	Clinton	8.05 sq mi (20.86 km^{2})	2,075.11/sq mi (801.21/km^{2})
Franklin †	City	25,313	23,712	+6.75%	Johnson	14.76 sq mi (40.35 km^{2})	1,714.62/sq mi (662.04/km^{2})
Frankton	Town	1,775	1,862	−4.67%	Madison		
Fremont	Town	2,034	2,138	−4.86%	Steuben	1.29 sq mi (3.35 km^{2})	1,831.53/sq mi (706.90/km^{2})
French Lick	Town	1,722	1,807	−4.70%	Orange		
Fulton	Town	303	333	−9.01%	Fulton		
Galveston	Town	1,288	1,311	−1.75%	Cass		
Garrett	City	6,542	6,286	+4.07%	DeKalb	4.17 sq mi (10.79 km^{2})	1,570.33/sq mi (606.37/km^{2})
Gary	City	69,093	80,294	−13.95%	Lake	49.87 sq mi (129.2 km^{2})	1,385/sq mi (535/km^{2})
Gas City	City	6,157	5,965	+3.22%	Grant	5.03 sq mi (13.02 km^{2})	1,224.79/sq mi (472.88/km^{2})
Gaston	Town	796	871	−8.61%	Delaware		
Geneva	Town	1,257	1,293	−2.78%	Adams		
Gentryville	Town	243	268	−9.33%	Spencer		
Georgetown	Town	3,805	2,876	+32.30%	Floyd	2.18 sq mi (5.64 km^{2})	1,748.62/sq mi (675.15/km^{2})
Glenwood	Town	245	250	−2.00%	Rush, Fayette		
Goodland	Town	980	1,043	−6.04%	Newton		
Goshen †	City	34,517	31,719	+8.82%	Elkhart	17.03 sq mi (44.10 km^{2})	1,983.31/sq mi (765.76/km^{2})
Gosport	Town	842	826	+1.94%	Owen		
Grabill	Town	1,112	1,053	+5.60%	Allen		
Grandview	Town	698	749	−6.81%	Spencer		
Greencastle †	City	9,820	10,326	−4.90%	Putnam	5.26 sq mi (13.63 km^{2})	1,884.11/sq mi (727.40/km^{2})
Greendale	City	4,339	4,520	−4.00%	Dearborn	5.73 sq mi (14.84 km^{2})	812.64/sq mi (313.78/km^{2})
Greenfield †	City	23,488	20,602	+14.01%	Hancock	13.71 sq mi (35.50 km^{2})	1,713.20/sq mi (661.47/km^{2})
Greens Fork	Town	335	423	−20.80%	Wayne		
Greensboro	Town	123	143	−13.99%	Henry		
Greensburg †	City	12,312	11,492	+7.14%	Decatur	9.41 sq mi (24.37 km^{2})	1,315.10/sq mi (507.76/km^{2})
Greentown	Town	2,370	2,415	−1.86%	Howard	1.29 sq mi (3.35 km^{2})	1,831.53/sq mi (706.90/km^{2})
Greenville	Town	1,365	595	+129.41%	Floyd		
Greenwood	City	63,830	49,791	+28.20%	Johnson	27.91 sq mi (72.28 km^{2})	2,026.27/sq mi (782.34/km^{2})
Griffin	Town	143	172	−16.86%	Posey		
Griffith	Town	16,528	16,893	−2.16%	Lake	7.77 sq mi (20.12 km^{2})	2,125.20/sq mi (5,504.24/km^{2})
Hagerstown	Town	1,681	1,787	−5.93%	Wayne		
Hamilton	Town	1,529	1,532	−0.20%	Steuben, DeKalb		
Hamlet	Town	773	800	−3.37%	Starke		
Hammond	City	77,879	80,830	−3.65%	Lake	22.78 sq mi (59.0 km^{2})	3,419/sq mi (1,320/km^{2})
Hanover	Town	3,743	3,546	+5.56%	Jefferson	2.22 sq mi (5.75 km^{2})	1,685.28/sq mi (650.55/km^{2})
Harmony	Town	677	656	+3.20%	Clay		
Hartford City †	City	6,086	6,220	−2.15%	Blackford	3.90 sq mi (10.10 km^{2})	1,567.75/sq mi (605.34/km^{2})
Hartsville	Town	317	362	−12.43%	Bartholomew		
Haubstadt	Town	1,638	1,577	+3.87%	Gibson		
Hazleton	Town	194	263	−26.24%	Gibson		
Hebron	Town	3,755	3,724	+0.83%	Porter	1.93 sq mi (4.98 km^{2})	1,950.65/sq mi (753.35/km^{2})
Highland	Town	23,984	23,727	+1.08%	Lake	6.97 sq mi (18.06 km^{2})	3,456.90/sq mi (1,334.78/km^{2})
Hillsboro	Town	508	538	−5.58%	Fountain		
Hobart	City	29,752	29,059	+2.38%	Lake	26.22 sq mi (67.92 km^{2})	1,077.22/sq mi (415.92/km^{2})
Holland	Town	619	626	−1.12%	Dubois		
Holton	Town	417	480	−13.12%	Ripley		
Homecroft	Town	752	722	+4.16%	Marion		
Hope	Town	2,099	2,102	−0.14%	Bartholomew		
Hudson	Town	585	518	+12.93%	Steuben		
Huntertown	Town	9,141	4,810	+90.04%	Allen	5.34 sq mi (13.83 km^{2})	1,723.09/sq mi (665.34/km^{2})
Huntingburg	City	6,362	6,057	+5.04%	Dubois	5.27 sq mi (13.64 km^{2})	1,258.80/sq mi (486.05/km^{2})
Huntington †	City	17,022	17,391	−2.12%	Huntington	9.45 sq mi (24.47 km^{2})	1,827/sq mi (705.81/km^{2})
Hymera	Town	653	801	−18.48%	Sullivan		
Indian Village	Town	118	133	−11.28%	St. Joseph		
Indianapolis ‡	City	887,642	820,445	+8.19%	Marion	361.51 sq mi (936.30 km^{2})	2,456/sq mi (948/km^{2})
Ingalls	Town	2,223	2,394	−7.14%	Madison	3.01 sq mi (7.79 km^{2})	739.52/sq mi (285.49/km^{2})
Jamestown	Town	942	958	−1.67%	Boone, Hendricks		
Jasonville	City	2,141	2,222	−3.65%	Greene	1.27 sq mi (3.30 km^{2})	1,563.88/sq mi (603.89/km^{2})
Jasper †	City	16,703	15,038	+11.07%	Dubois	13.34 sq mi (34.55 km^{2})	1,260.51/sq mi (486.68/km^{2})
Jeffersonville †	City	49,447	44,953	+10.00%	Clark	34.38 sq mi (89.06 km^{2})	1,381.98/sq mi (533.59/km^{2})
Jonesboro	City	1,629	1,756	−7.23%	Grant	0.89 sq mi (2.31 km^{2})	1,697.65/sq mi (655.57/km^{2})
Jonesville	Town	178	177	+0.56%	Bartholomew		
Kempton	Town	288	335	−14.03%	Tipton		
Kendallville	City	10,271	9,862	+4.15%	Noble	6.34 sq mi (16.42 km^{2})	1,689.64/sq mi (648.47/km^{2})
Kennard	Town	451	471	−4.25%	Henry		
Kentland †	Town	1,641	1,748	−6.12%	Newton		
Kewanna	Town	576	613	−6.04%	Fulton		
Kingman	Town	559	511	+9.39%	Fountain		
Kingsbury	Town	190	242	−21.49%	LaPorte		
Kingsford Heights	Town	1,335	1,435	−6.97%	LaPorte		
Kirklin	Town	710	788	−9.90%	Clinton		
Knightstown	Town	2,140	2,182	−1.92%	Henry	1.03 sq mi (2.67 km^{2})	2,077.67/sq mi (802.52/km^{2})
Knightsville	Town	702	872	−19.50%	Clay		
Knox †	City	3,552	3,704	−4.10%	Starke	3.96 sq mi (10.25 km^{2})	925.68/sq mi (357.38/km^{2})
Kokomo †	City	59,604	45,468	+31.09%	Howard	36.76 sq mi (95.20 km^{2})	1,580.33/sq mi (610.18/km^{2})
Kouts	Town	2,028	1,879	+7.93%	Porter		
La Crosse	Town	555	551	+0.73%	LaPorte		
La Fontaine	Town	798	875	−8.80%	Wabash		
La Paz	Town	475	561	−15.33%	Marshall		
La Porte †	City	22,471	22,053	+1.90%	LaPorte	12.68 sq mi (32.84 km^{2})	1,884.83/sq mi (727.77/km^{2})
Laconia	Town	73	50	+46.00%	Harrison		
Ladoga	Town	1,081	985	+9.75%	Montgomery		
Lafayette †	City	70,783	67,140	+5.43%	Tippecanoe	27.74 sq mi (71.8 km^{2})	2,552/sq mi (985/km^{2})
LaGrange †	Town	2,715	2,625	+3.43%	LaGrange	1.79 sq mi (4.62 km^{2})	1,520.16/sq mi (587.08/km^{2})
Lagro	Town	349	415	−15.90%	Wabash		
Lake Station	City	13,235	12,572	+5.27%	Lake	8.42 sq mi (21.82 km^{2})	1,596.50/sq mi (616.44/km^{2})
Lakeville	Town	879	786	+11.83%	St. Joseph		
Lanesville	Town	935	564	+65.78%	Harrison		
Lapel	Town	2,325	2,068	+12.43%	Madison		
Larwill	Town	273	283	−3.53%	Whitley		
Laurel	Town	406	512	−20.70%	Franklin		
Lawrence	City	49,370	46,001	+7.32%	Marion	20.25 sq mi (52.45 km^{2})	2,376.19/sq mi (917.47/km^{2})
Lawrenceburg †	City	5,129	5,042	+1.73%	Dearborn	5.55 sq mi (14.37 km^{2})	970.30/sq mi (374.67/km^{2})
Leavenworth	Town	289	238	+21.43%	Crawford		
Lebanon †	City	16,662	15,792	+5.51%	Boone	17.32 sq mi (44.87 km^{2})	962.73/sq mi (371.71/km^{2})
Leesburg	Town	555	555	0.00%	Kosciusko		
Leo-Cedarville	Town	3,624	3,603	+0.58%	Allen	3.72 sq mi (10.25 km^{2})	973.15/sq mi (375.70/km^{2})
Lewisville	Town	337	366	−7.92%	Henry		
Liberty †	Town	2,000	2,133	−6.24%	Union	0.86 sq mi (2.22 km^{2})	2,331.00/sq mi (900.34/km^{2})
Ligonier	City	4,411	4,405	+0.14%	Noble	2.80 sq mi (7.26 km^{2})	1,630.85/sq mi (629.65/km^{2})
Linden	Town	711	759	−6.32%	Montgomery		
Linton	City	5,133	5,413	−5.17%	Greene	3.20 sq mi (8.29 km^{2})	1,603.56/sq mi (619.17/km^{2})
Little York	Town	189	192	−1.56%	Washington		
Livonia	Town	99	128	−22.66%	Washington		
Lizton	Town	511	488	+4.71%	Hendricks		
Logansport †	City	18,366	18,396	−0.16%	Cass	10.72 sq mi (27.77 km^{2})	1,750.14/sq mi (675.73/km^{2})
Long Beach	Town	1,189	1,179	+0.85%	LaPorte		
Loogootee	City	2,661	2,751	−3.27%	Martin	1.57 sq mi (4.06 km^{2})	1,661.98/sq mi (641.74/km^{2})
Losantville	Town	221	237	−6.75%	Randolph		
Lowell	Town	10,680	9,276	+15.14%	Lake	6.58 sq mi (17.04 km^{2})	1,643.84/sq mi (634.65/km^{2})
Lynn	Town	954	1,097	−13.04%	Randolph		
Lynnville	Town	830	888	−6.53%	Warrick		
Lyons	Town	625	742	−15.77%	Greene		
Mackey	Town	131	106	+23.58%	Gibson		
Macy	Town	199	209	−4.78%	Miami		
Madison †	City	12,357	11,967	+3.26%	Jefferson	8.92 sq mi (23.09 km^{2})	1,430.21/sq mi (552.23/km^{2})
Marengo	Town	829	828	+0.12%	Crawford		
Marion †	City	28,310	29,948	−5.47%	Grant	15.58 sq mi (40.35 km^{2})	1,835.41/sq mi (708.67/km^{2})
Markle	Town	1,071	1,095	−2.19%	Huntington, Wells		
Markleville	Town	484	528	−8.33%	Madison		
Marshall	Town	274	324	−15.43%	Parke		
Martinsville †	City	11,932	11,828	+0.88%	Morgan	9.27 sq mi (24.00 km^{2})	1,303.05/sq mi (503.09/km^{2})
Matthews	Town	494	596	−17.11%	Grant		
Mauckport	Town	46	81	−43.21%	Harrison		
McCordsville	Town	8,503	4,797	+77.26%	Hancock	7.20 sq mi (18.65 km^{2})	1,190.40/sq mi (459.62/km^{2})
Mecca	Town	263	335	−21.49%	Parke		
Medaryville	Town	559	614	−8.96%	Pulaski		
Medora	Town	635	693	−8.37%	Jackson		
Mellott	Town	174	197	−11.68%	Fountain		
Mentone	Town	943	1,001	−5.79%	Kosciusko		
Meridian Hills	Town	1,774	1,616	+9.78%	Marion		
Merom	Town	208	228	−8.77%	Sullivan		
Merrillville	Town	36,444	35,246	+3.40%	Lake	33.29 sq mi (86.21 km^{2})	1,096.49/sq mi (423.36/km^{2})
Michiana Shores	Town	306	313	−2.24%	LaPorte		
Michigan City	City	32,075	31,479	+1.89%	LaPorte	22.93 sq mi (59.38 km^{2})	1,584.55/sq mi (611.81/km^{2})
Michigantown	Town	441	467	−5.57%	Clinton		
Middlebury	Town	3,466	3,420	+1.35%	Elkhart	4.33 sq mi (11.22 km^{2})	799.91/sq mi (308.87/km^{2})
Middletown	Town	2,253	2,322	−2.97%	Henry	1.16 sq mi (3.00 km^{2})	1,943.92/sq mi (750.86/km^{2})
Milan	Town	1,823	1,899	−4.00%	Ripley		
Milford	Town	1,614	1,562	+3.33%	Kosciusko		
Millersburg	Town	957	903	+5.98%	Elkhart		
Millhousen	Town	149	127	+17.32%	Decatur		
Milltown	Town	790	818	−3.42%	Crawford, Harrison		
Milton	Town	455	490	−7.14%	Wayne		
Mishawaka	City	51,063	48,252	+5.83%	St. Joseph	17.93 sq mi (46.44 km^{2})	2,765.22/sq mi (1,067.68/km^{2})
Mitchell	City	4,269	4,350	−1.86%	Lawrence	3.60 sq mi (9.32 km^{2})	1,094.32/sq mi (422.57/km^{2})
Modoc	Town	157	196	−19.90%	Randolph		
Monon	Town	1,919	1,777	+7.99%	White		
Monroe	Town	885	842	+5.11%	Adams		
Monroe City	Town	502	545	−7.89%	Knox		
Monroeville	Town	1,294	1,235	+4.78%	Allen		
Monrovia	Town	1,643	1,063	+54.56%	Morgan		
Monterey	Town	182	218	−16.51%	Pulaski		
Montezuma	Town	921	1,022	−9.88%	Parke		
Montgomery	Town	792	343	+130.90%	Daviess		
Monticello †	City	5,508	5,378	+2.42%	White	3.68 sq mi (9.53 km^{2})	1,589.15/sq mi (613.61/km^{2})
Montpelier	City	1,666	1,805	−7.70%	Blackford	1.50 sq mi (3.87 km^{2})	1,029.41/sq mi (397.57/km^{2})
Mooreland	Town	335	375	−10.67%	Henry		
Moores Hill	Town	675	597	+13.07%	Dearborn		
Mooresville	Town	9,411	9,326	+0.91%	Morgan	6.76 sq mi (17.52 km^{2})	1,403.37/sq mi (541.88/km^{2})
Morgantown	Town	1,014	986	+2.84%	Morgan		
Morocco	Town	1,081	1,129	−4.25%	Newton		
Morristown	Town	1,205	1,218	−1.07%	Shelby		
Mount Auburn	Town	129	117	+10.26%	Wayne		
Mount Ayr	Town	117	122	−4.10%	Newton		
Mount Carmel	Town	76	86	−11.63%	Franklin		
Mount Etna	Town	111	94	+18.09%	Huntington		
Mount Summit	Town	342	352	−2.84%	Henry		
Mount Vernon †	City	6,493	6,687	−2.90%	Posey	2.92 sq mi (7.56 km^{2})	2,256.08/sq mi (871.13/km^{2})
Mulberry	Town	1,231	1,254	−1.83%	Clinton		
Muncie †	City	65,194	70,085	−6.98%	Delaware	27.60 sq mi (71.49 km^{2})	2,518.06/sq mi (972.23/km^{2})
Munster	Town	23,894	23,603	+1.23%	Lake	7.63 sq mi (19.75 km^{2})	3,172.33/sq mi (1,224.83/km^{2})
Napoleon	Town	236	234	+0.85%	Ripley		
Nappanee	City	6,949	6,648	+4.53%	Elkhart, Kosciusko	4.78 sq mi (12.37 km^{2})	1,455.29/sq mi (561.91/km^{2})
Nashville †	Town	1,256	803	+56.41%	Brown		
New Albany †	City	37,841	36,372	+4.04%	Floyd	15.11 sq mi (39.13 km^{2})	2,454.81/sq mi (947.79/km^{2})
New Amsterdam	Town	12	27	−55.56%	Harrison		
New Carlisle	Town	1,891	1,861	+1.61%	St. Joseph		
New Castle †	City	17,396	18,114	−3.96%	Henry	7.34 sq mi (19.02 km^{2})	2,375/sq mi (917.03/km^{2})
New Chicago	Town	1,999	2,035	−1.77%	Lake		
New Harmony	Town	690	789	−12.55%	Posey		
New Haven	City	15,583	14,794	+5.33%	Allen	11.83 sq mi (30.64 km^{2})	1,317.69/sq mi (508.77/km^{2})
New Market	Town	559	636	−12.11%	Montgomery		
New Middletown	Town	90	93	−3.23%	Harrison		
New Palestine	Town	2,744	2,055	+33.53%	Hancock		
New Pekin	Town	1,323	1,401	−5.57%	Washington		
New Point	Town	319	331	−3.63%	Decatur		
New Richmond	Town	309	333	−7.21%	Montgomery		
New Ross	Town	309	347	−10.95%	Montgomery		
New Whiteland	Town	5,550	5,472	+1.43%	Johnson	1.45 sq mi (3.76 km^{2})	3,819.68/sq mi (1474.81/km^{2})
Newberry	Town	159	193	−17.62%	Greene		
Newburgh	Town	3,344	3,325	+0.57%	Warrick	1.49 sq mi (3.86 km^{2})	2,241.29/sq mi (865.31/km^{2})
Newport †	Town	416	515	−19.22%	Vermillion		
Newtown	Town	217	256	−15.23%	Fountain		
Noblesville †	City	69,604	51,969	+33.93%	Hamilton	33.56 sq mi (86.93 km^{2})	1,871.36/sq mi (722.53/km^{2})
North Crows Nest	Town	44	45	−2.22%	Marion		
North Judson	Town	1,857	1,772	+4.80%	Starke		
North Liberty	Town	1,623	1,896	−14.40%	St. Joseph		
North Manchester	Town	5,227	6,112	−14.48%	Wabash	3.63 sq mi (9.39 km^{2})	1,488.16/sq mi (574.63/km^{2})
North Salem	Town	464	518	−10.42%	Hendricks		
North Vernon	City	6,608	6,728	−1.78%	Jennings	7.68 sq mi (19.90 km^{2})	861.09/sq mi (332.46/km^{2})
North Webster	Town	998	1,146	−12.91%	Kosciusko		
Oakland City	City	2,407	2,429	−0.91%	Gibson	1.02 sq mi (2.64 km^{2})	2,232.13/sq mi (861.94/km^{2})
Oaktown	Town	581	608	−4.44%	Knox		
Odon	Town	1,397	1,354	+3.18%	Daviess		
Ogden Dunes	Town	1,168	1,110	+5.23%	Porter		
Oldenburg	Town	647	674	−4.01%	Franklin		
Onward	Town	76	100	−24.00%	Cass		
Oolitic	Town	1,137	1,184	−3.97%	Lawrence		
Orestes	Town	329	414	−20.53%	Madison		
Orland	Town	389	434	−10.37%	Steuben		
Orleans	Town	2,108	2,142	−1.59%	Orange	1.71 sq mi (4.43 km^{2})	1,233.47/sq mi (476.13/km^{2})
Osceola	Town	2,590	2,463	+5.16%	St. Joseph	1.36 sq mi (3.52 km^{2})	1,905.81/sq mi (735.87/km^{2})
Osgood	Town	1,587	1,624	−2.28%	Ripley		
Ossian	Town	3,266	3,289	−0.70%	Wells	1.67 sq mi (4.31 km^{2})	1,960.38/sq mi (757.05/km^{2})
Otterbein	Town	1,144	1,262	−9.35%	Tippecanoe, Benton		
Owensville	Town	1,338	1,284	+4.21%	Gibson		
Oxford	Town	1,165	1,162	+0.26%	Benton		
Palmyra	Town	898	930	−3.44%	Harrison		
Paoli †	Town	3,666	3,677	−0.30%	Orange	3.74 sq mi (9.68 km^{2})	980.48/sq mi (378.54/km^{2})
Paragon	Town	556	659	−15.63%	Morgan		
Parker City	Town	1,278	1,419	−9.94%	Randolph		
Patoka	Town	706	735	−3.95%	Gibson		
Patriot	Town	201	209	−3.83%	Switzerland		
Pendleton	Town	4,717	4,253	+10.91%	Madison	13.43 sq mi (34.79 km^{2})	352.99/sq mi (136.29/km^{2})
Pennville	Town	621	701	−11.41%	Jay		
Perrysville	Town	456	456	0.00%	Vermillion		
Peru †	City	11,073	11,417	−3.01%	Miami	5.65 sq mi (14.64 km^{2})	2,009.25/sq mi (775.83/km^{2})
Petersburg †	City	2,299	2,383	−3.52%	Pike	1.47 sq mi (3.81 km^{2})	1,569.48/sq mi (605.91/km^{2})
Pierceton	Town	928	1,015	−8.57%	Kosciusko		
Pine Village	Town	212	217	−2.30%	Warren		
Pittsboro	Town	3,682	2,928	+25.75%	Hendricks	3.78 sq mi (9.80 km^{2})	973.56/sq mi (375.88/km^{2})
Plainfield	Town	34,625	27,631	+25.31%	Hendricks	26.12 sq mi (67.66 km^{2})	1,331.99/sq mi (514.28/km^{2})
Plainville	Town	499	476	+4.83%	Daviess		
Plymouth †	City	10,214	10,033	+1.80%	Marshall	7.62 sq mi (19.74 km^{2})	1,349.10/sq mi (520.88/km^{2})
Poneto	Town	173	166	+4.22%	Wells		
Portage	City	37,926	36,828	+2.98%	Porter	27.61 sq mi (71.51 km^{2})	1,430.67/sq mi (552.39/km^{2})
Porter	Town	5,210	4,858	+7.25%	Porter	6.44 sq mi (16.69 km^{2})	845.64/sq mi (326.50/km^{2})
Portland †	City	6,320	6,223	+1.56%	Jay	4.88 sq mi (12.63 km^{2})	1,296.94/sq mi (500.79/km^{2})
Poseyville	Town	966	1,045	−7.56%	Posey		
Pottawattamie Park	Town	242	235	+2.98%	LaPorte		
Prince's Lakes	Town	1,372	1,312	+4.57%	Johnson		
Princeton †	City	8,301	8,644	−3.97%	Gibson	5.48 sq mi (14.19 km^{2})	1,516.16/sq mi (585.39/km^{2})
Redkey	Town	1,100	1,353	−18.70%	Jay		
Remington	Town	1,356	1,185	+14.43%	Jasper		
Rensselaer †	City	5,733	5,859	−2.15%	Jasper	6.73 sq mi (17.44 km^{2})	852.11/sq mi (328.99/km^{2})
Reynolds	Town	531	533	−0.38%	White		
Richland	Town	403	425	−5.18%	Spencer		
Richmond †	City	35,720	36,812	−2.97%	Wayne	24.16 sq mi (62.57 km^{2})	1,486.19/sq mi (573.82/km^{2})
Ridgeville	Town	688	803	−14.32%	Randolph		
Riley	Town	238	221	+7.69%	Vigo		
Rising Sun †	City	2,131	2,304	−7.51%	Ohio	1.63 sq mi (4.23 km^{2})	1,496.67/sq mi (577.81/km^{2})
River Forest	Town	26	22	+18.18%	Madison		
Roachdale	Town	840	926	−9.29%	Putnam		
Roann	Town	441	479	−7.93%	Wabash		
Roanoke	Town	1,762	1,722	+2.32%	Huntington		
Rochester †	City	6,270	6,218	+0.84%	Fulton	5.68 sq mi (14.71 km^{2})	1,311.02/sq mi (506.19/km^{2})
Rockport †	City	2,136	2,270	−5.90%	Spencer	1.69 sq mi (4.37 km^{2})	1,196.62/sq mi (462.07/km^{2})
Rockville †	Town	2,510	2,607	−3.72%	Parke	1.49 sq mi (3.87 km^{2})	1,682.31/sq mi (649.35/km^{2})
Rocky Ripple	Town	655	606	+8.09%	Marion		
Rome City	Town	1,322	1,361	−2.87%	Noble		
Rosedale	Town	636	725	−12.28%	Parke		
Roseland	Town	854	630	+35.56%	St. Joseph		
Rossville	Town	1,508	1,653	−8.77%	Clinton		
Royal Center	Town	802	861	−6.85%	Cass		
Rushville †	City	6,208	6,341	−2.10%	Rush	3.31 sq mi (8.56 km^{2})	1,877.80/sq mi (725.04/km^{2})
Russellville	Town	306	358	−14.53%	Putnam		
Russiaville	Town	1,319	1,094	+20.57%	Howard		
St. Joe	Town	418	460	−9.13%	DeKalb		
St. John	Town	20,303	14,850	+36.72%	Lake	12.75 sq mi (33.02 km^{2})	1,603.33/sq mi (619.06/km^{2})
St. Leon	Town	660	678	−2.65%	Dearborn		
St. Paul	Town	960	1,031	−6.89%	Decatur, Shelby		
Salamonia	Town	151	157	−3.82%	Jay		
Salem †	City	6,371	6,319	+0.82%	Washington	4.02 sq mi (10.40 km^{2})	1,593.75/sq mi (615.02/km^{2})
Saltillo	Town	94	92	+2.17%	Washington		
Sandborn	Town	359	415	−13.49%	Knox		
Santa Claus	Town	2,586	2,481	+4.23%	Spencer	6.44 sq mi (16.67 km^{2})	401.68/sq mi (155.09/km^{2})
Saratoga	Town	231	254	−9.06%	Randolph		
Schererville	Town	29,646	29,243	+1.38%	Lake	15.15 sq mi (39.23 km^{2})	1,961.23/sq mi (757.26/km^{2})
Schneider	Town	269	277	−2.89%	Lake		
Scottsburg †	City	7,345	6,747	+8.86%	Scott	5.56 sq mi (14.41 km^{2})	1,325.81/sq mi (511.93/km^{2})
Seelyville	Town	1,012	1,029	−1.65%	Vigo		
Sellersburg	Town	9,310	6,128	+51.93%	Clark	7.47 sq mi (19.35 km^{2})	1,256.24/sq mi (485.01/km^{2})
Selma	Town	747	866	−13.74%	Delaware		
Seymour	City	21,569	17,503	+23.23%	Jackson	11.425 sq mi (29.59 km^{2})	1,777.86/sq mi (686.41/km^{2})
Shadeland	Town	1,757	1,610	+9.13%	Tippecanoe		
Shamrock Lakes	Town	222	231	−3.90%	Blackford		
Sharpsville	Town	553	607	−8.90%	Tipton		
Shelburn	Town	1,107	1,252	−11.58%	Sullivan		
Shelbyville †	City	20,067	19,191	+4.56%	Shelby	12.81 sq mi (33.19 km^{2})	1,599.22/sq mi (617.48/km^{2})
Sheridan	Town	3,106	2,665	+16.55%	Hamilton	2.07 sq mi (5.36 km^{2})	1,499.76/sq mi (579.09/km^{2})
Shipshewana	Town	839	658	+27.51%	LaGrange		
Shirley	Town	819	830	−1.33%	Hancock, Henry		
Shoals †	Town	677	756	−10.45%	Martin		
Sidney	Town	131	83	+57.83%	Kosciusko		
Silver Lake	Town	875	915	−4.37%	Kosciusko		
Somerville	Town	253	293	−13.65%	Gibson		
South Bend †	City	103,453	101,168	+2.26%	St. Joseph	41.46 sq mi (107.4 km^{2})	2,495/sq mi (963/km^{2})
South Whitley	Town	1,818	1,751	+3.83%	Whitley		
Southport	City	1,760	1,712	+2.80%	Marion	0.63 sq mi (1.63 km^{2})	3,380.57/sq mi (1,306.09/km^{2})
Speedway	Town	13,952	11,812	+18.12%	Marion	4.79 sq mi (12.40 km^{2})	2,915.17/sq mi (1,125.55/km^{2})
Spencer †	Town	2,454	2,217	+10.69%	Owen	1.59 sq mi (4.13 km^{2})	1,539.52/sq mi (594.30/km^{2})
Spiceland	Town	958	890	+7.64%	Henry		
Spring Grove	Town	332	344	−3.49%	Wayne		
Spring Hill	Town	95	98	−3.06%	Marion		
Spring Lake	Town	210	218	−3.67%	Hancock		
Springport	Town	131	149	−12.08%	Henry		
Spurgeon	Town	172	207	−16.91%	Pike		
State Line City	Town	120	143	−16.08%	Warren		
Staunton	Town	472	534	−11.61%	Clay		
Stilesville	Town	269	316	−14.87%	Hendricks		
Stinesville	Town	203	198	+2.53%	Monroe		
Straughn	Town	259	222	+16.67%	Henry		
Sullivan †	City	4,089	4,249	−3.77%	Sullivan	1.88 sq mi (4.86 km^{2})	2,274.13/sq mi (878.13/km^{2})
Sulphur Springs	Town	331	399	−17.04%	Henry		
Summitville	Town	989	967	+2.28%	Madison		
Sunman	Town	914	1,049	−12.87%	Ripley		
Swayzee	Town	918	981	−6.42%	Grant		
Sweetser	Town	1,075	1,229	−12.53%	Grant		
Switz City	Town	268	293	−8.53%	Greene		
Syracuse	Town	3,079	2,810	+9.57%	Kosciusko	1.97 sq mi (5.10 km^{2})	1,562.15/sq mi (603.17/km^{2})
Tell City †	City	7,506	7,272	+3.22%	Perry	4.65 sq mi (12.04 km^{2})	1,655.49/sq mi (639.22/km^{2})
Tennyson	Town	213	279	−23.66%	Warrick		
Terre Haute †	City	58,389	60,785	−3.94%	Vigo	35.27 sq mi (91.35 km^{2})	1,761.32/sq mi (680.05/km^{2})
Thorntown	Town	1,432	1,520	−5.79%	Boone		
Tipton †	City	5,275	5,106	+3.31%	Tipton	2.63 sq mi (6.80 km^{2})	2,009.52/sq mi (775.79/km^{2})
Topeka	Town	1,206	1,153	+4.60%	LaGrange		
Town of Pines	Town	594	708	−16.10%	Porter		
Trafalgar	Town	1,422	1,101	+29.16%	Johnson		
Trail Creek	Town	2,060	2,052	+0.39%	LaPorte		
Troy	Town	347	385	−9.87%	Perry		
Ulen	Town	114	117	−2.56%	Boone		
Union City	City	3,385	3,584	−5.55%	Randolph	2.27 sq mi (5.87 km^{2})	1,530.35/sq mi (590.88/km^{2})
Uniondale	Town	271	310	−12.58%	Wells		
Universal	Town	283	362	−21.82%	Vermillion		
Upland	Town	3,821	3,845	−0.62%	Grant	6.44 sq mi (16.69 km^{2})	845.64/sq mi (326.50/km^{2})
Utica	Town	860	776	+10.82%	Clark		
Valparaiso †	City	34,151	31,730	+7.63%	Porter	16.31 sq mi (42.25 km^{2})	2,035.42/sq mi (785.88/km^{2})
Van Buren	Town	790	864	−8.56%	Grant		
Veedersburg	Town	2,098	2,180	−3.76%	Fountain	3.00 sq mi (7.76 km^{2})	700.50/sq mi (270.43/km^{2})
Vera Cruz	Town	72	80	−10.00%	Wells		
Vernon †	Town	236	318	−25.79%	Jennings		
Versailles †	Town	2,184	2,113	+3.36%	Ripley	1.57 sq mi (4.06 km^{2})	1,391.97/sq mi (537.44/km^{2})
Vevay †	Town	1,741	1,683	+3.45%	Switzerland		
Vincennes †	City	16,759	18,423	−9.03%	Knox	7.48 sq mi (19.37 km^{2})	2,261.67/sq mi (873.19/km^{2})
Wabash †	City	10,440	10,666	−2.12%	Wabash	9.87 sq mi (25.57 km^{2})	1,083.44/sq mi (418.33/km^{2})
Wakarusa	Town	1,998	1,758	+13.65%	Elkhart		
Walkerton	Town	2,096	2,144	−2.24%	St. Joseph	1.90 sq mi (4.93 km^{2})	1,100.83/sq mi (425.05/km^{2})
Wallace	Town	79	105	−24.76%	Fountain		
Walton	Town	962	1,049	−8.29%	Cass		
Wanatah	Town	1,009	1,048	−3.72%	LaPorte		
Warren	Town	1,182	1,239	−4.60%	Huntington		
Warren Park	Town	1,490	1,480	+0.68%	Marion		
Warsaw †	City	15,804	13,559	+16.56%	Kosciusko	14.75 sq mi (38.22 km^{2})	1,179.58/sq mi (455/km^{2})
Washington †	City	12,017	11,509	+4.41%	Daviess	6.67 sq mi (17.27 km^{2})	1,890.16/sq mi (729.79/km^{2})
Waterloo	Town	2,116	2,242	−5.62%	DeKalb	2.11 sq mi (5.47 km^{2})	1,002.84/sq mi (387.16/km^{2})
Waveland	Town	427	420	+1.67%	Montgomery		
Waynetown	Town	960	958	+0.21%	Montgomery		
West Baden Springs	Town	541	574	−5.75%	Orange		
West College Corner	Town	545	676	−19.38%	Union		
West Harrison	Town	325	289	+12.46%	Dearborn		
West Lafayette	City	44,595	29,596	+50.68%	Tippecanoe	13.81 sq mi (35.77 km^{2})	3,323.58/sq mi (1,283.22/km^{2})
West Lebanon	Town	678	723	−6.22%	Warren		
West Terre Haute	Town	2,157	2,236	−3.53%	Vigo	0.75 sq mi (1.95 km^{2})	2,864.54/sq mi (1,106.35/km^{2})
Westfield	City	46,410	30,068	+54.35%	Hamilton	29.92 sq mi (77.48 km^{2})	1,253.27/sq mi (483.89/km^{2})
Westport	Town	1,393	1,379	+1.02%	Decatur		
Westville	Town	5,257	5,853	−10.18%	LaPorte	3.25 sq mi (8.42 km^{2})	1,617.04/sq mi (624.34/km^{2})
Wheatfield	Town	904	853	+5.98%	Jasper		
Wheatland	Town	390	480	−18.75%	Knox		
Whiteland	Town	4,599	4,169	+10.31%	Johnson	5.49 sq mi (14.21 km^{2})	840.46/sq mi (324.53/km^{2})
Whitestown	Town	10,178	2,867	+255.01%	Boone	14.02 sq mi (36.32 km^{2})	725.81/sq mi (280.23/km^{2})
Whitewater	Town	71	83	−14.46%	Wayne		
Whiting	City	4,814	4,997	−3.66%	Lake	1.80 sq mi (4.67 km^{2})	2,528.56/sq mi (976.18/km^{2})
Wilkinson	Town	414	449	−7.80%	Hancock		
Williams Creek	Town	430	407	+5.65%	Marion		
Williamsport †	Town	1,950	1,898	+2.74%	Warren		
Winamac †	Town	2,318	2,490	−6.91%	Pulaski	1.36 sq mi (3.53 km^{2})	1,703.16/sq mi (657.42/km^{2})
Winchester †	City	4,566	4,935	−7.48%	Randolph	3.47 sq mi (8.99 km^{2})	1,400.12/sq mi (540.66/km^{2})
Windfall	Town	696	708	−1.69%	Tipton		
Winfield	Town	7,181	4,383	+63.84%	Lake	12.46 sq mi (32.28 km^{2})	579.16/sq mi (223.62/km^{2})
Wingate	Town	237	263	−9.89%	Montgomery		
Winona Lake	Town	5,053	4,908	+2.95%	Kosciusko	3.43 sq mi (8.89 km^{2})	1,720.46/sq mi (664.29/km^{2})
Winslow	Town	764	864	−11.57%	Pike		
Wolcott	Town	950	1,001	−5.09%	White		
Wolcottville	Town	1,004	998	+0.60%	Noble, LaGrange		
Woodburn	City	1,655	1,520	+8.88%	Allen	0.96 sq mi (2.48 km^{2})	1,620.69/sq mi (626.03/km^{2})
Woodlawn Heights	Town	91	79	+15.19%	Madison		
Worthington	Town	1,393	1,463	−4.78%	Greene		
Wynnedale	Town	215	231	−6.93%	Marion		
Yeoman	Town	116	139	−16.55%	Carroll		
Yorktown	Town	11,548	9,405	+22.79%	Delaware	32.17 sq mi (83.32 km^{2})	361.67/sq mi (139.64/km^{2})
Zanesville	Town	580	600	−3.33%	Wells, Allen		
Zionsville	Town	30,903	14,160	+118.24%	Boone	67.34 sq mi (174.41 km^{2})	455.29/sq mi (175.79/km^{2})

== See also ==
- List of metropolitan areas in Indiana
- List of Micropolitan Statistical Areas of Indiana
- List of census-designated places in Indiana
