= List of micropolitan statistical areas of Indiana =

This is a list of micropolitan statistical areas of Indiana. As defined by the United States Census Bureau, a micropolitan area is the area (usually a county or grouping of counties) surrounding and including a core city with population between 10,000 and 49,999 (inclusive). Suburbs of metropolitan areas are generally not considered to be micropolitan core cities, although they can be if they are in another county from the metropolitan core. 2020 population estimates are included for each city and its corresponding micropolitan statistical area.

City	Pop.	Micropolitan Statistical Area	Pop.
Angola	9,340	Steuben County	34,862
Auburn	13,412	DeKalb County	44,330
Bedford	13,792	Lawrence County	45,192
Connersville	13,324	Fayette County	23,335
Crawfordsville	16,306	Montgomery County	38,633
Decatur	9,913	Adams County	36,584
Frankfort	16,715	Clinton County	32,895
Greensburg	12,312	Decatur County	26,421
Huntington	17,022	Huntington County	36,944
Jasper	16,703	Dubois County, Pike County	43,629
Kendallville	10,271	Noble County	47,811
Logansport	18,366	Cass County	37,559
Madison	12,357	Jefferson County	32,921
Marion	28,310	Grant County	66,458
New Castle	17,396	Henry County	49,081
Peru	11,073	Miami County	35,613
Plymouth	10,214	Marshall County	46,464
Richmond	35,720	Wayne County	66,410
Seymour	21,569	Jackson County	47,420
Vincennes	16,759	Knox County	35,872
Wabash	10,440	Wabash County	30,777
Warsaw	15,804	Kosciusko County	80,669
Washington	12,017	Daviess County	34, 097

== See also ==
- List of cities in Indiana
- List of towns in Indiana
- List of metropolitan areas in Indiana
- List of census-designated places in Indiana
- List of micropolitan statistical areas by state
