= Duneland Beach, Indiana =

- Unincorporated community
- Location within Indiana Location within the United States
- Coordinates: 41°45′25″N 86°49′53″W
- Country: United States
- State: Indiana
- County: LaPorte
- Township: Michigan
- Elevation: 597 ft (182 m)
- ZIP code: 46360
- FIPS code: 18-19000
- GNIS feature ID: 2830443

Duneland Beach is an unincorporated community in Michigan Township, LaPorte County, Indiana.

It took its name from the Indiana Dunes.

== Education ==
Duneland Beach residents are served by the Michigan City Public Library. Duneland Beach residents may also request a free library card from any La Porte County Public Library branch.

== Demographics ==
The United States Census Bureau first delineated Duneland Beach as a census designated place in the 2022 American Community Survey.
