= List of metropolitan areas in Indiana =

In 2016, Indiana had five cities with populations of over 100,000: Indianapolis, Carmel, Fort Wayne, Evansville and South Bend. Rounding out the top 10 cities in the state were: Fishers, Bloomington, Hammond, Gary and Lafayette.

The city of Indianapolis had a population of over 860,000 and there were over 2 million people living in the metropolitan area of Indianapolis in 2016. During the same time period, the population of the city of Fort Wayne was almost one-third the size of Indianapolis at close to 264,000 people, with roughly 430,000 in its metropolitan area. The other two cities with populations over 100,000, Evansville and South Bend, both had approximately 269,000 people living in their metropolitan areas.

The following is the list of metropolitan areas in Indiana with population estimates from 2010 through 2021.

== Table ==
Metro city	Population estimates as of July 1												% Change
Metro city	2010	2011	2012	2013	2014	2015	2016	2017	2018	2019	2020	2021	% Change
Bloomington	160,132	161,722	162,852	163,221	164,422	165,073	166,655	167,429	168,092	169,230	160,815	161,321	+0.74%
Columbus	76,818	77,620	79,001	79,655	80,497	81,458	82,231	82,213	82,722	83,779	82,157	82,475	+7.36%
Elkhart–Goshen	197,451	198,279	198,968	200,205	201,423	202,995	203,642	204,194	205,617	206,341	206,842	206,921	+4.80%
Evansville	311,802	312,698	313,422	314,331	314,859	314,983	315,283	314,791	314,660	315,086	313,930	313,946	+0.69%
Fort Wayne	389,298	392,332	394,225	396,638	398,591	400,806	402,887	405,445	409,126	413,263	420,208	423,038	+8.67%
Chicagoland (Gary, IN Metropolitan Division)	708,163	707,978	706,627	705,661	705,792	702,691	700,964	700,547	701,279	703,428	718,555	719,700	+1.63%
Indianapolis-Carmel-Anderson	1,892,640	1,910,719	1,929,678	1,953,600	1,971,006	1,986,119	2,006,760	2,027,584	2,052,368	2,074,537	2,113,700	2,126,804	+12.37%
Kokomo	82,752	82,797	82,839	82,738	82,605	82,338	82,304	82,210	82,257	82,544	83,619	83,687	+1.08%
Lafayette-West Lafayette	210,687	213,230	216,449	219,183	221,445	223,573	227,088	228,101	230,938	233,002	223,679	224,709	+6.66%
Michigan City–La Porte	111,459	111,317	111,304	111,423	111,735	110,835	110,222	109,842	109,981	109,888	112,222	112,390	+0.84%
Muncie	117,665	117,901	117,027	116,831	116,487	115,767	115,657	115,246	114,297	114,135	111,669	111,871	-4.92%
South Bend–Mishawaka	319,044	318,884	318,296	318,639	319,410	319,703	321,144	321,538	322,697	323,613	324,112	323,695	+1.46%
Terre Haute	189,523	189,541	189,555	189,089	188,240	187,365	187,241	186,846	186,726	186,367	184,784	184,910	-2.43%

== See also ==
- List of cities in Indiana
- List of towns in Indiana
- List of Micropolitan Statistical Areas of Indiana
- List of census-designated places in Indiana
