= List of census-designated places in Indiana =

This is a list of census-designated places in the state of Indiana, United States of America.

== A ==
- Aberdeen - Porter County
- Americus - Tippecanoe County
- Arcola - Allen County
- Arlington - Rush County
- Avoca - Lawrence County

== B ==
- Bass Lake – Starke County
- Blanford - Vermillion County
- Bridgeton – Parke County
- Bright – Dearborn County
- Bringhurst - Carroll County
- Buck Creek - Tippecanoe County
- Buffalo – White County
- Burns City - Martin County
- Burrows - Carroll County
- Butlerville - Jennings County

== C ==
- Canaan - Jefferson County
- Clarksburg - Decatur County
- Coalmont - Clay County
- Colburn - Tippecanoe County
- Collegeville – Jasper County
- Cordry Sweetwater Lakes - Brown County
- Country Squire Lakes - Jennings County

== D ==
- Deer Creek - Carroll County
- Deputy - Jefferson County
- Dover Hill - Martin County
- Dresser (also known as Taylorville) - Vigo County
- Dubois - Dubois County
- Dunlap – Elkhart County

== E ==
- East Enterprise - Switzerland County
- Emison - Knox County

== F ==
- Fish Lake - LaPorte County
- Florence - Switzerland County
- Fontanet - Vigo County
- Foster - Warren County
- Fredricksburg - Washington County
- Freelandville - Knox County
- Freetown - Jackson County

== G ==
- Galena – Floyd County
- Granger – St. Joseph County
- Green Hill - Warren County
- Grissom Air Reserve Base - Cass County and Miami County

== H ==
- Hanna - LaPorte County
- Hardinsburg - Washington County
- Harlan - Allen County
- Harrodsburg - Monroe County
- Hatfield - Spencer County
- Hayden - Jennings County
- Hedrick - Warren County
- Henryville – Clark County
- Herbst - Grant County
- Heritage Lake - Putnam County
- Hessen Cassel – Allen County
- Hidden Valley – Dearborn County
- Highland – Vanderburgh County
- Hoagland - Allen County
- Howe - LaGrange County
- Hudson Lake - LaPorte County

== I ==
- Idaville - White County
- Independence - Warren County

== J ==
- Jalapa - Grant County
- Judson – Parke County
- Judyville - Warren County

== K ==
- Kent - Jefferson County
- Kimmell - Noble County
- Kramer - Warren County
- Koontz Lake – Marshall County and Starke County

== L ==
- Lake Dalecarlia – Lake County
- Lake Everett – Allen County
- Lake Holiday – Montgomery County
- Lake Holiday Hideaway – Fountain County
- Lake Santee - Decatur County and Franklin County
- Lake Village – Newton County
- Lakes of the Four Seasons – Lake County and Porter County
- Laketon - Wabash County
- Landess - Grant County
- Lyford – Parke County

== M ==
- Manilla - Rush County
- Marshfield - Warren County
- Melody Hill – Vanderburgh County
- Memphis – Clark County
- Metamora - Franklin County
- Mexico – Miami County
- Mier - Grant County
- Milroy - Rush County
- Montmorenci - Tippecanoe County

== N ==
- New Goshen - Vigo County
- New Paris – Elkhart County
- New Salisbury - Harrison County
- New Trenton - Franklin County
- New Washington – Clark County
- North Terre Haute – Vigo County
- Norway – White County
- Notre Dame - St. Joseph County

== O ==
- Otwell - Pike County
- Owensburg - Greene County

== P ==
- Painted Hills - Morgan County
- Parkers Settlement – Posey County
- Pence - Warren County
- Point Isabel - Grant County
- Purdue University - Tippecanoe County

== R ==
- Raglesville - Daviess County
- Ragsdale - Knox County
- Rainsville - Warren County
- Rockfield - Carroll County
- Rolling Prairie - LaPorte County
- Romney - Tippecanoe County
- Roselawn – Jasper County and Newton County

== S ==
- Saint Bernice - Vermillion County
- Saint Mary-of-the-Woods - Vigo County
- Saint Meinrad - Spencer County
- Salt Creek Commons - Porter County
- San Pierre – Starke County
- Scipio - Jennings County
- Scotland - Greene County
- Shelby - Lake County
- Shepardsville - Vigo County
- Shorewood Forest - Porter County
- Simonton Lake – Elkhart County
- Sims - Grant County
- Smithville-Sanders - Monroe County
- Somerset - Wabash County
- South Haven – Porter County
- Star City – Pulaski County
- Stockwell - Tippecanoe County

== T ==
- Tab - Warren County
- Taylorsville – Bartholomew County
- Tecumseh - Vigo County
- Templeton - Benton County
- Toad Hop - Vigo County
- Tri-Lakes – Whitley County

== V ==
- Vallonia - Jackson County
- Van Bibber Lake - Putnam County

== W ==
- Waldron - Shelby County
- West Point - Tippecanoe County
- Westphalia - Knox County
- Wheeler - Porter County
- Williams - Lawrence County

== See also ==
- List of cities in Indiana
- List of towns in Indiana
- List of metropolitan areas in Indiana
- List of Micropolitan Statistical Areas of Indiana
