= Michigan City High School =

Location
- 8466 West Pahs Road; Michigan City, Indiana 46360; United States; 41°40′42″N 86°51′46″W

Information
- Type: Public high school
- School district: Michigan City Area Schools
- Principal: Mr. Lucas Snyder
- Teaching staff: 92.98 (FTE)
- Grades: 9–12
- Enrollment: 1,531 (2023–2024)
- Student to teacher ratio: 16.47
- Color
- Athletics conference: Duneland Athletic Conference
- Mascot: Wolfie
- Nickname: Wolves
- Newspaper: Cityzen
- Yearbook: Alpha
- Website: mchs.educatemc.net

Michigan City High School is located in Michigan City, Indiana. It is a part of the Michigan City Area Schools school district.

In addition to Michigan City, the district (of which, this is the sole comprehensive high school), covers Long Beach, Michiana Shores, Pottawattamie Park, and Trail Creek in LaPorte County, as well as Beverly Shores and the Town of Pines in Porter County.

== History ==
Michigan City High School was formed by the merger of Rogers High School and Elston High School in 1995. Michigan City High School is located on the former campus of Rogers High School.

== Demographics ==
The demographic breakdown of the 1,801 students enrolled as of the 2012–2013 school year is as follows:

- Male - 50.3%
- Female - 49.7%
- American Indian/Alaskan - 0.4%
- Asian/Pacific Islander - 0.7%
- Black - 30.9%
- Hispanic - 6.8%
- White - 54.4%
- Multiracial - 6.8%

== Athletics ==
Michigan City High School is a member of the Duneland Athletic Conference. MCHS is a class 5A school for boys' football and a class 4A school for all other sports, and is a member of the Indiana High School Athletic Association. Students participate in Men and Women's Soccer, Men and Women's Golf, Tennis, Swimming, Diving, Basketball, Track, Field, and Cross Country; as well as Softball, Baseball, Wrestling, Cheerleading, Football, Gymnastics, and Volleyball. In 1995, the volleyball team won the Indiana state championship. In addition, Elston High School won the following state titles: Boys' basketball - 1966; girls' cross country - 1993, 1994; and boys' golf - 1940. Rogers High School won state championships in girls' golf in 1981 and 1982.

=== The Wolves Den ===
Michigan City High School houses Indiana's eighth largest public high school gymnasium, "The Wolves' Den." The Wolves' Den is also the ninth largest high school gymnasium in the United States, with a seating capacity of 7,304.

=== Ames Field ===
The original Ames Field was home to the Michigan City White Caps from 1956 to 1959. The original multipurpose sports facility was demolished in 1995 to make room for expanded stadium. Ames Field is named after George Ames, an early businessman and mayor of Michigan City in the late 1800s. In the spring of 2009, the stadium's playing surface was replaced with artificial field turf at the price $718,396 in lieu of re-sodding the heavily damaged turf.

== Extracurricular activities ==
Available at Michigan City High School are: National Honor Society, Rho Kappa, Student Council, Morning Broadcasting, Tech Club, Show Choir, Marching Band, Jazz Band, Pep Band, Drama Society, Japanese Club, French Club, Spanish Club, German Club, Wolvettes Dancing, Peer Tutoring, Ping Pong Club, Wednesdays with Yarn, Science Olympiad, Quiz Bowl, Junior Engineering Technical Society (JETS) TEAMS, and Art Club.

In March 2010, the MCHS Japanese department's Level 3 and 4 teams, won two state titles from the Japanese Olympiad of Indiana (JOI). This event, which tests students' knowledge of Japanese culture, history and society, was held at Valparaiso High School, attracted some 200 students from 15 high schools.

== Notable alumni ==
- Braden Fiske, NFL player for the Los Angeles Rams
- Jarrod Jones, basketball player in the Israeli Basketball Premier League
- Christopher Raia, 22nd deputy director of the FBI and law enforcement officer

== See also ==
- List of high schools in Indiana
