= George and Adele Jaworowski House =

Historic house in Indiana, United States

- U.S. National Register of Historic Places
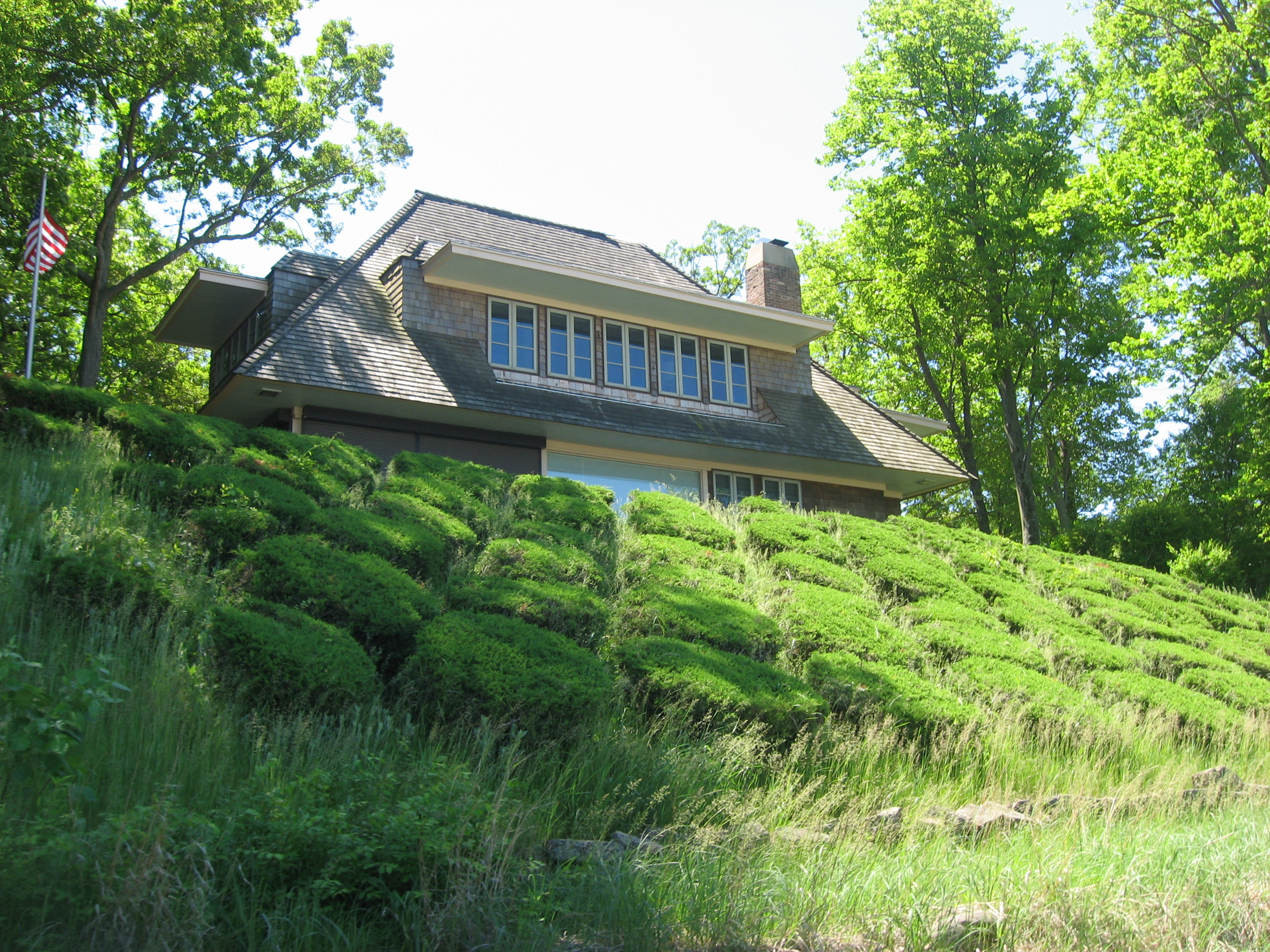
- George and Adele Jaworowski House, June 2013

- Location within Indiana Location within the United States
- Location: 3501 Lake Shore Dr. in Duneland Beach, Michigan Township, LaPorte County, Indiana
- Coordinates: 41°45′28″N 86°49′44″W
- Area: Less than 1 acre (0.40 ha)
- Built: 1945-1946
- Architect: Wright, John Lloyd
- Architectural style: Prairie School
- MPS: John Lloyd Wright in Northwest Indiana
- NRHP reference No.: 13000088
- Added to NRHP: August 1, 2013

George and Adele Jaworowski House, also known as Early Birds, is a historic home located in Michigan Township, LaPorte County, Indiana. It was designed by architect John Lloyd Wright and built in 1945–1946. The house is atop and carved into a sand dune on the shore of Lake Michigan. The house is in the Prairie School of architecture and has a high pitched hipped roof with wide overhanging eaves and dormer. Also contributing is the house site.

It was listed on the National Register of Historic Places in 2013.
