= List of micropolitan statistical areas by state =

Here is a list of micropolitan statistical areas in the United States. As defined by the United States Census Bureau, a micropolitan statistical area is the area (usually a county or grouping of counties) surrounding and including a core city with population between 10,000 and 49,999 (inclusive). Suburbs of metropolitan areas are generally not considered to be micropolitan core cities, although they can be if they are in another county from the metropolitan core.

The states of New Jersey and Rhode Island do not have micropolitan areas as defined by the US Census Bureau.

== Alabama ==
- Albertville
- Alexander City
- Cullman
- Enterprise-Ozark
- Eufaula
- Fort Payne
- Scottsboro
- Selma
- Talladega-Sylacauga
- Troy
- Tuskegee
- Valley

== Alaska ==
- Juneau
- Ketchikan
- Kodiak

== Arizona ==
- Nogales
- Payson
- Safford
- Show Low

== Arkansas ==
- Arkadelphia
- Batesville
- Blytheville
- Camden
- El Dorado
- Forrest City
- Harrison
- Hope
- Magnolia
- Mountain Home
- Paragould
- Russellville
- Searcy
- West Helena

== California ==
- Bishop
- Clearlake
- Crescent City
- Eureka-Arcata-Fortuna
- Phoenix Lake-Cedar Ridge
- Red Bluff
- Susanville
- Truckee-Grass Valley
- Ukiah

== Colorado ==
- Cañon City
- Durango
- Edwards
- Glenwood Springs
- Fort Morgan
- Montrose
- Silverthorne
- Sterling

== Connecticut ==
- Torrington
- Willimantic

== Delaware ==
- Seaford

== Florida ==
- Arcadia
- Clewiston
- Homosassa Springs
- Key West
- Lake City
- Okeechobee
- Palatka
- Sebring
- The Villages
- Wauchula

== Georgia ==
- Americus
- Bainbridge
- Calhoun
- Cedartown
- Cordele
- Cornelia
- Douglas
- Dublin
- Fitzgerald
- Fort Valley
- Jesup
- LaGrange
- Milledgeville
- Moultrie
- St. Marys
- Statesboro
- Summerville
- Thomaston
- Thomasville
- Tifton
- Toccoa
- Vidalia
- Waycross

== Hawaii ==
- Hilo
- Kahului-Wailuku
- Kapaa

== Idaho ==
- Blackfoot (includes Bingham County)
- Burley (includes Cassia and Minidoka Counties)
- Moscow (includes Latah County)
- Mountain Home (includes Elmore County)
- Rexburg (includes Fremont and Madison Counties)

== Illinois ==
- Canton
- Carbondale
- Centralia
- Charleston-Mattoon
- Dixon
- Effingham
- Freeport
- Galesburg
- Harrisburg
- Jacksonville
- Lincoln
- Macomb
- Marion-Herrin
- Mount Vernon
- Ottawa
- Pontiac
- Quincy
- Rochelle
- Sterling
- Taylorville
- West Frankfort

== Indiana ==
- Angola
- Auburn
- Bedford
- Connersville
- Crawfordsville
- Decatur
- Frankfort
- Greensburg
- Huntington
- Jasper
- Kendallville
- Logansport
- Madison
- Marion
- New Castle
- North Vernon
- Peru
- Plymouth
- Richmond
- Scottsburg
- Seymour
- Vincennes
- Wabash
- Warsaw
- Washington

== Iowa ==
- Boone
- Burlington
- Clinton
- Fort Dodge
- Fort Madison-Keokuk
- Marshalltown
- Mason City
- Muscatine
- Newton
- Oskaloosa
- Ottumwa
- Pella
- Spencer
- Spirit Lake
- Storm Lake

== Kansas ==
- Atchison
- Coffeyville
- Dodge City
- Emporia
- Garden City
- Great Bend
- Hays
- Hutchinson
- Kansas City
- Lawrence
- Liberal
- Manhattan
- McPherson
- Parsons
- Pittsburg
- Salina
- Topeka
- Wichita
- Winfield

== Kentucky ==
- Campbellsville
- Central City
- Corbin
- Danville
- Frankfort
- Glasgow
- London
- Madisonville
- Mayfield
- Maysville
- Middlesboro
- Mount Sterling
- Murray
- Paducah
- Richmond-Berea
- Somerset

== Louisiana ==
- Abbeville
- Bastrop
- Bogalusa
- Crowley
- De Ridder
- Fort Johnson South
- Hammond
- Jennings
- Minden
- Morgan City
- Natchitoches
- New Iberia
- Opelousas-Eunice
- Pierre Part
- Ruston
- Tallulah

== Maine ==
- Augusta-Waterville
- Rockland

== Maryland ==
- Cambridge
- Easton
- Lexington Park

== Massachusetts ==
- Greenfield
- Nantucket
- Vineyard Haven

== Michigan ==
- Adrian
- Allegan
- Alma
- Alpena
- Big Rapids
- Cadillac
- Coldwater
- Escanaba
- Houghton
- Iron Mountain
- Ludington
- Marquette
- Midland
- Mount Pleasant
- Owosso
- Sault Ste. Marie
- Sturgis
- Traverse City

== Minnesota ==
- Albert Lea
- Alexandria
- Austin
- Bemidji
- Brainerd
- Fairmont
- Faribault-Northfield
- Fergus Falls
- Grand Rapids
- Hutchinson
- Mankato-North Mankato
- Marshall
- New Ulm
- Owatonna
- Red Wing
- Willmar
- Winona
- Worthington

== Mississippi ==
- Brookhaven
- Clarksdale
- Cleveland
- Columbus
- Corinth
- Greenville
- Greenwood
- Grenada
- Indianola
- Laurel
- McComb
- Meridian
- Natchez
- Oxford
- Picayune
- Starkville
- Tupelo
- Vicksburg
- West Point
- Yazoo City

== Missouri ==
- Branson
- Cape Girardeau-Jackson
- Farmington
- Fort Leonard Wood
- Hannibal
- Kennett
- Kirksville
- Lebanon
- Marshall
- Maryville
- Mexico
- Moberly
- Poplar Bluff
- Rolla
- Sedalia
- Sikeston
- Warrensburg
- West Plains

== Montana ==
- Bozeman
- Butte-Silver Bow
- Havre
- Helena
- Kalispell

== Nebraska ==
- Beatrice
- Columbus
- Fremont
- Hastings
- Kearney
- Lexington
- Norfolk
- North Platte
- Scottsbluff

== Nevada ==
- Elko
- Fallon
- Gardnerville Ranchos
- Pahrump

== New Hampshire ==
- Berlin
- Claremont–Lebanon
- Concord
- Keene
- Laconia

== New Mexico ==
- Alamogordo
- Carlsbad-Artesia
- Clovis
- Deming
- Espanola
- Gallup
- Grants
- Hobbs
- Las Vegas
- Los Alamos
- Portales
- Roswell
- Ruidoso
- Silver City
- Taos

== New York ==
- Amsterdam
- Auburn
- Batavia
- Corning
- Cortland
- Gloversville
- Hudson
- Jamestown-Dunkirk-Fredonia
- Malone
- Ogdensburg-Massena
- Olean
- Oneonta
- Plattsburgh
- Seneca Falls
- Watertown-Fort Drum

== North Carolina ==
- Albemarle
- Boone
- Brevard
- Dunn
- Elizabeth City
- Forest City
- Henderson
- Kill Devil Hills
- Kinston
- Laurinburg
- Lincolnton
- Lumberton
- Morehead City
- Mount Airy
- North Wilkesboro
- Roanoke Rapids
- Rockingham
- Salisbury
- Sanford
- Shelby
- Southern Pines-Pinehurst
- Statesville-Mooresville
- Thomasville-Lexington
- Washington
- Wilson

== North Dakota ==
- Dickinson
- Jamestown
- Wahpeton
- Williston

== Ohio ==
- Ashland
- Ashtabula
- Athens
- Bellefontaine
- Bucyrus
- Cambridge
- Celina
- Chillicothe
- Coshocton
- Defiance
- East Liverpool-Salem
- Findlay
- Fremont
- Greenville
- Marion
- Mt. Vernon
- New Philadelphia-Dover
- Norwalk
- Portsmouth
- Sidney
- Tiffin-Fostoria
- Urbana
- Van Wert
- Wapakoneta
- Washington
- Wilmington
- Wooster
- Zanesville

== Oklahoma ==
- Ada
- Altus
- Ardmore
- Bartlesville
- Duncan
- Durant
- Elk City
- Enid
- Guymon
- McAlester
- Miami
- Muskogee
- Ponca City
- Shawnee
- Stillwater
- Tahlequah
- Woodwardk

== Oregon ==
- Albany-Lebanon
- Astoria
- Brookings
- The Dalles
- Coos Bay
- Grants Pass
- Hood River
- Klamath Falls
- La Grande
- Ontario
- Pendleton–Hermiston
- Prineville
- Roseburg

== Pennsylvania ==
- Bradford
- DuBois
- Huntingdon
- Indiana
- Lewisburg
- Lewistown
- Lock Haven
- Meadville
- New Castle
- Oil City
- Pottsville
- Sayre
- Selinsgrove
- Somerset
- Sunbury
- Warren

== Puerto Rico ==
- Adjuntas
- Coamo
- Jayuya
- Santa Isabel
- Utuado

== South Carolina ==
- Bennettsville
- Chester
- Dillon
- Gaffney
- Georgetown
- Greenwood
- Hilton Head Island-Beaufort
- Lancaster
- Newberry
- Orangeburg
- Seneca
- Union
- Walterboro

== South Dakota ==
- Aberdeen
- Brookings
- Huron
- Mitchell
- Pierre
- Spearfish
- Vermillion
- Watertown
- Yankton

== Tennessee ==
- Athens
- Brownsville
- Columbia
- Cookeville
- Crossville
- Dyersburg
- Greeneville
- Harriman
- Humboldt
- La Follette
- Lawrenceburg
- Lewisburg
- Martin-Union City
- McMinnville
- Newport
- Paris
- Sevierville
- Shelbyville
- Tullahoma

== Texas ==
- Alice
- Andrews
- Athens
- Bay City
- Beeville
- Big Spring
- Bonham
- Borger
- Brenham
- Brownwood
- Cleburne
- Commerce
- Corsicana
- Del Rio
- Dumas
- Eagle Pass
- El Campo
- Gainesville
- Granbury
- Hereford
- Huntsville
- Jacksonville
- Kerrville
- Kingsville
- Lamesa
- Levelland
- Lufkin
- Marble Falls
- Marshall
- Mineral Wells
- Mount Pleasant-Pittsburg
- Nacogdoches
- Palestine
- Pampa
- Paris
- Pecos
- Plainview
- Raymondville
- Rio Grande City-Roma
- San Marcos
- Snyder
- Stephenville
- Sulphur Springs
- Sweetwater
- Uvalde
- Vernon

== Utah ==
- Cedar City
- Heber
- Price
- Summit Park
- Vernal

== Vermont ==
- Barre
- Bennington
- Rutland

== Virginia ==
- Culpeper
- Martinsville
- Staunton-Waynesboro

== Washington ==
- Aberdeen
- Centralia
- Ellensburg
- Moses Lake
- Oak Harbor
- Port Angeles
- Pullman
- Shelton
- Walla Walla

== West Virginia ==
- Beckley
- Bluefield
- Clarksburg
- Fairmont
- Oak Hill
- Point Pleasant

== Wisconsin ==
- Baraboo
- Beaver Dam
- Manitowoc
- Marinette
- Menomonie
- Merrill
- Monroe
- Platteville
- Stevens Point
- Watertown-Fort Atkinson
- Whitewater
- Wisconsin Rapids-Marshfield

== Wyoming ==
- Evanston
- Gillette
- Jackson
- Laramie
- Riverton
- Rock Springs
- Sheridan

== Footnotes ==
1. Part of this micropolitan statistical area is also in the state of Iowa.
2. Part of this micropolitan statistical area is also in the state of Illinois.
3. Part of this micropolitan statistical area is also in the states of Illinois & Missouri.
4. The legal definition of this micropolitan statistical area excludes a substantial part of its core city. This area is defined strictly as Whitley County, Kentucky; however, more than 20% of the population of Corbin lives in Knox County, Kentucky.
5. Part of this micropolitan statistical area is also in the state of Illinois.
6. Part of this micropolitan statistical area is also in the state of Wisconsin.
7. Part of this micropolitan statistical area is also in the state of Louisiana.
8. Part of this micropolitan statistical area is also in the state of Vermont.
9. Part of this micropolitan statistical area is also in the state of Vermont.
10. Part of this micropolitan statistical area is also in the state of Minnesota.
11. Part of this micropolitan statistical area is also in the state of Idaho.
12. Part of this micropolitan statistical area is also in the state of Virginia.
13. Part of this micropolitan statistical area is also in the state of Ohio.
14. Part of this micropolitan statistical area is also in the state of Michigan.
15. Part of this micropolitan statistical area is also in the state of Idaho.
