= Michigan Township, LaPorte County, Indiana =

Michigan Township
- Township
- Coordinates: 41°43′33″N 86°52′33″W
- Country: United States
- State: Indiana
- County: LaPorte

Government
  - Type: Indiana township

Area
  - Total: 27.43 sq mi (71.0 km^{2})
  - Land: 17.91 sq mi (46.4 km^{2})
  - Water: 9.52 sq mi (24.7 km^{2})
- Elevation: 610 ft (186 m)

Population (2020)
  - Total: 27,517
  - Density: 1,536.3/sq mi (593.2/km^{2})
- FIPS code: 18-48780
- GNIS feature ID: 453621

Michigan Township is one of twenty-one townships in LaPorte County, Indiana. As of the 2020 census, its population was 27,517 (slightly down from 27,522 at 2010) and it contained 13,431 housing units.

== History ==
Michigan Township was organized in 1833, and named from Lake Michigan, which forms its northwestern border.

The George and Adele Jaworowski House (1945–1946) was listed on the National Register of Historic Places in 2013.

== Geography ==
According to the 2010 census, the township has a total area of 27.43 square miles (71.0 km^{2}), of which 17.91 square miles (46.4 km^{2}) (or 65.29%) is land and 9.52 square miles (24.7 km^{2}) (or 34.71%) is water.

=== Cities and Towns ===
==== City ====
- Michigan City (vast majority)

==== Towns ====
- Long Beach
- Michiana Shores (vast majority)
- Pottawatamie Park
- Trail Creek (upper half)

==== Other Community ====
- Duneland Beach
