= Michigan City Area Schools =

School district in Indiana

Michigan City Area Schools is a school district based in Michigan City, Indiana in LaPorte County. It serves students in Michigan City and several adjacent towns and villages. It operates one high school, two middle schools, and eight elementary schools. Two schools, Elston Middle School and Niemann Elementary School, closed at the end of the 2013/2014 school year.

In addition to Michigan City, the district, in LaPorte County, covers Long Beach, Michiana Shores, Pottawattamie Park, and Trail Creek. The district covers almost all of Coolspring Township and all of Springfield Township. It also extends into Porter County, where it includes Beverly Shores and the Town of Pines. In that county, the district covers most of Pine Township.

== Current Facilities ==
=== Career and Technical Education ===
==== A K Smith Career Center ====
A part of the Elston property A K Smith Career Center was built in 1966 and is still serving the community as a career center. It is named after a former Michigan City Area Schools superintendent.

=== High and Middle Schools ===
School	Mascot	Address	Enrollment (as of 2009–2010)
Michigan City High School	Wolves	8466 W Pahs Road	1899
Barker Middle School	Wolves (formerly Crusaders)	319 E Barker Road	381
Martin T Krueger Middle School	Wolves (formerly Colts)	2001 Springland Avenue	408

==== Elston ====
Built in 1909 as a high school. In 1924 a junior high school was added to the property. The high school served the community until 1995 when all area high school students began attending Michigan City High School, which, prior to 1995 was known as Rogers. The junior high portion served until 2014.

=== Elementary schools ===
School	Mascot	Address	Enrollment (as of 2009–2010)
Springfield Elementary School	Sharks (Formerly Indians)	3054 W 800 N	390
Pine Elementary School	Panthers	1660 County Line Road	298
Lake Hills Elementary School	Lions	201 Ferguson Road	317
Marsh Elementary School	Tigers	400 E Homer Street	274
Knapp Elementary School	Knights	321 Bolka Avenue	401
Joy Elementary School	Vikings	1600 E Coolspring Avenue	349
Edgewood Elementary School	Eagles	502 Boyd Circle	359
Coolspring Elementary School	Wildcats	9121 W 300 N	372

== Former schools ==
Two schools closed in 2014: Elston Middle School and Niemann Elementary School.
