= Michiana Shores, Indiana =

- Town
- Location of Michiana Shores in LaPorte County, Indiana.
- Coordinates: 41°45′23″N 86°49′05″W
- Country: United States
- State: Indiana
- County: LaPorte
- Township: Springfield, Michigan

Area
  - Total: 0.35 sq mi (0.90 km^{2})
  - Land: 0.35 sq mi (0.90 km^{2})
  - Water: 0 sq mi (0.00 km^{2})
- Elevation: 604 ft (184 m)

Population (2020)
  - Total: 306
  - Density: 878.7/sq mi (339.26/km^{2})
- Time zone: UTC-6 (Central (CST))
  - Summer (DST): UTC-5 (CDT)
- ZIP code: 46360
- Area code: 219
- FIPS code: 18-48744
- GNIS feature ID: 2396756
- Website: townofmichianashores.in.gov

Michiana Shores is a town in Springfield and Michigan townships, LaPorte County, Indiana, United States. As of the 2020 census, Michiana Shores had a population of 306. It is included in the Michigan City, Indiana-La Porte, Indiana Metropolitan Statistical Area. Michiana Shores is located in northwesternmost Springfield Township, and is the township's sole incorporated community.

Michiana Shores takes its name from the Michiana region along the Michigan-Indiana border.

== Geography ==
According to the 2010 census, Michiana Shores has a total area of 0.35 square miles (0.91 km^{2}), all land.

The town lies on the shore of Lake Michigan, just south of the Michigan state line. The town is adjacent to Michiana, Michigan, and also neighbors Long Beach, Indiana along the coast to the west.

== Demographics ==
Historical population
Census	Pop.	Note	%±
1950	107		—
1960	229		114.0%
1970	449		96.1%
1980	464		3.3%
1990	378		−18.5%
2000	330		−12.7%
2010	313		−5.2%
2020	306		−2.2%
U.S. Decennial Census

=== 2010 census ===
As of the census of 2010, there were 313 people, 161 households, and 93 families living in the town. The population density was 894.3 inhabitants per square mile (345.3/km^{2}). There were 340 housing units at an average density of 971.4 per square mile (375.1/km^{2}). The racial makeup of the town was 97.4% White, 0.3% Native American, and 2.2% from two or more races. Hispanic or Latino of any race were 2.9% of the population.

There were 161 households, of which 11.8% had children under the age of 18 living with them, 51.6% were married couples living together, 3.7% had a female householder with no husband present, 2.5% had a male householder with no wife present, and 42.2% were non-families. 37.9% of all households were made up of individuals, and 19.2% had someone living alone who was 65 years of age or older. The average household size was 1.94 and the average family size was 2.55.

The median age in the town was 57.8 years. 10.9% of residents were under the age of 18; 3.9% were between the ages of 18 and 24; 10.5% were from 25 to 44; 47.3% were from 45 to 64; and 27.5% were 65 years of age or older. The gender makeup of the town was 49.2% male and 50.8% female.

=== 2000 census ===
As of the census of 2000, there were 330 people, 162 households, and 99 families living in the town. The population density was 954.0 inhabitants per square mile (368.3/km^{2}). There were 339 housing units at an average density of 980.0 per square mile (378.4/km^{2}). The racial makeup of the town was 92.12% White, 0.30% African American, 0.30% Native American, 3.33% Asian, 0.30% from other races, and 3.64% from two or more races. Hispanic or Latino of any race were 1.21% of the population.

There were 162 households, out of which 16.7% had children under the age of 18 living with them, 53.7% were married couples living together, 5.6% had a female householder with no husband present, and 38.3% were non-families. 32.7% of all households were made up of individuals, and 13.6% had someone living alone who was 65 years of age or older. The average household size was 2.04 and the average family size was 2.58.

In the town, the population was spread out, with 14.8% under the age of 18, 3.0% from 18 to 24, 22.1% from 25 to 44, 33.3% from 45 to 64, and 26.7% who were 65 years of age or older. The median age was 50 years. For every 100 females, there were 101.2 males. For every 100 females age 18 and over, there were 97.9 males.

The median income for a household in the town was $46,250, and the median income for a family was $64,750. Males had a median income of $42,333 versus $30,750 for females. The per capita income for the town was $30,633. None of the families and 2.5% of the population were living below the poverty line, including no under eighteens and 4.9% of those over 64.

== History ==
The inland part of Michiana Shores was the site of the logging town of Corymbo in the 1860s and 1870s. Corymbo, located on the Michigan Central railroad, was home to a mixture of lumbermen and railroad employees. A post office was established there in 1861, but had been discontinued by 1880. The land was owned by the local Burgwald family, which sold it in the 1920s to the Long Beach Land Company.

The modern-day beach community began to be developed in the 1930s, when developers Orphie Gotto and Clarence Mathias began to build it as a log cabin town for vacationers. Many of the early residents were schoolteachers from Chicago. The town was incorporated in 1947.

== Education ==
Michigan City Area Schools is the school district covering the municipality. For this municipality, the zoned elementary school is Springfield Elementary School, and the zoned middle school is Krueger Middle School. Michigan City High School is the district's sole comprehensive high school.

Michiana Shores residents are served by the Michigan City Public Library. Michiana Shores residents may also request a free library card from any La Porte County Public Library branch.
