= Silverthorne micropolitan area =

Coordinates: 39°30′N 106°03′W

Map of the Silverthorne micropolitan statistical area

The Silverthorne micropolitan area is a United States Census Bureau defined micropolitan statistical area located in the Silverthorne area of the State of Colorado. The Silverthorne micropolitan statistical area is defined as Summit County, Colorado. The micropolitan statistical area had a population of 23,548 at the 2000 Census. A July 1, 2009 U.S. Census Bureau estimate placed the population at 27,239.

The Silverthorne micropolitan statistical area includes the Town of Silverthorne, the Town of Blue River, the Town of Breckenridge, the Town of Dillon, the Town of Frisco, the Town of Montezuma, and the unincorporated areas of Summit County.

== See also ==
- Summit County, Colorado
- List of statistical areas in Colorado
- List of United States combined statistical areas
- List of United States metropolitan statistical areas
- List of United States micropolitan statistical areas
- List of United States primary statistical areas
- Census statistical areas adjacent to the Silverthorne Micropolitan Statistical Area:
  - Denver-Aurora Metropolitan Statistical Area
  - Denver-Aurora-Boulder Combined Statistical Area
  - Edwards Micropolitan Statistical Area
