= Trail Creek, Indiana =

- Town
- Seal

- Location of Trail Creek in LaPorte County, Indiana.
- Coordinates: 41°41′50″N 86°51′26″W
- Country: United States
- State: Indiana
- County: LaPorte
- Township: Coolspring, Michigan

Area
  - Total: 1.22 sq mi (3.15 km^{2})
  - Land: 1.22 sq mi (3.15 km^{2})
  - Water: 0 sq mi (0.00 km^{2})
- Elevation: 627 ft (191 m)

Population (2020)
  - Total: 2,060
  - Density: 1,693.1/sq mi (653.71/km^{2})
- Time zone: UTC-6 (Central (CST))
  - Summer (DST): UTC-5 (CDT)
- ZIP code: 46360
- Area code: 219
- FIPS code: 18-76328
- GNIS feature ID: 0444853
- Website: www.in.gov/towns/trailcreek/

Trail Creek is a town in Coolspring and Michigan townships, LaPorte County, Indiana, United States. The population was 2,060 at the 2020 census. It is included in the Michigan City, Indiana-La Porte, Indiana Metropolitan Statistical Area.

== History ==
Trail Creek was founded upon the river Trail Creek, from which it took its name. It was incorporated as a town in 1924.

== Geography ==
According to the 2010 census, Trail Creek has a total area of 1.21 square miles (3.13 km^{2}), all land.

== Demographics ==
Historical population
Census	Pop.	Note	%±
1930	295		—
1940	326		10.5%
1950	817		150.6%
1960	1,552		90.0%
1970	2,697		73.8%
1980	2,581		−4.3%
1990	2,463		−4.6%
2000	2,296		−6.8%
2010	2,052		−10.6%
2020	2,060		0.4%
Source: US Census Bureau

=== 2020 census ===
As of the 2020 census, Trail Creek had a population of 2,060. The median age was 48.9 years. 16.7% of residents were under the age of 18 and 26.6% of residents were 65 years of age or older. For every 100 females there were 100.8 males, and for every 100 females age 18 and over there were 96.7 males age 18 and over.

97.0% of residents lived in urban areas, while 3.0% lived in rural areas.

There were 903 households in Trail Creek, of which 23.9% had children under the age of 18 living in them. Of all households, 49.5% were married-couple households, 18.6% were households with a male householder and no spouse or partner present, and 22.8% were households with a female householder and no spouse or partner present. About 26.0% of all households were made up of individuals and 15.3% had someone living alone who was 65 years of age or older.

There were 960 housing units, of which 5.9% were vacant. The homeowner vacancy rate was 1.3% and the rental vacancy rate was 6.7%.

Racial composition as of the 2020 census
Race	Number	Percent
White	1,733	84.1%
Black or African American	143	6.9%
American Indian and Alaska Native	14	0.7%
Asian	13	0.6%
Native Hawaiian and Other Pacific Islander	0	0.0%
Some other race	16	0.8%
Two or more races	141	6.8%
Hispanic or Latino (of any race)	106	5.1%

=== 2010 census ===
As of the census of 2010, there were 2,052 people, 885 households, and 585 families living in the town. The population density was 1,695.9 inhabitants per square mile (654.8/km^{2}). There were 933 housing units at an average density of 771.1 per square mile (297.7/km^{2}). The racial makeup of the town was 91.2% White, 5.5% African American, 0.2% Native American, 0.6% Asian, 1.2% from other races, and 1.3% from two or more races. Hispanic or Latino of any race were 3.3% of the population.

There were 885 households, of which 24.3% had children under the age of 18 living with them, 53.7% were married couples living together, 9.0% had a female householder with no husband present, 3.4% had a male householder with no wife present, and 33.9% were non-families. 29.0% of all households were made up of individuals, and 14.3% had someone living alone who was 65 years of age or older. The average household size was 2.32 and the average family size was 2.85.

The median age in the town was 46.5 years. 19.4% of residents were under the age of 18; 7.4% were between the ages of 18 and 24; 21.3% were from 25 to 44; 30.9% were from 45 to 64; and 21.2% were 65 years of age or older. The gender makeup of the town was 50.4% male and 49.6% female.

=== 2000 census ===
As of the census of 2000, there were 2,296 people, 932 households, and 699 families living in the town. The population density was 1,884.6 inhabitants per square mile (727.6/km^{2}). There were 956 housing units at an average density of 784.7 per square mile (303.0/km^{2}). The racial makeup of the town was 95.12% White, 2.70% African American, 0.48% Asian, 0.22% from other races, and 1.48% from two or more races. Hispanic or Latino of any race were 1.22% of the population.

There were 932 households, out of which 28.2% had children under the age of 18 living with them, 64.6% were married couples living together, 6.8% had a female householder with no husband present, and 25.0% were non-families. 22.1% of all households were made up of individuals, and 12.3% had someone living alone who was 65 years of age or older. The average household size was 2.46 and the average family size was 2.87.

In the town, the population was spread out, with 21.7% under the age of 18, 5.0% from 18 to 24, 25.2% from 25 to 44, 27.3% from 45 to 64, and 20.8% who were 65 years of age or older. The median age was 44 years. For every 100 females, there were 97.8 males. For every 100 females age 18 and over, there were 91.6 males.

The median income for a household in the town was $43,750, and the median income for a family was $51,098. Males had a median income of $41,250 versus $26,031 for females. The per capita income for the town was $20,289. About 3.0% of families and 5.3% of the population were below the poverty line, including 7.3% of those under age 18 and 11.1% of those age 65 or over.

== Features ==
Trail Creek is home to Nelson Park, which has two baseball fields, a basketball court, a swingset and jungle gym. The name derives from Trail Creek, a creek which empties into Lake Michigan, forming the harbor for Michigan City, Indiana. This creek served as a trail to the interior of LaPorte County.

== Education ==
Michigan City Area Schools is the school district covering the municipality. For this municipality, the zoned elementary school for almost all areas is Joy Elementary School, with some portions to the south zoned to Edgewood Elementary School. The zoned middle school is Krueger Middle School, and Michigan City High School is the district's sole comprehensive high school.

Trail Creek residents are served by the Michigan City Public Library. Trail Creek residents may also request a free library card from any La Porte County Public Library branch.
