= Pottawattamie Park, Indiana =

Pottawattomie Park, Indiana
- Town
- Logo

- Location of Pottawattamie Park in LaPorte County, Indiana.
- Coordinates: 41°43′24″N 86°52′02″W
- Country: United States
- State: Indiana
- County: LaPorte
- Township: Michigan

Area
  - Total: 0.25 sq mi (0.64 km^{2})
  - Land: 0.25 sq mi (0.64 km^{2})
  - Water: 0 sq mi (0.00 km^{2})
- Elevation: 623 ft (190 m)

Population (2020)
  - Total: 242
  - Density: 985.1/sq mi (380.34/km^{2})
- Time zone: UTC-6 (Central (CST))
  - Summer (DST): UTC-5 (CDT)
- ZIP code: 46360
- Area code: 219
- FIPS code: 18-61488
- GNIS feature ID: 2396865
- Website: www.townofpottawattomieparkin.org

Pottawattamie Park is a town in Michigan Township, LaPorte County, Indiana, United States. The population was 242 at the 2020 census. It is included in the Michigan City, Indiana-La Porte, Indiana Metropolitan Statistical Area.

== History ==
Pottawattamie Park was incorporated in 1936 on land once inhabited by the Potawatomi Indians.

== Geography ==
Pottawattamie Park is completely surrounded by the city of Michigan City.

According to the 2010 census, Pottawattamie Park has a total area of 0.25 square miles (0.65 km^{2}), all land.

A significant portion of the town consists of the Friendship Botanic Gardens, which comprises 0.16 square miles of the town's total area.

== Demographics ==
Historical population
Census	Pop.	Note	%±
1960	292		—
1970	374		28.1%
1980	284		−24.1%
1990	281		−1.1%
2000	300		6.8%
2010	235		−21.7%
2020	242		3.0%
U.S. Decennial Census

=== 2010 census ===
As of the census of 2010, there were 235 people, 102 households, and 68 families living in the town. The population density was 940.0 inhabitants per square mile (362.9/km^{2}). There were 111 housing units at an average density of 444.0 per square mile (171.4/km^{2}). The racial makeup of the town was 92.3% White, 7.2% African American, and 0.4% from two or more races. Hispanic or Latino of any race were 0.4% of the population.

There were 102 households, of which 21.6% had children under the age of 18 living with them, 61.8% were married couples living together, 3.9% had a female householder with no husband present, 1.0% had a male householder with no wife present, and 33.3% were non-families. 29.4% of all households were made up of individuals, and 14.7% had someone living alone who was 65 years of age or older. The average household size was 2.23 and the average family size was 2.76.

The median age in the town was 53.1 years. 18.7% of residents were under the age of 18; 3% were between the ages of 18 and 24; 20.8% were from 25 to 44; 32.4% were from 45 to 64; and 25.1% were 65 years of age or older. The gender makeup of the town was 47.7% male and 52.3% female.

=== 2000 census ===
As of the census of 2000, there were 300 people, 121 households, and 86 families living in the town. The population density was 1,196.9 inhabitants per square mile (462.1/km^{2}). There were 127 housing units at an average density of 506.7 per square mile (195.6/km^{2}). The racial makeup of the town was 80.00% White, 16.33% African American, 0.67% Asian, 1.33% from other races, and 1.67% from two or more races. Hispanic or Latino of any race were 1.67% of the population.

There were 121 households, out of which 26.4% had children under the age of 18 living with them, 62.0% were married couples living together, 8.3% had a female householder with no husband present, and 28.1% were non-families. 25.6% of all households were made up of individuals, and 15.7% had someone living alone who was 65 years of age or older. The average household size was 2.37 and the average family size was 2.84.

In the town, the population was spread out, with 21.7% under the age of 18, 5.0% from 18 to 24, 22.3% from 25 to 44, 28.7% from 45 to 64, and 22.3% who were 65 years of age or older. The median age was 46 years. For every 100 females, there were 92.3 males. For every 100 females age 18 and over, there were 89.5 males.

The median income for a household in the town was $37,500, and the median income for a family was $46,750. Males had a median income of $63,750 versus $22,292 for females. The per capita income for the town was $24,383. About 3.4% of families and 8.6% of the population were below the poverty line, including 2.9% of those under the age of eighteen and 4.5% of those 65 or over.

== Education ==
Michigan City Area Schools is the school district covering the municipality. For this municipality, the zoned elementary school is Lake Hills Elementary School. The zoned middle school is Krueger Middle School, and Michigan City High School is the district's sole comprehensive high school.

== See also ==
- List of cities surrounded by another city
