= Bonge's Tavern =

Restaurant in Perkinsville, Indiana, USA

- Interactive map of Bonge's Tavern
- Location within Indiana Location within the United States

Restaurant information
- Established: 1934
- Owner: Jake Burgess
- Location: 9830 West 280 North, Perkinsville, Madison, Indiana, 46011, United States
- Coordinates: 40.143926°N 85.859288°W
- Website: https://www.bongestavern.com/

Bonge's Tavern is a New American cuisine and Haute cuisine restaurant in Perkinsville, Indiana, United States, opened originally in 1934. The restaurant, located in rural Indiana, features a rotating menu written on a chalkboard over the bar. It is known for its tailgating, a practice that continues under its current owner. It is located north of Noblesville and west of Anderson. It is about forty miles northeast of Indianapolis.

The restaurant has consistently featured the Perkinsville Pork on its menu across several owners. The location, in a barn-like building, has about 12 tables, including a side room for large parties. It also has a basement, accessible by a hatch door.

== History ==
The building housing the facility, now a restaurant and bar, was built sometime between 1835 and 1847 as a store. The establishment was initially opened as a tavern by Charles "Chuck" Bonge. Bonge bought and opened the location under his name in 1944. Bonge was the owner and operator of the tavern for 42 years. The original bar came from an old Elwood hotel, having been a part of the location since 1939. News spread of the location via t-shirts, word of mouth, and bumper stickers. Chuck Bonge told a local paper he never intended to sell it, and he died while still owning it in the early 1990s.

The building then sat empty for a few years until it was acquired by Don Kroger. The location is adorned with Indiana college banners and uses materials sourced from across the state. Kroger changed the location from primarily a tavern to a restaurant in the 1990s. In mid 2000, a fire started by a lightning storm burned down large portions of the restaurant. Volunteer firefighters from Indiana towns Lapel, Frankton, and Pipe Creek responded to the fire. Co-owner and chef Tony Huelster reopened the facility in December of that year.

Until the COVID-19 pandemic, guests would tailgate to get a spot in the restaurant. With the pandemic, the restaurant shifted to reservations, though tailgating is still permitted and encouraged.

The restaurant was purchased in 2023 from Huelster, who had owned it since 1999, by Jake Burgess. Food is prepared by a team of chefs led by executive chef Dean Sample, a locally famous chef from rural Indiana. His cooking has been described as infusing a Southern style. Sample previously won golden tickets to the 2024 World Food Championship. He has also won an award in 2016 and 2022 from the Indiana Pork Association. Sample was brought to the restaurant in 2023 by Jake Burgess, having previously served as executive chef at FoxGardin, another establishment owned by Burgess in Fortville, Indiana.
