= Cicero Township, Indiana =

Cicero Township
- Township
- Location in Tipton County
- Coordinates: 40°16′34″N 86°02′47″W
- Country: United States
- State: Indiana
- County: Tipton

Government
  - Type: Indiana township

Area
  - Total: 67.5 sq mi (175 km^{2})
  - Land: 67.5 sq mi (175 km^{2})
  - Water: 0 sq mi (0 km^{2}) 0%
- Elevation: 863 ft (263 m)

Population (2020)
  - Total: 8,017
  - Density: 119/sq mi (45.9/km^{2})
- Time zone: UTC-5 (Eastern (EST))
  - Summer (DST): UTC-4 (EDT)
- ZIP codes: 46031, 46072, 46076
- Area code: 765
- GNIS feature ID: 0453200

Cicero Township is one of six townships in Tipton County, Indiana, United States. As of the 2020 census, its population was 8,017 (down from 8,086 at 2010) It is the largest of the six townships in the county, and it contained 3,616 housing units.

== History ==
The Miami people were the first occupiers of Cicero Township. Upon early white settlement, the Miami resided on reservation land in what was then known as Hamilton County. On January 15, 1844, that reservation land became a part of Tipton County. The Miami were forced to leave the county, resulting in the Potawatomi Trail of Death. The majority of white settles in Cicero Township were from Southern Indiana, Ohio and Kentucky. Squatters were abundant in the area prior to land being available to purchase, which began in 1838. Settlement was sporadic in Cicero Township due to land that was "flat and low and would be difficult to drain," according to white settlers.

== Geography ==
According to the 2010 census, the township has a total area of 67.5 square miles (175 km^{2}), all land.

=== Natural landscape ===
Reports from the early 20th century state that despite being very flat and hard to drain, Cicero Township had lands with the finest agricultural potential "in the state." Historically, the area had plentiful oak, walnut, beech and ash trees, but most of the trees were cut for lumber in the late 19th century. Deer, squirrels, wild turkey, raccoons, mink, possum, and muskrats were plentiful during this time, too. Black bears were common near Cicero Creek. Gray wolves, cougars, and wild boars were hunted almost to extinction in the township's forests.

=== Cities and towns ===
- Tipton

=== Unincorporated towns ===
- Jackson at 40.3292044°N 86.0610993°W

=== Former settlements ===
- West Kinderhook
- Parrotsville

=== Adjacent townships ===
- Liberty Township (north)
- Wildcat Township (northeast)
- Madison Township (east)
- White River Township, Hamilton County (southeast)
- Jackson Township, Hamilton County (south)
- Jefferson Township (west)
- Prairie Township (northwest)

== Economy ==
=== 19th century ===
The first mill in the township was built by Samuel King. The mill handled both lumber and corn, using water from Cicero Creek for power. On a good day, King would process twelve bushels of corn. The second mill in the township was built by King and William Buffington. Also located on Cicero Creek, the mill was conveniently located at the Peru and Indianapolis Railroad Company stream crossing. The mill sawed timber and processed wheat and corn. Benjamin Bailey built a mill, which was horse powered, in 1850. Bailey allowed any farmer who wanted to grind their own corn to use the mill and horse. George Kane and Newton J. Jackson built a saw mill, which ran on steam, in 1851. The land where they built the steam saw mill is known as Jackson Station. Cicero Township's economy grew after the completion of the railroad to Peru, Indiana, which connected Peru to the Wabash and Erie Canal, in 1854. Another steam mill was built, by Thompson Innis, in 1854 at Parker's Mill (also called Parker's Corner).

== Education ==
=== Early history ===
The first school was founded in West Kinderhook by Silas Blount in 1842. Early schools in the township were paid with private funds and teachers were paid based on student subscription. By 1914, public schools were operating in the township.

=== Today ===
Students who reside in Cicero Township attend schools that are a part of the Tipton Community School Corporation.

== Government ==
=== Political districts ===
- Indiana's 5th congressional district
- State House District 38
- State Senate District 21

== Infrastructure ==
=== Transportation ===
In 1844, Cicero Township was split into three transportation districts, each two miles wide. The initial roads were of poor quality and mainly corduroy roads. The roads suffered considerable damage during wet seasons and were prone to seeking given the damp and low geography of the township. By 1914, railroads served the township and roads were made of gravel and macadam.

==== Major highways ====
- Indiana State Road 28

=== Airports and landing strips ===
- Tragesser Airport

=== Cemeteries ===
The township contains these eight cemeteries: Bethsaida, Fairview, Goar, Goodykoontz, Mauldentown, Sandbank, Stewart and Sumner.
