= Cicero Township =

Cicero Township may refer to the following townships in the United States:

- Cicero Township, Illinois
- Cicero Township, Indiana
