= Frankton, Indiana =

- Town
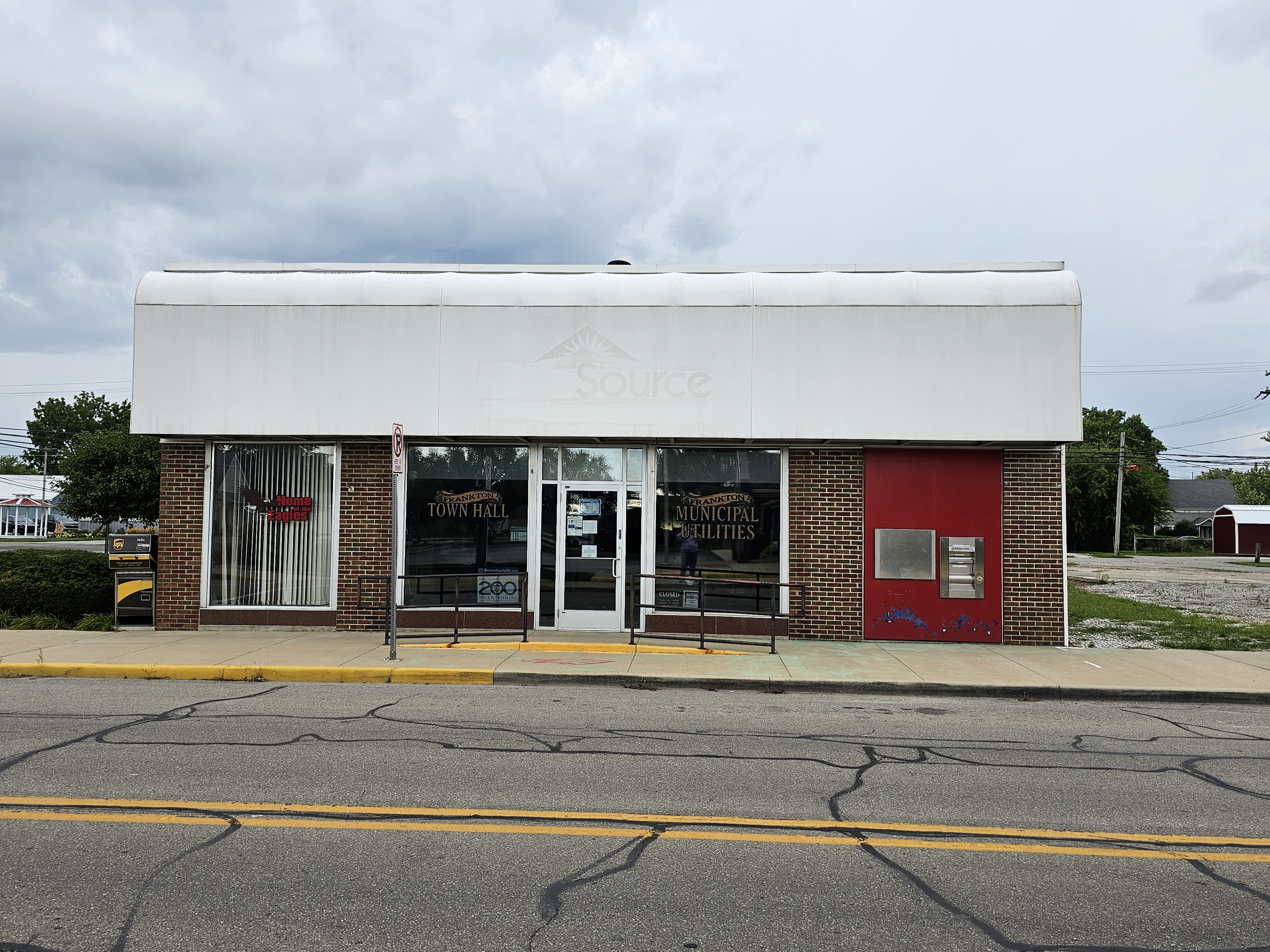
- Frankton Indiana Town Hall

- Seal

- Location in Madison County, Indiana
- Coordinates: 40°13′16″N 85°46′19″W
- Country: United States
- State: Indiana
- County: Madison
- Townships: Pipe Creek, Lafayette

Area
  - Total: 1.06 sq mi (2.74 km^{2})
  - Land: 1.06 sq mi (2.74 km^{2})
  - Water: 0 sq mi (0.00 km^{2})
- Elevation: 856 ft (261 m)

Population (2020)
  - Total: 1,775
  - Estimate (2025): 1,810 ▲
  - Density: 1,677.1/sq mi (647.55/km^{2})
- Time zone: UTC-5 (EST)
  - Summer (DST): UTC-5 (EST)
- ZIP code: 46044
- Area code: 765
- FIPS code: 18-25702
- GNIS feature ID: 2396949
- Website: townoffrankton.in.gov

Frankton is a town in Pipe Creek and Lafayette townships, Madison County, Indiana, United States. It is part of the Indianapolis–Carmel–Anderson metropolitan statistical area. The population was 1,775 at the 2020 census.

== History ==
Frankton was laid out in 1853. It was incorporated as a town in 1871.

== Geography ==
Frankton is located in northern Madison County. Indiana State Road 128 passes through the center of town, leading east 6 miles (10 km) to Indiana State Road 9 and west 4 miles (6 km) to State Road 13. Anderson, the county seat, is 12 miles (19 km) to the southeast, Elwood is 7 miles (11 km) to the northwest, and Alexandria is 8 miles (13 km) to the northeast.

According to the U.S. Census Bureau, Frankton has a total area of 1.06 square miles (2.75 km^{2}), all of it recorded as land. Pipe Creek crosses the northern part of the town, flowing southwest toward the White River at Perkinsville.

== Demographics ==
Historical population
Census	Pop.	Note	%±
1870	270		—
1880	391		44.8%
1890	520		33.0%
1900	1,464		181.5%
1910	936		−36.1%
1920	739		−21.0%
1930	829		12.2%
1940	824		−0.6%
1950	1,047		27.1%
1960	1,445		38.0%
1970	1,796		24.3%
1980	2,080		15.8%
1990	1,736		−16.5%
2000	1,905		9.7%
2010	1,862		−2.3%
2020	1,775		−4.7%
2025 (est.)	1,810	▲	2.0%
U.S. Decennial Census

=== 2020 census ===
As of the 2020 census, Frankton had a population of 1,775. The median age was 40.5 years. 24.8% of residents were under the age of 18 and 17.1% of residents were 65 years of age or older. For every 100 females there were 98.1 males, and for every 100 females age 18 and over there were 92.4 males age 18 and over.

0.0% of residents lived in urban areas, while 100.0% lived in rural areas.

There were 719 households in Frankton, of which 34.8% had children under the age of 18 living in them. Of all households, 45.2% were married-couple households, 18.4% were households with a male householder and no spouse or partner present, and 27.7% were households with a female householder and no spouse or partner present. About 26.4% of all households were made up of individuals and 11.7% had someone living alone who was 65 years of age or older.

There were 803 housing units, of which 10.5% were vacant. The homeowner vacancy rate was 1.6% and the rental vacancy rate was 10.1%.

Racial composition as of the 2020 census
Race	Number	Percent
White	1,659	93.5%
Black or African American	5	0.3%
American Indian and Alaska Native	0	0.0%
Asian	6	0.3%
Native Hawaiian and Other Pacific Islander	0	0.0%
Some other race	17	1.0%
Two or more races	88	5.0%
Hispanic or Latino (of any race)	40	2.3%

=== 2010 census ===
As of the census of 2010, there were 1,862 people, 732 households, and 531 families living in the town. The population density was 1,773.3 inhabitants per square mile (684.7/km^{2}). There were 808 housing units at an average density of 769.5 per square mile (297.1/km^{2}). The racial makeup of the town was 97.5% White, 0.4% African American, 0.1% Native American, 0.1% Asian, 0.9% from other races, and 1.1% from two or more races. Hispanic or Latino of any race were 2.2% of the population.

There were 732 households, of which 35.9% had children under the age of 18 living with them; 52.9% were married couples living together; 14.6% had a female householder with no husband present; 5.1% had a male householder with no wife present; and 27.5% were non-families. 24.2% of all households were made up of individuals, and 10.2% had someone living alone who was 65 years of age or older. The average household size was 2.54 and the average family size was 3.00.

The median age in the town was 38.2 years. 26.9% of residents were under the age of 18; 7% were between the ages of 18 and 24; 25.3% were from 25 to 44; 26.5% were from 45 to 64; and 14.3% were 65 years of age or older. The gender makeup of the town was 48.7% male and 51.3% female.

=== 2000 census ===
As of the census of 2000, there were 1,905 people, 752 households, and 560 families living in the town. The population density was 1,888.0 inhabitants per square mile (729.0/km^{2}). There were 782 housing units at an average density of 775.0 per square mile (299.2/km^{2}). The racial makeup of the town was 97.85% White, 0.05% African American, 0.10% Native American, 0.31% Asian, 1.21% from other races, and 0.47% from two or more races. Hispanic or Latino of any race were 1.63% of the population.

There were 752 households, out of which 34.8% had children under the age of 18 living with them, 59.0% were married couples living together, 10.9% had a female householder with no husband present, and 25.4% were non-families. 22.2% of all households were made up of individuals, and 9.2% had someone living alone who was 65 years of age or older. The average household size was 2.53 and the average family size was 2.94.

In the town, the population was spread out, with 26.6% under the age of 18, 8.9% from 18 to 24, 28.6% from 25 to 44, 21.9% from 45 to 64, and 14.0% who were 65 years of age or older. The median age was 35 years. For every 100 females, there were 93.8 males. For every 100 females age 18 and over, there were 91.0 males.

The median income for a household in the town was $39,130, and the median income for a family was $44,474. Males had a median income of $35,750 versus $22,179 for females. The per capita income for the town was $17,232. About 6.5% of families and 8.1% of the population were below the poverty line, including 10.5% of those under age 18 and 4.4% of those age 65 or over.

== Education ==
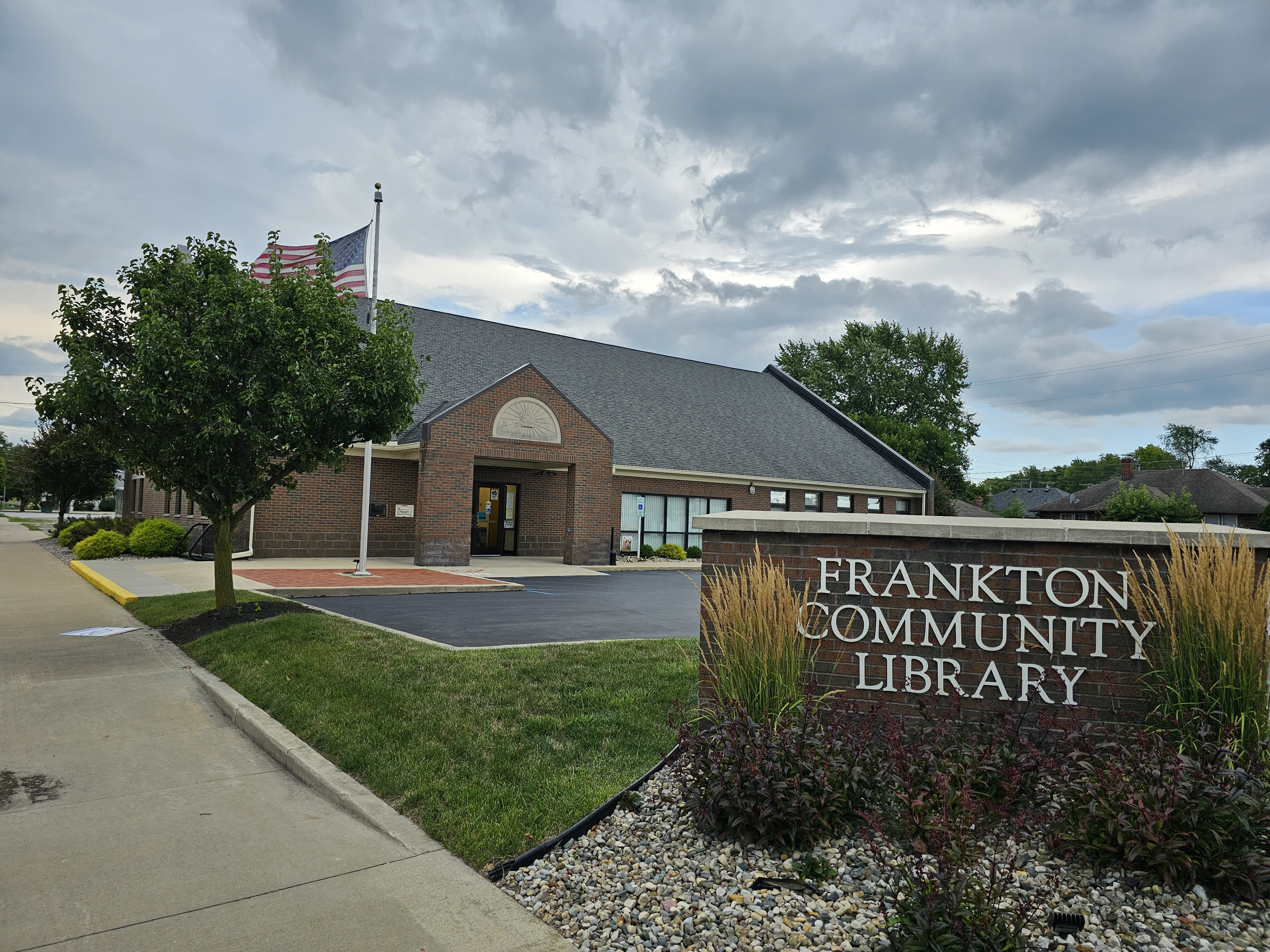
Frankton Community Library

It is in the Frankton-Lapel Community Schools school district.

Frankton has a public library, a branch of the North Madison County Public Library System.

== Arts and culture ==
The annual Heritage Days Festival, held each year in the fall since 1975, is one way in which the town tries to promote a sense of community. The festival includes a car show, arts, crafts, games, live entertainment and more. The Heritage Days Festival was the recipient of the Best Small Festival Award for 2013.

== Notable people ==
- Albert Henry Vestal, Republican, U.S. House of Representatives and House Majority Whip 1921 to 1937, was born and raised in Frankton.
- Isabel Withers (1896–1968), stage, motion picture, and television actress, born in Frankton.
