= Parrotsville, Indiana =

Coordinates: 40°19′31″N 86°03′34″W

- Former settlement
- Interactive map of Parrotsville, Indiana
- Country: United States
- State: Indiana

Parrotsville is a former settlement in Tipton County and Hamilton County in Indiana in the United States.

== History ==
Parrotsville was surveyed by Edward M. Sharp on September 29, 1853. It was platted a few days later on October 5. Parrotsville was about a 1/2 mile south of Jackson Station, Indiana. Benjaman F. Goar handled sales of the Parrotsville land.
