= New Lancaster =

New Lancaster may refer to:

- New Lancaster, Indiana
- New Lancaster, Kansas
