= Lafayette Township, Indiana =

Lafayette Township is the name of four townships in the U.S. state of Indiana:

- Lafayette Township, Allen County, Indiana
- Lafayette Township, Floyd County, Indiana
- Lafayette Township, Madison County, Indiana
- Lafayette Township, Owen County, Indiana
