= West Elwood, Indiana =

- Unincorporated community
- Location within Indiana Location within the United States
- Coordinates: 40°16′47″N 85°51′38″W
- Country: United States
- State: Indiana
- County: Tipton
- Township: Madison
- Elevation: 863 ft (263 m)
- Time zone: UTC-5 (Eastern (EST))
  - Summer (DST): UTC-4 (EDT)
- ZIP code: 46036
- Area code: 765
- GNIS feature ID: 445737

West Elwood is an unincorporated community in Madison Township, Tipton County, in the U.S. state of Indiana.

== Geography ==
West Elwood is bordered to the east by the city of Elwood in Madison County.
