= Curtisville =

Curtisville may refer to the following places in the United States of America:

- Curtisville, Indiana
- Curtisville, Michigan
- Curtisville, Pennsylvania
- Old Curtisville Historic District, part of Stockbridge, Massachusetts
