= Jefferson Township, Tipton County, Indiana =

Jefferson Township
- Township
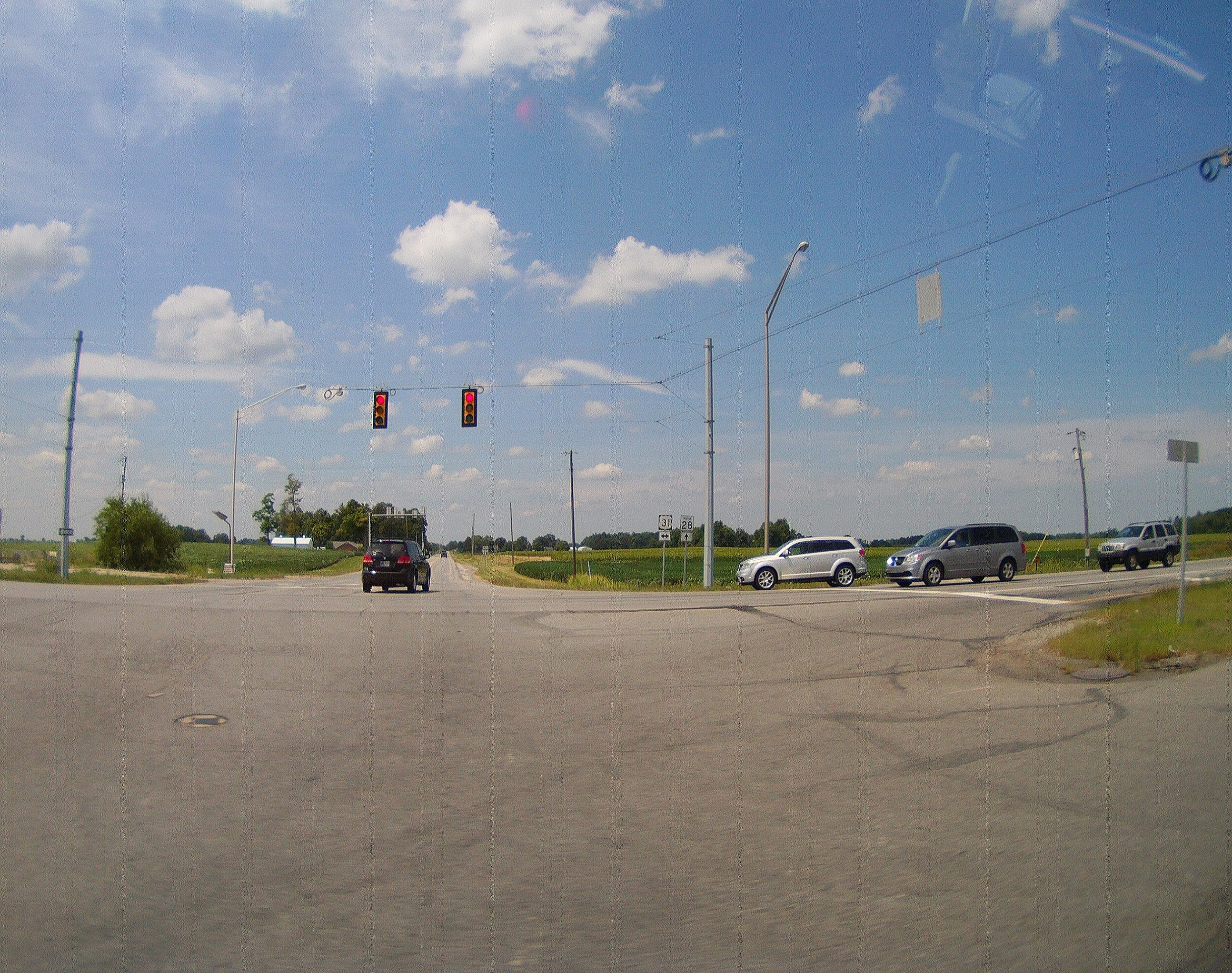
- Intersection of U.S. 31 and Highway 28, in Jefferson Township

- Location in Tipton County
- Coordinates: 40°15′35″N 86°11′29″W
- Country: United States
- State: Indiana
- County: Tipton

Government
  - Type: Indiana township

Area
  - Total: 39.1 sq mi (101 km^{2})
  - Land: 39.1 sq mi (101 km^{2})
  - Water: 0 sq mi (0 km^{2}) 0%
- Elevation: 922 ft (281 m)

Population (2020)
  - Total: 1,403
  - Density: 35.9/sq mi (13.9/km^{2})
- Time zone: UTC-5 (Eastern (EST))
  - Summer (DST): UTC-4 (EDT)
- ZIP codes: 46031, 46045, 46049, 46050, 46072
- Area code: 765
- GNIS feature ID: 453500

Jefferson Township is one of six townships in Tipton County, Indiana, United States. As of the 2020 census, its population was 1,403 (down from 1,422 at 2010) and it contained 590 housing units.

== History ==
Squatters were the first white settlers in the area. Barnett Stepp was the first known white settler in Jefferson Township. He moved with his family, from Kentucky, to the southern part of the future township in 1835. Stepp maintained a small home and farm until his death in 1852. A son-in-law of Stepp, named Horton, came to the township in 1836, settling on 160 acres just east of Stepp's land. Over the course of the decade, more families settled in the area. The first blacksmith shop was founded in the area in the late 1830s by Robert Smith, near Tetersburg. Miami Indians still resided in the area as of 1840. The area was very rural and early settlers struggled to acquire clothing and groceries. Farmers traded crops and animal skins for items they needed. People had to travel from Jefferson Township to Cicero, Indiana, which was 16 miles away and treacherous given the poor quality of roads. Wheat began to be grown in the area and was a popular commodity to trade in Cicero.

In 1837, the first orchard was planted in the township. The following year, the first log cabin was built in the area, followed by the first frame house ten years later, in 1848. The first brick building was built in 1868. In 1845, the first mill was built near Normanda. Additional mills were built in the area and a tannery was built in 1849, only to close in 1856. The first cemetery was founded in Tetersburg in 1847.

The first township elections were held in 1844. A Protestant Methodist congregation was founded in the township in 1863. A church was built in 1873 just north of Kempton.

As of the early 20th century, farming was the main industry, specifically fruit. The Lake Erie & Western railroad ran east to west through the township providing economic support, transportation and communication.

== Geography ==
According to the 2010 census, the township has a total area of 39.1 square miles (101 km^{2}), all land.

=== Natural environments ===
Historically, Jefferson Township was fairly flat with a lot of low, marshy ground. The west side of the township was prairie with some small amounts of trees and shrubs, including willow and scrub oak. In the southern part, the soil was light in color and sandy in lower areas. In some areas the soil is thick and black and good for agricultural purposes.

=== Cities, towns, villages ===
- Kempton

=== Unincorporated towns ===
- East Union at 40.2172593°N 86.1283233°W
- Ekin at 40.2169814°N 86.1616581°W
- Goldsmith at 40.2894816°N 86.1491581°W
- Normanda at 40.3025372°N 86.1647143°W
- Tetersburg at 40.2753149°N 86.1511025°W

(This list is based on USGS data and may include former settlements.)

=== Failed settlements ===
- Jericho: the failed plan for a village in Jefferson Township. The community was intended to be located in the southern part of Jefferson Township, just north of Ekin. It was founded by Jerry Dunn and Caswell Boxley. It was platted but lots were never purchased and the village never came into fruition before being abandoned.

=== Adjacent townships ===
- Prairie Township (north)
- Cicero Township (east)
- Jackson Township, Hamilton County (southeast)
- Adams Township, Hamilton County (south)
- Johnson Township, Clinton County (west)
- Sugar Creek Township, Clinton County (west)

== Government ==
=== Political districts ===
- Indiana's 5th congressional district
- State House District 32
- State Senate District 21

== Early history ==
The first school in the township began in 1842, just south of Goldsmith. The first teacher, James Forsythe, was described as being a "good instructor," and having a criminal past. He was arrested in Hamilton County for larceny at one point during his life. After he left, his son, Peter, taught at the school. Two additional schools were built in the township around this time. The first was near Jericho and the second near Normanda. Eventually, another school was built in Tetersburg.

== Today ==
Students in Jefferson Township attend schools in the Tipton Community School Corporation.

== Infrastructure ==
=== Major highways ===
- U.S. Route 31
- State Road 28

=== Cemeteries ===
The township contains these four cemeteries: Kempton, Small, Tucker and Wolford.
