= West Kinderhook, Indiana =

- Former settlement
- Interactive map of West Kinderhook, Indiana
- Coordinates: 40.2182°N 85.9772°W
- Country: United States
- State: Indiana

West Kinderhook is a former settlement on the border between Tipton County and Hamilton County in Indiana, United States.

== History ==
West Kinderhook was surveyed and platted in 1841 by Silas Blount, M.D.. The village was located in both Tipton and Hamilton Counties. A few plots of land were sold; however, growth was short-lived and stopped suddenly. A railroad station at Buena Vista was built 2 1/2 miles west of West Kinderhook, which led to West Kinderhook's demise.
