= Linwood, Indiana =

- Unincorporated community
- Location within Indiana Location within the United States
- Coordinates: 40°11′37″N 85°40′54″W
- Country: United States
- State: Indiana
- County: Madison
- Township: Lafayette
- Elevation: 892 ft (272 m)
- ZIP code: 46001
- FIPS code: 18-44226
- GNIS feature ID: 437972

Linwood is an unincorporated community in Lafayette Township, Madison County, Indiana.

Linwood was likely named for the presence of linden trees. It was originally called Funk's Station.
