= Ekin, Indiana =

- Unincorporated community
- Location within Indiana Location within the United States
- Coordinates: 40°13′01″N 86°09′42″W
- Country: United States
- State: Indiana
- County: Hamilton, Tipton
- Townships: Adams, Jefferson
- Elevation: 906 ft (276 m)
- Time zone: UTC-5 (Eastern (EST))
  - Summer (DST): UTC-4 (EDT)
- ZIP code: 46045
- Area code: 765
- GNIS feature ID: 434057

Ekin is an unincorporated community in Hamilton and Tipton counties, in the U.S. state of Indiana.

== History ==
Ekin was named for General Ekin by James McKee. McKee built the first frame house in Ekin, which was used as a store. McKee sold his property and moved away after five years. Ekin heard about the naming of the town and send McKee a bible as a gift. Historically, Ekin had a strong timber industry. Ekin timber was exported internationally. A post office was established at Ekin in 1875, and remained in operation until it was discontinued in 1902.

== Geography ==
Ekin is located in the southern part of Jefferson Township, on the county line of Tipton and Hamilton counties.
