= Kempton, Indiana =

- Town
- Location of Kempton in Tipton County, Indiana.
- Coordinates: 40°17′16″N 86°13′47″W
- Country: United States
- State: Indiana
- County: Tipton
- Township: Jefferson
- Established: 1875

Area
  - Total: 0.16 sq mi (0.42 km^{2})
  - Land: 0.16 sq mi (0.42 km^{2})
  - Water: 0 sq mi (0.00 km^{2})
- Elevation: 929 ft (283 m)

Population (2020)
  - Total: 288
  - Density: 1,781.9/sq mi (688.01/km^{2})
- Time zone: UTC-5 (EST)
  - Summer (DST): UTC-5 (EST)
- ZIP code: 46049
- Area code: 765
- FIPS code: 18-39366
- GNIS feature ID: 2397013

Kempton is a town in Jefferson Township, Tipton County, in the U.S. state of Indiana. As of the 2020 census, Kempton had a population of 288. It is part of the Kokomo, Indiana Metropolitan Statistical Area.

== History ==
Kempton was founded in 1875, upon the completion of the Lake Erie and Western Railroad, in the same year. The land was originally owned by David Kemp, the namesake of the town. The first house in Kempton was built by Henry Hays. Hays also operated a grocery out of the building. That year, there was also a post office, an additional store, a blacksmith, and a mill. A Methodist Episcopal Church was built in 1902. As of 1914, the town had a population of about 700 people and had a bank, newspaper, and three churches. Tilemaking was the most lucrative industry, with the Kempton Tile Factory being located in the town. A canning factory and milling company were also located in Kempton.

The Kempton post office has been in operation since 1876.

== Geography ==
Kempton is located in the western part of Jefferson Township.

According to the 2010 census, Kempton has a total area of 0.16 square miles (0.41 km^{2}), all land.

== Demographics ==
Historical population
Census	Pop.	Note	%±
1880	206		—
1910	600		—
1920	498		−17.0%
1930	469		−5.8%
1940	403		−14.1%
1950	438		8.7%
1960	480		9.6%
1970	469		−2.3%
1980	410		−12.6%
1990	362		−11.7%
2000	380		5.0%
2010	335		−11.8%
2020	288		−14.0%
U.S. Decennial Census

=== 2010 census ===
As of the census of 2010, there were 335 people, 129 households, and 93 families residing in the town. The population density was 1,970.6 inhabitants per square mile (760.9/km^{2}). There were 154 housing units at an average density of 905.9 per square mile (349.8/km^{2}). The racial makeup of the town was 98.8% White, 0.3% Asian, and 0.9% from two or more races. Hispanic or Latino of any race were 0.9% of the population.

There were 129 households, of which 34.1% had children under the age of 18 living with them, 58.1% were married couples living together, 8.5% had a female householder with no husband present, 5.4% had a male householder with no wife present, and 27.9% were non-families. 23.3% of all households were made up of individuals, and 12.4% had someone living alone who was 65 years of age or older. The average household size was 2.60 and the average family size was 2.99.

The median age in the town was 39.1 years. 23.6% of residents were under the age of 18; 6.4% were between the ages of 18 and 24; 30.3% were from 25 to 44; 23.4% were from 45 to 64; and 16.7% were 65 years of age or older. The gender makeup of the town was 53.1% male and 46.9% female.

=== 2000 census ===
As of the census of 2000, there were 380 people, 139 households, and 108 families residing in the town. The population density was 2,335.8 inhabitants per square mile (901.9/km^{2}). There were 152 housing units at an average density of 934.3 per square mile (360.7/km^{2}). The racial makeup of the town was 97.63% White, 0.26% Native American, 0.26% from other races, and 1.84% from two or more races. Hispanic or Latino of any race were 1.32% of the population.

There were 139 households, out of which 32.4% had children under the age of 18 living with them, 64.0% were married couples living together, 9.4% had a female householder with no husband present, and 22.3% were non-families. 20.1% of all households were made up of individuals, and 6.5% had someone living alone who was 65 years of age or older. The average household size was 2.73 and the average family size was 3.13.

In the town, the population was spread out, with 27.6% under the age of 18, 7.1% from 18 to 24, 26.1% from 25 to 44, 28.9% from 45 to 64, and 10.3% who were 65 years of age or older. The median age was 37 years. For every 100 females, there were 108.8 males. For every 100 females age 18 and over, there were 103.7 males.

The median income for a household in the town was $40,625, and the median income for a family was $44,286. Males had a median income of $31,667 versus $20,417 for females. The per capita income for the town was $15,620. About 5.2% of families and 4.5% of the population were below the poverty line, including 0.9% of those under age 18 and 11.3% of those age 65 or over.
