= Hobbs, Indiana =

- Unincorporated community and Census-designated place
- Location within Indiana Location within the United States
- Coordinates: 40°17′06″N 85°57′10″W
- Country: United States
- State: Indiana
- County: Tipton
- Township: Madison
- Founded: 1878
- Named for: Henderson Hobbs

Area
  - Total: 0.83 sq mi (2.14 km^{2})
  - Land: 0.83 sq mi (2.14 km^{2})
  - Water: 0 sq mi (0.00 km^{2})
- Elevation: 866 ft (264 m)
- Time zone: UTC-5 (Eastern (EST))
  - Summer (DST): UTC-4 (EDT)
- ZIP code: 46047
- Area code: 765
- FIPS code: 18-34168
- GNIS feature ID: 2830558

Hobbs is an unincorporated community in Madison Township, Tipton County, in the U.S. state of Indiana.

It is part of the Kokomo, Indiana, Metropolitan Statistical Area.

== History ==
Hobbs was founded in 1878 by Henderson Hobbs. He built his farm just next to the Lake Erie & Western Railroad that ran through the area. A Christian church was founded in 1884. They converted an old school house turned blacksmith shop into a church in 1896. A new building was constructed in 1911. A Methodist Episcopal Church was founded in the community in 1909 after separating from the church in Windfall. As of 1914, Hobbs had a population of 200. During that time, mills for flour and wood were the primary economic drivers.

The post office at Hobbs has been in operation since 1876.

== Geography ==
As of 2024, Hobbs had a total land area of 0.826 square miles (2.14 km^{2}), all land.

== Demographics ==
The United States Census Bureau delineated Hobbs as a census designated place in the 2022 American Community Survey.
