= Ray Still =

American oboist (1920–2014)

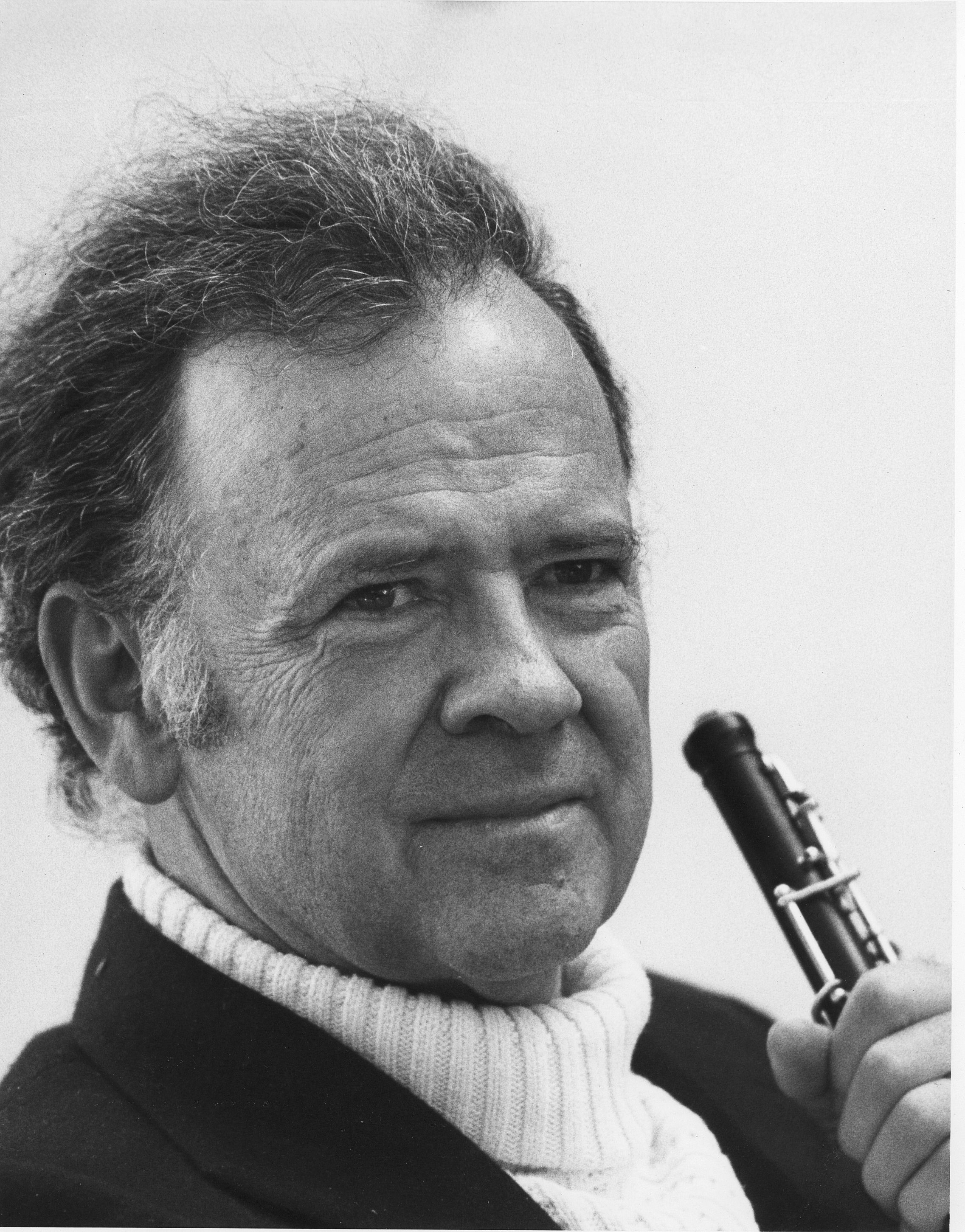
- Photo of Ray Still in the 1980s

Background information
- Born: March 12, 1920; Elwood, Indiana
- Died: March 12, 2014 (aged 94) Woodstock, Vermont
- Instrument: Oboe

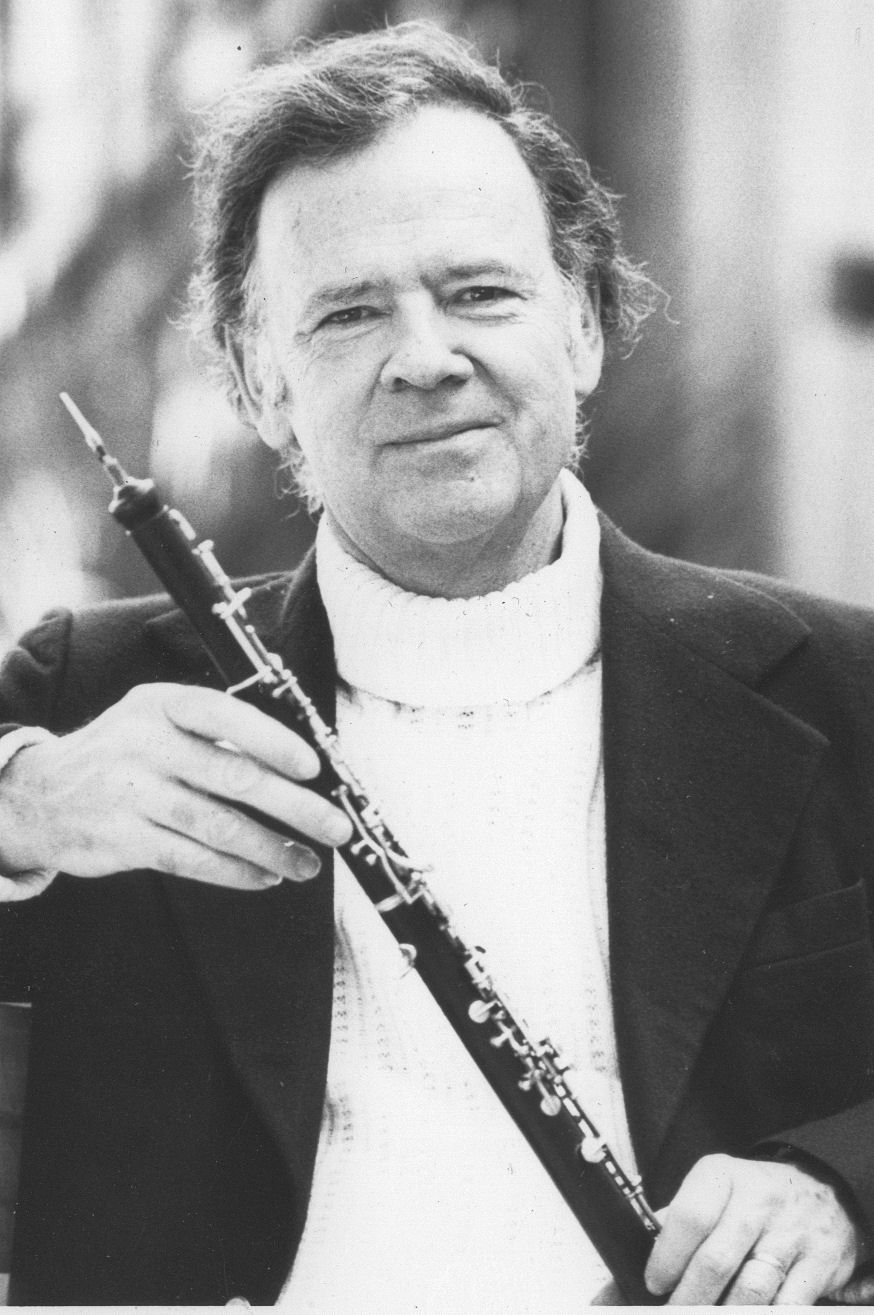
Photo of Ray Still in the 1980s.

Ray Still (March 12, 1920 – March 12, 2014) was an American classical oboist. He was the principal oboe of the Chicago Symphony Orchestra for 40 years, from 1953 to 1993.

== Early life ==
Still was born March 12, 1920, in Elwood, Indiana, and moved to Los Angeles as a teenager. He started studying the clarinet at 14, and volunteered as an usher at Los Angeles Philharmonic concerts, where he heard the Belgian oboist Henri de Busscher, whose "singing" style inspired him to switch to the oboe at 16. His first oboe teacher was Philip Memoli, who played second oboe to de Busscher in the Los Angeles Philharmonic. From 1941 to 1943, Still was a member of the US Army Signal Corps Reserves and studied electrical engineering at Pacific States University. He was in the US Army from 1943 to 1946, and worked mainly in radar. Still enrolled in the Juilliard School of Music in New York in the summer of 1946 and attended for almost two years. He studied oboe at first with Bruno Labate, and later with Robert Bloom, the principal oboist for Arturo Toscanini's NBC Symphony, even though Bloom did not teach at Juilliard.

== Performing career ==
Still's style of oboe playing had elements of both the more relaxed European style and the more controlled American style, with the singing tone he admired in de Busscher, Labate, and Bloom. For example, one of his students, Michael Rosenberg, has played in German orchestras, where the American style is not popular. The American style came primarily from Marcel Tabuteau, who had taught Robert Bloom at the Curtis Institute; Still said that up to the early 1970s, he was the only principal oboist in a major US orchestra who had not studied with Tabuteau. He was most flattered when reviewers compared him to great singers, as a reviewer in London did when he played oboe concerti with the Academy of London in 1985, or to great jazz musicians, as a reviewer did in a review of his recording of the Bach Wedding Cantata.

His oboe positions with professional orchestras were:

- Second oboe with the Kansas City Philharmonic, 1939–1941.
- Principal oboe in the Buffalo Philharmonic under William Steinberg, 1947–1949.
- Principal oboe with the Baltimore Symphony under Reginald Stewart and Massimo Freccia, 1949–1953.
- In 1953 he was hired by Fritz Reiner, the recently appointed music director of the Chicago Symphony Orchestra. The position was assistant first oboe, but he moved up to principal oboe in 1954. He stayed in that position until 1993, later playing under music directors Jean Martinon from 1963 to 1968, Georg Solti from 1969 to 1991, and Daniel Barenboim from 1991 to 1993.
  - The only gap in 40 years with the Chicago Symphony came when he was fired by Martinon in May 1967. Still fought the firing, the case went to arbitration, and he was rehired seven months later.

Still also had an extensive career performing and recording chamber music, including at the Aspen Music Festival in Colorado, the Marlboro Festival in Vermont, and the Stratford Shakespeare Festival in Ontario, Canada, which used to include a music festival. He performed and coached students at numerous other music festivals in Europe, Japan, China, Korea, and Mexico. His oboe teaching positions included:

- Peabody Institute in Baltimore, 1949–1953
- Roosevelt University in Chicago, 1954–1957
- Northwestern University in Evanston, Illinois; Professor of music, 1960–2003

Northwestern invited him to present a series of master classes in 2010 in honor of his 90th birthday, an event that was also observed the week of his birthday on the Chicago classical music radio station WFMT. WFMT played many of his recordings and a two-hour audio documentary about his career that week.

He had many private students as well. Many of his students went on to play in major orchestras and teach at major universities around the world. His former students include Sherie Aguirre, Stephen Caplan, Ricardo Castaneda, Mark Christianson, Peter Cooper, John Dee, Marc Gordon, Michael Henoch, Yoko Kojima, Humbert Lucarelli, Patrick McFarland, Jane Marvine, Robert Morgan, Nora Post, Christopher Raphael, Michael Rosenberg, Grover Schiltz, Mark Seerup, Ian Shafer, Robert Sheena, Carl Sonik, Linda Strommen, Rudy Vrbsky, and Keisuke Wakao.

== Retirement ==
Following his retirement from Northwestern in 2003, he moved to Annapolis, Maryland, with his beloved wife Mary and son James to live near family. He continued to give master classes and lessons there. Mary and James died in 2012. In 2013, he moved to Saxtons River and later Woodstock, Vermont, to live near family. He died in Woodstock, Vermont, on his 94th birthday (March 12, 2014), surrounded by family and listening to Bach's St. Matthew Passion.

== Selected discography ==
- Strauss Oboe Concerto, Bach Oboe d'amore Concerto BWV 1055, Marcello Oboe Concerto, and three Bach Sinfonias; Academy of London, conducted by Richard Stamp. Virgin Classics/Virgo.
- Mozart Oboe Concerto, K 314, Chicago Symphony Orchestra, Claudio Abbado, Deutsche Grammophon. Cadenzas by Thomas Still (his son).
- Bach "Double" Concerto for Violin & Oboe in D minor, BWV 1060R, with Itzhak Perlman and the Israel Philharmonic. Angel.
- Bach: Brandenburg Concerto No. 2, BWV 1047; Brandenburg Concerto No. 5, BWV 1050 (no oboe); Cantata No. 202 "Wedding Cantata" (latter with Kathleen Battle, soprano); Chicago Symphony Orchestra at the Ravinia Festival, James Levine, conductor, & harpsichord solo in No. 5. RCA.
- RAY STILL: A Chicago Legend. Baroque Oboe Sonatas by J. S. Bach, Handel, Telemann and Vivaldi. Ray Still, oboe; Leonard Sharrow (bassoon, in Handel, Telemann & Vivaldi); Robert Conant (harpsichord, in Telemann & Vivaldi); Thomas Still (harpsichord, in Bach). Nimbus.
- Mozart Serenade No. 11, K 375 for Wind Octet, and four of Grieg's Lyric Pieces arranged for wind octet. Chicago Symphony Winds (organized and led by Still), LP only, Sheffield Lab, recorded direct to disk, 1983.
- Mozart Quintet for Piano and Winds, K 452, with James Levine piano, Clark Brody clarinet, Dale Clevenger horn, and Willard Elliot bassoon. Music from Ravinia Vol. 3 (members of Chicago Symphony); LP only. (with Mozart Piano Quartet K. 478)
- Oboe quartets by Mozart, Wanhal, JC Bach, and Stamitz, with Itzhak Perlman violin, Pinchas Zukerman viola, and Lynn Harrell cello. LP only, EMI, 1981. The Mozart quartet recording has been on CD in some Perlman box sets.
- Mozart Oboe Quartet, K 370, with members of the Fine Arts Quartet. Concert Disc LP, 1958 (with Mozart horn quintet), and Boston Skyline CD, 1996 (with Mozart flute quartets).
- Poulenc Trio for piano, oboe, and bassoon and Schumann Romances, with Milan Turković, bassoon in the Poulenc, and John Perry, piano. Telefunken, LP only.
- Hindemith Sonata for oboe and piano. With viola and bassoon sonatas by Hindemith. John Perry, piano. Telefunken, LP only.

He played principal oboe on almost all of the recordings by the Chicago Symphony from 1954 to 1993, and he played principal oboe in the opera Samson and Delilah recorded with the NBC Symphony under Stokowski in the early 1950s, filling in for Robert Bloom.
