= Goldsmith, Indiana =

- Unincorporated community and Census-designated place
- Location within Indiana Location within the United States
- Coordinates: 40°17′27″N 86°09′02″W
- Country: United States
- State: Indiana
- County: Tipton
- Township: Jefferson
- Founded: 1876

Area
  - Total: 0.21 sq mi (0.54 km^{2})
  - Land: 0.21 sq mi (0.54 km^{2})
  - Water: 0 sq mi (0.00 km^{2})
- Elevation: 909 ft (277 m)
- Time zone: UTC-5 (Eastern (EST))
  - Summer (DST): UTC-4 (EDT)
- ZIP code: 46045
- Area code: 765
- FIPS code: 18-28296
- GNIS feature ID: 2830557

Goldsmith is an unincorporated community of Jefferson Township in Tipton County, Indiana, United States, about 40 miles (64 km) north of Indianapolis.

It is part of the Kokomo, Indiana Metropolitan Statistical Area.

== History ==
Originally called Green Station, Goldsmith was surveyed in 1876. The original landowners were John Wolford, J.A. Teter, McDonald Teter, and Hiram Fulkerson. The town's name was changed to Goldsmith after the founders discovered another town in Indiana named Green Station. It was named after a contractor who helped build the LaFayette, Muncie and Bloomington Railroad. The first home was built in the village, on the west side, by Solomon Wolford. There was also a blacksmith and a shop. A Methodist Episcopal Church was organized in Goldsmith in 1881. A church was built for the congregation, costing $1,000 to build.

A post office was established at Goldsmith in 1876, and remained in operation until it was discontinued in 2001.

As of 1914, the town was known for its high school, which was the most contemporary in the state at the time. The town used to be home to the "old settlers' meeting," in which thousands of early Indiana settlers would unite in Goldsmith to celebrate.

== Geography ==
Goldsmith is located six miles west of Tipton, Indiana.

As of 2024, Goldsmith had a total area of 0.21 square miles (0.54 km^{2}), all land.

== Demographics ==
Historical population
| Census | Pop. | Note | %± |
|---|---|---|---|
U.S. Decennial Census

As of January 1914, the village had a population of 200.

The United States Census Bureau delineated Goldsmith as a census designated place in the 2022 American Community Survey.

== Education ==
The first school in Jefferson Township was built in Goldsmith and began operation in 1842. James Forsythe was the first teacher.

== Notable people ==
- Beryl H. Potter (1900–1985), astronomical researcher, born in Goldsmith
