= Florida, Indiana =

- Unincorporated community
- Location within Indiana Location within the United States
- Coordinates: 40°09′37″N 85°42′37″W
- Country: United States
- State: Indiana
- County: Madison
- Township: Lafayette
- Elevation: 886 ft (270 m)
- ZIP code: 46011
- FIPS code: 18-23746
- GNIS feature ID: 434613

Florida is an unincorporated community in Lafayette Township, Madison County, Indiana.

== History ==
Florida was founded in 1856. It likely took its name from the state of Florida. A post office was established at Florida in 1864, and remained in operation until it was discontinued in 1903.

Florida was later known as Florida Station. This was based upon the train station located there in the building that was previously a post office and gas station. This small train station closed in 1956 and it was converted into the Florida Station Inn restaurant. This restaurant remained a popular local establishment until it closed in 1978.
