= Pipe Creek Township, Madison County, Indiana =

Pipe Creek Township
- Township
- Location in Madison County
- Coordinates: 40°14′40″N 85°48′02″W
- Country: United States
- State: Indiana
- County: Madison

Government
  - Type: Indiana township

Area
  - Total: 42.47 sq mi (110.0 km^{2})
  - Land: 42.41 sq mi (109.8 km^{2})
  - Water: 0.06 sq mi (0.16 km^{2}) 0.14%
- Elevation: 860 ft (262 m)

Population (2020)
  - Total: 12,125
  - Density: 294.6/sq mi (113.7/km^{2})
- ZIP codes: 46001, 46036, 46044
- GNIS feature ID: 0453741

Pipe Creek Township is one of fourteen townships in Madison County, Indiana, United States. As of the 2010 census, its population was 12,497 and it contained 5,828 housing units.

== History ==
Pipe Creek Township was organized in 1833, and named after Pipe Creek.

== Geography ==
According to the 2010 census, the township has a total area of 42.47 square miles (110.0 km^{2}), of which 42.41 square miles (109.8 km^{2}) (or 99.86%) is land and 0.06 square miles (0.16 km^{2}) (or 0.14%) is water.

=== Cities, towns, villages ===
- Elwood (vast majority)
- Frankton (north side)
- West Elwood

=== Unincorporated towns ===
- Dundee at 40.272262°N 85.756089°W
- South Elwood at 40.262539°N 85.842202°W

=== Cemeteries ===
The township contains these nine cemeteries: Carr, Elwood, Howard, Prewett, Saint Josephs, Shell, Sigler, Stoken and Sunset Memorial Park.

=== Major highways ===
- Indiana State Road 13
- Indiana State Road 28
- Indiana State Road 37

=== Airports and landing strips ===
- Elwood Airport

== Education ==
- Elwood Community School Corporation
- Frankton-Lapel Community Schools

Pipe Creek Township residents may obtain a free library card from the North Madison County Public Library System with branches in Elwood, Frankton, and Summitville.

== Political districts ==
- Indiana's 5th congressional district
- State House District 36
- State Senate District 20
- State Senate District 25
