= Tetersburg, Indiana =

- Unincorporated community
- Location within Indiana Location within the United States
- Coordinates: 40°16′31″N 86°09′04″W
- Country: United States
- State: Indiana
- County: Tipton
- Township: Jefferson
- Established: 1848
- Named for: The Teter family
- Elevation: 912 ft (278 m)
- Time zone: UTC-5 (Eastern (EST))
  - Summer (DST): UTC-4 (EDT)
- ZIP code: 46072
- Area code: 765
- FIPS code: 18-75482
- GNIS feature ID: 444655

Tetersburg is an unincorporated community in Jefferson Township, Tipton County, in the U.S. state of Indiana.

It is part of the Kokomo, Indiana Metropolitan Statistical Area.

== History ==
Tetersburg was named after the Teter family, who first settled the area in 1840.

Tetersurg was laid out, but never platted, over the land of two farms, Mahlon Farm and a farm owned by Asa Teter, in 1848. The first house built in Tetersburg was a log cabin built by Tansy and Cumbaugh. The oldest religious congregation in the county, a Christian church, was founded in Tetersburg in 1849. In 1875, the LaFayette, Muncie and Bloomington Railroad was built one mile north of Tetersburg. The effects of the railroad being built north of Tetersburg was described by historian Marvin Pershing as having "effectively killed the town."

A post office was established at Tetersburg in 1849, and remained in operation until it was discontinued in 1879.
