= Madison Township, Tipton County, Indiana =

Madison Township
- Township
- Location in Tipton County
- Coordinates: 40°16′34″N 85°54′38″W
- Country: United States
- State: Indiana
- County: Tipton

Government
  - Type: Indiana township

Area
  - Total: 44.56 sq mi (115.4 km^{2})
  - Land: 44.56 sq mi (115.4 km^{2})
  - Water: 0 sq mi (0 km^{2}) 0%
- Elevation: 866 ft (264 m)

Population (2020)
  - Total: 1,286
  - Density: 28.86/sq mi (11.14/km^{2})
- Time zone: UTC-5 (Eastern (EST))
  - Summer (DST): UTC-4 (EDT)
- ZIP codes: 46031, 46036, 46047, 46072, 46076
- Area code: 765
- GNIS feature ID: 453599

Madison Township is one of six townships in Tipton County, Indiana, United States. As of the 2020 census, its population was 1,286 (down from 1,396 at 2010) and it contained 571 housing units.

== History ==
Non-Indigenous people began settling in Madison Township around 1830, when it was still a part of Hamilton County and northern parts of the future township were Indian land. Settlers moved to the southern part of the future township first. The first Christian religious services were held in the township in 1839 as a Methodist Episcopal Church congregation meeting which was held at a school house. Tipton County commissioners ordered Madison Township to be created in June 1844.

== Geography ==
The township was originally 36-square miles in size. In September 1846, a half mile strip of the western part of the township was given to Cicero Township and a portion of the northern area was made into Wildcat Township. This left Madison Township at 44-square miles in size. According to the 2010 census, the township has a total area of 44.56 square miles (115.4 km^{2}), all land.

=== Topography ===
The main waterway that flows through the township is Duck Creek, a stream that flows through the eastern part of the township. It is a tributary of Pollywog Creek. Bear Creek's eastern fork flows through the southern part of the township. The land is flat except near the southeastern corner, where Duck Creek causes some unevenness in the topography.

=== Flora ===
Historically, the township was covered with a dense forest. Walnut trees, Poplar, Oak, Ash, Elm, Maple, Beech, and Sycamore were commonly found. Smaller numbers of Buckeye, Spicebush and Willow were found, too. Small prairies and wetlands were scattered throughout the area.

=== Cities, towns, villages ===
- Elwood (west edge)

=== Unincorporated towns ===
- Curtisville at 40.318372°N 85.898594°W
- Hobbs at 40.283649°N 85.947484°W
- New Lancaster at 40.255039°N 85.879981°W

(This list is based on USGS data and may include former settlements.)

=== Adjacent townships ===
- Wildcat Township (north)
- Duck Creek Township, Madison County (northeast)
- Pipe Creek Township, Madison County (east)
- White River Township, Hamilton County (south)
- Cicero Township (west)

== Economy ==
=== 19th century ===
Early industry in the township comprised wheat, which was exported to Lawrenceburg, Indiana, where better prices were being given for wheat than in northern Indiana. Mills were located in Hamilton County, and Madison Township wheat was used to make flour and corn-crackers. Native peoples in the area traded deer skins, venison, bead work and other items for gunpowder, food and clothing. In 1848, the first mill was built in the township. It was owned by Gilbert Wright and sourced power from Duck Creek's west fork. Many of the first homes in the township used lumber from the mill. A second mill, operated with steam, was built in 1868, by B.F. Marshall, in Curtisville.

=== 20th century ===
By 1914, the township economy was primarily agriculture based.

== Education ==
=== Early history ===
The first school in the township was started in 1840, in a log cabin. Cole Birch was the first teacher. He was described as the "handy man of the neighborhood," and not a trained teacher. Birch helped residents with their health problems, built houses, played violin at parties, and was known for being able to "kill more deer, market more coon skins, tell more yarns, sing louder at a camp meeting and stand up under more vile whisky than any other man in the entire county."

The first frame school in the township was built in New Lancaster. It replaced a log cabin school. It was used until the early 20th century. The first public school in the township was introduced in 1854.

=== Today ===
Students in Madison Township attend schools in the Tipton Community School Corporation.

== Government ==
- Indiana's 5th congressional district
- State House District 35
- State Senate District 20

== Infrastructure ==
In the early 20th century, the Lake Erie & Western Railroad and a branch of the Indiana Union Traction Company traveled east to west through the township.

=== Major highways ===
- Indiana State Road 28
- Indiana State Road 37

=== Airports and landing strips ===
- Ellison Airport

=== Cemeteries ===
The township contains these three cemeteries: Cook, Hobbs and Mount Pleasant.
