= Dundee, Indiana =

- Unincorporated community
- Location within Indiana Location within the United States
- Coordinates: 40°16′20″N 85°45′22″W
- Country: United States
- State: Indiana
- County: Madison
- Township: Pipe Creek
- Elevation: 873 ft (266 m)
- ZIP code: 46001
- FIPS code: 18-18964
- GNIS feature ID: 433774

Dundee is an unincorporated community in Pipe Creek Township, Madison County, Indiana.

== History ==
A post office was established at Dundee in 1876, and remained in operation until it was discontinued in 1902. Dundee was platted in 1883 when the railroad was extended to that point. It was likely named after Dundee, in Scotland.
