= Perkinsville, Indiana =

- Census-designated place
- Location within Indiana Location within the United States
- Coordinates: 40°08′40″N 85°51′30″W
- Country: United States
- State: Indiana
- County: Madison
- Township: Jackson

Area
  - Total: 0.14 sq mi (0.36 km^{2})
  - Land: 0.14 sq mi (0.36 km^{2})
  - Water: 0.0 sq mi (0 km^{2})
- Elevation: 814 ft (248 m)
- ZIP code: 46011 (Anderson)
- GNIS feature ID: 2830457

Perkinsville is an unincorporated community and census-designated place (CDP) in Madison County, Indiana, in the United States. It is home to the locally-famous restaurant, Bonge's Tavern.

== History ==
Perkinsville was laid out in 1837, and named for William Parkins (different spelling), an early settler. Perkinsville contained a post office from 1844 until 1912.

== Geography ==
Perkinsville is located in western Madison County, along the Hamilton County line. Indiana State Road 13, following the county line, forms the western edge of the community. SR 13 leads south 5 miles (8 km) to Fishersburg and north 9 miles (14 km) to Elwood. Anderson, the county seat, is 10 miles (16 km) to the southeast, and Noblesville is 12 miles (19 km) to the southwest.

According to the U.S. Census Bureau, the Perkinsville CDP has an area of 0.14 square miles (0.36 km^{2}), all land. The White River forms the southern boundary of the community.

== Demographics ==
The United States Census Bureau designated Perkinsville as a census designated place in the 2022 American Community Survey.
