= Normanda, Indiana =

- Unincorporated community
- Location within Indiana Location within the United States
- Coordinates: 40°18′09″N 86°09′53″W
- Country: United States
- State: Indiana
- County: Tipton
- Township: Jefferson
- Established: 1849
- Elevation: 922 ft (281 m)
- Time zone: UTC-5 (Eastern (EST))
  - Summer (DST): UTC-4 (EDT)
- ZIP code: 46072
- Area code: 765
- GNIS feature ID: 440204

Normanda is an unincorporated community in Jefferson Township, Tipton County, in the U.S. state of Indiana.

== History ==
Normanda was platted in 1849. The owners of the land were M.P. Evans, Edward Jackson, and Matthew Jones. Evans built the first frame house in the village. In 1850, J.C. Vandevender built the first store room, where he sold a variety of items. That same year, the Presbyterian Church of Tipton was founded in Normanda. It eventually was dissolved, only to be re-organized in Tipton. Just south of the village a railroad was built, which led to the growth of the village stopping. The post office in Normanda was discontinued in 1921.

== Geography ==
Normanda is located in the northern part of Jefferson Township.
