= Elwood Downtown Historic District =

Historic district in Indiana, United States

- U.S. National Register of Historic Places
- U.S. Historic district
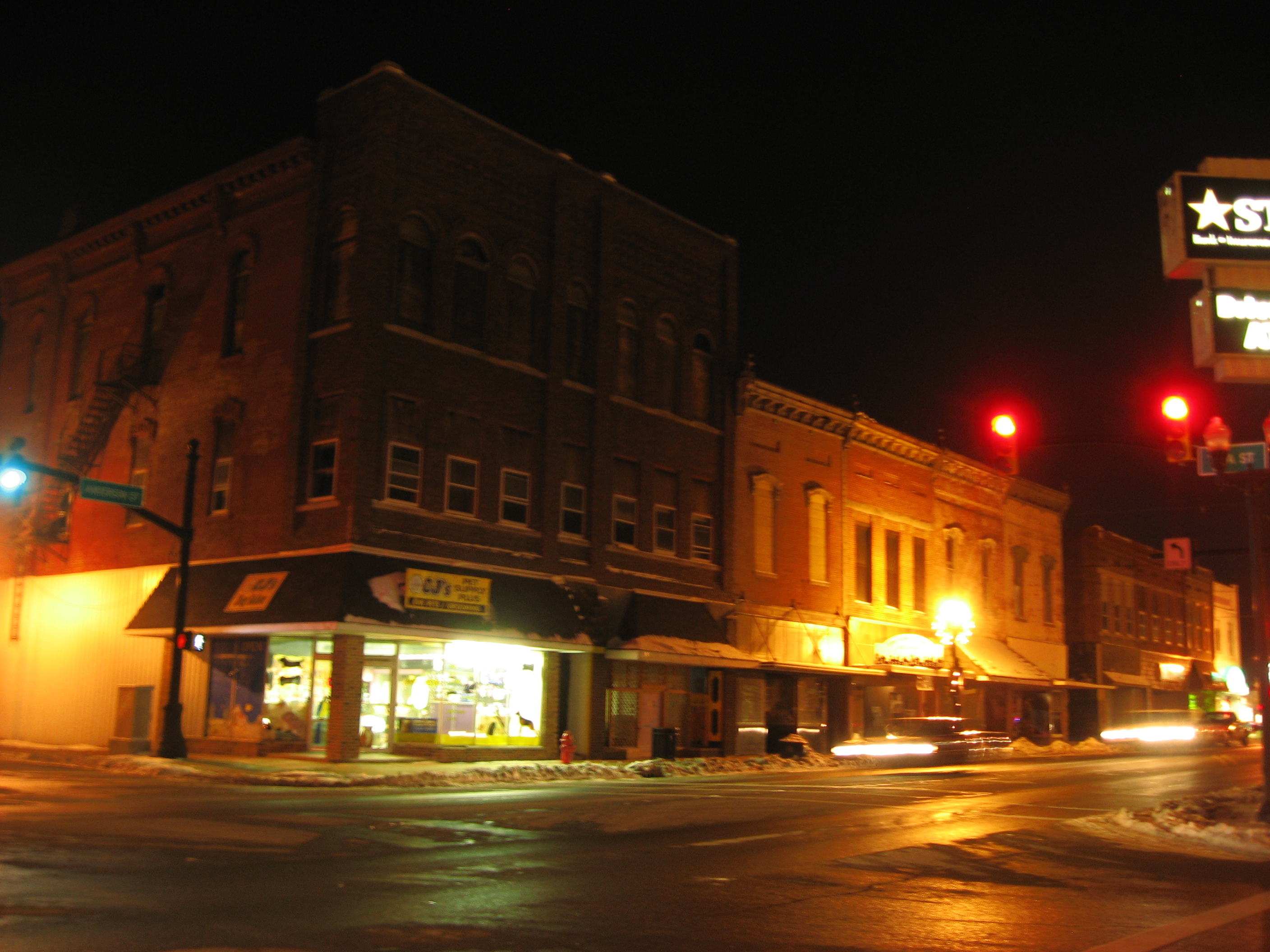
- A major intersection in the district

- Location within Indiana Location within the United States
- Location: Roughly bounded by Duck Creek, N. A St., 16th St., and S. C St., Elwood, Indiana
- Coordinates: 40°16′35″N 85°50′30″W
- Area: 45 acres (18 ha)
- Built: 1887
- Architect: J.J. Wood & Co., et al.
- Architectural style: Late Victorian, Late 19th And Early 20th Century American Movements
- NRHP reference No.: 02001175
- Added to NRHP: October 15, 2002

The Elwood Downtown Historic District is a national historic district located at Elwood, Indiana. The district encompasses 51 contributing buildings and one contributing object in the central business district of Elwood. It developed between about 1887 and 1952, and includes notable examples of Late Victorian, Romanesque Revival, Neoclassical, and Art Deco style architecture. Notable buildings include the Calloway Block (c. 1895), Dehority Block (1894), St. Joseph Catholic Church (1899), United Methodist Church (1899), U.S. Post Office (1911), Carnegie Library (1901), former Elwood City Hall (1899), the Leeson's Building (c. 1930), and the Opera House (c. 1887).

It was listed in the National Register of Historic Places in 2002.
