= Curtisville, Indiana =

- Unincorporated community
- Location within Indiana Location within the United States
- Coordinates: 40°19′06″N 85°53′55″W
- Country: United States
- State: Indiana
- County: Tipton
- Township: Madison
- Platted: 1873
- Founder: L.B. Colvin
- Elevation: 876 ft (267 m)
- Time zone: UTC-5 (Eastern (EST))
  - Summer (DST): UTC-4 (EDT)
- ZIP code: 46036
- Area code: 765
- FIPS code: 18-16462
- GNIS feature ID: 433262

Curtisville is an unincorporated community in Madison Township, Tipton County, in the U.S. state of Indiana.

The community is part of the Kokomo, Indiana Metropolitan Statistical Area.

== History ==
Curtisville was founded by L.B. Colvin just prior to 1859. Colvin built a sawmill on the railroad that traveled through Madison Township and sold as much lumber as possible so he could secure a train station. Around the same time the first retail operations were opened in Curtisville, in a building on the east side of town that was built by A.B. Newman. Lumber remained the primarily economy for the town. Other services in Curtisville included blacksmithing.

In 1859, a post office was installed in Curtisville. Jacob Oldacre served as postmaster. The post office ran until it was discontinued in 1951. A Missionary Baptists congregation was founded in Curtisville in 1860. A church was built in 1861. The land was surveyed and divided into a plat in 1873. As of 1914, 200 people lived in town and the primary economic driver was the Curtisville Tile and Brick Company.
