= Lafayette Township, Madison County, Indiana =

Lafayette Township
- Township
- Location in Madison County
- Coordinates: 40°10′43″N 85°43′46″W
- Country: United States
- State: Indiana
- County: Madison

Government
  - Type: Indiana township

Area
  - Total: 35.29 sq mi (91.4 km^{2})
  - Land: 35.29 sq mi (91.4 km^{2})
  - Water: 0 sq mi (0 km^{2}) 0%
- Elevation: 873 ft (266 m)

Population (2020)
  - Total: 5,102
  - Density: 149.5/sq mi (57.7/km^{2})
- ZIP codes: 46001, 46011, 46012, 46044
- GNIS feature ID: 0453532

Lafayette Township is one of fourteen townships in Madison County, Indiana, United States. As of the 2010 census, its population was 5,275 and it contained 2,379 housing units.

Lafayette Township was organized in 1836.

== Geography ==
According to the 2010 census, the township has a total area of 35.29 square miles (91.4 km^{2}), all land.

=== Cities, towns, villages ===
- Anderson (north edge)
- Frankton (south half)

=== Unincorporated towns ===
- Florida at 40.160319°N 85.710254°W
- Linwood at 40.193652°N 85.681643°W
- North Anderson at 40.135319°N 85.678032°W
- Prosperity at 40.179208°N 85.671920°W

(This list is based on USGS data and may include former settlements.)

=== Cemeteries ===
The township contains Independent Order of Odd Fellows Cemetery.

=== Major highways ===
- Indiana State Road 9

=== Airports and landing strips ===
- H and R Skylane Airport

== Education ==
- Anderson Community School Corporation
- Frankton-Lapel Community Schools

Lafayette Township residents may obtain a free library card from the North Madison County Public Library System with branches in Elwood, Frankton, and Summitville.

== Political districts ==
- Indiana's 6th congressional district
- State House District 36
- State Senate District 25
