= Jackson, Indiana =

Jackson, Indiana Jackson Station
- Unincorporated community
- Location within Indiana Location within the United States
- Coordinates: 40°19′45″N 86°03′39″W
- Country: United States
- State: Indiana
- County: Tipton
- Township: Cicero
- Elevation: 879 ft (268 m)
- Time zone: UTC-5 (Eastern (EST))
  - Summer (DST): UTC-4 (EDT)
- ZIP code: 46072
- Area code: 765
- GNIS feature ID: 446670

Jackson, also known as Jackson Station, and Jacksons is an unincorporated community in Cicero Township, Tipton County, in the U.S. state of Indiana.

== History ==
Jackson was located 3.5 miles north of Tipton, Indiana. The village was founded around the building of a saw mill, which operated on steam, by Newton J. Jackson and George Kane in 1851. In 1854, the Peru and Indianapolis Railroad was completed and a train station was built in Jackson. The village grew around the increased number of shipments that were processed at the station. Elijah C. Elliott opened a general store in the village after 1865. Elliott also had a factory that made "staves and heading". By 1914, the railroad station was closed. At that time, a school and church still existed in the village.

A post office was established under the name Jackson Station in 1863, was renamed Jackson in 1882, and operated until it was discontinued in 1905.
