= Pipe Creek (White River tributary) =

Stream in Indiana, U.S.

Coordinates: 40°08′33″N 85°52′35″W

Pipe Creek is a stream in the U.S. state of Indiana. It is a tributary of the White River, and is named for Captain Pipe, a Delaware chief.

It has a mean annual discharge of 114 cubic feet per second at Frankton, Indiana.

== See also ==
- List of rivers of Indiana
