= New Lancaster, Indiana =

- Unincorporated community
- Location within Indiana Location within the United States
- Coordinates: 40°15′18″N 85°52′48″W
- Country: United States
- State: Indiana
- County: Tipton
- Township: Madison
- Elevation: 863 ft (263 m)
- Time zone: UTC-5 (Eastern (EST))
  - Summer (DST): UTC-4 (EDT)
- ZIP code: 46036
- Area code: 765
- GNIS feature ID: 440071

New Lancaster is an unincorporated community in Madison Township, Tipton County, Indiana, United States.

New Lancaster is located at 40°15′18″N 85°52′48″W.

New Lancaster is located in Tipton County.

The following counties adjoin and form the boundaries of Tipton County: Clinton, Grant, Hamilton, Howard & Madison.

New Lancaster Cemetery also known as Cook Cemetery; is a mile of cross roads in New Lancaster, Tipton County, Indiana. Located 1 mile west of New Lancaster, Samuel Townsend and Michael Mitchell laid it in 1845. Michael Mitchell, and neighbor Samuel Townsend each gave one-half acre to establish this cemetery near New Lancaster. Later the Mitchell's sold their land surrounding the cemetery to William Cook and sometimes this cemetery is referred to as Cook Cemetery. 350S 625E Madison Twp., Tipton Co., Indiana.

The New Lancaster School is still standing but now used as a home. New Lancaster, A post office was established at New Lancaster in 1847, and remained in operation until it was discontinued in 1903 and at least one general store. Today, only a few residential farm houses remain and the cemetery.

== History ==
A post office was established at New Lancaster in 1847, and remained in operation until it was discontinued in 1903.
