= Tipton County, Indiana =

County in Indiana, United States

- County
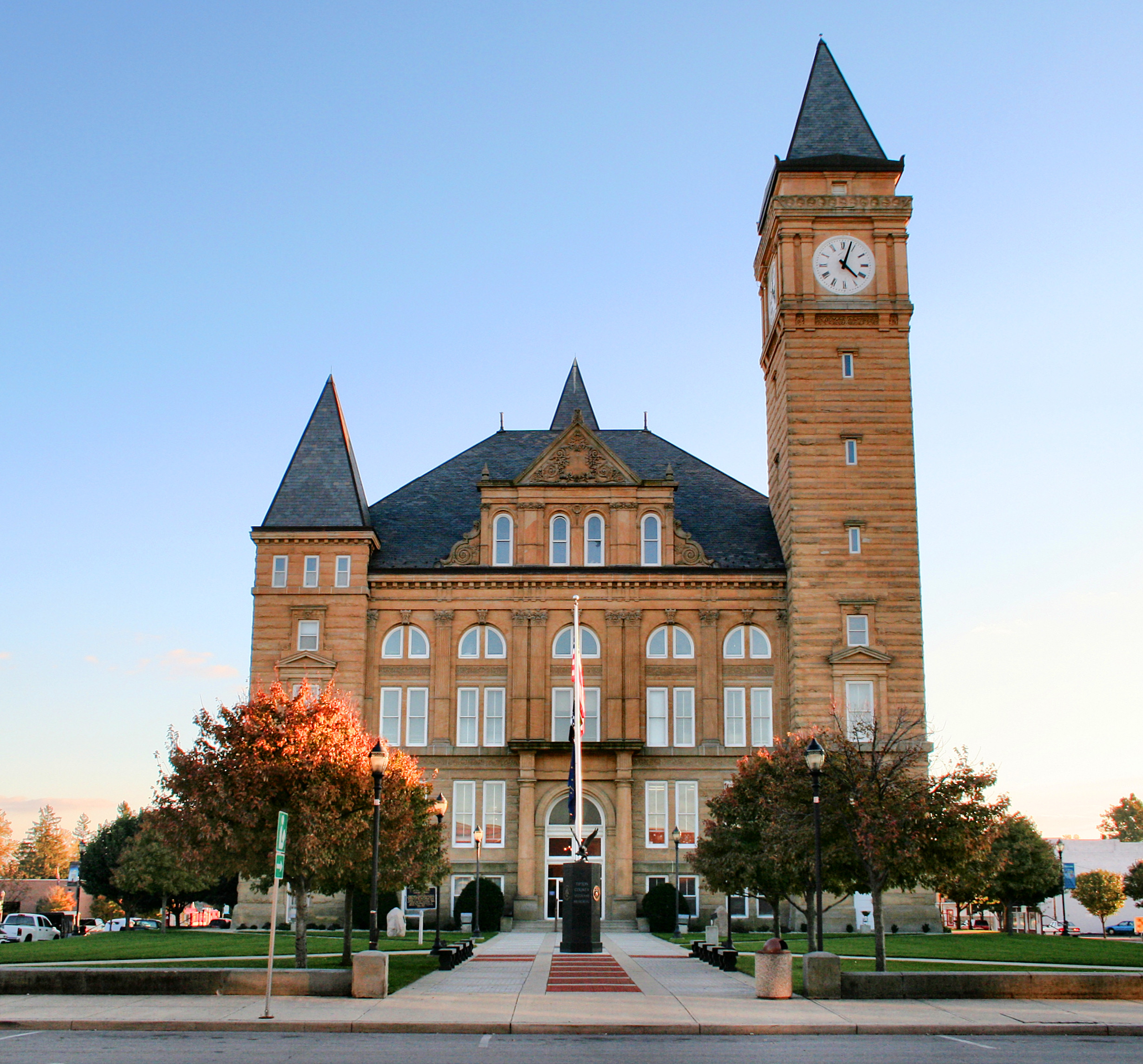
- Tipton County Courthouse

- Seal

- Location within the U.S. state of Indiana
- Coordinates: 40°19′N 86°03′W
- Country: United States
- State: Indiana
- Founded: January 15, 1844
- Named for: John Tipton
- Seat: Tipton
- Largest city: Tipton

Area
  - Total: 260.57 sq mi (674.9 km^{2})
  - Land: 260.54 sq mi (674.8 km^{2})
  - Water: 0.03 sq mi (0.078 km^{2}) 0.01%

Population (2020)
  - Total: 15,359
  - Estimate (2025): 15,319 ▼
  - Density: 58.951/sq mi (22.761/km^{2})
- Time zone: UTC−5 (Eastern)
  - Summer (DST): UTC−4 (EDT)
- Congressional district: 5th
- Website: www.tiptongov.com
- Indiana county number 80; FIPS Code 159

Tipton County is a county in the U.S. state of Indiana, located north of the state capital of Indianapolis. According to the 2020 census, it had a population of 15,359. Its county seat is Tipton. The county has four incorporated towns with a total population of about 7,000, as well as many small unincorporated communities. It is divided into six townships which provide local services. Three Indiana state roads and one U.S. Route cross the county, as do two railroad lines. Before the arrival of non-indigenous settlers in the early 19th century, the area was inhabited by several Native American tribes. The county was officially established in 1844, one of the last Indiana counties to be settled. Tipton and Howard Counties were established by the same legislative action on January 15.

== History ==
Prior to the arrival of non-indigenous settlers in the 1830s, the area of Tipton County was inhabited by the Miami and Delaware tribes. Tipton County was formed in 1844. It was named for John Tipton, a soldier of the Battle of Tippecanoe in 1811. Tipton served as United States Senator for Indiana from 1831 until shortly before his death in 1839. The first murder in the county occurred in October 1851. Harvey Moon killed Andrew Hornbeck with a knife. Moon was tried in Indianapolis, as a jury could not be empaneled in Tipton County. He was sentenced to five years in prison. He escaped prison and was not recaptured.

=== Courthouse ===
The first Tipton County Courthouse was a two-story frame building. It was planned in early 1845 and was completed by the end of the year at a cost of about $1200. (Note: A $1,200 capital expense in 1845 would be roughly equivalent to $602,000 in 2010.) It was expanded the following year. By 1858 a new courthouse was needed, and the brick building was completed by 1859 at a cost of approximately $15,000. (Note: A $15,000 capital expense in 1858 would be roughly equivalent to $5,200,000 in 2010.) The present courthouse was designed by Adolph Sherrer. He had taken over the Indiana Statehouse project when architect Edwin May died in 1880; five years after the completion of that project in 1888, Scherrer began work on the Tipton building, which was built of sandstone in a Romanesque style with a clock tower of 206 feet elevation including the flagstaff on top. It was built 1893–94 by Pierce and Morgan of Indianapolis at a cost of $170,988. (Note: A $171,000 capital expense in 1894 would be roughly equivalent to $39,000,000 in 2010.) It is one of several Romanesque courthouses dating from the 1890s that are still in use.

== Geography ==
Map of Tipton County

Tipton County falls near the center of Indiana. Most of the county consists of level till plain with elevations from 850 feet (260 m) to 900 feet (270 m) above sea level. Prior to settlement by non-indigenous people, it was mostly covered with dense forests consisting of oak, beech, maple, walnut, hickory, sycamore and tulip trees. The southern part of the county has better natural drainage, and this area was first cleared for agriculture. Much of the rest of the county tended to be swampy due to the level ground and lack of sufficient natural waterways, so drainage channels had to be dug to make the land suitable for farming. According to the 2010 census, the county has a total area of 260.57 square miles (674.9 km^{2}), of which 260.54 square miles (674.8 km^{2}) (or 99.99%) is land and 0.03 square miles (0.078 km^{2}) (or 0.01%) is water.

=== Adjacent counties ===
- Clinton County – west
- Grant County - northeast
- Hamilton County – south
- Howard County – north and northwest
- Madison County – east and southeast

=== Incorporated communities ===
- Tipton – the county seat, near the county center. Its 2010 population was 5,106.
- Kempton – near the western border, in Jefferson Township. Its 2010 population was 335.
- Sharpsville – near the northern border, in Liberty Township. Its 2010 population was 607.
- Windfall - in northeast corner of the county, in Wildcat Township. Its 2010 population was 708.

The city of Elwood lies in Madison County to the east and extends slightly over the border; as of the 2000 census, seven Elwood residents lived in Tipton County.

=== Unincorporated communities ===
- Curtisville
- East Union
- Ekin
- Goldsmith
- Groomsville
- Hobbs
- Jackson
- Nevada
- New Lancaster
- Normanda
- Tetersburg
- West Elwood

=== Townships ===
- Cicero
- Jefferson
- Liberty
- Madison
- Prairie
- Wildcat

=== Climate and weather ===
Tipton, Indiana

Climate chart (precipitation, max. and min. temperature)
| J | F | M | A | M | J | J | A | S | O | N | D |
| 1.9 31 15 | 1.7 37 19 | 3 47 28 | 3.6 60 36 | 4 71 47 | 4.2 80 57 | 4.2 83 61 | 3 81 58 | 2.9 76 51 | 2.5 64 40 | 3.2 49 31 | 2.9 37 21 |
- █ Average max. and min. temperatures in °F
- █ Precipitation totals in inches
- Source: The Weather Channel
Metric conversion
| J | F | M | A | M | J | J | A | S | O | N | D |
| 49 −1 −9 | 42 3 −7 | 77 8 −2 | 92 16 2 | 101 22 8 | 108 27 14 | 107 28 16 | 77 27 14 | 73 24 11 | 63 18 4 | 82 9 −1 | 75 3 −6 |
- █ Average max. and min. temperatures in °C
- █ Precipitation totals in mm

Tipton County is in the humid continental climate region of the United States along with most of Indiana. Its Köppen climate classification is Dfa, meaning that it is cold, has no dry season, and has a hot summer. In recent years, average temperatures in Tipton have ranged from a low of 15 °F (−9 °C) in January to a high of 83 °F (28 °C) in July, although a record low of −25 °F (−32 °C) was recorded in January 1994 and a record high of 98 °F (37 °C) was recorded in July 1999. Average monthly precipitation ranged from 1.67 inches (42 mm) in February to 4.24 inches (108 mm) in June. From 1950 through 2009, 13 tornadoes were reported in Tipton County, resulting in two deaths and several injuries; the total estimated property damage was over $3 million.

== Demographics ==
Historical population
| Census | Pop. | Note | %± |
|---|---|---|---|
| 1850 | 3,532 | | — |
| 1860 | 8,170 | | 131.3% |
| 1870 | 11,953 | | 46.3% |
| 1880 | 14,407 | | 20.5% |
| 1890 | 18,157 | | 26.0% |
| 1900 | 19,116 | | 5.3% |
| 1910 | 17,459 | | −8.7% |
| 1920 | 16,152 | | −7.5% |
| 1930 | 15,208 | | −5.8% |
| 1940 | 15,135 | | −0.5% |
| 1950 | 15,566 | | 2.8% |
| 1960 | 15,856 | | 1.9% |
| 1970 | 16,650 | | 5.0% |
| 1980 | 16,819 | | 1.0% |
| 1990 | 16,119 | | −4.2% |
| 2000 | 16,577 | | 2.8% |
| 2010 | 15,936 | | −3.9% |
| 2020 | 15,359 | | −3.6% |
| 2025 (est.) | 15,319 | ▼ | −0.3% |
U.S. Decennial Census; 1790–1960 1900–1990; 1990–2000 2010

=== Racial and ethnic composition ===
Tipton County, Indiana – Racial and ethnic composition Note: the US Census treats Hispanic/Latino as an ethnic category. This table excludes Latinos from the racial categories and assigns them to a separate category. Hispanics/Latinos may be of any race.
| Race / Ethnicity (NH = Non-Hispanic) | Pop 1980 | Pop 1990 | Pop 2000 | Pop 2010 | Pop 2020 | % 1980 | % 1990 | % 2000 | % 2010 | % 2020 |
|---|---|---|---|---|---|---|---|---|---|---|
| White alone (NH) | 16,652 | 15,912 | 16,188 | 15,355 | 14,367 | 99.01% | 98.72% | 97.65% | 96.35% | 93.54% |
| Black or African American alone (NH) | 2 | 10 | 22 | 28 | 46 | 0.01% | 0.06% | 0.13% | 0.18% | 0.30% |
| Native American or Alaska Native alone (NH) | 25 | 20 | 27 | 20 | 13 | 0.15% | 0.12% | 0.16% | 0.13% | 0.08% |
| Asian alone (NH) | 24 | 49 | 50 | 64 | 46 | 0.14% | 0.30% | 0.30% | 0.40% | 0.30% |
| Native Hawaiian or Pacific Islander alone (NH) | x | x | 2 | 5 | 2 | x | x | 0.01% | 0.03% | 0.01% |
| Other race alone (NH) | 3 | 7 | 4 | 4 | 56 | 0.02% | 0.04% | 0.02% | 0.03% | 0.36% |
| Mixed race or Multiracial (NH) | x | x | 83 | 114 | 395 | x | x | 0.50% | 0.72% | 2.57% |
| Hispanic or Latino (any race) | 113 | 121 | 201 | 346 | 434 | 0.67% | 0.75% | 1.21% | 2.17% | 2.83% |
| Total | 16,819 | 16,119 | 16,577 | 15,936 | 15,359 | 100.00% | 100.00% | 100.00% | 100.00% | 100.00% |

=== 2020 census ===
As of the 2020 census, the county had a population of 15,359. The median age was 44.4 years. 21.4% of residents were under the age of 18 and 21.4% of residents were 65 years of age or older. For every 100 females there were 98.0 males, and for every 100 females age 18 and over there were 97.1 males age 18 and over.

The racial makeup of the county was 94.5% White, 0.3% Black or African American, 0.1% American Indian and Alaska Native, 0.3% Asian, <0.1% Native Hawaiian and Pacific Islander, 1.2% from some other race, and 3.5% from two or more races. Hispanic or Latino residents of any race comprised 2.8% of the population.

38.5% of residents lived in urban areas, while 61.5% lived in rural areas.

There were 6,244 households in the county, of which 27.8% had children under the age of 18 living in them. Of all households, 54.4% were married-couple households, 17.4% were households with a male householder and no spouse or partner present, and 21.8% were households with a female householder and no spouse or partner present. About 25.9% of all households were made up of individuals and 13.6% had someone living alone who was 65 years of age or older.

There were 6,797 housing units, of which 8.1% were vacant. Among occupied housing units, 81.5% were owner-occupied and 18.5% were renter-occupied. The homeowner vacancy rate was 1.9% and the rental vacancy rate was 8.1%.

=== 2010 census ===
As of the 2010 United States census, there were 15,936 people, 6,376 households, and 4,517 families residing in the county. The population density was 61.2 inhabitants per square mile (23.6/km^{2}). There were 6,998 housing units at an average density of 26.9 per square mile (10.4/km^{2}). The racial makeup of the county was 97.6% white, 0.4% Asian, 0.2% black or African American, 0.1% American Indian, 0.7% from other races, and 1.0% from two or more races. Those of Hispanic or Latino origin made up 2.2% of the population. In terms of ancestry, 28.5% were German, 14.5% were American, 12.3% were English, and 9.6% were Irish. Of the 6,376 households, 30.7% had children under the age of 18 living with them, 57.1% were married couples living together, 9.6% had a female householder with no husband present, 29.2% were non-families, and 25.4% of all households were made up of individuals. The average household size was 2.47 and the average family size was 2.93. The median age was 42.6 years. The median income for a household in the county was $47,697 and the median income for a family was $61,115. Males had a median income of $42,763 versus $29,832 for females. The per capita income for the county was $23,499. About 3.3% of families and 6.5% of the population were below the poverty line, including 7.7% of those under age 18 and 5.5% of those age 65 or over.

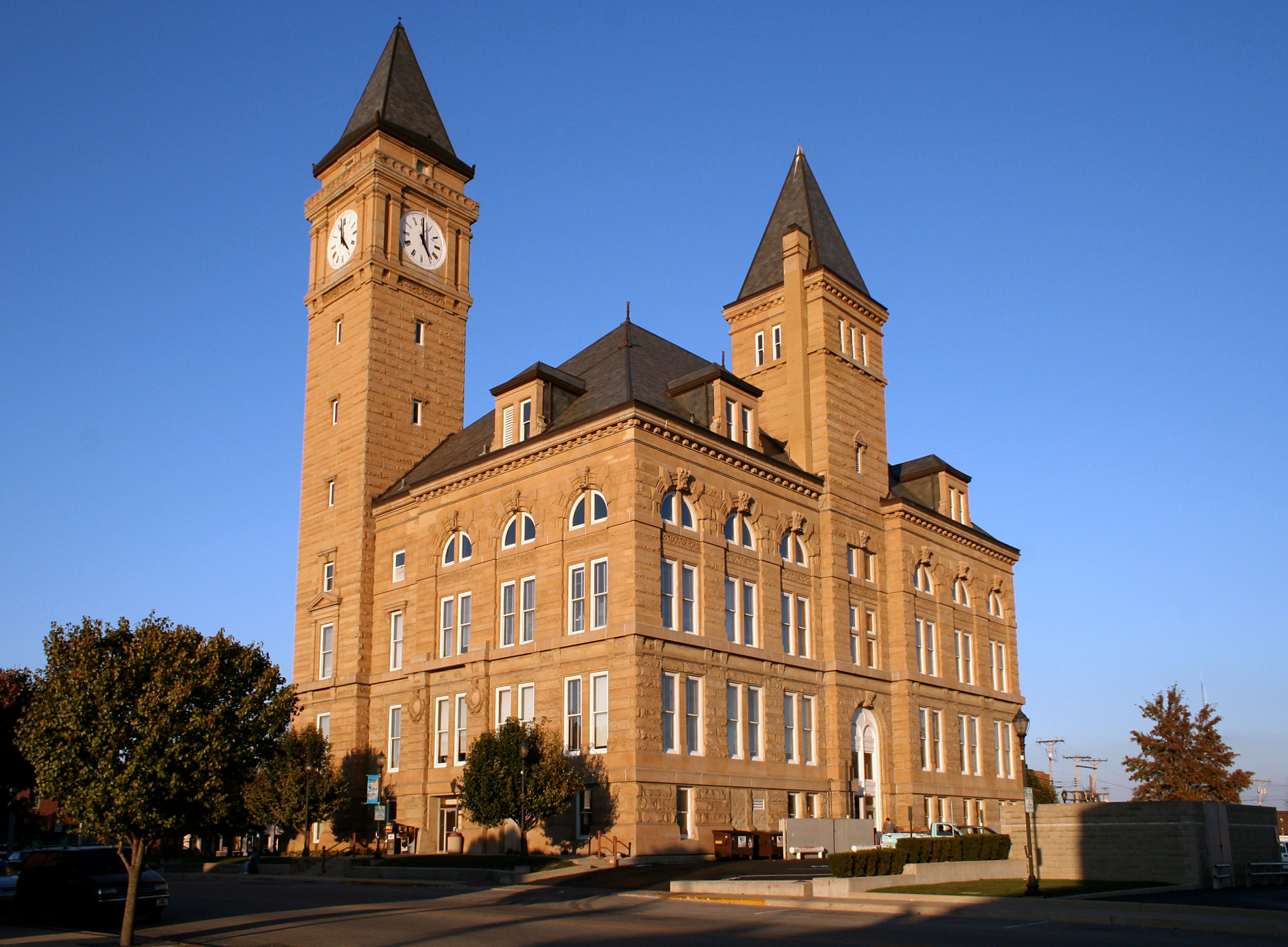
Another view of the courthouse

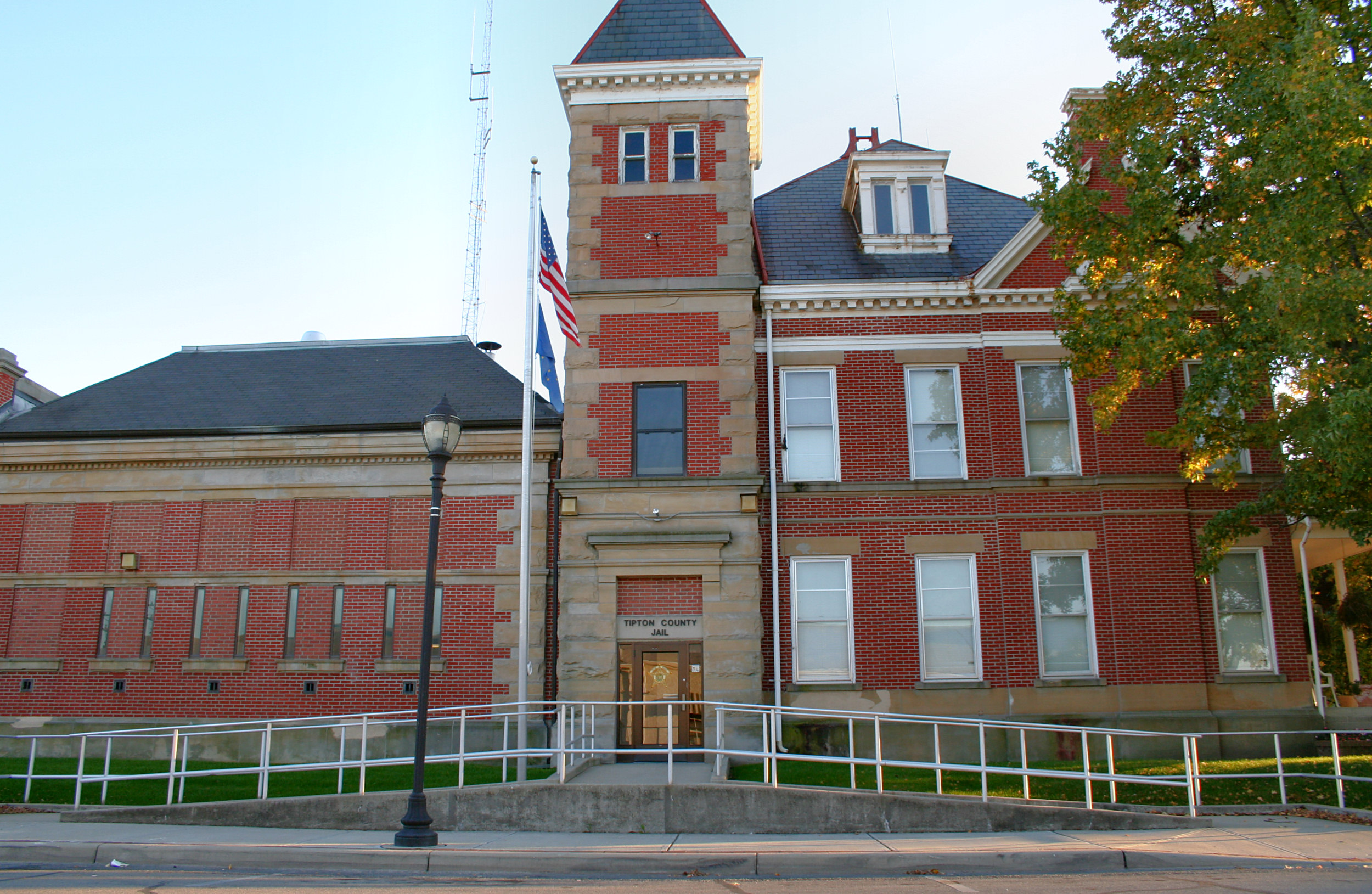
Tipton County jail

== Economy ==
Tipton County's economy is supported by a labor force of about 7700 workers with an unemployment rate in December 2015 of 3.8%.

=== Agriculture ===
Historically, Tipton County's economy has been agriculturally based. In 1914, the county had 2,067 working farms and 166,400 acres of farm land. The early settlers raised corn, wheat, oats, rye, flax, and potatoes, with alfalfa in the prairie areas. Fruit was profitable in the county before 1880, but blight lessened yield and fruit growing nearly halted. The Tipton County Agricultural Society was organized in August 1855. They held the first county fair that October. It was described as a "failure," and was followed by another unsuccessful fair the following year. That organization was dissolved, another formed, only to be dissolved again. A third organization, the Tipton County Joint-Stock Agricultural Society formed in 1874. That organization eventually failed and finally, the Tipton County Fair Company was formed in 1879. By the early 20th century, corn and wheat were primary crops.

=== Banking ===
Vickrey Bank, founded in the 1880s, was the county's first bank. It became Union Bank, and later Farmers Loan and Trust. In 1876, the Tipton County Bank was founded. It merged with First National Bank in 1902. Other county banks included Citizens National Bank (1898), Farmers Loan and Trust Company (1906), People's State Bank (1892), Sharpsville Bank (1902), and State Bank of Kempton (1900). None of these banks exists today. Farmers' State Bank was formed in 1914 and remains in business today as First Farmers Bank & Trust.

== Government ==
The county government is a constitutional body granted specific powers by the Constitution of Indiana and the Indiana Code. The county council is the legislative branch of the county government and controls all spending and revenue collection. Representatives are elected from county districts. The council members serve four-year terms and are responsible for setting salaries, the annual budget and special spending. The council also has limited authority to impose local taxes, in the form of an income and property tax that is subject to state level approval, excise taxes and service taxes.

A board of commissioners forms the county's executive body. They are elected county–wide, in four–year staggered terms. One commissioner serves as board president. The board executes the acts legislated by the council, collects revenue, and manages the day-to-day running of county government. The county maintains a small claims court for civil cases. The judge on the court is elected to a term of four years and must be a member of the Indiana Bar Association. The judge is assisted by a constable who is elected to a four-year term. In some cases, court decisions can be appealed to the state level circuit court. The county has several other elected offices, including sheriff, coroner, auditor, treasurer, recorder, surveyor and circuit court clerk. Each of these elected officers serves a term of four years and oversees a different part of county government. Members elected to county government positions are required to declare party affiliations and be residents of the county. Each township has a trustee who administers rural fire protection and ambulance service, provides poor relief and manages cemetery care, among other duties. The trustee is assisted by a three-member township board. The trustees and board members are elected to four-year terms. Tipton County is part of Indiana's 5th congressional district; Indiana Senate districts 20 and 21; and Indiana House of Representatives districts 32 and 35.

United States presidential election results for Tipton County, Indiana
| Year | Republican | | Democratic | | Third party(ies) | |
| Year | No. | % | No. | % | No. | % |
|---|---|---|---|---|---|---|
| 1888 | 2,042 | 44.93% | 2,370 | 52.15% | 133 | 2.93% |
| 1892 | 1,788 | 39.80% | 2,008 | 44.70% | 696 | 15.49% |
| 1896 | 2,263 | 44.07% | 2,816 | 54.84% | 56 | 1.09% |
| 1900 | 2,410 | 47.26% | 2,436 | 47.77% | 253 | 4.96% |
| 1904 | 2,654 | 50.75% | 2,279 | 43.58% | 297 | 5.68% |
| 1908 | 2,395 | 46.45% | 2,556 | 49.57% | 205 | 3.98% |
| 1912 | 1,262 | 26.92% | 2,185 | 46.61% | 1,241 | 26.47% |
| 1916 | 2,166 | 45.32% | 2,337 | 48.90% | 276 | 5.78% |
| 1920 | 4,357 | 51.43% | 3,956 | 46.69% | 159 | 1.88% |
| 1924 | 4,183 | 51.33% | 3,660 | 44.91% | 307 | 3.77% |
| 1928 | 4,774 | 59.30% | 3,186 | 39.58% | 90 | 1.12% |
| 1932 | 3,680 | 42.19% | 4,898 | 56.15% | 145 | 1.66% |
| 1936 | 3,842 | 43.96% | 4,796 | 54.88% | 101 | 1.16% |
| 1940 | 4,749 | 52.90% | 4,173 | 46.48% | 56 | 0.62% |
| 1944 | 4,296 | 54.77% | 3,427 | 43.70% | 120 | 1.53% |
| 1948 | 4,169 | 50.78% | 3,925 | 47.81% | 116 | 1.41% |
| 1952 | 5,299 | 60.59% | 3,362 | 38.44% | 84 | 0.96% |
| 1956 | 4,939 | 59.47% | 3,320 | 39.98% | 46 | 0.55% |
| 1960 | 4,924 | 59.88% | 3,299 | 40.12% | 0 | 0.00% |
| 1964 | 3,863 | 46.45% | 4,410 | 53.03% | 43 | 0.52% |
| 1968 | 4,270 | 54.73% | 2,646 | 33.91% | 886 | 11.36% |
| 1972 | 5,674 | 72.67% | 2,095 | 26.83% | 39 | 0.50% |
| 1976 | 4,776 | 57.35% | 3,428 | 41.16% | 124 | 1.49% |
| 1980 | 5,150 | 63.81% | 2,547 | 31.56% | 374 | 4.63% |
| 1984 | 5,687 | 70.48% | 2,328 | 28.85% | 54 | 0.67% |
| 1988 | 5,148 | 67.15% | 2,485 | 32.42% | 33 | 0.43% |
| 1992 | 3,906 | 49.55% | 2,125 | 26.96% | 1,852 | 23.49% |
| 1996 | 3,980 | 53.89% | 2,478 | 33.55% | 927 | 12.55% |
| 2000 | 4,784 | 65.39% | 2,392 | 32.70% | 140 | 1.91% |
| 2004 | 5,628 | 71.31% | 2,203 | 27.91% | 61 | 0.77% |
| 2008 | 4,452 | 56.80% | 3,250 | 41.46% | 136 | 1.74% |
| 2012 | 4,773 | 64.74% | 2,432 | 32.99% | 168 | 2.28% |
| 2016 | 5,589 | 74.42% | 1,587 | 21.13% | 334 | 4.45% |
| 2020 | 6,110 | 75.21% | 1,834 | 22.58% | 180 | 2.22% |
| 2024 | 5,946 | 74.34% | 1,893 | 23.67% | 159 | 1.99% |

== Education ==
=== History ===
In 1889, county schools had a total enrollment of 6,225. There were a total of 84 schools across the county. The majority of teachers were male, totaling 81 male and 19 female teachers. They were paid approximately $2 per day. By 1914, the school enrollment totaled 3,701 students, with 65 schools across the county. There were five high schools located across the township in Sharpsville, Tipton, Kempton, Goldsmith and Windfall. There were 218 teachers. They were paid $3.19 a day.

=== Present ===
Tipton County has six schools, managed by three school corporations. The Tipton Community School Corporation includes an elementary school, a middle school, and Tipton High School, all located in Tipton; these schools served a total of 1,821 students during the 2009–2010 school year. In the north part of the county, Tri-Central Community Schools (formerly Northern Community Schools) includes an elementary school and Tri-Central Middle/High School, both located in Sharpsville; these schools served a total of 970 students in 2009–2010. Saint John the Baptist School was located in Tipton and was part of the Diocese of Lafayette Catholic Schools; it was an elementary school and served 82 students during the 2009–2010 school year., but it closed in 2014 due to declining enrollment.

== Media ==
The county's first newspaper was the Tipton County Democrat in 1855. It became the Western Dominion in 1857. In 1858, G.W. Fisher bought the paper and changed its name to the Tipton County Times. The paper's name was changed again in 1862 to the Democratic Union, and then back to the Tipton County Times in 1869. The Tipton Republican was founded in 1860. The newspaper closed when the editor in chief joined the Union Army. Other early newspapers included the Enterprise (1872), the Tipton Advance, (1874), a second Tipton Republican (1876), The Advocate (1878), the Windfall Herald (1891), the Kempton Courier (1907), the Saturday Express (1882), and the Windfall News (1876). None of these papers exists today. The Tipton County Tribune was founded in 1895. The paper continues to be published today.

== Transportation ==
=== Highways ===
- US Route 31 – runs north–south through the middle–western part of the county, passing through Tetersburg.
- State Road 19 – runs north–south through the middle of the county, passing through Tipton.
- State Road 28 – runs east–west through the lower central part of the county, passing through Tipton.
- State Road 213 – runs north–south through the middle–eastern part of the county, passing through Windfall.

Though they do not run through the county, three other state roads touch its southeastern corner:

- State Road 13 – runs north to the SE corner of Tipton County, then NE to Elwood, in Madison County.
- State Road 37 – runs concurrently with State Road 13 in this area running toward Elwood.
- State Road 128 – intersects State Road 13/31 at the SE corner of Tipton County.

=== Railroads ===
Two Norfolk Southern Railway routes run through the county. One line connects Muncie in the east with Frankfort in the west. The other connects Logansport and Kokomo in the north with Indianapolis in the south. The two lines intersect in Tipton.

== Notable people from Tipton County ==
- Charles Benjamin "Babe" Adams (1882–1968) – born in Tipton. Baseball player (pitcher) for Saint Louis Cardinals (1906) and Pittsburgh Pirates (1907–1926).
- John Bunch (1921–2010) – born in Tipton. Jazz pianist with Woody Herman, Benny Goodman and Maynard Ferguson. Music composer.
- Donald Bertrand Tresidder (April 7, 1894 – January 28, 1948) was the president of Stanford University from 1943 until 1948 and brought the school through the difficult years of World War II. Prior to his work at Stanford, he headed the Yosemite Park and Curry Co.

== See also ==
- National Register of Historic Places listings in Tipton County, Indiana
