= Elwood, Indiana =

- City
- City of Elwood
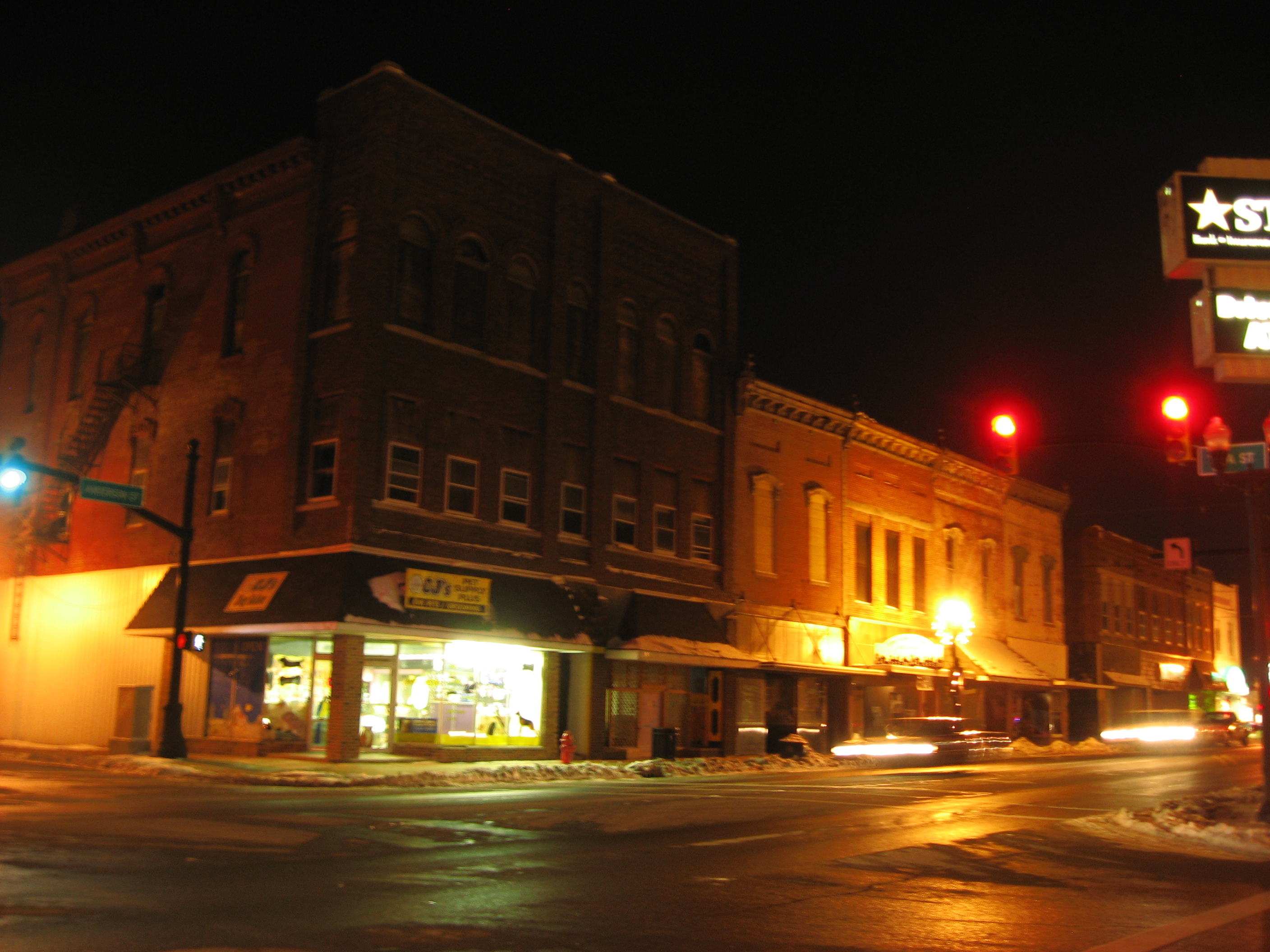
- Elwood Downtown Historic District at night

- Flag Seal

- Location in Madison County and Tipton County, Indiana
- Coordinates: 40°16′26″N 85°50′14″W
- Country: United States
- State: Indiana
- Counties: Madison, Tipton
- Townships: Pipe Creek, Duck Creek, Madison
- Founded: 1853
- Incorporated: 1891

Government
  - Mayor: Todd Jones (D)

Area
  - Total: 3.97 sq mi (10.28 km^{2})
  - Land: 3.97 sq mi (10.28 km^{2})
  - Water: 0 sq mi (0.00 km^{2})
- Elevation: 863 ft (263 m)

Population (2020)
  - Total: 8,410
  - Estimate (2025): 8,469 ▲
  - Density: 2,119.5/sq mi (818.35/km^{2})
- Time zone: UTC-5 (EST)
  - Summer (DST): UTC-4 (EDT)
- ZIP code: 46036
- Area code: 765
- FIPS code: 18-21070
- GNIS feature ID: 2394680-
- Website: elwood-in.com

Elwood is a city in Madison and Tipton counties in the U.S. state of Indiana. The Madison County portion, which is nearly all of the city, is part of the Indianapolis–Carmel–Anderson metropolitan statistical area. The population of Elwood was 8,410 at the 2020 census.

== History ==
Elwood was laid out in 1853 under the name "Duck Creek". It was incorporated as a city in 1891.

A post office was established under the name "Duck Creek" in 1855, was renamed to Elwood in 1869, and has been operating since. The first railroad was constructed in Elwood in 1857.

On August 17, 1940, the Republican National Committee held a formal notification ceremony to recognize Elwood-born Wendell Willkie as its nominee for President of the United States to run against Franklin Roosevelt. Held at Callaway Park on the outskirts of town, the ceremony drew 150,000 people for what would become the largest political rally in American history at the time. People came in 60,000 automobiles, 63 special trains, 300 Pullmans, and 1,200 buses. The Indiana University band led a parade in which 249 other bands also marched in the procession. When Willkie stepped onto the platform, the crowd cheered him for ten minutes before he could begin his speech. However, oppressive heat and Willkie's underwhelming, flat speech left many disappointed by the end of the day.

=== Sundown town ===
By the 1880s, Elwood had become a sundown town, prohibiting Black people from residing within the town. In 1897, when a number of Black families attempted to settle in the town and were driven out, The Evening Times in Washington, D.C., reported that for more than two decades Black people had not been "permitted to remain any length of time." This prohibition remained in place for most of the 20th century.

At the rally for Wendell Willkie, noted above, which drew around 150,000 people to the city, some prominent Black reporters, such as Marse Callaway of Baltimore, were allowed to briefly stay in a hotel downtown, but others were unable to stay the night due to the community's sundown status. Other Black people were discouraged from attempting to attend the rally at all due to the sundown signs posted at the city limits. These signs and policies remained in place for decades afterwards.

By the late twentieth century sundown policies were less strictly enforced, although as recently as 2002 law enforcement in nearby Marion considered Elwood to still be unwelcoming of Black people. In 2015, after Goshen, Indiana, passed a resolution acknowledging its history as a sundown town, Elwood's own past became a topic of discussion. The mayor of Elwood stated that while he had had no knowledge of the racially exclusionary policies of Elwood's past, he would address them if they were part of Elwood's "lingering reputation".

== Geography ==
Elwood is located in northwestern Madison County. The equivalent of two half-blocks of land in Tipton County are also within the city limits.

Indiana State Road 28 passes through the city as Main Street, leading east 9 miles (14 km) to Alexandria and west 10 miles (16 km) to Tipton. State Road 13 (Anderson Street) crosses SR 28 in the center of Elwood; it leads north 10 miles (16 km) to Point Isabel and south 15 miles (24 km) to Lapel. State Road 37 crosses the southeast corner of the city limits, leading northeast 23 miles (37 km) to Marion and southwest 20 miles (32 km) to Noblesville. Anderson, the Madison county seat, is 17 miles (27 km) southeast of Elwood by local roads.

According to the U.S. Census Bureau, Elwood has a total area of 3.97 square miles (10.28 km^{2}), all land. Big Duck Creek flows through the center of town, leading southwest to the White River near Strawtown.

=== Climate ===
Climate data for Elwood, IN (1981-2013 normals-Extremes 1948–2013)
Month	Jan	Feb	Mar	Apr	May	Jun	Jul	Aug	Sep	Oct	Nov	Dec	Year
Record high °F (°C)	69 (21)	74 (23)	84 (29)	88 (31)	94 (34)	99 (37)	103 (39)	99 (37)	101 (38)	92 (33)	83 (28)	72 (22)	103 (39)
Mean maximum °F (°C)	56 (13)	61 (16)	74 (23)	81 (27)	87 (31)	92 (33)	94 (34)	93 (34)	90 (32)	82 (28)	71 (22)	58 (14)	94 (34)
Mean daily maximum °F (°C)	33.7 (0.9)	38.2 (3.4)	49.7 (9.8)	62.2 (16.8)	72.7 (22.6)	81.4 (27.4)	84.5 (29.2)	83.0 (28.3)	77.1 (25.1)	64.6 (18.1)	51.7 (10.9)	37.7 (3.2)	61.4 (16.3)
Daily mean °F (°C)	25.0 (−3.9)	29.4 (−1.4)	39.2 (4.0)	50.3 (10.2)	61.1 (16.2)	70.2 (21.2)	73.4 (23.0)	71.4 (21.9)	64.6 (18.1)	52.5 (11.4)	41.5 (5.3)	29.7 (−1.3)	50.7 (10.4)
Mean daily minimum °F (°C)	16.5 (−8.6)	20.4 (−6.4)	28.7 (−1.8)	38.4 (3.6)	49.7 (9.8)	59.0 (15.0)	62.3 (16.8)	59.7 (15.4)	52.0 (11.1)	40.5 (4.7)	31.9 (−0.1)	21.6 (−5.8)	40.1 (4.5)
Mean minimum °F (°C)	−4 (−20)	−1 (−18)	12 (−11)	24 (−4)	35 (2)	46 (8)	51 (11)	48 (9)	37 (3)	27 (−3)	18 (−8)	2 (−17)	−4 (−20)
Record low °F (°C)	−24 (−31)	−23 (−31)	−10 (−23)	12 (−11)	26 (−3)	36 (2)	43 (6)	37 (3)	28 (−2)	17 (−8)	−5 (−21)	−20 (−29)	−24 (−31)
Average precipitation inches (mm)	2.49 (63)	2.17 (55)	3.00 (76)	3.78 (96)	4.24 (108)	4.45 (113)	4.33 (110)	3.50 (89)	3.50 (89)	2.98 (76)	3.96 (101)	3.23 (82)	41.63 (1,058)
Average snowfall inches (cm)	5.0 (13)	4.8 (12)	1.1 (2.8)	trace	0.0 (0.0)	0.0 (0.0)	0.0 (0.0)	0.0 (0.0)	0.0 (0.0)	trace	0.1 (0.25)	4.8 (12)	15.8 (40.05)
Average extreme snow depth inches (cm)	2 (5.1)	4 (10)	1 (2.5)	0 (0)	0 (0)	0 (0)	0 (0)	0 (0)	0 (0)	0 (0)	0 (0)	2 (5.1)	4 (10)
Average precipitation days (≥ 0.01 Inches)	10	8	11	11	12	10	10	8	8	9	11	11	119
Average snowy days (≥ 0.1 Inches)	4	3	1	0	0	0	0	0	0	0	0	3	11
Source: NOAA

== Demographics ==
Historical population
Census	Pop.	Note	%±
1870	310		—
1880	751		142.3%
1890	2,284		204.1%
1900	12,950		467.0%
1910	11,028		−14.8%
1920	10,790		−2.2%
1930	10,685		−1.0%
1940	10,913		2.1%
1950	11,362		4.1%
1960	11,793		3.8%
1970	11,196		−5.1%
1980	10,867		−2.9%
1990	9,494		−12.6%
2000	9,737		2.6%
2010	8,614		−11.5%
2020	8,410		−2.4%
2025 (est.)	8,469		0.7%
U.S. Decennial Census

=== 2020 census ===
As of the 2020 census, Elwood had a population of 8,410. The median age was 41.1 years. 23.2% of residents were under the age of 18 and 18.0% of residents were 65 years of age or older. For every 100 females there were 96.2 males, and for every 100 females age 18 and over there were 94.1 males age 18 and over.

99.8% of residents lived in urban areas, while 0.2% lived in rural areas.

There were 3,529 households in Elwood, of which 29.1% had children under the age of 18 living in them. Of all households, 39.5% were married-couple households, 21.3% were households with a male householder and no spouse or partner present, and 29.5% were households with a female householder and no spouse or partner present. About 31.4% of all households were made up of individuals and 13.9% had someone living alone who was 65 years of age or older.

There were 4,067 housing units, of which 13.2% were vacant. The homeowner vacancy rate was 3.9% and the rental vacancy rate was 10.5%.

Racial composition as of the 2020 census
Race	Number	Percent
White	7,792	92.7%
Black or African American	14	0.2%
American Indian and Alaska Native	26	0.3%
Asian	43	0.5%
Native Hawaiian and Other Pacific Islander	10	0.1%
Some other race	112	1.3%
Two or more races	413	4.9%
Hispanic or Latino (of any race)	332	3.9%

=== 2010 census ===
As of the census of 2010, there were 8,614 people, 3,455 households, and 2,265 families living in the city. The population density was 2,284.9 inhabitants per square mile (882.2/km^{2}). There were 4,099 housing units at an average density of 1,087.3 per square mile (419.8/km^{2}). The racial makeup of the city was 96.7% White, 0.2% African American, 0.2% Native American, 0.3% Asian, 1.0% from other races, and 1.5% from two or more races. Hispanic or Latino of any race were 3.3% of the population.

There were 3,455 households, of which 33.1% had children under the age of 18 living with them, 44.8% were married couples living together, 14.8% had a female householder with no husband present, 6.0% had a male householder with no wife present, and 34.4% were non-families. 28.6% of all households were made up of individuals, and 12.5% had someone living alone who was 65 years of age or older. The average household size was 2.49 and the average family size was 3.02.

The median age in the city was 38.6 years. 25.2% of residents were under the age of 18; 8.5% were between the ages of 18 and 24; 24.1% were from 25 to 44; 28.1% were from 45 to 64; and 14.1% were 65 years of age or older. The gender makeup of the city was 48.7% male and 51.3% female.

=== 2000 census ===
As of the census of 2000, there were 9,737 people, 3,845 households, and 2,660 families living in the city. The population density was 2,743.1 inhabitants per square mile (1,059.1/km^{2}). There were 4,179 housing units at an average density of 1,177.3 per square mile (454.6/km^{2}). The racial makeup of the city was 98.33% White, 0.05% African American, 0.12% Native American, 0.25% Asian, 0.05% Pacific Islander, 0.68% from other races, and 0.52% from two or more races. Hispanic or Latino of any race were 1.64% of the population.

There were 3,845 households, out of which 32.7% had children under the age of 18 living with them, 52.9% were married couples living together, 11.9% had a female householder with no husband present, and 30.8% were non-families. 26.9% of all households were made up of individuals, and 12.1% had someone living alone who was 65 years of age or older. The average household size was 2.50 and the average family size was 3.00.

In the city, the population was spread out, with 26.3% under the age of 18, 7.9% from 18 to 24, 28.8% from 25 to 44, 22.3% from 45 to 64, and 14.8% who were 65 years of age or older. The median age was 37 years. For every 100 females, there were 94.2 males. For every 100 females age 18 and over, there were 90.5 males.

The median income for a household in the city was $30,986, and the median income for a family was $36,239. Males had a median income of $31,527 versus $19,947 for females. The per capita income for the city was $15,402. About 11.7% of families and 15.2% of the population were below the poverty line, including 21.0% of those under age 18 and 9.4% of those age 65 or over.

== Community and culture ==
The annual Glass Festival, held every third weekend of August, is one way in which the city tries to promote the area's history with natural gas and glass. In the years surrounding the turn of the century, Elwood, along with the nearby towns of Anderson and Gas City, were a common destination for Welsh immigrant families.

Elwood has a public library, a branch of the North Madison County Public Library System.

The Elwood Downtown Historic District was listed in the National Register of Historic Places in 2002.

== Education ==
It is in the Elwood Community School Corporation.

== Notable people ==
- David Canary, actor
- Jared Carter, poet
- Joseph Clancy, 24th director of the U.S. Secret Service
- James J. Davis, U.S. Secretary of Labor and U.S. senator from Pennsylvania
- Ryan Keene (aka "Fry Guy"), computer hacker
- Don Mellett, newspaper editor
- John Mengelt, professional athlete, NBA
- Philip Sharp, congressman from Indiana
- Ray Still, contemporary classical oboist
- Wallace D. Wattles, writer
- Edward Willkie, Olympic wrestler
- Wendell Willkie, 1940 Republican presidential candidate

== See also ==
- List of sundown towns in the United States
