= Sparta Township, Pennsylvania =

Township in Pennsylvania, US

Coordinates: 41°49′00″N 79°41′59″W

Sparta Township, Crawford County, Pennsylvania
- Township
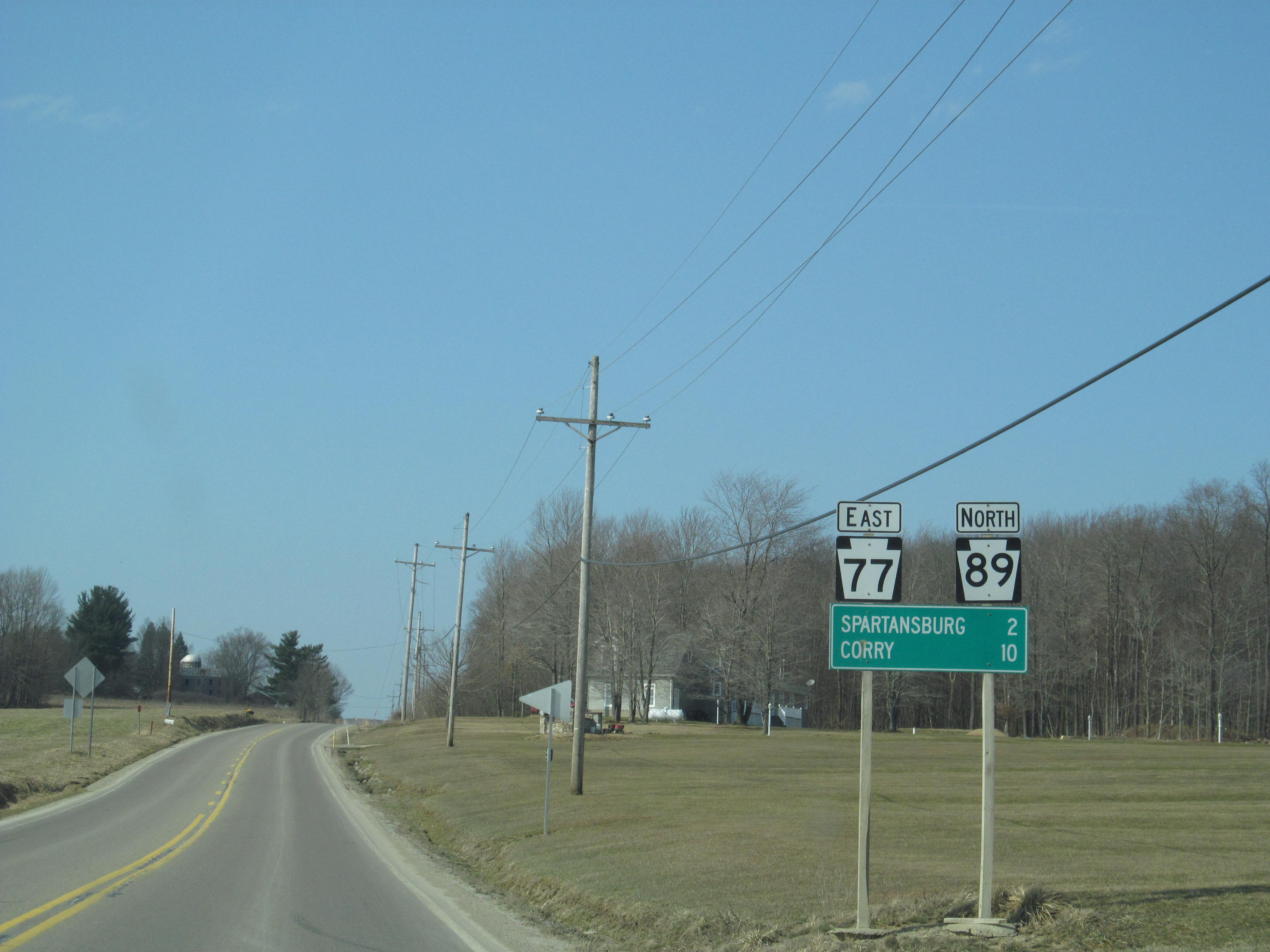
- Eastbound PA 77 and northbound PA 89 in Sparta Township

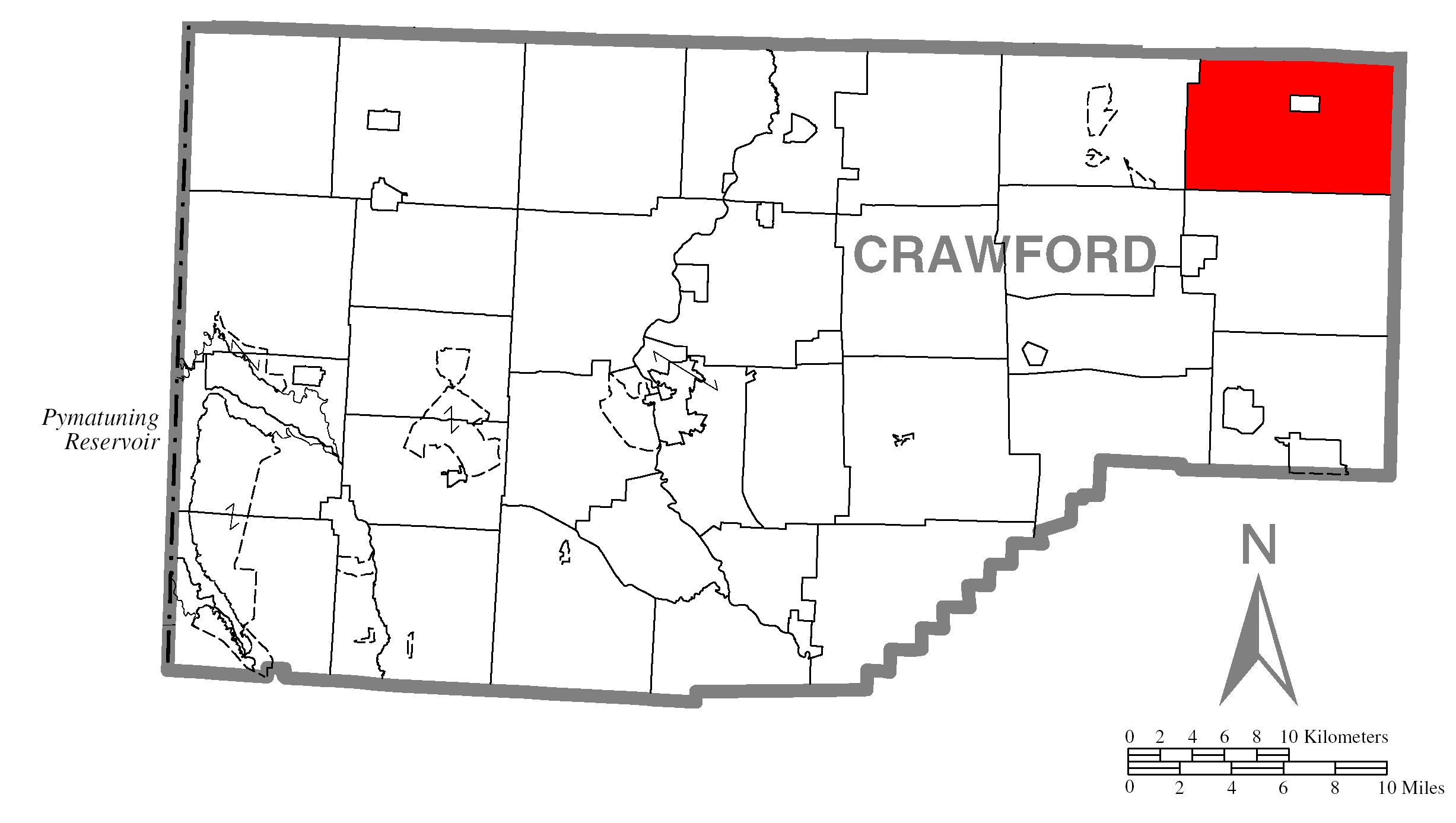
- Location of Sparta Township in Crawford County

- Location of Crawford County in Pennsylvania
- Country: United States
- State: Pennsylvania
- County: Crawford County

Area
  - Total: 42.00 sq mi (108.79 km^{2})
  - Land: 41.81 sq mi (108.30 km^{2})
  - Water: 0.19 sq mi (0.49 km^{2})
- Highest elevation (northeast part of township on Bennett Road): 1,910 ft (580 m)
  - Rank: highest point in Crawford County, Pennsylvania
- Lowest elevation (East Branch Oil Creek): 1,320 ft (400 m)

Population (2020)
  - Total: 1,914 ▲
  - Estimate (2024): 1,892
  - Density: 42.4/sq mi (16.39/km^{2})
- Time zone: UTC-4 (EST)
  - Summer (DST): UTC-5 (EDT)
- Area code: 814
- FIPS code: 42-039-72688

Sparta Township is a township in Crawford County, Pennsylvania, United States. The population was 1,914 at the 2020 census, up from 1,832 at the 2010 census. The Township surrounds Spartansburg, a borough of a few hundred people.

== Geography ==
The township is in the northeast corner of Crawford County, bordered to the north by Erie County and to the east by Warren County. The township surrounds the borough of Spartansburg, a separate municipality located northeast of the center of the township.

According to the United States Census Bureau, Sparta Township has a total area of 42.0 square miles (108.8 km^{2}), of which 41.8 square miles (108.3 km^{2}) is land and 0.2 square miles (0.5 km^{2}), or 0.45%, is water.

=== Natural features ===
The elevation of Sparta Township ranges from a low of 1,320 feet at East Branch of Oil Creek to 1,913 feet (also highest point in Crawford County) in the northeastern part of the township. Eastman Hill, in the eastern part of the township, is the most prominent ridge in the township. Tributaries of Oil Creek, such as Stranahan Run, Patrick Run, Coon Run, Britton Run, Twomile Creek, and Fivemile Creek, drain most of the township, with a small portion in the northeastern part being drained by Brokenstraw Creek tributaries. Wetlands in the county are mostly clustered around Clear Lake, with smaller amounts along Fish Flats at Fivemile Creek and an area in the southeastern part of the township.

== Demographics ==
Historical population
Census	Pop.	Note	%±
2000	1,740		—
2010	1,832		5.3%
2020	1,914		4.5%
2024 (est.)	1,892		−1.1%
U.S. Decennial Census

As of the census of 2000, there were 1,740 people, 485 households, and 408 families residing in the township. The population density was 41.5 inhabitants per square mile (16.0/km^{2}). There were 559 housing units at an average density of 13.3/sq mi (5.1/km^{2}). The racial makeup of the township was 99.20% White, 0.29% African American, and 0.52% from two or more races. Hispanic or Latino of any race were 0.29% of the population.

There were 485 households, out of which 43.7% had children under the age of 18 living with them, 76.1% were married couples living together, 4.1% had a female householder with no husband present, and 15.7% were non-families. 14.4% of all households were made up of individuals, and 6.0% had someone living alone who was 65 years of age or older. The average household size was 3.58 and the average family size was 3.97.

In the township, the population was spread out, with 39.3% under the age of 18, 9.9% from 18 to 24, 25.9% from 25 to 44, 15.7% from 45 to 64, and 9.2% who were 65 years of age or older. The median age was 26 years. For every 100 females, there were 113.0 males. For every 100 females age 18 and over, there were 108.3 males.

The median income for a household in the township was $31,063, and the median income for a family was $32,264. Males had a median income of $26,094 versus $18,594 for females. The per capita income for the township was $10,998. About 14.2% of families and 19.8% of the population were below the poverty line, including 28.7% of those under age 18 and 7.7% of those aged 65 or over.
