= Rome Township, Crawford County, Pennsylvania =

Township in Pennsylvania, US

Coordinates: 41°43′00″N 79°36′59″W

- Township
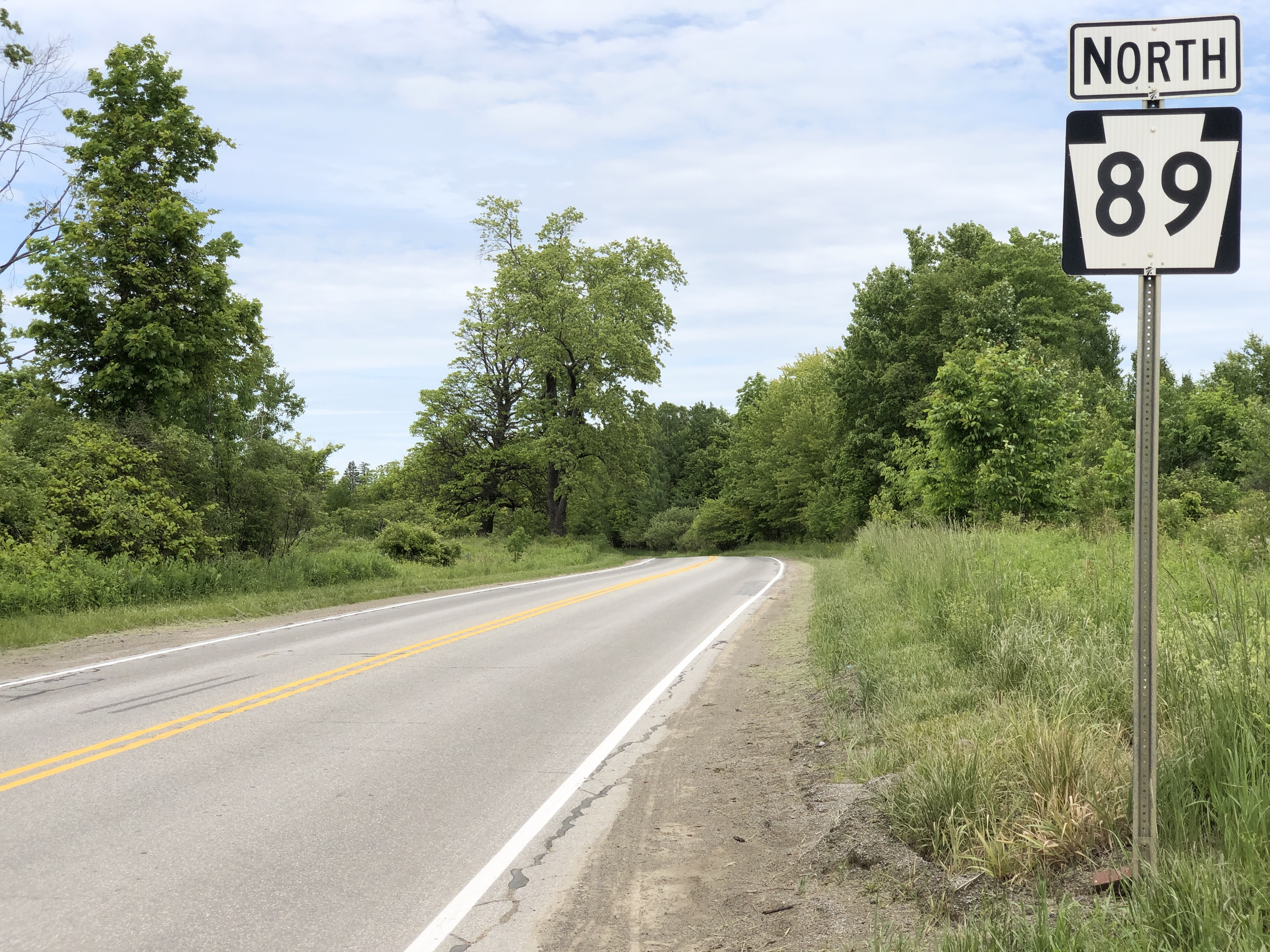
- PA 89 in Rome Township

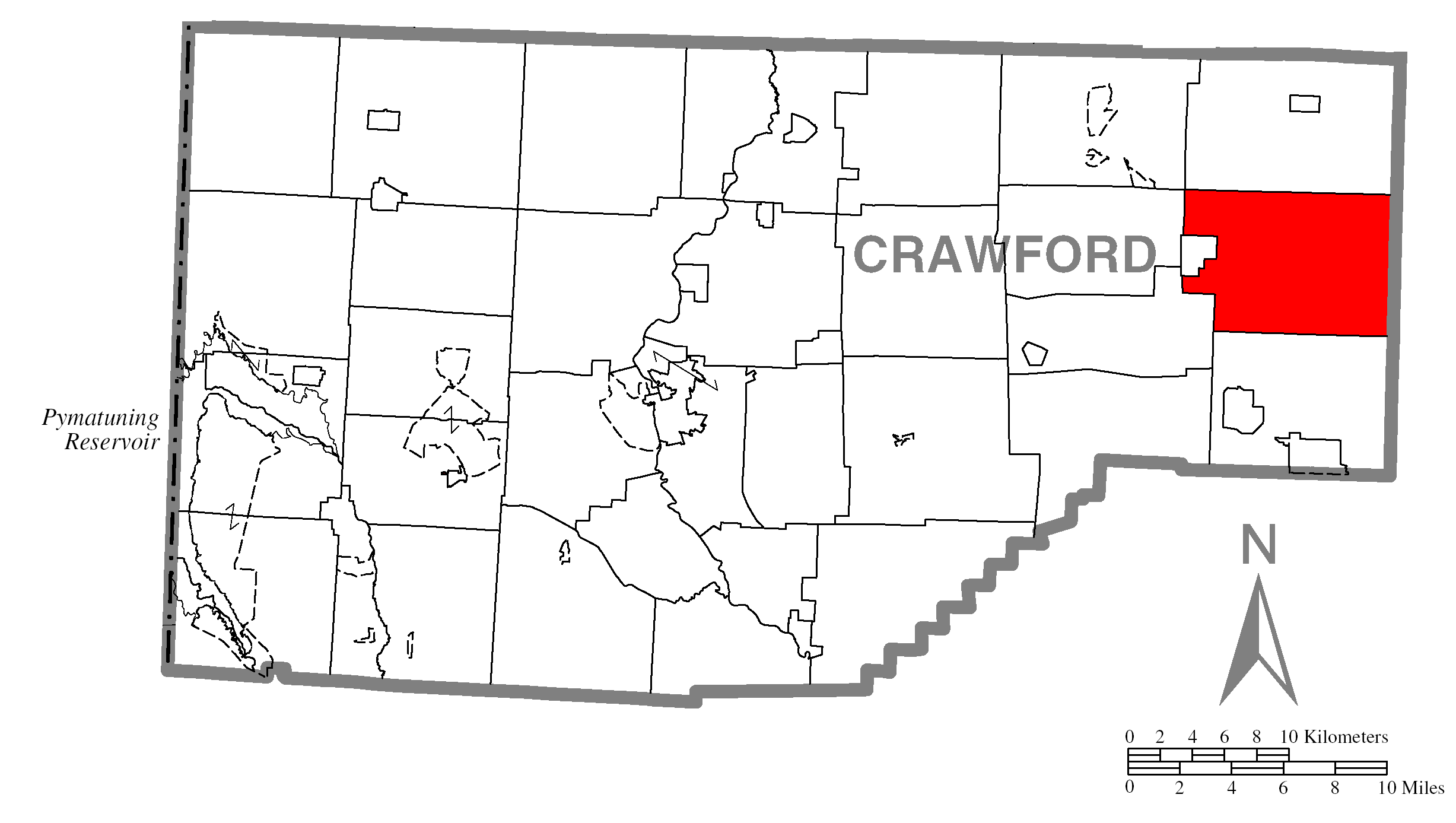
- Location of Rome Township in Crawford County

- Location of Crawford County in Pennsylvania
- Country: United States
- State: Pennsylvania
- County: Crawford County

Area
  - Total: 41.34 sq mi (107.07 km^{2})
  - Land: 41.34 sq mi (107.07 km^{2})
  - Water: 0 sq mi (0.00 km^{2})
- Highest elevation (east of Buell Corners): 1,790 ft (550 m)
- Lowest elevation (Oil Creek): 1,260 ft (380 m)

Population (2020)
  - Total: 1,995 ▲
  - Estimate (2024): 1,948
  - Density: 43.3/sq mi (16.73/km^{2})
- Time zone: UTC-4 (EST)
  - Summer (DST): UTC-5 (EDT)
- Area code: 814
- FIPS code: 42-039-65960

Rome Township is a township in Crawford County, Pennsylvania, United States. The population was 1,995 at the 2020 census, up from 1,840 at the 2010 census.

== Geography ==
Rome Township is in eastern Crawford County, bordered by Warren County to the east. The borough of Centerville is along the western edge of the township. According to the United States Census Bureau, the township has a total area of 41.4 square miles (107.1 km^{2}), all land.

=== Natural features ===
Rome Township is located in the southeastern part of Crawford County in the Northwestern Glaciated Plateau of Pennsylvania. The township is drained by Oil Creek, a southward-flowing tributary of the Allegheny River, and two tributaries to Oil Creek, East Branch Oil Creek, and tributaries of Thompson Creek. Tributaries to East Branch Oil Creek include Britton Run, Coon Run, Twomile Creek, and Fivemile Creek. Tributaries to Thompson Creek include McLaughlin Creek, Shirley Run and its tributary Dolly Run, and Hummer Creek. The lowest elevation of Rome Township is 1,260 ft (380 m), where Oil Creek flows out of the township north of Tryonville Station. The highest elevation is 1,790 ft (550 m) is located near Buells Corners, Pennsylvania.

== Demographics ==
Historical population
Census	Pop.	Note	%±
2000	1,745		—
2010	1,840		5.4%
2020	1,995		8.4%
2024 (est.)	1,948		−2.4%
U.S. Decennial Census

As of the census of 2000, there were 1,745 people, 532 households, and 422 families residing in the township. The population density was 42.3 inhabitants per square mile (16.3/km^{2}). There were 618 housing units at an average density of 15.0/sq mi (5.8/km^{2}). The racial makeup of the township was 99.20% White, 0.06% African American, 0.34% Native American, 0.06% from other races, and 0.34% from two or more races. Hispanic or Latino of any race were 0.23% of the population.

There were 532 households, out of which 44.0% had children under the age of 18 living with them, 69.5% were married couples living together, 6.6% had a female householder with no husband present, and 20.5% were non-families. 17.9% of all households were made up of individuals, and 6.8% had someone living alone who was 65 years of age or older. The average household size was 3.28 and the average family size was 3.78.

In the township the population was spread out, with 38.6% under the age of 18, 9.0% from 18 to 24, 24.6% from 25 to 44, 19.3% from 45 to 64, and 8.5% who were 65 years of age or older. The median age was 27 years. For every 100 females, there were 108.0 males. For every 100 females age 18 and over, there were 104.0 males.

The median income for a household in the township was $29,239, and the median income for a family was $33,942. Males had a median income of $29,167 versus $20,000 for females. The per capita income for the township was $12,035. About 14.0% of families and 19.5% of the population were below the poverty line, including 24.5% of those under age 18 and 17.8% of those age 65 or over.
