= Twomile Creek (East Branch Oil Creek tributary) =

Twomile Creek Tributary to East Branch Oil Creek
- Location within Pennsylvania Location within the United States

Location
- Country: United States
- State: Pennsylvania
- County: Crawford
- Township: Rome; Sparta
- Borough: Centerville

Physical characteristics
- Source: divide between Twomile Creek and Britton Run
  - location: about 0.75 miles southwest of Britton Run, Pennsylvania
  - coordinates: 41°47′31″N 079°45′50″W
  - elevation: 1,555 ft (474 m)
- Mouth: East Branch Oil Creek
  - location: Centerville, Pennsylvania
  - coordinates: 41°44′43″N 079°45′27″W
  - elevation: 1,283 ft (391 m)
- Length: 3.72 mi (5.99 km)
- Basin size: 3.58 square miles (9.3 km^{2})
- Discharge
  - location: East Branch Oil Creek
  - average: 6.85 cu ft/s (0.194 m^{3}/s) at mouth with East Branch Oil Creek

Basin features
- Progression: East Branch Oil Creek → Oil Creek → Allegheny River → Ohio River → Mississippi River → Gulf of Mexico
- River system: Allegheny River (Oil Creek)
- Tributaries
  - left: unnamed tributaries
  - right: unnamed tributaries
- Bridges: PA 77, Kunick Road, Brimstone Road

Twomile Creek is a 3.72 mi (5.99 km) long 2nd order tributary to East Branch Oil Creek in Crawford County, Pennsylvania.

== Course ==
Twomile Creek rises on the Britton Run divide about 0.75 miles southwest of Britton Run, Pennsylvania. Twomile Creek then flows south through the Erie Drift Plain to East Branch Oil Creek at Centerville, Pennsylvania.

== Watershed ==
Twomile Creek drains 3.58 square miles (9.3 km^{2}) of area, receives about 45.4 in/year of precipitation, has a topographic wetness index of 459.72 and is about 50% forested.

== Additional Maps ==
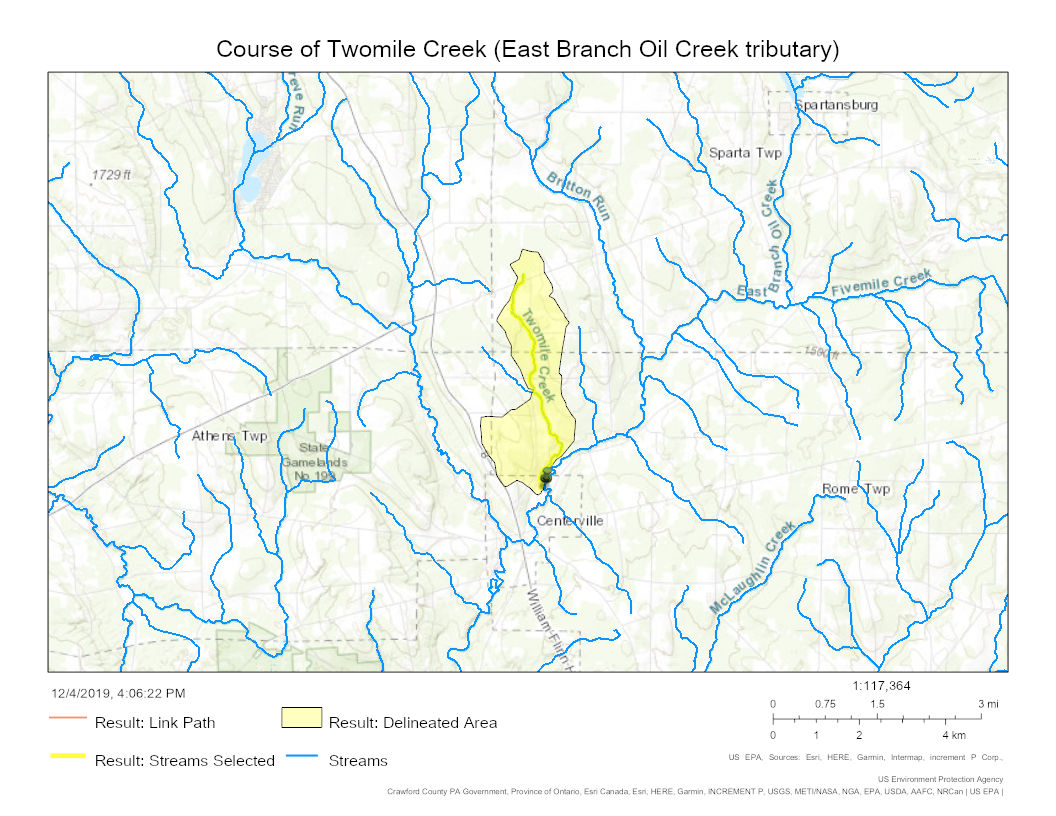
Course of Twomile Creek (East Branch Oil Creek)

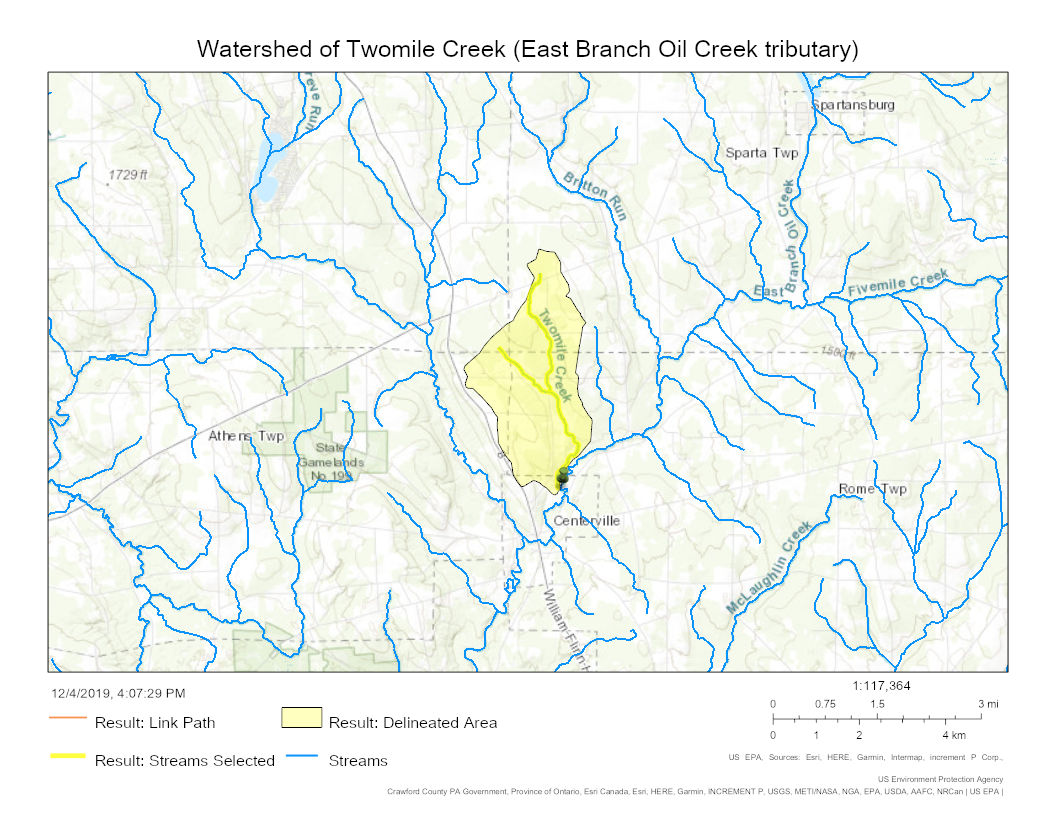
Watershed of Twomile Creek (East Branch Oil Creek tributary)
