= Brannon Run (East Branch Oil Creek tributary) =

Brannon Run Tributary to East Branch Oil Creek
- Location within Pennsylvania Location within the United States

Location
- Country: United States
- State: Pennsylvania
- County: Crawford
- Township: Rome

Physical characteristics
- Source: divide between Brannon Run and McLaughlin Creek
  - location: about 2 miles east of Centerville, Pennsylvania
  - coordinates: 41°43′53″N 079°42′03″W
  - elevation: 1,490 ft (450 m)
- Mouth: East Branch Oil Creek
  - location: about 1.5 miles northeast of Centerville, Pennsylvania
  - coordinates: 41°45′25″N 079°44′00″W
  - elevation: 1,299 ft (396 m)
- Length: 2.56 mi (4.12 km)
- Basin size: 3.11 square miles (8.1 km^{2})
- Discharge
  - location: East Branch Oil Creek
  - average: 6.03 cu ft/s (0.171 m^{3}/s) at mouth with East Branch Oil Creek

Basin features
- Progression: East Branch Oil Creek → Oil Creek → Allegheny River → Ohio River → Mississippi River → Gulf of Mexico
- River system: Allegheny River (Oil Creek)
- Tributaries
  - left: unnamed tributaries
  - right: unnamed tributaries
- Bridges: Fink Road, Buells Corners Road, Fish Flats Road

Brannon Run is a 2.56 mi (4.12 km) long tributary to East Branch Oil Creek in Crawford County, Pennsylvania.

== Course ==
Brannon Run rises on the McLaughlin Creek divide about 2 miles east of Centerville, Pennsylvania. Brannon Run then flows northwest through the Erie Drift Plain to East Branch Oil Creek about 1.5 miles northeast of Centerville.

== Watershed ==
Brannon Run drains 3.11 square miles (8.1 km^{2}) of area, receives about 45.4 in/year of precipitation, has a topographic wetness index of 436.55 and is about 60% forested.

== Additional Maps ==
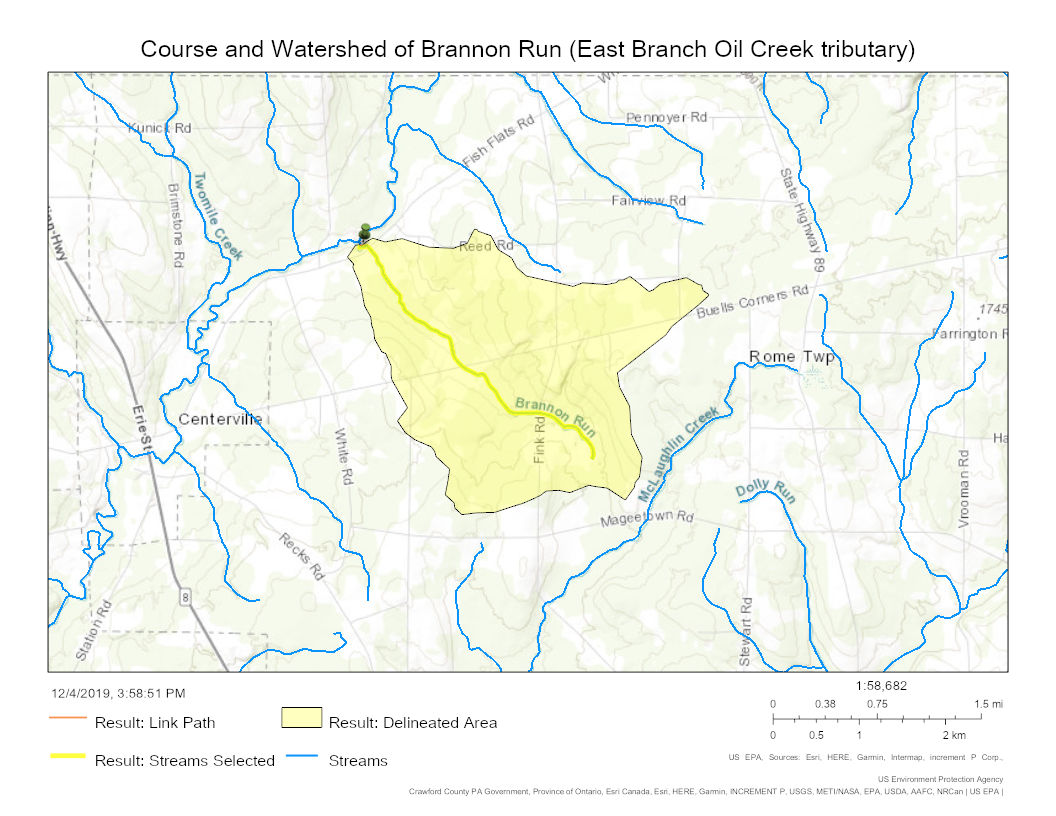
Brannon Run (East Branch Oil Creek tributary)
