= Murder of Rebekah Byler =

2024 death in Pennsylvania, US

- Date: February 26, 2024
- Location: Sparta Township, Crawford County, Pennsylvania, U.S.
- Perpetrator: Shawn Cranston
- Deaths: 2 (Byler and her unborn child)

On February 26, 2024, Rebekah A. Byler, a 23-year-old Amish woman, was murdered in her home near Spartansburg, Pennsylvania, by Shawn Cranston of Corry, Pennsylvania. Cranston was arrested four days after the murder, going on trial in June 2025. He was found guilty on burglary, trespassing, and two counts of homicide: one for Byler, and the other for her unborn child.

== Event ==
Byler's husband, Andy Byler, left the house in the morning with a neighbor, leaving Rebekah Byler, who was six months pregnant, with her two young children.

Upon Andy Byler's return home around lunch time, he and a family friend found Rebekah unresponsive in the living room. Police who arrived on the scene after the family friend called 911 noted Rebekah Byler had lacerations on her neck and head. Byler's son and daughter, aged two and three, were unharmed. Byler's son later told police that "a man wearing sneakers" had killed Rebekah.

== Investigation and trial ==
Police initially had no suspects in the killing and asked the public for leads. They did not initially release details of Byler's death.

On the evening of March 1, police arrested Shawn Cranston and launched a search of his home in Corry, Pennsylvania, about 8 miles (13 km) from the Byler home, which continued into the morning of March 2. Cranston was arrested and charged with two counts of homicide, for the deaths of Rebekah and her fetus, as well as counts for burglary and trespassing. He was held in Crawford County Correctional Facility after his arrest. In late March, authorities seized sneakers and six guns and ammunition from Cranston's home.

A preliminary hearing was held on March 15. A trial was initially scheduled for November 2024, but was delayed to March 2025. In February 2025, the Pennsylvania Attorney General’s Office took over prosecution of Cranston due to staffing shortages in the Crawford County District Attorney's office.

Cranston's trial was held at the Crawford County Judicial Center beginning on June 9, 2025. On June 12, 2025, a jury deliberated for less than three hours. Cranston was found guilty on all counts. He was sentenced on July 28, 2025, receiving two life sentences for each count of homicide. He also received time for burglary and criminal trespassing.

== Reactions ==
Community members set up a GoFundMe to raise money for Rebekah Byler's funeral and a new home for her husband and children.
