= Coon Run (East Branch Oil Creek tributary) =

Coon Run Tributary to East Branch Oil Creek
- Location within Pennsylvania Location within the United States

Location
- Country: United States
- State: Pennsylvania
- County: Crawford
- Township: Rome; Sparta

Physical characteristics
- Source: divide between Coon Run and Brannon Run
  - location: about 2 miles southeast of Glynden, Pennsylvania
  - coordinates: 41°45′32″N 079°41′04″W
  - elevation: 1,650 ft (500 m)
- Mouth: East Branch Oil Creek
  - location: Glynden, Pennsylvania
  - coordinates: 41°46′41″N 079°43′13″W
  - elevation: 1,322 ft (403 m)
- Length: 2.35 mi (3.78 km)
- Basin size: 1.24 square miles (3.2 km^{2})
- Discharge
  - location: East Branch Oil Creek
  - average: 2.49 cu ft/s (0.071 m^{3}/s) at mouth with East Branch Oil Creek

Basin features
- Progression: East Branch Oil Creek → Oil Creek → Allegheny River → Ohio River → Mississippi River → Gulf of Mexico
- River system: Allegheny River (Oil Creek)
- Tributaries
  - left: unnamed tributaries
  - right: unnamed tributaries
- Bridges: Koon Road, Fairview Road, Whitney Road, Fish Flats Road, Glynden Road, Grade Road

Coon Run is a 2.35 mi (3.78 km) long tributary to East Branch Oil Creek in Crawford County, Pennsylvania.

== Course ==
Coon Run rises on the Brannon Run divide about 2 miles southeast of Glynden, Pennsylvania. Coon Run then flows northwest through the Erie Drift Plain to East Branch Oil Creek at Glynden.

== Watershed ==
Coon Run drains 1.24 square miles (3.2 km^{2}) of area, receives about 45.5 in/year of precipitation, has a topographic wetness index of 457.66 and is about 57% forested.

== Additional Maps ==
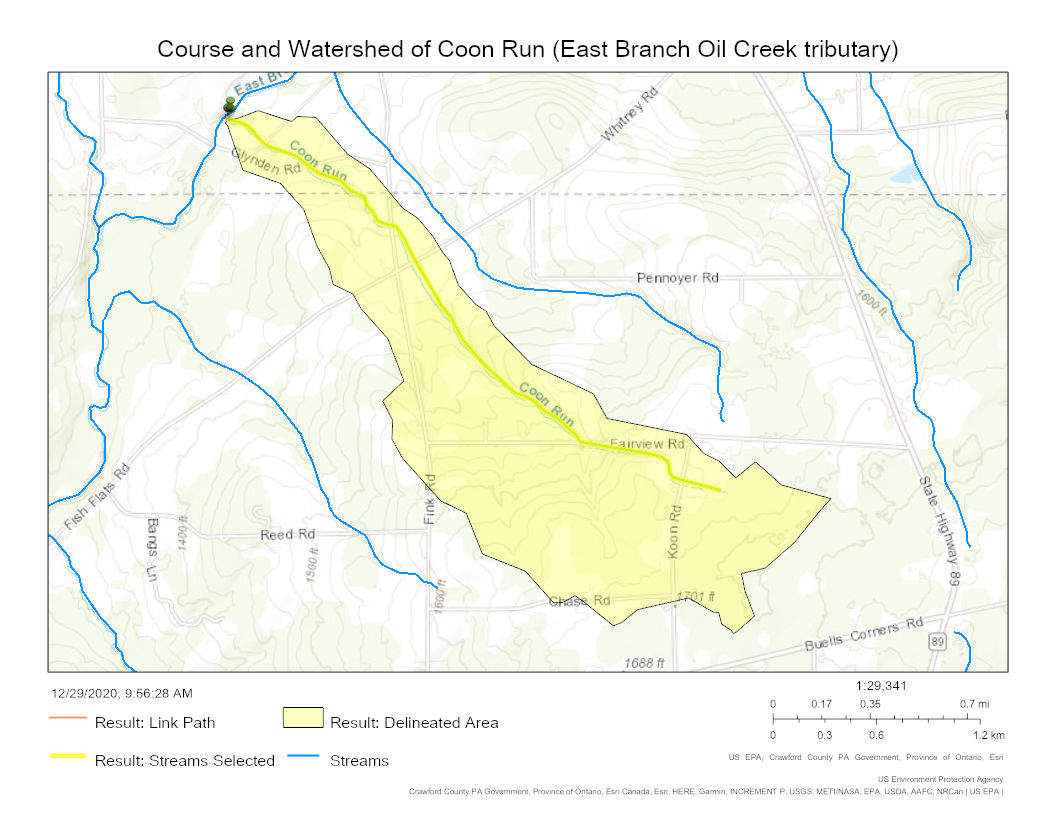
Course and Watershed of Coon Run (East Branch Oil Creek tributary) in Crawford County, Pennsylvania
