= Rome Township, Pennsylvania =

Rome Township is the name of some places in the U.S. state of Pennsylvania:

- Rome Township, Bradford County, Pennsylvania
- Rome Township, Crawford County, Pennsylvania
