= Dolly Run (Shirley Run tributary) =

Stream in Pennsylvania, USA

Dolly Run Tributary to Shirley Run
- Location of Dolly Run mouth Dolly Run (Shirley Run tributary) (the United States)

Location
- Country: United States
- State: Pennsylvania
- County: Crawford

Physical characteristics
- Source: McLaughlin Creek divide
  - location: about 0.5 miles west of Rendalls Corners, Pennsylvania
  - coordinates: 41°43′48″N 079°40′57″W
  - elevation: 1,625 ft (495 m)
- Mouth: Shirley Run
  - location: Cloverdale Corners, Pennsylvania
  - coordinates: 41°42′29″N 079°39′45″W
  - elevation: 1,438 ft (438 m)
- Length: 2.03 mi (3.27 km)
- Basin size: 1.92 square miles (5.0 km^{2})
- Discharge
  - location: Shirley Run
  - average: 3.90 cu ft/s (0.110 m^{3}/s) at mouth with Shirley Run

Basin features
- Progression: south-southeast
- River system: Allegheny River
- Tributaries
  - left: unnamed tributaries
  - right: unnamed tributaries
- Bridges: Stewart Road, PA 89

Dolly Run is a 2.03 mi (3.27 km) long 2nd order tributary to Shirley Run in Crawford County, Pennsylvania.

== Variant names ==
According to the Geographic Names Information System, Dolly Run has also been known historically as:

- Daffy Run

== Course ==
Dolly Run rises about 0.5 miles west of Rendalls Corners, Pennsylvania, and then flows south-southeast to join Shirley Run at Cloverdale Corners.

== Watershed ==
Dolly Run drains 1.92 square miles (5.0 km^{2}) of area, receives about 45.6 in/year of precipitation, has a wetness index of 438.49, and is about 46% forested.

== See also ==
- List of rivers of Pennsylvania
