= Spartansburg, Pennsylvania =

Borough in Pennsylvania, US

- Borough
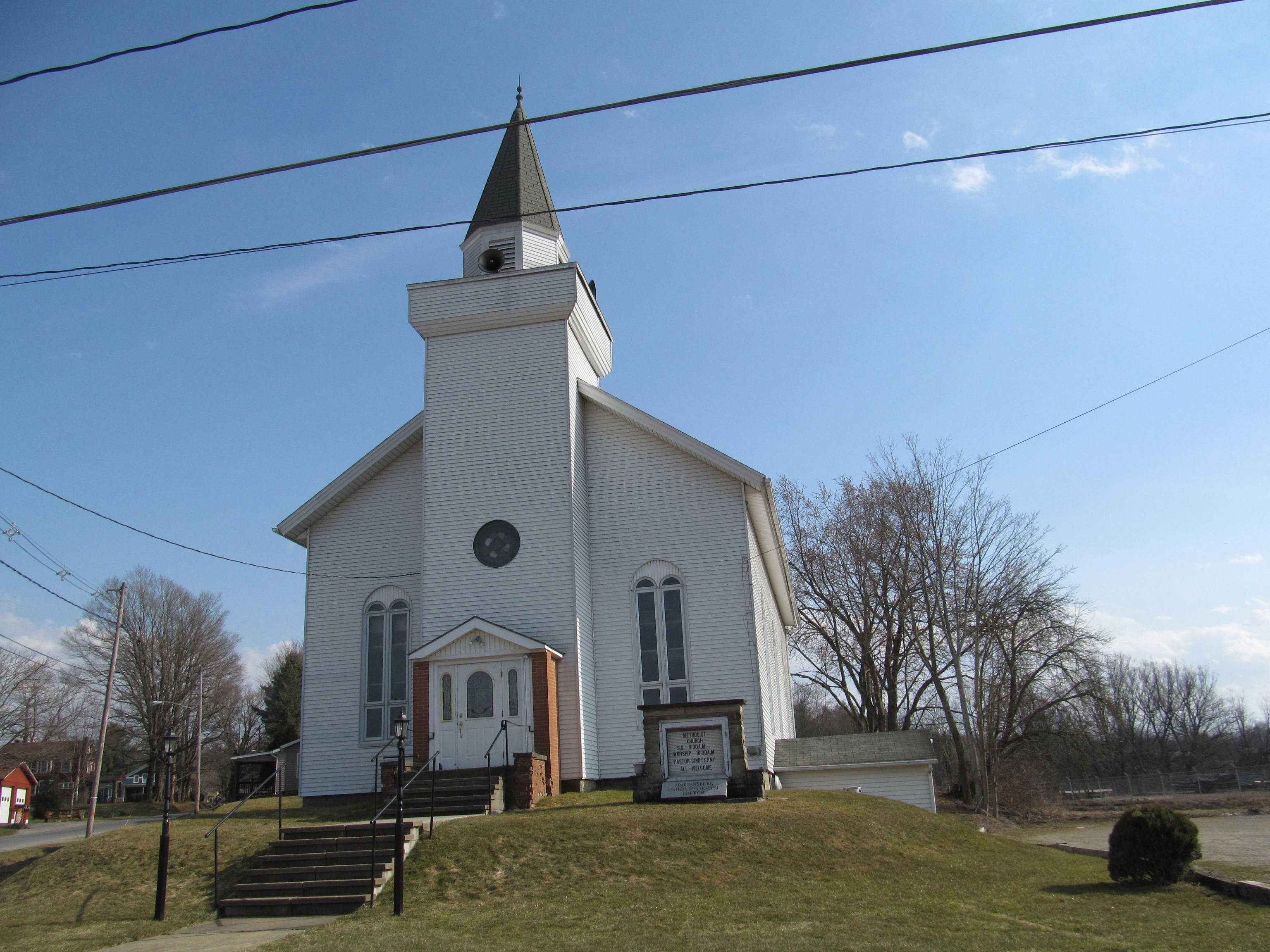
- Methodist church on Main Street

- Location of Spartansburg in Crawford County, Pennsylvania.

- Location of Spartansburg in Pennsylvania Location of Spartansburg in the United States
- Coordinates: 41°49′26″N 79°41′1″W
- Country: United States
- State: Pennsylvania
- County: Crawford County
- Founded: 1830

Government
  - Mayor: Ann Louise Wagner

Area
  - Total: 0.69 sq mi (1.80 km^{2})
  - Land: 0.66 sq mi (1.72 km^{2})
  - Water: 0.031 sq mi (0.08 km^{2})
- Elevation (middle of borough): 1,450 ft (440 m)
- Highest elevation (southeast corner of borough): 1,640 ft (500 m)
- Lowest elevation (East Branch Oil Creek): 1,430 ft (440 m)

Population (2020)
  - Total: 277
  - Estimate (2022): 274
  - Density: 423.8/sq mi (163.62/km^{2})
- Time zone: UTC-4 (EST)
  - Summer (DST): UTC-5 (EDT)
- Area code: 814
- FIPS code: 42-72704

Spartansburg is a borough in Crawford County, in northwestern Pennsylvania, United States. The population was 277 at the 2020 census, down from 305 at the 2010 census.

== Geography ==
Spartansburg is located near the northeast corner of Crawford County at 41°49′19″N 79°41′9″W (41.821980, -79.685957). It is surrounded by Sparta Township, a separate municipality.

Route 77 passes through the center of the borough, leading northeast 8 miles (13 km) to Corry and southwest 28 miles (45 km) to Meadville, the Crawford County seat.

According to the United States Census Bureau, the borough has a total area of 0.71 square miles (1.83 km^{2}), of which 0.68 square miles (1.76 km^{2}) is land and 0.03 square miles (0.08 km^{2}), or 4.23%, is water.

=== Natural Features ===
Spartansburg Borough is located on the glaciated plateau of northwestern Pennsylvania. The borough is drained by East Branch Oil Creek, which begins at the outlet of Clear Lake, an impoundment of Patrick Run and Stranahan Run. The lowest elevation in Spartansburg is 1,430 ft (440 m) where East Branch Oil Creek flows south out of the borough. The highest elevation is 1,640 ft (500 m) at the southeastern corner of the borough.

== Demographics ==
Historical population
Census	Pop.	Note	%±
1860	235		—
1870	457		94.5%
1880	486		6.3%
1890	516		6.2%
1900	488		−5.4%
1910	460		−5.7%
1920	450		−2.2%
1930	374		−16.9%
1940	423		13.1%
1950	482		13.9%
1960	500		3.7%
1970	464		−7.2%
1980	403		−13.1%
1990	403		0.0%
2000	333		−17.4%
2010	305		−8.4%
2020	281		−7.9%
2022 (est.)	274	▼	−2.5%
U.S. Decennial Census

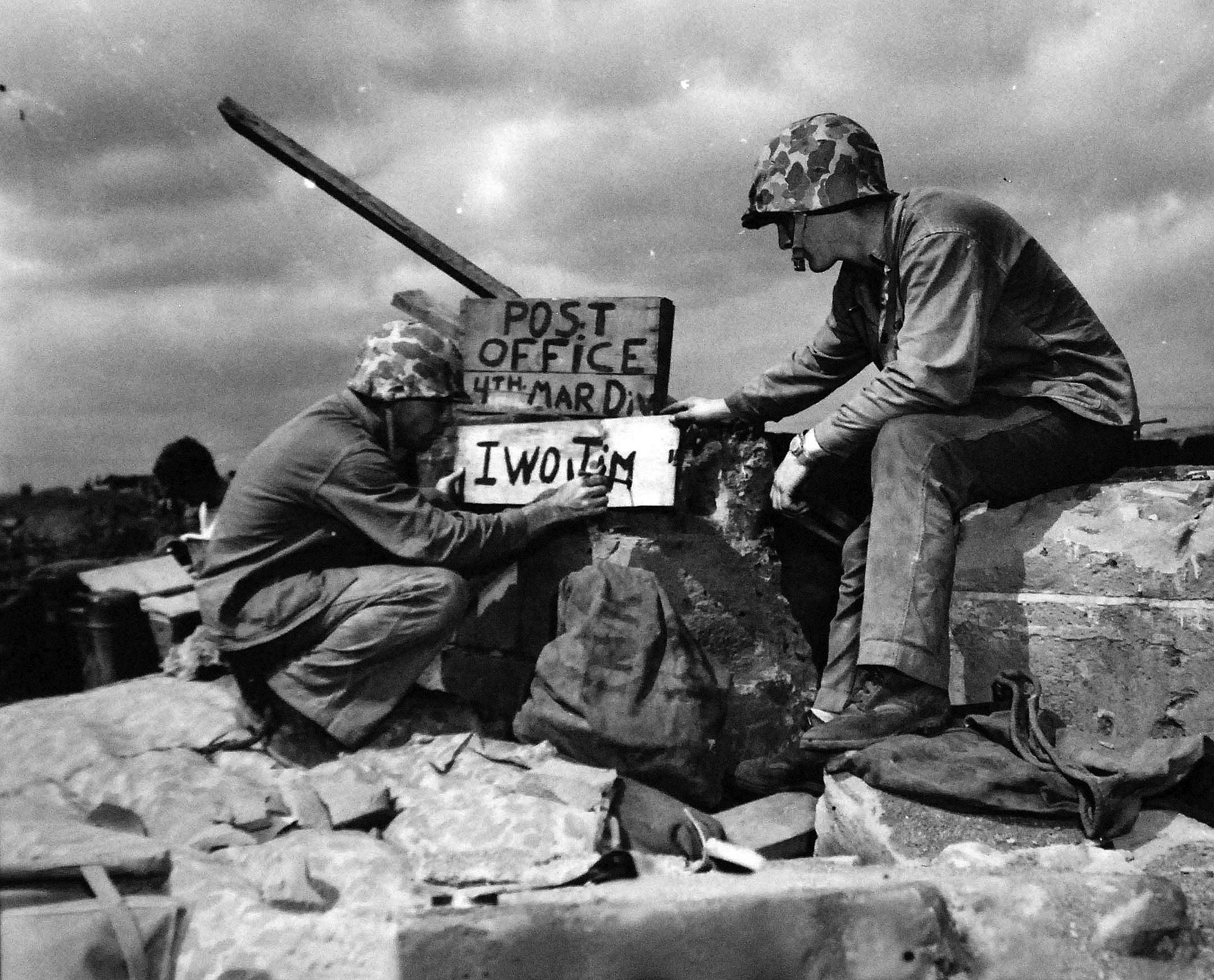
U.S. Marine Sgt. B.D. Boyant of Spartansburg (on the left), from the 4th Marine Division, sets up a post office on Iwo Jima in 1945.

As of the census of 2000, there were 333 people, 130 households, and 93 families residing in the borough. The population density was 499.1 inhabitants per square mile (192.7/km^{2}). There were 140 housing units at an average density of 209.8 per square mile (81.0/km^{2}). The racial makeup of the borough was 100.00% White.

There were 130 households, out of which 34.6% had children under the age of 18 living with them, 59.2% were married couples living together, 7.7% had a female householder with no husband present, and 27.7% were non-families. 26.9% of all households were made up of individuals, and 14.6% had someone living alone who was 65 years of age or older. The average household size was 2.56 and the average family size was 3.06.

In the borough the population was spread out, with 26.4% under the age of 18, 6.9% from 18 to 24, 26.1% from 25 to 44, 24.6% from 45 to 64, and 15.9% who were 65 years of age or older. The median age was 39 years. For every 100 females there were 89.2 males. For every 100 females age 18 and over, there were 88.5 males.

The median income for a household in the borough was $26,731, and the median income for a family was $34,063. Males had a median income of $33,750 versus $27,656 for females. The per capita income for the borough was $16,035. About 14.7% of families and 13.7% of the population were below the poverty line, including 18.2% of those under age 18 and 26.0% of those age 65 or over.

== Education ==
Spartansburg is served by the Corry Area School District. Schools include Corry Area Middle & High School.

== Notable people ==
- Ray Harroun, winner of the inaugural Indianapolis 500 in 1911.
- Rebekah Byler, Amish woman murdered in front of her home in Spartansburg.

== In popular culture ==
- Spartansburg appeared in the Discovery Channel show Dirty Jobs.
