= Fivemile Creek (East Branch Oil Creek tributary) =

Stream in Crawford County, Pennsylvania

Fivemile Creek Tributary to East Branch Oil Creek
- Location within Pennsylvania Location within the United States

Location
- Country: United States
- State: Pennsylvania
- County: Crawford
- Township: Rome; Sparta

Physical characteristics
- Source: divide between Fivemile Creek and Shirley Run
  - location: about 2 miles east-northeast of Buell Corners, Pennsylvania
  - coordinates: 41°45′55″N 079°37′48″W
  - elevation: 1,680 ft (510 m)
- Mouth: East Branch Oil Creek
  - location: about 3 miles northeast of Centerville, Pennsylvania
  - coordinates: 41°47′03″N 079°41′15″W
  - elevation: 1,348 ft (411 m)
- Length: 4.87 mi (7.84 km)
- Basin size: 10.75 square miles (27.8 km^{2})
- Discharge
  - location: East Branch Oil Creek
  - average: 20.86 cu ft/s (0.591 m^{3}/s) at mouth with East Branch Oil Creek

Basin features
- Progression: East Branch Oil Creek → Oil Creek → Allegheny River → Ohio River → Mississippi River → Gulf of Mexico
- River system: Allegheny River (Oil Creek)
- Tributaries
  - left: unnamed tributaries
  - right: unnamed tributaries
- Bridges: Hatchtown Road, PA 89

Fivemile Creek is a 4.87 mi (7.84 km) long tributary to East Branch Oil Creek in Crawford County, Pennsylvania.

== Course ==
Fivemile Creek rises on the Shirley Run divide about 2 miles east-northeast of Buell Corners, Pennsylvania. Fivemile Creek then flows north and then west through Fish Flats and the Erie Drift Plain to East Branch Oil Creek.

== Watershed ==
Fivemile Creek drains 10.75 square miles (27.8 km^{2}) of area, receives about 45.7 in/year of precipitation, has a topographic wetness index of 453.06 and is about 62% forested.

== Additional Maps ==
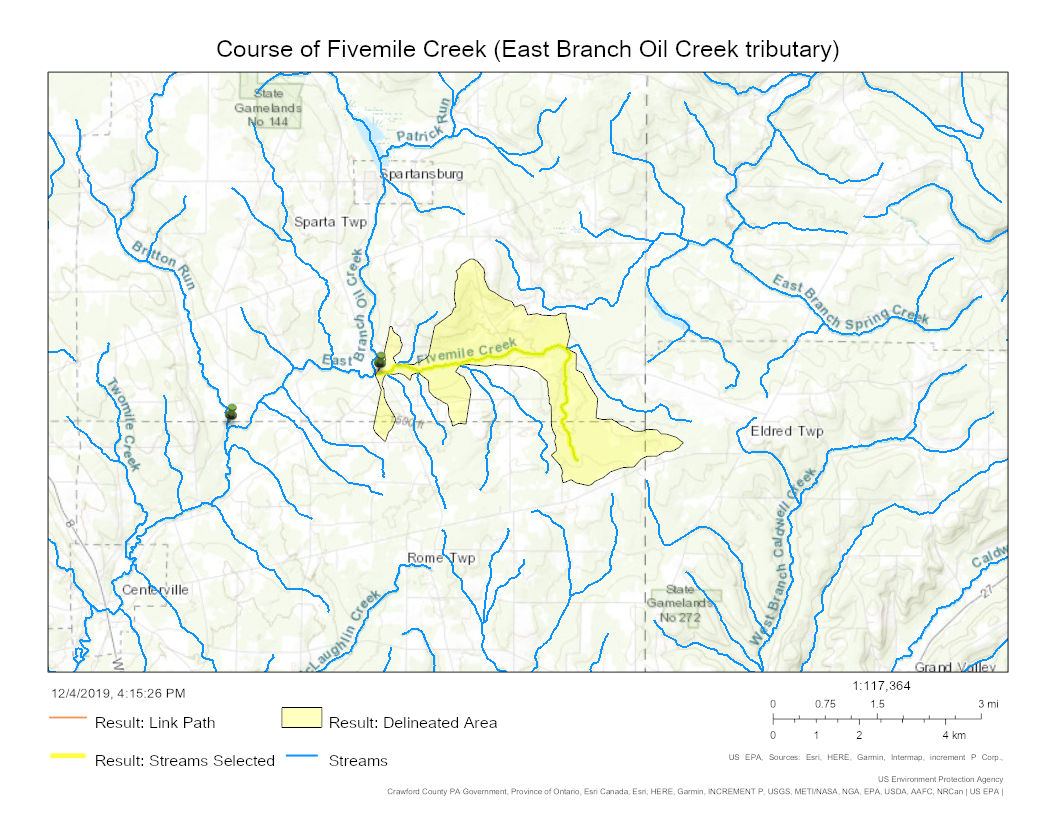
Course of Fivemile Creek (East Branch Oil Creek tributary)

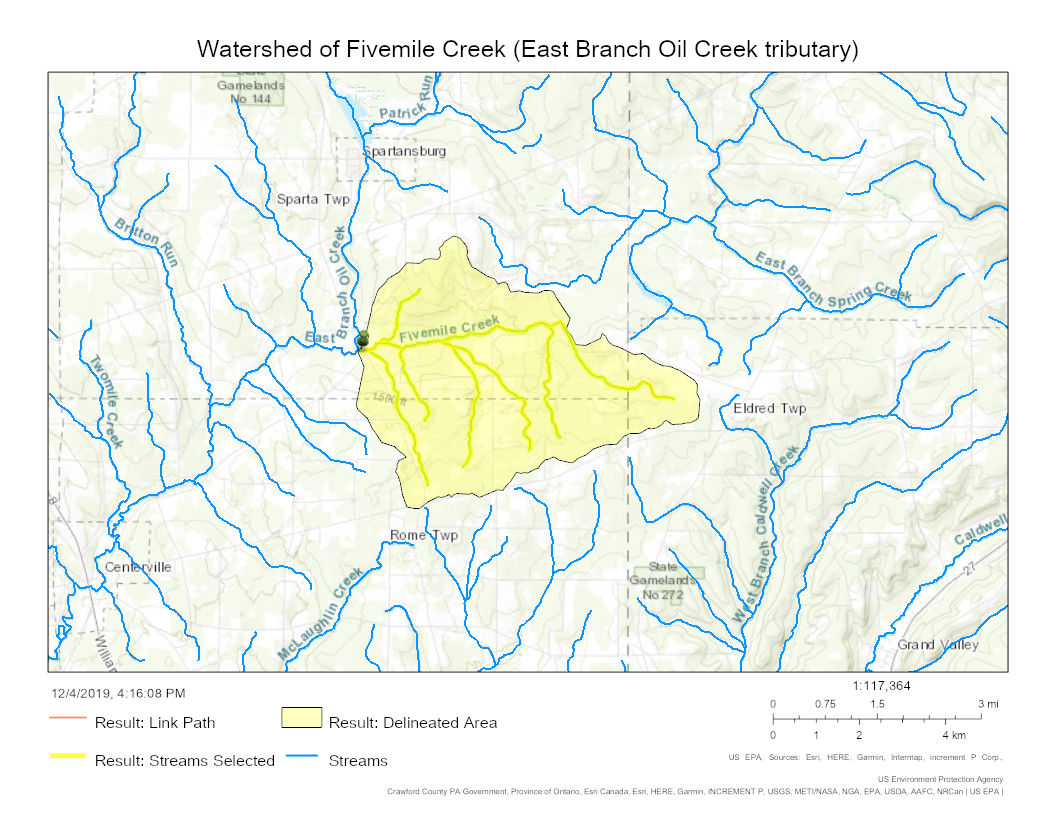
Watershed of Fivemile Creek (East Branch Oil Creek tributary)
