= Stranahan Run (East Branch Oil Creek tributary) =

Stranahan Run Tributary to East Branch Oil Creek
- Location within Pennsylvania Location within the United States

Location
- Country: United States
- State: Pennsylvania
- County: Crawford; Erie
- City: Spartansburg

Physical characteristics
- Source: divide between Stranahan Run, Britton Run and unnamed tributary to East Branch Oil Creek
  - location: about 1.5 miles northwest of Spartansburg, Pennsylvania in State Game Lands #144
  - coordinates: 41°50′25″N 079°40′06″W
  - elevation: 1,650 ft (500 m)
- Mouth: Clear Lake
  - location: Spartansburg, Pennsylvania
  - coordinates: 41°50′14″N 079°43′21″W
  - elevation: 1,441 ft (439 m)
- Length: 1.97 mi (3.17 km)
- Basin size: 3.04 square miles (7.9 km^{2})
- Discharge
  - location: Clear Lake at Spartansburg, Pennsylvania
  - average: 6.35 cu ft/s (0.180 m^{3}/s) at mouth with East Branch Oil Creek (Clear Lake)

Basin features
- Progression: East Branch Oil Creek → Oil Creek → Allegheny River → Ohio River → Mississippi River → Gulf of Mexico
- River system: Allegheny River (Oil Creek)
- Tributaries
  - left: unnamed tributaries
  - right: unnamed tributaries
- Waterbodies: Clear Lake
- Bridges: intersection of Earnest Road, PA 89

Stranahan Run is a 1.97 mi (3.17 km) long tributary to East Branch Oil Creek in Crawford County, Pennsylvania.

== Course ==
Stranahan Run rises on the Britton Run divide about 1.5 miles northwest of Spartansburg, Pennsylvania. Stranahan Run then flows northeast and southeast through the Erie Drift Plain to Clear Lake, in Spartansburg, Pennsylvania where it joins East Branch Oil Creek.

== Watershed ==
Stranahan Run drains 3.04 square miles (7.9 km^{2}) of area, receives about 46.8 in/year of precipitation, has a topographic wetness index of 478.58 and is about 47% forested.

== Additional Maps ==
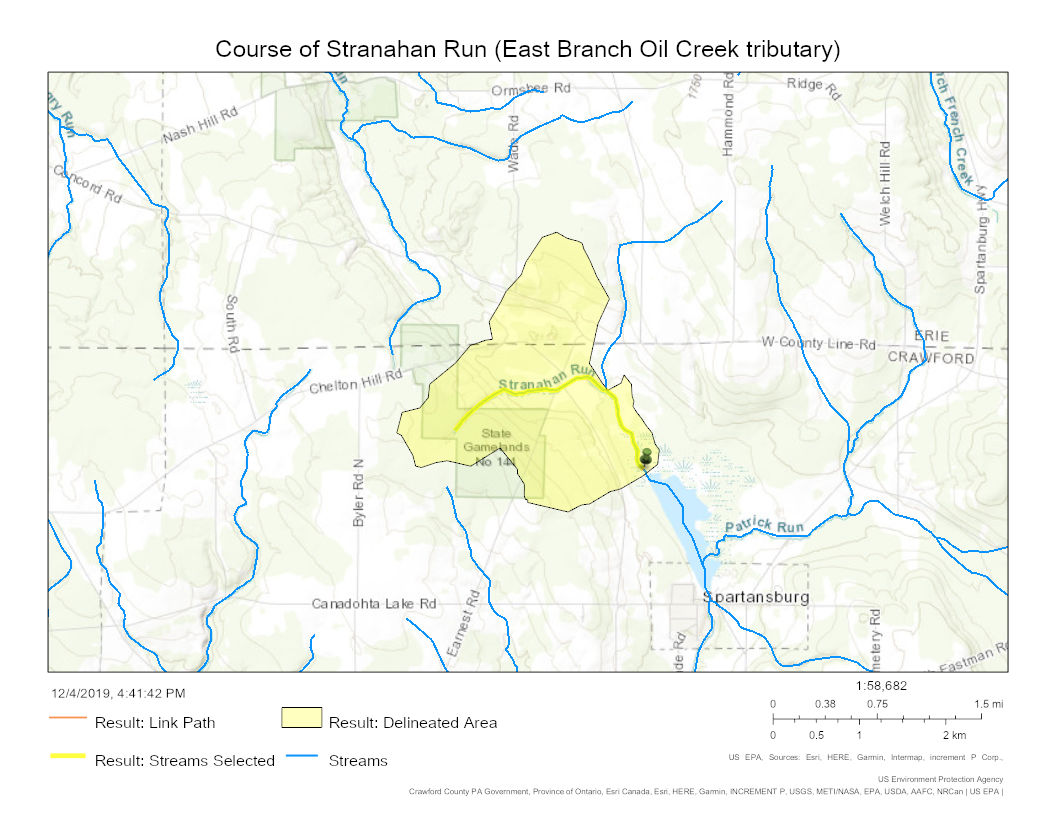
Course of Stranahan Run (East Branch Oil Creek tributary)

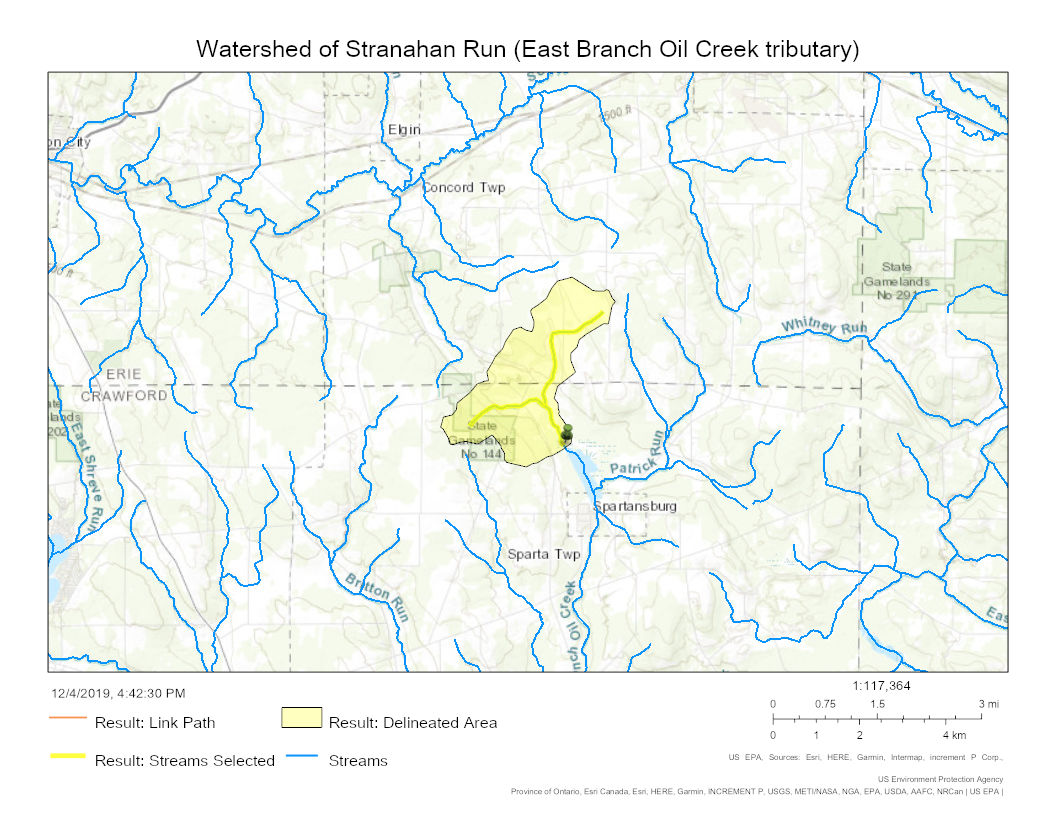
Watershed of Stranahan Run (East Branch Oil Creek tributary)
