= Patrick Run =

River in Crawford County, Pennsylvania

Patrick Run Tributary to East Branch Oil Creek
- Location within Pennsylvania Location within the United States

Location
- Country: United States
- State: Pennsylvania
- County: Crawford; Erie
- City: Spartansburg

Physical characteristics
- Source: divide between Patrick Run and South Branch French Creek
  - location: about 2 miles northeast of Spartansburg, Pennsylvania
  - coordinates: 41°49′46″N 079°40′06″W
  - elevation: 1,752 ft (534 m)
- Mouth: Clear Lake
  - location: Spartansburg, Pennsylvania
  - coordinates: 41°51′59″N 079°40′06″W
  - elevation: 1,441 ft (439 m)
- Length: 2.20 mi (3.54 km)
- Basin size: 2.24 square miles (5.8 km^{2})
- Discharge
  - location: Clear Lake at Spartansburg, Pennsylvania
  - average: 4.78 cu ft/s (0.135 m^{3}/s) at mouth with East Branch Oil Creek (Clear Lake)

Basin features
- Progression: East Branch Oil Creek → Oil Creek → Allegheny River → Ohio River → Mississippi River → Gulf of Mexico
- River system: Allegheny River (Oil Creek)
- Tributaries
  - left: unnamed tributaries
  - right: unnamed tributaries
- Waterbodies: Clear Lake
- Bridges: Welch Hill Road, E County Line Road, Welch Hill Road

Patrick Run is a 2.20 mi (3.54 km) long tributary to East Branch Oil Creek in Crawford County, Pennsylvania.

== Course ==
Patrick Run rises on the South Branch French Creek divide about 2 miles northeast of Spartansburg, Pennsylvania. Patrick Run then flows southeast and southwest through the Erie Drift Plain to Clear Lake, in Spartansburg, Pennsylvania where it joins East Branch Oil Creek.

== Watershed ==
Patrick Run drains 2.24 square miles (5.8 km^{2}) of area, receives about 47.0 in/year of precipitation, has a topographic wetness index of 440.74 and is about 42% forested.

== Additional Maps ==
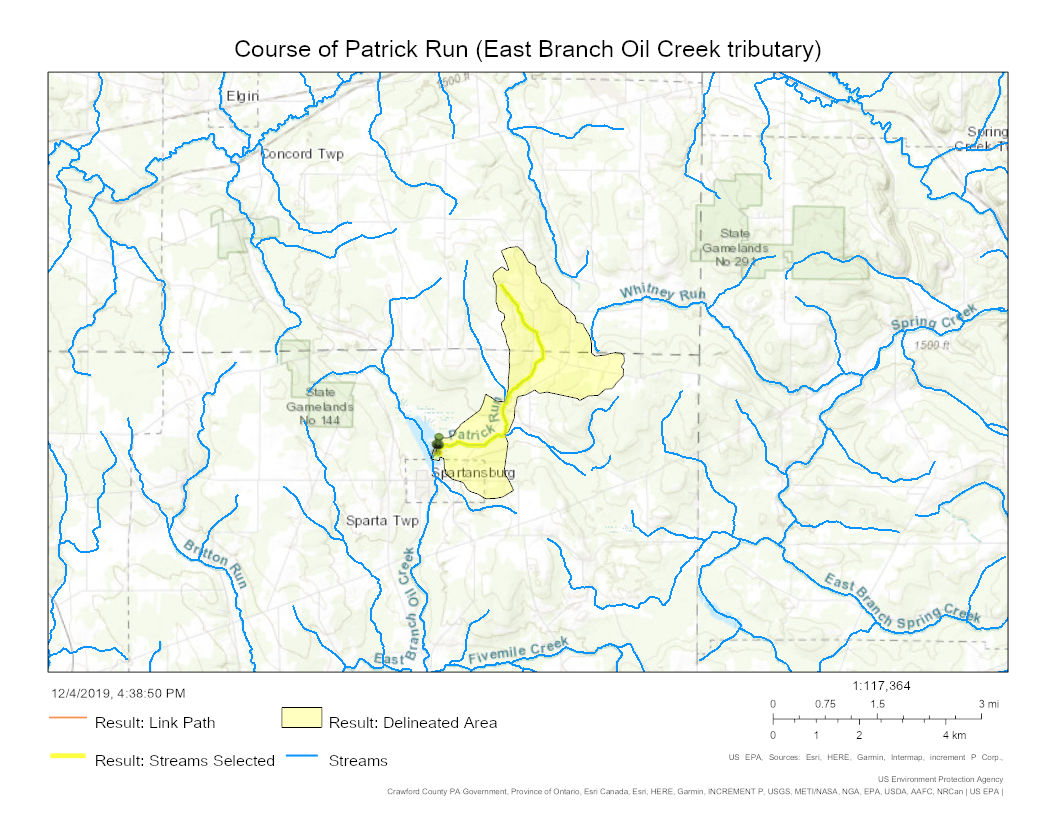
Course of Patrick Run (East Branch Oil Creek tributary)

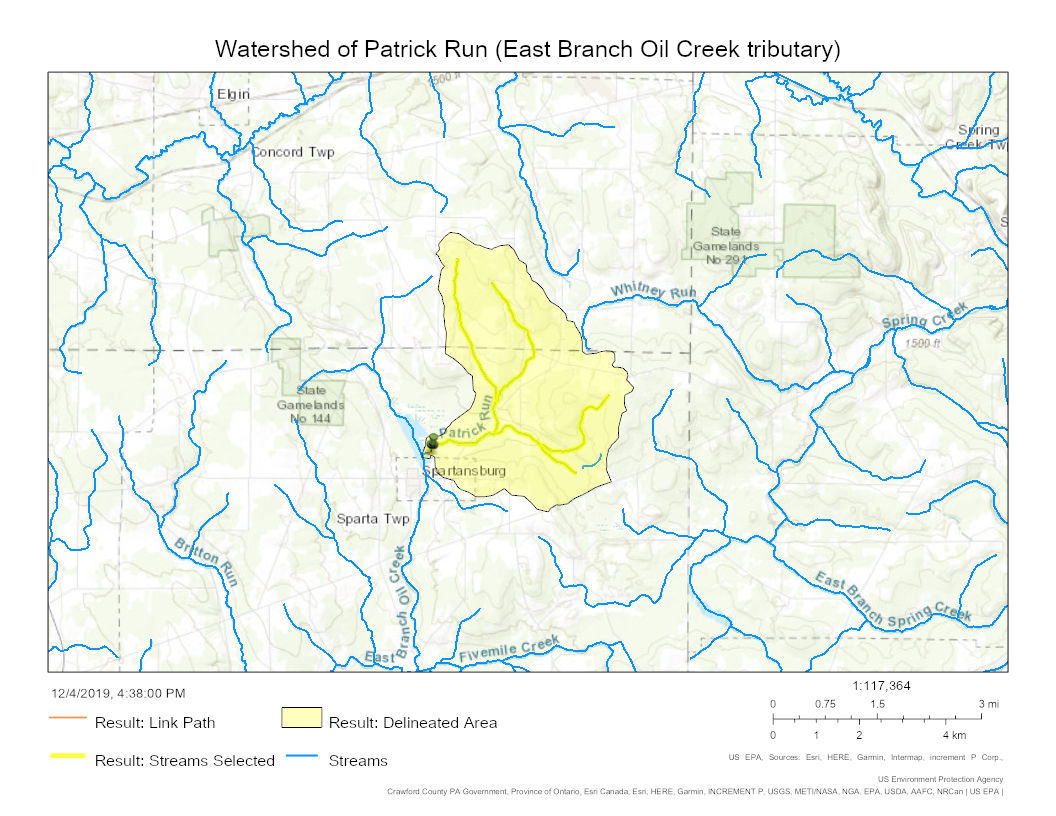
Watershed of Patrick Run (East Branch Oil Creek tributary)
