= Centerville, Crawford County, Pennsylvania =

Borough in Pennsylvania, US

Centerville, Pennsylvania
- Borough
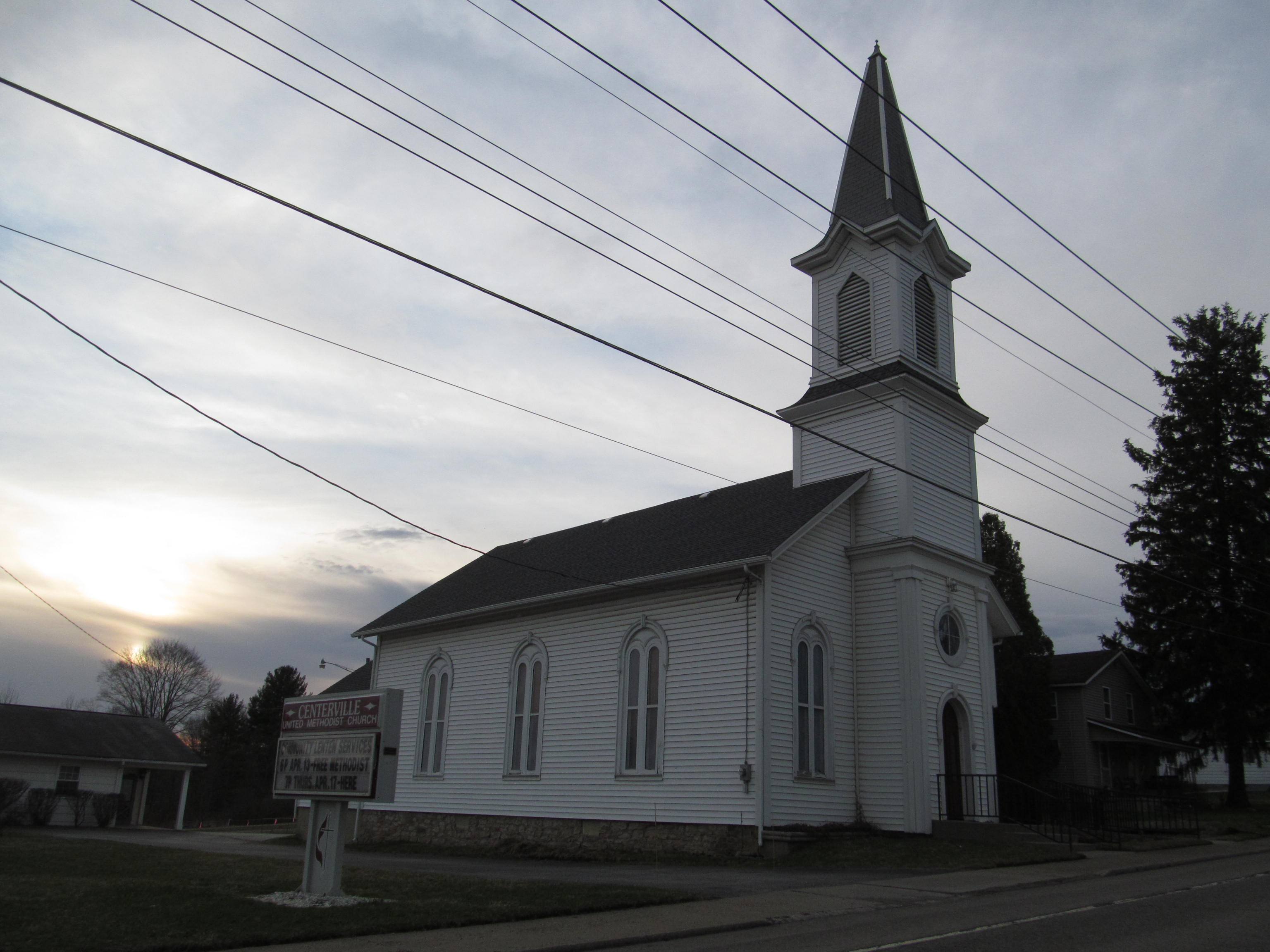
- Centerville United Methodist Church

- Location of Centerville in Crawford County, Pennsylvania.

- Location of Centerville in Pennsylvania
- Coordinates: 41°44′7″N 79°45′16″W
- Country: United States
- State: Pennsylvania
- County: Crawford County
- Founded: 1812

Area
  - Total: 1.75 sq mi (4.52 km^{2})
  - Land: 1.75 sq mi (4.52 km^{2})
  - Water: 0 sq mi (0.00 km^{2})
- Elevation (where Oil Creek flows out of the borough): 1,260 ft (380 m)
- Highest elevation (PA 8 at the northern borough line): 1,510 ft (460 m)
- Lowest elevation (Oil Creek): 1,248 ft (380 m)

Population (2020)
  - Total: 176
  - Estimate (2022): 174
  - Density: 102.0/sq mi (39.38/km^{2})
- Time zone: UTC-4 (EST)
  - Summer (DST): UTC-5 (EDT)
- Area code: 814
- FIPS code: 42-12184
- GNIS feature ID: 1215132

Centerville is a borough in Crawford County, Pennsylvania, United States. The population was 176 at the 2020 census, down from 218 at the 2010 census. It was established in 1812.

== Geography ==
Centerville is located in eastern Crawford County at 41°44′11″N 79°45′39″W (41.736376, -79.760965). It is bordered by Rome Township to the north, east, and south; by Steuben Township to the southwest; and by Athens Township to the west.

According to the United States Census Bureau, the borough has a total area of 1.8 square miles (4.6 km^{2}), all land.

=== Natural features ===
Centerville Borough is located just north of the southern terminal moraine for glaciation in northwestern Pennsylvania. The borough is drained by Oil Creek, a southward-flowing tributary of the Allegheny River, which runs through the western side of town and East Branch Oil Creek, which enters the borough from the northeast and joins the main creek west of the borough center. The lowest elevation in Centerville is 1,260 ft (380 m), where Oil Creek flows south from the borough. The highest elevation is 1,510 ft (460 m) at the northern borough boundary.

=== Major Roads ===
Pennsylvania Route 8 passes through Centerville, leading north 12 miles (19 km) to Union City and south 9 miles (14 km) to Titusville.

== Demographics ==
Historical population
Census	Pop.	Note	%±
1870	322		—
1880	307		−4.7%
1890	274		−10.7%
1900	260		−5.1%
1910	264		1.5%
1920	218		−17.4%
1930	229		5.0%
1940	273		19.2%
1950	245		−10.3%
1960	238		−2.9%
1970	246		3.4%
1980	245		−0.4%
1990	249		1.6%
2000	247		−0.8%
2010	218		−11.7%
2020	176		−19.3%
2022 (est.)	174		−1.1%

As of the census of 2000, there were 247 people, 99 households, and 67 families residing in the borough. The population density was 138.3 inhabitants per square mile (53.4/km^{2}). There were 109 housing units at an average density of 61.0 per square mile (23.6/km^{2}). The racial makeup of the borough was 98.79% White, 0.40% Asian, and 0.81% from two or more races.

There were 99 households, out of which 25.3% had children under the age of 18 living with them, 64.6% were married couples living together, 1.0% had a female householder with no husband present, and 32.3% were non-families. 24.2% of all households were made up of individuals, and 10.1% had someone living alone who was 65 years of age or older. The average household size was 2.49 and the average family size was 3.06.

In the borough the population was spread out, with 21.9% under the age of 18, 7.7% from 18 to 24, 29.1% from 25 to 44, 24.7% from 45 to 64, and 16.6% who were 65 years of age or older. The median age was 41 years. For every 100 females there were 109.3 males. For every 100 females age 18 and over, there were 105.3 males.

The median income for a household in the borough was $29,318, and the median income for a family was $32,778. Males had a median income of $30,417 versus $22,083 for females. The per capita income for the borough was $12,860. About 13.4% of families and 17.6% of the population were below the poverty line, including 34.8% of those under the age of eighteen and none of those sixty-five or over.
