= Shirley Run (Thompson Creek tributary) =

Stream in Pennsylvania, USA

Shirley Run Tributary to Thompson Creek
- Location of Shirley Run mouth Shirley Run (Thompson Creek tributary) (the United States)

Location
- Country: United States
- State: Pennsylvania
- County: Crawford; Warren

Physical characteristics
- Source: Three Bridge Run divide
  - location: about 2 miles northeast of Vrooman, Pennsylvania at "Blue Swamp"
  - coordinates: 41°44′43″N 079°36′37″W
  - elevation: 1,592 ft (485 m)
- Mouth: Thompson Creek
  - location: Shelmandine Springs, Pennsylvania
  - coordinates: 41°40′51″N 079°40′04″W
  - elevation: 1,360 ft (410 m)
- Length: 5.90 mi (9.50 km)
- Basin size: 11.61 square miles (30.1 km^{2})
- Discharge
  - location: Thompson Creek
  - average: 22.54 cu ft/s (0.638 m^{3}/s) at mouth with Thompson Creek

Basin features
- Progression: south-southwest
- River system: Allegheny River
- Tributaries
  - left: unnamed tributaries
  - right: Dolly Run
- Bridges: Harrison Road, Mageetown Road, Cloverdale Road, PA 89, Thompson Run Road

Shirley Run is a 5.90 mi (9.50 km) long 3rd order tributary to Thompson Creek in Crawford County, Pennsylvania.

== Course ==
Shirley Run rises about 2 miles northeast of Vrooman, Pennsylvania, in Blue Swamp at the Warren County line and then flows south-southwest to join Thompson Creek at Shelmandine Springs.

== Watershed ==
Shirley Run drains 11.66 square miles (30.2 km^{2}) of area, receives about 45.6 in/year of precipitation, has a wetness index of 450.87, and is about 52% forested.

== See also ==
- List of rivers of Pennsylvania
