= East Branch Oil Creek (Oil Creek tributary) =

East Branch Oil Creek Tributary to Oil Creek
- Location within Pennsylvania Location within the United States

Location
- Country: United States
- State: Pennsylvania
- County: Crawford
- City: Centerville; Spartansburg

Physical characteristics
- Source: Clear Lake in Spartansburg, Pennsylvania
  - location: Spartansburg, Pennsylvania
  - coordinates: 41°49′29″N 079°41′07″W
  - elevation: 1,441 ft (439 m)
- Mouth: about 0.1 miles west of Centerville, Pennsylvania
  - location: Centerville, Crawford County, Pennsylvania
  - coordinates: 41°44′05″N 079°45′59″W
  - elevation: 1,278 ft (390 m)
- Length: 10.88 mi (17.51 km)
- Basin size: 59.8 square miles (155 km^{2})
- Discharge
  - location: Centerville, Pennsylvania
  - average: 110.1 cu ft/s (3.12 m^{3}/s) at mouth with Oil Creek

Basin features
- Progression: Oil Creek → Allegheny River → Ohio River → Mississippi River → Gulf of Mexico
- River system: Allegheny River (Oil Creek)
- Population: 3,256 (2010)
- Tributaries
  - left: Patrick Run; Fivemile Creek; Coon Run; Brannon Run
  - right: Stranahan Run; Britton Run; Twomile Creek
- Waterbodies: Clear Lake
- Bridges: PA Route 77, PA Route 89, Britton Run Road, Garland Street, PA Route 8

East Branch Oil Creek is a 10.9-mile (17.5 km) 4th order tributary to Oil Creek in Crawford County, Pennsylvania.

== Course ==
East Branch of Oil Creek rises at the confluence of Stranahan and Patrick Runs in Clear Lake. It then flows south and southwest through the Erie Drift Plain to Centerville, Pennsylvania where it joins Oil Creek.

=== Tributaries ===
Tributaries of East Branch Oil Creek (Oil Creek tributary)

Name, Bank	River Mile (km)	Watershed Area in Square Miles (km^{2})	Average Discharge	Mouth Coordinates	Mouth Elevation	Source Coordinates	Source Elevation	Remarks
Mouth		59.8 square miles (155 km^{2})	101.10 cu ft/s (2.863 m^{3}/s)	41°44′05″N 079°45′59″W	1,278 ft (390 m)	41°29′29″N 79°41′07″W	1,441 ft (439 m)	East Branch Oil Creek begins at Clear Lake in Spartansburg, Pennsylvania and then flows southwest to meet Oil Creek at Centerville, Pennsylvania.
Twomile Creek, right bank	1.74 mi (2.80 km)	3.58 square miles (9.3 km^{2})	6.85 cu ft/s (0.194 m^{3}/s)	41°44′43″N 079°45′23″W	1,283 ft (391 m)	41°47′31″N 079°45′50″W	1,555 ft (474 m)	Twomile Creek rises about 0.75 miles southwest of Britton Run, Pennsylvania and then flows south to meet East Branch Oil Creek at Centerville, Pennsylvania.
Brannon Run, left bank	3.62 mi (5.83 km)	3.11 square miles (8.1 km^{2})	6.03 cu ft/s (0.171 m^{3}/s)	41°45′25″N 079°44′00″W	1,299 ft (396 m)	41°43′53″N 079°42′03″W	1,490 ft (450 m)	Brannon Run rises on the McLaughlin Creek divide about 2 miles east of Centerville, Pennsylvania and then flows northwest to meet East Branch Oil Creek about 1.5 miles northeast of Centerville.
Britton Run, right bank	5.04 mi (8.11 km)	9.30 square miles (24.1 km^{2})	17.98 cu ft/s (0.509 m^{3}/s)	41°46′20″N 079°43′44″W	1,311 ft (400 m)	41°50′56″N 079°44′26″W	1,658 ft (505 m)	Britton Run rises in a pond on the Lilley Run divide about 1.5 miles west of Concord Corners, Pennsylvania. The run then flows generally south to meet East Branch Oil Creek about 1.5 miles west of Glynden, Pennsylvania.
Coon Run, left bank	5.78 mi (9.30 km)	1.24 square miles (3.2 km^{2})	2.49 cu ft/s (0.071 m^{3}/s)	41°46′41″N 079°43′13″W	1,322 ft (403 m)	41°45′32″N 079°41′04″W	1,650 ft (500 m)	Coon Run rises about 2 miles southeast of Glynden, Pennsylvania and then flows northwest to meet East Branch Oil Creek at Glynden, Pennsylvania.
Fivemile Creek, left bank	8.06 mi (12.97 km)	10.75 square miles (27.8 km^{2})	20.86 cu ft/s (0.591 m^{3}/s)	41°46′41″N 079°43′13″W	1,322 ft (403 m)	41°45′55″N 079°37′48″W	1,680 ft (510 m)	Fivemile Creek rises about 2 miles east-northeast of Buell Corners on the Shirley Run divide. Fivemile Creek then flows north then west through Fish Flats to meet East Branch Oil Creek about 3 miles northeast of Centerville, Pennsylvania.
Patrick Run, left bank	11.74 mi (18.89 km)	2.24 square miles (5.8 km^{2})	4.78 cu ft/s (0.135 m^{3}/s)	41°49′46″N 079°40′06″W	1,441 ft (439 m)	41°51′59″N 079°40′06″W	1,752 ft (534 m)	Patrick Run rises in a pond on the South Branch French Creek divide about 2 miles northeast of Spartansburg, Pennsylvania and then flows southwest to meet East Branch Oil Creek within Clear Lake at Spartansburg.
Stranahan Run, right bank	12.43 mi (20.00 km)	3.04 square miles (7.9 km^{2})	6.35 cu ft/s (0.180 m^{3}/s)	41°50′14″N 079°41′37″W	1,441 ft (439 m)	41°50′25″N 079°43′21″W	1,650 ft (500 m)	Stranahan Run rises about 1.5 miles northwest of Spartansburg, Pennsylvania in State Game Lands #144 on the Britton Run divide. The run then flows southeast to meet East Branch Oil Creek within Clear Lake at Spartansburg.

== Watershed ==
East Branch Oil Creek drains 59.8 square miles (155 km^{2}) of area, receives about 46.0 in/year of precipitation, has a topographic wetness index of 467.92, and has an average water temperature of 7.56 °C. The watershed is 49% forested.

== Additional Maps ==
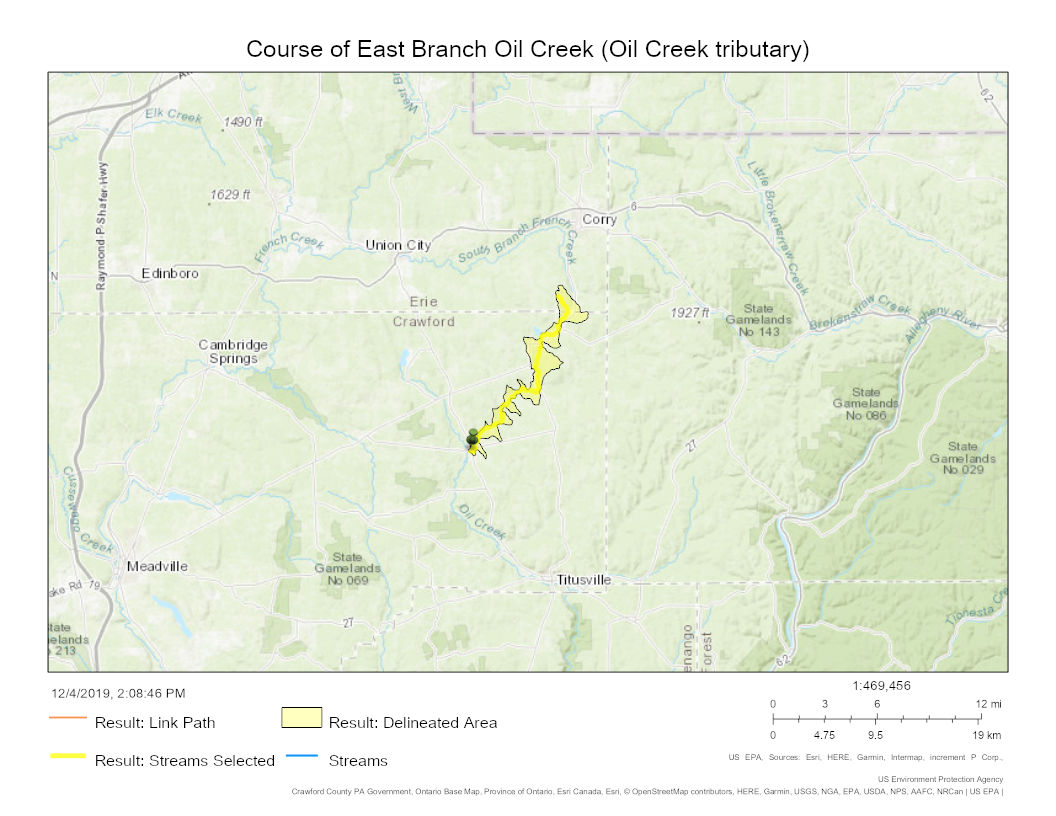
Course of East Branch Oil Creek (Oil Creek tributary)

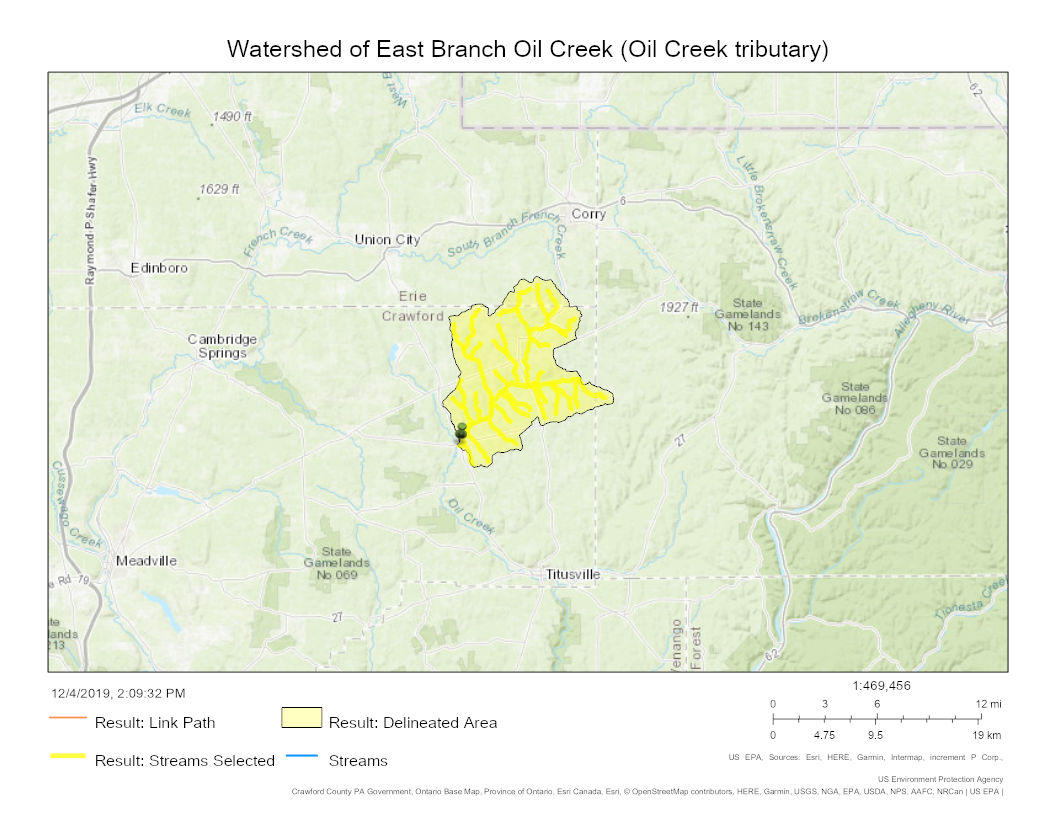
Watershed of East Branch Oil Creek (Oil Creek tributary)
