= Britton Run (East Branch Oil Creek tributary) =

Britton Run Tributary to East Branch Oil Creek
- Location within Pennsylvania Location within the United States

Location
- Country: United States
- State: Pennsylvania
- County: Crawford
- Township: Rome; Sparta

Physical characteristics
- Source: divide between Britton Run and Lilley Run
  - location: pond about 1.5 miles west-southwest of Concord Corners, Pennsylvania
  - coordinates: 41°50′56″N 079°44′26″W
  - elevation: 1,658 ft (505 m)
- Mouth: East Branch Oil Creek
  - location: about 0.5 miles west of Glynden, Pennsylvania
  - coordinates: 41°46′20″N 079°43′44″W
  - elevation: 1,311 ft (400 m)
- Length: 6.9 mi (11.1 km)
- Basin size: 9.3 square miles (24 km^{2})
- Discharge
  - location: East Branch Oil Creek
  - average: 17.98 cu ft/s (0.509 m^{3}/s) at mouth with East Branch Oil Creek

Basin features
- Progression: East Branch Oil Creek → Oil Creek → Allegheny River → Ohio River → Mississippi River → Gulf of Mexico
- River system: Allegheny River (Oil Creek)
- Tributaries
  - left: unnamed tributaries
  - right: unnamed tributaries
- Bridges: Chelton Hill Road, Canadohta Lake Road, Britton Run Road (x2), PA 77, Firth Road

Britton Run is a 6.90 mi (11.10 km) long tributary to East Branch Oil Creek in Crawford County, Pennsylvania.

== Course ==
Britton Run rises in a pond on the Lilley Run divide about 1.5 miles west of Concord Corners, Pennsylvania. Britton Run then flows southwest then southeast through the Erie Drift Plain to East Branch Oil Creek about 0.5 miles west of Glynden, Pennsylvania.

== Watershed ==
Britton Run drains 9.30 square miles (24.1 km^{2}) of area, receives about 46.2 in/year of precipitation, has a topographic wetness index of 481.24 and is about 40% forested.

== Additional Maps ==
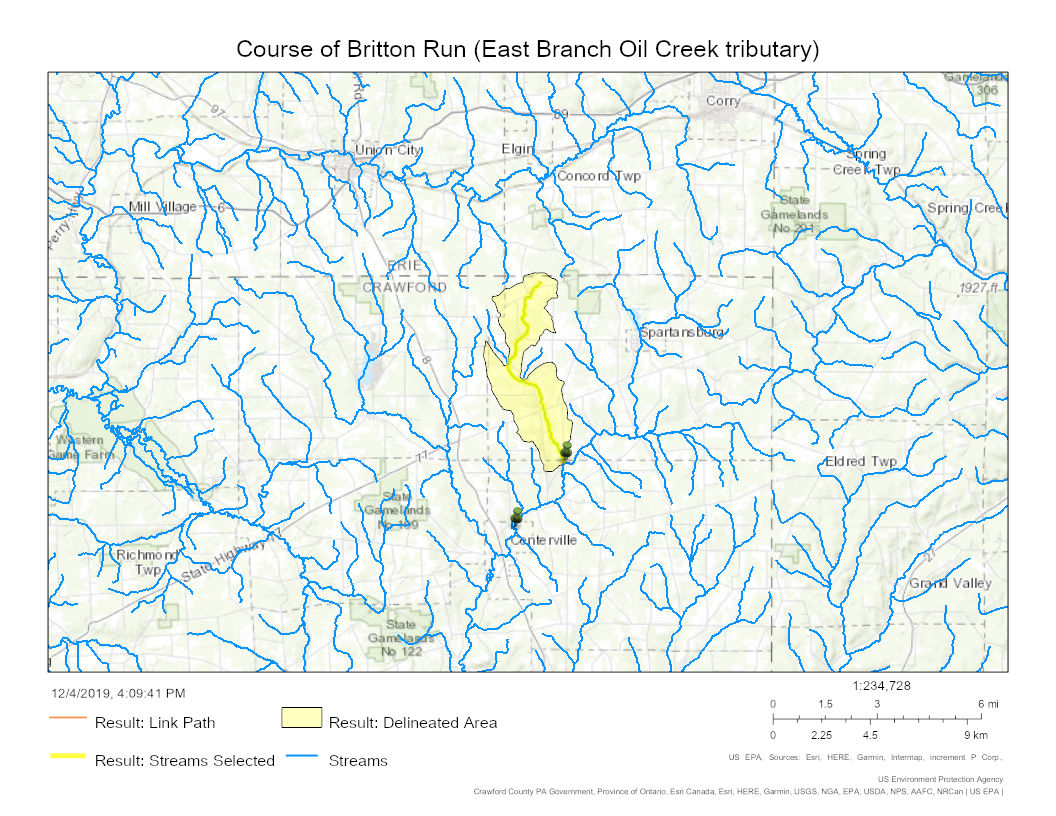
Course of Britton Run (East Branch Oil Creek tributary)

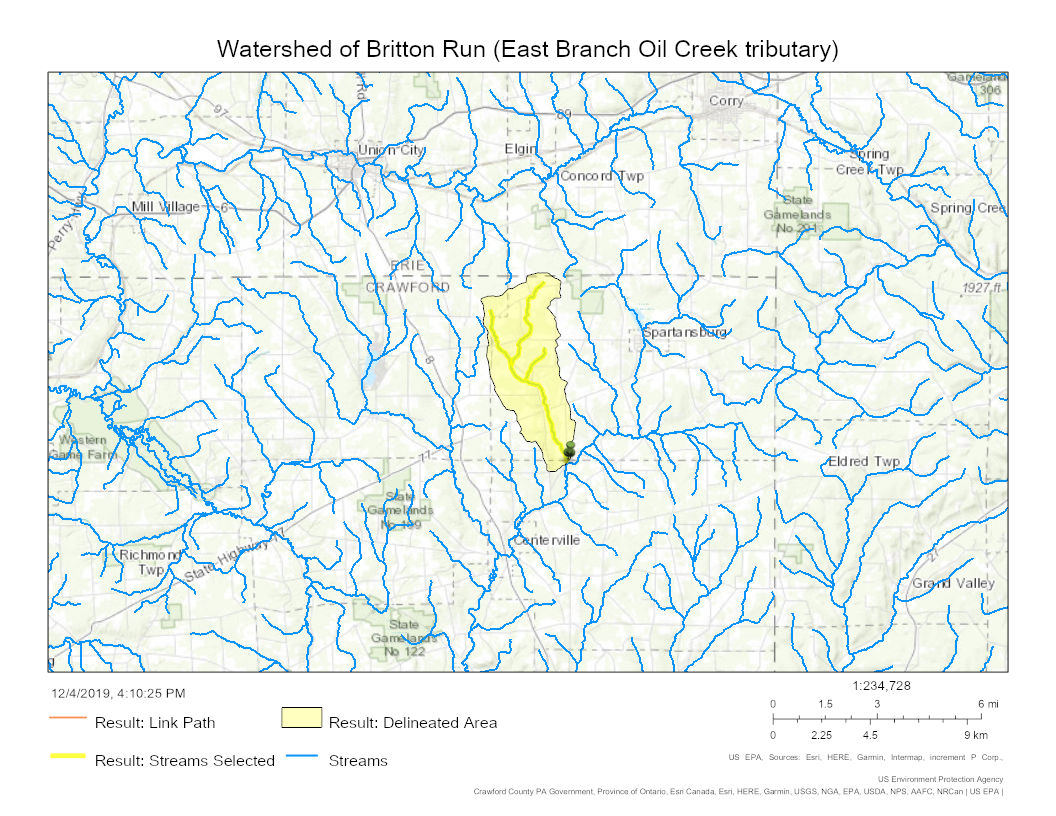
Watershed of Britton Run (East Branch Oil Creek tributary)
