= McLaughlin Creek (Thompson Creek tributary) =

Stream in Pennsylvania, USA

McLaughlin Creek Tributary to Thompson Creek
- Location within Pennsylvania

Location
- Country: United States
- State: Pennsylvania
- County: Crawford
- City: Hydetown

Physical characteristics
- Source: divide between East Branch of Oil Creek and Thompson Creek
  - location: Buell Corners, Pennsylvania
  - coordinates: 41°45′11″N 079°40′55″W
  - elevation: 1,710 ft (520 m)
- Mouth: about 0.5 miles upstream on Thompson Creek from Hydetown, Pennsylvania
  - location: Hydetown, Pennsylvania
  - coordinates: 41°39′31″N 079°42′50″W
  - elevation: 1,270 ft (390 m)
- Length: 8.0 mi (12.9 km)
- Basin size: 9.79 square miles (25.4 km^{2})
- Discharge
  - location: Hydetown, Pennsylvania
  - average: 18.63 cu ft/s (0.528 m^{3}/s) at mouth with Thompson Creek

Basin features
- Progression: south-southwest
- River system: Allegheny River (Oil Creek)
- Tributaries
  - left: unnamed tributaries
  - right: unnamed tributaries
- Bridges: PA 89, Stewart Road, Mageetown Road, Fink Road, Gilson Ridge Road, Bog Hollow Road, Thompson Run Road

McLaughlin Creek is a 8.0 mi (12.9 km) stream that rises in a swampy area to the south of Buell Corners on the divide between Thompson Creek and East Branch of Oil Creek in Crawford County, Pennsylvania.

== Variant names ==
According to the Geographic Names Information System, it has also been known historically as:

- Little Oil Creek

== Course ==
McLaughlin Creek flows west from the swamp underneath PA 89 and then southwest around Fink and Gilson Ridges. Once around the ridges, it turns south and rapidly falls through Bog Hollow to meet Thompson Creek at the bottom. Bog Hollow marks the terminal moraine for glaciation.

== Additional Maps ==
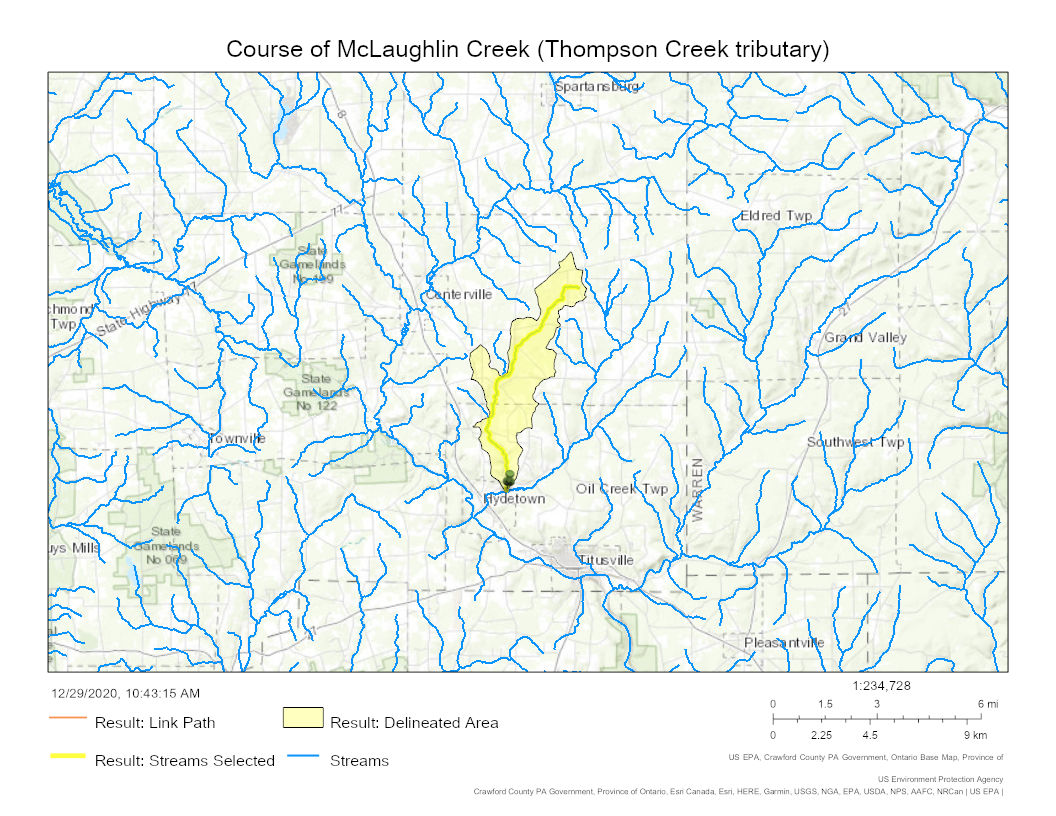
Course of McLaughlin Creek (Thompson Creek tributary) in Crawford County, Pennsylvania

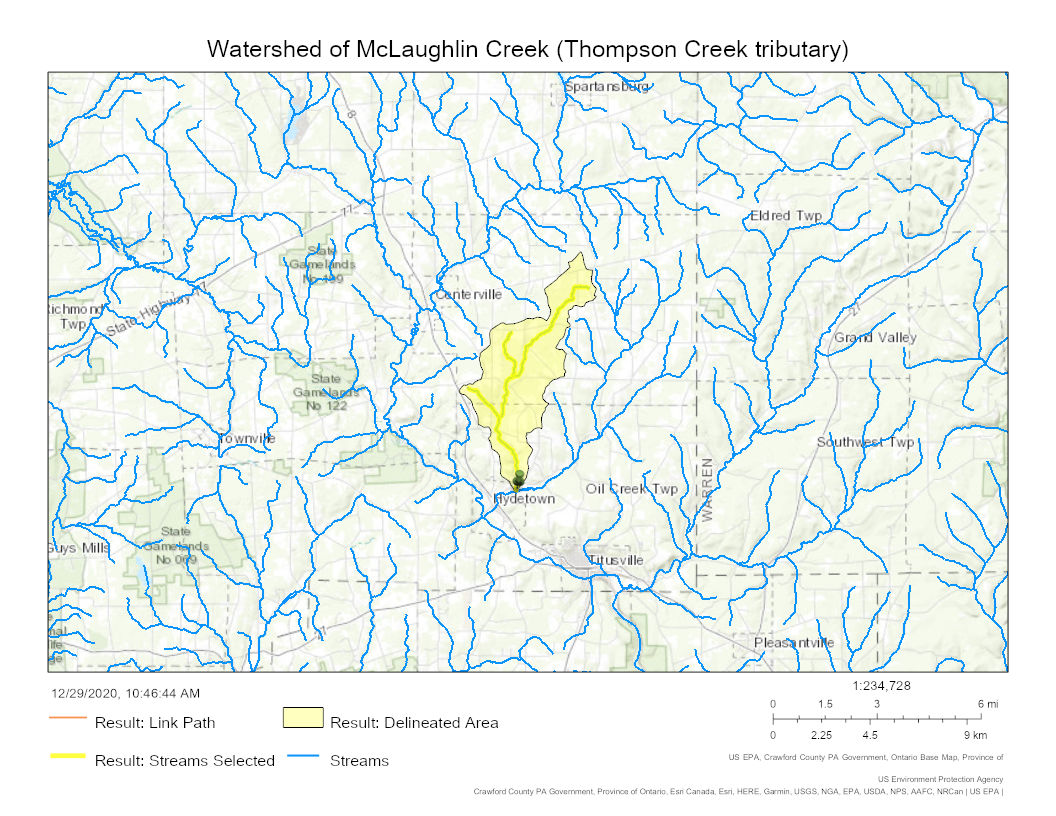
Watershed of McLaughlin Creek (Thompson Creek tributary) in Crawford County, Pennsylvania
