= Brandywine Creek =

Brandywine Creek may refer to:

== Canada ==
- Brandywine Creek (British Columbia), a tributary of the Cheakamus River

== United States ==
- Brandywine Creek (Big Blue River), in Indiana
- Brandywine Creek (St. Joseph River tributary), in Michigan
- Brandywine Creek (Broken Sword Creek tributary), Crawford County, Ohio
- Brandywine Creek (Cuyahoga River tributary), in Summit County, Ohio
- Brandywine Creek (Quittapahilla Creek tributary), in Lebanon County, Pennsylvania
- Brandywine Creek (Christina River tributary), in Chester County, Pennsylvania and New Castle County, Delaware
  - East Branch Brandywine Creek, in Chester County, Pennsylvania
  - West Branch Brandywine Creek, in Chester County, Pennsylvania
- Brandywine Creek State Park, in New Castle County, Delaware
- Battle of Brandywine Creek, during the American Revolutionary War (1777)

== See also ==
- Brandywine (disambiguation)
- Baranduin or Brandywine River, a river in Middle-earth in the fiction of J. R. R. Tolkien
- Brandywine Falls (disambiguation)
