= AW Ursae Majoris =

Variable star in the constellation Ursa Major

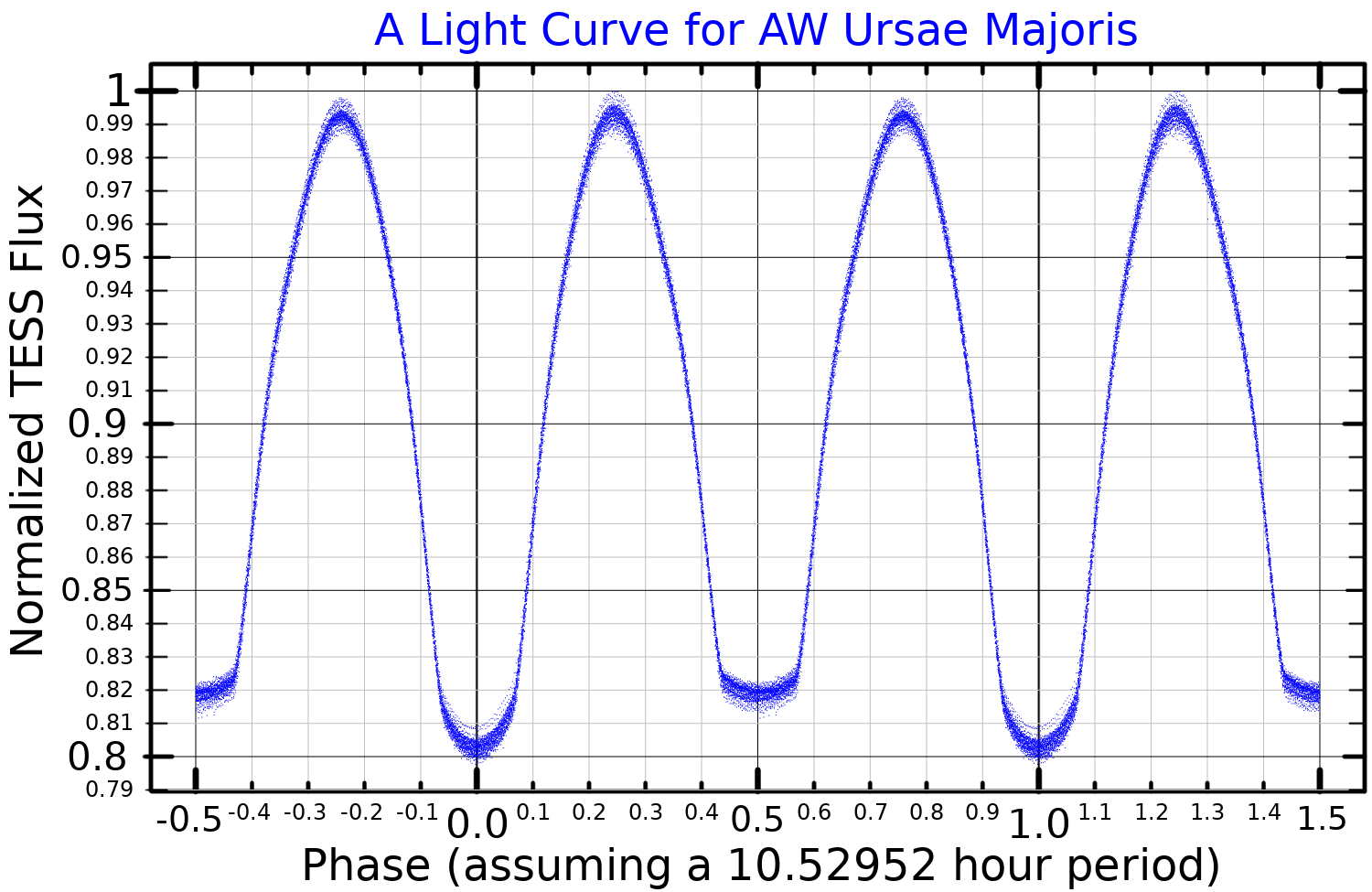
- A light curve for AW Ursae Majoris, plotted from TESS data

Observation data Epoch J2000 Equinox ICRS
- Constellation: Ursa Major
- Right ascension: 11^{h} 30^{m} 04.316^{s}
- Declination: +29° 57′ 52.67″
- Apparent magnitude (V): Max: 6.83; Min_{1}: 7.13; Min_{2}: 7.08

Characteristics
- Spectral type: F0V–F1V
- Variable type: Contact W UMa

Astrometry
Radial velocity (R_{v})	−17.0±1.57 km/s
Proper motion (μ)	RA: −84.298 mas/yr Dec.: −198.900 mas/yr
Parallax (π)	14.7836±0.0295 mas
Distance	220.6 ± 0.4 ly (67.6 ± 0.1 pc)
Absolute magnitude (M_{V})	2.74±0.12

Orbit
Period (P)	0.438732 d
Semi-major axis (a)	2.74 ± 0.93 Gm (0.0183 ± 0.0062 AU)
Eccentricity (e)	0.00 (assumed)
Inclination (i)	78.3°
Periastron epoch (T)	2,443,974.198 JD
Argument of periastron (ω) (secondary)	0.00°
Semi-amplitude (K_{1}) (primary)	29±8 km/s
Semi-amplitude (K_{2}) (secondary)	423±80 km/s

Details

Primary
Mass	1.79±0.14 M_{☉}
Radius	1.49 R_{☉}
Luminosity	5.9 – 6.5 L_{☉}
Temperature	6.980 K
Metallicity [Fe/H]	−0.01±0.08 dex
Rotational velocity (v sin i)	181.4 km/s
Age	3.26±0.17 Gyr

Secondary
Mass	0.14±0.01 M_{☉}
Radius	≤ 0.678 R_{☉}
Luminosity	0.57 – 0.73 L_{☉}
Temperature	6,201 – 6,901 K

Other designations
- Paczynski’s star, AW UMa, BD+30°2163, FK5 2916, GC 15772, HD 99946, HIP 56109, SAO 62579, PPM 101203, WDS J11301+2958A, LTT 13131

Database references
SIMBAD	data

AW Ursae Majoris is a binary star system in the northern circumpolar constellation of Ursa Major, abbreviated AW UMa. It is an A-type W Ursae Majoris variable (W UMa) with an apparent visual magnitude of 6.83, which is near the lower limit of visibility to the naked eye. This is an eclipsing binary with the brightness dropping to magnitude 7.13 during the primary eclipse and to 7.08 with the secondary eclipse. Parallax measurements give a distance estimate of 221 light years from the Sun. It is drifting closer to the Sun with a radial velocity of approximately −17 km/s. The system has a high proper motion, traversing the celestial sphere at the rate of 0.216 arc second per annum.

While observing the variable star TU UMa in 1964, B. Paczyński noted that the comparison star BD +30°2163 was itself variable. The latter was determined to be a W UMa-type eclipsing binary with a period of 0.438727 days. A flat light curve during the minimum suggested the primary eclipse is full or annular. In 1972, S. W. Mochnacki and N. A. Doughty modelled the system and determined a very low mass ratio of 0.079±0.08 for the pair, indicating that the secondary has 8% of the mass of the primary.

E. J. Woodward and associates in 1980 found evidence of a recent period change for the system and suspected an intrinsic variability based on mismatches in the light curves over time. In 1981, B. J. McLean made radial velocity measurements of the system and used them to compute orbital elements. R. K. Srivastava confirmed period changes in the range of 10^{−6} to 10^{−7} days occurred during the interval from 1963 to 1988. Further period changes were noted in 1997. In 1999, T. Pribulla and associates proposed that observed velocity changes to the system are the result of an undetected third component. This would have 0.85±0.13 times the mass of the Sun and an orbital period of 398 days. Period changes to the binary are attributed to mass transfer.

B. Paczyński and associates in 2007 proposed an evolutionary model for the system. They suggested that the current secondary was the original primary for the system, and as a result was the first to evolve off the main sequence and expand. Most of the star's mass was then transferred to the companion, until the system reached the current mass ratio. This left the current secondary with a helium core and much of its outer hydrogen envelope stripped away. Because of the mass acquisition, the present day primary now resembles a zero age main sequence star. In 2008, T. Pribulla and S. M. Rucinski called into question the assumption that this is a contact binary system, suggesting instead that the pair share a luminous equatorial belt.

O. J. Eggen in 1967 noted that a nearby star is a common proper motion companion to AW UMa, which may form a tertiary component to this system. This magnitude 9.41 star is located at an angular separation of 67.2″ from the binary pair. The star has a parallax of 14.7 mas, indicating a distance of 222 light years, and is modelled to be a middle-aged main sequence star similar to the Sun.
