= Union Township, Indiana =

Union Township, Indiana may refer to one of the following places:

- Union Township, Adams County, Indiana
- Union Township, Benton County, Indiana
- Union Township, Boone County, Indiana
- Union Township, Clark County, Indiana
- Union Township, Clinton County, Indiana
- Union Township, Crawford County, Indiana
- Union Township, DeKalb County, Indiana
- Union Township, Delaware County, Indiana
- Union Township, Elkhart County, Indiana
- Union Township, Fulton County, Indiana
- Union Township, Gibson County, Indiana
- Union Township, Hendricks County, Indiana
- Union Township, Howard County, Indiana
- Union Township, Huntington County, Indiana
- Union Township, Jasper County, Indiana
- Union Township, Johnson County, Indiana
- Union Township, LaPorte County, Indiana
- Union Township, Madison County, Indiana
- Union Township, Marshall County, Indiana
- Union Township, Miami County, Indiana
- Union Township, Montgomery County, Indiana
- Union Township, Ohio County, Indiana
- Union Township, Parke County, Indiana
- Union Township, Perry County, Indiana
- Union Township, Porter County, Indiana
- Union Township, Randolph County, Indiana
- Union Township, Rush County, Indiana
- Union Township, St. Joseph County, Indiana
- Union Township, Shelby County, Indiana
- Union Township, Tippecanoe County, Indiana
- Union Township, Union County, Indiana
- Union Township, Vanderburgh County, Indiana
- Union Township, Wells County, Indiana
- Union Township, White County, Indiana
- Union Township, Whitley County, Indiana

See also

- Union Township (disambiguation)
