= George Rudicel Polygonal Barn =

- U.S. National Register of Historic Places
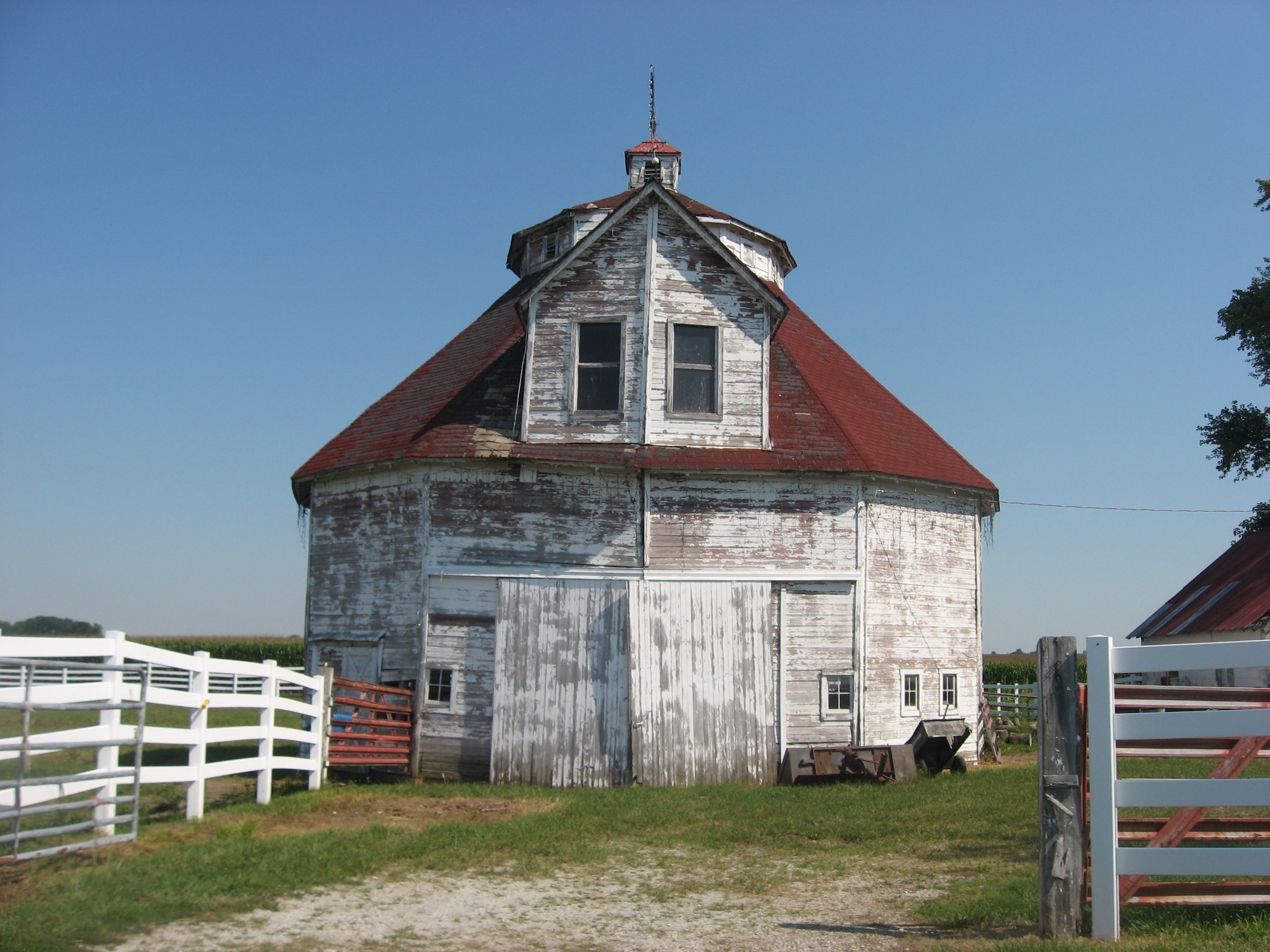
- George Rudicel Polygonal Barn, August 2011

- Location within Indiana Location within the United States
- Location: Junction of County Roads 700S and 400E, southwest of Waldron in Noble Township, Shelby County, Indiana
- Coordinates: 39°25′27″N 85°42′12″W
- Area: less than one acre
- Built: 1910
- Built by: Rudicel, George; Henderson, Roy and Earl
- Architectural style: Vernacular, 12 sided barn
- MPS: Round and Polygonal Barns of Indiana MPS
- NRHP reference No.: 93000463
- Added to NRHP: May 27, 1993

George Rudicel Polygonal Barn is a historic 12-sided barn located in Noble Township, Shelby County, Indiana, United States. It was built in 1910 and is a two-story, vernacular frame barn. It is topped by a cone roof with a large dormer and square cupola.

It was listed on the National Register of Historic Places in 1993.
