= Brandywine =

Brandywine may refer to:

== Food and drink ==
- Brandy, a spirit produced by distilling wine
- Brandywine tomato, a variety of heirloom tomato

== Geographic locations ==
=== Canada ===
- Brandywine Falls Provincial Park, British Columbia
- Brandywine Mountain, British Columbia

=== United States ===
- Brandywine Hundred, an unincorporated subdivision of New Castle County, Delaware
- Brandywine Park, Wilmington, Delaware
- Brandywine School District, northern New Castle County, Delaware
  - Brandywine High School, a high school in Wilmington, Delaware
- Brandywine Township, Hancock County, Indiana
- Brandywine Township, Shelby County, Indiana
- Brandywine, Maryland, a census-designated place in Prince George's County
- Brandywine, Ohio, an unincorporated community
- Brandywine Airport, in Chester County, Pennsylvania
- East Brandywine Township, Chester County, Pennsylvania
- West Brandywine Township, Chester County, Pennsylvania
- Brandywine Creek (Christina River tributary), also known as Brandywine River, in Pennsylvania and Delaware
  - East Branch Brandywine Creek
  - West Branch Brandywine Creek
- Brandywine River Museum, in Chadds Ford, Pennsylvania
- Brandywine Valley Viaduct, a former railroad viaduct in Downingtown, Pennsylvania
- Brandywine, West Virginia, in Pendleton County
- Penn State Brandywine, a Pennsylvania State University campus in Delaware County, Pennsylvania

== Arts ==
- Baranduin or Brandywine River, a river in Middle-earth in the fiction of J. R. R. Tolkien
- Brandywine Productions, a film production company best known for producing the Alien film series
- Brandywine School, a style of illustration and artists' colony in Pennsylvania
- Brandywine Valley Symphony, formerly the Kennett Symphony, located in Kennett Square, Pennsylvania

== Business ==
- Brandywine Realty Trust, an American real estate investment company

== Military ==
- Battle of Brandywine, in Chester County, Pennsylvania in the American Revolutionary War
  - Brandywine Battlefield
- USS Brandywine, ship of the United States Navy

== Other ==
- Brandywine people, a mixed-race ethnic group in Maryland

== See also ==
- Brandywine Creek (disambiguation)
- Brandywine Falls (disambiguation)
