= London, Indiana =

Unincorporated community in Indiana, US

- Unincorporated community and Census-designated place
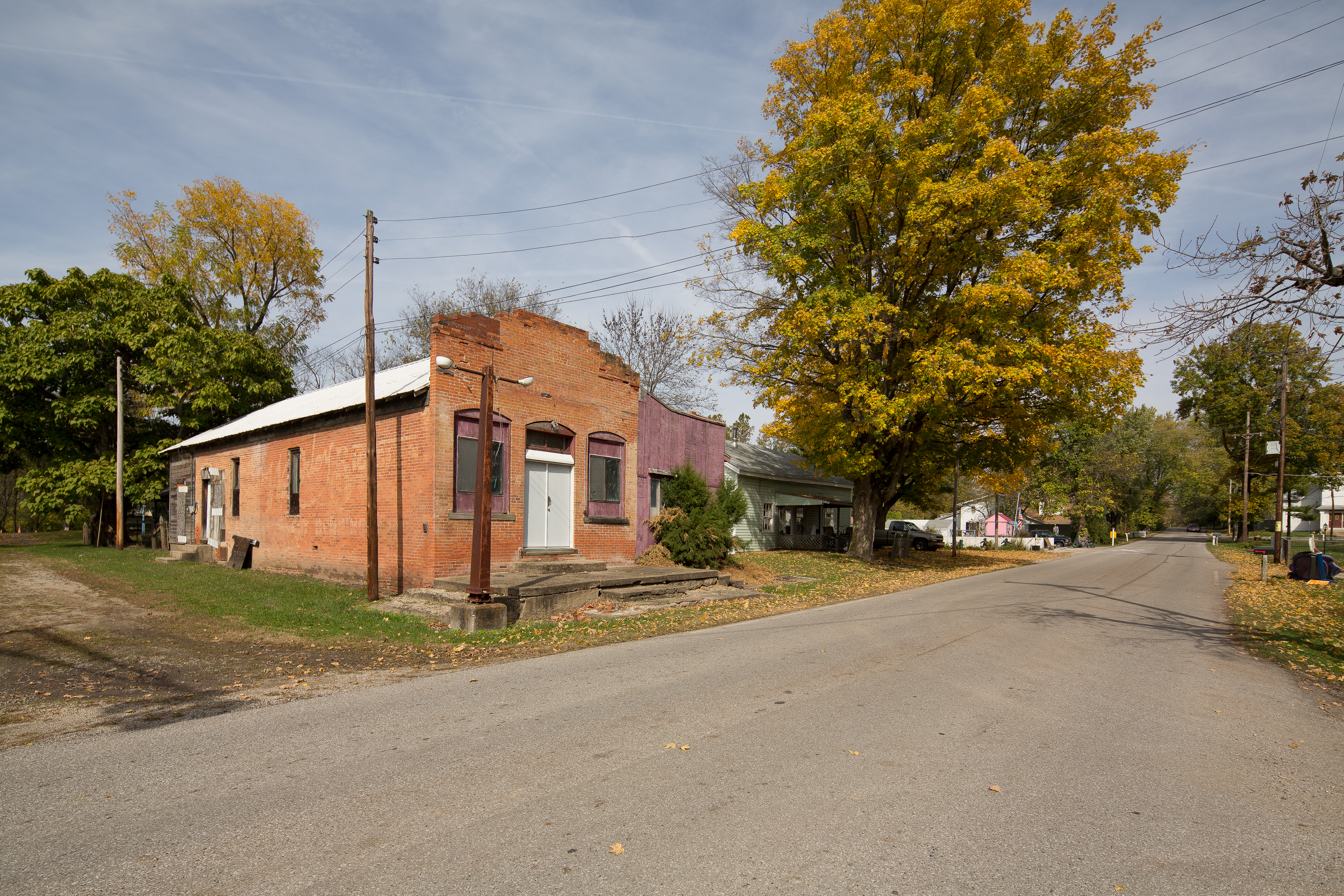

- Location within Indiana Location within the United States
- Coordinates: 39°37′28″N 85°55′03″W
- Country: United States
- State: Indiana
- County: Shelby
- Township: Moral
- Elevation: 781 ft (238 m)
- Time zone: UTC-5 (Eastern (EST))
  - Summer (DST): UTC-4 (EDT)
- ZIP code: 46126
- GNIS feature ID: 2830532

London is an unincorporated community in Moral Township, Shelby County, in the U.S. state of Indiana.

== History ==
London was platted in 1852 when the railroad was extended to that point. The community took its name from London, the capital of England. A post office was established at London in 1854, and remained in operation until it was discontinued in 1959.

On September 9, 1969, Allegheny Airlines Flight 853 on a Boston – Baltimore – Cincinnati – Indianapolis – St. Louis route, collided in midair with a Piper Cherokee during its descent over Fairland, Indiana in Shelby County. The McDonnell Douglas DC-9-31 crashed into a cornfield near London, killing all 78 passengers and 4 crew members on board. The student pilot who was flying the Cherokee was also killed.

== Demographics ==
The United States Census Bureau delineated London as a census designated place in the 2022 American Community Survey.
