= Matt Mason (singer) =

American musician

- Born: 1985
- Origin: Fairland, Indiana, U.S.
- Genres: Country
- Labels: Warner Records

Matt Mason (born c. 1985) is an American country music singer/songwriter from Fairland, Indiana. He was the winner of CMT's Next Superstar in 2011. Prior to that, he competed on Nashville Star.

== Early life and career ==
Mason was born in Fairland, Indiana and attended Triton Central High School in Shelby County, Indiana. He grew up listening to traditional country music, and started playing guitar at age eleven, and from that time onward wanted to sing professionally. At age 16, he opened for Charlie Daniels in western Massachusetts. Six months after graduating from high school in 2004, he moved to Nashville, Tennessee to pursue his career, and found work as a session musician. Within three weeks, he was performing in live shows.

== Reality Television ==
In 2006, at age 20, he appeared on Nashville Star, finishing in fourth place. Afterwards, his productivity was affected by a struggle with alcohol and drug addiction, from which he recovered. He subsequently performed live as often as four times a week in venues on Lower Broadway. In 2011, he won CMT's Next Superstar.

== Post-Superstar ==
Following his Next Superstar win, Mason was signed to Warner Records. Anticipating a slow process of creating and releasing a major-label album, Mason continued to tour and self-release recordings. He released the EP America's Favorite Pastime in 2012.

Mason lives in Nashville.

== Studio albums ==
Title	Album details
Where I've Been	Release date: June 10, 2008; Label: Self-released; Formats: CD, music download
Chasing Stardust	Release date: May 1, 2012; Label: Self-released; Formats: CD, music download
America's Favorite Pastime	Release date: October 23, 2012; Label: Self-released; Formats: CD, music download
When It All Goes South	Release date: February 2, 2015; Label: Self-released; Formats: CD, music download
The Writer's Collection Vol, 1	Release date: April 21, 2017; Label: Self-released; Formats: CD, music download
