= Brandywine Township, Indiana =

Brandywine Township is the name of two townships in the US state of Indiana:

- Brandywine Township, Hancock County, Indiana
- Brandywine Township, Shelby County, Indiana
