= Geneva, Shelby County, Indiana =

Geneva
- Unincorporated community and Census-designated place
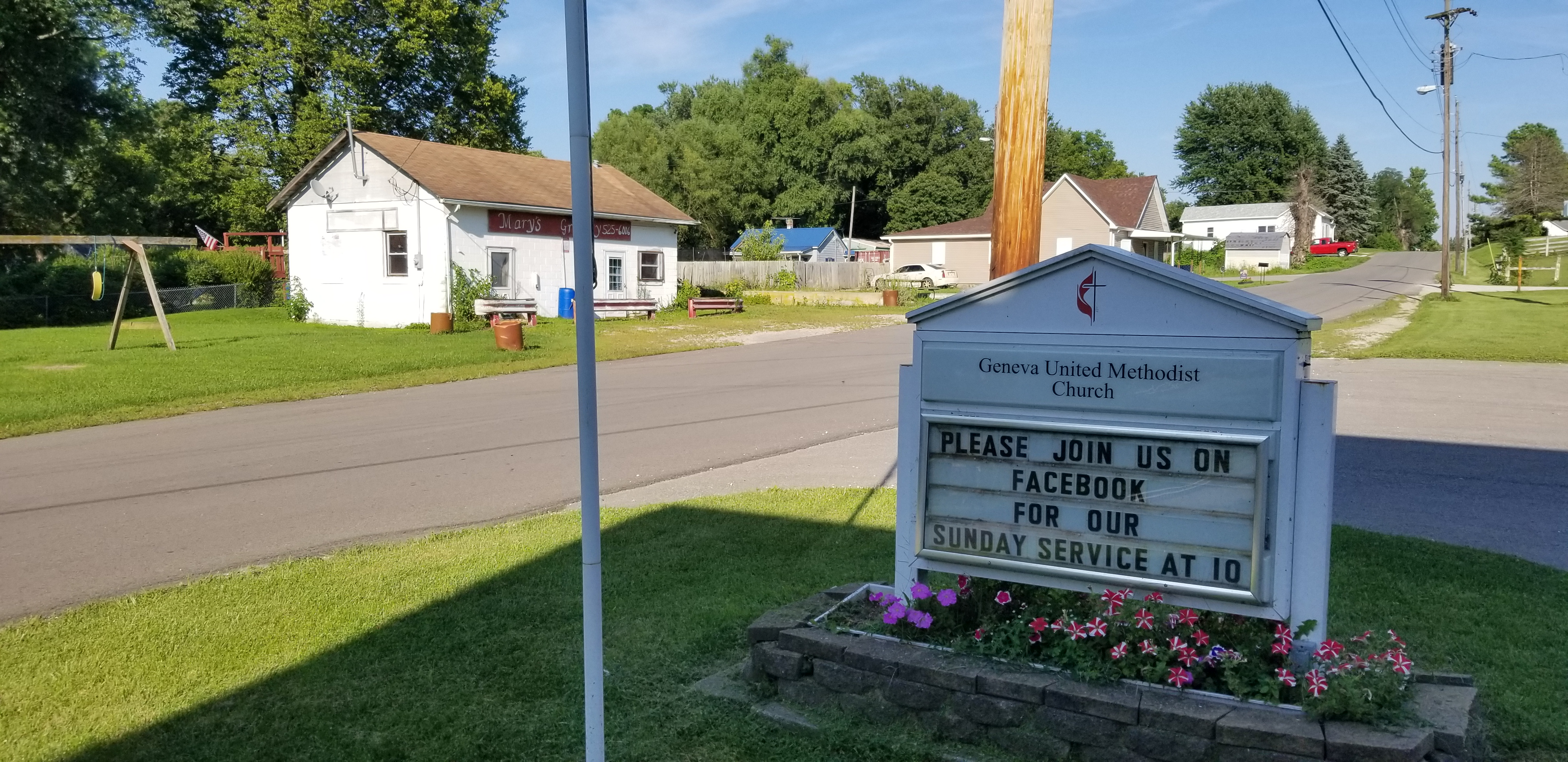
- Geneva United Methodist Church sign and Mary's Grocery Store, facing north on Vandalia Road

- Location within Indiana Location within the United States
- Coordinates: 39°23′28″N 85°43′03″W
- Country: United States
- State: Indiana
- County: Shelby
- Township: Noble
- Elevation: 791 ft (241 m)
- Time zone: UTC-5 (Eastern (EST))
  - Summer (DST): UTC-4 (EDT)
- ZIP code: 47234
- FIPS code: 18-27252
- GNIS feature ID: 2830530

Geneva is an unincorporated community in Noble Township, Shelby County, Indiana, United States.

== History ==
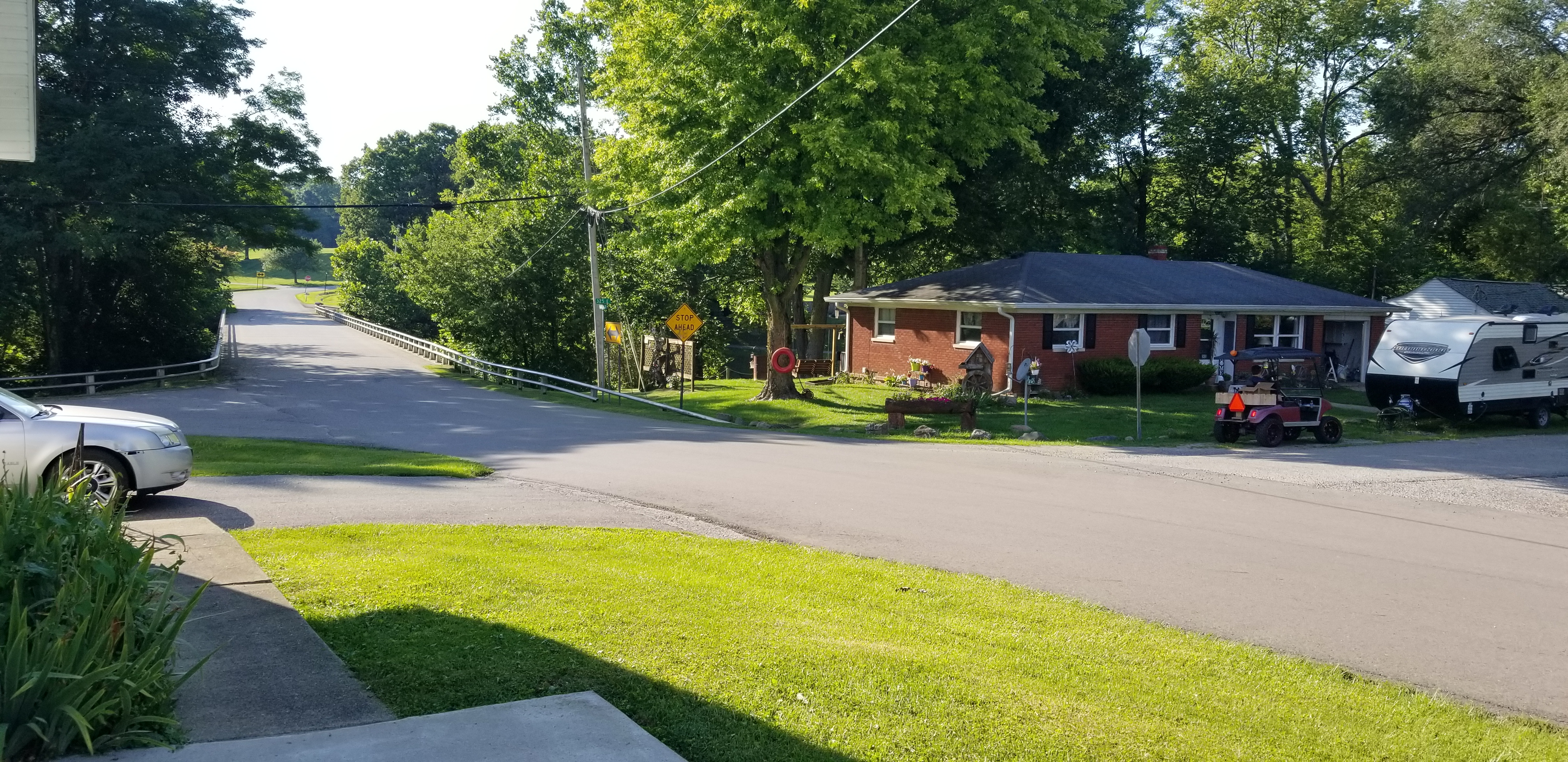
Geneva, Shelby County, Indiana facing south on Vandalia Road.

Geneva was platted in 1853. The community took its name after Geneva, in Switzerland. An old variant name of the community was called Sulphur Hill.

A post office was established under the name Sulphur Hill in 1836, and remained in operation until it was discontinued in 1904.

== Geography ==
Geneva is located about 7 miles south west of St Paul, on East Vandalia Road.

== Demographics ==
The United States Census Bureau first delineated Geneva as a census designated place in the 2022 American Community Survey.
