= Gwynneville =

Gwynneville may refer to:

- Gwynneville, Indiana, a town in the United States
- Gwynneville, New South Wales, a suburb of Wollongong, Australia
