= Wilson Corner, Indiana =

- Unincorporated community
- Location within Indiana Location within the United States
- Coordinates: 39°26′18″N 85°45′19″W
- Country: United States
- State: Indiana
- County: Shelby
- Township: Shelby, Washington
- Elevation: 751 ft (229 m)
- Time zone: UTC-5 (Eastern (EST))
  - Summer (DST): UTC-4 (EDT)
- ZIP code: 46176
- GNIS feature ID: 446133

Wilson Corner is an unincorporated community in Shelby and Washington townships, Shelby County, in the U.S. state of Indiana.

== History ==
An old variant name of the community was called Wilson. A post office was established under this name in 1883, and remained in operation until it was discontinued in 1905. The community has the name of a family which kept a store there.

== Geography ==
Wilson Corner is located at 39°26′18″N 85°45′19″W.
