= Cooper-Alley House =

Historic house in Indiana, United States

- U.S. National Register of Historic Places
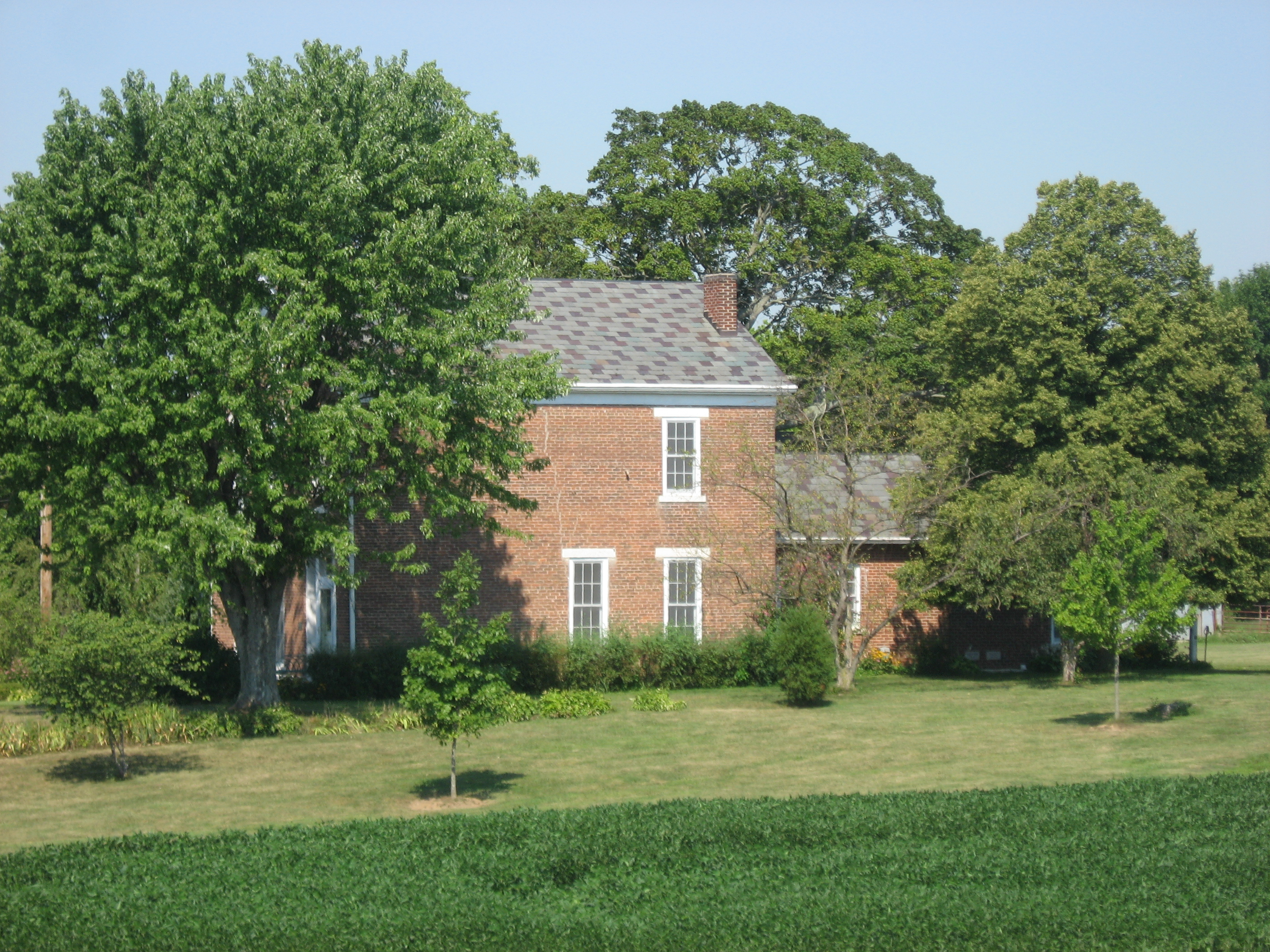
- Cooper-Alley House, August 2011

- Location within Indiana Location within the United States
- Location: South of Waldron in Noble Township, Shelby County, Indiana
- Coordinates: 39°25′15″N 85°40′23″W
- Area: 1.5 acres (0.61 ha)
- Built: 1863-1864
- Built by: Cooper, Edmund; Carlisle, George SR.
- Architectural style: Greek Revival, Italianate
- NRHP reference No.: 82000074
- Added to NRHP: July 7, 1982

Cooper-Alley House, also known as the George Alley Residence, is a historic home located in Noble Township, Shelby County, Indiana. It was built in 1863–1864, and is a two-story, rectangular, brick farmhouse with Greek Revival and Italianate style design elements. It has a gable roof and sits on a stone foundation. A one-story rear addition was built in the late-19th century.

It was listed on the National Register of Historic Places in 1982.
