= Liberty Township Schoolhouse No. 2 =

Historic place in Indiana, United States

- U.S. National Register of Historic Places
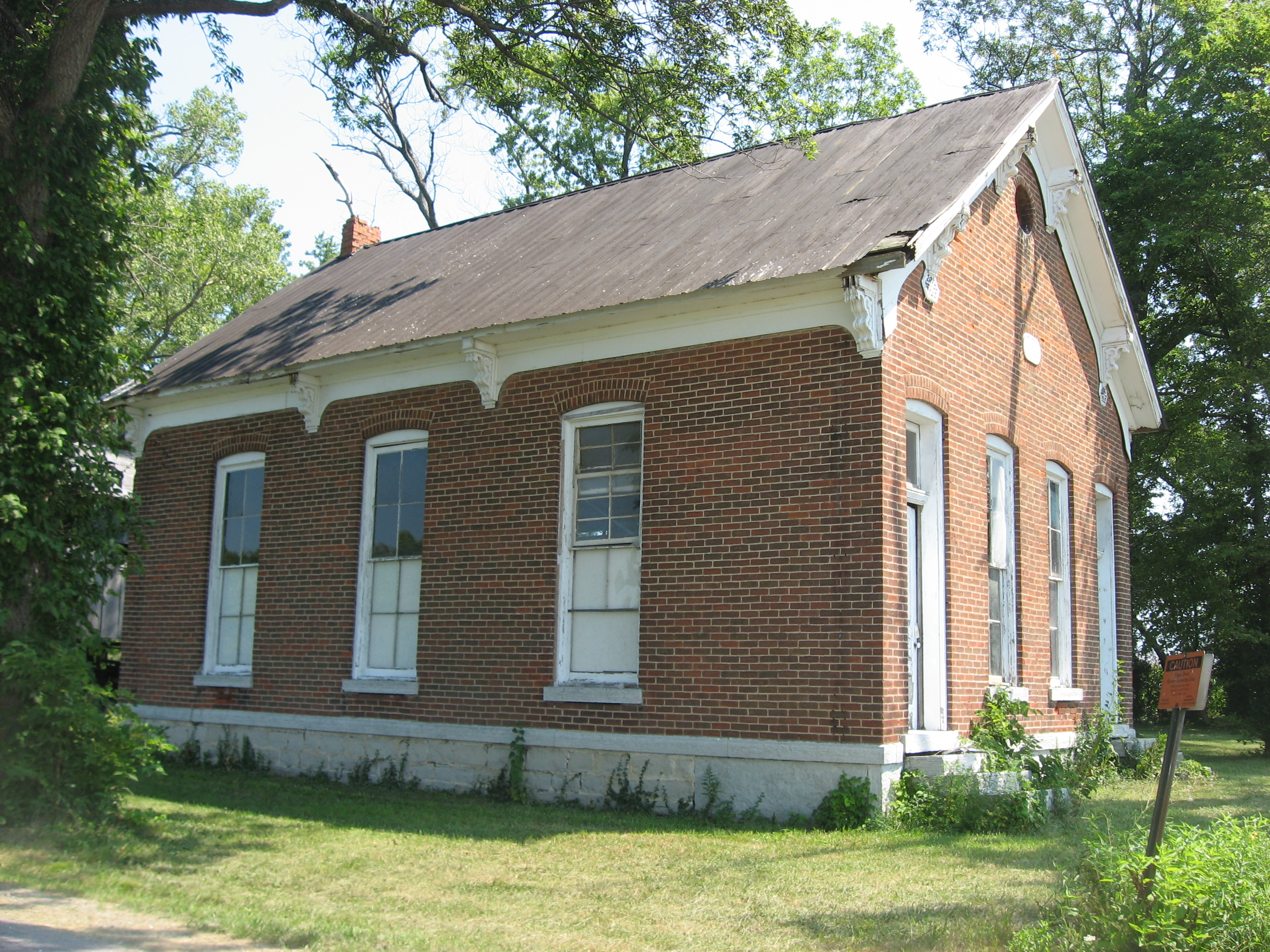
- Liberty Township Schoolhouse No. 2, August 2011

- Location within Indiana Location within the United States
- Location: Junction of State Road 244 and County Road 600E, north of Waldron in Liberty Township, Shelby County, Indiana
- Coordinates: 39°29′51″N 85°40′3″W
- Area: less than one acre
- Built: 1875
- Architect: Meltzer Bros.
- Architectural style: Italianate, Gable-front
- NRHP reference No.: 92001170
- Added to NRHP: September 4, 1992

Liberty Township Schoolhouse No. 2 is a historic one-room school building located in Liberty Township, Shelby County, Indiana. It was built in 1875, and is a one-story, rectangular, Italianate style brick building. It has a steep gable-front roof and features heavy scroll brackets, a scalloped frieze, and oculus vent. Also on the property is a contributing water pump. It remained in use as a school until about 1919.

It was listed on the National Register of Historic Places in 1992.
