= Hanover Township, Indiana =

Hanover Township is the name of three townships in the U.S. state of Indiana:

- Hanover Township, Jefferson County, Indiana
- Hanover Township, Lake County, Indiana
- Hanover Township, Shelby County, Indiana
