= St. George Lutheran Church (Edinburgh, Indiana) =

Historic church in Indiana, United States

- U.S. National Register of Historic Places
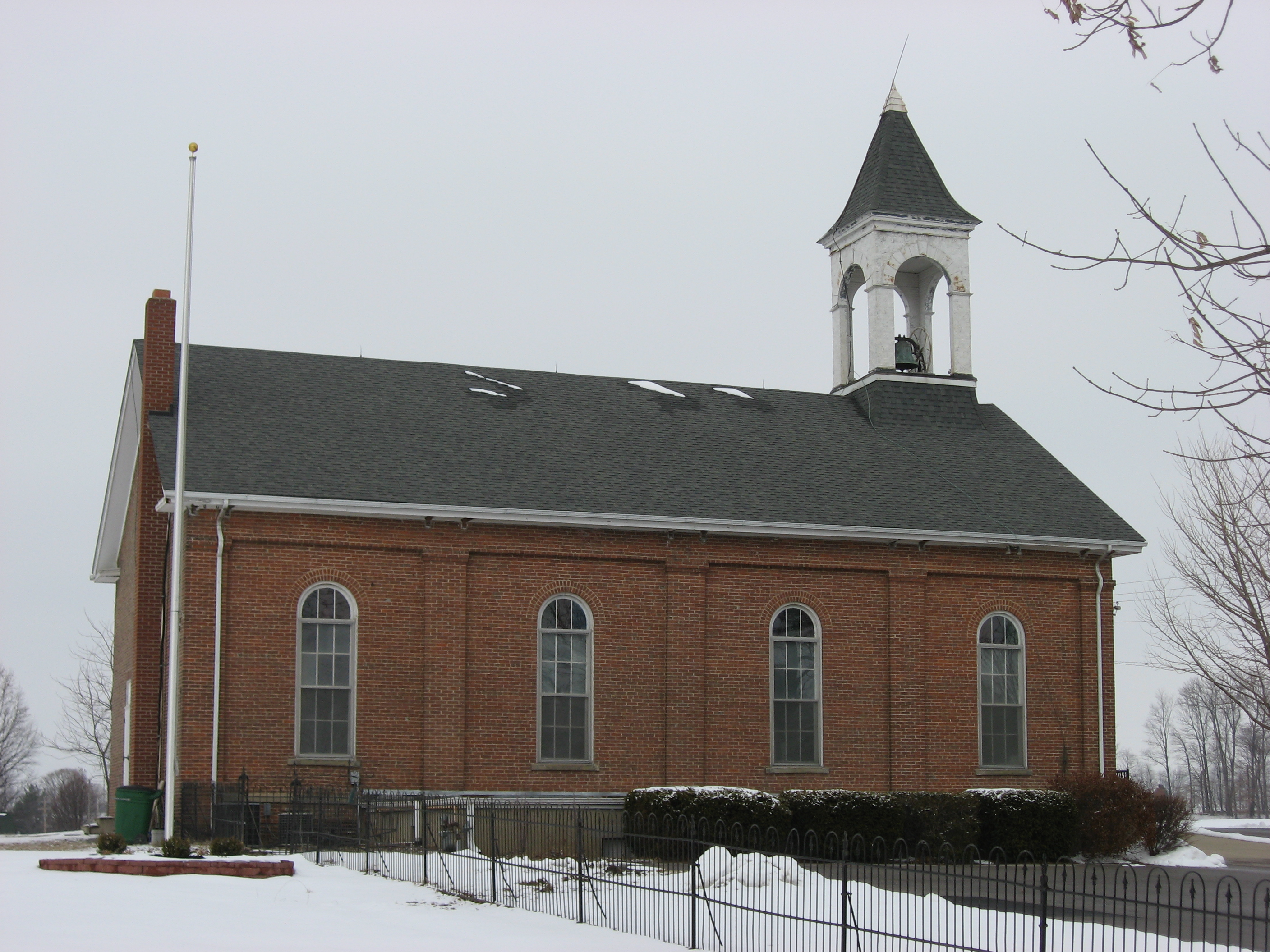
- St. George Lutheran Church, January 2011

- Location within Indiana
- Location: State Road 252, east of Edinburgh in Jackson Township, Shelby County, Indiana
- Coordinates: 39°21′51″N 85°53′41″W
- Area: less than one acre
- Built: 1867
- Architectural style: Greek Revival
- NRHP reference No.: 84001627
- Added to NRHP: May 24, 1984

St. George Lutheran Church is a historic Lutheran church located in Jackson Township, Shelby County, Indiana.

The congregation was established by Abraham Miller in 1838, meeting at first in George Warner's farmhouse. The first dedicated church was completed in 1844 on the current site. In 1867, the members sold the frame church to a Baptist group and pledged $5000 to build the current structure.

== Architecture ==
Completed in 1867, the current church is a one-story, rectangular, Greek Revival style building of local brick. It has a gable-front roof and features round-arched openings. The roof is topped by a square bell tower with a steeply pitched hipped roof; the bell was cast at the Buckeye Foundry in Cincinnati. The church's stained and etched glass windows were imported from Germany.

It was listed on the National Register of Historic Places in 1984.
