= Prescott, Indiana =

- Unincorporated community
- Location within Indiana Location within the United States
- Coordinates: 39°28′45″N 85°42′30″W
- Country: United States
- State: Indiana
- County: Shelby
- Township: Shelby
- Elevation: 840 ft (256 m)
- Time zone: UTC-5 (Eastern (EST))
  - Summer (DST): UTC-4 (EDT)
- ZIP code: 46176
- GNIS feature ID: 441576

Prescott is an unincorporated community in Shelby Township, Shelby County, in the U.S. state of Indiana.

== History ==
Prescott was laid out in 1867 when the railroad was extended to that point.

A post office was established at Prescott in 1860, and remained in operation until it was discontinued in 1905.

== Geography ==
Prescott is located at 39°28′45″N 85°42′30″W.
