= Liberty Township, Shelby County, Indiana =

Liberty Township
- Township
- Coordinates: 39°28′59″N 85°39′52″W
- Country: United States
- State: Indiana
- County: Shelby

Government
  - Type: Indiana township

Area
  - Total: 23.59 sq mi (61.1 km^{2})
  - Land: 23.58 sq mi (61.1 km^{2})
  - Water: 0.01 sq mi (0.026 km^{2})
- Elevation: 850 ft (259 m)

Population (2020)
  - Total: 1,777
  - Density: 75.2/sq mi (29.0/km^{2})
- FIPS code: 18-43398
- GNIS feature ID: 453561

Liberty Township is one of fourteen townships in Shelby County, Indiana. As of the 2010 census, its population was 1,772 and it contained 723 housing units.

== History ==
Liberty Township was established in 1840.

Liberty Township Schoolhouse No. 2 and Middletown Bridge are listed on the National Register of Historic Places.

== Geography ==
According to the 2010 census, the township has a total area of 23.59 square miles (61.1 km^{2}), of which 23.58 square miles (61.1 km^{2}) (or 99.96%) is land and 0.01 square miles (0.026 km^{2}) (or 0.04%) is water.

=== Unincorporated towns ===
- Blue Ridge
- Meltzer
- Middletown
- Waldron
