= Flat Rock, Indiana =

- Unincorporated community
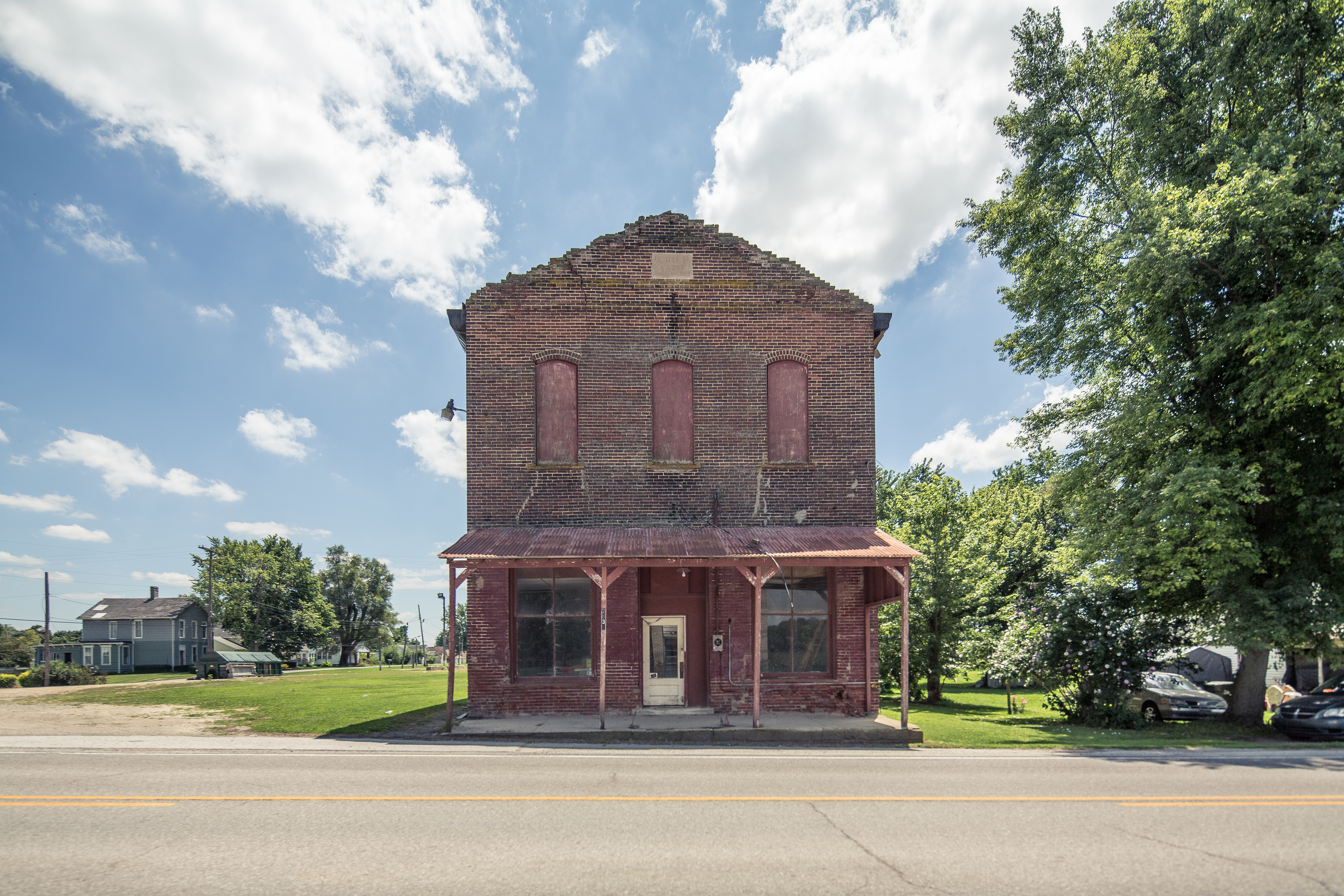

- Location within Indiana Location within the United States
- Coordinates: 39°21′43″N 85°49′53″W
- Country: United States
- State: Indiana
- County: Shelby
- Township: Washington
- Elevation: 689 ft (210 m)
- Time zone: UTC-5 (Eastern (EST))
  - Summer (DST): UTC-4 (EDT)
- ZIP code: 47234
- FIPS code: 18-23566
- GNIS feature ID: 2830528

Flat Rock is an unincorporated community in Washington Township, Shelby County, in the U.S. state of Indiana.

== History ==
Flat Rock was platted in 1855. It took its name from the Flatrock River. Its post office has operated since 1828.

It had its own high school, Flat Rock High School, which operated from 1893 until its closure in 1958 when the community became part of the Southwestern Consolidated School Corporation of Shelby County.

== Demographics ==
The United States Census Bureau first delineated Flat Rock as a census designated place in the 2022 American Community Survey.
