= Norristown, Indiana =

- Unincorporated community
- Location within Indiana Location within the United States
- Coordinates: 39°21′55″N 85°45′38″W
- Country: United States
- State: Indiana
- County: Shelby
- Township: Washington
- Elevation: 751 ft (229 m)
- Time zone: UTC-5 (Eastern (EST))
  - Summer (DST): UTC-4 (EDT)
- ZIP code: 47234
- GNIS feature ID: 440208

Norristown is an unincorporated community in Washington Township, Shelby County, in the U.S. state of Indiana.

== History ==
Norristown was platted in 1851, and named for James M. Norris, a local medical doctor.

== Geography ==
Norristown is located at 39°21′55″N 85°45′38″W.
