= Bengal, Indiana =

- Unincorporated community
- Location within Indiana Location within the United States
- Coordinates: 39°28′24″N 85°55′22″W
- Country: United States
- State: Indiana
- County: Shelby
- Township: Hendricks
- Elevation: 738 ft (225 m)
- Time zone: UTC-5 (Eastern (EST))
  - Summer (DST): UTC-4 (EDT)
- ZIP code: 46131
- GNIS feature ID: 430805

Bengal is an unincorporated community in Hendricks Township, Shelby County, in the U.S. state of Indiana.

== History ==
A post office was established at Bengal in 1881, and remained in operation until it was discontinued in 1902. The community most likely took its name from Bengal, in Asia. In the 1910s, Bengal had its own high school.
