= Brandywine Falls =

Brandywine Falls may refer to:

- Brandywine Falls, Ohio, United States
- Brandywine Falls Provincial Park, British Columbia, Canada

== See also ==
- Brandywine (disambiguation)
- Brandywine Creek (disambiguation)
