= Sleepy Hollow, Indiana =

- Unincorporated community
- Location within Indiana Location within the United States
- Coordinates: 39°23′48″N 85°43′01″W
- Country: United States
- State: Indiana
- County: Shelby
- Township: Noble
- Elevation: 741 ft (226 m)
- Time zone: UTC-5 (Eastern (EST))
  - Summer (DST): UTC-4 (EDT)
- ZIP code: 46182
- GNIS feature ID: 443601

Sleepy Hollow is an unincorporated community in Noble Township, Shelby County, in the U.S. state of Indiana.

== Geography ==
Sleepy Hollow is located at 39°23′48″N 85°43′01″W.
