= Pleasant View, Indiana =

- Unincorporated community and Census-designated place
- Location within Indiana Location within the United States
- Coordinates: 39°39′52″N 85°56′19″W
- Country: United States
- State: Indiana
- County: Shelby
- Township: Moral
- Elevation: 794 ft (242 m)
- Time zone: UTC-5 (Eastern (EST))
  - Summer (DST): UTC-4 (EDT)
- ZIP code: 46126
- GNIS feature ID: 2830535

Pleasant View is an unincorporated community in Moral Township, Shelby County, in the U.S. state of Indiana.

== History ==
Pleasant View was laid out and platted in 1836 as a stagecoach stop on the Michigan turnpike. Two old variant names of the community were Wrights and Doblestown. A post office was established under the name Wrights in 1828, and was renamed to Doblestown in 1837. It was renamed again to Pleasant View in 1841 and was discontinued in 1859.

== Demographics ==
The United States Census Bureau defined Pleasant View as a census designated place in the 2022 American Community Survey.
