= Fenns, Indiana =

- Unincorporated community
- Location within Indiana Location within the United States
- Coordinates: 39°27′27″N 85°47′52″W
- Country: United States
- State: Indiana
- County: Shelby
- Township: Shelby
- Elevation: 741 ft (226 m)
- Time zone: UTC-5 (Eastern (EST))
  - Summer (DST): UTC-4 (EDT)
- ZIP code: 46176
- GNIS feature ID: 434448

Fenns is an unincorporated community in Shelby Township, Shelby County, in the U.S. state of Indiana.

== History ==
Fenns once was a station and shipping point on the Pennsylvania Railroad.

A post office was established at Fenns in 1870, and remained in operation until it was discontinued in 1904.
