= Morven, Indiana =

- Unincorporated community
- Location within Indiana Location within the United States
- Coordinates: 39°25′16″N 85°39′40″W
- Country: United States
- State: Indiana
- County: Shelby
- Township: Noble
- Elevation: 830 ft (253 m)
- Time zone: UTC-5 (Eastern (EST))
  - Summer (DST): UTC-4 (EDT)
- ZIP code: 46182
- GNIS feature ID: 449037

Morven is an unincorporated community in Noble Township, Shelby County, in the U.S. state of Indiana.

== History ==
A post office opened at Morven in 1826, and remained in operation until it was discontinued in 1842. The community's name is a transfer from Scotland.
