= Middletown, Shelby County, Indiana =

Middletown
- Unincorporated town
- Location within Indiana Location within the United States
- Coordinates: 39°27′36″N 85°38′56″W
- Country: United States
- State: Indiana
- County: Shelby
- Township: Liberty
- Elevation: 840 ft (260 m)
- Time zone: UTC-5 (Eastern (EST))
  - Summer (DST): UTC-4 (EDT)
- ZIP code: 46182
- GNIS feature ID: 439116

Middletown is a defunct unincorporated town in Liberty Township, Shelby County, in the U.S. state of Indiana. It was platted in 1829 and had a population of nearly two hundred in 1875, but by 1910 was abandoned.
