= Marietta, Indiana =

- Unincorporated community and Census-designated place
- Location within Indiana Location within the United States
- Coordinates: 39°26′28″N 85°52′37″W
- Country: United States
- State: Indiana
- County: Shelby
- Township: Hendricks
- Elevation: 725 ft (221 m)
- Time zone: UTC-5 (Eastern (EST))
  - Summer (DST): UTC-4 (EDT)
- ZIP code: 46176
- FIPS code: 18-46782
- GNIS feature ID: 2830533

Marietta is an unincorporated community in Hendricks Township, Shelby County, in the U.S. state of Indiana.

== History ==
Marietta was platted in 1839. A post office was established at Marietta in 1848, and remained in operation until it was discontinued in 1904. Marietta once contained a high school which was discontinued at an unknown date.

== Demographics ==
The United States Census Bureau defined Marietta as a census designated place in the 2022 American Community Survey.
