= Brookfield, Indiana =

- Unincorporated community
- Location within Indiana Location within the United States
- Coordinates: 39°38′16″N 85°56′34″W
- Country: United States
- State: Indiana
- County: Shelby
- Township: Moral
- Elevation: 764 ft (233 m)
- Time zone: UTC-5 (Eastern (EST))
  - Summer (DST): UTC-4 (EDT)
- ZIP code: 46126
- GNIS feature ID: 431750

Brookfield is an unincorporated community in Moral Township, Shelby County, in the U.S. state of Indiana.

== History ==
Brookfield had its start in the early 1850s, when the railroad was extended to that point. A post office was established at Brookfield in 1859 and remained in operation until it was discontinued in 1904.
