= Lewis Creek, Indiana =

- Unincorporated community
- Location within Indiana Location within the United States
- Coordinates: 39°24′04″N 85°49′00″W
- Country: United States
- State: Indiana
- County: Shelby
- Township: Washington
- Elevation: 709 ft (216 m)
- Time zone: UTC-5 (Eastern (EST))
  - Summer (DST): UTC-4 (EDT)
- ZIP code: 47234
- GNIS feature ID: 449684

Lewis Creek is an unincorporated community in Washington Township, Shelby County, in the U.S. state of Indiana.

== History ==
Lewis Creek was founded in 1856. The community was a station and shipping point on the railroad.

A post office was established at Lewis Creek in 1861, and remained in operation until it was discontinued in 1931.

== Geography ==
Lewis Creek is located at 39°24′04″N 85°49′00″W.
