= Blue Ridge, Indiana =

- Unincorporated community and Census-designated place
- Location within Indiana Location within the United States
- Coordinates: 39°31′16″N 85°38′17″W
- Country: United States
- State: Indiana
- County: Shelby
- Township: Liberty
- Elevation: 892 ft (272 m)
- Time zone: UTC-5 (Eastern (EST))
  - Summer (DST): UTC-4 (EDT)
- ZIP code: 46182
- FIPS code: 18-6022
- GNIS feature ID: 2830525

Blue Ridge is an unincorporated community in Liberty Township, Shelby County, in the U.S. state of Indiana.

== History ==
Blue Ridge was originally called Cynthiana, and under the latter name was platted in 1835. A post office called Blue Ridge was established in 1847, and remained in operation until it was discontinued in 1907. Blue Ridge contained a school that was discontinued at an unknown date.

== Demographics ==
The United States Census Bureau delineated Blue Ridge as a census designated place in the 2022 American Community Survey.
