= Rays Crossing, Indiana =

- Unincorporated community
- Location within Indiana Location within the United States
- Coordinates: 39°33′16″N 85°40′09″W
- Country: United States
- State: Indiana
- County: Shelby
- Township: Union
- Elevation: 860 ft (262 m)
- Time zone: UTC-5 (Eastern (EST))
  - Summer (DST): UTC-4 (EDT)
- ZIP code: 46176
- GNIS feature ID: 441801

Rays Crossing is an unincorporated community in Union Township, Shelby County, in the U.S. state of Indiana.

== History ==
Rays Crossing had its start as a depot and shipping point on the railroad. The community has the name of the Ray family of settlers. A post office was established at Rays Crossing in 1870, and remained in operation until it was discontinued in 1943.

== Geography ==
Rays Crossing is located at 39°33′16″N 85°40′09″W.
