= Shelby Township, Shelby County, Indiana =

Shelby Township
- Township
- Coordinates: 39°28′03″N 85°46′08″W
- Country: United States
- State: Indiana
- County: Shelby

Government
  - Type: Indiana township

Area
  - Total: 28.98 sq mi (75.1 km^{2})
  - Land: 28.98 sq mi (75.1 km^{2})
  - Water: 0 sq mi (0 km^{2})
- Elevation: 758 ft (231 m)

Population (2020)
  - Total: 1,861
  - Density: 65.3/sq mi (25.2/km^{2})
- FIPS code: 18-69282
- GNIS feature ID: 453846

Shelby Township is one of fourteen townships in Shelby County, Indiana. As of the 2010 census, its population was 1,892 and it contained 771 housing units.

Shelby Township was organized in 1882. This township was named for the county in which it is located.

== Geography ==
According to the 2010 census, the township has a total area of 28.98 square miles (75.1 km^{2}), all land.

=== Cities and towns ===
- Shelbyville (southwest corner)

=== Unincorporated towns ===
- Fenns
- Prescott
- Wilson Corner
