= Mount Auburn, Shelby County, Indiana =

Mount Auburn
- Unincorporated community
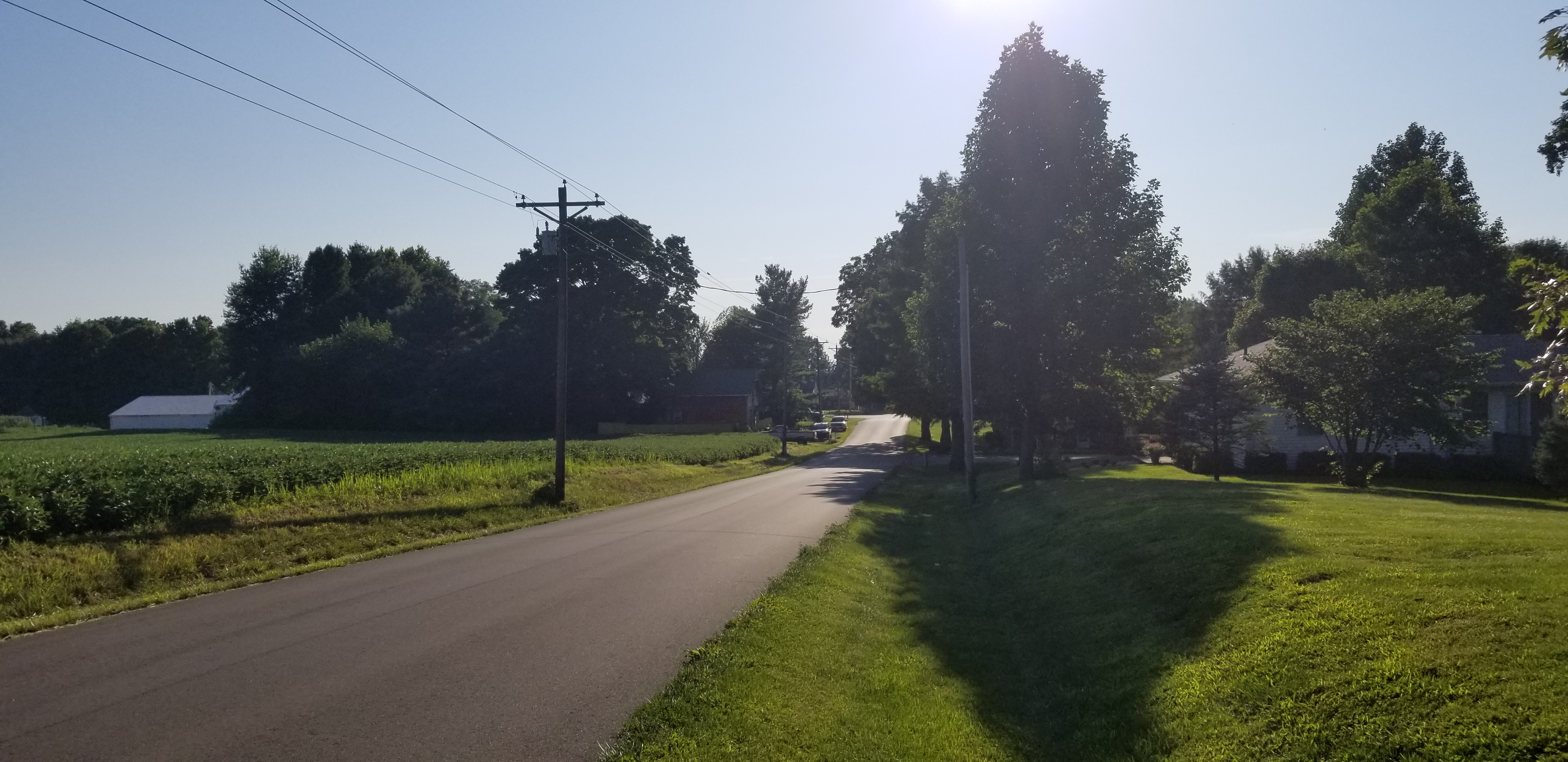

- Location within Indiana Location within the United States
- Coordinates: 39°23′33″N 85°53′37″W
- Country: United States
- State: Indiana
- County: Shelby
- Township: Jackson
- Elevation: 820 ft (250 m)
- Time zone: UTC-5 (Eastern (EST))
  - Summer (DST): UTC-4 (EDT)
- ZIP code: 46124
- FIPS code: 18-51300
- GNIS feature ID: 439520

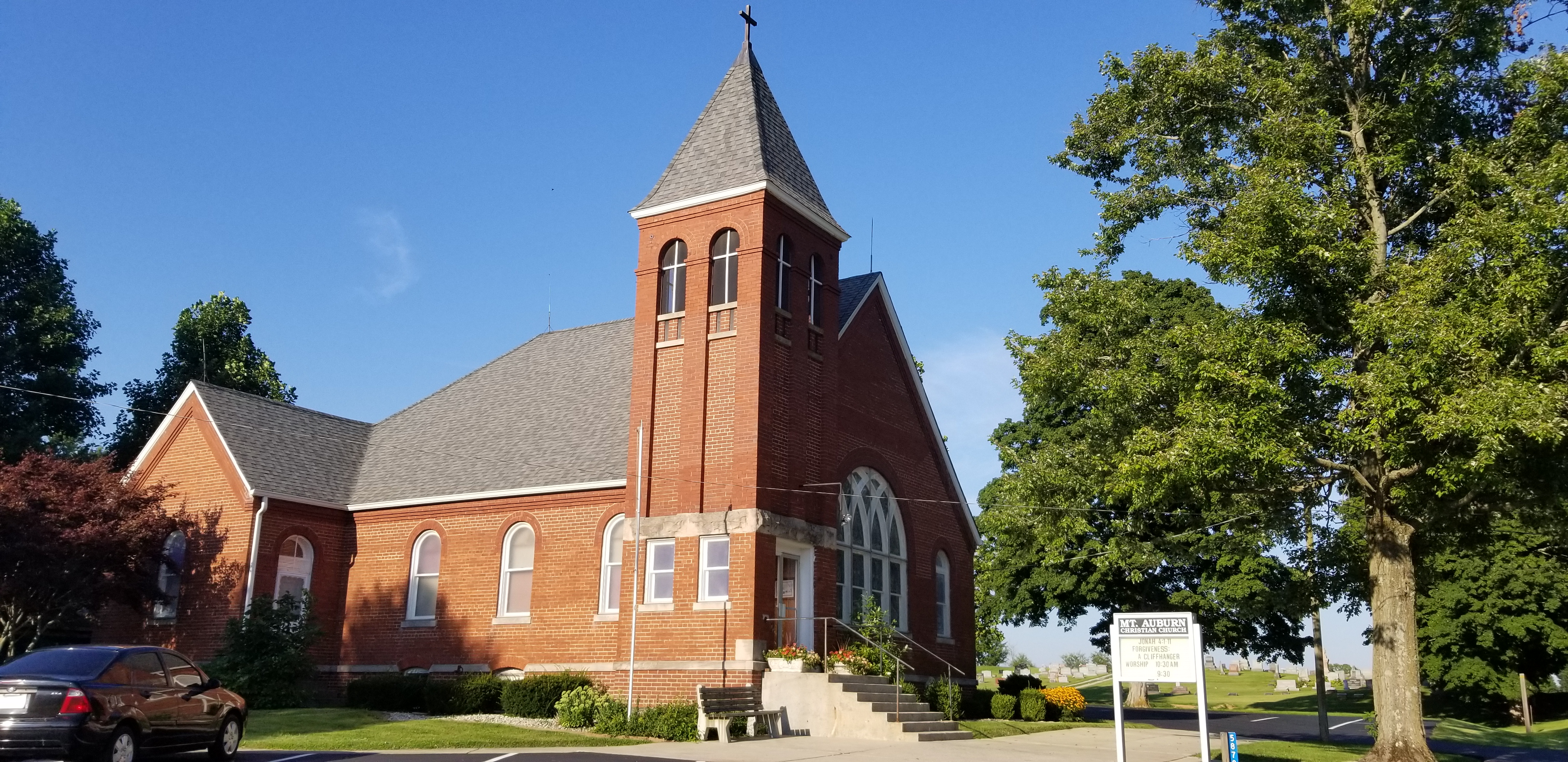
Church in Mt. Auburn

Mount Auburn is an unincorporated community in Jackson Township, Shelby County, in the U.S. state of Indiana.

== History ==
Mount Auburn was laid out and platted in 1837. An old variant name of the community was called Black Hawk.

A post office was established under the name Black Hawk in 1838, was renamed to Mount Auburn in 1844, and operated until it was discontinued in 1905.

Mount Auburn once contained a school which was in operation by at least 1884. The school was later established as Mt. Auburn High School in 1891 until its closure in 1958 when Mount Auburn became part of the Southwestern Consolidated School Corporation of Shelby County, IN.

== Geography ==
Mount Auburn is located at 39°23′33″N 85°53′37″W, at the geographical center of Jackson Township, twelve miles southwest of Shelbyville, and five miles northeast of Edinburgh in Johnson County.
