= Freeport, Indiana =

- Unincorporated community
- Location within Indiana Location within the United States
- Coordinates: 39°39′31″N 85°43′33″W
- Country: United States
- State: Indiana
- County: Shelby
- Township: Hanover
- Elevation: 810 ft (247 m)
- Time zone: UTC-5 (Eastern (EST))
  - Summer (DST): UTC-4 (EDT)
- ZIP code: 46161
- GNIS feature ID: 434821

Freeport is an unincorporated community in Hanover Township, Shelby County, in the U.S. state of Indiana.

== History ==
Freeport was platted in 1836. The community was so named for its status as a shipping point. A post office was established at Freeport in 1837, and remained in operation until it was discontinued in 1902.

== Geography ==
Freeport is located at 39°39′31″N 85°43′33″W.
