= Hendricks Township, Shelby County, Indiana =

Hendricks Township
- Township
- Coordinates: 39°29′06″N 85°53′38″W
- Country: United States
- State: Indiana
- County: Shelby

Government
  - Type: Indiana township

Area
  - Total: 36.58 sq mi (94.7 km^{2})
  - Land: 36.37 sq mi (94.2 km^{2})
  - Water: 0.21 sq mi (0.54 km^{2})
- Elevation: 728 ft (222 m)

Population (2020)
  - Total: 1,231
  - Density: 35.4/sq mi (13.7/km^{2})
- FIPS code: 18-33070
- GNIS feature ID: 453405

Hendricks Township is one of fourteen townships in Shelby County, Indiana, United States. As of the 2010 census, its population was 1,286 and it contained 517 housing units.

The township bears the name of Governor William Hendricks.

== Geography ==
According to the 2010 census, the township has a total area of 36.58 square miles (94.7 km^{2}), of which 36.37 square miles (94.2 km^{2}) (or 99.43%) is land and 0.21 square miles (0.54 km^{2}) (or 0.57%) is water.

=== Unincorporated towns ===
- Bengal
- Smithland
- Marietta
