= Middletown Bridge =

- U.S. National Register of Historic Places
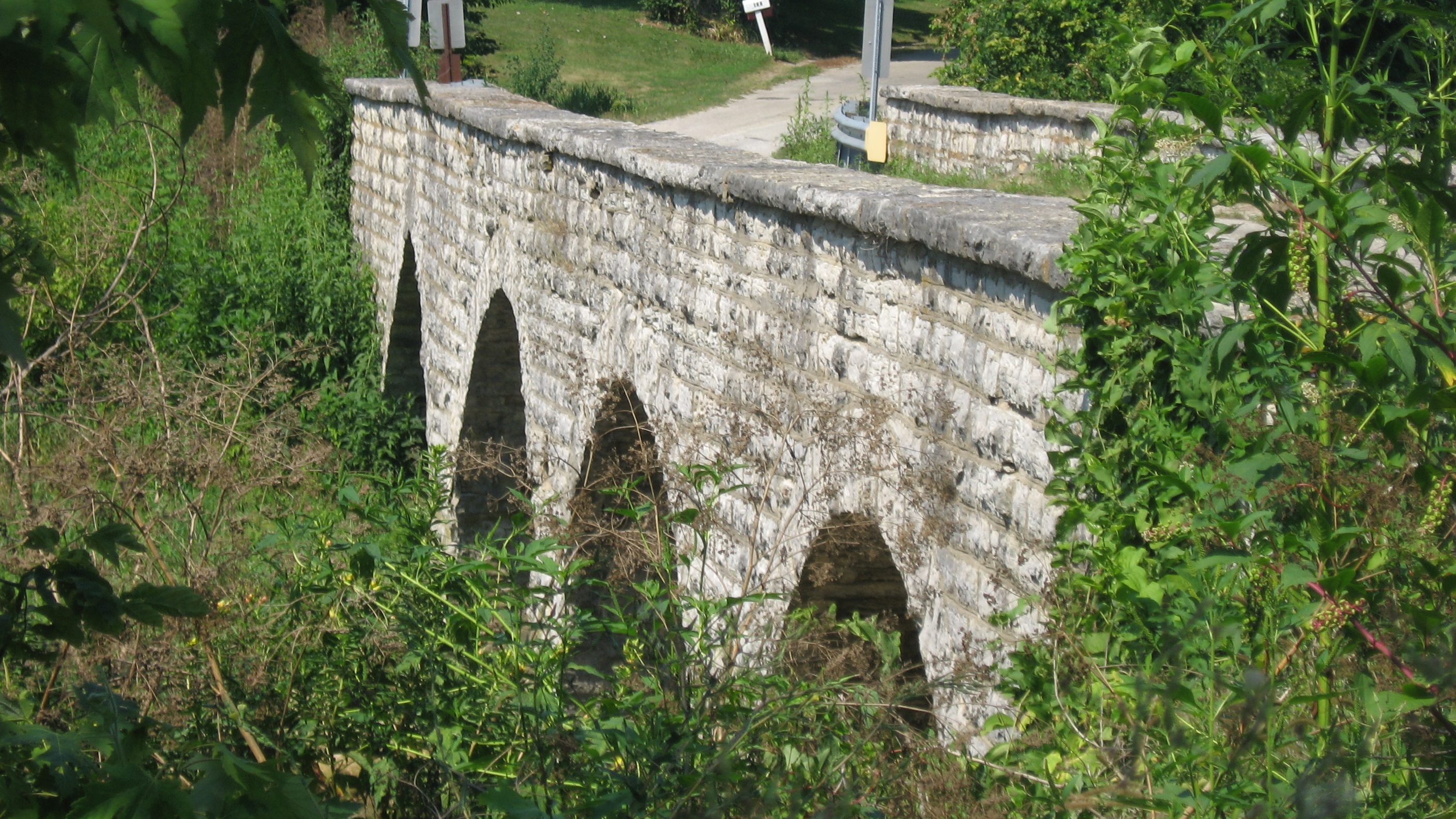
- Middletown Bridge, August 2011

- Location within Indiana Location within the United States
- Location: County Road 450S over Conn's Creek, northwest of Middletown in Liberty Township, Shelby County, Indiana
- Coordinates: 39°27′44″N 85°39′06″W
- Area: less than one acre
- Built: 1903
- Built by: Avery, William
- Architectural style: stone arch bridge
- NRHP reference No.: 09001135
- Added to NRHP: December 24, 2009

Middletown Bridge, also known as Shelby County Bridge #149, is a historic stone arch bridge located in Liberty Township, Shelby County, Indiana. It was built in 1903, and is a four-arch bridge constructed of Indiana limestone. It measures 140.8 feet long and 20 feet wide, including the parapet walls. The bridge was torn down by the county in the summer of 2018.

It was listed on the National Register of Historic Places in 2009.
