= Smithland, Indiana =

- Unincorporated community
- Location within Indiana Location within the United States
- Coordinates: 39°27′37″N 85°50′48″W
- Country: United States
- State: Indiana
- County: Shelby
- Township: Hendricks
- Elevation: 732 ft (223 m)
- Time zone: UTC-5 (Eastern (EST))
  - Summer (DST): UTC-4 (EDT)
- ZIP code: 46176
- GNIS feature ID: 443707

Smithland is an unincorporated community in Hendricks Township, Shelby County, in the U.S. state of Indiana.

== History ==
Smithland was platted in 1851 by Hezekiah Smith, and named for him.

A post office was established at Smithland in 1853, and remained in operation until it was discontinued in 1901.
