= Moral Township, Shelby County, Indiana =

Moral Township
- Township
- Coordinates: 39°38′56″N 85°53′32″W
- Country: United States
- State: Indiana
- County: Shelby

Government
  - Type: Indiana township

Area
  - Total: 36.7 sq mi (95 km^{2})
  - Land: 36.56 sq mi (94.7 km^{2})
  - Water: 0.14 sq mi (0.36 km^{2})
- Elevation: 794 ft (242 m)

Population (2020)
  - Total: 4,617
  - Density: 125.2/sq mi (48.3/km^{2})
- FIPS code: 18-50994
- GNIS feature ID: 453652

Moral Township is one of fourteen townships in Shelby County, Indiana. As of the 2010 census, its population was 4,577 and it contained 1,805 housing units.

Moral Township was organized before 1840.

== Geography ==
According to the 2010 census, the township has a total area of 36.7 square miles (95 km^{2}), of which 36.56 square miles (94.7 km^{2}) (or 99.62%) is land and 0.14 square miles (0.36 km^{2}) (or 0.38%) is water.

== History ==
On September 9, 1969, Moral Township was the site of the deadliest air disaster in the history of Indiana. On that date, Allegheny Airlines flight 853, a McDonnell Douglas DC-9-31 jetliner, registration N988VJ, collided in midair with a Piper PA-28 registration N7374J which was a light general aviation aircraft. After the collision, flight 853 rolled over and crashed into a soybean field near London, Indiana at over 430 mph; none of the 82 people on board survived. The pilot and sole occupant of the PA-28 were killed upon impact with the tail assembly of the DC-9. With a death toll of 83, this is the deadliest aviation disaster in the history of Indiana.

=== Unincorporated towns ===
- Brookfield
- Green Meadows
- London
- Pleasant View
- Sugar Creek
