= Pleasure Valley, Indiana =

- Unincorporated community
- Location within Indiana Location within the United States
- Coordinates: 39°24′05″N 85°42′31″W
- Country: United States
- State: Indiana
- County: Shelby
- Township: Noble
- Elevation: 761 ft (232 m)
- Time zone: UTC-5 (Eastern (EST))
  - Summer (DST): UTC-4 (EDT)
- ZIP code: 46182
- GNIS feature ID: 441357

Pleasure Valley is an unincorporated community in Noble Township, Shelby County, in the U.S. state of Indiana.

Located on the north bank of Flatrock River, many of the original summer cottages have been converted to year-round residences.
