= Jackson Township, Shelby County, Indiana =

US township

Jackson Township
- Township
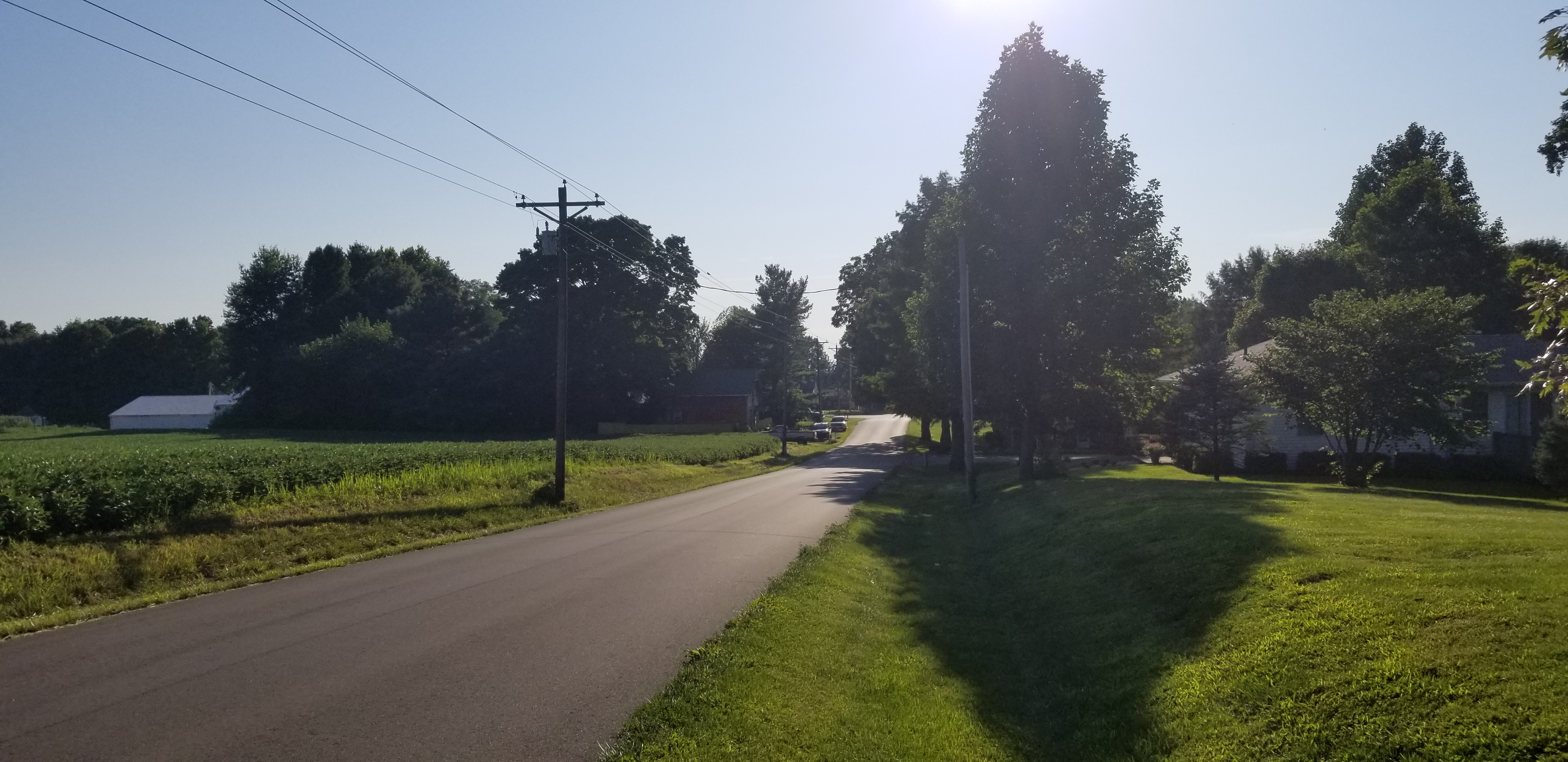
- Mt. Auburn Indiana is near the center of Jackson Township

- Coordinates: 39°23′50″N 85°53′56″W
- Country: United States
- State: Indiana
- County: Shelby

Government
  - Type: Indiana township

Area
  - Total: 34.27 sq mi (88.8 km^{2})
  - Land: 34.08 sq mi (88.3 km^{2})
  - Water: 0.18 sq mi (0.47 km^{2})
- Elevation: 781 ft (238 m)

Population (2020)
  - Total: 1,981
  - Density: 54.1/sq mi (20.9/km^{2})
- FIPS code: 18-37404
- GNIS feature ID: 453466

Jackson Township is one of fourteen townships in Shelby County, Indiana. As of the 2010 census, its population was 1,844 and it contained 738 housing units.

== History ==
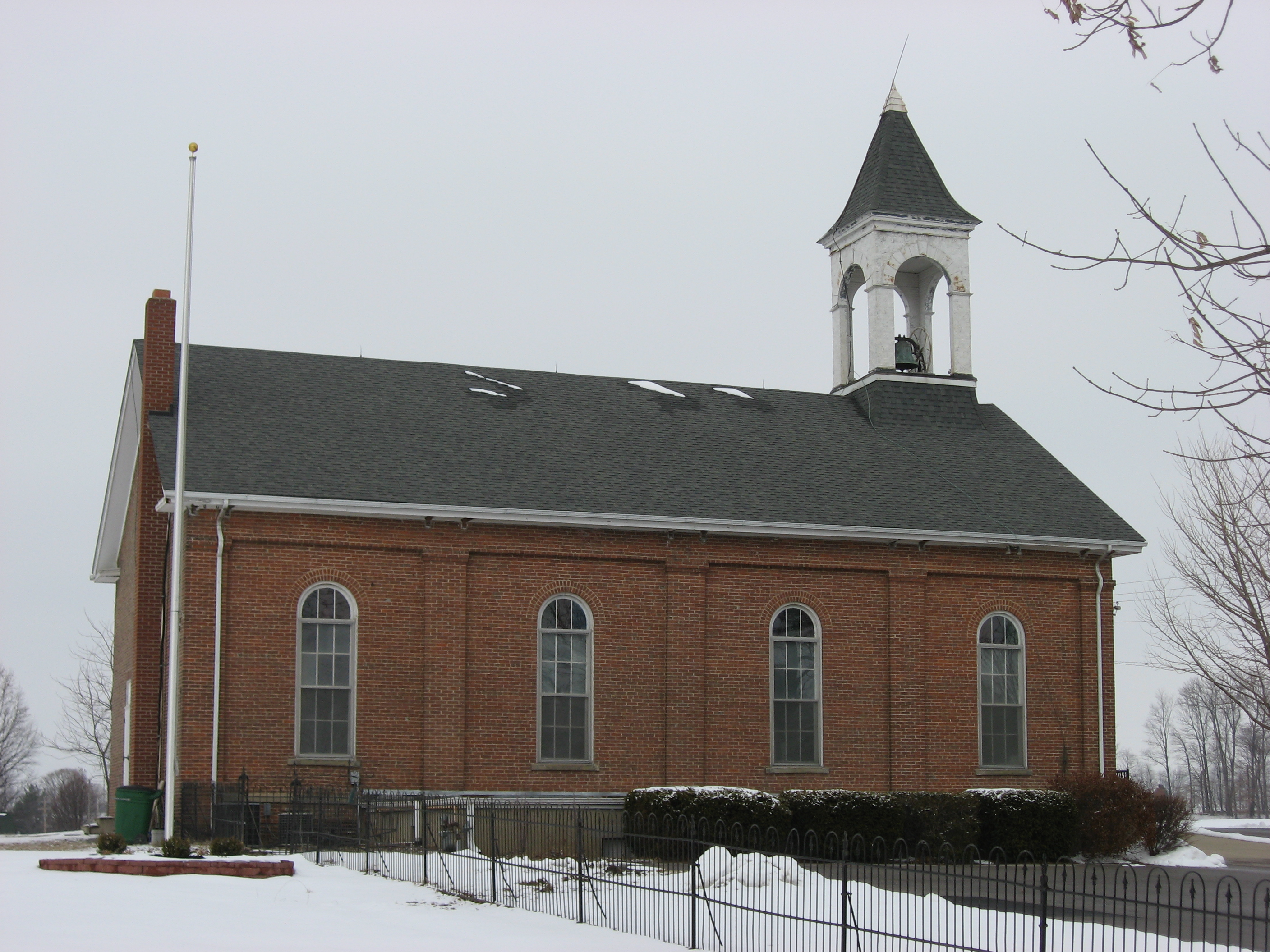
St. George Lutheran Church, January 2011.

Jackson Township was established in 1840.

St. George Lutheran Church was listed on the National Register of Historic Places in 1984.

== Geography ==
According to the 2010 census, the township has a total area of 34.27 square miles (88.8 km^{2}), of which 34.08 square miles (88.3 km^{2}) (or 99.45%) is land and 0.18 square miles (0.47 km^{2}) (or 0.53%) is water.

=== Cities and towns ===
- Edinburgh (partial)

=== Unincorporated towns ===
- Mount Auburn
