= Noble Township, Shelby County, Indiana =

Noble Township
- Township
- Coordinates: 39°23′25″N 85°40′44″W
- Country: United States
- State: Indiana
- County: Shelby

Government
  - Type: Indiana township

Area
  - Total: 36.32 sq mi (94.1 km^{2})
  - Land: 36.29 sq mi (94.0 km^{2})
  - Water: 0.03 sq mi (0.078 km^{2})
- Elevation: 820 ft (250 m)

Population (2020)
  - Total: 1,390
  - Density: 40.9/sq mi (15.8/km^{2})
- FIPS code: 18-54144
- GNIS feature ID: 453674

Noble Township is one of fourteen townships in Shelby County, Indiana. As of the 2010 census, its population was 1,486 and it contained 668 housing units.

== History ==
Noble Township was established before 1840.

Cooper-Alley House and George Rudicel Polygonal Barn are listed on the National Register of Historic Places.

== Geography ==
According to the 2010 census, the township has a total area of 36.32 square miles (94.1 km^{2}), of which 36.29 square miles (94.0 km^{2}) (or 99.92%) is land and 0.03 square miles (0.078 km^{2}) (or 0.08%) is water.

=== Cities and towns ===
- St. Paul (partial)

=== Unincorporated towns ===
- Geneva
- Morven
- Pleasure Valley
- Sleepy Hollow
