= Meltzer, Indiana =

- Unincorporated community
- Location within Indiana Location within the United States
- Coordinates: 39°31′09″N 85°40′06″W
- Country: United States
- State: Indiana
- County: Shelby
- Township: Liberty
- Elevation: 850 ft (260 m)
- Time zone: UTC-5 (Eastern (EST))
  - Summer (DST): UTC-4 (EDT)
- ZIP code: 46176
- GNIS feature ID: 438977

Meltzer is an unincorporated community in Liberty Township, Shelby County, in the U.S. state of Indiana.

== History ==
A post office was established at Meltzer in 1880, and remained in operation until it was discontinued in 1905. The community has the name of a family of settlers.

== Geography ==
Meltzer is located at 39°31′09″N 85°40′06″W.
