= Hanover Township, Shelby County, Indiana =

Hanover Township
- Township
- Coordinates: 39°40′09″N 85°40′44″W
- Country: United States
- State: Indiana
- County: Shelby

Government
  - Type: Indiana township

Area
  - Total: 27.33 sq mi (70.8 km^{2})
  - Land: 27.21 sq mi (70.5 km^{2})
  - Water: 0.12 sq mi (0.31 km^{2})
- Elevation: 883 ft (269 m)

Population (2020)
  - Total: 2,226
  - Density: 83.9/sq mi (32.4/km^{2})
- FIPS code: 18-31270
- GNIS feature ID: 453372

Hanover Township is one of fourteen townships in Shelby County, Indiana. As of the 2010 census, its population was 2,283 and it contained 962 housing units.

Hanover Township was organized before 1840.

== Geography ==
According to the 2010 census, the township has a total area of 27.33 square miles (70.8 km^{2}), of which 27.21 square miles (70.5 km^{2}) (or 99.56%) is land and 0.12 square miles (0.31 km^{2}) (or 0.44%) is water.

=== Cities and towns ===
- Morristown

=== Unincorporated towns ===
- Freeport
- Gwynneville
