= Gwynneville, Indiana =

- Unincorporated community
- Location within Indiana Location within the United States
- Coordinates: 39°39′43″N 85°38′57″W
- Country: United States
- State: Indiana
- County: Shelby
- Township: Hanover
- Elevation: 909 ft (277 m)
- Time zone: UTC-5 (Eastern (EST))
  - Summer (DST): UTC-4 (EDT)
- ZIP code: 46144
- FIPS code: 18-30294
- GNIS feature ID: 2830531

Gwynneville is an unincorporated community in Hanover Township, Shelby County, in the U.S. state of Indiana.

== History ==
Gwynneville was platted in 1881, and named after O'Brien Gynne, a local businessman and landowner. A post office opened at Gwynneville in 1881. Gwynneville had its own high school until the school was discontinued around 1918.

== Demographics ==
The United States Census Bureau delineated Gwynneville as a census designated place in the 2022 American Community Survey.
