= Brandywine Township, Shelby County, Indiana =

Brandywine Township
- Township
- Coordinates: 39°34′56″N 85°50′20″W
- Country: United States
- State: Indiana
- County: Shelby

Government
  - Type: Indiana township

Area
  - Total: 22.31 sq mi (57.8 km^{2})
  - Land: 22.2 sq mi (57 km^{2})
  - Water: 0.11 sq mi (0.28 km^{2})
- Elevation: 761 ft (232 m)

Population (2020)
  - Total: 1,898
  - Density: 90.8/sq mi (35.1/km^{2})
- FIPS code: 18-07102
- GNIS feature ID: 453134

Brandywine Township is one of fourteen townships in Shelby County, Indiana. According to the 2010 census, its population was 2,015 and had 843 housing units.

Brandywine Township was founded in 1843.

== Geography ==
According to the 2010 census, the township has a total area of 22.31 square miles (57.8 km^{2}), of which 22.2 square miles (57 km^{2}) (or 99.51%) is land and 0.11 square miles (0.28 km^{2}) (or 0.49%) is water.

The township contains Brandywine Creek.

=== Cities and towns ===
- Fairland
- Shelbyville (part)

=== Unincorporated towns ===
- Clover Village
