= Washington Township, Shelby County, Indiana =

Washington Township
- Township
- Coordinates: 39°24′06″N 85°47′39″W
- Country: United States
- State: Indiana
- County: Shelby

Government
  - Type: Indiana township

Area
  - Total: 34.76 sq mi (90.0 km^{2})
  - Land: 34.76 sq mi (90.0 km^{2})
  - Water: 0 sq mi (0 km^{2})
- Elevation: 732 ft (223 m)

Population (2020)
  - Total: 1,223
  - Density: 35.6/sq mi (13.7/km^{2})
- FIPS code: 18-81044
- GNIS feature ID: 454019

Washington Township is one of fourteen townships in Shelby County, Indiana. As of the 2010 census, its population was 1,237 and it contained 520 housing units.

Washington Township was organized in 1845.

== Geography ==
According to the 2010 census, the township has a total area of 34.76 square miles (90.0 km^{2}), all land.

=== Unincorporated towns ===
- Flat Rock
- Lewis Creek
- Norristown
