= Edith Jones Woodward =

American astronomer and professor

- Edith Jones Woodward, from a 1964 newspaper photo.
- Born: Edith Jones; August 15, 1914; Waldron, Indiana
- Died: January 21, 2002 (aged 87)
- Occupations: astronomer, educator

Edith Jones Woodward (August 15, 1914 – January 21, 2002) was an American astronomer and college professor. She did research on binary stars, and taught at William Paterson College in New Jersey for over twenty years.

== Early life ==
Edith Jones was born in Waldron, Indiana, the daughter of James Raymond Jones and Mary "Madge" Yeager Jones. She attended Purdue University, earning a bachelor's of science in 1935. She won the Flora Roberts Medal as "outstanding senior woman" in her class at Purdue. She earned a PhD in astronomy from Harvard University in 1941, where she held a Pickering Fellowship in 1936 and worked with Harlow Shapley and Cecilia Payne-Gaposchkin.

== Career ==
Edith Jones Woodward taught astronomy, mathematics, and geology for more than 40 years, at Mount Holyoke College (1938 to 1940), Hunter College (1951 to 1952), and as a professor at William Paterson College (1959 to 1983). She also taught math to high school students, from 1956 to 1959, and astronomy at National Science Foundations summer programs for teachers in 1961, and for selected high school students in 1964. Based on her teaching experience, she published a textbook, Elementary Concepts of Sets (1959), and addressed the 1960 meeting of the Science-Mathematics Society of New Jersey.

She attended the American Astronomical Society meeting in 1974, in Gainesville, Florida. From 1973 to 1975, she held a grant from the National Science Foundation for research at Kitt Peak National Observatory. During that work, she also traveled to Chile three times for NASA, to visit Cerro Tololo Inter-American Observatory. In 1980 she won a NASA grant to fund work at the Harvard College Observatory on projects involving eclipses of binary stars.

Woodward was active for many years in the League of Women Voters and the American Association of University Women. In 1972, she was a delegate to the Democratic National Convention. She was also a serious bridge player, and the first woman to win the President's Trophy in a bridge tournament at the Harvard Club of New York.

== Publications ==
Woodward's scientific publications included "A study of four W Ursae Majoris stars" (Harvard College Observatory Circular 1942), "A photometric analysis of the supergiant close binary V453 Scorpii" (Publications of the Astronomical Society of the Pacific 1975, with Robert H. Koch), "AK Herculis — An atypical W UMa-type system" (Astrophysics and Space Science 1977, with R. E. Wilson), "U, B, V light curves of CO Lacertae" (Astrophysics and Space Science 1983, with R. E. Wilson), "Old and new observations of V523 Saggitarii" (Astronomical Journal 1989, with Robert H. Koch), and "Analyses of photoelectric light curves of YY Sagittarii" (Astronomical Journal 1992, with Robert H. Koch).

== Personal life ==
Edith Jones married William Redin Woodward, a patent attorney, in 1940. They had three children, James, Barbara, and Paul. Edith J. Woodward died in 2002, aged 87 years. Her elder son James F. Woodward became a historian of science and an adjunct physics professor at California State University, Fullerton. Her younger son Paul R. Woodward became a mathematician and astrophysicist who taught at the University of Minnesota. The American Astronomical Society presents an Edith J. Woodward Award, named in her memory.
