= Brandywine Creek (St. Joseph River tributary) =

Stream in Michigan, U.S.

Coordinates: 41°48′34″N 86°15′50″W

Brandywine Creek is a stream in the U.S. state of Michigan. It is a tributary to the St. Joseph River.

The stream takes its name from the Brandywine Creek which flows through Delaware and Pennsylvania.
