= Union Township, Shelby County, Indiana =

Union Township
- Township
- Coordinates: 39°34′41″N 85°40′11″W
- Country: United States
- State: Indiana
- County: Shelby

Government
  - Type: Indiana township

Area
  - Total: 26.83 sq mi (69.5 km^{2})
  - Land: 26.76 sq mi (69.3 km^{2})
  - Water: 0.07 sq mi (0.18 km^{2})
- Elevation: 883 ft (269 m)

Population (2020)
  - Total: 920
  - Density: 36.3/sq mi (14.0/km^{2})
- FIPS code: 18-77642
- GNIS feature ID: 453934

Union Township is one of fourteen townships in Shelby County, Indiana. As of the 2010 census, its population was 970 and it contained 395 housing units.

Union Township was organized in 1822 and reorganized with its present borders in 1840.

== Geography ==
According to the 2010 census, the township has a total area of 26.83 square miles (69.5 km^{2}), of which 26.76 square miles (69.3 km^{2}) (or 99.74%) is land and 0.07 square miles (0.18 km^{2}) (or 0.26%) is water.

=== Unincorporated towns ===
- Rays Crossing
