= Shelby County, Indiana =

County in Indiana, United States

- County
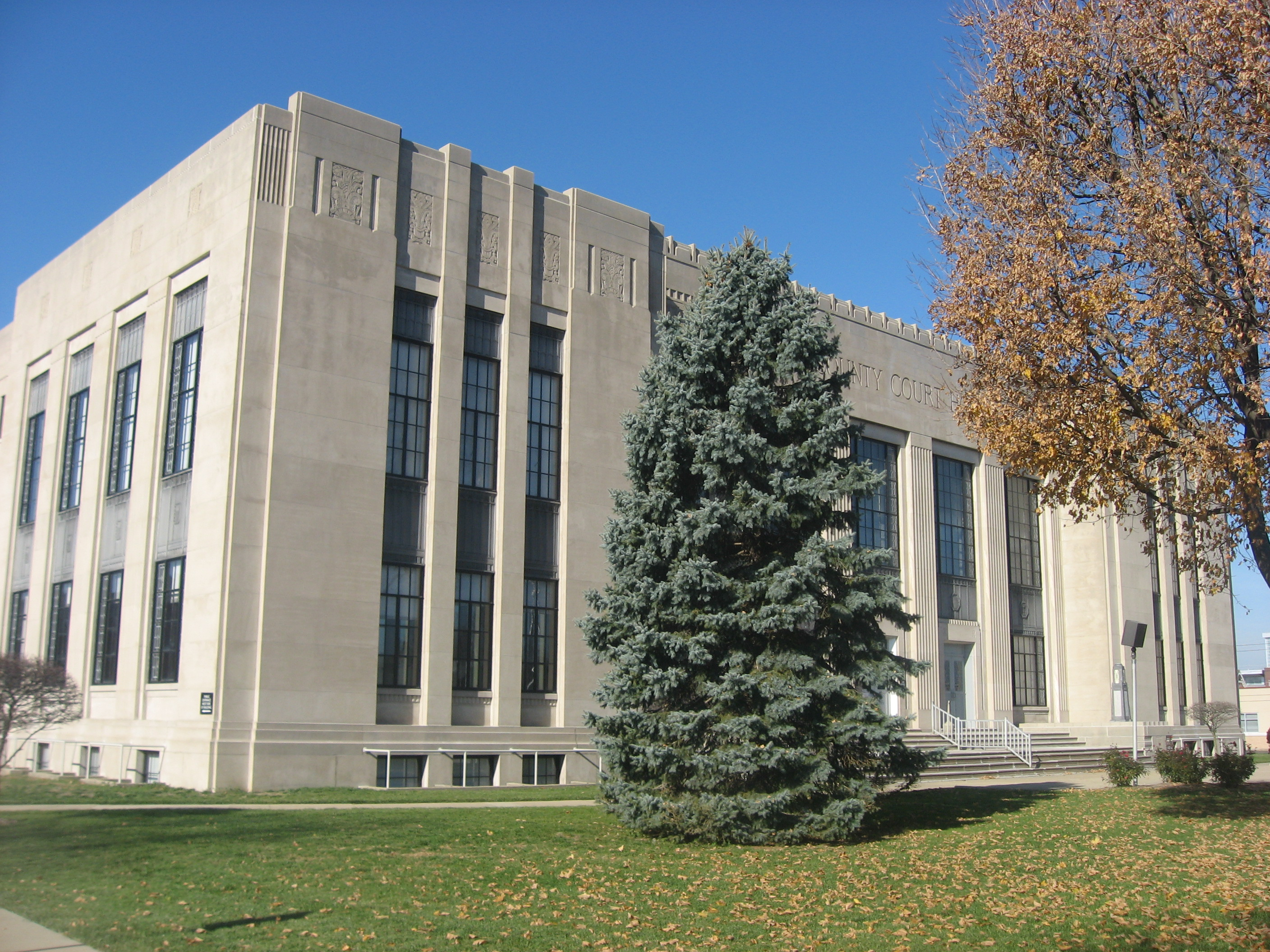
- Shelby County Courthouse in Shelbyville

- Location within the U.S. state of Indiana
- Coordinates: 39°31′N 85°47′W
- Country: United States
- State: Indiana
- Founded: December 31, 1821 (authorized); 1822 (organized)
- Named for: Isaac Shelby
- Seat: Shelbyville
- Largest city: Shelbyville

Area
  - Total: 412.76 sq mi (1,069.0 km^{2})
  - Land: 411.15 sq mi (1,064.9 km^{2})
  - Water: 1.61 sq mi (4.2 km^{2}) 0.39%

Population (2020)
  - Total: 45,055
  - Estimate (2025): 45,882 ▲
  - Density: 109.58/sq mi (42.310/km^{2})
- Time zone: UTC−5 (Eastern)
  - Summer (DST): UTC−4 (EDT)
- Congressional district: 6th
- Website: www.in.gov/counties/shelby/
- Indiana county number 73

Shelby County is a county in the U.S. state of Indiana. As of the 2020 United States census, the population was 45,055. The county seat (and only incorporated city) is Shelbyville.

== History ==
After the American Revolutionary War established US sovereignty over the territory of the upper midwest, the new federal government defined the Northwest Territory in 1787, which included the area of present-day Indiana. In 1800, Congress separated Ohio from the Northwest Territory, designating the rest of the land as the Indiana Territory. President Thomas Jefferson chose William Henry Harrison as the governor of the territory, and Vincennes was established as the capital. After the Michigan Territory was separated and the Illinois Territory was formed, Indiana was reduced to its current size and geography. By December 1816 the Indiana Territory was admitted to the Union as a state.

The Native people who inhabited these areas prior to arrival of European settlers were generally resistant to the loss of their lands. As settlers pushed into the area, treaties signed by some leaders with United States representatives ceded large areas of their territory to the US. Starting in 1794, Native American titles to Indiana lands were extinguished by usurpation, purchase, or war and treaty. The United States acquired land from the Native Americans in the 1809 treaty of Fort Wayne, and by the treaty of St. Mary's in 1818, which included the future Shelby County.

The Indiana State Legislature passed a bill on December 31, 1821, that authorized the creation of four counties, including Shelby. On July 1, 1822, the county was organized, beginning with selecting a site for the county seat.

The new county was named for Gen. Isaac Shelby, who defeated the British at the Battle of Kings Mountain in the Revolutionary War. Shelby then became the first Governor of Kentucky. During the War of 1812, he led the army of Kentucky into Canada, and defeated the British at the decisive Battle of the Thames in 1813.

== Geography ==
The low, rolling hills of Shelby County are lightly carved by drainages, but are otherwise completely devoted to agriculture or urban development. The western edge of the county is drained by Sugar Creek, flowing south-southwestward into Johnson County. The central and SW parts of the county are drained by Big Blue River, flowing south-southwestward into Johnson County. The lower part of the county is drained by Flatrock River and its tributary, Conns Creek, flowing southwestward into Bartholomew County. The terrain slopes to the southwest, with its highest elevations (930 feet/280 meters ASL) along the eastern part of its northern border with Hancock County. According to the 2010 census, the county has a total area of 412.76 square miles (1,069.0 km^{2}), of which 411.15 square miles (1,064.9 km^{2}) (or 99.61%) is land and 1.61 square miles (4.2 km^{2}) (or 0.39%) is water.

=== City and towns ===
- Edinburgh (part)
- Fairland
- Morristown
- St. Paul (part)
- Shelbyville (city/county seat)

=== Unincorporated communities ===
- Beech Brook
- Bengal
- Blue Ridge
- Boggstown
- Brookfield
- Candleglo Village
- Clover Village
- Fenns
- Flat Rock
- Fountaintown
- Freeport
- Geneva
- Green Meadows
- Gwynneville
- Knighthood Grove
- Knighthood Village
- Lewis Creek
- London
- Marietta
- Marion
- Meltzer
- Middletown
- Morven
- Mount Auburn
- Norristown
- Pleasant View
- Pleasure Valley
- Prescott
- Rays Crossing
- Rolling Ridge
- Sleepy Hollow
- Smithland
- Sugar Creek
- Waldron (census-designated place)
- Walkerville
- Wilson Corner

=== Townships ===
- Addison
- Brandywine
- Hanover
- Hendricks
- Jackson
- Liberty
- Marion
- Moral
- Noble
- Shelby
- Sugar Creek
- Union
- Van Buren
- Washington

=== Adjacent counties ===
- Hancock County - north
- Rush County - east
- Decatur County - southeast
- Bartholomew County - south
- Johnson County - west
- Marion County - northwest

=== Major highways ===
- Interstate 65
- Interstate 74
- U.S. Route 52
- U.S. Route 421
- Indiana State Road 9
- Indiana State Road 44
- Indiana State Road 244
- Indiana State Road 252

== Climate and weather ==
Shelbyville, Indiana

Climate chart (precipitation, max. and min. temperature)
J	F	M	A	M	J	J	A	S	O	N	D
2.4 35 18	2.4 40 22	3.4 51 31	3.9 63 41	4.5 73 52	3.9 82 61	4 86 65	3.5 84 63	2.7 78 55	2.8 66 43	3.6 52 35	2.8 40 24
- █ Average max. and min. temperatures in °F
- █ Precipitation totals in inches
- Source: The Weather Channel
Metric conversion
J	F	M	A	M	J	J	A	S	O	N	D
60 2 −8	60 4 −6	87 11 −1	100 17 5	114 23 11	100 28 16	102 30 18	89 29 17	70 26 13	72 19 6	90 11 2	71 4 −4
- █ Average max. and min. temperatures in °C
- █ Precipitation totals in mm

In recent years, average temperatures in Shelbyville have ranged from a low of 18 °F (−8 °C) in January to a high of 86 °F (30 °C) in July, although a record low of −25 °F (−32 °C) was recorded in January 1994 and a record high of 105 °F (41 °C) was recorded in July 1954. Average monthly precipitation ranged from 2.38 inches (60 mm) in January to 4.47 inches (114 mm) in May.

== Government ==
The county government is a constitutional body, and is granted specific powers by the Constitution of Indiana, and by the Indiana Code.

County Council: The legislative branch of the county government; controls spending and revenue collection in the county. Representatives are elected to four-year terms from county districts. They set salaries, the annual budget, and special spending. The council has limited authority to impose local taxes, in the form of an income and property tax that is subject to state level approval, excise taxes, and service taxes.

Board of Commissioners: The executive body of the county; commissioners are elected county-wide to staggered four-year terms. One commissioner serves as president. The commissioners execute the acts legislated by the council, collect revenue, and manage the county government.

Court: Three State Trial Courts sit in the Courthouse located at 407 S. Harrison Street, Shelbyville, Indiana 46176. Shelby Circuit Court was established by the Indiana Constitution. Shelby Superior Courts 1 and 2 were created by Acts of the Legislature. Shelby Superior Court 2 handles the small claims. Cases are allocated between the Courts by Local Court Rules. The judges of the Shelby Circuit and Superior Courts are elected to six-year terms and must be admitted to practice law in the State of Indiana. Appeals from Shelby County Trial Courts are made to the Indiana Court of Appeals.

County Officials: The county has other elected offices, including sheriff, coroner, auditor, treasurer, recorder, surveyor, and circuit court clerk. These officials are elected to four-year terms. Members elected to county government positions are required to declare party affiliations and to be residents of the county.

=== Political culture ===
United States presidential election results for Shelby County, Indiana
Year	Republican		Democratic		Third party(ies)	
Year	No.	%	No.	%	No.	%
1888	2,877	44.41%	3,409	52.62%	192	2.96%
1892	2,664	40.65%	3,490	53.26%	399	6.09%
1896	3,219	44.62%	3,828	53.06%	167	2.31%
1900	3,291	44.76%	3,846	52.31%	216	2.94%
1904	3,660	48.21%	3,550	46.76%	382	5.03%
1908	3,529	44.54%	4,035	50.93%	359	4.53%
1912	1,254	17.34%	3,432	47.47%	2,544	35.19%
1916	3,201	42.90%	3,900	52.27%	360	4.83%
1920	6,336	47.15%	6,845	50.94%	256	1.91%
1924	6,664	51.52%	5,976	46.20%	296	2.29%
1928	7,516	56.14%	5,790	43.24%	83	0.62%
1932	5,410	38.05%	8,552	60.14%	257	1.81%
1936	6,026	40.95%	8,552	58.11%	139	0.94%
1940	7,216	47.02%	8,015	52.22%	117	0.76%
1944	6,816	49.63%	6,798	49.50%	119	0.87%
1948	6,068	45.54%	6,992	52.48%	264	1.98%
1952	8,961	57.18%	6,552	41.81%	158	1.01%
1956	9,170	58.00%	6,561	41.50%	80	0.51%
1960	9,421	56.75%	7,111	42.83%	70	0.42%
1964	7,310	44.42%	9,078	55.17%	67	0.41%
1968	8,574	52.84%	5,417	33.38%	2,235	13.77%
1972	10,794	72.44%	4,028	27.03%	78	0.52%
1976	8,918	55.22%	7,098	43.95%	134	0.83%
1980	10,496	61.20%	5,861	34.17%	793	4.62%
1984	11,056	66.92%	5,357	32.42%	109	0.66%
1988	10,176	65.14%	5,382	34.45%	63	0.40%
1992	8,075	49.81%	4,560	28.13%	3,576	22.06%
1996	7,778	51.37%	5,374	35.49%	1,990	13.14%
2000	9,590	62.64%	5,374	35.10%	346	2.26%
2004	11,397	71.11%	4,519	28.20%	111	0.69%
2008	10,333	58.70%	6,987	39.69%	282	1.60%
2012	10,978	65.50%	5,359	31.97%	423	2.52%
2016	12,718	70.34%	4,247	23.49%	1,115	6.17%
2020	14,568	72.78%	5,023	25.09%	426	2.13%
2024	14,438	73.09%	4,955	25.08%	361	1.83%

== Demographics ==
Historical population
Census	Pop.	Note	%±
1830	6,295		—
1840	12,005		90.7%
1850	15,502		29.1%
1860	19,569		26.2%
1870	21,892		11.9%
1880	25,257		15.4%
1890	25,454		0.8%
1900	26,491		4.1%
1910	26,802		1.2%
1920	25,982		−3.1%
1930	26,552		2.2%
1940	25,953		−2.3%
1950	28,026		8.0%
1960	34,093		21.6%
1970	37,797		10.9%
1980	39,887		5.5%
1990	40,307		1.1%
2000	43,445		7.8%
2010	44,436		2.3%
2020	45,055		1.4%
2025 (est.)	45,882	▲	1.8%
US Decennial Census; 1790-1960 1900-1990; 1990-2000 2010

=== Racial and ethnic composition ===
Shelby County, Indiana – Racial and ethnic composition Note: the US Census treats Hispanic/Latino as an ethnic category. This table excludes Latinos from the racial categories and assigns them to a separate category. Hispanics/Latinos may be of any race.
Race / Ethnicity (NH = Non-Hispanic)	Pop 1980	Pop 1990	Pop 2000	Pop 2010	Pop 2020	% 1980	% 1990	% 2000	% 2010	% 2020
White alone (NH)	39,285	39,655	42,006	41,622	40,305	98.49%	98.38%	96.69%	93.67%	89.46%
Black or African American alone (NH)	301	329	325	428	537	0.75%	0.82%	0.75%	0.96%	1.19%
Native American or Alaska Native alone (NH)	50	62	84	85	60	0.13%	0.15%	0.19%	0.19%	0.13%
Asian alone (NH)	74	142	252	242	339	0.19%	0.35%	0.58%	0.54%	0.75%
Native Hawaiian or Pacific Islander alone (NH)	x	x	6	7	3	x	x	0.01%	0.02%	0.01%
Other race alone (NH)	28	1	21	20	127	0.07%	0.00%	0.05%	0.05%	0.28%
Mixed race or Multiracial (NH)	x	x	254	385	1,307	x	x	0.58%	0.87%	2.90%
Hispanic or Latino (any race)	149	118	497	1,647	2,377	0.37%	0.29%	1.14%	3.71%	5.28%
Total	39,887	40,307	43,445	44,436	45,055	100.00%	100.00%	100.00%	100.00%	100.00%

=== 2020 census ===
As of the 2020 census, the county had a population of 45,055. The median age was 41.5 years. 22.6% of residents were under the age of 18 and 17.9% of residents were 65 years of age or older. For every 100 females there were 99.2 males, and for every 100 females age 18 and over there were 96.8 males age 18 and over.

The racial makeup of the county was 90.7% White, 1.3% Black or African American, 0.3% American Indian and Alaska Native, 0.8% Asian, <0.1% Native Hawaiian and Pacific Islander, 2.8% from some other race, and 4.1% from two or more races. Hispanic or Latino residents of any race comprised 5.3% of the population.

47.4% of residents lived in urban areas, while 52.6% lived in rural areas.

There were 17,943 households in the county, of which 30.3% had children under the age of 18 living in them. Of all households, 50.7% were married-couple households, 17.9% were households with a male householder and no spouse or partner present, and 23.0% were households with a female householder and no spouse or partner present. About 26.3% of all households were made up of individuals and 11.7% had someone living alone who was 65 years of age or older.

There were 19,423 housing units, of which 7.6% were vacant. Among occupied housing units, 71.0% were owner-occupied and 29.0% were renter-occupied. The homeowner vacancy rate was 1.4% and the rental vacancy rate was 8.2%.

=== 2010 Census ===
As of the 2010 United States census, there were 44,436 people, 17,302 households, and 12,221 families in the county. The population density was 108.1 inhabitants per square mile (41.7/km^{2}). There were 19,080 housing units at an average density of 46.4 per square mile (17.9/km^{2}). The racial makeup of the county was 95.4% white, 1.0% black or African American, 0.5% Asian, 0.2% American Indian, 1.6% from other races, and 1.2% from two or more races. Those of Hispanic or Latino origin made up 3.7% of the population. In terms of ancestry, 28.5% were German, 13.1% were American, 12.2% were Irish, and 9.0% were English.

Of the 17,302 households, 33.8% had children under the age of 18 living with them, 54.4% were married couples living together, 10.5% had a female householder with no husband present, 29.4% were non-families, and 24.5% of all households were made up of individuals. The average household size was 2.53 and the average family size was 2.98. The median age was 39.9 years.

The median income for a household in the county was $47,697 and the median income for a family was $60,824. Males had a median income of $46,325 versus $32,416 for females. The per capita income for the county was $26,398. About 7.4% of families and 10.0% of the population were below the poverty line, including 13.7% of those under age 18 and 10.5% of those age 65 or over.

== Education ==
School districts include:

- Decatur County Community Schools
- Northwestern Consolidated School Corporation
- Shelby Eastern Schools
- Shelbyville Central Schools
- Southwestern Shelby County Consolidated Schools

== Notable people ==
- Isaac Colton Ash, Los Angeles, California, City Council member, 1925–27
- George W. Clarke, governor of Iowa, 1913–1917
- Edith Jones Woodward, astronomer, born in Waldron in 1914
- Kid Quill, hip hop/rap

== See also ==
- National Register of Historic Places listings in Shelby County, Indiana
