= TU Ursae Majoris =

Variable star

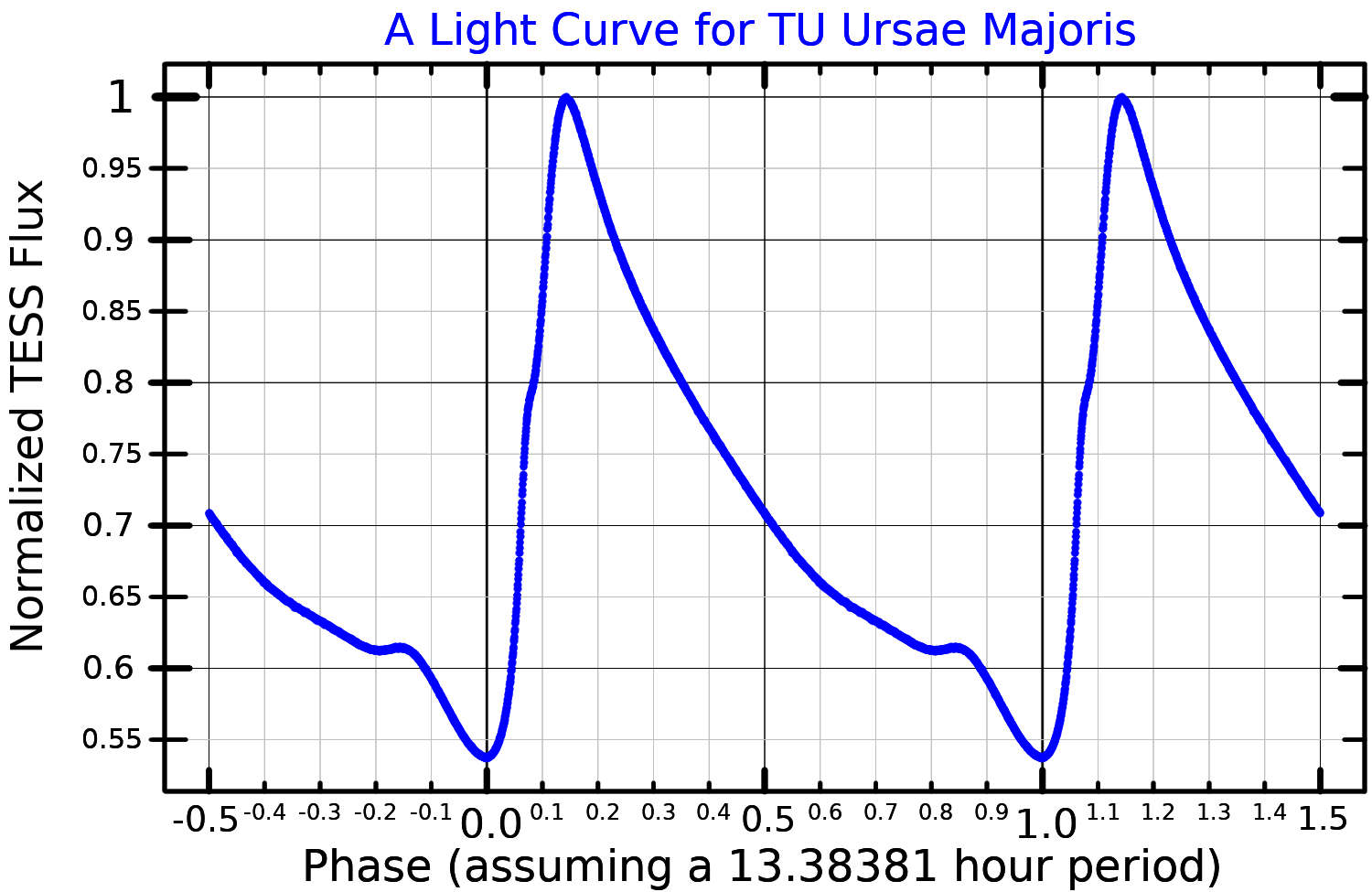
- A light curve for TU Ursae Majoris, plotted from TESS data

Observation data Epoch J2000.0 Equinox J2000.0
- Constellation: Ursa Major
- Right ascension: 11^{h} 29^{m} 48.489^{s}
- Declination: +30° 04′ 02.38″
- Apparent magnitude (V): 10.03 (9.26 to 10.24)

Characteristics
- Evolutionary stage: horizontal branch
- Spectral type: kA2hA9.5 (phase 0.03) kF0hF7.5 (phase 0.56)
- B−V color index: 0.355±0.034
- Variable type: RRab

Astrometry
Radial velocity (R_{v})	98.50±2.1 km/s
Proper motion (μ)	RA: −69.141 mas/yr Dec.: −53.426 mas/yr
Parallax (π)	1.5641±0.0252 mas
Distance	2,090 ± 30 ly (640 ± 10 pc)
Absolute magnitude (M_{V})	0.66

Details
Mass	0.55 M_{☉}
Radius	4.93 R_{☉}
Luminosity	44.7 L_{☉}
Surface gravity (log g)	2.10±0.15 cgs
Temperature	6,200±65 K
Metallicity [Fe/H]	−1.31 dex
Rotational velocity (v sin i)	12.76 km/s

Other designations
- TU Uma, BD+30 2162, HIP 56088, SAO 62578, PPM 75904

Database references
SIMBAD	data

TU Ursae Majoris is a variable star in the northern circumpolar constellation of Ursa Major. It is classified as a Bailey-type 'ab' RR Lyrae variable with a period of 0.557648 days that ranges in brightness from apparent visual magnitude of 9.26 down to 10.24. The distance to this star is approximately 2,090 light years based on parallax measurements. It is located near the north galactic pole at a distance that indicates this is a member of the galactic halo.

The periodic variability of this star was discovered by P. Guthnick and R. Prager in 1929. Its relative brightness has made this star the subject of regular observation since its discovery, both photographically and then photoelectrically starting in 1957. It was initially classed as a Bailey-type "a" RR Lyrae variable. The variations were found to be somewhat similar to RR Lyrae, with the periodicity of TU UMa differing by less than 1% of a day. However, no evidence of a long-period modulation, known as the Blazhko effect, was found in this star.

In 1990, A. Saha and R. E. White found variations in radial velocity over time that suggested this is a binary system. However, confirmation of this proved difficult because of the distance and the pulsational behavior of the variable. The system shows significant evidence of proper motion acceleration from a binary interaction. Analysis of long-term oscillatory variations suggests an orbital period of 23.3 years and an eccentricity of 0.79, with the secondary having at least 33% of the mass of the Sun.
