= St. Paul, Indiana =

- Town
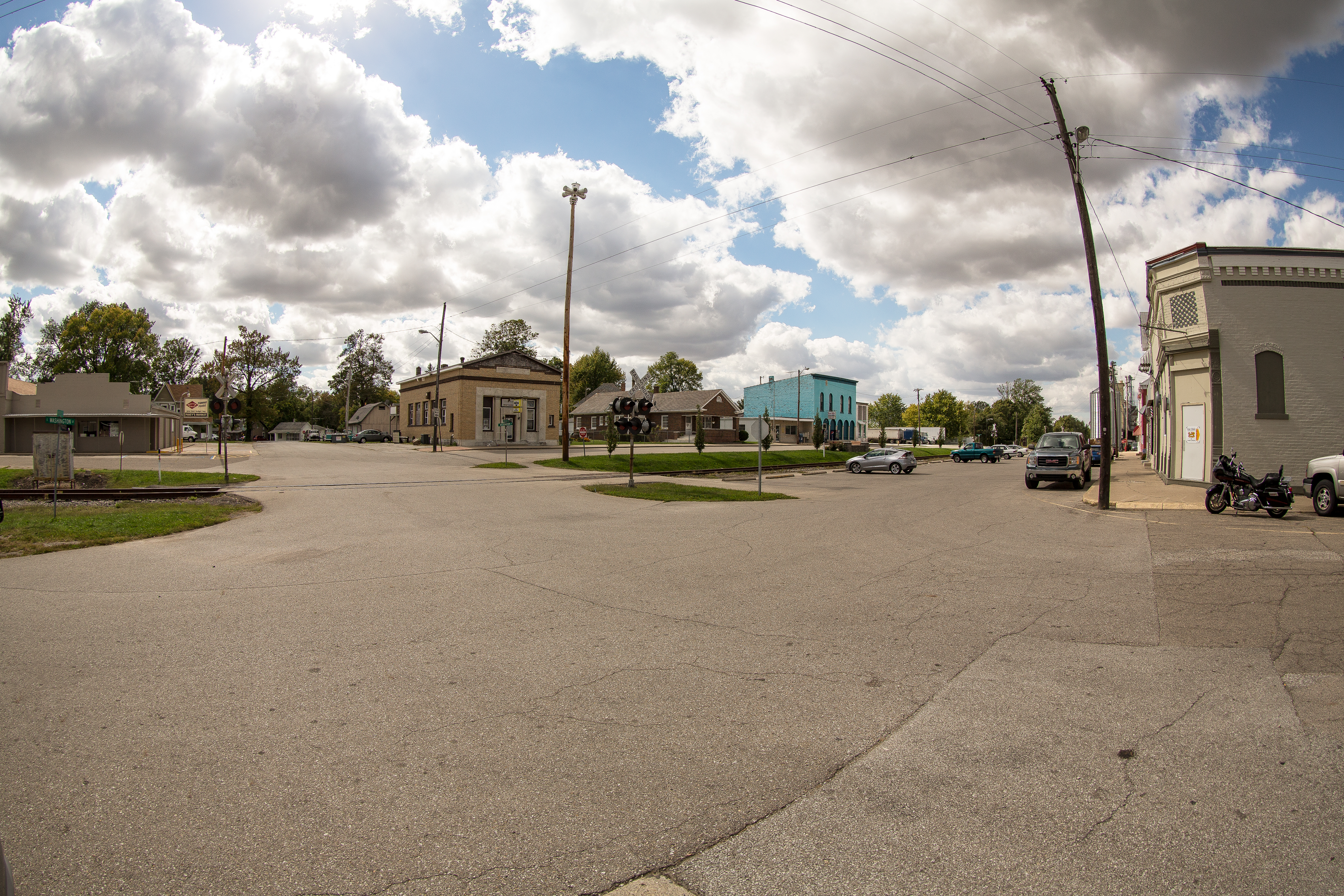

- Logo

- Location of St. Paul in Decatur County and Shelby County, Indiana.
- Coordinates: 39°25′38″N 85°37′35″W
- Country: United States
- State: Indiana
- Counties: Decatur, Shelby
- Township: Adams, Noble

Area
  - Total: 0.29 sq mi (0.76 km^{2})
  - Land: 0.29 sq mi (0.76 km^{2})
  - Water: 0 sq mi (0.00 km^{2})
- Elevation: 856 ft (261 m)

Population (2020)
  - Total: 960
  - Density: 3,281.3/sq mi (1,266.91/km^{2})
- Time zone: UTC-5 (Eastern (EST))
  - Summer (DST): UTC-4 (EDT)
- ZIP code: 47272
- FIPS code: 18-67212
- GNIS feature ID: 2396900
- Website: www.stpaulin.org

St. Paul or Saint Paul is a small town on the border of Decatur and Shelby counties in the U.S. state of Indiana. As of the 2020 census, St. Paul had a population of 960.

== History ==
St. Paul had its start in the year 1853 by the building of the railroad through that territory. It was named for Jonathan Paul, a pioneer settler.

An old variant name of the community was called Paultown.

== Geography ==
According to the 2010 census, St. Paul has a total area of 0.31 square miles (0.80 km^{2}), all land.

== Demographics ==
Historical population
Census	Pop.	Note	%±
1880	555		—
1930	678		—
1940	695		2.5%
1950	669		−3.7%
1960	702		4.9%
1970	785		11.8%
1980	976		24.3%
1990	1,032		5.7%
2000	1,022		−1.0%
2010	1,031		0.9%
2020	960		−6.9%
U.S. Decennial Census

=== 2010 census ===
As of the census of 2010, there were 1,031 people, 384 households, and 278 families living in the town. The population density was 3,325.8 inhabitants per square mile (1,284.1/km^{2}). There were 443 housing units at an average density of 1,429.0 per square mile (551.7/km^{2}). The racial makeup of the town was 98.3% White, 0.3% African American, 0.1% Native American, 0.1% Pacific Islander, 0.3% from other races, and 1.0% from two or more races. Hispanic or Latino of any race were 1.5% of the population.

There were 384 households, of which 37.2% had children under the age of 18 living with them, 50.8% were married couples living together, 14.3% had a female householder with no husband present, 7.3% had a male householder with no wife present, and 27.6% were non-families. 21.6% of all households were made up of individuals, and 9.7% had someone living alone who was 65 years of age or older. The average household size was 2.68 and the average family size was 3.10.

The median age in the town was 35.7 years. 27% of residents were under the age of 18; 9.2% were between the ages of 18 and 24; 27% were from 25 to 44; 25.3% were from 45 to 64; and 11.6% were 65 years of age or older. The gender makeup of the town was 49.3% male and 50.7% female.

=== 2000 census ===
As of the census of 2000, there were 1,022 people, 372 households, and 286 families living in the town. The population density was 3,314.7 inhabitants per square mile (1,279.8/km^{2}). There were 394 housing units at an average density of 1,277.9 per square mile (493.4/km^{2}). The racial makeup of the town was 97.95% White, 0.10% African American, 0.29% Native American, 0.20% Asian, 0.10% Pacific Islander, and 1.37% from two or more races. Hispanic or Latino of any race were 0.78% of the population.

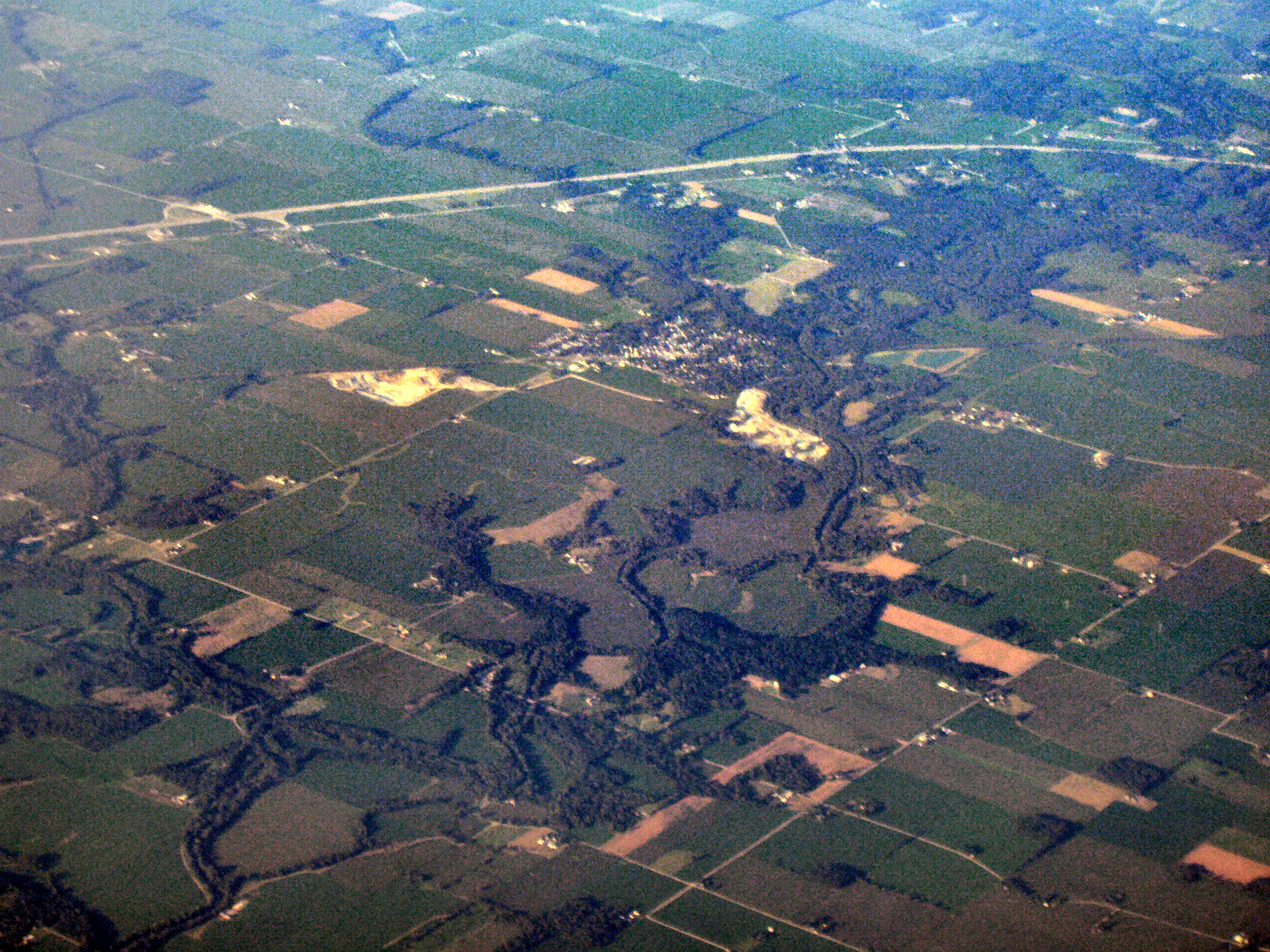
St. Paul from the air, looking northeast.

There were 372 households, out of which 44.4% had children under the age of 18 living with them, 58.6% were married couples living together, 12.1% had a female householder with no husband present, and 23.1% were non-families. 18.0% of all households were made up of individuals, and 4.8% had someone living alone who was 65 years of age or older. The average household size was 2.75 and the average family size was 3.09.

In the town, the population was spread out, with 32.0% under the age of 18, 8.5% from 18 to 24, 31.9% from 25 to 44, 19.4% from 45 to 64, and 8.2% who were 65 years of age or older. The median age was 32 years. For every 100 females, there were 94.7 males. For every 100 females age 18 and over, there were 98.6 males.

The median income for a household in the town was $39,079, and the median income for a family was $42,650. Males had a median income of $31,806 versus $20,670 for females. The per capita income for the town was $14,819. About 5.3% of families and 9.1% of the population were below the poverty line, including 10.9% of those under age 18 and 8.1% of those age 65 or over.

== Education ==
Almost all of the town is in Decatur County Community Schools. Small portions are in Shelby Eastern Schools.
