= Fairland, Indiana =

- Town
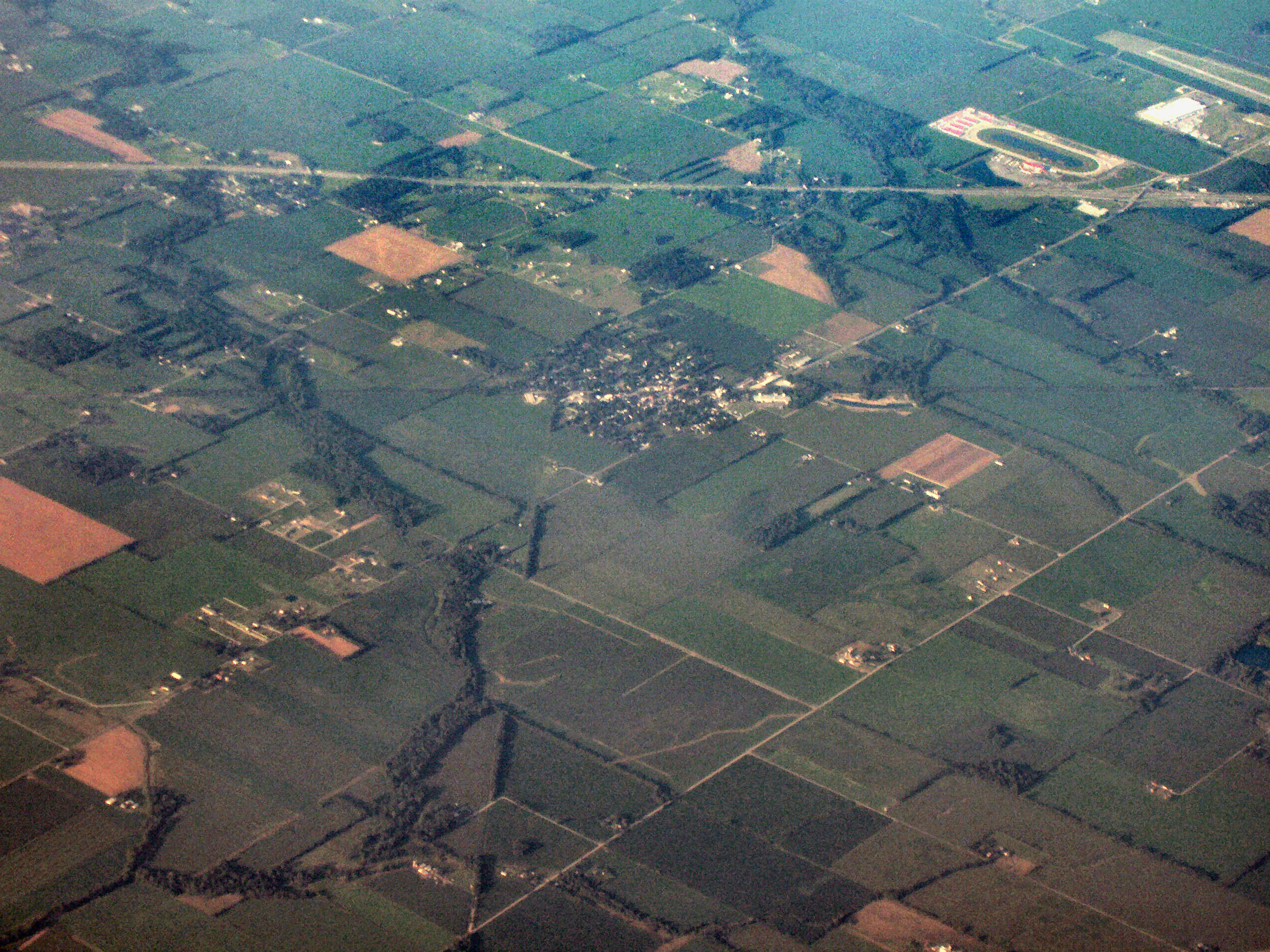
- Fairland from the air, looking northeast

- Logo

- Location of Fairland in Shelby County, Indiana.
- Coordinates: 39°35′10″N 85°51′43″W
- Country: United States
- State: Indiana
- County: Shelby
- Township: Brandywine

Area
  - Total: 1.16 sq mi (3.00 km^{2})
  - Land: 1.14 sq mi (2.96 km^{2})
  - Water: 0.015 sq mi (0.04 km^{2})
- Elevation: 771 ft (235 m)

Population (2020)
  - Total: 542
  - Density: 474.6/sq mi (183.24/km^{2})
- Time zone: UTC-5 (Eastern (EST))
  - Summer (DST): UTC-4 (EDT)
- ZIP code: 46126
- Area code: 317
- FIPS code: 18-22396
- GNIS feature ID: 2508767
- Website: fairlandin.org

Fairland is a town in Brandywine Township, Shelby County, Indiana. As of the 2020 census, Fairland had a population of 542.

== History ==
Construction of the Indianapolis, Cincinnati, and Lafayette Railroad began in 1849, and Fairland was platted in 1852. Isaac Odell and Henry Jenkins hired the J. M. Elliott Company of Shelby County to draw the plans, and this was recorded on October 21, 1852. The town was named for the "beautiful land" near the original town site. A post office has been in operation at Fairland since 1854 with Isaac Odell as the first postmaster. Several additions were made to the town: Daniel Bradley Addition (1857), Odell's First Addition (1865), Granville S. Harrel Addition (1866), Odell's Second Addition (1868), Richardson & McQuiston Addition (1872), J. B. Plymate First Addition (1891), Joseph & Luvina Plymate Addition (1902), Walker's Addition (1903), Drake's Addition (1907), and Henderson's Addition (1914). In 1866, the railroad between Martinsville and Franklin was extended from Franklin to Fairland with General Ambrose E. Burnside leading the project. The Fairland Cemetery Association was formed in 1887.

The town boasted the 22-room Park Hotel, bank, blacksmith, physicians, restaurants, general store, hardware store, butcher, Masonic hall, lumber company, sawmill, and livery stable. And, the "Fairland Bulletin" newspaper was published until it was moved to Shelbyville and became the "Volunteer".

On September 9, 1969, Allegheny Airlines Flight 853 collided in mid-air with a smaller private aircraft northwest of Fairland, killing all 83 passengers and crew of both aircraft.

== Geography ==
According to the 2010 census, Fairland has a total area of 0.16 square miles (0.41 km^{2}), all land.

== Government ==
The community, located about five miles (8 km) northwest of Shelbyville, was incorporated as a town on June 9, 1866. Later on, for an undetermined reason, the town board stopped meeting. The town government came to a halt sometime after July 1883.

On August 16, 2008, for the first time in 125 years, a three-member Fairland Town Council and a town clerk-treasurer conducted official business. Shelby County Councilwoman Tami Grubbs administered the oath of office to board members Rick Daily, John Hanson and Jeremy Creech, along with Clerk-Treasurer Chris Brinson, who immediately set about the task of organization, which included electing board officials. The board elected Daily as board president, Hanson as vice president and Creech as secretary. Indiana law mandates that all municipalities with populations under 2,000 are towns.

== Demographics ==
Historical population
Census	Pop.	Note	%±
1880	367		—
1890	513		39.8%
2010	315		—
2020	542		72.1%
U.S. Decennial Census

=== 2010 census ===
As of the census of 2010, there were 315 people, 121 households, and 90 families living in the town. The population density was 1,968.8 inhabitants per square mile (760.2/km^{2}). There were 132 housing units at an average density of 825.0 per square mile (318.5/km^{2}). The racial makeup of the town was 98.1% White, 1.6% from other races, and 0.3% from two or more races. Hispanic or Latino of any race were 3.5% of the population.

There were 121 households, of which 37.2% had children under the age of 18 living with them, 50.4% were married couples living together, 14.0% had a female householder with no husband present, 9.9% had a male householder with no wife present, and 25.6% were non-families. 23.1% of all households were made up of individuals, and 14% had someone living alone who was 65 years of age or older. The average household size was 2.60 and the average family size was 3.03.

The median age in the town was 37.5 years. 27.9% of residents were under the age of 18; 7.4% were between the ages of 18 and 24; 22.5% were from 25 to 44; 29.2% were from 45 to 64; and 13% were 65 years of age or older. The gender makeup of the town was 48.3% male and 51.7% female.

=== 2000 census ===
As of the census of 2000, there were 1,276 people, 462 households, and 369 families living in the CDP. The population density was 367.7 inhabitants per square mile (142.0/km^{2}). There were 481 housing units at an average density of 138.6 per square mile (53.5/km^{2}). The racial makeup of the CDP was 97.88% White, 0.78% Native American, 0.31% Asian, 0.31% from other races, and 0.71% from two or more races. Hispanic or Latino of any race were 0.78% of the population.

There were 462 households, out of which 37.2% had children under the age of 18 living with them, 63.6% were married couples living together, 10.6% had a female householder with no husband present, and 20.1% were non-families. 16.5% of all households were made up of individuals, and 8.7% had someone living alone who was 65 years of age or older. The average household size was 2.76 and the average family size was 3.07.

In the CDP the population was spread out, with 27.7% under the age of 18, 9.5% from 18 to 24, 29.7% from 25 to 44, 23.2% from 45 to 64, and 10.0% who were 65 years of age or older. The median age was 35 years. For every 100 females, there were 94.5 males. For every 100 females age 18 and over, there were 96.8 males.

The median income for a household in the CDP was $45,972, and the median income for a family was $50,036. Males had a median income of $27,941 versus $26,458 for females. The per capita income for the CDP was $17,406. About 5.4% of families and 10.3% of the population were below the poverty line, including 1.4% of those under age 18 and 14.7% of those age 65 or over.

== Education ==
Fairland had its own high school at the turn of the 20th century. Fairland became an incorporated town, and by 1873, a new brick school was built to replace the two separate buildings formerly used. A new school was built in 1883, and when that one burned, another was built in 1928 and used until 1984. The Fairland athletic teams were the "Hornets" until they became part of the Northwestern Consolidated School District of Shelby County and became the "Triton Tigers."

Triton Elementary School, Triton Middle School, and Triton Central High School, which make up the Triton Central Schools (formerly Northwestern Consolidated School District of Shelby County), are located approximately two miles north of the town of Fairland. The school colors are kelly green and white, and the mascot is the tiger.

== Arts and culture ==
Fairland hosts events including the Fairland Volunteer Fire Department's annual Fairland Fish Fry.

The Fairland Historical Society shares the history of Fairland, including Moral and Brandywine Townships.

== Notable people ==
- Marjorie Main - Character actress and singer
- Matt Mason - Country music singer
- Ashe Russell - Professional baseball player
