= Brandywine Creek (Big Blue River tributary) =

Stream in Indiana, U.S.

Coordinates: 39°30′58″N 85°51′34″W

Brandywine Creek is a stream in Shelby, Hancock and Franklin counties, Indiana, in the United States. It is a tributary of Big Blue River.

Brandywine Creek was so named from the fact pioneers shared a bottle of peach brandy while camped there.

== See also ==
- List of rivers of Indiana
