= Waldron, Indiana =

- Census-designated place
- Location of Waldron in Shelby County, Indiana.
- Coordinates: 39°27′13″N 85°39′47″W
- Country: United States
- State: Indiana
- County: Shelby
- Township: Liberty

Area
  - Total: 1.26 sq mi (3.26 km^{2})
  - Land: 1.26 sq mi (3.26 km^{2})
  - Water: 0 sq mi (0.00 km^{2})
- Elevation: 833 ft (254 m)

Population (2020)
  - Total: 805
  - Density: 640.5/sq mi (247.29/km^{2})
- Time zone: UTC-5 (Eastern (EST))
  - Summer (DST): UTC-4 (EDT)
- ZIP code: 46182
- FIPS code: 18-79568
- GNIS feature ID: 2629854

Waldron is an unincorporated community and census-designated place in Liberty Township, Shelby County, in the U.S. state of Indiana. As of the 2020 census, Waldron had a population of 805.

== History ==
Waldron was originally called Stroupville, and under that name was laid out in 1854 by George Stroup, and named for him. The residents were later unsatisfied with the original name, and petitioned to have it changed to Waldron. The first post office in the community was called Conns Creek. The post office was established in 1839 and was renamed Waldron in 1876, where it is still operating.

== Geography ==
=== Climate ===
The climate in this area is characterized by hot, humid summers and generally mild to cool winters. According to the Köppen Climate Classification system, Waldron has a humid subtropical climate, abbreviated "Cfa" on climate maps.

== Demographics ==
Historical population
Census	Pop.	Note	%±
2020	805		—
U.S. Decennial Census

== Schools ==
Waldron Junior Senior High School and Waldron Elementary School are both located in the town of Waldron. They are a part of the Shelby Eastern School District. The first school was opened in 1873 and Waldron High School graduated its first class in 1899.
