= National Register of Historic Places listings in Shelby County, Indiana =

Location of Shelby County in Indiana

This is a list of the National Register of Historic Places listings in Shelby County, Indiana.

This is intended to be a complete list of the properties and districts on the National Register of Historic Places in Shelby County, Indiana, United States. Latitude and longitude coordinates are provided for many National Register properties and districts; these locations may be seen together in a map.

There are 15 properties and districts listed on the National Register in the county.

Properties and districts located in incorporated areas display the name of the municipality, while properties and districts in unincorporated areas display the name of their civil township. Properties and districts split between multiple jurisdictions display the names of all jurisdictions.

This National Park Service list is complete through NPS recent listings posted December 19, 2025.

== Current listings ==
	Name on the Register	Image	Date listed	Location	City or town	Description
1	Clover Ford Iron Bridge		May 22, 2023 (#100009015)	Blue River Memorial Park, 725 Lee Blvd. 39°31′54″N 85°44′46″W	Shelbyville	
2	Cooper-Alley House	Cooper-Alley House	July 7, 1982 (#82000074)	South of Waldron; 39°25′15″N 85°40′23″W	Noble Township	
3	John Hamilton House	John Hamilton House	June 4, 1979 (#79000043)	132 W. Washington St. 39°31′28″N 85°46′48″W	Shelbyville	
4	Junction Railroad Depot	Junction Railroad Depot	November 14, 1979 (#79000044)	U.S. Route 52; 39°40′29″N 85°42′17″W	Morristown	
5	Liberty Township Schoolhouse No. 2	Liberty Township Schoolhouse No. 2	September 4, 1992 (#92001170)	Junction of State Road 244 and County Road 600E, north of Waldron; 39°29′51″N 85°40′03″W	Liberty Township	
6	Messick Masonic Temple		March 4, 2024 (#100010029)	519 South Harrison Street; 39°31′13″N 85°46′38″W	Shelbyville	
7	Middletown Bridge	Middletown Bridge	December 24, 2009 (#09001135)	County Road 450S over Conn's Creek, northwest of Middletown; 39°27′44″N 85°39′06″W	Liberty Township	
8	Lora B. Pearson School	Lora B. Pearson School	December 24, 2009 (#09001136)	115 W. Colescott St. 39°31′04″N 85°46′43″W	Shelbyville	
9	Porter Pool Bathhouse	Porter Pool Bathhouse	December 7, 2001 (#01001348)	501 N. Harrison St. 39°31′41″N 85°46′40″W	Shelbyville	
10	George Rudicel Polygonal Barn	George Rudicel Polygonal Barn	May 27, 1993 (#93000463)	Junction of County Roads 700S and 400E, southwest of Waldron; 39°25′27″N 85°42′12″W	Noble Township	
11	St. George Lutheran Church	St. George Lutheran Church	May 24, 1984 (#84001627)	State Road 252, east of Edinburgh; 39°21′51″N 85°53′41″W	Jackson Township	
12	Shelbyville Commercial Historic District	Shelbyville Commercial Historic District	August 9, 1984 (#84001638)	Roughly bounded by Broadway, Tompkins, Mechanic, and Noble Sts. 39°31′27″N 85°46′33″W	Shelbyville	
13	Shelby County Courthouse	Shelby County Courthouse	December 15, 2011 (#11000917)	407 S. Harrison St. 39°31′16″N 85°46′40″W	Shelbyville	
14	Shelbyville High School	Shelbyville High School	January 11, 1996 (#95001535)	Junction of 2nd and Tompkins Sts. 39°30′54″N 85°46′47″W	Shelbyville	
15	West Side Historic District	West Side Historic District	February 9, 1990 (#90000099)	Roughly bounded by W. Pennsylvania, N. Harrison, N. and S. Thompkins, W. Hendricks, Montgomery, and N. Conrey; 39°31′31″N 85°46′54″W	Shelbyville	

== See also ==
- List of National Historic Landmarks in Indiana
- National Register of Historic Places listings in Indiana
- Listings in neighboring counties: Bartholomew, Decatur, Hancock, Johnson, Marion, Rush
- List of Indiana state historical markers in Shelby County
