= Shelbyville Historic District (disambiguation) =

Shelbyville Historic District may refer to one of several historic districts, including:

Illinois

- Shelbyville Historic District in Shelbyville, Illinois

Indiana

- Shelbyville Commercial Historic District in Shelbyville, Indiana
- West Side Historic District (Shelbyville, Indiana), included in National Register of Historic Places listings in Shelby County, Indiana

Kentucky

- East Shelbyville District in Shelbyville, Kentucky
- Shelby County Courthouse and Main Street Commercial District in Shelbyville, Kentucky
- West Shelbyville District in Shelbyville, Kentucky

Tennessee

- East Shelbyville Historic District in Shelbyville, Tennessee
- Shelbyville Courthouse Square Historic District, Shelbyville, Tennessee

== See also ==
- Shelbyville (disambiguation)
- Shelbyville High School (disambiguation)
