= Shelbyville High School =

Shelbyville High School may refer to:

- Shelbyville High School (Illinois) in Shelbyville, Illinois, U.S.
- Shelbyville High School (Indiana) in Shelbyville, Indiana, U.S.
- Shelbyville High School (Texas) in Shelbyville, Texas, U.S.
- Shelbyville High School (Tennessee), also known as Turner Normal and Industrial School, in Shelbyville, Tennessee, U.S.

== See also ==
- Shelbyville (disambiguation)
- Shelbyville Historic District (disambiguation)
