= Sandy Allen =

American female giant (1955–2008)

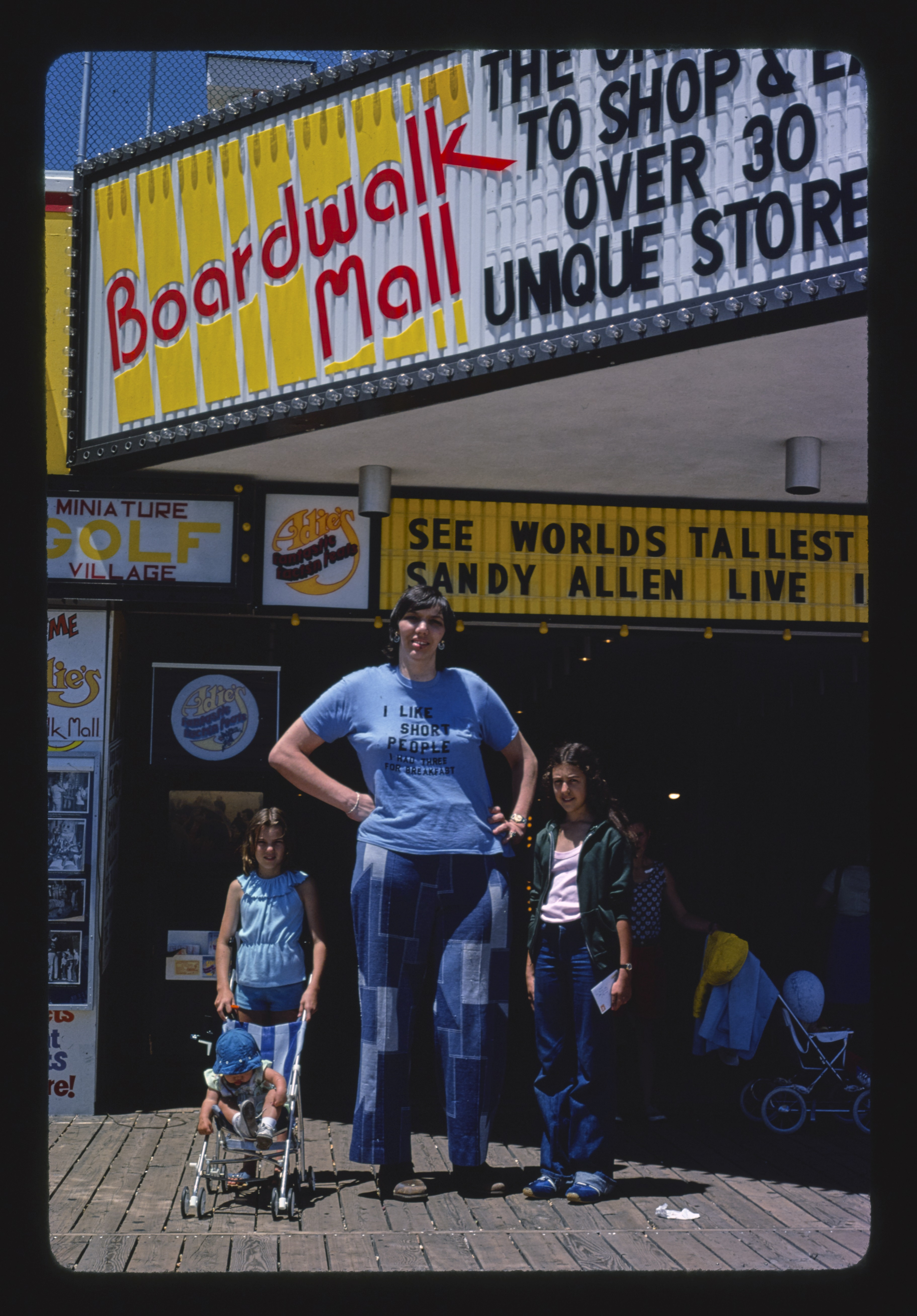
- Allen on the Wildwood New Jersey boardwalk in 1978
- Born: Sandra Elaine Allen; June 18, 1955; Chicago, Illinois, U.S.
- Died: August 13, 2008 (aged 53); Shelbyville, Indiana, U.S.
- Known for: Former tallest woman in the world
- Height: 7 ft 7 in (231 cm)

Sandra Elaine Allen (June 18, 1955 – August 13, 2008) was an American woman who was recognized by the Guinness World Records as the tallest woman in the world. She was 7 feet 7 inches (231 cm) tall.

== Early life ==
Her height was due to a tumor in her pituitary gland that caused it to release growth hormone uncontrollably, between 200 and 1,000 times more than usual.

She was born in Chicago, and grew up in Shelbyville, Indiana, and was raised by her grandmother, who worked as a cleaning woman. At the age of 22, in 1977, she underwent surgery for the condition. Lacking this procedure, Allen would have continued to grow and suffer further medical problems associated with gigantism.

== Career ==
Although over the years other women have taken the title of the tallest woman, Allen held it for the last sixteen years of her life.

She appeared in the film Fellini's Casanova and the 1981 TV movie Side Show as Goliatha. As herself, she appeared in the 1999 American documentary Sideshow: Alive on the Inside, and in the Canadian/American documentary film, Being Different. The New Zealand band Split Enz wrote a song about her, "Hello Sandy Allen", released in 1982.

Allen never married, saying that she was "an oldfashioned girl" and would not date a man shorter than her.

In 2001, she dictated her life story to John Kleiman, which he wrote and published as Cast a Giant Shadow: The Inspirational Life Story of Sandy Allen “The World’s Tallest Living Woman”.

In her later years, Allen used a wheelchair because her legs and back could no longer support her tall stature while standing. At one point, she was bedridden due to disease, causing atrophy of the muscles. Due to this limitation, she spent her last years in Shelbyville, Indiana, in the same retirement center as Edna Parker, the oldest living human at the time.

== Death ==
Allen died on August 13, 2008. Her family friend, Rita Rose, revealed that she suffered from a recurring blood infection, along with Type 2 diabetes, breathing troubles, and kidney failure.

== Legacy ==
A scholarship was dedicated in Allen's name at Shelbyville High School. In 2020, Allen's friend and manager, John Kleiman, donated a collection of her memorabilia to Ripley's Museums.

Preceded by Zeng Jinlian	Tallest recognized woman 1976–2008	Succeeded by Yao Defen
