= Shelby Township, Indiana =

Shelby Township, Indiana may refer to one of the following places:

- Shelby Township, Jefferson County, Indiana
- Shelby Township, Ripley County, Indiana
- Shelby Township, Shelby County, Indiana
- Shelby Township, Tippecanoe County, Indiana

See also

- Shelby Township (disambiguation)
