= List of Indiana state historical markers in Shelby County =

Location of Shelby County in Indiana

This is a list of the Indiana state historical markers in Shelby County.

This is intended to be a complete list of the official state historical markers placed in Shelby County, Indiana, United States by the Indiana Historical Bureau. The locations of the historical markers and their latitude and longitude coordinates are included below when available, along with their names, years of placement, and topics as recorded by the Historical Bureau. There are 5 historical markers located in Shelby County.

== Historical markers ==
Marker title	Image	Year placed	Location	Topics
Jacob Whetzel Trace		1951	State Road 9, 4.5 miles north of Shelbyville; 39°35′30″N 85°46′35″W	Transportation, Early Settlement and Exploration
De Witt Pioneer Home		1959	Eastern side of County Road 625E, 0.5 miles north of E. Union Road, 2 miles northeast of Rays Crossing and State Road 44; 39°34′36″N 85°39′53″W	Early Settlement and Exploration
Site of Home of Thomas Andrews Hendricks September 7, 1819-November 25, 1885		1966	N. Harrison and E. Mechanic Streets in Shelbyville; 39°31′33″N 85°46′36.6″W	Politics
Indiana's First Railroad		1966	State Road 44 between E. Broadway and McLane Streets, east of downtown Shelbyville; 39°31′22″N 85°45′59″W	Transportation
Whetzel Trace		2011	Indiana State Road 9, 4 miles north of Shelbyville; 39°35′36.5″N 85°46′36.6″W	American Indians; Early Settlement

== See also ==
- List of Indiana state historical markers
- National Register of Historic Places listings in Shelby County, Indiana
