= Luke Messer =

American politician (born 1969)

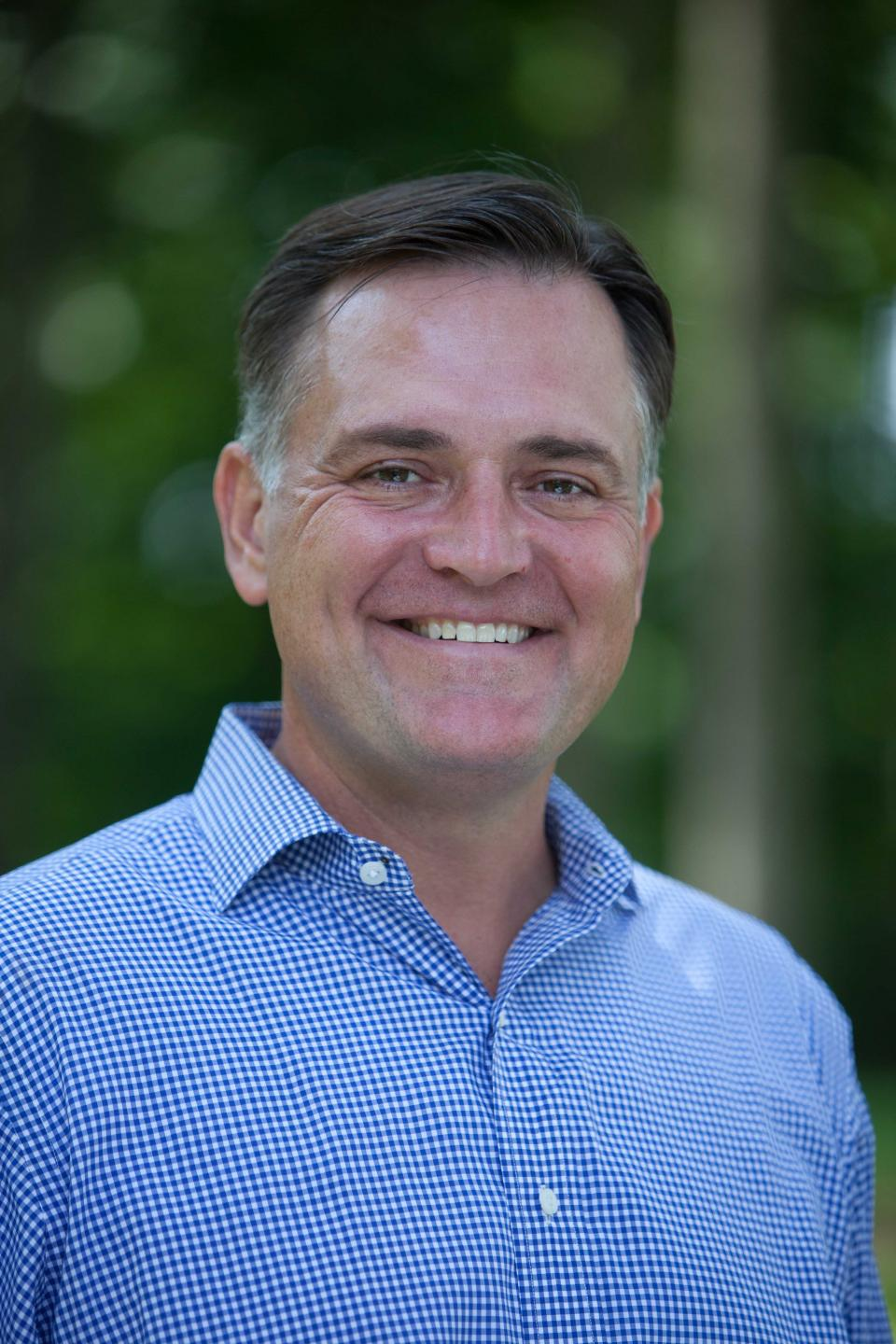

Chair of the House Republican Policy Committee
- In office January 3, 2015 – January 3, 2019
- Leader: John Boehner; Paul Ryan
- Preceded by: James Lankford
- Succeeded by: Gary Palmer

Member of the U.S. House of Representatives from Indiana's 6th district
- In office January 3, 2013 – January 3, 2019
- Preceded by: Mike Pence
- Succeeded by: Greg Pence

Member of the Indiana House of Representatives from the 57th district
- In office May 21, 2003 – November 21, 2006
- Preceded by: Roland Stine
- Succeeded by: Sean Eberhart

Personal details
- Born: Allen Lucas Messer; February 27, 1969 (age 57) Evansville, Indiana, U.S.
- Party: Republican
- Spouse: Jennifer Messer
- Education: Wabash College (BA); Vanderbilt University (JD)

Allen Lucas Messer (born February 27, 1969) is an American politician and lobbyist who represented Indiana's 6th congressional district in the United States House of Representatives from 2013 to 2019. He is a member of the Republican Party.

Born in Evansville, Indiana, Messer is a graduate of Wabash College and Vanderbilt University Law School. After an unsuccessful run for the U.S. House in 2000, Messer served as the first executive director of the Indiana Republican Party from 2001 to 2005. Messer was appointed to serve in the Indiana House of Representatives in 2003, after State Representative W. Roland Stine was killed in a car accident. He represented Indiana's 57th District from 2003 to 2006, when he opted not to run for reelection and instead joined Ice Miller LLP's lobbying division. From 2006 to 2012, Messer was a registered lobbyist. He ran for the U.S. House again in 2010, but was unsuccessful in his primary challenge to Republican Dan Burton. When Mike Pence decided in 2012 to run for Governor of Indiana, Messer was elected to replace him, defeating Democratic nominee Brad Bookout.

On July 26, 2017, Messer announced that he would run for the U.S. Senate in 2018. He was unsuccessful in the May 8 primary election, losing to Mike Braun.

== Early life and career ==
Messer graduated from Greensburg Community High School in 1987. Messer attended Wabash College where he was a member of the Phi Delta Theta fraternity and majored in speech. He graduated in 1991. He received a Juris Doctor from Vanderbilt University Law School in 1994. Shortly after graduating from Vanderbilt, he served as an Associate Counsel at Koch Industries from 1995 to 1996.

Messer started his political career in 1997 as the press secretary for Tennessee Representative Ed Bryant. He was the legal counsel on the House Subcommittee for Government Reform for Indiana Representatives David McIntosh and Dan Burton from 1998 to 1999, and the legal counsel to U.S. Representative Jim Duncan later in 1999. In 1998, he was the campaign manager for Virginia Murphy Blankenbaker's unsuccessful congressional campaign. In 1999, Messer returned to Indiana and practiced law at the Barnes & Thornburg law firm in Indianapolis.

In 2000, Messer ran for the United States House of Representatives in Indiana's 2nd congressional district, where incumbent David M. McIntosh was retiring to run for governor of Indiana in the 2000 election. Messer received the endorsement of The Indianapolis Star. He received 21 percent of the vote in the Republican Party's primary election, finishing behind conservative talk show host Mike Pence, who won with 44 percent of the vote, and Jeff Linder, who received 24 percent of the vote. In 2001, Messer was chosen as the executive director of the Indiana Republican Party.

== Indiana House of Representatives ==
On May 23, 2003, Messer was selected to succeed W. Roland Stine, who died in a traffic collision, in the Indiana House of Representatives for the 57th district. From 2003 to 2006, Messer represented District 57 in the Indiana House of Representatives, which contained parts of Shelby County and Bartholomew County. During the 2005-06 legislative session, Messer was Assistant Majority Floor Leader. His legislation aimed at curbing high school dropout rates received national attention after Shelbyville High School became a symbol of a national dropout crisis. He did not run for reelection as State Representative in 2006, and was succeeded by Sean Eberhart.

== Lobbying work ==
Messer was a registered lobbyist from 2006 to 2012.

In 2006, Messer joined Ice Miller LLP's lobbying division as a partner of their public affairs group. His decision to join Ice Miller came a month after voting in favor of Indiana leasing the Indiana Toll Road to Cintra-Macquarie, an international consortium, for "75 years at a cost of $3.85 billion." Ice Miller, Indiana's largest law firm, represented Cintra-Macquarie in the deal. Messer said he "did not know they represented anyone in connection with the Toll Road."

Messer served as the Indiana co-chair of John McCain's 2008 presidential campaign. In 2010, Messer ran for the House of Representatives in Indiana's 5th congressional district. He challenged Dan Burton, the incumbent representative, in the Republican primary. Burton narrowly defeated Messer. Messer then became president and CEO of School Choice Indiana, a lobbying group that supported Indiana's private school voucher law.

Since being elected to Congress in 2012, Ice Miller LLP has been Messer's top source of campaign contributions, having given him $82,238.

== United States House of Representatives ==
=== Elections ===
In May 2011, Mike Pence announced his intention to run for Governor of Indiana. Messer subsequently declared his candidacy for the Republican nomination in the district, which had been renumbered as the 6th District after the 2000 census. His home in Shelbyville had been drawn back into the district after the 2010 census after being drawn into the neighboring 5th after the 2000 census. On May 8, 2012, Messer defeated a crowded field of Republican candidates seeking the party's nomination, including Columbus real estate investor Travis Hankins, winning with 71% of the vote. He faced Democrat Brad Bookout, a Delaware County councilman, in the general election. On November 6, 2012, Messer defeated Bookout with roughly 59% of the vote. After the election, Messer moved to the Washington metropolitan area.

=== Committee assignments ===
- United States House Republican Policy Committee, Chair
- Committee on Education and the Workforce
  - Subcommittee on Higher Education and Workforce Training
- Committee on Financial Services

=== Caucus memberships ===
- United States Congressional International Conservation Caucus

=== Tenure ===
In November 2014, Messer was elected by his colleagues to Republican House Leadership as the House Republican Policy Committee Chairman, succeeding James Lankford, who had been elected to the United States Senate. Messer defeated Tom Reed and Rob Woodall.

In 2017, Messer founded the Congressional School Choice caucus to promote the expansion of school voucher programs.

In May 2018, Messer led a group of 18 House Republicans unofficially nominating President Trump for the Nobel Peace Prize "for his efforts to denuclearize the Korean Peninsula and end the 68-year-old war between North and South Korea".

== Political views and legislation ==
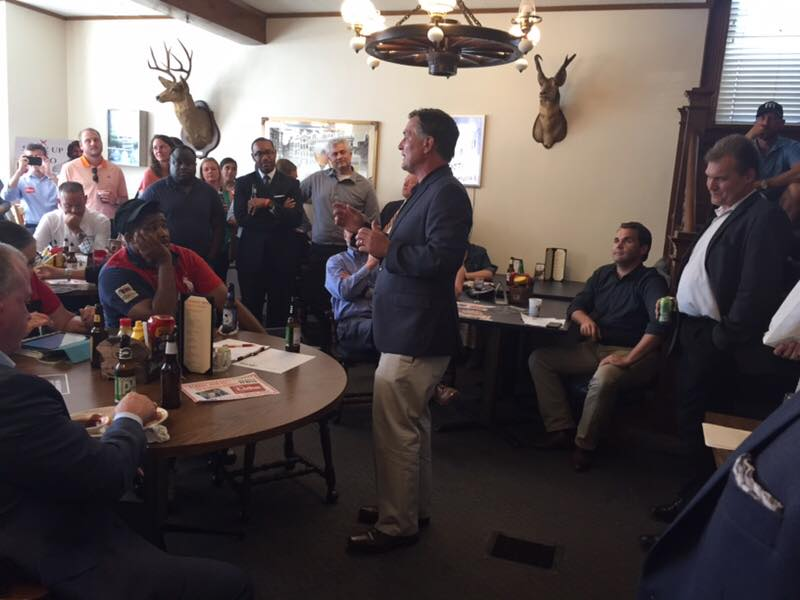
Messer speaks at the Antelope Club. August 2, 2017

Messer, like Pence, is an ardent conservative. During his initial run for Congress, Messer told NPR member WFIU, "If you like Congressman Mike Pence, we’re going to have very similar philosophy in the way we approach the job."

=== Social issues ===
Messer opposes abortion rights. He opposes the federal government funding organizations that offer abortions, unless the abortions are the result of rape or incest or the woman's life is threatened.

On January 4, 2013, Messer voted for the Title X Abortion Provider Prohibition Act, which prohibits distribution of federal family planning funds to organizations that offer abortions unless the abortion is the result of pregnancy from incest or rape or the woman's life is at risk.

Messer opposes same-sex marriage.

=== Economic issues ===
On May 9, 2013, Messer voted for the Full Faith and Credit Act, which prioritized spending if the debt limit is reached. Messer voted for the Tax Cuts and Jobs Act of 2017 and has stated his support for reforming the tax code to simplify it and reduce tax rates.

Messer supports a balanced budget amendment. He opposes federal stimulus spending and supports limiting federal spending growth to per-capita inflation rate.

=== Education ===
In August 2013, Messer worked to pass bipartisan legislation to prevent student loan interest rates from doubling in 2013 and to link student loan interest rates to market rates.

In July 2017, Messer authored legislation to "upend the way American students pay for college." His legislation lays the framework for income share agreements, which have several advantages over traditional student loans. Messer has introduced legislation to require annual debt letters to be sent to student loan borrowers, which is based on an Indiana University program that reduced borrowing at the institution by 10 percent. Messer worked with Sen. Patty Murray to restore Pell Grant eligibility to students who were attending ITT Tech when the institution closed, by convincing the Education Department to restore these benefits using an existing statute.

Messer supports the expansion of school voucher programs.

=== Health care ===
Messer is in favor of repealing the Affordable Care Act ("Obamacare") and replacing it with "something better".

In May 2017, Messer voted for the House bill American Health Care Act of 2017, to partially repeal the Patient Protection and Affordable Care Act.

=== Immigration ===
In July 2017, Messer authored legislation that would prevent undocumented immigrants from claiming the child tax credit. President Donald Trump included the same proposal in his 2018 budget request to Congress.

Messer commented on the work of a 2013 bipartisan House working group on immigration reform, saying that a pathway to citizenship and a deal on metrics to measure border security would be the biggest challenges to final passage of immigration reform. Messer told Indiana's Biz Voice Magazine, "Those who came here unlawfully will have to pay penalties and back fees."

Messer supported President Donald Trump's 2017 executive order to impose a temporary ban on entry to the U.S. to citizens of seven Muslim-majority countries, describing it as a measure to "protect Americans from terrorist threats" and saying that "President Trump is right to prioritize American safety."

=== Veterans ===
Messer supported a GI Bill reform package passed by the House on June 25, 2017 and signed into law by President Trump, which included a provision he authored that would retroactively restore education benefits to veterans attending schools that close mid-semester, like ITT Technical Institute.

=== Crime ===
In February 2013, Messer voted in favor of reauthorizing the Violence Against Women Act.

== Electoral history ==
=== 2000 ===
Indiana's 2nd Congressional District Republican primary election (2000)
Party	Candidate	Votes	%
Republican	Mike Pence	21,582	44.48
Republican	Jeffery M. Linder	11,615	23.94
Republican	Luke Messer	10,075	20.76
Republican	Brad D. Steele	2,819	5.81
Republican	David M. (Mike) Campbell	1,913	3.94
Republican	Cliff Federle	513	1.06

=== 2006 ===
Indiana House of Representatives, 57th District (2006)
Party	Candidate	Votes	%
Republican	Luke Messer	16,004	100
Total votes		16,004	100
Republican hold			

=== 2010 ===
Indiana's 5th Congressional District Republican primary election (2010)
Party	Candidate	Votes	%
Republican	Dan Burton (incumbent)	32,649	30
Republican	Luke Messer	30,386	28
Republican	John McGoff	20,645	19
Republican	Michael B. Murphy	9,761	9
Republican	Brose McVey	9,355	8
Republican	Andy Lyons	3,948	4
Republican	Ann Adcook	3,344	3

=== 2012 ===
Indiana's 6th Congressional District election, 2012
Party	Candidate	Votes	%
Republican	Luke Messer	162,613	59
Democratic	Brad Bookout	96,678	35
Libertarian	Rex Bell	15,962	6
Total votes		275,253	100
Republican hold			

=== 2014 ===
Indiana's 6th Congressional District Election (2014)
Party	Candidate	Votes	%
Republican	Luke Messer*	102,187	65.90
Democratic	Susan Hall Heitzman	45,509	29.35
Libertarian	Eric Miller	7,375	4.76
Total votes		155,071	100.00
Turnout			32
Republican hold			

=== 2016 ===
Indiana's 6th Congressional District Election (2016)
Party	Candidate	Votes	%
Republican	Luke Messer*	204,920	69.14
Democratic	Barry A. Welsh	79,135	26.70
Libertarian	Rich Turvey	12,330	4.16
Total votes		296,385	100.00
Turnout			59
Republican hold			

=== 2018 ===
Indiana's U.S. Senate Republican Primary Election (2018)
Party	Candidate	Votes	%
Republican	Mike Braun	208,104	41.2
Republican	Todd Rokita	151,675	30.0
Republican	Luke Messer	145,772	28.8
Total votes			100

== Personal life ==
Messer and his wife Jennifer have two daughters and one son. Luke and Jennifer Messer are the authors of a children's book, Hoosier Heart.

Messer was cited for driving under the influence (DUI) in 1990 and 1996.

Following Messer's election to Congress, he sold his house in Shelbyville, Indiana and moved to McLean, Virginia, a Washington, D.C. suburb. He is now listed as a registered voter at his mother's address in Greensburg, Indiana. Messer has clarified that he owns the home with his mother and lives there when he is in the state. He faced criticism from his opponents in the 2018 Republican primary election for the United States Senate for moving his family to the Washington, D.C. area.

Fishers, an Indianapolis suburb, has paid Jennifer Messer $580,000 since 2015 in legal consulting she primarily does from the family's Washington, D.C. area home. She is paid $20,000 a month as a part-time contract attorney for the city. Jennifer Messer began the work for the City of Fishers two years before her husband was elected to Congress. Fishers Mayor Scott Fadness said the arrangement helped usher in an era of "unprecedented" economic success in the growing suburb of about 85,000 people. Messer has defended his wife's work, calling her "the brains of the Messer outfit", and Jennifer defended her work in an op-ed for The Indianapolis Star, calling an Associated Press story about her "unfair, intellectually dishonest and straight-up sexist".

Messer is a Presbyterian.

U.S. House of Representatives
Preceded by Mike Pence	Member of the U.S. House of Representatives from Indiana's 6th congressional district 2013–2019	Succeeded by Greg Pence
Party political offices
Preceded by James Lankford	Chair of the House Republican Policy Committee; 2015–2019	Succeeded by Gary Palmer
U.S. order of precedence (ceremonial)
Preceded by David McIntosh as Former U.S. Representative	Order of precedence of the United States as Former U.S. Representative	Succeeded by Trey Hollingsworth as Former U.S. Representative
