= W. Roland Stine =

American politician and educator

Member of the Indiana House of Representatives from the 57th district
- In office November 6, 2002 – April 24, 2003
- Preceded by: Mike Herndon
- Succeeded by: Luke Messer

Personal details
- Born: William Roland Stine; September 7, 1940 Shelbyville, Indiana, U.S.
- Died: April 24, 2003 (aged 62) Johnson County, Indiana, U.S.
- Party: Republican
- Spouse: Carole Fricker
- Education: Indiana University

William Roland Stine (September 7, 1940 – April 24, 2003) was an American politician and educator.

Stine was born in Shelbyville, Indiana and graduated from Shelbyville High School in 1958. He received his bachelor's and master's degrees from Indiana University. He taught history at Shelbyville Middle School. He served on the Shelbyville City Council from 1987 to 2002. He then served in the Indiana House of Representatives in 2003 as a Republican.

== Death ==
Stine was killed in an automobile accident in Johnson County, Indiana, while serving his first year in the Indiana General Assembly. He was struck by former student Allan Wickliff.
