= Shelbyville =

Shelbyville may refer to:

== Places and locations ==
=== United States ===
- Shelbyville, Illinois
- Shelbyville, Indiana
- Shelbyville, Kentucky
- Shelbyville, Michigan
- Shelbyville, Missouri
- Shelbyville, Tennessee
- Shelbyville, Texas

== Arts, entertainment, and media ==
=== Fictional places ===
- Shelbyville (The Simpsons), a fictional city in the television series The Simpsons

== See also ==
- Shelbyville Historic District (disambiguation)
- Shelbyville High School (disambiguation)
- Shelby (disambiguation)
