= Kid Quill =

American rapper (born 1994)

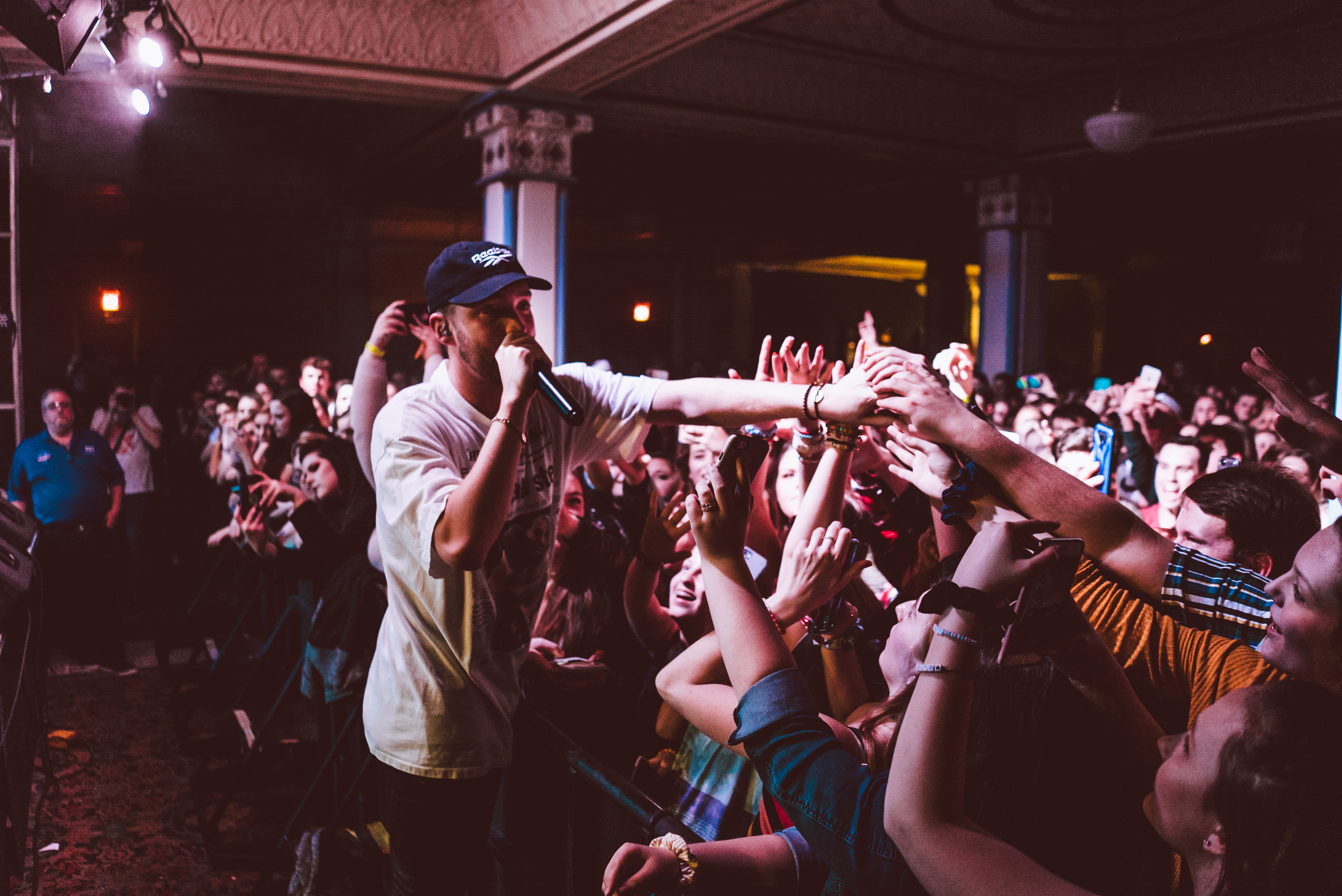
- Kid Quill performing in 2019

Background information
- Born: Mitchell Quilleon Brown; February 21, 1994 (age 32); Shelbyville, Indiana, U.S.
- Genres: Hip hop
- Occupations: Rapper, singer, producer, writer
- Years active: 2013–present
- Label: Independent
- Website: kidquill.com

Mitchell Quilleon Brown, known by his stage name Kid Quill, is an American rapper from Shelbyville, Indiana. The name Kid Quill originates from his middle name Quilleon with the addition of Kid to the beginning. He made his first notable appearance with his 2016 album The Name Above The Title.

== Soccer career ==
While attending Shelbyville Senior High School, Brown was a 3-time Hoosier Heritage All-Conference First Team, 2-time Indiana Soccer Coaches Association Top Team Player Awards, 2-time Indiana All-District First Team, 3-time Top Drawer Soccer Player to Watch, 2-time Indianapolis Star Super Team, 2011 Indiana All-State 3rd Team Selection, and 2012 NSCAA Soccer All-American Scholar.

He decided to continue his soccer career by playing for DePauw University at the collegiate level. He had three appearances in his first year, including playing in the NCAA Tournament, and two in his second year.

His junior year, Brown decided to quit soccer because the balance of music, soccer, and school was too much.

== Music career ==
While in high school, Brown would rap battle friends in his basement. One of his friends decided to record Brown rapping and uploaded it to YouTube where it received a good number of views. Noticing that there was potential, he decided to pursue rapping.

On October 14, 2016, Brown released his debut album The Name Above The Title. It charted Top 10 on iTunes Hip-Hop/Rap. It also charted as a Billboard Heatseeker.

In September 2017, Brown followed his first album with 94.3 The Reel. This also charted Top 10 on iTunes Hip-Hop/Rap Charts. He spent the following year as support on nationals tours with Devvon Terrell, SoMo, Skizzy Mars and Bryce Vine.

On September 6, 2019, Brown released his fourth album, titled Sunset Diner, inspired by his adolescence, 80s and 90s music and his life experiences.

On September 25, September 26 and September 27th 2020, Brown opened for Quinn XCII and Chelsea Cutler at their drive in shows at Charlotte Motor Speedway and The Westland Mall.

On May 26, 2023, after a long period of silence, Brown released his fifth album, Good People. He announced his "Good People" tour shortly after, visiting cities such as London, Los Angeles, and Chicago.

== Discography ==
=== Albums ===
- Ear to Ear (2014)
- The Name Above The Title (2016)
- 94.3 The Reel (2017)
- Sunset Diner (2019)
- Good People (2023)

=== Singles ===
==== As lead artist ====
- "So Good (Remix)" (2017)
- "Weatherman" (2018)
- "Kids in the Summer" (2018)
- "Rain, Rain" (2018)
- "90's Kids" (2021)
- "Curbside" (2021)
- "1br Apt" (2021)
- "Mood Ring" (2021)
- "Greener" (2021)
- "Doug and Cathy" (2023)
- "Photosynthesis" (2023)
- "Sierra Miss" (2024)
- “Good things come in twos” (2024)
- “PICO” (2025)

==== As featured artist ====
- "IOU" (EMAN8 featuring Kid Quill) (2019)
- "No Drama" (Two Friends featuring Kid Quill and New Beat Fund) (2020)
