= Shelbyville Senior High School =

Location
- 2003 South Miller Street; Shelbyville, Shelby County, Indiana 46176; United States; 39.506048°N 85.788729°W

Information
- Type: Public high school
- School district: Shelbyville Central Schools
- Principal: Amy Dawson
- Teaching staff: 62.67 (FTE)
- Grades: 9-12
- Enrollment: 1,093 (2023–2024)
- Student to teacher ratio: 17.44
- Color
- Athletics: Class 4A
- Athletics conference: Hoosier Heritage Conference
- Team name: Golden Bears
- Website: Official Site

Shelbyville Senior High School is a public high school located in Shelbyville, Indiana, United States. It is managed by Shelbyville Central Schools.

== Administration ==
- Superintendent: Mary Harper
- Principal: Amy Dawson

== Athletics ==
The school is a member of the Hoosier Heritage Conference. Their mascot is the golden bear.

The school offers the following Junior Varsity and Varsity level sports:

- Baseball
- Boys' Basketball
- Girls' Basketball
- Boys' and Girls' Bowling
- Boys' Cross Country
- Girls' Cross Country
- Football
- Boys' Golf
- Girls' Golf
- Boys' Soccer
- Girls' Soccer
- Softball
- Boys' Swimming and Diving
- Girls' Swimming and Diving
- Boys' Tennis
- Girls' Tennis
- Boys' Track and Field
- Girls' Track and Field
- Volleyball
- Wrestling

=== Basketball ===
The 1946-1947 Men's Basketball team won the Indiana High School Boys Basketball Tournament against Terre Haute Garfield High School, 54–46.

== Notable alumni ==
- William Garrett - first African American Indiana "Mr. Basketball"
- Ken Gunning - college basketball player and head coach
- Kid Quill - American hip hop recording artist

== See also ==
- List of high schools in Indiana
