= Ken Gunning =

American basketball player and coach

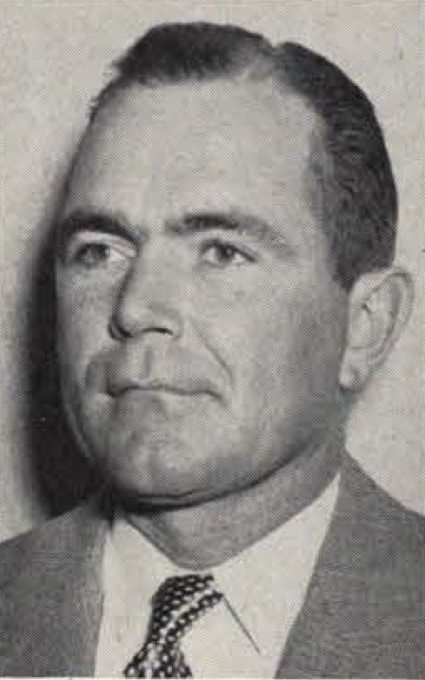
- Gunning from the 1949 Parnassus

Personal information
- Born: June 4, 1914 Shelbyville, Indiana, U.S.
- Died: April 2, 1991 (aged 76)
- Listed height: 5 ft 11 in (1.80 m)

Career information
- High school: Shelbyville (Shelbyville, Indiana)
- College: Indiana (1934–1937)
- Position: Guard / forward

Career history

Playing
- 1937–1938: Whiting Ciesar All-Americans
- 1945: Indianapolis Kautskys

Coaching
- 1938–1948: Western New Mexico
- 1948–1951: Wichita State
- 1951–1960: Connersville HS

Career highlights
- Second-team All-American – OWH (1937); 2× All-Big Ten (1935, 1936)

Kenneth Woodrow Gunning (June 4, 1914 – April 2, 1991) was an American professional basketball player and college coach. He played in the National Basketball League (NBL) for the Whiting Ciesar All-Americans in 15 games during the 1937–38 NBL season, and also in one game for the Indianapolis Kautskys in 1945–46.

A native of Shelbyville, Indiana, Gunning lettered for the Indiana Hoosiers men's basketball team from 1934 to 1935 through 1936–37. He led the team in scoring all three seasons, was twice named an All-Big Ten Conference player, and as a senior was named a second-team NCAA All-American by Omaha World-Herald. He also lettered for the baseball and track teams.

After his lone season with the Whiting Ciesar All-Americans, Gunning coached Western New Mexico University (WNMU) for 10 seasons (1938–1948), followed by a three-season stint leading Wichita State University (1948–1951). During his time at WNMU, Gunning played also semi-professional baseball in 1939 for the Moline Plowboys of the Illinois–Indiana–Iowa League. He also coached Wichita State's baseball team for three years.
