= Grover Museum =

Museum in Indiana, US

Grover Center: Museum and Historical Society
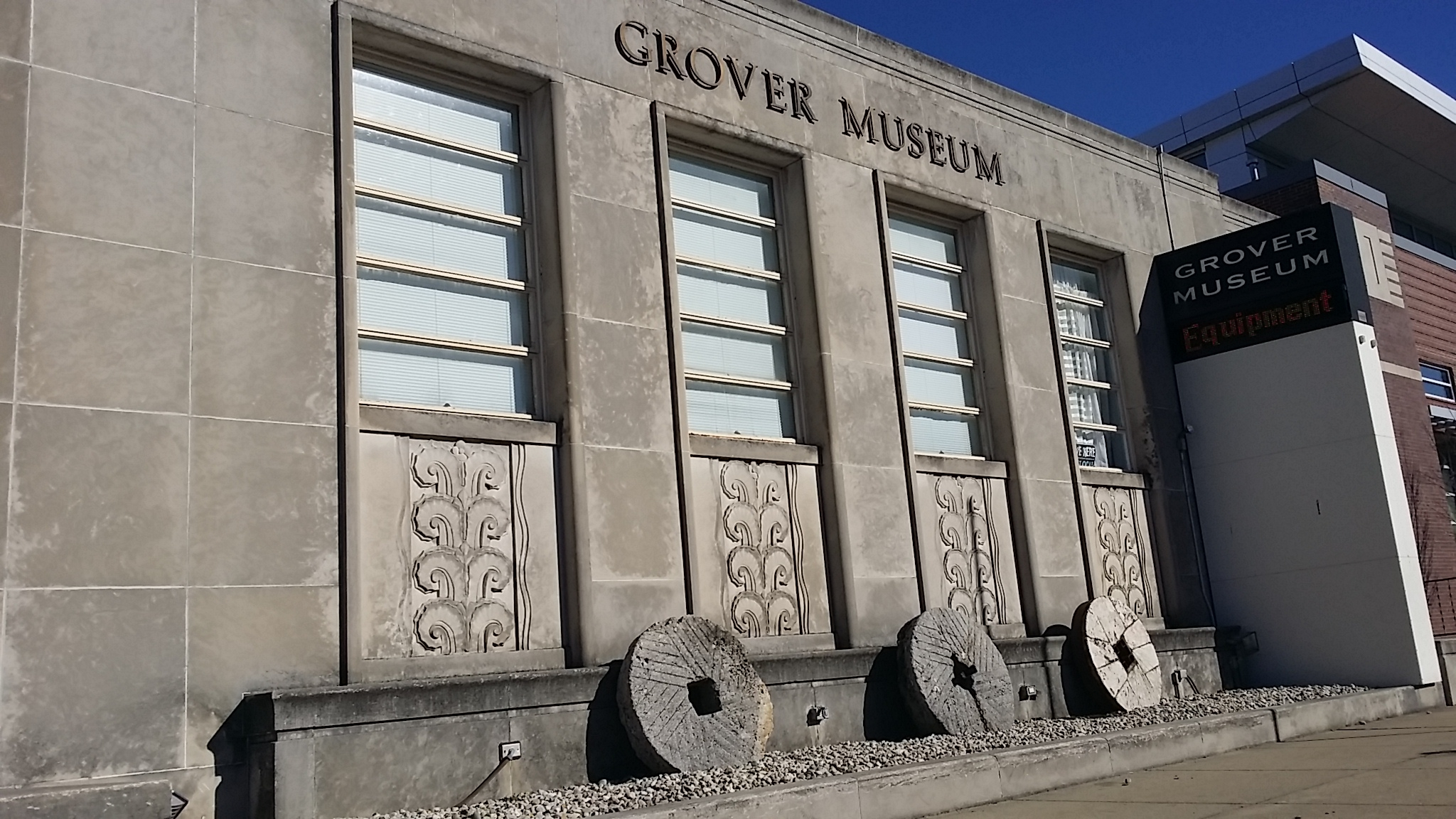
- Grover Center: Museum and Historical Society
- Former name: The Louis H. and Lena Firn Grover Museum
- Established: 1981
- Location: 52 W. Broadway; Shelbyville, Indiana 46176
- Coordinates: 39.5229894°N 85.7784903°W
- Type: History
- Visitors: 6,500 (2018)
- Founder: Shelby County Historical Society
- Director: Sarah Richardt
- President: Vince Bradburn
- Owner: Shelby County Historical Society
- Parking: Street parking, small lot behind museum
- Website: www.grovercenter.org

The Grover Center: Museum and Historical Society, formally known as the Louis H. and Lena Firn Grover Museum, is a local history museum located in Shelbyville, Indiana, USA, and is operated by the Shelby County Historical Society, whose headquarters are located in the building. The museum has three rotating galleries and three permanent galleries, which are used to display artifacts that are historically significant to Shelby County, Indiana.

The Shelby County Historical Society took over the building, which was previously the Benevolent and Protective Order of the Elks Lodge No. 457, in 1980 and opened the museum in 1981.

== As Benevolent and Protective Order of the Elks Lodge No. 457 ==
The Benevolent and Protective Order of the Elks were instituted in Shelbyville in 1898. By the end of the 1940s, the B.P.O.E. had grown in such a way that their previous building at 52 W. Washington St. was no longer suitable for their needs, and construction was started on a new lodge in 1950. By July 16, 1950, the group laid the cornerstone of the building, and to commemorate the event, placed several artifacts in the cornerstone, including a history of Shelbyville Lodge No. 457; the names of the first officers and the 45 charter members; a photostatic copy of the charter; an official copy of the real estate deed; a list of past exalted rulers; a copy of minutes in which the new building planning was authorized; the names of the building planning committee; the names of the general supervision committee for the building project; the names of the general contractor, subcontractors, and architect; a list of present officers, officials, and employees of the lodge; copies of newspaper articles pertaining to construction of the building and laying of the stone; a copy of the by-laws of the Grand Lodge and the local lodge and ritual; and a United States flag.

Over the course of the following year, the Shelby Construction Co., the contractor for the building, built the B.P.O.E.'s new lodge, which measured 170 feet, six inches in length and 59 feet, six inches in length. The building had 32 rooms, with a main dining room / ballroom, a private dining room, a rathskeller, a lodge room, a kitchen, a cocktail lounge, two ladies' lounges, and a browsing room. The building's grand opening was from March 28 through March 31, 1951, and featured a smörgåsbord, bridge and entertainment, dinners, and a special lodge meeting and initiation, with the state championship degree team from Indianapolis Lodge No. 31 initiating 20 new members into the lodge, bringing the Elks active membership to nearly 700.

During the 1970s, the B.P.O.E. moved out of that location and to what is now Bear Chase Golf Club.

== Museum and Historical Society ==
In 1922, the Shelby County Historical Society was formed, but was only active for a couple years. In 1951, a few local community members decided to revive the organization, with the first meeting being held in the Shelby County Commissioners' room at the Shelby County Courthouse. More members were added, and by 1967, enough interest had developed in the community to hold the inaugural Blue River Valley Pioneer Craft Fair, which allows attendees to visit living historians throughout the Shelby County Fairground, and watch them as they reproduce crafts from a bygone era.

As more interest built in local history, the group decided they needed a place to properly store and display the artifacts that were being donated to them. In 1978, Lena Firn Grover willed her farm to the organization, which sold it for $280,000 on November 12, 1979. The money raised in that sale allowed the museum to make a bid for the then-defunct B.P.O.E. Lodge on December 17, 1979, and on January 10, 1980, the bid was approved.

The group first met in the museum on April 10, 1980, and also began making renovations to the building, at an estimated cost of $75,000. Nearly a year later, on March 5, 1981, the Shelby County Historical Society dedicated the Grover Museum, and opened its first exhibit, which was "From the Land, Shelby County Farming."

That same year, the museum held its first Quilt Show exhibit, which continues annually today.

In 1988, construction began on the permanent exhibit, "The Streets of Old Shelby," which is a life-sized village that features a number of shops and businesses that might have been found in Shelby County in the late 1800s and early 1900s.The project, which took 15 years to complete, was built in the Elks' former ballroom.

In addition to "The Streets of Old Shelby," which is a built-to-scale recreation of the village, the museum also houses a railroad exhibit, which features a railroad diorama, with two working trains, as well as an interurban train, which runs around the top of the room. During the third Saturday of the month, visitors can receive free root beer floats in the Emporium.
