= Shelby =

Shelby may refer to:

== Places ==
=== United States ===
- Shelby, Alabama, a census-designated place and unincorporated community
- Shelby, Indiana, an unincorporated town
- Shelby, Iowa, a city
- Shelby, Oceana County, Michigan, a village
- Shelby, Mississippi, a city
- Shelby, Missouri, an unincorporated community
- Shelby, Montana, a city
- Shelby, Nebraska, a village
- Shelby, New York, a town
- Shelby, North Carolina, a small city
- Shelby, Ohio, a city
- Shelby, Texas, an unincorporated town
- Shelby, Wisconsin, a town
  - Shelby (community), Wisconsin, an unincorporated community
- Camp Shelby, a military post adjacent to Hattiesburg, Mississippi
- Fort Shelby (Michigan), a military fort in Detroit, in use from 1779 to 1826
- Fort Shelby (Wisconsin), an American military installation built in 1814 and destroyed by the British in 1815
- Shelby County (disambiguation)
- Shelby Township (disambiguation)

=== Elsewhere ===
- Mount Shelby, a mountain in Antarctica

== Arts and entertainment ==
- Shelby (album), a 2019 album by Lil Skies
- Shelby (film), a 2014 film starring Chevy Chase
- Shelby (toy), a Furby Friend toy released in 2001
- Shelby (dog), a dog actor

== People and fictional characters ==
- Shelby (name), a list of people and fictional characters with the given name or surname
- Uncle Shelby, the pen name used by Shel Silverstein (1930–1999) when writing children's books

== Transportation ==
- AC Cobra (Shelby Cobra)
- Shelby American, an American automobile manufacturer
- Ford Shelby Cobra Concept
- Shelby Cycle Company, a bicycle manufacturer in Shelby, Ohio
- Shelby Mustang, a higher performance variant of the Ford Mustang
- Shelby SuperCars, former name of SSC North America, an American automobile manufacturer
- USS Shelby (APA-105), a World War II attack transport

== Other uses ==
- Shelby County v. Holder, a U.S. Supreme Court case sometimes referred to as Shelby

== See also ==
- "Shelby '68", a song by Kylie Minogue from Golden
- Selby
- Shelbyville (disambiguation)
