= Steering and policy committees of the United States House of Representatives =

In the United States House of Representatives, the two major political parties maintain policy and steering committees. Their primary purpose is to assign fellow party members to other House committees, and they also advise party leaders on policy.

The House Democratic Caucus has a combined single steering and policy committee, while the House Republican Conference divides the duties between two groups: a policy committee and a steering committee.

== House Democratic Steering and Policy Committee ==
The House Democratic Steering and Policy Committee is chaired by the party leader in the House, which has been Hakeem Jeffries since 2023, in his capacities as Minority Leader. The party leader also appoints three co-chairs to assist him on the committee. For the 117th Congress, the co-chairs were Reps. Eric Swalwell (CA-15), Barbara Lee (CA-13), and Cheri Bustos (IL-17).

The statutory members include the full caucus leadership and chief deputy whip team and the chairs or ranking members (depending on a majority or minority, respectively) of the exclusive committees: Appropriations, Budget, Energy, Financial Services, Rules, and Ways and Means. Additional members are either directly appointed by the caucus leader (Speaker in the majority or Minority Leader in the minority), elected as regional representatives, and an elected representative of the freshman class.

On November 28, 2018, Pelosi, the Speaker of the 116th Congress, announced that the Committee would now have three co-chairs instead of two.

As of the 119th Congress, Democratic Representatives are no longer grouped into official regions.

=== Membership ===
==== 119th Congress ====
- Chair: Hakeem Jeffries (NY)
- Co-Chairs: Robin Kelly (IL), Nanette Barragán (CA)
- Pete Aguilar (CA)
- Ted Lieu (CA)
- Rob Menendez (NJ)
- Katherine Clark (MA)
- Salud Carbajal (CA)
- Matt Cartwright (PA)
- Judy Chu (CA)
- Jim Clyburn (SC)
- Steve Cohen (TN)
- Angie Craig (MN)
- Henry Cuellar (TX)
- Sharice Davids (KS)
- Madeleine Dean (PA)
- Steny Hoyer (MD)

==== 117th Congress ====
The members of the committee for the 117th Congress (2021–2022) were:

- Chair: Nancy Pelosi (CA-12)
- Co-Chairs: Eric Swalwell (CA-15), Barbara Lee (CA-13), Cheri Bustos (IL-17)
- Caucus Co-Chairs, Policy and Communications: Ted Lieu (CA-33), Debbie Dingell (MI-12), Matt Cartwright (PA-8), Joe Neguse (CO-2)
- Caucus Leadership: Steny Hoyer (MD-5), Jim Clyburn (SC-6), Katherine Clark (MA-5), Hakeem Jeffries (NY-8), Pete Aguilar (CA-31), Sean Patrick Maloney (NY-18), Colin Allred (TX-32), Mondaire Jones (NY-17)
- Chief Deputy Whips: Jan Schakowsky (IL-9), G. K. Butterfield (NC-1), Henry Cuellar (TX-28), Sheila Jackson Lee (TX-18), Dan Kildee (MI-5), Stephanie Murphy (FL-7), Jimmy Panetta (CA-20), Terri Sewell (AL-7), Debbie Wasserman Schultz (FL-23), Peter Welch (VT-AL)
- Regional Representatives: Lucille Roybal-Allard (CA-40), Anna Eshoo (CA-18), Betty McCollum (MN-4), Robin Kelly (IL-2), Susie Lee (NV-3), Raúl Grijalva (AZ-3), Steve Cohen (TN-9), Frederica Wilson (FL-24), Anthony Brown (MD-4), Joyce Beatty (OH-3), Paul Tonko (NY-20), Annie McLane Kuster (NH-2)
- Committee Chairs: Rosa DeLauro (CT-3), John Yarmuth (KY-3), Frank Pallone (NJ-6), Maxine Waters (CA-43), Jim McGovern (MA-2), Richard Neal (MA-1)
- Freshman Class Representative: Nikema Williams (GA-5)
- Appointed Members: David Cicilline (RI-1), Angie Craig (MN-2), Madeleine Dean (PA-4), Diana DeGette (CO-1), Suzan DelBene (WA-1), Mike Doyle (PA-18), Veronica Escobar (TX-16), Josh Harder (CA-10), Sara Jacobs (CA-53), Doris Matsui (CA-6), Bill Pascrell (NJ-9), Linda Sánchez (CA-38), Lauren Underwood (IL-14)

==== 115th Congress ====
The members of the committee for the 115th Congress (2017–2018) were:

- Chair: Nancy Pelosi (CA-12)
- Co-Chairs: Rosa DeLauro (CT-3), Eric Swalwell (CA-15)
- Vice Chair and Parliamentarian: Jared Polis (CO-2)
- Vice Chair: Barbara Lee (CA-13)
- Caucus Leadership: Steny Hoyer (MD-5), Jim Clyburn (SC-6), Cheri Bustos (IL-17), David Cicilline (RI-1), Hakeem Jeffries (NY-8), Tony Cárdenas (CA-29)
- Chief Deputy Whips: G. K. Butterfield (NC-1), Joaquin Castro (TX-20), Diana DeGette (CO-1), Jan Schakowsky (IL-9), Debbie Wasserman Schultz (FL-23), Terri Sewell (AL-7), Peter Welch (VT-AL)
- Committee Leadership: John Yarmuth (KY-3), Frank Pallone (NJ-6), Maxine Waters (CA-43), Jim McGovern (MA-2), Rich Neal (MA-1)
- Appointed Members: Matt Cartwright (PA-17), Katherine Clark (MA-5), Steve Cohen (TN-9), John Delaney (MD-6), Mike Doyle (PA-14), John Garamendi (CA-3), Sheila Jackson Lee (TX-18), Dan Kildee (MI-5), Derek Kilmer (WA-6), Raja Krishnamoorthi (IL-8), Betty McCollum (MN-4), Donald Norcross (NJ-1), Darren Soto (FL-9), Mike Thompson (CA-5)
- Regional Representatives: Judy Chu (CA-27), Doris Matsui (CA-6), Gwen Moore (WI-4), André Carson (IN-7), Dina Titus (NV-1), Lloyd Doggett (TX-35), Stacey Plaskett (VI-AL), Lois Frankel (FL-22), Bill Pascrell (NJ-9), Marcy Kaptur (OH-9), Gregory Meeks (NY-5), Mike Capuano (MA-7)
- Freshman Class Representative: Jamie Raskin (MD-8)

== House Republican Policy Committee ==
Jay Obernotle currently chairs the Policy Committee. When the Republicans are in the majority, the chair of the House Republican Policy Committee ranks fifth, below the Speaker of the House, Majority Leader, Majority Whip, and the Republican Conference Chairman. When the Republicans are in the minority, the Policy Committee chair ranks fourth, behind the Minority Leader, Minority Whip and Conference Chairman.

Statutory members include the full conference leadership, the committee chairs or ranking members (depending on a majority or minority) of Appropriations, Budget, Energy, Rules, and Ways and Means, and the elected leaders of the sophomore and freshman classes. Appointed members include regional representatives, at-large members, members from the standing committees, and designated appointees by the sophomore (2) and freshman (1) class leaders.

119th Congress

- Chair: Jay Obernotle (CA)
- John Rutherford (FL)
- Scott Franklin (FL)
- Morgan Luttrell (TX)
- Brandon Gill (TX)
- Andy Harris (MD/Small States)
- Claudia Tenney (Region 1)
- Dan Meuser (Region 2)
- Troy Balderson (Region 3)
- Sheri Biggs (Region 4)
- Greg Murphy (Region 5)
- Andrew Clyde (Region 6)
- John Rose (Region 7)
- Trent Kelly (Region 8)
- Jefferson Shreve (Region 9)
- Randy Feenstra (Region 10)
- Glenn Grothman (Region 11)
- Mike Flood (Region 12)
- Troy Downing (Region 13)
- Celeste Maloy (Region 14)
- Tom McClintock (Region 15)
- Michael Baumgartner (Freshman)
- Harriet Hageman (Sophomore)
- Rich McCormick (Sophomore)
- Joe Wilson (Designee)

Regional Representatives are restructured to reflect as closely as possible an equal number of Republican members from each region; the small state group is an additional region composed of states that have one or two Republican members. As of the 116th Congress, the regions are:

- 1: Maryland (1), New Jersey (1), New York (6), West Virginia (3) – 11 members total
- 2: Kentucky (5), Pennsylvania (9) – 14 members total
- 3: North Carolina (10), Virginia (4) – 14 members total
- 4: Georgia (9), South Carolina (5) – 14 members total
- 5: Alabama (6), Tennessee (7) – 13 members total
- 6: Illinois (5), Indiana (7) – 12 members total
- 7: Michigan (7), Wisconsin (5) – 12 members total
- 8: Arkansas (4), Louisiana (5), Mississippi (3), Puerto Rico (1) – 13 members total
- 9: Kansas (3), Colorado (3), Nebraska (3), Oklahoma (4) – 13 members total
- 10: American Samoa (1), Iowa (1), Minnesota (3), Missouri (6), North Dakota (1), South Dakota (1) – 13 members total
- 11: Alaska (1), Idaho (2), Montana (1), Nevada (1), Oregon (1), Utah (3), Washington (3), Wyoming (1) – 13 members total
- 12: Arizona (4), California (7) – 11 members total
- Small States: Alaska, America Samoa, Idaho, Iowa, Maryland, Montana, Nevada, New Jersey, North Dakota, Oregon, Puerto Rico, South Dakota, Wyoming – 14 members total
- Florida Region: 14 members total
- Ohio Region: 12 members total
- Texas Regions I and II: 14 members total

The members of the committee for the 115th Congress were:

- Chair: Luke Messer (IN-6)
- Conference Leadership: Paul Ryan (WI-1), Kevin McCarthy (CA-23), Steve Scalise (LA-1), Cathy McMorris Rodgers (WA-5), Steve Stivers (OH-15), Doug Collins (GA-9), Jason Smith (MO-8), Patrick McHenry (NC-10)
- Committee Leadership: Rodney Frelinghuysen (NJ-11), Steve Womack (AR-3), Greg Walden (OR-2), Pete Sessions (TX-32), Kevin Brady (TX-8)
- Sophomore and Freshman Class Leadership: Mimi Walters (CA-45), Paul Mitchell (MI-10)
- Regional Members: Elise Stefanik (NY-21), Brett Guthrie (KY-2), Vacant (Region 3), Austin Scott (GA-8), Gary Palmer (AL-6), Jackie Walorski (IN-2), Mike Gallagher (WI-8), Rick Crawford (AL-1), Markwayne Mullin (OK-2), Don Young (AK-AL), Mia Love (UT-4), Jenniffer González (PR-AL), Vacant (Texas Region I), Randy Weber (TX-14), John Rutherford (FL-4), Ed Royce (CA-39), Glenn Thompson (PA-5), Brad Wenstrup (OH-2)
- Sophomore and Freshman Class Members: Drew Ferguson (GA-3), John Katko (NY-24), Martha McSally (AZ-2)
- Committee Members: Jodey Arrington (TX-19), Chris Stewart (UT-2), Mike Coffman (CO-6), Dave Brat (VA-7), Glenn Grothman (WI-6), Morgan Griffith (VA-9), French Hill (AR-2), Joe Wilson (SC-2), Brian Fitzpatrick (PA-2), Raúl Labrador (ID-1), Bruce Westerman (AR-4), Jim Jordan (OH-4), Dennis Ross (FL-15), Steve Knight (CA-15), Jeff Denham (CA-10), Randy Hultgren (IL-14), Mike Bost (IL-12), Dave Schweikert (AZ-6)
- At-Large Members: Barbara Comstock (VA-10), Keith Rothfus (PA-12), Susan Brooks (IN-5), Dave Reichert (WA-8), Bruce Poliquin (ME-2), Tom Reed (NY-23)

Policy Committee Chairs

Name	Start	End	District
Joe Martin	January 3, 1949	January 3, 1959	MA-14
John Byrnes	January 3, 1959	February 23, 1965	WI-08
John Rhodes	February 23, 1965	December 7, 1973	AZ-01
Barber Conable	December 7, 1973	January 3, 1977	NY-35
Del Clawson	January 3, 1977	December 31, 1978	CA-33
Bud Shuster	January 3, 1979	January 3, 1981	PA-09
Dick Cheney	January 3, 1981	June 4, 1987	WY-AL
Jerry Lewis	June 4, 1987	January 3, 1989	CA-35
Mickey Edwards	January 3, 1989	January 3, 1993	OK-05
Henry Hyde	January 3, 1993	January 3, 1995	IL-06
Chris Cox	January 3, 1995	January 26, 2005	CA-47; CA-48
John Shadegg	January 26, 2005	January 13, 2006	AZ-03
Adam Putnam	February 1, 2006	January 3, 2007	FL-12
Thad McCotter	January 3, 2007	January 3, 2011	MI-11
Tom Price	January 3, 2011	January 3, 2013	GA-06
James Lankford	January 3, 2013	January 3, 2015	OK-05
Luke Messer	January 3, 2015	January 3, 2019	IN-06
Gary Palmer	January 3, 2019	January 3, 2025	AL-06
Kevin Hern	January 3, 2025	March 11, 2026	OK-01
Jay Obernolte	April 15, 2026	present	CA-23

== House Republican Steering Committee ==
For House Republicans, the steering committee is chaired by the party leader in the House, either the Speaker (if Republicans are in the majority) or the Minority (Floor) Leader (if Republicans are in the minority). Under rules adopted after the 1994 Republican Revolution, the House party leader (Speaker/Minority Leader) had five votes on the committee, the deputy leader (Majority Leader/Minority Whip) receives 2 votes, and all other members receive 1 vote for a total of 35 votes; a quorum requires 18 members. The current chairman of the Republican Steering Committee is Mike Johnson.

The Republican counterpart in the Senate is the Committee on Committees. Senate Republicans also operate a steering committee to discuss policy issues.

The members of the committee for the 117th Congress (2021–2022) were:

- Conference Leadership: Kevin McCarthy (CA-23), Steve Scalise (LA-1), Elise Stefanik (NY-21), Gary Palmer (AL-6), Mike Johnson (LA-4), Richard Hudson (NC-8), Drew Ferguson (GA-3), Tom Emmer (MN-6), Steve Stivers (OH-15), Don Young (AK-AL)
- Regional Members: Elise Stefanik (NY-21), Mike Kelly (PA-16), Barry Loudermilk (GA-11), Mike Rogers (AL-3), Jim Banks (IN-3), Fred Upton (MI-6), Steve Womack (AR-3), Tom Cole (OK-4), Blaine Luetkemeyer (MO-3), Cathy McMorris Rodgers (WA-5), Devin Nunes (CA-22), Patrick McHenry (NC-10), Vern Buchanan (FL-16), David Joyce (OH-14), Kevin Brady (TX-8), John Carter (TX-31), and Kelly Armstrong (ND-AL) as small state representative.
- Junior Class Representatives: William Timmons (SC-4), August Pfluger (TX-11)
- Appointed Member: Debbie Lesko (AZ-8)
- Relevant Committee Leader: Rotating

The House Republican Conference approved changes to the steering committee's structure on November 19, 2015. These changes include a reduction in the Speaker's weighted votes from five to four (while giving him the right to appoint a new at-large member) and phased membership adjustments. The six committee leaders that were all previously given standing membership (Appropriations, Budget, Energy and Commerce, Financial Services, Rules, and Ways and Means) were removed and immediately replaced by six at-large members. Additionally, any committee leader whose committee membership is under consideration by the Steering panel will sit on a rotating basis. The committee leaders' six vacant seats are to be elected by the whole Conference at-large by the end of 2015, and they will serve until the end of the 114th Congress (January 3, 2017). Following the 2016 general election for the next Congress, these at-large elected seats will be replaced by six additional regional representatives, with the new regions to be determined at that time.

== See also ==
- Standing committee (United States Congress)
- United States Senate Democratic Steering and Outreach Committee
