= Addison Township, Shelby County, Indiana =

Addison Township
- Township
- Coordinates: 39°31′32″N 85°46′09″W
- Country: United States
- State: Indiana
- County: Shelby

Government
  - Type: Indiana township

Area
  - Total: 28.22 sq mi (73.1 km^{2})
  - Land: 27.73 sq mi (71.8 km^{2})
  - Water: 0.5 sq mi (1.3 km^{2})
- Elevation: 764 ft (233 m)

Population (2020)
  - Total: 21,459
  - Density: 742.5/sq mi (286.7/km^{2})
- ZIP code: 46176
- Area codes: 317 and 463
- FIPS code: 18-00568
- GNIS feature ID: 453083

Addison Township is one of fourteen townships in Shelby County, Indiana. As of the 2010 census, its population was 20,585 and it contained 9,237 housing units.

Addison Township was organized in 1823.

== Geography ==
According to the 2010 census, the township has a total area of 28.22 square miles (73.1 km^{2}), of which 27.73 square miles (71.8 km^{2}) (or 98.26%) is land and 0.5 square miles (1.3 km^{2}) (or 1.77%) is water.

=== Cities and towns ===
- Shelbyville

=== Unincorporated towns ===
- Beech Brook
- Knighthood Grove
- Rolling Ridge
- Walkerville
