= Shelby Township =

Shelby Township may refer to:

== Indiana ==
- Shelby Township, Jefferson County, Indiana
- Shelby Township, Ripley County, Indiana
- Shelby Township, Shelby County, Indiana
- Shelby Township, Tippecanoe County, Indiana

== Iowa ==
- Shelby Township, Shelby County, Iowa, in Shelby County, Iowa

== Michigan ==
- Shelby Charter Township, Macomb County, Michigan
- Shelby, Oceana County, Michigan

== Minnesota ==
- Shelby Township, Blue Earth County, Minnesota

== South Dakota ==
- Shelby Township, Brown County, South Dakota, in Brown County, South Dakota

== See also ==
- Shelby (disambiguation)
