= Porter Pool Bathhouse =

- U.S. National Register of Historic Places
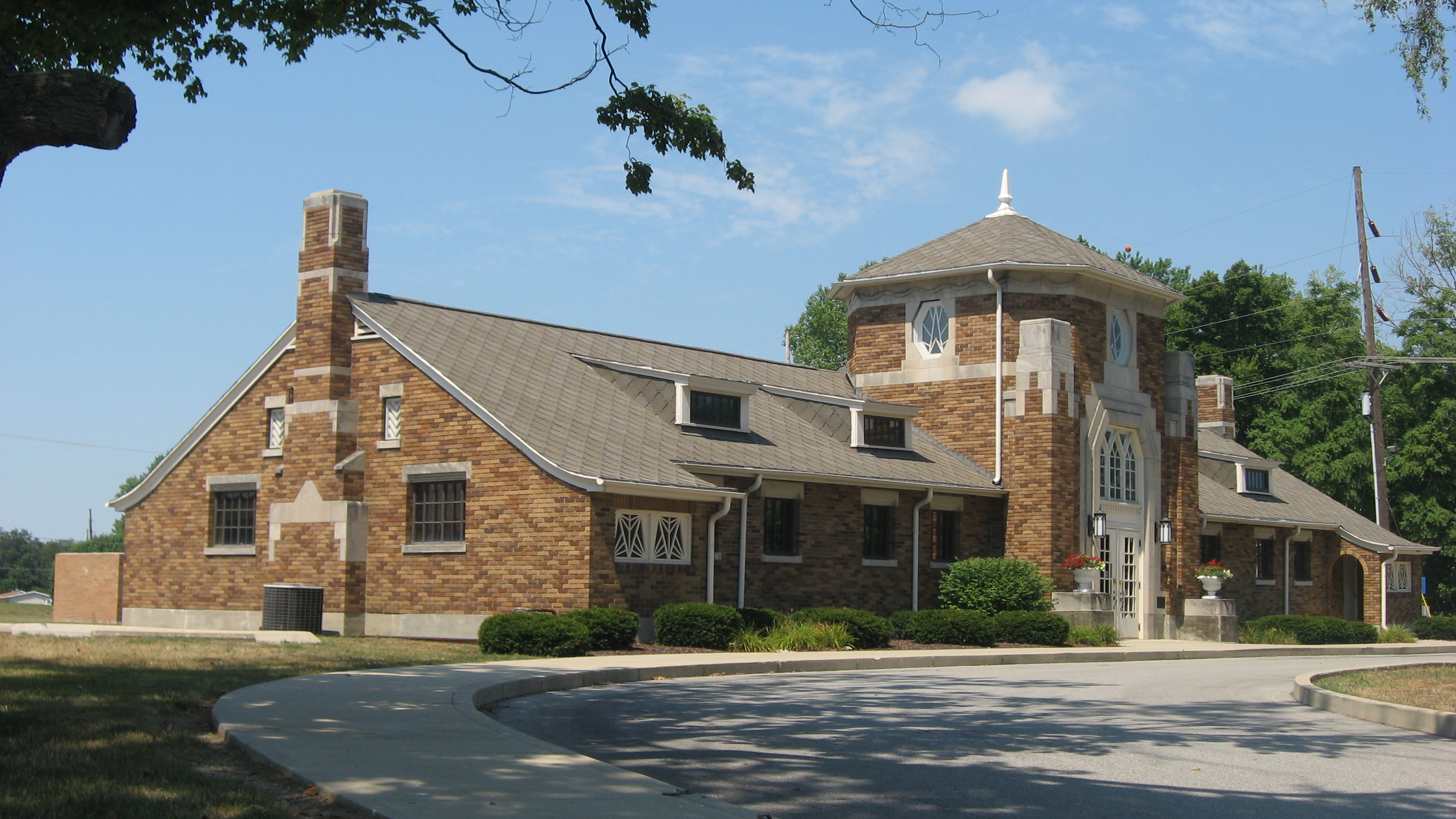
- Porter Pool Bathhouse, August 2011

- Location within Indiana Location within the United States
- Location: 501 N. Harrison St., Shelbyville, Indiana
- Coordinates: 39°31′40″N 85°46′17″W
- Area: 4.5 acres (1.8 ha)
- Built: 1930
- Built by: Bohlen, D.A. & Sons; Shelby Construction Co.
- Architectural style: Art Deco
- NRHP reference No.: 01001348
- Added to NRHP: December 7, 2001

Porter Pool Bathhouse is a historic bathhouse located at Shelbyville, Indiana. It was built in 1930, and is a 1 1/2-story, rectangular, Art Deco style brick building.

It was listed on the National Register of Historic Places in 2001.

Upon closure of Porter Pool, the property and building has since been repurposed as the Shelby County Tourism and Visitors Bureau Welcome Center and the Shelby County Chamber of Commerce. <httpl://www.shelbycountytourism.com>
