= Shelby County Courthouse (Indiana) =

- U.S. National Register of Historic Places
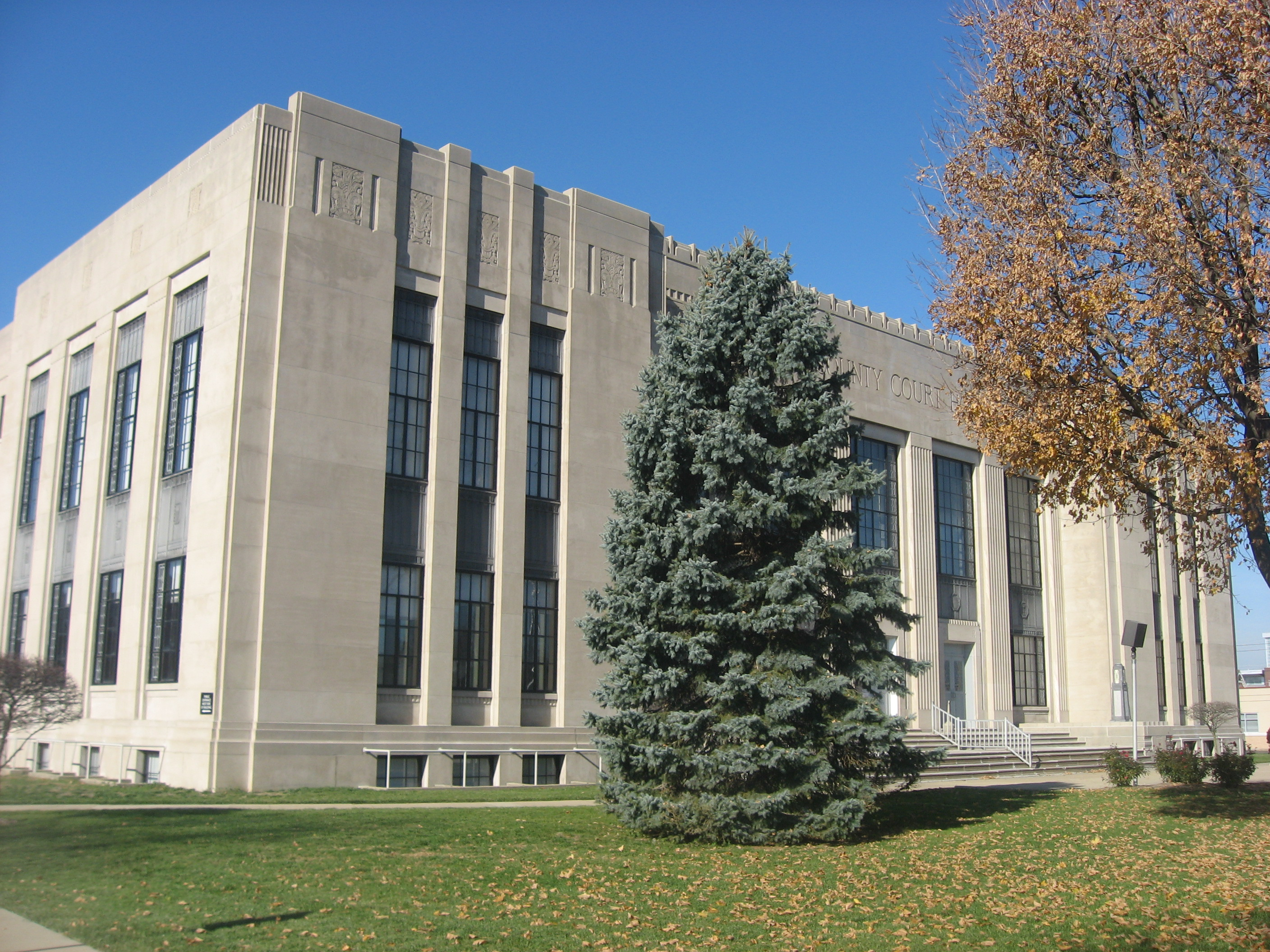
- Shelby County Courthouse, November 2013

- Location within Indiana Location within the United States
- Location: 407 S. Harrison St., Shelbyville, Indiana
- Coordinates: 39°31′16″N 85°46′40″W
- Area: 1.084 acres (0.439 ha)
- Built: 1936-1937
- Architect: Bohlen, D.A., and Son
- Architectural style: Art Deco
- NRHP reference No.: 11000917
- Added to NRHP: December 15, 2011

Shelby County Courthouse is a historic courthouse located at Shelbyville, Indiana. It was built in 1936–1937, and is a two- to three-story, rectangular, Art Deco style limestone building. The building features a recessed five bay central section with two-story, fluted Doric order pilasters and bas relief panels. Also on the property is a contributing 1931 statue of an American Civil War soldier. The building's construction was funded in part by the Public Works Administration.

It was listed on the National Register of Historic Places in 2011.
