= Lora B. Pearson School =

- U.S. National Register of Historic Places
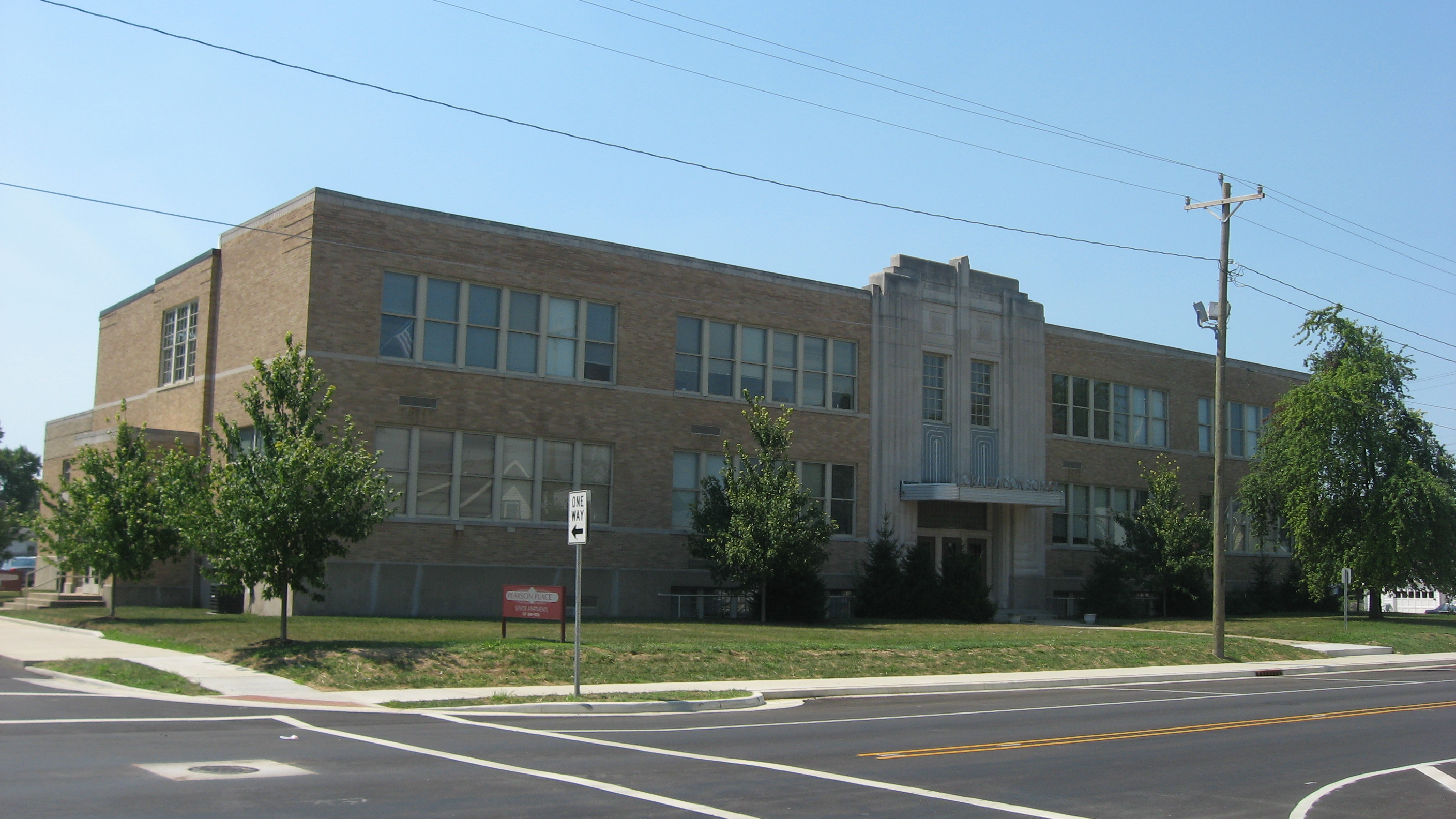
- Lora B. Pearson School, August 2011

- Location within Indiana Location within the United States
- Location: 115 W. Colescott St., Shelbyville, Indiana
- Coordinates: 39°31′3″N 85°46′43″W
- Area: 1.2 acres (0.49 ha)
- Built: 1939
- Architect: Bohlen, D.A. & Son
- Architectural style: Art Deco
- MPS: Indiana's Public Common and High Schools MPS
- NRHP reference No.: 09001136
- Added to NRHP: December 24, 2009

Lora B. Pearson School, also known as Colescott School and School No. 4, is a historic school building located at Shelbyville, Indiana. It was built in 1939, and is a three-story, rectangular, Art Deco style reinforced concrete building faced in brick and limestone. Funding for the school was provided in part by the Public Works Administration. The school closed in 2000 and was converted to senior apartments.

It was listed on the National Register of Historic Places in 2009.
