= John Hamilton House =

Historic house in Indiana, United States

- U.S. National Register of Historic Places
- U.S. Historic district – Contributing property
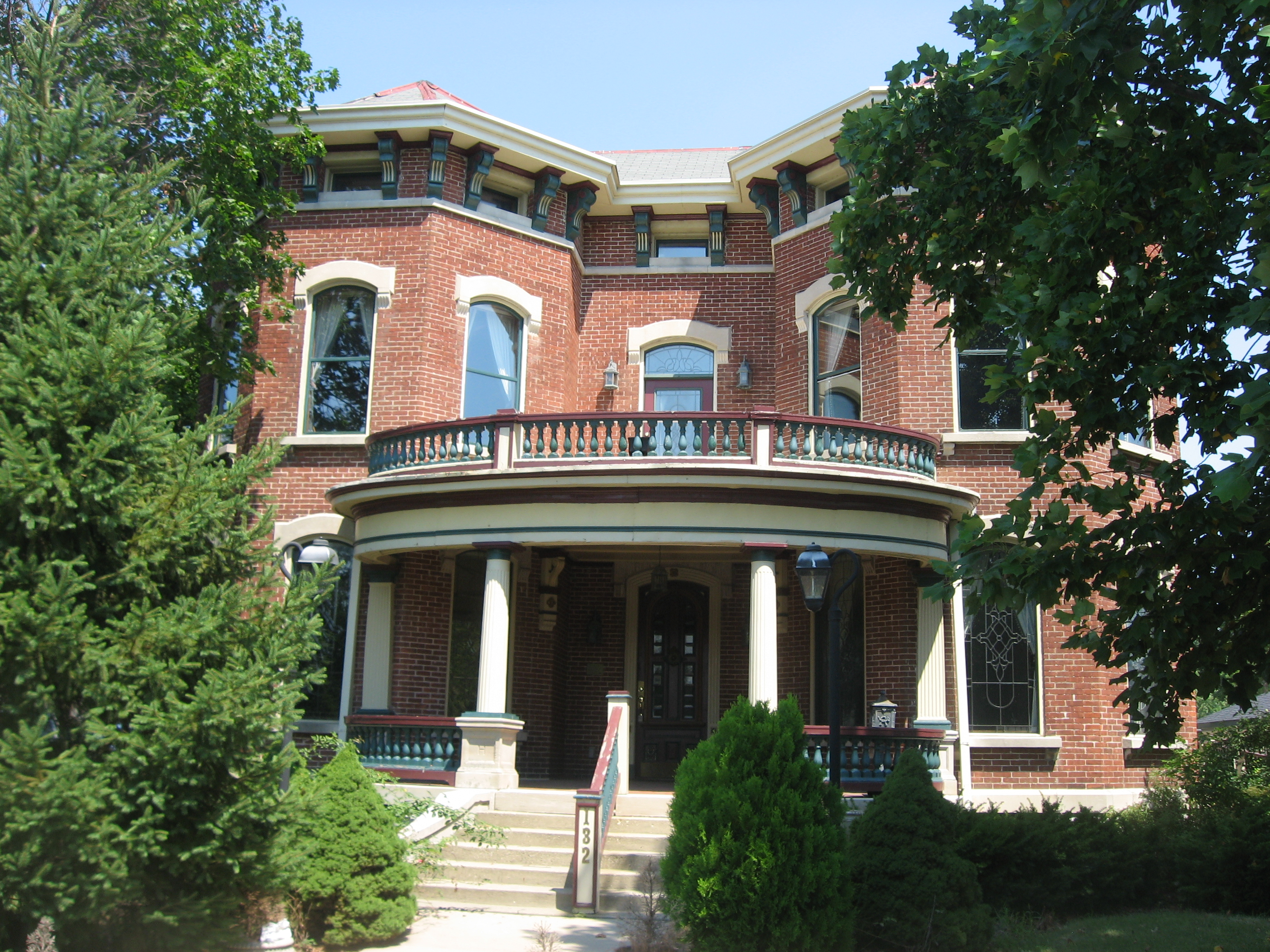
- John Hamilton House, August 2011

- Location within Indiana Location within the United States
- Location: 132 W. Washington St., Shelbyville, Indiana
- Coordinates: 39°31′28″N 85°46′48″W
- Area: less than one acre
- Built: 1853
- Architectural style: Italianate
- NRHP reference No.: 79000043
- Added to NRHP: June 4, 1979

John Hamilton House, also known as the Hamilton House, is a historic home located at Shelbyville, Indiana. It was built in 1853, and is a 2 1/2-story, rectangular, Italianate style brick dwelling. It has a slate roof and sits on a limestone block foundation. The front facade features segmental arched windows, and two two-story projecting polygonal bays flanking a semi-circular one-story porch supported by Doric order columns added about 1910.

It was listed on the National Register of Historic Places in 1979. It is located in the West Side Historic District.
