= Shelbyville Commercial Historic District =

Historic district in Indiana, United States

- U.S. National Register of Historic Places
- U.S. Historic district
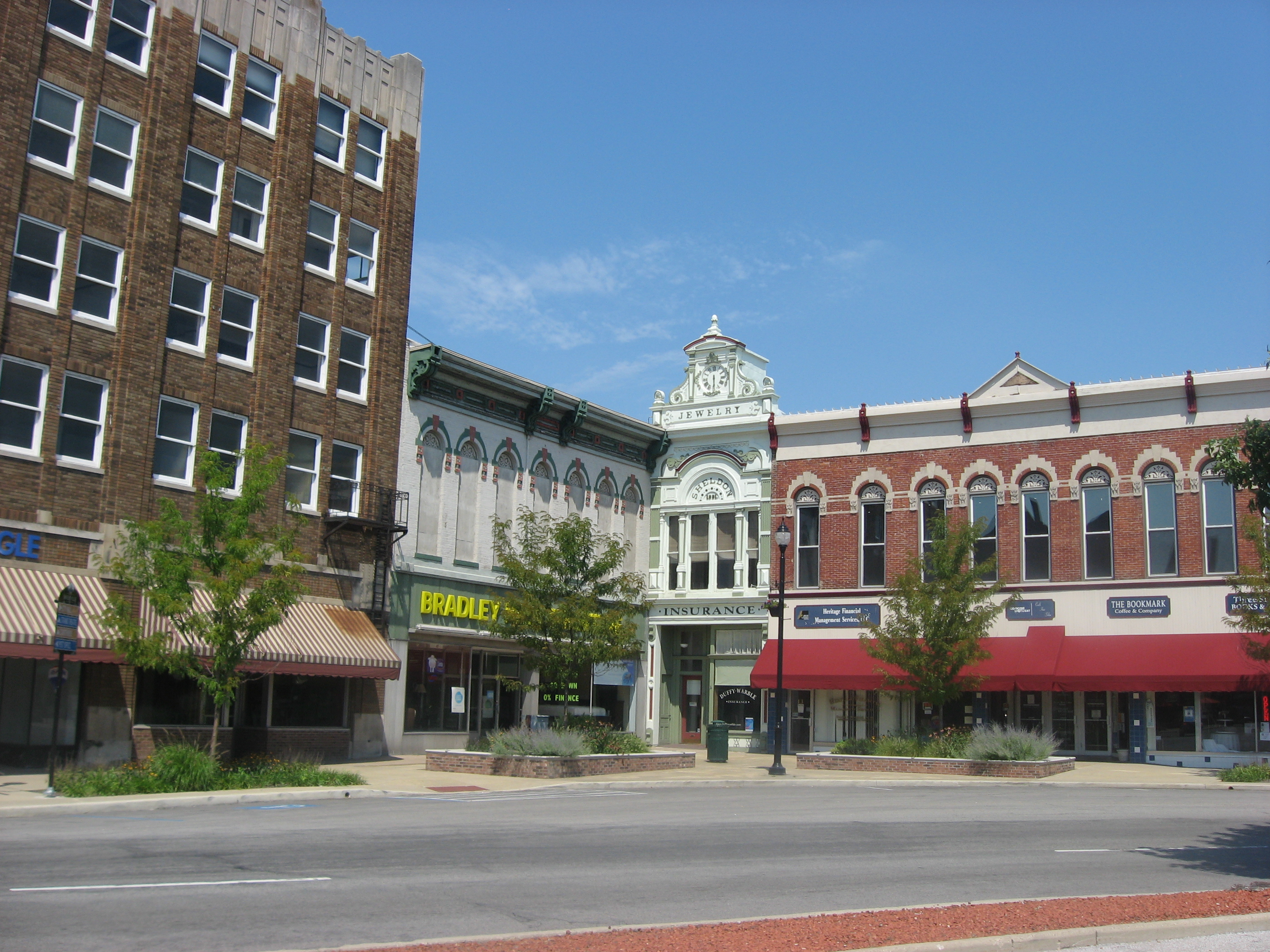
- Shelbyville Commercial Historic District, August 2011

- Location within Indiana Location within the United States
- Location: Roughly bounded by Broadway, Tompkins, Mechanic, and Noble Sts., Shelbyville, Indiana
- Coordinates: 39°31′27″N 85°46′33″W
- Area: 41.5 acres (16.8 ha)
- Built: 1822
- Architect: Multiple
- Architectural style: Late 19th And 20th Century Revivals, Late Victorian, Arts & Crafts
- NRHP reference No.: 84001638
- Added to NRHP: August 9, 1984

Shelbyville Commercial Historic District is a national historic district located at Shelbyville, Indiana. The district encompasses 149 contributing buildings, one contributing site, and two contributing objects in the central business district of Shelbyville. It developed between about 1822 and the 1930s, and includes notable examples of Italianate, Second Empire, Beaux-Arts, Classical Revival, and Art Deco style architecture. Notable contributing resources include the Shelbyville Central Schools Administrative Offices (1912), Carnegie Library (1902), First Baptist Church (1903), St. Joseph Catholic Church and School (1908), Civic Center (1932), Melton Jewelry Store (1886), Blessing-Deprez Building (1869), Knights of Pythias (1901), Cherry Building (1889), I.O.O.F. Building (1895), Old High School Building (1886), and a statue of Charles Major (1929).

It was listed on the National Register of Historic Places in 1984.
