= West Side Historic District (Shelbyville, Indiana) =

Historic district in Indiana, United States

- U.S. National Register of Historic Places
- U.S. Historic district
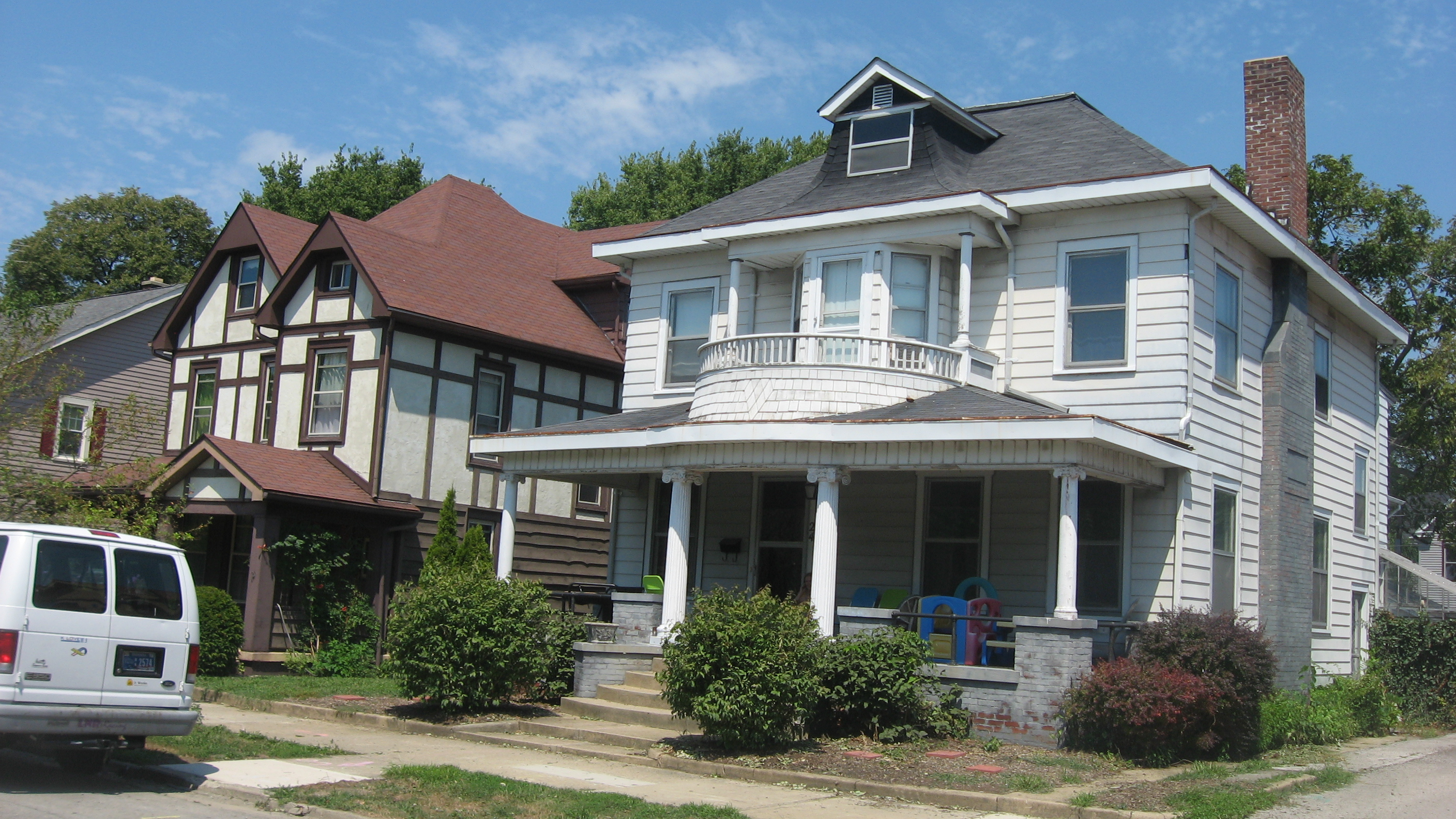
- Shelbyville West Side Historic District, August 2011

- Location within Indiana Location within the United States
- Location: Roughly bounded by W. Pennsylvania, N. Harrison, N. and S. Thompkins, W. Hendricks, Montgomery, & N. Conrey, Shelbyville, Indiana
- Coordinates: 39°31′31″N 85°46′54″W
- Area: 105 acres (42 ha)
- Architect: Harris & Shopbell
- Architectural style: Colonial Revival, Stick/eastlake, Queen Anne
- NRHP reference No.: 90000099
- Added to NRHP: February 9, 1990

West Side Historic District is a national historic district located at Shelbyville, Indiana. The district encompasses 373 contributing buildings and four contributing structures in a predominantly residential section of Shelbyville. It developed between about 1853 and the 1939, and includes notable examples of Queen Anne, Colonial Revival, and Stick Style / Eastlake movement style architecture. Located in the district is the separately listed John Hamilton House. Other notable buildings include the Peter Metzger House, Joseph Acre House, Earl Karmire House, Charles Davis House, Charles Birely House, Harry Whitcomb House, First Christian Church (1901), C.H. Campbell House, George McConnell House, First Presbyterian Church (1885), John Randall House (c. 1880), Alfred Major House, Frank C Sheldon House, and Edward Thurston House.

It was listed on the National Register of Historic Places in 1990.
