= Shelbyville High School (Indiana) =

- U.S. National Register of Historic Places
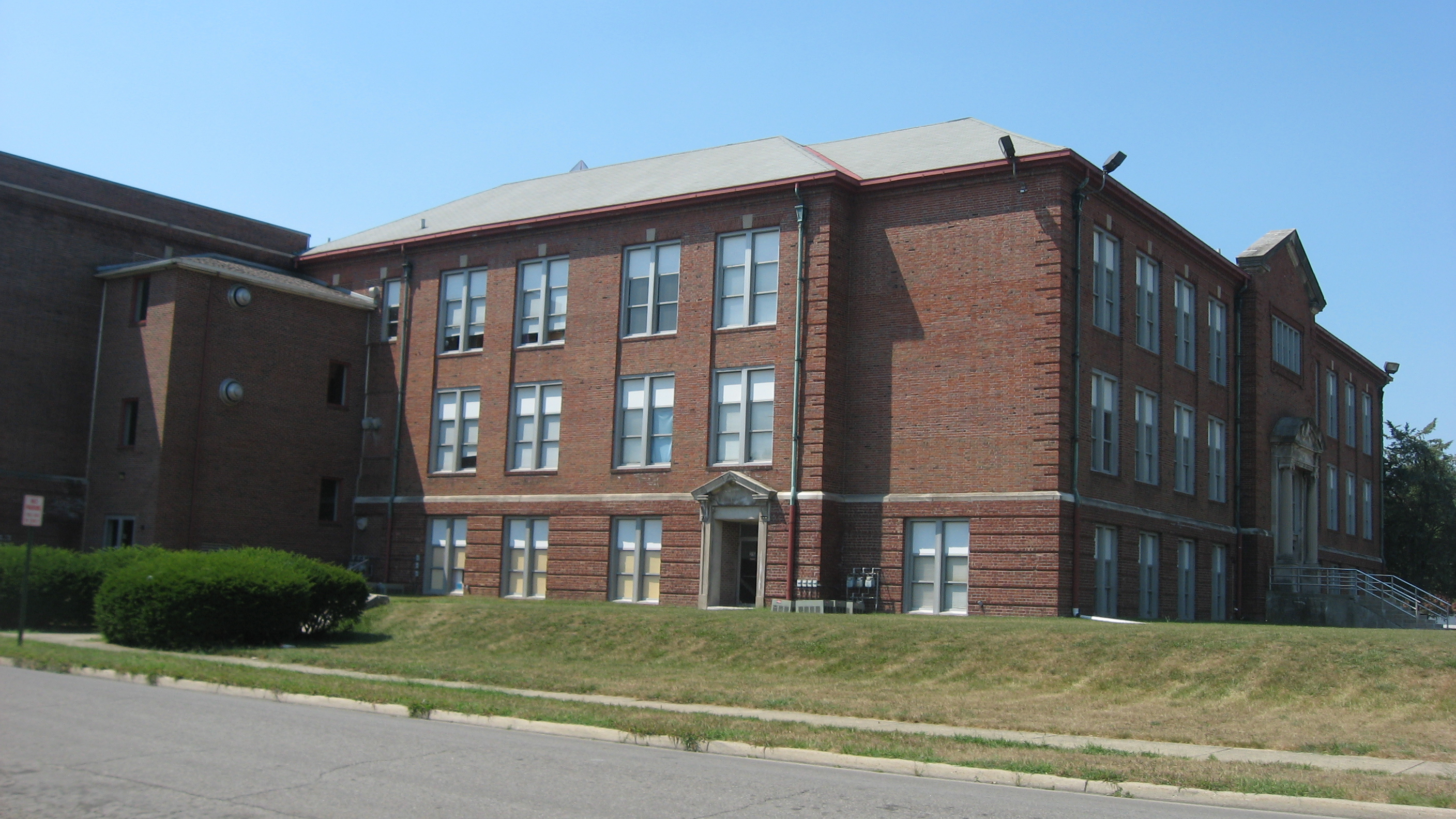
- Front and eastern side

- Location within Indiana Location within the United States
- Location: Jct. of Second and Tompkins Sts., Shelbyville, Indiana
- Coordinates: 39°30′54″N 85°46′47″W
- Area: 3.8 acres (1.5 ha)
- Built: 1911, 1917, 1922, 1942, 1977
- Architect: Ittner, William Butts; Dunlap, Elmer E.
- Architectural style: Classical Revival, Bungalow/craftsman
- NRHP reference No.: 95001535
- Added to NRHP: January 11, 1996

The Shelbyville High School is a historic school complex located at Shelbyville, Indiana. The high school was designed by architects William Butts Ittner and built in 1911. It is a two-story, Neoclassical style brick building on a raised basement. Attached to the high school is the similarly styled, 2 1/2-story junior high school designed by Elmer E. Dunlap and built in 1917. The Arts and Crafts inspired two-story, brick gymnasium was added in 1922. A shop addition was constructed in 1942, and was connected to the junior high school by a concrete block addition in 1977. The school buildings have been converted to apartments and the gymnasium is used for community recreational activities.

It was listed on the National Register of Historic Places in 1996.
