= Shelbyville, Indiana =

- City
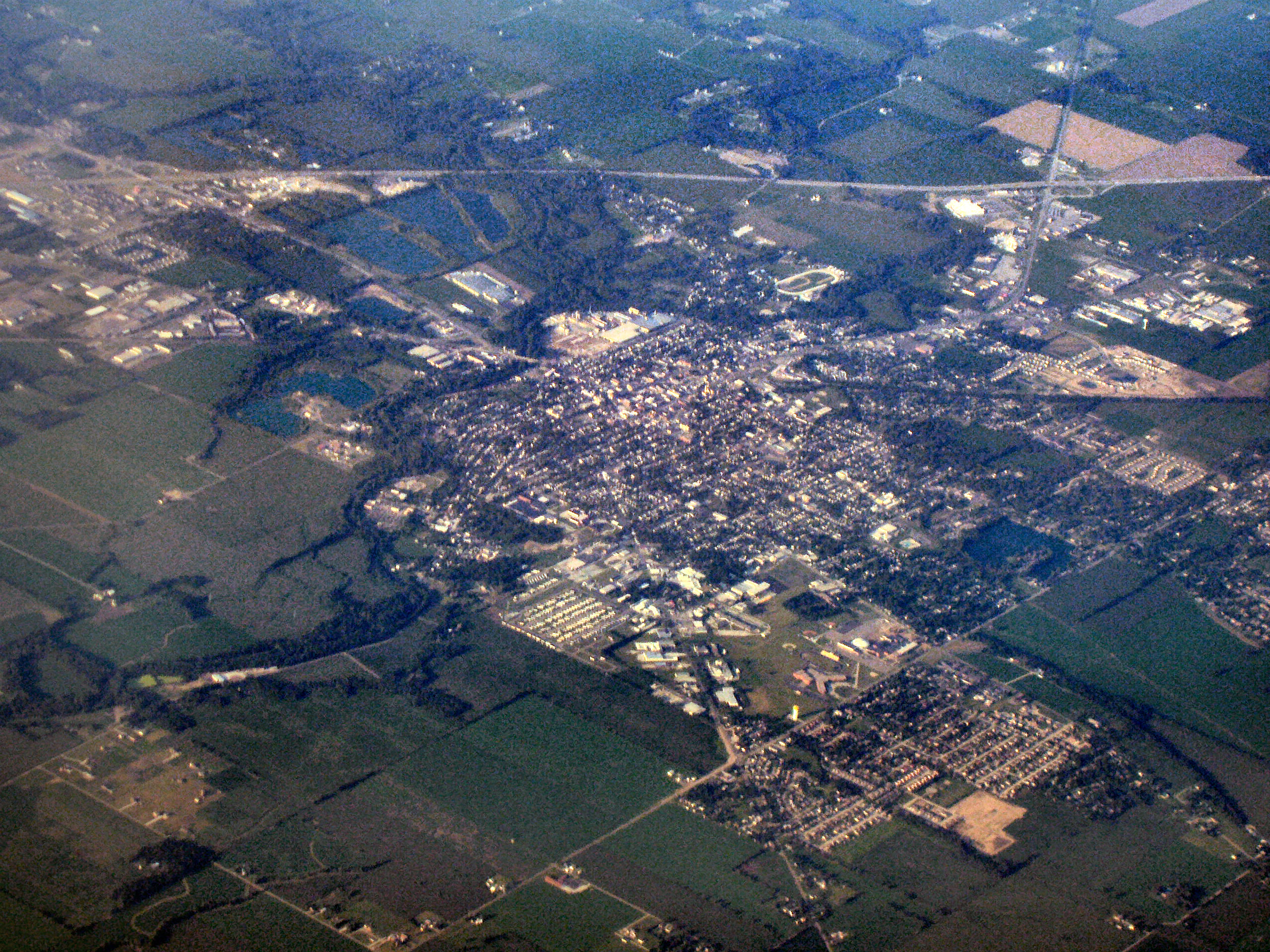
- Aerial photo of Shelbyville

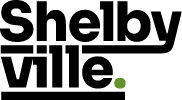
- Flag Seal Logo
- Motto: "Pride in Progress"
- Location of Shelbyville in Shelby County, Indiana.
- Coordinates: 39°31′00″N 85°45′35″W
- Country: United States
- State: Indiana
- County: Shelby
- Township: Addison, Brandywine, Shelby

Government
  - Mayor: Scott Furgeson (R)

Area
  - Total: 12.81 sq mi (33.19 km^{2})
  - Land: 12.55 sq mi (32.50 km^{2})
  - Water: 0.27 sq mi (0.69 km^{2}) 2.36%
- Elevation: 761 ft (232 m)

Population (2020)
  - Total: 20,067
  - Density: 1,599.3/sq mi (617.48/km^{2})
- Time zone: UTC-5 (EST)
  - Summer (DST): UTC-4 (EDT)
- ZIP code: 46176
- Area code: 317
- FIPS code: 18-69318
- GNIS feature ID: 2395864
- Interstate Highways: I-74
- U.S. Highways: US 421
- Major State Roads: SR 9; SR 44
- Waterways: Little Blue River, Big Blue River
- Airports: Shelbyville Municipal Airport
- Website: www.shelbyville.in.gov

Shelbyville is a city in Addison Township, Shelby County, in the U.S. state of Indiana and is the county seat. The population was 20,067 as of the 2020 census.

== History ==
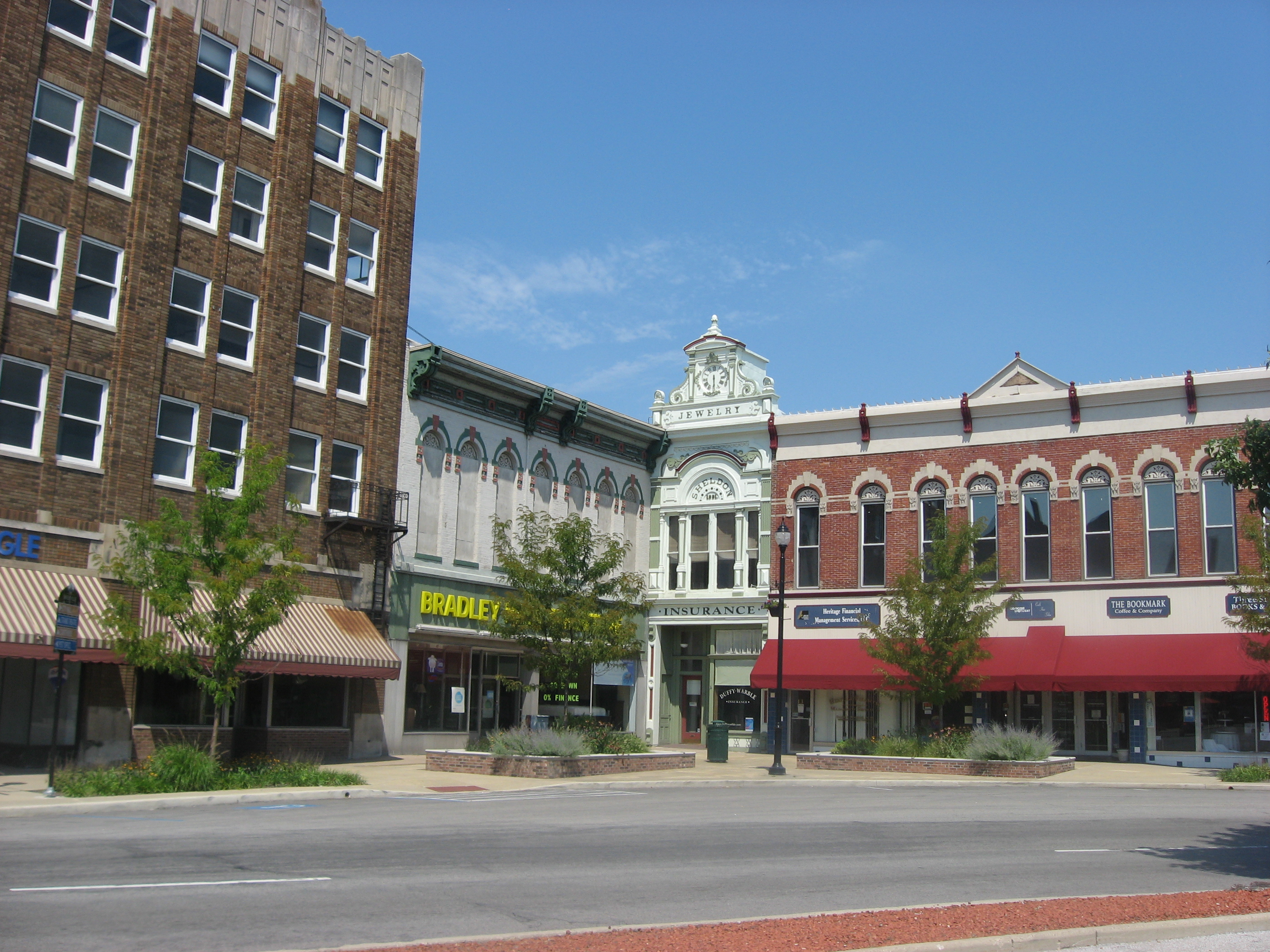
Shelbyville Commercial Historic District dating back to 1886

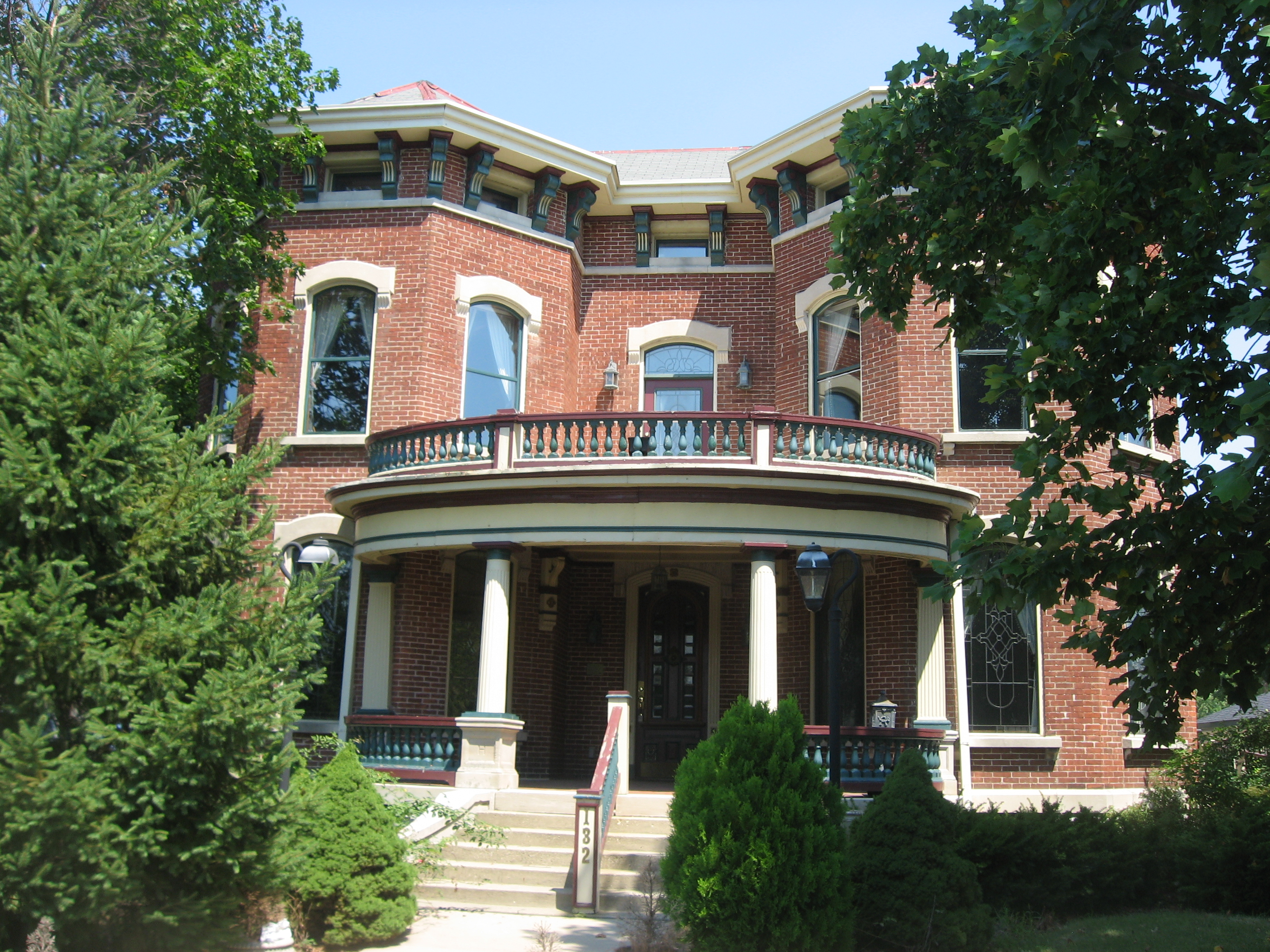
John Hamilton House built 1853

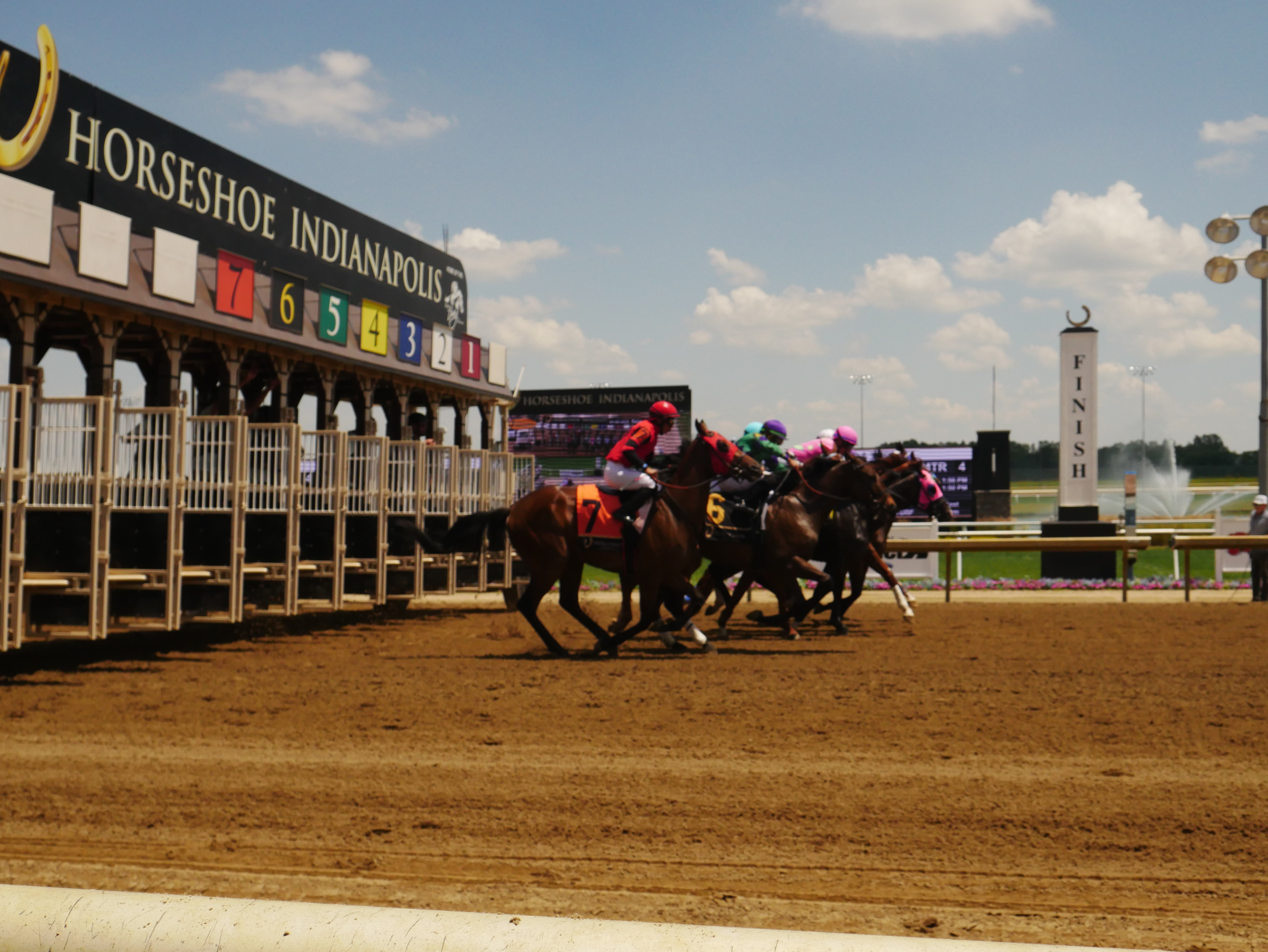
Horseshoe Indianapolis

In 1818, the land that would become Shelbyville was ceded to the United States by the Miami tribe in the Treaty of St. Mary's. Also in 1818, the backwoodsman Jacob Whetzel and a party cut a trail through this "New Purchase" from the Whitewater River at Laurel due west to the White River at Waverly. This trail became known as Whetzel's Trace and was the first east–west road into the New Purchase of central Indiana. Whetzel's Trace was cut just four miles (6.4 km) north of the site of Shelbyville and proved important in the settlement of Shelby County.

Shelbyville was platted in 1822. Shelbyville was named in honor of Isaac Shelby, the first and fifth Governor of Kentucky and soldier in Lord Dunmore's War, the Revolutionary War, and the War of 1812. The town incorporated January 21, 1850.

The Shelbyville post office has been in operation since 1823.

The city charter received at that time was destroyed in the City Hall fire on January 1, 1928.

A railroad was built connecting Shelbyville to Indianapolis in the late 1830s, the first railroad in the state; it was later expanded to connect to Madison and Jeffersonville.

Allegheny Airlines Flight 853 crashed on September 9, 1969, near Fairland. Nearly 30 of the 83 people killed were never identified and were buried in a mass grave in Shelbyville.

John Hamilton House, Lora B. Pearson School, Porter Pool Bathhouse, Shelbyville Commercial Historic District, Shelby County Courthouse, Shelbyville High School, and West Side Historic District are listed on the National Register of Historic Places. The Grover Museum features a "Streets of Old Shelby" exhibit.

Horseshoe Indianapolis (owned by Caesars Entertainment) opened in 2009.

== Geography ==
Shelbyville is located in Central Indiana and within the Indianapolis metropolitan area. It is 26 miles (42 km) southeast of Downtown Indianapolis. The city is at the fork of the Little Blue and Big Blue Rivers.

According to the 2010 census, Shelbyville has a total area of 11.845 square miles (30.68 km^{2}), of which 11.56 square miles (29.94 km^{2}) (or 97.59%) is land and 0.285 square miles (0.74 km^{2}) (or 2.41%) is water.

Walkerville (39°31′40″N 85°45′47″W) is an unincorporated community within the city limits.

=== Climate ===
Shelbyville has a humid continental climate (Köppen climate classification Dfa) experiencing four distinct seasons.

Climate data for Shelbyville, Indiana, 1991–2020 normals, extremes 1893–present
Month	Jan	Feb	Mar	Apr	May	Jun	Jul	Aug	Sep	Oct	Nov	Dec	Year
Record high °F (°C)	74 (23)	77 (25)	87 (31)	93 (34)	98 (37)	102 (39)	108 (42)	103 (39)	102 (39)	92 (33)	82 (28)	82 (28)	108 (42)
Mean maximum °F (°C)	59.2 (15.1)	63.5 (17.5)	73.5 (23.1)	80.7 (27.1)	87.0 (30.6)	91.9 (33.3)	92.3 (33.5)	92.2 (33.4)	90.8 (32.7)	83.2 (28.4)	70.8 (21.6)	61.6 (16.4)	94.6 (34.8)
Mean daily maximum °F (°C)	36.2 (2.3)	40.4 (4.7)	51.2 (10.7)	63.7 (17.6)	73.5 (23.1)	82.0 (27.8)	84.8 (29.3)	83.8 (28.8)	78.7 (25.9)	66.4 (19.1)	52.4 (11.3)	40.7 (4.8)	62.8 (17.1)
Daily mean °F (°C)	28.0 (−2.2)	31.4 (−0.3)	41.1 (5.1)	52.6 (11.4)	63.1 (17.3)	71.7 (22.1)	74.4 (23.6)	72.9 (22.7)	66.7 (19.3)	54.9 (12.7)	42.9 (6.1)	32.9 (0.5)	52.7 (11.5)
Mean daily minimum °F (°C)	19.8 (−6.8)	22.4 (−5.3)	30.9 (−0.6)	41.4 (5.2)	52.7 (11.5)	61.4 (16.3)	64.0 (17.8)	61.9 (16.6)	54.7 (12.6)	43.4 (6.3)	33.3 (0.7)	25.2 (−3.8)	42.6 (5.9)
Mean minimum °F (°C)	−0.8 (−18.2)	4.5 (−15.3)	14.9 (−9.5)	27.0 (−2.8)	37.5 (3.1)	48.9 (9.4)	53.6 (12.0)	51.6 (10.9)	41.4 (5.2)	29.2 (−1.6)	19.5 (−6.9)	7.5 (−13.6)	−3.9 (−19.9)
Record low °F (°C)	−25 (−32)	−20 (−29)	−5 (−21)	12 (−11)	25 (−4)	36 (2)	38 (3)	36 (2)	28 (−2)	15 (−9)	−4 (−20)	−24 (−31)	−25 (−32)
Average precipitation inches (mm)	3.32 (84)	2.68 (68)	3.30 (84)	4.68 (119)	4.70 (119)	4.86 (123)	4.16 (106)	3.20 (81)	3.17 (81)	3.13 (80)	3.44 (87)	3.39 (86)	44.03 (1,118)
Average snowfall inches (cm)	5.3 (13)	3.8 (9.7)	1.8 (4.6)	0.0 (0.0)	0.0 (0.0)	0.0 (0.0)	0.0 (0.0)	0.0 (0.0)	0.0 (0.0)	0.0 (0.0)	0.1 (0.25)	3.6 (9.1)	14.6 (36.65)
Average precipitation days (≥ 0.01 in)	10.7	9.0	10.5	11.9	12.2	11.4	9.6	8.1	7.6	8.0	9.1	10.8	118.9
Average snowy days (≥ 0.1 in)	2.6	1.9	0.8	0.1	0.0	0.0	0.0	0.0	0.0	0.0	0.2	1.3	6.9
Source 1: NOAA
Source 2: National Weather Service

== Demographics ==
Historical population
Census	Pop.	Note	%±
1840	446		—
1850	995		123.1%
1860	1,960		97.0%
1870	2,731		39.3%
1880	3,745		37.1%
1890	5,451		45.6%
1900	7,169		31.5%
1910	9,500		32.5%
1920	9,701		2.1%
1930	10,618		9.5%
1940	10,791		1.6%
1950	11,734		8.7%
1960	14,317		22.0%
1970	15,094		5.4%
1980	14,989		−0.7%
1990	15,336		2.3%
2000	17,951		17.1%
2010	19,191		6.9%
2020	20,067		4.6%
Source: US Census Bureau

=== 2020 census ===
As of the 2020 census, Shelbyville had a population of 20,067. The median age was 37.5 years. 23.9% of residents were under the age of 18 and 16.0% of residents were 65 years of age or older. For every 100 females there were 96.0 males, and for every 100 females age 18 and over there were 92.8 males age 18 and over.

99.3% of residents lived in urban areas, while 0.7% lived in rural areas.

There were 8,122 households in Shelbyville, of which 30.5% had children under the age of 18 living in them. Of all households, 40.1% were married-couple households, 20.5% were households with a male householder and no spouse or partner present, and 29.5% were households with a female householder and no spouse or partner present. About 32.2% of all households were made up of individuals and 13.7% had someone living alone who was 65 years of age or older.

There were 8,948 housing units, of which 9.2% were vacant. The homeowner vacancy rate was 1.9% and the rental vacancy rate was 9.1%.

Racial composition as of the 2020 census
Race	Number	Percent
White	17,110	85.3%
Black or African American	439	2.2%
American Indian and Alaska Native	91	0.5%
Asian	271	1.4%
Native Hawaiian and Other Pacific Islander	2	0.0%
Some other race	1,056	5.3%
Two or more races	1,098	5.5%
Hispanic or Latino (of any race)	1,869	9.3%

=== 2010 census ===
As of the census of 2010, there were 19,191 people, 7,682 households, and 4,848 families living in the city. The population density was 1,660.1 inhabitants per square mile (641.0/km^{2}). There were 8,658 housing units at an average density of 749.0 per square mile (289.2/km^{2}). The racial makeup of the city was 91.9% White, 1.9% African American, 0.2% Native American, 1.0% Asian, 3.2% from other races, and 1.7% from two or more races. Hispanic or Latino of any race were 7.1% of the population.

There were 7,682 households, of which 34.3% had children under the age of 18 living with them, 42.6% were married couples living together, 13.6% had a female householder with no husband present, 6.9% had a male householder with no wife present, and 36.9% were non-families. 30.7% of all households were made up of individuals, and 12.1% had someone living alone who was 65 years of age or older. The average household size was 2.43 and the average family size was 3.00.

The median age in the city was 35.9 years. 25.5% of residents were under the age of 18; 9.4% were between the ages of 18 and 24; 27.2% were from 25 to 44; 24.8% were from 45 to 64; and 13% were 65 years of age or older. The gender makeup of the city was 48.8% male and 51.2% female.

=== 2000 census ===
As of the census of 2000, there were 17,951 people, 7,307 households, and 4,654 families living in the city. The population density was 2,023.0 inhabitants per square mile (781.1/km^{2}). There were 7,930 housing units at an average density of 893.7 per square mile (345.1/km^{2}). The racial makeup of the city was 95.28% White, 1.58% African American, 0.15% Native American, 1.16% Asian, 0.02% Pacific Islander, 0.90% from other races, and 0.91% from two or more races. Hispanic or Latino of any race were 1.91% of the population.

There were 7,307 households, out of which 32.3% had children under the age of 18 living with them, 46.3% were married couples living together, 12.5% had a female householder with no husband present, and 36.3% were non-families. 30.3% of all households were made up of individuals, and 12.2% had someone living alone who was 65 years of age or older. The average household size was 2.39 and the average family size was 2.96. In the city, the population was spread out, with 26.2% under the age of 18, 9.5% from 18 to 24, 31.6% from 25 to 44, 19.3% from 45 to 64, and 13.3% who were 65 years of age or older. The median age was 34 years. For every 100 females, there were 94.8 males. For every 100 females age 18 and over, there were 92.4 males.

The median income for a household in the city was $36,824, and the median income for a family was $46,379. Males had a median income of $34,550 versus $24,331 for females. The per capita income for the city was $18,670. About 6.1% of families and 9.1% of the population were below the poverty line, including 10.8% of those under age 18 and 11.6% of those age 65 or over.

== Arts and culture ==
Shelbyville has a public library. It is one of three branches of the Shelby County Public Library system.

== Education ==
Shelbyville Central Schools consists of Shelbyville Senior High School, Shelbyville Middle School, and three lower grades / elementary schools in neighborhoods: Coulston Elementary, Loper Elementary, and Hendricks Elementary.

St Joseph Elementary School is a private / parochial school, associated with the St Joseph Roman Catholic Church.

Until 1870 (five years after the American Civil War and midway into the Reconstruction era for the emancipated Southern slaves, now called freedmen), no public education was provided for Shelbyville's black residents. In that year, the state of Indiana required communities to provide free public education for all children, similar to that already available in most Eastern states since the 1840s, but allowed the various towns and counties to choose whether they would be racially integrated as in the North, or segregated as in the South where the enactment of a series of discrimination laws marked the start of the "Jim Crow" era from the 1880s. In the Midwest region town of Shelbyville, schools were racially integrated at the high school level but segregated in the lower elementary grades until 1949, five years before the landmark unanimous decision of the United States Supreme Court in Brown v. Board of Education in May 1954 to outlaw legal segregation.

== Notable people ==
- Sandy Allen (1955–2008), world's tallest living female (7 feet 7 inches (2.31 m))
- Bucky Barnes, a fictional character from the Marvel Comics universe, was born in Shelbyville.
- Ovid Butler (1801–1881), an abolitionist, chancellor, and namesake of Butler University, practiced law in Shelbyville from 1825 to 1836.
- William Garrett (1929–1974), Indiana Mr. Basketball, led Shelbyville HS basketball team to state high school basketball championship in 1947.
- Ken Gunning (1914–1991), basketball player for Indiana Hoosiers and head coach at Wichita State University
- Thomas A. Hendricks (1819–1885), 21st Vice President of the United States under Grover Cleveland in 1885
- Victor Higgins (1884–1949), painter
- John W. Hill (1890–1977), founder of PR firm Hill & Knowlton in Cleveland in 1927
- Marjorie Main (1890–1975), actress
- Charles Major (1856–1913), novelist
- Edna Parker (1893–2008), oldest living person at the time of her death at age 115
- Mike Phipps (born 1947), NFL quarterback for the Cleveland Browns and Chicago Bears.
- James Pierce (1900–1983), silent film actor
- Kid Quill (born 1994), recording artist
- Mike Sexton (1947–2020), professional poker player and commentator; inducted into the Poker Hall of Fame in 2009
- Waldo E. Sexton (1885–1967), entrepreneur
- Wilbur Shaw (1902–1954), three-time Indianapolis 500 winner in 1937, 1939, and 1940
- W. Roland Stine (1940–2003), educator and politician
- Bob Zimny (1921–2011), NFL football player for the Chicago Cardinals; won the 1947 NFL Championship
