= National Register of Historic Places listings in Wayne County, Indiana =

Location of Wayne County in Indiana

This is a list of the National Register of Historic Places listings in Wayne County, Indiana.

This is intended to be a complete list of the properties and districts on the National Register of Historic Places in Wayne County, Indiana, United States. Latitude and longitude coordinates are provided for many National Register properties and districts; these locations may be seen together in a map.

There are 39 properties and districts listed on the National Register in the county, including one National Historic Landmark. Another two properties were once listed but have been removed.

Properties and districts located in incorporated areas display the name of the municipality, while properties and districts in unincorporated areas display the name of their civil township. Properties and districts split between multiple jurisdictions display the names of all jurisdictions.

This National Park Service list is complete through NPS recent listings posted February 20, 2026.

== Current listings ==
	Name on the Register	Image	Date listed	Location	City or town	Description
1	Beechwood (Isaac Kinsey House)	Beechwood (Isaac Kinsey House)	February 21, 1975 (#75000031)	2 miles south of Milton on Sarver Rd. 39°45′15″N 85°09′04″W	Washington Township	
2	Bethel A.M.E. Church	Bethel A.M.E. Church	September 5, 1975 (#75000032)	200 S. 6th St. 39°49′33″N 84°53′41″W	Richmond	
3	Mary Birdsall House	Mary Birdsall House	September 23, 1999 (#99001155)	504 NW. 5th St. 39°50′05″N 84°54′31″W	Richmond	
4	Cambridge City Historic District	Cambridge City Historic District	June 14, 1991 (#91000787)	Roughly bounded by Boundary, Maple, High, and 4th Sts. 39°48′41″N 85°10′16″W	Cambridge City	
5	Centerville Historic District	Centerville Historic District	October 26, 1971 (#71000008)	Bounded by the corporation limits, 3rd and South Sts., and Willow Grove Rd. 39°49′09″N 84°59′47″W	Centerville	
6	Levi Coffin House	Levi Coffin House	October 15, 1966 (#66000009)	115 N. Main St. 39°57′23″N 84°55′02″W	Fountain City	
7	Conklin-Montgomery House	Conklin-Montgomery House	February 24, 1975 (#75000033)	302 E. Main St. 39°48′45″N 85°09′52″W	Cambridge City	
8	David Worth Dennis House	David Worth Dennis House	April 25, 2001 (#01000404)	610 W. Main St. 39°49′45″N 84°54′36″W	Richmond	
9	Doddridge Chapel and Cemetery	Doddridge Chapel and Cemetery	September 28, 2003 (#03000984)	9471 Chapel Rd., southwest of Centerville; 39°45′04″N 85°03′21″W	Washington Township	
10	Dublin Friends Meeting House		September 4, 2018 (#100002868)	2352 W. Maple St. 39°48′40″N 85°12′35″W	Dublin	
11	Earlham College Observatory	Earlham College Observatory	October 21, 1975 (#75000034)	National Rd. on the Earlham College campus 39°49′28″N 84°54′51″W	Richmond	
12	East Main Street-Glen Miller Park Historic District	East Main Street-Glen Miller Park Historic District	March 27, 1986 (#86000612)	Both sides of E. Main St. from N. 18th to N. 30th Sts. and Glen Miller Park east of 30th St. 39°49′58″N 84°52′04″W	Richmond	
13	Eliason Farm		May 31, 2019 (#100004048)	1594 N. Eliason Rd. 39°50′55″N 84°58′22″W	Centerville vicinity	
14	Forest Hills Country Club	Forest Hills Country Club	December 15, 2015 (#15000892)	2169 S. 23rd St. 39°48′15″N 84°52′11″W	Wayne Township	
15	Fountain City Historic District		September 4, 2018 (#100002869)	Roughly bounded by Noland's Fork and North, Hartley, and Vine Sts. 39°57′19″N 84°55′08″W	Fountain City	
16	Abram Gaar House and Farm	Abram Gaar House and Farm	February 20, 1975 (#75000035)	2411 Pleasant View Rd., northeast of Richmond; 39°50′57″N 84°52′00″W	Wayne Township	
17	Oliver P. and Mary Alice Gaar House	Oliver P. and Mary Alice Gaar House	March 7, 2017 (#100000717)	1307 E. Main St. 39°49′45″N 84°53′03″W	Richmond	
18	Henry and Alice Gennett House	Henry and Alice Gennett House	August 11, 1983 (#83000043)	1829 E. Main St. 39°49′47″N 84°52′37″W	Richmond	
19	Hagerstown I.O.O.F. Hall	Hagerstown I.O.O.F. Hall	January 3, 1978 (#78000041)	Main and Perry Sts. 39°54′40″N 85°09′37″W	Hagerstown	
20	Hicksite Friends Meetinghouse (Wayne County Museum)	Hicksite Friends Meetinghouse (Wayne County Museum)	October 14, 1975 (#75000036)	1150 N. A St. 39°49′51″N 84°53′13″W	Richmond	
21	The Huddleston House Tavern	The Huddleston House Tavern	June 15, 1975 (#75000037)	E. U.S. Route 40; 39°48′41″N 85°11′03″W	Mount Auburn	
22	Lewis Jones House	Lewis Jones House	June 7, 1984 (#84001744)	5224 College Corner Rd., northeast of Centerville; 39°49′52″N 84°58′33″W	Center Township	
23	King-Dennis Farm	King-Dennis Farm	June 15, 2000 (#00000677)	2939 King Rd., north of Centerville; 39°52′10″N 84°58′34″W	Center Township	
24	Lackey-Overbeck House	Lackey-Overbeck House	May 28, 1976 (#76000030)	520 E. Church St. 39°48′42″N 85°09′42″W	Cambridge City	
25	Leland Hotel	Leland Hotel	February 28, 1985 (#85000362)	900 S. A St. 39°49′39″N 84°53′24″W	Richmond	
26	Oliver P. Morton House	Oliver P. Morton House	October 10, 1975 (#75000038)	319 W. Main St. 39°49′02″N 85°00′02″W	Centerville	
27	Murray Theater	Murray Theater	March 25, 1982 (#82000053)	1003 Main St. 39°49′44″N 84°53′19″W	Richmond	
28	Old Richmond Historic District	Old Richmond Historic District	June 28, 1974 (#74000025)	Roughly bounded by the former C&O railroad line, S. 11th, S. A, and the alley south of South E St.; also roughly bounded by A, 11th, and E Sts., and the former C&O railroad tracks 39°49′21″N 84°53′32″W	Richmond	Second set of boundaries represents an increase and decrease of boundaries
29	Reeveston Place Historic District	Reeveston Place Historic District	January 17, 2003 (#02001171)	Bounded by S. B, S. E, S. 16th, and S. 23rd Sts. 39°49′26″N 84°52′32″W	Richmond	
30	Richmond Downtown Historic District	Richmond Downtown Historic District	December 19, 2011 (#11000918)	Roughly Main St. between 7th and 10th Sts. and N. 8th St. between Main and A Sts. 39°49′44″N 84°53′30″W	Richmond	
31	Richmond High School	Richmond High School	September 22, 2015 (#15000602)	380 Hub Etchison Parkway; 39°49′21″N 84°54′05″W	Richmond	
32	Richmond Railroad Station Historic District	Richmond Railroad Station Historic District	October 8, 1987 (#87001808)	Roughly bounded by the Norfolk Southern railroad tracks, N. 10th St., Elm Pl., N. D St., and Ft. Wayne Ave. 39°50′03″N 84°53′26″W	Richmond	
33	Andrew F. Scott House	Andrew F. Scott House	October 10, 1975 (#75000039)	126 N. 10th St. 39°49′53″N 84°53′22″W	Richmond	
34	Samuel G. Smith Farm	Samuel G. Smith Farm	January 14, 1983 (#83000044)	West of Richmond at 3431 Crowe Rd. 39°50′23″N 84°56′51″W	Center Township	
35	Starr Historic District	Starr Historic District	June 28, 1974 (#74000026)	Roughly bounded by N. 16th, E and A Sts., and the alley west of N. 10th St. 39°49′57″N 84°53′05″W	Richmond	
36	John & Caroline Stonebraker House	John & Caroline Stonebraker House	December 16, 2014 (#14001040)	100 S. Washington St. 39°54′35″N 85°09′45″W	Hagerstown	
37	Wayne County Courthouse	Wayne County Courthouse	December 8, 1978 (#78000042)	Bounded by 3rd, 4th, Main, and S. A Sts. 39°49′42″N 84°53′50″W	Richmond	
38	Westcott Stock Farm	Westcott Stock Farm	December 17, 1998 (#98001522)	306 E. North St. 39°49′18″N 84°59′37″W	Centerville	
39	Witt-Champe-Myers House	Witt-Champe-Myers House	June 9, 1995 (#95000700)	Southeastern corner of the junction of Spring and Foundry Sts. 39°48′38″N 85°12′07″W	Dublin	

== Former listings ==
	Name on the Register	Image	Date listed	Date removed	Location	City or town	Description
1	Richmond Gas Company Building	Richmond Gas Company Building	August 25, 1981 (#81000023)	June 15, 2012	100 E. Main St. 39°49′47″N 84°53′58″W	Richmond	
2	Starr Piano Company Warehouse and Administration Building	Starr Piano Company Warehouse and Administration Building	June 18, 1981 (#81000024)	May 1, 1995	300 S. 1st St. 39°49′29″N 84°54′00″W	Richmond	

== See also ==
- List of National Historic Landmarks in Indiana
- National Register of Historic Places listings in Indiana
- Listings in neighboring counties: Darke (OH), Fayette, Henry, Preble (OH), Randolph, Union
- List of Indiana state historical markers in Wayne County
