= List of Indiana state historical markers in Wayne County =

Location of Wayne County in Indiana

This is a list of the Indiana state historical markers in Wayne County.

This is intended to be a complete list of the official state historical markers placed in Wayne County, Indiana, United States by the Indiana Historical Bureau. The locations of the historical markers and their latitude and longitude coordinates are included below when available, along with their names, years of placement, and topics as recorded by the Historical Bureau. There are 13 historical markers located in Wayne County.

== Historical markers ==
Marker title	Image	Year placed	Location	Topics
Oliver P. Morton Home		1962	Junction of W. Main Street (U.S. Route 40) and Willow Grove Road in Centerville; 39°49′2″N 85°0′2.7″W	Military, Politics
Iron Brigade Commander		1963	Junction of W. Main Street (U.S. Route 40) and S. Gay Street in Cambridge City; 39°48′46″N 85°9′46.2″W	Military
East Germantown Civil War Band		1978	Junction of Old National Road (U.S. Route 40) and Milton Street; 39°48′47.4″N 85°8′11″W	[None]
Overbeck House and Studio		1992	Junction of E. Main Street (U.S. Route 40) and S. Pearl Street in Cambridge City; 39°48′42.6″N 85°9′42.6″W	Arts and Culture, Women
Cambridge City		1992	Junction of E. Main Street (U.S. Route 40) and Foote Street in Cambridge City; 39°48′44.6″N 85°10′17.4″W	Historic District, Neighborhoods, and Towns, Transportation
Levi Coffin		2002	113 N. U.S. Route 27 in Fountain City; 39°57′22″N 84°55′3″W	Underground Railroad, African American
Indiana's First Woman's Rights Convention		2003	2224 Cumberland Road (U.S. Route 40) in Dublin; 39°48′43.4″N 85°12′28″W	Women, Politics
George Washington Julian		2013	320 E. Main St., Centerville; 39°49′4.1″N 85°59′30.8″W	Politics
Virginia Claypool Meredith		2014	512 E. Main St. (U.S. 40), Cambridge City; 39°48′46″N 85°09′44.2″W	Women's Suffrage, Business, Labor & Industry
Wayne County Seminary		2018	201 W. Main St. / US 40, at Spruce and Main St., Centerville; 39°49′3.5″N 84°59′53.2″W	Education & Library
Bishop William Paul Quinn		2018	200 6th St., Richmond; 39°49′33.1″N 84°53′40.3″W	Religion; African American
Indiana University East		2019	2325 Chester Boulevard, Richmond; 39°52′09″N 84°52′57.7″W	Education & Library
Dr. Mary F. Thomas, 1816-1888		2023	Main St. and SW 1st St., Richmond; 39°49′44″N 84°54′09″W	Women; Science, Medicine & Invention

== See also ==
- List of Indiana state historical markers
- National Register of Historic Places listings in Wayne County, Indiana
