= Westcott House =

Westcott House may refer to:

- Westcott House (Springfield, Ohio), designed by Frank Lloyd Wright, NRHP-listed
- Westcott House, Cambridge, Anglican theological college in England
- William Westcott House, Orange Park, Florida, listed on the NRHP in Florida
- Nathan Westcott House, Cranston, Rhode Island, listed on the NRHP in Rhode Island

== See also ==
- Westcott Stock Farm, Centerville, Indiana, listed on the National Register of Historic Places in Wayne County, Indiana
