= Pennville =

Pennville can refer to a place:

In the United States

- Pennville, Indiana, in Jay County
- Pennville, Wayne County, Indiana
- Pennville, Georgia
- Pennville, Missouri
- Pennville, Pennsylvania

Elsewhere

- Pennville, Dominica
