= Louise Boyd =

Louise Boyd may refer to:

- Louise Arner Boyd (1887–1972), American explorer of Greenland and the Arctic
- Louise Esther Vickroy Boyd (1827–1909), American writer
