= Spencer Records =

Spencer Records (December 11, 1762 – February 17, 1850) was born in Sussex County, Delaware. He was an early pioneer of the American Midwest, who moved with his large family as a boy, in 1766, from the East Coast over the Appalachians into the area of Fort Pitt in Western Pennsylvania (now Pittsburgh). After staying there a few years, the family moved down the Ohio River into Kentucky, Indiana, and Illinois. His narrative of these travels, which he wrote in 1842 at the age of 80, is a first-hand account of the early settlement of the Midwest. He served in the Pennsylvania militia during the American Revolutionary War. He died in Mount Auburn, Indiana at the age of 87.
