= East Germantown, Indiana =

- Town
- Location of East Germantown in Wayne County, Indiana.
- Coordinates: 39°48′47″N 85°08′13″W
- Country: United States
- State: Indiana
- County: Wayne
- Township: Jackson

Area
  - Total: 0.12 sq mi (0.30 km^{2})
  - Land: 0.12 sq mi (0.30 km^{2})
  - Water: 0 sq mi (0.00 km^{2})
- Elevation: 951 ft (290 m)

Population (2020)
  - Total: 261
  - Density: 2,236.8/sq mi (863.62/km^{2})
- Time zone: UTC-5 (Eastern (EST))
  - Summer (DST): UTC-5 (EST)
- ZIP code: 47327
- Area code: 765
- FIPS code: 18-19756
- GNIS feature ID: 2396917
- Website: www.germantown-pershing.com

East Germantown is a town in Jackson Township, Wayne County, in the U.S. state of Indiana. The population was 261 at the 2020 census.

== History ==
East Germantown was originally called Georgetown, and under the latter name was laid out and platted in 1827.

The East Germantown Civil War Band was assigned to the 12th Indiana Volunteer Infantry Regiment in 1862.

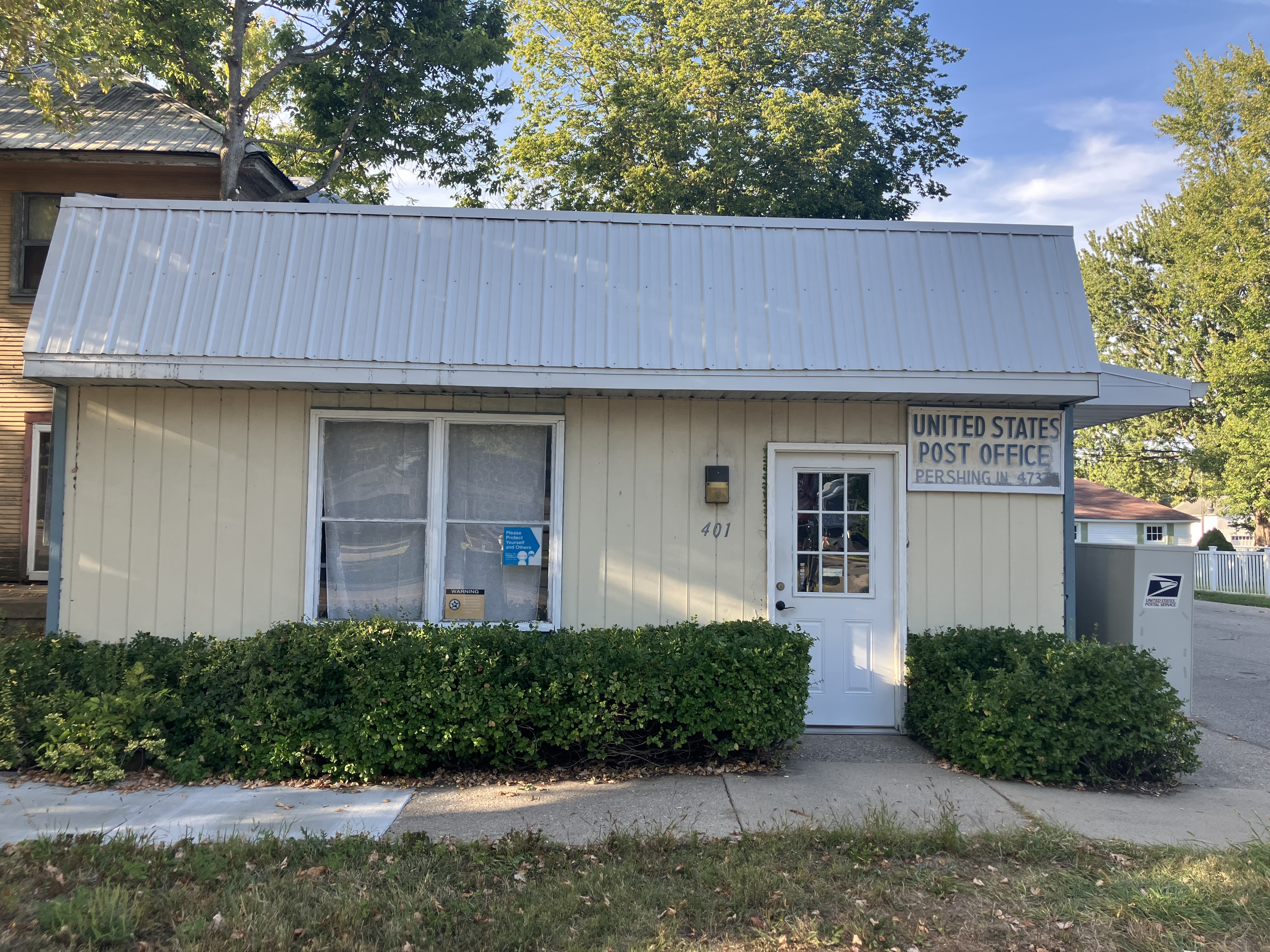
Post office for East Germantown, Indiana, also known as Pershing. Located on U.S. Highway 40.

A post office operated from March 31, 1846, until August 4, 1917, under the name of East Germantown, when its name officially changed to Pershing due to events surrounding World War I.

A resolution to change the town name from East Germantown to Pershing, in honor of General Pershing, was introduced by the town board. A faction campaigned the day before the name-change vote by telling people that since their deeds mentioned "East Germantown", changing to "Pershing" would invalidate their ownership. Ernest G. Lamott (1911–1980), secretary-treasurer of the town board at the time, said the vote went for "East Germantown" since voters had no way of proving or disproving this assertion in the hours before the election.

The postmaster in 1917, Frank Sipe, succeeded in getting the post office name changed to "Pershing". However, the railroad continued with the name East Germantown since there is another Pershing, an unincorporated community, in Fulton County.

The local Pershing Elementary School at 519 Queen Street is now the administrative offices for the Western Wayne School Corporation.

== Geography ==
According to the 2010 census, East Germantown has a total area of 0.13 square miles (0.34 km^{2}), all land.

== Demographics ==
Historical population
Census	Pop.	Note	%±
1860	465		—
1870	536		15.3%
1880	451		−15.9%
1890	338		−25.1%
1900	305		−9.8%
1910	302		−1.0%
1920	267		−11.6%
1930	291		9.0%
1940	305		4.8%
1950	389		27.5%
1960	367		−5.7%
1970	447		21.8%
1980	438		−2.0%
1990	372		−15.1%
2000	243		−34.7%
2010	410		68.7%
2020	261		−36.3%
U.S. Decennial Census

=== 2010 census ===
As of the census of 2010, there were 410 people, 155 households, and 121 families living in the town. The population density was 3,153.8 inhabitants per square mile (1,217.7/km^{2}). There were 174 housing units at an average density of 1,338.5 per square mile (516.8/km^{2}). The racial makeup of the town was 97.8% White, 0.2% African American, 0.2% Native American, 0.2% Asian, 0.7% from other races, and 0.7% from two or more races. Hispanic or Latino of any race were 0.7% of the population.

There were 155 households, of which 37.4% had children under the age of 18 living with them, 54.8% were married couples living together, 16.1% had a female householder with no husband present, 7.1% had a male householder with no wife present, and 21.9% were non-families. 16.8% of all households were made up of individuals, and 7.7% had someone living alone who was 65 years of age or older. The average household size was 2.65 and the average family size was 2.92.

The median age in the town was 39.4 years. 23.4% of residents were under the age of 18; 9.5% were between the ages of 18 and 24; 25.4% were from 25 to 44; 26.1% were from 45 to 64; and 15.6% were 65 years of age or older. The gender makeup of the town was 48.5% male and 51.5% female.

=== 2000 census ===
As of the census of 2000, there were 243 people, 95 households, and 72 families living in the town. The population density was 1,913.2 inhabitants per square mile (738.7/km^{2}). There were 103 housing units at an average density of 810.9 per square mile (313.1/km^{2}). The racial makeup of the town was 100.00% White. Hispanic or Latino of any race were 0.82% of the population.

There were 95 households, out of which 37.9% had children under the age of 18 living with them, 61.1% were married couples living together, 9.5% had a female householder with no husband present, and 23.2% were non-families. 23.2% of all households were made up of individuals, and 12.6% had someone living alone who was 65 years of age or older. The average household size was 2.56 and the average family size was 2.95.

In the town, the population was spread out, with 28.4% under the age of 18, 4.1% from 18 to 24, 29.2% from 25 to 44, 26.7% from 45 to 64, and 11.5% who were 65 years of age or older. The median age was 38 years. For every 100 females, there were 94.4 males. For every 100 females age 18 and over, there were 93.3 males.

The median income for a household in the town was $30,714, and the median income for a family was $35,000. Males had a median income of $31,250 versus $19,063 for females. The per capita income for the town was $12,827. About 15.0% of families and 15.3% of the population were below the poverty line, including 15.0% of those under the age of eighteen and 37.5% of those 65 or over.
