= Mount Auburn, Indiana =

- Town
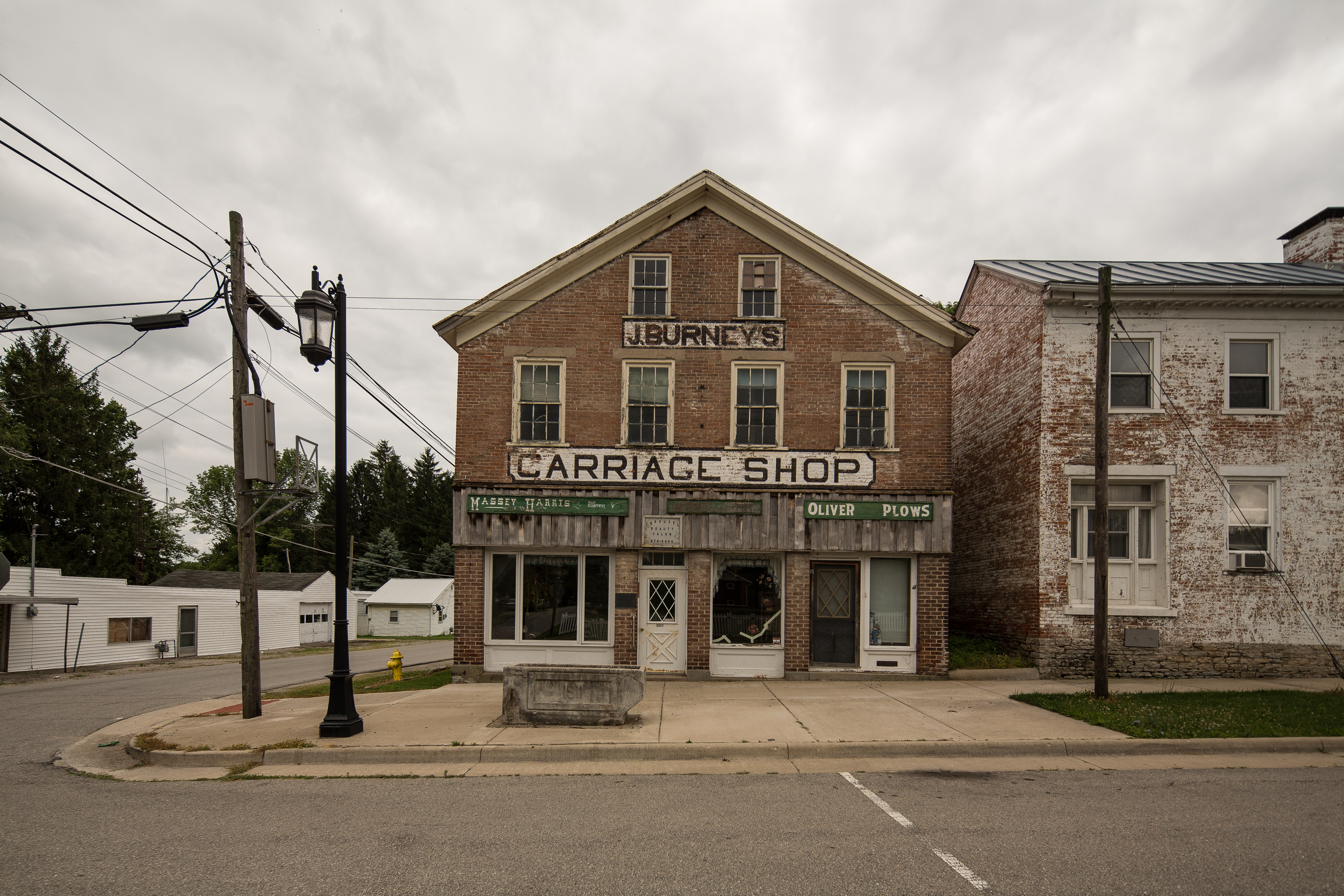

- Location of Mount Auburn in Wayne County, Indiana.
- Coordinates: 39°48′44″N 85°11′26″W
- Country: United States
- State: Indiana
- County: Wayne
- Township: Jackson

Area
  - Total: 0.20 sq mi (0.53 km^{2})
  - Land: 0.19 sq mi (0.49 km^{2})
  - Water: 0.015 sq mi (0.04 km^{2})
- Elevation: 994 ft (303 m)

Population (2020)
  - Total: 129
  - Density: 679/sq mi (262.1/km^{2})
- Time zone: UTC-5 (Eastern (EST))
  - Summer (DST): UTC-4 (EDT)
- ZIP code: 47327
- Area code: 765
- FIPS code: 18-51318
- GNIS feature ID: 2396786

Mount Auburn is a town in Jackson Township, Wayne County, in the U.S. state of Indiana. The population was 129 at the 2020 census. The town is sandwiched between Dublin and Cambridge City.

== Geography ==
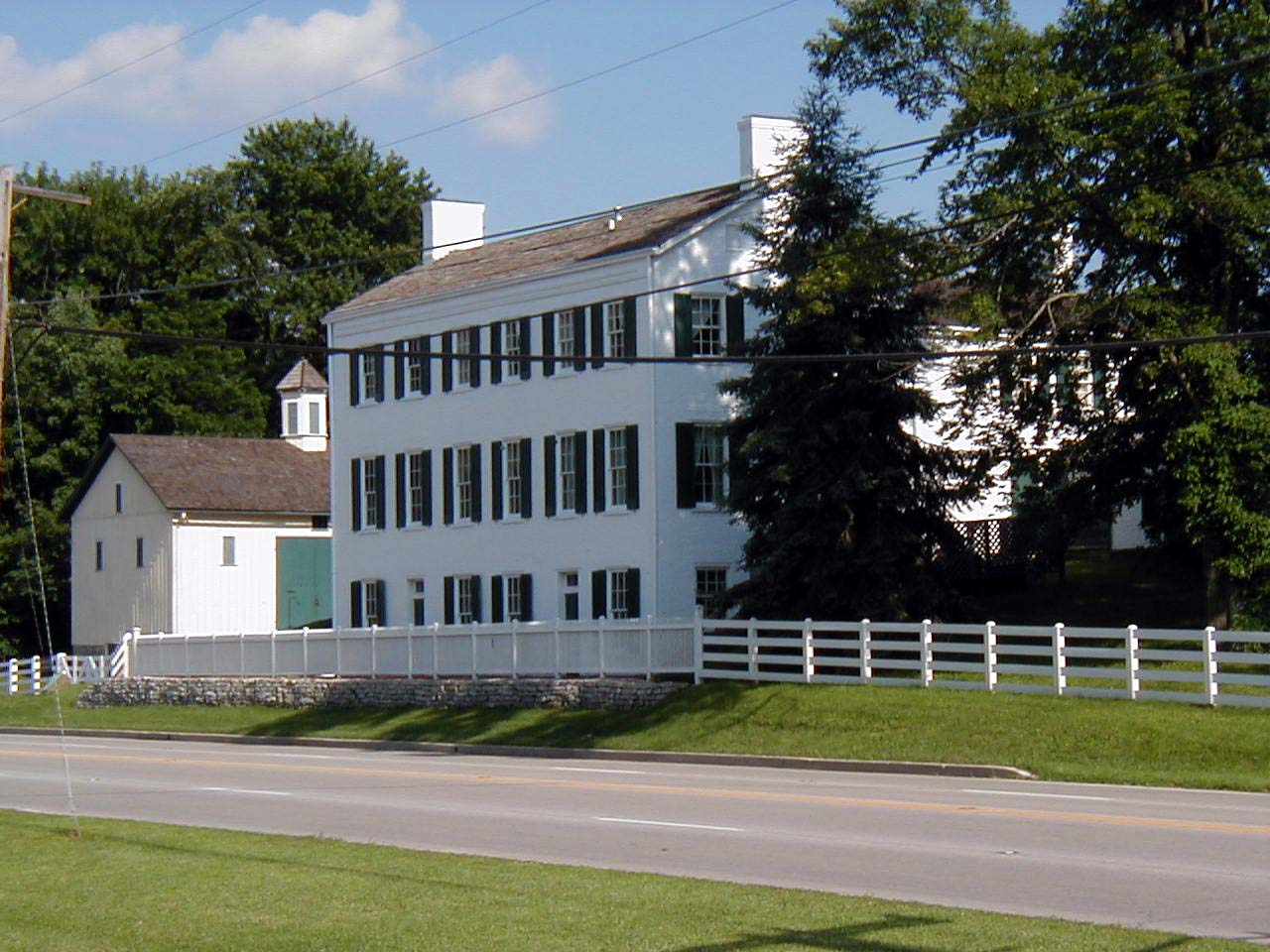
The Huddleston Farmhouse in Mount Auburn is listed on the National Register of Historic Places listings

According to the 2010 census, Mount Auburn has a total area of 0.23 square miles (0.60 km^{2}), of which 0.21 square miles (0.54 km^{2}) (or 91.3%) is land and 0.02 square miles (0.05 km^{2}) (or 8.7%) is water.

== Demographics ==
Historical population
Census	Pop.	Note	%±
1880	171		—
1890	144		−15.8%
1900	163		13.2%
1910	167		2.5%
1920	142		−15.0%
1930	161		13.4%
1940	145		−9.9%
1950	164		13.1%
1960	144		−12.2%
1970	157		9.0%
1980	192		22.3%
1990	138		−28.1%
2000	75		−45.7%
2010	117		56.0%
2020	129		10.3%
U.S. Decennial Census

=== 2010 census ===
As of the census of 2010, there were 117 people, 49 households, and 31 families living in the town. The population density was 531.8 inhabitants per square mile (205.3/km^{2}). There were 55 housing units at an average density of 250.0 per square mile (96.5/km^{2}). The racial makeup of the town was 98.3% White, 0.9% Asian, and 0.9% from two or more races.

There were 49 households, of which 36.7% had children under the age of 18 living with them, 46.9% were married couples living together, 14.3% had a female householder with no husband present, 2.0% had a male householder with no wife present, and 36.7% were non-families. 32.7% of all households were made up of individuals, and 14.3% had someone living alone who was 65 years of age or older. The average household size was 2.39 and the average family size was 3.13.

The median age in the town was 37.5 years. 25.6% of residents were under the age of 18; 6.8% were between the ages of 18 and 24; 26.6% were from 25 to 44; 21.3% were from 45 to 64; and 19.7% were 65 years of age or older. The gender makeup of the town was 48.7% male and 51.3% female.

=== 2000 census ===
As of the census of 2000, there were 75 people, 31 households, and 23 families living in the town. The population density was 337.7 inhabitants per square mile (130.4/km^{2}). There were 34 housing units at an average density of 153.1 per square mile (59.1/km^{2}). The racial makeup of the town was 100.00% White.

There were 31 households, out of which 29.0% had children under the age of 18 living with them, 74.2% were married couples living together, 3.2% had a female householder with no husband present, and 22.6% were non-families. 19.4% of all households were made up of individuals, and 12.9% had someone living alone who was 65 years of age or older. The average household size was 2.42 and the average family size was 2.79.

In the town, the population was spread out, with 20.0% under the age of 18, 5.3% from 18 to 24, 32.0% from 25 to 44, 18.7% from 45 to 64, and 24.0% who were 65 years of age or older. The median age was 41 years. For every 100 females, there were 108.3 males. For every 100 females age 18 and over, there were 100.0 males.

The median income for a household in the town was $30,313, and the median income for a family was $31,667. Males had a median income of $37,500 versus $28,125 for females. The per capita income for the town was $17,624. There were no families and 3.2% of the population living below the poverty line, including no under eighteens and none of those over 64.
