= Milton, Indiana =

- Town
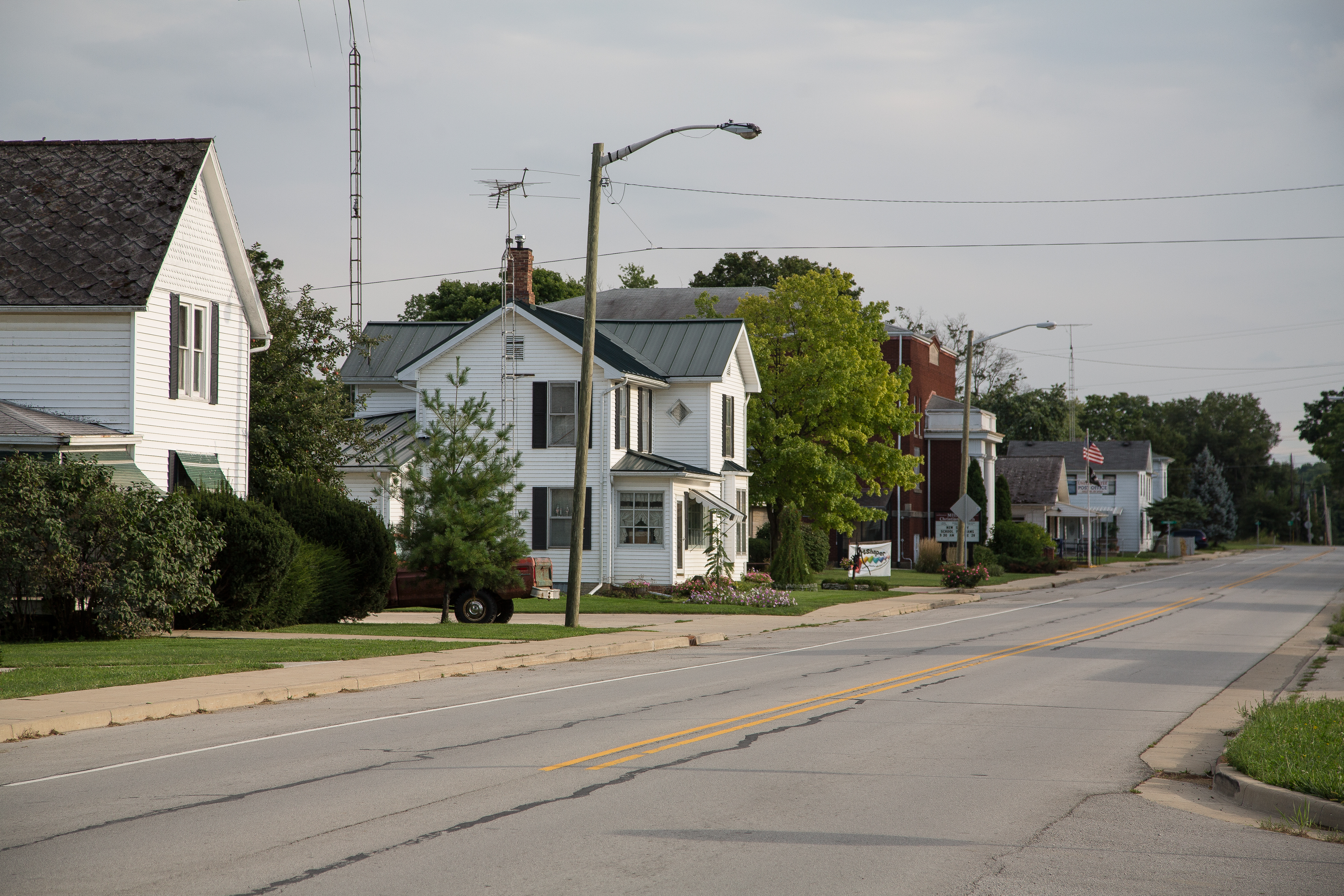

- Logo

- Location of Milton in Wayne County, Indiana.
- Coordinates: 39°47′10″N 85°09′23″W
- Country: United States
- State: Indiana
- County: Wayne
- Township: Washington
- Founded: 1824

Area
  - Total: 0.28 sq mi (0.73 km^{2})
  - Land: 0.28 sq mi (0.72 km^{2})
  - Water: 0.0039 sq mi (0.01 km^{2})
- Elevation: 935 ft (285 m)

Population (2020)
  - Total: 455
  - Density: 1,639.9/sq mi (633.15/km^{2})
- Time zone: UTC-5 (Eastern (EST))
  - Summer (DST): UTC-4 (EDT)
- ZIP code: 47357
- Area code: 765
- FIPS code: 18-49860
- GNIS feature ID: 2396767
- Website: townofmilton.in

Milton is a town in Washington Township, Wayne County, in the U.S. state of Indiana. The population was 455 at the 2020 census.

== History ==
Milton was laid out and platted in 1824. The community was named for the presence of several watermills in the area.

The Milton post office has been in operation since 1825. The Milton post office is currently open after repairs were made to the premises after an arson fire.

By 1826, Milton had a population of nearly 200.

== Geography ==
According to the 2010 census, Milton has a total area of 0.27 square miles (0.70 km^{2}), all land.

== Demographics ==
Historical population
Census	Pop.	Note	%±
1850	765		—
1870	823		—
1880	855		3.9%
1890	742		−13.2%
1900	682		−8.1%
1910	601		−11.9%
1920	580		−3.5%
1930	612		5.5%
1940	646		5.6%
1950	752		16.4%
1960	700		−6.9%
1970	694		−0.9%
1980	729		5.0%
1990	634		−13.0%
2000	611		−3.6%
2010	490		−19.8%
2020	455		−7.1%
U.S. Decennial Census

=== 2010 census ===
As of the census of 2010, there were 490 people, 197 households, and 136 families living in the town. The population density was 1,814.8 inhabitants per square mile (700.7/km^{2}). There were 227 housing units at an average density of 840.7 per square mile (324.6/km^{2}). The racial makeup of the town was 98.4% White, 0.2% African American, 1.2% Native American, and 0.2% from two or more races. Hispanic or Latino of any race were 0.8% of the population.

There were 197 households, of which 29.9% had children under the age of 18 living with them, 47.7% were married couples living together, 11.2% had a female householder with no husband present, 10.2% had a male householder with no wife present, and 31.0% were non-families. 24.9% of all households were made up of individuals, and 12.7% had someone living alone who was 65 years of age or older. The average household size was 2.49 and the average family size was 2.85.

The median age in the town was 40.2 years. 22% of residents were under the age of 18; 8.8% were between the ages of 18 and 24; 28.5% were from 25 to 44; 26.5% were from 45 to 64; and 14.1% were 65 years of age or older. The gender makeup of the town was 50.4% male and 49.6% female.

=== 2000 census ===
As of the census of 2000, there were 611 people, 235 households, and 173 families living in the town. The population density was 2,251.3 inhabitants per square mile (869.2/km^{2}). There were 244 housing units at an average density of 899.0 per square mile (347.1/km^{2}). The racial makeup of the town was 98.85% White, and 1.15% from two or more races. Hispanic or Latino of any race were 0.16% of the population.

There were 235 households, out of which 33.6% had children under the age of 18 living with them, 59.1% were married couples living together, 10.2% had a female householder with no husband present, and 26.0% were non-families. 23.4% of all households were made up of individuals, and 10.2% had someone living alone who was 65 years of age or older. The average household size was 2.60 and the average family size was 3.06.

In the town, the population was spread out, with 27.3% under the age of 18, 7.2% from 18 to 24, 31.9% from 25 to 44, 20.3% from 45 to 64, and 13.3% who were 65 years of age or older. The median age was 35 years. For every 100 females, there were 96.5 males. For every 100 females age 18 and over, there were 92.2 males.

The median income for a household in the town was $35,167, and the median income for a family was $36,635. Males had a median income of $30,250 versus $18,036 for females. The per capita income for the town was $15,131. About 10.2% of families and 11.3% of the population were below the poverty line, including 16.7% of those under age 18 and 7.8% of those age 65 or over.

== Notable people ==
- Mary Jane Coggeshall, suffragist
- Thomas J. Graves, Medal of Honor recipient
- Glenn Liebhardt, baseball player
- Phil Pflum, former politician, farmer, manufacturing manager
- John James Piatt, poet and writer
- Abraham Shortridge, First Superintendent of Indianapolis Public School System, Second President of Purdue University

== See also ==
- Whitewater Canal
