= Jackson Township, Wayne County, Indiana =

Jackson Township
- Township
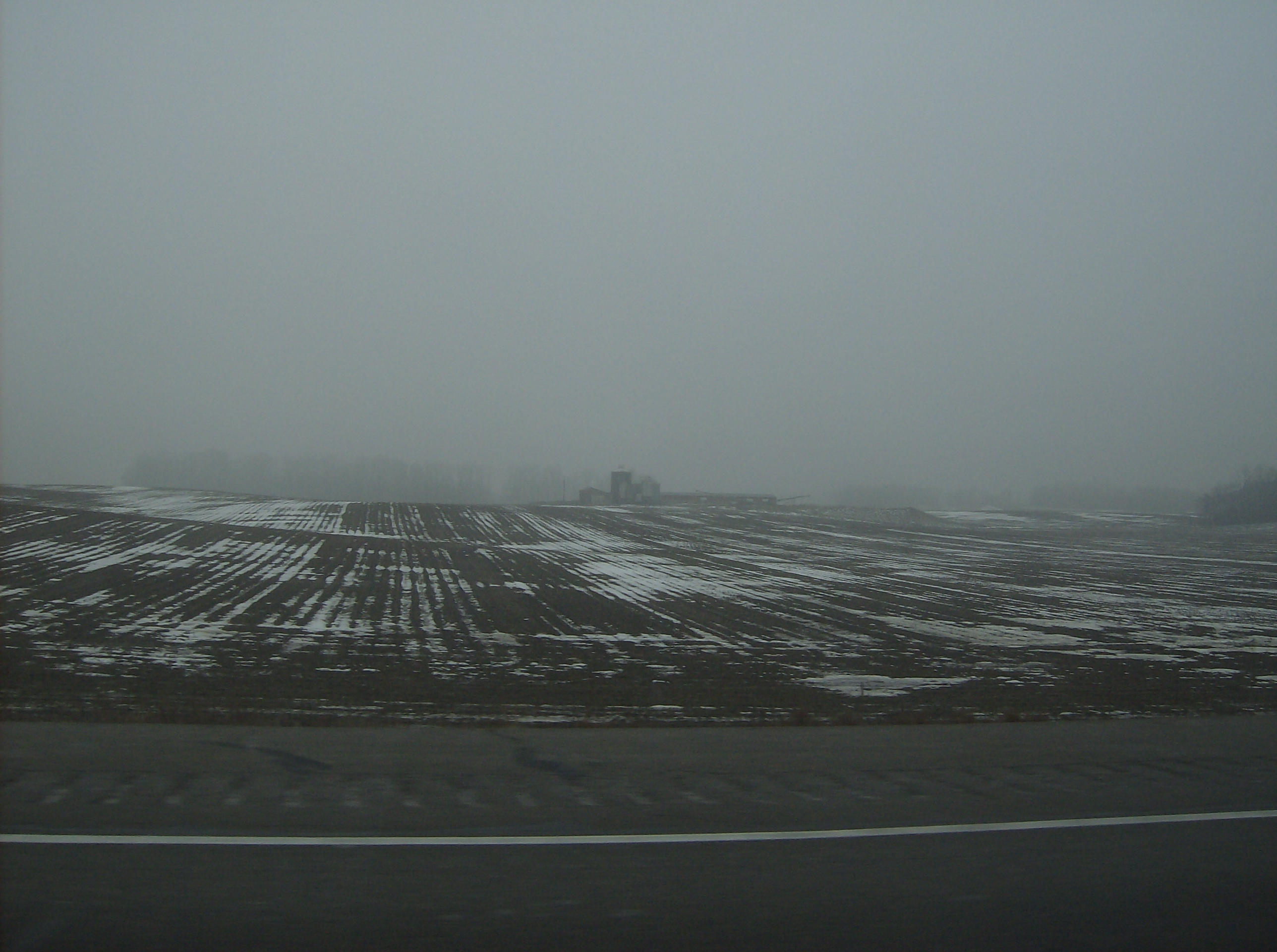
- Farmland in northeastern Jackson Township

- Location in Wayne County
- Coordinates: 39°49′17″N 85°09′59″W
- Country: United States
- State: Indiana
- County: Wayne

Government
  - Type: Indiana township

Area
  - Total: 28.33 sq mi (73.4 km^{2})
  - Land: 27.98 sq mi (72.5 km^{2})
  - Water: 0.35 sq mi (0.91 km^{2}) 1.24%
- Elevation: 945 ft (288 m)

Population (2020)
  - Total: 4,320
  - Density: 166.6/sq mi (64.3/km^{2})
- Time zone: UTC-5 (Eastern (EST))
  - Summer (DST): UTC-4 (EDT)
- Area code: 765
- GNIS feature ID: 453473
- Website: www.in.gov/townships/jackson89/

Jackson Township is one of fifteen townships in Wayne County, Indiana, United States. As of the 2010 census, its population was 4,660 and it contained 2,136 housing units.

== History ==
Jackson Township was organized in 1817.

== Geography ==
According to the 2010 census, the township has a total area of 28.33 square miles (73.4 km^{2}), of which 27.98 square miles (72.5 km^{2}) (or 98.76%) is land and 0.35 square miles (0.91 km^{2}) (or 1.24%) is water. Lakes in this township include Hi-Way Springs. The streams of Auburn Brook, Coon Creek, Crietz Creek, Horn Creek, Lick Branch, Pinhook Drain, Pronghorn Run, Springs Run and Symonds Creek run through this township.

=== Cities and towns ===
- Cambridge City
- Dublin
- East Germantown (also known as Pershing)
- Mount Auburn

=== Unincorporated towns ===
- Pennville at 39.8139355°N 85.1113531°W

(This list is based on USGS data and may include former settlements.)

=== Adjacent townships ===
- Jefferson Township (north)
- Center Township (east)
- Harrison Township (east)
- Washington Township (southeast)
- Posey Township, Fayette County (southwest)
- Dudley Township, Henry County (west)
- Liberty Township, Henry County (northwest)

=== Cemeteries ===
The township contains four cemeteries: Capitol Hill, East, Riverside and South Lawn.

=== Major highways ===
- Interstate 70
- U.S. Route 40
- State Road 1
