= Doddridge Chapel and Cemetery =

Historic church in Indiana, United States

- U.S. National Register of Historic Places
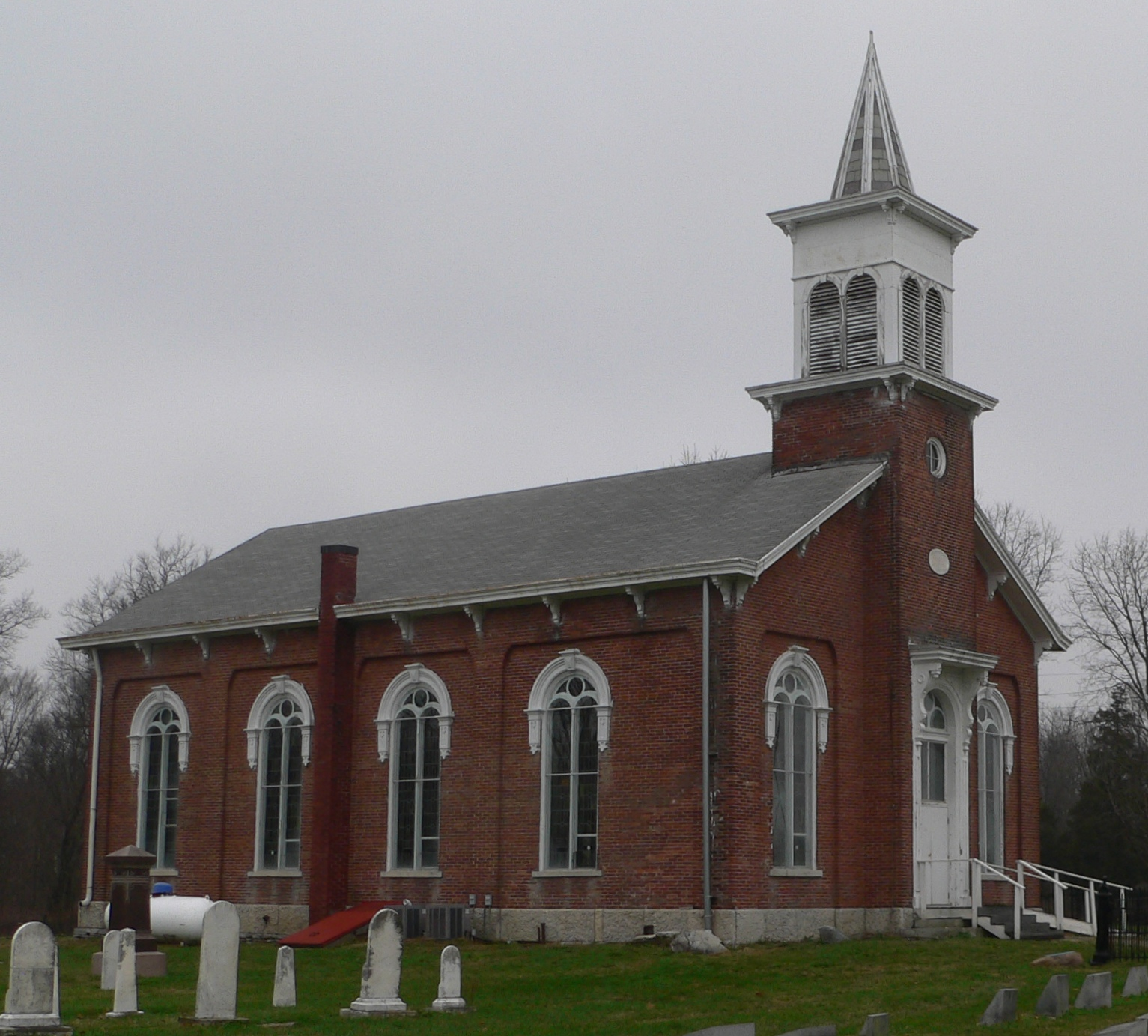
- Doddridge Chapel, December 2011

- Location within Indiana Location within the United States
- Location: 9471 Chapel Rd., southwest of Centerville in Washington Township, Wayne County, Indiana
- Coordinates: 39°45′4″N 85°3′21″W
- Area: 4 acres (1.6 ha)
- Built: 1818, 1876
- Built by: Wilson, Perry & Charles
- Architectural style: Italianate
- NRHP reference No.: 03000984
- Added to NRHP: September 28, 2003

Doddridge Chapel and Cemetery is a historic chapel and cemetery located in Washington Township, Wayne County, Indiana. The chapel was built in 1876, and is a one-story, rectangular, Italianate style brick building. It sits on a limestone foundation and has a gable roof topped by a belfry and steeple. The cemetery was established in 1818, and hold approximately 450 graves.

It was added to the National Register of Historic Places in 2003.
