= Beechwood (Isaac Kinsey House) =

Historic house in Indiana, United States

- U.S. National Register of Historic Places
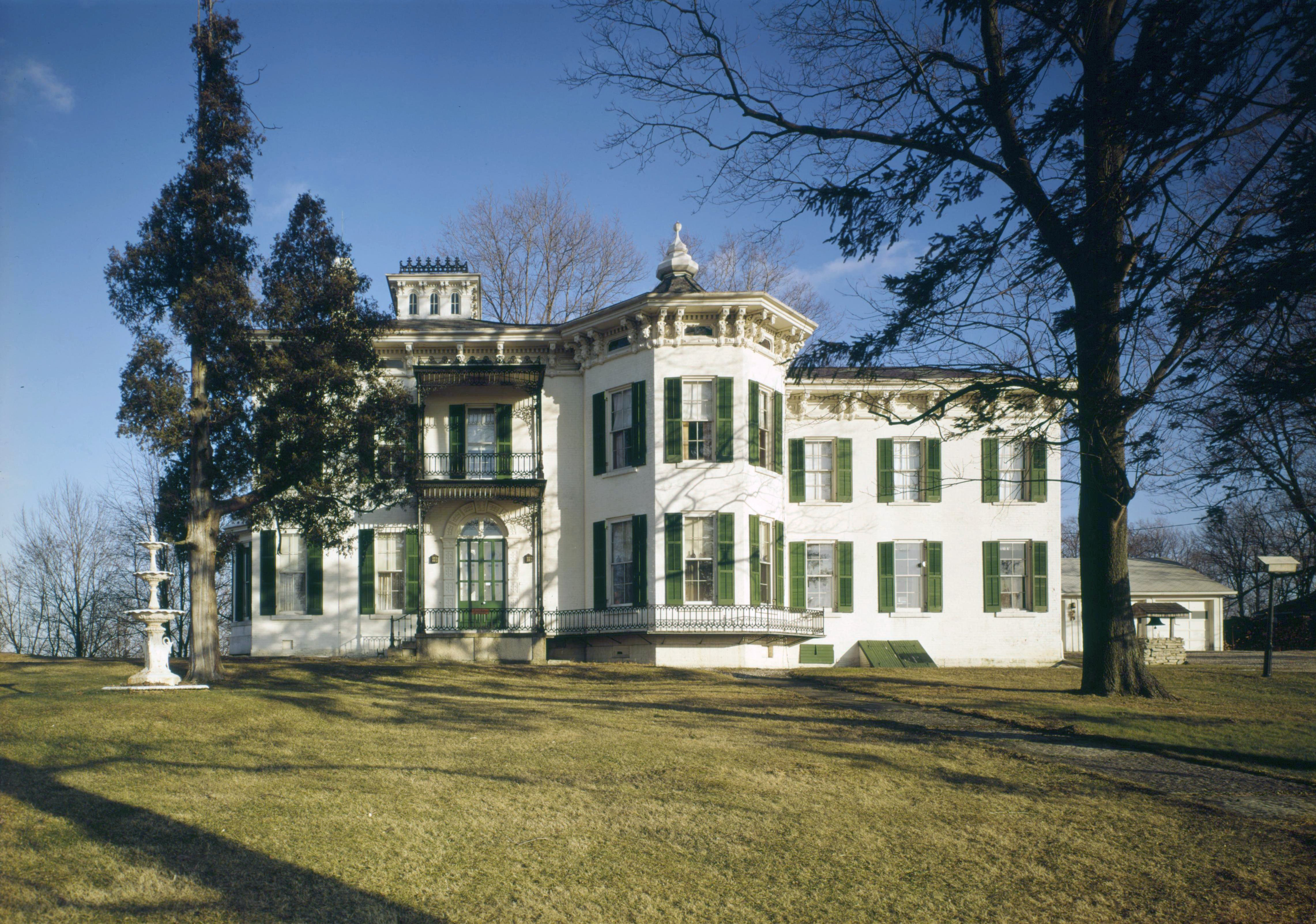
- Beechwood (Isaac Kinsey House), January 1975

- Location within Indiana Location within the United States
- Location: 2 miles south of Milton on Sarver Rd., Washington Township, Wayne County, Indiana
- Coordinates: 39°45′15″N 85°9′4″W
- Area: 6.5 acres (2.6 ha)
- Built: 1871
- Built by: Jones, Ferd.
- Architect: Stover, Joel
- Architectural style: Italianate
- NRHP reference No.: 75000031
- Added to NRHP: February 21, 1975

Beechwood (Isaac Kinsey House) is a historic home and farm located in Washington Township, Wayne County, Indiana. It was built in 1871, and is a two-story, Italianate style brick dwelling with a hipped roof topped by a cupola. It features a semicircular stone arched main entry surrounded by a two-story, wrought iron verandah and projecting two-story semi-hexagonal bay. Also on the property are the contributing dairy house, smokehouse, granary, barn, cow shed, and carriage house.

It was added to the National Register of Historic Places in 1975.
