= Witt-Champe-Myers House =

Historic house in Indiana, United States

- U.S. National Register of Historic Places
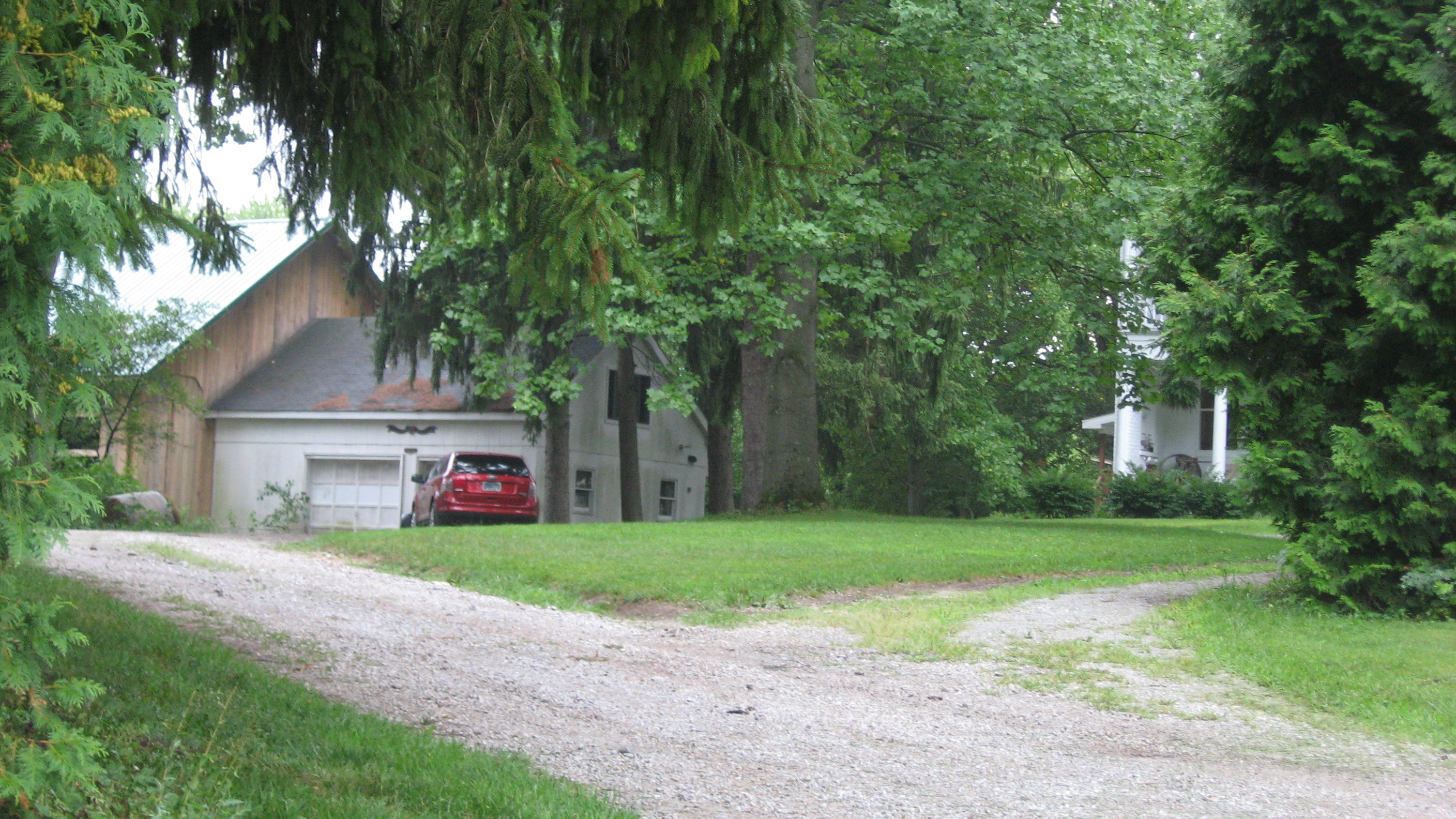
- Witt-Champe-Myers driveway, August 2011

- Location within Indiana Location within the United States
- Location: Jct. of Spring and Foundry Sts., SE corner, Dublin, Indiana
- Coordinates: 39°48′38″N 85°12′7″W
- Area: 3 acres (1.2 ha)
- Built: 1837-1838
- Architectural style: Federal
- NRHP reference No.: 95000700
- Added to NRHP: June 9, 1995

Witt-Champe-Myers House is a historic home located at Dublin, Indiana. It was built in 1837–38, and is a two-story, Federal style painted brick detached dwelling. It features a two-story front portico with Tuscan order columns on the first story and Doric order columns on the second. Also on the property are the contributing one-room brick house (1837), small brick smokehouse, and brick spring house.

It was added to the National Register of Historic Places in 1995.
