= David Worth Dennis House =

Historic house in Indiana, United States

- U.S. National Register of Historic Places
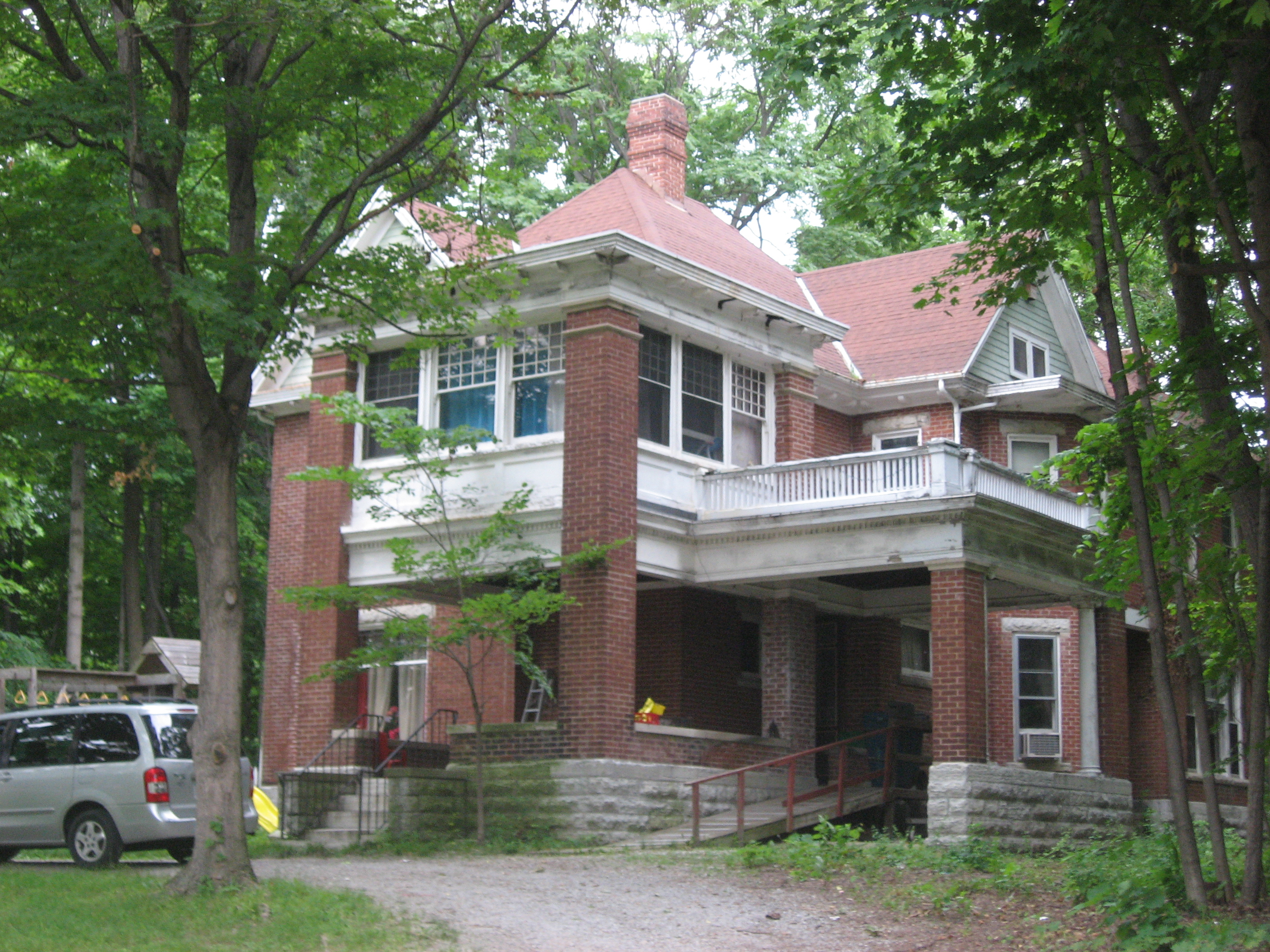
- David Worth Dennis House, July 2011

- Location within Indiana Location within the United States
- Location: 610 W. Main St., Richmond, Indiana
- Coordinates: 39°49′45″N 84°54′36″W
- Area: 1.8 acres (0.73 ha)
- Built: 1895, 1909
- Architect: Hasecoster, John A.
- Architectural style: Queen Anne, Classical Revival
- NRHP reference No.: 01000404
- Added to NRHP: April 25, 2001

David Worth Dennis House, also known as Woodlawn, is a historic home located at Richmond, Indiana. It was built in 1895, and is a two-story, cubic, Queen Anne style brick dwelling. It has a hipped roof with lower cross-gables and a two-story gabled wing designed by architect John A. Hasecoster and added in 1909. It features a two-story porch and single-story porte cochere. It's builder's grandson was U.S. Congressman David W. Dennis.

It was listed on the National Register of Historic Places in 2001.
