= Washington Township, Wayne County, Indiana =

Washington Township
- Township
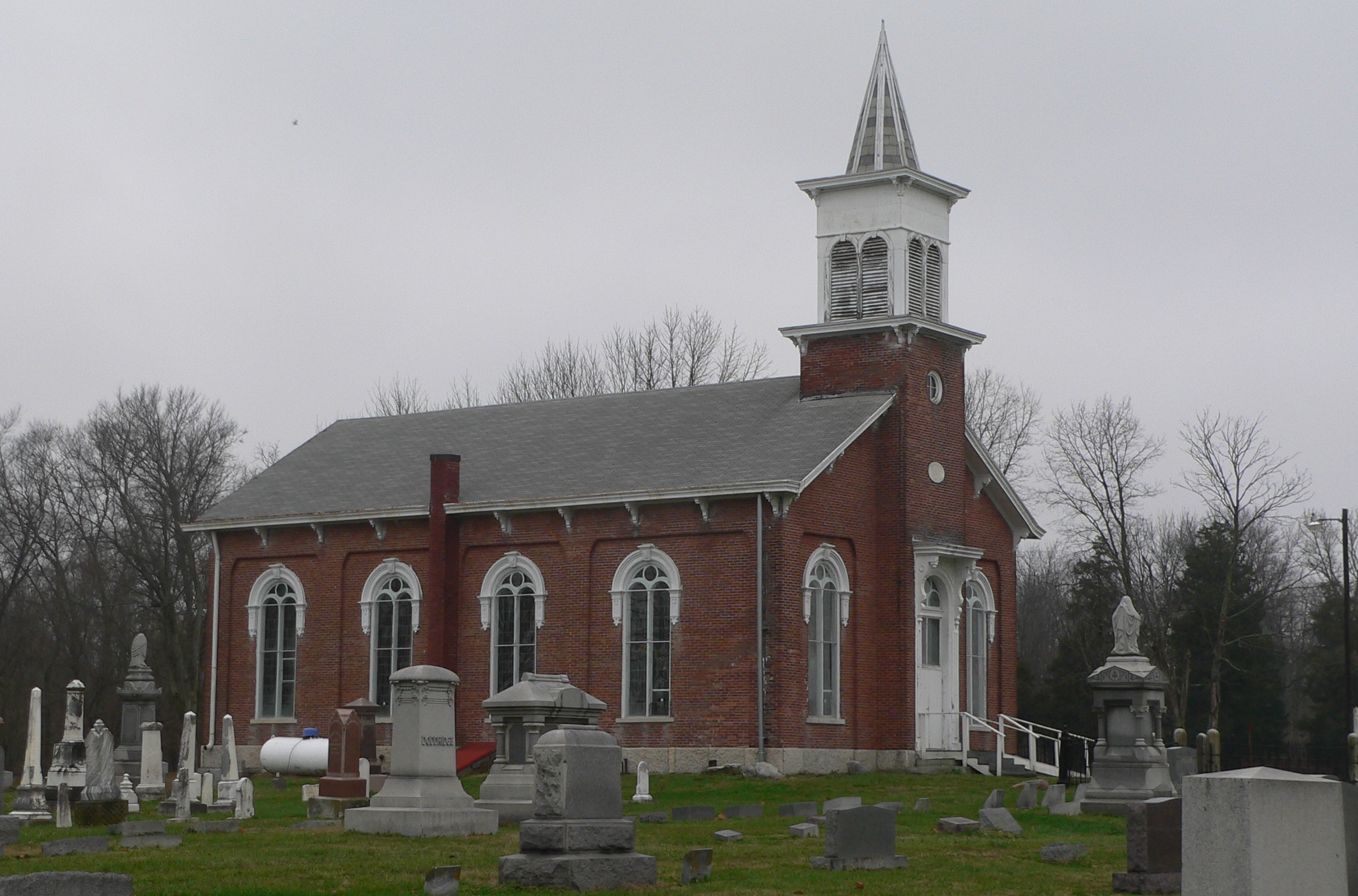
- Doddridge Chapel, a historic place in the township

- Location in Wayne County
- Coordinates: 39°45′15″N 85°06′51″W
- Country: United States
- State: Indiana
- County: Wayne

Government
  - Type: Indiana township

Area
  - Total: 42.08 sq mi (109.0 km^{2})
  - Land: 41.6 sq mi (108 km^{2})
  - Water: 0.48 sq mi (1.2 km^{2}) 1.14%
- Elevation: 883 ft (269 m)

Population (2020)
  - Total: 1,384
  - Density: 34.5/sq mi (13.3/km^{2})
- Time zone: UTC-5 (Eastern (EST))
  - Summer (DST): UTC-4 (EDT)
- Area code: 765
- GNIS feature ID: 454024

Washington Township is one of fifteen townships in Wayne County, Indiana, United States. As of the 2010 census, its population was 1,436 and it contained 626 housing units.

== History ==
Washington Township was organized in 1817.

Beechwood (Isaac Kinsey House) and the Doddridge Chapel and Cemetery are listed on the National Register of Historic Places.

== Geography ==
According to the 2010 census, the township has a total area of 42.08 square miles (109.0 km^{2}), of which 41.6 square miles (108 km^{2}) (or 98.86%) is land and 0.48 square miles (1.2 km^{2}) (or 1.14%) is water. The streams of Brethren Run, Butlers Creek, Central Run, City Run, Common Run, Dry Branch, Franklin Creek, Greens Fork, Martindale Creek, Milton Drain, Shaker Run, Warm Run, Wilson Run and Woodclinch Brook run through this township.

=== Cities and towns ===
- Milton

=== Unincorporated towns ===
(This list is based on USGS data and may include former settlements.)

=== Adjacent townships ===
- Center Township (northeast)
- Abington Township (east)
- Waterloo Township, Fayette County (southeast)
- Harrison Township, Fayette County (southwest)
- Posey Township, Fayette County (west)
- Jackson Township (northwest)

=== Cemeteries ===
The township contains six cemeteries: Doddridge Chapel Cemetery, Franklin, Friends, South Side, United Brethren and West Side.

=== Major highways ===
- Indiana State Road 1
