= Phil Pflum =

American politician

Member of the Indiana House of Representatives from the 56th district
- In office 2002–2012
- Preceded by: Richard W. Bodiker
- Succeeded by: Dick Hamm

Personal details
- Party: Democratic
- Spouse: Diana
- Occupation: Farmer, manufacturing manager

Phillip C. Pflum is a Democratic member of the Indiana House of Representatives, representing the 56th District from 2002 to 2012.
