= Richmond Gas Company Building =

- Formerly listed on the U.S. National Register of Historic Places
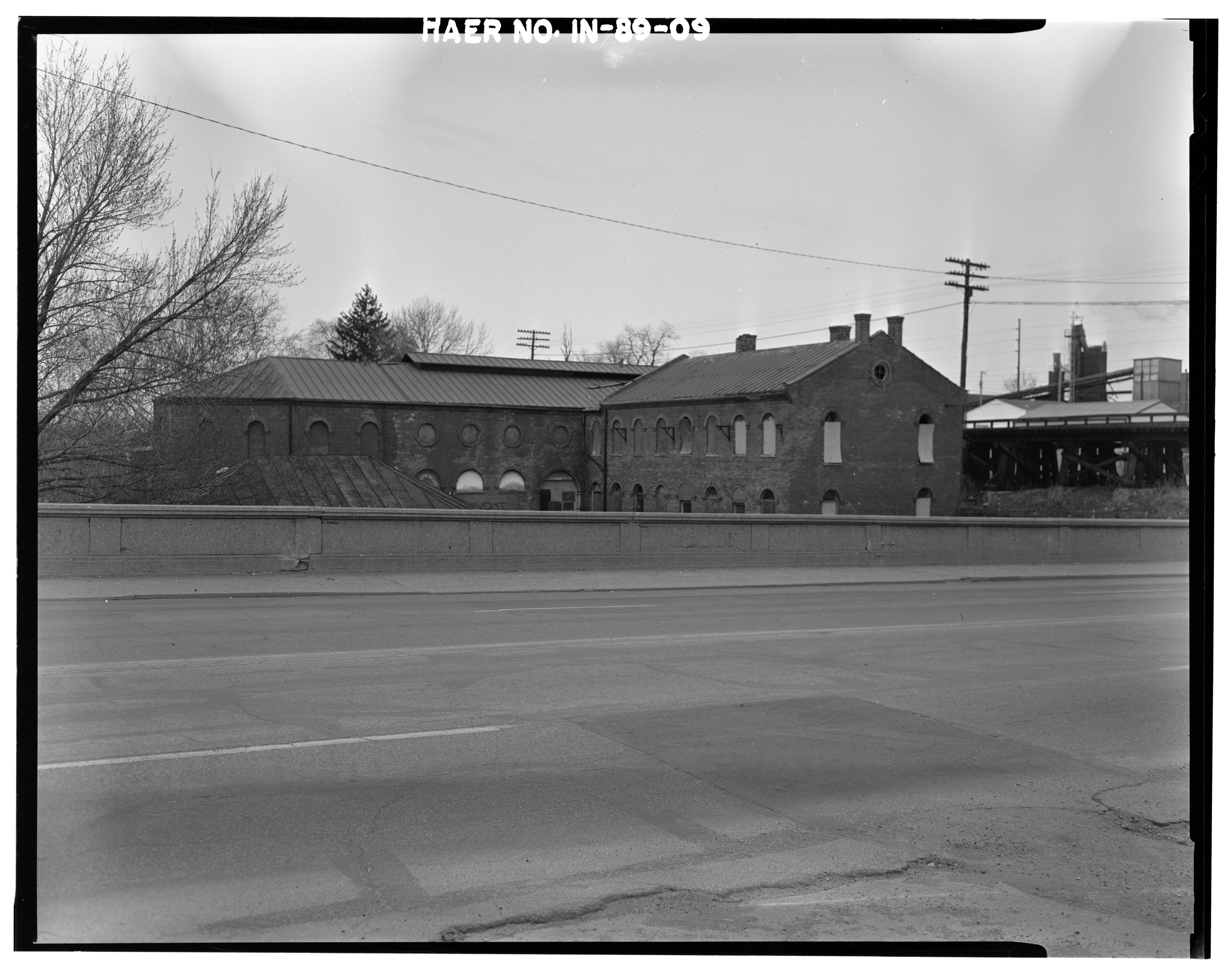
- Richmond Gas Company Building, HAER Photo

- Location within Indiana Location within the United States
- Location: 100 E. Main St., Richmond, Indiana
- Coordinates: 39°49′47″N 84°53′58″W
- Area: 1.9 acres (0.77 ha)
- Built: 1855
- Built by: Collier, Charles
- Architectural style: Late Victorian
- NRHP reference No.: 81000023

Significant dates
- Added to NRHP: August 25, 1981
- Removed from NRHP: June 15, 2012

Richmond Gas Company Building was a historic commercial building located at Richmond, Indiana. It was built in 1855, and was a two-story, L-shaped, early Victorian style brick building. It had a gable roof supported by steel trusses and round and arched windows.

It was listed on the National Register of Historic Places in 1981 and delisted in 2012.
