= Pennville, Wayne County, Indiana =

Pennville
- Unincorporated community
- Location within Indiana Location within the United States
- Coordinates: 39°48′50″N 85°06′41″W
- Country: United States
- State: Indiana
- County: Wayne
- Township: Jackson
- Elevation: 1,001 ft (305 m)
- Time zone: UTC-5 (Eastern (EST))
  - Summer (DST): UTC-4 (EDT)
- ZIP code: 47327
- Area code: 765
- GNIS feature ID: 441002

Pennville is an unincorporated community in Jackson Township, Wayne County, in the U.S. state of Indiana.
