= Earlham College Observatory =

- U.S. National Register of Historic Places
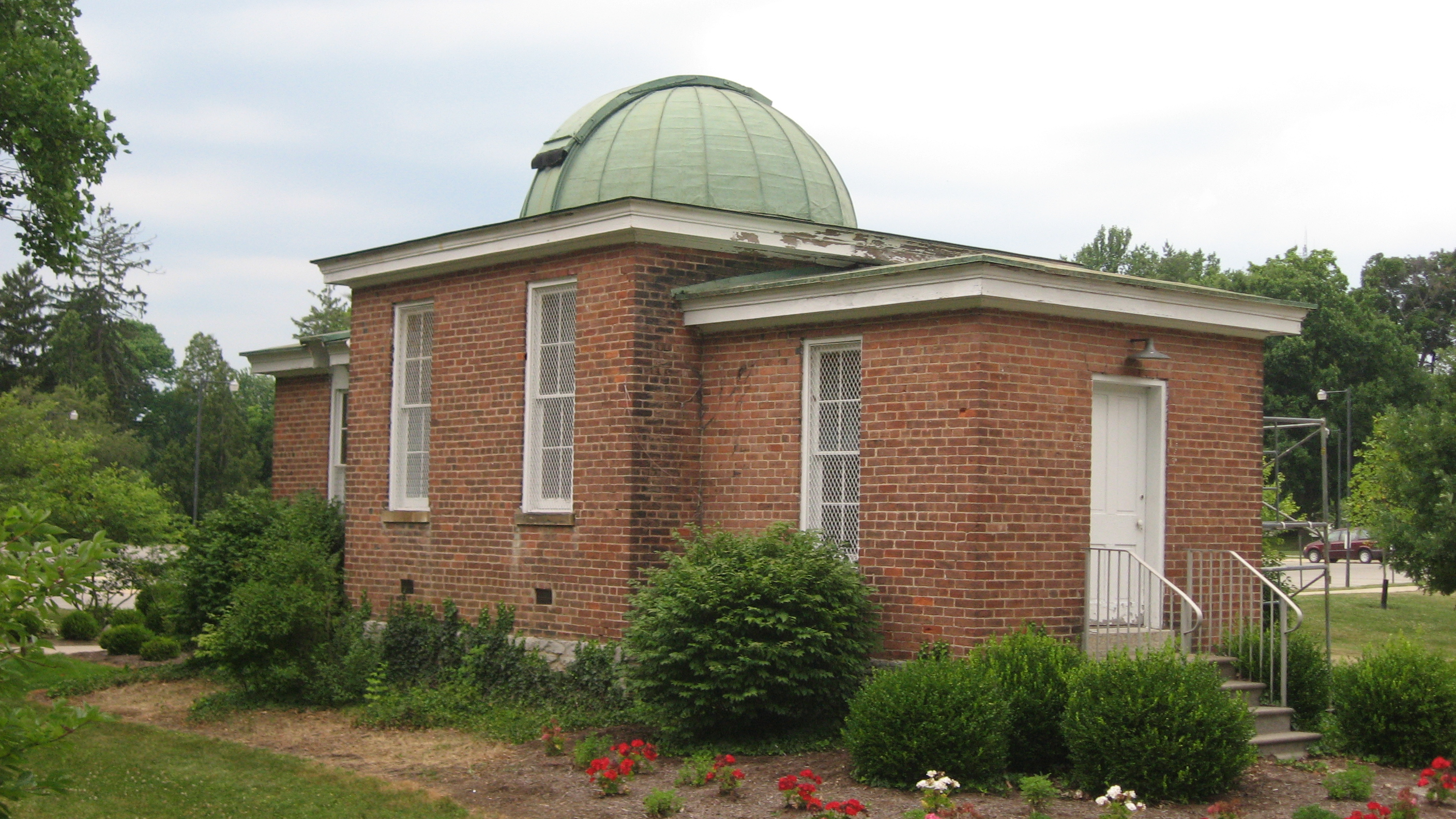
- Earlham College Observatory, July 2011

- Location within Indiana Location within the United States
- Location: National Rd., Earlham College campus, Richmond, Indiana
- Coordinates: 39°49′28″N 84°54′51″W
- Area: less than one acre
- Built: 1861
- Architectural style: Late Victorian
- NRHP reference No.: 75000034
- Added to NRHP: October 21, 1975

Earlham College Observatory is a historic observatory building located on the campus of Earlham College at Richmond, Indiana. It was built in 1861, and is a one-story, brick building with a hipped roof. It consists of a 19-foot-square central section topped by a copper dome with a removable section, and flanked by 10-foot by 19-foot sections. Beneath the revolvable dome is a 6 1/2-inch objective lens telescope located in the center of the main block.

It was listed on the National Register of Historic Places in 1975.

== See also ==
- List of astronomical observatories
