= Centerville Historic District (Centerville, Indiana) =

Historic district in Indiana, United States

- U.S. National Register of Historic Places
- U.S. Historic district
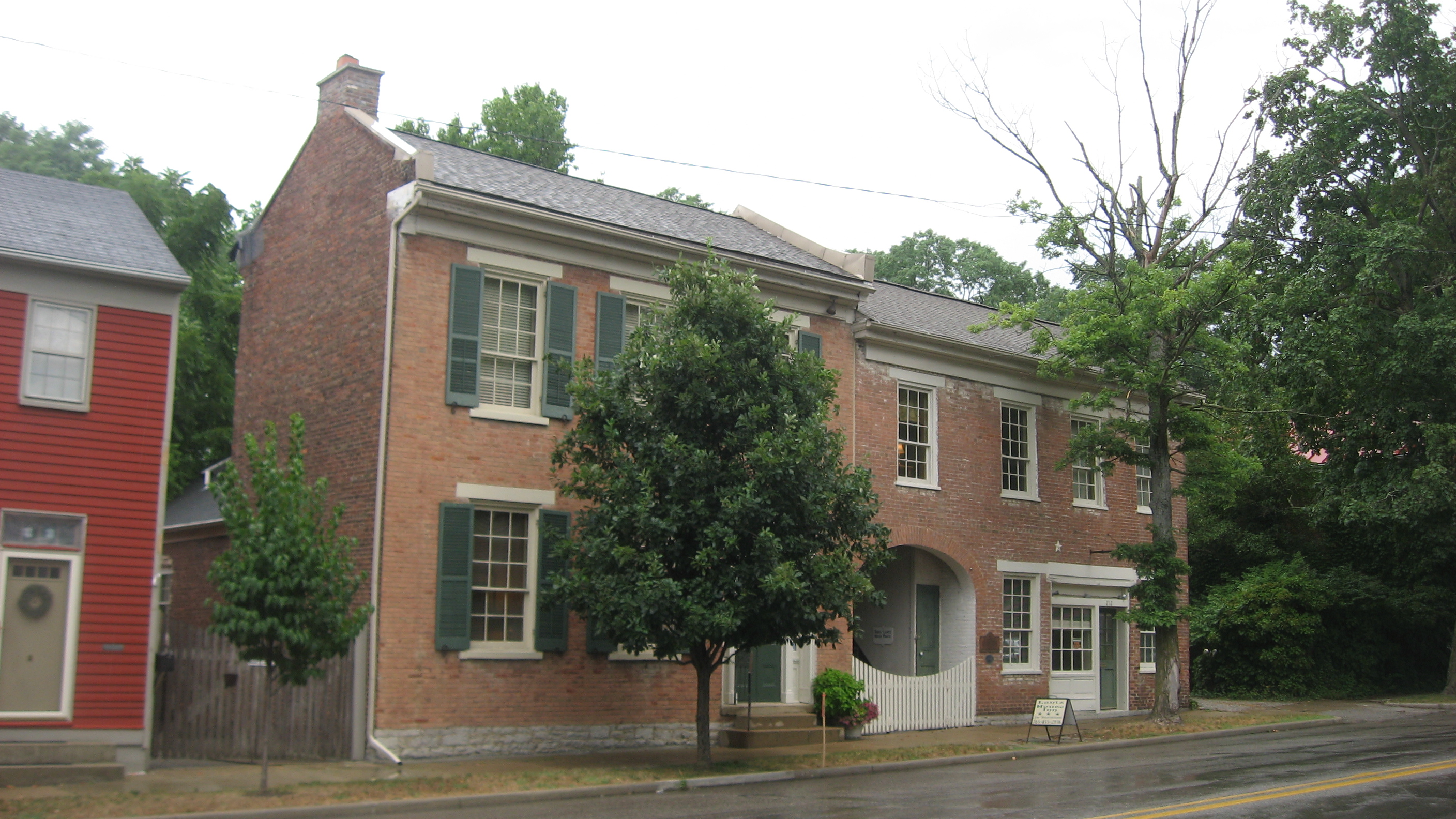
- Lantz House Inn, August 2011

- Location within Indiana Location within the United States
- Location: Bounded by the Corporation line, 3rd and South Sts., and Willow Grove Rd., Centerville, Indiana
- Coordinates: 39°49′09″N 85°00′02″W
- Area: 60 acres (24 ha)
- Architectural style: Greek Revival, Federal, Italianate
- NRHP reference No.: 71000008
- Added to NRHP: October 26, 1971

Centerville Historic District is a national historic district located at Centerville, Indiana. The district encompasses 115 contributing buildings in the central business district and surrounding residential sections of Centerville. It developed between about 1817 and 1873 and includes representative examples of Greek Revival, Italianate, and Federal style architecture. During this period it was county seat of Wayne County. Located in the district is the separately listed Oliver P. Morton House. Other notable contributing buildings include Morton's Row, Lantz' Row, Archway row, Tarkington Homestead (c. 1830), Jacob Julian House (1857), the Mansion House (1837), the Jones House (c. 1830), and the American House (1838–39).

The district was added to the National Register of Historic Places in 1971.
