= Louise Vickroy Boyd =

American poet

Louise Esther Vickroy Boyd
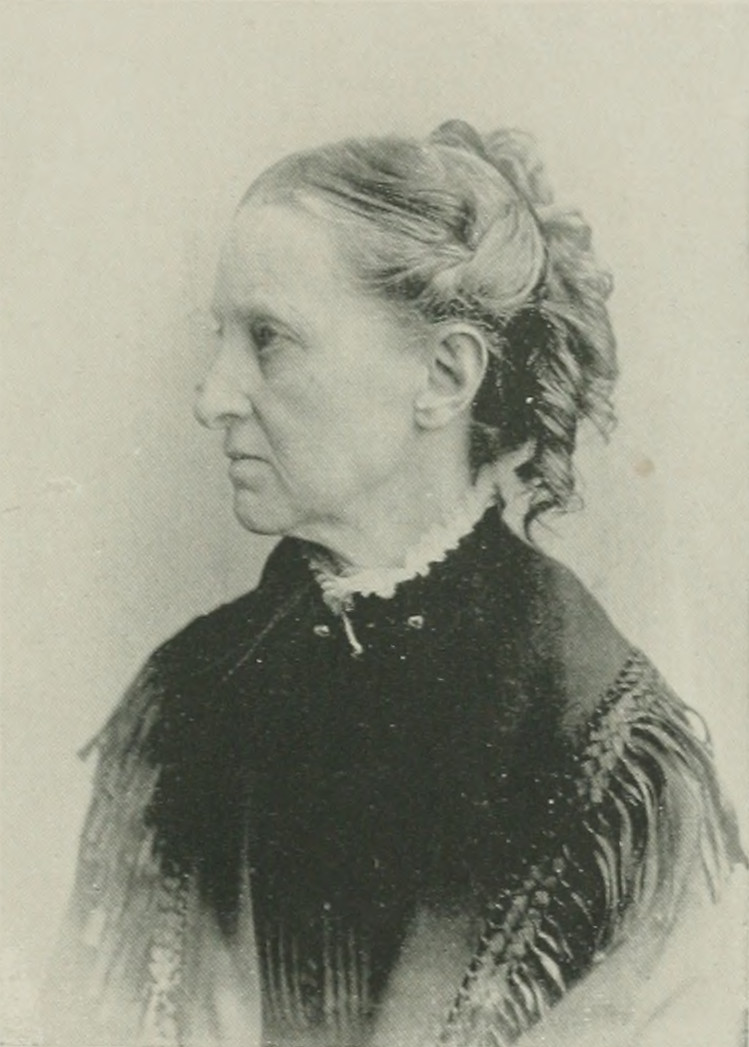
- Boyd in an 1893 publication
- Born: Louise Esther Vickroy; January 2, 1827; Urbana, Ohio, U.S.
- Died: July 25, 1909 (aged 82); Ada, Ohio, U.S.
- Writing career
- Genre: Poetry

Louise Vickroy Boyd (January 2, 1827 – July 25, 1909) was an American writer.

She was born Louise Esther Vickroy in Urbana, Ohio and moved to Ferndale, Pennsylvania. She was educated in Lancaster and Philadelphia. She taught school until September 1865 when she married Dr. S.S. Boyd and settled in Dublin, Indiana. She was an advocate for women's suffrage and temperance. Her husband died in 1888.

Boyd wrote her first poem in 1851. She contributed to The Little Pilgrim, as well as The Knickerbocker, The Saturday Evening Post, Appletons' Journal, Graham's Magazine, the New-York Tribune, the Cincinnati Gazette, the Woman's Journal and other publications. Several of her poems were translated into German, including four translated by the German-American author Karl Knortz. She also published stories for children and essays.

Boyd died at her sister's home in Ada, Ohio and was buried in Dublin.
