= Dublin, Indiana =

- Town
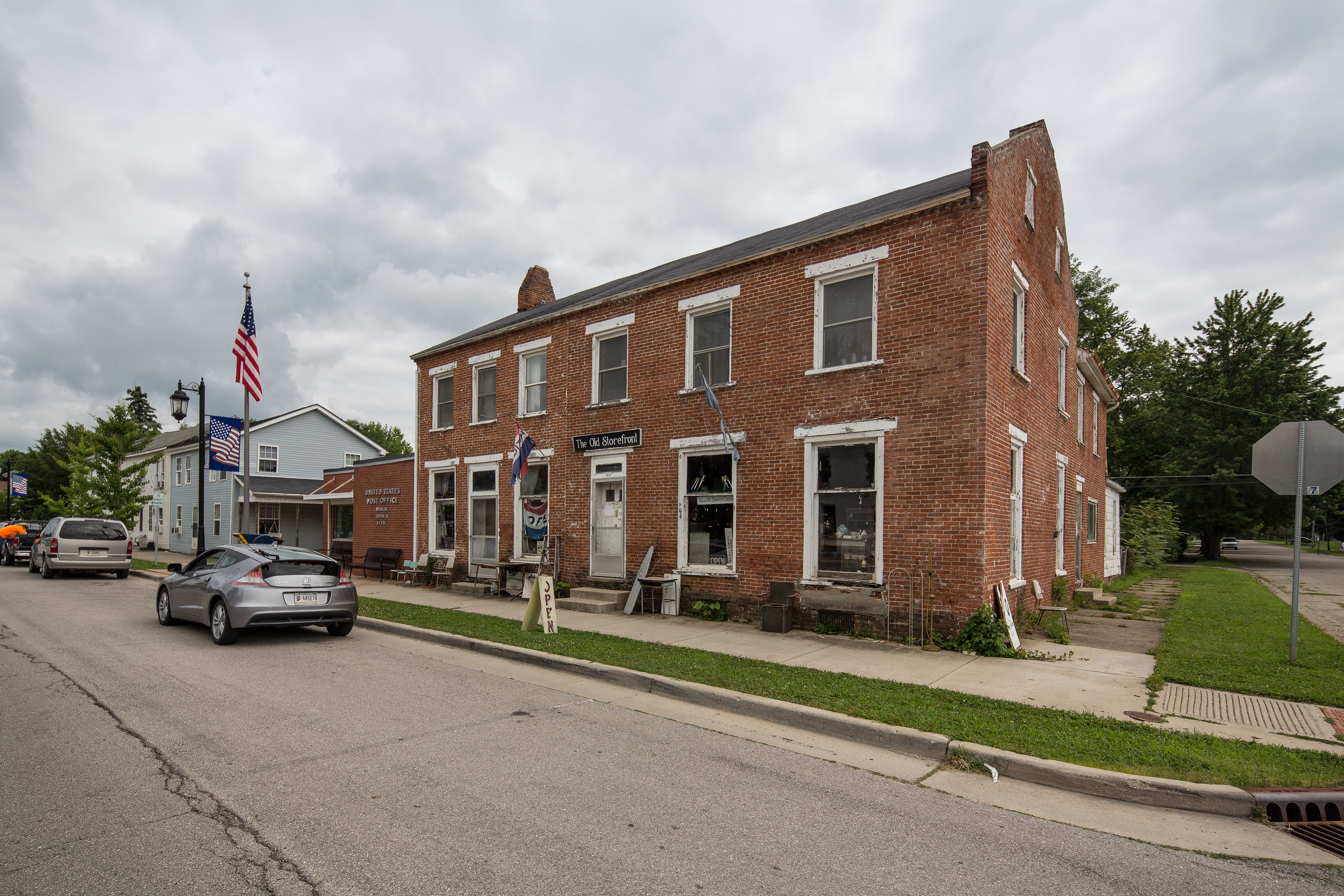

- Seal

- Location of Dublin in Wayne County, Indiana.
- Coordinates: 39°48′46″N 85°12′20″W
- Country: United States
- State: Indiana
- County: Wayne
- Township: Jackson

Area
  - Total: 0.53 sq mi (1.37 km^{2})
  - Land: 0.52 sq mi (1.34 km^{2})
  - Water: 0.015 sq mi (0.04 km^{2})
- Elevation: 1,056 ft (322 m)

Population (2020)
  - Total: 679
  - Density: 1,316.3/sq mi (508.23/km^{2})
- Time zone: UTC-5 (Eastern (EST))
  - Summer (DST): UTC-5 (EST)
- ZIP code: 47335
- Area code: 765
- FIPS code: 18-18766
- GNIS feature ID: 2396689
- Website: www.townofdublin.in.gov

Dublin is a town in Jackson Township, Wayne County, in the U.S. state of Indiana. The population was 679 at the 2020 census.

== History ==
Dublin was laid out and platted in 1830. It is named after the city of Dublin in Ireland. A post office has been in operation at Dublin since 1833. On October 15, 1851, the Indiana Woman's Suffrage Association was created in Dublin. The Witt-Champe-Myers House was added to the National Register of Historic Places in 1995.

== Geography ==
According to the 2010 census, Dublin has a total area of 0.54 square miles (1.40 km^{2}), of which 0.53 square miles (1.37 km^{2}) (or 98.15%) is land and 0.01 square miles (0.03 km^{2}) (or 1.85%) is water.

== Demographics ==
Historical population
Census	Pop.	Note	%±
1850	713		—
1860	967		35.6%
1870	1,076		11.3%
1880	1,070		−0.6%
1890	806		−24.7%
1900	698		−13.4%
1910	704		0.9%
1920	630		−10.5%
1930	727		15.4%
1940	751		3.3%
1950	993		32.2%
1960	1,021		2.8%
1970	1,021		0.0%
1980	979		−4.1%
1990	805		−17.8%
2000	697		−13.4%
2010	790		13.3%
2020	679		−14.1%
U.S. Decennial Census

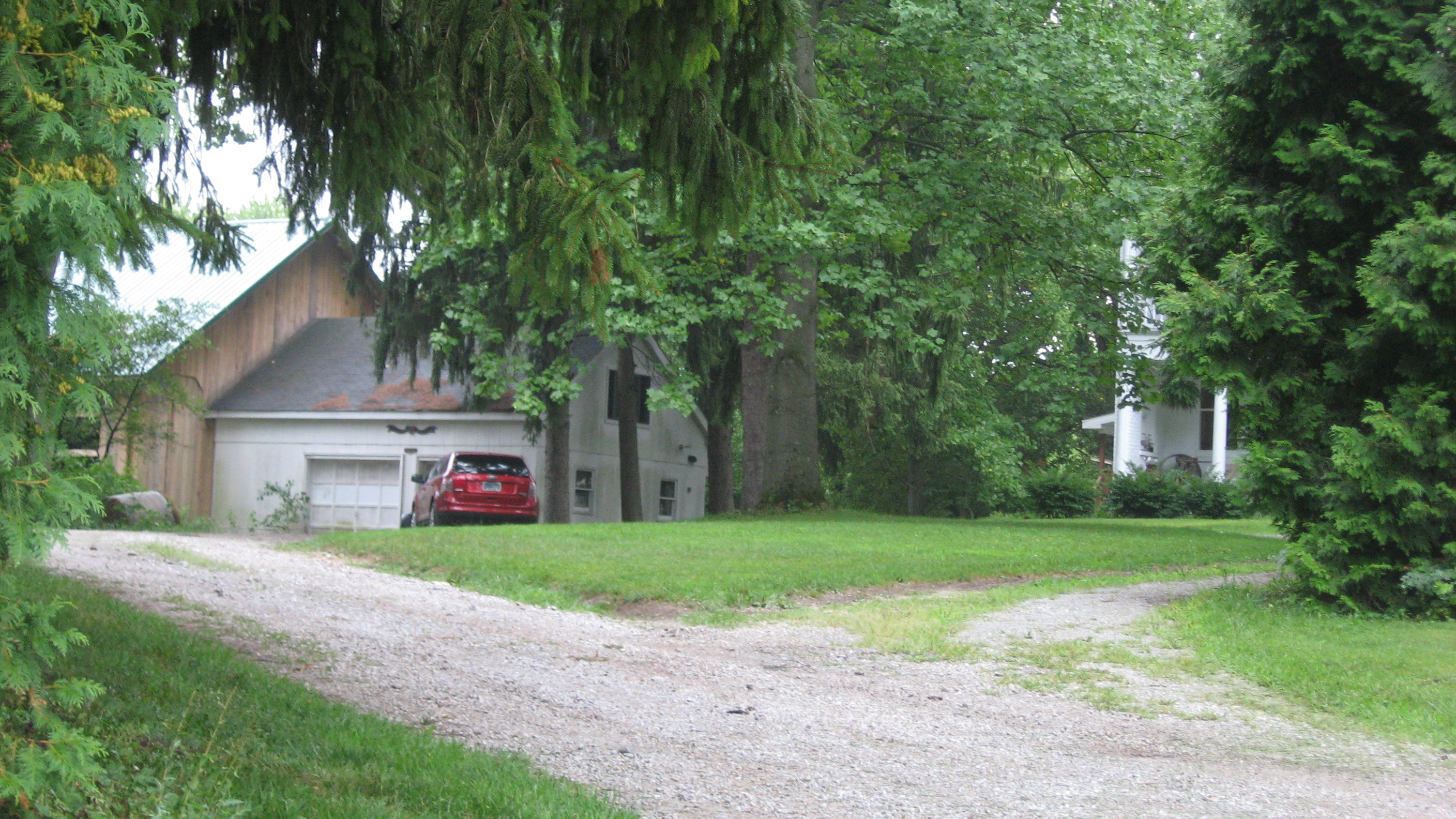
Witt-Champe-Myers House in Dublin is listed on the National Register of Historic Places

=== 2010 census ===
At the 2010 census, there were 790 people, 325 households, and 210 families living in the town. The population density was 1,490.6 per square mile (575.5/km^{2}). There were 367 housing units at an average density of 692.5 per square mile (267.4/km^{2}). The racial make-up of the town was 98.0% White, 0.3% African American, 0.5% Asian and 1.3% from two or more races. Hispanic or Latino of any race were 0.9% of the population.

There were 325 households, of which 31.1% had children under the age of 18 living with them, 52.0% were married couples living together, 9.2% had a female householder with no husband present, 3.4% had a male householder with no wife present and 35.4% were non-families. 30.8% of all households were made up of individuals, and 17.6% had someone living alone who was 65 years of age or older. The average household size was 2.43 and the average family size was 3.05.

The median age in the town was 42.1 years. 22.9% of residents were under the age of 18; 7.3% were between the ages of 18 and 24; 23.3% were from 25 to 44; 27.7% were from 45 to 64; and 18.7% were 65 years of age or older. The gender makeup of the town was 47.2% male and 52.8% female.

=== 2000 census ===
At the 2000 census, there were 697 people, 263 households and 203 families living in the town. The population density was 1,295.0 per square mile (500.0/km^{2}). There were 283 housing units at an average density of 525.8 per square mile (203.0/km^{2}). The racial make-up of the town was 99.28% White, 0.14% Asian and 0.57% from two or more races. Hispanic or Latino of any race were 0.57% of the population.

There were 263 households, of which 37.6% had children under the age of 18 living with them, 61.2% were married couples living together, 9.9% had a female householder with no husband present and 22.8% were non-families. 20.2% of all households were made up of individuals, and 12.5% had someone living alone who was 65 years of age or older. The average household size was 2.65 and the average family size was 3.03.

28.1% of the population were under the age of 18, 7.2% from 18 to 24, 27.7% from 25 to 44, 23.2% from 45 to 64 and 13.8% were 65 years of age or older. The median age was 36 years. For every 100 females, there were 90.4 males. For every 100 females age 18 and over, there were 86.2 males.

The median household income was $31,111 and the median family income was $31,488. Males had a median income of $29,028 and females $17,500. The per capita income was $13,656. About 8.6% of families and 13.9% of the population were below the poverty line, including 23.9% of those under age 18 and 5.7% of those age 65 or over.

== Education ==
The town has a lending library, the Dublin Public school Library.

== Notable people ==
- Louise Vickroy Boyd, writer and suffrage activist
- Lilith Martin Wilson, Pennsylvania state representative
