= Oliver P. Morton House =

Historic house in Indiana, United States

- U.S. National Register of Historic Places
- U.S. Historic district – Contributing property
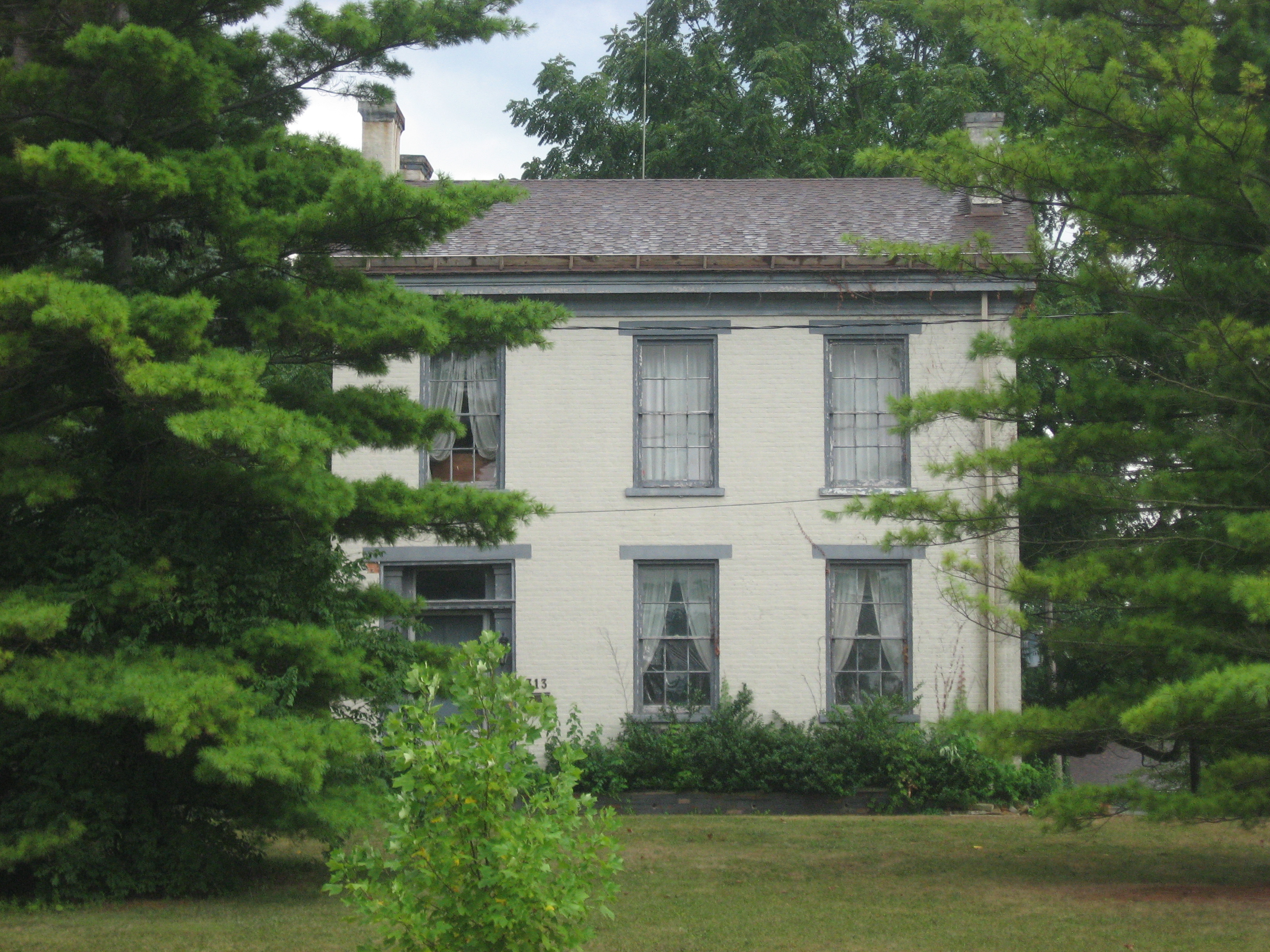
- Oliver P. Morton House, August 2011

- Location within Indiana Location within the United States
- Location: 319 W. Main St., Centerville, Indiana
- Coordinates: 39°49′2″N 85°0′2″W
- Area: 1 acre (0.40 ha)
- Built: 1848
- Built by: Wilson, C. T.
- Architect: Dill, John C.
- Architectural style: Grecian Influence
- NRHP reference No.: 75000038
- Added to NRHP: October 10, 1975

Oliver P. Morton House is a historic home located at Centerville, Indiana. It was built in 1848, and is a two-story, three-bay, brick detached row house with Greek Revival style design influences. It has a rear service wing with an attached smokehouse. It was the home of Indiana Governor and U.S. Senator Oliver P. Morton (1823–1877).

It was added to the National Register of Historic Places in 1975. It is located in the Centerville Historic District.
