= Westcott Stock Farm =

- U.S. National Register of Historic Places
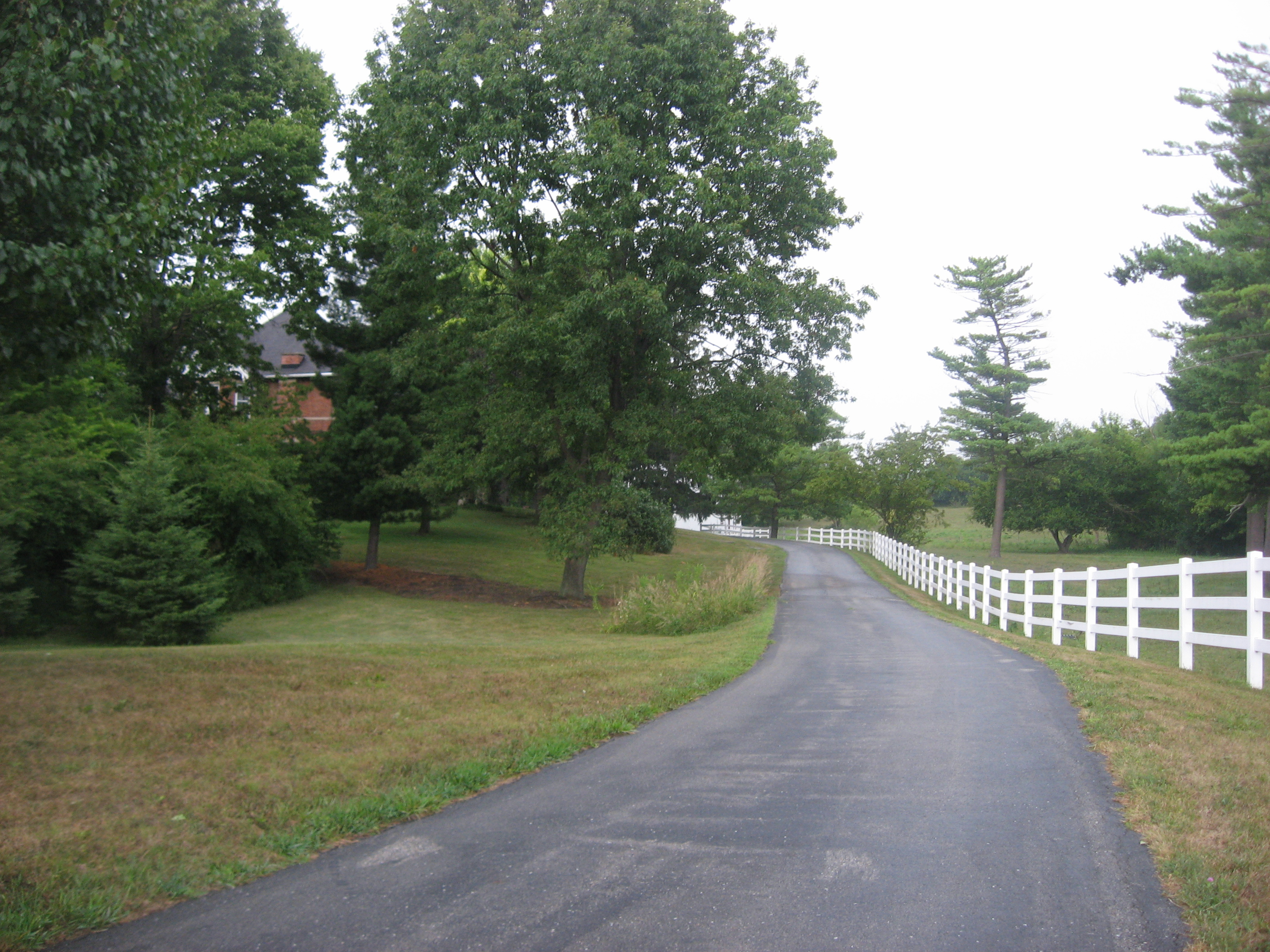
- Westcott Stock Farm driveway, August 2011

- Location within Indiana Location within the United States
- Location: 306 East North St., Centerville, Indiana
- Coordinates: 39°49′18″N 84°59′37″W
- Area: 28 acres (11 ha)
- Built: 1890-1895
- Architectural style: Queen Anne
- NRHP reference No.: 98001522
- Added to NRHP: December 17, 1998

Westcott Stock Farm, also known as Westcott Place Farm, is a historic home and farm located at Centerville, Indiana. The farmhouse was built between 1890 and 1895, and is a large two-story, Queen Anne style brick dwelling. It sits on a brick foundation and features a semi-octagonal bay. Also on the property are the contributing laundry house / tool shed, garage, carriage house, horse barn, bank barn, a small calving shed, and a cistern with a hand-operated pump.

It was added to the National Register of Historic Places in 1998.
