= Centerville, Indiana =

- Town
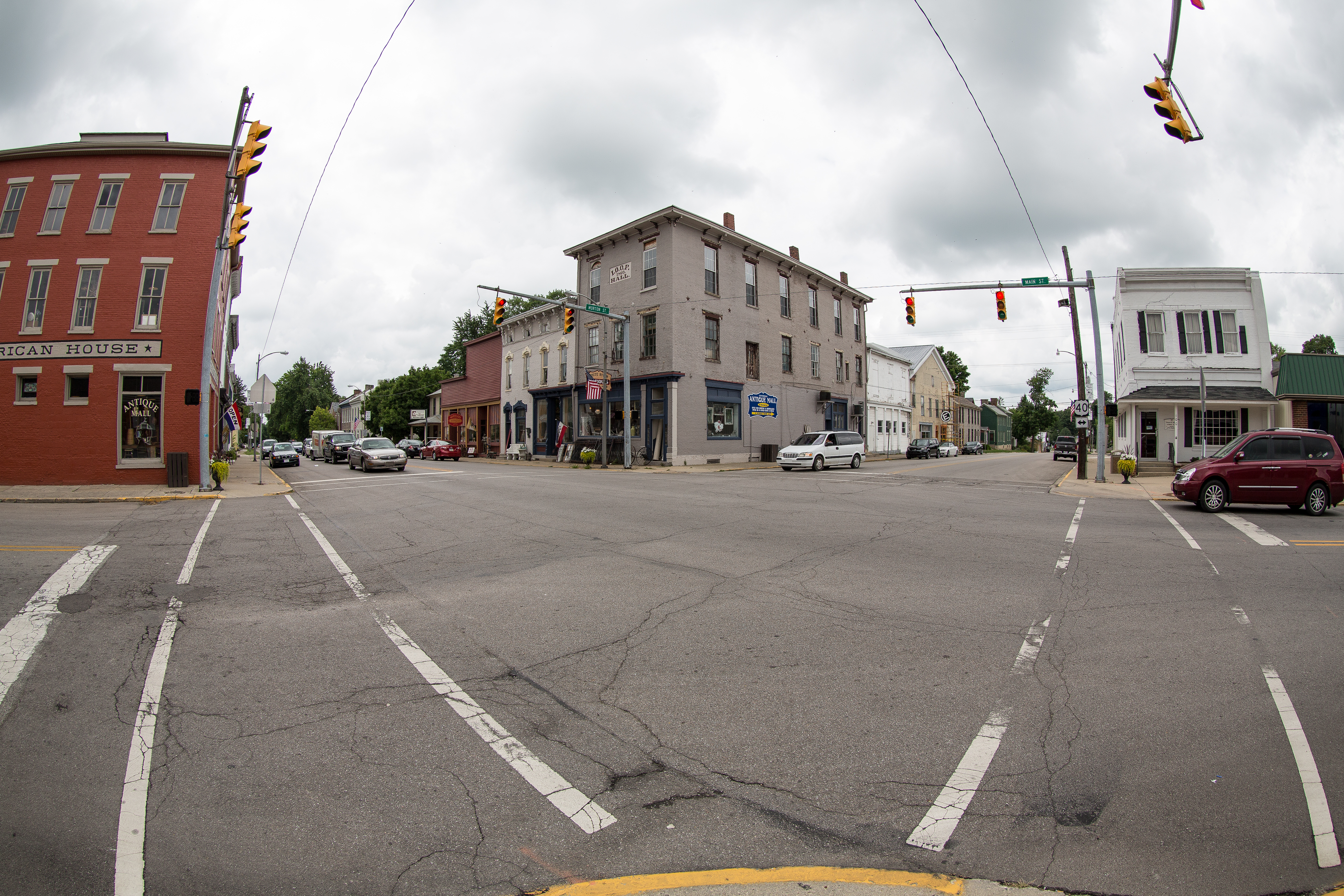

- Logo

- Location of Centerville in Wayne County, Indiana.
- Coordinates: 39°49′31″N 85°00′03″W
- Country: United States
- State: Indiana
- County: Wayne
- Township: Center
- Platted: 1814

Area
  - Total: 3.54 sq mi (9.17 km^{2})
  - Land: 3.52 sq mi (9.11 km^{2})
  - Water: 0.023 sq mi (0.06 km^{2})
- Elevation: 1,020 ft (310 m)

Population (2020)
  - Total: 2,748
  - Density: 781/sq mi (301.6/km^{2})
- Time zone: UTC-5 (Eastern)
  - Summer (DST): UTC-5 (EDT)
- ZIP code: 47330
- Area code: 765
- FIPS code: 18-11836
- GNIS feature ID: 2396637
- Website: town.centerville.in.us

Centerville is a town in Center Township, Wayne County, in the U.S. state of Indiana. The population was 2,748 at the 2020 United States Census.

== Geography ==
U.S. Route 40 runs east−west through town along Main Street.

According to the 2010 census, Centerville has a total area of 2.4 square miles (6.22 km^{2}), all land.

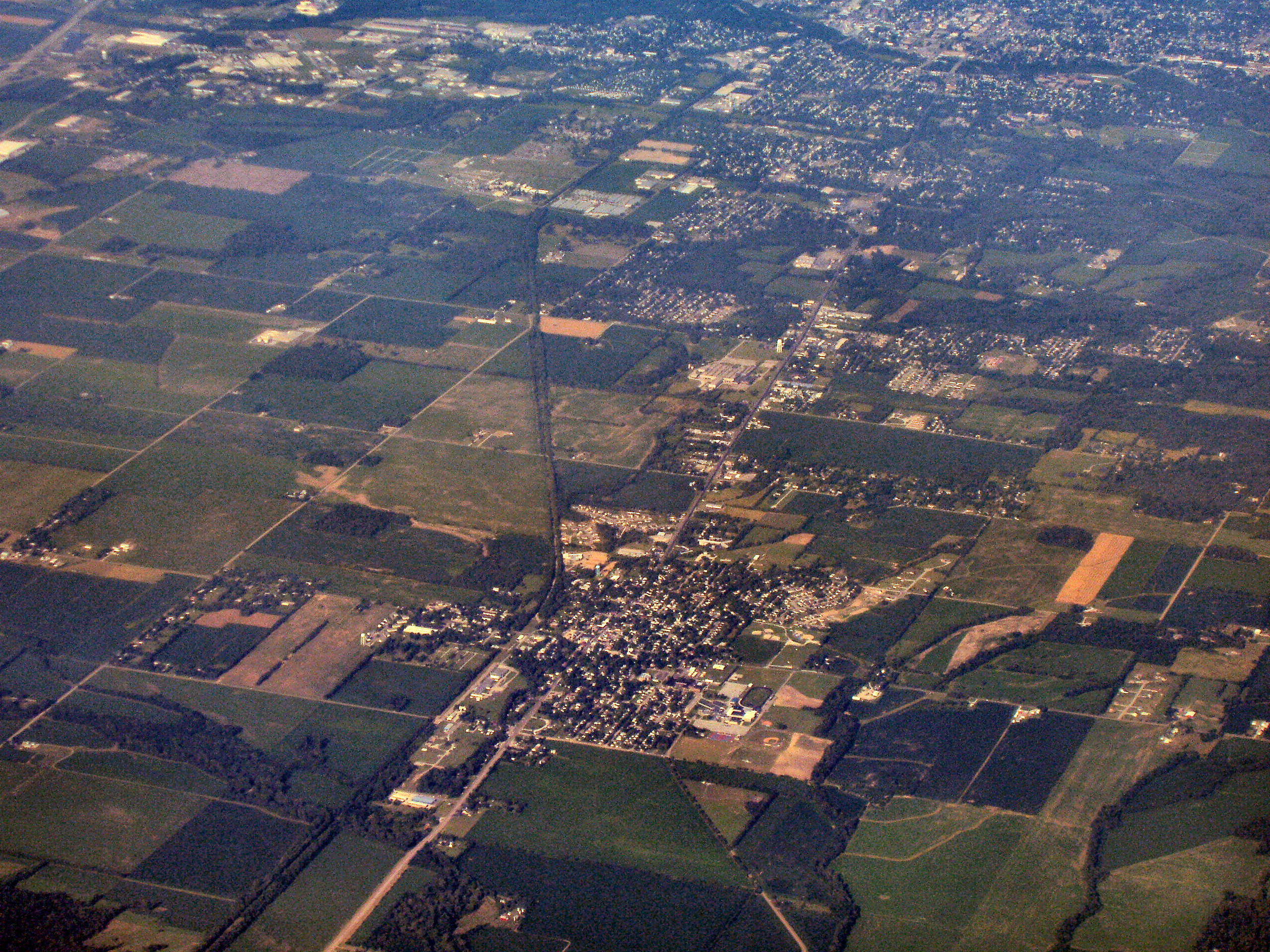
Centerville, looking east toward Richmond

== Demographics ==
Historical population
Census	Pop.	Note	%±
1850	920		—
1860	960		4.3%
1870	1,077		12.2%
1880	875		−18.8%
1890	864		−1.3%
1900	785		−9.1%
1910	1,019		29.8%
1920	917		−10.0%
1930	993		8.3%
1940	1,162		17.0%
1950	1,386		19.3%
1960	2,378		71.6%
1970	2,380		0.1%
1980	2,284		−4.0%
1990	2,398		5.0%
2000	2,427		1.2%
2010	2,552		5.2%
2020	2,748		7.7%
US Decennial Census

=== 2020 census ===
As of the 2020 census, Centerville had a population of 2,748. The median age was 38.8 years. 25.8% of residents were under the age of 18 and 18.2% of residents were 65 years of age or older. For every 100 females there were 89.0 males, and for every 100 females age 18 and over there were 88.2 males age 18 and over.

93.4% of residents lived in urban areas, while 6.6% lived in rural areas.

There were 1,081 households in Centerville, of which 34.5% had children under the age of 18 living in them. Of all households, 43.7% were married-couple households, 18.2% were households with a male householder and no spouse or partner present, and 29.2% were households with a female householder and no spouse or partner present. About 29.3% of all households were made up of individuals and 11.3% had someone living alone who was 65 years of age or older.

There were 1,188 housing units, of which 9.0% were vacant. The homeowner vacancy rate was 2.1% and the rental vacancy rate was 11.5%.

Racial composition as of the 2020 census
Race	Number	Percent
White	2,510	91.3%
Black or African American	21	0.8%
American Indian and Alaska Native	6	0.2%
Asian	26	0.9%
Native Hawaiian and Other Pacific Islander	0	0.0%
Some other race	35	1.3%
Two or more races	150	5.5%
Hispanic or Latino (of any race)	78	2.8%

=== 2010 census ===
As of the 2010 United States census, there were 2,552 people, 1,038 households, and 738 families in the town. The population density was 1,063.3 inhabitants per square mile (410.5/km^{2}). There were 1,147 housing units at an average density of 477.9 per square mile (184.5/km^{2}). The racial makeup of the town was 96.1% White, 0.6% African American, 0.1% Native American, 0.6% Asian, 1.3% from other races, and 1.2% from two or more races. Hispanic or Latino of any race were 2.5% of the population.

There were 1,038 households, of which 37.8% had children under the age of 18 living with them, 49.6% were married couples living together, 17.1% had a female householder with no husband present, 4.4% had a male householder with no wife present, and 28.9% were non-families. 26.1% of all households were made up of individuals, and 9.9% had someone living alone who was 65 years of age or older. The average household size was 2.46 and the average family size was 2.95.

The median age in the town was 37.1 years. 27.4% of residents were under the age of 18; 7.3% were between the ages of 18 and 24; 26.8% were from 25 to 44; 24.9% were from 45 to 64; and 13.5% were 65 years of age or older. The gender makeup of the town was 47.5% male and 52.5% female.

=== 2000 census ===
As of the 2000 United States census, there were 2,427 people, 944 households, and 676 families in the town. The population density was 2,421.5 inhabitants per square mile (934.9/km^{2}). There were 1,001 housing units at an average density of 998.7 per square mile 998.7 per square mile (385.6/km^{2}). The racial makeup of the town was 98.48% White, 0.21% African American, 0.04% Native American, 0.29% Asian, 0.74% from other races, and 0.25% from two or more races. Hispanic or Latino of any race were 1.07% of the population.

There were 944 households, out of which 36.7% had children under the age of 18 living with them, 52.8% were married couples living together, 15.6% had a female householder with no husband present, and 28.3% were non-families. 26.2% of all households were made up of individuals, and 11.1% had someone living alone who was 65 years of age or older. The average household size was 2.46 and the average family size was 2.95.

The town population contained 27.3% under the age of 18, 7.5% from 18 to 24, 28.8% from 25 to 44, 18.9% from 45 to 64, and 17.6% who were 65 years of age or older. The median age was 36 years. For every 100 females, there were 84.0 males. For every 100 females age 18 and over, there were 77.7 males.

The median income for a household in the town was $32,219, and the median income for a family was $37,566. Males had a median income of $31,875 versus $22,450 for females. The per capita income for the town was $15,526. About 5.3% of families and 6.7% of the population were below the poverty line, including 9.7% of those under age 18 and 3.5% of those age 65 or over.

== History ==
Centerville was platted in 1814 on land bought from the Miami Indians at the Twelve Mile Purchase. It was settled by Quakers originally from Centreville, Delaware. Centre Monthly Meeting in Delaware is part of Baltimore Yearly Meeting of the Society of Friends, whose Indian relations office first sent a delegation of Quakers to Indiana Territory at the request of Chief Little Turtle of the Miami Indians, who visited them in Baltimore. Friends from Delaware lived for a time in Guilford County, North Carolina before permanently moving to Indiana Territory when it opened for settlement. The community is said to be named for its location near the middle of the county, but it is not in the center. A little-known county seat war was fought in Wayne County in 1873 between Centerville and Richmond. The county seat had been located in Centerville (Center Township) since 1818. By 1870, Richmond (Wayne Township) had surpassed Centerville in business, population, and tax revenue. These factors led the population of Wayne Township to demand the county seat be moved to Richmond. The dispute was played out in the newspapers, courts, and petitions, with Richmond the eventual winner. A new courthouse was erected in Richmond and preparations were made to move records from Centerville to Richmond. Centerville residents twice stopped Richmond's officials’ efforts to move the records, first with guarded locked gates, then by firing on their own courthouse with a three-pound cannon nicknamed “Black Betty.” The cannon was used when Richmond guards were brought in to protect the records. The cannon had been loaded with iron scraps. A crowd demanded the guard come out of the Centerville courthouse. When they refused, the cannon was fired, the door blown off its hinges, and the guards were forced to beat a hasty retreat. Soldiers were brought in the next day to move the records to Richmond. Centerville's tenure as county seat had come to an end. The holes from the cannon shot are still visible over the door of the old courthouse, now the Center Township Library.

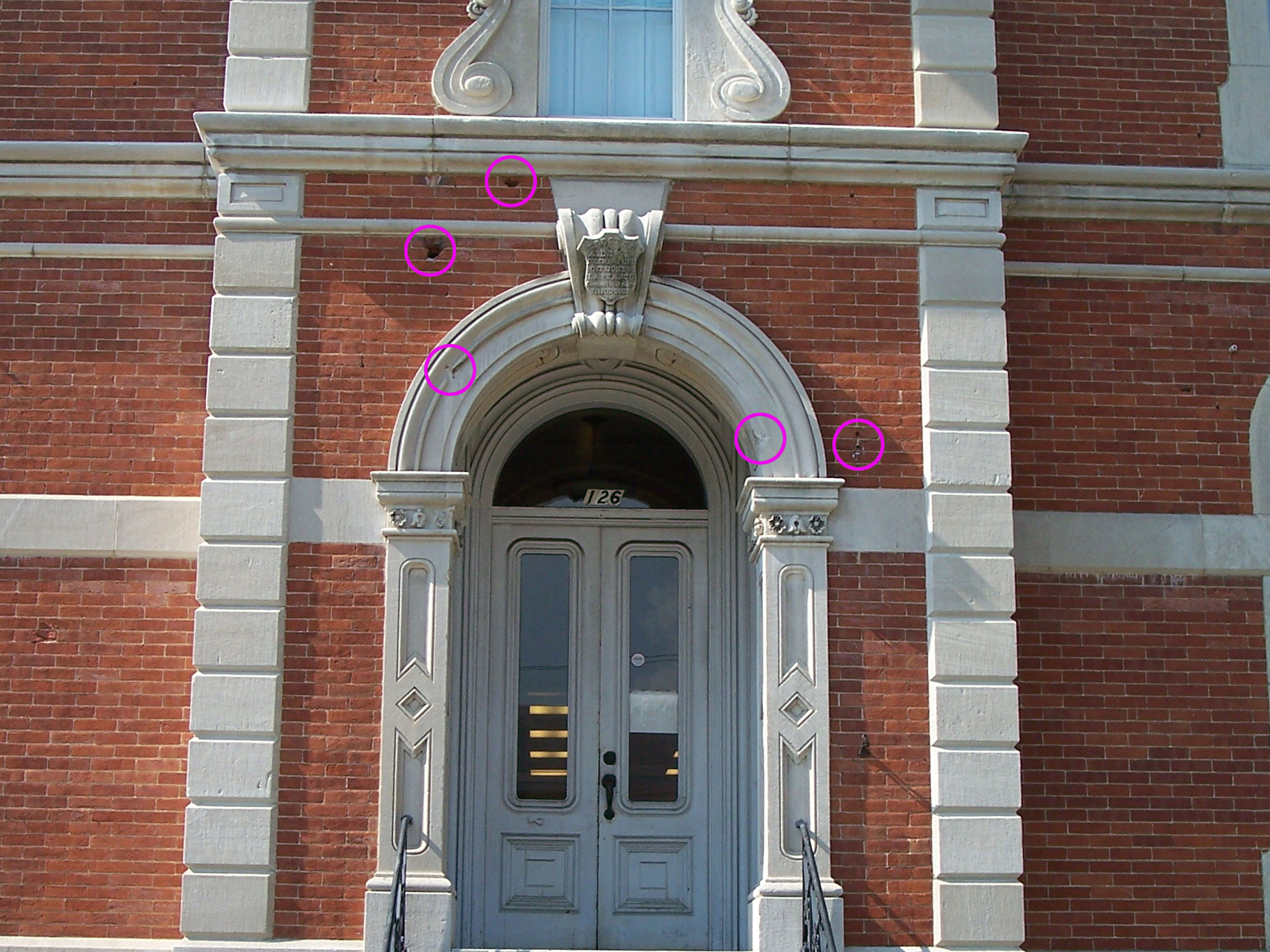
Center Township Library, showing cannonade marks

The Centerville post office has been in operation since 1818.

In 1828 the National Road, which ran along Centerville's Main Street, was surveyed. It later became the first improved section of the trail in 1850 by a Special Act of Congress.

Centerville's cobblestone street was a major stop along the trail to the West. During the height of the Gold Rush, 49,000 wagons would travel along the street each year.

Centerville is known as the “City of Arches” due to the five main arches on the Old National Road. The original road was 100 feet (30.5 m) wide, but was reduced to 65 feet (19.8 m) after several buildings in the town had encroached into the roadway. The arches were used as a way to get behind the buildings and into the backyards of the houses. The five arches in Centerville are the Backenstoes, Dill, Shortridge, Lantz, and Malone Archways, all built between 1823 and 1836. In August, Centerville has Archway Days, held to celebrate the historical archways.

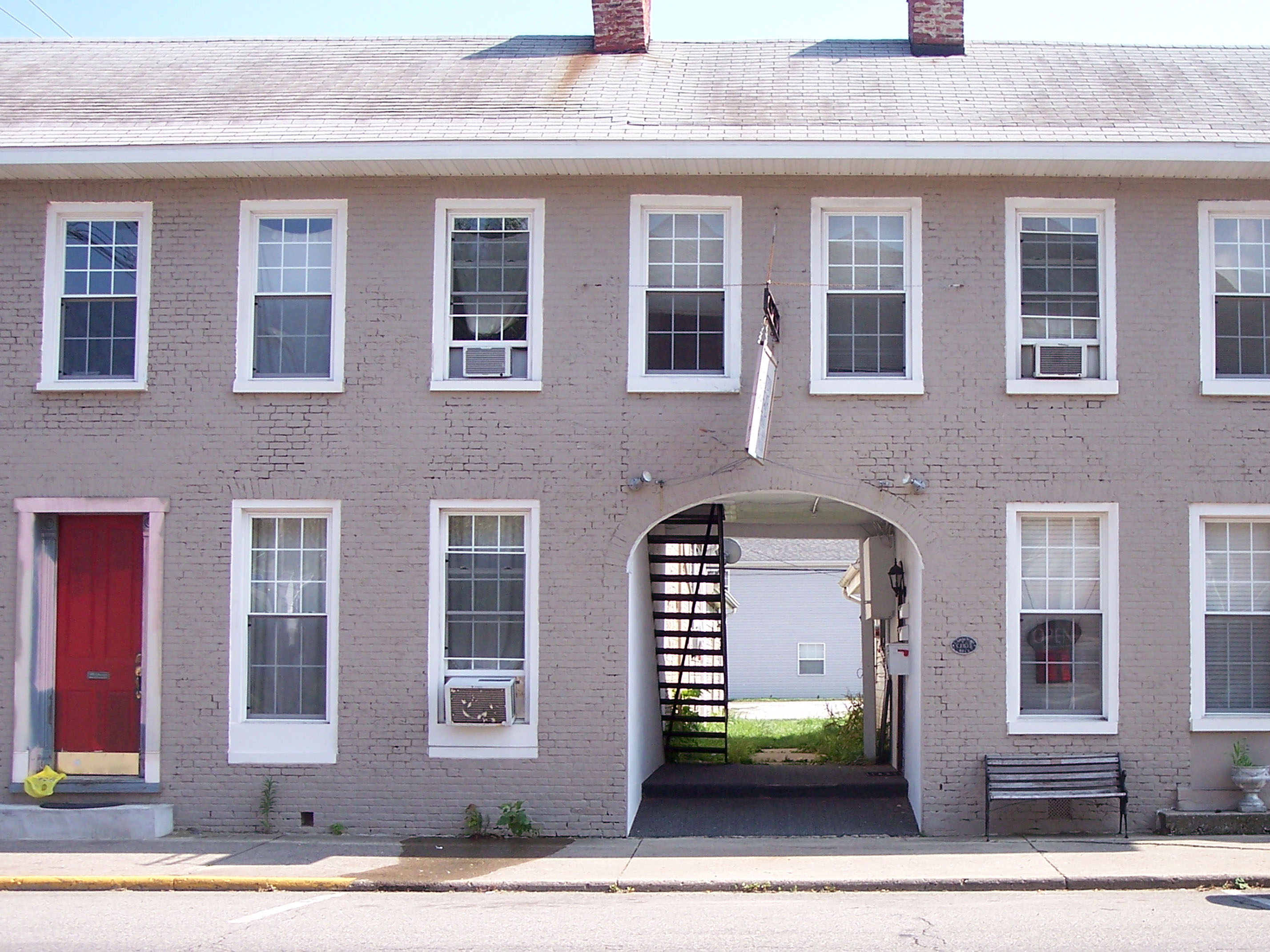
Backenstoes Archway

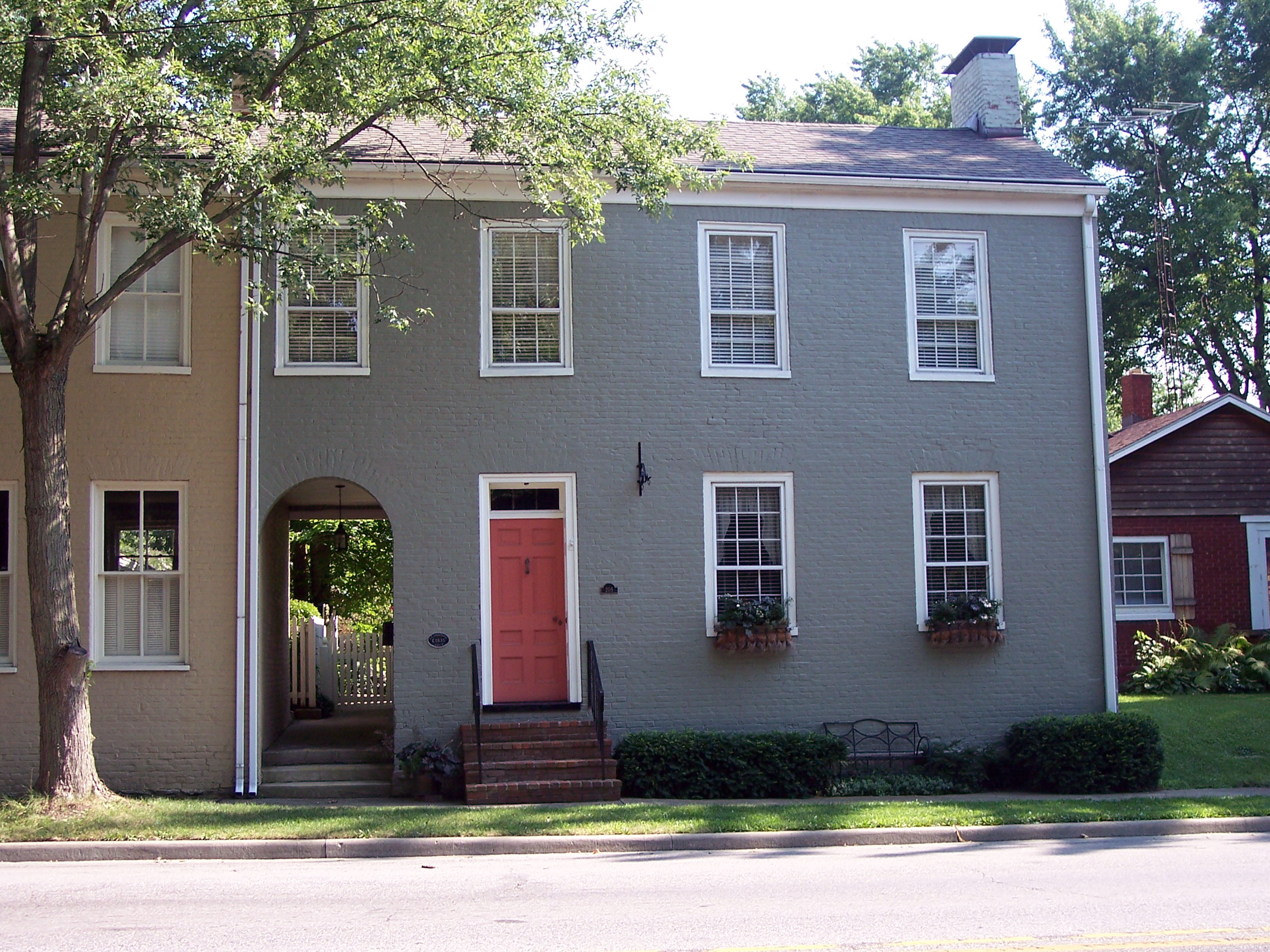
Shortridge Archway

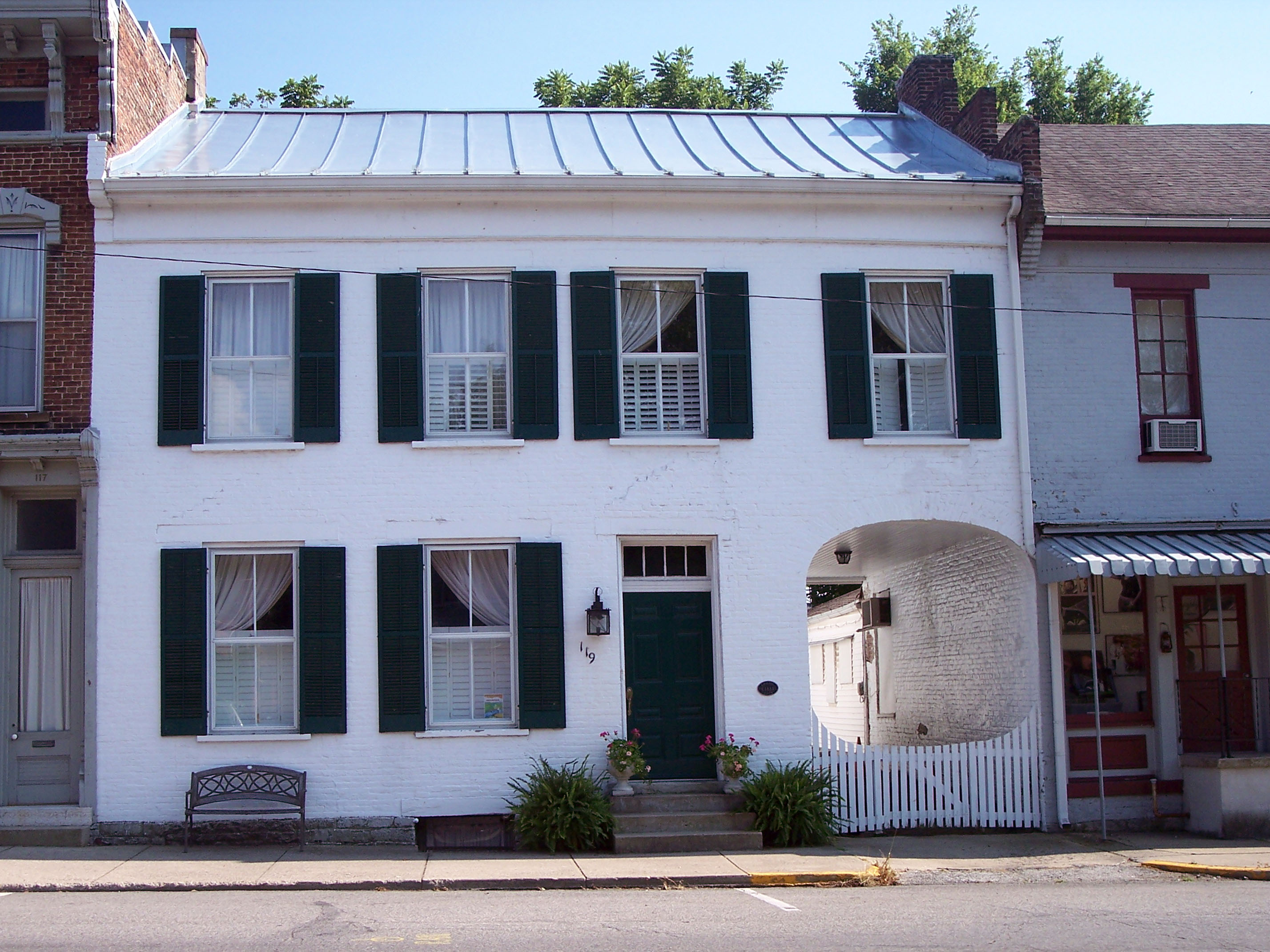
Malone Archway

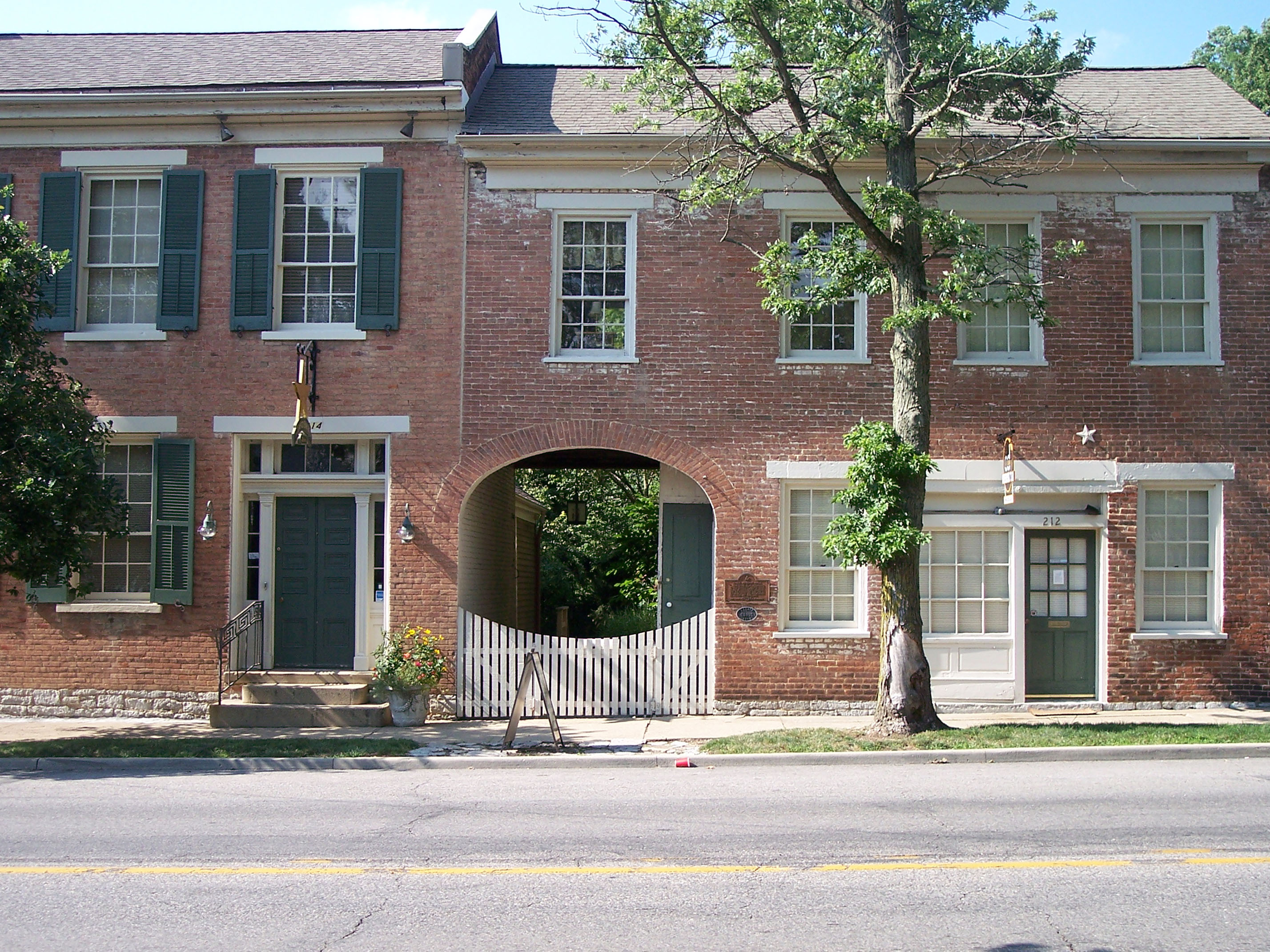
Lantz Archway

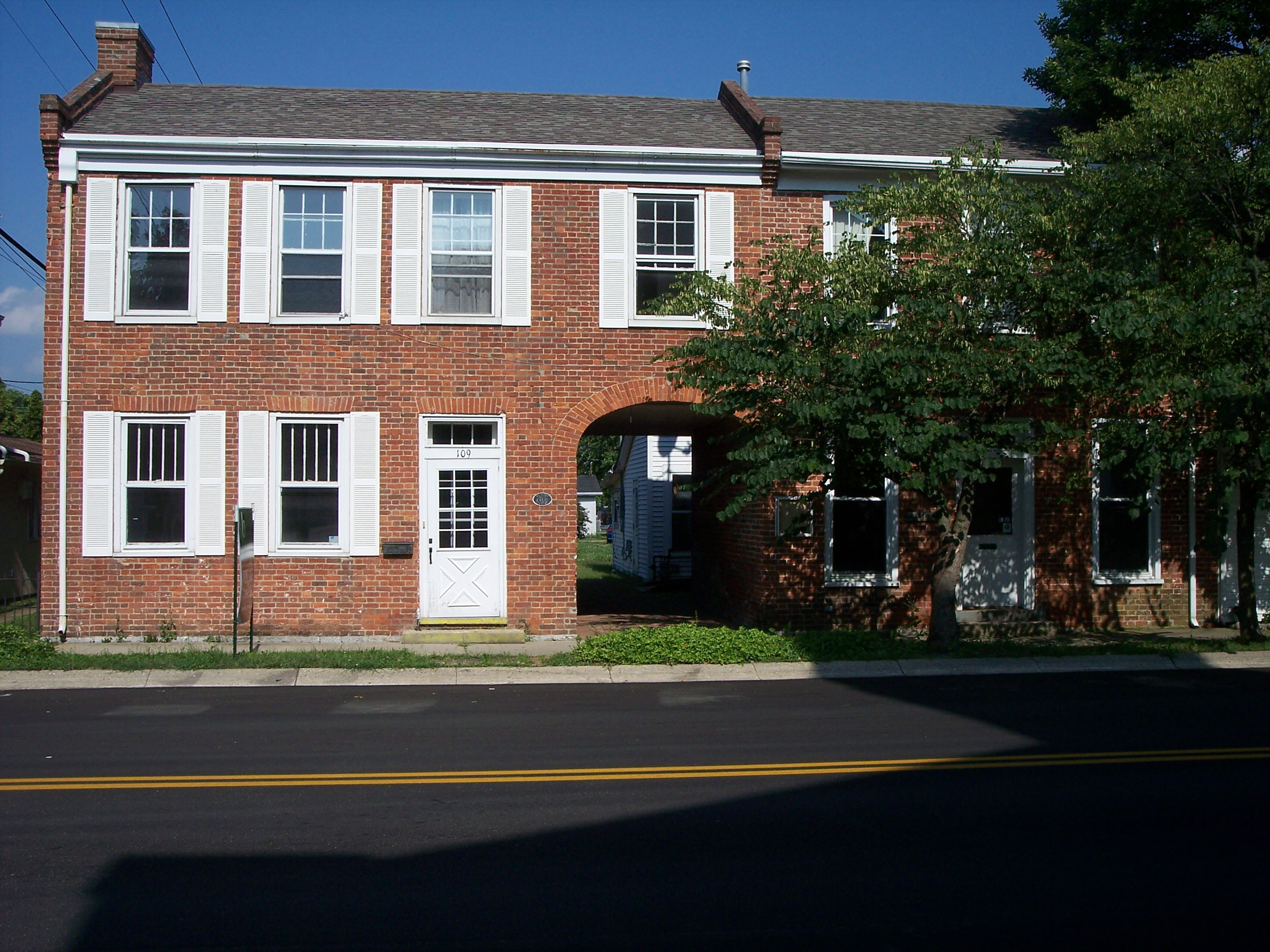
Dill Archway

The Centerville Historic District (Centerville, Indiana), Oliver P. Morton House, and Westcott Stock Farm are listed on the National Register of Historic Places.

== Education ==
Centerville has one secondary school, Centerville Senior High School, and one library, Centerville-Center Township Public Library.

== Notable people ==
- John A. Burbank (1827−1905), Governor of Dakota Territory
- Barry Jones (1963− ), pitcher in Major League Baseball
- George Washington Julian (1817−1899), state and U.S. Representative
- Joseph Henry Kibbey (1853−1924), Governor of the Arizona Territory
- Oliver Hazard Perry Morton (1823−1877), Governor of Indiana and U.S. Senator from Indiana
- Harriet Noble (1851–1919), academic and suffragist
