= Underground Railroad in Indiana =

Organization aiding runaway slaves

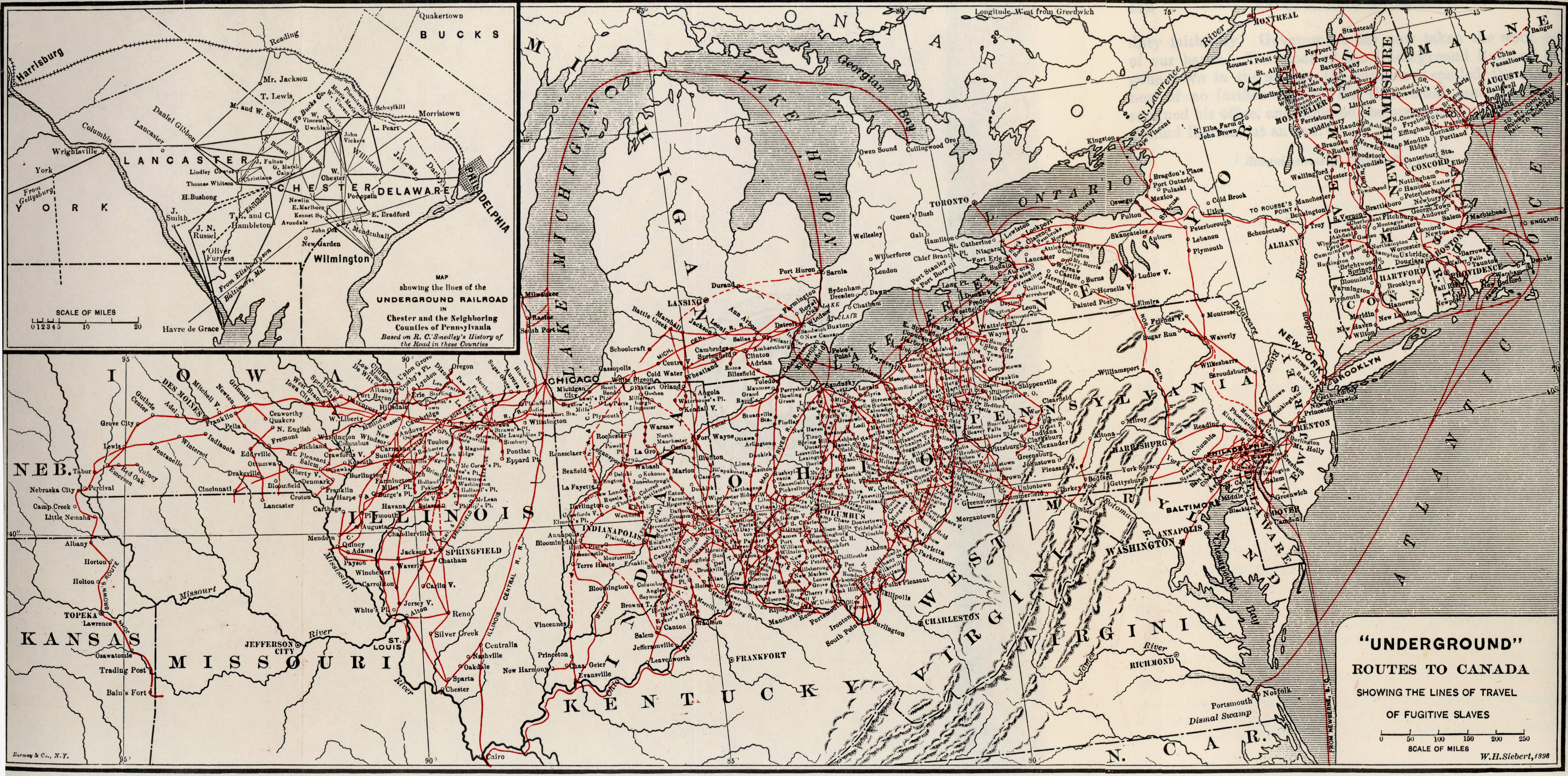
Map of some Underground Railroad routes

The Underground Railroad in Indiana was part of a larger, unofficial, and loosely-connected network of groups and individuals who aided and facilitated the escape of runaway slaves from the southern United States. The network in Indiana gradually evolved in the 1830s and 1840s, reached its peak during the 1850s, and continued until slavery was abolished throughout the United States at the end of the American Civil War in 1865. It is not known how many fugitive slaves escaped through Indiana on their journey to Michigan and Canada. An unknown number of Indiana's abolitionists, anti-slavery advocates, and people of color, as well as Quakers and other religious groups illegally operated stations (safe houses) along the network. Some of the network's operatives have been identified, including Levi Coffin, the best-known of Indiana's Underground Railroad leaders. In addition to shelter, network agents provided food, guidance, and, in some cases, transportation to aid the runaways.

Most of the fugitives who entered Indiana followed one of three general routes after crossing the Ohio River from Kentucky. A western route, which typically began in Indiana's southwestern counties near Evansville, continued north along the Wabash River or through several of the state's western counties toward the Indiana-Michigan border. A central route from Indiana counties began after crossing the Ohio River from the Louisville, Kentucky, area and passed through central and northern Indiana before entering Michigan. An eastern route from southeastern Indiana counties followed stations along the Indiana-Ohio border. A smaller number of fugitive slaves entered Indiana from Cincinnati, Ohio. Today, only a few Underground Railroad sites in Indiana are open to the public, including the Catherine and Levi Coffin home (called the "Grand Central Station of the Underground Railroad") in Wayne County and Eleutherian College in Jefferson County. Other sites have been identified with state historic markers, an ongoing effort.

== History ==
Despite the risks of being captured and sold into bondage, some free people of color illegally provided aid to fugitive slaves in the early years of the Underground Railroad's operations. As more fugitive slaves came into Indiana in the 1820s, a growing number of white abolitionists and antislavery advocates took part the network, especially after 1850, when federal fugitive laws made it more difficult for runaways to make their escape to Canada. The Underground Railroad gradually evolved in the 1830s and 1840s, reaching its peak during the 1850s, and remained in operation until 1865, when slavery was abolished throughout the United States at the end of the American Civil War.

=== Prior to 1816 ===
Although slavery was prohibited within the Northwest Territory and the Indiana Territory prior to Indiana's statehood in 1816, early residents disagreed on whether slavery should be allowed in the territory. In addition, federal and territorial laws did not prevent residents from enslaving others through indentured servitude.

The proslavery faction of the territorial government adopted legislation in 1803 that allowed involuntary servitude to circumvent Article VI of the Northwest Ordinance of 1787 that prohibited slavery. Passage of an indenture act in 1805 also allowed slaveholders to bring slaves purchased outside the territory into Indiana and bind them into service as indentured servants. In addition, passage of the Fugitive Slave Act of 1793 and the Fugitive Slave Act of 1850 enforced slaveholders' rights to pursue, retrieve, and return African Americans to bondage in the South. Those who provided aid to fugitives or interfered with their capture were subject to fines and prison terms.

In the early 1800s, early leaders of the antislavery movement in the Indiana Territory included Quaker settlers living in the eastern part of movement, the antislavery faction became the dominant political group. In 1810, antislavery politicians had gained sufficient influence to repeal the 1803 and 1805 laws that supported slavery in the territory.

=== First decades after statehood ===
When Indiana became a state in 1816, antislavery supporters were successful in getting the delegates at the state constitutional convention to officially abolish slavery and involuntary servitude under the new state's constitution. Although free people of color who lived in the Indiana did not have the same legal rights as other residents, by the time that it became a state, Indiana along with Ohio and the adjacent territories (Illinois Territory and Michigan Territory) were beginning to be known as refuges for runaway slaves.

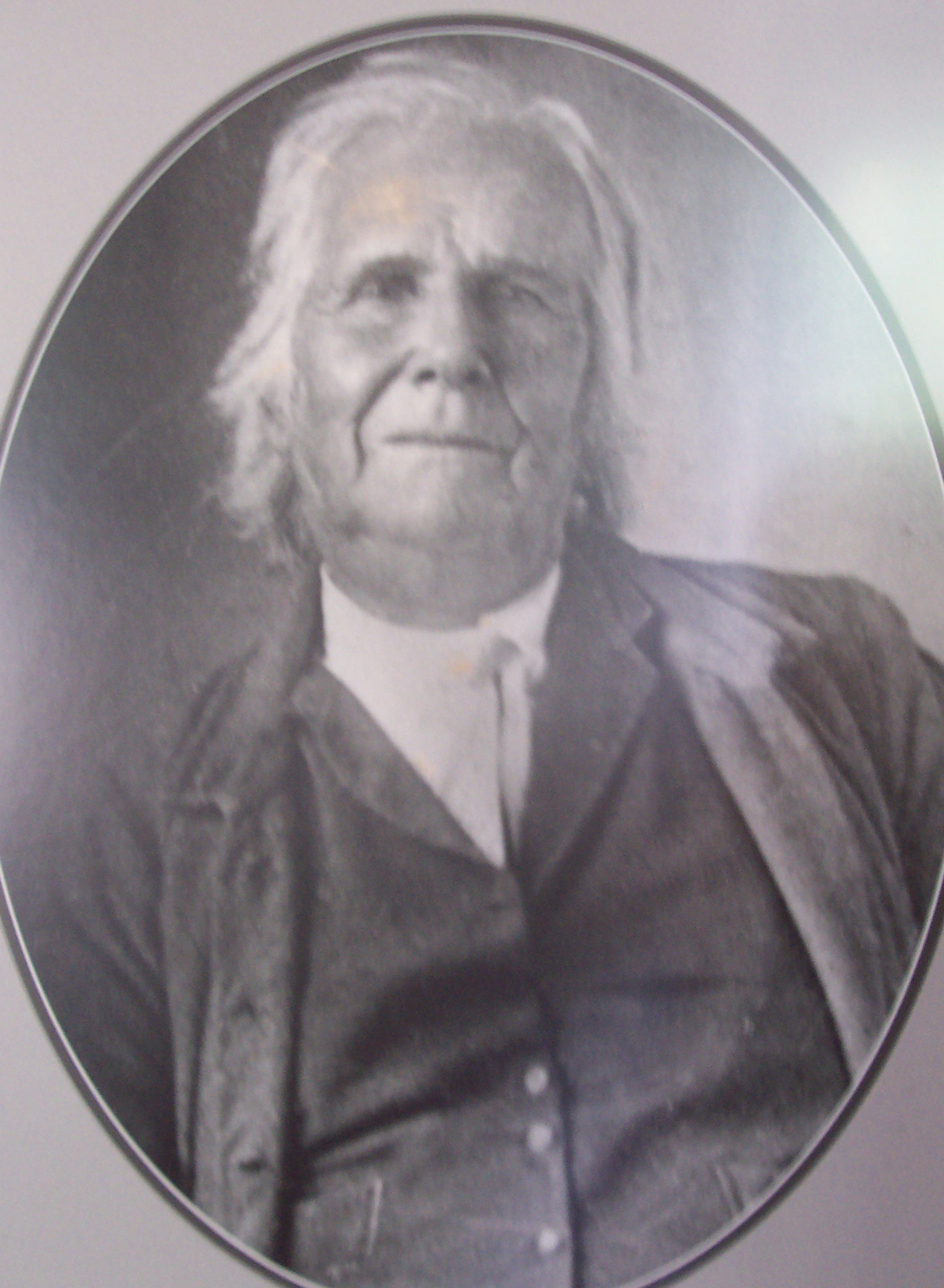
Early abolitionist leader Dennis Pennington

The Indiana General Assembly passed "man-stealing laws" in 1816 with additional legislation passed in 1818 to prevent bounty hunters and slavecatchers from abducting and forcibly removing any person from the state without first before a judge or justice of the peace for a hearing. Indiana's "man-stealing" legislation soon brought the state into conflict with Kentucky, its neighboring slave state. In November 1818, Indiana state senator Dennis Pennington brought suit in the Harrison County, Indiana, Circuit Court against three Kentucky men under the state's man-stealing laws. Pennington charged that the three men had illegally captured a woman of color named Susan in Corydon, Indiana, and had forcibly taken her to Kentucky. Jonathan Jennings, the governor of Indiana, tried to have the men extradited to Indiana for trial, but Gabriel Slaughter, the governor of Kentucky, declined on constitutional grounds.

In border states such as Indiana, some individuals supported slavery while others opposed it or had neutral opinions about the issue and did not take any action. Despite the disagreements within his own state, Indiana's U.S. Senator Noah Noble, who was elected governor of Indiana in 1831, supported the antislavery sentiment by voting against granting statehood to Missouri in 1820 because of its proslavery stance. (The law slavery debate continued in Congress, but Missouri gained its statehood as part of the Missouri Compromise.)

In the decades leading up to the Civil War, some individuals became abolitionists who sought an end to slavery through legal means; others became involved in the Underground Railroad and actively aided runaway slaves. Antislavery groups were not in agreement on how they should respond. Some individuals joined antislavery societies forming in the non-slaveholding states, including Indiana, to assist runaway slaves.

=== Federal fugitive slave laws ===
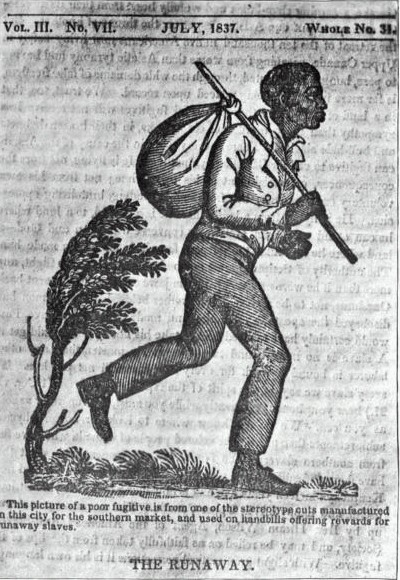
A common image used in runaway slave ads.

The Fugitive Slave Act of 1850 reinforced prior fugitive slave laws dating from 1793 and protected the rights of slaveholders, as well as the slavecatchers who came into Indiana to capture runaways. These laws also punished those who participated in Underground Railroad activities, causing much of their assistance to be conducted in greater secrecy. In addition, enforcement of the federal fugitive slave laws made it riskier for fugitives and free people of color who aided them to remain in Indiana. Free people of color were also more vulnerable to harassment and kidnapping, especially those living in counties along the Ohio River.

Bounty hunters (slavecatchers), mostly operating in the southern part of the state, offered their services and knowledge of the area to southerners searching for runaways. In addition, free blacks could become victims when slavecatchers could not find runaway slaves. Bounty hunters and slavecatchers might seize free blacks, claiming them to be runaways, and bring them to the Southern United States to be sold into bondage. In one incident in the early 1850s, for example, slavecatchers seized two free blacks working on the Wabash and Erie Canal. Although local abolitionists quickly organized and petitioned the sheriff to release the two men, the slavecatchers had documents that described the men and claimed they were runaways. Evidence suggested the documents were false, but there was no way to refute the claim. The slavecatchers were allowed to take the two men as their prisoners, but before they left Indiana a group of abolitionists overtook the party and freed the two black laborers.

=== State laws impacting African American migration ===
Indiana's state constitution prohibited slavery, but many Indiana residents supported legislation that prevented runaway slaves from entering the state. In 1851, when the Constitution of Indiana was revised, delegates to the constitutional convention considered granting voting rights to Indiana's free people of color. At that time, slave states were expelling free people of color and emancipated slaves in the hope that they would migrate to free states. Many residents of free states, including Indiana's citizens feared the impact of a rising population of free African Americans and wanted to keep these migrants out of the state. The majority of the convention delegates, hoping to ease tensions between the states and prevent further violence between the pro-slavery and anti-slavery factions, thought that the only appropriate solution was to include a clause in the state constitution that prohibited African Americans from immigrating to Indiana. The state's voters adopted Article XIII, Section 1, of the new constitution banning blacks and mulattos from entering the state; it remained in effect until the state constitution was amended in 1881.

=== Underground supporters ===
The slave catchers' aggressive tactics and the sight of runaways being returned to bondage in the South gradually impacted the state's population. By 1851, popular opinion was shifting from indifference to slavery toward increasingly antislavery sentiments. The result was more widespread involvement in the Underground Railroad and an increase in general support for hampering the slave catchers' efforts.

People of color, antislavery advocates, vigilance groups, abolitionists, and religious groups who opposed slavery were involved in the illegal network to help runaways. Although Indiana's free African American population was small (less than 1 percent of the state's overall population), most of the individuals who aided the fugitives along the state's southern border, especially at Madison, Indiana, were people of color. Some free blacks living in central and northern Indiana also aided runaways. In addition to Indiana's free-black community and some abolitionists, other early supporters of the Underground Railroad were Quakers living the state's eastern counties.

Not all abolitionists and members of antislavery groups approved of the underground network's radical activities, which were illegal, dangerous, and carried out in secrecy. While many Quakers supported the Underground Railroad, some opposed these efforts, viewing them as extremist. Other Indiana residents, even those who opposed slavery, disapproved of the secret network's illegal methods.

Because of the consequences if they were caught (monetary fines, imprisonment, public harassment, etc.), unknown numbers of people living in Indiana participated in the Underground Railroad. In some Indiana communities, dozens were involved; in others, it may have only been a single person, but the Underground Railroad was not an organized nationwide network. Membership in abolitionist groups or antislavery societies did not also mean they were Underground Railroad activists. For example, prominent Indiana abolitionist Stephen S. Harding, a lawyer in Ripley County, Indiana, who later became the territorial governor of Utah and chief justice of the Colorado Territory's Supreme Court in the 1860s, was outspoken in his views against slavery, but the alleged use of his home in Milan, Indiana, as a safehouse for fugitive slaves has not been confirmed.

== Operation ==
The Underground Railroad was an informal and illegal operation in the movement of fugitive slaves from the South to freedom in the North and in Canada. The effort, which continued until the end of the Civil War in 1865, involved individuals or groups who worked together in secrecy to give directions or provide food, clothing, shelter, and transportation to assist runaway slaves as they moved from one safe place to another to avoid capture. The underground network also incorporated railroad-related terms to refer to various aspects of this clandestine work such as routes, stations or depots (safe havens), conductors (guides), agents or stationmasters (property owners of the safehouses or their assistants), and passengers and cargoes (fugitives).

Escaped slaves, even after they reached Indiana, were still enslaved from a legal perspective and could be captured and returned to slavery. In order to keep the fugitives safe, Underground Railroad members formed a loosely-organized network of stations (safe places to stay) around the state. Conductors and their associates provided food and shelter in barns, private homes, churches, and even caves and coal mines. Escaped slaves traveled in small groups, typically less than ten people, to stations at distances of 10-mile (16 km) to 20 miles (32 km) apart, the range that a small group could cover safely at night.

In order to keep the runaways safe, and to protect the identities of those who provided aid, as few people as possible knew about the hiding places for runaways. Men were usually involved in transporting them from station to station, but women took fugitives into their homes, nursed the sick, and provided food, clothing, and shelter. Those active in the network are not all known by name and little is known of their secret activities. Conductors did not know all the stations or their associates along the routes. The participants' friends and neighbors may not have known of their involvement, or if they were suspicious, may have remained silent.

=== Operations in Jefferson County, Indiana ===
Jefferson County in Indiana was an important layover point in the Underground Railroad because of its proximity to the Ohio River and Kentucky, a slave state. Its proximity facilitated it as a midpoint of origin for slaves traveling north. The county formed an interracial community of white and Black citizens who worked together to provide shelter, guidance, and protection to runaways.

Local citizens comprised the Quakers, free blacks, and residents of other faiths like Baptists, Presbyterians, Methodists, and Quakers who used homes, farms, and churches as sanctuaries. Despite pro-slavery sentiments and the threat of the Fugitive Slave Act of 1850, Jefferson County residents persisted in covert activities to aid runaways.

Noted individuals were George DeBaptiste, a Black barber in the Georgetown part of Madison, who helped runaways and once led a sheriff's posse astray to protect a fugitive. Chapman Harris, a Black minister, and Elijah Anderson, a blacksmith, also stood out. The John Todd House, built in 1838 along the Ohio River shoreline near Clifty Falls, was a prominent first stop on the Indiana side of the river. White abolitionist and ex-justice of the Indiana Supreme Court, Stephen C. Stevens, provided legal aid to those accused under fugitive slave law. Even antislavery societies such as Neil's Creek Anti-Slavery Society and schools such as Eleutherin College aided the movement.

These were highly organized at the local level and benefited immensely due to secrecy and interracial cooperation, especially testifying to the enormous contribution of Jefferson County to the Underground Railroad.

== Routes ==
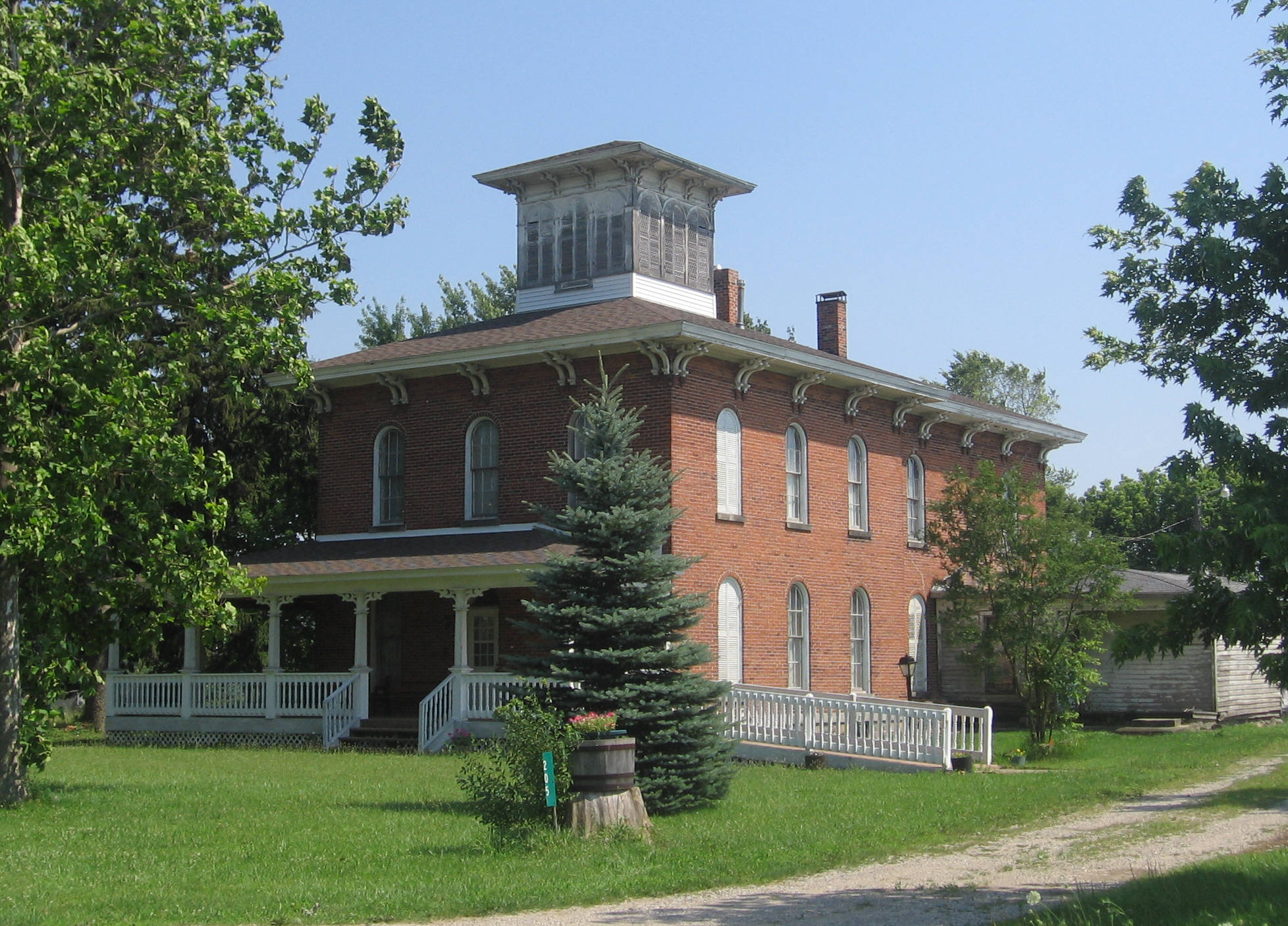
The Erastus Farnham House (ca. 1849) south of Fremont, Indiana, just a few miles south of the Michigan border, was a final stop on the Underground Railroad in Indiana. Its cupola served as a lookout point and a cistern provided water without having to leave the house.

Indiana was a likely place for runaways to escape because of its geographical location as a free state that bordered Kentucky, a slave state. Indiana's southern boundary, directly across the Ohio River from Kentucky, had several crossing points and various routes for runaways to follow north to reach Detroit, Michigan. From Michigan, fugitives could cross the Detroit River and find refuge in Ontario, Canada.

Most runaway slaves who entered Indiana followed one of three general routes after crossing the Ohio River. Southern Indiana communities such as Evansville, Rockport, New Albany, Jeffersonville, and Madison, as well as free black communities that included the Georgetown neighborhood of Madison in Jefferson County, Lick Creek in Orange County and Lyles Station in Gibson County, provided aid to runaways. A smaller number of fugitive slaves entered Indiana from Cincinnati, Ohio. Due to the multiple entry points, Indiana's network of routes was complex, loosely organized, and intersected at various locations. Aid to the fugitives was sporadic and in some areas of Indiana the network was not active at all. Underground Railroad stations offering safe places to stay also changed over time to maintain secrecy and safety. If routes or stations became known to bounty hunters and slaveowners who ventured north to capture runaways, alternate sites could be used.

Agents operating south of the Ohio River guided the runaways to safety in the North or give then instructions for finding help after crossing the river. A few people, including some employed by antislavery groups, quietly fished along the river waiting for fugitive slaves to arrive. On some occasions, Indiana agents of the Underground Railroad working with associates in Kentucky used visual signals such as bonfires before ferrying fugitives across the river. Small skiffs (boats) and private ferries hidden on the south shore of the river secretly transported the fugitives, usually at night. Agents of the underground network near the river also helped runaways slaves find their first hiding places in Indiana. Commercial ferries crossing the Ohio River also provided means for fugitives to escape from Kentucky to Indiana. Beginning in the 1850s and continuing into the 1860s, some fugitives boarded trains such as the New Albany-Salem Railroad traveling north to Indianapolis.

At Underground Railroad stations (safe havens) the fugitive slaves were provided with meals, clothing, and shelter. The runaways remained in hiding until slavecatchers and bounty hunters in the area moved elsewhere or gave up their search. Escaped slaves often found refuge near Quaker communities and in rural African American communities as they traveled north. Indiana's network was less organized than Ohio's routes. White abolitionists and free blacks worked together in Indiana, as well as separately. Routes beginning at New Albany and Madison had the most traffic. Escaping slaves continued their journey north from station to station, usually traveling on foot at night or hidden in wagons. Most escaped slaves eventually made it to northern Indiana, where they crossed the state's border into Michigan. Their final destination in the United States was usually Detroit, Michigan, or Toledo, Ohio, where boats could ferry them a short distance to Canada. Although runaway slaves were not officially granted asylum in Canada, extradition requests from U.S. authorities were rarely granted, allowing the fugitives to live the remainder of their lives in freedom.

Not all fugitive slaves passing through Indiana actually migrated to Canada. Indiana had several communities of free people of color and river towns with African American communities that helped to protect runaways and provide a safe place to live, or at least temporary shelter. Most of the African American settlements in Indiana's northern counties were established along an Underground Railroad route, where runaways could, and some actually did, become residents. For example, African American runaways John Rhodes (or Roads) and his wife, Rhuann Maria, along with their young child escaped in Missouri and passed through the Westfield, Indiana, area on their journey north. Instead of continuing, they decided to remain in the vicinity of nearby Deming. The family remained safe for several years until Singleton Vaughn arrived to claim them. The Rhodes family resisted capture and, with assistance from the local Quaker community and their neighbors, successfully escaped. Vaughn brought suit against those who provided aid to the fugitives (Vaughn v. William), which cost the group $600 in attorney's fees, but the family was not recaptured.

=== Eastern route ===
After secretly crossing the Ohio River on ferries from Trimble or Carroll Counties in Kentucky to either Cincinnati or Ripley, Ohio, runaway slaves following the eastern route typically came through Madison, a major center for the Underground Railroad in Indiana. From Madison, the eastern route went north to stations along the Indiana-Ohio border, including Newport in Wayne County, Indiana, where Levi Coffin, one of the primary organizers of the network lived for some time. A branch of the eastern route passed into Ohio, but the main route continued north from Newport through Winchester, Portland, Decatur, Fort Wayne, and Auburn, Indiana, before continuing into Michigan. Quaker families in settlements known for their antislavery activity in Wayne, Randolph and Henry Counties also provided aid to fugitives. Another branch from southeast Indiana went through Columbus, Indiana, a point of convergence with the central Indiana route.

==== Agents near Madison, Indiana ====
In Madison, Indiana, the free black community was especially active in the Underground Railroad from 1836 until 1846, when a race riot in Madison made it unsafe for its free black leaders to remain there. Chapman Harris, a free African American, was a member of the underground network by the 1830s. His family's cabin, about 3 miles (4.8 km) from Madison, was a safe house for fugitives who crossed the Ohio River. Harris's associate, Elijah Anderson, a free-born African American whose cabin was also a station, helped ferry fugitives across the river. Anderson came to Madison in 1837 and guided as many as 800 fugitives before he was eventually arrested and convicted in Kentucky for his efforts. Anderson served four years of an eight-year sentence at the state penitentiary at Frankfort, Kentucky, before his death in 1861. George DeBaptiste a free black who moved to Madison in 1838, was a barber and businessman, as well as a conductor on the Underground Railroad. DeBaptiste crossed the river into Kentucky to guide runaways and is believed to have helped more than 300 fugitive slaves. His barbershop in Madison was a center of Underground Railroad activity along the eastern route in the 1830s and 1840sbut due to his active involvement in the underground network, it became unsafe for DeBaptiste to remain in Madison. He moved to Detroit, Michigan, around 1846. Other African American agents of the underground network in Madison included John Lott, Henry Thornton, and Griffith Booth, among others. Lott worked with Harris to organize the free blacks in the area; Thornton later served in the Union army during the Civil War before his death in 1892; and Booth later moved to Kalamazoo, Michigan.

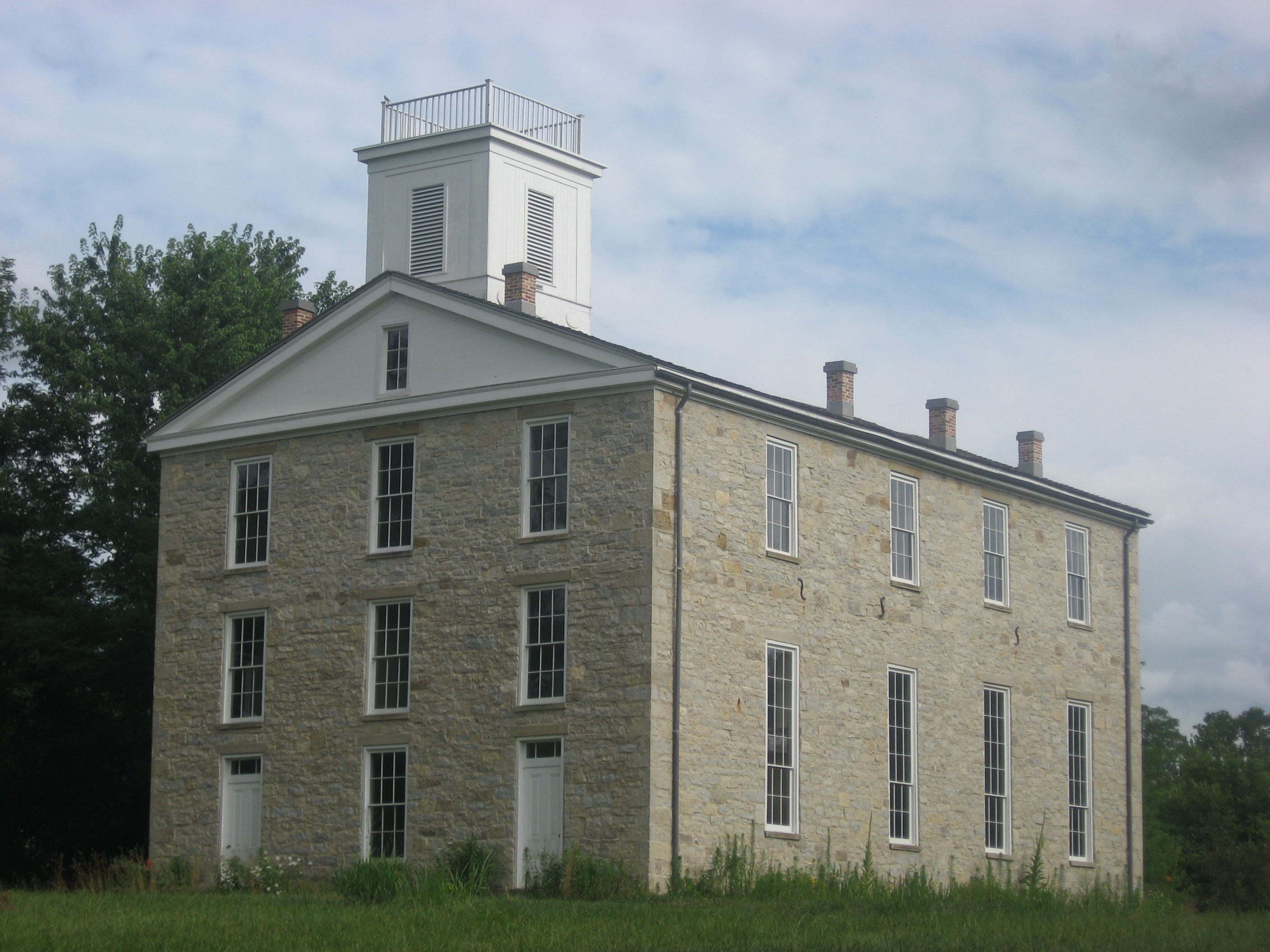
Eleutherian College

Antislavery whites in the Madison area were also involved in aiding fugitive slaves. The Neil's Creek Anti-Slavery Society in rural Jefferson County, Indiana, for example, had more than eighty families involved in support of the Underground Railroad near Eleutherian College. Area leaders included the families of Lyman Hoyt, Benajah Hoyt, James Tibbetts, and John Hays, among others. More than nine of society members' homes were used as safe houses for the underground network. Farther north, Arvine C. Quier, an Ohio native who moved to Indiana in 1852, was among the conductors who assisted fugitive slaves escape through Jennings County, Indiana, a stopover for runaways journeying north from Madison, and others following the central route from the New Albany, Indiana, area. Quier owned a sawmill near Butlerville, and his wife, Mary (Michener) Quier, cared for fugitive slaves in their home before he transported them to the next station.

==== Newport, Indiana, agents ====
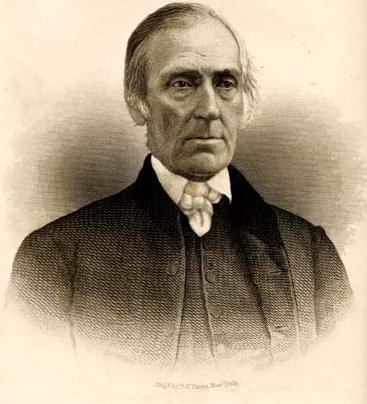
Quaker abolitionist Levi Coffin

Levi Coffin, a Quaker and one of the most famous abolitionists in Indiana, operated a station out of his rural home at Newport (present-day Fountain City). Coffin, who is sometimes referred to as the president of the Underground Railroad, made no secret of his activities as an Underground Railroad conductor, although many of his fellow Quakers thought his actions too radical. The Levi and Catherine Coffin home at Newport has been called the "Grand Central Station of the Underground Railroad" along the route between Cincinnati, Ohio, and Canada. Between 1826 and 1846, more than 2,000 escaped slaves reportedly stopped there for aid. Among the fugitives that the Coffins assisted was William Bush, who remained in Newport and became a blacksmith, as well as an Underground Railroad conductor. In addition to Bush, several also African American men in the Newport area, including "William Davidson, Douglas White, James Benson, and Cal Thomas" assisted runaway slaves reach safety in the north.

At Newport, about 8 miles (13 km) north of Richmond, in Wayne County, Indiana, other area residents provided aid to fugitive slaves, most of them anonymously. Newport Quakers and free-black communities in the area worked together as well as separately in their efforts. Informers in the Newport area were made to feel unwelcome, and most, but not all moved elsewhere. Local women in Newport formed a sewing group to assemble clothing for the runaways and raised funds to purchase what was needed by selling some of their handmade goods. When bounty hunters or slave owners were not pursuing them, some escaped slaves found work in Newport among the community's free black residents. At Cabin Creek, a free-black community near Newport, runaways stayed in the home of John Bond and other homes scattered in the area. Spartanburg was another free black community in the area that provided aid. Spartanburg resident Lewis Talbert made multiple trips to the South to guide runaways to freedom. Although he was captured and escaped, it not known how long he survived.

=== Central routes ===
After crossing the Ohio River from major crossing points in the Louisville, Kentucky, area, the central Indiana route began at New Albany, Jeffersonville, and Clarksville, or possibly at Madison or the vicinity of Leavenworth, Indiana. From these arrival points, the route continued to Corydon and Columbus, Indiana. Some fugitives, after crossing the river into Indiana, went to an African American settlement known as Greenbrier, near Hanover, Indiana, before moving to stations in Jennings and Decatur Counties. Branches of the central route converged near Columbus and continued north to Indianapolis, Westfield, Logansport, Plymouth, and South Bend, Indiana, before passing into Michigan. Others active in the movement in central Indiana included several members of the Westfield, a community founded by Quakers in Hamilton County, as well as others from nearby Deming. Westfield also became a key station of the Underground Railroad in central Indiana as a point where several routes converged. Men and women of Westfield and Deming offered places in their homes and barns for shelter, cared for the sick, and provided food, clothing, and other supplies for fugitive slaves.

At New Albany, Indiana, runaway slaves moved on to Salem and Bloomington before continuing north. Free blacks at Graysville in Jefferson County, especially George Evans, the African American stationmaster at Greenbrier, as well as other free blacks living in smaller communities near South Hanover and Kent provided aid and assistance to the fugitives moving to stations in Jennings and Decatur Counties. Free blacks also managed routes beginning at Jeffersonville, Indiana. African American agents operating in Rush County, Indiana, included Clarksburg resident Miles Meadows and Jim Hunt of Carthage; however, most of the agents in central Indiana were white men. White antislavery agents reportedly working in the Corydon area included Bill Crawford, John Rankin, and Zack Pennington.

Not all agents along the central route were successful in their efforts. Corydon resident Oswald Wright was arrested for aiding fugitive slaves in Harrison County, Indiana, during their escape from Kentucky. Wright was sentenced to five years in prison at the Frankfort (Kentucky) penitentiary and returned to Corydon after serving his sentence.

=== Western routes ===
Anti-Slavery League agents in western Indiana had boatmen ferry fugitives across the Ohio River from various points in Kentucky. These routes through Indiana began at Evansville, a river town in Vanderburgh County, or at crossings in Posey, Warrick, or Spencer Counties. The western routes continued north along the Wabash River, or through Gibson and Pike counties, toward Terre Haute in Vigo County and onward to Lafayette in Tippecanoe County. Routes from Evansville north to Princeton in Gibson County, Indiana, were not as frequently used as routes between Oakland City also in Gibson County, and Petersburg in Pike County.

A free black community at Evansville often provided aid for fugitives seeking refuge. Other free African American communities in western Indiana who assisted the fugitives included Lyles Station in Gibson County and Lost Creek in Vigo County. Thomas Cole, a free black from Lyles Station, about 5 miles (8.0 km) west of Princeton, used his farm as an Underground Railroad station. African American Ben Swain was the principal agent at Rockport, Indiana. Farther north in Parke County, Rueben Lawhorn, a free-born African American, was a part of the underground network, but others working along the western routes are unknown.

From Princeton, Indiana, fugitive slaves moved north to Bloomingdale in Parke County and onward to Michigan City in LaPorte County before crossing the Indiana-Michigan border. Other routes from Indiana led to Toledo, Ohio, a short distance to Canada. Arrivals from Rockport in Spencer County, Indiana, journeyed to Petersburg, where they hid in coal mines and coal banks before continuing north to Mooresville or Morgantown in Morgan County, Indiana, and Noblesville in Hamilton County, Indiana.

Warrick County farmer Ira Caswell (1814–1878), a secret member of the executive committee of the Anti-Slavery Society, was an outspoken abolitionist. He was also an active conductor on the Underground Railroad. His land north of Boonville was considered the first stop for runaways entering in Warrick County, Indiana, after crossing the Ohio River. The next stops in the area toward Daviess and Greene Counties were James Cockrum's barn cellar at Oakland City and Doctor John W. Posey's coal bank outside Petersburg. (Posey, a Petersburg physician and abolitionist, was owner of Blackburn Mine, a coal mine near Petersburg.)

In Gibson County, David Stormont (1802–1886), a member of the Reformed Presbyterian Church, and his wife provided runaways with food and clothing. They also hid runaways in their Gibson County home and at a log cabin on their property about 2.5 miles (4.0 km) northwest of Princeton. Other Gibson County residents provided aid and shelter, including John Carithers, an antislavery supporter and member of the local Reformed Presbyterian Church, and Charles Grier.

The underground network in west central Indiana, as in other areas of the state, was loosely organized. At the Bethel settlement, a Quaker community in Fountain County, cabins in the swamplands, area homesteads, and Bethel Church (affiliated with the Methodist Episcopal Church) were used as safehouses. Some fugitives remained in the community, living among the free blacks, but most escaped slaves moved north toward Canada. At Crawfordsville in nearby Montgomery County, the home of stonemason John Allen Speed, who later became the second mayor of the city, and his wife, Margaret, was used as a safehouse along the route to Lafayette.

== Reprisals ==
Some Quakers, but not all, opposed the radical activities of the Underground Railroad. Before abolitionism increased in popularity, some Quaker communities ostracized members who chose to participate in the underground network, but later discontinued the practice. Other Quakers formed separate congregations. In 1843, for example, a faction of the Society of Friends split to form the Yearly Meeting of the Anti-Slavery Friends.

Enforcement of fugitive slave laws and fear of being captured by bounty hunters and their deputies caused many African Americans, especially those living along Indiana's southern boundary, to move elsewhere. In some of African-American communities, locals were harsh in their treatment of informants who identified the whereabouts of hidden fugitives to collect rewards.

Several abolitionists in Indiana were the targets of violence for their participation in the Underground Railroad and helping runaway slaves escape capture. For example, Seth Concklin, a native of New York, ferried fugitive slaves from Alabama along the Tennessee River and Ohio River to reach the Wabash River near New Harmony, Indiana. Concklin volunteered his assistance, intending to reunite enslaved members of the Sill family with their free relatives in Philadelphia, Pennsylvania. After leaving the fugitives at a while he made arrangement to continue their journey, the family was captured and taken in a wagon toward Vincennes. Concklin tried unsuccessfully to free them, but he was captured himself and placed in chains. Concklin's antislavery friends moved quickly to get him released, but they were unsuccessful. The slavecatchers left Indiana aboard a steamboat with Concklin and the fugitive slaves. During the trip south, Conckln went missing from the steamboat. His body, still in chains, was retrieved from the river and his skull was crushed. Most thought it was the result of his fall in an attempted escape or possible suicide; however, antislavery supporters believed he had been murdered.

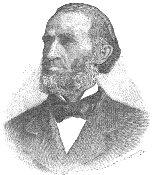
Calvin Fairbank

In another incident, Kentucky marshals abducted Calvin Fairbank, who aided a mulatto woman named Tamar by bringing her from Louisville, Kentucky, across the Ohio River to Indiana. Fairbank was captured at Jeffersonville, Indiana, while returning to Kentucky on November 9, 1851. Following his trial in Kentucky, Fairbank was convicted and sentenced to fifteen years in prison. Fairbank served twelve years before John J. Crittenden, the governor of Kentucky, pardoned him in 1864.

== Effects on Indiana ==
The Underground Railroad helped change Hoosier opinions about slavery. In the decades prior to the Civil War, Indiana's abolitionists, antislavery supporters, and free people of color remained staunchly opposed to slavery, but the majority of Indiana residents were indifferent to the issue. Many Hoosiers, especially those in the southern part of the state who had migrated to Indiana from slave states in the South, had a more tolerant attitude toward slavery. Popular opinion regarding the plight of escaping slaves eventually shifted, especially after witnessing bounty hunters and slavecatchers forcibly taking runaways and, in some cases, free people of color into bondage. By the late 1850s and early 1860s, public attitudes in Indiana had swung firmly against the continuation of slavery in the United States.

In 1998, the National Park Service initiated efforts to encourage further research regarding the Underground Railroad and establishing the National Underground Railroad Network to Freedom program. State organizations such as the Indiana Division of Historic Preservation and Archaeology subsequently established initiatives of their own. The Indiana Department of National Resources continues to sponsor an Indiana Freedom Trails History Marker Program. The Indiana Freedom Trails, Inc., a nonprofit organization, was established in 1998 to support research and educational efforts related to Indiana sites and routes that were part of the underground network. In addition, state historical markers have been placed at sites linked to the Underground Railroad in Indiana, as well as other related topics.

== See also ==
- History of slavery in Indiana
- Allen Chapel African Methodist Episcopal Church, Terre Haute
