= Catherine White Coffin =

American abolitionist (1803–1881)

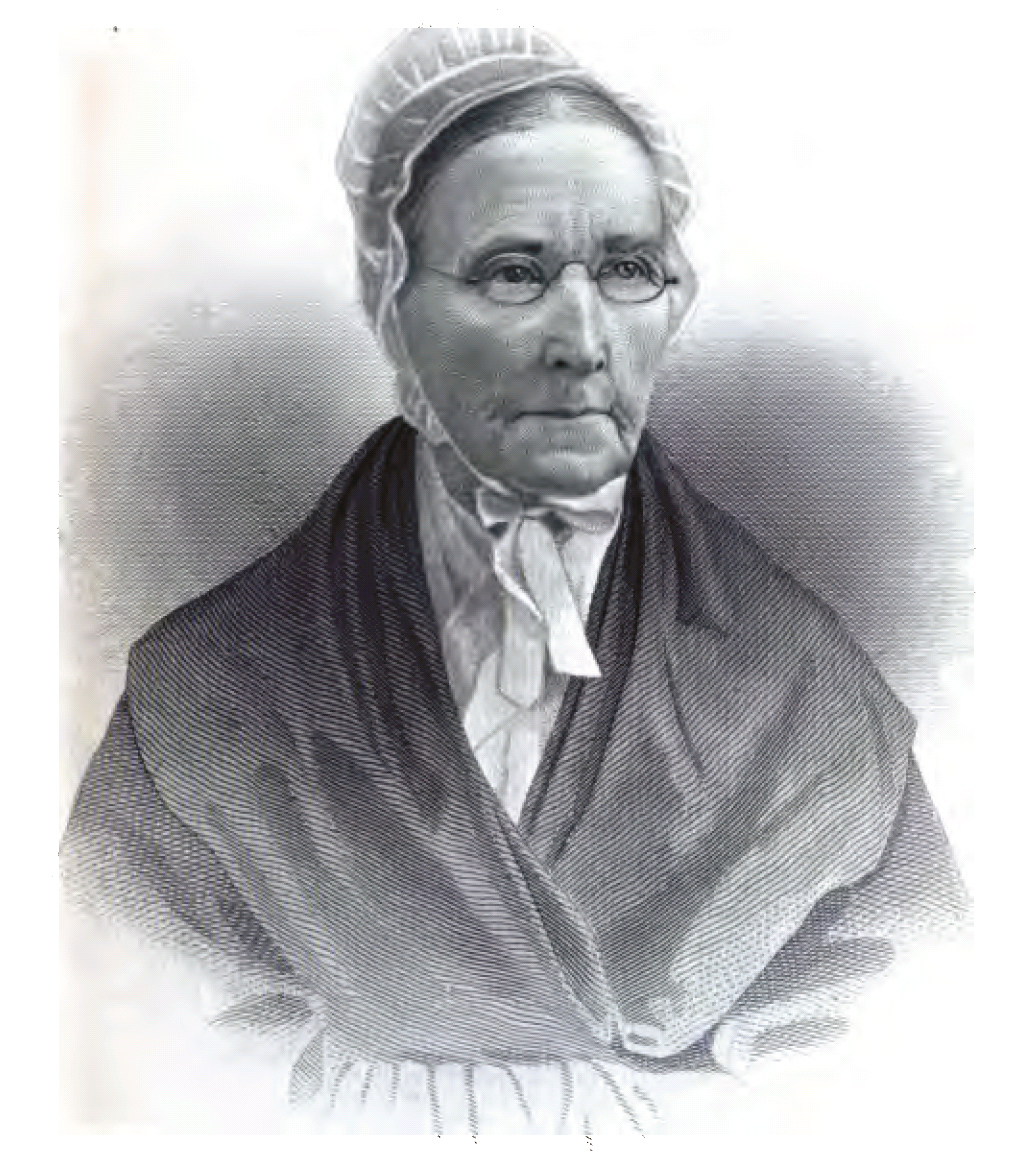
Catherine White Coffin (c. 1879)

Catherine White Coffin (born Catherine White; September 10, 1803 – May 22, 1881), also known as "Auntie Katie", was an American Quaker abolitionist and the wife of Levi Coffin, the unofficial "President of the Underground Railroad". The Coffin home in Fountain City, Wayne County, Indiana, has since been turned into a museum, and was referred to as the Underground Railroad's "Grand Central Station". Catherine and Levi had six children, three of whom did not survive to adulthood. Levi Coffin said "There never was a night too cold, or dark or rainy, for her to get up at any hour, and prepare a meal for the poor fugitives [...] many a time 12, 15, and even 17 sat down," about his wife on their fifteenth wedding anniversary.

== Family and marriage ==
Catherine White was born on September 10, 1803, in Guilford County, North Carolina. She was born to Stanton and Mary White. Catherine had three brothers and three sisters: Hannah White (1796–?), Isaac White Sr. (1798–1840), Mary Polly Ann White (1801–1849), Jesse White (1805–1863), Micajah White (1808–?), and Elizabeth White (1811–1814).

On October 24, 1824, at age 21, White married Levi Coffin Jr., a farmer from Guilford County, North Carolina at Hopewell Friends Meetinghouse in North Carolina. They had six children: Jesse, Addison, Thomas, Henry, Anna, and Sarah. Addison (July 9, 1828 – 1830), Thomas (September 15, 1831 – March 29, 1832), and Anna (August 14, 1839 – July 16, 1850) died during childhood while Jesse (August 1, 1825 – September 25, 1899), Henry (1836–1916), and Sarah (October 2, 1843 – May 11, 1869) made it to adulthood.

== Women on the Underground Railroad ==
From 1800 to 1865, when the Underground Railroad was active, women had many jobs to help slaves remain inconspicuous. These jobs included making food and clothing, organising hiding places in their homes for the slaves, along with nursing them back to health if they were sick, and providing counseling if they needed to talk. Some other potential jobs included transportation to the next safe house, giving instructions on how to get there or even a personal escort there. Possible penalties for helping escaped slaves after the passing of the Fugitive Slave Act of 1850 included flogging, imprisonment and even death. Women were usually known by Mrs. [husband's name] or [husband's name]'s wife instead of their own name.

== Underground Railroad 'Conductors' ==
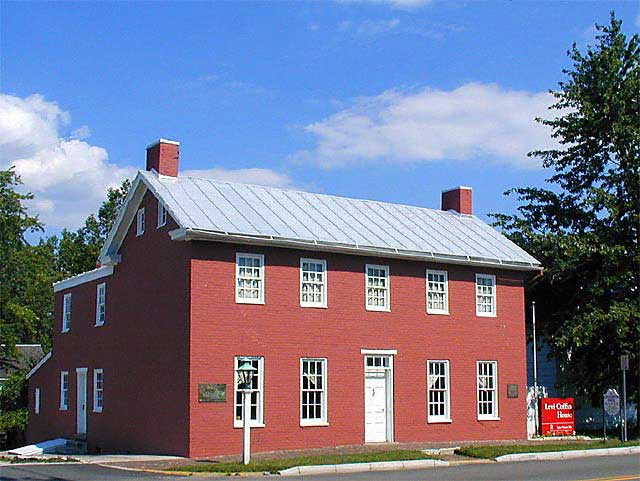

The Coffins' house was known as the "Grand Central Station of the Underground Railroad". The house is a federal style two-story, brick building occupying less than one acre of land built in 1839, with eight rooms which was modified to create better hiding spots. Secret doors, multiple ways out of rooms, and a well in the basement were all added to create a better safe house for the runaway slaves.

The Coffins moved from Indiana to Cincinnati, Ohio, along the Ohio-Kentucky border, in 1847. At that time Cincinnati was split between proslavery and antislavery. Often, slave owners and authorities would chase the escaped slaves. The Coffins moved around the town before they found the perfect house. It had many rooms and was used as a boarding house. It had a larger attic. The boarding house was the perfect cover for their station. Catherine created costumes to disguise the slaves as maids, butlers and Quaker women.

== Death and legacy ==
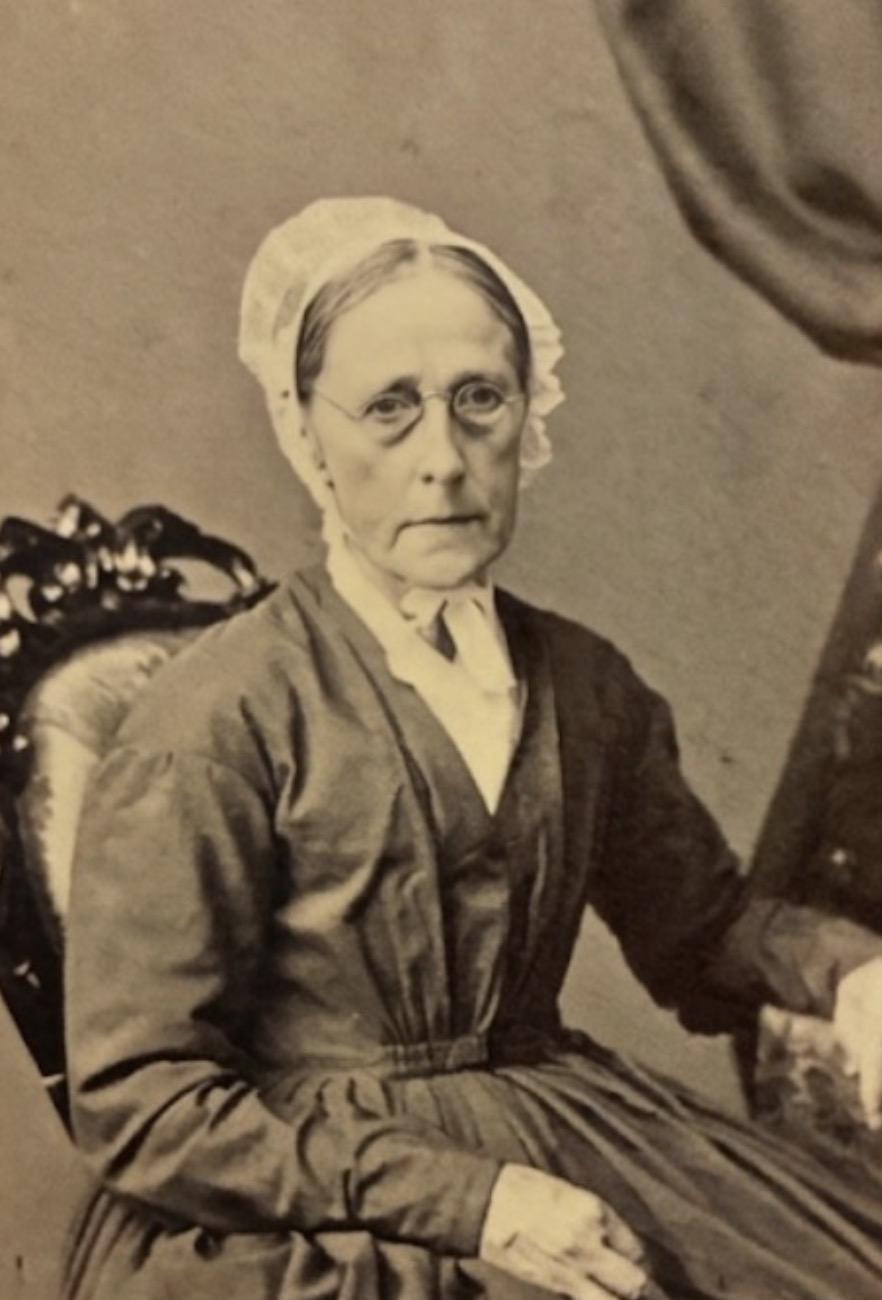
Catherine White Coffin, ca. 1878 - 1880

Catherine Coffin died on May 25, 1881, from pneumonia. She was originally buried at the Friends Burying Ground in South Cumminsville, a suburb of Cincinnati. She was later reinterred with her husband in the Quaker plot at the Spring Grove Cemetery, also, in Cincinnati. Catherine organized a sewing group that made clothes for the slaves. They would meet with slaves to find sizes and choose pieces from the Antislavery Sewing Society collection at the Coffin house to work with. No records were kept but it is believed that the Coffins helped over 2000 slaves. Their house was later added to the National Register of Historic Places in 1966. The characters Simeon and Rachel Halliday from Uncle Tom's Cabin were based on Levi and Catherine Coffin.

== See also ==
- Peter Fossett, former enslaved person at Monticello who was a conductor of Coffin's Underground Railroad
- Eliza Harris, former enslaved person who crossed the Ohio River with her baby, then told her story to Harriet Beecher Stowe, became the character Eliza in Uncle Tom's Cabin
- Harriet Beecher Stowe, author of Uncle Tom's Cabin, close friend of the Coffins when they lived in Cincinnati
