= New Garden Township =

New Garden Township may refer to the following townships in the United States:

- New Garden Township, Wayne County, Indiana
- New Garden Township, Pennsylvania
