= Levi Coffin House =

Historic house in Indiana, United States

- U.S. National Register of Historic Places
- U.S. National Historic Landmark
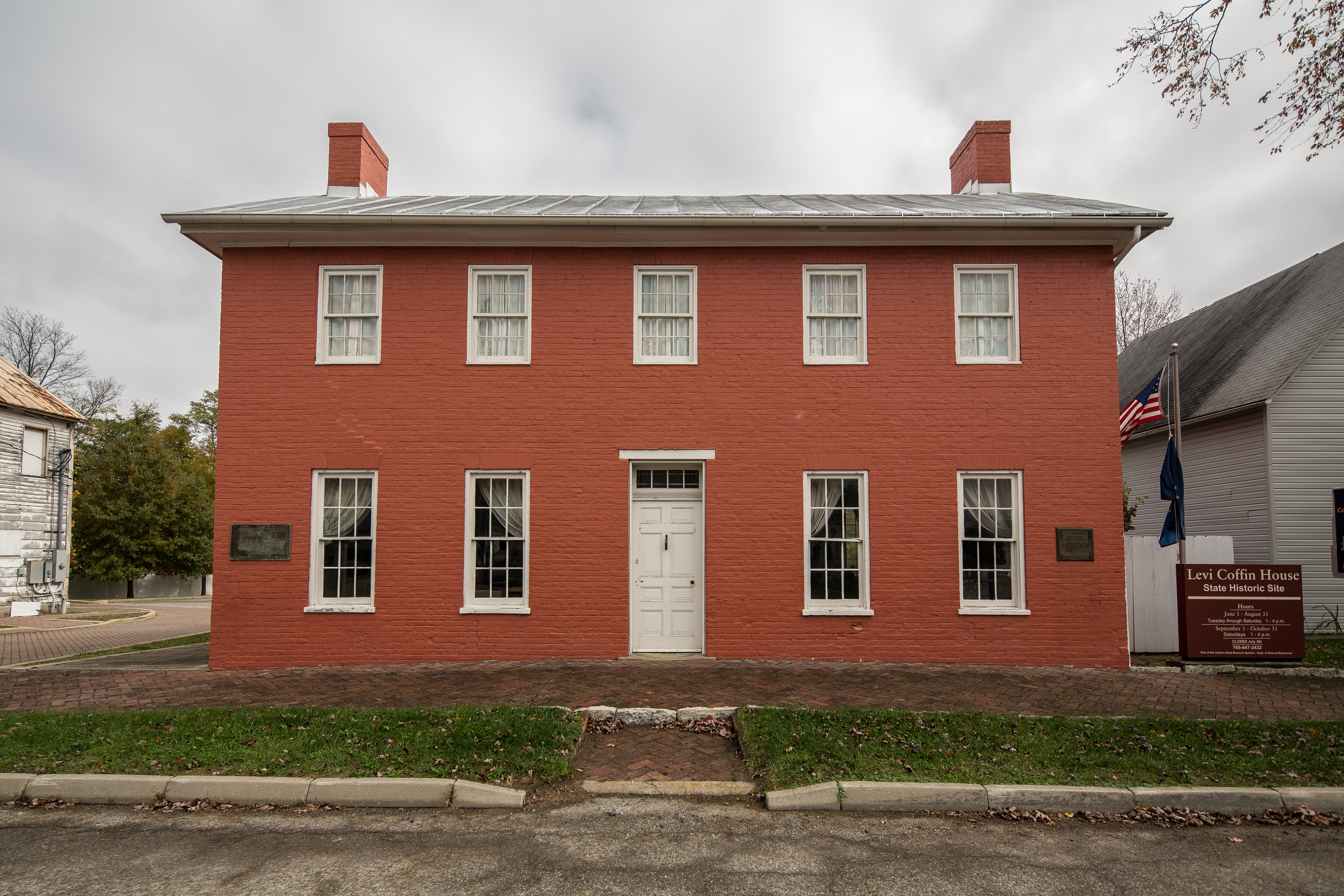

- Location within Indiana Location within the United States
- Location: Fountain City, Indiana
- Coordinates: 39°57′22.5″N 84°55′2.5″W
- Area: less than one acre
- Architectural style: Federal
- NRHP reference No.: 66000009

Significant dates
- Added to NRHP: October 15, 1966
- Designated NHL: June 23, 1965

The Coffin House is a National Historic Landmark located in the present-day town of Fountain City in Wayne County, Indiana. The two-story, eight room, brick home was constructed circa 1838–39 in the Federal style. The Coffin home became known as the "Grand Central Station" of the Underground Railroad because of its location where three of the escape routes to the North converged and the number of fleeing slaves who passed through it.

Its original owners, Catharine and Levi Coffin, were Quaker abolitionists who provided fugitive slaves with supplies and a safe place to stay. During the twenty years (1826 to 1847) that The Coffins lived in Indiana it is believed that they helped as many as 2,000 slaves escape to freedom in the Northern United States and in Canada. (The Coffins continued their role as local leaders in the Underground Railroad after their move to Ohio in 1847 and provided aid to approximately 1,300 more slaves to assist in their escape to the North.) In 1966 the Coffin's Indiana home became the first property in the state to be added to the National Register of Historic Places. The Levi Coffin House Association operates the property under an agreement with the Indiana Department of Natural Resources, the historic home's present-day owner. The site is open to the public for tours, Tuesday through Saturday, from June through October. Admission is charged for visitors over the age of six. The Coffin House was ranked as “one of the nation’s Top 25 Historical Sites” by the History Channel. In 2016, the Smithsonian named the Levi Coffin House Interpretive Center “one of 12 new museums around the world to visit,” while the Indiana Office of Tourism Development voted it as one of the top museums in the State of Indiana.

== History ==
=== Original owners ===
Catharine and Levi Coffin, the home's original owners, along with the first of their six children migrated from Guilford County, North Carolina, to Wayne County, Indiana, to join other members of the Coffin family. The Coffins settled at Newport (the present-day town of Fountain City) in Wayne County in 1826 and established a home.

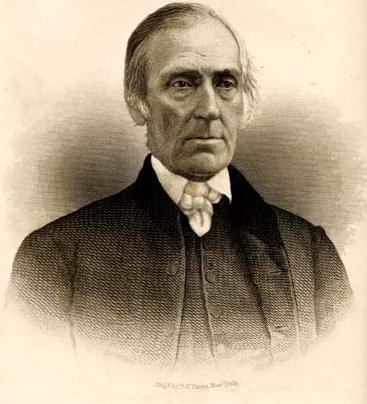
Levi Coffin

Levi Coffin (1798–1877) was a Quaker abolitionist, businessman, and humanitarian who became an active leader in the Underground Railroad in Indiana and Ohio. Known for his leadership in aiding fugitive slaves, Coffin opposed slavery and was given the unofficial title of "President of the Underground Railroad." Catharine (White) Coffin (1803–81) also took an active role in assisting fugitive slaves, which included providing food, clothing, and a safe haven in the Coffin home.

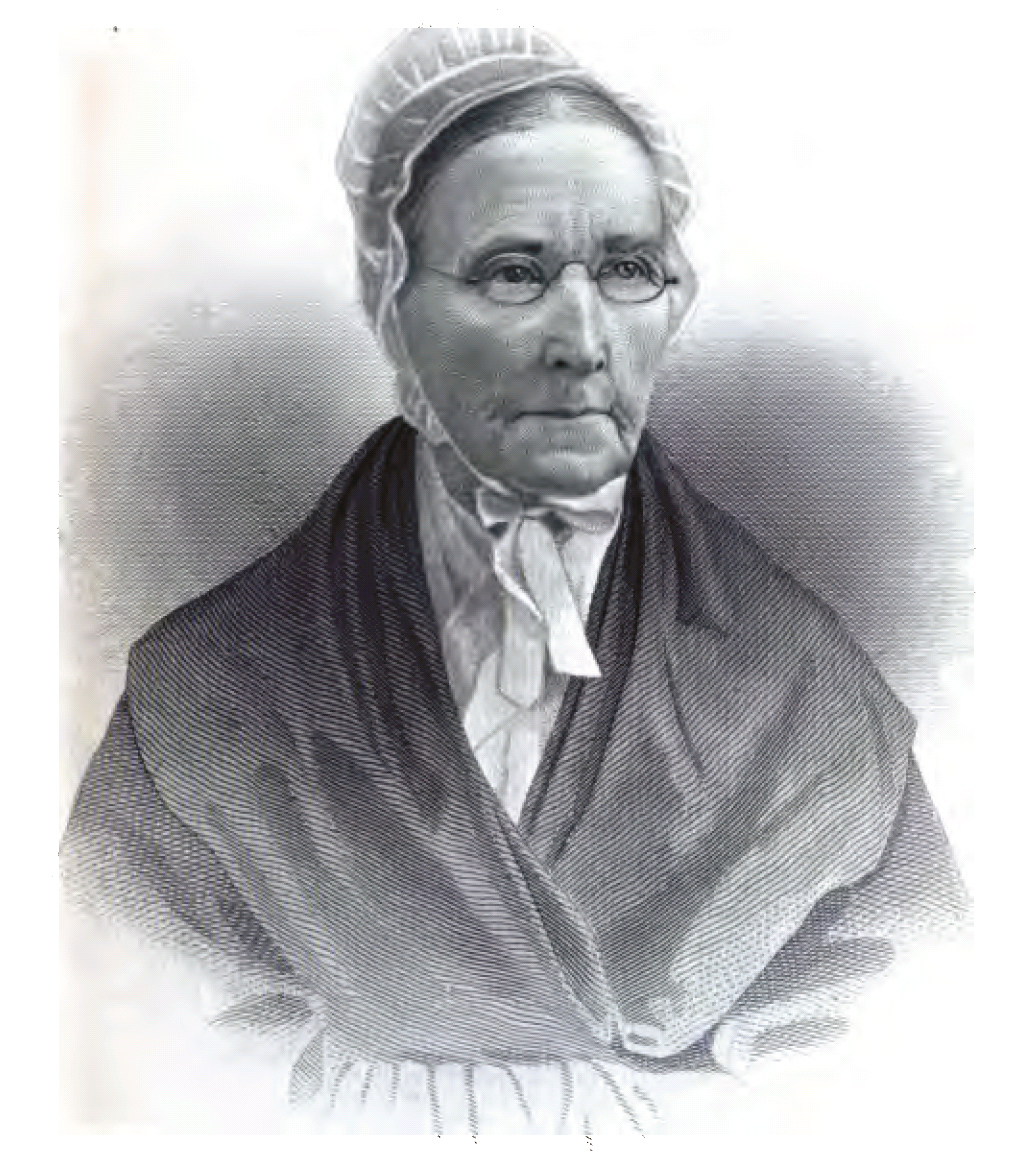
Catharine White Coffin, 1879

The Coffins began sheltering fugitive slaves in Indiana during the winter of 1826–27, not long after their arrival at Newport. Their home became one of several Underground Railroad stops in a larger network of sites that provided aid to runaway slaves as they traveled north to freedom in Canada. Underground Railroad conductors guided escaping slaves through Kentucky, where they typically crossed the Ohio River at one of three points: Madison, Indiana; Jeffersonville, Indiana; or Cincinnati, Ohio. After the crossing many of the escaping slaves were led to the Coffin House. The Coffins and their neighbors provided fugitive slaves with supplies and a place to stay until they could be transported further north. Coffin later estimated that, on average, they helped one hundred slaves escape each year. Although the Coffins did not keep records of their activities because it was illegal to assist runaway slaves, it is believed that they helped as many as 2,000 of them to freedom in the North and in Canada during the twenty years (1826 to 1847) that they lived in Indiana.

Harriet Beecher Stowe's fictional work, Uncle Tom's Cabin, told stories of slaves who escaped on the Underground Railroad. Stowe was living in Cincinnati at the time she wrote the novel and became acquainted with the Coffins, who may have been the inspiration for the fictional Quaker couple named Simeon and Rachael Halliday in her story. Stowe's book relates the tale of Eliza Harris, a slave girl from the South who escaped by crossing the frozen Ohio River with her baby on a winter night. After receiving food, clothing, new shoes, and shelter from the Hallidays, Harris continued her journey to freedom in Canada.

At the urging of friends in the anti-slavery movement, the Coffins left Newport and moved to the Cincinnati, Ohio, area in 1847 to take over management of a store and wholesale warehouse that supplied free-labor goods produced without slave labor. Coffin sold the business in 1857, after determining that it would be impossible to sustain a profit, but the Coffins continued their role as local leaders in the Underground Railroad. It is estimated that they provided 1,300 fugitive slaves with a safe haven in their Ohio home. Coffin later became an agent for the Western Freedman's Aid Society, petitioned the U.S. government to create the Freedmen's Bureau, and in 1867 served as a delegate to the International Anti-Slavery Conference in Paris before retiring from public life.

=== Residence and Underground Railroad stop ===
The Coffin family's residence that later became a state historic site was originally built circa 1838–39. Its location at the point where three of the escape routes to the North converged, along with the number of fugitive slaves who passed through the home, caused it to become known as the "Grand Central Station" of the Underground Railroad. Because Coffin would demand to see a search warrant and slave-ownership papers for suspected runaway slaves before allowing entry, the house was never searched. By the time the slave-catchers returned from the county seat of Centerville (a round trip of 26 miles (42 km) to acquire the documents), the fugitive slaves would have been transported to other locations. The Coffin home in Indiana continued to operate as a stopover for the Underground Railroad after the Coffins moved to Ohio in 1847.

=== Hotel and apartment building ===
In the late nineteenth and early twentieth centuries, the home was used as a hotel. After 1911 it was converted to apartments and passed through several owners before it was restored in the 1960s. Fortunately, the property was kept in good condition, including preservation of some of its original windowpanes and woodwork.

=== Historic site ===
The Coffin house was named a National Historic Landmark and in 1966 it became the first property in the state to be added to the National Register of Historic Places. Indiana's state government acquired the house in 1967 and leased it to the Wayne County Historical Society. The home has been restored to appear as it did in the 1840s when the Coffins lived there. The restoration was done by Himelick Construction of Fountain City. After its restoration the home opened to the public as a historic site in 1970.

The Indiana State Museum and Historic Sites operates the historic house. The historic site is open to the public for tours from 10 a.m. to 5 p.m. Wednesday through Sunday.

== Description ==
The home is located at 113 U.S. Route 27 in the center of present-day Fountain City, Indiana. The two-story, modified Federal-style brick home is painted red and had a two-story rear wing on the northwest corner of the main structure. The home faces east with its main entrance along Main Cross Street (U.S. Route 27). Another entrance at Mill Street provides access to the rear wing.

The eight-room interior includes furnishings in the style of a Quaker family living in Indiana during the 1840s. Its original fireplaces, doors, floors and portions of the home's woodwork have been restored. The main entrance opens into a central hallway that includes a room on each side and a staircase leading to the second floor. The south room on the main floor includes built-in bookcases that are original to the home. The north room on the main floor served as the home's parlor and leads to a dining room in the rear wing. Stairs lead down to a kitchen and spring room in the basement. A spring-fed well in the basement provided the home with access to fresh water. The second floor contains three bedrooms.

The Coffin home's interior had several modifications that could have been used as hiding places for runaway slaves in case the house was searched. Most of the rooms have at least two exits. A secret door installed in the maids' quarters in the rear addition on the second floor provided access for as many as fourteen fugitive slaves to hide in a narrow crawlspace between the walls. The upstairs rooms could accommodate extra visitors. The home also contains a large attic and storage garrets.

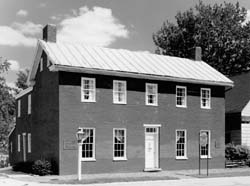
Home of Levi Coffin in Fountain City.

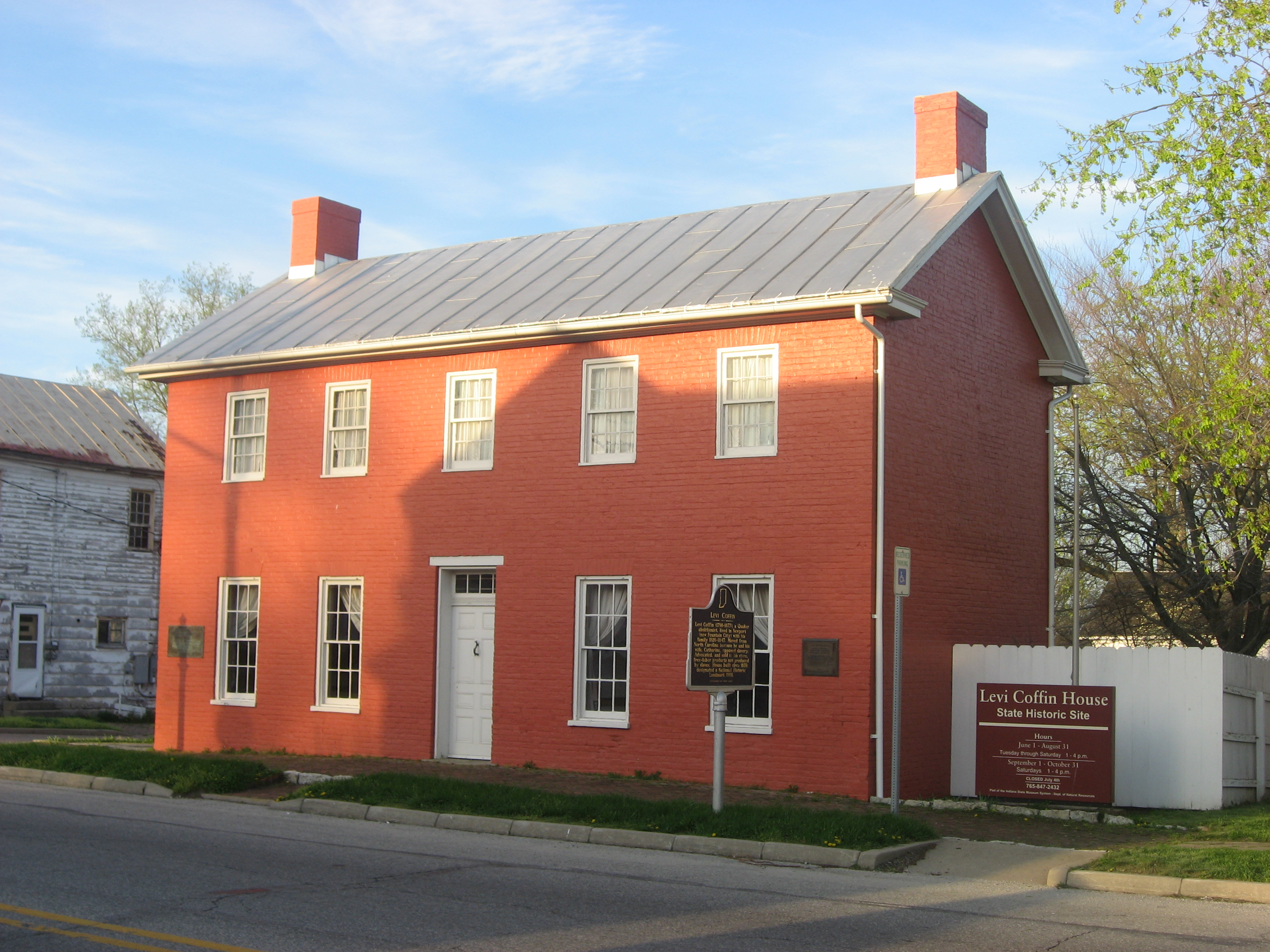
Front and southern side of the Levi Coffin House

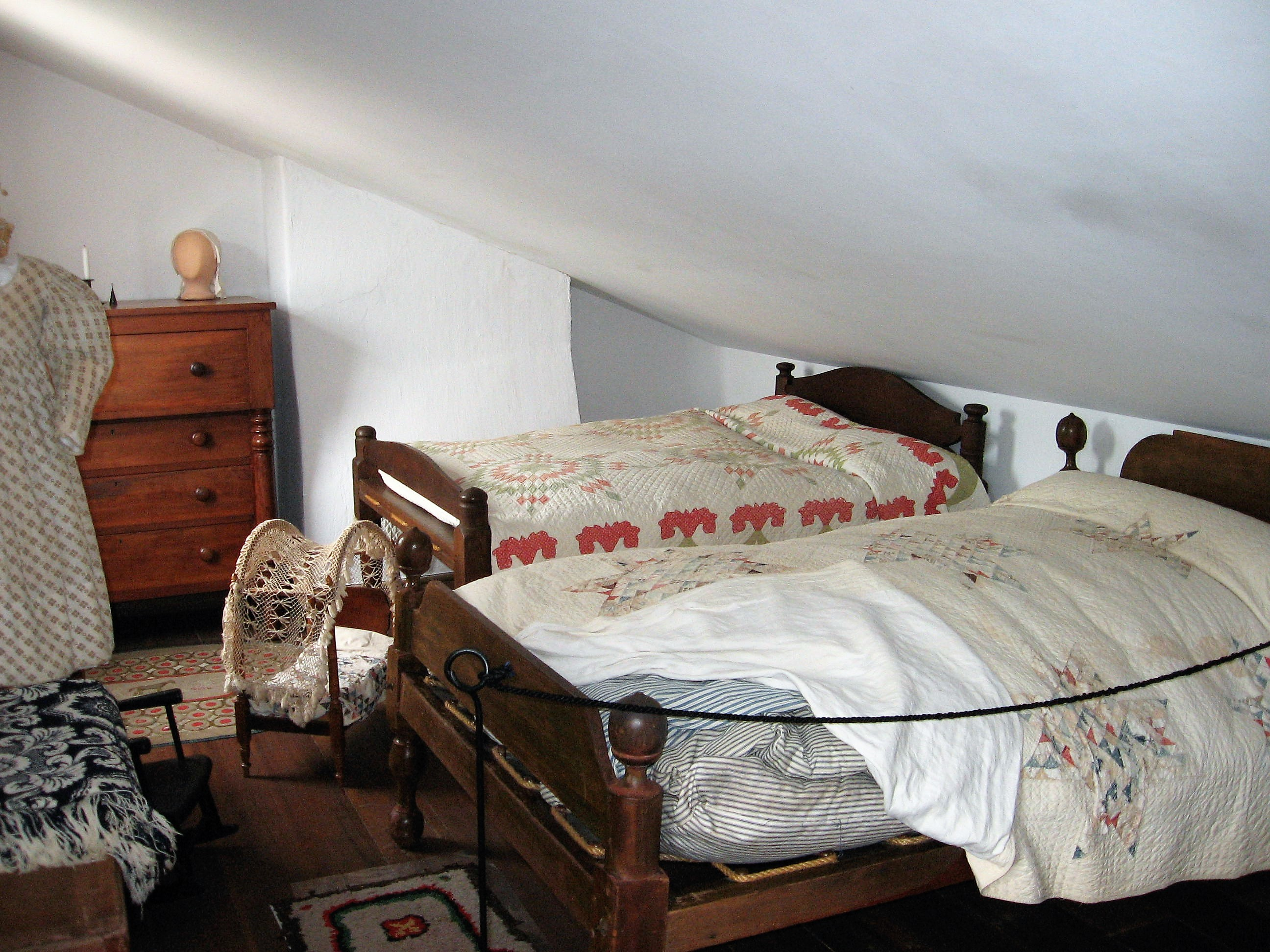
Levi Coffin Home beds

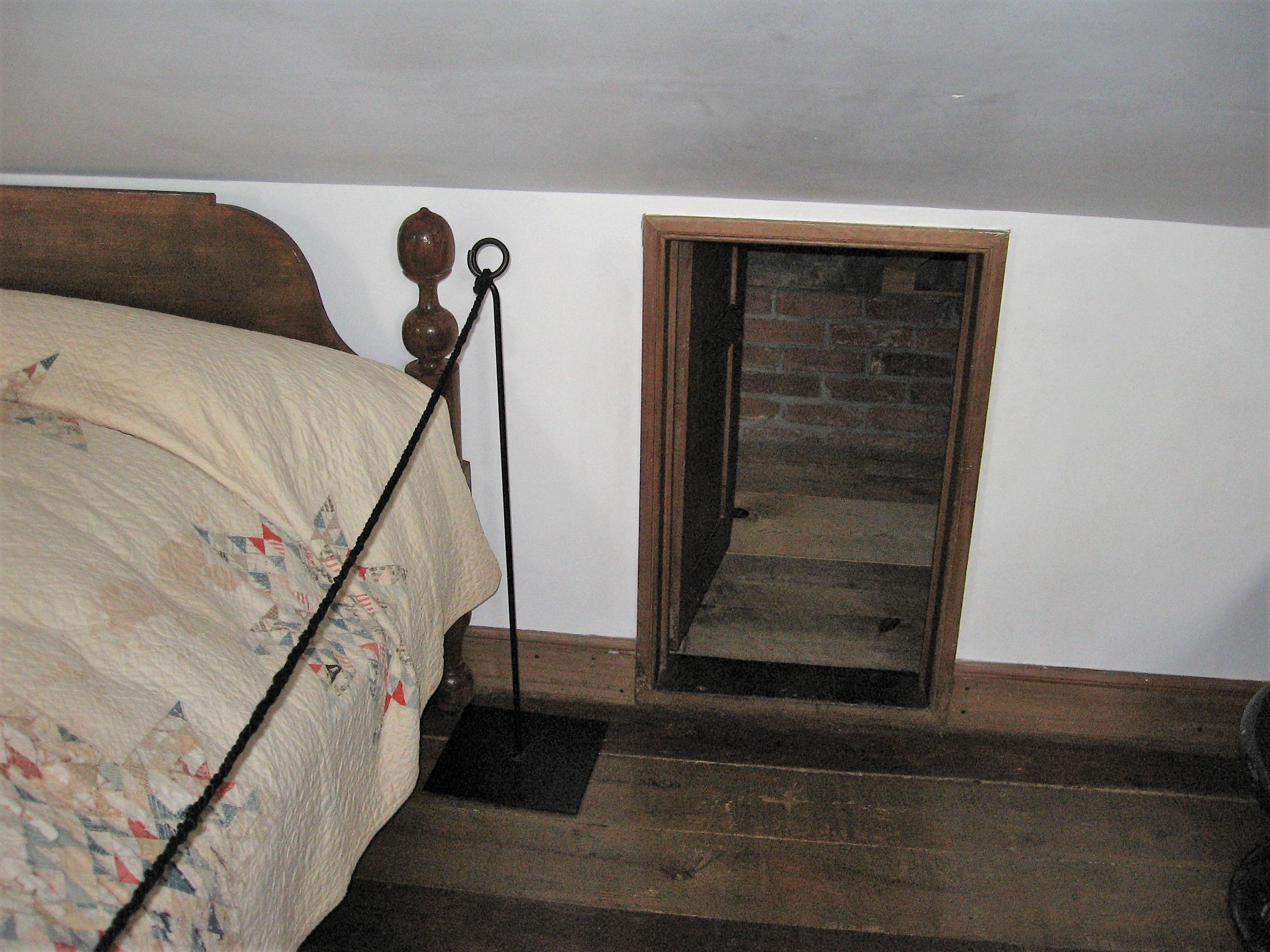
Levi Coffin Home hiding hole

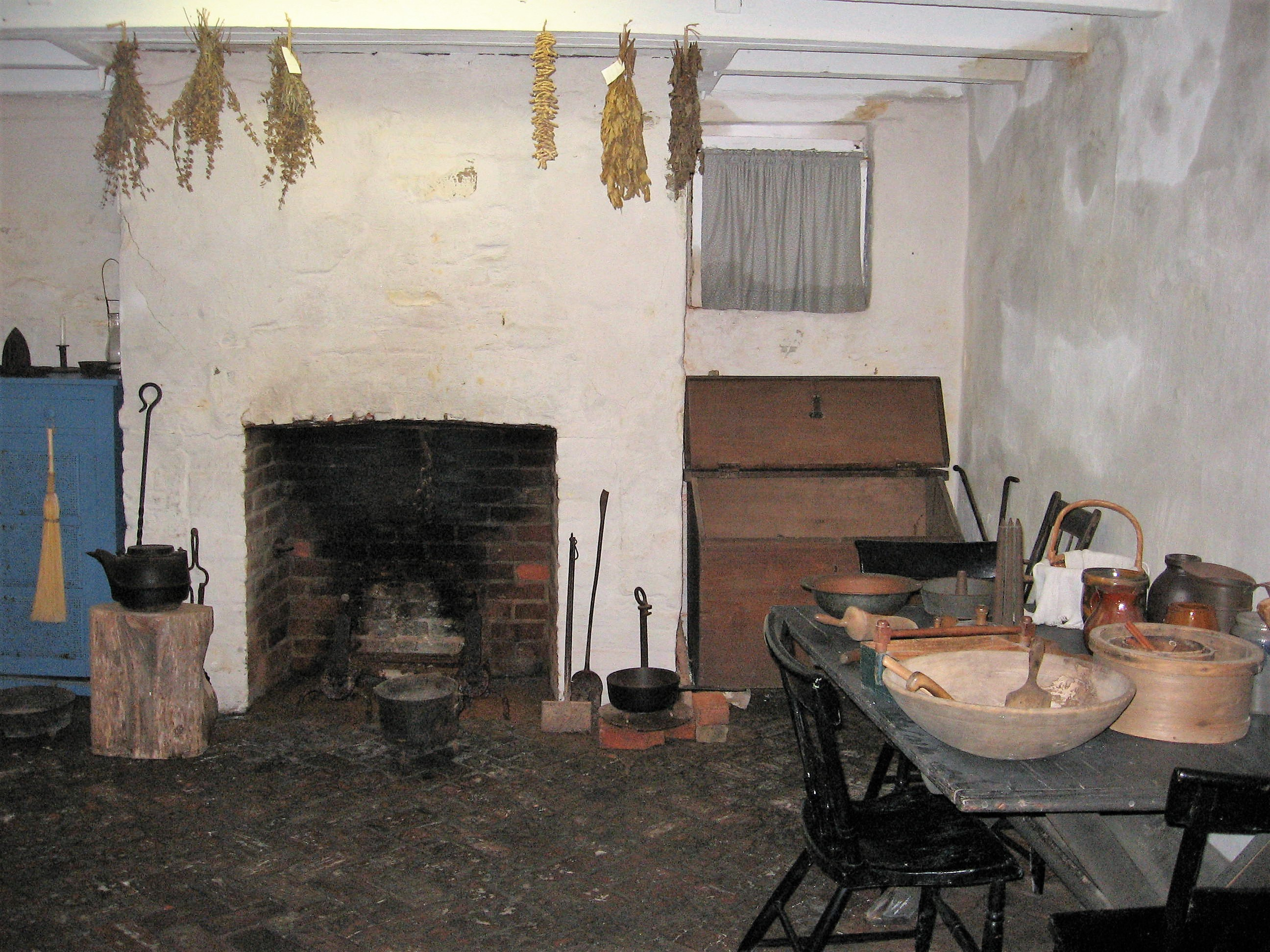
Levi Coffin Home Kitchen

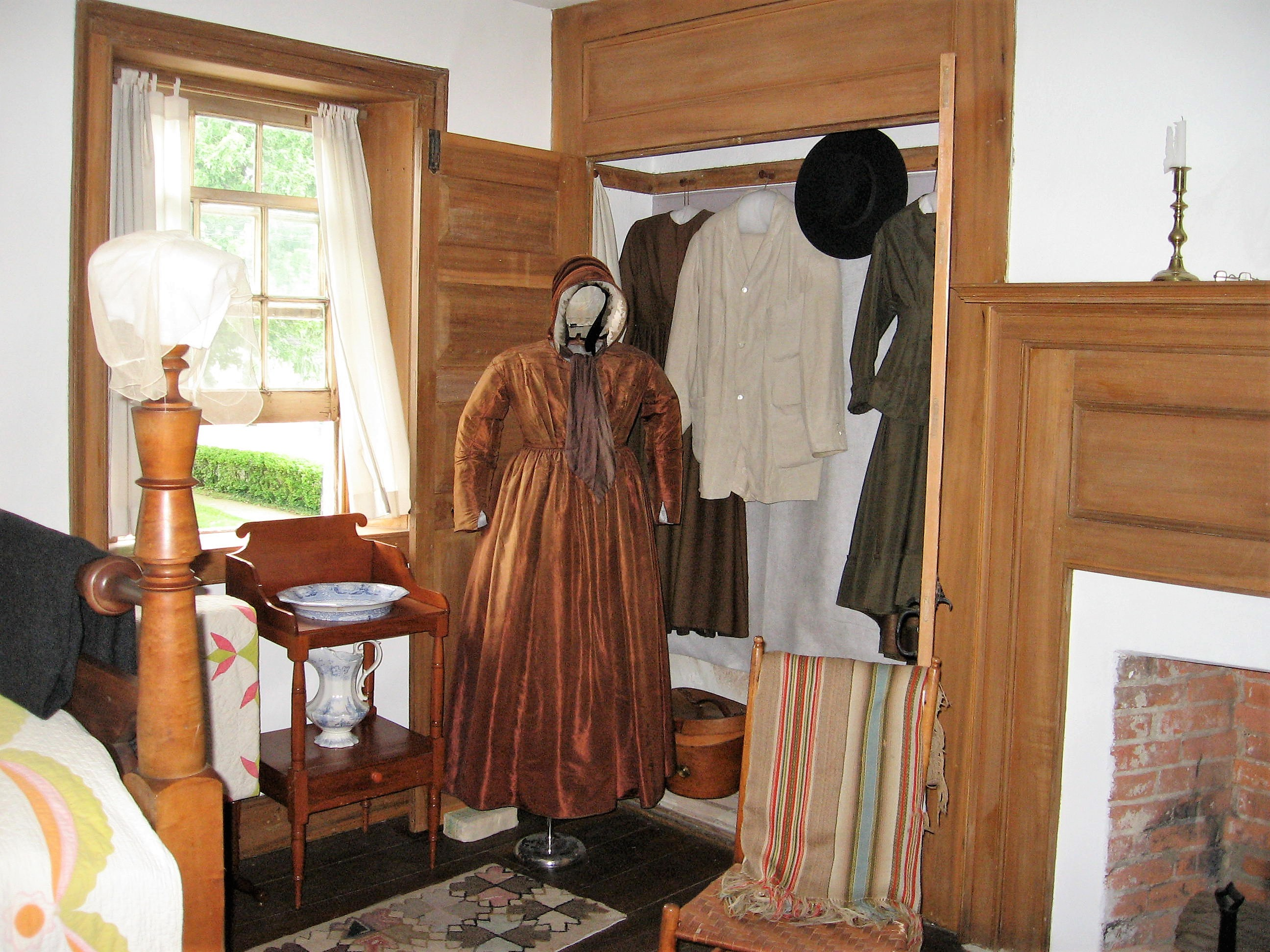
Levi Coffin Home closet

== See also ==
- Underground Railroad in Indiana
- List of museums in Indiana
- List of National Historic Landmarks in Indiana
- National Register of Historic Places listings in Wayne County, Indiana
