= New Garden Township, Wayne County, Indiana =

New Garden Township
- Township
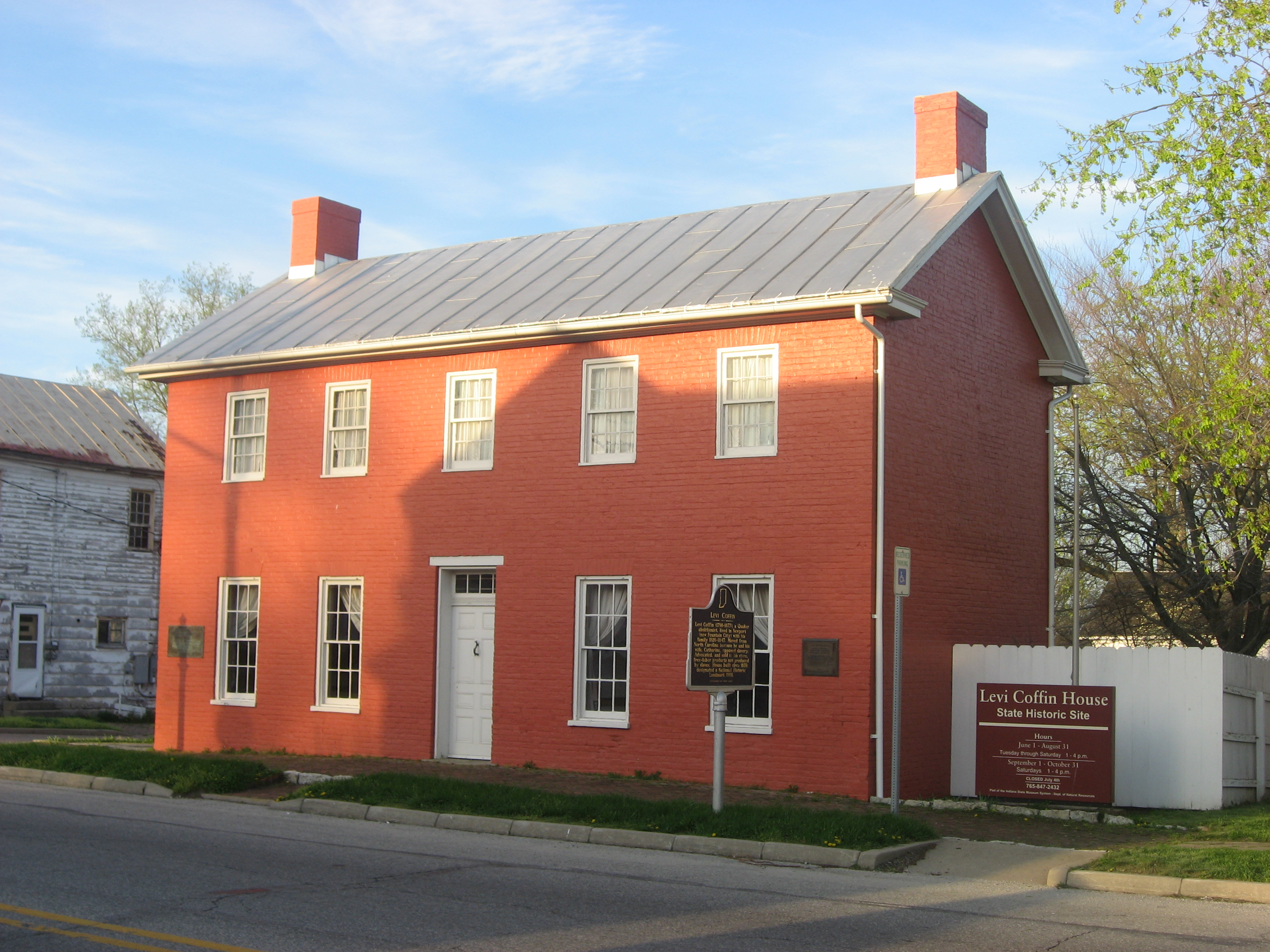
- The Levi Coffin House, a historic place in Fountain City

- Location in Wayne County
- Coordinates: 39°57′38″N 84°55′11″W
- Country: United States
- State: Indiana
- County: Wayne

Government
  - Type: Indiana township

Area
  - Total: 23.4 sq mi (61 km^{2})
  - Land: 23.39 sq mi (60.6 km^{2})
  - Water: 0.02 sq mi (0.052 km^{2}) 0.09%
- Elevation: 1,120 ft (340 m)

Population (2020)
  - Total: 1,949
  - Density: 84.5/sq mi (32.6/km^{2})
- Time zone: UTC-5 (Eastern (EST))
  - Summer (DST): UTC-4 (EDT)
- Area code: 765
- GNIS feature ID: 453664

New Garden Township is one of fifteen townships in Wayne County, Indiana, United States. As of the 2010 census, its population was 1,977 and it contained 794 housing units.

== History ==
New Garden Township was organized in 1817. It was named by Quaker settlers after the New Garden Friends meeting house, in Guilford County, North Carolina.

== Geography ==
According to the 2010 census, the township has a total area of 23.4 square miles (61 km^{2}), of which 23.39 square miles (60.6 km^{2}) (or 99.96%) is land and 0.02 square miles (0.052 km^{2}) (or 0.09%) is water. The streams of Berg Brook, Fellow Brook, Fountain Creek, Garden Run, Gray Brook, Grove Creek, Knoll Run, Line Brook, Odd Run, Pole Creek, Quack Creek, Reel Run, Silver Brook, Slow Run, Willow Run, Woods Branch and Youngs Brook run through this township.

=== Cities and towns ===
- Fountain City

=== Adjacent townships ===
- Greensfork Township, Randolph County (northeast)
- Franklin Township (east)
- Wayne Township (south)
- Webster Township (southwest)
- Green Township (west)
- Washington Township, Randolph County (northwest)

=== Cemeteries ===
The township contains two cemeteries: Independent Order of Odd Fellows and Willow Grove.

=== Major highways ===
- U.S. Route 27
