= Eliza Harris (Civil War nurse) =

Elizabeth "Eliza" Harris
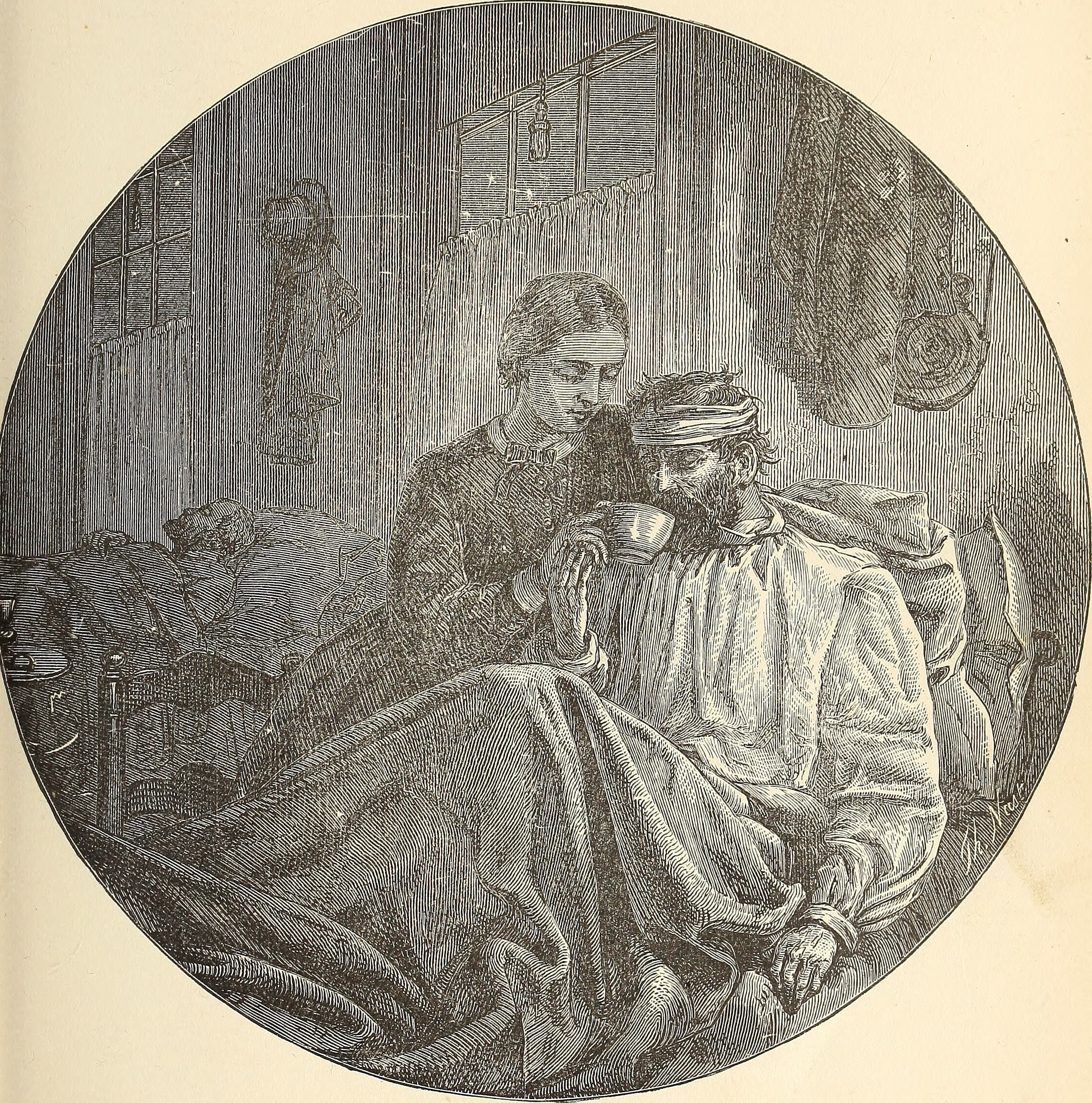
- Sanitary Commission nurse assisting a wounded soldier in 1864
- Born: 1831; St Athan, South Wales, United Kingdom
- Died: June 12, 1891; Shenandoah, Pennsylvania
- Occupations: American Civil War nurse US Sanitary Commission agent
- Years active: 4
- Known for: Invented ginger panada

Elizabeth Harris (1831 – June 12, 1891) served as a United States Sanitary Commission agent, army nurse, and newspaper correspondent during the American Civil War. She was active in the Eastern Theater of the American Civil War until September 1863, when she went to Tennessee for several months before returning to the east. After the war, she was active in national reform causes.

== Early life ==
Elizabeth Harris was probably born in 1831 at St Athan, in the Vale of Glamorgan, Wales, in the United Kingdom. Most of early life is not known, including the year when she traveled to the United States of America. She married John Harris who practiced medicine in Philadelphia, Pennsylvania.

== Civil War career ==
In April 1861 at the start of the Civil War, Harris helped organize the Ladies' Aid Society of Philadelphia. She became the Society's field correspondent with the task of distributing the supplies gathered by the group. Because of her organizing talent, other ladies' aid societies in Pennsylvania secured her assistance. She became an agent for the United States Christian Commission and the U.S. Sanitary Commission. She accompanied the Union Army and tended to sick and wounded soldiers in the Peninsula campaign in March–July 1862, after the Second Battle of Bull Run in August 1862, and after the Battle of Antietam in September 1862. She also performed nursing duties aboard a hospital ship after the Battle of Seven Pines in June 1862.

Harris was active in the Eastern Theater from the First Battle of Bull Run through the Battle of Gettysburg. She was credited with inventing ginger panada which consisted of cornmeal, mashed army crackers, ginger, wine, and boiling water. This concoction, which was also called bully soup, was fed to soldiers in both eastern and western theaters of the war. Among her many duties, she distributed and cooked food, nursed sick and wounded soldiers, helped with amputations, cleaned up after surgeries, and prayed with the soldiers. She also wrote newspaper articles about her experiences; these helped raise donations for the Sanitary Commission.

Despite being warned by the War Department not to go, Harris traveled to Gettysburg after the July 1863 battle. Next, she went with the soldiers to Tennessee where she remained from September 1863 to May 1864. While there, she served in the hospitals in Nashville and Chattanooga. However, she became ill and returned to Washington, D.C. After she recovered, she nursed soldiers in the Fredericksburg, Virginia, hospital. During the war, she visited over 100 hospitals in her capacity as a nurse or as an advocate for improved health care.

== Late and post-war ==
From late 1864 to early 1865, Harris assisted fugitive slaves and other war refugees from Virginia, North Carolina, and Tennessee. She also cared for the repatriated Union Army prisoners from Andersonville. At war's end, she returned home to Philadelphia where her husband's medical practice was successful. In later years she was involved in nursing and support for local and national reform causes. She died on June 12, 1891, in Shenandoah, Pennsylvania.
