= Levi Coffin =

American educator and abolitionist (1798–1877)

Levi Coffin Jr.
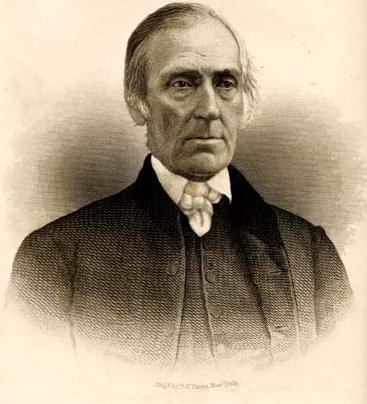
- A drawing based on a c. 1850 engraving
- Born: October 28, 1798; Guilford County, North Carolina, U.S.
- Died: September 16, 1877 (aged 78); Avondale, Cincinnati, Ohio, U.S.
- Resting place: Spring Grove Cemetery, Cincinnati, Ohio
- Occupations: Farmer; Pork packing Merchant; Banking
- Known for: work with Underground Railroad
- Political party: Whig; Republican
- Board member of: Western Freedman's Society; Second State Bank of Indiana
- Spouse: Catherine White
- Relatives: Lucretia Coffin Mott (cousin)

Levi Coffin Jr. (October 28, 1798 – September 16, 1877) was an American Quaker, Republican, abolitionist, farmer, businessman and humanitarian. An active leader of the Underground Railroad in Indiana and Ohio, some unofficially called Coffin the "President of the Underground Railroad", estimating that three thousand fugitive slaves passed through his care. The Coffin home in Fountain City, Wayne County, Indiana, is a museum, sometimes called the Underground Railroad's "Grand Central Station".

Born near what became Greensboro, North Carolina, Coffin was exposed to and came to oppose slavery as a child. His family immigrated to Indiana in 1826, avoiding slaveholders' increasing persecution of Quakers, whose faith did not permit them to own slaves and who assisted freedom seekers. In Indiana, Coffin settled near the National Road with other Quakers in Wayne County, Indiana, near the Ohio border. He farmed, as well as became a local merchant and business leader. Coffin became a major investor in and director of the local Richmond branch of the Second State Bank of Indiana in the 1830s, Richmond being the Wayne County seat. His financial position at the bank and standing in the community also helped supply food, clothing and transportation for Underground Railroad operations in the region.

At the urging of friends in the anti-slavery movement, Coffin moved southward to the important Ohio River port city of Cincinnati in 1847, where he ran a warehouse that sold only free-labor goods. Despite making considerable progress with the business, the free-labor venture proved unprofitable; Coffin abandoned the enterprise after a decade. Meanwhile, during this 1847 through 1857 period, Coffin assisted hundreds of runaway slaves, often by lodging them in his Ohio home across the river from Kentucky and not far downriver from Virginia. Kentucky and Virginia remained slave states until slavery was abolished after the American Civil War.

In his final decade, Coffin traveled around the Midwest, as well as overseas to France and Great Britain, where he helped form aid societies to provide food, clothing, funds and education to former slaves. Coffin retired from public life in the 1870s, and wrote an autobiography, Reminiscences of Levi Coffin, published in 1876, a year before his death.

== Early life and education ==
Coffin was born on a farm in Guilford County, North Carolina, on October 28, 1798. The only son of Prudence (Williams) and Levi Coffin Sr., he had six sisters. Both of his parents were devout Quakers and attended the historic New Garden Friends Meeting. Coffin's father was born in Massachusetts during the 1760s and migrated from Nantucket to North Carolina, where he farmed with other Quakers in the New Garden community.

As Coffin later explained in his autobiography, Reminiscences of Levi Coffin (1876), he inherited his anti-slavery views from his parent and grandparents, who had never owned slaves. The teachings of John Woolman (who believed that slaveholding was not fair) influenced the Coffin family. Coffin's parents probably met Woolman in 1767 during religious meetings held near their New Garden home with other non-slaveholding Quaker families. His cousin, Vestal Coffin, probably attended the meeting and beginning as early as 1819, became one of the earliest Quakers to help slaves escape from North Carolina.

Educated at his rural home, Coffin received little, if any, formal schooling. Coffin related how he became an abolitionist at the age of seven when he asked a slave who was in a chain gang why he was bound. The man replied that it was to prevent him from escaping and returning to his wife and children. The event disturbed Coffin, who understood the consequences of a father being taken away from his family.

By the time he reached the age of 15, Coffin was helping his family assist escaping slaves by bringing food to escapees hiding on his family's farm. As the repressive Fugitive Slave Law of 1793 became more rigorously enforced, the Coffin family needed to increase the secrecy under which they assisted escaping slaves, doing most of their illegal activities at night. Local scrutiny of known abolitionists worsened as North Carolina passed the 1804 Black Laws. By the early 1820s, Quakers in North Carolina were being openly persecuted by those who suspected them of helping runaway slaves. Nonetheless, in 1821 Coffin and his cousin, Vestal, established a Sunday School to teach slaves to read the Bible. The plan proved short-lived; slaveholders soon forced the school to close.

As persecution worsened, thousands of Quakers left North Carolina for what had been the Northwest Territory in Coffin's childhood, where slavery had been prohibited since the country's founding, then affirmed by the states created there. Plus, land was less expensive. (A large Quaker community that had already settled in what became Ohio and Indiana had been influential in securing a territorial ban on slavery.) In 1822 Coffin accompanied Benjamin White to Indiana. He stayed with the Whites for about a year. On returning to North Carolina, Coffin reported the prosperity in Indiana. Convinced that Quakers and slaveholders could not coexist, Coffin decided to move to Indiana.

== Marriage and family ==
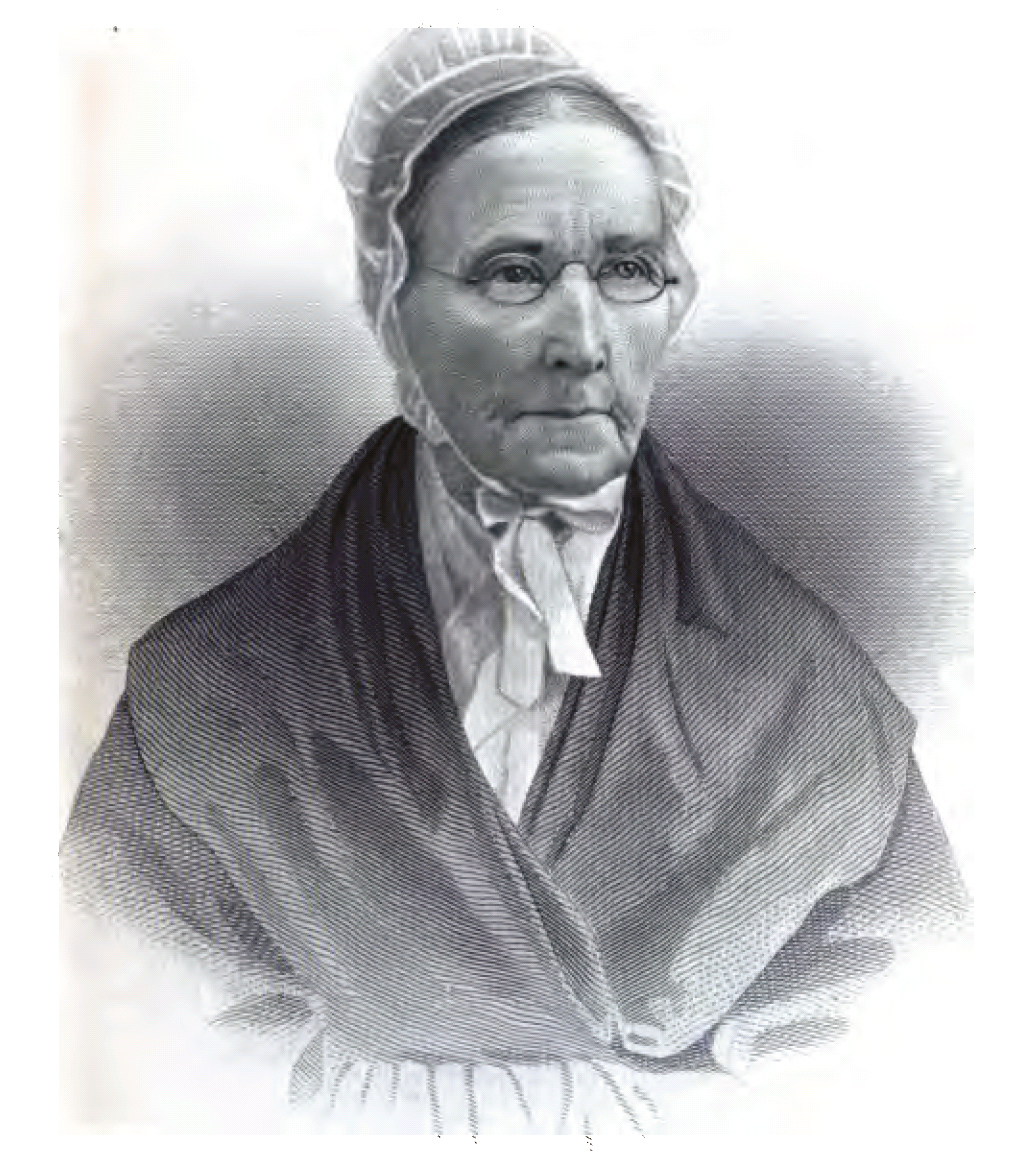
Catherine White Coffin, 1879

On October 28, 1824, Coffin married his long-time friend Catherine White at the Hopewell Friends Meetinghouse in North Carolina. Members of Catherine's family were also anti-slavery activists and abolitionists and it is likely she met Coffin because of these activities.

The couple postponed their move to Indiana after Catherine became pregnant with Jesse, the first of their six children, who was born in 1825. Coffin's parents moved to Indiana in 1825. Levi, Catherine, and their infant son followed his parents to Indiana the following year. In 1826, they settled in Newport (now Fountain City) in Wayne County, Indiana.

Like her husband, Catherine actively assisted fugitive slaves, including providing food, clothing, and a safe haven in the Coffin home. As Levi commented on his wife's humanitarian work, "Her sympathy for those in distress never tired, and her effort in their behalf never abated. Catherine White became known as Aunt Katie to slaves on the run."

== Career ==
=== Indiana ===
Coffin continued to farm after moving to Indiana and within a year of his arrival he opened the first dry-goods store in Newport. In later years Coffin credited the success of his business, which he expanded in the 1830s, with providing him the ability to become heavily involved in the costly enterprise of the Underground Railroad, a risky enterprise that provided a network of stopover sites for fugitive slaves as they traveled north into Canada.

Although the term "Underground Railroad" did not come into use until the 1830s, the network was operating in Indiana by the early 1820s. According to Coffin, not long after moving to Newport his home became one of the Underground Railroad stops. A large community of free blacks also lived near Newport, where fugitive slaves would hide before continuing north, but they were frequently recaptured because their hiding places were well known to the slave catchers. Coffin made contact with the local black community and made them aware of his willingness to hide runaways in his home to better protect them.

Coffin began sheltering fugitive slaves in his Indiana home during the winter of 1826–27. Word of his activities quickly spread throughout the community. Although many had previously been afraid to participate, some of his neighbors joined the effort after seeing his success at avoiding problems. The group formed a more formal route to move the fugitives from stop to stop until they reached Canada. Coffin referred to the system as the "mysterious road" and as time progressed the number of escaping slaves increased. Coffin estimated that, on average, he helped one hundred escape annually. The Coffin home became the convergent point of three major escape routes from Madison and New Albany, Indiana, and Cincinnati, Ohio. On some occasions when runaways gathered at his home, two wagons were required to transport them further north. Coffin moved the escaping slaves to the next stops along the route during the night. Coffin had numerous collaborators. In Madison, George DeBaptiste's barber shop was a key nerve center in the 1830s and 1840s.

Slave hunters frequently threatened Coffin's life. Many of his friends who feared for his safety tried to dissuade him from his covert activities by warning him of the danger to his family and business. Coffin, who was deeply moved by his religious convictions, later explained his rationale for continuing the effort:

After listening quietly to these counselors, I told them that I felt no condemnation for anything that I had ever done for the fugitive slaves. If by doing my duty and endeavoring to fulfill the injunctions of the Bible, I injured my business, then let my business go. As to my safety, my life was in the hands of my Divine Master, and I felt that I had his approval. I had no fear of the danger that seemed to threaten my life or my business. If I was faithful to duty, and honest and industrious, I felt that I would be preserved, and that I could make enough to support my family.

When neighbors who were opposed to his activity boycotted his store, Coffin's business experienced a period of poor performance; however, as the local population grew, the majority of the new arrivals supported the anti-slavery movement and Coffin's business prospered. He made a substantial investment in the Second State Bank of Indiana, established in 1833, and became a director of the bank's Richmond, Indiana, branch. In 1836 he expanded his business to include a mill that processed flax seed used to produce linseed oil. He also established a hog-butchering operation, opened a paint shop, and eventually acquired 250 acres (100 hectares) of land.

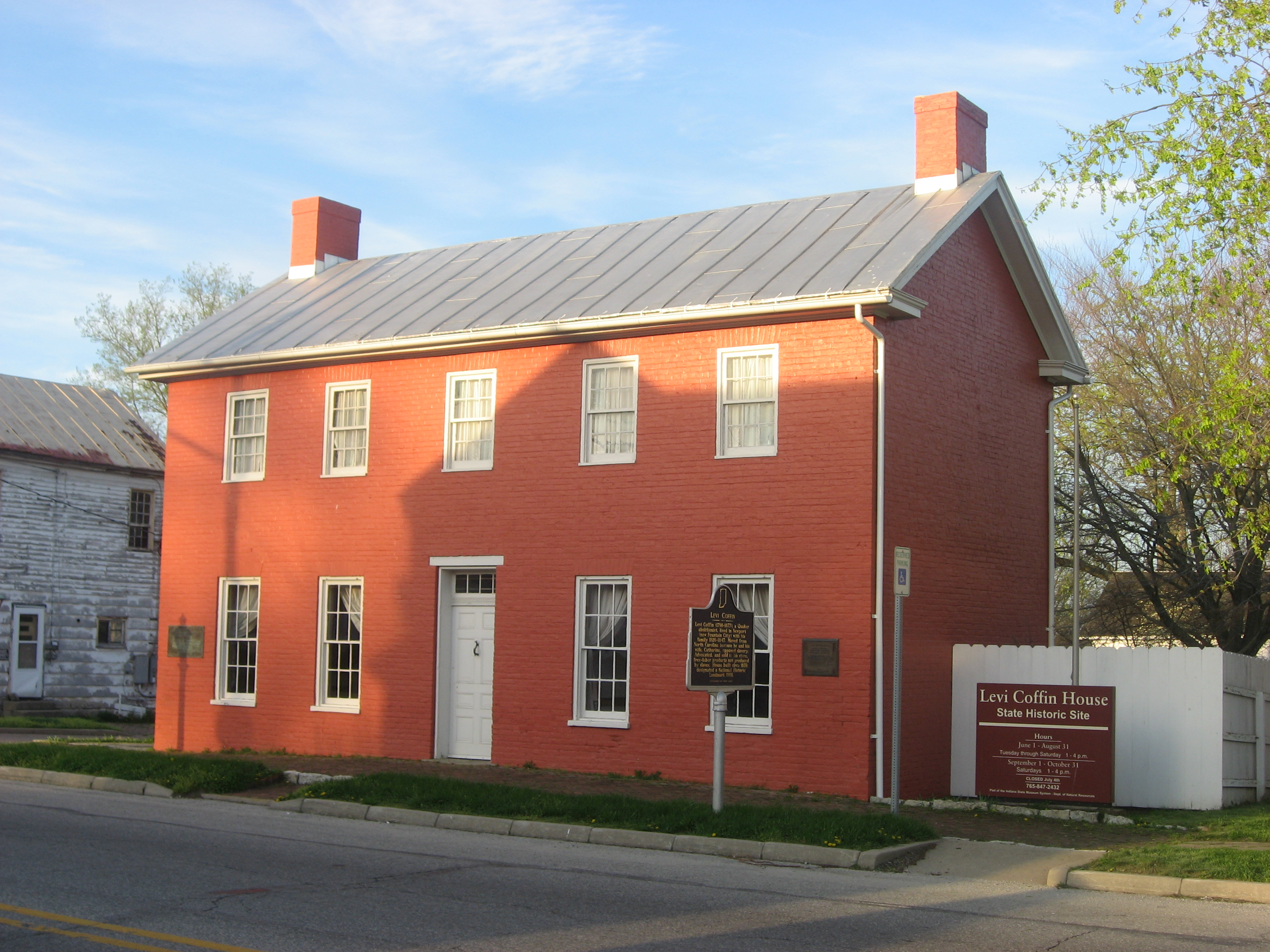
Levi Coffin's Newport home

In 1838 Coffin built a two-story, Federal-style brick home as his family's residence in Newport. Because the Levi Coffin House, its present-day name, had so many fugitives passing through it, the home became known as the "Grand Central Station" of the Underground Railroad. The Coffin house had several modifications made to create better hiding places for the runaway slaves. A secret door installed in the maids' quarters on the second floor provided access for fourteen people to hide in a narrow crawlspace between the walls. The hiding space could be used when slave hunters came to the Coffin home in search of runaways. Because Coffin demanded to see search warrants and slave-ownership papers before allowing entry to his home, it was never searched and escaping slaves had been transported to other locations by the time the slave hunters returned with the documents.

During the 1840s, pressure was brought to bear on the Quaker communities that helped escaping slaves. In 1842 the leaders of the Religious Society of Friends (Quaker) advised their members to cease membership in abolitionist societies and end activities assisting runaway slaves. The leaders insisted that legal emancipation was the best course of action. Coffin continued to take an active role in assisting escaping slaves, and the following year the Quaker society expelled him from membership. Coffin and other Quakers who supported his activities separated and formed the Antislavery Friends; the two rival groups remained separate until a reunification occurred in 1851.

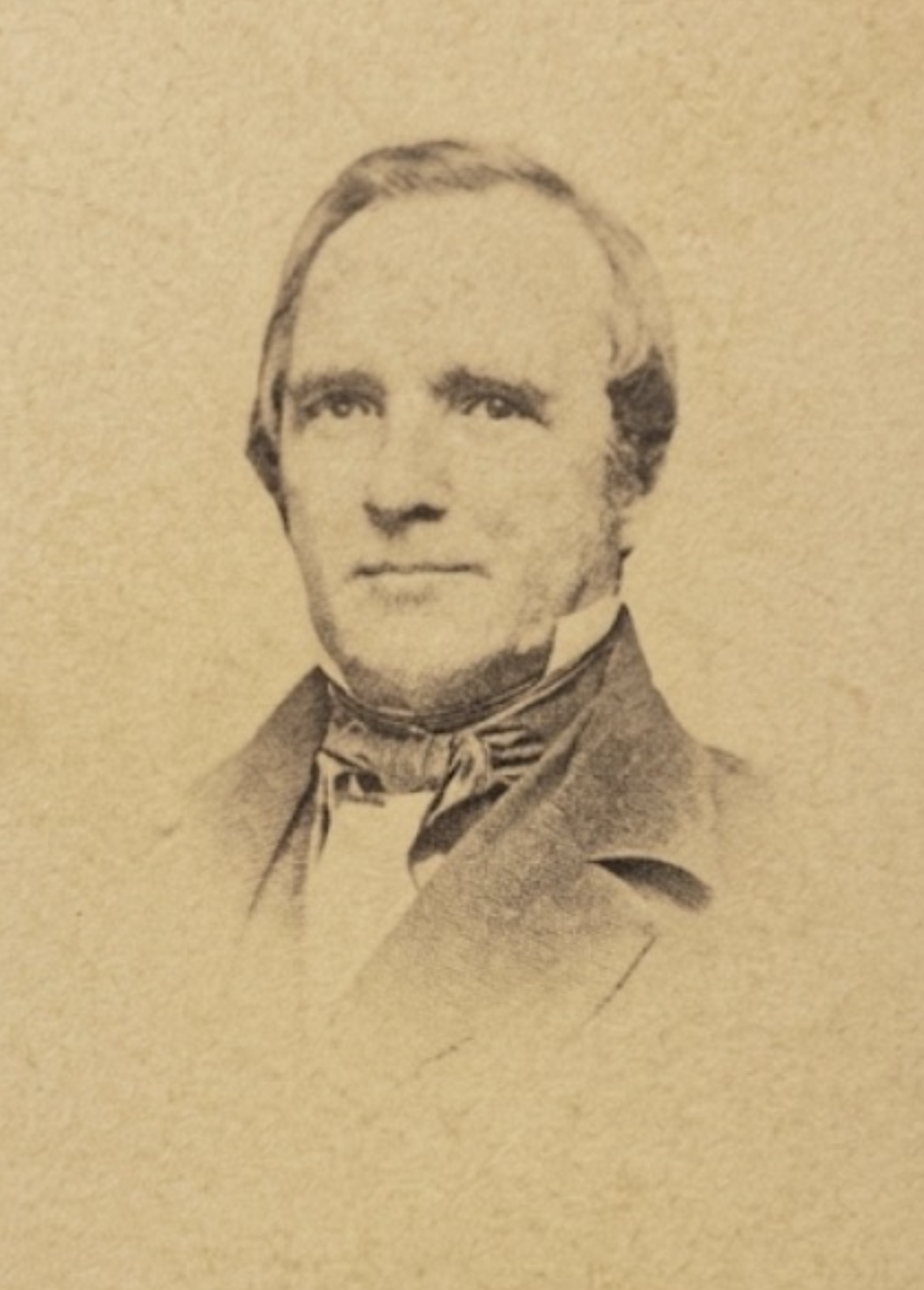
Levi Coffin, ca. 1840s - 1850s

Despite the opposition, the Coffin family's desire to help the runaway slaves only increased. Coffin's wife, Catherine, who was also dedicated to the effort, organized a sewing society that met at their home to produce clothing to give to the runaways. She also provided meals and shelter to runaway slaves in the Coffin home. Other aid was obtained from neighbors and others who were sympathetic to the cause, but unwilling take the fugitives into their homes. Through these activities, Coffin was able to secure a steady supply of goods to assist in the ongoing operations.

Over the years, Coffin came to realize that many of the goods he sold in his business were produced with slave labor. Through his travels Coffin learned of organizations in Philadelphia and New York City that only sold goods produced with free (non-slave) labor. He began to purchase stock from these organizations and marketed free-labor goods to his fellow abolitionists, though the products provided him with little profit.

Free-labor proponents in the East also wanted to create a similar organization in the western states. In the 1840s, members of the Salem Free Produce Association approached Coffin to see if he would be interested in managing the proposed Western Free Produce Association. At first he declined, saying he lacked the money required to fund the venture, and that he did not want to move into the city. In 1845 a group of abolitionist businessmen opened a wholesale mercantile business in Cincinnati and the Free Produce Association raised $3,000 (~$98,458 in 2025) to help stock the new warehouse with goods. Different groups continued to pressure Coffin to accept a position as the new business's director, claiming there were no other western abolitionists qualified to manage the enterprise. Reluctantly, he finally agreed to oversee the warehouse for five years, in which time he could train someone else to run it, and in 1847 Levi and Catherine Coffin moved to Ohio.

=== Cincinnati ===
Coffin moved to the Cincinnati area in 1847, where he took over the management of a wholesale warehouse of free-labor goods. With the intention of returning to Newport, Indiana, after fulfilling his obligation in Cincinnati, Coffin rented out his Newport business and made arrangements for his Indiana home to continue serving as an Underground Railroad stop. At Cincinnati his first task was working with the eastern organizations to set up a steady supply of free-labor goods for the business. The enterprise's ongoing problem was the poor quality of its goods. Coffin had difficulty procuring free goods, such as cotton, sugar, and spices, whose quality was competitive with the goods produced by slave labor. With inferior quality goods to sell, he had a difficult time finding purchasers for the goods. The problem plagued the business for years, causing the enterprise constant financial struggles.

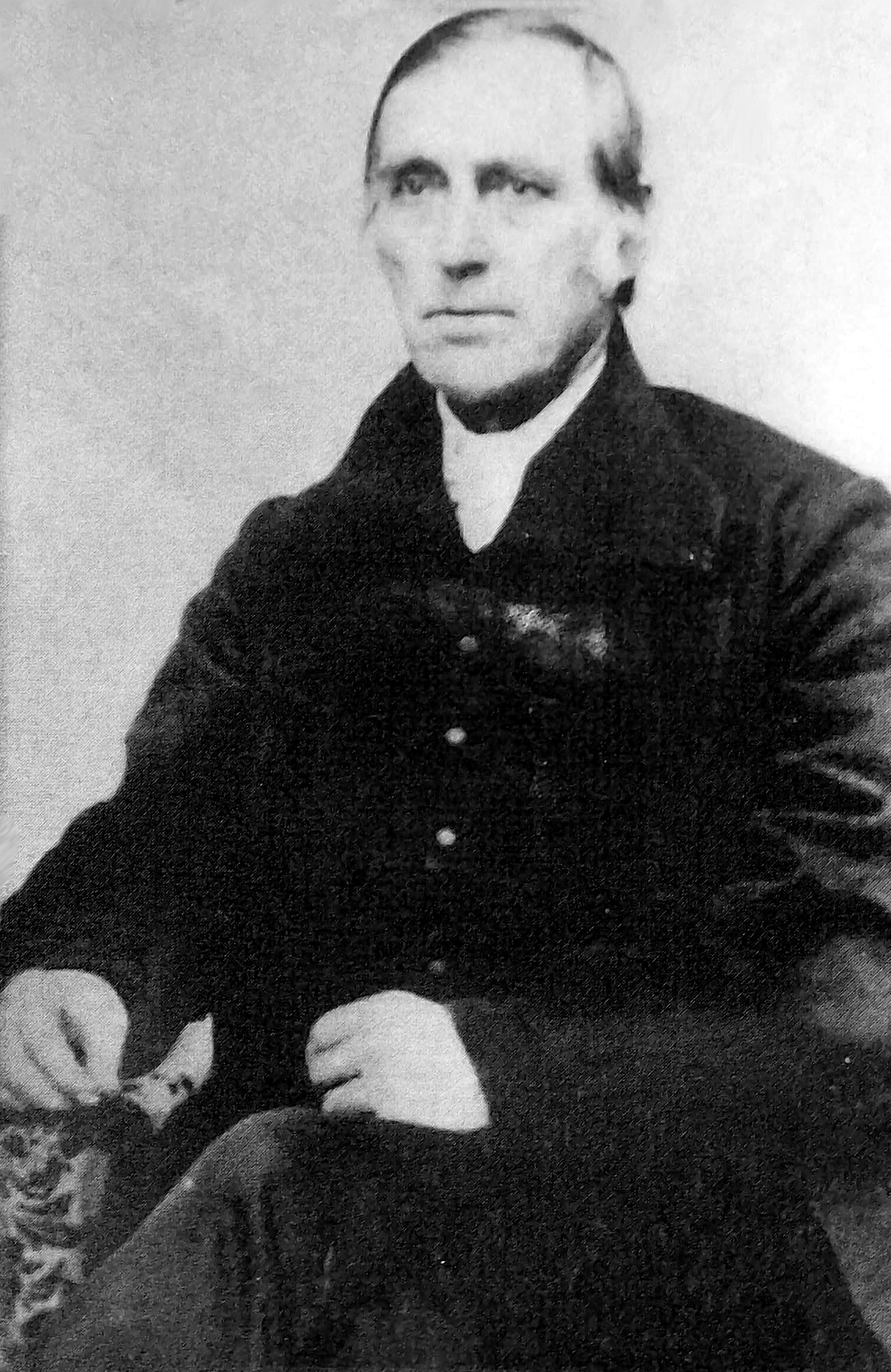
Levi Coffin, ca. 1864

The problem of obtaining good-quality free-labor products forced Coffin to travel south to seek out plantations that did not use slave labor to produce their goods. He met with only limited success. Coffin located a cotton plantation in Mississippi, where the owner had freed all his slaves and hired them as free laborers. The plantation struggled financially because it had no equipment to automate cotton production. Coffin helped the owner purchase a cotton gin that greatly increased the plantation's productivity and provided a steady supply of cotton for Coffin's association. The cotton was shipped to Cincinnati, where it was spun into cloth and sold. Other trips to Tennessee and Virginia were less successful, although he did succeed in spreading the word about the free-labor goods movement.

Despite his constant attention to the business, the poor supply and insufficient supply of free-labor products proved to be insurmountable, making it impossible for Coffin to find a replacement to run the company so that he could return to Indiana. The company remained in business primarily through the financial support of wealthy benefactors. Coffin sold the business in 1857, after deciding it would be impossible to maintain a profitable business.

Cincinnati already had a large anti-slavery movement who had violent conflicts with slavery proponents in the years before Coffin moved to the city. Coffin purchased a new home at the corner of Elm and Sixth Streets and continued to be active in the Underground Railroad. He also set up a new safe house in the city and helped organize a larger network in the area. At first he was very cautious about helping escaping slaves in the area until he was able to find local people he could trust and the community learned that it could trust him.

Although Coffin and his wife moved several times during their years in Cincinnati, they finally settled at a home on Wehrman Street. With the large home's rooms rented out for boarding and its many guests coming and going, the home provided an excellent place to operate an Underground Railroad stop without arousing much suspicion. When fugitives arrived they would be dressed as butlers, cooks, and other workers in uniforms that Catherine had created. Some mulattoes were able to pass as white guests. The most frequent disguise was a Quaker woman's attire; its high collar, long sleeves, gloves, veil, and a large, wide-brimmed hat could completely hide its wearer when their head was tilted slightly downward.

One of the classic account of slaves that escaped on the Underground Railroad was Harriet Beecher Stowe's fictional work, Uncle Tom's Cabin, which relates the story of Eliza Harris, a young slave girl who escaped the South by crossing the Ohio River on a winter night. Barefooted and carrying her baby, the fictional Eliza was exhausted and nearly dead when she reached safety. After receiving food, clothing, new shoes, and shelter from Stowe's fictional Quaker couple, Simeon and Rachael Halliday, Eliza continued her journey to freedom in Canada. Stowe, who was living in the city at the time, was acquainted with the Coffins, who may have been the inspiration for the Halliday couple in her novel.

Coffin's role began to change as the American Civil War approached. In 1854 he made a trip to Canada to visit a community of escaped slaves and offer assistance. He also helped found a Cincinnati orphanage for Black children. When the war broke out in 1861, Coffin and his group began preparation to help the wounded. As a Quaker pacifist he was opposed to war, but supported the Union. Coffin and his wife spent almost every day at Cincinnati's military hospital helping to care for the wounded. The Coffins prepared large quantities of coffee, distributed it freely to the soldiers, and took many of them into their home.

In 1863 Coffin became an agent for the Western Freedman's Aid Society, which offered assistance to the slaves who were freed during the war. As Union troops moved into the South, Coffin's group coordinated aid to slaves who had escaped to Union territory and began collecting food and other goods to distribute to former slaves who were now behind the Union lines. Coffin also petitioned the U.S. government to create the Freedmen's Bureau to assist the freed slaves. After the war he became involved in helping freed slaves establish businesses and obtain an education. In 1864, as a leader of the Freedman's Aid Society, he sought aid in Great Britain, where his advocacy led to the formation of the Englishman's Freedmen's Aid Society.

== Later years ==
After the war Coffin raised more than $1,000 in one year for the Western Freedman's Aid Society to provide food, clothing, money, and other aid to the newly freed slave population in the United States. In 1867 he served as a delegate to the International Anti-Slavery Conference in Paris.

Coffin did not enjoy being in the public eye and considered his job soliciting financial aid as begging for money, which he thought to be demeaning. He stated in his autobiography that he gladly gave up the position once a new leader for the organization was selected. Coffin became concerned about giving money freely to all blacks, some of whom he believed would never be able to care for themselves unless adequate education and farms were provided. He also believed the Society should give their limited resources only to those who were best able to benefit from them. The Society continued to operate until 1870, the same year that black men were guaranteed the right to vote under the Fifteenth Amendment to the U.S. Constitution.

Coffin spent his final years in retirement from public life. He spent his final year writing about his experiences and activities of the Underground Railroad. In his autobiography Coffin remarked, "I resign my office and declare the operations of the Underground Railroad at an end." Historians consider Reminiscences of Levi Coffin, published in 1876, among the best firsthand accounts of the Underground Railroad.

== Death and legacy ==
Coffin died on September 16, 1877, at around 6:30 p.m. at his home in Avondale, Ohio. His funeral was held at the Friends Meeting House of Cincinnati. The Cincinnati Daily Gazette reported that the crowd was too large to be accommodated indoors; hundreds had to remain outside. Four of Coffin's eight pallbearers were free blacks who had worked with him on the Underground Railroad. Coffin was interred in Cincinnati's Spring Grove Cemetery in an unmarked grave. Coffin's wife, Catherine, who died four years later on May 22, 1881, is buried in Spring Grove Cemetery as well.

Known for his fearlessness in assisting runaway slaves, Coffin served as a role model who encouraged his neighbors to help contribute to the effort, although many were wary of providing them with a safe haven in their homes as he and his wife did. Best known for his leadership in aiding fugitive slaves, Coffin was first referred to as the unofficial "President of the Underground Railroad" by a slavecatcher who said, "There's an underground railroad going on here, and Levi's the president of it." The informal title became commonly used among other abolitionists and some ex-slaves.

Historians have estimated that the Coffins helped approximately 2,000 escaping slaves during their twenty years in Indiana and an estimated 1,300 more after their move to Cincinnati. (Coffin did not keep records, but estimated the number to be around 3,000.) When questioned about his motives for aided fugitive slaves, Coffin once replied: "The Bible, in bidding us to feed the hungry and clothe the naked, said nothing about color, and I should try to follow out the teachings of that good book."

On July 11, 1902, African Americans erected a 6-foot (1.8 m) tall monument at Coffin's previously unmarked gravesite in Cincinnati.

The Levi Coffin House in Fountain City, Indiana, was named a National Historic Landmark and added to the National Register of Historic Places in 1966. Indiana's state government purchased the Coffin home in 1967 and had it restored to its original condition. The home features the actual secret hiding places where slaves would hide while on the run. Also featured at the home is an original false-bottom wagon where slaves would hide while Coffin would take them to their next destination without being discovered. The Coffin House was ranked as "one of the nation's Top 25 Historical Sites" by the History Channel. In 2016, the Smithsonian named the Levi Coffin House Interpretive Center "one of 12 new museums around the world to visit," while the Indiana Office of Tourism Development voted it as one of the top museums in the State of Indiana. The home opened to the public as a historic site in 1970.

== See also ==
- Peter Fossett, former enslaved person at Monticello who was a conductor of Coffin's Underground Railroad
