= Fountain City, Indiana =

- Town
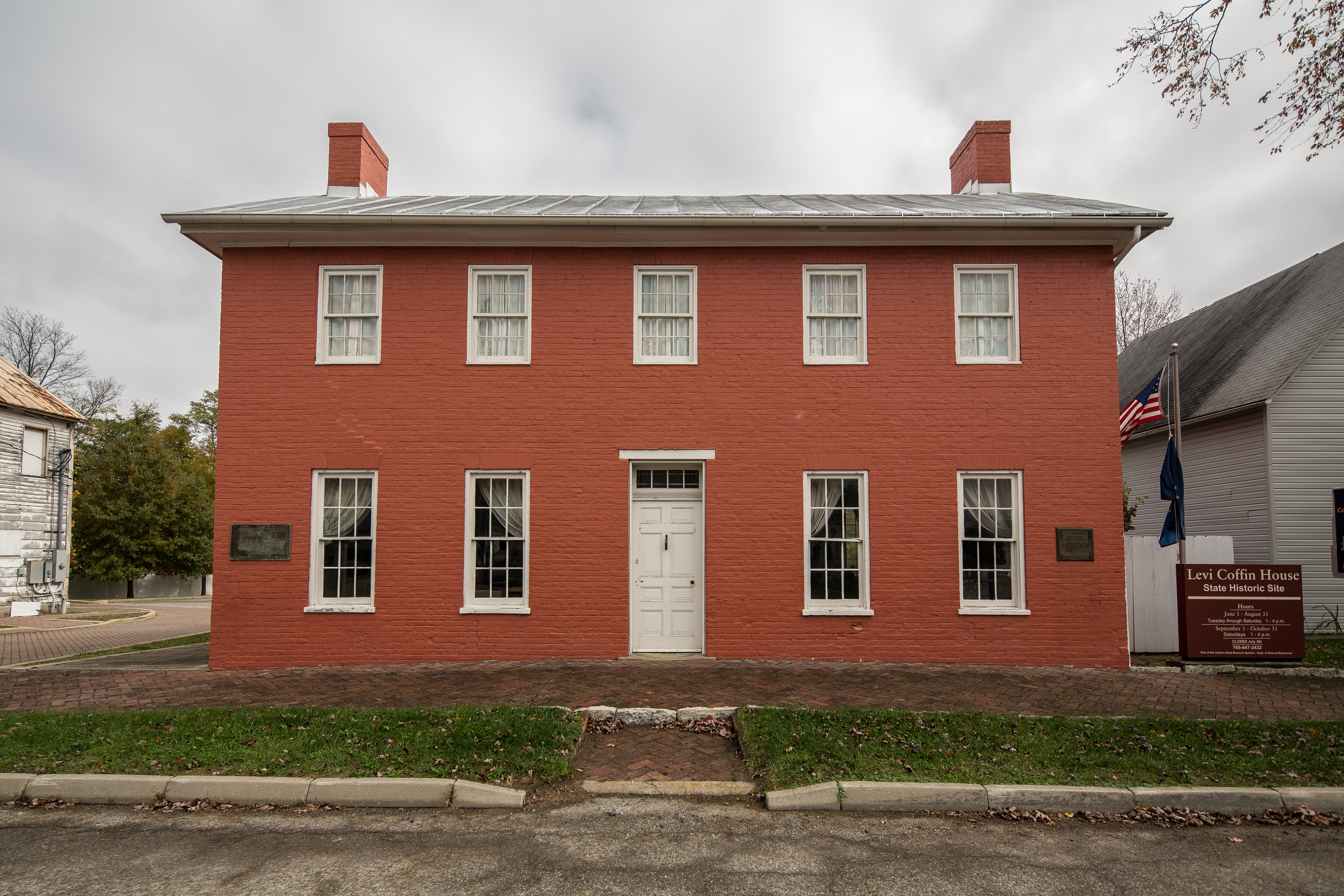

- Location of Fountain City in Wayne County, Indiana.
- Coordinates: 39°57′17″N 84°55′09″W
- Country: United States
- State: Indiana
- County: Wayne
- Township: New Garden

Area
  - Total: 0.26 sq mi (0.68 km^{2})
  - Land: 0.26 sq mi (0.68 km^{2})
  - Water: 0 sq mi (0.00 km^{2})
- Elevation: 1,102 ft (336 m)

Population (2020)
  - Total: 714
  - Density: 2,710/sq mi (1,045/km^{2})
- Time zone: UTC-5 (Eastern (EST))
  - Summer (DST): UTC-5 (EST)
- ZIP code: 47341
- Area code: 765
- FIPS code: 18-25090
- GNIS feature ID: 2396944
- Website: fountaincity.municipalimpact.com

Fountain City, formerly Newport, is a town in New Garden Township, Wayne County, in the U.S. state of Indiana. The population was 714 at the 2020 census.

== History ==
Fountain City was originally called New Garden, and under that name was laid out in 1818. New Garden became Newport in 1834, which was renamed Fountain City in 1878, named for its natural springs. It was incorporated as a town in 1844.

The Fountain City post office has been in operation since 1878.

=== Historic site ===
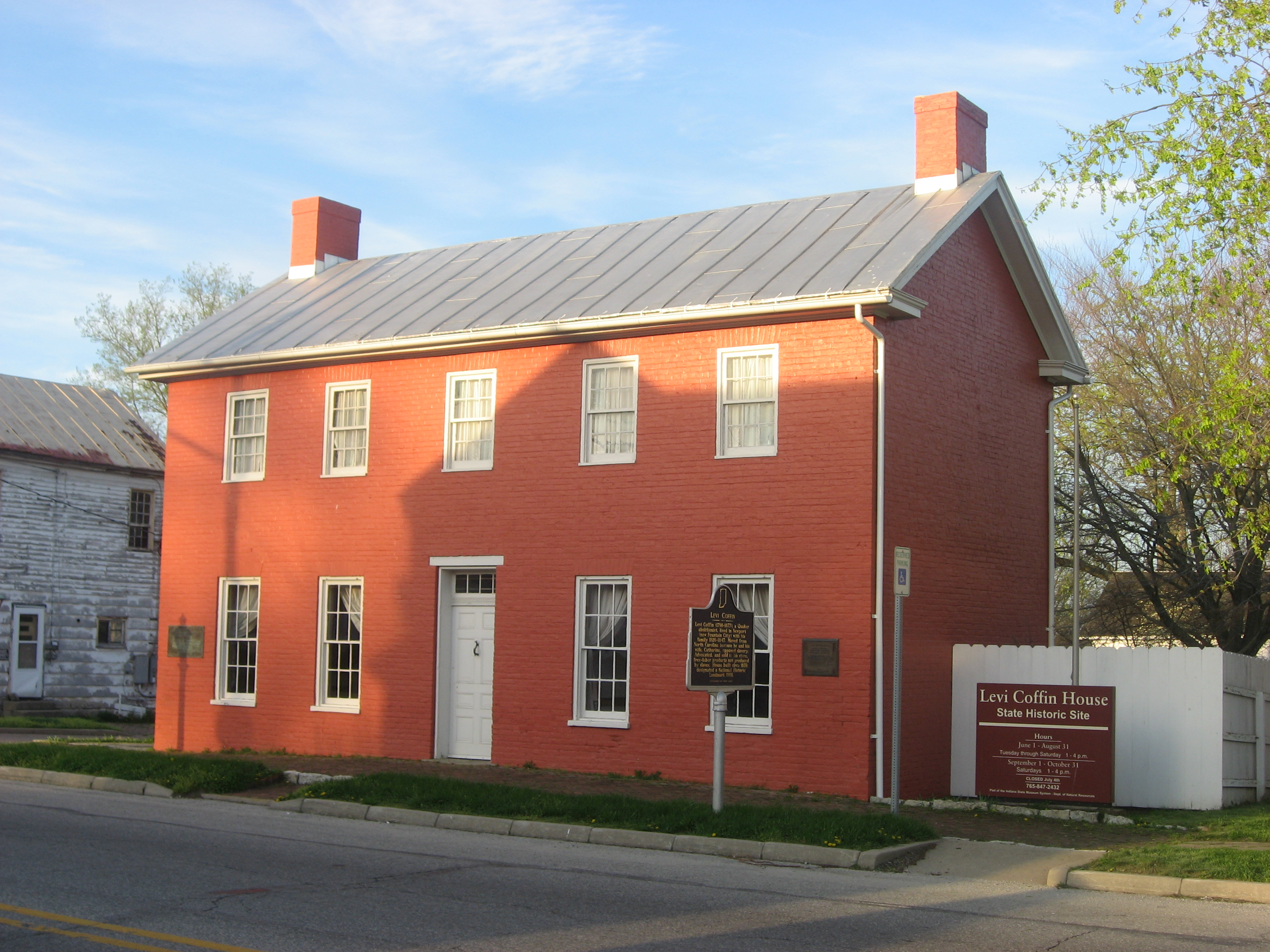
Levi Coffin House, Fountain City, Indiana

The Levi Coffin House, home of Quaker abolitionist Levi Coffin and his wife Catherine, was an important stop on the Underground Railroad. Coffin was sometimes known as the "president" of the Underground Railroad. It is now operated as an Indiana State Historic Site.

== Geography ==
According to the 2010 census, Fountain City has a total area of 0.26 square miles (0.67 km^{2}), all land.

== Demographics ==
Historical population
Census	Pop.	Note	%±
1880	471		—
1890	492		4.5%
1900	455		−7.5%
1910	448		−1.5%
1920	375		−16.3%
1930	480		28.0%
1940	491		2.3%
1950	588		19.8%
1960	833		41.7%
1970	852		2.3%
1980	839		−1.5%
1990	766		−8.7%
2000	735		−4.0%
2010	796		8.3%
2020	714		−10.3%
U.S. Decennial Census

=== 2010 census ===
As of the census of 2010, there were 796 people, 311 households, and 221 families living in the town. The population density was 3,061.5 inhabitants per square mile (1,182.1/km^{2}). There were 343 housing units at an average density of 1,319.2 units per square mile (509.3 units/km^{2}). The racial makeup of the town was 97.2% White, 0.9% African American, 0.1% Asian, and 1.8% from two or more races. Hispanic or Latino of any race were 0.1% of the population.

There were 311 households, of which 39.5% had children under the age of 18 living with them, 48.6% were married couples living together, 15.1% had a female householder with no husband present, 7.4% had a male householder with no wife present, and 28.9% were non-families. 24.4% of all households were made up of individuals, and 8.7% had someone living alone who was 65 years of age or older. The average household size was 2.56 and the average family size was 3.00.

The median age in the town was 37.6 years. 27.6% of residents were under the age of 18; 9% were between the ages of 18 and 24; 24.6% were from 25 to 44; 24.3% were from 45 to 64; and 14.6% were 65 years of age or older. The gender makeup of the town was 47.0% male and 53.0% female.

=== 2000 census ===
As of the census of 2000, there were 735 people, 291 households, and 212 families living in the town. The population density was 2,795.5 inhabitants per square mile (1,079.3/km^{2}). There were 309 housing units at an average density of 1,175.2 units per square mile (453.7 units/km^{2}). The racial makeup of the town was 97.69% White, 0.68% African American, 0.27% Asian, 0.27% from other races, and 1.09% from two or more races. Hispanic or Latino of any race were 0.27% of the population.

There were 291 households, out of which 33.7% had children under the age of 18 living with them, 58.8% were married couples living together, 11.3% had a female householder with no husband present, and 27.1% were non-families. 24.4% of all households were made up of individuals, and 10.0% had someone living alone who was 65 years of age or older. The average household size was 2.53 and the average family size was 2.95.

In the town, the population was spread out, with 26.0% under the age of 18, 8.3% from 18 to 24, 29.3% from 25 to 44, 22.4% from 45 to 64, and 14.0% who were 65 years of age or older. The median age was 36 years. For every 100 females, there were 95.0 males. For every 100 females age 18 and over, there were 94.3 males.

The median income for a household in the town was $34,722, and the median income for a family was $40,865. Males had a median income of $32,031 versus $21,000 for females. The per capita income for the town was $15,669. About 7.4% of families and 8.8% of the population were below the poverty line, including 10.3% of those under age 18 and 10.9% of those age 65 or over.

== Notable people ==
- Levi Coffin, abolitionist and conductor of the Underground Railroad
- Charles Conner, painter.
- William Penn Nixon, publisher and politician.
- Stephen Venard, lawman.
