= Abner M. Bradbury =

American politician from Indiana

Member of the Indiana Senate from the Wayne County district
- In office December 5, 1836 – December 3, 1838
- In office December 2, 1844 – December 6, 1847
- Succeeded by: David P. Holloway

Personal details
- Born: July 8, 1798 Northwest Territory, U.S.
- Died: September 17, 1885 (aged 87) Cambridge City, Indiana, U.S.
- Resting place: Jacksonburg Cemetery, Jacksonburg, Indiana, U.S.
- Party: Whig Party
- Spouse: Mary Boyd
- Children: 13
- Occupation: Politician

Military service
- Allegiance: United States
- Branch/service: Indiana Militia
- Years of service: 1823
- Rank: Lieutenant colonel

Abner M. Bradbury (July 8, 1798 – September 17, 1885) was an American politician. Bradbury represented Wayne County, Indiana in the Indiana House of Representatives and the Indiana Senate representing the Whig Party.

== Early life and career ==
Abner M. Bradbury was born in the part of the Northwest Territory that would shortly become Ohio on July 8, 1798. In 1814 or 1815, he moved to Wayne County, Indiana, settling with his father on a farm along Morgan Creek Road.

Bradbury worked as a store clerk in Richmond from June 1821 until the summer of 1822. In 1821, he married Mary Boyd. Boyd and Bradbury met while he was living in Richmond. They would go on to have 13 children. Bradbury moved to Greens Fork, Indiana, where he working in a fulling mill. As of 1823, he was serving in the Indiana Militia. He earned the rank of lieutenant colonel.

== Career ==
In 1829, Bradbury was named deputy sheriff and a justice of the peace of Wayne County. That same year, he became postmaster of Jacksonburg, Indiana, serving until 1833.

=== Political career ===
He served in the Indiana House of Representatives from 1832 until 1835. He lost his reelection bid. In 1836, he was elected to the Indiana State Senate. He assumed office in December 1836 and left at the end of his term in December 1838. He ran for election again in 1844, winning, and assuming office until December 1847.

Bradbury was associate judge of Indiana from 1848 until 1852, when the position was abolished. Also in 1848, Bradbury was a delegate at the national convention for the Whig Party. In his free time, he advocated for the establishment and expansion of the Central State Hospital.

== Later life and death ==
Bradbury died in Cambridge City, Indiana on September 17, 1885. At the time of his death, he was one of the oldest residents in Wayne County. Bradbury is buried in Jacksonburg Cemetery in Jacksonburg, Indiana.

== Legacy ==
Bradbury's paper are held in the collection of the Indiana State Library.
