= Webster Township, Wayne County, Indiana =

Webster Township
- Township
- Location in Wayne County
- Coordinates: 39°53′53″N 84°57′18″W
- Country: United States
- State: Indiana
- County: Wayne

Government
  - Type: Indiana township

Area
  - Total: 14.94 sq mi (38.7 km^{2})
  - Land: 14.89 sq mi (38.6 km^{2})
  - Water: 0.05 sq mi (0.13 km^{2}) 0.33%
- Elevation: 1,043 ft (318 m)

Population (2020)
  - Total: 1,210
  - Density: 85.4/sq mi (33.0/km^{2})
- Time zone: UTC-5 (Eastern (EST))
  - Summer (DST): UTC-4 (EDT)
- Area code: 765
- GNIS feature ID: 454045
- Website: webstertwp.in

Webster Township is one of fifteen townships in Wayne County, Indiana, United States. As of the 2010 census, its population was 1,272 and it contained 552 housing units.

== History ==
Webster Township was organized in 1870.

== Geography ==
According to the 2010 census, the township has a total area of 14.94 square miles (38.7 km^{2}), of which 14.89 square miles (38.6 km^{2}) (or 99.67%) is land and 0.05 square miles (0.13 km^{2}) (or 0.33%) is water. The streams of Dover Run, High Brook, Long Creek, Nail Creek, Quill Creek, Single Creek, Spike Brook, Tie Run, Web Branch, Web Creek and Webster Creek run through this township.

=== Unincorporated towns ===
- Wayne at 39.8878252°N 84.9255172°W
- Webster at 39.9033804°N 84.9452399°W

(This list is based on USGS data and may include former settlements.)

=== Adjacent townships ===
- New Garden Township (northeast)
- Wayne Township (southeast)
- Center Township (southwest)
- Green Township (northwest)

=== Cemeteries ===
The township contains one cemetery, Dover.

=== Major highways ===
- U.S. Route 35
- Indiana State Road 38
