= Jacksonburg =

Jacksonburg may refer to:

- Jacksonburg, Indiana
- Jacksonburg, New Jersey
- Jacksonburg, New York
- Jacksonburg, Ohio
