= Center Township, Wayne County, Indiana =

Center Township
- Township
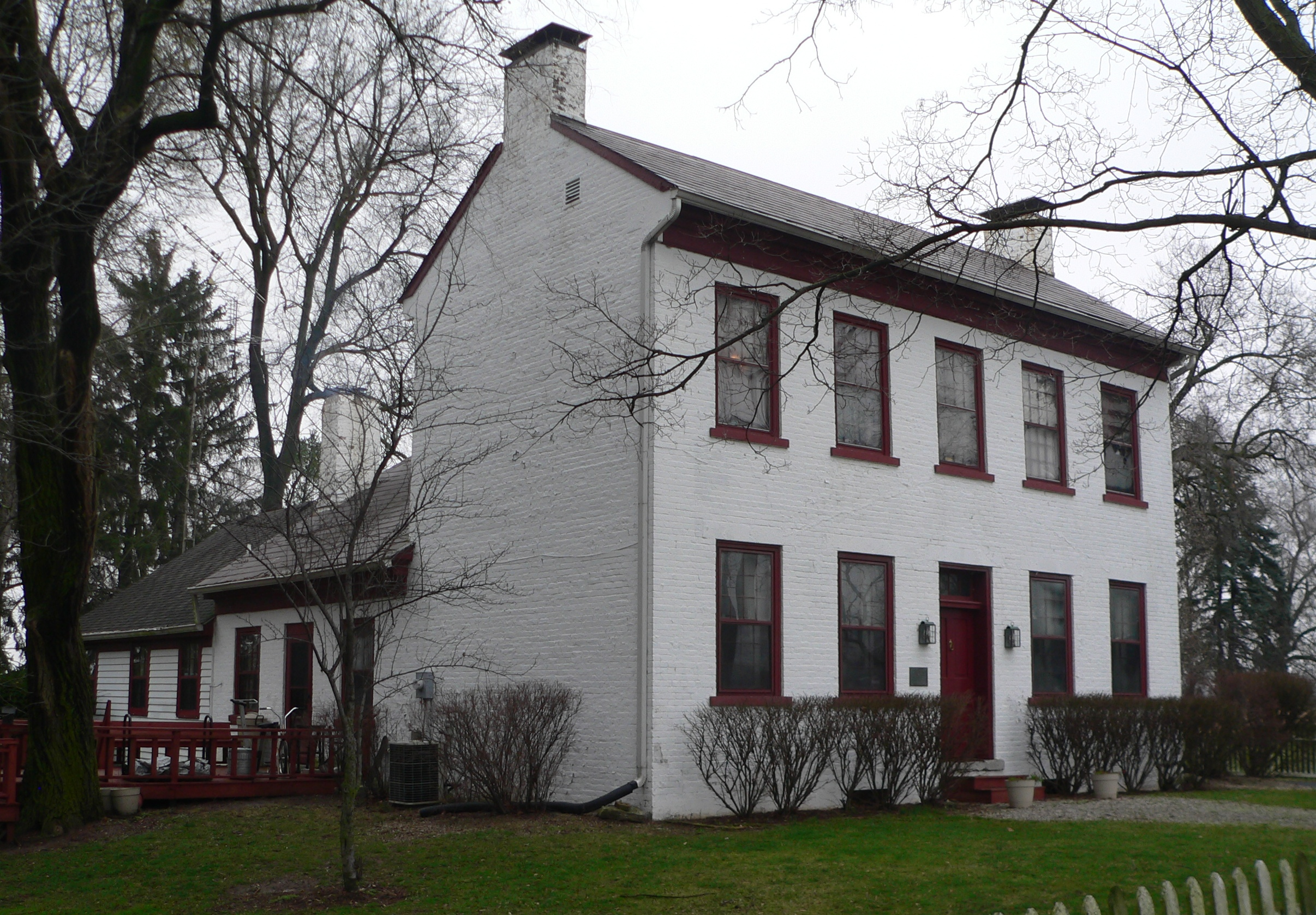
- The Lewis Jones House, a historic place located in Center Township

- Location in Wayne County
- Coordinates: 39°49′21″N 84°59′50″W
- Country: United States
- State: Indiana
- County: Wayne

Government
  - Type: Indiana township

Area
  - Total: 42.32 sq mi (109.6 km^{2})
  - Land: 42.03 sq mi (108.9 km^{2})
  - Water: 0.29 sq mi (0.75 km^{2}) 0.69%
- Elevation: 1,014 ft (309 m)

Population (2020)
  - Total: 7,324
  - Density: 180.3/sq mi (69.6/km^{2})
- Time zone: UTC-5 (Eastern (EST))
  - Summer (DST): UTC-4 (EDT)
- Area code: 765
- GNIS feature ID: 453196

Center Township is one of fifteen townships in Wayne County, Indiana, United States. As of the 2010 census, its population was 7,579 and it contained 3,204 housing units.

== History ==
Center Township was organized in 1817.

The Lewis Jones House, King-Dennis Farm, and Samuel G. Smith Farm are listed on the National Register of Historic Places.

== Geography ==
According to the 2010 census, the township has a total area of 42.32 square miles (109.6 km^{2}), of which 42.03 square miles (108.9 km^{2}) (or 99.31%) is land and 0.29 square miles (0.75 km^{2}) (or 0.69%) is water. The streams of Black Run, Bryant Creek, Center Run, Centrum Run, Cold Run, Cool Brook, Crown Creek, Far Run, Fork Creek, Free Run, Middle Run, Point Run, Rich Creek, Sleet Brook, Snow Run Brook and Winter Run run through this township.

=== Cities and towns ===
- Richmond (west edge)
- Centerville

=== Unincorporated towns ===
- Pinhook at 39.8156023°N 85.0571858°W
- West Grove at 39.8464356°N 85.0138521°W

(This list is based on USGS data and may include former settlements.)

=== Adjacent townships ===
- Green Township (north)
- Webster Township (northeast)
- Wayne Township (east)
- Boston Township (southeast)
- Abington Township (south)
- Washington Township (southwest)
- Harrison Township (west)
- Jackson Township (west)
- Clay Township (northwest)

=== Cemeteries ===
The township contains three cemeteries: Crown Hill, Crown Hill and West Grove.

=== Major highways ===
- Interstate 70
- U.S. Route 40
- State Road 38

== Education ==
Center Township is served by the Centerville-Center Township Public Library.
