= Pinhook, Indiana =

Pinhook, Indiana may refer to:

- Pinhook, Franklin County, Indiana
- Pinhook, LaPorte County, Indiana
- Pinhook, Lawrence County, Indiana
- Pinhook, Wayne County, Indiana
