= West Grove =

West Grove may refer to:

United States

Cities

- West Grove, Indiana
- West Grove, Iowa
- West Grove, New Jersey
- West Grove, Pennsylvania

Neighborhoods

- West Grove, also known as Black Grove, in Coconut Grove, Miami, Florida
- West Garden Grove, also known as West Grove, in Garden Grove, California

United Kingdom

- West Grove (Cardiff), a street in Wales
