= Cityview (Des Moines) =

Alternative newspaper in Iowa, US

CITYVIEW
- Type: Alternative newspaper
- Format: Tabloid
- Owner(s): Big Green Umbrella Media, Inc.
- Publisher: Shane Goodman
- Editor: Darren Tromblay
- Founded: 1992
- Headquarters: 5619 N.W. 86th St., Suite 600; Johnston, Iowa 50131; United States
- Circulation: 30,000 monthly
- Website: dmcityview.com

CITYVIEW is an alternative newspaper in the Des Moines, Iowa, area.

== History ==
The publication now known as Cityview has its roots in The Skywalker, a biweekly newspaper founded in 1983. Named for the city's iconic skywalk system, the startup publication was quickly purchased by Business Publications, publisher of the Business Record, a business-themed weekly started in 1981.

After nearly a decade under the ownership of Business Publications, owner Connie Wimer decided to launch a new weekly, aimed at transforming the paper in what was viewed as a conservative market. Cityview published its first edition in July 1992.

In the early 2000s, a rival alternative weekly known as Pointblank. In 2003, it was acquired by Greater Des Moines Publishing Co. (GDMPC), a wholly owned subsidiary of New West Newspapers Inc., whose primary owners were Gary Gerlach and Michael Gartner. In 2004, GDMPC purchased Cityview and merged the publication with Pointblank. The name of the older, better-established paper was retained as the name of the merged publications under its new company, Big Green Umbrella Media.

In 2021 the Daily Umbrella began publishing online with Monday through Friday news about less urgent and hopefully more amusing news than found elsewhere.

== Features ==
Cityview is known for its coverage of local restaurants, bars, and music. The paper includes columns by Gartner and by Carroll Daily Times Herald publisher Douglas Burns. Jim Duncan has written the food columns (Food Dude now) and art columns (Art News now) since the early 1990's and the business column Lunch with... for seven years. Its "Deals of the Day" are Des Moines' most comprehensive bargain hunting ideas for food goers.
