= Dalton Township =

Dalton Township may refer to the following places:

In Canada:

- Dalton Township, Ontario

In the United States:

- Dalton Township, Wayne County, Indiana
- Dalton Township, Michigan
