= Abington, Indiana =

- Unincorporated community and Census-designated place
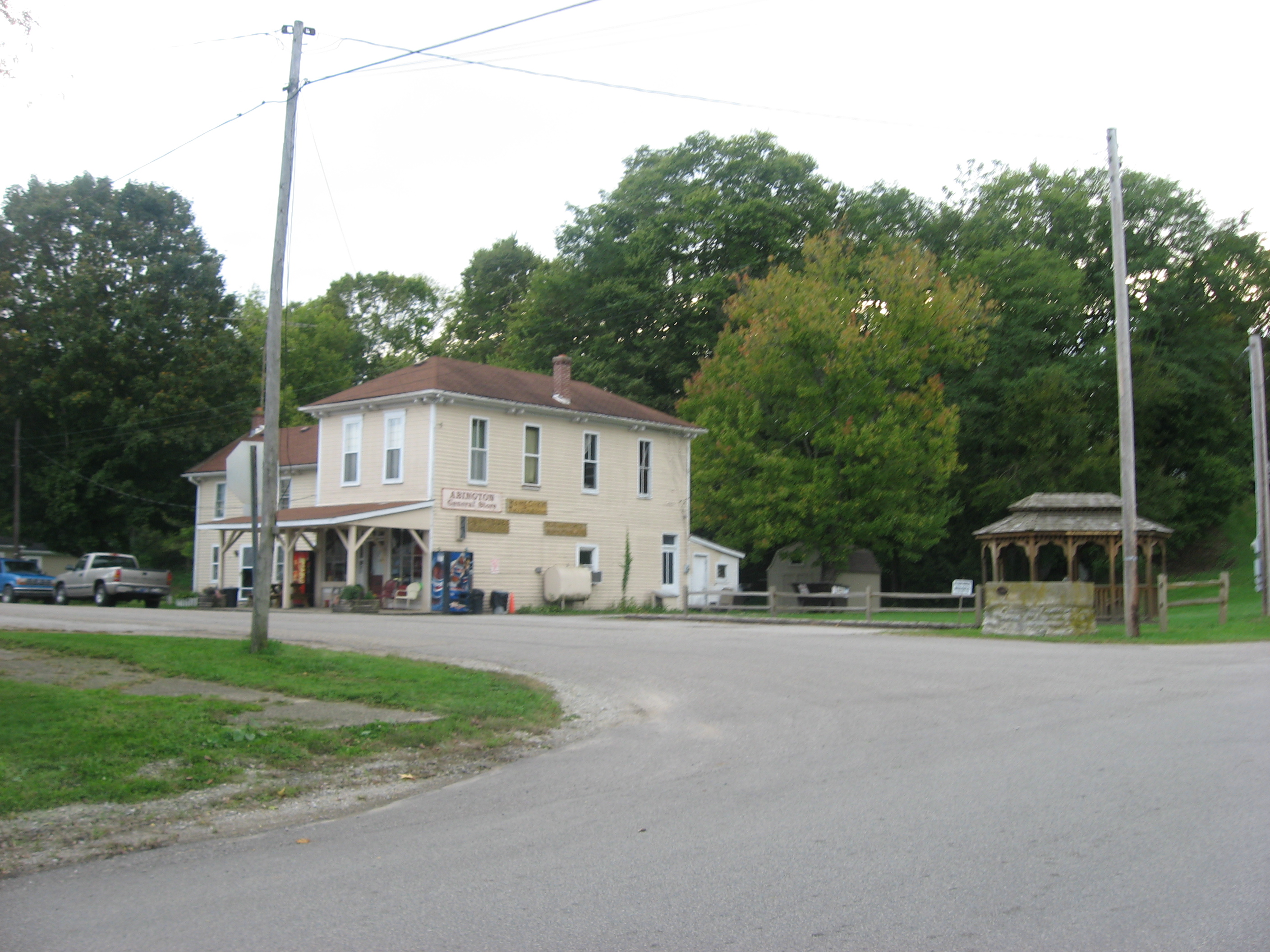
- Central Abington

- Location within Indiana Location within the United States
- Coordinates: 39°43′56″N 84°57′54″W
- Country: United States
- State: Indiana
- County: Wayne
- Township: Abington
- Elevation: 863 ft (263 m)
- Time zone: UTC-5 (Eastern (EST))
  - Summer (DST): UTC-4 (EDT)
- ZIP code: 47325
- Area code: 765
- GNIS feature ID: 2830576

Abington is an unincorporated community in Abington Township, Wayne County, in the U.S. state of Indiana.

== History ==
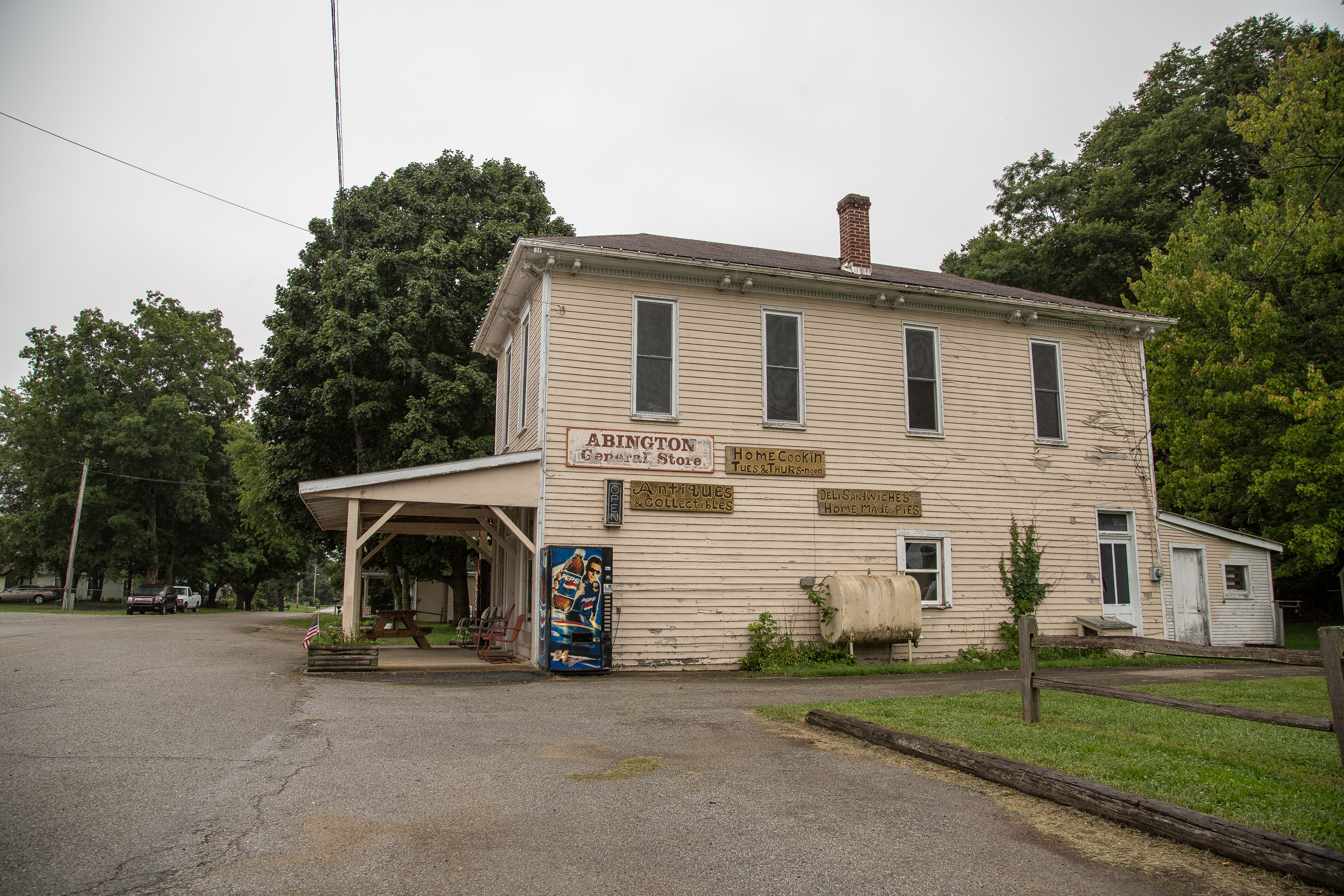
Abington, Indiana

Abington was laid out and platted in 1817.

A post office was established at Abington in 1824, and remained in operation until it was discontinued in 1903. The name of this Quaker settlement recalled the Abington Monthly Meeting of the Society of Friends located in Pennsylvania.

In 1890, the population was estimated as around 200 residents. In 1900, the population was 186.

By 1920, the population was 150. The population was 80 in 1940.

== Demographics ==
The United States Census Bureau delineated Abington as a census designated place in the 2022 American Community Survey.

== Notable person ==
- Orlando H. Manning, Lieutenant Governor of Iowa.

== See also ==
- Middleboro, Indiana
