= Greenwood, Wayne County, Indiana =

Greenwood
- Unincorporated community
- Location within Indiana Location within the United States
- Coordinates: 39°48′44″N 84°53′17″W
- Country: United States
- State: Indiana
- County: Wayne
- Township: Wayne
- Elevation: 1,014 ft (309 m)
- Time zone: UTC-5 (Eastern (EST))
  - Summer (DST): UTC-4 (EDT)
- ZIP code: 47374
- Area code: 765
- GNIS feature ID: 449057

Greenwood is an unincorporated community in Wayne Township, Wayne County, Indiana, United States.

It is located within the city limits of Richmond.
