= Webster, Indiana =

- Unincorporated community and Census-designated place
- Location within Indiana Location within the United States
- Coordinates: 39°54′05″N 84°56′34″W
- Country: United States
- State: Indiana
- County: Wayne
- Township: Webster
- Elevation: 1,079 ft (329 m)
- Time zone: UTC-5 (Eastern (EST))
  - Summer (DST): UTC-4 (EDT)
- ZIP code: 47392
- Area code: 765
- GNIS feature ID: 2830577

Webster is an unincorporated community in Webster Township, Wayne County, in the U.S. state of Indiana.

== History ==
Webster was laid out in about 1850. An old variant name of the community was called Dover. The post office at Webster has been in operation since 1851.

== Demographics ==
Historical population
| Census | Pop. | Note | %± |
|---|---|---|---|
| 2023 (est.) | 149 |

The United States Census Bureau defined Webster as a census designated place in the 2022 American Community Survey.
