= Franklin, Wayne County, Indiana =

Franklin
- Unincorporated community
- Location within Indiana Location within the United States
- Coordinates: 39°58′26″N 85°11′28″W
- Country: United States
- State: Indiana
- County: Wayne
- Township: Dalton
- Elevation: 1,096 ft (334 m)
- Time zone: UTC-5 (Eastern (EST))
  - Summer (DST): UTC-4 (EDT)
- ZIP code: 47346
- Area code: 765
- GNIS feature ID: 449869

Franklin is an unincorporated community in Dalton Township, Wayne County, in the U.S. state of Indiana.

== History ==
Franklin was platted in 1832. An old variant name of the community was called Nettle Creek.
