= King–Dennis Farm =

- U.S. National Register of Historic Places
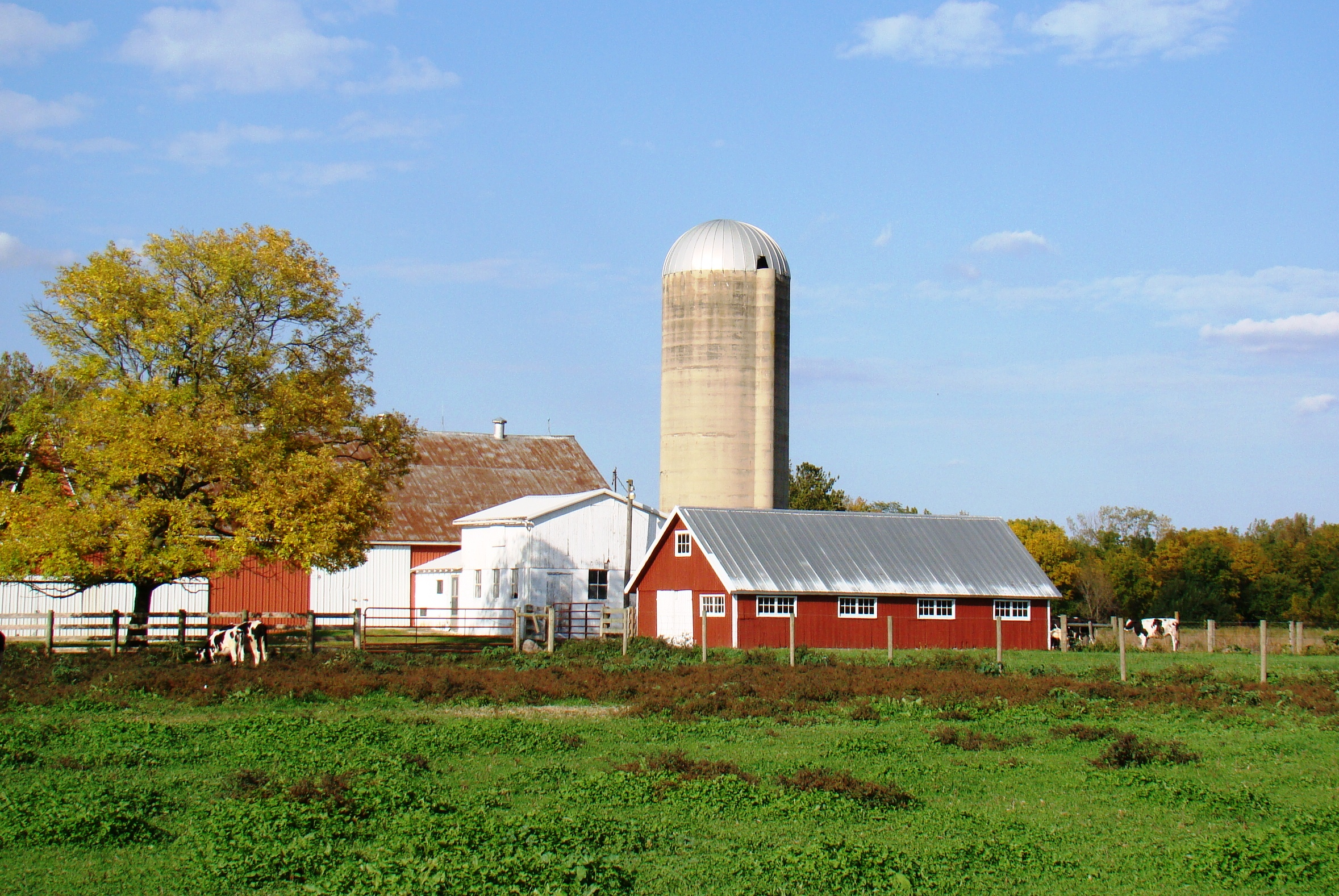
- King–Dennis Farm, September 2012

- Location within Indiana
- Location: 2939 King Rd., north of Centerville in Center Township, Wayne County, Indiana
- Coordinates: 39°52′10″N 84°58′34″W
- Area: 3.6 acres (1.5 ha)
- Built: c. 1840
- Architectural style: I-house
- NRHP reference No.: 00000677
- Added to NRHP: June 15, 2000

King–Dennis Farm is a historic home and farm located in Center Township, Wayne County, Indiana. The farmhouse was built about 1840, and is a large two-story, brick I-house. Also on the property are the contributing summer kitchen (c. 1910), poultry house (c. 1910), small barn (c. 1910), livestock barn (c. 1870), milk house (c. 1925), and an equipment barn.

It was added to the National Register of Historic Places in 2000.
