= Bethel, Wayne County, Indiana =

Bethel
- Unincorporated community
- Location within Indiana Location within the United States
- Coordinates: 39°59′12″N 84°49′49″W
- Country: United States
- State: Indiana
- County: Wayne
- Township: Franklin
- Elevation: 1,214 ft (370 m)
- Time zone: UTC-5 (Eastern (EST))
  - Summer (DST): UTC-4 (EDT)
- ZIP code: 47341
- Area code: 765
- GNIS feature ID: 430879

Bethel is an unincorporated community in Franklin Township, Wayne County, in the U.S. state of Indiana. Bethel is home of Indiana's highest natural point, Hoosier Hill.

== History ==
Bethel was laid out in 1850. A post office was established at Bethel in 1850, and remained in operation until it was discontinued in 1915.

== Geography ==
Hoosier Hill has an elevation of 1,257 feet (383 m) and is located on Elliot Rd. around the Bethel area. The visitation picnic area was created in 2005.

== In popular culture ==
=== Ghost Nation TV Series ===
"Phantom Fury" (Season 2, episode 14) was filmed at a residents home located on Bethel road in Bethel, Indiana. Ghost Nation is a paranormal investigation TV series created by former investigators from Ghost Hunters. The episode was filmed in August 2020 and aired on January 16, 2021.

=== John Dillinger ===
Famous American gangster from the 1930s, John Dillinger, has connections to Bethel, IN. Dillinger had created somewhat of a relationship with a woman named Mary Longnecker. She is the woman found on the picture that was in Dillingers watch after he was shot. While he was in prison, Longnecker had gotten involved with a Bethel resident named "Claude Constable". During this time, Dillinger's gang escaped him from prison and he either had swept through town, or had intentions to after hearing of the events.
