= Economy, Indiana =

- Town
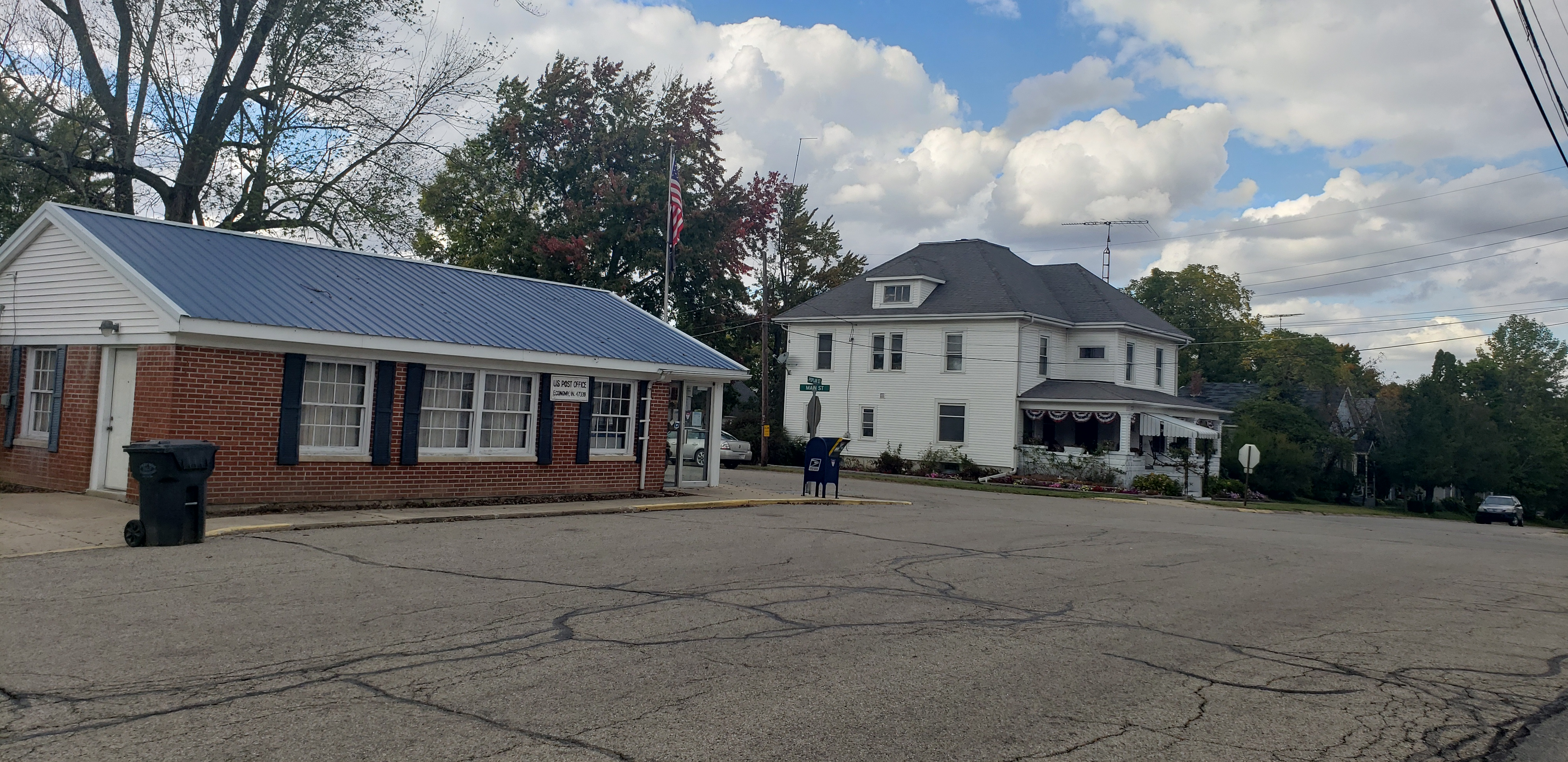

- Location of Economy in Wayne County, Indiana.
- Coordinates: 39°58′38″N 85°05′13″W
- Country: United States
- State: Indiana
- County: Wayne
- Township: Perry

Area
  - Total: 0.089 sq mi (0.23 km^{2})
  - Land: 0.089 sq mi (0.23 km^{2})
  - Water: 0 sq mi (0.00 km^{2})
- Elevation: 1,155 ft (352 m)

Population (2020)
  - Total: 145
  - Density: 1,616.6/sq mi (624.18/km^{2})
- Time zone: UTC-5 (Eastern (EST))
  - Summer (DST): UTC-5 (EST)
- ZIP code: 47339
- Area code: 765
- FIPS code: 18-20152
- GNIS feature ID: 2396919

Economy is a town in Perry Township, Wayne County, in the U.S. state of Indiana. The population was 145 at the 2020 census.

== History ==
Economy was laid out and platted in 1825. The town was named by the original landowner, Charles Osborn, who thought of laying out the town into lots as the most "economical" way of selling off his property, hence the name Economy.

The Economy post office has been in operation since 1827.

== Geography ==
According to the 2010 census, Economy has a total area of 0.1 square miles (0.26 km^{2}), all land.

== Demographics ==
Historical population
Census	Pop.	Note	%±
1880	249		—
1930	212		—
1940	251		18.4%
1950	285		13.5%
1960	280		−1.8%
1970	285		1.8%
1980	237		−16.8%
1990	151		−36.3%
2000	200		32.5%
2010	187		−6.5%
2020	145		−22.5%
U.S. Decennial Census

=== 2010 census ===
As of the census of 2010, there were 187 people, 73 households, and 47 families living in the town. The population density was 1,870.0 inhabitants per square mile (722.0/km^{2}). There were 89 housing units at an average density of 890.0 per square mile (343.6/km^{2}). The racial makeup of the town was 98.4% White and 1.6% from two or more races. Hispanic or Latino of any race were 2.1% of the population.

There were 73 households, of which 31.5% had children under the age of 18 living with them, 50.7% were married couples living together, 11.0% had a female householder with no husband present, 2.7% had a male householder with no wife present, and 35.6% were non-families. 28.8% of all households were made up of individuals, and 15.1% had someone living alone who was 65 years of age or older. The average household size was 2.56 and the average family size was 3.17.

The median age in the town was 38.6 years. 25.1% of residents were under the age of 18; 7.5% were between the ages of 18 and 24; 27.3% were from 25 to 44; 27.4% were from 45 to 64; and 12.8% were 65 years of age or older. The gender makeup of the town was 48.1% male and 51.9% female.

=== 2000 census ===
As of the census of 2000, there were 200 people, 74 households, and 56 families living in the town. The population density was 2,062.6 inhabitants per square mile (796.4/km^{2}). There were 79 housing units at an average density of 814.7 per square mile (314.6/km^{2}). The racial makeup of the town was 99.00% White, and 1.00% from two or more races. Hispanic or Latino of any race were 1.00% of the population.

There were 74 households, out of which 40.5% had children under the age of 18 living with them, 59.5% were married couples living together, 12.2% had a female householder with no husband present, and 24.3% were non-families. 20.3% of all households were made up of individuals, and 13.5% had someone living alone who was 65 years of age or older. The average household size was 2.70 and the average family size was 3.07.

In the town, the population was spread out, with 29.5% under the age of 18, 5.0% from 18 to 24, 27.5% from 25 to 44, 24.5% from 45 to 64, and 13.5% who were 65 years of age or older. The median age was 37 years. For every 100 females, there were 94.2 males. For every 100 females age 18 and over, there were 83.1 males.

The median income for a household in the town was $37,083, and the median income for a family was $42,917. Males had a median income of $36,042 versus $21,250 for females. The per capita income for the town was $17,609. About 13.1% of families and 16.0% of the population were below the poverty line, including 25.5% of those under the age of eighteen and 22.2% of those 65 or over.
