= Spring Grove, Indiana =

- Town
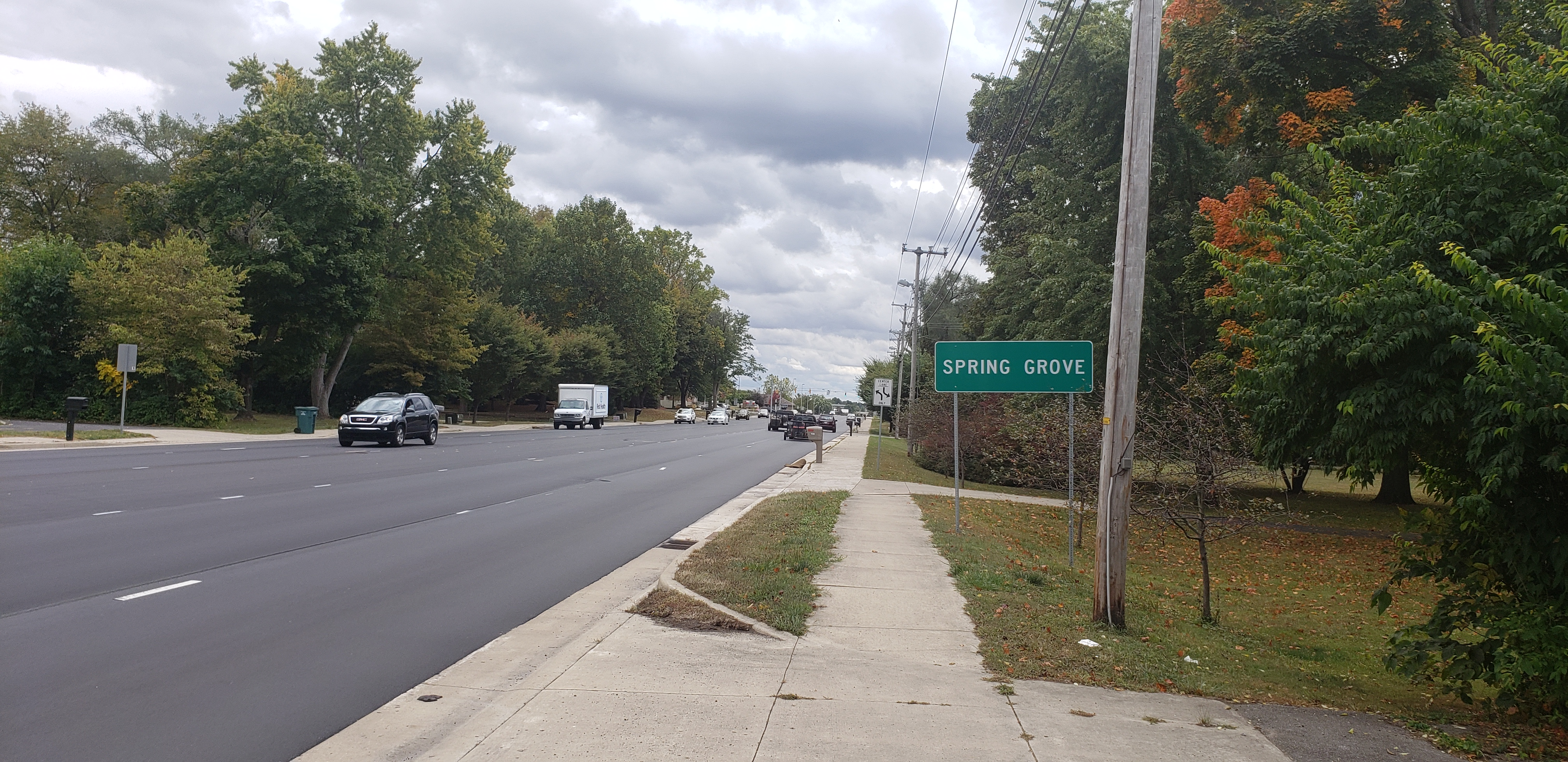

- Icon

- Location of Spring Grove in Wayne County, Indiana.
- Coordinates: 39°50′50″N 84°53′28″W
- Country: United States
- State: Indiana
- County: Wayne
- Township: Wayne

Area
  - Total: 0.31 sq mi (0.79 km^{2})
  - Land: 0.31 sq mi (0.79 km^{2})
  - Water: 0 sq mi (0.00 km^{2})
- Elevation: 991 ft (302 m)

Population (2020)
  - Total: 332
  - Density: 1,092.9/sq mi (421.97/km^{2})
- Time zone: UTC-5 (Eastern (EST))
  - Summer (DST): UTC-4 (EDT)
- ZIP code: 47374
- Area code: 765
- FIPS code: 18-72206
- GNIS feature ID: 2397673
- Website: springgroveindiana.com

Spring Grove is a town in Wayne Township, Wayne County, in the U.S. state of Indiana. The population was 332 at the 2020 census.

== Geography ==
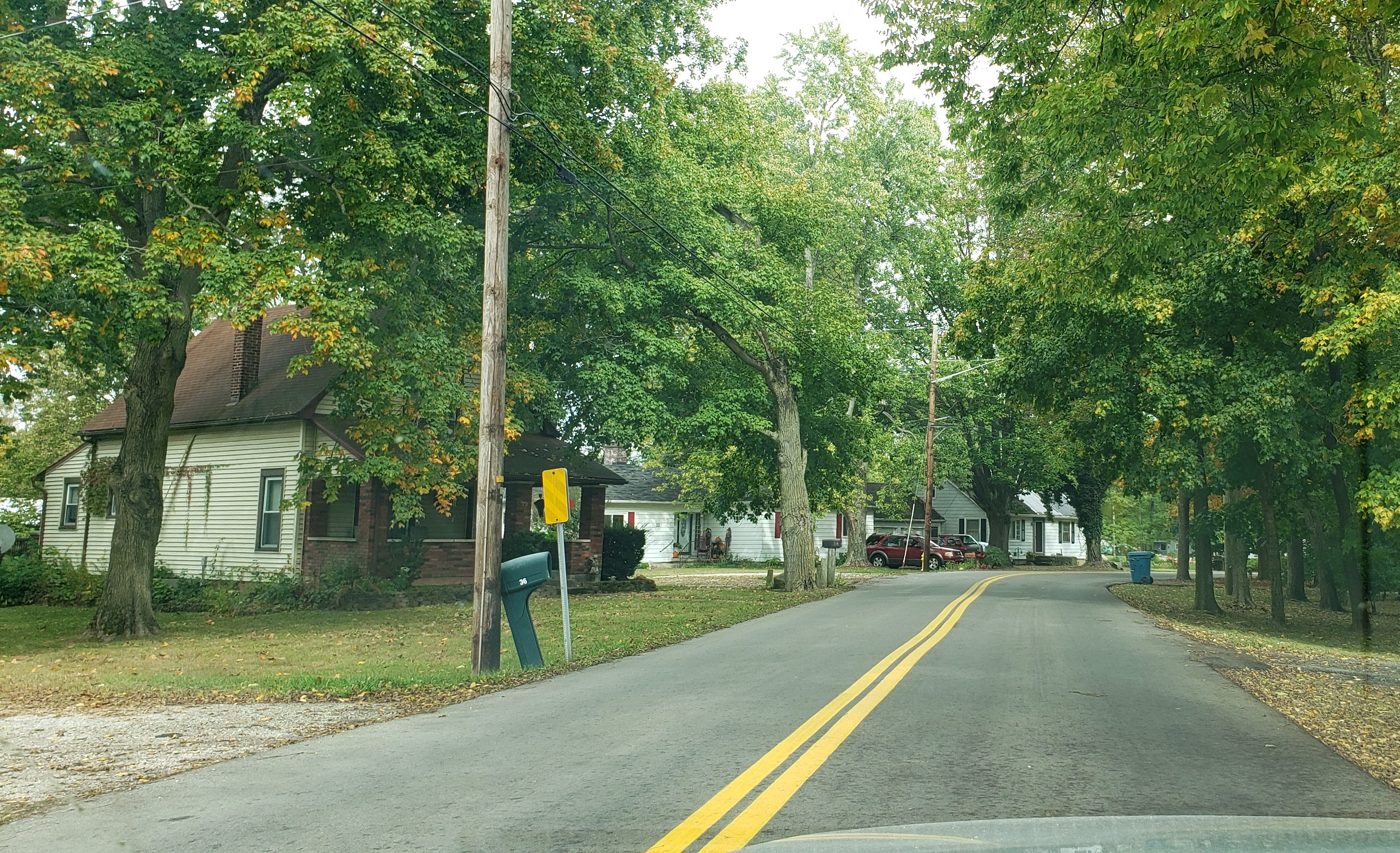
Spring Grove, Indiana

According to the 2010 census, Spring Grove has a total area of 0.321 square miles (0.83 km^{2}), of which 0.32 square miles (0.83 km^{2}) (or 99.69%) is land and 0.001 square miles (0.00 km^{2}) (or 0.31%) is water.

== Demographics ==
Historical population
Census	Pop.	Note	%±
1890	99		—
1900	113		14.1%
1910	122		8.0%
1920	76		−37.7%
1930	191		151.3%
1940	237		24.1%
1950	333		40.5%
1960	471		41.4%
1970	437		−7.2%
1980	469		7.3%
1990	420		−10.4%
2000	386		−8.1%
2010	344		−10.9%
2020	332		−3.5%
U.S. Decennial Census

=== 2010 census ===
As of the census of 2010, there were 344 people, 117 households, and 77 families living in the town. The population density was 1,075.0 inhabitants per square mile (415.1/km^{2}). There were 133 housing units at an average density of 415.6 per square mile (160.5/km^{2}). The racial makeup of the town was 89.2% White, 5.5% African American, 1.2% Asian, and 4.1% from two or more races. Hispanic or Latino of any race were 0.9% of the population.

There were 117 households, of which 24.8% had children under the age of 18 living with them, 51.3% were married couples living together, 12.0% had a female householder with no husband present, 2.6% had a male householder with no wife present, and 34.2% were non-families. 30.8% of all households were made up of individuals, and 10.3% had someone living alone who was 65 years of age or older. The average household size was 2.17 and the average family size was 2.70.

The median age in the town was 58.4 years. 15.4% of residents were under the age of 18; 3.8% were between the ages of 18 and 24; 15.5% were from 25 to 44; 24.7% were from 45 to 64; and 40.7% were 65 years of age or older. The gender makeup of the town was 42.4% male and 57.6% female.

=== 2000 census ===
As of the census of 2000, there were 386 people, 132 households, and 86 families living in the town. The population density was 1,216.8 inhabitants per square mile (469.8/km^{2}). There were 137 housing units at an average density of 431.9 per square mile (166.8/km^{2}). The racial makeup of the town was 94.82% White, 2.85% African American, 1.55% Asian, 0.26% from other races, and 0.52% from two or more races.

There were 132 households, out of which 18.9% had children under the age of 18 living with them, 55.3% were married couples living together, 8.3% had a female householder with no husband present, and 34.8% were non-families. 28.8% of all households were made up of individuals, and 14.4% had someone living alone who was 65 years of age or older. The average household size was 2.12 and the average family size was 2.55.

In the town, the population was spread out, with 11.9% under the age of 18, 3.1% from 18 to 24, 16.1% from 25 to 44, 29.8% from 45 to 64, and 39.1% who were 65 years of age or older. The median age was 57 years. For every 100 females, there were 70.0 males. For every 100 females age 18 and over, there were 67.5 males.

The median income for a household in the town was $45,781, and the median income for a family was $51,500. Males had a median income of $38,750 versus $21,250 for females. The per capita income for the town was $24,705. About 7.8% of families and 10.1% of the population were below the poverty line, including 31.4% of those under age 18 and none of those age 65 or over.
