= Whitewater, Indiana =

- Town
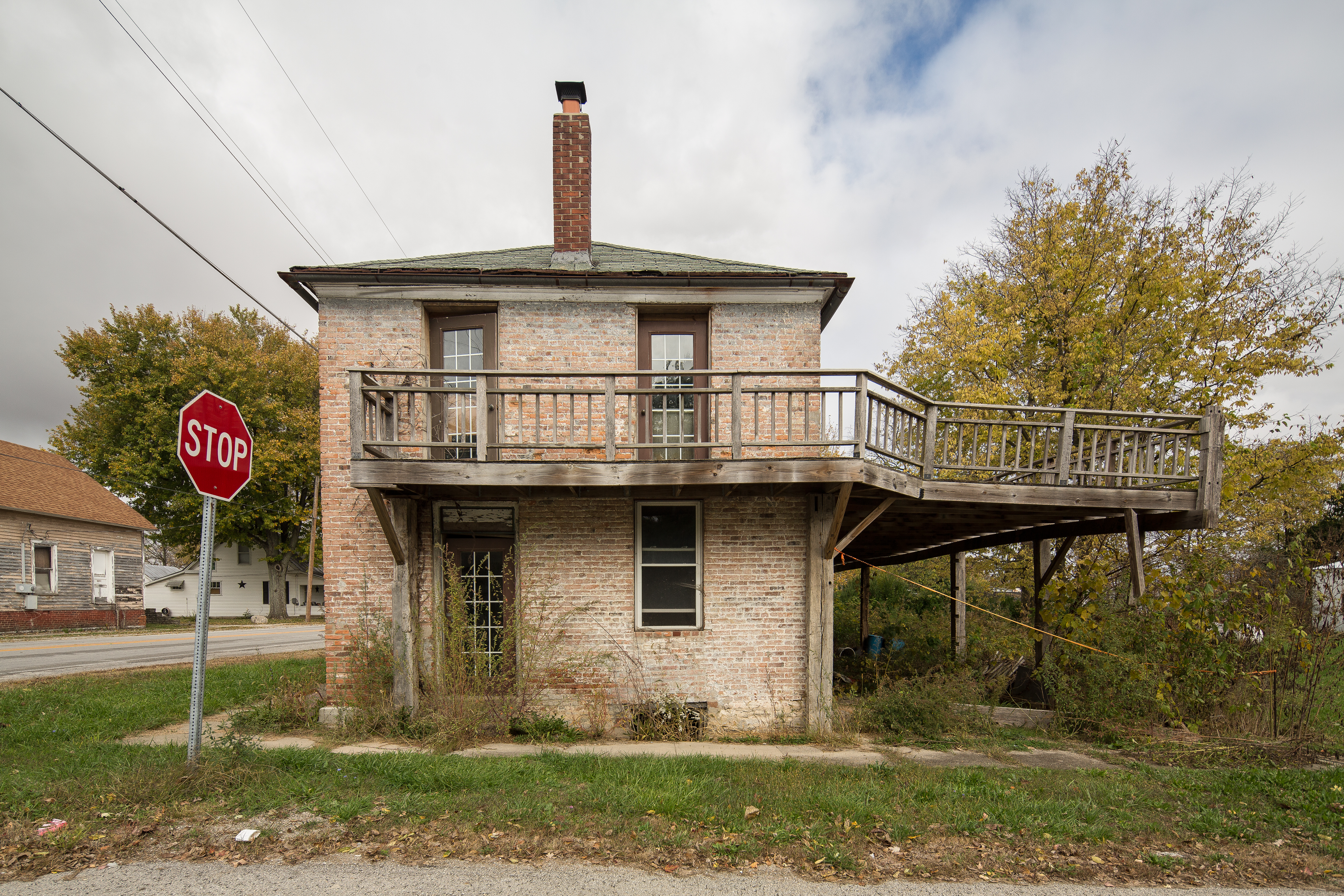

- Location of Whitewater in Wayne County, Indiana.
- Coordinates: 39°56′41″N 84°49′52″W
- Country: United States
- State: Indiana
- County: Wayne
- Township: Franklin

Area
  - Total: 0.077 sq mi (0.20 km^{2})
  - Land: 0.077 sq mi (0.20 km^{2})
  - Water: 0 sq mi (0.00 km^{2})
- Elevation: 1,132 ft (345 m)

Population (2020)
  - Total: 71
  - Density: 902.6/sq mi (348.49/km^{2})
- Time zone: UTC-5 (Eastern (EST))
  - Summer (DST): UTC-4 (EDT)
- ZIP code: 47374
- Area code: 765
- FIPS code: 18-84086
- GNIS feature ID: 2397742

Whitewater is a town in Franklin Township, Wayne County, in the U.S. state of Indiana. As of the 2020 census, Whitewater had a population of 71.

== History ==
Whitewater was originally called Hillsborough, and under the latter name was laid out and platted in 1828. The community was named after the nearby Whitewater River.

The first post office in Whitewater was established in 1832.

== Geography ==
According to the 2010 census, Whitewater has a total area of 0.08 square miles (0.21 km^{2}), all land.

== Demographics ==
Historical population
Census	Pop.	Note	%±
1880	181		—
1890	123		−32.0%
1900	155		26.0%
1910	112		−27.7%
1920	96		−14.3%
1930	121		26.0%
1940	114		−5.8%
1950	104		−8.8%
1960	102		−1.9%
1970	111		8.8%
1980	107		−3.6%
1990	111		3.7%
2000	78		−29.7%
2010	83		6.4%
2020	71		−14.5%
U.S. Decennial Census

=== 2010 census ===
As of the census of 2010, there were 83 people, 35 households, and 27 families living in the town. The population density was 1,037.5 inhabitants per square mile (400.6/km^{2}). There were 36 housing units at an average density of 450.0 per square mile (173.7/km^{2}). The racial makeup of the town was 100.0% White.

There were 35 households, of which 28.6% had children under the age of 18 living with them, 54.3% were married couples living together, 11.4% had a female householder with no husband present, 11.4% had a male householder with no wife present, and 22.9% were non-families. 14.3% of all households were made up of individuals, and 5.7% had someone living alone who was 65 years of age or older. The average household size was 2.37 and the average family size was 2.63.

The median age in the town was 38.5 years. 25.3% of residents were under the age of 18; 3.5% were between the ages of 18 and 24; 25.2% were from 25 to 44; 26.4% were from 45 to 64; and 19.3% were 65 years of age or older. The gender makeup of the town was 55.4% male and 44.6% female.

=== 2000 census ===
As of the census of 2000, there were 78 people, 28 households, and 25 families living in the town. The population density was 976.0 inhabitants per square mile (376.8/km^{2}). There were 32 housing units at an average density of 400.4 per square mile (154.6/km^{2}). The racial makeup of the town was 100.00% White.

There were 28 households, out of which 32.1% had children under the age of 18 living with them, 75.0% were married couples living together, 7.1% had a female householder with no husband present, and 10.7% were non-families. 7.1% of all households were made up of individuals, and 7.1% had someone living alone who was 65 years of age or older. The average household size was 2.79, and the average family size was 2.84.

In the town, the population was spread out, with 28.2% under the age of 18, 5.1% from 18 to 24, 25.6% from 25 to 44, 23.1% from 45 to 64, and 17.9% who were 65 years of age or older. The median age was 40 years. For every 100 females, there were 122.9 males. For every 100 females age 18 and over, there were 100.0 males.

The median income for a household in the town was $31,875, and the median income for a family was $33,125. Males had a median income of $43,250 versus $26,250 for females. The per capita income for the town was $13,987. There were 9.5% of families and 6.7% of the population living below the poverty line, including no under eighteens and none of those over 64.
