= Chester, Indiana =

- Unincorporated community
- Location within Indiana Location within the United States
- Coordinates: 39°53′18″N 84°53′17″W
- Country: United States
- State: Indiana
- County: Wayne
- Township: Wayne
- Elevation: 1,047 ft (319 m)
- Time zone: UTC-5 (Eastern (EST))
  - Summer (DST): UTC-4 (EDT)
- ZIP code: 47374
- Area code: 765
- GNIS feature ID: 432449

Chester is an unincorporated community in Wayne Township, Wayne County, in the U.S. state of Indiana.

== History ==
A post office was established at Chester in 1848, and remained in operation until it was discontinued in 1901.
