= Hillcrest Country Club (Indianapolis, Indiana) =

- U.S. National Register of Historic Places
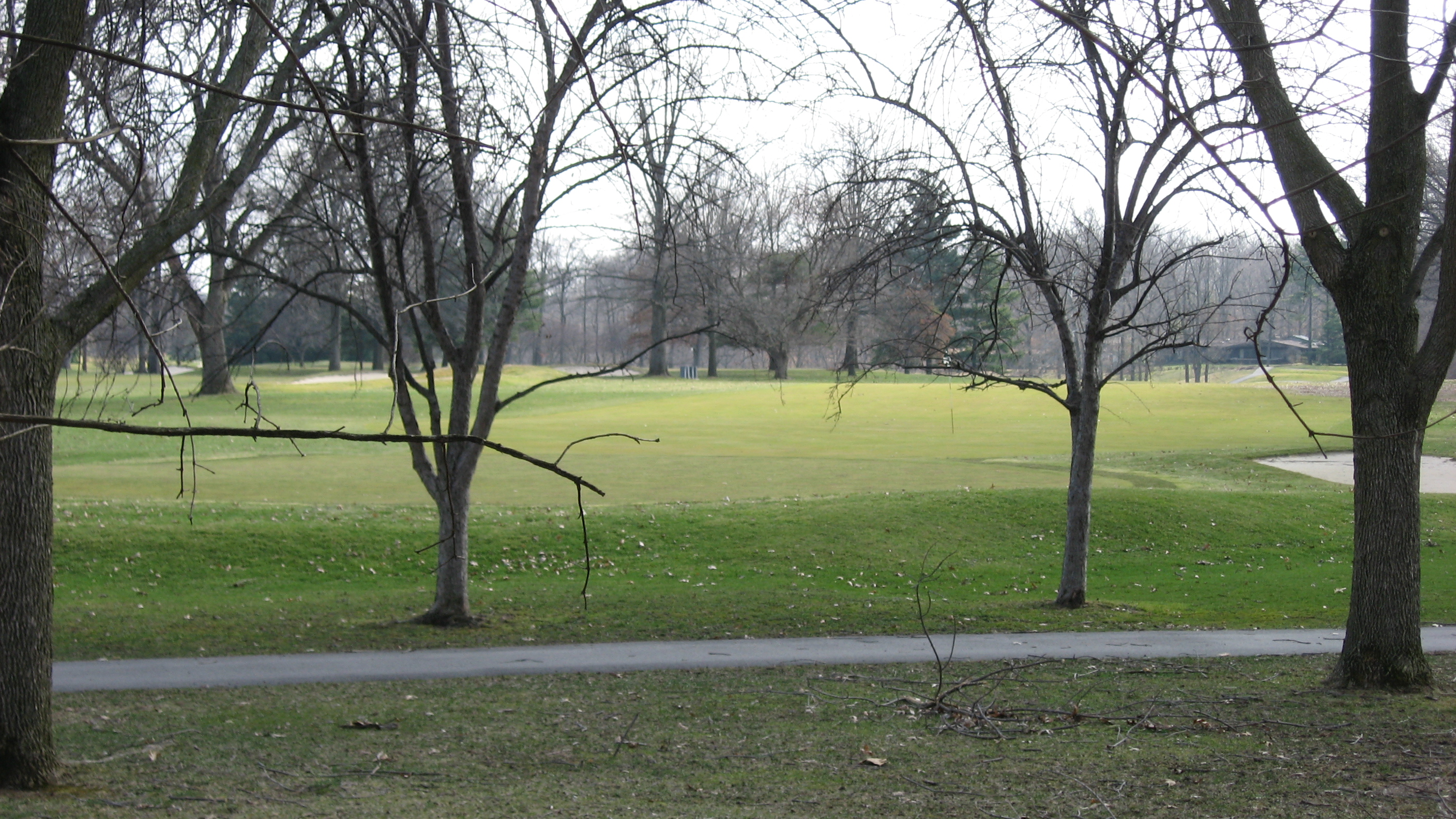
- Hillcrest Country Club, March 2011

- Location within Indianapolis Location within Indiana Location within the United States
- Location: 6098 Fall Creek Rd., Indianapolis, Indiana
- Coordinates: 39°52′25″N 86°03′40″W
- Area: 112 acres (45 ha)
- Built: 1930
- Architect: Diddel, William H.; Cannon, Fermor S. et al
- Architectural style: Mission/spanish Revival
- NRHP reference No.: 04001099
- Added to NRHP: September 29, 2004

Hillcrest Country Club, also known as Avalon Country Club, is a historic country club located in suburban Lawrence Township, Marion County, Indiana, northeast of Indianapolis, Indiana. The 18 hole golf course was designed by Bill Diddel and was built in 1924. The clubhouse was built in 1929–1930, and renovated in 2000. It is a three-story, Mission Revival style with tall arched openings, and a low tile roof with bracketed eaves. Also on the property are the contributing swimming pool (1934), well house (c. 1940), and water pump (c. 1935).

It was added to the National Register of Historic Places in 2004.

== See also ==
- National Register of Historic Places listings in Marion County, Indiana
