= Clay Township, Wayne County, Indiana =

Clay Township
- Township
- Location in Wayne County
- Coordinates: 39°53′29″N 85°02′39″W
- Country: United States
- State: Indiana
- County: Wayne

Government
  - Type: Indiana township

Area
  - Total: 19.91 sq mi (51.6 km^{2})
  - Land: 19.84 sq mi (51.4 km^{2})
  - Water: 0.06 sq mi (0.16 km^{2}) 0.30%
- Elevation: 1,020 ft (311 m)

Population (2020)
  - Total: 1,121
  - Density: 58.9/sq mi (22.7/km^{2})
- Time zone: UTC-5 (Eastern (EST))
  - Summer (DST): UTC-4 (EDT)
- Area code: 765
- GNIS feature ID: 453220

Clay Township is one of fifteen townships in Wayne County, Indiana, United States. As of the 2010 census, its population was 1,169 and it contained 445 housing units.

== History ==
Clay Township was organized in 1832.

== Geography ==
According to the 2010 census, the township has a total area of 19.91 square miles (51.6 km^{2}), of which 19.84 square miles (51.4 km^{2}) (or 99.65%) is land and 0.06 square miles (0.16 km^{2}) (or 0.30%) is water. The streams of Our Run and Pale Run pass through this township.

=== Cities and towns ===
- Greens Fork

=== Unincorporated towns ===
(This list is based on USGS data and may include former settlements.)

=== Adjacent townships ===
- Green Township (northeast)
- Center Township (southeast)
- Harrison Township (southwest)
- Jefferson Township (west)
- Perry Township (northwest)

=== Cemeteries ===
The township contains two cemeteries: Fairfield and Greens Fork.

=== Major highways ===
- Indiana State Road 38
