= Franklin Township, Wayne County, Indiana =

Franklin Township
- Township
- Location in Wayne County
- Coordinates: 39°57′20″N 84°50′35″W
- Country: United States
- State: Indiana
- County: Wayne

Government
  - Type: Indiana township

Area
  - Total: 28.4 sq mi (74 km^{2})
  - Land: 28.36 sq mi (73.5 km^{2})
  - Water: 0.05 sq mi (0.13 km^{2}) 0.18%
- Elevation: 1,155 ft (352 m)

Population (2020)
  - Total: 1,319
  - Density: 48.3/sq mi (18.6/km^{2})
- Time zone: UTC-5 (Eastern (EST))
  - Summer (DST): UTC-4 (EDT)
- Area code: 765
- GNIS feature ID: 453316

Franklin Township is one of fifteen townships in Wayne County, Indiana, United States. As of the 2010 census, its population was 1,370 and it contained 534 housing units.

== History ==
Franklin Township was organized in 1834.

== Geography ==
According to the 2010 census, the township has a total area of 28.4 square miles (74 km^{2}), of which 28.36 square miles (73.5 km^{2}) (or 99.86%) is land and 0.05 square miles (0.13 km^{2}) (or 0.18%) is water. The streams of Bethel Creek, Black Brook, Clay Run, Land Drain, Middle Brook, Small Run, Vernon Brook and White Creek run through this township.

The highest natural point in Indiana, Hoosier Hill, is located in this township.

=== Cities and towns ===
- Whitewater

=== Unincorporated towns ===
- Bethel at 39.9867145°N 84.8302381°W

(This list is based on USGS data and may include former settlements.)

=== Cemeteries ===
The township contains the following cemeteries: Bethel, Mount Vernon, Whitewater and Woodbury.

=== Major highways ===
- Indiana State Road 227
