= Woodstock Country Club =

- U.S. National Register of Historic Places
- U.S. Historic district
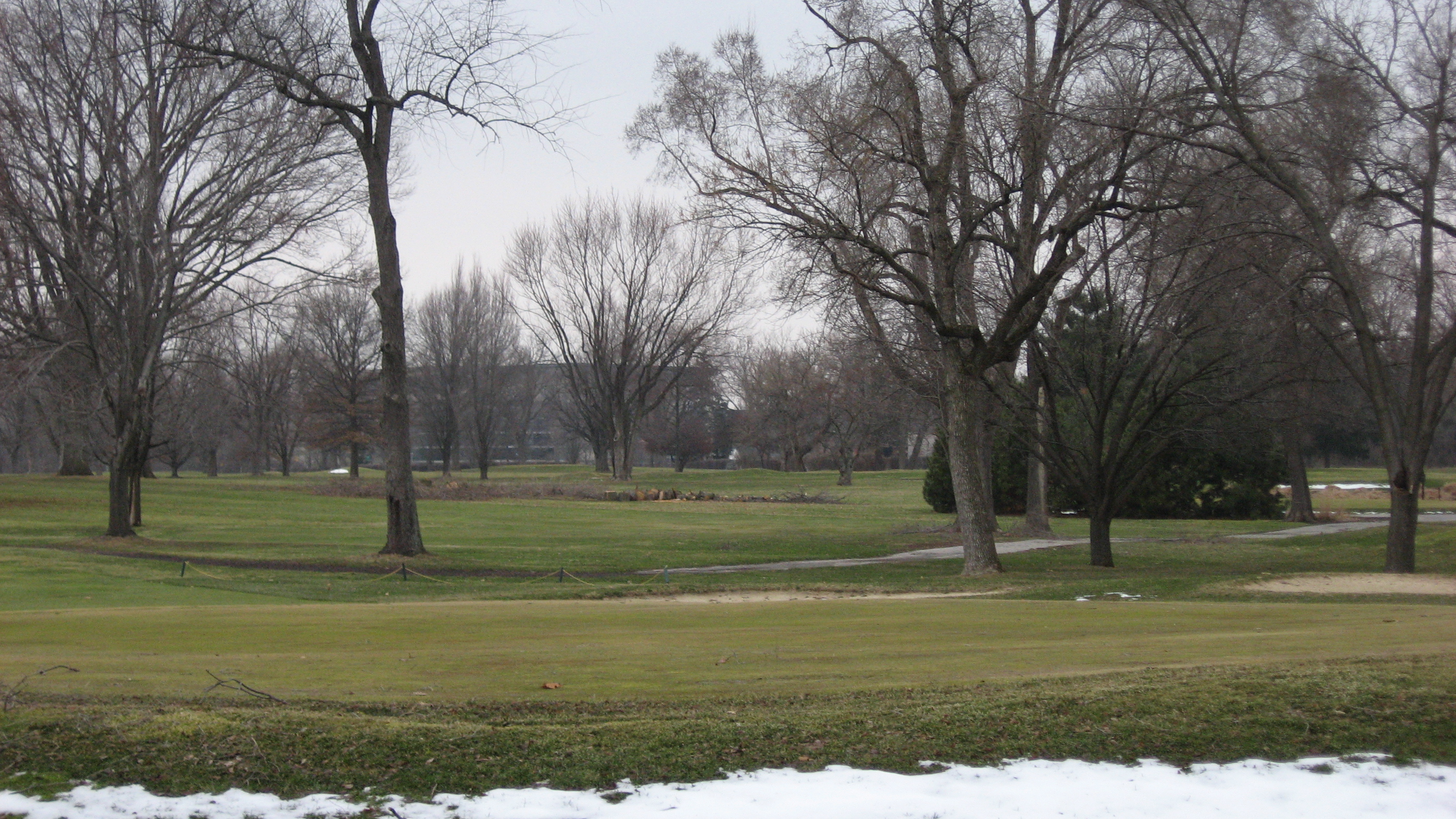
- Woodstock Country Club green, February 2011

- Location within Indianapolis Location within Indiana Location within the United States
- Location: 1301 W. 38th St., Indianapolis, Indiana
- Coordinates: 39°49′22″N 86°11′13″W
- Area: 54 acres (22 ha)
- Architect: Wallick, Frederick; Diddel, William H.
- Architectural style: Colonial Revival
- NRHP reference No.: 07000561
- Added to NRHP: June 21, 2007

Woodstock Country Club is a historic country club and national historic district located at Indianapolis, Indiana. It was developed between 1923 and 1956 and includes the 1923 Colonial Revival clubhouse expanded in 1957 and 1988. It consists of a central block with flanking wings and a three-arch porte cochere. Also on the property are the contributing main swimming pool (1927, 1996) and upper and lower tennis courts (c. 1900, c. 1922). The golf course was originally designed in 1899 and reconstructed in 1927–1928 by Bill Diddel.

It was listed on the National Register of Historic Places in 2007.

== See also ==
- National Register of Historic Places listings in Center Township, Marion County, Indiana
