= Perry Township, Wayne County, Indiana =

Perry Township
- Township
- Location in Wayne County
- Coordinates: 39°58′30″N 85°05′14″W
- Country: United States
- State: Indiana
- County: Wayne

Government
  - Type: Indiana township

Area
  - Total: 17.44 sq mi (45.2 km^{2})
  - Land: 17.43 sq mi (45.1 km^{2})
  - Water: 0.01 sq mi (0.026 km^{2}) 0.06%
- Elevation: 1,145 ft (349 m)

Population (2020)
  - Total: 820
  - Density: 47.9/sq mi (18.5/km^{2})
- Time zone: UTC-5 (Eastern (EST))
  - Summer (DST): UTC-4 (EDT)
- Area code: 765
- GNIS feature ID: 453727
- Website: www.in.gov/townships/perry89/

Perry Township is one of fifteen townships in Wayne County, Indiana, United States. As of the 2010 census, its population was 835 and it contained 325 housing units.

== History ==
Perry Township was originally settled chiefly by Quakers.

== Geography ==
According to the 2010 census, the township has a total area of 17.44 square miles (45.2 km^{2}), of which 17.43 square miles (45.1 km^{2}) (or 99.94%) is land and 0.01 square miles (0.026 km^{2}) (or 0.06%) is water. Lakes in this township include Osborne Lakes. The streams of Economy Run, Jordon Creek, Mop Run, Swab Creek, Wash Branch and West Brook run through this township.

=== Cities and towns ===
- Economy

=== Adjacent townships ===
- Union Township, Randolph County (north)
- Green Township (east)
- Clay Township (southeast)
- Jefferson Township (southwest)
- Dalton Township (west)

=== Cemeteries ===
The township contains two cemeteries: Economy and Jordon.

=== Major highways ===
- U.S. Route 35
