= Samuel G. Smith Farm =

- U.S. National Register of Historic Places
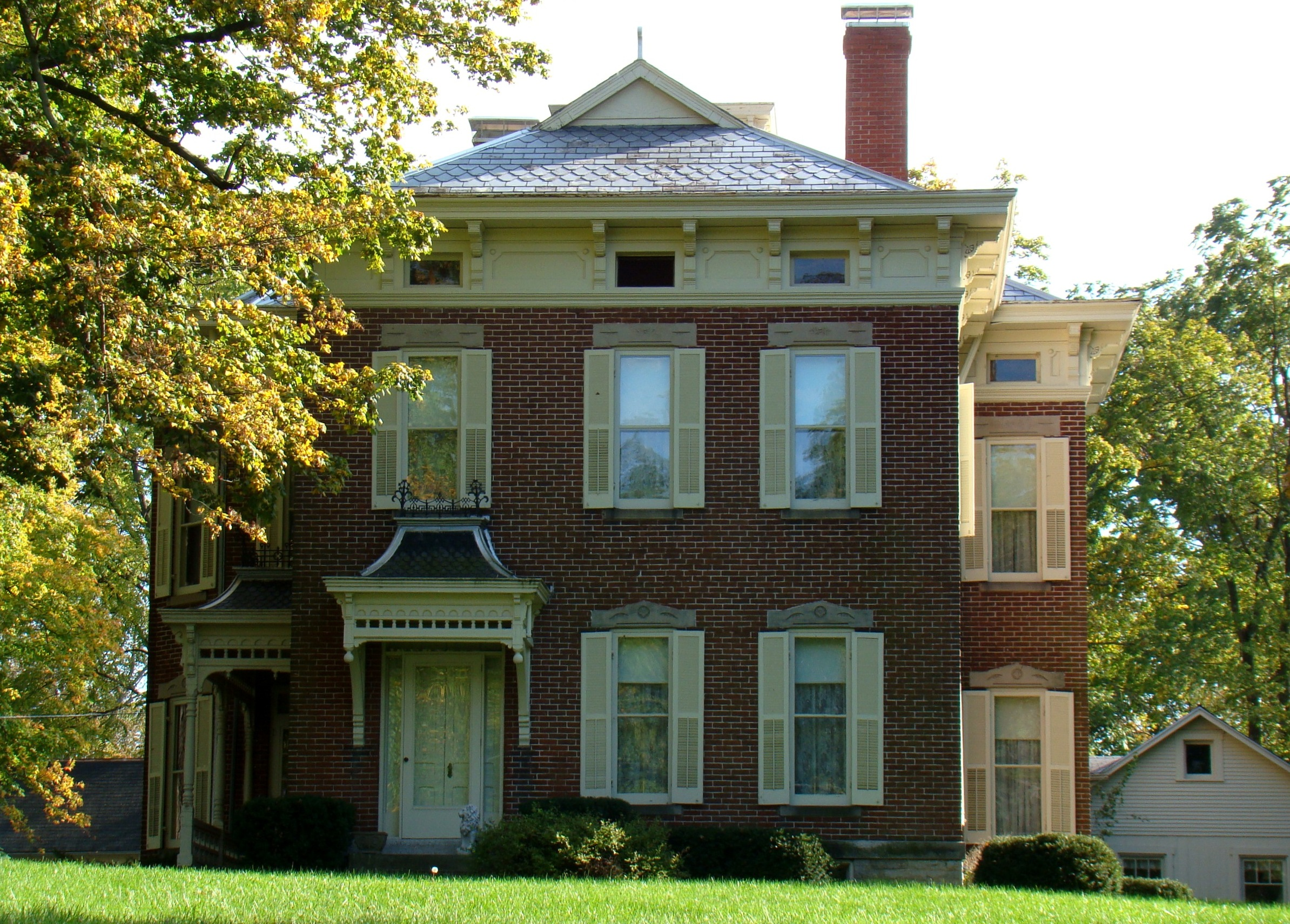
- Samuel G. Smith Farm, September 2012

- Location within Indiana Location within the United States
- Location: West of Richmond at 3431 Crowe Rd., Center Township, Wayne County, Indiana
- Coordinates: 39°50′23″N 84°56′51″W
- Area: 6 acres (2.4 ha)
- Built: 1888
- Built by: Powel & Co., Edward; Bryant, Edward B.
- Architectural style: Italianate, Queen Anne
- NRHP reference No.: 83000044
- Added to NRHP: January 14, 1983

Samuel G. Smith Farm is a historic home and farm located in Center Township, Wayne County, Indiana. The farmhouse was built in 1888, and is a two-story, Italianate style brick dwelling with Queen Anne style design elements. Also on the property are the contributing log house (c. 1820), carriage house, barn, corn crib, chicken house, and ice house.

It was added to the National Register of Historic Places in 1983.
