= Bill Diddel =

William H. Diddel (1884 – February 25, 1985) was an American amateur golfer and golf course designer. He was born in Indianapolis, Indiana.

Diddel designed approximately three hundred golf courses, primarily in the midwest United States, beginning with Ulen Country Club in Lebanon, Indiana. Diddel designed the golf course at Northwood Club in Dallas, Texas, which was the site of the 1952 U.S. Open.

Diddel was one of the founders and a charter member of the American Society of Golf Course Architects. He was elected president of that body in 1954.

Diddel was the recipient of numerous awards and recognitions, including:

- The Fred Waring Sportsmanship Award
- The American Seniors Golf Association Hall of Honor
- Indiana Golf Hall of Fame
- Sagamore of The Wabash
- Honorary Sergeant of Arms of the Tennessee State Senate

Diddel died in Zionsville, Indiana.

== Courses designed ==
Arkansas:

- Hot Springs G&CC (Arlington Cse 1932).

Florida:

- Bardmoor CC (East Cse 1968, NLE; North Cse 1974; South Cse 1974)
- CC of Naples (1963)
- Jupiter Island C (1958)
- Melbourne G&CC (1926)
- Sunset G&CC (1926)
- Sunset Hills CC (1926)

Illinois:

- Danville CC (9 1928)
- Edgewood Valley CC (1926)
- Midland Hills GC (9 1929)
- Rolling Green CC (1930)
- Sunset Ridge CC (1924)

Indiana:

- Anderson CC (9 1934)
- Beechwood GC (1930)
- Beeson Park GC (9 1932)
- Brookshire GC (1971)
- Coffin Muni (1931)
- Columbus CC (9 1946)
- Connersville CC (9)
- Crawfordsville Muni (1931)
- CC of Indianapolis (1923)
- Elcona CC (1955)
- Elks CC (now West Lafayette Golf and CC), West Lafayette (1928)
- Elks CC, Marion (1961)
- Erskine Muni (1934)
- Evansville CC
- Fendrich GC (1945)
- Forest Hills CC (1931)
- Forest Park GC (9 1935)
- Fort Harrison GC (1970)
- Fox Cliff CC (1970)
- Green Hills G&CC (1951)
- Greentree (1959)
- Hamilton Muni (1951)
- Hartley Hills CC (1928)
- Hawthorne Hills CC (27 1963)
- Hendricks County GC (1927)
- Highland G&CC (1921)
- Hillcrest CC (1924)
- Honeywell GC (9)
- Kilbuck GC (1965)
- Marion CC (9 1927)
- Martinsville CC (1925)
- Meridian Hills CC (1923)
- Mineral Springs GC (1953)
- Minnestrista GC (9 1930)
- Oak Grove CC (9 1941)
- Oak Hill GC (1962)
- Oak Lawn GC (1962)
- Parke County GC (9 1959)
- Purdue University GC (South Cse 1934)
- Riverside Muni (1935)
- Rockville GC (9 1959)
- Rolling Hills CC
- Rozella Ford GC
- Rushville Elks CC (9 1950)
- Shady Hills GC (1957)
- Shelbyville Elks CC (9 1930)
- Speedway 500 CC (1928 A.3rd 9 1956)
- Sun Blest GC (1940)
- Tipton Muni (9 1963, A9 1967)
- Twin Lakes GC (FKA Elks, Green Tree CC)
- Ulen CC (1924)
- Valley View GC (1962)
- Walnut Grove GC (1969)
- Winchester GC Beeson/Willow
- Woodland GC (1951)
- Woodstock GC (1927–1928)

Kansas:

- Wichita CC (1950)

Kentucky:

- Frankfort CC (1949)
- Highland CC (9 1954)
- Wildwood CC (1952)

Michigan:

- Echo Lake CC (1927)
- Forest Lake CC (1926)
- Hidden Valley CC (1957)
- Lake St. Clair CC (1929)
- Shanty Creek GC (Deskin Cse 1968)

Missouri:

- Crystal Lake CC (1929)

Montana:

- Lewistown Elks CC (9 1948)
- Meadow Lark CC (1949)

Ohio

- California GC (1936)
- Fairborn CC (1961)
- Greene CC
- Indian Valley GC
- Kenwood CC (Kendale Cse 1930 Kenview Cse 1930)
- Miami View GC (1961)
- Neumann Park GC (1965)
- Potter Park GC (1958)
- Reeves Memorial GC (9 1965)
- Sharon Woods GC (1935)
- Stillmeadow CC (formerly known as Royal Oaks) (1963)
- Swaim Fields GC ( 9 1933 A. 9 1955)
- Twin Base GC Wright- Patterson AFB (1953)
- Twin Run GC (1965)
- Walnut Grove CC (1937)
- Western Row GC (1965)
- Winton Woods GC

Oklahoma

- Mohawk Park Muni (Woodbine Cse 1934)

Texas:

- Northwood CC (1948)

Wisconsin:

- Brynwood CC (1954)
- Lake-side CC (1956)
