= Junior Saffer =

American basketball player

Personal information
- Born: July 27, 1918 Greens Fork, Indiana, U.S.
- Died: July 6, 1982 (aged 63) Richmond, Indiana, U.S.
- Listed height: 6 ft 0 in (1.83 m)
- Listed weight: 165 lb (75 kg)

Career information
- High school: Greens Fork (Greens Fork, Indiana)
- Position: Forward

Career history
- 1937: Cincinnati Comellos

Edgar "Junior" Saffer Jr. (July 27, 1918 – July 6, 1982) was an American professional basketball player. He played in just one game for the Cincinnati Comellos in the National Basketball League during the 1937–38 season.
