= Forest Hills Country Club =

- U.S. National Register of Historic Places
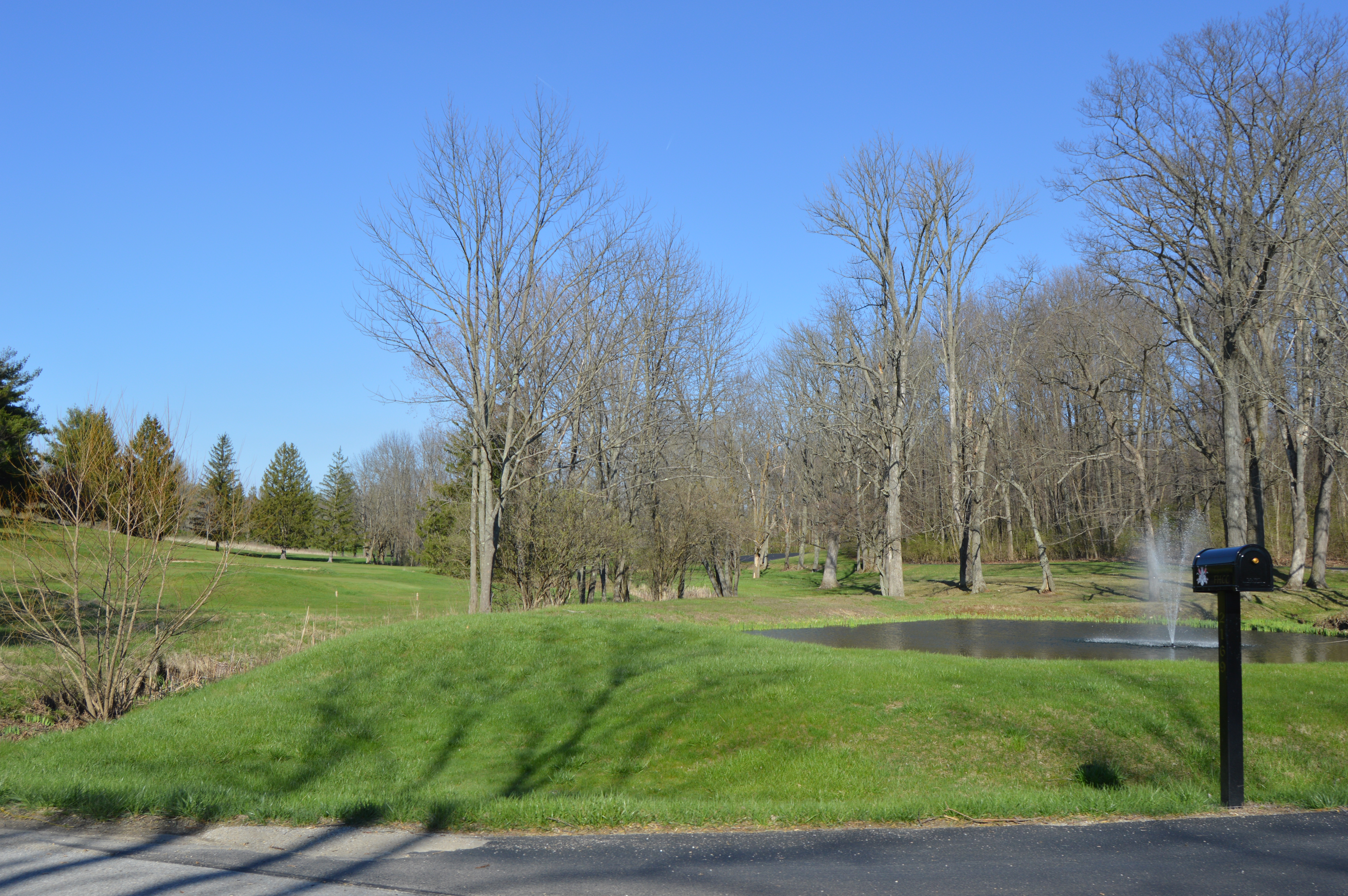
- Forest Hills Country Club, April 2016

- Location within Indiana Location within the United States
- Location: 2169 S. 23rd St., Wayne Township, Wayne County, Indiana
- Coordinates: 39°48′15″N 84°52′11″W
- Area: 161 acres (65 ha)
- Built: 1927, 1931
- Architect: Schenck (Harry) and Williams (Harry); Diddel, William H. (Bill)
- Architectural style: Tudor Revival
- NRHP reference No.: 15000892
- Added to NRHP: December 15, 2015

Forest Hills Country Club is a historic country club located in Wayne Township, Wayne County, Indiana. The clubhouse was built in 1927, and is a two-story, stuccoed, Tudor Revival style building. It has a cross-gable roof with half-timbering on the gable ends. William H. (Bill) Diddel designed a nine-hole golf course for the Forest Hills Country Club in 1927. In 1931, the club brought Diddel back to add another nine holes. Also on the property are the contributing swimming pool, two maintenance buildings, and two shelters.

It was added to the National Register of Historic Places in 2015.
