= Harrison Township, Wayne County, Indiana =

Harrison Township
- Township
- Location in Wayne County
- Coordinates: 39°51′11″N 85°06′08″W
- Country: United States
- State: Indiana
- County: Wayne

Government
  - Type: Indiana township

Area
  - Total: 16.51 sq mi (42.8 km^{2})
  - Land: 16.36 sq mi (42.4 km^{2})
  - Water: 0.16 sq mi (0.41 km^{2}) 0.97%
- Elevation: 981 ft (299 m)

Population (2020)
  - Total: 382
  - Density: 24/sq mi (9.3/km^{2})
- Time zone: UTC-5 (Eastern (EST))
  - Summer (DST): UTC-4 (EDT)
- Area code: 765
- GNIS feature ID: 453399

Harrison Township is one of fifteen townships in Wayne County, Indiana, United States. As of the 2010 census, its population was 392 and it contained 138 housing units.

== History ==
Harrison Township was organized in 1843.

== Geography ==
According to the 2010 census, the township has a total area of 16.51 square miles (42.8 km^{2}), of which 16.36 square miles (42.4 km^{2}) (or 99.09%) is land and 0.16 square miles (0.41 km^{2}) (or 0.97%) is water. The streams of Beard Run, Black Water Branch, College Corner Branch, Mud Run, Oser Creek, Silver Creek, Silver Station Brook and Square Run run through this township.

=== Unincorporated towns ===
- College Corner at 39.8383799°N 85.0705194°W
- Jacksonburg at 39.8531022°N 85.1057975°W

(This list is based on USGS data and may include former settlements.)

=== Adjacent townships ===
- Clay Township (northeast)
- Center Township (east)
- Jackson Township (west)
- Jefferson Township (northwest)

=== Cemeteries ===
The township contains two cemeteries, Jacksonburg and Beard.

=== Major highways ===
- Interstate 70
- Indiana State Road 1
