= Abington Township, Wayne County, Indiana =

Abington Township
- Township
- Location in Wayne County
- Coordinates: 39°45′15″N 84°59′27″W
- Country: United States
- State: Indiana
- County: Wayne

Government
  - Type: Indiana township

Area
  - Total: 21.17 sq mi (54.8 km^{2})
  - Land: 21.07 sq mi (54.6 km^{2})
  - Water: 0.1 sq mi (0.26 km^{2}) 0.47%
- Elevation: 1,070 ft (326 m)

Population (2020)
  - Total: 786
  - Density: 40.5/sq mi (15.6/km^{2})
- Time zone: UTC-5 (Eastern (EST))
  - Summer (DST): UTC-4 (EDT)
- Area code: 765
- GNIS feature ID: 453071

Abington Township is one of fifteen townships in Wayne County, Indiana, United States. As of the 2010 census, its population was 853 and it contained 366 housing units.

== History ==
Abington Township was formed in 1837.

== Geography ==
According to the 2010 census, the township has a total area of 21.17 square miles (54.8 km^{2}), of which 21.07 square miles (54.6 km^{2}) (or 99.53%) is land and 0.1 square miles (0.26 km^{2}) (or 0.47%) is water. Lakes in this township include Elkhorn Lakes. The streams of Elkhorn Creek, Locust Creek and Smith Creek run through this township.

=== Unincorporated towns ===
- Abington at 39.7331033°N 84.9630172°W

(This list is based on USGS data and may include former settlements.)

=== Adjacent townships ===
- Center Township (north)
- Boston Township (east)
- Harrison Township, Union County (southeast)
- Brownsville Township, Union County (south)
- Waterloo Township, Fayette County (southwest)
- Washington Township (west)

=== Cemeteries ===
The township contains one cemetery, Locust Grove.

=== Major highways ===
- U.S. Route 27

=== Airports and landing strips ===
- Squires Airport
