= Dalton, Indiana =

- Unincorporated community
- Location within Indiana Location within the United States
- Coordinates: 39°59′00″N 85°10′53″W
- Country: United States
- State: Indiana
- County: Wayne
- Township: Dalton
- Elevation: 1,066 ft (325 m)
- Time zone: UTC-5 (Eastern (EST))
  - Summer (DST): UTC-4 (EDT)
- ZIP code: 47346
- Area code: 765
- GNIS feature ID: 447636

Dalton is an unincorporated community in Dalton Township, Wayne County, in the U.S. state of Indiana.

== History ==
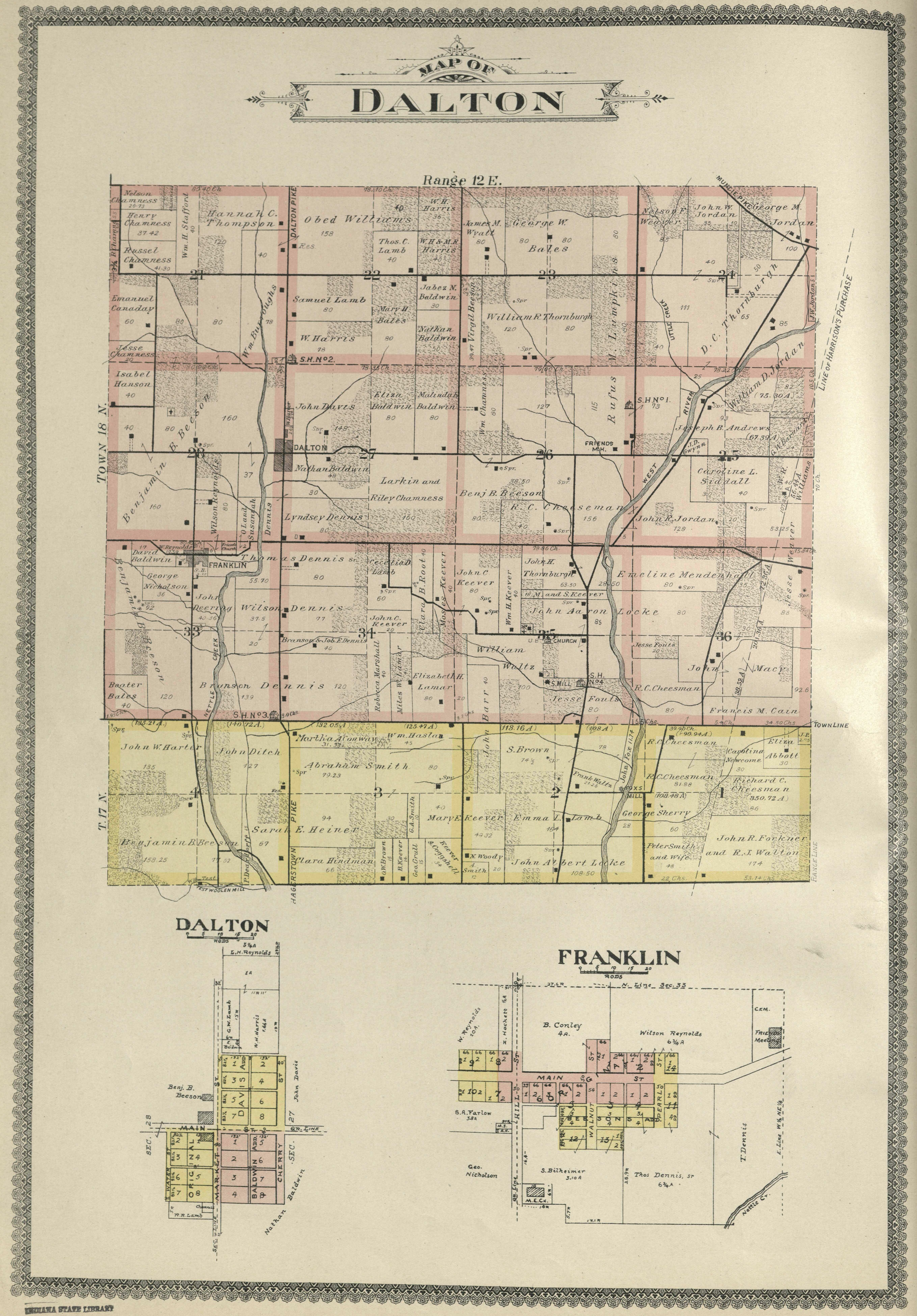
Map of Dalton, Indiana from The County of Wayne, Indiana, an imperial atlas and art folio. 1893.

Dalton was platted in 1828. An old variant name of the community was called Palmyra.

A post office was established at Dalton in 1838, and remained in operation until it was discontinued in 1901.
