= West Grove, Indiana =

- Unincorporated community
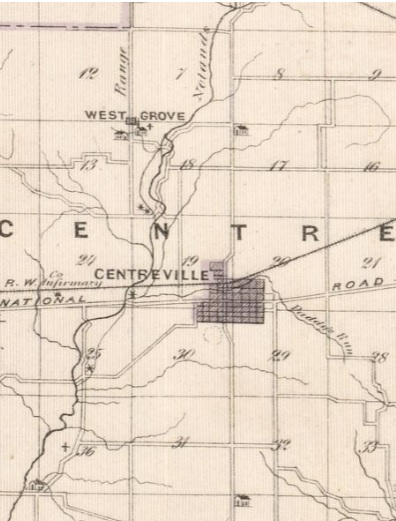
- Excerpt of 1876 county map showing West Grove laying NW of Centerville

- Location within Indiana Location within the United States
- Coordinates: 39°50′47″N 85°00′50″W
- Country: United States
- State: Indiana
- County: Wayne
- Township: Center
- Elevation: 1,050 ft (320 m)
- Time zone: UTC-5 (Eastern (EST))
  - Summer (DST): UTC-4 (EDT)
- ZIP code: 47330
- Area code: 765
- GNIS feature ID: 452207

West Grove was an unincorporated rural community in Center Township, Wayne County, in the U.S. state of Indiana.

== Geography ==
West Grove lies three miles northwest of Centerville, near the intersection of West Grove Road and Kempton Road.

== History ==
A Quaker meeting was organized in the area around 1815, and a log meeting house was built at the site. A frame meeting house replaced the log cabin in 1820. It was named "West Grove" by Robert Commons, one of the founding members of the meeting, for West Grove, Pennsylvania, where he had previously lived.

A school house was also located in the community, first erected in 1815 or 1816.

An 1869 newspaper article of a trip through the community reported that "on every side we had evidences of the prosperity of the community around West Grove; but we suggest that they plant a few trees around the school house ..."

1914 local newspaper articles describe services being resumed at the church after having "stood idle for some time," and ceremonies being held "observing the hundredth year since the founding of the church."

In 1952, after many years of not being used, the church was sold to Calvary Baptist Church in Richmond, and the building was torn down and its materials used to build Sunday school rooms for the purchaser. The West Grove Cemetery, which was affiliated with the meeting house, is still extant.

Today, the area of West Grove lies in the zip code for Centerville, though it is not within the city limits.

== See also ==
- Pennville, Indiana
