= Dalton Township, Wayne County, Indiana =

Dalton Township
- Township
- Location in Wayne County
- Coordinates: 39°58′40″N 85°09′33″W
- Country: United States
- State: Indiana
- County: Wayne

Government
  - Type: Indiana township

Area
  - Total: 15.79 sq mi (40.9 km^{2})
  - Land: 15.75 sq mi (40.8 km^{2})
  - Water: 0.04 sq mi (0.10 km^{2}) 0.25%
- Elevation: 1,180 ft (360 m)

Population (2020)
  - Total: 633
  - Density: 35.9/sq mi (13.9/km^{2})
- Time zone: UTC-5 (Eastern (EST))
  - Summer (DST): UTC-4 (EDT)
- Area code: 765
- GNIS feature ID: 453252

Historical population
Census	Pop.	Note	%±
1920	450		—
1930	391		−13.1%
1940	452		15.6%
1950	479		6.0%
1960	513		7.1%
1970	619		20.7%
1980	612		−1.1%
1990	580		−5.2%
2000	588		1.4%
2010	566		−3.7%
2020	633		11.8%
US Census:

Dalton Township is one of fifteen townships in Wayne County, Indiana, United States. As of the 2010 census, its population was 566 and it contained 239 housing units.

== History ==
Dalton Township was organized in 1847.

== Geography ==
According to the 2010 census, the township has a total area of 15.79 square miles (40.9 km^{2}), of which 15.75 square miles (40.8 km^{2}) (or 99.75%) is land and 0.04 square miles (0.10 km^{2}) (or 0.25%) is water. The streams of Corey Run, Flight Run, Franklin Run, Little Creek, Little Four Mile Creek, Mono Run, Propeller Run, Show Run, Single Run, West River and Wing Branch run through this township.

=== Unincorporated towns ===
- Dalton at 39.9833800°N 85.1813538°W
- Franklin at 39.9739356°N 85.1910761°W

(This list is based on USGS data and may include former settlements.)

=== Adjacent townships ===
- Union Township, Randolph County (northeast)
- Perry Township (east)
- Jefferson Township (south)
- Liberty Township, Henry County (southwest)
- Blue River Township, Henry County (west)

=== Major highways ===
- U.S. Route 35
- Indiana State Road 1
