= Greens Fork, Indiana =

- Town
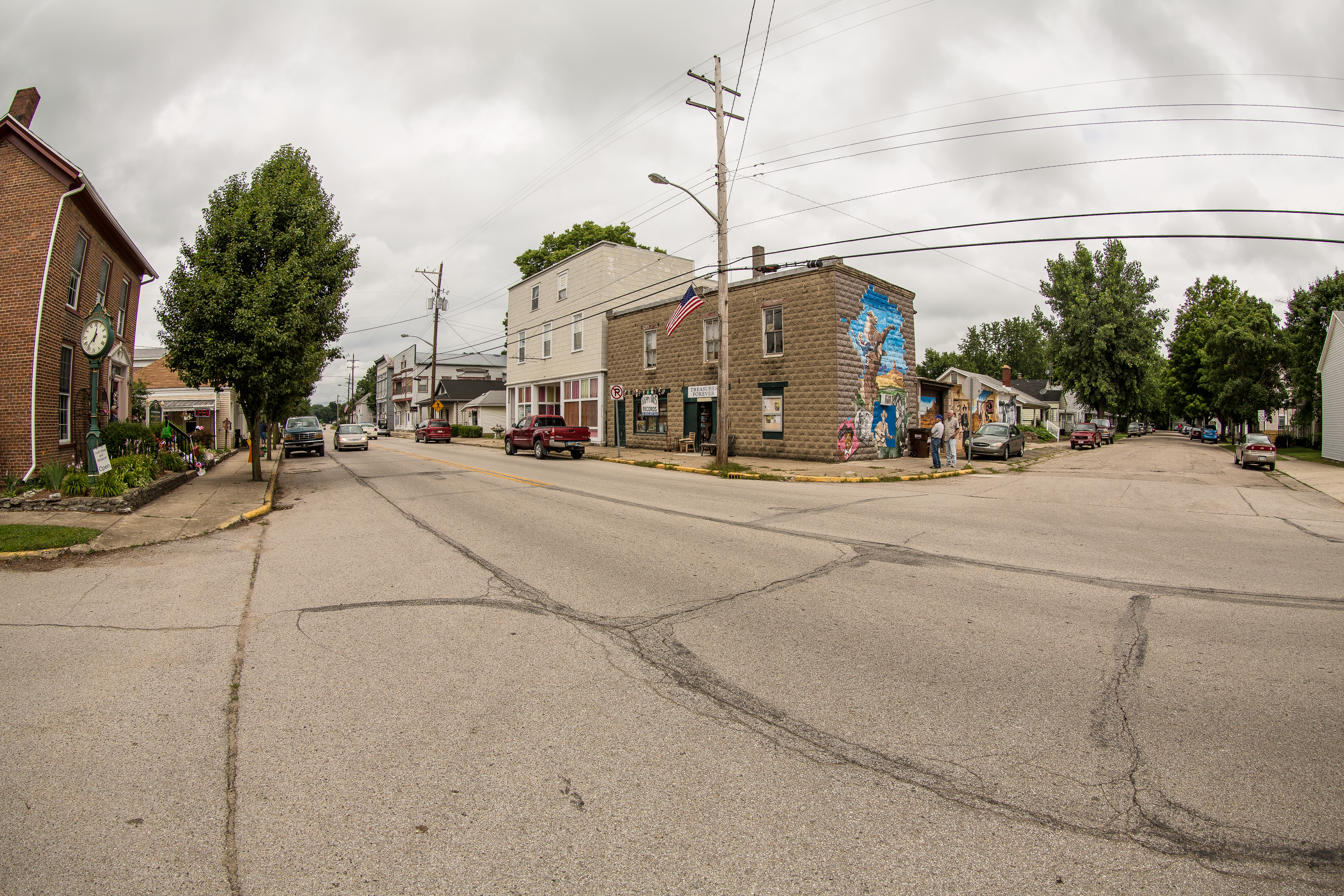

- Location of Greens Fork in Wayne County, Indiana.
- Coordinates: 39°53′30″N 85°02′28″W
- Country: United States
- State: Indiana
- County: Wayne
- Township: Clay

Area
  - Total: 0.14 sq mi (0.36 km^{2})
  - Land: 0.14 sq mi (0.36 km^{2})
  - Water: 0 sq mi (0.00 km^{2})
- Elevation: 1,007 ft (307 m)

Population (2020)
  - Total: 335
  - Density: 2,397/sq mi (925.5/km^{2})
- Time zone: UTC-5 (Eastern (EST))
  - Summer (DST): UTC-5 (EST)
- ZIP code: 47345
- Area code: 765
- FIPS code: 18-29754
- GNIS feature ID: 2396974

Greens Fork is a town in Clay Township, Wayne County, in the U.S. state of Indiana. The population was 335 at the 2020 census.

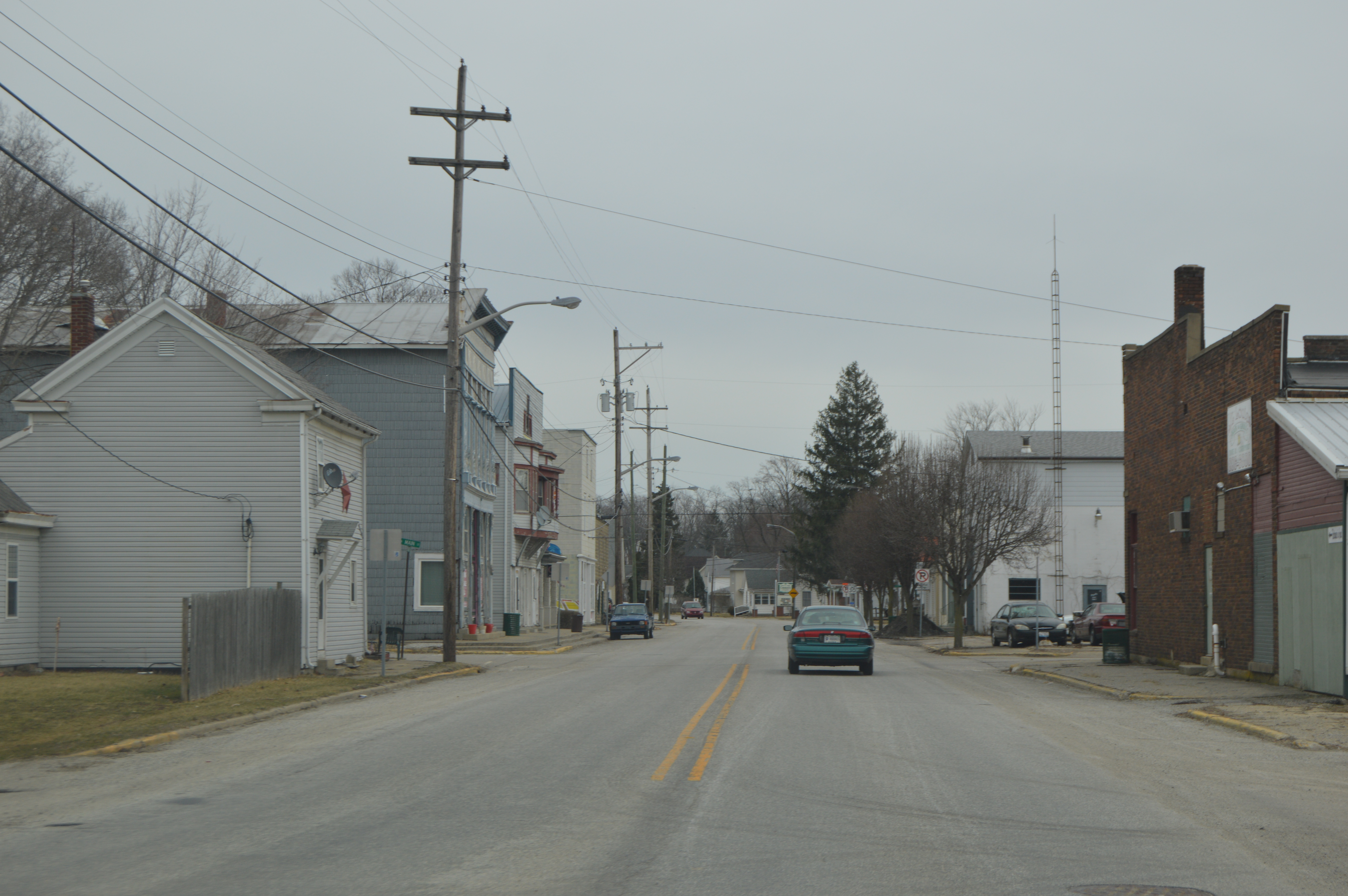
Pearl Street

== Geography ==
According to the 2010 census, the town has a total area of 0.16 square miles (0.41 km^{2}), all land.

== Demographics ==
Historical population
Census	Pop.	Note	%±
1920	380		—
1930	333		−12.4%
1940	413		24.0%
1950	413		0.0%
1960	474		14.8%
1970	444		−6.3%
1980	426		−4.1%
1990	416		−2.3%
2000	371		−10.8%
2010	423		14.0%
2020	335		−20.8%
U.S. Decennial Census

=== 2010 census ===
As of the census of 2010, there were 423 people, 147 households, and 113 families living in the town. The population density was 2,643.8 inhabitants per square mile (1,020.8/km^{2}). There were 161 housing units at an average density of 1,006.3 per square mile (388.5/km^{2}). The racial makeup of the town was 99.3% White, 0.2% Native American, 0.2% Asian, and 0.2% from two or more races.

There were 147 households, of which 38.8% had children under the age of 18 living with them, 51.7% were married couples living together, 20.4% had a female householder with no husband present, 4.8% had a male householder with no wife present, and 23.1% were non-families. 19.0% of all households were made up of individuals, and 4.1% had someone living alone who was 65 years of age or older. The average household size was 2.88 and the average family size was 3.25.

The median age in the town was 37.2 years. 27.2% of residents were under the age of 18; 8.3% were between the ages of 18 and 24; 25% were from 25 to 44; 25.5% were from 45 to 64; and 13.9% were 65 years of age or older. The gender makeup of the town was 46.8% male and 53.2% female.

=== 2000 census ===
As of the census of 2000, there were 371 people, 136 households, and 102 families living in the town. The population density was 2,462.8 inhabitants per square mile (950.9/km^{2}). There were 147 housing units at an average density of 975.8 per square mile (376.8/km^{2}). The racial makeup of the town was 97.57% White, 0.54% African American, 0.27% Asian, and 1.62% from two or more races. Hispanic or Latino of any race were 0.81% of the population.

There were 136 households, out of which 36.8% had children under the age of 18 living with them, 61.8% were married couples living together, 12.5% had a female householder with no husband present, and 25.0% were non-families. 20.6% of all households were made up of individuals, and 10.3% had someone living alone who was 65 years of age or older. The average household size was 2.73 and the average family size was 3.22.

In the town, the population was spread out, with 27.8% under the age of 18, 10.5% from 18 to 24, 28.6% from 25 to 44, 21.6% from 45 to 64, and 11.6% who were 65 years of age or older. The median age was 35 years. For every 100 females there were 98.4 males. For every 100 females age 18 and over, there were 90.1 males.

The median income for a household in the town was $36,406, and the median income for a family was $36,786. Males had a median income of $29,583 versus $25,357 for females. The per capita income for the town was $13,605. About 7.3% of families and 8.2% of the population were below the poverty line, including 13.9% of those under age 18 and 5.1% of those age 65 or over.

== History ==
The town of Greens Fork derives its name from the Greens Fork river on which it is situated. Both the river and the town get their name from a Delaware Indian named Johnny Green. The Greens Fork post office has been in operation since 1828.

In 2002, the town constructed a central wastewater treatment plant, sanitary sewer collection system and lift station to pump sewage to the treatment plant. The plant is rated at 40,000 gallons per day, and discharges its treated water to the Greens Fork River.

== Notable people ==
- Fred Gause (1879–1944) - born in Greens Fork; Justice of the Indiana Supreme Court
- Johnny Ringo (1850–1882) – born in Greens Fork; lived there with his family until they moved to Liberty, Missouri in 1856.
- Junior Saffer (1918–1982) – born in Greens Fork; a professional basketball player in 1937–38
