= Carroll Times Herald =

Twice-weekly newspaper in Carroll, Iowa, US

- Type: Twice-weekly newspaper
- Owner: Iowa Information Media Group
- Founder: Orlando H. Manning
- Founded: 1868
- Headquarters: 508 N. Court St. Carroll, IA 51401
- Circulation: 2,790
- Website: carrollspaper.com

The Carroll Times Herald is a twice-weekly newspaper in Carroll, Iowa.

== History ==
The Western Herald was first published on September 8, 1868. It was founded by Orlando H. Manning. The paper's name was changed to the Carroll Herald in March 1871. James Rhodes purchased the paper on May 1, 1929, and the paper transitioned to a daily a few months later. In 1936, the paper purchased the weekly Carroll Times and merged it with the Carroll Herald to form the Carroll Times Herald.

Rhodes died in January 1944. The Herald was purchased from his estate a year later by James W. Wilson. Before that he was coal miner turned journalist who was hired as the paper's business manager in 1929. He died in 1977 and the paper was inherited by his son James B. Wilson. His son and Douglas W. Burns were the paper's co-owner and vice president of news as of 2019.

Starting in 2017, the Herald began a series of stories about Carroll police officer Jacob Smith and his sexual relationships with teenagers. Smith resigned and sued the newspaper for libel. The lawsuit was dismissed on the basis of the truth of the allegations in the news stories, but legal expenses have forced the newspaper to move to a twice-weekly schedule.

In 2022, the Wilson and Burns families sold the Carroll Times Herald and the Jefferson Herald to the Wagner family.
