= Jacksonburg, Indiana =

- Unincorporated community
- Location within Indiana Location within the United States
- Coordinates: 39°51′11″N 85°06′21″W
- Country: United States
- State: Indiana
- County: Wayne
- Township: Harrison
- Elevation: 988 ft (301 m)
- Time zone: UTC-5 (Eastern (EST))
  - Summer (DST): UTC-4 (EDT)
- ZIP code: 47327
- Area code: 765
- GNIS feature ID: 436904

Jacksonburg is an unincorporated community in Harrison Township, Wayne County, in the U.S. state of Indiana.

== History ==
Jacksonburg was laid out and platted in 1815.

A post office was established at Jacksonburg in 1822, and remained in operation until it was discontinued in 1903.

== Notable residents ==
Politician Abner M. Bradbury resided in Jacksonburg. He is buried at the Jacksonburg Cemetery.
