= Middleboro, Indiana =

- Unincorporated community
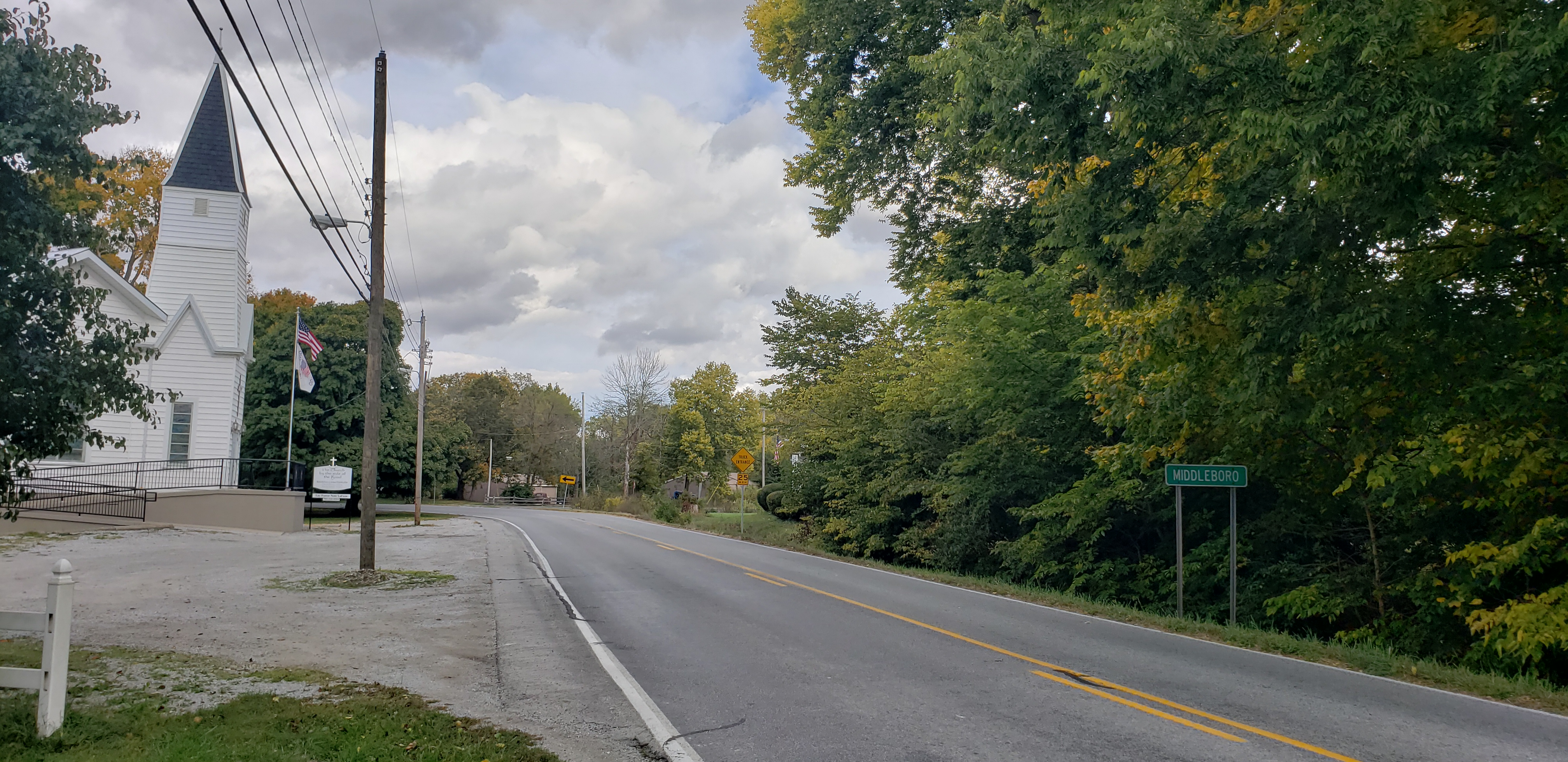

- Location within Indiana Location within the United States
- Coordinates: 39°53′38″N 84°49′55″W
- Country: United States
- State: Indiana
- County: Wayne
- Township: Wayne
- Elevation: 1,027 ft (313 m)
- Time zone: UTC-5 (Eastern (EST))
  - Summer (DST): UTC-4 (EDT)
- ZIP code: 47374
- Area code: 765
- GNIS feature ID: 439111

Middleboro is an unincorporated community in Wayne Township, Wayne County, Indiana near the city of Richmond.

== Features ==
- Middleboro Methodist Church is located on State Road 227 at the curve in Middleboro.
- The only streets in Middleboro are State Road 227, Porterfield Road, Hollandsburg Road, and three small side streets.

== Geography ==
Middleboro is located along State Road 227, about five miles northeast of Richmond.
