= Wayne County, Indiana =

County in Indiana, United States

- County
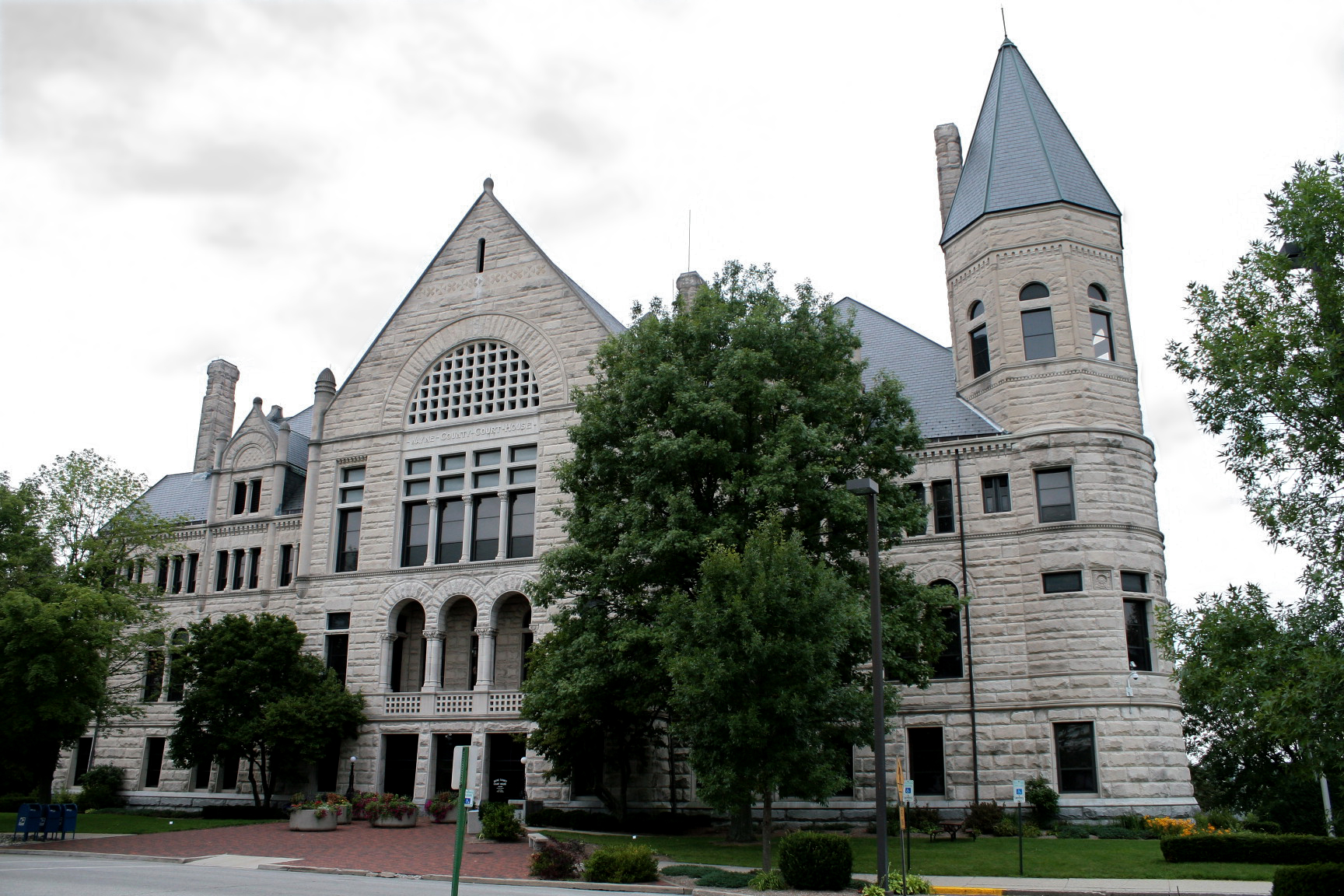
- Wayne County Courthouse

- Logo

- Location within the U.S. state of Indiana
- Coordinates: 39°52′N 85°01′W
- Country: United States
- State: Indiana
- Founded: 1811
- Named for: Anthony Wayne
- Seat: Richmond
- Largest city: Richmond

Area
  - Total: 404.34 sq mi (1,047.2 km^{2})
  - Land: 401.74 sq mi (1,040.5 km^{2})
  - Water: 2.60 sq mi (6.7 km^{2}) 0.64%

Population (2020)
  - Total: 66,553
  - Estimate (2025): 66,169 ▼
  - Density: 165.3/sq mi (63.8/km^{2})
- Time zone: UTC−5 (Eastern)
  - Summer (DST): UTC−4 (EDT)
- Congressional district: 6th
- Website: co.wayne.in.us
- Indiana county number 89

Wayne County is a county located in east central Indiana, United States, on the border with Ohio. As of the 2020 United States census, the population was 66,553. The county seat is Richmond. Wayne County comprises the Richmond, Indiana Micropolitan Statistical Area. Richmond is home to Earlham College, a small private liberal arts college.

== History ==
The first permanent European-American settlers in the area were Quakers from North Carolina. They settled about 1806 near the east fork of the Whitewater River, an area including what is today the city of Richmond. Jeptha Turner, the first white child in the county, was born here in 1806.

Wayne County was formed in 1811 from portions of Clark and Dearborn counties. It was named for Gen. "Mad" Anthony Wayne, who was an officer during the Revolutionary War. Wayne is mainly remembered for his service in the 1790s in the Northwest Indian War, which included many actions in Indiana and Ohio. Randolph County was formed from the northern portion of Wayne County, effective August 1818.

The first county seat was Salisbury, Indiana, a town which no longer exists. It was later moved to Centerville, Indiana in 1818, where it remained until Richmond was designated as the seat in 1873.

During the antebellum years, Wayne County had a number of stations on the Underground Railroad, a network of blacks and whites who aided refugees from slavery to reach freedom. Levi Coffin and his wife Catharine aided more than 1,000 refugees at their home in Fountain City, now designated as a National Historic Landmark and State Historic Site significant to the Ohio River National

In the 1920s, Indiana had the strongest Ku Klux Klan organization in the country, led by Grand Dragons D. C. Stephenson and Walter F. Bossert. Its members controlled the state legislature and had an ally in Governor Ed Jackson. At its height, national membership during the second Klan movement reached 1.5 million, with 300,000 in Indiana. Records show that Wayne County was home to Whitewater Klan No. 60. Robert Lyons, of Richmond, was national chief of staff for the Klan. During this period, the Klan had the most members in cities rather than rural areas; it attracted members new to cities who were unsettled by waves of immigrants from Europe and migrants from other regions of the US.

== Geography ==
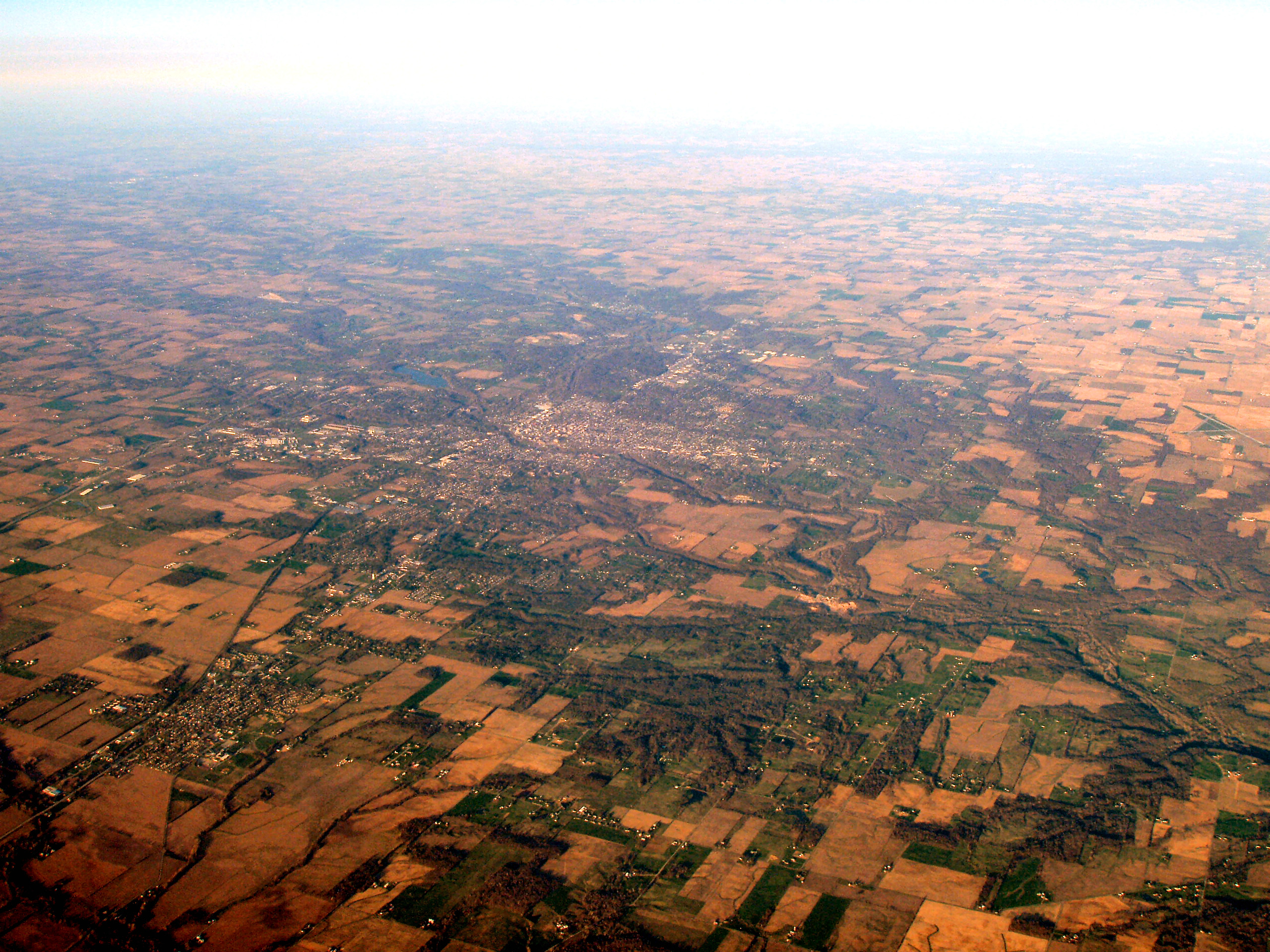
Richmond is the county seat.

According to the 2010 census, the county has a total area of 404.34 square miles (1,047.2 km^{2}), of which 401.74 square miles (1,040.5 km^{2}) (or 99.36%) is land and 2.60 square miles (6.7 km^{2}) (or 0.64%) is water. Wayne County includes Indiana's highest natural elevation, Hoosier Hill, at 1,257 feet (383 m).

=== Adjacent counties ===
- Randolph County (north)
- Darke County, Ohio (northeast)
- Preble County, Ohio (east)
- Union County (south)
- Fayette County (southwest)
- Henry County (west)

=== Cities ===
- Richmond

=== Towns ===
- Boston
- Cambridge City
- Centerville
- Dublin
- East Germantown
- Economy
- Fountain City
- Greens Fork
- Hagerstown
- Milton
- Mount Auburn
- Spring Grove
- Whitewater

=== Unincorporated towns ===
- Abington
- Bethel
- Chester
- College Corner
- Dalton
- Franklin
- Greenwood
- Jacksonburg
- Middleboro
- Pennville
- Pinhook
- Spring Grove Heights
- Wayne
- Webster
- West Grove
- Williamsburg

=== Townships ===
- Abington
- Boston
- Center
- Clay
- Dalton
- Franklin
- Green
- Harrison
- Jackson
- Jefferson
- New Garden
- Perry
- Washington
- Wayne
- Webster

=== Transit ===
- Roseview Transit

=== Major highways ===
- Interstate 70
- U.S. Route 27
- U.S. Route 35
- U.S. Route 40
- State Road 1
- State Road 38
- State Road 121
- State Road 227

== Climate and weather ==
Richmond, Indiana

Climate chart (precipitation, max. and min. temperature)
J	F	M	A	M	J	J	A	S	O	N	D
2.5 32 15	2.3 37 19	3.2 48 28	3.8 60 37	4.4 71 47	4.3 81 58	3.8 85 62	3.6 83 59	2.5 74 50	3 62 38	3.3 49 30	2.9 37 21
- █ Average max. and min. temperatures in °F
- █ Precipitation totals in inches
- Source: The Weather Channel
Metric conversion
J	F	M	A	M	J	J	A	S	O	N	D
64 0 −9	58 3 −7	80 9 −2	98 16 3	112 22 8	108 27 14	96 29 17	90 28 15	65 23 10	77 17 3	84 9 −1	74 3 −6
- █ Average max. and min. temperatures in °C
- █ Precipitation totals in mm

In recent years, average temperatures in Richmond have ranged from a low of 15 °F (−9 °C) in January to a high of 85 °F (29 °C) in July, although a record low of −29 °F (−34 °C) was recorded in January 1994 and a record high of 100 °F (38 °C) was recorded in July 1988. Average monthly precipitation ranged from 2.27 inches (58 mm) in February to 4.41 inches (112 mm) in May.

== Demographics ==
Historical population
Census	Pop.	Note	%±
1820	12,119		—
1830	18,571		53.2%
1840	23,290		25.4%
1850	25,320		8.7%
1860	29,558		16.7%
1870	34,048		15.2%
1880	38,613		13.4%
1890	37,628		−2.6%
1900	38,970		3.6%
1910	43,757		12.3%
1920	48,136		10.0%
1930	54,809		13.9%
1940	59,229		8.1%
1950	68,566		15.8%
1960	74,039		8.0%
1970	79,109		6.8%
1980	76,058		−3.9%
1990	71,951		−5.4%
2000	71,097		−1.2%
2010	68,917		−3.1%
2020	66,553		−3.4%
2025 (est.)	66,169	▼	−0.6%
U.S. Decennial Census; 1790-1960 1900-1990; 1990-2000 2010

=== Racial and ethnic composition ===
Wayne County, Indiana – Racial and ethnic composition Note: the US Census treats Hispanic/Latino as an ethnic category. This table excludes Latinos from the racial categories and assigns them to a separate category. Hispanics/Latinos may be of any race.
Race / Ethnicity (NH = Non-Hispanic)	Pop 1980	Pop 1990	Pop 2000	Pop 2010	Pop 2020	% 1980	% 1990	% 2000	% 2010	% 2020
White alone (NH)	71,427	67,335	64,967	61,322	56,689	93.91%	93.58%	91.38%	88.98%	85.18%
Black or African American alone (NH)	3,835	3,756	3,594	3,349	3,027	5.04%	5.22%	5.06%	4.86%	4.55%
Native American or Alaska Native alone (NH)	124	143	130	140	142	0.16%	0.20%	0.18%	0.20%	0.21%
Asian alone (NH)	201	289	356	522	707	0.26%	0.40%	0.50%	0.76%	1.06%
Native Hawaiian or Pacific Islander alone (NH)	x	x	18	44	12	x	x	0.03%	0.06%	0.02%
Other race alone (NH)	106	54	128	102	330	0.14%	0.08%	0.18%	0.15%	0.50%
Mixed race or Multiracial (NH)	x	x	933	1,634	3,151	x	x	1.31%	2.37%	4.73%
Hispanic or Latino (any race)	365	374	971	1,804	2,495	0.48%	0.52%	1.37%	2.62%	3.75%
Total	76,058	71,951	71,097	68,917	66,553	100.00%	100.00%	100.00%	100.00%	100.00%

=== 2020 census ===
As of the 2020 census, the county had a population of 66,553. The median age was 41.4 years. 22.3% of residents were under the age of 18 and 19.9% of residents were 65 years of age or older. For every 100 females there were 94.1 males, and for every 100 females age 18 and over there were 91.6 males age 18 and over.

The racial makeup of the county was 86.2% White, 4.6% Black or African American, 0.3% American Indian and Alaska Native, 1.1% Asian, <0.1% Native Hawaiian and Pacific Islander, 2.0% from some other race, and 5.7% from two or more races. Hispanic or Latino residents of any race comprised 3.7% of the population.

62.3% of residents lived in urban areas, while 37.7% lived in rural areas.

There were 27,409 households in the county, of which 27.7% had children under the age of 18 living in them. Of all households, 42.6% were married-couple households, 19.5% were households with a male householder and no spouse or partner present, and 29.6% were households with a female householder and no spouse or partner present. About 31.8% of all households were made up of individuals and 14.0% had someone living alone who was 65 years of age or older.

There were 30,752 housing units, of which 10.9% were vacant. Among occupied housing units, 65.7% were owner-occupied and 34.3% were renter-occupied. The homeowner vacancy rate was 2.5% and the rental vacancy rate was 10.4%.

=== 2010 census ===
As of the 2010 United States census, there were 68,917 people, 27,551 households, and 18,126 families residing in the county. The population density was 171.5 inhabitants per square mile (66.2/km^{2}). There were 31,242 housing units at an average density of 77.8 per square mile (30.0/km^{2}). The racial makeup of the county was 90.2% white, 5.0% black or African American, 0.8% Asian, 0.2% American Indian, 0.1% Pacific islander, 1.1% from other races, and 2.7% from two or more races. Those of Hispanic or Latino origin made up 2.6% of the population. In terms of ancestry, 24.4% were German, 11.8% were Irish, 11.0% were English, and 10.9% were American.

Of the 27,551 households, 30.5% had children under the age of 18 living with them, 47.4% were married couples living together, 13.3% had a female householder with no husband present, 34.2% were non-families, and 28.5% of all households were made up of individuals. The average household size was 2.41 and the average family size was 2.93. The median age was 40.2 years.

The median income for a household in the county was $47,697 and the median income for a family was $51,155. Males had a median income of $40,644 versus $30,194 for females. The per capita income for the county was $21,789. About 12.6% of families and 16.1% of the population were below the poverty line, including 24.9% of those under age 18 and 9.3% of those age 65 or over.

== Government ==
The county government is a constitutional body, and is granted specific powers by the Constitution of Indiana, and by the Indiana Code.

County Council: The county council is the fiscal body of the county government and controls all the spending and revenue collection in the county. Representatives are elected from county districts. The council members serve four-year terms. They are responsible for setting salaries, the annual budget, and special spending. The council also has limited authority to impose local taxes, in the form of an income and property tax that is subject to state level approval, excise taxes, and service taxes.

Board of Commissioners: The executive and legislative body of the county is made of a board of commissioners. The commissioners are elected at-large, county-wide, in staggered terms, and each serves a four-year term. Each commissioner must live in one of three districts which border lines are drawn by the Board of Commissioners, who also determine the County Council district boundaries. Redistricting of both bodies's district boundaries are typically completed after the US census is completed, but, unlike the council's districts who are required to be within a certain standard deviation of population so to create as equally populated districts as possible, the Commissioner districts are not required to be based on population and can factor in other variables such as industry, topography, etc. One of the commissioners, typically the most senior, serves as president. The commissioners are responsible for passing ordinances and conducting the business of the county, including managing the day-to-day functions of the county government and appointing members of the community to boards such as the Board of Zoning Appeals, County Drainage Board, or the County Planning Commission.

Court: The county maintains a small claims court that can handle some civil cases. The judge on the court is elected to a term of four years and must be a member of the Indiana Bar Association. The judge is assisted by a constable who is also elected to a four-year term. In some cases, court decisions can be appealed to the state level circuit court.

County Officials: The county has several other elected offices, including sheriff, coroner, auditor, treasurer, recorder, surveyor, and circuit court clerk. Each of these elected officers serves a term of four years and oversees a different part of county government. Members elected to county government positions are required to declare party affiliations and to be residents of the county.

== Politics ==
Wayne County is very Republican, even by the standards of traditionally Republican Indiana. It has not supported a Democrat for president since 1936. Since then, the Democrats have only come reasonably close to winning the county four times. Lyndon Johnson lost the county by only 87 votes in 1964, Bill Clinton held the GOP to pluralities during both of his bids, and Barack Obama came within three percent of carrying the county in 2008.

United States presidential election results for Wayne County, Indiana
Year	Republican		Democratic		Third party(ies)	
Year	No.	%	No.	%	No.	%
1888	6,138	60.91%	3,653	36.25%	286	2.84%
1892	5,714	57.27%	3,726	37.34%	538	5.39%
1896	6,841	61.67%	4,098	36.94%	154	1.39%
1900	6,736	61.04%	4,020	36.43%	279	2.53%
1904	7,390	66.32%	3,116	27.96%	637	5.72%
1908	6,731	57.34%	4,503	38.36%	504	4.29%
1912	1,851	16.11%	3,806	33.12%	5,834	50.77%
1916	6,112	51.84%	5,007	42.46%	672	5.70%
1920	12,631	59.52%	8,015	37.77%	575	2.71%
1924	11,487	59.75%	6,211	32.31%	1,527	7.94%
1928	15,936	67.52%	7,547	31.98%	118	0.50%
1932	12,683	47.85%	13,287	50.13%	536	2.02%
1936	12,126	45.98%	13,696	51.93%	551	2.09%
1940	15,058	51.27%	14,139	48.14%	173	0.59%
1944	15,295	54.51%	12,432	44.31%	332	1.18%
1948	15,445	57.81%	10,749	40.23%	522	1.95%
1952	20,068	62.36%	11,819	36.73%	293	0.91%
1956	20,157	61.76%	12,337	37.80%	144	0.44%
1960	19,764	60.66%	12,721	39.05%	95	0.29%
1964	15,342	49.93%	15,269	49.70%	113	0.37%
1968	17,335	53.66%	10,686	33.08%	4,287	13.27%
1972	21,610	73.60%	7,655	26.07%	96	0.33%
1976	16,697	57.20%	12,306	42.16%	188	0.64%
1980	16,981	60.53%	9,599	34.22%	1,472	5.25%
1984	18,955	64.80%	10,173	34.78%	123	0.42%
1988	16,388	61.37%	10,209	38.23%	105	0.39%
1992	12,221	44.69%	9,960	36.42%	5,165	18.89%
1996	12,188	47.24%	10,905	42.27%	2,708	10.50%
2000	14,273	56.75%	10,273	40.85%	605	2.41%
2004	16,586	59.97%	10,775	38.96%	296	1.07%
2008	14,558	50.83%	13,459	46.99%	624	2.18%
2012	14,321	56.21%	10,591	41.57%	565	2.22%
2016	16,028	62.66%	8,322	32.53%	1,229	4.80%
2020	17,567	63.47%	9,524	34.41%	588	2.12%
2024	17,526	65.33%	8,828	32.91%	473	1.76%

== Notable people ==
- Oliver P. Morton, 14th governor of Indiana, born in Wayne County
- Walter R. Stubbs, 18th governor of Kansas
- Ralph Teetor, inventor
- Levi Coffin, abolitionist, lived in Wayne Co, Indiana. He and his wife Catharine were active in the Underground Railroad, aiding refugees from slavery to reach Canada.
- Jim Jones, cult leader, attended school in Wayne County
- Timothy S. Jordan, Wisconsin politician, born in Wayne County
- Marcus Mote, early Indiana artist
- John Stark, California pioneer who rescued members of the Donner Party

== School Corporations ==
- Richmond Community Schools, Richmond
- Western Wayne Schools, Cambridge City
- Northeastern Wayne Schools, Fountain City
- Nettle Creek Schools, Hagerstown
- Centerville-Abington Community Schools, Centerville

== See also ==
- National Register of Historic Places listings in Wayne County, Indiana
