= Pinhook, Wayne County, Indiana =

Pinhook
- Unincorporated community
- Location within Indiana Location within the United States
- Coordinates: 39°48′56″N 85°03′26″W
- Country: United States
- State: Indiana
- County: Wayne
- Township: Center
- Elevation: 1,063 ft (324 m)
- Time zone: UTC-5 (Eastern (EST))
  - Summer (DST): UTC-4 (EDT)
- ZIP code: 47330
- Area code: 765
- GNIS feature ID: 441168

Pinhook is an unincorporated community in Center Township, Wayne County, in the U.S. state of Indiana.
