= Wayne Township, Wayne County, Indiana =

Wayne Township
- Township
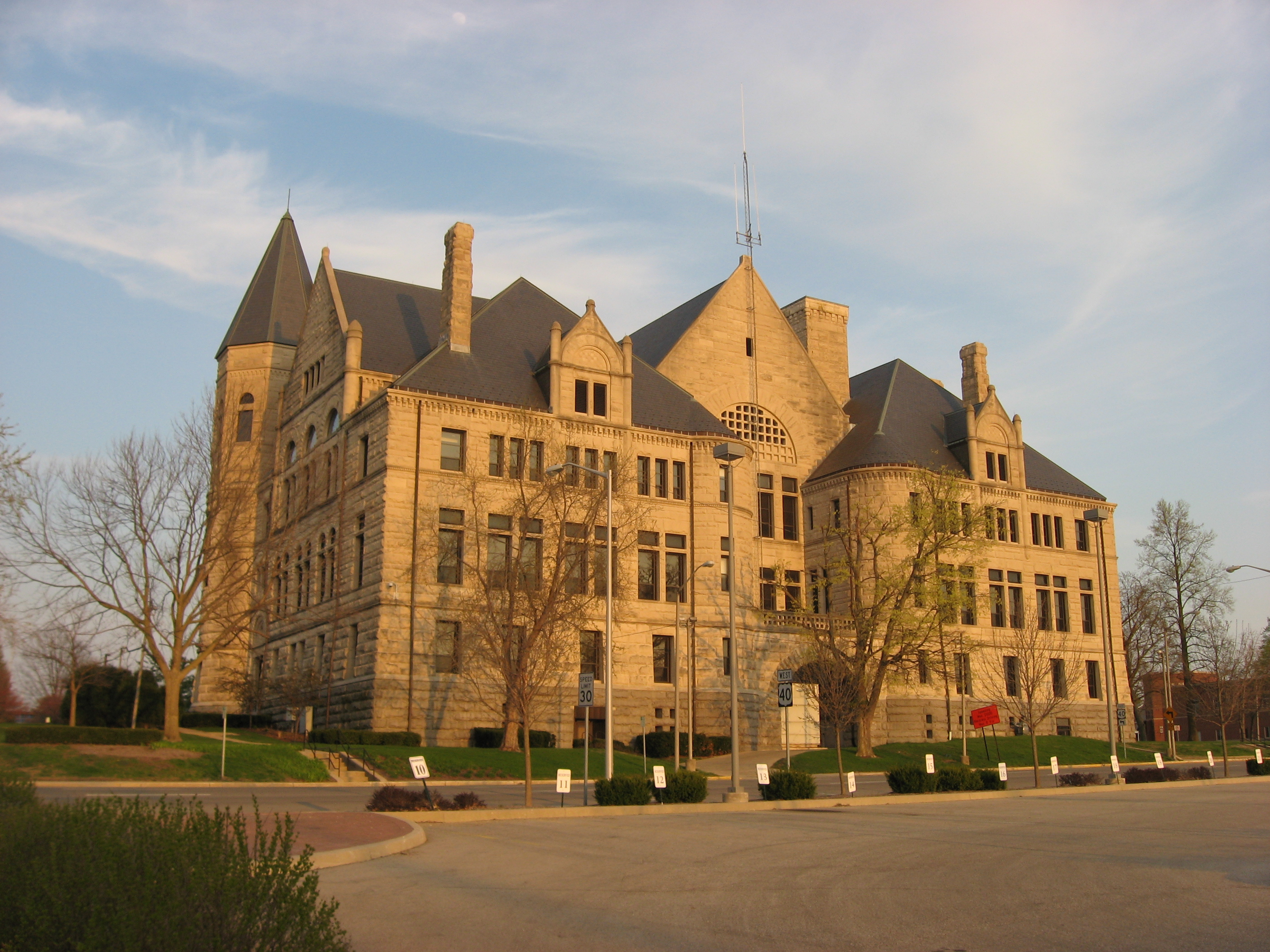
- The Wayne County Courthouse in Richmond

- Location in Wayne County
- Coordinates: 39°50′28″N 84°52′32″W
- Country: United States
- State: Indiana
- County: Wayne

Government
  - Type: Indiana township

Area
  - Total: 52.92 sq mi (137.1 km^{2})
  - Land: 52.2 sq mi (135 km^{2})
  - Water: 0.72 sq mi (1.9 km^{2}) 1.36%
- Elevation: 938 ft (286 m)

Population (2020)
  - Total: 39,852
  - Density: 789.5/sq mi (304.8/km^{2})
- Time zone: UTC-5 (Eastern (EST))
  - Summer (DST): UTC-4 (EDT)
- Area code: 765
- GNIS feature ID: 454042
- Website: www.in.gov/townships/wayne89/

Wayne Township is one of fifteen townships in Wayne County, Indiana, United States. As of the 2010 census, its population was 41,217 and it contained 19,510 housing units.

== History ==
Wayne Township was organized in 1810.

The Forest Hills Country Club and Abram Gaar House and Farm are listed on the National Register of Historic Places.

== Geography ==
According to the 2010 census, the township has a total area of 52.92 square miles (137.1 km^{2}), of which 52.2 square miles (135 km^{2}) (or 98.64%) is land and 0.72 square miles (1.9 km^{2}) (or 1.36%) is water. The streams of Boro Brook, Bridge Brook, Chester Creek, Clear Creek, Evans Creek, Middle Fork East Fork Whitewater River, Mud Creek, Short Creek, Spring Run, Tree Brook and West Fork/East Fork of Whitewater River run through this township.

=== Cities and towns ===
- Richmond (the county seat) (vast majority)
- Spring Grove

=== Unincorporated towns ===
- Chester at 39.8881034°N 84.8877386°W
- Greenwood at 39.8122703°N 84.8880159°W
- Middleboro at 39.8939372°N 84.8319040°W
- Spring Grove Heights at 39.8433812°N 84.8924606°W

(This list is based on USGS data and may include former settlements.)

=== Cemeteries ===
The township contains eight cemeteries: Earlham, Hoover Bulla, King, Lutherania, Ridge, Saint Andrews, State Line and Wernle.

=== Major highways ===
- Interstate 70
- U.S. Route 27
- U.S. Route 35
- U.S. Route 40
- State Road 38
- State Road 121
- State Road 227
