= Jefferson Township, Wayne County, Indiana =

Jefferson Township
- Township
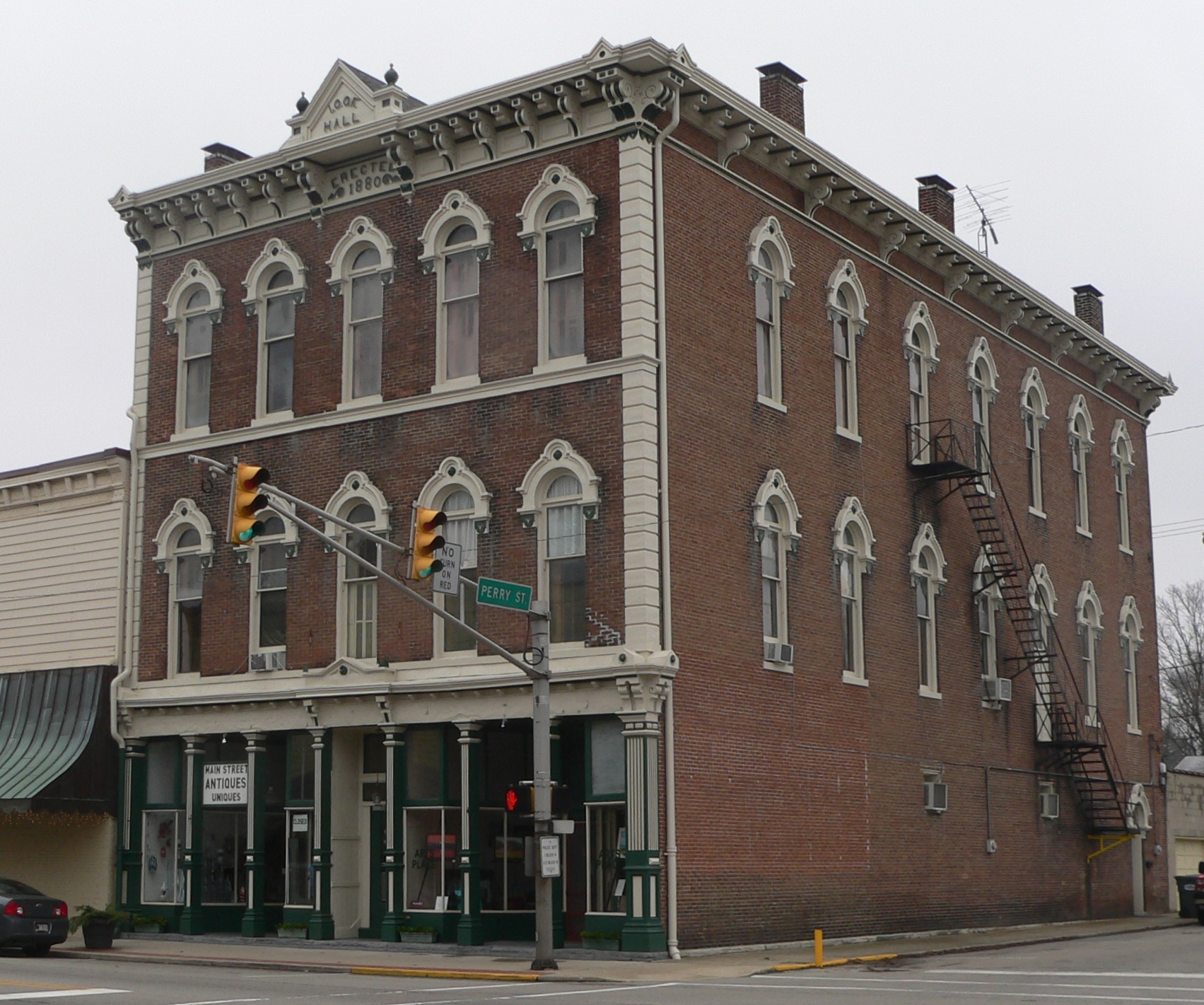
- The Hagerstown I.O.O.F Hall, a historic place in the township

- Location in Wayne County
- Coordinates: 39°54′40″N 85°08′51″W
- Country: United States
- State: Indiana
- County: Wayne

Government
  - Type: Indiana township

Area
  - Total: 27.66 sq mi (71.6 km^{2})
  - Land: 27.61 sq mi (71.5 km^{2})
  - Water: 0.05 sq mi (0.13 km^{2}) 0.18%
- Elevation: 1,014 ft (309 m)

Population (2020)
  - Total: 3,207
  - Density: 126.1/sq mi (48.7/km^{2})
- Time zone: UTC-5 (Eastern (EST))
  - Summer (DST): UTC-4 (EDT)
- Area code: 765
- GNIS feature ID: 453502
- Website: www.in.gov/townships/jefferson89/

Jefferson Township is one of fifteen townships in Wayne County, Indiana, United States. As of the 2010 census, its population was 3,482 and it contained 1,514 housing units.

== History ==
Jefferson Township was organized in 1834.

== Geography ==
According to the 2010 census, the township has a total area of 27.66 square miles (71.6 km^{2}), of which 27.61 square miles (71.5 km^{2}) (or 99.82%) is land and 0.05 square miles (0.13 km^{2}) (or 0.18%) is water. The streams of Awl Branch, Bat Branch, Bear Creek, Brick Creek, Civil Run, Hartley Run, Morgan Creek, Nettle Creek, Price Creek, Ulrich Creek, Value Run, West Lawn Run and White Branch run through this township.

=== Cities and towns ===
- Hagerstown

=== Adjacent townships ===
- Dalton Township (north)
- Perry Township (northeast)
- Clay Township (east)
- Harrison Township (southeast)
- Jackson Township (south)
- Liberty Township, Henry County (west)

=== Cemeteries ===
The township contains eight cemeteries: Olive Branch, Brick Church, Ulrich, St. Jacobs Lutheran, Felton Family, Baldridge, Unnamed, and West Lawn.

=== Major highways ===
- Indiana State Road 1
- Indiana State Road 38

=== Airports and landing strips ===
- Hagerstown Airport

== Education ==
Jefferson Township is served by the Hagerstown-Jefferson Township Public Library.

== See also ==
- Whitewater Canal
