= 2022 Little League World Series results =

Children's baseball competition results

The results of the 2022 Little League World Series were determined between August 17 and August 28, 2022 in South Williamsport, Pennsylvania. Twenty teams were divided into two groups, one with ten teams from the United States and another with ten international teams, with both groups playing a modified double-elimination tournament. In each group, the last remaining undefeated team faced the last remaining team with one loss, with the winners of those games advancing to play for the Little League World Series championship. Hawaii, the United States champions, defeated Curaçao, the international champions, 13-3 to win the 2022 championship, their second title in four years.

Double-elimination
United States
| United States | Winner's bracket | | | | | | | | |
|---|---|---|---|---|---|---|---|---|---|
| United States | (Tennessee) TN 5◄ (Massachusetts) MA 3 Linescore | (Washington (state)) WA 1 (F/5) (Hawaii) HI 11◄ Linescore | (Iowa) IA 7 (Indiana) IN 8◄ Linescore | (Texas) TX 8◄ (Pennsylvania) PA 3 Linescore | (Tennessee) TN 11◄ (Utah) UT 2 Linescore | (Hawaii) HI 12◄ (New York (state)) NY 0 (F/5); Linescore | (Tennessee) TN 5◄ (Indiana) IN 2 (F/7); Linescore | (Texas) TX 0 (Hawaii) HI 6◄ Linescore | (Tennessee) TN 0 (F/4) (Hawaii) HI 13◄ Linescore |
| United States | Loser's bracket | | | | | | | | |
| United States | (Iowa) IA 6◄ (Washington (state)) WA 3 Linescore | (Massachusetts) MA 5 (Pennsylvania) PA 7◄ Linescore | (Iowa) IA 10◄ (Utah) UT 2 Linescore | (Pennsylvania) PA 7◄ (New York (state)) NY 1 Linescore | (Indiana) IN 0 (F/4) (Pennsylvania) PA 10◄ Linescore | (Texas) TX 4◄ (Iowa) IA 0 Linescore | (Texas) TX 8◄ (Pennsylvania) PA 4 Linescore | (Texas) TX 1 (Tennessee) TN 7◄ Linescore | |
International
| International | Winner's bracket | | | | | | | | |
| International | (Curaçao) CUR 2◄ (Nicaragua) NIC 0 Linescore | (Canada) CAN 7◄ (Australia) AUS 0 Linescore | (Taiwan) TWN 2◄ (Italy) ITA 0 Linescore | (Puerto Rico) PUR 1 (Mexico) MEX 6◄ Linescore | (Curaçao) CUR 3 (Panama) PAN 9◄ Linescore | (Canada) CAN 6◄ (Japan) JPN 0 Linescore | (Taiwan) TWN 7◄ (Panama) PAN 0 Linescore | (Canada) CAN 0 (F/5) (Mexico) MEX 10◄ Linescore | (Taiwan) TWN 5◄ (Mexico) MEX 1 Linescore |
| International | Loser's bracket | | | | | | | | |
| International | (Italy) ITA 12◄ (Australia) AUS 7 Linescore | (Puerto Rico) PUR 1 (Nicaragua) NIC 3◄ Linescore | (Italy) ITA 0 (Curaçao) CUR 1◄ Linescore | (Japan) JPN 7 (F/11) (Nicaragua) NIC 8◄ Linescore | (Nicaragua) NIC 8◄ (Panama) PAN 1 Linescore | (Canada) CAN 2 (Curaçao) CUR 4◄ Linescore | (Curaçao) CUR 7◄ (Nicaragua) NIC 2 Linescore | (Mexico) MEX 1 (Curaçao) CUR 2◄ Linescore | |
Single-elimination
| International championship | Taiwan 0 Curaçao 1◄ Linescore | | | | | | | | |
| United States championship | Tennessee 1 Hawaii 5◄ Linescore | | | | | | | | |
| Third place game | Taiwan 2◄ Tennessee 0 Linescore | | | | | | | | |
| World championship game | Curaçao 3 (F/4); Hawaii 13◄ Linescore | | | | | | | | |

== Double-elimination stage ==
=== United States ===
Upper round 1 | Upper round 2 | Upper round 3 | Upper final | Final
August 19 – Game 10
August 17 – Game 2 | Utah | 2
August 22 – Game 22 (F/7)
Tennessee | 5 | Tennessee | 11
Tennessee | 5
Massachusetts | 3 | August 18 – Game 6
Indiana | 2
Iowa | 7
August 24 – Game 30 (F/4)
Indiana | 8
Tennessee | 0
August 19 – Game 12 (F/5)
Hawaii | 13
August 17 – Game 4 (F/5) | Hawaii | 12
August 22 – Game 24
(Washington (state)) Washington | 1 | (New York (state)) New York | 0
Hawaii | 6
Hawaii | 11 | August 18 – Game 8
Texas | 0
Texas | 8 | August 27 – U.S. Championship
Pennsylvania | 3 | Hawaii | 5
Tennessee | 1
Lower round 1 | Lower round 2 | Lower round 3 | Lower round 4 | Lower final
August 23 – Game 28
August 21 – Game 18 | Texas | 4 | August 25 – Game 34
August 20 – Game 14 | Iowa | 10 | Iowa | 0 | August 24 – Game 32 | Tennessee | 7
Iowa | 6 | Utah | 2 | Texas | 8 | Texas | 1
Washington | 3 | August 23 – Game 26 (F/4) | Pennsylvania | 4
August 22 – Game 20 | Indiana | 0
August 20 – Game 16 | Pennsylvania | 7 | Pennsylvania | 10
Massachusetts | 5 | New York | 1
Pennsylvania | 7

==== Winner's bracket ====
===== Game 2: Tennessee 5, Massachusetts 3 =====
August 17 3:00 pm EDT Howard J. Lamade Stadium
| Team | 1 | 2 | 3 | 4 | 5 | 6 | R | H | E |
|---|---|---|---|---|---|---|---|---|---|
| Tennessee ◄ | 0 | 1 | 4 | 0 | 0 | 0 | 5 | 9 | 0 |
| Massachusetts | 0 | 0 | 2 | 1 | 0 | 0 | 3 | 6 | 0 |
WP: Nash Carter (1–0) LP: Jayden Murphy (0–1); Boxscore

===== Game 4: Hawaii 11, Washington 1 =====
August 17 8:30 pm EDT Howard J. Lamade Stadium
| Team | 1 | 2 | 3 | 4 | 5 | 6 | R | H | E |
|---|---|---|---|---|---|---|---|---|---|
| Washington | 0 | 0 | 0 | 0 | 1 | – | 1 | 1 | 2 |
| Hawaii ◄ | 0 | 2 | 4 | 1 | 4 | – | 11 | 6 | 0 |
WP: Cohen Sakamoto (1–0) LP: Brody Santman (0–1); Home runs: WA: Liam Ferguson (1); HI: None; Notes: Completed early due to the run rule. Boxscore

===== Game 6: Indiana 8, Iowa 7 =====
August 18 3:00 pm EDT Howard J. Lamade Stadium
| Team | 1 | 2 | 3 | 4 | 5 | 6 | R | H | E |
|---|---|---|---|---|---|---|---|---|---|
| Iowa | 1 | 0 | 4 | 2 | 0 | 0 | 7 | 7 | 2 |
| Indiana ◄ | 4 | 3 | 0 | 0 | 0 | 1 | 8 | 7 | 3 |
WP: Heath Johnson (1–0) LP: Greyson Ballinger (0–1); Boxscore

===== Game 8: Texas 8, Pennsylvania 3 =====
August 18 7:00 pm EDT Howard J. Lamade Stadium
| Team | 1 | 2 | 3 | 4 | 5 | 6 | R | H | E |
|---|---|---|---|---|---|---|---|---|---|
| Texas ◄ | 0 | 0 | 2 | 0 | 6 | 0 | 8 | 9 | 1 |
| Pennsylvania | 2 | 0 | 0 | 0 | 0 | 1 | 3 | 6 | 0 |
WP: Kaiden Shelton (1–0) LP: Aspen Anderson (0–1); Boxscore

===== Game 10: Tennessee 11, Utah 2 =====
August 19 3:00 pm EDT Howard J. Lamade Stadium
| Team | 1 | 2 | 3 | 4 | 5 | 6 | R | H | E |
|---|---|---|---|---|---|---|---|---|---|
| Tennessee ◄ | 4 | 2 | 0 | 0 | 5 | 0 | 11 | 12 | 0 |
| Utah | 1 | 0 | 0 | 1 | 0 | 0 | 2 | 2 | 1 |
WP: Drew Chadwick (1–0) LP: Cody Ruffell (0–1); Notes: This is the first appearance for a team from Utah in Little League World Series history. Boxscore

===== Game 12: Hawaii 12, New York 0 =====
August 19 7:00 pm EDT Howard J. Lamade Stadium
| Team | 1 | 2 | 3 | 4 | 5 | 6 | R | H | E |
|---|---|---|---|---|---|---|---|---|---|
| Hawaii ◄ | 1 | 1 | 1 | 3 | 6 | – | 12 | 13 | 0 |
| New York | 0 | 0 | 0 | 0 | 0 | – | 0 | 0 | 1 |
WP: Jaron Lancaster (1–0) LP: Joey Lionetti (0–1); Home runs: HI: Kekoa Payanal 2 (2), Esaiah Wong (1), Jaron Lancaster (1); NY: None; Notes: Completed early due to the run rule. Boxscore

===== Game 22: Tennessee 5, Indiana 2 =====
August 22 3:00 pm EDT Howard J. Lamade Stadium
| Team | 1 | 2 | 3 | 4 | 5 | 6 | 7 | R | H | E |
|---|---|---|---|---|---|---|---|---|---|---|
| Tennessee ◄ | 0 | 0 | 0 | 1 | 1 | 0 | 3 | 5 | 8 | 2 |
| Indiana | 1 | 0 | 0 | 0 | 0 | 1 | 0 | 2 | 4 | 3 |
WP: Jack Rhodes (1–0) LP: Heath Johnson (1–1); Boxscore

===== Game 24: Hawaii 6, Texas 0 =====
August 22 8:00 pm EDT Howard J. Lamade Stadium
| Team | 1 | 2 | 3 | 4 | 5 | 6 | R | H | E |
|---|---|---|---|---|---|---|---|---|---|
| Texas | 0 | 0 | 0 | 0 | 0 | 0 | 0 | 1 | 0 |
| Hawaii ◄ | 2 | 0 | 2 | 0 | 2 | X | 6 | 7 | 0 |
WP: Cohen Sakamoto (2–0) LP: Jackson Wolfe (0–1); Home runs: TX: None; HI: Jaron Lancaster (2), Daly Watson (1); Boxscore

===== Game 30: Hawaii 13, Tennessee 0 =====
August 24 3:00 pm EDT Howard J. Lamade Stadium
| Team | 1 | 2 | 3 | 4 | 5 | 6 | R | H | E |
|---|---|---|---|---|---|---|---|---|---|
| Tennessee | 0 | 0 | 0 | 0 | – | – | 0 | 2 | 0 |
| Hawaii ◄ | 5 | 3 | 5 | X | – | – | 13 | 12 | 0 |
WP: Jonnovyn Sniffen (1–0) LP: Nash Carter (1–1); Home runs: TN: None; HI: Kama Angell (1), Kekoa Payanal (3), Cohen Sakamoto 2 (2), Daly Watson (2); Notes: Completed early due to the run rule. Boxscore

==== Loser's bracket ====
===== Game 14: Iowa 6, Washington 3 =====
August 20 3:00 pm EDT Howard J. Lamade Stadium
| Team | 1 | 2 | 3 | 4 | 5 | 6 | R | H | E |
|---|---|---|---|---|---|---|---|---|---|
| Iowa ◄ | 3 | 0 | 0 | 1 | 2 | 0 | 6 | 9 | 1 |
| Washington | 0 | 0 | 0 | 1 | 2 | 0 | 3 | 8 | 2 |
WP: Colin Townsend (1–0) LP: Major Rodarte (0–1); Notes: Washington is eliminated. Boxscore

===== Game 16: Pennsylvania 7, Massachusetts 5 =====
August 20 7:00 pm EDT Howard J. Lamade Stadium
| Team | 1 | 2 | 3 | 4 | 5 | 6 | R | H | E |
|---|---|---|---|---|---|---|---|---|---|
| Massachusetts | 1 | 0 | 0 | 0 | 2 | 2 | 5 | 9 | 1 |
| Pennsylvania ◄ | 0 | 0 | 0 | 4 | 3 | X | 7 | 8 | 2 |
WP: Tyler McGough (1–0) LP: Gavin Gillpatrick (0–1) Sv: Aspen Anderson (1); Home runs: MA: None; PA: Chase Link (1); Notes: Massachusetts is eliminated. Boxscore

===== Game 18: Iowa 10, Utah 2 =====
August 21 11:00 am EDT Howard J. Lamade Stadium
| Team | 1 | 2 | 3 | 4 | 5 | 6 | R | H | E |
|---|---|---|---|---|---|---|---|---|---|
| Iowa ◄ | 3 | 1 | 5 | 0 | 0 | 1 | 10 | 11 | 1 |
| Utah | 0 | 1 | 1 | 0 | 0 | 0 | 2 | 6 | 0 |
WP: Jeremiah Grise (1–0) LP: Reggie Ence (0–1); Notes: Utah is eliminated. Boxscore

===== Game 20: Pennsylvania 7, New York 1 =====
August 22 11:00 am EDT Howard J. Lamade Stadium
| Team | 1 | 2 | 3 | 4 | 5 | 6 | R | H | E |
|---|---|---|---|---|---|---|---|---|---|
| Pennsylvania ◄ | 0 | 0 | 3 | 4 | 0 | 0 | 7 | 10 | 2 |
| New York | 0 | 1 | 0 | 0 | 0 | 0 | 1 | 4 | 2 |
WP: Aspen Anderson (1–1) LP: Joey Lionetti (0–2); Home runs: PA: Chase Link (2); NY: None; Notes: New York is eliminated. Boxscore

===== Game 26: Pennsylvania 10, Indiana 0 =====
August 23 3:00 pm EDT Howard J. Lamade Stadium
| Team | 1 | 2 | 3 | 4 | 5 | 6 | R | H | E |
|---|---|---|---|---|---|---|---|---|---|
| Indiana | 0 | 0 | 0 | 0 | – | – | 0 | 3 | 3 |
| Pennsylvania ◄ | 2 | 2 | 2 | 4 | – | – | 10 | 9 | 0 |
WP: Braden Hatch (1–0) LP: Graham Vinson (0–1); Home runs: IN: None; PA: Chase Link (3); Notes: Completed early due to the run rule. Indiana is eliminated. Boxscore

===== Game 28: Texas 4, Iowa 0 =====
August 23 7:00 pm EDT Howard J. Lamade Stadium
| Team | 1 | 2 | 3 | 4 | 5 | 6 | R | H | E |
|---|---|---|---|---|---|---|---|---|---|
| Texas ◄ | 0 | 0 | 1 | 2 | 0 | 1 | 4 | 6 | 0 |
| Iowa | 0 | 0 | 0 | 0 | 0 | 0 | 0 | 2 | 1 |
WP: Kaiden Shelton (2–0) LP: Greyson Ballinger (0–2) Sv: Corey Kahn (1); Home runs: TX: Kaiden Shelton (1); IA: None; Notes: Iowa is eliminated. Boxscore

===== Game 32: Texas 8, Pennsylvania 4 =====
August 24 7:00 pm EDT Howard J. Lamade Stadium
| Team | 1 | 2 | 3 | 4 | 5 | 6 | R | H | E |
|---|---|---|---|---|---|---|---|---|---|
| Texas ◄ | 3 | 1 | 0 | 0 | 2 | 2 | 8 | 9 | 1 |
| Pennsylvania | 3 | 0 | 0 | 0 | 1 | 0 | 4 | 7 | 3 |
WP: Corey Kahn (1–0) LP: Aspen Anderson (1–2); Home runs: TX: Manny Castillo (1), Kaiden Shelton (2), Jacob Zurek (1); PA: None; Notes: Pennsylvania is eliminated. Boxscore

===== Game 34: Tennessee 7, Texas 1 =====
August 25 7:00 pm EDT Howard J. Lamade Stadium
| Team | 1 | 2 | 3 | 4 | 5 | 6 | R | H | E |
|---|---|---|---|---|---|---|---|---|---|
| Texas | 1 | 0 | 0 | 0 | 0 | 0 | 1 | 6 | 0 |
| Tennessee ◄ | 4 | 0 | 0 | 1 | 2 | X | 7 | 10 | 1 |
WP: Drew Chadwick (2–0) LP: Austin Cummings (0–1); Home runs: TX: None; TN: Josiah Porter (1); Notes: Texas is eliminated. Boxscore

=== International ===
Upper round 1 | Upper round 2 | Upper round 3 | Upper final | Final
August 19 – Game 9
August 17 – Game 1 | Panama | 9
August 22 – Game 21
Curaçao | 2 | Curaçao | 3
Panama | 0
Nicaragua | 0 | August 18 – Game 5
Taiwan | 7
Taiwan | 2
August 24 – Game 29
Italy | 0
Taiwan | 5
August 19 – Game 11
Mexico | 1
August 17 – Game 3 | Canada | 6
August 22 – Game 23 (F/5)
Canada | 7 | Japan | 0
Canada | 0
Australia | 0 | August 18 – Game 7
Mexico | 10
Puerto Rico | 1 | August 27 – Int'l Championship
Mexico | 6 | Taiwan | 0
Curaçao | 1
Lower round 1 | Lower round 2 | Lower round 3 | Lower round 4 | Lower final
August 23 – Game 27
August 21 – Game 17 | Canada | 2 | August 25 – Game 33
August 20 – Game 13 | Italy | 0 | Curaçao | 4 | August 24 – Game 31 | Mexico | 1
Italy | 12 | Curaçao | 1 | Curaçao | 7 | Curaçao | 2
Australia | 7 | August 23 – Game 25 | Nicaragua | 2
August 21/22 (F/11) – Game 19 | Nicaragua | 8
August 20 – Game 15 | Japan | 7 | Panama | 1
Puerto Rico | 1 | Nicaragua | 8
Nicaragua | 3

==== Winner's bracket ====
===== Game 1: Curaçao 2, Nicaragua 0 =====
August 17 1:00 pm EDT Volunteer Stadium
| Team | 1 | 2 | 3 | 4 | 5 | 6 | R | H | E |
|---|---|---|---|---|---|---|---|---|---|
| Curaçao ◄ | 0 | 1 | 0 | 0 | 0 | 1 | 2 | 6 | 0 |
| Nicaragua | 0 | 0 | 0 | 0 | 0 | 0 | 0 | 2 | 0 |
WP: Davey-Jay Rijke (1–0) LP: Luis García (0–1) Sv: Reangelo Decaster (1); Boxscore

===== Game 3: Canada 7, Australia 0 =====
August 17 7:30 pm EDT Volunteer Stadium
| Team | 1 | 2 | 3 | 4 | 5 | 6 | R | H | E |
|---|---|---|---|---|---|---|---|---|---|
| Canada ◄ | 0 | 1 | 0 | 3 | 1 | 2 | 7 | 11 | 1 |
| Australia | 0 | 0 | 0 | 0 | 0 | 0 | 0 | 5 | 3 |
WP: Lucas Weisser (1–0) LP: Alonzo Zaire Griffin (0–1) Sv: Jaxon Mayervich (1); Boxscore

===== Game 5: Taiwan 2, Italy 0 =====
August 18 1:00 pm EDT Volunteer Stadium
| Team | 1 | 2 | 3 | 4 | 5 | 6 | R | H | E |
|---|---|---|---|---|---|---|---|---|---|
| Taiwan ◄ | 1 | 0 | 0 | 1 | 0 | 0 | 2 | 7 | 0 |
| Italy | 0 | 0 | 0 | 0 | 0 | 0 | 0 | 1 | 0 |
WP: Hsiao Chao-Hsun (1–0) LP: Francesco Carlini (0–1) Sv: Shen Li-Chen (1); Boxscore

===== Game 7: Mexico 6, Puerto Rico 1 =====
August 18 5:00 pm EDT Volunteer Stadium
| Team | 1 | 2 | 3 | 4 | 5 | 6 | R | H | E |
|---|---|---|---|---|---|---|---|---|---|
| Puerto Rico | 0 | 1 | 0 | 0 | 0 | 0 | 1 | 2 | 1 |
| Mexico ◄ | 2 | 0 | 2 | 2 | 0 | X | 6 | 5 | 1 |
WP: Miguel Padilla (1–0) LP: Julian Estrada (0–1) Sv: Ivan Cuesta (1); Home runs: PUR: None; MEX: Miguel Padilla (1), David Zarate (1); Boxscore

===== Game 9: Panama 9, Curaçao 3 =====
August 19 1:00 pm EDT Volunteer Stadium
| Team | 1 | 2 | 3 | 4 | 5 | 6 | R | H | E |
|---|---|---|---|---|---|---|---|---|---|
| Curaçao | 0 | 0 | 0 | 3 | 0 | 0 | 3 | 5 | 2 |
| Panama ◄ | 4 | 1 | 0 | 0 | 4 | X | 9 | 7 | 1 |
WP: Jeykol De Leon (1–0) LP: Qshondrickson Doran (0–1) Sv: Alexander Fuentes (1); Home runs: CUR: None; PAN: Gabriel De Gracia (1), Jeykol De Leon (1); Boxscore

===== Game 11: Canada 6, Japan 0 =====
August 19 5:00 pm EDT Volunteer Stadium
| Team | 1 | 2 | 3 | 4 | 5 | 6 | R | H | E |
|---|---|---|---|---|---|---|---|---|---|
| Canada ◄ | 0 | 0 | 0 | 0 | 0 | 6 | 6 | 7 | 1 |
| Japan | 0 | 0 | 0 | 0 | 0 | 0 | 0 | 5 | 1 |
WP: Jaxon Mayervich (1–0) LP: Ryo Ayabe (0–1); Boxscore

===== Game 21: Taiwan 7, Panama 0 =====
August 22 1:00 pm EDT Volunteer Stadium
| Team | 1 | 2 | 3 | 4 | 5 | 6 | R | H | E |
|---|---|---|---|---|---|---|---|---|---|
| Taiwan ◄ | 0 | 0 | 4 | 2 | 0 | 1 | 7 | 6 | 0 |
| Panama | 0 | 0 | 0 | 0 | 0 | 0 | 0 | 4 | 3 |
WP: Liao Yuan-Shu (1–0) LP: Alexander Fuentes (0–1) Sv: Li Fang-Mo (1); Boxscore

===== Game 23: Mexico 10, Canada 0 =====
August 22 8:00 pm EDT Volunteer Stadium
| Team | 1 | 2 | 3 | 4 | 5 | 6 | R | H | E |
|---|---|---|---|---|---|---|---|---|---|
| Canada | 0 | 0 | 0 | 0 | 0 | – | 0 | 0 | 3 |
| Mexico ◄ | 0 | 6 | 2 | 0 | 2 | – | 10 | 11 | 1 |
WP: Hernan Mireles (1–0) LP: Benjamin Dartnell (0–1); Home runs: CAN: None; MEX: Miguel Padilla (2); Notes: Completed early due to the run rule. Boxscore

===== Game 29: Taiwan 5, Mexico 1 =====
August 24 1:00 pm EDT Volunteer Stadium
| Team | 1 | 2 | 3 | 4 | 5 | 6 | R | H | E |
|---|---|---|---|---|---|---|---|---|---|
| Taiwan ◄ | 1 | 0 | 0 | 2 | 0 | 2 | 5 | 7 | 1 |
| Mexico | 1 | 0 | 0 | 0 | 0 | 0 | 1 | 5 | 3 |
WP: Hsiao Chao-Hsun (2–0) LP: David Zarate (0–1) Sv: Li Fang-Mo (2); Boxscore

==== Loser's bracket ====
===== Game 13: Italy 12, Australia 7 =====
August 20 1:00 pm EDT Volunteer Stadium
| Team | 1 | 2 | 3 | 4 | 5 | 6 | R | H | E |
|---|---|---|---|---|---|---|---|---|---|
| Italy ◄ | 0 | 0 | 4 | 2 | 6 | 0 | 12 | 11 | 3 |
| Australia | 4 | 1 | 0 | 1 | 0 | 1 | 7 | 9 | 2 |
WP: Francesco Carlini (1–1) LP: Fletcher Adams (0–1) Sv: Jacopo Bussolati (1); Notes: Australia is eliminated. Boxscore

===== Game 15: Nicaragua 3, Puerto Rico 1 =====
August 20 5:00 pm EDT Volunteer Stadium
| Team | 1 | 2 | 3 | 4 | 5 | 6 | R | H | E |
|---|---|---|---|---|---|---|---|---|---|
| Puerto Rico | 1 | 0 | 0 | 0 | 0 | 0 | 1 | 3 | 1 |
| Nicaragua ◄ | 0 | 0 | 2 | 0 | 1 | X | 3 | 5 | 0 |
WP: Dereck Alonzo (1–0) LP: Yosniel Rosario (0–1) Sv: Johan Saravia (1); Notes: Puerto Rico is eliminated. Boxscore

===== Game 17: Curaçao 1, Italy 0 =====
August 21 9:00 am EDT Volunteer Stadium
| Team | 1 | 2 | 3 | 4 | 5 | 6 | R | H | E |
|---|---|---|---|---|---|---|---|---|---|
| Italy | 0 | 0 | 0 | 0 | 0 | 0 | 0 | 3 | 0 |
| Curaçao ◄ | 0 | 0 | 1 | 0 | 0 | X | 1 | 8 | 0 |
WP: Joshua Acosta (1–0) LP: Luca Tadei (0–1) Sv: Jay-Dlynn Wiel (1); Notes: Italy is eliminated. Boxscore

===== Game 19: Nicaragua 8, Japan 7 =====
August 21 1:00 pm EDT Volunteer Stadium
| Team | 1 | 2 | 3 | 4 | 5 | 6 | 7 | 8 | 9 | 10 | 11 | R | H | E |
|---|---|---|---|---|---|---|---|---|---|---|---|---|---|---|
| Japan | 0 | 0 | 3 | 0 | 1 | 0 | 0 | 2 | 0 | 0 | 1 | 7 | 13 | 2 |
| Nicaragua ◄ | 1 | 0 | 0 | 0 | 0 | 3 | 0 | 2 | 0 | 0 | 2 | 8 | 9 | 1 |
WP: Gabriel Gutiérrez (1–0) LP: Yota Morikawa (0–1); Home runs: JPN: Kaito Ohta (1); NIC: Dereck Alonzo (1); Notes: The game began on August 21 but was suspended after 2 innings (rain) and completed on August 22. Japan is eliminated. Boxscore

===== Game 25: Nicaragua 8, Panama 1 =====
August 23 1:00 pm EDT Volunteer Stadium
| Team | 1 | 2 | 3 | 4 | 5 | 6 | R | H | E |
|---|---|---|---|---|---|---|---|---|---|
| Nicaragua ◄ | 0 | 0 | 0 | 3 | 2 | 3 | 8 | 8 | 0 |
| Panama | 0 | 0 | 0 | 1 | 0 | 0 | 1 | 3 | 1 |
WP: Johan Saravia (1–0) LP: Max Pinzon (0–1); Home runs: NIC: Luis García (1); PAN: None; Notes: Panama is eliminated. Boxscore

===== Game 27: Curaçao 4, Canada 2 =====
August 23 5:00 pm EDT Volunteer Stadium
| Team | 1 | 2 | 3 | 4 | 5 | 6 | R | H | E |
|---|---|---|---|---|---|---|---|---|---|
| Canada | 0 | 0 | 0 | 0 | 0 | 2 | 2 | 5 | 0 |
| Curaçao ◄ | 2 | 0 | 2 | 0 | 0 | X | 4 | 5 | 0 |
WP: Reangelo Decaster (1–0) LP: Lucas Weisser (1–1) Sv: Davey-Jay Rijke (1); Notes: Canada is eliminated. Boxscore

===== Game 31: Curaçao 7, Nicaragua 2 =====
August 24 5:00 pm EDT Volunteer Stadium
| Team | 1 | 2 | 3 | 4 | 5 | 6 | R | H | E |
|---|---|---|---|---|---|---|---|---|---|
| Curaçao ◄ | 2 | 3 | 0 | 2 | 0 | 0 | 7 | 7 | 0 |
| Nicaragua | 0 | 1 | 0 | 0 | 0 | 1 | 2 | 4 | 3 |
WP: Davey-Jay Rijke (2–0) LP: Gonzalo López (0–1); Home runs: CUR: None; NIC: Luis García (2); Notes: Nicaragua is eliminated. Boxscore

===== Game 33: Curaçao 2, Mexico 1 =====
August 25 3:00 pm EDT Howard J. Lamade Stadium
| Team | 1 | 2 | 3 | 4 | 5 | 6 | R | H | E |
|---|---|---|---|---|---|---|---|---|---|
| Mexico | 0 | 0 | 0 | 1 | 0 | 0 | 1 | 1 | 1 |
| Curaçao ◄ | 0 | 0 | 0 | 0 | 2 | X | 2 | 4 | 0 |
WP: Jay-Dlynn Wiel (1–0) LP: David Zarate (0–2); Home runs: MEX: David Zarate (2); CUR: None; Notes: Mexico is eliminated. Boxscore

== Single-elimination stage ==
=== International championship: Curaçao 1, Taiwan 0 ===
August 27 12:30 pm EDT Howard J. Lamade Stadium
| Team | 1 | 2 | 3 | 4 | 5 | 6 | R | H | E |
|---|---|---|---|---|---|---|---|---|---|
| Taiwan | 0 | 0 | 0 | 0 | 0 | 0 | 0 | 4 | 1 |
| Curaçao ◄ | 0 | 0 | 1 | 0 | 0 | X | 1 | 3 | 0 |
WP: Reangelo Decaster (2–0) LP: Li Fang-Mo (0–1) Sv: Qshondrickson Doran (1); Boxscore

=== United States championship: Hawaii 5, Tennessee 1 ===
August 27 3:30 pm EDT Howard J. Lamade Stadium
| Team | 1 | 2 | 3 | 4 | 5 | 6 | R | H | E |
|---|---|---|---|---|---|---|---|---|---|
| Tennessee | 0 | 0 | 0 | 1 | 0 | 0 | 1 | 3 | 0 |
| Hawaii ◄ | 1 | 2 | 0 | 2 | 0 | X | 5 | 6 | 2 |
WP: Cohen Sakamoto (3–0) LP: Trent McNiel (0–1); Home runs: TN: None; HI: Ruston Hiyoto (1); Boxscore

=== Third place game: Taiwan 2, Tennessee 0 ===
August 28 10:00 am EDT Howard J. Lamade Stadium
| Team | 1 | 2 | 3 | 4 | 5 | 6 | R | H | E |
|---|---|---|---|---|---|---|---|---|---|
| Taiwan ◄ | 0 | 1 | 0 | 1 | 0 | 0 | 2 | 3 | 0 |
| Tennessee | 0 | 0 | 0 | 0 | 0 | 0 | 0 | 3 | 2 |
WP: Liao Yuan-Shu (2–0) LP: Jack Rhodes (1–1); Boxscore

=== World championship game: Hawaii 13, Curaçao 3 ===
August 28 3:00 pm EDT Howard J. Lamade Stadium
| Team | 1 | 2 | 3 | 4 | 5 | 6 | R | H | E |
|---|---|---|---|---|---|---|---|---|---|
| Curaçao | 1 | 0 | 0 | 2 | – | – | 3 | 3 | 1 |
| Hawaii ◄ | 2 | 3 | 7 | 1 | – | – | 13 | 7 | 1 |
WP: Jaron Lancaster (2–0) LP: Shemar Jacobus (0–1); Home runs: CUR: None; HI: Kekoa Payanal (4), Kama Angell (2); Notes: Completed early due to the run rule. Hawaii wins the Little League World Series. Boxscore
