= Stonebraker =

Stonebraker is a surname. Notable people with the surname include:

- John Stonebraker (1918–2000), American football player
- Michael Stonebraker (born 1943), American computer scientist

== See also ==
- John and Caroline Stonebraker House
- Stonebraker and Harbaugh–Shafer Building

== See also ==
- Stonebreaker
