= Charles H. Black =

American carriage maker and automobile pioneer

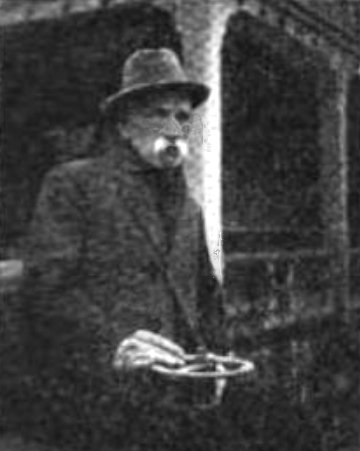
- Born: October 5, 1850; Hagerstown, Indiana, U.S.
- Died: August 19, 1918 (aged 67); Indianapolis, Indiana, U.S.
- Resting place: Crown Hill Cemetery and Arboretum, Section 25, Lot 185; 39.8184878°N 86.1703624°W
- Occupation: Businessman
- Known for: Automobile pioneer

Charles H. Black (October 5, 1850 – August 19, 1918) was an American carriage maker and automobile pioneer whose business was in Indianapolis, Indiana.

== Early life ==
Charles H. Black was born in Hagerstown, Indiana, on October 5, 1850. When he was a child, his family moved to Indianapolis, where he received his education in the city's public schools. He went on to serve in the Union Army during the American Civil War, as did his younger brother Edward E. Black, who became the Union's youngest soldier at the age of only eight.

== Career ==
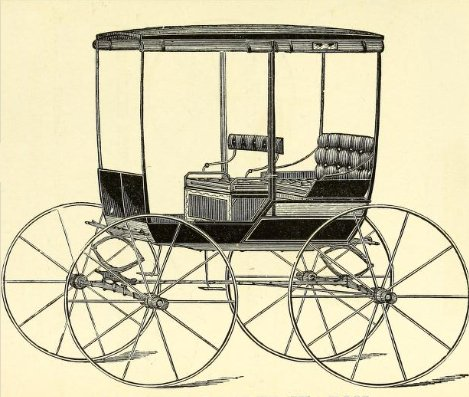
Jagger Wagon carriage by Charles H. Black as found in the Polk's Indianapolis (Marion County, Ind.) city directory (1880)

After working in several carriage factories, Black set up on his account as a blacksmith and then as a carriage maker, with premises at 44 Pennsylvania Street, Indianapolis, gaining a reputation as a craftsman and design innovator. Black's main business was in producing conventional horse-drawn vehicles, including buggies, delivery wagons, hearses, and the first patrol wagon operated by the Indianapolis Police Department.

In 1891, as he later reported in the Indianapolis News (1913) and the American Chauffeur (1916), he completed and tested his first steam-powered "chug buggy". However, he rejected the steam engine for use in an automobile as being "too cumbersome and hard to manage" and continued to search for a more suitable engine. Later the same year, 1891, he states that he imported a Karl Benz gasoline-powered engine from Germany and mounted it into a "horseless carriage" which he tried out successfully in Indianapolis on the paved streets of Circle and Delaware, becoming the first person to drive an automobile in the city. He continued to drive this vehicle for the next twenty years.

Remarkably, research has failed to bring to light contemporary reports from the 1890s of Black's first automobile, but eyewitness accounts and early photographs exist. A business card of the C. H. Black Manufacturing Company dated 1892 shows a picture of Black's first automobile with the legend "Estimates furnished for power-equipped vehicles of any style", and two of his early vehicles are extant, one on display at the Children's Museum of Indianapolis and the other in a private collection. Black's design failed to go into larger-scale production, largely because its ignition system required the use of a kerosene torch.

In 1899, Black went on to organize an automobile manufacturing company. The city of Indianapolis claims him as the inventor of the first internal combustion engine automobile, while other inventors from the city introduced both the six-cylinder engine and the concept of four-wheel brakes.

== Death ==
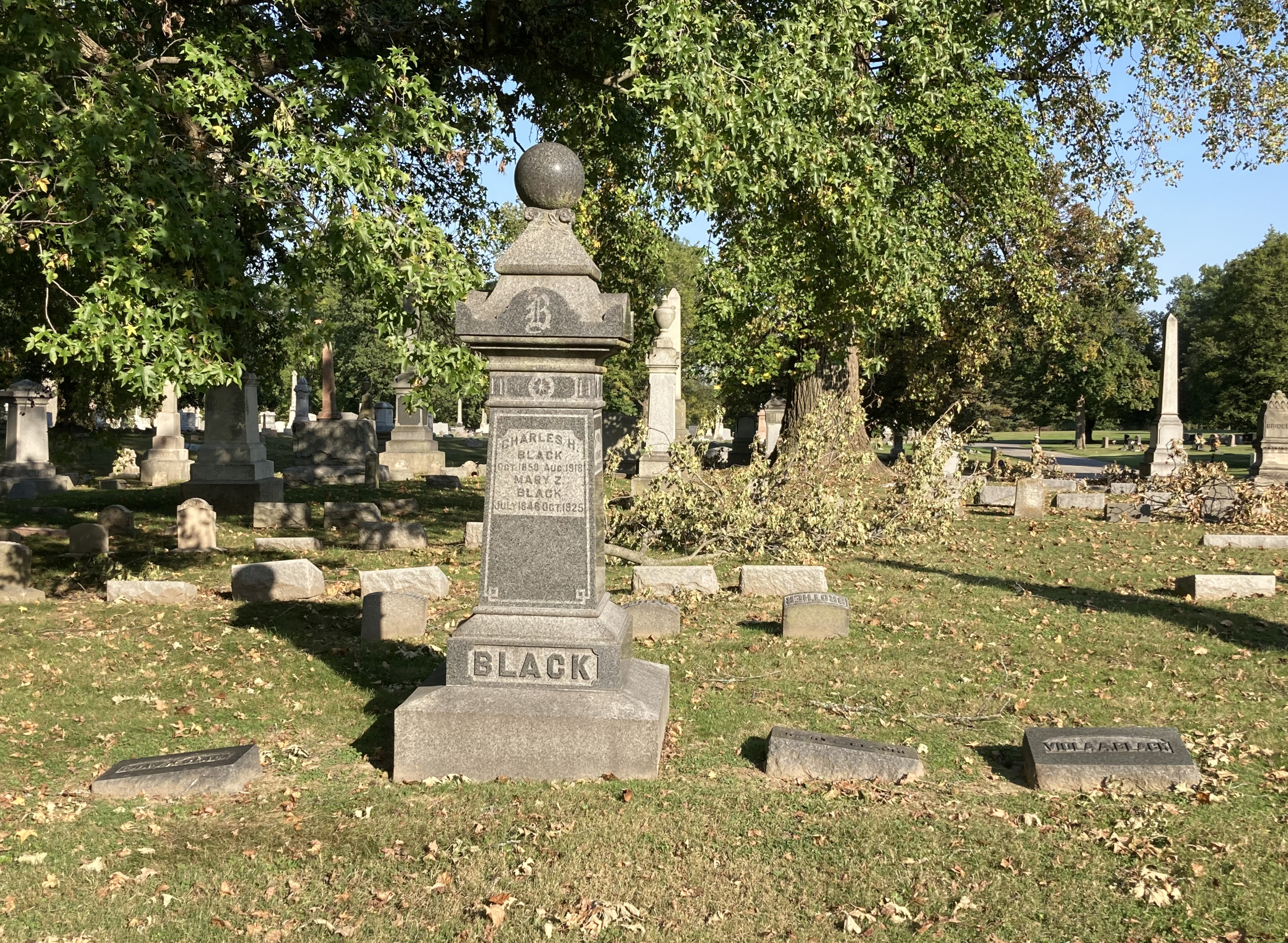
Black's grave at Crown Hill Cemetery

Black died on August 19, 1918, at his home in Indianapolis. He is buried at the Crown Hill Cemetery.

== See also ==
- Brass Era car
- Buckeye gasoline buggy
