= Stonebreaker =

Stonebreaker is a surname. Notable people with the surname include:

- Mike Stonebreaker (born 1967), American football player
- Steve Stonebreaker (1938–1995), American football player

== See also ==
- The Stonebreaker, painting by Henry Wallis
- Stonebreakers Hut, road in the Isle of Man
- Stonebraker, surname
