= Hagerstown I.O.O.F. Hall =

- U.S. National Register of Historic Places
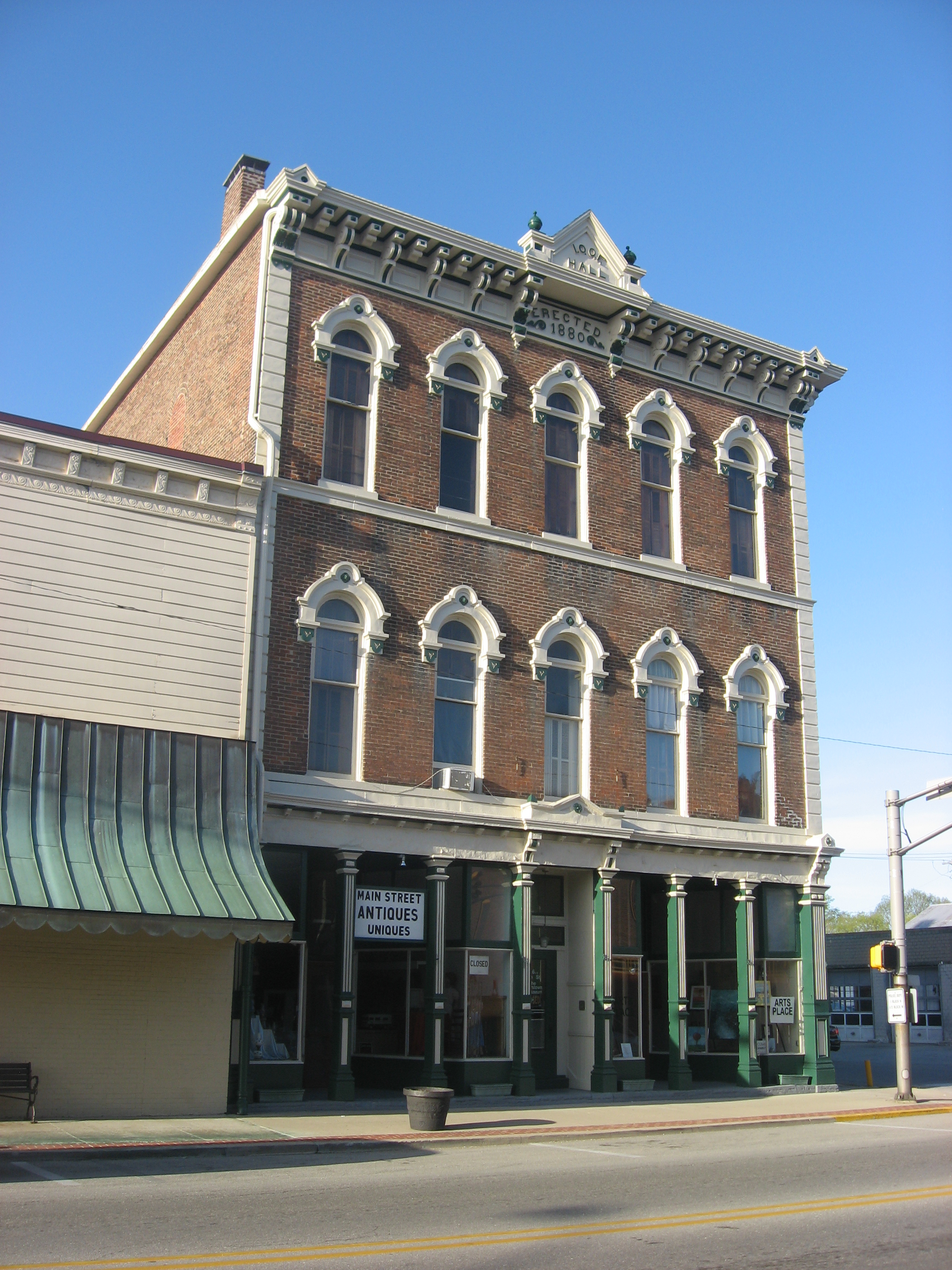
- Hagerstown I.O.O.F. Hall, March 2012

- Location within Indiana Location within the United States
- Location: Main and Perry Sts., Hagerstown, Indiana
- Coordinates: 39°54′40″N 85°9′37″W
- Area: less than one acre
- Built: 1880-1883
- Architect: Waltz, W. M.
- Architectural style: Italianate
- NRHP reference No.: 78000041
- Added to NRHP: January 3, 1978

Hagerstown I.O.O.F. Hall is a historic Independent Order of Odd Fellows hall located at Hagerstown, Indiana. It was built between 1880 and 1883, and is a three-story, five bay by seven bay, Italianate style brick commercial building. It has a cast iron storefront on the first floor and a low hipped roof. When constructed it had stores on the first floor and an opera house and Odd Fellows hall on the second and third floors.

It was added to the National Register of Historic Places in 1978.
