= Hagerstown, Indiana =

- Town
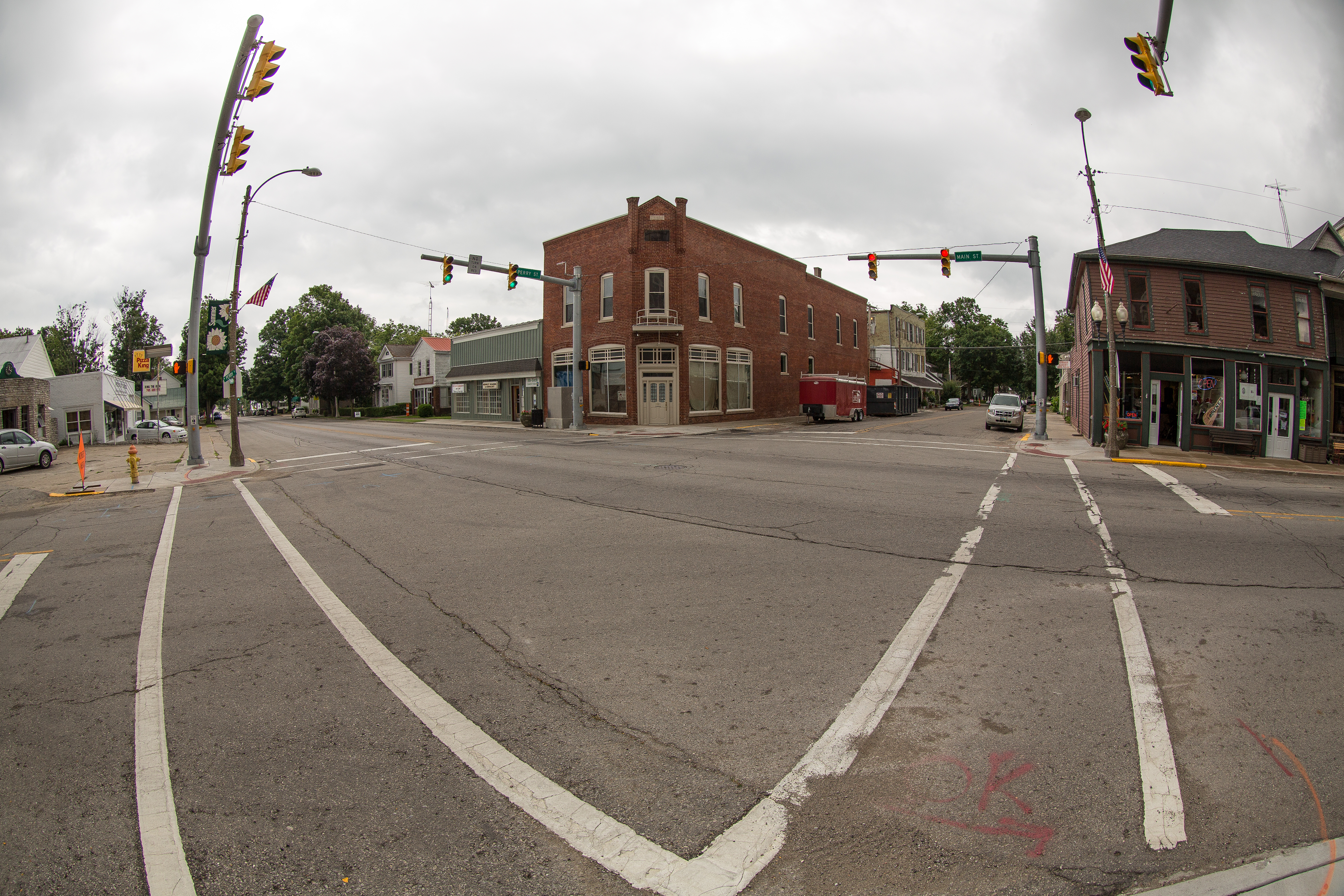

- Location of Hagerstown in Wayne County, Indiana
- Coordinates: 39°54′41″N 85°09′20″W
- Country: United States
- State: Indiana
- County: Wayne
- Township: Jefferson

Area
  - Total: 1.32 sq mi (3.42 km^{2})
  - Land: 1.32 sq mi (3.41 km^{2})
  - Water: 0.0039 sq mi (0.01 km^{2})
- Elevation: 981 ft (299 m)

Population (2020)
  - Total: 1,681
  - Density: 1,275.2/sq mi (492.35/km^{2})
- Time zone: UTC-5 (Eastern (EST))
  - Summer (DST): UTC-4 (EDT)
- ZIP code: 47346
- Area code: 765
- FIPS code: 18-30402
- GNIS feature ID: 2396981
- Website: hagerstown.in.gov

Hagerstown is a town in Jefferson Township, Wayne County, in the U.S. state of Indiana. As of the 2020 census, the population was 1,681.

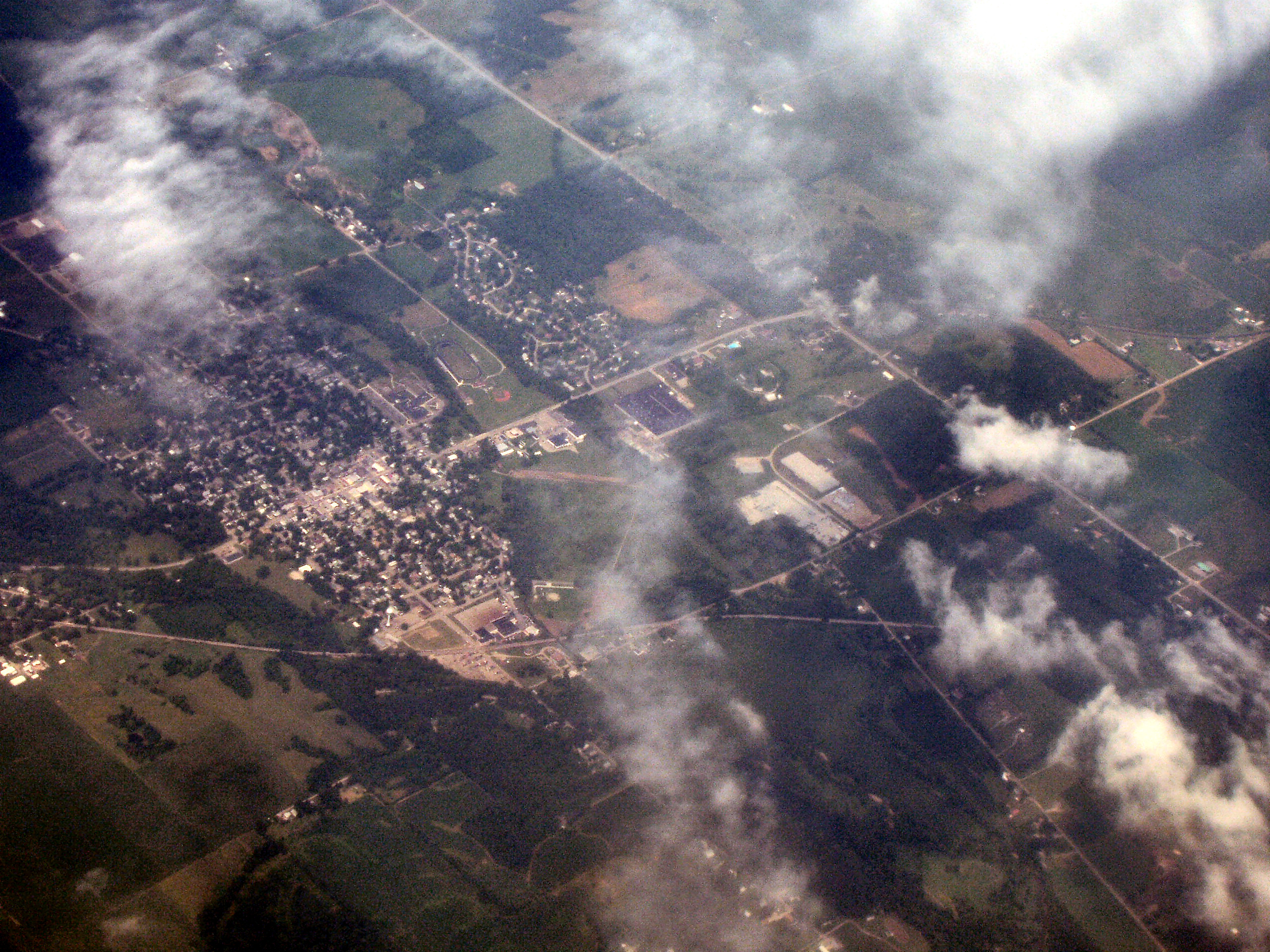
Hagerstown from the air, looking northeast.

== History ==
Hagerstown was laid out and platted in 1832. The town was named after the city of Hagerstown, Maryland. The Hagerstown post office has been in operation since 1836.

The Whitewater Canal, which was built in the mid-19th century and extends to Lawrenceburg, Indiana, has its northern terminus in Hagerstown. This section was funded by the Hagerstown Canal Company.

The Hagerstown I.O.O.F. Hall and John and Caroline Stonebraker House are listed on the National Register of Historic Places.

== Geography ==
The town lies 61 miles (98 kilometers) ENE of Indianapolis, Indiana, 17 miles (27 kilometers) NW of Richmond, Indiana, and 63 miles (101 kilometers) WNW of Dayton, Ohio in the Midwestern region of the United States.

Terrain surrounding Hagerstown consists of flat land at an elevation of roughly 1000 feet above sea level that is used primarily for agriculture.

According to the 2010 census, Hagerstown has a total area of 1.34 square miles (3.47 km^{2}), all land.

== Demographics ==
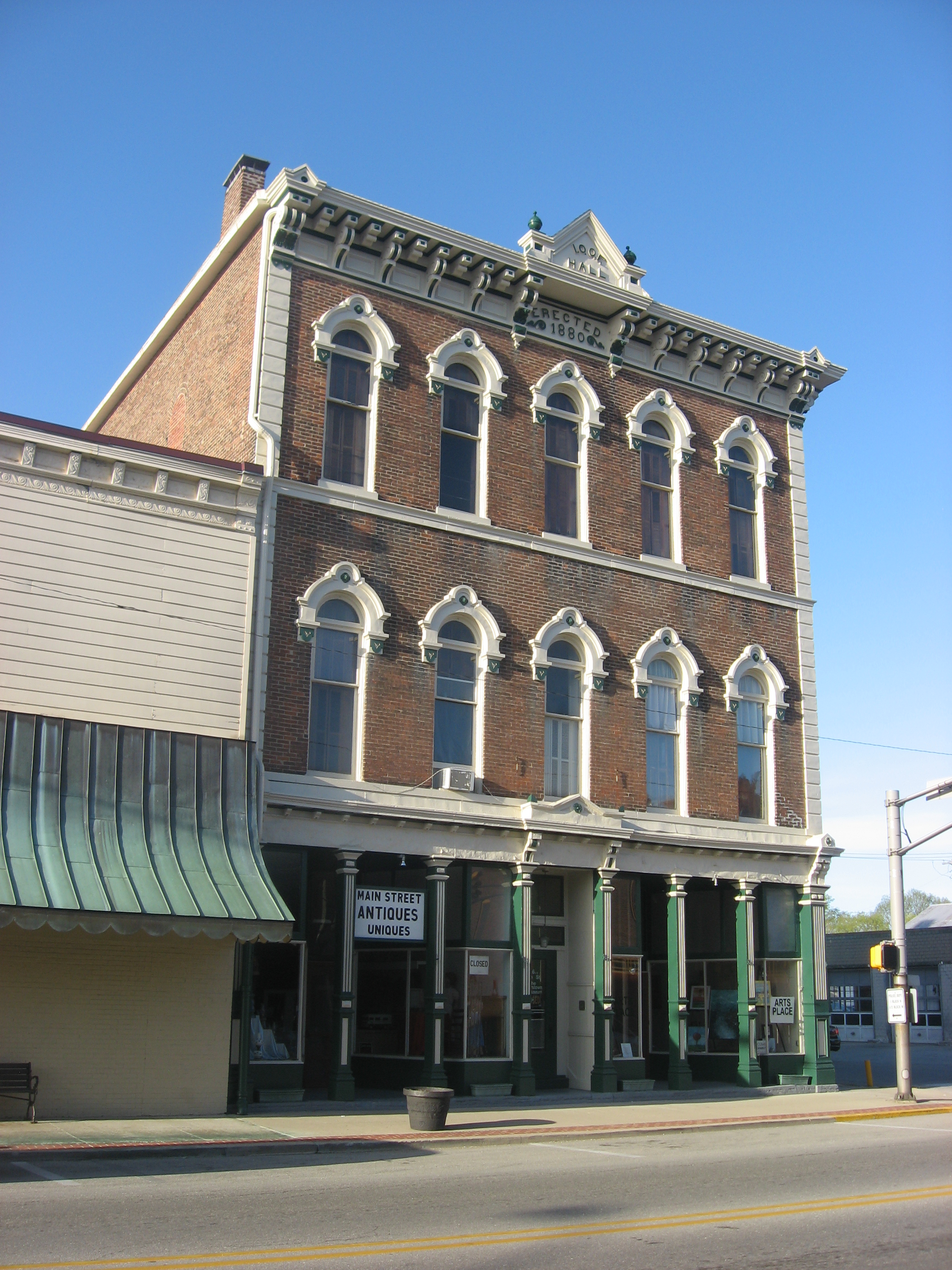
The Hagerstown IOOF Hall is listed on the National Register of Historic Places

Historical population
Census	Pop.	Note	%±
1850	606		—
1860	638		5.3%
1870	830		30.1%
1880	892		7.5%
1890	873		−2.1%
1900	862		−1.3%
1910	936		8.6%
1920	1,238		32.3%
1930	1,262		1.9%
1940	1,638		29.8%
1950	1,694		3.4%
1960	1,730		2.1%
1970	2,059		19.0%
1980	1,950		−5.3%
1990	1,835		−5.9%
2000	1,768		−3.7%
2010	1,787		1.1%
2020	1,681		−5.9%
U.S. Decennial Census

=== 2020 census ===
As of the 2020 census, Hagerstown had a population of 1,681. The median age was 41.4 years. 23.4% of residents were under the age of 18 and 19.9% of residents were 65 years of age or older. For every 100 females there were 89.1 males, and for every 100 females age 18 and over there were 85.4 males age 18 and over.

0.0% of residents lived in urban areas, while 100.0% lived in rural areas.

There were 735 households in Hagerstown, of which 31.6% had children under the age of 18 living in them. Of all households, 43.0% were married-couple households, 18.1% were households with a male householder and no spouse or partner present, and 31.6% were households with a female householder and no spouse or partner present. About 34.5% of all households were made up of individuals and 19.5% had someone living alone who was 65 years of age or older.

There were 800 housing units, of which 8.1% were vacant. The homeowner vacancy rate was 2.2% and the rental vacancy rate was 14.6%.

Racial composition as of the 2020 census
Race	Number	Percent
White	1,591	94.6%
Black or African American	9	0.5%
American Indian and Alaska Native	3	0.2%
Asian	14	0.8%
Native Hawaiian and Other Pacific Islander	0	0.0%
Some other race	3	0.2%
Two or more races	61	3.6%
Hispanic or Latino (of any race)	27	1.6%

=== 2010 census ===
As of the census of 2010, there were 1,787 people, 751 households, and 467 families living in the town. The population density was 1,333.6 inhabitants per square mile (514.9/km^{2}). There were 826 housing units at an average density of 616.4 per square mile (238.0/km^{2}). The racial makeup of the town was 97.7% White, 0.6% African American, 0.2% Native American, 0.3% Asian, and 1.2% from two or more races. Hispanic or Latino of any race were 0.8% of the population.

There were 751 households, of which 31.4% had children under the age of 18 living with them, 47.1% were married couples living together, 10.7% had a female householder with no husband present, 4.4% had a male householder with no wife present, and 37.8% were non-families. 33.0% of all households were made up of individuals, and 16.5% had someone living alone who was 65 years of age or older. The average household size was 2.38 and the average family size was 3.02.

The median age in the town was 37.9 years. 25.6% of residents were under the age of 18; 8.3% were between the ages of 18 and 24; 25.1% were from 25 to 44; 23.1% were from 45 to 64; and 17.9% were 65 years of age or older. The gender makeup of the town was 48.4% male and 51.6% female.

=== 2000 census ===
As of the census of 2000, there were 1,768 people, 787 households, and 498 families living in the town. The population density was 1,276.0 inhabitants per square mile (492.7/km^{2}). There were 832 housing units at an average density of 600.5 per square mile (231.9/km^{2}). The racial makeup of the town was 99.26% White, 0.28% African American, 0.06% Native American, 0.11% Asian, 0.06% from other races, and 0.23% from two or more races. Hispanic or Latino of any race were 0.34% of the population.

There were 787 households, out of which 28.8% had children under the age of 18 living with them, 52.5% were married couples living together, 8.4% had a female householder with no husband present, and 36.6% were non-families. 34.6% of all households were made up of individuals living alone, and 16.6% had someone living alone who was 65 years of age or older. The average household size was 2.25 and the average family size was 2.86.

The population has 24.0% under the age of 18, 7.0% from 18 to 24, 28.1% from 25 to 44, 23.9% from 45 to 64, and 17.1% who were 65 years of age or older. The median age was 39 years. For every 100 females, there were 85.5 males. For every 100 females age 18 and over, there were 82.1 males.

The median income for a household in the town was $36,691, and the median income for a family was $48,864. Males had a median income of $35,536 versus $25,913 for females. The per capita income for the town was $20,901. About 0.8% of families and 1.8% of the population were below the poverty line, including none of those under age 18 and 0.9% of those age 65 or over.

== Sites of interest ==
- Hartley Hills Golf Club and Event Center
- Abbott's Candy - candy factory
- Nettle Creek Valley Museum
- Hagerstown Park - Playground, hiking trails, sport fields, picnic areas
- Hagerstown Nature Preserve
- Near Hagerstown and Millville, Indiana is the Wilbur Wright birthplace and museum
- Tedco Toys, an education and science toy manufacturer. The company is notable for its gyroscopes and is the world's largest maker of the toy.
- The American Communications Network/Brian Bex Report (publishing and communications company) operates in Hagerstown.

== Education ==
Hagerstown Elementary and Hagerstown Jr./Sr. High School provide education for Hagerstown and smaller communities nearby. Hagerstown Jr./Sr. High School occupies a large campus which includes an outdoor laboratory and sporting facilities.

The town has a lending library, the Hagerstown-Jefferson Township Public Library.

== Notable people ==
- Charles H. Black, automobile pioneer
- Omer Madison Kem, American politician.
- Ralph Teetor, inventor of cruise control and president of the Perfect Circle Corporation.

== Media ==
=== Radio ===
WBST (91.1 FM): Repeater for National Public Radio affiliated station owned by Ball State University.

== Transportation ==
Hagerstown is situated on State Road 38, which passes through the town and intersects with State Road 1. Directly south of the town is Interstate 70, enabling travel and commuting to larger cities such as Indianapolis or Richmond.

By air, Hagerstown is served by the Hagerstown Airport. This is a public-use airport and utilizes a grass runway. The nearest commercial airport is Dayton International Airport in Dayton, Ohio.

The nearest rail link is the Amtrak station located in Connersville, Indiana.

== Municipal partnerships ==
- Hagerstown, Maryland, U.S. (since October 1, 2013)
