= John and Caroline Stonebraker House =

Historic house in Indiana, United States

- U.S. National Register of Historic Places
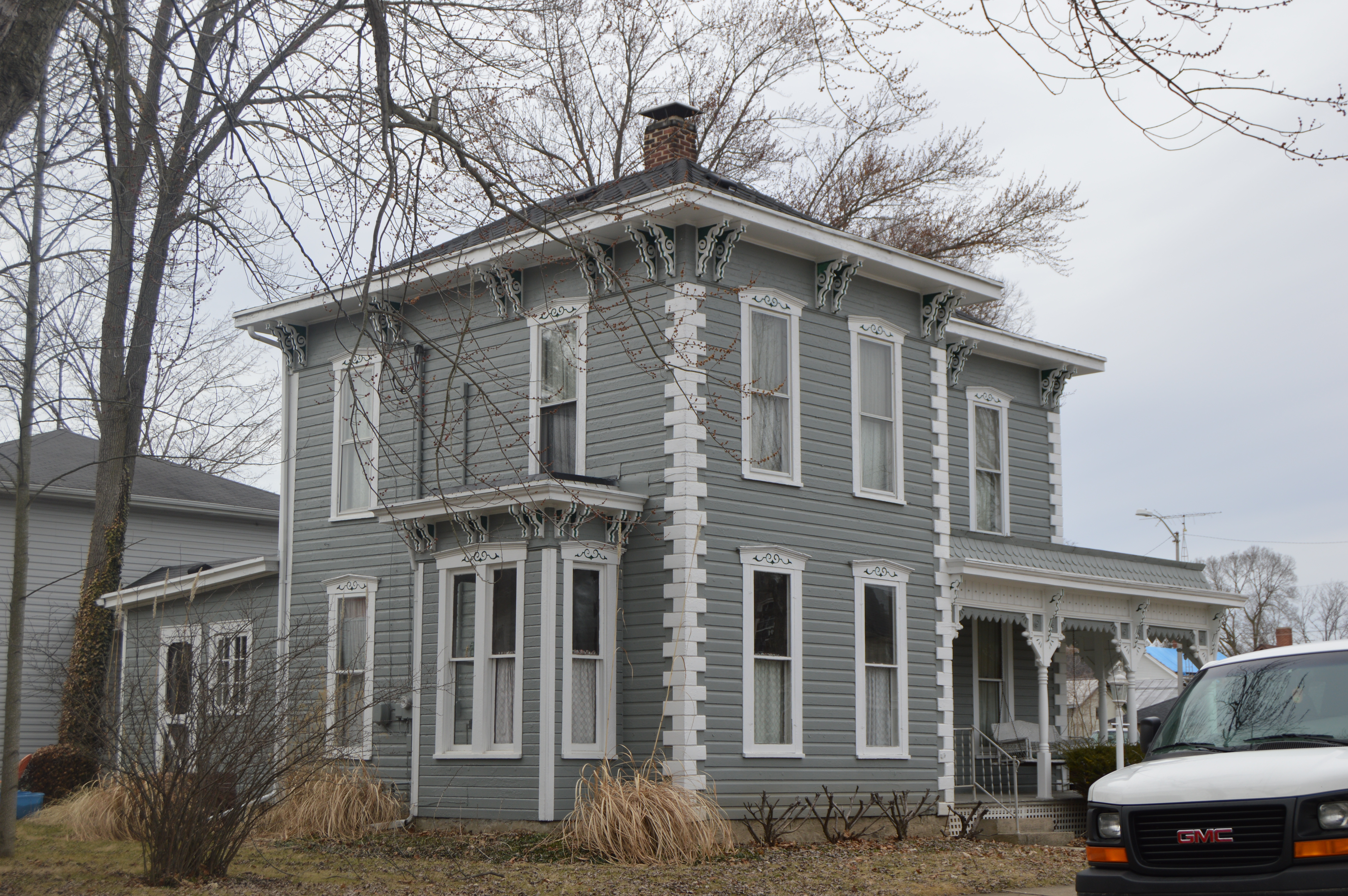
- John and Caroline Stonebraker House, March 2015

- Location within Indiana Location within the United States
- Location: 100 S. Washington St., Hagerstown, Indiana
- Coordinates: 39°54′35″N 85°9′45″W
- Area: less than one acre
- Built: c. 1875, c. 1890
- Architectural style: Italianate, Eastlake
- NRHP reference No.: 14001040
- Added to NRHP: December 16, 2014

John and Caroline Stonebraker House is a historic home located at Hagerstown, Indiana. It was built about 1875, and is a two-story, "L"-plan, Italianate style frame dwelling with a bracketed hipped roof. It is clad in Dutch-lap board with wooden quoins at each corner. It features a wraparound Eastlake movement style porch added about 1890.

It was added to the National Register of Historic Places in 2014.
