= Hagerstown Airport =

- IATA: none; ICAO: none; FAA LID: I61

Summary
- Airport type: Public
- Owner: Town of Hagerstown
- Location: Hagerstown, Indiana
- Elevation AMSL: 1,000 ft (300 m)
- Coordinates: 39°53′21″N 085°09′48″W
- Interactive map of Hagerstown Airport

Runways
Direction	Length		Surface
Direction	ft	m	Surface
2/20	4,000	1,219	Turf
- Source: Federal Aviation Administration

Hagerstown Airport (FAA LID: I61) is a public airport located one mile (1.6 km) south of the central business district of Hagerstown, a town in Wayne County, Indiana, United States. This airport is publicly owned by the Town of Hagerstown.

== Facilities ==
Hagerstown Airport covers an area of 80 acres (32 ha) which contains one runway:

- Runway 2/20: 4,000 x 200 ft (1,219 x 61 m), Surface: Turf

== See also ==
- List of airports in Indiana
